= 2021 Nippon Professional Baseball draft =

Japanese baseball draft event

2021 Nippon Professional Baseball Draft
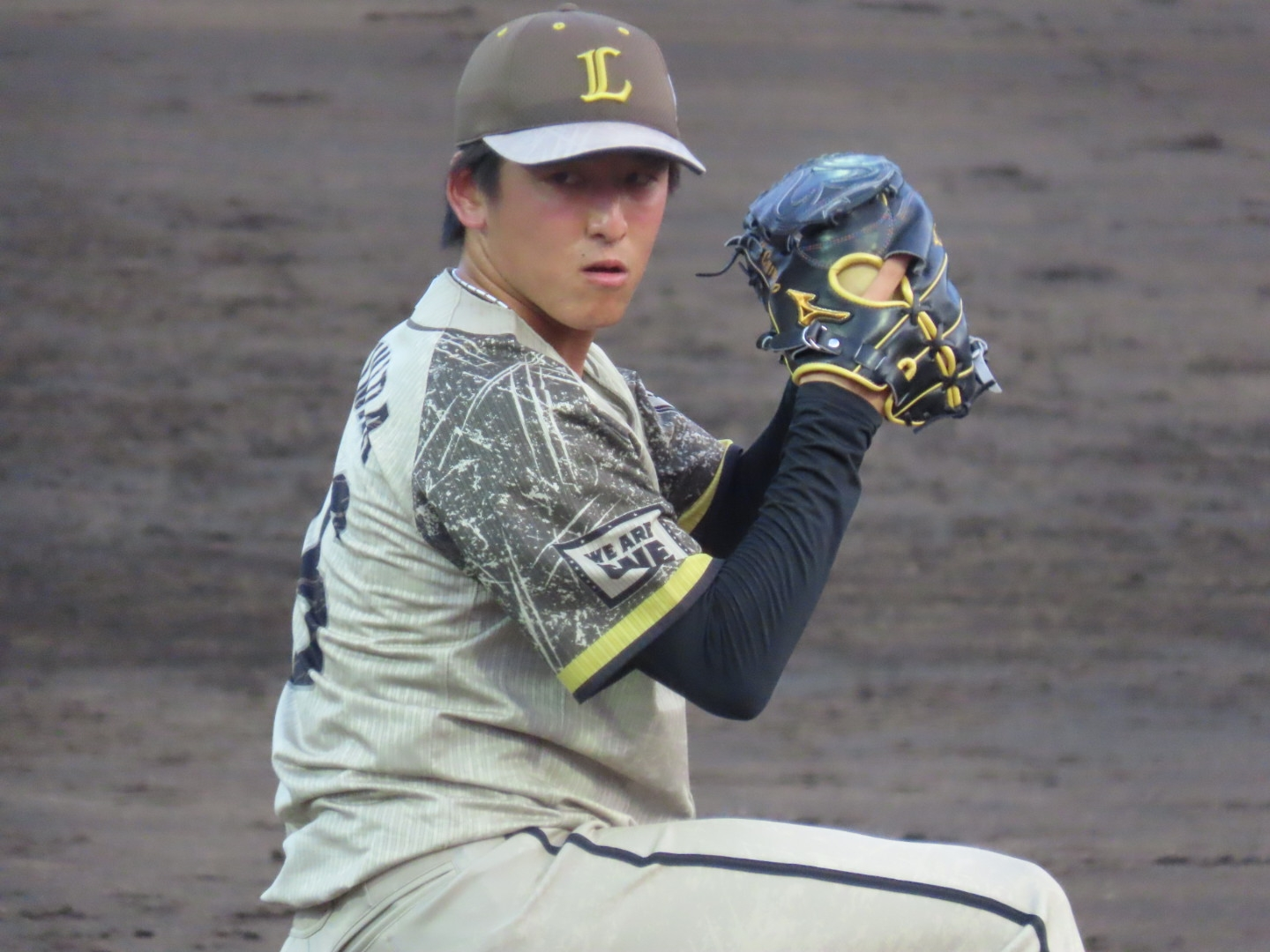
- Chihiro Sumida, who was nominated and a bid lottery for by four teams.

General information
- Sport: Baseball
- Date: October 11, 2021
- Location: Grand Prince Hotel Takanawa, Tokyo
- Networks: TBS (first round), sky-A
- Sponsored by: Taisho Pharmaceutical

Overview
- 128 total selections in 23 (Includes draft for developmental players) rounds
- League: Nippon Professional Baseball
- First round selections: Chihiro Sumida; Kenta Kozono

The 2021 Nippon Professional Baseball (NPB) Draft was held on October 11, 2021, for the 57th time at the Grand Prince Hotel Takanawa to assign amateur baseball players to the NPB. It was arranged with the special cooperation of Taisho Pharmaceutical with official naming rights. The draft was officially called "The Professional Baseball Draft Meeting supported by Lipovitan D ". It has been sponsored by Taisho Pharmaceutical for the 9th consecutive year since 2013.

== Summary ==
Only the first round picks will be done by bid lottery. from 2019, the Professional Baseball Executive Committee has decided that the Central League and the Pacific League will be given the second round of waiver priority alternately every other year, and in 2021 Central League received the waiver priority. And since it was held in the middle of the regular season, the second round of Waiver priority was decided according to the ranking as of October 10, the day before. From the third round the order was reversed continuing in the same fashion until all picks were exhausted. It ends when all teams are "selected" or when the total number of selected players reaches 120. Also, if the number of players has not reached 120, we will continue to hold a "developmental squad player selection meeting" with the participation of the desired team.

== First Round Contested Picks ==
	Player name	Position	Teams selected by
First Round	**Chihiro Sumida**	Pitcher	**Lions**, Carp, Giants, Swallows
First Round	**Kenta Kozono**	Pitcher	**Baystars**, Tigers
Second Round	**Hikaru Yamashita**	Pitcher	Carp, **Swallows**

- **Bolded** teams indicate who won the right to negotiate contract following a lottery.
- In the first round, **Kota Tatsu** (Pitcher) was selected by the **Fighters**, **Kenta Bright** (Outfielder) by the **Dragons**, **Kyuta Kazama** (Pitcher) by the **Hawks**, **Soshi Yoshino** (Outfielder) by the **Eagles**, **Kou Matsukawa** (Catcher) by the **Marines**, and **Ren Mukunoki** (Pitcher) by the **Buffaloes** without a bid lottery.
- In the second round, **Taisei Ota** (Pitcher) was selected by the **Giants**, and **Daichi Moriki** (Pitcher) by the **Tigers** without a bid lottery.
- In the thrird round, the last remaining the **Carp**, selected **Takumi Kurohara** (Pitcher)
- List of selected players.

== Selected Players ==
Key
*	Player did not sign

- The order of the teams is the order of second round waiver priority.
- **Bolded** After that, a developmental player who contracted as a registered player under control.
- List of selected players.

=== Yokohama DeNA Baystars ===
Pick	Player name	Position	Team
#1	Kenta Kozono	Pitcher	Wakayama High School
#2	Sōma Tokuyama	Pitcher	Waseda University
#3	Ryūnosuke Aibara	Infielder	Tokyo Gattkan High School
#4	Ginji Miura	Pitcher	Hosei University
#5	Ōsuke Fukazawa	Pitcher	Senshu University Matsudo High School
#6	Kōki Kajiwara	Outfielder	Kanagawa University
Developmental Player Draft
#1	Nagi Murakawa	Outfielder	Tokushima Indigo Socks
#2	Naoya Higashide	Catcher	Komatsu Ohtani High School
#3	Takeru Ohashi	Outfielder	Ibaraki Astro Planets

=== Hokkaido Nippon-Ham Fighters ===
Pick	Player name	Position	Team
#1	Kota Tatsu	Pitcher	Tenri High School
#2	Naoki Arizono	Infielder	Chiba Gakugei High School
#3	Tatsuki Mizuno	Infielder	JR Shikoku
#4	Uta Sakaguchi	Infielder	Gifu Daiichi High School
#5	Kyosuke Kuroyanagi	Pitcher	Chukyo University Chukyo High School
#6	Takehiro Hasegawa	Pitcher	Kanazawa Gakuin University
#7	Keito Matsuura	Pitcher	Osaka Tōin High School
#8	Koki Kitayama	Pitcher	Kyoto Sangyo University
#9	Daigo Kamikawabata	Infielder	NTT East
Developmental Player Draft
#1	Ren Fukushima	Pitcher	Hachinohe Nishi High School
#2	Takanari Hayamizu	Catcher	Gunma Diamond Pegasus
#3	Taisei Yanagawa	Pitcher	Kyushu International University High School
#4	Kazuhiro Abe	Outfielder	Hiratsuka Gakuen High School

=== Chunichi Dragons ===
Pick	Player name	Position	Team
#1	Kenta Bright	Outfielder	Jobu University
#2	Kosuke Ukai	Outfielder	Komazawa University
#3	Taisei Ishimori	Pitcher	Hinokuni Salamanders
#4	Taisei Miya	Catcher	Hanasaki Tokuharu High School
#5	Mao Hoshino	Infielder	Toyohashi Chuo High School
#6	Yuma Fukumoto	Outfielder	Osaka University of Commerce

=== Saitama Seibu Lions ===
Pick	Player name	Position	Team
#1	Chihiro Sumida	Pitcher	Nishinippon Institute of Technology
#2	Shunsuke Sato	Pitcher	University of Tsukuba
#3	Yūto Koga	Catcher	Chuo University
#4	Shinnosuke Hada	Pitcher	Hachiouji High School
#5	Masaya Kuroda	Pitcher	Hachinohe Institute of Technology Daiichi High School
#6	Seigo Nakayama	Infielder	Hakuoh University
Developmental Player Draft
#1	Takeru Furuichi	Catcher	Tokushima Indigo Socks
#2	**Natsuo Takizawa**	Infielder	Sekine Gakuen High School
#3	Shinya Sugai	Pitcher	Yamamoto Gakuen High School
#4	Keishin Kawamura	Outfielder	Kokugakuin University

=== Hiroshima Toyo Carp ===
Pick	Player name	Position	Team
#1	Takumi Kurohara	Pitcher	Kwansei Gakuin University
#2	Shohei Mori	Pitcher	Mitsubishi Heavy Industries West
#3	Kento Nakamura	Outfielder	Toyota
#4	Shunsuke Tamura	Outfielder	Aichi Institute of Technology Meiden High School
#5	Ryuya Matsumoto	Pitcher	Honda Suzuka
#6	Shota Suekane	Outfielder	Osaka Gas
#7	Shoto Takagi	Catcher	Gifu Commercial High School
Developmental Player Draft
#1	Soh Shinya	Pitcher	Tanabe High School
#2	Seita Maekawa	Infielder	Tsuruga Kehi High School
#3	Raisei Nakamura	Pitcher	Takaoka Daiichi High School
#4	Rei Sakata	Pitcher	Chubu Gakuin University

=== Fukuoka SoftBank Hawks ===
Pick	Player name	Position	Team
#1	Kyuta Kazama	Pitcher	North Asia University Meiou High School
#2	Tomoya Masaki	Outfielder	Keio University
#3	Taisei Kimura	Pitcher	Hokkai High School
#4	Isami Nomura	Infielder	NTT West
#5	Fuga Ohtake	Pitcher	Tohoku Fukushi University
Developmental Player Draft
#1	Keio Fujino	Infielder	Tobata High School
#2	**Yuto Kawamura**	Outfielder	Sendai University
#3	Sanshiro Izaki	Pitcher	Fukuoka High School
#4	**Mizuki Miura**	Pitcher	Tohoku Fukushi University
#5	Leiri Hammond Tanaka	Pitcher	Teikyo Daigo High School
#6	Koki Katoh	Pitcher	Takigawa Daini High School
#7	Takuma Yamasaki	Pitcher	Iwami Chisuikan High School
#8	Takuto Sakuma	Catcher	Tamura High School
#9	**Keita Yamamoto**	Outfielder	Meisei University
#10	Sora Katoh	Catcher	Tomeikan High School
#11	Masaki Takimoto	Pitcher	Municipal Matsudo High School
#12	Yoshiki Mishiro	Infielder	Oita Commercial High School
#13	Takuma Sato	Pitcher	Niigata University of Health and Welfare
#14	**Keisuke Nakata**	Outfielder	Fukuoka University

=== Yomiuri Giants ===
Pick	Player name	Position	Team
#1	Taisei Ota	Pitcher	Kansai University of International Studies
#2	Ryūsei Yamada	Pitcher	JR East
#3	Yuji Akahoshi	Pitcher	Nihon University
#4	Hayato Ishita	Pitcher	Tokai University Sagami High School
#5	Yūki Okada	Outfielder	Hosei University
#6	Yamato Shiroki	Pitcher	Meitoku Gijuku High School
#7	Yūki Hanada	Pitcher	Hiroshima Shinjo High School
Developmental Player Draft
#1	Yamato Suzuki	Outfielder	Hokkai Gakuen University
#2	Ryūsei Takata	Pitcher	Ishikawa Million Stars
#3	Keita Kameda	Catcher	Tokai University
#4	Misaki Sasahara	Outfielder	Ueda Nishi High School
#5	Eiji Kamouchi	Pitcher	Soseikan High School
#6	**Taiki Kikuchi**	Pitcher	Toin University of Yokohama
#7	Makoto Kyōmoto	Pitcher	Meiho High School
#8	Ryū Tomida	Pitcher	Shikoku Gakuin University
#9	Haruto Kawasaki	Pitcher	Homare High School
#10	Ryōya Ōtsu	Catcher	Hokkai High School

=== Tohoku Rakuten Golden Eagles ===
Pick	Player name	Position	Team
#1	Soshi Yoshino	Outfielder	Shohei High School
#2	Yuma Yasuda	Catcher	Aichi University
#3	Ginji Maeda	Outfielder	Mishima Minami High School
#4	Katsutoshi Tai	Pitcher	Kamimura Gakuen High School
#5	Tomotaka Matsui	Pitcher	Kanazawa Gakuin University
#6	Masaya Nishigaki	Pitcher	Waseda University
#7	Kazuki Yoshikawa	Pitcher	JFE West Japan
Developmental Player Draft
#1	**Satoshi Miyamori**	Pitcher	Kochi Fighting Dogs
#2	Ozora Yanagisawa	Outfielder	Nihon University Fujisawa High School
#3	Sho Okawara	Outfielder	Tokai University Yamagata High School

=== Hanshin Tigers ===
Pick	Player name	Position	Team
#1	Daichi Moriki	Pitcher	Kochi High School
#2	Yuto Suzuki	Pitcher	Soka University
#3	Takuma Kirishiki	Pitcher	Niigata University of Health and Welfare
#4	Ukyo Maegawa	Outfielder	Chiben Gakuen High School
#5	Hidetaka Okadome	Pitcher	Asia University
#6	Hiroshi Toyoda	Outfielder	Hitachi
#7	Hayato Nakagawa	Catcher	Kyoto International High School
Developmental Player Draft
#1	Ryo Itoh	Pitcher	Chukyo University

=== Chiba Lotte Marines ===
Pick	Player name	Position	Team
#1	Kou Matsukawa	Catcher	Wakayama High School
#2	Raito Ikeda	Infielder	Kokushikan University
#3	Atsuya Hirohata	Pitcher	Mitsubishi Motors Kurashiki Oceans
#4	Seiun Akiyama	Pitcher	Nishogakusha University High School
#5	Akira Yagi	Pitcher	Mitsubishi Heavy Industries West
Developmental Player Draft
#1	Fuki Tanaka	Pitcher	Asahikawa Jitsugyo High School
#2	Shota Hayamizu	Infielder	Toyama GRN Thunderbirds
#3	Kirato Nagashimada	Pitcher	Tachibana Gakuen High School
#4	Ryosuke Murayama	Catcher	Makuhari Sougou High School

=== Tokyo Yakult Swallows ===
Pick	Player name	Position	Team
#1	Hikaru Yamashita	Pitcher	Hosei University
#2	Kazuya Maruyama	Outfielder	Meiji University
#3	Daichi Shibata	Pitcher	Nippon Express
#4	Kōtarō Komori	Infielder	Ube Technical High School
#5	Hyuga Takeyama	Pitcher	Kyoei High School
Developmental Player Draft
#1	Yukihiro Iwata	Outfielder	Shinano Grandserows

=== Orix Buffaloes ===
Pick	Player name	Position	Team
#1	Ren Mukunoki	Pitcher	Tohoku Fukushi University
#2	Tomoya Noguchi	Infielder	Kansai University
#3	Sho Fukunaga	Catcher	Kokugakuin University
#4	Haruto Watanabe	Outfielder	Keio University
#5	Ryoma Ikeda	Outfielder	Osaka Toin High School
#6	Kaede Yokoyama	Pitcher	Sega Sammy
#7	Atsuya Kogita	Pitcher	TDK
Developmental Player Draft
#1	Takayuki Yamanaka	Outfielder	Ibaraki Astro Planets
#2	Keita Sonobe	Infielder	Fukushima RedHopes
#3	Kosei Ohsato	Infielder	Tohoku Fukushi University

Preceded by **2020**	**Nippon Professional Baseball draft**	Succeeded by **2022**
