= Atsuya =

- Gender: Male

Origin
- Origin: Japanese
- Meaning: Different meanings depending on the kanji used

Atsuya (written: 敦也, 淳矢, 温允, 篤矢, or 渥哉) is a masculine Japanese given name. Notable people with the name include:

- Atsuya Furuta (古田 敦也; born 1965), Japanese baseball player and manager
- Atsuya Hirohata (廣畑 敦也; born 1997), Japanese baseball player
- Atsuya Horie (塹江 敦哉; born 1997), Japanese baseball player
- Atsuya Kogita (小木田 敦也; born 1998), Japanese baseball player
- Atsuya Okuda (奥田 敦也), Japanese musician
- Atsuya Ota (太田 敦也; born 1984), Japanese basketball player
- Atsuya Yaguchi (矢口 敦也; born 1976), Japanese sledge hockey player
