= Raito Ikeda =

Japanese baseball player (born 1999)

Chiba Lotte Marines – No. 00
- Infielder
- Born: December 11, 1999 (age 26); Yachiyo, Chiba, Japan
- Bats: Right Throws: Right

NPB debut
- March 31, 2022, for the Chiba Lotte Marines

NPB statistics (through 2025 season)
- Batting average: .224
- Home runs: 7
- Runs batted in: 29

Teams
- Chiba Lotte Marines (2022–present)

Raito Ikeda (池田 来翔, Ikeda Raito; born December 11, 1999) is a Japanese professional baseball infielder for the Chiba Lotte Marines of Nippon Professional Baseball (NPB). He was selected in the second round of the 2021 NPB draft from Kokushikan University.

== Early career ==
Ikeda played for the Chiba Lotte Marines Junior Team as a 6th year elementary student. He later played third base on the Narashino High School baseball team with current Lotte teammate Takuro Furuya, but his team could not advance to the Summer Koshien tournament, losing in the Chiba Prefecture final to Kisarazu Sogo High School. After graduation from Narashino High School, Ikeda entered Kokushikan University where he was a regular at third base and second base from his first year. His teammate at Kokushikan University was Akito Takabe, Lotte 3rd round draft pick in the 2021 NPB draft.

On November 18, 2021, Ikeda signed with Chiba Lotte for 12 million yen per year plus a 70 million yen signing bonus. Ikeda is the first alumni of the Chiba Lotte Junior Team to sign a professional contract.
