= Yūto Koga =

Japanese baseball player (born 1999)

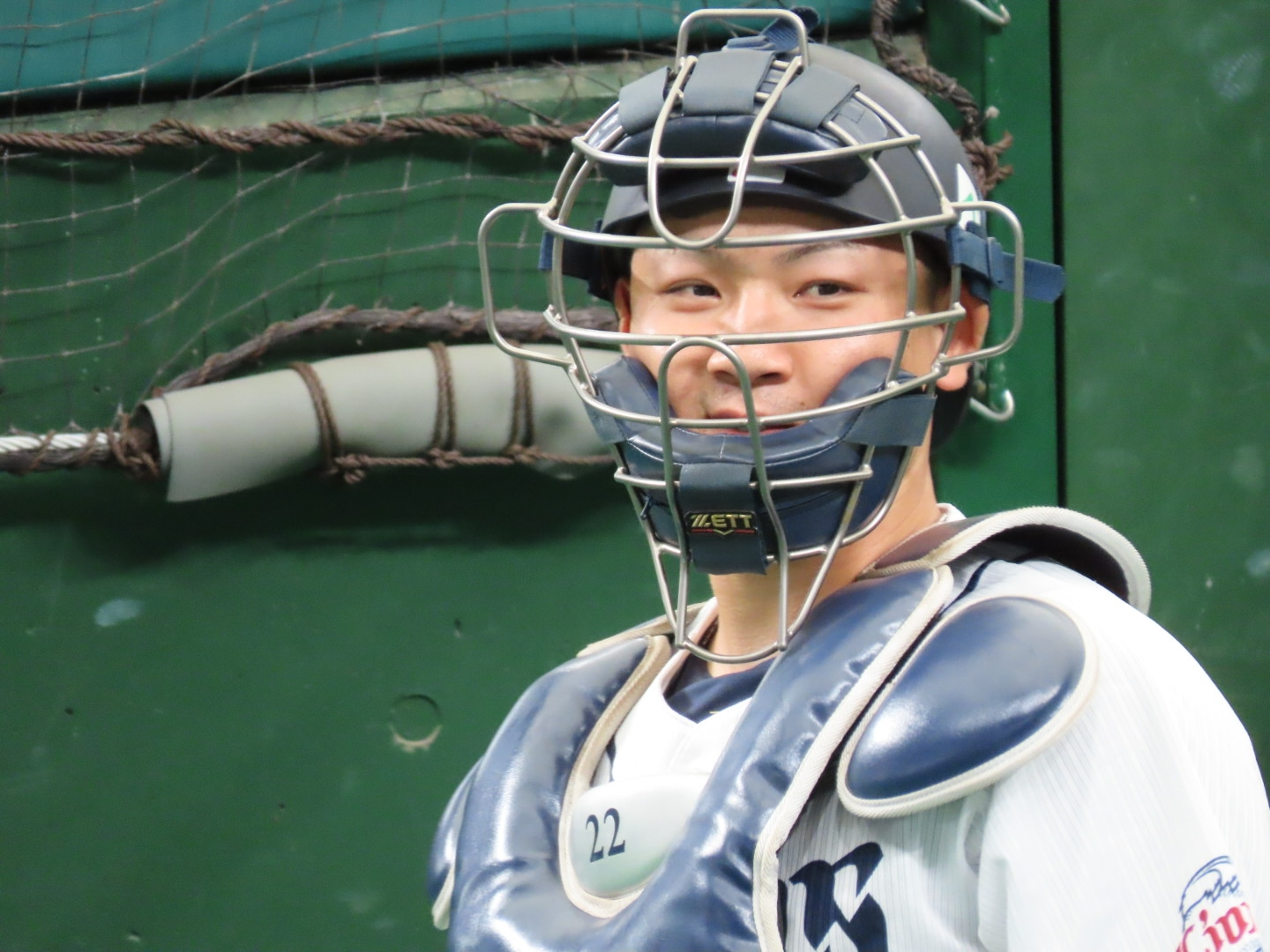

Saitama Seibu Lions – No. 22
- Catcher
- Born: 10 September 1999 (age 26); Chikushino, Fukuoka, Japan
- Bats: Right Throws: Right

NPB debut
- 5 May, 2022, for the Saitama Seibu Lions

NPB statistics (through 2024)
- Batting average: .215
- Hits: 117
- Home Runs: 6
- RBI: 36

Teams
- Saitama Seibu Lions (2022–present)
Medals
Men's baseball
Representing Japan
Asia Professional Baseball Championship
Gold medal – first place	2023 Tokyo	Team
WBSC Premier12
Silver medal – second place	2024	Team
U-18 Baseball World Cup
Bronze medal – third place	2017 Thunder Bay	Team

Yūto Koga (古賀 悠斗, Koga Yūto; born 10 September 1999) is a Japanese professional baseball catcher for the Saitama Seibu Lions of Nippon Professional Baseball (NPB).

== Career ==
Koga studied at the Faculty of Law of the Chuo University, where he also played baseball, becoming the team's starting catcher in his second year and the club's captain in his fourth year. He was selected by the Saitama Seibu Lions in the 2021 Nippon Professional Baseball draft.

He made his debut with the team on 5 May 2022 against the Hokkaido Nippon-Ham Fighters at the Belluna Dome. On 7 May, he recorded his first hit against the Hiroshima Toyo Carp. He scored his first RBI on 11 May against the Carp. He hit his first home run on 20 July against the Chiba Lotte Marines at the Zozo Marine Stadium. In 26 games during the season, Koga recorded a .155 batting average, nine hits, one home run and four RBI.

In 2023, he finished the season with a .218 batting average, 52 hits, two home runs and 20 RBI in 100 games. In 2024, he played 105 games, recording a .228 batting average, 56 hits, three home runs and 12 RBI.

== International career ==
Koga represented Japan in the 2017 U-18 Baseball World Cup, held in Thunder Bay, Canada, where the Japanese squad won the bronze medal. He was also part of the Japanese team that won the 2023 Asia Professional Baseball Championship. Koga was selected to represent Japan in the 2024 WBSC Premier12.
