= Takehiro Hasegawa =

Japanese baseball player (born 1999)

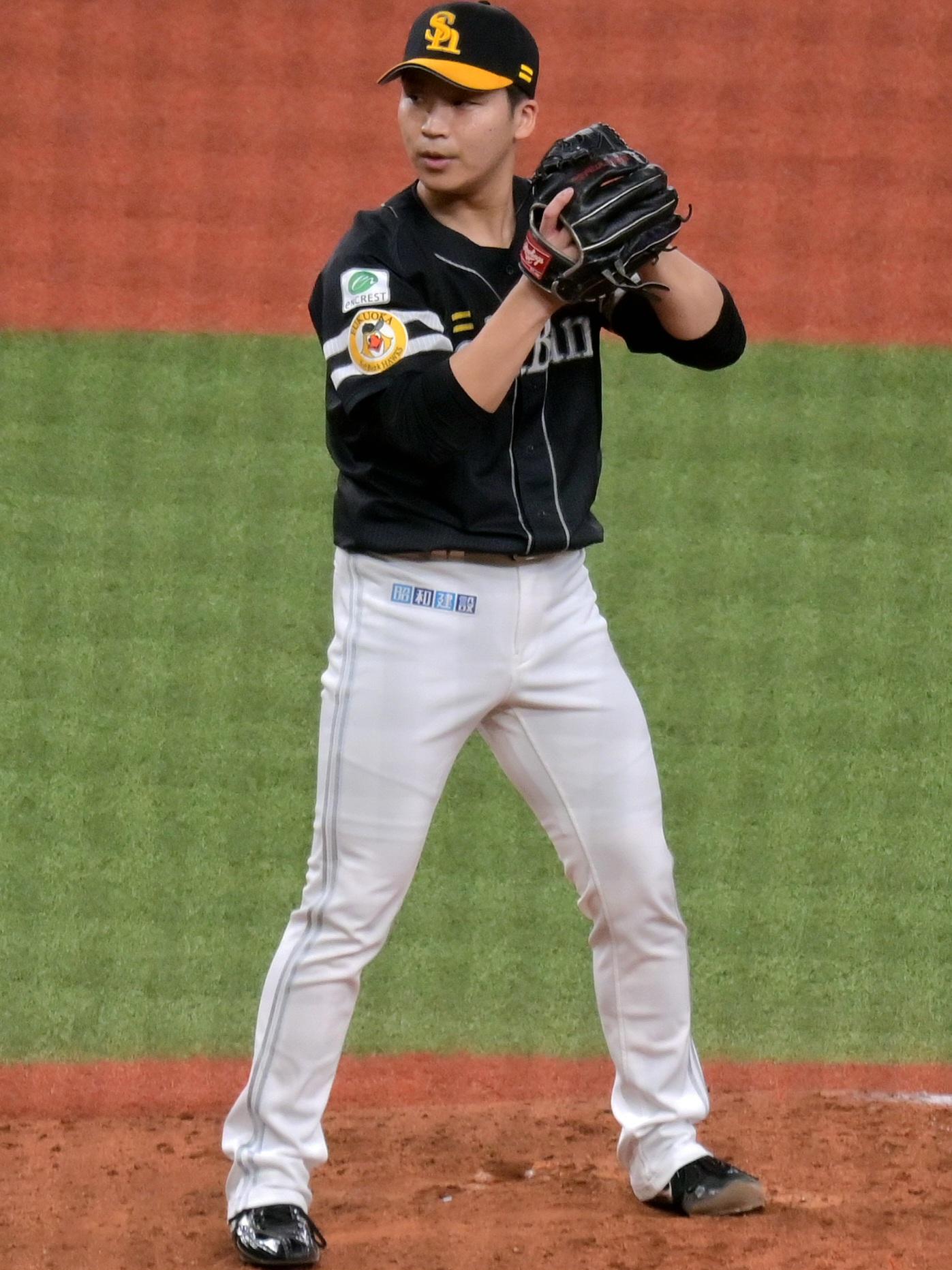
- Hasegawa with the Fukuoka SoftBank Hawks

Fukuoka SoftBank Hawks – No. 59
- Pitcher
- Born: August 9, 1999 (age 26); Ōmiya-ku, Saitama, Saitama, Japan
- Bats: Left Throws: Left

NPB debut
- March 26, 2023, for the Hokkaido Nippon-Ham Fighters

NPB statistics (through 2024 season)
- Win–loss record: 4-0
- ERA: 2.02
- Strikeouts: 28

Teams
- Hokkaido Nippon-Ham Fighters (2022–2023); Fukuoka SoftBank Hawks (2024–present)

Career highlights and awards
- Japan Series champion (2025)

Takehiro Hasegawa (長谷川 威展, Hasegawa Takehiro; born August 9, 1999) is a Japanese professional baseball pitcher for the Fukuoka SoftBank Hawks of Nippon Professional Baseball (NPB). He has previously played in NPB for the Hokkaido Nippon-Ham Fighters.

== Professional career ==
=== Hokkaido Nippon-Ham Fighters ===
On October 11, 2021, Hasegawa was drafted 6th round pick by the Hokkaido Nippon-Ham Fighters in the 2021 Nippon Professional Baseball draft.

On March 26, 2022, Hasegawa pitched his debut game in the Pacific League against the Fukuoka SoftBank Hawks. On October 2, against the Saitama Seibu Lions, he recorded a hold for the first time. He pitched two games in his rookie year.

Hasegawa pitched in 9 games for the Fighters in 2023, recording a 1.08 ERA with 5 strikeouts across 8 1/3 innings pitched.

=== Fukuoka SoftBank Hawks ===
On December 8, 2023, NPB held its second time active player draft, and Hasegawa was selected by the Fukuoka SoftBank Hawks and transferred. He made 32 appearances for Fukuoka in 2024, posting a 4-0 record and 2.49 ERA with 21 strikeouts across 25 1/3 innings pitched.

On March 21, 2025, it was announced that Hasegawa would miss the entirety of the season after undergoing Tommy John surgery.
