= Kenta Bright =

Japanese baseball player (born 1999)

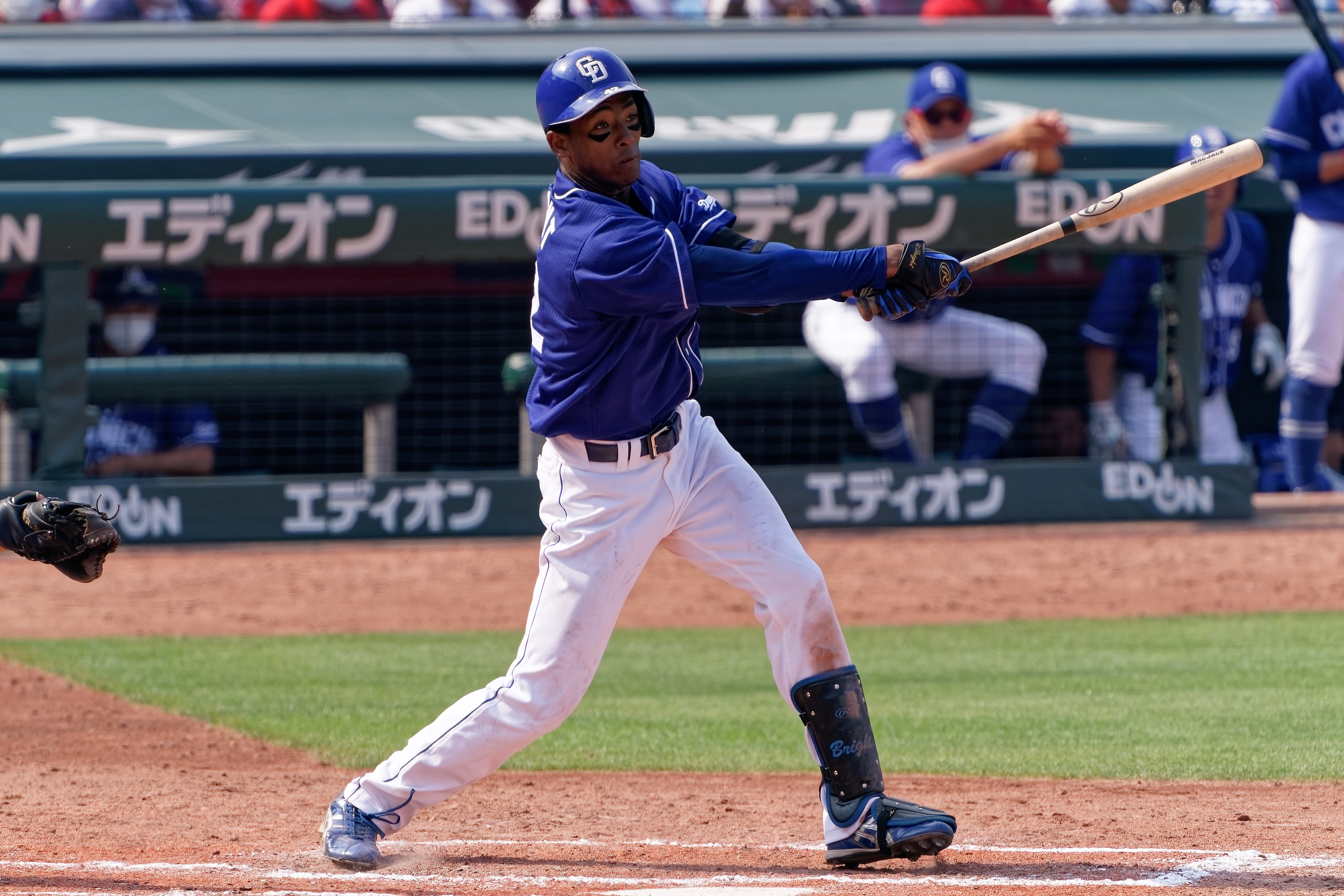
- Bright with the Chunichi Dragons in 2022
- Outfielder
- Born: May 7, 1999 (age 27); Adachi, Tokyo, Japan
- Batted: Right Threw: Right

NPB debut
- April 5, 2023, for the Chunichi Dragons

Last NPB appearance
- April 19, 2026, for the Chunichi Dragons

NPB statistics (through 2026 season)
- Batting average: .241
- Home runs: 5
- Runs batted in: 27

Teams
- Chunichi Dragons (2023–2026)

Kenta Adu Bright (ブライト健太, Bright Kenta Adu; May 7, 1999) is a former Japanese professional baseball outfielder.

== Early life ==
Bright was born in Adachi, Tokyo, Japan, on 7 May 1999 to a Ghanaian father and a Japanese mother. He practiced judo from first grade to sixth grade, which is when he switched to baseball.

== Amateur career ==
Bright attended Tokyo Metropolitan Katsushikano High School, playing as a first baseman on the baseball team. He hit a total of 38 home runs during his high school career.

After high school, Bright played college baseball at Jobu University, members of the Kankoshin Student Baseball Federation. He was a reserve player until his third year due to his struggles hitting curveballs, but had a breakout season in year four. Bright led his team to a league title, recording three home runs and 12 runs batted in (RBI) in the tournament and earning most valuable player honors. He then hit two home runs in the 2021 All Japan University Baseball Championship, though they were defeated by Keio University in the semifinals.

He submitted his name to the Nippon Professional Baseball (NPB) draft on September 24, 2021.

== Professional career ==
On October 11, 2021, Bright was selected by the Chunichi Dragons in the first round of the 2021 NPB draft. He signed his first professional contract on December 7, agreeing to an annual salary of ¥16 million (US$101,063.7) and a signing bonus of ¥100 million (US$631,648.1). Bright chose the 42 jersey number in honor of Jackie Robinson.

As a rookie in 2022, Bright suffered wrist and shoulder injuries that prevented him from playing with the first squad. Instead, he recorded three home runs and 10 RBI in 46 Western League games played with the second squad.

On September 30, 2026, the Dragons announced they had released Bright. Weeks later on October 15, Bright announced his retirement, revealing he had been suffering from depression since April.
