= Natsuo Takizawa =

Japanese baseball player (born 2003)

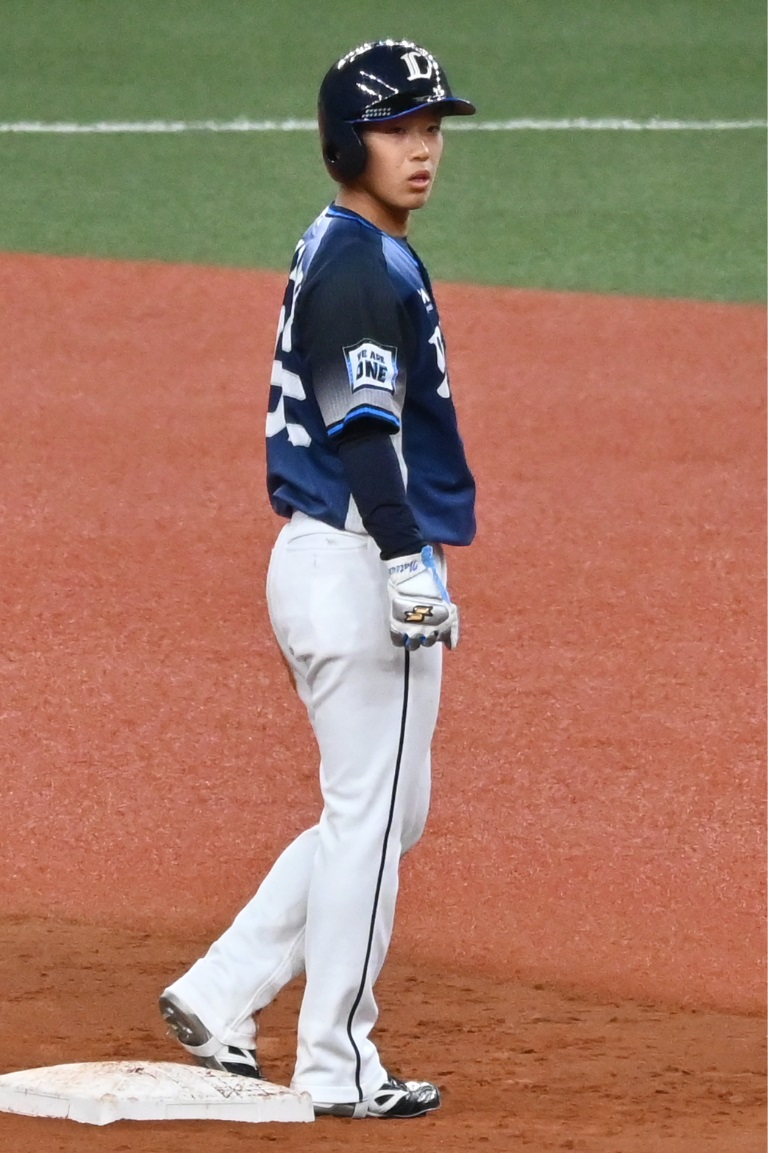

Saitama Seibu Lions – No. 62
- Infielder
- Born: August 13, 2003 (age 23); Jōetsu, Niigata, Japan
- Bats: Left Throws: Right

NPB debut
- May 13, 2022, for the Saitama Seibu Lions

NPB statistics (through 2025 season)
- Batting average: .222
- Home runs: 1
- Runs batted in: 23
- Stolen bases: 25
- Stats at Baseball Reference

Teams
- Saitama Seibu Lions (2022–present)

Career highlights and awards
- 2x NPB All-Star (2025, 2026)

Natsuo Takizawa (滝澤 夏央, Takizawa Natsuo; born August 13, 2003) is a Japanese professional baseball infielder for the Saitama Seibu Lions of Nippon Professional Baseball (NPB).
