= Yūki Okada =

Japanese baseball player (born 2000)

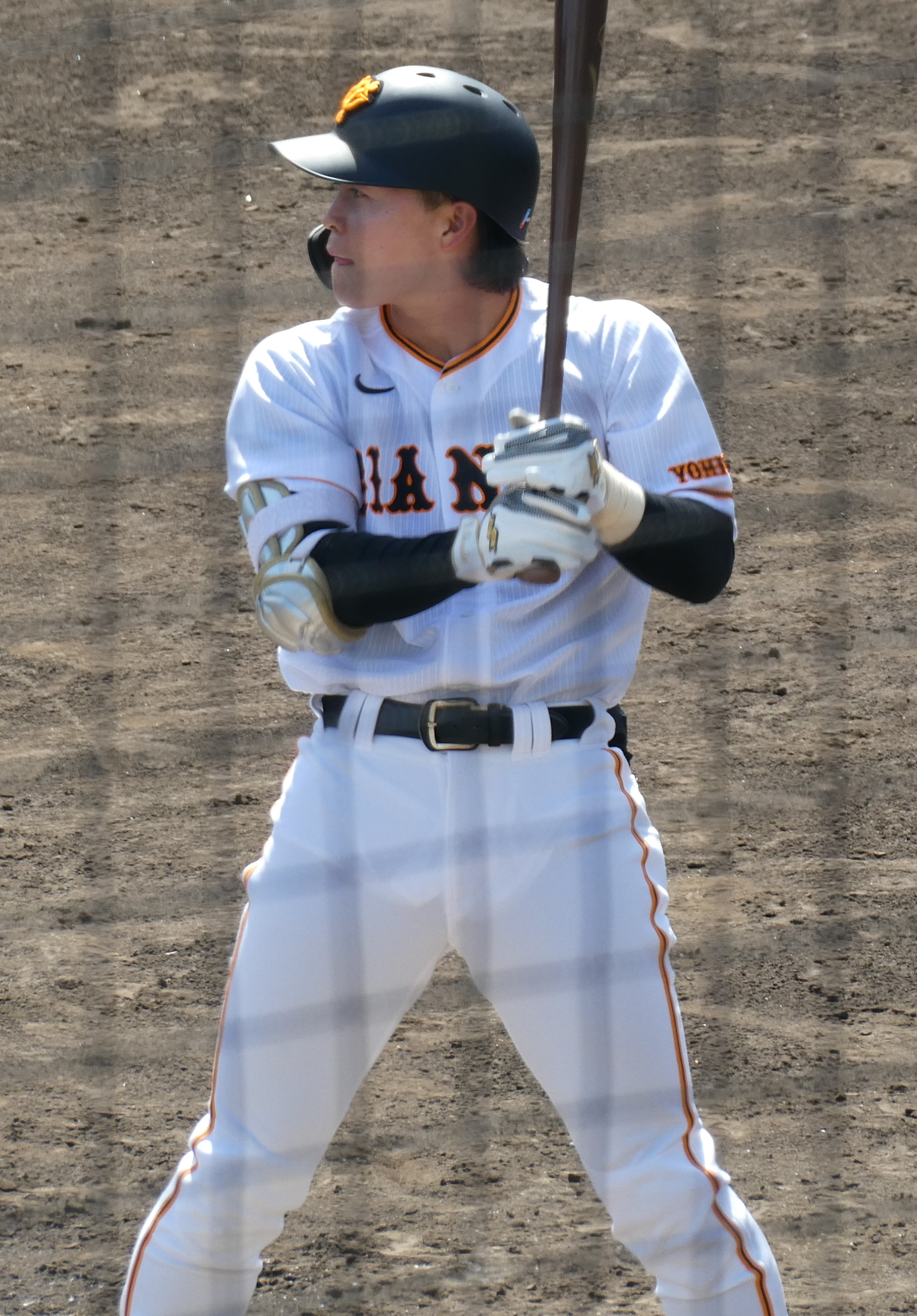

Yomiuri Giants – No. 38
- Outfielder
- Born: January 19, 2000 (age 26); Higashihiroshima, Hiroshima, Japan
- Bats: Left Throws: Right

NPB debut
- May 8, 2022, for the Yomiuri Giants

NPB statistics (through 2023 season)
- Batting average: .145
- Home runs: 1
- RBI: 2
- Hits: 10
- Stolen base: 0
- Sacrifice bunt: 1
- Stats at Baseball Reference

Teams
- Yomiuri Giants (2022–present)

Yūki Okada (岡田 悠希, Okada Yūki; born January 19, 2000) is a professional Japanese baseball player. He plays outfielder for the Yomiuri Giants.
