= Takuma Kirishiki =

Japanese baseball player (born 1999)

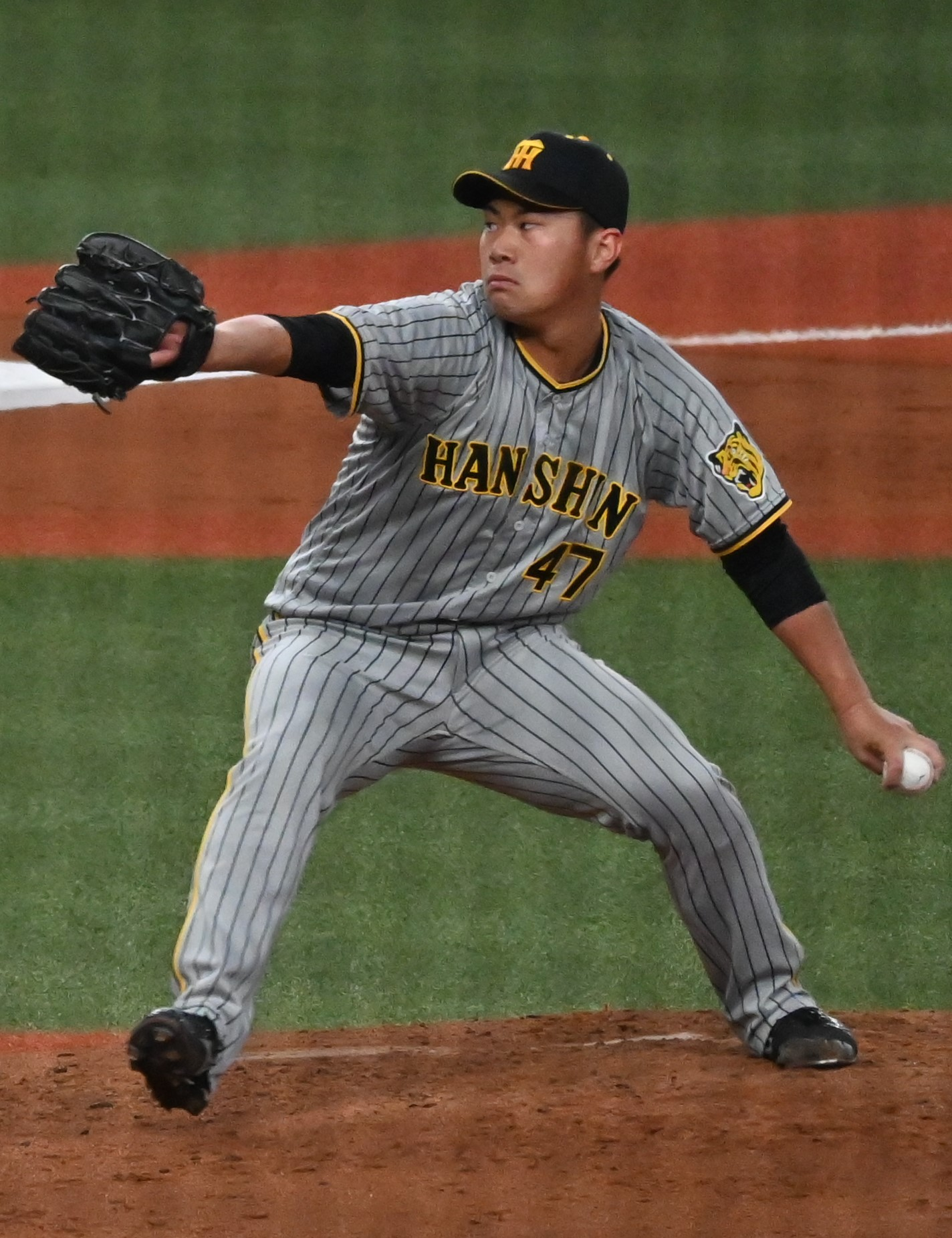

Hanshin Tigers – No. 47
- Pitcher
- Born: June 20, 1999 (age 27); Kōnosu, Saitama, Japan
- Bats: Left Throws: Left

NPB debut
- March 27, 2022, for the Hanshin Tigers

Career statistics (through 2025 season)
- Win–loss record: 7–5
- Earned run average: 2.34
- Strikeouts: 151
- Saves: 1
- Holds: 67
- Stats at Baseball Reference

Teams
- Hanshin Tigers (2022–present)

Career highlights and awards
- 1× Central League Most Valuable Setup pitcher (2024); 1× Japan Series Champion (2023); NPB All-Star (2024)

Takuma Kirishiki (桐敷 拓馬, Kirishiki Takuma; born June 20, 1999 in Kōnosu, Saitama, Japan) is a Japanese professional baseball pitcher for the Hanshin Tigers of Nippon Professional Baseball (NPB).
