= Kōtarō Komori =

Japanese baseball player (born 2003)

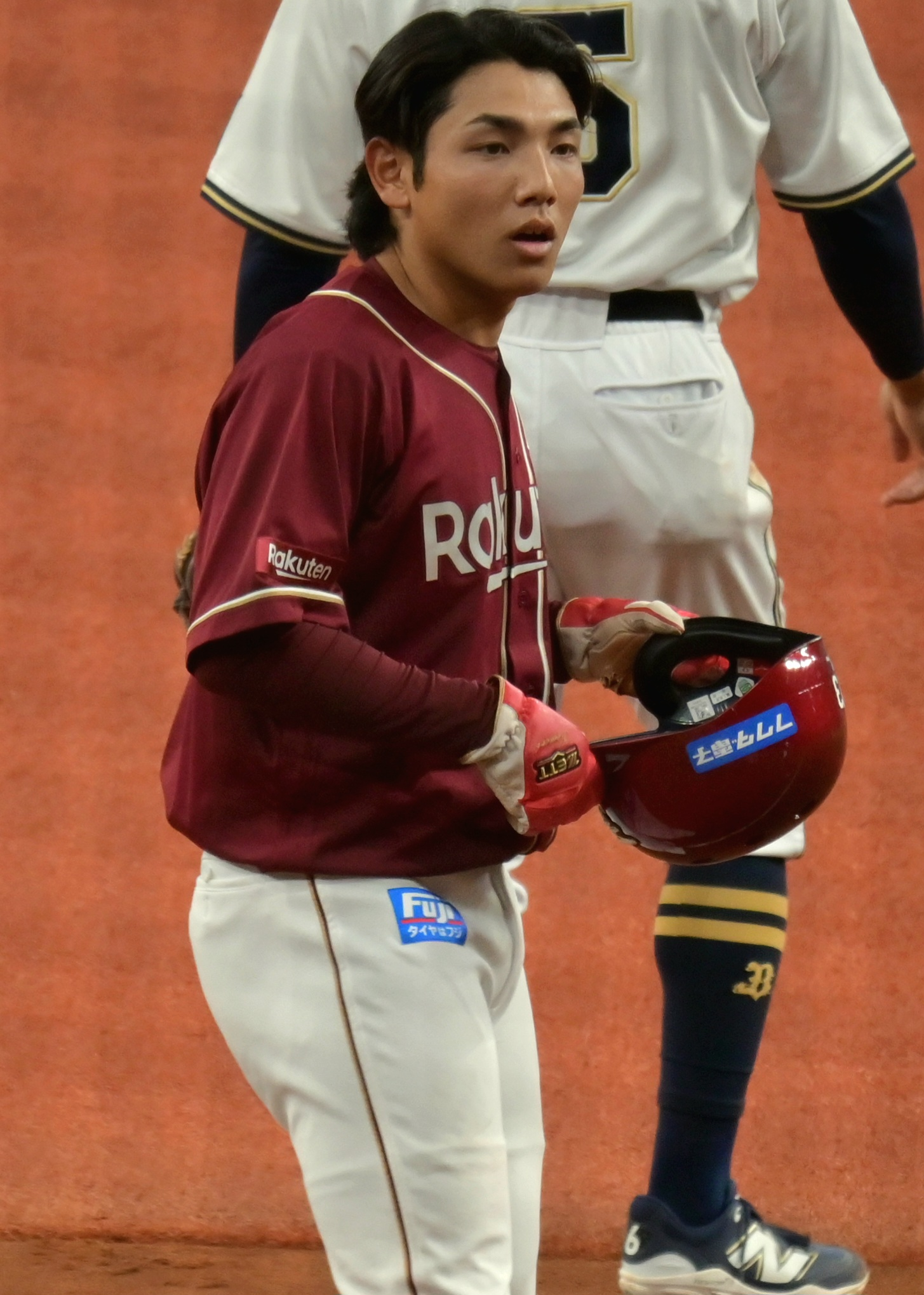
- Komori with the Tohoku Rakuten Golden Eagles in 2025

Tohoku Rakuten Golden Eagles – No. 73
- Infielder
- Born: April 30, 2003 (age 23); Kitakyushu, Fukuoka, Japan
- Bats: Right Throws: Right

NPB debut
- September 6, 2024, for the Tokyo Yakult Swallows

NPB statistics (through 2025 season)
- Batting average: .185
- Home runs: 1
- RBI: 3
- Hits: 15
- Stolen base: 5
- Sacrifice bunt: 0
- Stats at Baseball Reference

Teams
- Tokyo Yakult Swallows (2022–2024); Tohoku Rakuten Golden Eagles (2025–present)

Kōtarō Komori (小森 航大郎, Komori Kōtarō; born April 30, 2003) is a professional Japanese baseball player. He plays infielder for the Tohoku Rakuten Golden Eagles.

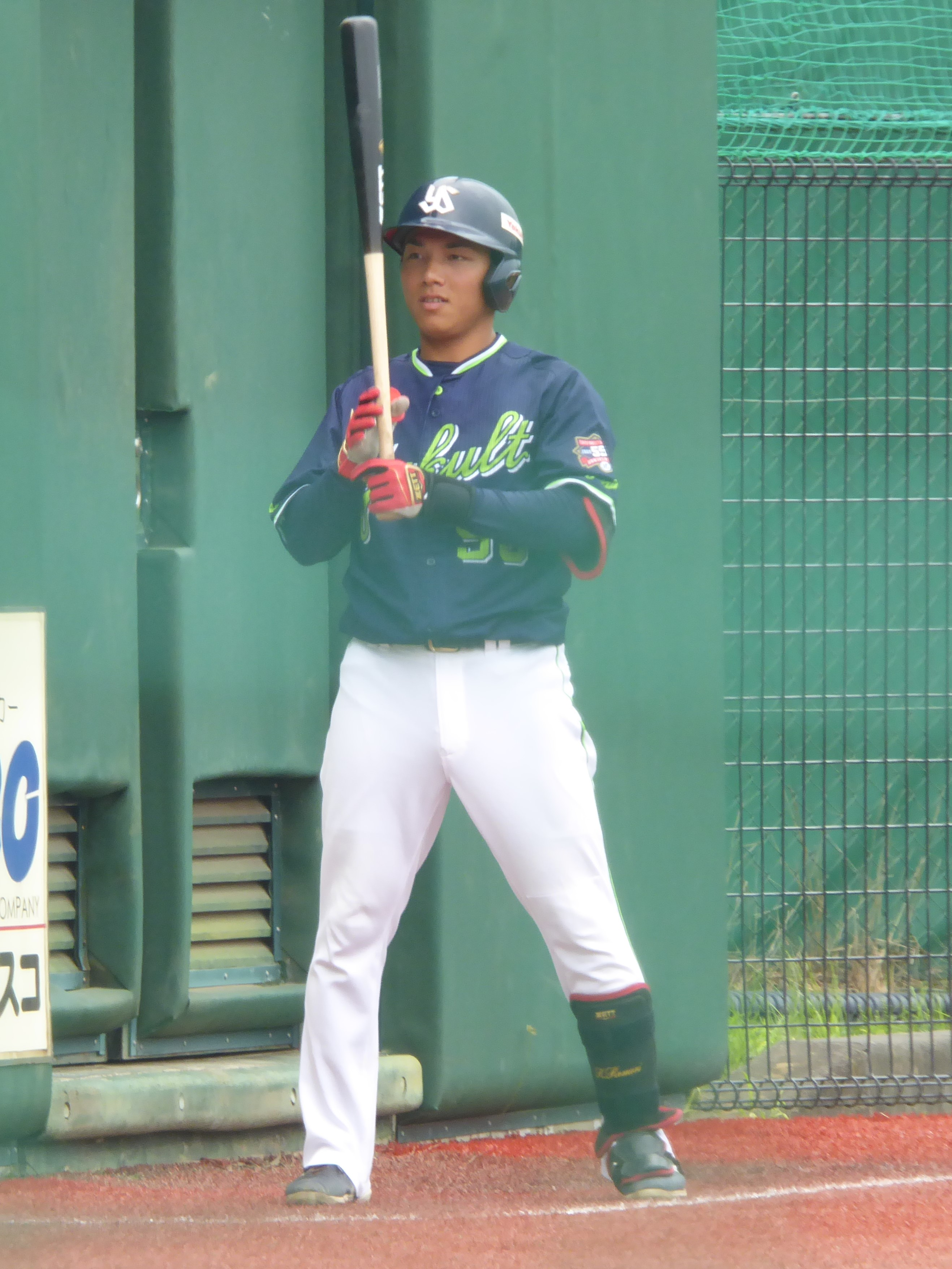
Komori with the Tokyo Yakult Swallows in 2024
