= Takumi Kurohara =

Japanese baseball player (born 1999)

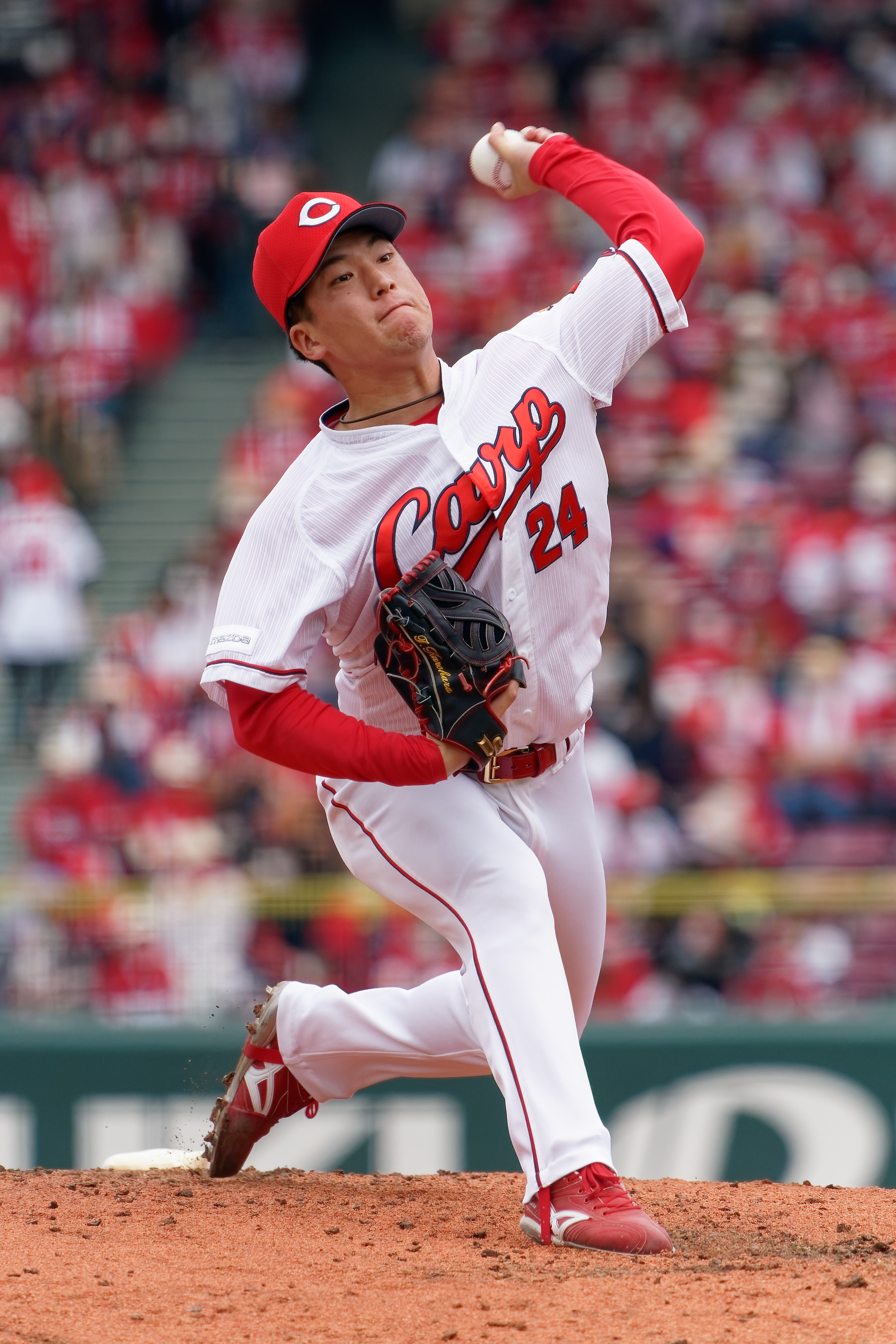

Hiroshima Toyo Carp – No. 24
- Pitcher
- Born: November 29, 1999 (age 26); Kainan, Wakayama, Japan
- Bats: Left Throws: Left

NPB debut
- March 29, 2022, for the Hiroshima Toyo Carp

Career statistics (through 2024 season)
- Win–loss record: 4–4
- Earned run average: 3.95
- Strikeouts: 91
- Saves: 0
- Holds: 4
- Stats at Baseball Reference

Teams
- Hiroshima Toyo Carp (2022–present)

Takumi Kurohara (黒原 拓未, Kurohara Takumi; born November 29, 1999, in Kainan, Wakayama, Japan) is a professional Japanese baseball player. He is a pitcher for the Hiroshima Toyo Carp of Nippon Professional Baseball (NPB).
