= Yukihiro Iwata =

Japanese baseball player (born 1997)

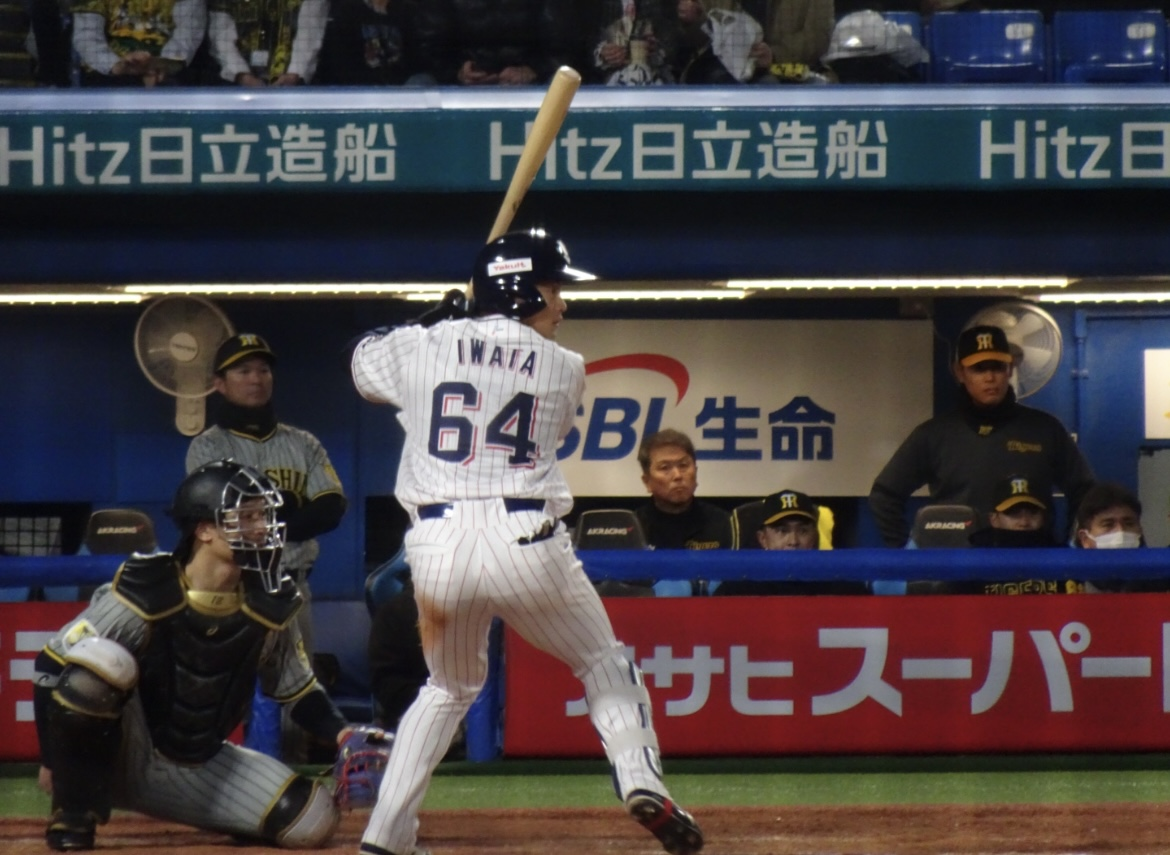

Tokyo Yakult Swallows – No. 64
- Outfielder
- Born: July 31, 1997 (age 28); Himeji, Hyōgo, Japan
- Bats: Left Throws: Left

NPB debut
- April 2, 2024, for the Tokyo Yakult Swallows

Career statistics (through 2024 season)
- Batting average: .228
- Hits: 28
- Home runs: 1
- RBIs: 7
- Stolen bases: 10
- Stats at Baseball Reference

Teams
- Shinano Grandserows (2020–2021); Tokyo Yakult Swallows (2022–present)

Yukihiro Iwata (岩田 幸宏, Iwata Yukihiro; born July 31, 1997 in Himeji, Hyōgo, Japan) is a professional Japanese baseball player. He plays outfielder for the Tokyo Yakult Swallows.
