= Yamato Shiroki =

Japanese baseball player (born 2003)

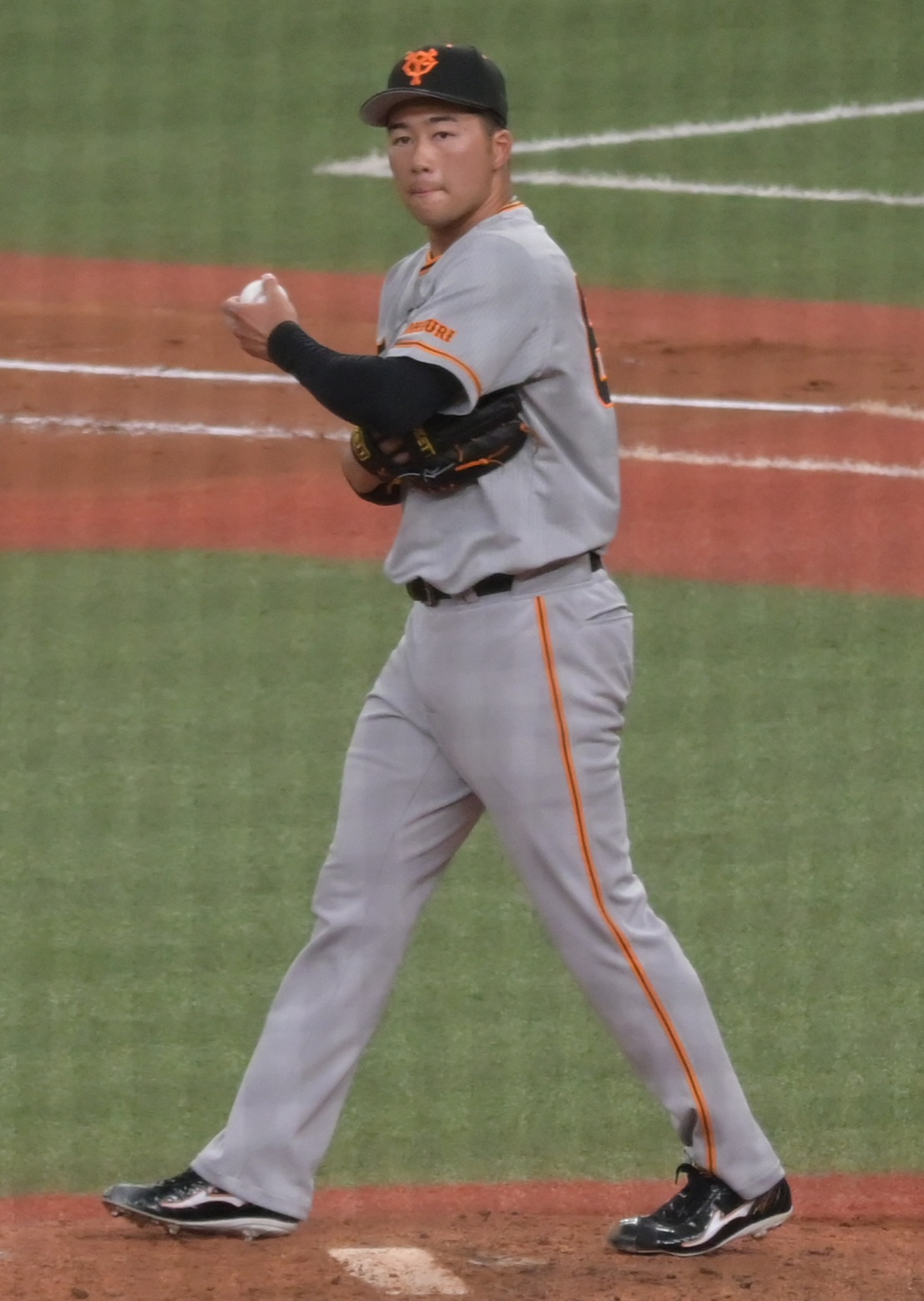

Yomiuri Giants – No. 25
- Pitcher
- Born: September 8, 2003 (age 22); Shikokuchūō, Ehime, Japan
- Bats: Left Throws: Left

NPB debut
- April 4, 2023, for the Yomiuri Giants

Career statistics (through August 1, 2026)
- Win-Loss: 0–0
- Earned run average: 4.57
- Strikeouts: 18

Teams
- Yomiuri Giants (2024, 2026–Present)

Yamato Shiroki (代木 大和, Shiroki Yamato; born September 8, 2003) is a professional Japanese baseball player. He pitches for the Yomiuri Giants.

Shinogi was selected in the 6th round of the 2021 Nippon Professional Baseball draft.
