= Kō Matsukawa =

Japanese baseball player (born 2003)

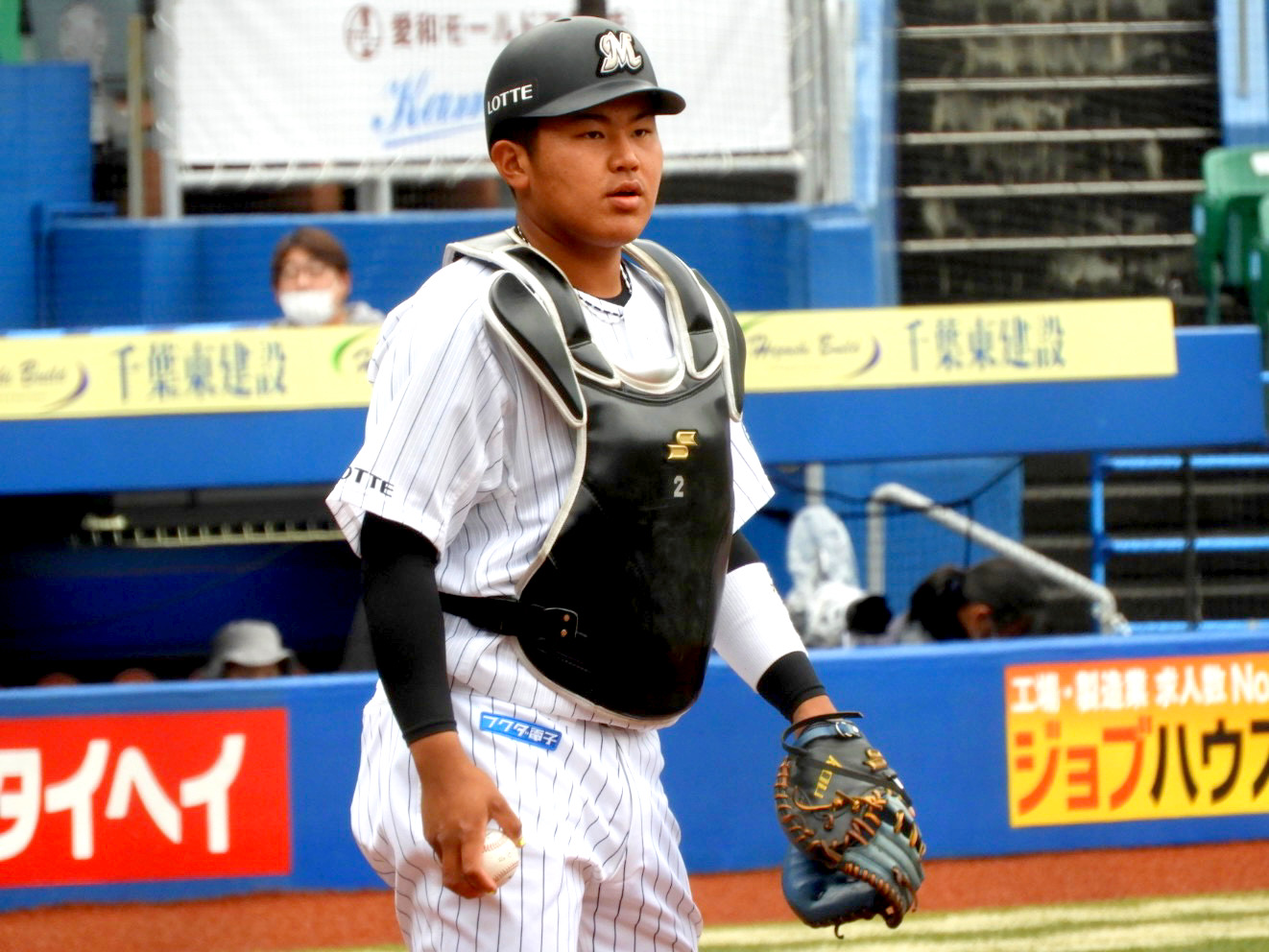

Chiba Lotte Marines – No. 2
- Catcher
- Born: October 20, 2003 (age 22); Hannan, Osaka, Japan
- Bats: Right Throws: Right

NPB debut
- March 25, 2022, for the Chiba Lotte Marines

NPB statistics (through 2025 season)
- Batting average: .169
- Home runs: 0
- Runs batted in: 15

Teams
- Chiba Lotte Marines (2022–present)

Career highlights and awards
- NPB All-Star (2022); Chiba City Special Award "New Era Hometown Impressive Award" (2022); NPB All-Star Fighting Player Award (2022)

Kō Matsukawa (松川虎生, Matsukawa Kou; born October 20, 2003) is a Japanese professional baseball catcher for the Chiba Lotte Marines of Nippon Professional Baseball (NPB).

== Career ==
On April 10, 2022, Matsukawa caught Rōki Sasaki's perfect game. He also had three runs batted in during the game.
