= Ukyō Maegawa =

Japanese baseball player (born 2003)

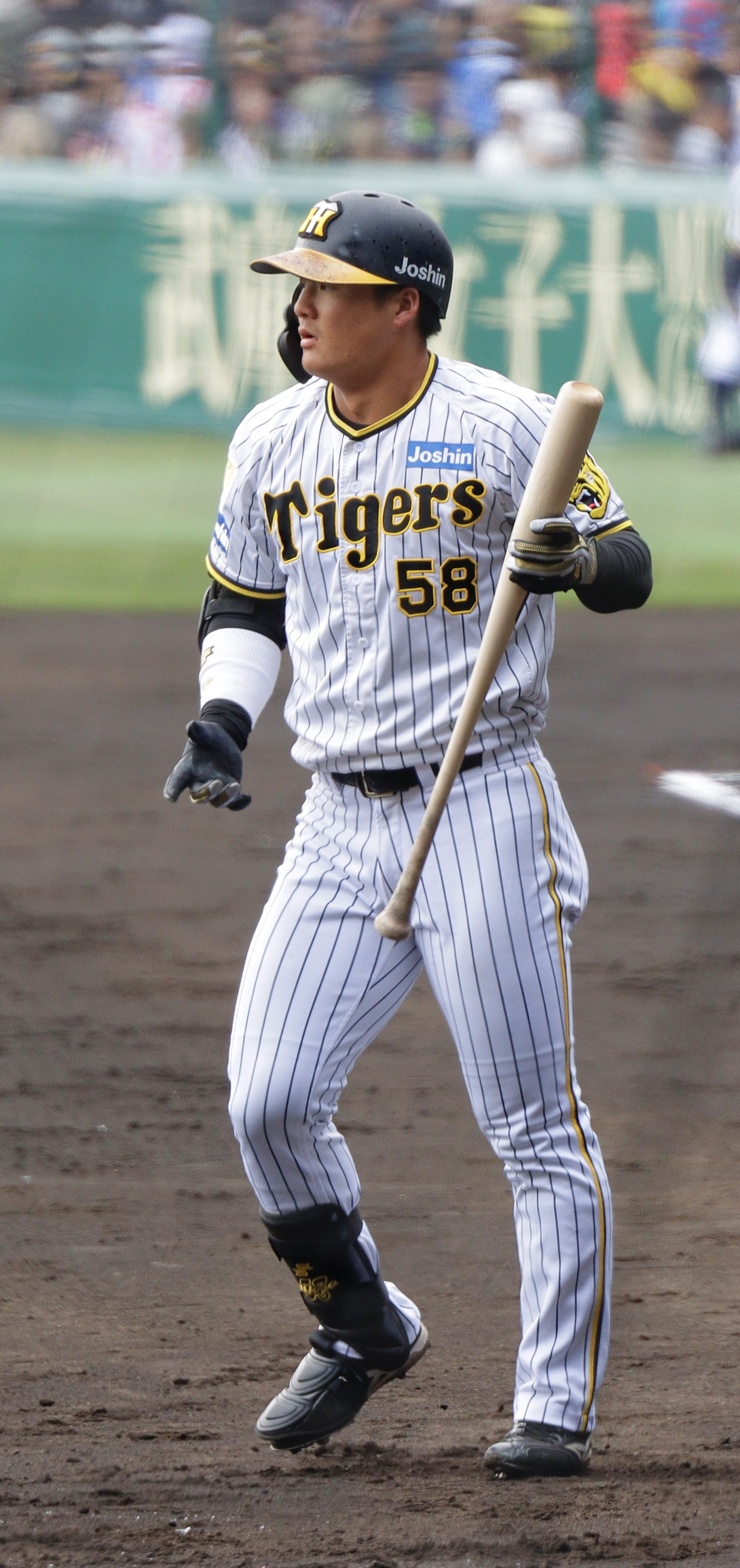

Hanshin Tigers – No. 58
- Outfielder
- Born: May 18, 2003 (age 23); Tsu, Mie, Japan
- Bats: Left Throws: Left

NPB debut
- May 30, 2023, for the Hanshin Tigers

NPB statistics (through 2024 season)
- Batting average: .266
- Hits: 111
- Home runs: 4
- RBI: 49
- Stolen bases: 0

Teams
- Hanshin Tigers (2022–present)

Ukyō Maegawa (前川 右京, Maegawa Ukyō; born May 18, 2003) is a professional Japanese baseball player. He is an outfielder for the Hanshin Tigers of Nippon Professional Baseball (NPB).
