= Kōsuke Ukai =

Japanese baseball player (born 1999)

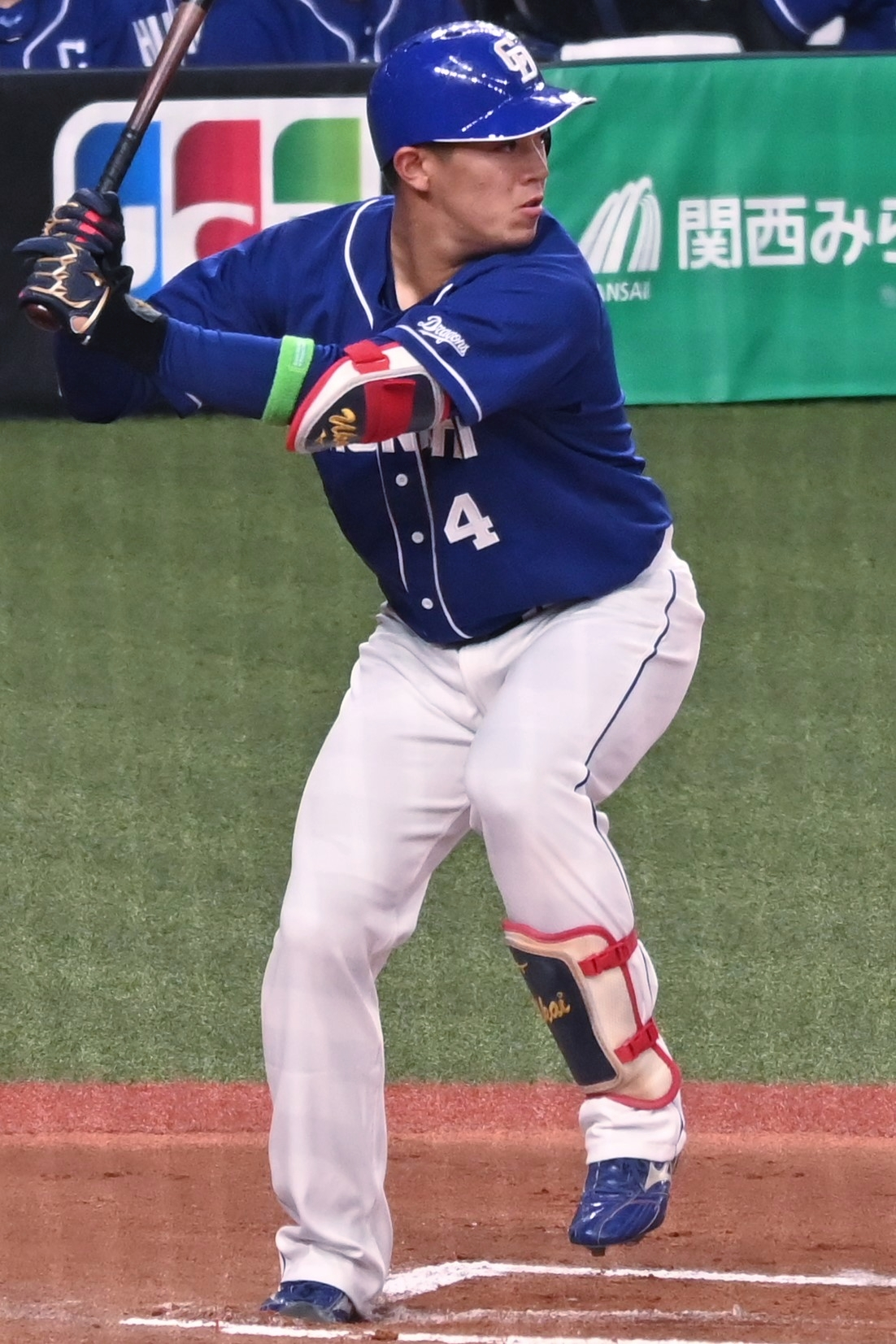

Chunichi Dragons – No. 66
- Outfielder
- Born: May 30, 1999 (age 26); Higashi-ku, Nagoya, Japan
- Bats: Right Throws: Right

NPB debut
- March 25, 2022, for the Chunichi Dragons

Career statistics (through 2024 season)
- Batting average: .185
- Home runs: 7
- RBIs: 24

Teams
- Chunichi Dragons (2022-present)

Kōsuke Ukai (鵜飼航丞, Ukai Kōsuke; born May 30, 1999) is a professional Japanese baseball player. He is an outfielder for the Chunichi Dragons of Nippon Professional Baseball (NPB).
