= Shota Suekane =

Japanese baseball player (born 1996)

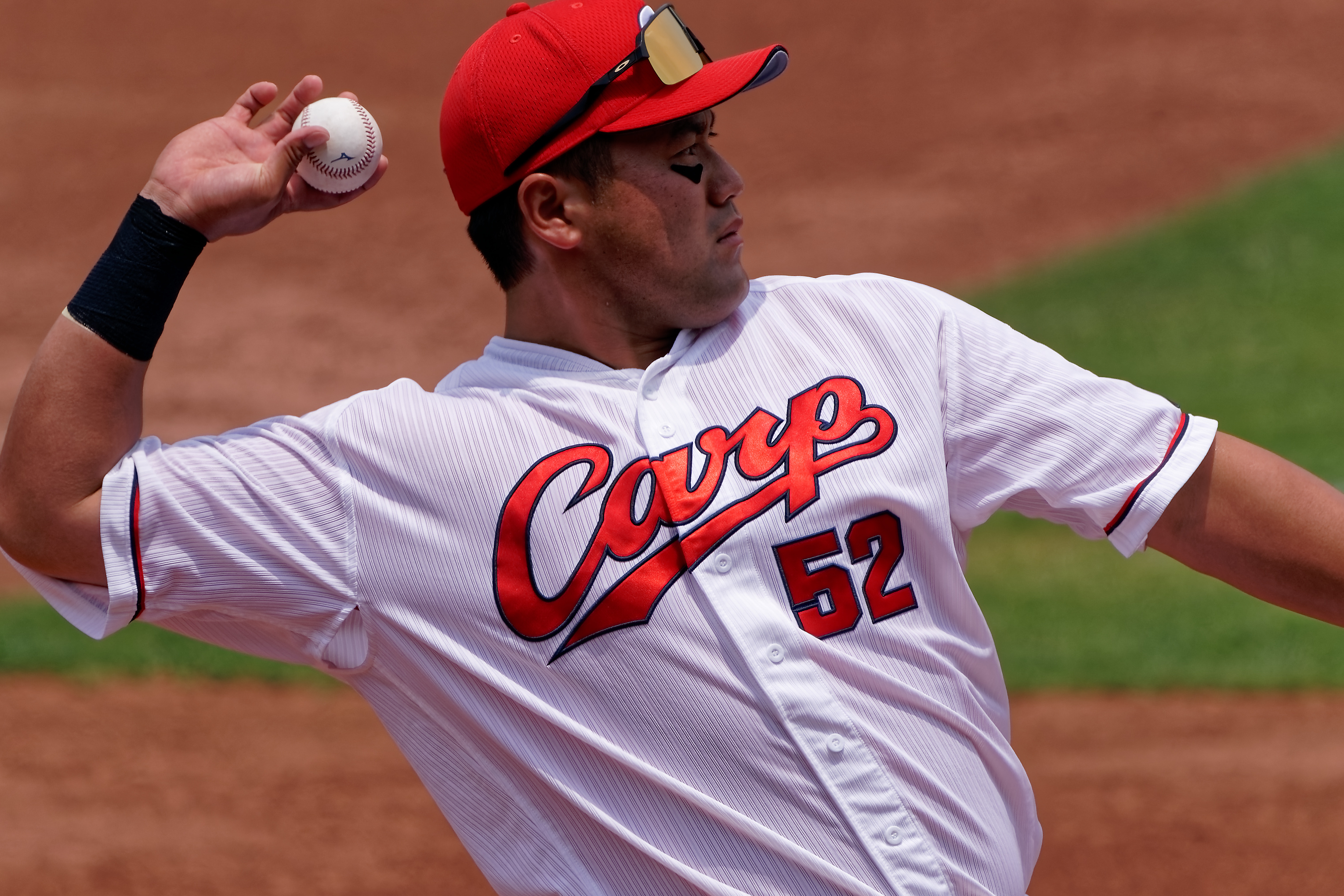

Hiroshima Toyo Carp – No. 52
- Outfielder
- Born: May 27, 1996 (age 29); Sakaide, Kagawa, Japan
- Bats: Right Throws: Right

NPB debut
- March 25, 2022, for the Hiroshima Toyo Carp

Career statistics (through May 9, 2025)
- Batting Average: .265
- Home Runs: 26
- RBIs: 104

Teams
- Hiroshima Toyo Carp (2022–present)

Shota Suekane (末包 昇大, Shota Suekane; born May 27, 1996 in Sakaide, Kagawa, Japan) is a Japanese professional baseball outfielder for the Hiroshima Toyo Carp of Nippon Professional Baseball (NPB).
