= Daigo Kamikawabata =

Japanese baseball player (born 1997)

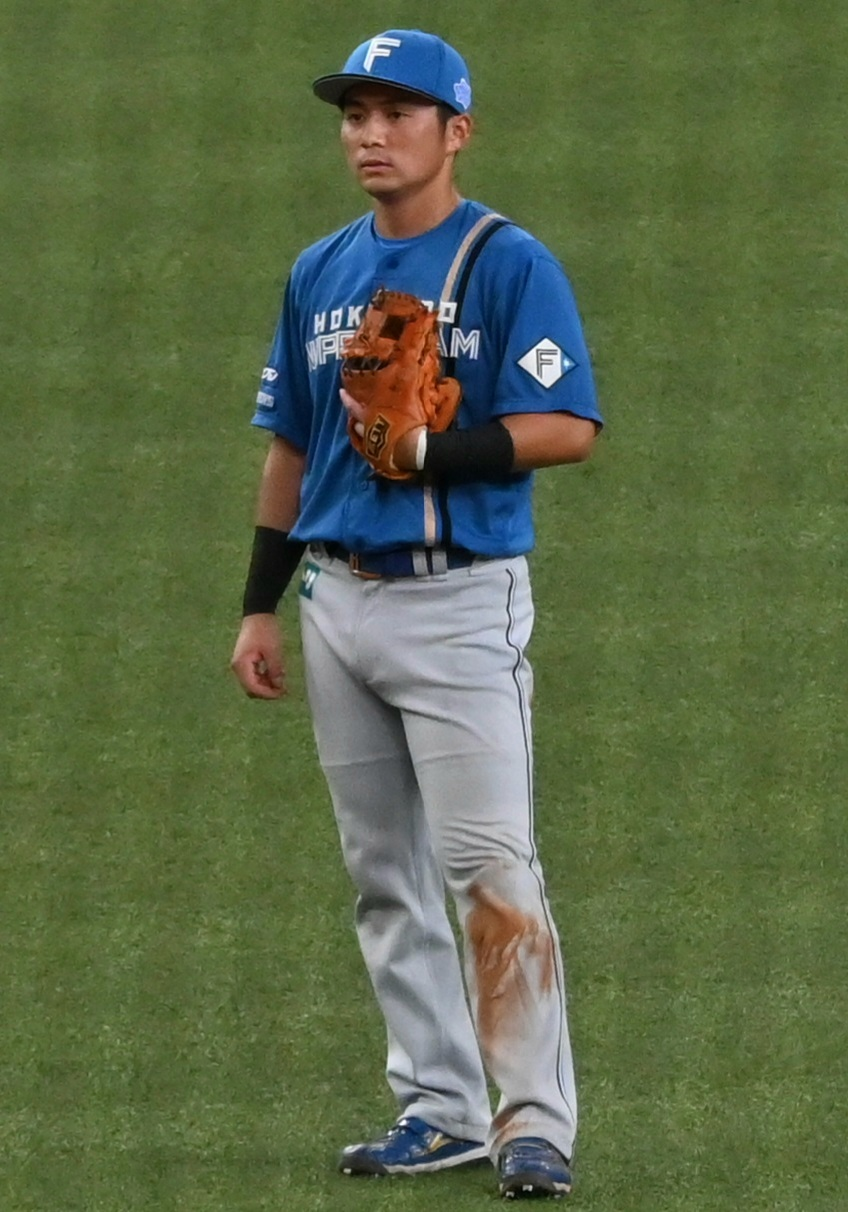

Hokkaido Nippon Ham Fighters – No. 4
- Infielder
- Born: January 12, 1997 (age 29); Kurashiki, Okayama, Japan
- Bats: Left Throws: Right

debut
- May 24, 2022, for the Hokkaido Nippon-Ham Fighters

NPB statistics (through 2022 season)
- Batting average: .291
- Hits: 76
- Home runs: 2
- Runs batted in: 17
- Stolen base: 8
- Stats at Baseball Reference

Teams
- Hokkaido Nippon-Ham Fighters (2022–present)

Career highlights and awards
- NPB All-Star (2024)

Daigo Kamikawabata (上川畑 大悟, Kamikawabata Daigo; born January 12, 1997) is a Japanese professional baseball infielder for the Hokkaido Nippon-Ham Fighters of Nippon Professional Baseball (NPB).
