= Chihiro Sumida =

Japanese baseball player (born 1999)

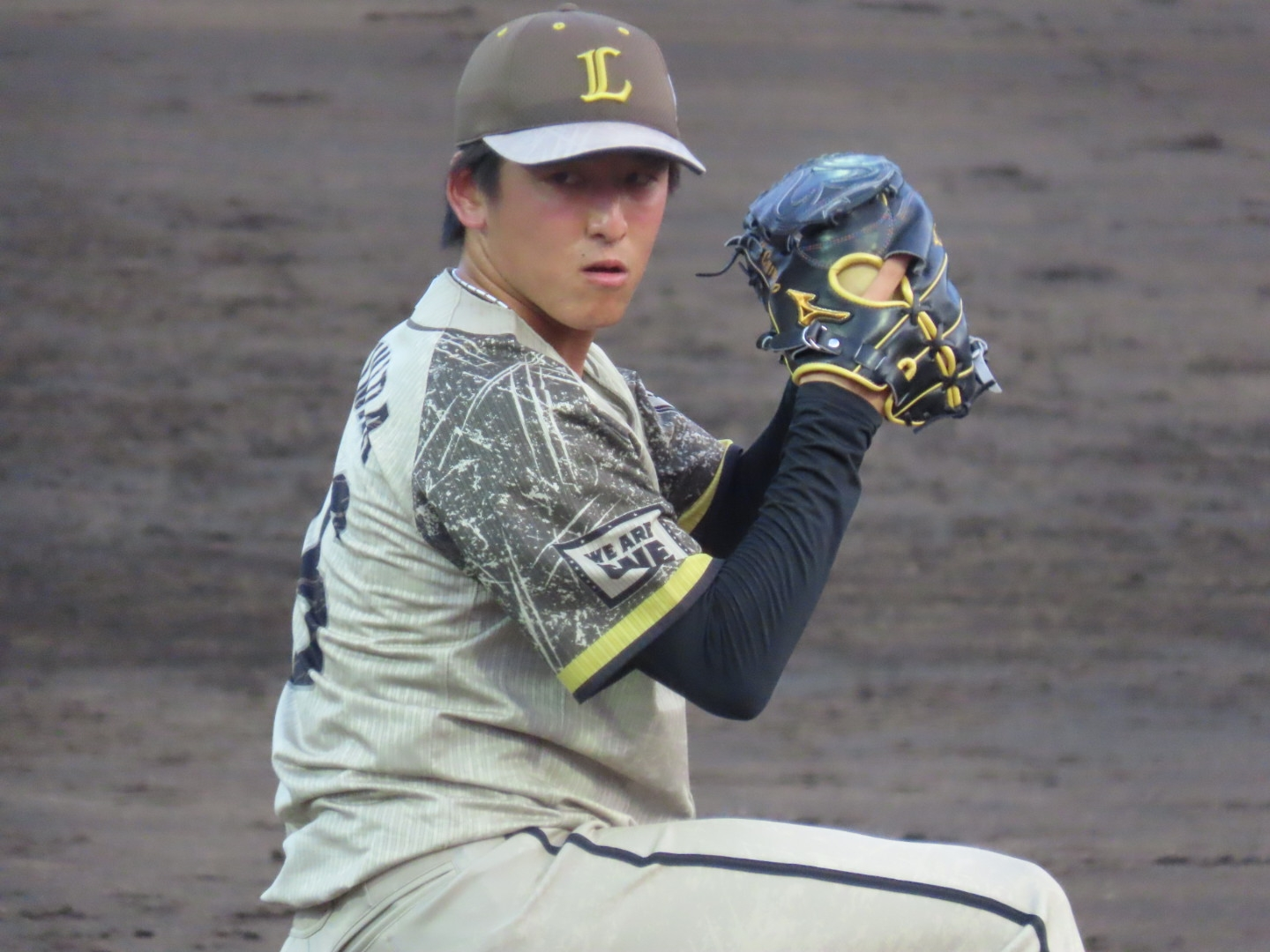

Saitama Seibu Lions – No. 16
- Pitcher
- Born: August 20, 1999 (age 27); Ōmura, Nagasaki, Japan
- Bats: Left Throws: Left

NPB debut
- March 26, 2022, for the Saitama Seibu Lions

NPB statistics (through 2025 season)
- Win–loss record: 29–40
- Earned Run Average: 3.02
- Strikeouts: 504
- Stats at Baseball Reference

Teams
- Saitama Seibu Lions (2022–present)

Career highlights and awards
- NPB All-Star (2025)
Medals
Men's baseball
Representing Japan
WBSC Premier12
Silver medal – second place	2024	Team

Chihiro Sumida (隅田 知一郎, Sumida Chihiro; born August 8, 1999) is a Japanese professional baseball pitcher for the Saitama Seibu Lions of Nippon Professional Baseball (NPB).
