= Hikaru Yamashita (baseball) =

Japanese baseball player (born 1999)

- Pitcher
- Born: September 12, 1999 (age 26); Kisarazu, Chiba, Japan
- Batted: Left Threw: Left

NPB debut
- September 22, 2022, for the Tokyo Yakult Swallows

Last NPB appearance
- October 27, 2022, for the Tokyo Yakult Swallows

Career statistics
- Win–loss record: 1–1
- Earned Run Average: 1.46
- Strikeouts: 3
- Saves: 0
- Holds: 0
- Stats at Baseball Reference

Teams
- Tokyo Yakult Swallows (2022–2025)

Hikaru Yamashita (山下 輝, Yamashita Hikaru; born September 12, 1999 in Kisarazu, Chiba, Japan) is a professional Japanese baseball player. He plays pitcher for the Tokyo Yakult Swallows.
