= Keita Kameda =

Japanese baseball player (born 1999)

Keita Kamida
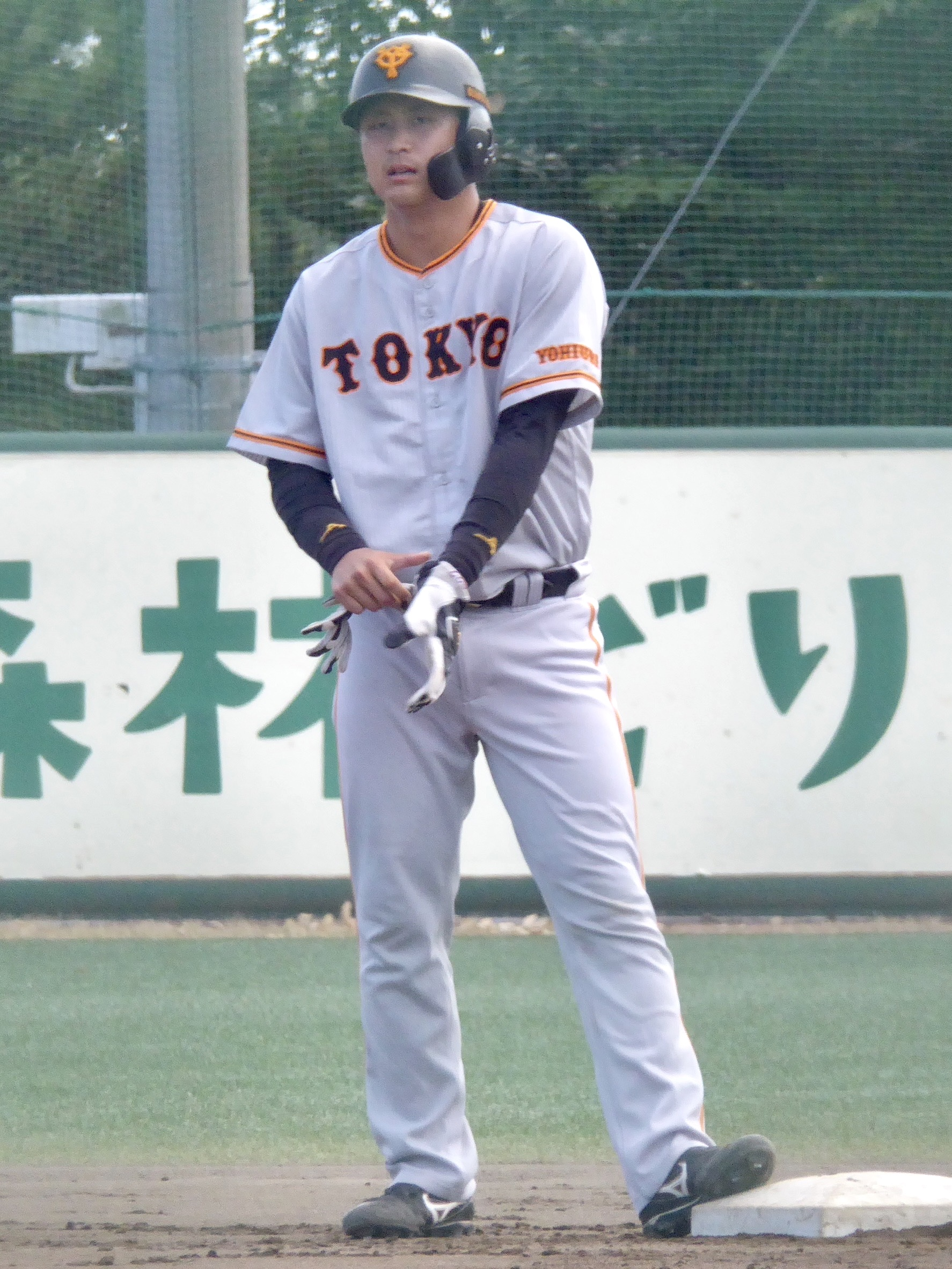

Yomiuri Giants – No. 22
- Catcher
- Born: April 9, 1999 (age 27); Hiratsuka, Kanagawa, Japan
- Bats: Right Throws: Right

Keita Kameda (亀田 啓太, Kameda Keita; born 9 April 1999) is a professional baseball player born from Hiratsuka, Kanagawa Prefecture.

== Career ==
=== Before professional baseball ===
He started playing baseball during his time in Sagami Elementary School and was devoted to being a catcher. He was associated with Japanese-style baseball in Ōno Junior High School.

He was on the bench during his first summer at the 97th National High School Baseball Championship, and on his second spring, he participated as the starting catcher at the 88th National High School Baseball Invitational Tournament during his time at Tokai University Kofu Senior High School.

On October 11, 2021, he was assigned as the 3rd draft pick of the Developmental Player System for the Yomiuri Giants at the 2021 Nippon Professional Baseball draft. On November 25, 2021, he agreed to join the team with an advanced payment of 2,900,000 yen and an annual salary of 4,000,000 yen. His number is 22.
