= Akito Takabe =

Japanese baseball player (born 1997)

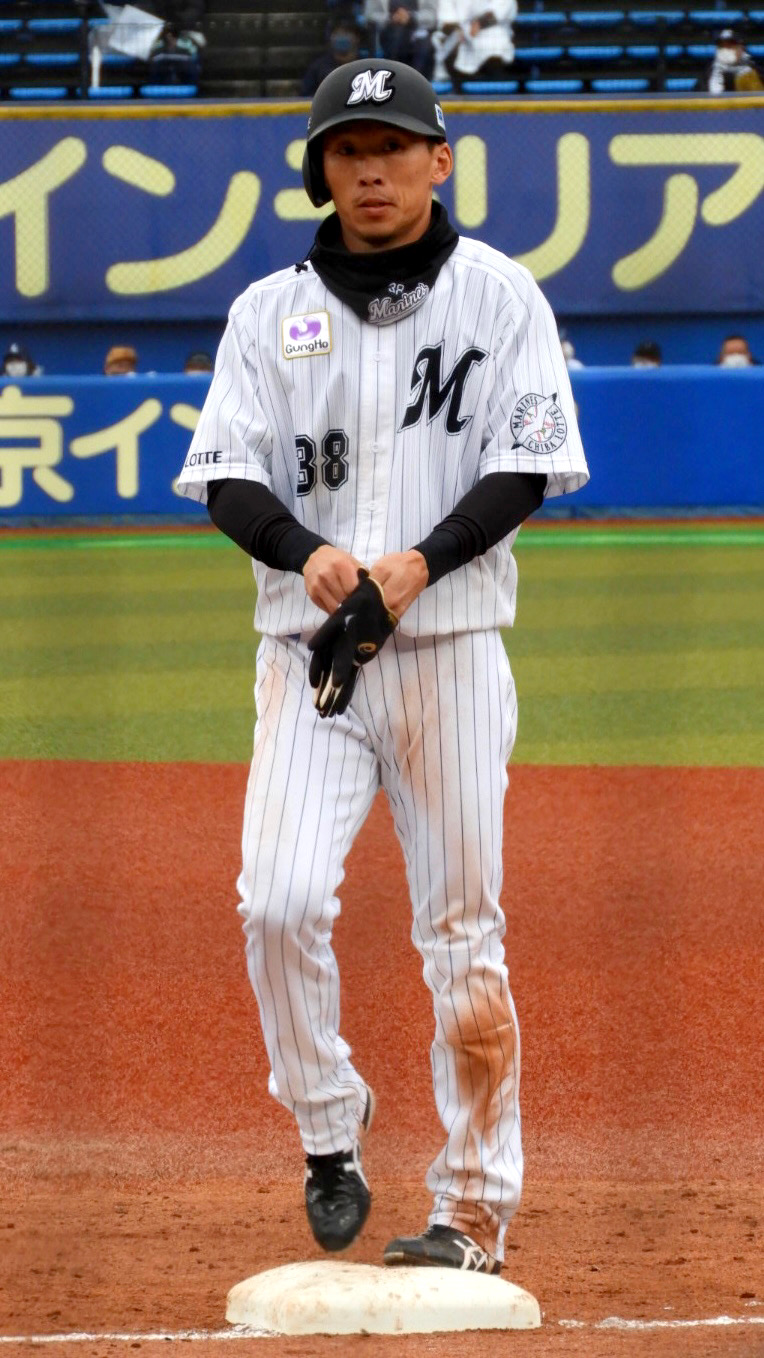

Chiba Lotte Marines – No. 0
- Outfielder
- Born: December 11, 1997 (age 28); Samukawa, Kanagawa, Japan
- Bats: Left Throws: Right

NPB debut
- October 6, 2020, for the Chiba Lotte Marines

Career statistics (through 2024 season)
- Batting average: .271
- Home runs: 5
- RBIs: 67
- Stolen Bases: 58
- Stats at Baseball Reference

Teams
- Chiba Lotte Marines (2020-present)

Career highlights and awards
- 1× NPB All-Star (2022); 1× Pacific League stolen base champion (2022); 1× Mitsui Golden Glove Award (2022)

Akito Takabe (髙部 瑛斗, Takabe Akito; born December 11, 1997) is a professional Japanese baseball player. He is an outfielder for the Chiba Lotte Marines of Nippon Professional Baseball (NPB).
