= Naoki Arizono =

Japanese baseball player (born 2003)

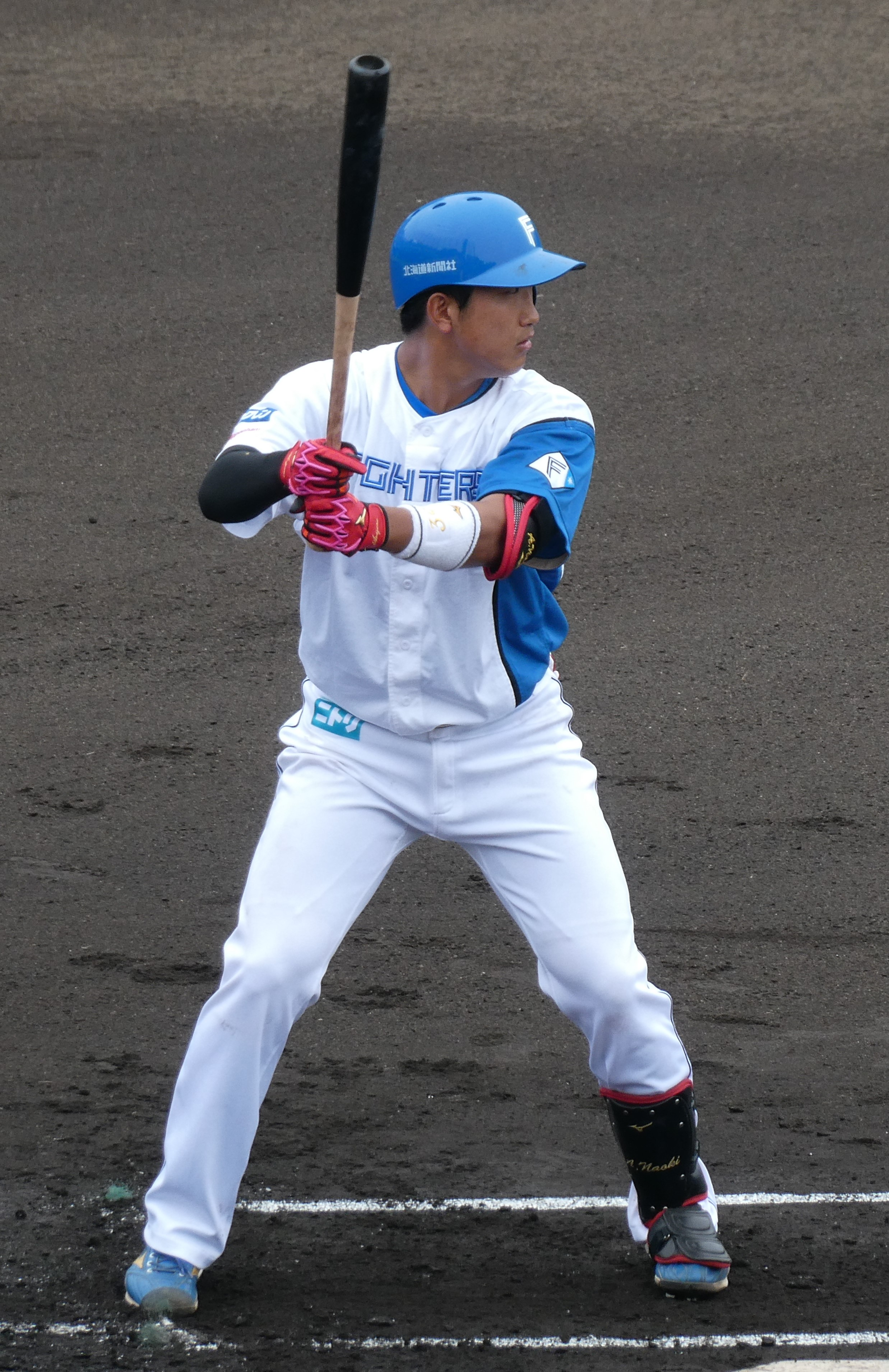

Hokkaido Nippon-Ham Fighters – No. 39
- Infielder
- Born: May 21, 2003 (age 23); Asahi, Chiba, Japan
- Bats: Right Throws: Right

NPB debut
- June 21, 2022, for the Hokkaido Nippon-Ham Fighters

NPB statistics (through 2025 season)
- Batting average: .163
- Hits: 7
- Home runs: 0
- Runs batted in: 3
- Stolen base: 0

Teams
- Hokkaido Nippon-Ham Fighters (2022–present)

Naoki Arizono (有薗 直輝, Arizono Naoki; born May 21, 2003) is a Japanese professional baseball infielder for the Hokkaido Nippon-Ham Fighters in Nippon Professional Baseball.
