= Kenta Kozono =

Japanese baseball player (born 2003)

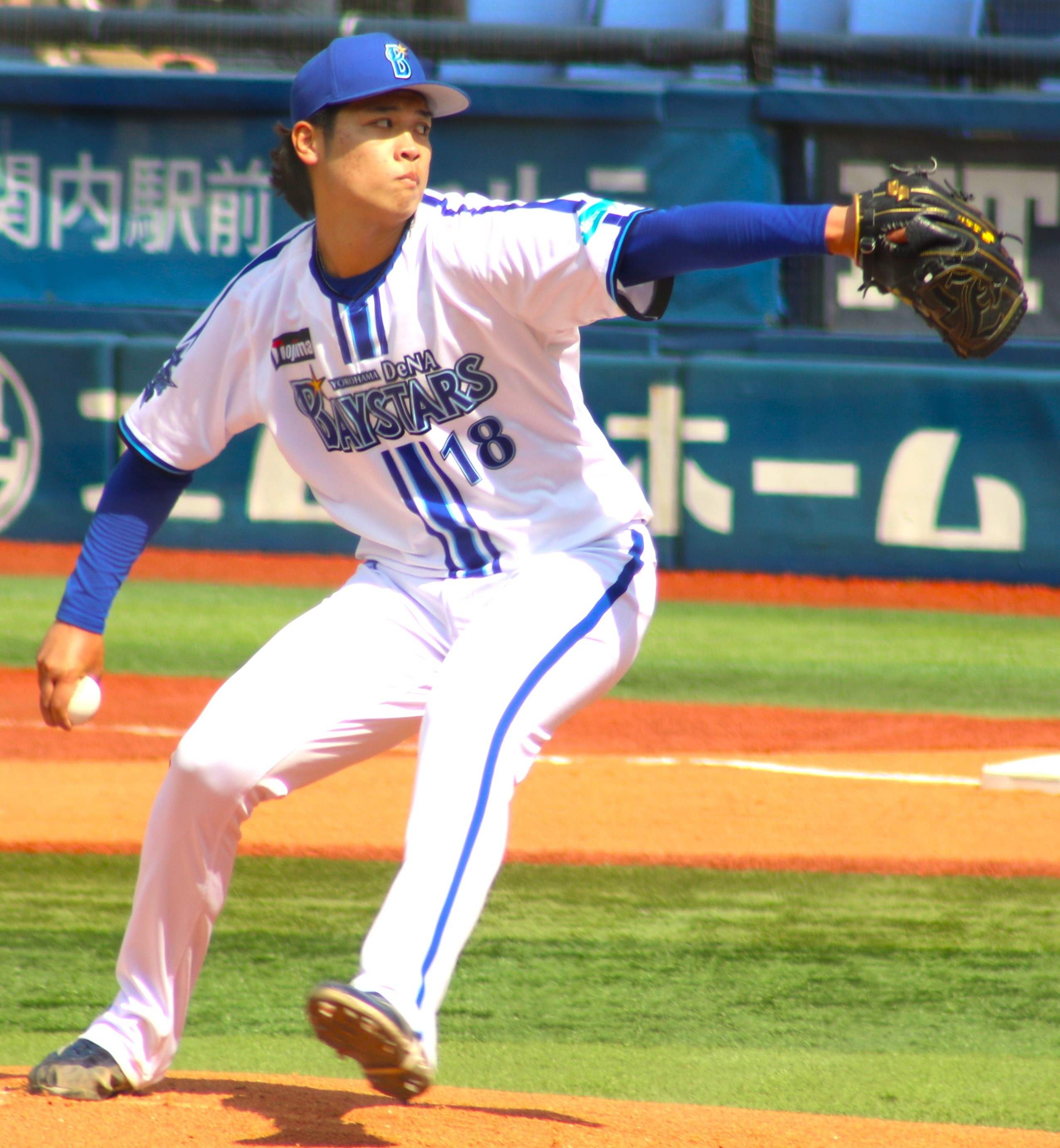
- Kozono with the Yokohama DeNA BayStars

Yokohama DeNA BayStars – No. 18
- Pitcher
- Born: April 9, 2003 (age 22); Kaizuka, Osaka, Japan
- Bats: Right Throws: Right

NPB debut
- April 10, 2024, for the Yokohama DeNA BayStars

Career statistics (through 2024 season)
- Win–loss record: 0–1
- Earned run average: 16.88
- Strikeouts: 3
- Saves: 0
- Holds: 0

Teams
- Yokohama DeNA BayStars (2022–present)

Career highlights and awards
- Japan Series champion (2024)

Kenta Kozono (小園 健太, Kozono Kenta; born April 9, 2003) is a professional Japanese baseball player. He is a pitcher for the Yokohama DeNA BayStars of Nippon Professional Baseball (NPB).
