= Sōma Tokuyama =

Japanese baseball player (born 1999)

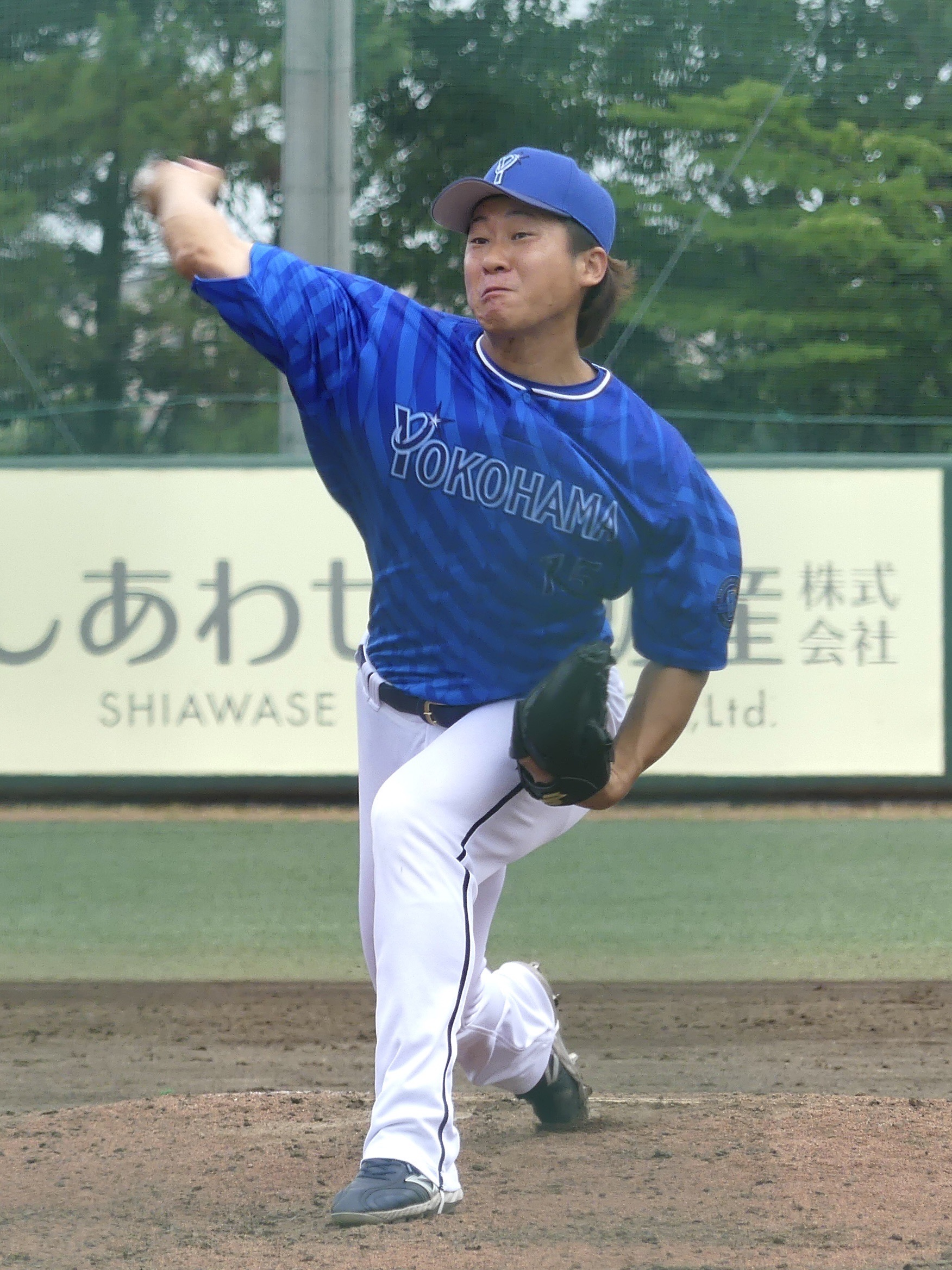
- Pitcher
- Born: June 6, 1999 (age 26); Himeji, Hyōgo, Japan
- Batted: Right Threw: Right

NPB debut
- March 30, 2024, for the Yokohama DeNA BayStars

Last NPB appearance
- July 9, 2024, for the Yokohama DeNA BayStars

Career statistics
- Win–loss record: 1–1
- Earned run average: 2.45
- Strikeouts: 12
- Saves: 0
- Holds: 8

Teams
- Yokohama DeNA BayStars (2022–2025)

Career highlights and awards
- Japan Series champion (2024)

Sōma Tokuyama (徳山 壮磨, Tokuyama Sōma; born June 6, 1999) is a professional Japanese baseball player. He is a pitcher for the Yokohama DeNA BayStars of Nippon Professional Baseball (NPB).
