= Hidetaka Okadome =

Japanese baseball player (born 1999)

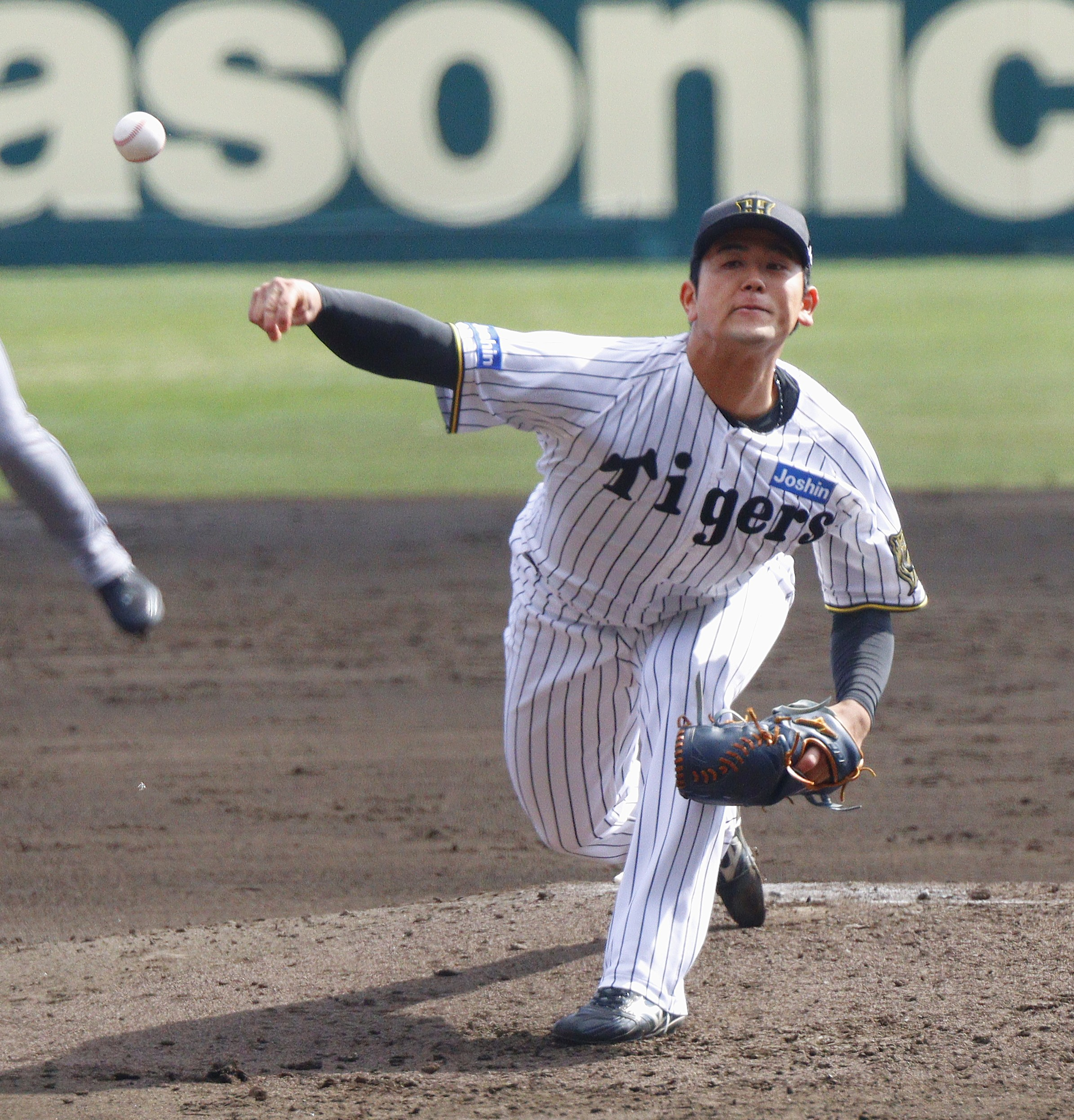

Hanshin Tigers – No. 64
- Pitcher
- Born: November 7, 1999 (age 26); Itoman, Okinawa, Japan
- Bats: Right Throws: Right

NPB debut
- July 23, 2023, for the Hanshin Tigers

Career statistics (through 2024 season)
- Win–loss record: 2-0
- Earned run average: 2.60
- Strikeouts: 30
- Saves: 1
- Holds: 6

Teams
- Hanshin Tigers (2023–present)

Hidetaka Okadome (岡留 英貴, Okadome Hidetaka; born November 7, 1999) is a professional Japanese baseball player. He is a pitcher for the Hanshin Tigers of Nippon Professional Baseball (NPB).
