= Atsuya Horie =

Japanese baseball player (born 1997)

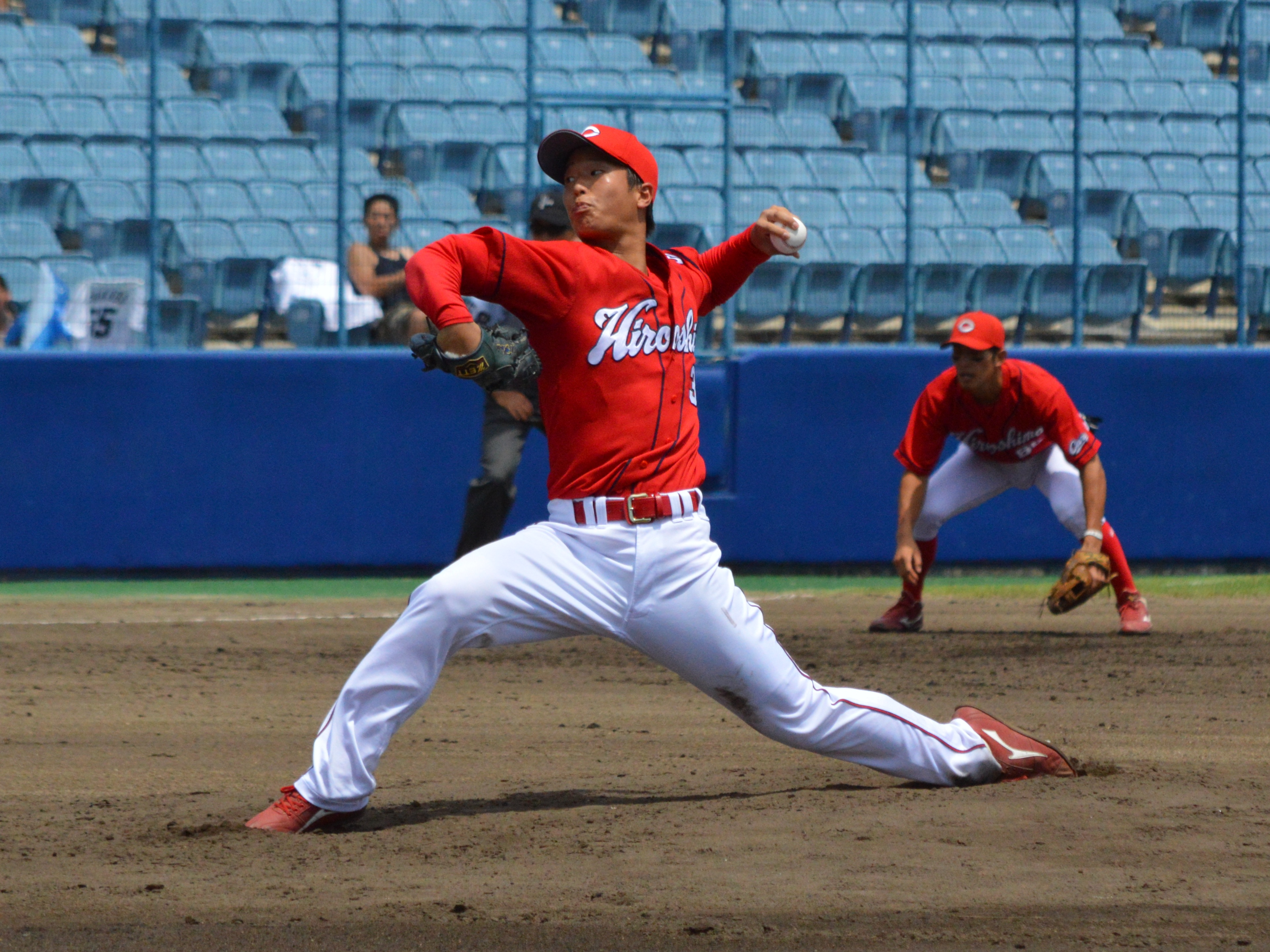

Hiroshima Toyo Carp – No. 36
- Pitcher
- Born: February 21, 1997 (age 29); Takamatsu, Kagawa, Japan
- Bats: Left Throws: Left

NPB debut
- September 11, 2016, for the Hiroshima Toyo Carp

Career statistics (through 2024 season)
- Win–loss record: 13-12
- Earned Run Average: 4.03
- Strikeouts: 155
- Saves: 0
- Holds: 60
- Stats at Baseball Reference

Teams
- Hiroshima Toyo Carp (2015–present)

Atsuya Horie (塹江 敦哉, Horie Atsuya; born February 21, 1997) is a professional Japanese baseball player. He plays pitcher for the Hiroshima Toyo Carp.
