= Ren Mukunoki =

Japanese baseball player (born 2000)

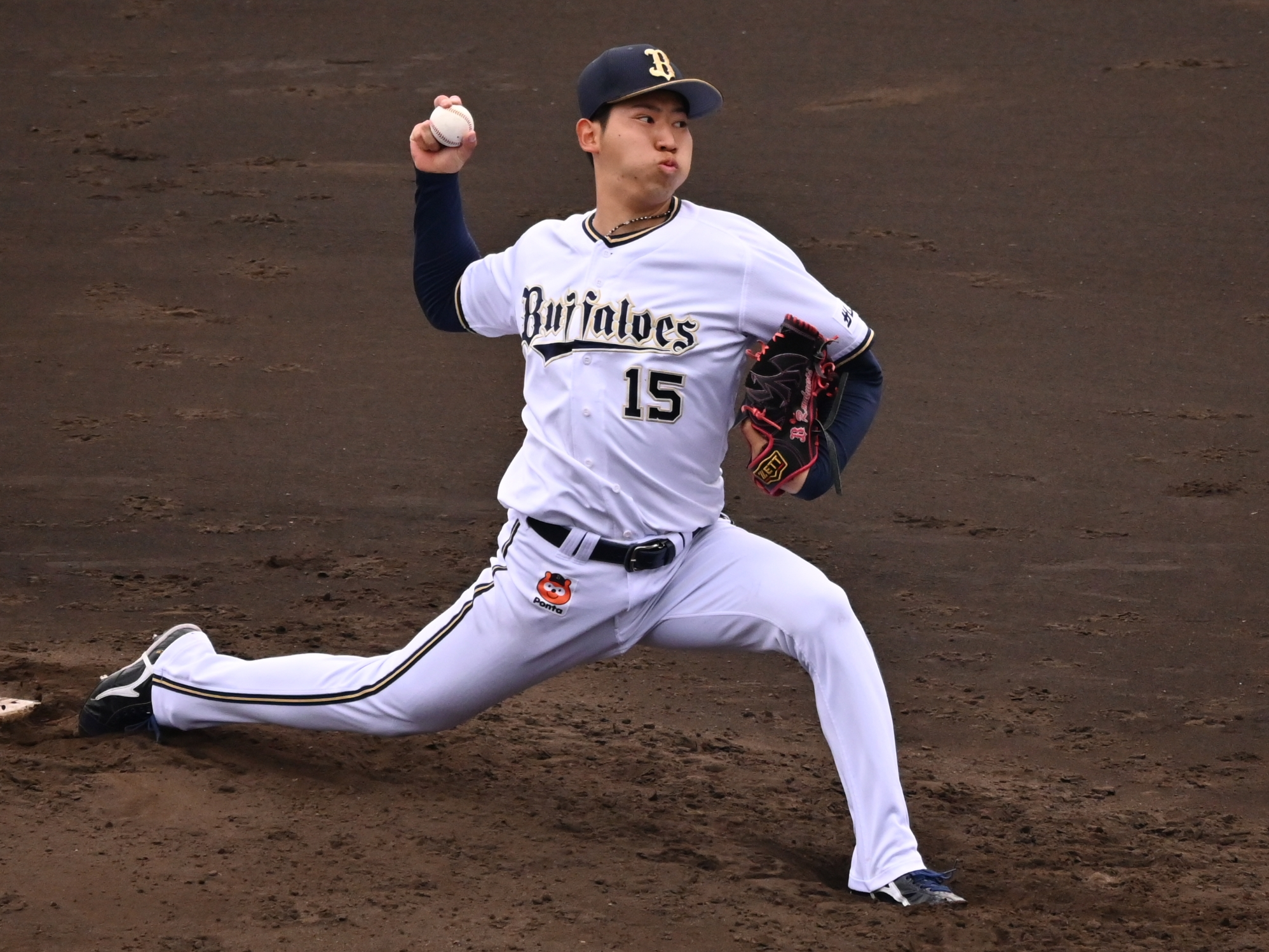

Orix Buffaloes – No. 15
- Pitcher
- Born: 22 January 2000 (age 26); San'yō-Onoda, Yamaguchi, Japan
- Bats: Right Throws: Right

NPB debut
- 7 July 2022, for the Orix Buffaloes

Career statistics (through 2025)
- Win–loss record: 3–4
- Earned run average: 4.72
- Strikeouts: 47

Teams
- Orix Buffaloes (2022–present)

Ren Mukunoki (椋木 蓮, Mukunoki Ren, born 22 January 2000) is a Japanese professional baseball pitcher for the Orix Buffaloes of the Nippon Professional Baseball (NPB).

== Professional career ==
Mukunoki debuted for the Buffaloes on 7 July 2022, against the Saitama Seibu Lions, where he allowed 2 hits, threw 7 strikeouts, and did not allow a run. In just his 2nd game against the Hokkaido Nippon-Ham Fighters, he was throwing a no hitter, when in the bottom of the 9th, with only 1 out to go, gave up his no-hitter on a single by Fighters infielder Ryusei Sato. Buffaloes closer Yoshihisa Hirano took over from there and struck out Kensuke Kondo to earn his 24th save.
