= Atsuya Hirohata =

Japanese baseball player (born 1997)

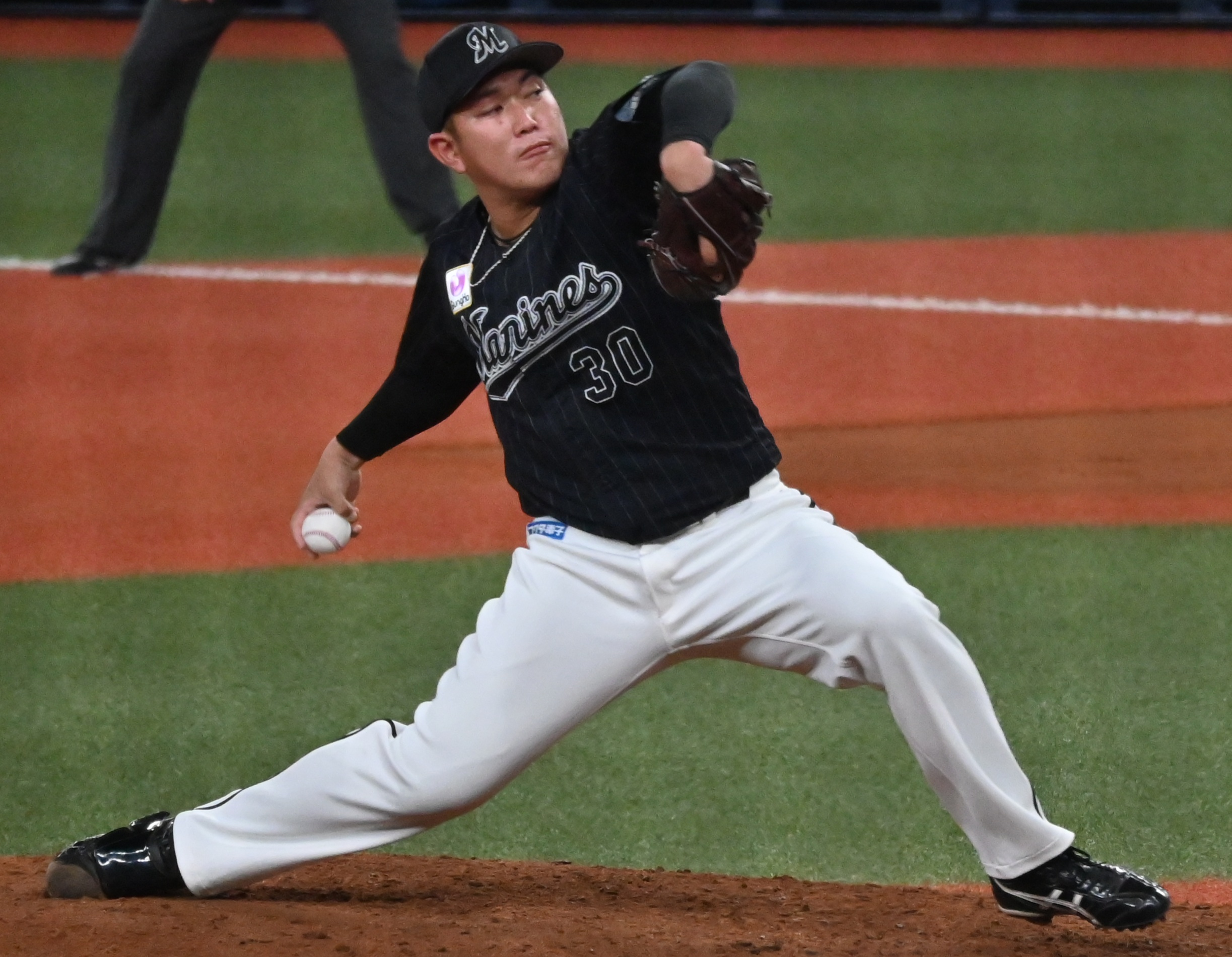

Chiba Lotte Marines – No. 30
- Pitcher
- Born: December 3, 1997 (age 28); Kurashiki, Okayama, Japan
- Bats: Right Throws: Right

NPB debut
- March 31, 2022, for the Chiba Lotte Marines

Career statistics (through 2024 season)
- Win–loss record: 1-2
- Earned run average: 4.73
- Strikeouts: 49
- Saves: 1
- Holds: 4

Teams
- Chiba Lotte Marines (2022–present)

Atsuya Hirohata (廣畑敦也, Hirohata Atsuya; born December 3, 1997) is a professional Japanese baseball player. He is a pitcher for the Chiba Lotte Marines of Nippon Professional Baseball (NPB).
