= Atsuya Kogita =

Japanese baseball player (born 1998)

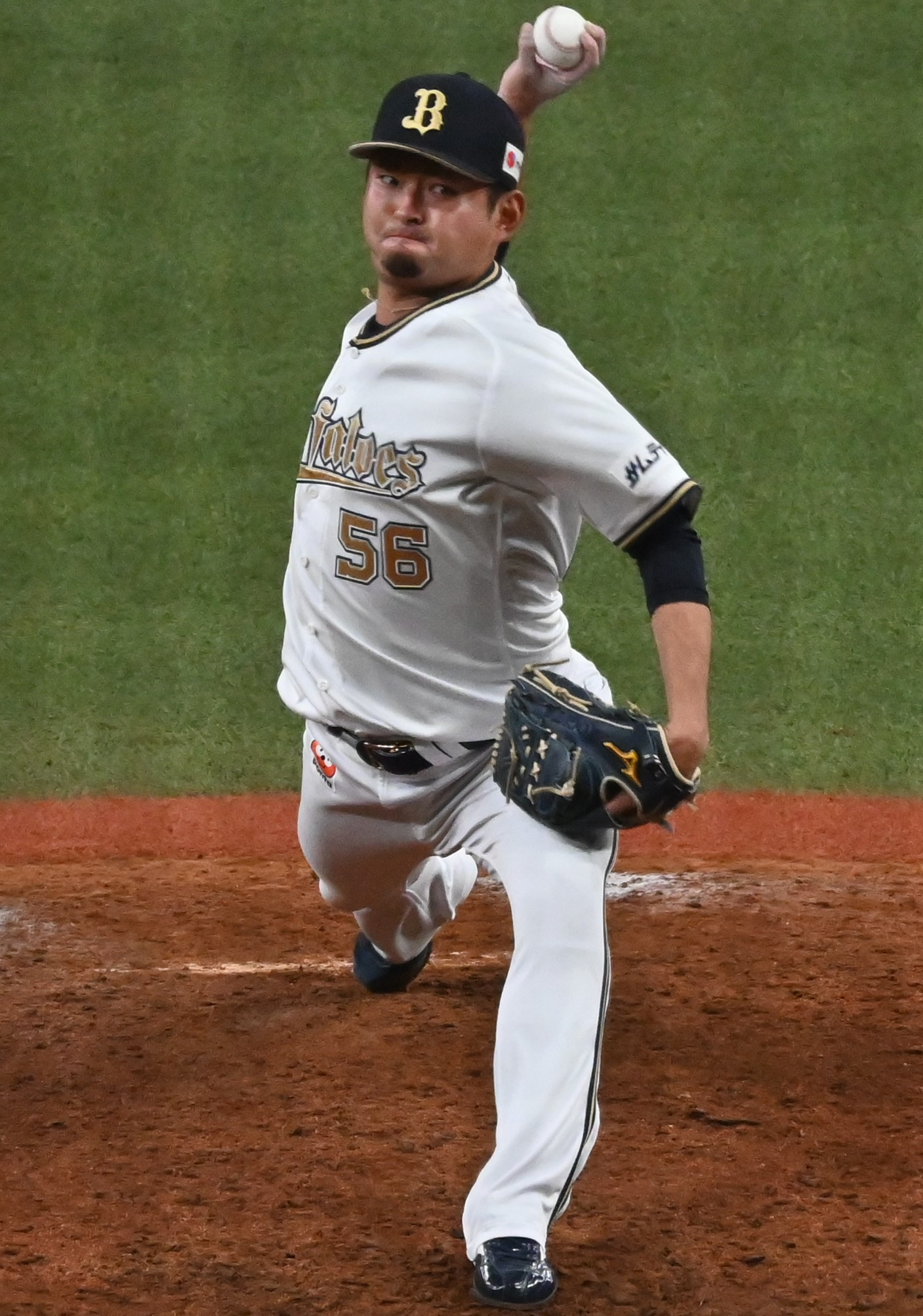

Orix Buffaloes – No. 56
- Pitcher
- Born: October 10, 1998 (age 27); Semboku, Akita, Japan
- Bats: Right Throws: Right

NPB debut
- March 26, 2022, for the Orix Buffaloes

Career statistics (through 2024 season)
- Win–loss record: 5–1
- Earned run average: 2.23
- Strikeouts: 61

Teams
- Orix Buffaloes (2022–present)

Career highlights and awards
- Japan Series champion (2022)

Atsuya Kogita (小木田 敦也, Kogita Atsuya; born October 10, 1998) is a professional Japanese baseball pitcher for the Orix Buffaloes of Nippon Professional Baseball (NPB).

== Career ==
Kogita made his professional debut in 2022 with the Orix Buffaloes.

On April 16, 2025, it was announced that Kogita would require Tommy John surgery, ruling him out for the entirety of the season.
