= 2022 Nippon Professional Baseball season =

73rd annual season of Nippon Professional Baseball

2022 NPB season
- League: Nippon Professional Baseball
- Sport: Baseball
- Duration: March 25 – October 30
- Games: 143
- Teams: 12

Central League pennant
- League champions: Tokyo Yakult Swallows
- Runners-up: Yokohama DeNA BayStars
- Season MVP: Munetaka Murakami (Yakult)

Pacific League pennant
- League champions: Orix Buffaloes
- Runners-up: Fukuoka SoftBank Hawks
- Season MVP: Yoshinobu Yamamoto (Orix)

Climax Series
- CL champions: Tokyo Yakult Swallows
- CL runners-up: Hanshin Tigers
- PL champions: Orix Buffaloes
- PL runners-up: Fukuoka SoftBank Hawks

Japan Series
- Venue: Kyocera Dome Osaka, Nishi-ku, Osaka; Meiji Jingu Stadium, Shinjuku, Tokyo
- Champions: Orix Buffaloes
- Runners-up: Tokyo Yakult Swallows
- Finals MVP: Yutaro Sugimoto (Orix)

NPB seasons
- ← 2021 2023 →

The 2022 Nippon Professional Baseball season was the 73rd season of professional baseball in Japan since Nippon Professional Baseball (NPB) was reorganized in 1950. There are 12 NPB teams, split evenly between the Central League and Pacific League.

On April 10, Chiba Lotte Marines pitcher Rōki Sasaki threw a perfect game, the first in 28 years and the 16th in NPB history. Sasaki tied an existing NPB record by striking out 19 batters, and set a new record by striking out 13 consecutive batters.

Including Sasaki's perfect game, for the first time since 1940, there were five no-hitters this season, with Nao Higashihama of the Fukuoka SoftBank Hawks throwing one on May 11 against the Saitama Seibu Lions, Shōta Imanaga of the Yokohama DeNA BayStars doing so on June 7 during interleague play against the Hokkaido Nippon-Ham Fighters (also being the first no hitter in the history of the Sapporo Dome in its final season as the home of the Fighters), and Yoshinobu Yamamoto of the Orix Buffaloes throwing one also against the Lions on June 18. One was nearly thrown on July 20, with rookie Ren Mukunoki of the Buffaloes nearly doing so against the Fighters, but he fell 1 strike short, as he gave up a hit to Fighters infielder Ryusei Satoh, in which fans called as a similar incident to former MLB pitcher Dave Stieb, in which he lost a perfect game and a no hitter in the same game with only 1 strike to go. A 5th one would eventually be thrown on August 27 by Cody Ponce of the Hokkaido Nippon-Ham Fighters against the Fukuoka SoftBank Hawks, in just his 2nd start, tying 2022 with 1940 with the most no-hitters in a season in Japanese pro baseball history, as well as becoming the first foreign player since Rick Guttormson of the Tokyo Yakult Swallows in 2006 to throw a no-hitter, and the first Pacific League foreign player to do so since the now late Narciso Elvira did so with the Osaka Kintetsu Buffaloes in 2000.

The Tokyo Yakult Swallows took home the Central League pennant for the second year in a row over the Yokohama DeNA BayStars while the Orix Buffaloes took the Pacific League pennant over the Fukuoka SoftBank Hawks via the first pennant tiebreaker in NPB history.

== Regular season standings ==
Central League regular season standings
Rank	Team	G	W	L	T	Pct.	GB
1	Tokyo Yakult Swallows	143	80	59	4	.576	—
2	Yokohama DeNA BayStars	143	73	68	2	.518	8
3	Hanshin Tigers	143	68	71	4	.489	12
4	Yomiuri Giants	143	68	72	3	.486	12½
5	Hiroshima Toyo Carp	143	66	74	3	.471	14½
6	Chunichi Dragons	143	66	75	2	.468	15

Pacific League regular season standings
Rank	Team	G	W	L	T	Pct.	GB
1	Orix Buffaloes	143	76	65	2	.539	—
2	Fukuoka SoftBank Hawks	143	76	65	2	.539	—
3	Saitama Seibu Lions	143	72	68	3	.514	3½
4	Tohoku Rakuten Golden Eagles	143	69	71	3	.493	6½
5	Chiba Lotte Marines	143	69	73	1	.486	7½
6	Hokkaido Nippon-Ham Fighters	143	59	81	3	.421	16½

=== Interleague ===
Regular season interleague standings
Team	G	W	L	T	Win%	GB	Home	Away
Tokyo Yakult Swallows	18	14	4	0	.778	—	7–2	7–2
Hanshin Tigers	18	12	6	0	.667	2	6–3	6–3
Chiba Lotte Marines	18	10	8	0	.556	4	6–3	4–5
Fukuoka SoftBank Hawks	18	9	9	0	.500	5	5–4	4–5
Saitama Seibu Lions	18	9	9	0	.500	5	6–3	3–6
Yokohama DeNA BayStars	18	9	9	0	.500	5	5–4	4–5
Tohoku Rakuten Golden Eagles	18	9	9	0	.500	5	5–4	4–5
Hokkaido Nippon-Ham Fighters	18	8	10	0	.444	6	6–3	2–7
Orix Buffaloes	18	8	10	0	.444	6	2–7	6–3
Yomiuri Giants	18	8	10	0	.444	6	5–4	3–6
Chunichi Dragons	18	7	11	0	.389	7	5–4	2–7
Hiroshima Toyo Carp	18	5	13	0	.279	9	3–6	2–7

== Climax Series ==
First stage
Central League
2	Yokohama DeNA BayStars	1
3	Hanshin Tigers	2
Pacific League
2	Fukuoka SoftBank Hawks	2
3	Saitama Seibu Lions	0

Final stage
1	Tokyo Yakult Swallows	4
3	Hanshin Tigers	0
1	Orix Buffaloes	4
2	Fukuoka SoftBank Hawks	1

Japan Series
CL1	Tokyo Yakult Swallows	2
PL1	Orix Buffaloes	4

=== First stage ===
==== Central League ====
Hanshin Tigers won the series, 2–1.

Game	Date	Score	Location	Time	Attendance
1	October 8	Yokohama DeNA BayStars − 0, Hanshin Tigers − 2	Yokohama Stadium	3:34	33,033
2	October 9	Yokohama DeNA BayStars − 1, Hanshin Tigers − 0	Yokohama Stadium	2:48	33,037
3	October 10	Yokohama DeNA BayStars − 2, Hanshin Tigers − 3	Yokohama Stadium	3:19	32,977

==== Pacific League ====
Fukuoka SoftBank Hawks won the series, 2–0.

Game	Date	Score	Location	Time	Attendance
1	October 8	Fukuoka SoftBank Hawks − 5, Saitama Seibu Lions − 3	Fukuoka PayPay Dome	3:01	32,134
2	October 9	Fukuoka SoftBank Hawks − 8, Saitama Seibu Lions − 2	Fukuoka PayPay Dome	3:07	39,354

=== Final stage ===
The series started with a 1–0 advantage for the first-placed team.

==== Central League ====
Tokyo Yakult Swallows won the series, 4−0.

Game	Date	Score	Location	Time	Attendance
1	October 12	Tokyo Yakult Swallows − 7, Hanshin Tigers − 1	Meiji Jingu Stadium	3:03	26,499
2	October 13	Tokyo Yakult Swallows − 5, Hanshin Tigers − 3	Meiji Jingu Stadium	3:49	26,071
3	October 14	Tokyo Yakult Swallows − 6, Hanshin Tigers − 3	Meiji Jingu Stadium	3:39	29,343

==== Pacific League ====
Orix Buffaloes won the series, 4−1.

Game	Date	Score	Location	Time	Attendance
1	October 12	Orix Buffaloes − 5, Fukuoka SoftBank Hawks − 0	Kyocera Dome Osaka	3:08	24,509
2	October 13	Orix Buffaloes − 4, Fukuoka SoftBank Hawks − 3	Kyocera Dome Osaka	3:27	18,572
3	October 14	Orix Buffaloes − 0, Fukuoka SoftBank Hawks − 3	Kyocera Dome Osaka	3:05	27,526
4	October 15	Orix Buffaloes − 3, Fukuoka SoftBank Hawks − 2	Kyocera Dome Osaka	3:12	33,717

== Japan Series ==
Orix Buffaloes won the series, 4–2–1.

Game	Date	Score	Location	Time	Attendance
1	October 22	Tokyo Yakult Swallows – 5, Orix Buffaloes – 3	Meiji Jingu Stadium	3:48	29,402
2	October 23	Tokyo Yakult Swallows – 3, Orix Buffaloes – 3 (12)	Meiji Jingu Stadium	5:03	29,410
3	October 25	Orix Buffaloes – 1, Tokyo Yakult Swallows – 7	Kyocera Dome Osaka	3:28	33,098
4	October 26	Orix Buffaloes – 1, Tokyo Yakult Swallows – 0	Kyocera Dome Osaka	3:28	33,210
5	October 27	Orix Buffaloes − 6, Tokyo Yakult Swallows − 4	Kyocera Dome Osaka	3:40	33,135
6	October 29	Tokyo Yakult Swallows – 0, Orix Buffaloes – 3	Meiji Jingu Stadium	3:11	29,379
7	October 30	Tokyo Yakult Swallows- 4, Orix Buffaloes – 5	Meiji Jingu Stadium	3:12	29,381

== 2022 NPB attendance ==
#	Football club	Average attendance
1	Hanshin Tigers	36,370
2	Yomiuri Giants	32,199
3	Fukuoka SoftBank Hawks	31,221
4	Hiroshima Toyo Carp	27,732
5	Chunichi Dragons	25,459
6	Yokohama DeNA BayStars	24,708
7	Tokyo Yakult Swallows	22,741
8	Chiba Lotte Marines	20,685
9	ORIX Buffaloes	19,896
10	Tohoku Rakuten Golden Eagles	18,748
11	Hokkaido Nippon-Ham Fighters	17,937
12	Saitama Seibu Lions	16,837

== See also ==
- 2022 in baseball
- 2022 Major League Baseball season
- 2022 KBO League season
- 2022 Chinese Professional Baseball League season
