= Roki Sasaki's perfect game =

2022 baseball game of Japanese professional baseball

2022 Roki Sasaki's perfect game
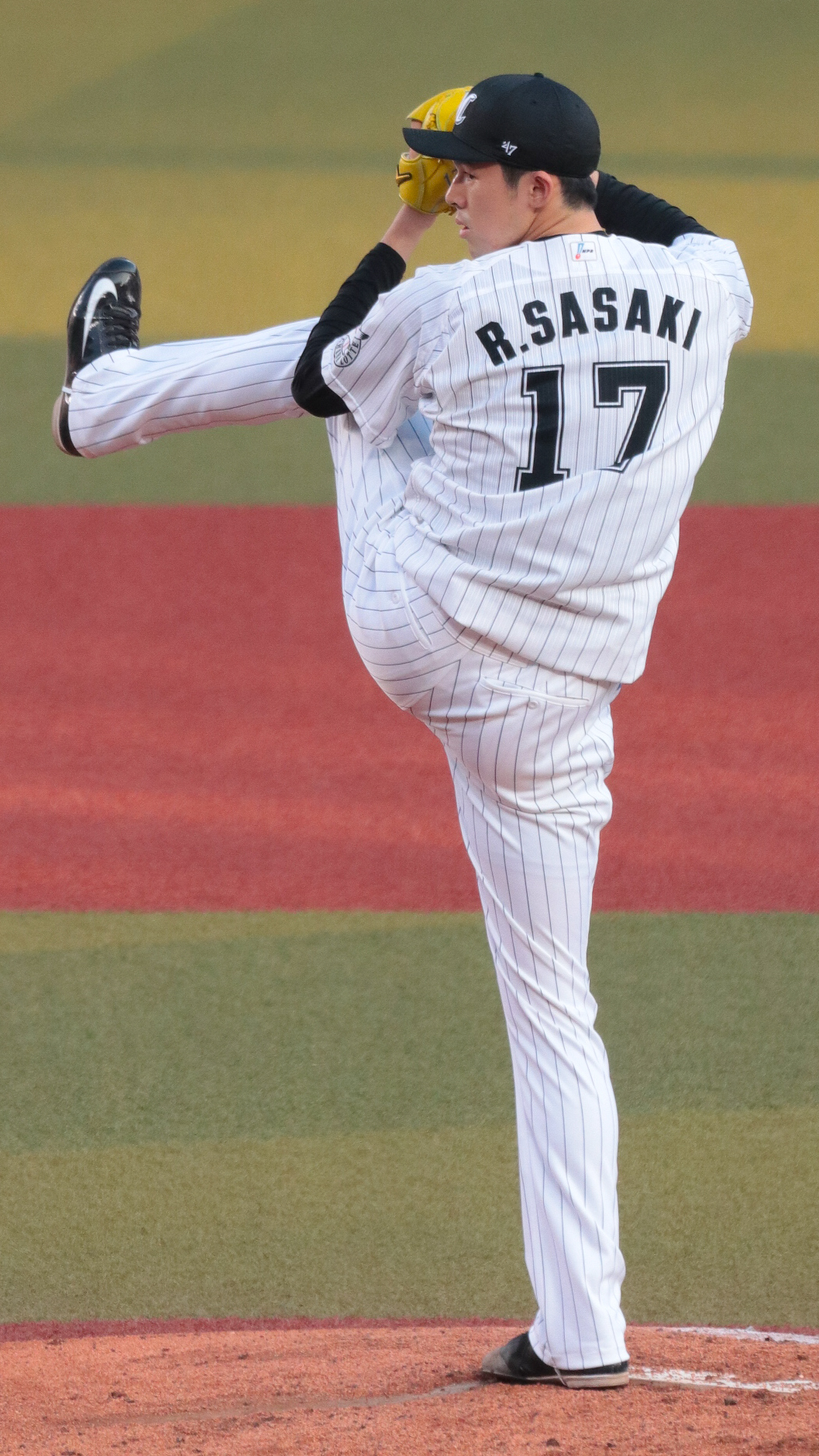
- Roki Sasaki pitching for the Chiba Lotte Marines
Orix Buffaloes	Chiba Lotte Marines
0	6
	1	2	3	4	5	6	7	8	9	R	H	E
Orix Buffaloes	0	0	0	0	0	0	0	0	0	0	0	0
Chiba Lotte Marines	1	0	0	0	0	5	0	0	X	6	9	0
- Date: April 10, 2022
- Venue: Zozo Marine Stadium
- City: Chiba, Chiba Prefecture
- Managers: Satoshi Nakajima (Orix Buffaloes); Tadahito Iguchi (Chiba Lotte Marines)
- Umpires: HP: Atsushi Kittaka; 1B: Tarō Murayama; 2B: Atsushi Fukaya; 3B: Kinji Nishimoto
- Attendance: 22,431
- Time of game: 2 hours and 30 minutes

On April 10, 2022, Roki Sasaki of the Chiba Lotte Marines of Nippon Professional Baseball's (NPB) Pacific League threw a perfect game against the Orix Buffaloes at Zozo Marine Stadium in Chiba City. It was the 17th perfect game in NPB history, as recognised by international standards (the 2007 Japan Series Game 5 perfect game, the 16th in NPB history, is not recognised by NPB because it was a combined perfect game, but is internationally recognised as a perfect game). Sasaki tied a NPB single-game record with 19 strikeouts and set an NPB record with 13 consecutive strikeouts.

== Background ==
Rōki Sasaki set a Japanese high school record when he threw a fastball at 163 kilometres per hour (101 mph), breaking the record set by Shohei Ohtani, who had achieved 160 kilometres per hour (99 mph). The Chiba Lotte Marines of Nippon Professional Baseball (NPB) selected Sasaki with the first overall pick in the 2019 NPB draft. Lotte had him train in bullpen sessions exclusively during the 2020 season to prevent injury. He made his NPB debut in 2021.

== Game synopsis ==
The Marines played a home game against the Orix Buffaloes at Zozo Marine Stadium on April 10, 2022. Sasaki started for Lotte while Hiroya Miyagi, the Pacific League Rookie of the Year for 2021, started for Orix. The first two batters Sasaki faced grounded out. He completed the top of the first inning by recording a strikeout of Masataka Yoshida, who led the Pacific League in batting during the 2021 season. Lotte scored a run off of Miyagi in the bottom of the first inning with two singles followed by a run batted in (RBI) groundout.

Sasaki then continued to strike out batters, striking out all three batters faced in the second, third, and fourth innings, setting a new NPB record with his tenth consecutive strikeout, also of Yoshida, in the fourth inning. The previous record had been set by Takao Kajimoto of the Hankyu Braves in 1957 and tied by Masayuki Dobashi of the Toei Flyers in 1958. Sasaki struck out the side in the top of the fifth inning, reaching 13 consecutive strikeouts. This also became a new world record, surpassing the 10 consecutive strikeouts achieved in Major League Baseball (MLB) by Corbin Burnes, Tom Seaver, and Aaron Nola. In the bottom of the sixth inning, Lotte scored five runs when Shogo Nakamura was hit by a pitch, followed by an RBI double by Brandon Laird, an RBI single by Adeiny Hechavarria, and a three RBI double by Kō Matsukawa, Lotte's 18-year-old catcher.

Sasaki finished the game with a strikeout of pinch hitter Yutaro Sugimoto, who led the Pacific League in home runs in 2021. Sugimoto's strikeout was the final out of the game and Sasaki's 19th strikeout, tying the NPB record set by Koji Noda of the Orix BlueWave in 1995. Sasaki completed the game with 105 pitches thrown. It was the first perfect game in NPB since November 1, 2007 (Game 5 of the 2007 Japan Series, a combined perfect game not recognised by NPB but is recognised globally as a no-hitter), as well as the 97th no-hitter in NPB and its predecessors (Note: The perfect game and no-hitter marks are based on internationally recognised standards, where combined no-hitters and no-hitters where the team without a hit scores a run with runners advancing by walks, errors, interference, while scoring on ground outs, sacrifice flies, and errors, neither of which count by NPB standards, but recognised by MLB and WBSC standards, are counted.), the first since August 15, 2020. Yoshida struck out three times against Sasaki, despite striking out just 26 times during the 2021 season, the lowest for all hitters.

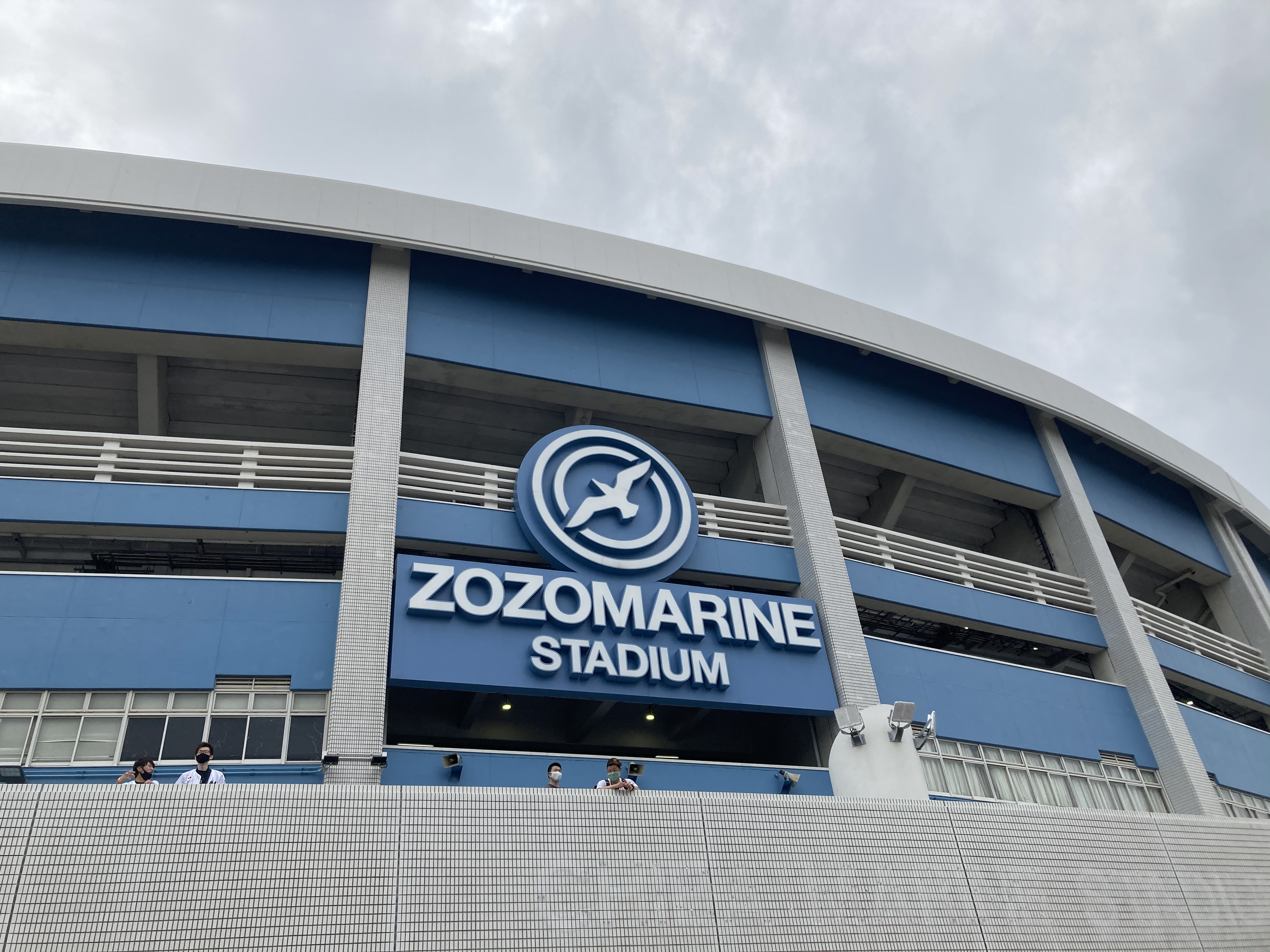

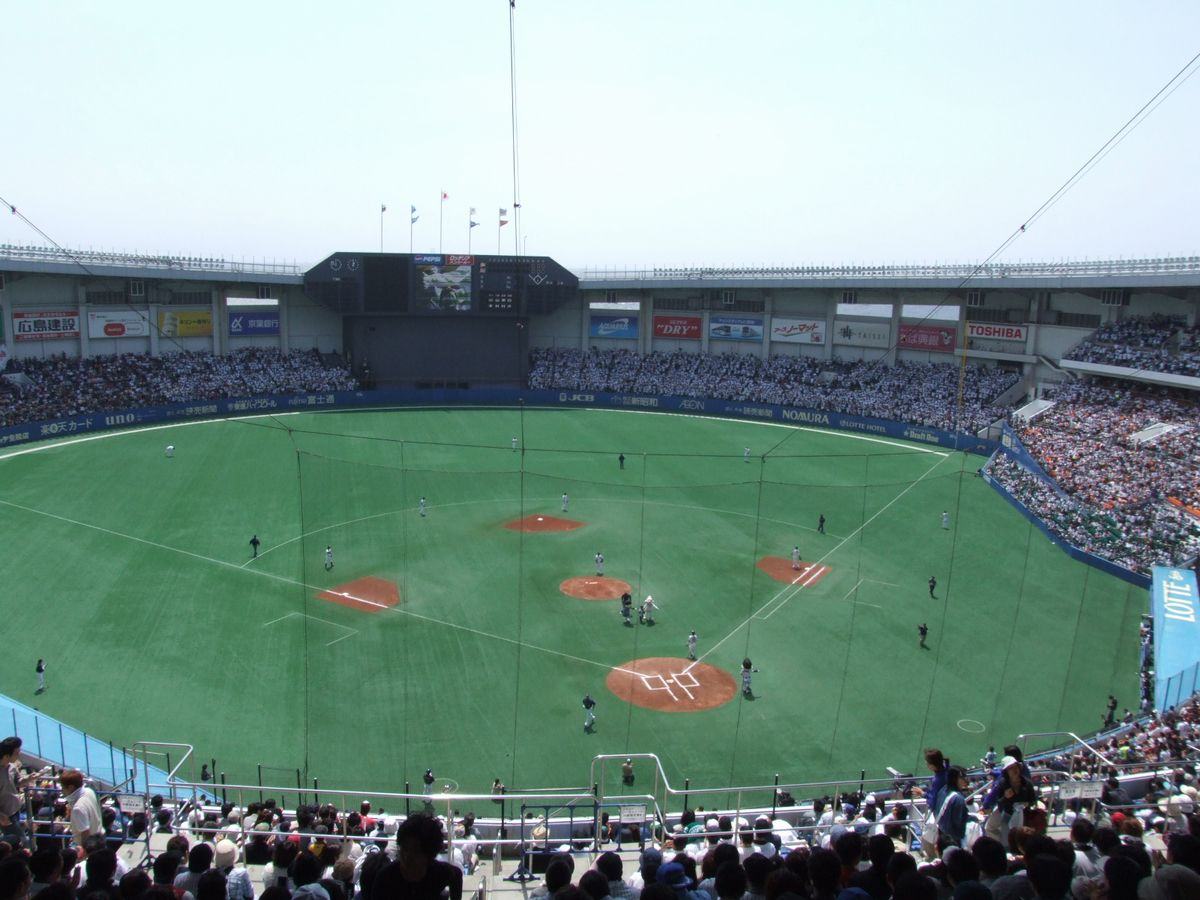
Zozo Marine Stadium, Chiba

At the age of 20 years and five months, Sasaki became the youngest NPB pitcher to throw a perfect game. He threw his fastball at 164 kilometres per hour (102 mph), matching his personal best. Sasaki compiled a game score of 106, surpassing the 105 for Kerry Wood's 20 strikeout game from the 1998 Major League Baseball season, which was the highest MLB game score since the end of the baseball color line.

As a result of this game, the Marines improved to 7–6 and the Buffaloes fell to 6–9 on the season. The Marines would finish fifth in 2022, going 69–73–1 while the Buffaloes would rally past this defeat to win the Pacific League pennant on a tiebreaker with the Fukuoka SoftBank Hawks, going 76–65–2, and would eventually win the 2022 Japan Series over the Tokyo Yakult Swallows.

=== Line score ===
April 10, 2022 at Zozo Marine Stadium, Chiba City, Chiba Prefecture
Team	1	2	3	4	5	6	7	8	9	R	H	E
Orix	0	0	0	0	0	0	0	0	0	0	0	0
Lotte	1	0	0	0	0	5	0	0	X	6	9	0
WP: Roki Sasaki (2–0) LP: Hiroya Miyagi (0–2); Attendance: 22,431; Boxscore

=== Box score ===
Orix Buffaloes
Batter	AB	H	RBI	BB	HP	SO
Shunta Gotoh, RF	3	0	0	0	0	1
Breyvic Valera, 3B	3	0	0	0	0	1
Masataka Yoshida, DH	3	0	0	0	0	3
Rangel Ravelo, 1B	3	0	0	0	0	3
Shuhei Fukuda, CF-LF	3	0	0	0	0	3
Ryo Nishimura, LF	2	0	0	0	0	2
Haruto Watanabe, CF	1	0	0	0	0	1
Kotaro Kurebayashi, SS	2	0	0	0	0	1
Keita Nakagawa, PH	1	0	0	0	0	0
Sho Fukunaga, C	2	0	0	0	0	1
Masato Matsui, C	0	0	0	0	0	0
Tatsuya Yamaashi, PH	1	0	0	0	0	0
Sho Gibo, 2B	2	0	0	0	0	2
Yutaro Sugimoto, PH	1	0	0	0	0	1

Pitcher	IP	BF	H	BB	HB	SO	ER
Hiroya Miyagi	5 2/3	27	8	1	1	6	6
Ryōta Muranishi	1/3	1	0	0	0	1	0
Shota Abe	1	3	0	0	0	0	0
Hitomi Honda	1	4	1	0	0	2	0

Chiba Lotte Marines
Batter	AB	H	RBI	BB	HP	SO
Akito Takabe, LF	4	1	0	0	0	1
Hiromi Oka, LF	0	0	0	0	0	0
Kyōta Fujiwara, CF	4	1	0	0	0	0
Shogo Nakamura, 2B	3	1	0	0	1	0
Brandon Laird, DH	4	1	2	0	0	0
Leonys Martín, RF	4	1	0	0	0	2
Koshiro Wada, PR-RF	0	0	0	0	0	0
Toshiya Satoh, 1B	4	1	0	0	0	2
Adeiny Hechavarria, 3B	4	2	1	0	0	2
Yudai Fujioka, SS	2	0	0	1	0	1
Kō Matsukawa, C	3	1	3	0	0	1

Pitcher	IP	BF	H	BB	HB	SO	ER
Rōki Sasaki	9	27	0	0	0	19	0

== Aftermath ==
In his next start, on April 17, Sasaki pitched eight perfect innings against the Hokkaido Nippon-Ham Fighters, before manager Tadahito Iguchi took him out of the game before the ninth inning. Had he completed the perfect game, he would have become only the second person in professional baseball history to throw two perfect games and would have become the first man to do so in consecutive starts. He recorded 14 strikeouts on 102 pitches, including striking out the side in the eighth inning with a 101-mph fastball. Sasaki finished the game having retired 52 consecutive batters, setting an NPB record. The MLB record for retiring consecutive batters is 46 by Yusmeiro Petit. Sasaki's streak ended in his next game, on April 24, after he allowed a hit on the first pitch that he threw.

A ball from the game autographed by Sasaki was donated to the National Baseball Hall of Fame and Museum in Cooperstown, New York.

The Orix Buffaloes would go on to win their first Japan Series title since 1996 (as the Orix BlueWave), while Sasaki's Marines would miss the playoffs for the first time since 2019.

== See also ==
- List of Nippon Professional Baseball perfect games
