= 2022 Pacific League Climax Series =

Japanese baseball series

First stage
Team (Wins)		Manager	Season
Fukuoka SoftBank Hawks (2)		Hiroshi Fujimoto	76–65–2 (.539), 0 GB
Saitama Seibu Lions (0)		Hatsuhiko Tsuji	72–68–3 (.514), 3½ GB
- Dates: October 8–9
- Television: Sports Live+ (CS); TV Asahi (BS, Game 1); NHK (BS, Game 2)
- Radio: KBC; RKB

Final stage
Team (Wins)		Manager	Season
Orix Buffaloes (4)		Satoshi Nakajima	76–65–2 (.539), 0 GA
Fukuoka SoftBank Hawks (1)		Hiroshi Fujimoto	76–65–2 (.539), 0 GB
- Dates: October 12–15
- MVP: Masataka Yoshida (Orix)
- Television: JSports 3 (CS); NHK (BS)
- Radio: KBC; NHK Radio 1 (Game 1); RKB

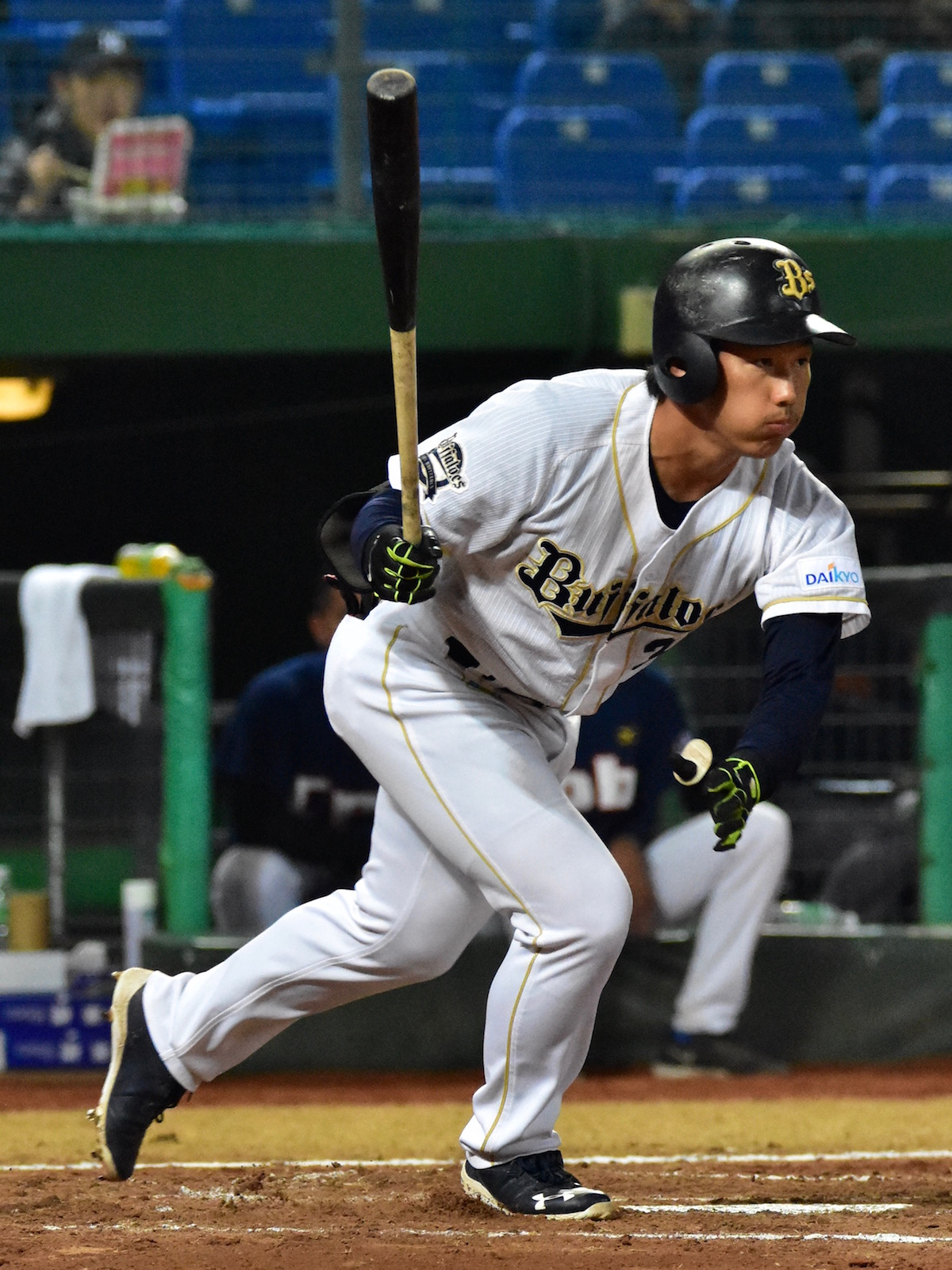

The 2022 Pacific League Climax Series (PLCS) was a set of two consecutive playoff series in Nippon Professional Baseball (NPB). The first stage began on October 8 and the final stage concluded on October 15. The first stage was a best-of-three series between the second-place Fukuoka SoftBank Hawks and the third-place Saitama Seibu Lions. The final stage was a best-of-six with the Orix Buffaloes, the Pacific League champion, being awarded a one-win advantage against the Hawks, the winner of the first stage. The Buffaloes advanced to the 2022 Japan Series to compete against the Tokyo Yakult Swallows, the 2022 Central League Climax Series winner.

The first stage in Fukuoka marked the final games for Hatsuhiko Tsuji as a manager, as he would step down and be replaced by former Lions shortstop Kazuo Matsui.

== First stage ==
=== Summary ===
SoftBank won the series, 2–0.

Game	Date	Score	Location	Time	Attendance
1	October 8	Saitama Seibu Lions – 3, Fukuoka SoftBank Hawks – 5	PayPay Dome	3:01	32,134
2	October 9	Saitama Seibu Lions – 2, Fukuoka SoftBank Hawks – 8	PayPay Dome	3:07	39,354

=== Game 1 ===
Saturday, October 8, 2022, 2:00 pm (JST) at Fukuoka PayPay Dome in Fukuoka, Fukuoka Prefecture
Team	1	2	3	4	5	6	7	8	9	R	H	E
Seibu	0	0	0	0	2	1	0	0	0	3	6	2
SoftBank	0	0	4	0	0	1	0	0	X	5	7	1
WP: Kodai Senga (1–0) LP: Kona Takahashi (0–1) Sv: Liván Moinelo (1); Home runs: SEI: Tomoya Mori (1); SBH: Yuki Yanagita (1); Attendance: 32,134; Boxscore

=== Game 2 ===
Sunday, October 9, 2022, 2:00 pm (JST) at Fukuoka PayPay Dome in Fukuoka, Fukuoka Prefecture
Team	1	2	3	4	5	6	7	8	9	R	H	E
Seibu	0	0	0	0	1	0	0	0	1	2	6	0
SoftBank	0	0	4	1	0	0	2	1	X	8	11	1
WP: Nao Higashihama (1–0) LP: Tatsuya Imai (0–1); Home runs: SEI: Hotaka Yamakawa (1); SBH: Yuki Yanagita (2); Attendance: 39,354; Boxscore

== Final stage ==
=== Summary ===
Orix won the series, 4–1*.

Game	Date	Score	Location	Time	Attendance
1	October 12	Fukuoka SoftBank Hawks – 0, Orix Buffaloes – 5	Kyocera Dome	3:08	24,509
2	October 13	Fukuoka SoftBank Hawks – 3, Orix Buffaloes – 4	Kyocera Dome	3:27	18,572
3	October 14	Fukuoka SoftBank Hawks – 3, Orix Buffaloes – 0	Kyocera Dome	3:05	27,526
4	October 15	Fukuoka SoftBank Hawks – 2, Orix Buffaloes – 3	Kyocera Dome	3:12	33,717

* The Pacific League regular season champion is given a one-game advantage in the final stage.

=== Game 1 ===
Wednesday, October 12, 2022, 6:02 pm (JST) at Kyocera Dome in Osaka, Osaka Prefecture
Team	1	2	3	4	5	6	7	8	9	R	H	E
SoftBank	0	0	0	0	0	0	0	0	0	0	6	0
Orix	0	0	0	1	3	0	1	0	X	5	8	0
WP: Yoshinobu Yamamoto (1–0) LP: Shuta Ishikawa (0–1); Home runs: SBH: None; ORX: Masataka Yoshida (1); Attendance: 24,509; Boxscore

=== Game 2 ===
Thursday, October 13, 2022, 6:02 pm (JST) at Kyocera Dome in Osaka, Osaka Prefecture
Team	1	2	3	4	5	6	7	8	9	R	H	E
SoftBank	1	0	1	0	0	0	0	0	1	3	9	0
Orix	1	0	1	0	2	0	0	0	X	4	11	0
WP: Hiroya Miyagi (1–0) LP: Tomohisa Ohzeki (0–1) Sv: Shota Abe (1); Home runs: SBH: None; ORX: Yutaro Sugimoto (1); Attendance: 18,572; Boxscore

=== Game 3 ===
Friday, October 14, 2022, 6:01 pm (JST) at Kyocera Dome in Osaka, Osaka Prefecture
Team	1	2	3	4	5	6	7	8	9	R	H	E
SoftBank	2	0	0	0	0	0	0	1	0	3	8	1
Orix	0	0	0	0	3	0	0	0	0	0	6	1
WP: Kodai Senga (1–0) LP: Daiki Tajima (0–1) Sv: Liván Moinelo (1); Home runs: SBH: Isami Nomura (1); ORX: None; Attendance: 27,526; Boxscore

=== Game 4 ===
Saturday, October 15, 2022, 6:01 pm (JST) at Kyocera Dome in Osaka, Osaka Prefecture
Team	1	2	3	4	5	6	7	8	9	R	H	E
SoftBank	0	0	0	0	0	0	2	0	0	2	4	1
Orix	0	0	0	2	0	0	0	0	1X	3	6	0
WP: Shota Abe (1–0) LP: Liván Moinelo (0–1); Home runs: SBH: Alfredo Despaigne (1); ORX: Masataka Yoshida (2); Attendance: 33,717; Boxscore
