= 2022 Central League Climax Series =

First stage
Team (Wins)		Manager	Season
Hanshin Tigers (2)		Akihiro Yano	68–71–4 (.489), 12 GB
Yokohama DeNA BayStars (1)		Daisuke Miura	73–68–2 (.518), 8 GB
- Dates: October 8–10
- Television: TBS Channel 2 (CS/BS)
- Radio: Nippon Broadcasting System

Final stage
Team (Wins)		Manager	Season
Tokyo Yakult Swallows (4)		Shingo Takatsu	80–59–4 (.576), 8 GA
Hanshin Tigers (0)		Akihiro Yano	68–71–4 (.489), 12 GB
- Dates: October 12–14
- MVP: José Osuna (Yakult)
- Television: Fuji TV ONE; Fuji Network (BS, Game 1); TV Asahi (BS, Game 2)
- Radio: Nippon Broadcasting System

The 2022 Central League Climax Series (CLCS) was a set of two consecutive playoff series in Nippon Professional Baseball (NPB). The First Stage began on October 8 and the Final Stage concluded on October 14. The First Stage was a best-of-three series between the second-place Yokohama DeNA BayStars and the third-place Hanshin Tigers. The Final Series was a best-of-six with the Tokyo Yakult Swallows, the Central League champion, being awarded a one-win advantage against the Tigers, the winner of the First Stage. The Tokyo Yakult Swallows advanced to face the 2022 Pacific League Climax Series winner in the 2022 Japan Series with a 4-0 sweep of the Tigers.

== First stage ==
=== Summary ===
Hanshin won the series, 2–1.

Game	Date	Score	Location	Time	Attendance
1	October 8	Hanshin Tigers – 2, Yokohama DeNA BayStars – 0	Yokohama Stadium	3:34	33,033
2	October 9	Hanshin Tigers – 0, Yokohama DeNA BayStars – 1	Yokohama Stadium	2:48	33,037
3	October 10	Hanshin Tigers – 3, Yokohama DeNA BayStars – 2	Yokohama Stadium	3:19	32,977

=== Game 1 ===
Saturday, October 8, 2022, 2:01 pm (JST) at Yokohama Stadium in Yokohama, Kanagawa Prefecture
Team	1	2	3	4	5	6	7	8	9	R	H	E
Hanshin	0	0	0	0	2	0	0	0	0	2	9	1
DeNA	0	0	0	0	0	0	0	0	0	0	6	0
WP: Koyo Aoyagi (1–0) LP: Shota Imanaga (0–1) Sv: Atsuki Yuasa (1); Attendance: 33,033; Boxscore

=== Game 2 ===
Sunday, October 9, 2022, 2:01 pm (JST) at Yokohama Stadium in Yokohama, Kanagawa Prefecture
Team	1	2	3	4	5	6	7	8	9	R	H	E
Hanshin	0	0	0	0	0	0	0	0	0	0	2	0
DeNA	0	0	0	0	1	0	0	0	X	1	5	0
WP: Shinichi Ohnuki (1–0) LP: Masashi Ito (0–1) Sv: Yasuaki Yamasaki (1); Attendance: 33,037; Boxscore

=== Game 3 ===
Monday, October 10, 2022, 2:00 pm (JST) at Yokohama Stadium in Yokohama, Kanagawa Prefecture
Team	1	2	3	4	5	6	7	8	9	R	H	E
Hanshin	0	0	0	1	0	2	0	0	0	3	6	2
DeNA	0	1	1	0	0	0	0	0	0	2	5	0
WP: Yuta Iwasada (1–0) LP: Haruhiro Hamaguchi (0–1) Sv: Atsuki Yuasa (2); Home runs: HAN: Teruaki Sato (1); YDB: Toshiro Miyazaki (1); Attendance: 32,977; Boxscore

== Final stage ==
=== Summary ===
Yakult won the series, 4–0*.

Game	Date	Score	Location	Time	Attendance
1	October 12	Hanshin Tigers – 1, Tokyo Yakult Swallows – 7	Meiji Jingu Stadium	3:03	26,499
2	October 13	Hanshin Tigers – 3, Tokyo Yakult Swallows – 5	Meiji Jingu Stadium	3:49	26,071
3	October 14	Hanshin Tigers – 3, Tokyo Yakult Swallows – 6	Meiji Jingu Stadium	3:39	29,343

* The Central League regular season champion is given a one-game advantage in the final stage.

=== Game 1 ===
Wednesday, October 12, 2022, 6:00 pm (JST) at Meiji Jingu Stadium in Shinjuku, Tokyo
Team	1	2	3	4	5	6	7	8	9	R	H	E
Hanshin	0	0	0	0	0	1	0	0	0	1	9	0
Yakult	3	1	1	0	0	2	0	0	X	7	7	0
WP: Yasuhiro Ogawa (1–0) LP: Yuki Nishi (0–1); Home runs: HAN: None; YAK: José Osuna (1), Domingo Santana (1); Attendance: 26,499; Boxscore

=== Game 2 ===
Thursday, October 13, 2022, 6:01 pm (JST) at Meiji Jingu Stadium in Shinjuku, Tokyo
Team	1	2	3	4	5	6	7	8	9	R	H	E
Hanshin	1	0	0	0	0	0	1	0	1	3	11	1
Yakult	0	0	2	1	2	0	0	0	X	5	7	1
WP: Cy Sneed (1–0) LP: Shintaro Fujinami (0–1) Sv: Scott McGough (1); Home runs: HAN: None; YAK: Munetaka Murakami (1), Hideki Nagaoka (1), José Osuna (2); Attendance: 26,071; Boxscore

=== Game 3 ===
Friday, October 14, 2022, 6:01 pm (JST) at Meiji Jingu Stadium in Shinjuku, Tokyo
Team	1	2	3	4	5	6	7	8	9	R	H	E
Hanshin	0	0	0	1	2	0	0	0	0	3	8	2
Yakult	0	0	0	0	0	0	5	1	X	6	5	0
WP: Kazuto Taguchi (1–0) LP: Koyo Aoyagi (0–1) Sv: Scott McGough (2); Attendance: 29,343; Boxscore
