= 2022 Japan Series =

Team (Wins)	Managers	Season
Orix Buffaloes (4)	Satoshi Nakajima	76–65–2 (.539), 0 GA
Tokyo Yakult Swallows (2)	Shingo Takatsu	80–59–4 (.576), 8 GA
- Dates: October 22–30
- MVP: Yutaro Sugimoto (Orix)
- FSA: José Osuna (Yakult)

Broadcast
- Television: Fuji TV (Games 1, 3, 5, 6, & 7); NHK-BS1 (Games 2, 3, 5, & 6); TV Asahi (Game 2); TBS (Game 4); TVer (All Games, live streaming)
- Radio: JOLF (All Games); NHK Radio 1 (All Games); JOQR (Games 1, 2, 6 & 7); MBS (Games 3, 4, & 5)

The 2022 Japan Series (known as the SMBC Nippon Series 2022 for sponsorship reasons) was the championship series of Nippon Professional Baseball for the 2022 season. The 73rd edition of the Japan Series, it was a best-of-seven playoff between the winning teams of the Pacific League and Central League's Climax Series. The series began on October 22 and ended on October 30.

The Tokyo Yakult Swallows advanced to the Japan Series from the 2022 Central League Climax Series. They faced the Orix Buffaloes, winners of the 2022 Pacific League Climax Series. This matchup was a rematch of the previous year's Japan Series, when Yakult won in six games.

In the 2022 series, Yakult won Games 1 and 3, while Game 2 ended in a twelve-inning tie. Orix then won the next four games to win the series, taking home the first Japan Series under the Buffaloes moniker in league history and Orix's first since 1996, when they were the Orix BlueWave. Yutaro Sugimoto won the Japan Series Most Valuable Player Award.

== Series overview ==
First Stage
Central League
2	Yokohama DeNA BayStars	1
3	Hanshin Tigers	2
Pacific League
2	Fukuoka SoftBank Hawks	2
3	Saitama Seibu Lions	0

Final Stage
1	Tokyo Yakult Swallows	4
3	Hanshin Tigers	0
1	Orix Buffaloes	4
2	Fukuoka SoftBank Hawks	1

Japan Series
CL1	Tokyo Yakult Swallows	2
PL1	Orix Buffaloes	4

2022 Japan Series managers

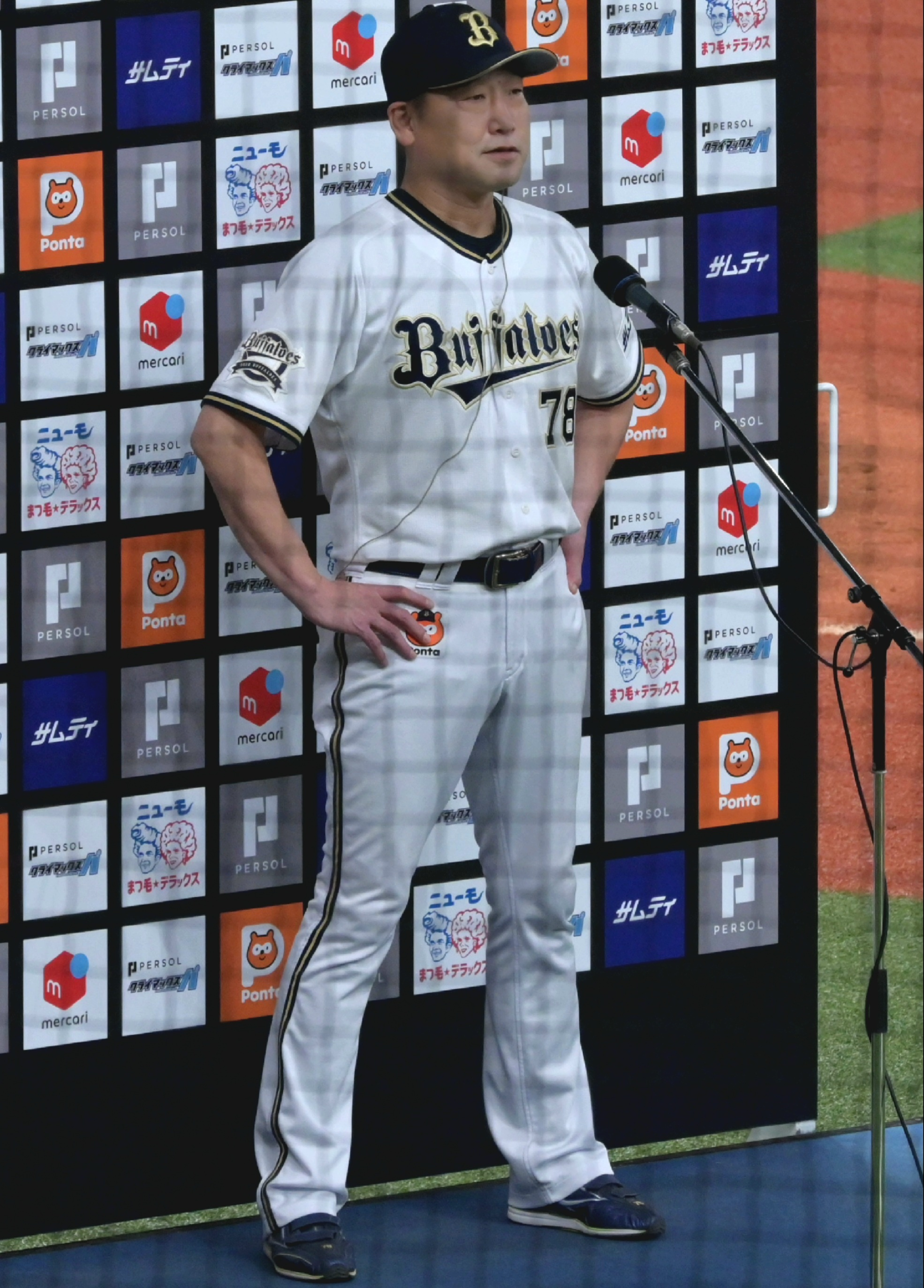
Satoshi Nakajima, Orix

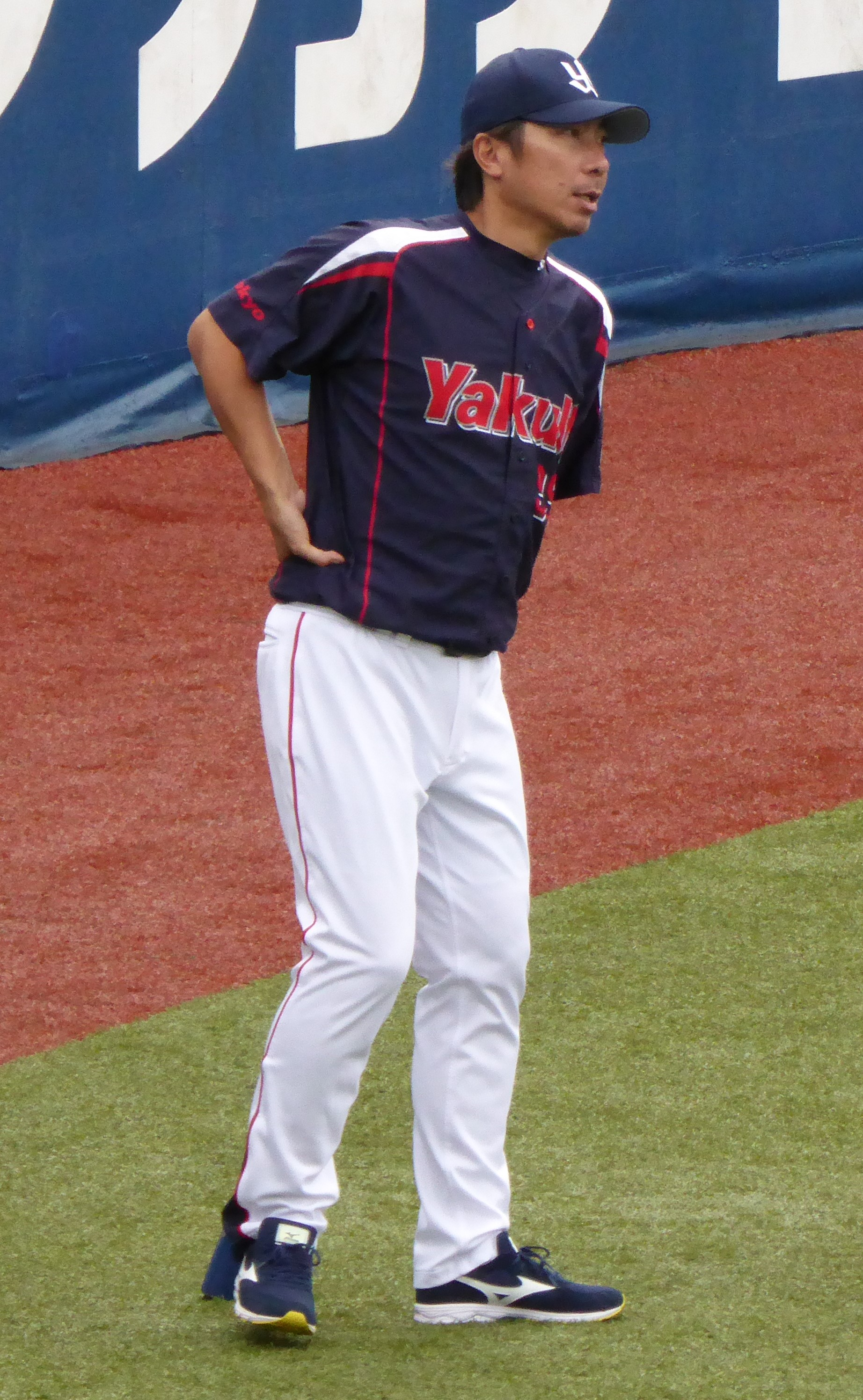
Shingo Takatsu, Yakult

The Orix Buffaloes finished the regular season in first place of the Pacific League, their second straight pennant and 14th overall, after a tiebreaker with the Fukuoka SoftBank Hawks; the Buffaloes finished with 15 wins head to head against the Hawks who finished with 10. The Buffaloes automatically advanced to the final stage of the Climax Series. They faced the Hawks and defeated them 4–1 in four games (as Orix had a one game advantage for finishing in first place).

The Tokyo Yakult Swallows finished the regular season in first place in the Central League to win their second straight pennant, and their ninth overall. They advanced directly to the final stage of the Climax Series, where they defeated the Hanshin Tigers in three games (with the one game advantage for finishing in first place).

The Buffaloes and Swallows faced each other in the 2021 Japan Series, with the Swallows winning in six games. It was Orix's first appearance in the championship round since they won the 1996 Japan Series. Many key players from the 2021 series returned to the 2022 series, including Swallows closer Scott McGough and outfielder José Osuna and Buffaloes outfielder Yutaro Sugimoto and ace pitcher Taisuke Yamaoka. Also, both of the reigning Nippon Professional Baseball Most Valuable Player Award winners appeared in the series: Yoshinobu Yamamoto of the Buffaloes was the most valuable player of the Pacific League in 2021, while Munetaka Murakami, who won the Triple Crown in 2022, won the 2021 Central League's most valuable player award. Yamamoto also won the Eiji Sawamura Award, given to the best pitcher in Nippon Professional Baseball, in 2021 and 2022.

== Summary ==
Orix won the series, 4–2–1.

Game	Date	Score	Location	Time	Attendance
1	October 22	Orix Buffaloes – 3, Tokyo Yakult Swallows – 5	Meiji Jingu Stadium	3:48	29,402
2	October 23	Orix Buffaloes – 3, Tokyo Yakult Swallows – 3 (12)	Meiji Jingu Stadium	5:03	29,410
3	October 25	Tokyo Yakult Swallows – 7, Orix Buffaloes – 1	Kyocera Dome Osaka	3:28	33,098
4	October 26	Tokyo Yakult Swallows – 0, Orix Buffaloes – 1	Kyocera Dome Osaka	3:28	33,210
5	October 27	Tokyo Yakult Swallows − 4, Orix Buffaloes − 6	Kyocera Dome Osaka	3:40	33,135
6	October 29	Orix Buffaloes − 3, Tokyo Yakult Swallows − 0	Meiji Jingu Stadium	3:11	29,379
7	October 30	Orix Buffaloes – 5, Tokyo Yakult Swallows – 4	Meiji Jingu Stadium	3:12	29,381

=== Game 1 ===
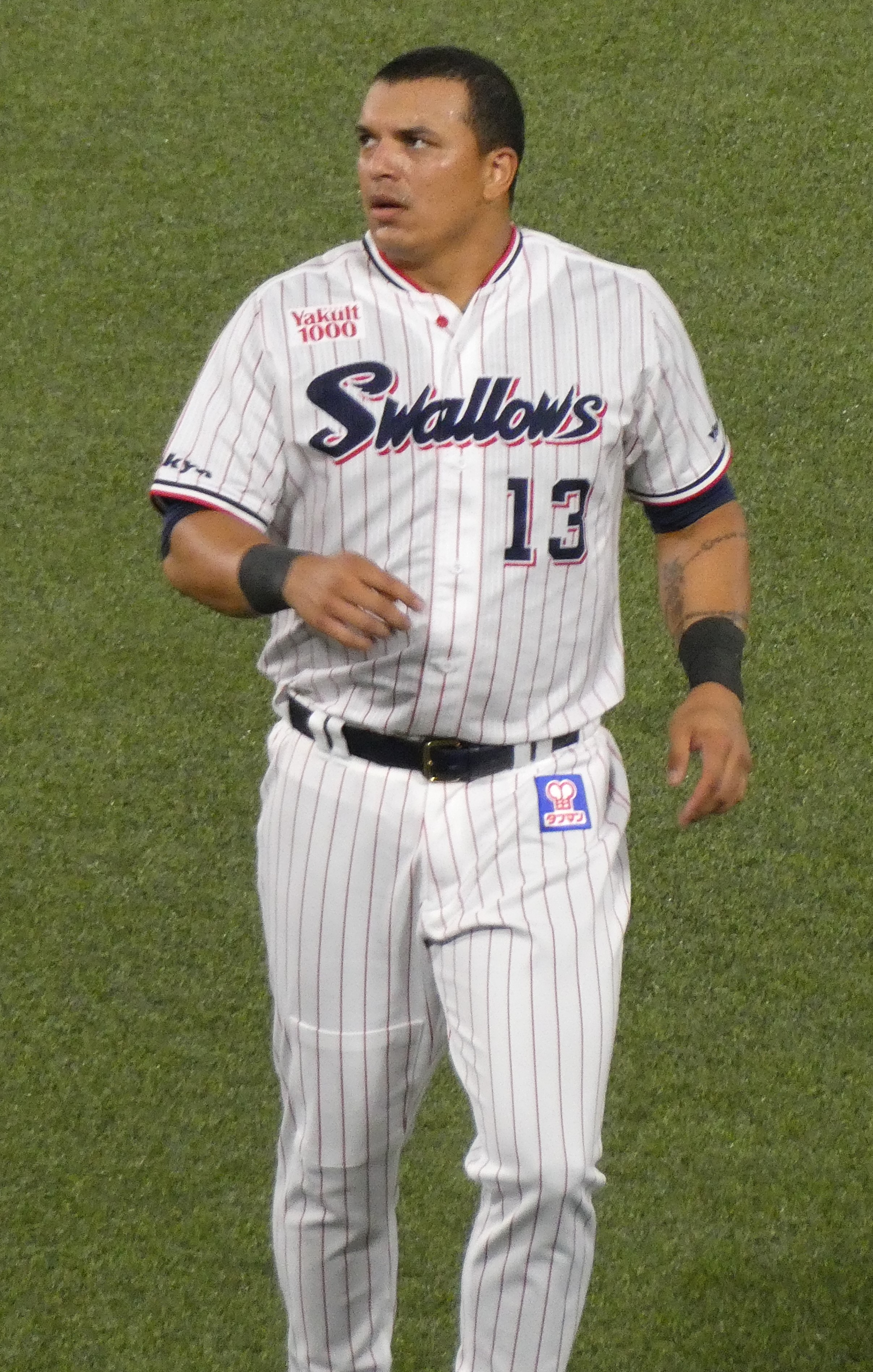
José Osuna had a home run and three runs batted in for Yakult in Game 1.

Saturday, October 22, 2022, 6:35 pm (JST) at Meiji Jingu Stadium in Shinjuku, Tokyo
Team	1	2	3	4	5	6	7	8	9	R	H	E
Orix	0	2	0	0	0	0	0	1	0	3	10	2
Yakult	2	0	1	1	0	0	0	1	X	5	10	0
WP: Yasuhiro Ogawa (1–0) LP: Yoshinobu Yamamoto (0–1) Sv: Scott McGough (1); Home runs: ORX: None; YAK: Yasutaka Shiomi (1), José Osuna (1), Munetaka Murakami (1); Attendance: 29,402; Boxscore

Yasuhiro Ogawa started Game 1 for Yakult while Yoshinobu Yamamoto started for Orix. In the bottom of the first inning, José Osuna recorded two runs batted in (RBIs) for the Swallows on a double that scored Yasutaka Shiomi and Munetaka Murakami. Orix tied the score in the second inning with an RBI single by Kotaro Kurebayashi and a bases loaded walk by Shuhei Fukuda, but Shiomi broke the tie with a home run in the third inning and Osuna hit a home run in the fourth inning. Yamamoto left the game in the fifth inning due to muscle cramp, after allowing four runs. Takahiro Okada had an RBI single for the Buffaloes in the top of the eighth inning, but Yakult scored a run in the bottom of the eighth inning.

=== Game 2 ===
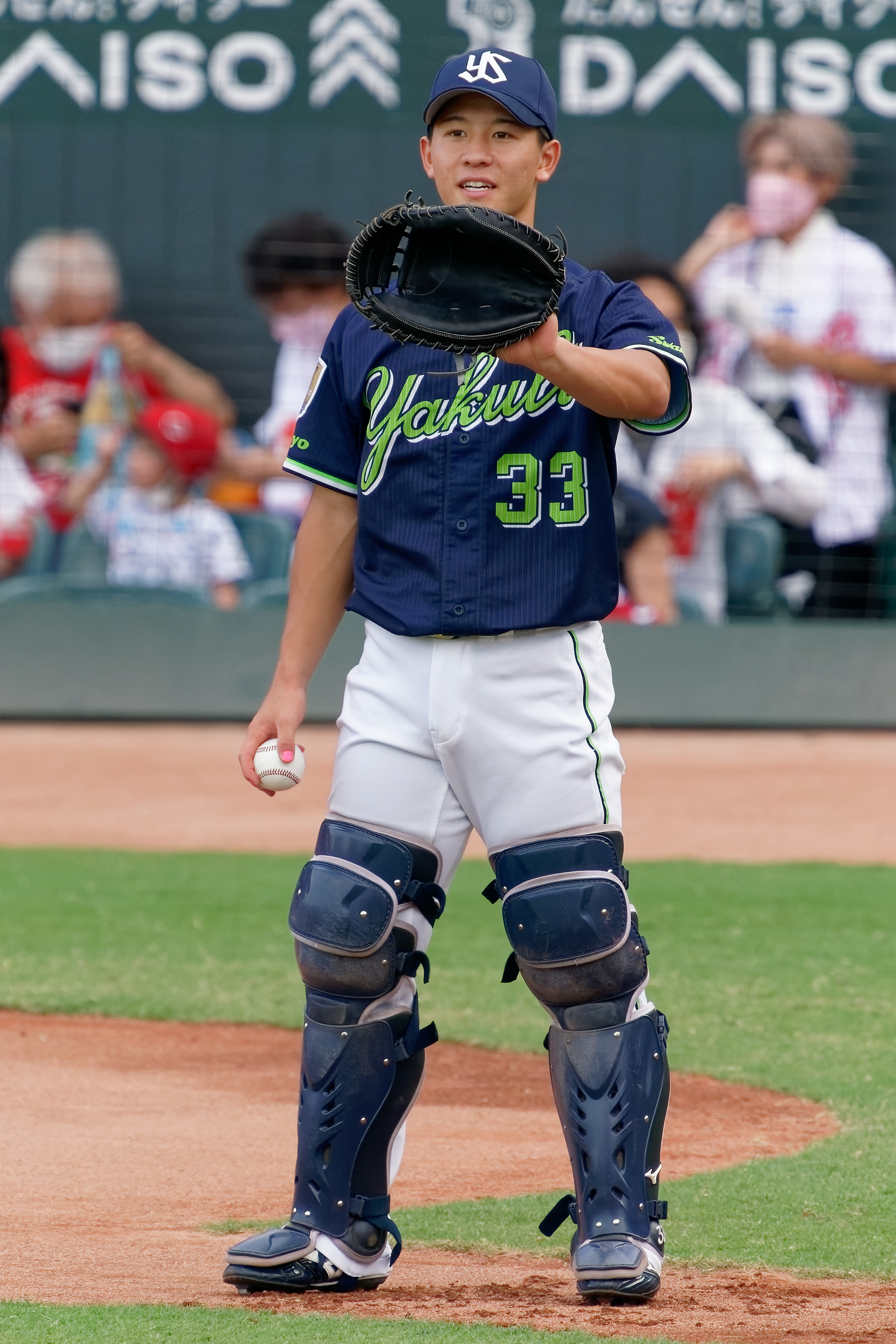
Sōma Uchiyama's pinch hit home run in the bottom of the ninth inning tied Game 2.

Sunday, October 23, 2022, 6:04 pm (JST) at Meiji Jingu Stadium in Shinjuku, Tokyo
Team	1	2	3	4	5	6	7	8	9	10	11	12	R	H	E
Orix	0	0	2	0	1	0	0	0	0	0	0	0	3	13	0
Yakult	0	0	0	0	0	0	0	0	3	0	0	0	3	12	1
Starting pitchers: ORX: Sachiya Yamasaki; YAK: Cy Sneed; Home runs: ORX: None; YAK: Sōma Uchiyama (1); Attendance: 29,410; Boxscore

Sachiya Yamasaki, Orix's starting pitcher for Game 2, recorded an RBI single off of Cy Sneed, Yakult's starting pitcher, in the third inning. The Buffaloes added a second run in the inning on an error by Domingo Santana, Yakult's right fielder. Yutaro Sugimoto hit an RBI infield single for Orix in the fifth inning to increase the lead to 3–0. Pinch hitting for the Swallows in the bottom of the ninth inning, Sōma Uchiyama hit a three-run home run off of Shota Abe, after a double by Takeshi Miyamoto and a walk issued to Yasutaka Shiomi, to tie the game. Neither team scored during extra innings, and the game ended in a tie after the 12th inning. It was the first tied Japan Series game since Game 1 of the 2018 Japan Series.

=== Game 3 ===
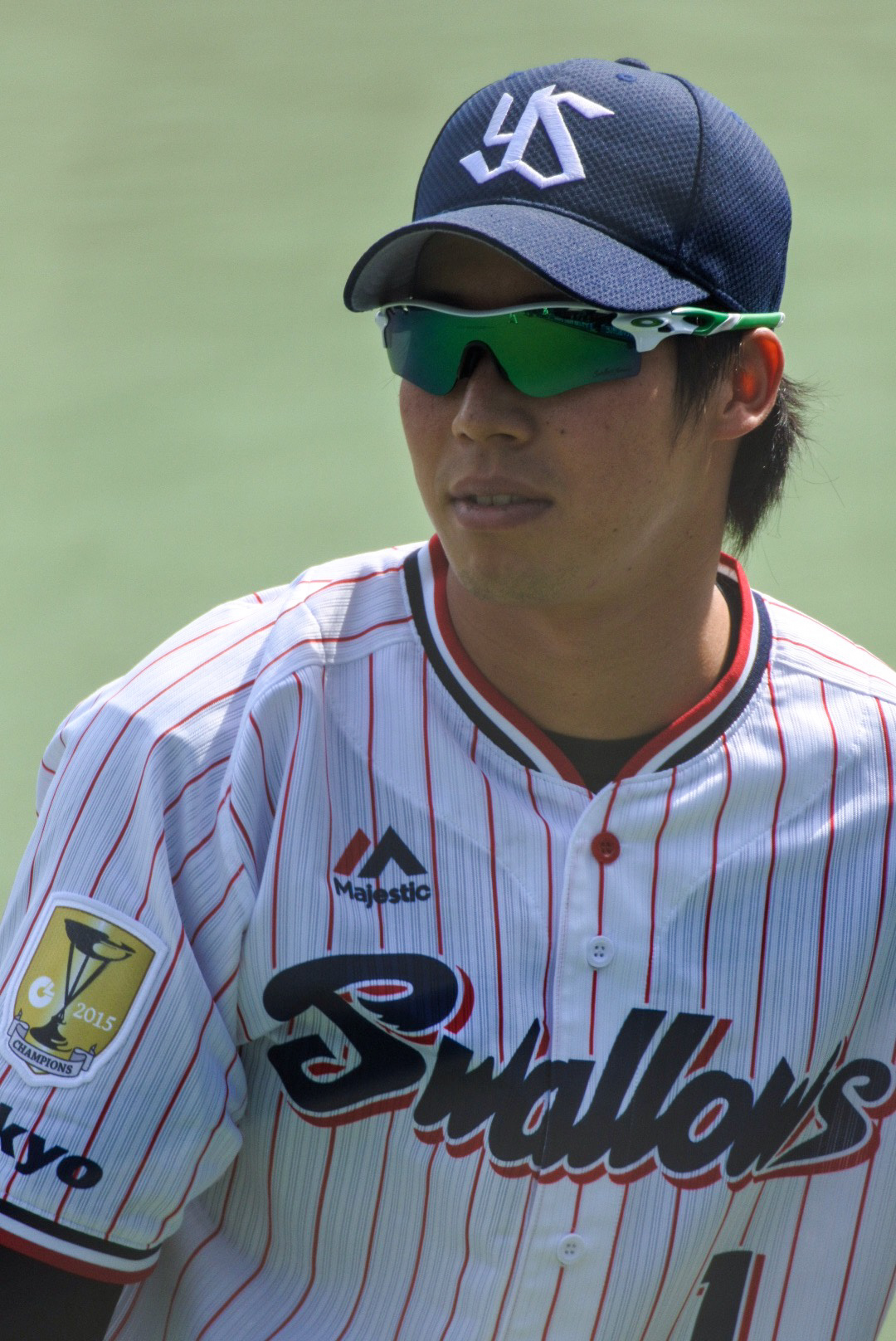
Tetsuto Yamada hit the go-ahead home run for the Swallows in Game 3.

Tuesday, October 25, 2022, 6:36 pm (JST) at Kyocera Dome Osaka in Osaka, Osaka Prefecture
Team	1	2	3	4	5	6	7	8	9	R	H	E
Yakult	0	0	0	0	3	0	1	0	3	7	11	0
Orix	0	0	0	0	0	0	0	0	1	1	8	1
WP: Keiji Takahashi (1–0) LP: Hiroya Miyagi (0–1); Home runs: YAK: Tetsuto Yamada (1); ORX: None; Attendance: 33,098; Boxscore

For Game 3, the series shifted to Orix's home stadium, the Kyocera Dome Osaka. The game was scoreless into the top of the fifth inning, when Tetsuto Yamada hit a three-run home run for the Swallows off of Orix's starting pitcher, Hiroya Miyagi. Keiji Takahashi started for Yakult and threw six innings without allowing a run, only permitting three hits and two walks against seven strikeouts. Yakult added their fourth run when their cleanup hitter, Munetaka Murakami, drew a walk with the bases loaded. Murakami drove in two runs in the ninth inning on his second double of the game, and Osuna drove Murakami home with an RBI single to extend the lead to 7–0. Orix scored one run in the bottom of the ninth inning, but lost 7–1.

=== Game 4 ===
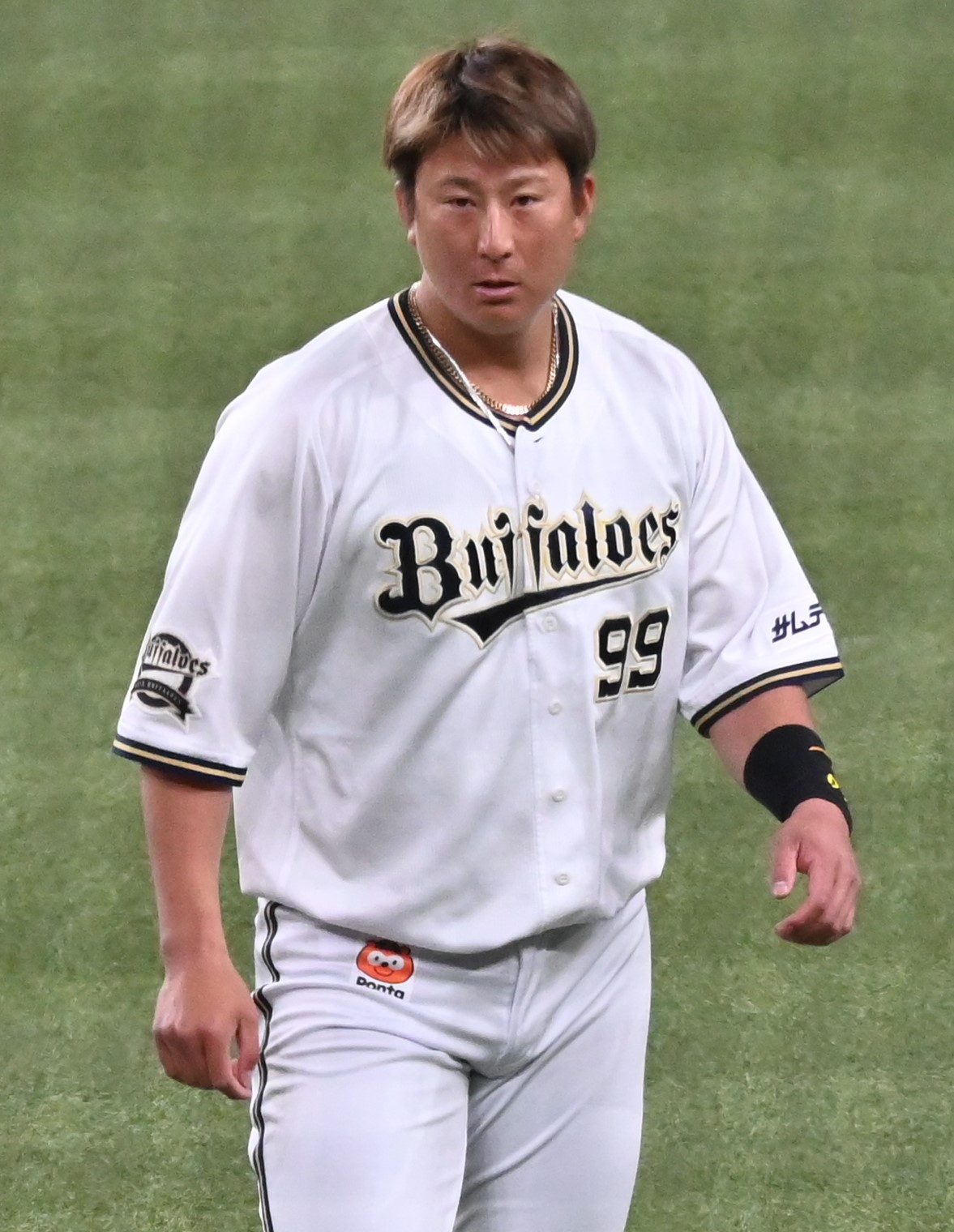
Yutaro Sugimoto's RBI single in the third inning was Game 4's only run.

Wednesday, October 26, 2022, 6:35 pm (JST) at Kyocera Dome Osaka in Osaka, Osaka Prefecture
Team	1	2	3	4	5	6	7	8	9	R	H	E
Yakult	0	0	0	0	0	0	0	0	0	0	6	1
Orix	0	0	1	0	0	0	0	0	X	1	3	1
WP: Yuki Udagawa (1–0) LP: Masanori Ishikawa (0–1) Sv: Jacob Waguespack (1); Home runs: YAK: None; ORX: None; Attendance: 33,210; Boxscore

Taisuke Yamaoka started Game 4 for Orix while Masanori Ishikawa started for Yakult. Orix's Keita Nakagawa was hit by a pitch in the third inning and Yutaro Sugimoto scored the run with an RBI single. Yamaoka pitched 4 1/3 innings, allowing a triple to Yakult in the fifth inning, but relief pitcher Yuki Udagawa prevented the runner from scoring with two strikeouts. Orix's pitchers threw a combined shutout, allowing six hits to the Swallows.

=== Game 5 ===
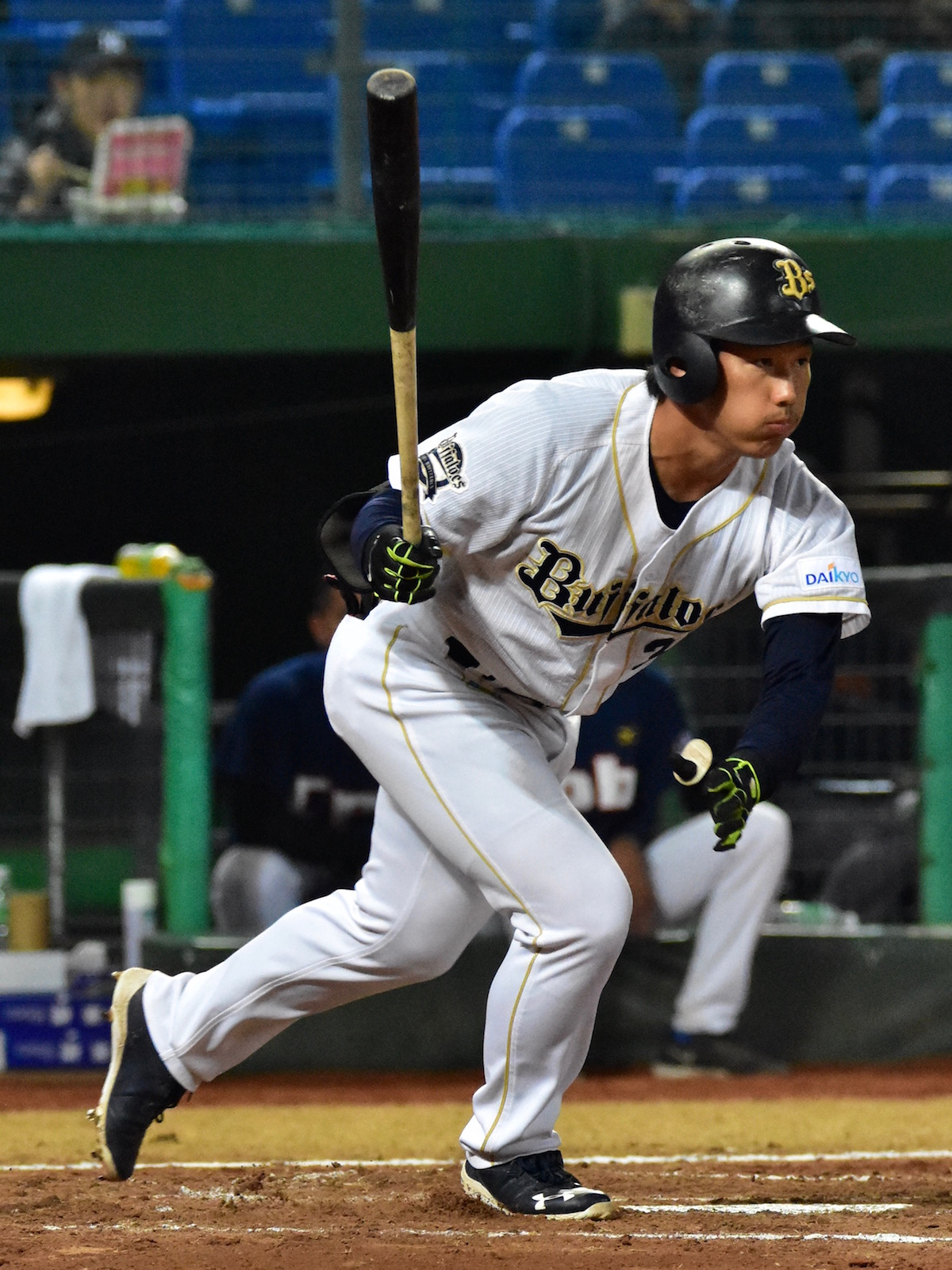
Masataka Yoshida hit two home runs for Orix in Game 5, including the walk-off home run

Thursday, October 27, 2022, 6:35 pm (JST) at Kyocera Dome Osaka in Osaka, Osaka Prefecture
Team	1	2	3	4	5	6	7	8	9	R	H	E
Yakult	1	1	0	0	0	2	0	0	0	4	12	1
Orix	0	0	0	2	1	0	0	0	3	6	11	1
WP: Jacob Waguespack (1–0) LP: Scott McGough (0–1); Home runs: YAK: Domingo Santana (1); ORX: Masataka Yoshida 2 (2); Attendance: 33,135; Boxscore

Orix started Daiki Tajima in Game 5 while Yakult started Hikaru Yamashita. Yakult took the lead in the top of the first inning on a single by Norichika Aoki and an RBI single by José Osuna. In the second inning, Domingo Santana hit a solo home run for Yakult off of Tajima. The Buffaloes tied the game in the fourth inning with four hits off of Yamashita, including RBIs by Kotaro Kurebayashi and Kenya Wakatsuki. With the score tied at two, Masataka Yoshida hit a solo home run for Orix off of Yamashita in the bottom of the fifth inning. In the top of the sixth inning, the Swallows retook the lead with an RBI double by Aoki. Entering the bottom of the ninth inning trailing 4–3, Orix tied the game on a walk and an infield single, followed by a throwing error by Scott McGough that allowed the tying run to score. Yoshida hit a walk-off home run off of McGough to end the game.

=== Game 6 ===
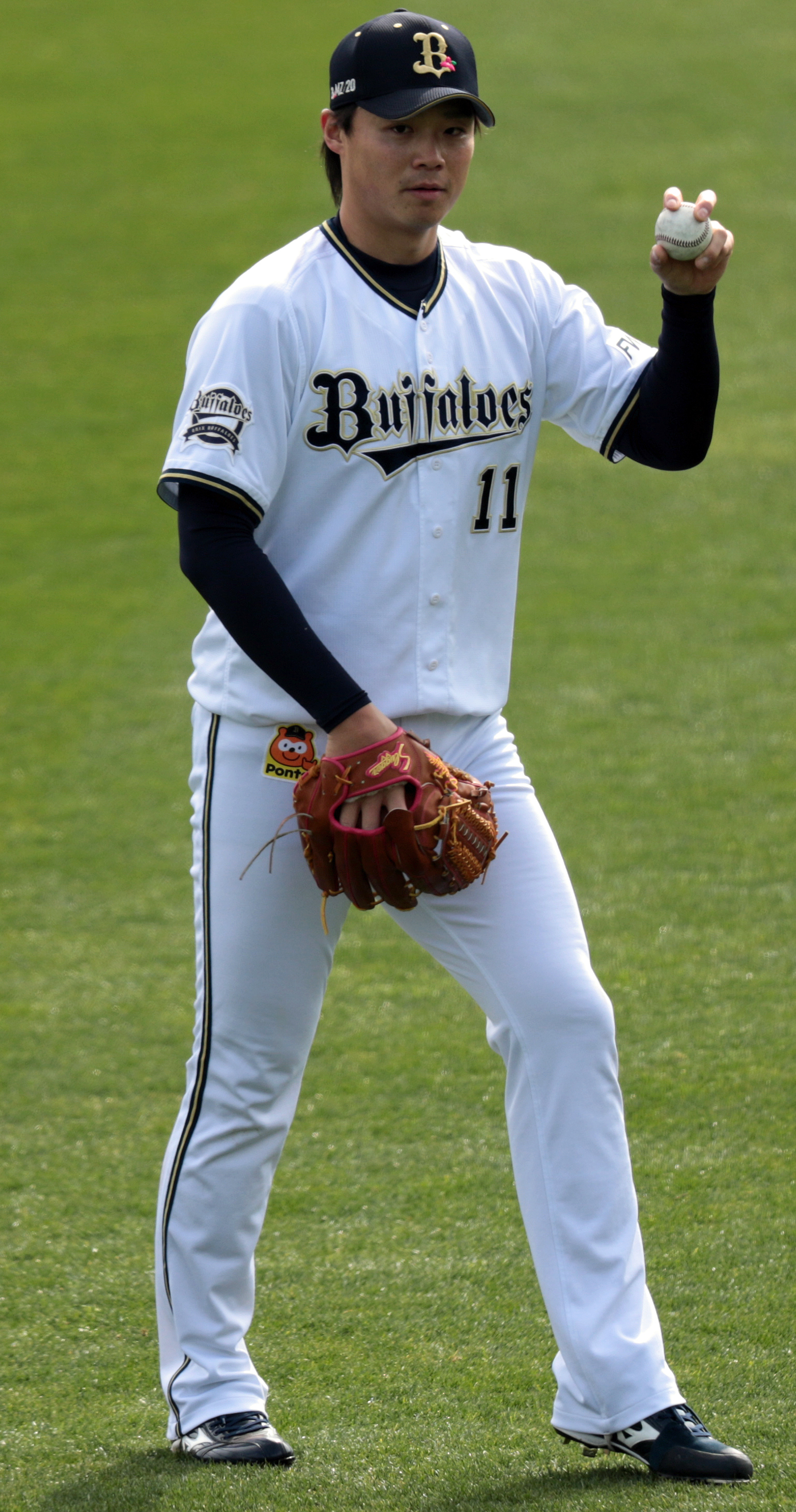
Sachiya Yamasaki and four relief pitchers combined to allow one hit in Game 6.

Saturday, October 29, 2022, 6:33 pm (JST) at Meiji Jingu Stadium in Shinjuku, Tokyo
Team	1	2	3	4	5	6	7	8	9	R	H	E
Orix	0	0	0	0	0	1	0	0	2	3	7	0
Yakult	0	0	0	0	0	0	0	0	0	0	1	1
WP: Sachiya Yamasaki (1–0) LP: Yasuhiro Ogawa (1–1) Sv: Jacob Waguespack (2); Home runs: ORX: None; YAK: None; Attendance: 29,379; Boxscore

Sachiya Yamasaki started Game 6 for Orix, while Yasuhiro Ogawa started for Yakult. Yamasaki pitched five shutout innings. The game remained scoreless until the top of the sixth inning, when Ryo Ota hit a single, was advanced to second base on a sacrifice hit, and scored on an RBI single by Yutaro Sugimoto. Orix scored two more runs in the ninth inning following a throwing error by Scott McGough. Yakult led off the game with a hit in the first inning, but Yamasaki and four relief pitchers (Yuki Udagawa, Yoshihisa Hirano, Soichiro Yamazaki, and Jacob Waguespack) combined to shut out Yakult, only allowing the one hit.

=== Game 7 ===
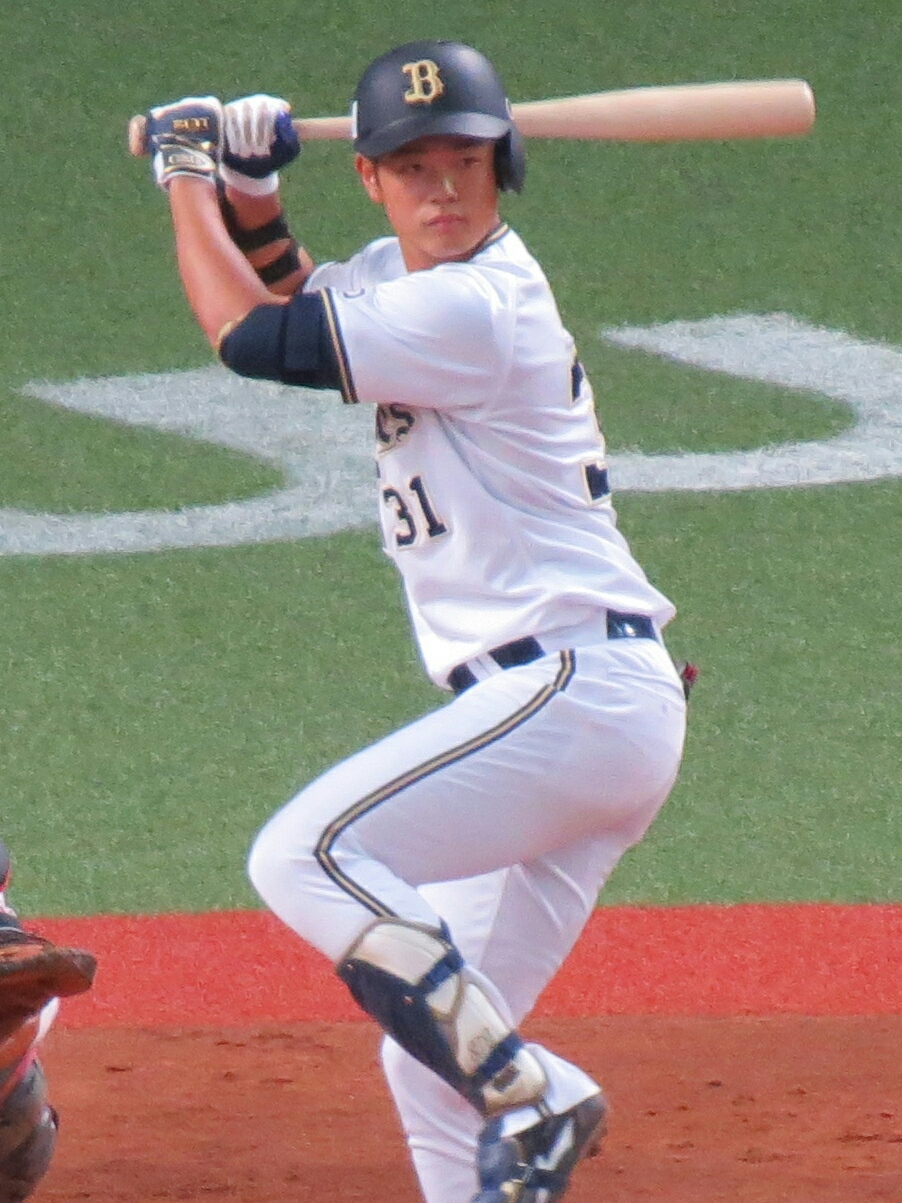
Ryo Ota led off Game 7 for Orix with a home run.

Sunday, October 30, 2022, 6:33 pm (JST) at Meiji Jingu Stadium in Shinjuku, Tokyo
Team	1	2	3	4	5	6	7	8	9	R	H	E
Orix	1	0	0	0	4	0	0	0	0	5	8	1
Yakult	0	0	0	0	0	0	0	4	0	4	8	1
WP: Hiroya Miyagi (1–1) LP: Cy Sneed (0–1) Sv: Jacob Waguespack (3); Home runs: ORX: Ryo Ota (1); YAK: José Osuna (2); Attendance: 29,381; Boxscore

In Game 7, Hiroya Miyagi started for Orix and Cy Sneed started for Yakult. Ryo Ota led off the game for Orix with a solo home run. In the top of the fifth inning, Orix's Torai Fushimi singled, followed by bunt singles by Miyagi and Ota. Yakult's first baseman José Osuna turned a double play, but a walk loaded the bases, a hit by pitch scored a run, and then a line drive by Yutaro Sugimoto to center fielder Yasutaka Shiomi was misplayed for an error that allowed three runs to score. Pitching on short rest, Miyagi allowed three hits and one walk over five innings. Yakult scored four runs in the eighth inning, including a three-run home run by Osuna, but Motoki Higa was able to escape the inning for Orix with a 5–4 lead. Orix held on to win the game and the series, as Jacob Waguespack earned his third save of the series. Sugimoto won the Japan Series Most Valuable Player Award.

== See also ==
- 2022 Korean Series
- 2022 World Series
