= Hitomi Honda (baseball) =

Japanese baseball player (born 1999)

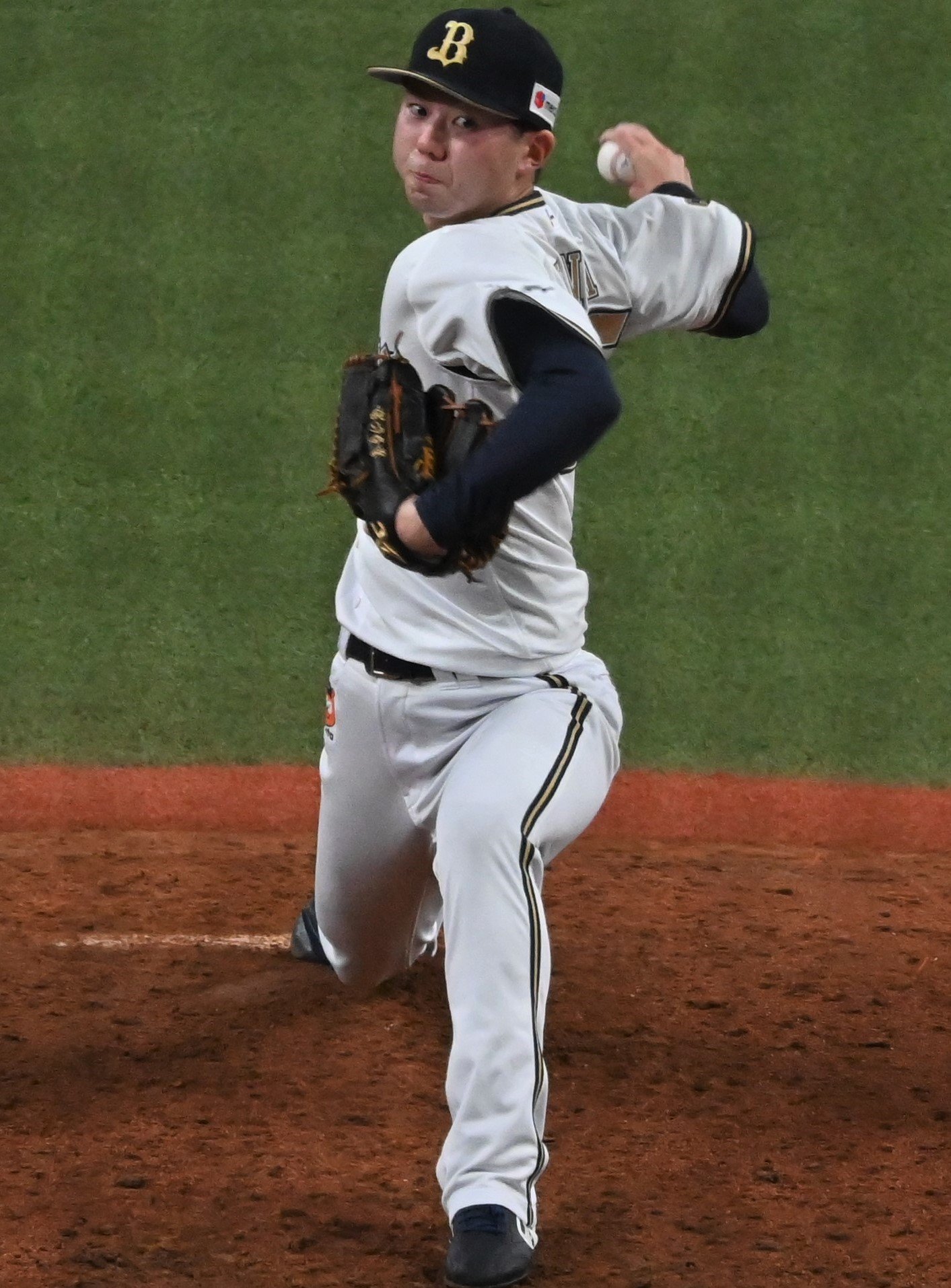

Orix Buffaloes – No. 46
- Pitcher
- Born: July 27, 1999 (age 26); Yokohama, Kanagawa, Japan
- Bats: Left Throws: Right

NPB debut
- November 1, 2020, for the Orix Buffaloes

Career statistics (through 2024 season)
- Win–loss record: 6–6
- Earned run average: 4.66
- Strikeouts: 101
- Saves: 2
- Holds: 30

Teams
- Orix Buffaloes (2020–present)

Career highlights and awards
- Japan Series champion (2022)

Hitomi Honda (本田 仁海, Honda Hitomi; born July 27, 1999) is a professional Japanese baseball player. He is a pitcher for the Orix Buffaloes of Nippon Professional Baseball (NPB).
