= Sachiya Yamasaki =

Japanese baseball player (born 1992)

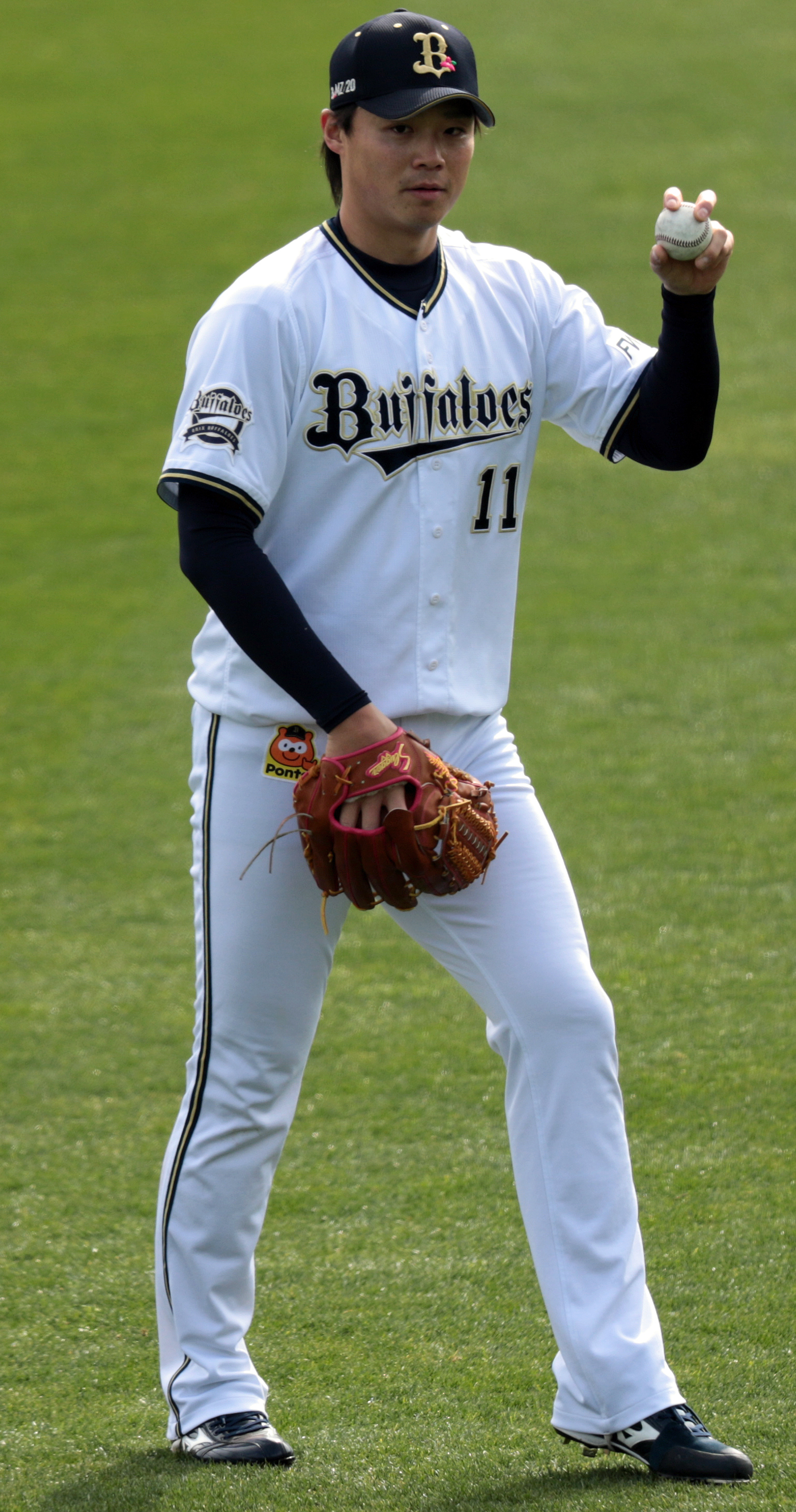

Hokkaido Nippon-Ham Fighters – No. 18
- Pitcher
- Born: September 9, 1992 (age 33); Tokorozawa, Saitama, Japan
- Bats: Left Throws: Left

NPB debut
- March 29, 2015, for the Orix Buffaloes

Career statistics (through 2024 season)
- Win–loss record: 49-51
- Earned Run Average: 3.73
- Strikeouts: 505
- Saves: 0
- Holds: 3
- Stats at Baseball Reference

Teams
- Orix Buffaloes (2015–2023); Hokkaido Nippon-Ham Fighters (2024–present)

Career highlights and awards
- Japan Series champion (2022); 2x NPB All-Star (2023, 2024)

Sachiya Yamasaki (山崎 福也, Yamasaki Sachiya; born September 9, 1992 in Tokorozawa, Saitama, Japan) is a Japanese professional baseball pitcher for the Hokkaido Nippon-Ham Fighters of Nippon Professional Baseball (NPB).
