= Ryo Ohta =

Japanese baseball player (born 2001)

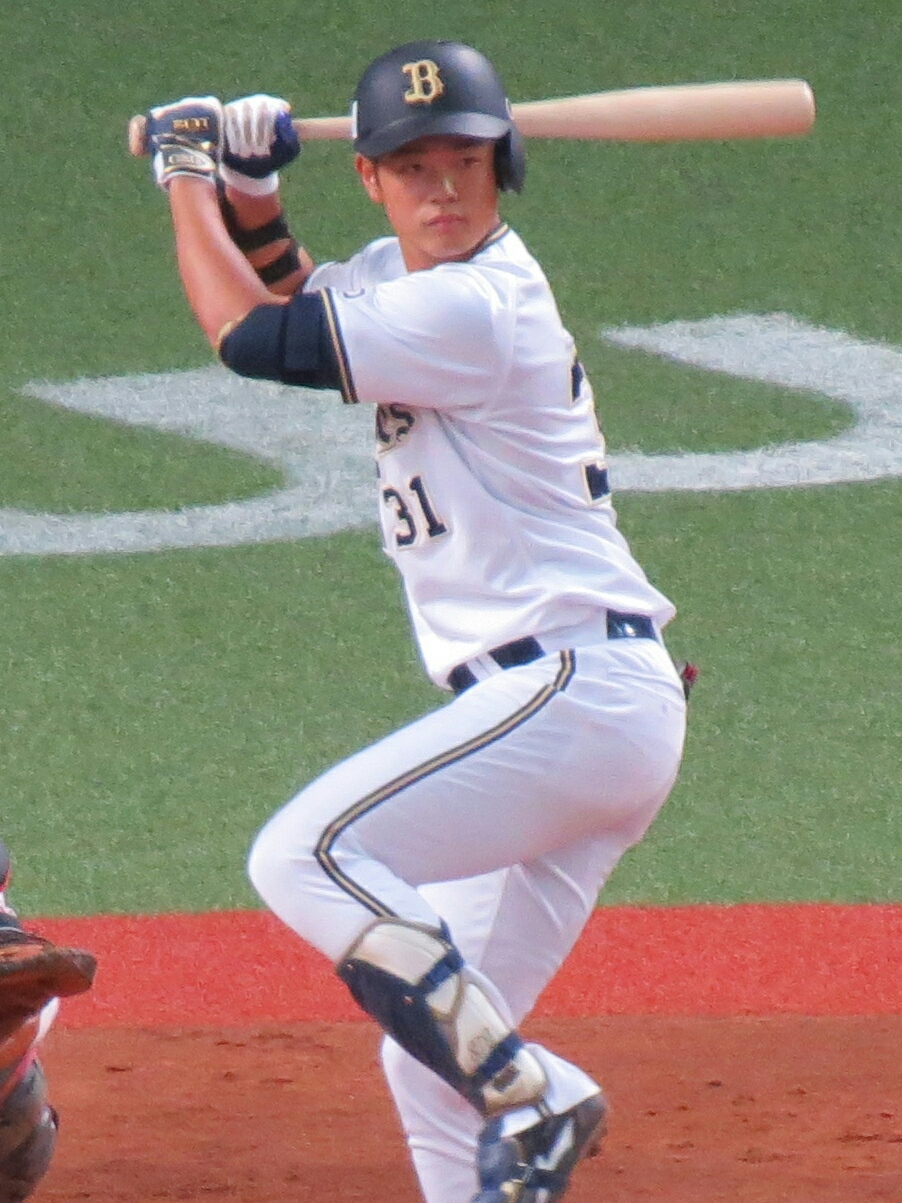

Orix Buffaloes – No. 1
- Infielder
- Born: February 14, 2001 (age 24); Habikino, Osaka, Japan
- Bats: Right Throws: Right

NPB debut
- September 14, 2019, for the Orix Buffaloes

NPB statistics (through 2025 season)
- Batting average: .257
- Home runs: 25
- Runs batted in: 118
- Stats at Baseball Reference

Teams
- Orix Buffaloes (2019–present)

Career highlights and awards
- Japan Series champion (2022); NPB All-Star (2025)

Ryo Ohta (太田 椋, Ohta Ryo; born February 14, 2001) is a Japanese professional baseball infielder for the Orix Buffaloes of Nippon Professional Baseball (NPB).
