= Sōma Uchiyama =

Japanese baseball player (born 2002)

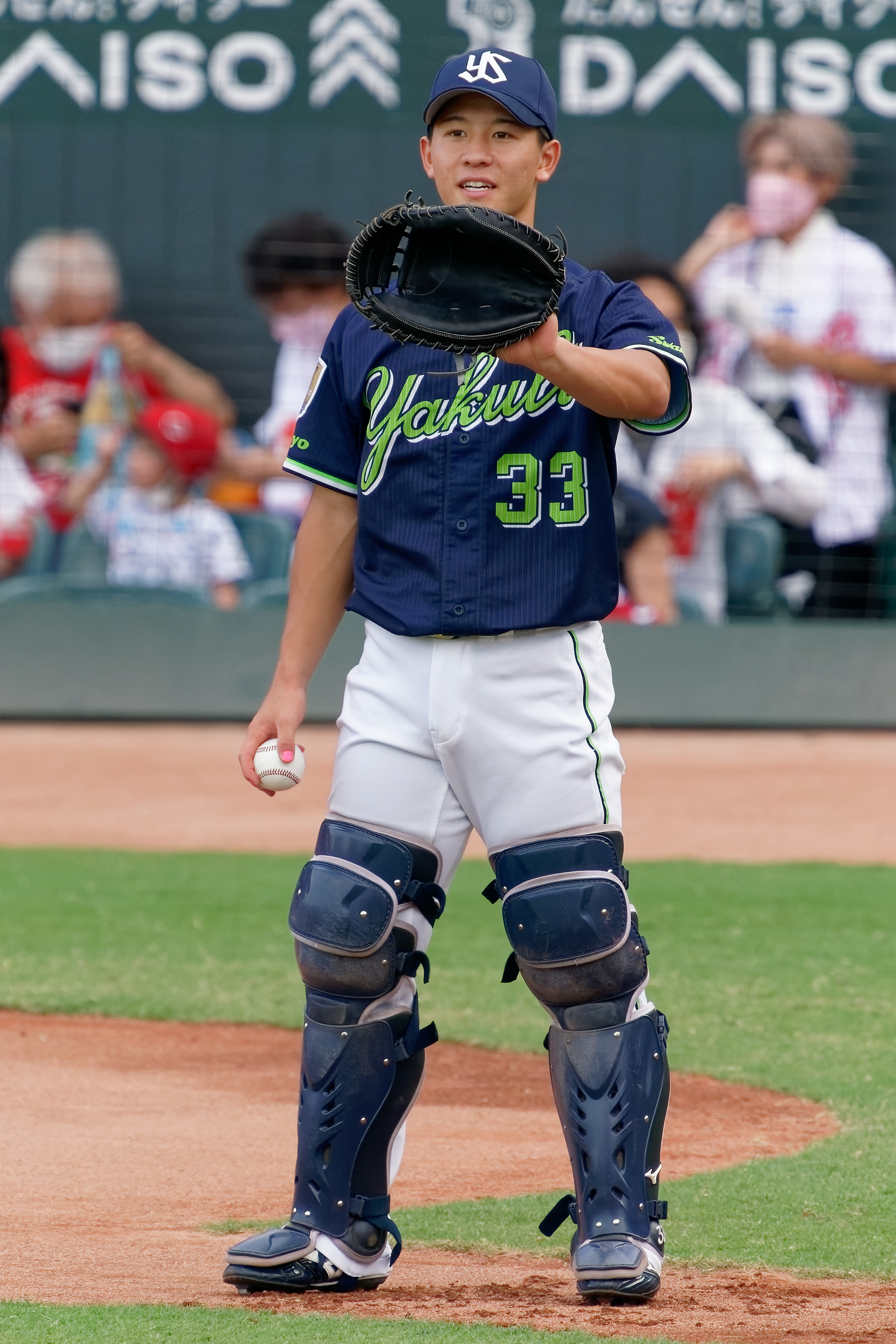

Tokyo Yakult Swallows – No. 3
- Catcher/Infielder/Outfielder
- Born: June 30, 2002 (age 23); Nakaniikawa District, Toyama, Japan
- Bats: Right Throws: Right

NPB debut
- April 8, 2021, for the Tokyo Yakult Swallows

Career statistics (through 2025 season)
- Batting average: .242
- Home runs: 18
- RBI: 497
- Hits: 217
- Stolen base: 12
- Stats at Baseball Reference

Teams
- Tokyo Yakult Swallows (2021–present)

Sōma Uchiyama (内山 壮真, Uchiyama Sōma; born June 30, 2002 in Nakaniikawa, Toyama, Japan) is a professional Japanese baseball player. He plays infielder for the Tokyo Yakult Swallows.

Uchiyama hit a three-run home run to tie Game 2 of the 2022 Japan Series.
