= Jacob Waguespack =

American baseball player (born 1993)

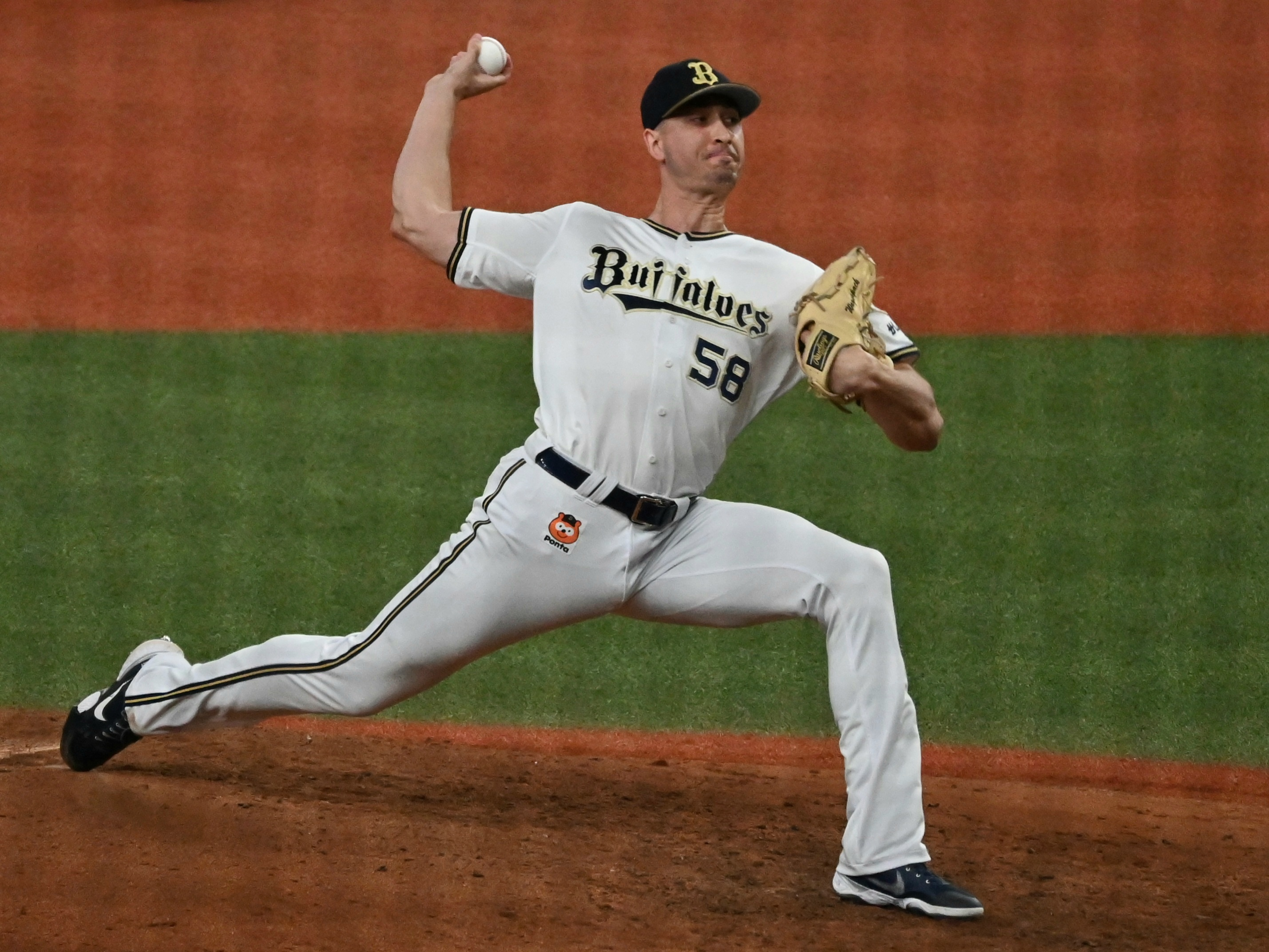
- Waguespack with the Orix Buffaloes

Detroit Tigers – No. 58
- Pitcher
- Born: November 5, 1993 (age 33); Prairieville, Louisiana, U.S.
- Bats: Right Throws: Right

Professional debut
- MLB: May 27, 2019, for the Toronto Blue Jays
- NPB: April 29, 2022, for the Orix Buffaloes

MLB statistics (through 2026 season)
- Win–loss record: 7–7
- Earned run average: 4.30
- Strikeouts: 125

NPB statistics (through 2023 season)
- Win–loss record: 6–13
- Earned run average: 4.02
- Strikeouts: 148
- Stats at Baseball Reference

Teams
- Toronto Blue Jays (2019–2020); Orix Buffaloes (2022–2023); Tampa Bay Rays (2024); Detroit Tigers (2026–present)

Career highlights and awards
- Japan Series champion (2022)

Jacob Daniel Waguespack (/ˈwæɡɪspæk/ WAG-iss-pak; born November 5, 1993) is an American professional baseball pitcher for the Detroit Tigers of Major League Baseball (MLB). He has previously played in MLB for the Toronto Blue Jays and Tampa Bay Rays, and in Nippon Professional Baseball (NPB) for the Orix Buffaloes.

== High school and college ==
Waguespack attended Dutchtown High School in Geismar, Louisiana. In his senior season, he pitched to an 8–2 win–loss record, 0.37 earned run average (ERA), and 87 strikeouts in 53 1/3 innings. He was selected by the Pittsburgh Pirates in the 37th round of the 2012 Major League Baseball draft, but did not sign, and went to the University of Mississippi, where he played three seasons for the Ole Miss Rebels. Waguespack saw limited action in his first two seasons of college baseball, pitching as both a starter and reliever. In his third and final season with the Rebels, he made 25 relief appearances and posted a 3.33 ERA and 34 strikeouts in 46 innings pitched.

== Professional career ==
=== Philadelphia Phillies ===
Undrafted after leaving Mississippi, Waguespack signed with the Philadelphia Phillies organization and was assigned to the Rookie-level Gulf Coast League Phillies. He finished the season with the Low–A Williamsport Crosscutters, and posted a combined 0–1 record, 2.00 ERA, and 32 strikeouts in 27 innings. Waguespack played the entire 2016 season with the Single–A Lakewood BlueClaws, and went 4–2 with a 3.52 ERA and 72 strikeouts in 43 relief appearances. He began the 2017 season as a reliever with the High–A Clearwater Threshers, and was later converted into a starting pitcher. Waguespack was promoted to the Double–A Reading Fightin Phils in August, where he continued to pitch as a starter. In 105 1/3 total innings, he pitched to a 9–7 record, 3.42 ERA, and 108 strikeouts.

Waguespack began the 2018 season with Reading, and was later promoted to the Triple–A Lehigh Valley IronPigs.

=== Toronto Blue Jays ===
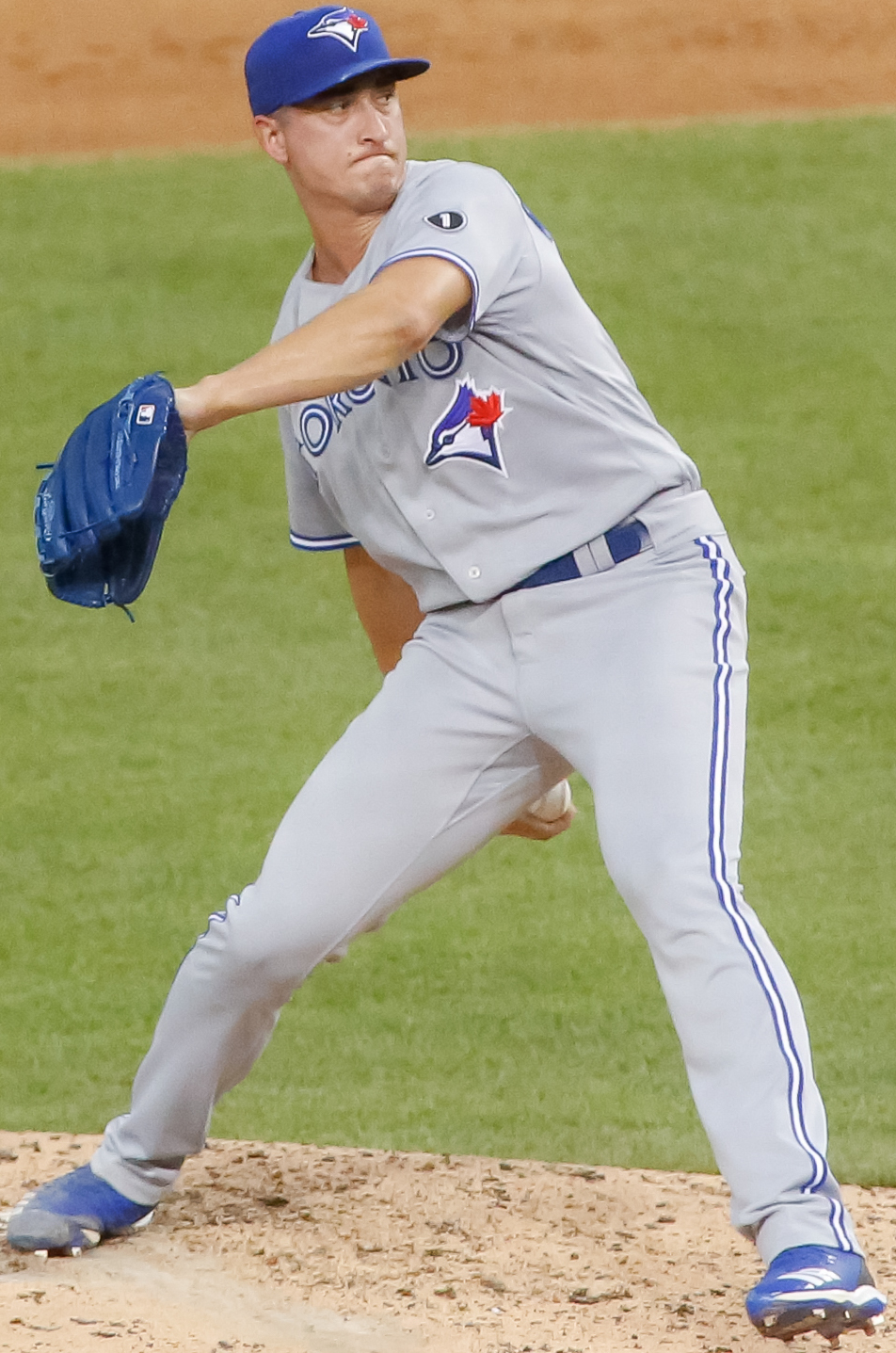
Waguespack with the Toronto Blue Jays in 2020

On July 31, 2018, Waguespack was traded to the Toronto Blue Jays in exchange for Aaron Loup. Waguespack was assigned to the Triple-A Buffalo Bisons for the remainder of the 2018 season, and finished the year with a combined 6–10 record, 4.80 ERA, and 112 strikeouts in 122 innings. The Blue Jays added him to their 40-man roster after the 2018 season.

==== Major Leagues ====
On May 26, 2019, Waguespack was called up by the Blue Jays. He made his major league debut the next day, pitching four innings of relief against the Tampa Bay Rays. Waguespack allowed three runs (two earned) and set a Blue Jays franchise record for the most strikeouts for a reliever in their debut with seven. On July 3, he earned his first major league win, throwing five innings and allowing three runs as the Blue Jays beat the Boston Red Sox 6–3. On August 22, in a start against the Los Angeles Dodgers, Waguespack threw seven scoreless innings, allowing only one hit and retiring the final fourteen batters he faced. In doing so, he became just the sixth pitcher in franchise history to record a start of at least seven innings with no runs and one hit allowed in his first ten career games. Waguespack appeared in sixteen games for the Blue Jays in 2019, thirteen of which were starts and three of which were extended relief outings. He posted a 4.38 ERA and struck out 63 batters in 78 innings.

With the 2020 Toronto Blue Jays, Waguespack appeared in 11 games, compiling a 0–0 record with 8.15 ERA and 16 strikeouts in 17.2 innings pitched. On March 6, 2021, Waguespack was designated for assignment following the waiver claim of Joel Payamps. On March 10, Waguespack cleared waivers and was outrighted to the Triple-A Buffalo Bisons. returning to Buffalo for the Bisons' 2021 Opening Day roster Following the 2021 season, Waguespack became a free agent.

=== Orix Buffaloes ===
On December 17, 2021, Waguespack signed with the Orix Buffaloes of Nippon Professional Baseball. He played a key role as the team's closer in 2022, most notably earning three saves in the 2022 Japan Series, including one in Game 7, contributing to Orix's first Japan Series championship since 1996, and their first since the merger with the Osaka Kintetsu Buffaloes in 2004. He was also the only active foreigner on the team's roster during their Japan Series run.

On December 23, 2022, he resigned a one-year contract extension for the 2023 season. In 31 games for Orix, he posted a 4–7 record and 5.77 ERA with 67 strikeouts in 43 2/3 innings pitched. On December 1, 2023, the Buffaloes announced that Waguespack would not be brought back in 2024, making him a free agent.

=== Tampa Bay Rays ===
On January 15, 2024, Waguespack signed a minor league contract with the Tampa Bay Rays organization. On March 15, Tampa Bay selected his contract to the 40-man roster. He made four appearances for the Rays before he was optioned down to the Triple–A Durham Bulls on April 13. Waguespack suffered a shoulder injury while playing for Durham, and was placed on the injured list on May 6. After the injury was diagnosed as shoulder inflammation, he was transferred to the 60-day injured list on May 18.

On November 4, 2024, Waguespack and the Rays agreed to a one–year contract extension for the 2025 season worth $1.3 million. He was optioned to Triple-A Durham to begin the season, where he posted a 1–0 record and 0.46 ERA with 18 strikeouts over 15 appearances. Waguespack was designated for assignment by Tampa Bay on July 25, 2025. He was released by the team after clearing waivers on July 28.

=== Philadelphia Phillies (second stint) ===
On August 4, 2025, Waguespack signed a minor league contract with the Philadelphia Phillies. In 10 appearances for the Triple-A Lehigh Valley IronPigs, he logged a 1–0 record and 5.40 ERA with 13 strikeouts across 13 1/3 innings pitched. Waguespack elected free agency following the season on November 6.

=== Milwaukee Brewers ===
On January 29, 2026, Waguespack signed a minor league contract with the Milwaukee Brewers. On May 4, Waguespack was released by the Brewers organization. On May 10, he re-signed with Milwaukee on a new minor league contract. Waguespack made 16 appearances for the Triple-A Nashville Sounds, recording a 1.66 ERA with 33 strikeouts and one save across 21 2/3 innings pitched.

=== Detroit Tigers ===
On June 10, 2026, Waguespack was traded to the Detroit Tigers in exchange for a player to be named later or cash considerations. Two days later, the Tigers selected Waguespack's contract, adding him to their active roster. At the major league level, he pitched in 35 games, all but one in relief, posting a 2–2 record and a 2.49 ERA, with 35 strikeouts in 47 innings.

Waguespack elected free agency on October 29, 2026, but the Tigers resigned him to a one-year $1.3 million contract four days later.
