= Yasutaka Shiomi =

Japanese baseball player (born 1993)

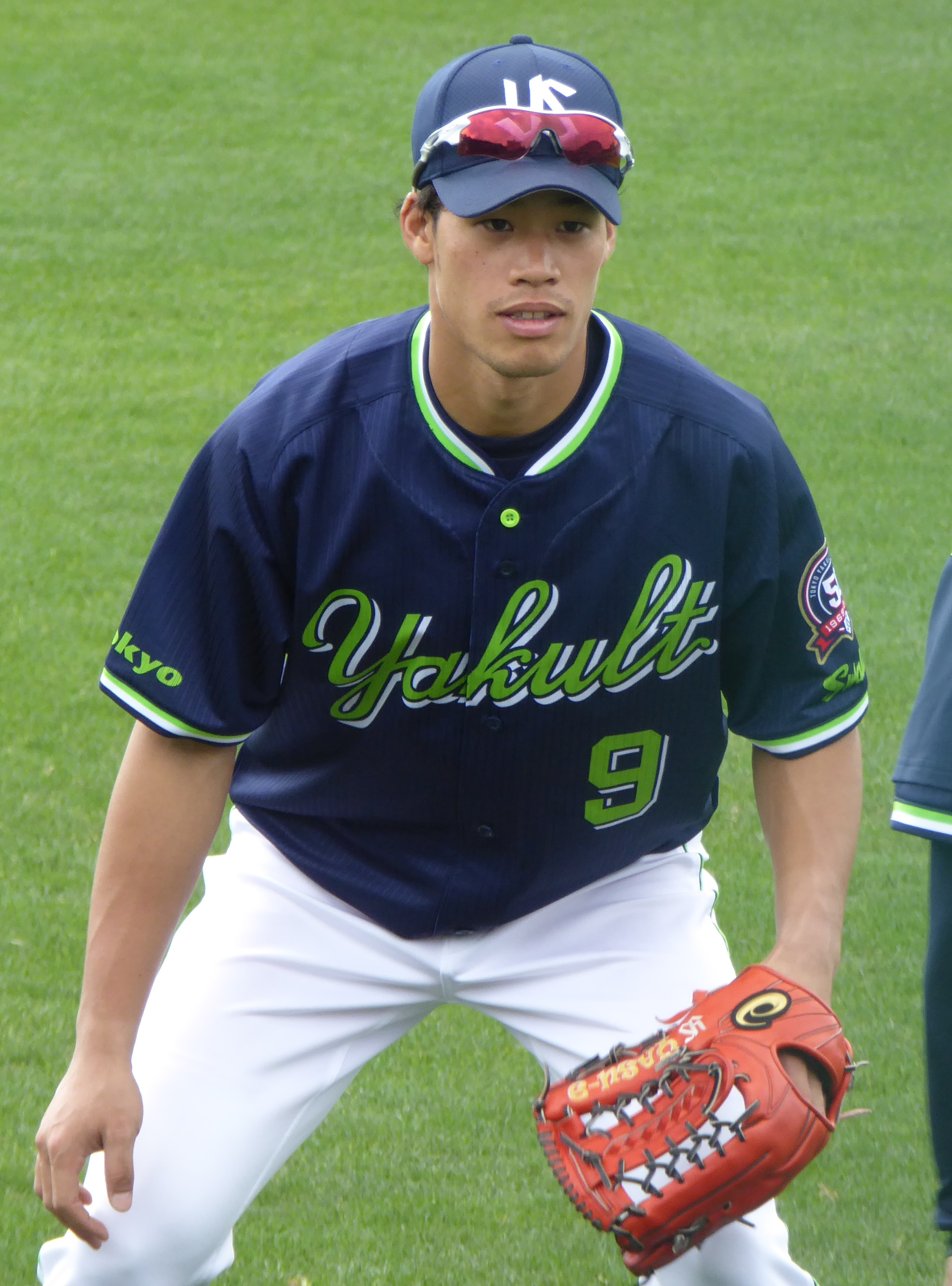

Tokyo Yakult Swallows – No. 9
- Outfielder
- Born: June 12, 1993 (age 32); Sagamihara, Kanagawa, Japan
- Bats: Right Throws: Right

NPB debut
- June 9, 2019, for the Tokyo Yakult Swallows

Career statistics (through 2024 season)
- Batting average: .270
- Hits: 415
- Home runs: 50
- RBIs: 180
- Stolen bases: 66
- Stats at Baseball Reference

Teams
- Tokyo Yakult Swallows (2018–present)

Career highlights and awards
- Japan Series champion (2021); Best Nine Award (2021); Mitsui Golden Glove Award (2022); Hit for the cycle on September 9, 2021; NPB All-Star (2022)

Yasutaka Shiomi (塩見 泰隆, Shiomi Yasutaka; born June 12, 1993 in Sagamihara, Kanagawa, Japan) is a Japanese professional baseball outfielder for the Tokyo Yakult Swallows of Nippon Professional Baseball (NPB).

== Career ==
On May 12, 2024, Shiomi was diagnosed with a torn ACL and meniscus in his left knee.
