= Kotaro Kurebayashi =

Japanese baseball player (born 2002)

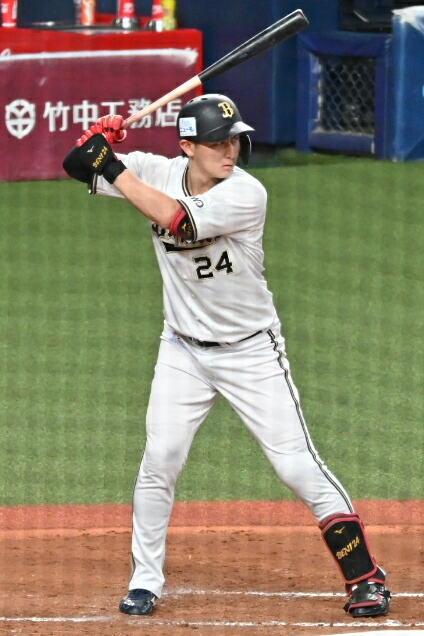

Orix Buffaloes – No. 24
- Infielder
- Born: February 7, 2002 (age 23); Fujieda, Shizuoka, Japan
- Bats: Right Throws: Right

NPB debut
- November 3, 2020, for the Orix Buffaloes

NPB statistics (through 2025 season)
- Batting average: .247
- Hits: 548
- Home runs: 35
- Runs batted in: 202
- Stats at Baseball Reference

Teams
- Orix Buffaloes (2020–present)

Career highlights and awards
- Best Nine Award (2023); Japan Series champion (2022); 3x NPB All-Star (2023–2025)
Medals
Men's baseball
Representing Japan
WBSC Premier12
Silver medal – second place	2024	Team

Kotaro Kurebayashi (紅林 弘太郎, Kurebayashi Kotaro; born February 2, 2002) is a Japanese professional baseball infielder for the Orix Buffaloes of Nippon Professional Baseball (NPB).
