= Keita Nakagawa =

Japanese baseball player (born 1996)

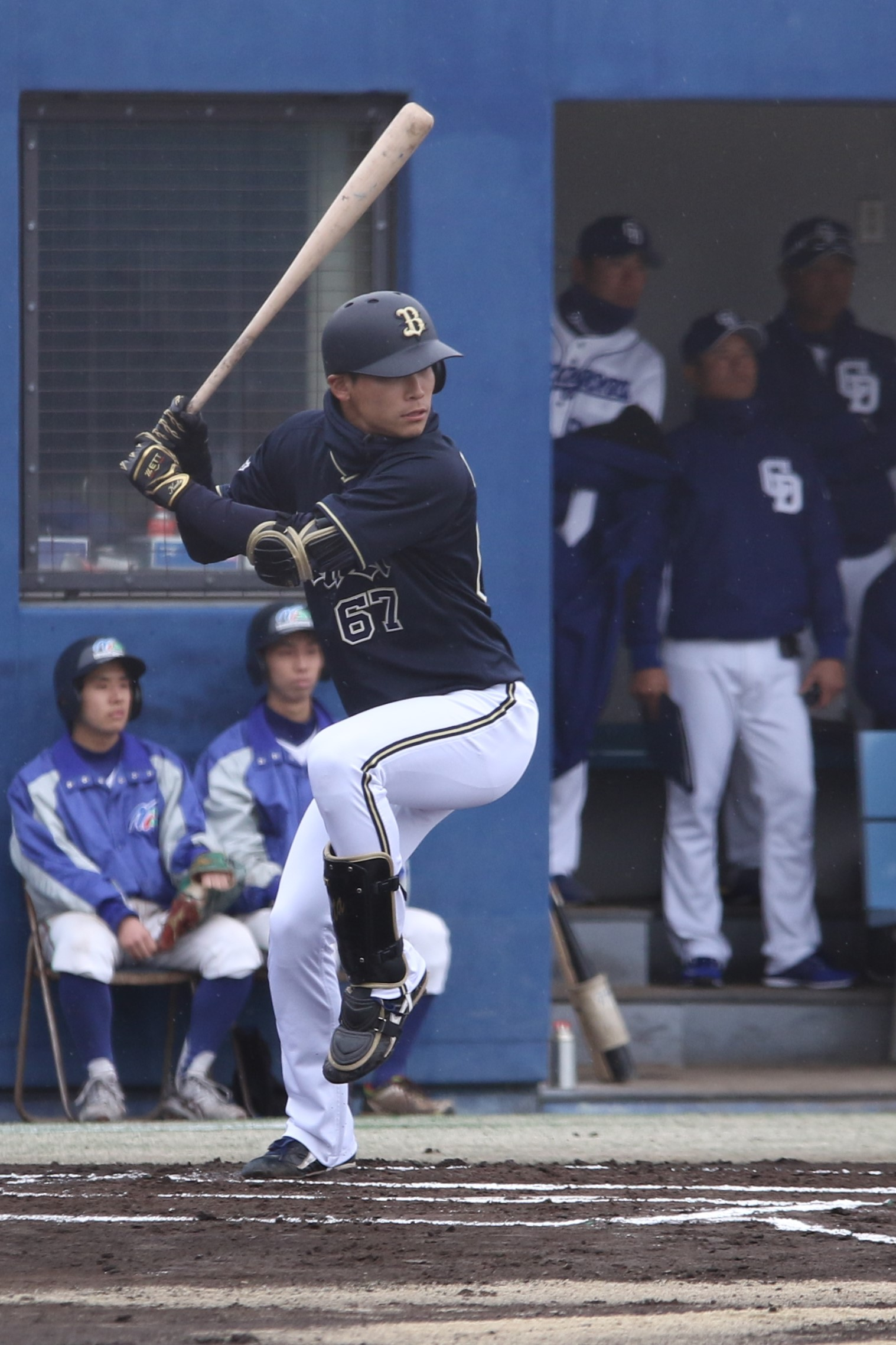

Orix Buffaloes – No. 67
- Infielder, Outfielder
- Born: April 12, 1996 (age 30); Hannan, Osaka, Japan
- Bats: Right Throws: Right

NPB debut
- April 20, 2019, for the Orix Buffaloes

NPB statistics (through 2023 season)
- Batting average: .260
- Hits: 415
- Home runs: 26
- Runs batted in: 158
- Stolen bases: 29

Teams
- Orix Buffaloes (2019–present)

Career highlights and awards
- Japan Series champion (2022)

Keita Nakagawa (中川 圭太 Nakagawa Keita, born April 12, 1996) is a Japanese professional baseball infielder or outfielder for the Orix Buffaloes in Japan's Nippon Professional Baseball.

== Amateur career ==
Played at Ozaki Boys since the first year of Elementary School and Izumisano Little Senior while enrolled at Hannan City Ozaki Junior High School. After graduating, he went to PL Gakuen High School, and during his first year he regularly played as a first baseman.

During his second year, Keita's teammates were discovered using violence against other students at a training facility on campus, which led the team to a six months suspension.

Under a new coach for his third year, Keita started playing second baseman and became the team's captain. We went on to win the state's championship that year. He finished his high school career with 28 home runs.

After his final year, he submitted a professional appointment report to the Japan Student Baseball Federation, but because he was not taken by any team in the NPB, he enrolled at Toyo University.
