= Atsuki Yuasa =

Japanese baseball player (born 1999)

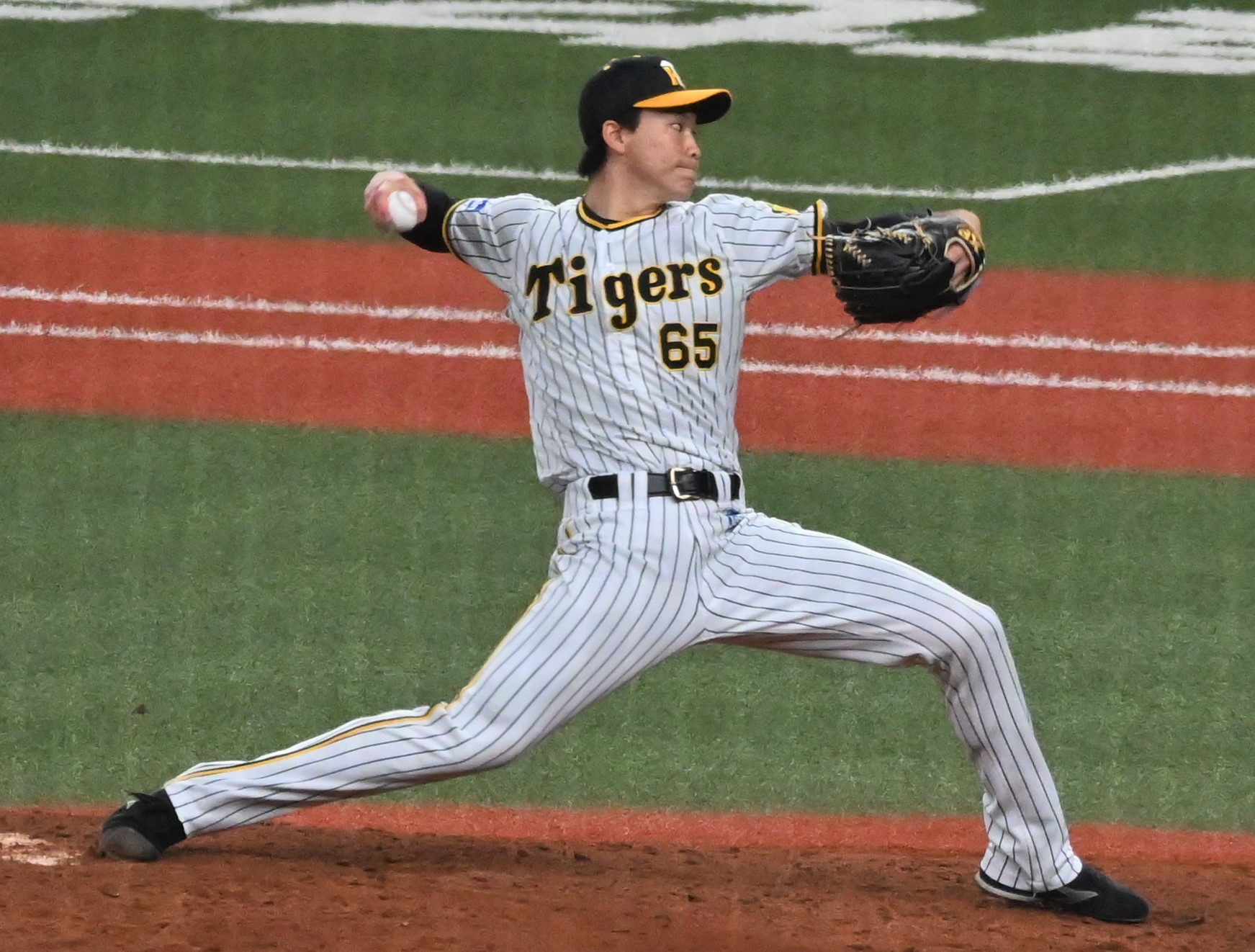

Hanshin Tigers – No. 65
- Pitcher
- Born: July 17, 1999 (age 27); Owase, Mie, Japan
- Bats: Right Throws: Right

NPB debut
- June 3, 2021, for the Hanshin Tigers

Career statistics (through 2025 season)
- Win–loss record: 6–9
- Earned run average: 2.43
- Strikeouts: 111
- Saves: 8
- Holds: 68
- Stats at Baseball Reference

Teams
- Hanshin Tigers (2021–present)

Career highlights and awards
- 1× Central League Most Valuable Setup pitcher (2022); 1× NPB All-Star (2022); 1× Japan Series Champion (2023)
Medals
Men's baseball
Representing Japan
World Baseball Classic
Gold medal – first place	2023 Miami	Team

Atsuki Yuasa (湯浅 京己, Yuasa Atsuki; born July 17, 1999) is a professional Japanese baseball player. He is a pitcher for the Hanshin Tigers of Nippon Professional Baseball (NPB).
