= José Osuna =

Venezuelan baseball player (born 1992)

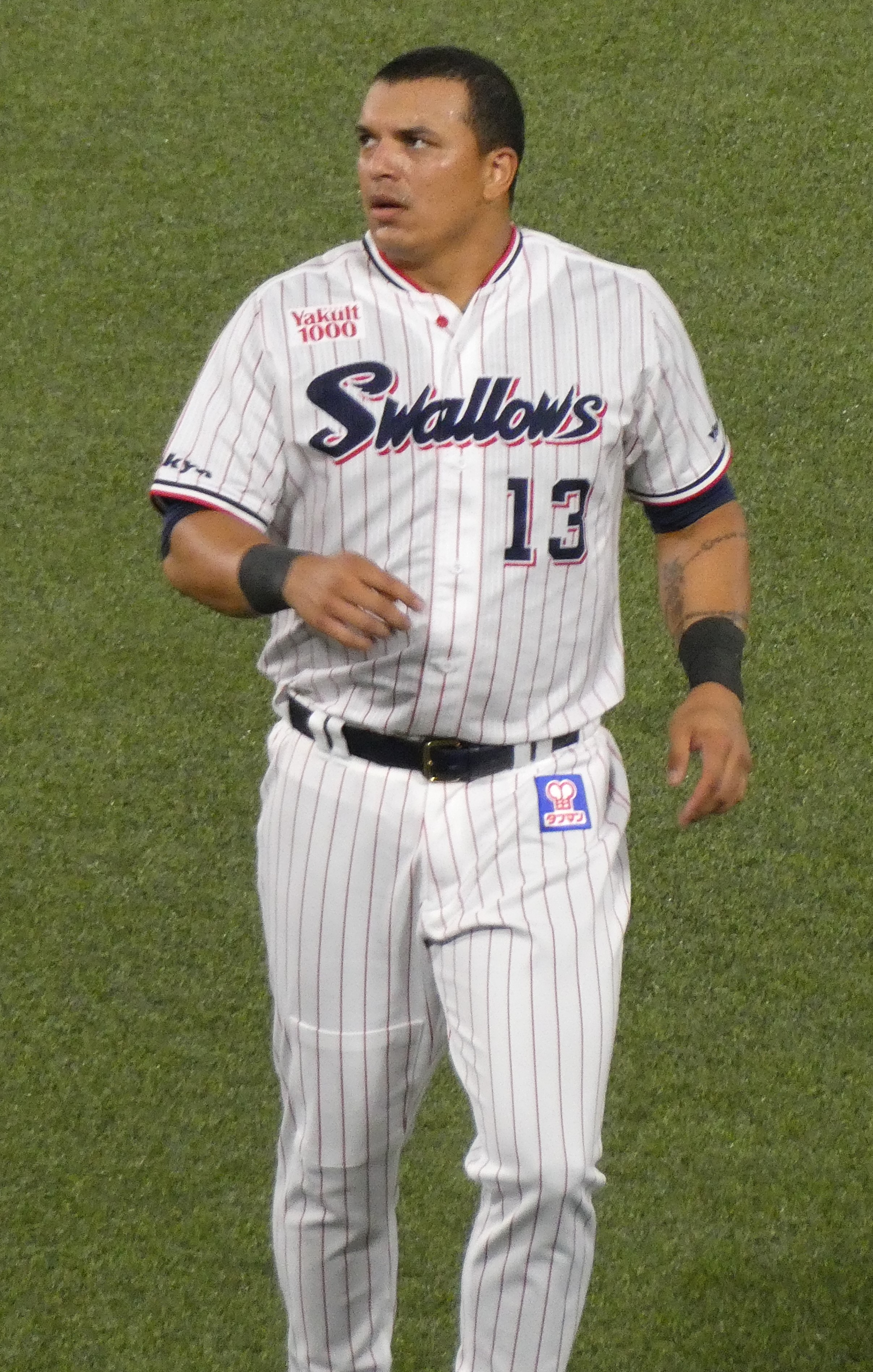
- Osuna with the Tokyo Yakult Swallows in 2021

Tokyo Yakult Swallows – No. 13
- Outfielder / First baseman / Third baseman
- Born: December 12, 1992 (age 33); Trujillo, Venezuela
- Bats: Right Throws: Right

Professional debut
- MLB: April 18, 2017, for the Pittsburgh Pirates
- NPB: April 23, 2021, for the Tokyo Yakult Swallows

MLB statistics (through 2020 season)
- Batting average: .241
- Home runs: 24
- Runs batted in: 88

NPB statistics (through August 18, 2026)
- Batting average: .258
- Home runs: 92
- Runs batted in: 366
- Stats at Baseball Reference

Teams
- Pittsburgh Pirates (2017–2020); Tokyo Yakult Swallows (2021–present)

Career highlights and awards
- Japan Series champion (2021)

José Gregorio Osuna (born December 12, 1992) is a Venezuelan professional baseball outfielder and first baseman for the Tokyo Yakult Swallows of Nippon Professional Baseball (NPB). He has previously played in Major League Baseball (MLB) for the Pittsburgh Pirates.

== Career ==
=== Pittsburgh Pirates ===
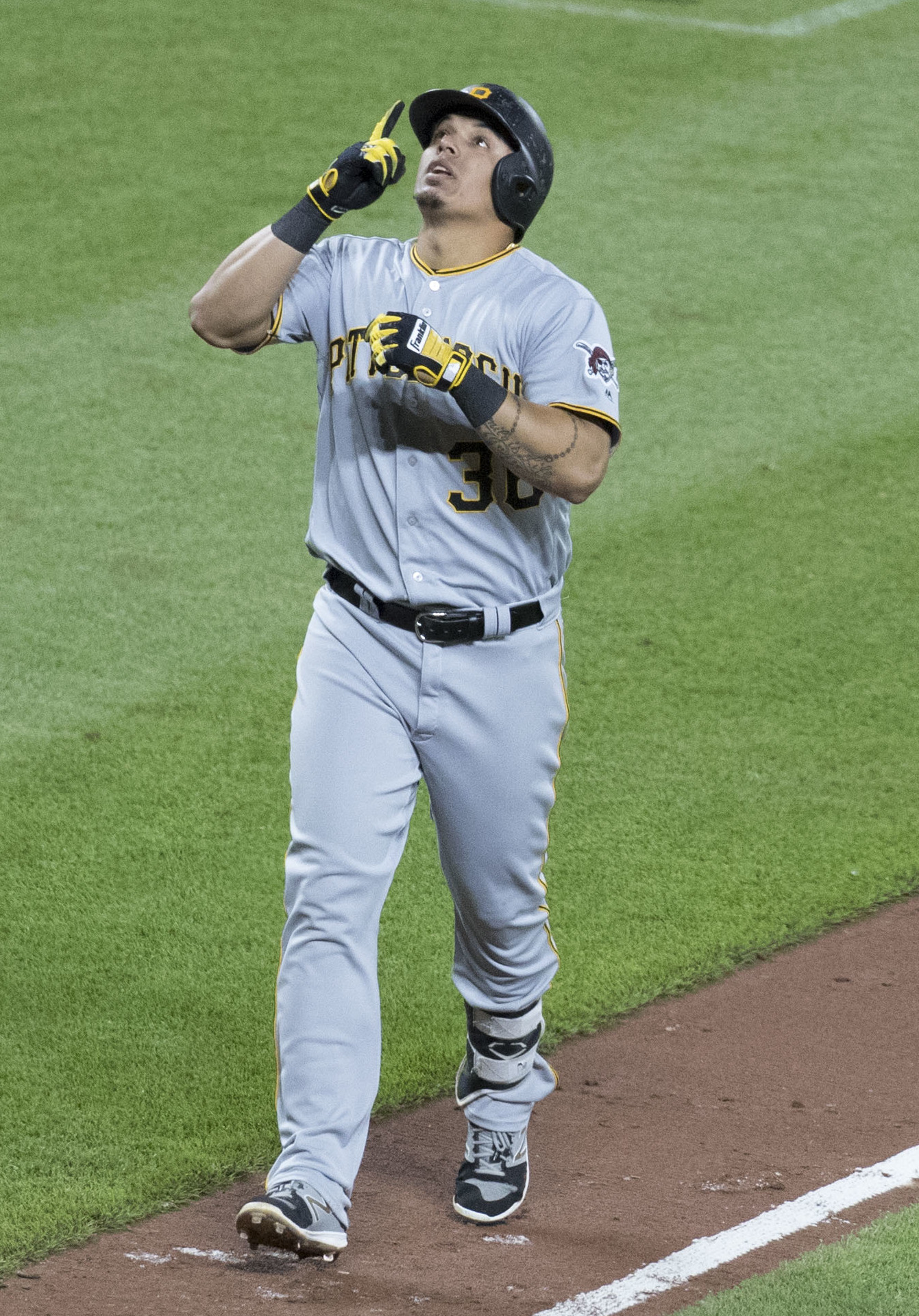
Osuna with the Pittsburgh Pirates in 2017

Osuna signed with the Pittsburgh Pirates as an international free agent in December 2009. He made his professional debut with the Venezuelan Summer League Pirates, batting .251/.325/.465 in 64 contests. The next year, Osuna split the year between the Gulf Coast League Pirates and the Low-A State College Spikes, accumulating a .328/.397/.505 slash line between the two teams. In 2012, he played for the Single-A West Virginia Power, logging a .280/.324/.454 batting line with career-highs in home runs (16) and RBI (72). In 2013, Osuna played for the High-A Bradenton Marauders, slashing .244/.298/.357 with 8 home runs and 48 RBI. The next year, Osuna returned to Bradenton and improved upon the previous season, batting .296/.347/.458 with 10 home runs and 57 RBI. In 2015, Osuna split the season between Bradenton and the Double-A Altoona Curve, hitting a cumulative .286/.329/.435 with 12 home runs and 81 RBI in 129 games between the two teams. He split the 2016 season between Altoona and the Triple-A Indianapolis Indians, posting a .279/.331/.457 slash line with 13 home runs and 69 RBI.

The Pirates added him to their 40-man roster after the 2016 season. The Pirates promoted Osuna to the major leagues for the first time on April 18, 2017. His first major league hit, a triple off of New York Yankees starter CC Sabathia on April 21. He finished his rookie season hitting .233/.269/.428 across 104 major league contests. In 2018, Osuna split the year between Indianapolis and Pittsburgh, slashing .226/.252/.396 with 3 home runs and 11 RBI in 51 games with the Pirates. In 2019, Osuna played in 95 games for the Pirates, posting a .264/.310/.456 slash line to go along with a career-high 10 home runs and 36 RBI. In 26 games for Pittsburgh in 2020, he hit .205/.244/.397 with 4 home runs and 11 RBI. On November 20, 2020, Osuna was designated for assignment. He was released by the organization on November 23.

=== Tokyo Yakult Swallows ===
On November 26, 2020, Osuna announced on Instagram that he had signed with the Tokyo Yakult Swallows of Nippon Professional Baseball. On April 23, 2021, he made his NPB debut. After the 2021 season, Osuna signed a three-year contract extension with the Swallows worth $5.1 million.
