= Yutaro Sugimoto =

Japanese baseball player (born 1991)

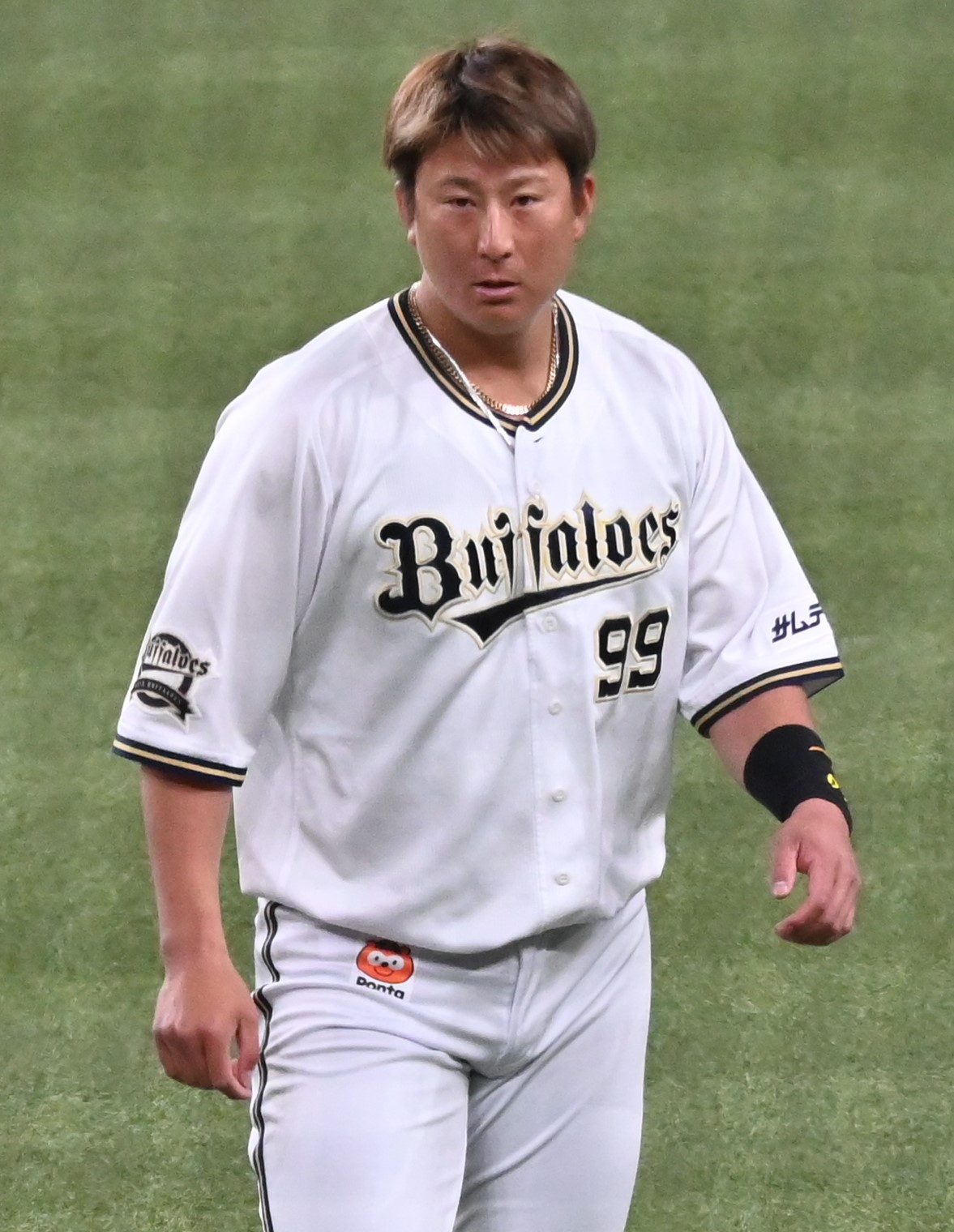

Orix Buffaloes – No. 99
- Outfielder
- Born: April 5, 1991 (age 35); Anan, Tokushima, Japan
- Bats: Right Throws: Right

NPB debut
- June 14, 2016, for the Orix Buffaloes

NPB statistics (through April 5, 2022)
- Batting average: .272
- Home runs: 42
- RBIs: 121
- Stats at Baseball Reference

Teams
- Orix Buffaloes (2016–present)

Career highlights and awards
- 2x NPB All-Star (2021, 2023); Pacific League Leader of Home Run (2021); Pacific League Best Nine Award (2021); Interleague play PL Nippon Life Award Winner (2022); Japan Series champion (2022); Japan Series MVP (2022)

Yutaro Sugimoto (杉本 裕太郎, Sugimoto Yutaro; born April 5, 1991 in Anan, Tokushima, Japan), nicknamed "Raoh", is a professional Japanese baseball player. He plays outfielder for the Orix Buffaloes.

Sugimoto won the Japan Series Most Valuable Player Award for the 2022 Japan Series. His nickname is derived from the fact he is a fan of said character from the manga Fist of the North Star. Since 2021, when he first used it as a nickname on the back of a Buffaloes jersey, he had done the "ascension pose" after hitting a home run.
