= Hiroya Miyagi =

Japanese baseball player (born 2001)

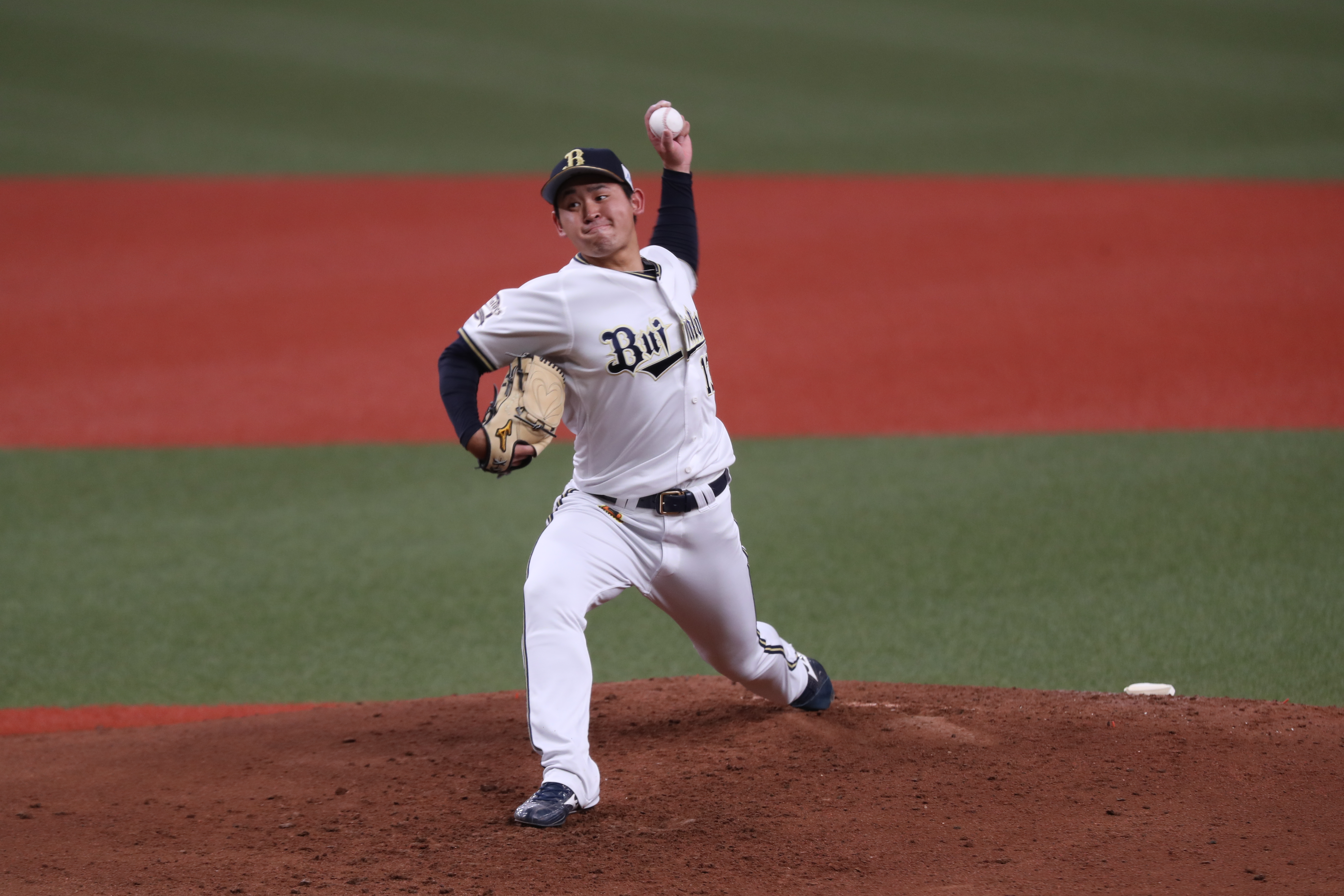
- Miyagi with the Orix Buffaloes

Orix Buffaloes – No. 18
- Pitcher
- Born: August 25, 2001 (age 24); Ginowan, Okinawa, Japan
- Bats: Left Throws: Left

NPB debut
- October 4, 2020, for the Orix Buffaloes

NPB statistics (through 2025 season)
- Win–loss record: 46–29
- Earned run average: 2.48
- Strikeouts: 700
- Stats at Baseball Reference

Teams
- Orix Buffaloes (2020–present)

Career highlights and awards
- 2x NPB All-Star (2021, 2025); Pacific League Rookie of the Year (2021); Japan Series champion (2022)
Medals
Men's baseball
Representing Japan
World Baseball Classic
Gold medal – first place	2023 Miami	Team

Hiroya Miyagi (宮城 大弥, Miyagi Hiroya; born August 25, 2001) is a Japanese professional baseball pitcher for the Orix Buffaloes of Nippon Professional Baseball (NPB).

== Professional career ==
In 2021, after posting a 13-4 record and 131 strikeouts in 147.2 innings pitched, Miyagi won the NPB Pacific League Rookie of the year award and was named an NPB All-Star for the first time. His 2.51 ERA was second in the Pacific League only to his teammate, Yoshinobu Yamamoto.
