= 2023 Japan Series =

74th edition of Nippon Professional Baseball's championship series

Team (Wins)	Managers	Season
Hanshin Tigers (4)	Akinobu Okada	85–53–5 (.616), 11½ GA
Orix Buffaloes (3)	Satoshi Nakajima	86–53–4 (.619), 15½ GA
- Dates: October 28 – November 5, 2023
- Venue(s): Kyocera Dome Osaka (Orix); Koshien Stadium (Hanshin)
- MVP: Kōji Chikamoto (Hanshin)
- FSA: Kotaro Kurebayashi (Orix)

Broadcast
- Television: FNN (Games 1 & 7); NHK-BS1 (Games 1, 2, 3, & 5); TXN (Game 2); JNN (Games 3 & 6); NNN (Game 4); ANN (Game 5); TVer (All Games, live streaming)
- Radio: NHK Radio 1 ABC Radio; MBS

The 2023 Japan Series (日本シリーズ, Nippon Shiriizu) was the championship series of Nippon Professional Baseball's (NPB) 2023 season. The 74th edition of the Japan Series, it was a best-of-seven playoff between the winners of the Central League (CL) and Pacific League's (PL) postseason tournament, the Climax Series. The Hanshin Tigers and Orix Buffaloes each won their respective CL and PL titles in the regular season, which advanced both teams directly to the final stages of the Climax Series; each then earned Japan Series berths by winning their respective CL and PL Climax Series.

The Tigers and the Buffaloes both play in Japan's Kansai region, which made it only the second time that two Kansai-based teams played each other in the Japan Series, the other being in 1964. Because of the teams' close proximity, the series was dubbed "The Great Kansai Derby" and the "Namba Line Series" by Japanese media. While Orix won the previous year's championship, the last title for the Tigers came 38 years prior in 1985, then the second-longest active championship drought in NPB. Starting on October 28, 2023, and ending on November 5, 2023, Hanshin won the series in seven games, thus ending their championship drought and the Curse of the Colonel, a superstition that was believed by some to be responsible for the team's struggles. Koji Chikamoto was named the series' Most Valuable Player and Kotaro Kurebayashi won the Fighting Spirit Award as Orix's best player in the series.

== Background ==
The Hanshin Tigers won their eleventh-straight game on September 14, capping off their longest win streak of the season. The win also clinched the team their first Central League (CL) pennant since 2005 and their sixth overall. Hanshin finished the previous season in third place with a losing record. Manager Akihiro Yano stepped down at the end of the year and Akinobu Okada, a Tigers player during the team's only championship in 1985, was brought back a second time to again manage the team. After back-to-back seven- and nine-game win streaks from May 11 to 30, the Tigers maintained first place for the remainder of the season. In July, Shintaro Yokota, a former Tigers player that was forced to retire in 2019 because of brain cancer, died. Yokota was a former teammate of several current players, including Suguru Iwazaki, who carried his uniform on the field and held it during the pennant celebration. League winners for the first time since 2005, the Tigers advanced directly to the CL Climax Series' final stage where they played the Hiroshima Toyo Carp. With the help of the one-win advantage the winners of the pennant receive, Hanshin swept the Carp in three games to advance to the Japan Series for the first time since 2014.

Six days after the Tigers clinched their title, the Orix Buffaloes secured their third-straight and 15th overall Pacific League (PL) pennant. Despite slugging outfielder Masataka Yoshida leaving the team in the offseason to play in Major League Baseball (MLB), Orix was still able to lead in the standings throughout the majority of the season and clinched the title relatively early compared to the previous two seasons. It was the Buffaloes third three-peat in its history, its first since 1975–1978 when they won four straight as the Braves. It was the first three consecutive Pacific League championships since the Seibu Lions won five straight between 1990 and 1994. Orix advanced directly to the PL Climax Series' final stage where they played the Chiba Lotte Marines for the right to move on to the Japan Series. The Buffaloes defeated the Marines four games to one, including their one-win advantage. It was their third straight Japan Series appearance.

First Stage
Central League
2	Hiroshima Toyo Carp	2
3	Yokohama DeNA BayStars	0
Pacific League
2	Chiba Lotte Marines	2
3	Fukuoka SoftBank Hawks	1

Final Stage
1	Hanshin Tigers	4
2	Hiroshima Toyo Carp	0
1	Orix Buffaloes	4
2	Chiba Lotte Marines	1

Japan Series
CL1	Hanshin Tigers	4
PL1	Orix Buffaloes	3

== Series notes ==
Koshien Stadium (top left) and Kyocera Dome Osaka are located 12 kilometres (7.5 mi) apart.

The Hanshin Tigers' and the Orix Buffaloes' home stadiums are Koshien Stadium and Kyocera Dome, respectively. The stadiums' respective cities, Nishinomiya and Osaka, both fall within Japan's Kansai region and are just over twenty minutes apart via train. Because of the close proximity, the series was dubbed "The Great Kansai Derby" and the "Namba Line Series" for the train line that helps connect the two stadiums, the Namba Line. This Japan Series was only the second time that two Kansai-based teams have played each other, the other being the 1964 Japan Series when the Nankai Hawks defeated the Tigers 4–3. Despite Orix's recent success, Hanshin has a much larger cultural presence. Founded in 1935, the Tigers were formed during the earliest days of professional baseball in Japan. Additionally, the team plays in historic Koshien Stadium, the oldest stadium in Nippon Professional Baseball (NPB). The team's championship struggles also add to its storied history. Conversely, the Buffaloes were formed from a merger between the Orix BlueWave and the Kintetsu Buffaloes during the contentious 2004 Nippon Professional Baseball realignment. Prior to that the team played in Nishinomiya and Kobe before calling Osaka home after the merger. Economists predicted that the series' economic impact in Japan could surpass the benefits of the Japan national baseball team winning the 2023 World Baseball Classic earlier in the year.

2023 Japan Series managers

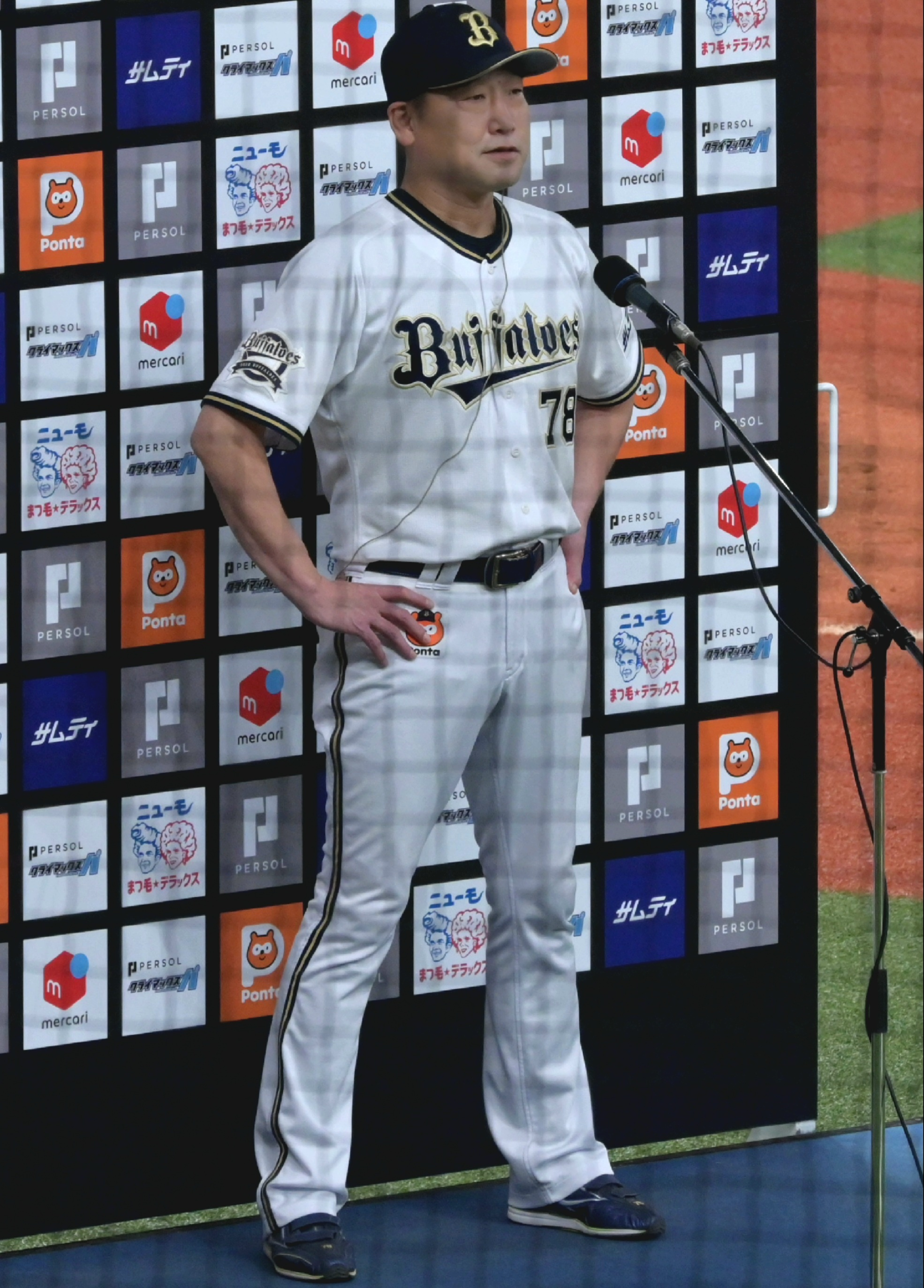
Satoshi Nakajima, Orix

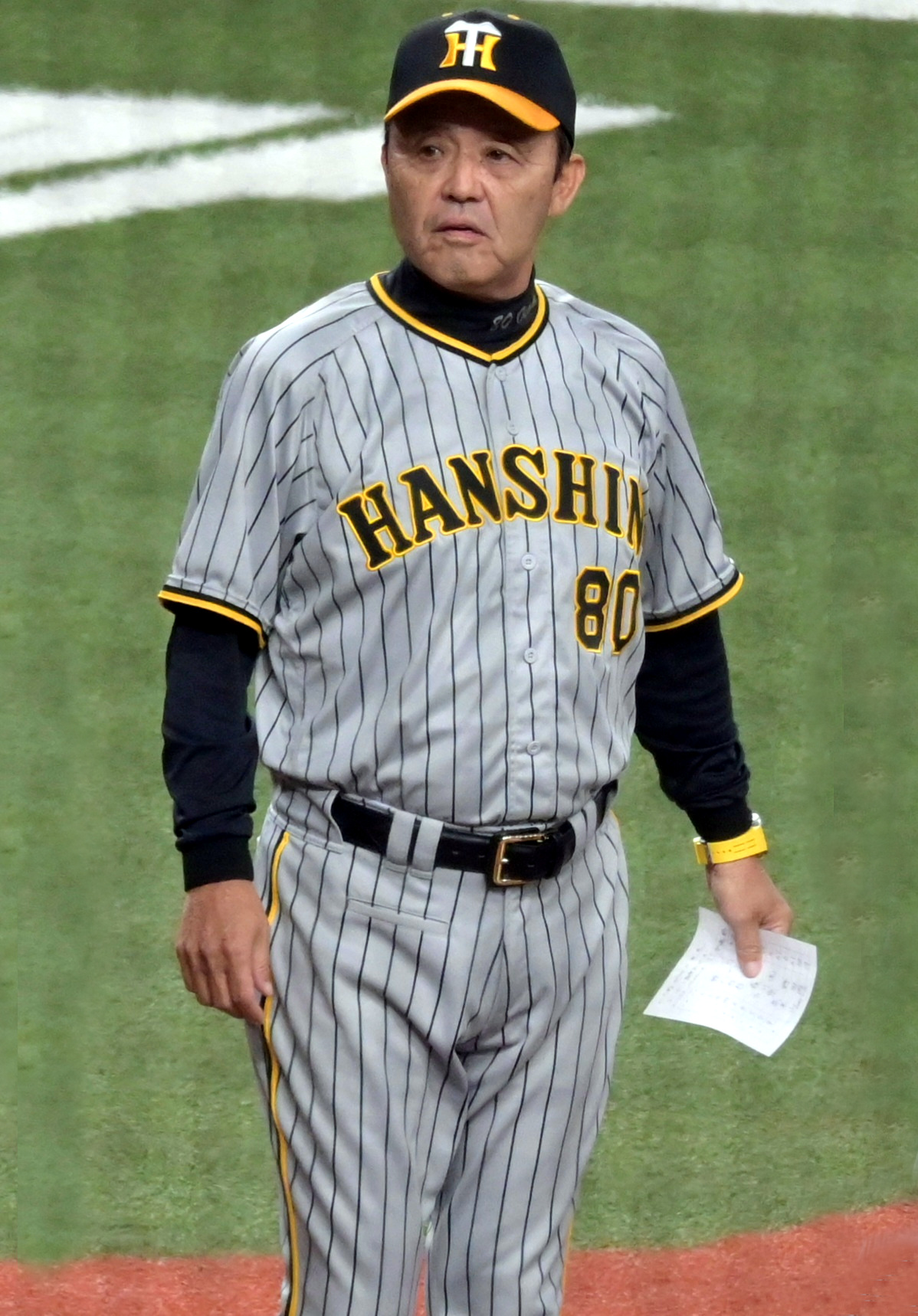
Akinobu Okada, Hanshin

The series was the third straight Japan Series appearance for Orix, losing in 2021 but winning in 2022, their fifth championship. Hanshin, however, entered the series with much less recent Japan Series experience. The team last appeared in a Japan Series in 2014, a series they lost. The last and only time the Tigers won a championship was in 1985. The 38-year-long championship drought was the second longest active drought in NPB, only one year shorter than the Carp's. The series garnered worldwide attention for the Tigers because it could allow them to break the so-called "Curse of the Colonel", a superstition that started in 1985 that was believed by some to be responsible for Hanshin's struggles to win another Japan Series. Tigers manager Okada was a Tigers player during their last title in 1985 and also led the team to a Japan Series berth in 2005 during his first managerial stint with Hanshin, only to be swept by the Marines.

Both teams had similar statistics during the regular season. The Buffaloes and Tigers had the best and second-best records in NPB, respectively, with 86–53–4 and 85–53–5. Similarly, the Hanshin pitching staff's 2.66 team earned run average (ERA) was the NPB best, with the Buffaloes a close second with a 2.73 team ERA. In their only regular season meeting during interleague play in June, Orix won the series 2–1. Home field advantage for the Japan Series alternates between the Pacific and Central leagues every year. For this series, it was the PL's turn to hold the advantage, so home field was awarded to the Buffaloes. The designated hitters were not used in games three, four, and five, played at the Tigers' Koshien Stadium, as the rule has never been adopted in the Central League.

=== Sponsor ===
Sumitomo Mitsui Banking Corporation (SMBC) sponsored the event for the tenth consecutive year and held the naming rights for the series, with its full title being "2023 SMBC Japan Series".

== Summary ==
Hanshin won the series, 4–3.

Game	Date	Score	Location	Time	Attendance
1	October 28	Hanshin Tigers − 8, Orix Buffaloes − 0	Kyocera Dome Osaka	3:20	33,701
2	October 29	Hanshin Tigers − 0, Orix Buffaloes − 8	Kyocera Dome Osaka	3:09	33,584
3	October 31	Orix Buffaloes − 5, Hanshin Tigers − 4	Koshien Stadium	3:51	40,994
4	November 1	Orix Buffaloes − 3, Hanshin Tigers − 4	Koshien Stadium	4:06	41,050
5	November 2	Orix Buffaloes − 2, Hanshin Tigers − 6	Koshien Stadium	3:28	41,031
6	November 4	Hanshin Tigers − 1, Orix Buffaloes − 5	Kyocera Dome Osaka	3:01	33,633
7	November 5	Hanshin Tigers − 7, Orix Buffaloes − 1	Kyocera Dome Osaka	3:10	33,405

== Game summaries ==
=== Game 1 ===
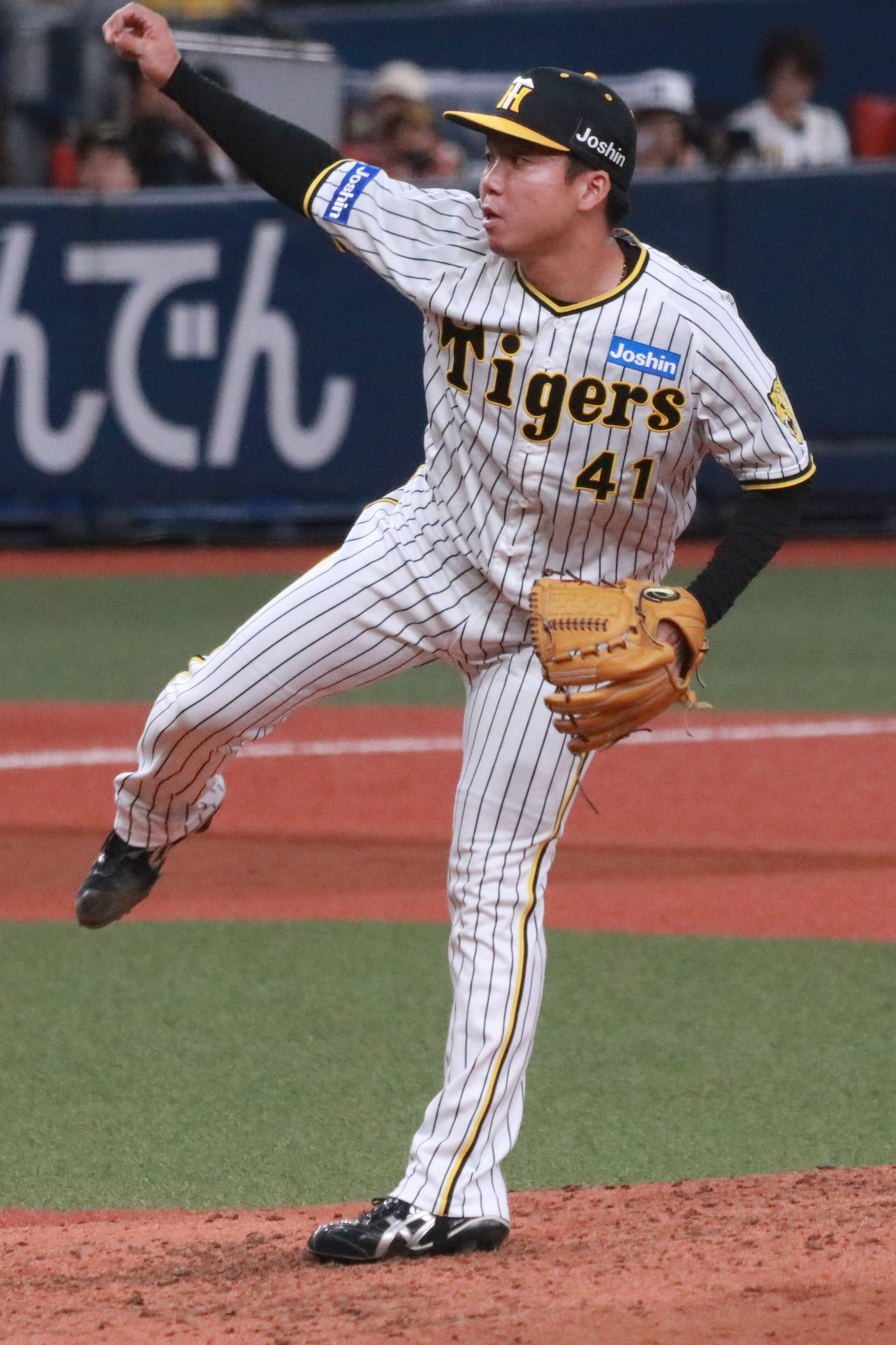
Tigers' starting pitcher Shoki Murakami threw seven shutout innings in Game 1.

Saturday, October 28, 2023, 6:34 pm (JST) at Kyocera Dome Osaka in Osaka, Osaka Prefecture
Team	1	2	3	4	5	6	7	8	9	R	H	E
Hanshin	0	0	0	0	4	3	0	0	1	8	13	0
Orix	0	0	0	0	0	0	0	0	0	0	2	1
WP: Shoki Murakami (1–0) LP: Yoshinobu Yamamoto (0–1); Attendance: 33,701; Boxscore

The Orix Buffaloes Junior Team threw out the ceremonial first pitch. Shoki Murakami was the starting pitcher for Hanshin, while Yoshinobu Yamamoto started for Orix. After four innings of a pitcher's duel, the Tigers' Teruaki Sato singled, stole second base, and advanced to third on a flyout. Ryo Watanabe then hit a run batted in (RBI) single to drive in Hanshin's first run. Watanabe and Seiya Kinami were driven in by Kōji Chikamoto with a two-run triple later in the inning. Takumu Nakano capped off the scoring in the fifth by driving in Chikamoto with a RBI single. The next inning, Hanshin struck again, first when Yusuke Oyama drew a leadoff walk and eventually scored on a RBI single by Kinami. The next batter, Seishirō Sakamoto, immediately hit a double to drive in Kinami and force Orix to make a pitching change. Nakano drove in another run off of Orix relief pitcher Nobuyoshi Yamada before the end of the inning. Yamamoto left the game after 5 2/3 innings, allowing ten hits and giving up seven runs for the first time, a career worst. Meanwhile, Murakami did not permit a baserunner in the first four innings, until allowing a double by Tomoya Mori to start the fifth inning. Murakami allowed no runs and two hits in seven innings to earn the win in Game 1.

=== Game 2 ===
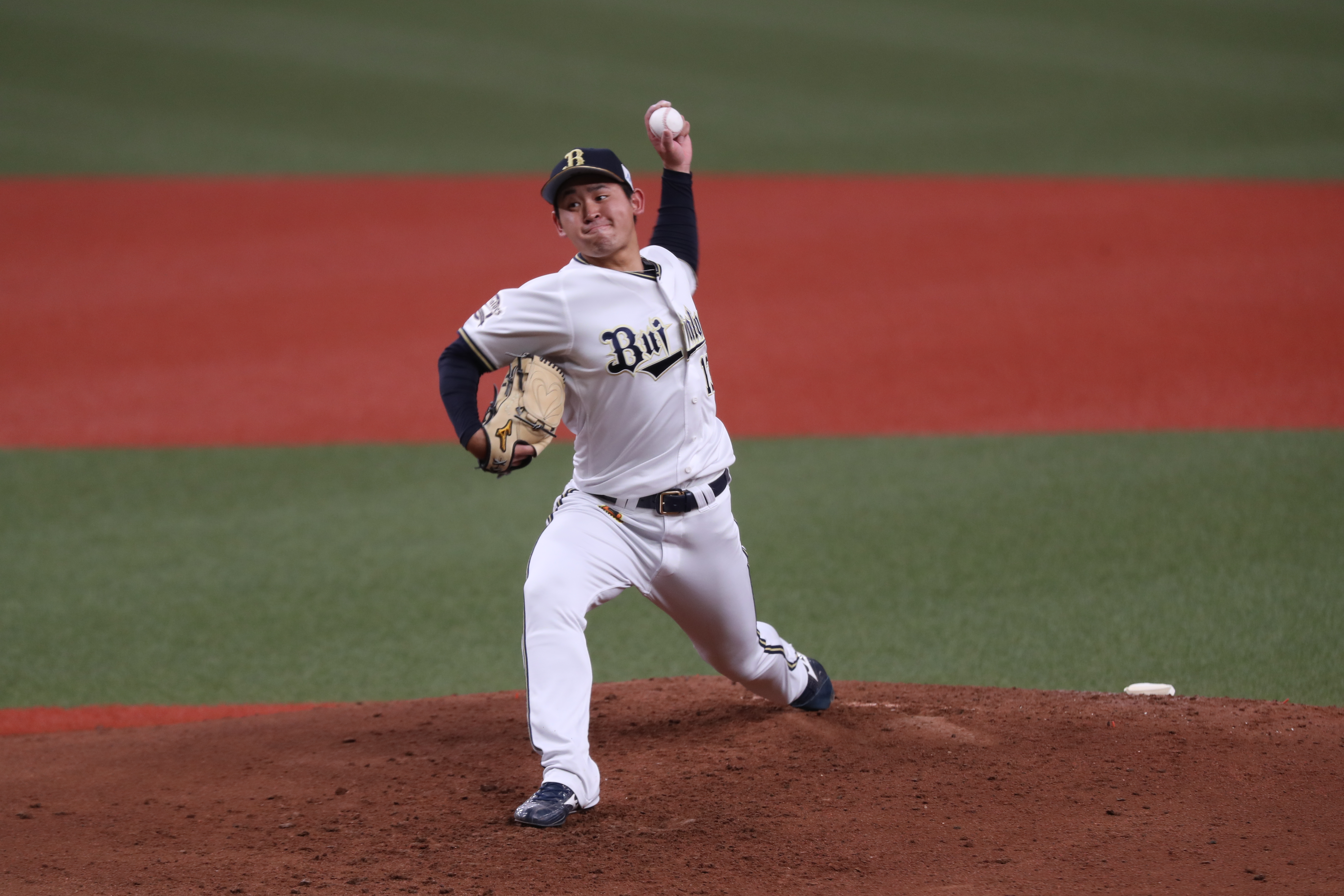
In Game 2, starting pitcher Hiroya Miyagi threw six shutout innings for the Buffaloes.

Sunday, October 29, 2023, 6:33 pm (JST) at Kyocera Dome Osaka in Osaka, Osaka Prefecture
Team	1	2	3	4	5	6	7	8	9	R	H	E
Hanshin	0	0	0	0	0	0	0	0	0	0	4	3
Orix	0	0	1	3	0	0	3	1	X	8	12	0
WP: Hiroya Miyagi (1–0) LP: Yuki Nishi (0–1); Attendance: 33,584; Boxscore

Actress Yuriko Yoshitaka threw out the ceremonial first pitch. Hiroya Miyagi started Game 2 for Orix and Yuki Nishi started for Hanshin. Miyagi pitched six innings without allowing a run, giving up four hits and one walk. Nishi allowed a single to Taishi Hirooka and a RBI triple for Masahiro Nishino in the third inning. The next inning, Orix recorded walk followed by four consecutive singles off of Nishi and he was pulled from the game, allowing four runs in 3 2/3 innings. Marwin González entered the game as a pinch hitter with the bases loaded for Orix in the seventh inning and hit a three run double. The Buffaloes tallied one last run on an error in the eighth. Orix's relief pitchers completed the game without allowing another hit or a run.

=== Game 3 ===
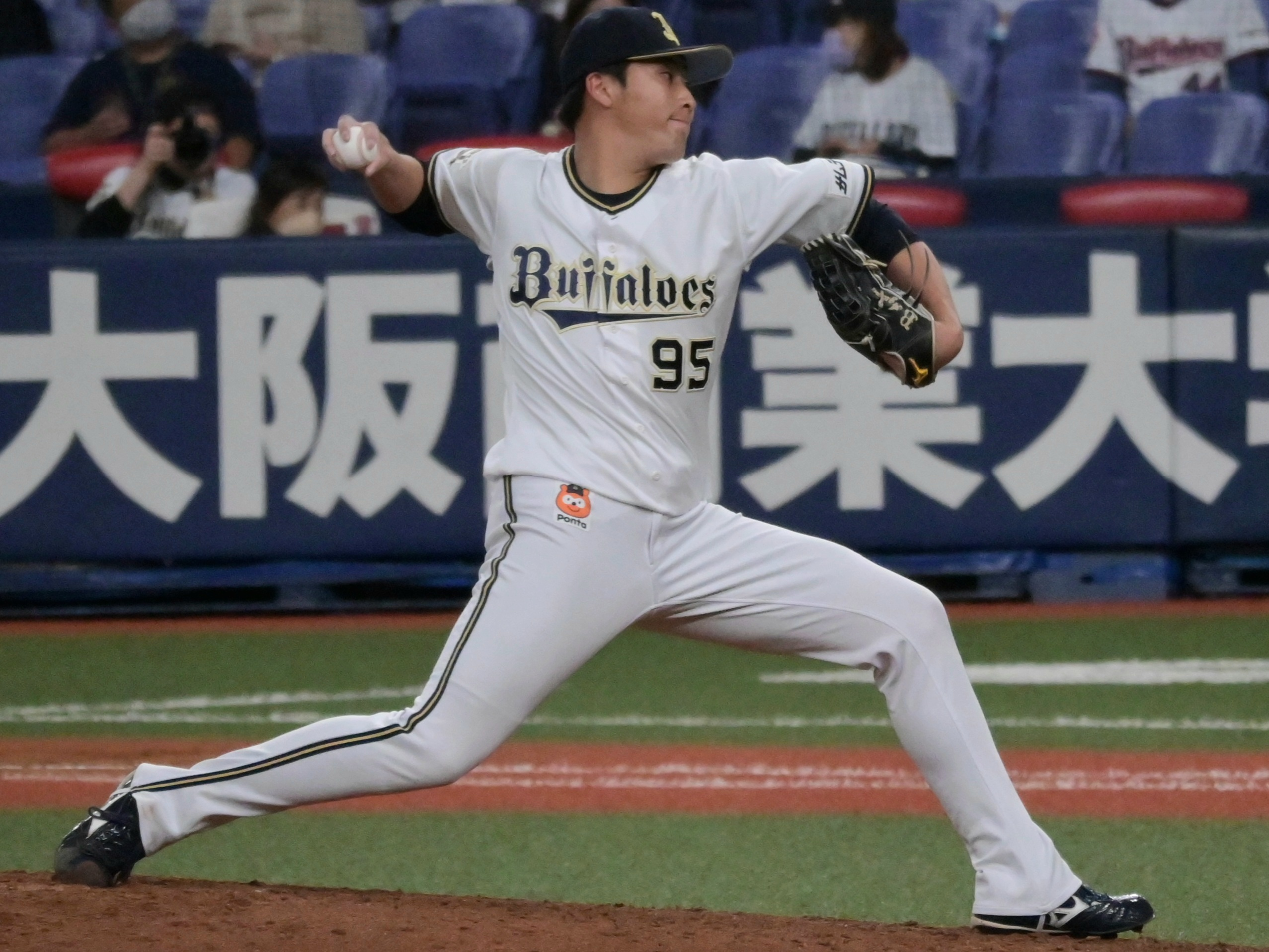
Kohei Azuma gave up one run in six innings in his Game 3 win.

Tuesday, October 31, 2023, 6:03 pm (JST) at Koshien Stadium in Nishinomiya, Hyōgo Prefecture
Team	1	2	3	4	5	6	7	8	9	R	H	E
Orix	0	0	0	1	3	1	0	0	0	5	9	0
Hanshin	0	1	0	0	0	0	3	0	0	4	10	1
WP: Kohei Azuma (1–0) LP: Masashi Ito (0–1) Sv: Yoshihisa Hirano (1); Home runs: ORX: Yuma Tongu (1); HAN: None; Attendance: 40,994; Boxscore

Singer Sayaka Yamamoto performed the Japanese national anthem, "Kimigayo", before Game 3. The Hanshin Tigers Junior Team threw out the ceremonial first pitch. Kohei Azuma started for Orix and Masashi Ito started for Hanshin.

The Tigers opened the scoring in the second inning after Yusuke Oyama singled to start the inning, reached third on single by Sheldon Neuse, and then scored on a Seishiro Sakamoto ground out. Yuma Tongu tied the game for Orix in the fourth inning when he hit a solo home run, the first home run hit by either team in the series. In the fifth inning, the first two Orix batters reached base and then Taishi Hirooka gave the Buffaloes the least when he hit a ground out to shortstop to score Kotaro Kurebayashi. Azuma then bunted to advance Hirooka to second base, but a throwing error by Ito left both runners safe. Yuma Mune then drove both runners in with a two-RBI double to give the Buffaloes a 4–1 lead. A sacrifice fly by Kenya Wakatsuki extended the Buffaloes' lead to 5–1 in the sixth inning.

The Tigers attempted to mount a comeback in the seventh inning against Orix's relief pitchers when they loaded the bases on two hits and a walk. A groundout by Takumu Nakano that drove in one run followed by a two-run single by Shota Morishita brought Hanshin to within one run. Orix then brought in pitcher Yuki Udagawa who was able to close out the inning without allowing another run. The Buffaloes' brought in closer Yoshihisa Hirano to pitch a scoreless ninth inning to earn the save and preserve the win. Azuna allowed one run to Hanshin in six innings pitched. Ito allowed four runs to Orix.

=== Game 4 ===
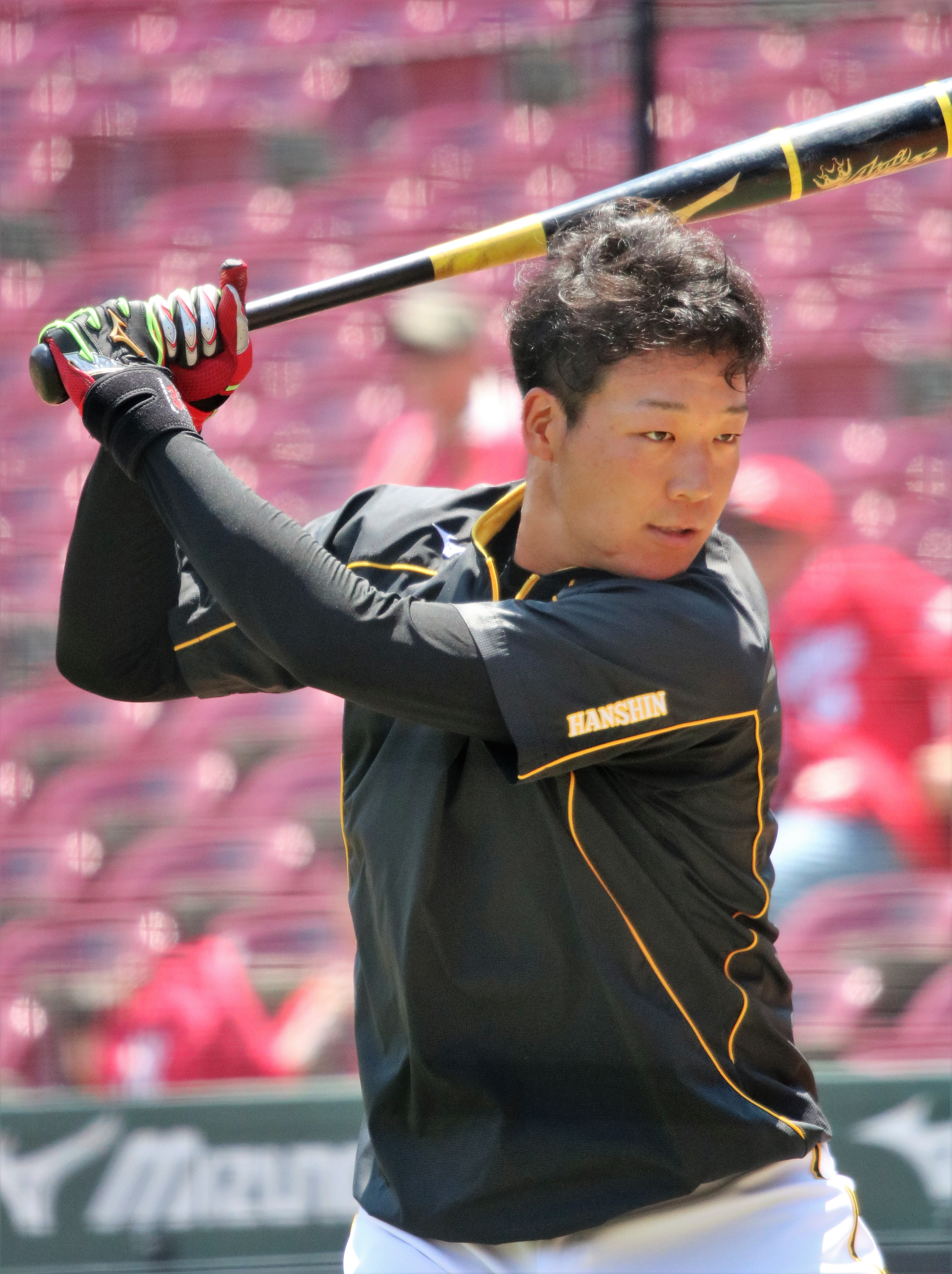
Yusuke Oyama hit a sayonara walk-off RBI single to win Game 4.

Wednesday, November 1, 2023, 6:01 pm (JST) at Koshien Stadium in Nishinomiya, Hyōgo Prefecture
Team	1	2	3	4	5	6	7	8	9	R	H	E
Orix	0	1	0	0	0	0	2	0	0	3	12	3
Hanshin	1	1	0	0	1	0	0	0	1	4	8	1
WP: Suguru Iwazaki (1–0) LP: Jacob Waguespack (0–1); Attendance: 41,050; Boxscore

Rugby player Keita Inagaki threw out the ceremonial first pitch. Sachiya Yamasaki started Game 4 for Orix while Hanshin started Hiroto Saiki. The Tigers took an early lead in the first inning when Koji Chikamoto scored the first run of the game on an RBI double by Shota Morishita. The Buffaloes responded the next inning with a triple by Yuma Tongu, who then scored on a Kotaro Kurebayashi RBI single. In the bottom half of the inning, Hanshin took the lead back. Seiya Kinami hit a two-out single and pitcher Saiki drew a walk. Chikamoto then drove in Kinami with an RBI single. The Tigers added one run to their lead in the fifth inning. Chikamoto started off the inning with his third hit of the night. He then advanced to second when Takumu Nakano reached base on a throwing error by Yamasaki. A fielder's choice by Morishita moved him to third where he was then able to score on another fielders choice by Yusuke Oyama.

In the seventh inning, an error by Hanshin third baseman Teruaki Sato and a pinch-hit single by Leandro Cedeno gave Orix runners on first and second base. Keita Nakagawa moved the runners ahead with a sacrifice bunt and Yuma Mune hit a two-run RBI single to score both and tie the game 3–3. The Buffaloes threatened to take the lead the next inning when Yuya Oda hit a ground ball with runners on second and third with only one out. However, Kento Itohara fielded the ball and threw it to Tigers catcher Seishiro Sakamoto to tag the runner out at home plate. In the bottom of the ninth inning, Hanshin's Chikamoto walked and then made it to third base on two wild pitches thrown by Buffaloes reliever Jacob Waguespack against Nakano. The Buffaloes then intentionally walked Nakano and Morishita to load the bases. Yusuke Oyama then hit a walk-off RBI single to win the game for Hanshin 4–3.

=== Game 5 ===
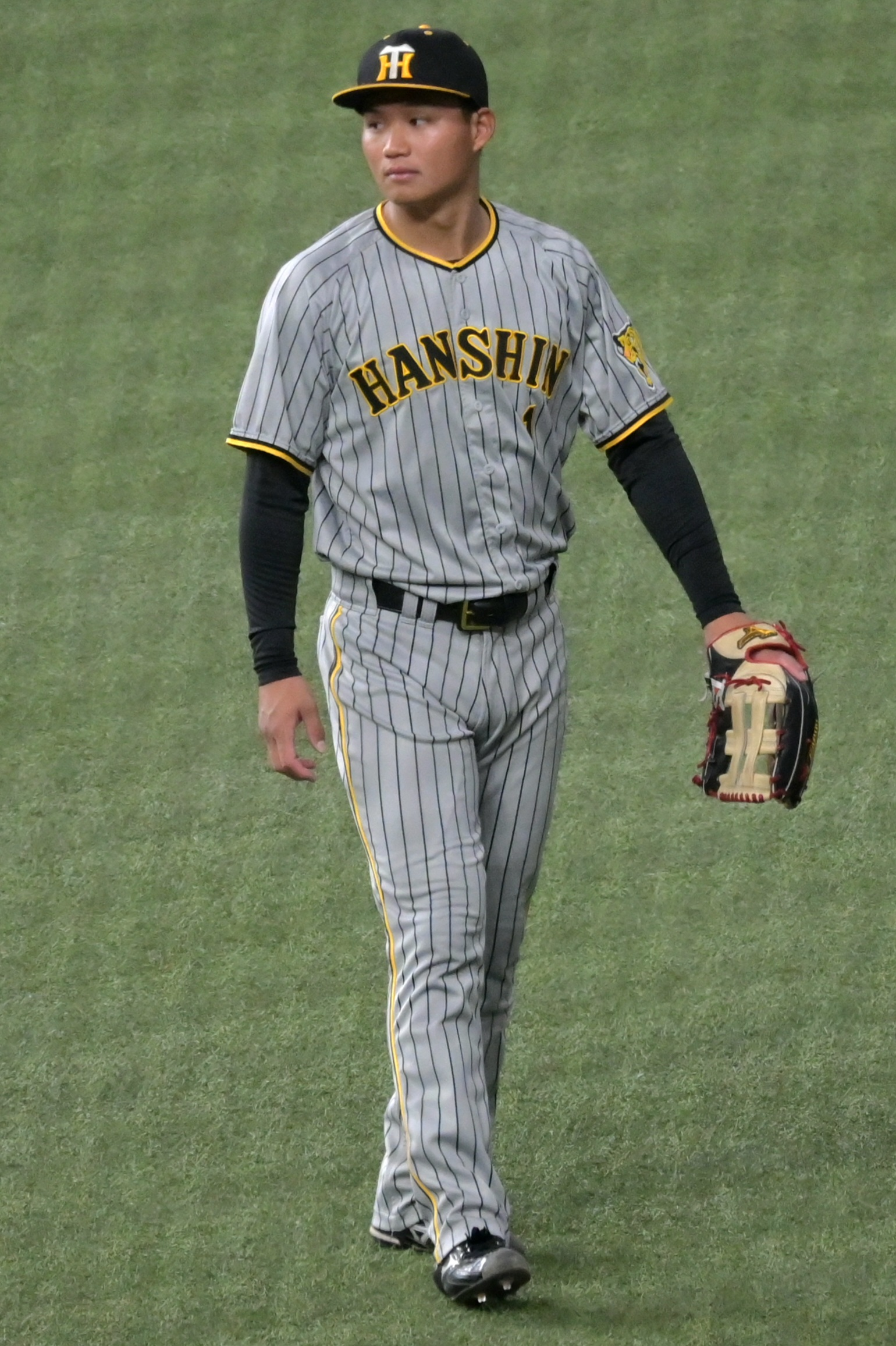
After a costly error, Shota Morishita hit a go-ahead, two-run triple in Game 5.

Thursday, November 2, 2023, 6:03 pm (JST) at Koshien Stadium in Nishinomiya, Hyōgo Prefecture
Team	1	2	3	4	5	6	7	8	9	R	H	E
Orix	0	0	0	1	0	0	1	0	0	2	7	2
Hanshin	0	0	0	0	0	0	0	6	X	6	10	3
WP: Atsuki Yuasa (1–0) LP: Soichiro Yamazaki (0–1); Home runs: ORX: Marwin González (1); HAN: None; Attendance: 41,031; Boxscore

Kotaro Otake started Game 5 for Hanshin. He pitched three scoreless innings before allowing Marwin González to hit a solo home run in the fourth inning to give Orix the lead. González became the fifth player ever to hit a home run in both the World Series and the Japan Series. The Buffaloes added another run to their lead in the seventh. Orix starting pitcher Daiki Tajima walked to start the inning and was eventually replaced on first by Yuma Mune after a fielder's choice. Mune then came around to score on a ground ball by Tomoya Mori that was misplayed by both Takumu Nakano and Shota Morishita on the same play to give Orix a 2–0 lead.

Tajima pitched seven scoreless innings as the Buffaloes starter before reliever Soichiro Yamazaki came in to pitch in eighth inning. Seiya Kinami doubled off of Yamazaki to start the inning and advanced to third base on a single by Kento Itohara. Koji Chikamoto drove in the Tigers' first run with an RBI single and Nakano sacrifice bunted to advance the two baserunners to second and third. Orix then brought in reliever Yuki Udagawa for the fourth straight game to stop the rally. Udagawa had yet to allow a run all postseason, however Morishita hit a go-ahead, two-run triple off of him that put the Tigers ahead 3–2 and Yusuke Oyama drove in one more run before Orix made another pitching change. A two-run triple by Seishiro Sakamoto capped off a six-run eighth inning for Hanshin, enough to give them the Game 5 win.

=== Game 6 ===
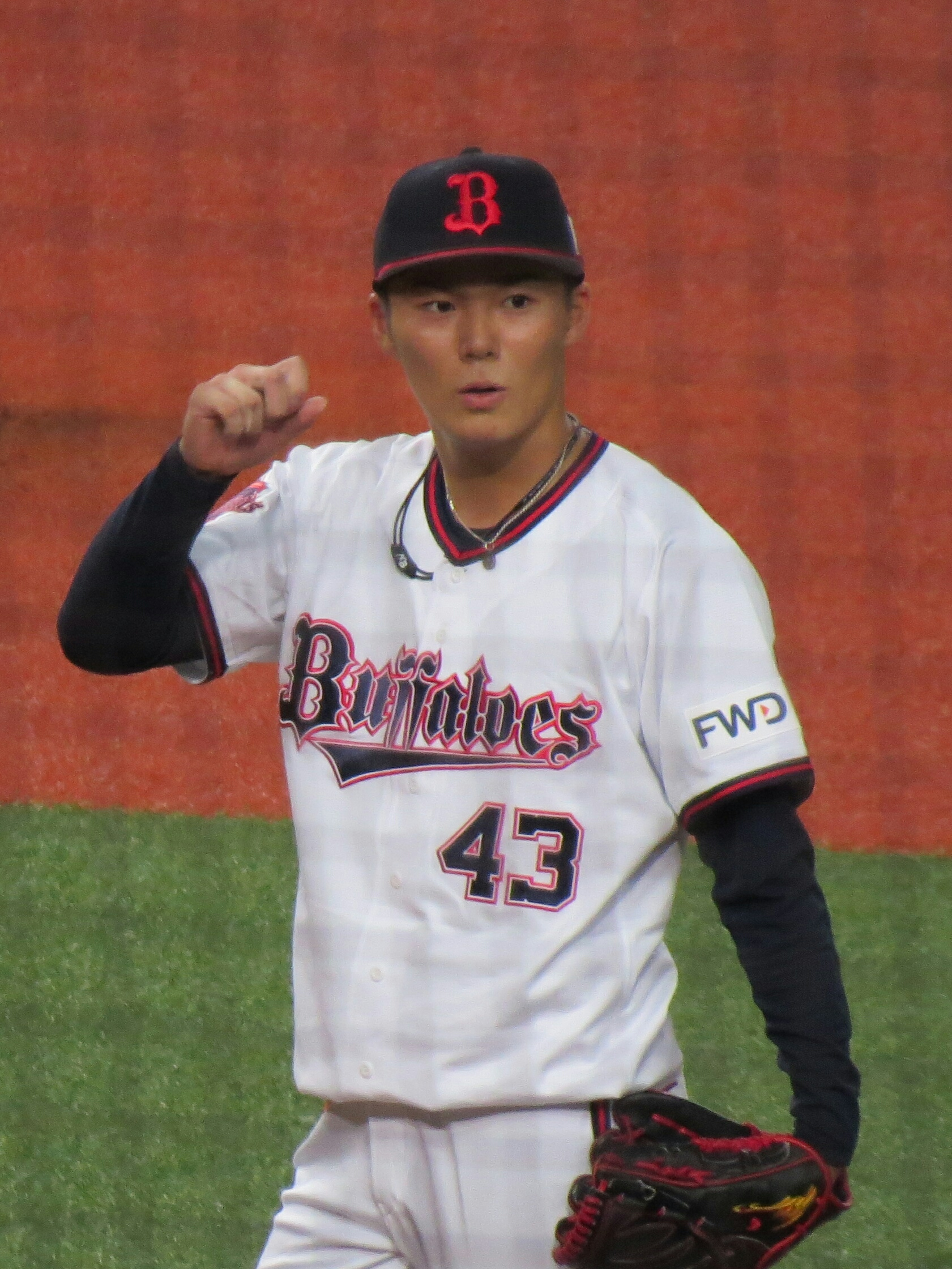
Yoshinobu Yamamoto threw a complete game in Game 6 win.

Saturday, November 4, 2023, 6:33 pm (JST) at Kyocera Dome Osaka in Osaka, Osaka Prefecture
Team	1	2	3	4	5	6	7	8	9	R	H	E
Hanshin	0	1	0	0	0	0	0	0	0	1	9	0
Orix	0	2	0	0	2	0	0	1	X	5	8	0
WP: Yoshinobu Yamamoto (1–1) LP: Shoki Murakami (1–1); Home runs: HAN: Sheldon Neuse (1); ORX: Kotaro Kurebayashi (1), Yuma Tongu (2); Attendance: 33,633; Boxscore

Game 6 was a rematch of Game 1, with Yoshinobu Yamamoto starting for Orix and Shoki Murakami starting for Hanshin. After the worst game of his career in Game 1, Yoshinobu Yamamoto threw 138 pitches in a complete game for Orix, striking out 14 Tigers. He set a record for strikeouts in a Japan Series game, previously shared by Kimiyasu Kudo and Yu Darvish at 13. The only run he allowed came via Sheldon Neuse's solo home run in the second inning, Hanshin's first home run of the series. It would also be the first time since 2003 that the Tigers hit a home run in the Japan Series. Later that same inning, the Tigers loaded the bases before Yamamoto struck out Koji Chikamoto to minimize the damage. Orix responded in the bottom half of the inning with a Marwin González single to lead off, followed by Yutaro Sugimoto's ground-rule double fly ball that struck the Kyocera Dome's ceiling. Kenya Wakatsuki then tied the game with a one-out single to right, and Keita Nakagawa gave the Buffaloes a 2–1 with a sacrifice fly. Though they would prove to be unneeded, Kotaro Kurebayashi's two-run home run in the fifth inning and Yuma Tongu's solo home run in the eighth pushed the final score to 5–1 to give Yamamoto his first Japan Series win, and what would inevitably be his last NPB win before being posted to the Los Angeles Dodgers following the series. (see Aftermath below)

=== Game 7 ===
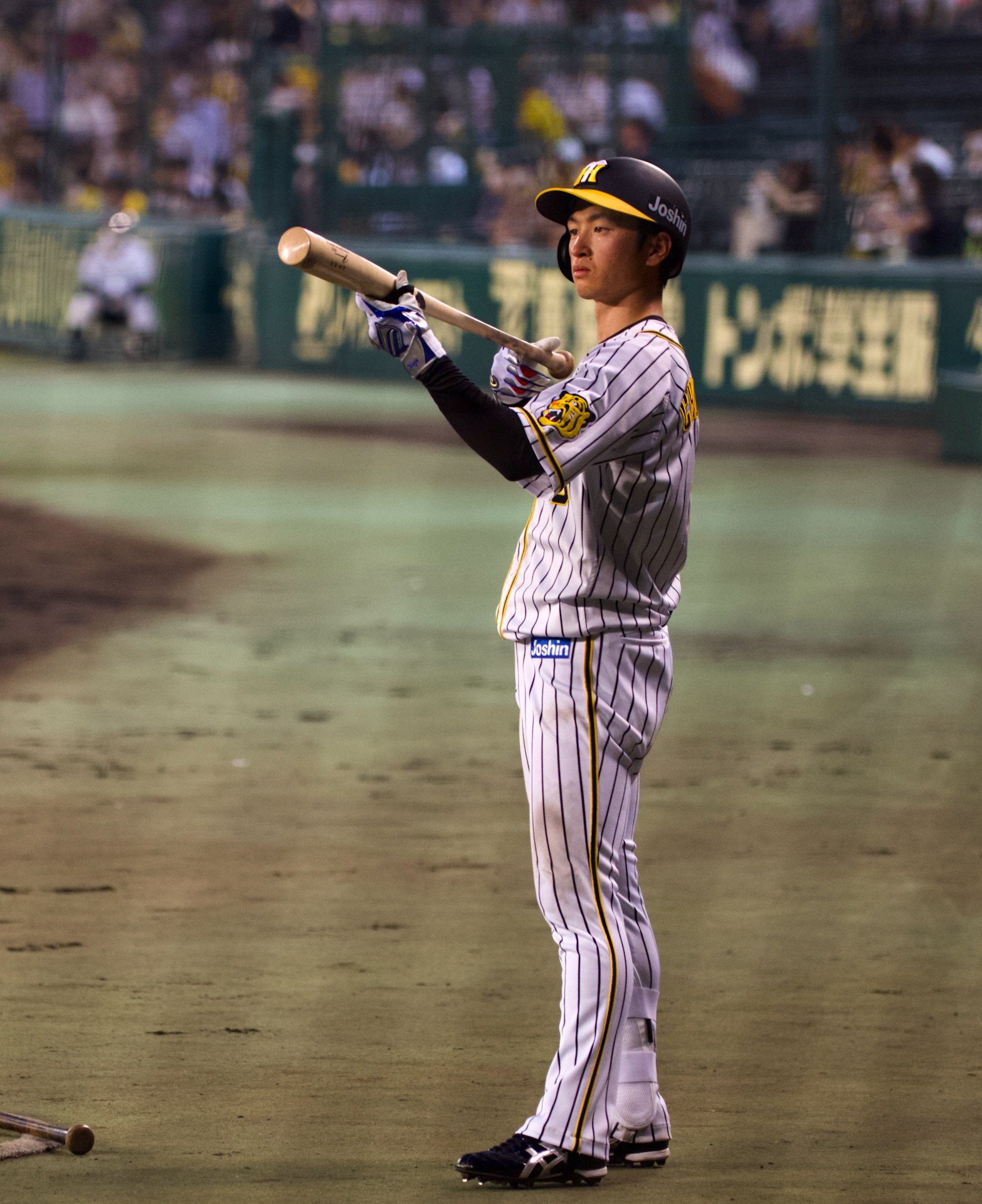
Kōji Chikamoto won the Japan Series Most Valuable Player Award.

Sunday, November 5, 2023, 6:34 pm (JST) at Kyocera Dome Osaka in Osaka, Osaka Prefecture
Team	1	2	3	4	5	6	7	8	9	R	H	E
Hanshin	0	0	0	3	3	0	0	0	1	7	12	0
Orix	0	0	0	0	0	0	0	0	1	1	8	1
WP: Masashi Ito (1–1) LP: Hiroya Miyagi (1–1); Home runs: HAN: Sheldon Neuse (2); ORX: Yuma Tongu (3); Attendance: 33,405; Boxscore

Miyagi started Game 7 for Orix and Kōyō Aoyagi started for Hanshin. While the game was played in the Kyocera Dome, Hanshin held a live watch party in Koshien Stadium attended by 12,424 fans. Neuse hit a three-run home run for Hanshin off of Miyagi in the fourth inning. Hanshin scored three more runs in the fifth inning, with three consecutive RBI singles. Aoyagi pitched 4 2/3 scoreless innings for the Tigers before Game 3 starter Ito entered the game for the Tigers and pitched three scoreless innings in relief. Tongu scored Orix's only run in the ninth inning with a home run off of Suguru Iwazaki, Hanshin's closer.

Kōji Chikamoto had 14 hits in the series and won the Japan Series Most Valuable Player Award, while Kotaro Kurebayashi won the Fighting Spirit Award for being Orix's best player in the Japan Series in their losing effort. Tigers players again carried Yokota's jersey onto the field in his honor during post-game celebrations.

== Aftermath ==
The Hanshin Tigers' win ended a 38-year gap between Japan Series championships. The drought is the third longest in NPB history, behind the 53 years by the Chunichi Dragons until they won in 2007 and the 44 years by the Hokkaido Nippon-Ham Fighters until they won in 2006. During celebrations in Dōtonbori in downtown Osaka after Hanshin won the CL pennant in 1985, Tigers fans stole a statue of Colonel Sanders from outside a nearby KFC restaurant and threw it in the Dōtonbori River. The act is the origin of the Curse of the Colonel, a superstition that is believed by some to be responsible for Hanshin's struggles to win a Japan Series ever since. Fans again gathered and celebrated in Dōtonbori after the 2023 title win and threw a fan cosplaying as the Colonel into the river in reference to the curse. A few months after winning, however, on March 19, 2024, KFC Japan announced they would dispose of the statue, citing the company's difficulty in maintaining the statue, due to its rapidly deteriorating state, despite its connection in Japanese baseball lore.

Immediately after the game, Orix officially confirmed that it would grant Yamamoto's request to be posted to MLB in the offseason. Yamamoto's posting and eventual signing with MLB's Los Angeles Dodgers meant the Buffaloes lost the league's best pitcher.

== See also ==
- 2023 Korean Series
- 2023 World Series
