= 2023 Central League Climax Series =

First stage
Team (Wins)		Manager	Season
Hiroshima Toyo Carp (2)		Takahiro Arai	74–65–4 (.532), 11.5 GB
Yokohama DeNA BayStars (0)		Daisuke Miura	74–66–3 (.529), 12 GB
- Dates: October 14–15
- Television: TBS Channel 2 (CS/BS)
- Radio: Nippon Broadcasting System

Final stage
Team (Wins)		Manager	Season
Hanshin Tigers (4)		Akinobu Okada	85–53–5 (.616), 11.5 GA
Hiroshima Toyo Carp (0)		Takahiro Arai	74–65–4 (.532), 11.5 GB
- Dates: October 18–20
- MVP: Seiya Kinami (Hanshin)
- Television: Fuji TV ONE; Fuji Network (BS, Game 1); TV Asahi (BS, Game 2)
- Radio: Nippon Broadcasting System

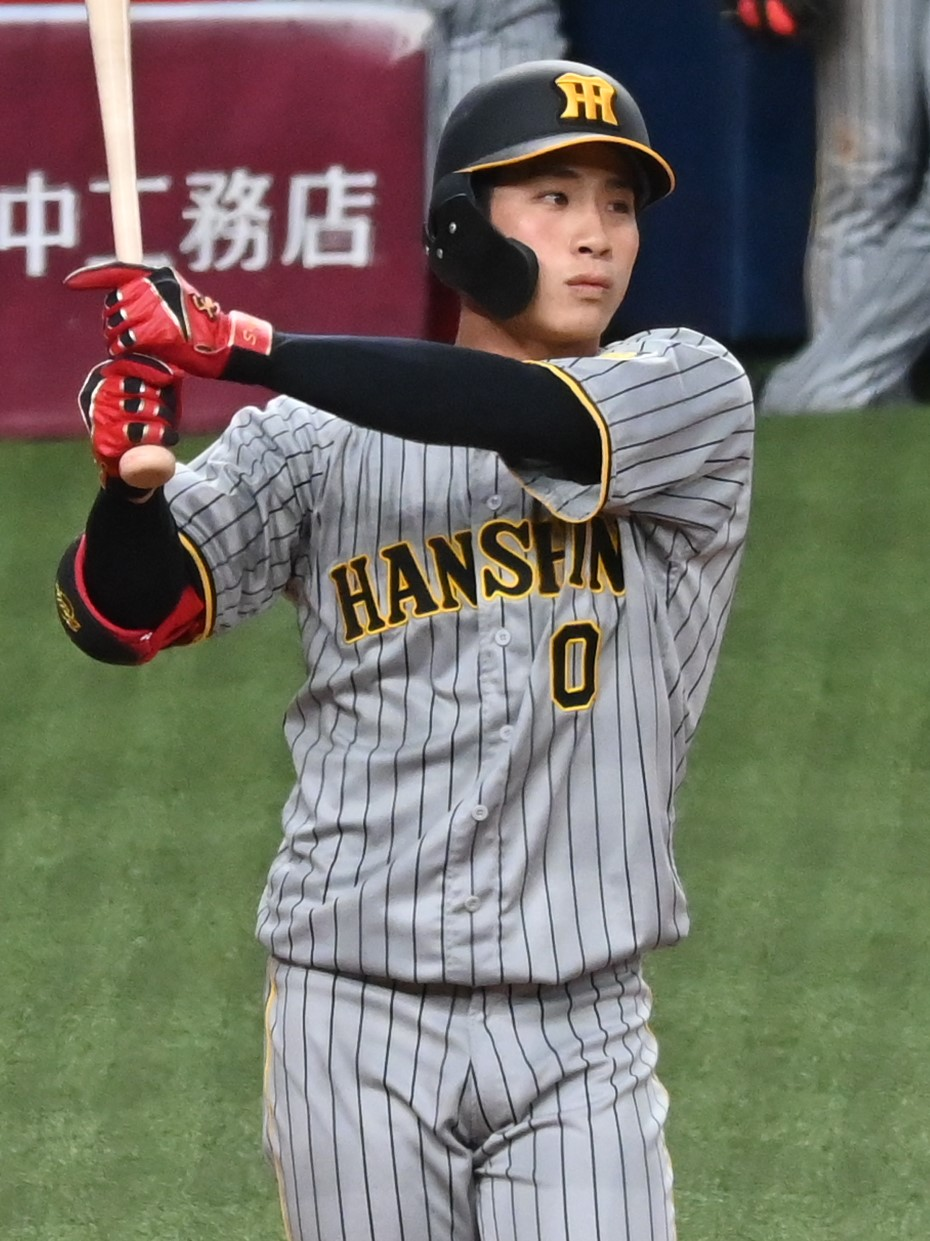

The 2023 Central League Climax Series (CLCS) was a set of two consecutive playoff series in Nippon Professional Baseball (NPB). The first stage began on October 14 and the final stage concluded by October 23. The first stage was a best-of-three series between the second-place Hiroshima Toyo Carp and the third-place Yokohama DeNA BayStars. The final stage was a best-of-six with the Hanshin Tigers, the Central League champion, being awarded a one-win advantage against the Hiroshima Toyo Carp, the winner of the first stage. The Tigers advanced to the 2023 Japan Series to compete against the Orix Buffaloes, the 2023 Pacific League Climax Series winner.

== First stage ==
Intra-league teams play 25 games against each other during the regular season. The Carp and the BayStars split the season series 14–10–1, in favor of the Carp. The two teams had met in the postseason twice prior to this year, with each team winning one series apiece (Carp winning the final stage of the 2016 CLCS and Baystars winning the final stage of the 2017 CLCS).

=== Summary ===
Hiroshima Toyo Carp won the series, 2–0.

Game	Date	Score	Location	Time	Attendance
1	October 14	Yokohama DeNA BayStars – 2, Hiroshima Toyo Carp – 3 (11)	Mazda Stadium	3:52	31,041
2	October 15	Yokohama DeNA BayStars – 2, Hiroshima Toyo Carp – 4	Mazda Stadium	3:32	31,059

=== Game 1 ===
Saturday, October 14, 2023, 1:00 pm (JST) at Mazda Stadium in Hiroshima, Hiroshima Prefecture
Team	1	2	3	4	5	6	7	8	9	10	11	R	H	E
DeNA	0	0	0	0	0	2	0	0	0	0	0	2	12	0
Hiroshima	0	0	0	0	0	1	0	1	0	0	1X	3	9	0
WP: Nik Turley (1–0) LP: J. B. Wendelken (0–1); Home runs: DNA: Toshiro Miyazaki (1); HIR: None; Attendance: 31,041; Boxscore

=== Game 2 ===
Sunday, October 15, 2023 1:01 pm (JST) at Mazda Stadium in Hiroshima, Hiroshima Prefecture
Team	1	2	3	4	5	6	7	8	9	R	H	E
DeNA	0	0	0	0	0	0	2	0	0	2	7	0
Hiroshima	1	0	0	0	0	1	0	2	X	4	7	0
WP: Sotaro Shimauchi (1–0) LP: Taiga Kamichatani (0–1) Sv: Ryoji Kuribayashi (1); Home runs: DNA: None; HIR: Ryoma Nishikawa (1), Shota Suekane (1); Attendance: 31,059; Boxscore

== Final stage ==
The championship advanced the Tigers directly to the final stage of the Climax Series to host the Carp, the eventual winner of the first stage. In the season series, Hanshin came out on top 15–9–1 and finished 11.5 games ahead of Hiroshima. The series is the third time the two teams have met in the Climax Series, with their previous two meetings being a series win for each team.

=== Summary ===
Hanshin Tigers won the series, 4-0*.

Game	Date	Score	Location	Time	Attendance
1	October 18	Hiroshima Toyo Carp – 1, Hanshin Tigers – 4	Koshien Stadium	2:52	42,641
2	October 19	Hiroshima Toyo Carp – 1, Hanshin Tigers – 2	Koshien Stadium	3:13	42,630
3	October 20	Hiroshima Toyo Carp – 2, Hanshin Tigers – 4	Koshien Stadium	3:41	42,642

* The Central League regular season champion is given a one-game advantage in the final stage.

=== Game 1 ===
Wednesday, October 18, 2023, 1:00 pm JST at Koshien Stadium in Nishinomiya, Hyōgo Prefecture
Team	1	2	3	4	5	6	7	8	9	R	H	E
Hiroshima	0	0	0	1	0	0	0	0	0	1	4	0
Hanshin	0	0	0	1	3	0	0	0	X	4	5	0
WP: Shoki Murakami (1–0) LP: Aren Kuri (0–1) Sv: Suguru Iwazaki (1); Home runs: HIR: None; HAN: Shōta Morishita (1); Attendance: 42,641; Boxscore

=== Game 2 ===
Thursday, October 19, 2023, 6:01 pm JST at Koshien Stadium in Nishinomiya, Hyōgo Prefecture
Team	1	2	3	4	5	6	7	8	9	R	H	E
Hiroshima	1	0	0	0	0	0	0	0	0	1	7	1
Hanshin	0	1	0	0	0	0	0	0	1X	2	5	0
WP: Suguru Iwazaki (1–0) LP: Ryoji Kuribayashi (0–1); Attendance: 42,630; Boxscore

=== Game 3 ===
Friday, October 20, 2023, 6:00 pm JST at Koshien Stadium in Nishinomiya, Hyōgo Prefecture
Team	1	2	3	4	5	6	7	8	9	R	H	E
Hiroshima	0	0	0	1	1	0	0	0	0	2	10	0
Hanshin	0	0	0	2	0	1	1	0	X	4	7	1
WP: Takuma Kirishiki (1–0) LP: Hiroki Tokoda (0–1) Sv: Suguru Iwazaki (2); Attendance: 42,642; Boxscore
