= Takumu =

- Gender: Male

Origin
- Origin: Japanese
- Meaning: Different meanings depending on the kanji used

Takumu (written: 拓夢) is a masculine Japanese given name. Notable people with the name include:

- Takumu Fujinuma (藤沼 拓夢; born 1997), Japanese footballer
- Takumu Kawamura (川村 拓夢; born 1999), Japanese footballer
- Takumu Nakano (中野 拓夢; born 1996), Japanese baseball infielder
- Takumu Nishihara (西原 拓夢; born 1992), Japanese footballer

== Fictional characters ==
- Takumu Mayuzumi, a character of the light novel and anime series Accel World
