= Seishirō Sakamoto =

Japanese baseball player (born 1993)

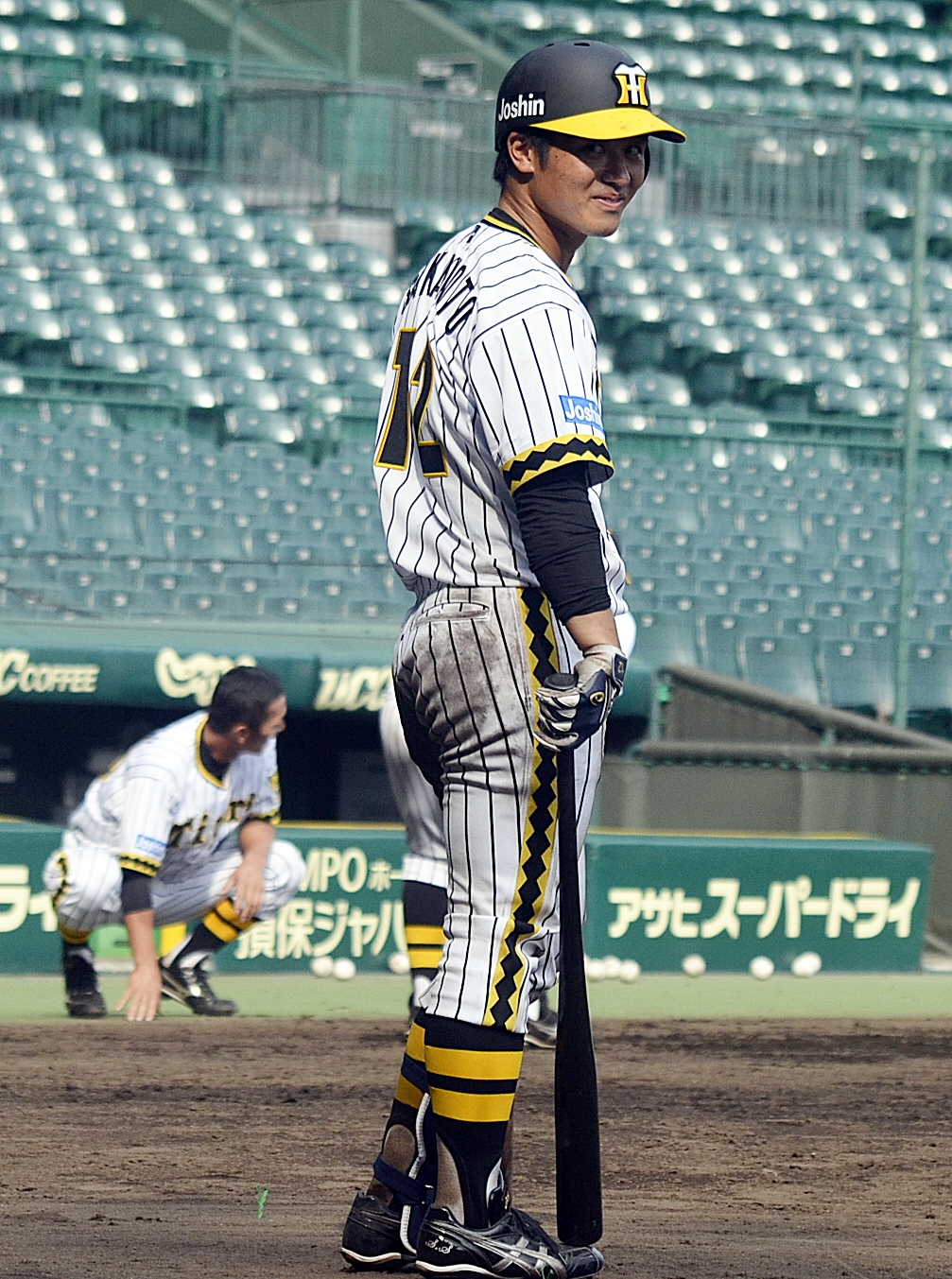
- Sakamoto with the Hanshin Tigers

Hanshin Tigers – No. 12
- Catcher
- Born: November 10, 1993 (age 32); Yabu, Hyōgo, Japan
- Bats: Right Throws: Right

NPB debut
- July 19, 2016, for the Hanshin Tigers

NPB statistics (through 2025 season)
- Batting average: .223
- Home runs: 8
- Runs batted in: 99
- Stats at Baseball Reference

Teams
- Hanshin Tigers (2016–present)

Career highlights and awards
- 1× Japan Series champion (2023); 1× NPB All-Star (2025); 1× Central League Best Nine Award (2025); 2× Central League Golden Glove Award (2023, 2025)

Seishirō Sakamoto (坂本 誠志郎, Sakamoto Seishirō; born November 10, 1993) is a Japanese professional baseball catcher for the Hanshin Tigers of Nippon Professional Baseball (NPB).
