= Yuki Nishi =

Japanese baseball player (born 1990)

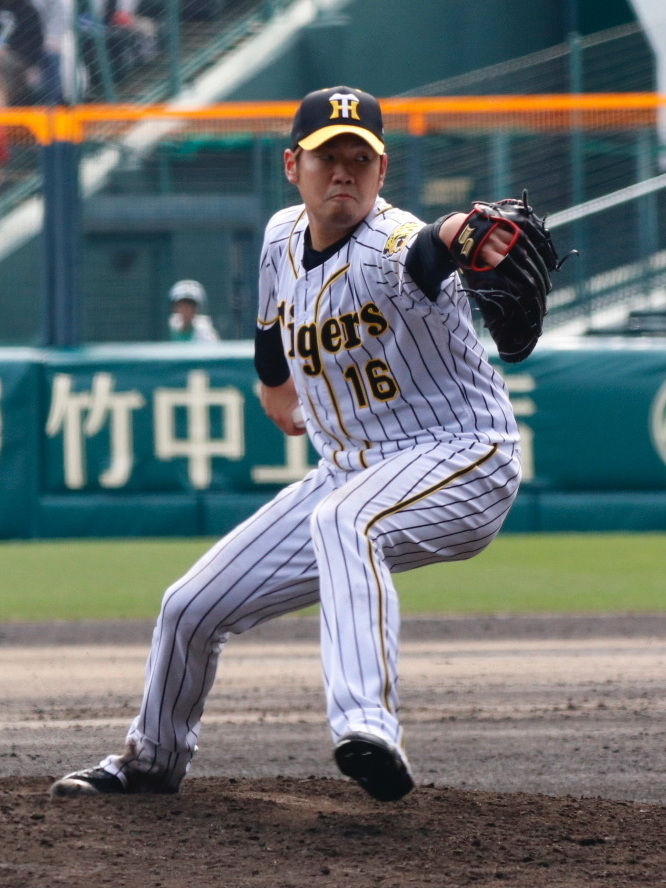
- Nishi with the Hanshin Tigers in 2019

Hanshin Tigers – No. 16
- Pitcher
- Born: November 10, 1990 (age 35)
- Bats: Right Throws: Right

NPB debut
- September 21, 2009, for the Orix Buffaloes

NPB statistics (through 2024 season)
- Win–loss record: 124-108
- ERA: 3.10
- Strikeouts: 1,482
- Saves: 1
- Holds: 1
- Stats at Baseball Reference

Teams
- Orix Buffaloes (2009–2018); Hanshin Tigers (2019–present)

Career highlights and awards
- 1× Mitsui Golden Glove Award (2019); 3× NPB All-Star (2012, 2014, 2015); 1× Japan Series Champion (2023)

Medal record

Men's baseball

Representing Japan

2015 WBSC Premier12
Bronze medal – third place	2015 Tokyo	Team

Yuki Nishi (西 勇輝, Nishi Yūki; born November 10, 1990, in Komono, Mie) is a Japanese professional baseball pitcher for the Hanshin Tigers of Nippon Professional Baseball (NPB). He has previously played in NPB for the Orix Buffaloes from 2009 to 2018.

== Early baseball career ==
He started playing baseball in his 2nd grade, and pitched in the local leagues all the way to junior high. As the ace pitcher of Komono High in Mie Prefecture, he led his school to the prefectural championships in his second year, and all the way to the 1st round of the 2008 Summer Koshien Tournament in his senior year where they lost to Sendai Ikuei High.

== Orix Buffaloes ==
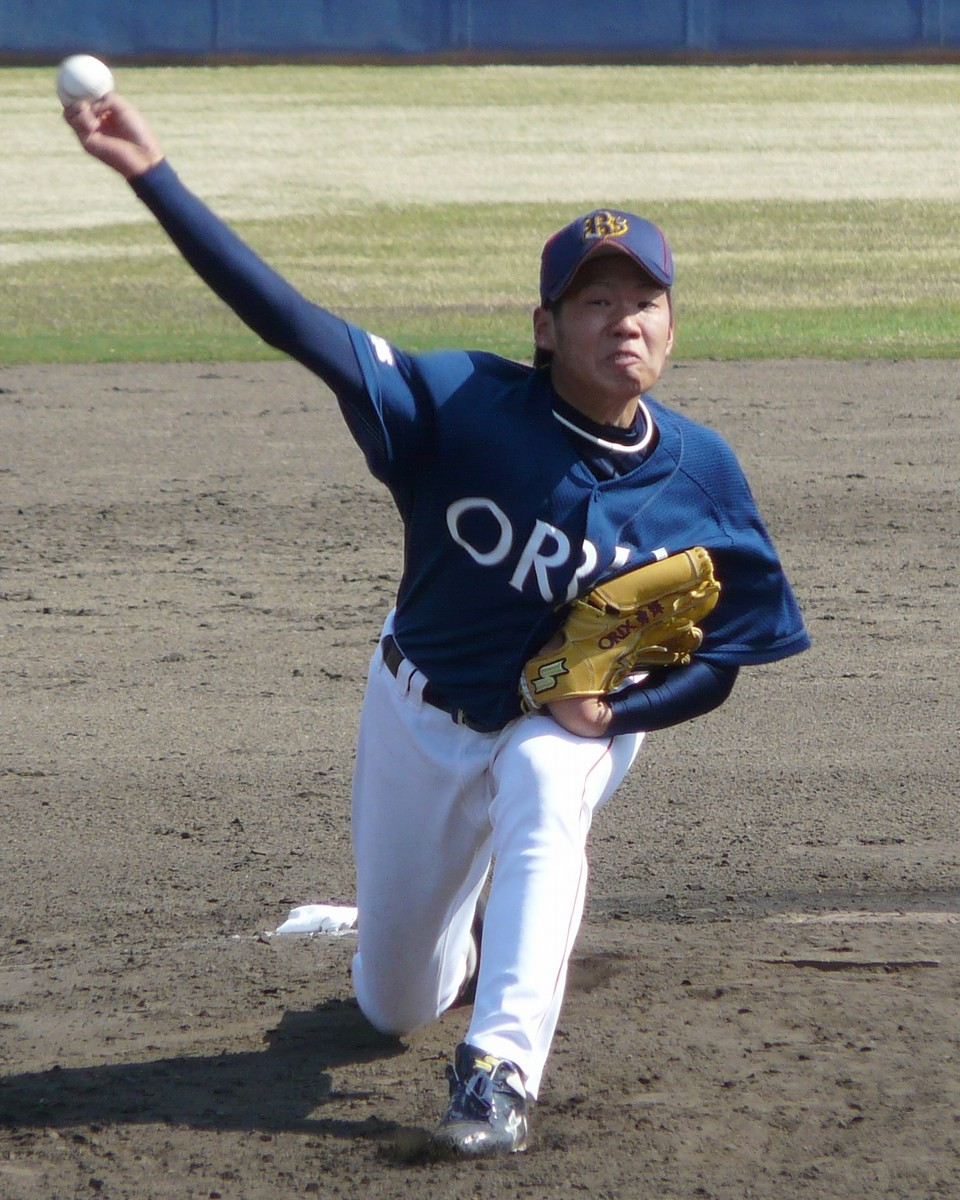
Nishi with the Orix Buffaloes.

He was the Orix Buffaloes' 3rd round pick in the 2008 NPB professional draft. He signed a 50 million yen contract with Orix for an annual salary of 5 million, and was assigned the jersey number 63.

2009

He spent his first year pitching mostly in Western League games (minors). He debuted in the main squad as the 7th inning reliever in the September 21 match against the Eagles and pitched a 1-2-3 finish. He is the first Orix pitcher out of high school to debut in his first year since the team's merger formation in 2005. He had 3 more outings as a reliever, and ended the season with zero hits and earned runs.

2010

He was mainly used as a middle reliever for the earlier half of the season. He was finally given the chance to start the August 12 match against Softbank, and did not surrender any hits for 5.6 innings until the opponent's hitters managed to score a run that took away his first would-be win. A few weeks after, he was diagnosed with Bell's palsy and decided to undergo a 2-month treatment. As he was prohibited from doing intense physical activities during treatment, he stopped appearing in games and finished the season with only 1 hold and 3.41 ERA in 18 games.

2011

After pitching well in the pre-season exhibition games, he became part of the main squad starting rotation. He got his first start on April 17 against Softbank in Koshien, and recorded his first career win after pitching 7 innings and surrendering only 3 hits and a single run. He went on a roll and pitched undefeated in his next 3 outings, securing his 4th win by May 8 against the Marines. His winning streak ended there however, and he didn't manage another win until June 4. He caught the flu the day before his next outing, and assigning the newly acquired pitcher Evan MacLane as his replacement put an end to Orix's seven-game winning streak. He was severely scolded for not taking better care of himself, and was removed from the roster by team manager Akinobu Okada as punishment. He was called back on July 1 and pitched 3 innings in relief to record his first career save. He then alternated as a starter and reliever in the following weeks, and on August 11, he pitched his first complete game while giving up only a single run. But after acquiring 2 consecutive losses within 3 days in October, he was again removed from the roster. Two weeks later, he earned his last win in his final outing, and finished the season with 10-7 and a 3.03 ERA from 25 games.

2012

His jersey number got changed to 21 before the season started, and he stopped the Buffaloes' 3-game losing streak since the season opener when he won his first outing against the Fighters on April 3. Together with Chihiro Kaneko and Hayato Terahara, they formed the team's main starters. In July, he also got voted into his first All-Star game where he relieved Yuki Saito in the 4th inning of Game 1 and retired Yoshinobu Takahashi. He continued to pitch well afterwards, but was removed from the rotation on August 9 when he experienced pain in his pitching arm. He returned two months later and threw a no-hitter against the Softbank Hawks on October 8, fanning nine and allowing only one baserunner (a walk to Nobuhiko Matsunaka in the 5th). He was the 76th NPB hurler and 26th in the Pacific League to throw a no-no, the first since Narciso Elvira in 2000. He was only the second NPB hurler to throw a no-hitter on the last day of the season and the first in NPB's 64 years of being a two-league format; Mitsuhiko Ishida had done it in the spring 1937 season. He finished the season with 8-3 and 2.78 ERA, and topped the team in wins.

2013

He appeared in a personal high of 28 games, and finished with 9-8 and a 3.63 ERA in 166 innings. His 9 wins included winning 3 complete games.

2014

He started the season in top form and won all of his 8 starts by May 20. He lost his next start by giving up a single run to the Dragons, and lost a couple more after, but by July 8, he already racked up 11 wins. This got him the top vote for the All-star game starting pitchers for the Pacific League team. From August however, his pitching fell into a slump and he lost 5 consecutive starts. He finished with 12-10 and 3.29 ERA in 24 starts. He also pitched in the post-season PL playoffs and in the Nichibei series where Japan won by 3–2–0. In game 3, he struck out four with one walk over two innings, and became part of a four-man combined effort to pitch a no-hitter against MLB all-stars who suffered their third straight loss.

2015

His lackluster pitching continued into 2015 where he could not manage to secure a win in his first 6 starts. To make matters worse, he had another episode of facial paralysis prior to his start on April 28 so he had to be replaced. He returned to the mound on May 10 to notch his first victory of the season against the Fighters, a feat that he hasn't managed since he last won on August 1, 2014. Things turned around for him eventually, and he managed to rack up 10 wins until the season ended. He also made it into another All-Star game. Despite his shaky season start and not recording more wins, he topped the league in quality start percentage (83.3%) and finished 2nd in ERA with 2.38 (0.14 behind Shohei Ohtani). During post-season, was again selected to play for the national team for the 2015 WBSC Premier12 where he recorded the 1 win in 2 games. Afterwards, he received a 25 million yen pay raise and became the youngest ever Buffaloes hurler to reach a salary of 100 million yen at 25 years old.

2016

He fared worse in 2016 as he struggled with control on the mound. He lost his first 3 starts, and continued to pitch poorly afterwards that he became the first pitcher in both leagues to notch 7 losses by the end of May. He managed a brief comeback in June where he won 4 games straight, and won a couple more afterwards to finish the season with 10–12, and a career-low ERA of 4.14 out of 26 appearances. Despite giving away only 4 home runs and having the most wins amongst the team's pitchers, he also topped the league in losses with 12 and recorded a career worst of 48 walks.

2017

He started strong in 2017 where he went the distance against the Fighters on April 9, and threw a 154 pitch effort to record the season's first shutout win among all NPB hurlers. This was also his career first shutout win against the Fighters. He recorded another win afterwards, but then he went on a 3-game losing streak late in April. On top of that, he experienced pain in his left ankle early in May which got him removed from the starting roster. He returned in June, and gathered 4 more wins until his left wrist was hit and fractured by a batted liner during the August 22 game against the Fighters. He was once more removed from the roster to undergo treatment and rehab, and his season ended with 5-6 and a 3.44 ERA in 17 games.

2018

This was his first year to start the season opening game on March 30 against Softbank. Despite pitching 7 scoreless innings, he gave away 2 runs in the 8th and earned his first loss when the game ended at 0–2. He pitched a lot of quality starts in succeeding games, but failed to get wins for lack of run support. He recorded 3 straight wins in June but went on a 4-game losing streak afterwards. In spite of this, he was the only starter in the team who managed to remain in the roster all throughout the season. He finished with 10-13 and a 3.60 ERA.

== Domestic free agency ==
He earned his domestic free agency option in May 2018, and according to media reports, he asked Orix about getting posted to the majors during the 2018 off-season but was turned down. After the season ended, he decided to exercise his option and met with Orix, Softbank and Hanshin who each offered him a four-year deal. After many discussions with the said teams, he accepted the deal with Hanshin worth an estimated one billion yen even though Softbank offered double the amount.

== Hanshin Tigers ==
2019

He was Hanshin's best pitcher in his first year with the club, winning 10 games with a 2.92 ERA (fifth-best in the Central League) and 1.13 WHIP in 172⅓ innings. While he did not record the win in his first outing, he pitched a complete game in his next start against the Carps to notch his first complete win in 2 years. He continued to pitch well and reached the 1,000 strike-out milestone on June 21, becoming the 149th NPB pitcher to do so. When the Tigers were fighting a tight battle with the Carps for 3rd towards the end of the season, he brought his A-game and won all of his 4 starts in September (1.93 ERA) which not only earned him the MVP of the month award (first since 2014), it also proved instrumental to the Tigers' narrow advance in the final rankings. He also topped the league in Quality Start Percentage with 73.08% (19 out of 26 starts), and earned his first ever Pitcher Golden Glove award.

He did not fare well during the post-season Climax Series however, as he got removed after 1 inning in game 1 of the First Stage for giving away 5 straight hits and 3 RBIs, and he also lost his start against the Giants in the Final Stage which ultimately ended the Tigers' chance of winning the play-offs.

== Pitching style ==
2020 Pitching Stats
Pitch	Percent Thrown	Hit Rate	Strikeout + Fanning Rate	Avg Speed km/h
Slider	33%	20%	24%	129
Shuuto	32%	25%	21%	140
Changeup	25%	15%	20%	132
Four-seam	6%	29%	15%	140
Curve	4%	32%	28%	111

A 5'11 tall right-handed pitcher with three quarters delivery, Nishi throws a shuuto in the 140 km/h (87 mph) range as his main pitch, coupled with a slider and a changeup. His shuuto and slider are both known to exhibit horizontal movements as they approach the plate and are virtually indistinguishable. His fastest pitch was clocked at 149 km/h (93 mph). Also included in his arsenal are a four-seam fastball, a curveball and a rare forkball.

During his first few years with Orix, his tendency towards inside pitching earned him the league's highest hit by pitch count in 2011 & 2013.

== Personal trivia ==
During his sophomore year, Nishi began being scouted by former Kintetsu Buffaloes player Tetsuya Adachi. Despite giving away 15 hits during his Koshien match (which was later revealed to be due to the catcher's injured thumb so Nishi had to pitch with more care), Adachi recommended him to Orix as he saw huge potential in Nishi's shuuto which "despite its raw quality at the time had the potential to be lethal even against pro hitters".

In August 2010, he began to suffer from sudden facial paralysis where he lost sensation on the right side of his face, lost his sense of taste and got severe headaches and ringing in his ears. He was later diagnosed with Bell's palsy and was advised by the doctor not to continue playing baseball. Despite being given what was considered a "death sentence" which could force the then 19 year-old rookie into early retirement, he decided to undergo treatment and was able to recover after 2 months. He occasionally suffers from facial paralysis, like on April 28, 2015 where he ended up getting replaced before his scheduled start.

He is also a huge fan of Doraemon and Dorabase manga series. Shintaro Mugiwara, the creator of Dorabase, gifted him with special goods from the series and even collaborated with him in a special manga publication.

He is the third-cousin of Junya Nishi - a two-way player who was Hanshin's top pick in the 2019 draft. Their great-grandfathers were brothers.
