= Takumu Nakano =

Japanese baseball player (born 1996)

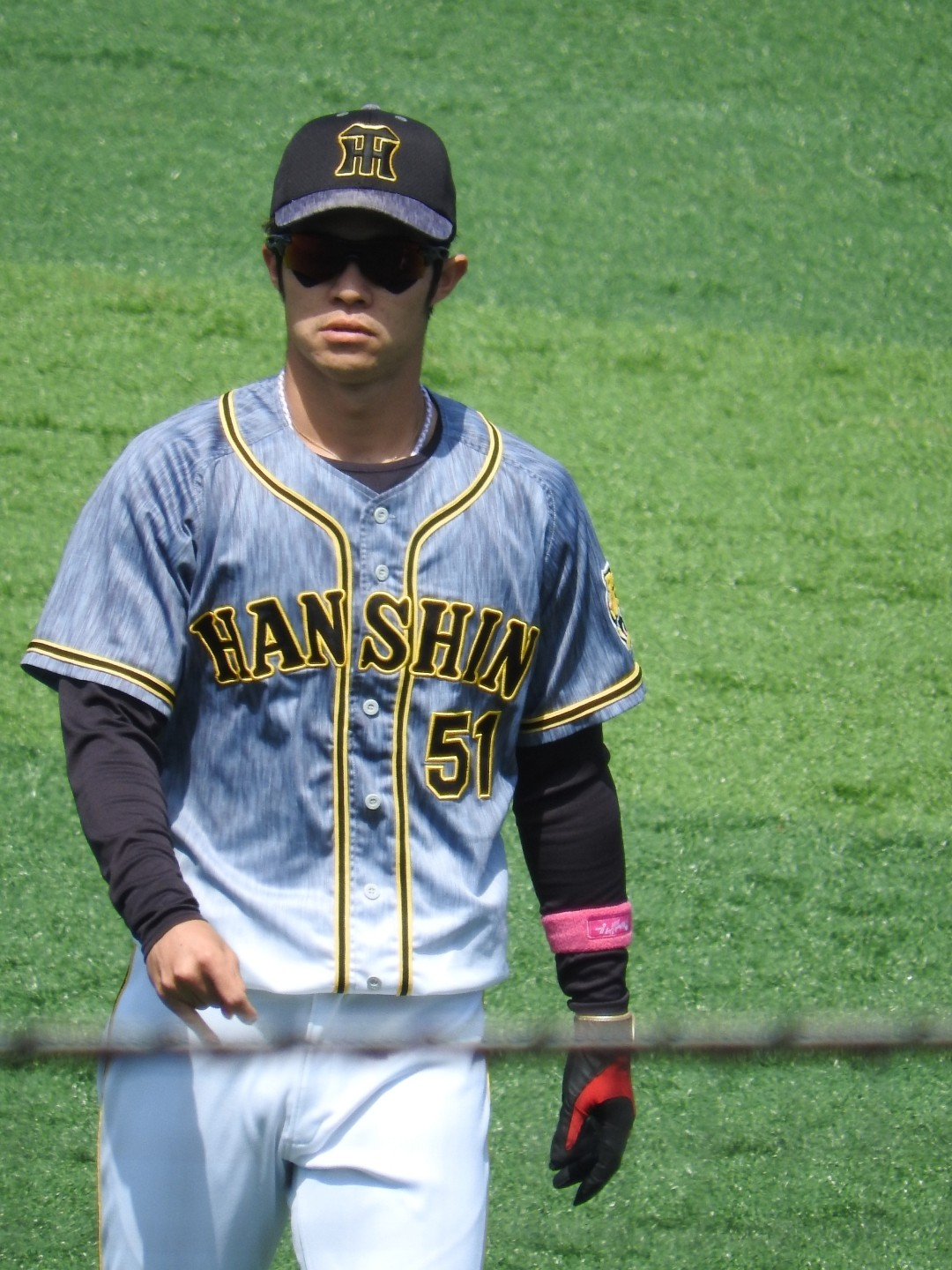
- Nakano playing for the Tigers

Hanshin Tigers – No. 7
- Infielder
- Born: June 28, 1996 (age 30); Tendō, Yamagata, Japan
- Bats: Left Throws: Right

NPB debut
- March 26, 2021, for the Hanshin Tigers

NPB statistics (through 2025 season)
- Batting average: .270
- Hits: 725
- Stolen bases: 98
- Home runs: 10
- RBI: 163
- Stats at Baseball Reference

Teams
- Hanshin Tigers (2021–present)

Career highlights and awards
- 1× Stolen Base Leader (2021); 5× NPB All-Star (2021–2025); 2× Mitsui Golden Glove Award (2023, 2025); 2× Best Nine Award (2022, 2025); 1× Japan Series Champion (2023)
Medals
Men's baseball
Representing Japan
World Baseball Classic
Gold medal – first place	2023 Miami	Team

Takumu Nakano (中野 拓夢, Nakano, Takumu; born June 28, 1996) is a Japanese professional baseball infielder for the Hanshin Tigers of Nippon Professional Baseball (NPB).

== Early baseball career ==
Born and raised in Tendō City, Takumu started playing ball in 3rd grade, and continued to play mainly as a shortstop for the Yamagata Seniors team in junior high. He switched to second base when he entered NichiDai Yamagata High School as the shortstop position was already secured by Nobuyuki Okumura, an upper classman at the time. He helped his team make it all the way to the semi-finals of the 2013 Summer Koshien tournament, but they lost to Maebashi Ikuei High. He got the shortstop position in his final year, but his team did not make it to nationals.

He entered Tohoku Fukushi University, where under the guidance of the head coach, former Lions outfielder Kōji Ōtsuka, he tried his skills at switch-hitting. He was selected as Best 9 in his 3rd and 4th year, and contributed a run against International Budo University's Masashi Itō to win the finals of the 2018 Japan National Collegiate Baseball Championship.

When he went undrafted after graduation, he joined the Industrial Leagues for two years as a shortstop under Mitsubishi Motors Okazaki. He batted 0.421 and notched 4 runs during the nationals in his first season. He was also selected to play in the 2019 Asia Winter Baseball League where he helped Japan's amateur team win the finals, and finished with the most hits (26) and second best batting average (.371) in the league. While he is not known as a power hitter, he was able to hit 2 home runs during the 2020 Intercity Baseball Tournament.

== Professional career ==
=== Hanshin Tigers ===
He was the Tiger's 6th round pick at the 2020 Nippon Professional Baseball draft. He signed a 35 million yen contract with the Tigers for an estimated annual salary of 8 million. He was assigned the jersey number 51.

2021

His performance during the pre-season exhibition games (0.286 and 2 stolen bases in 12 games) earned him a spot in the main squad roster when the season began. He debuted as a substitute to 2nd baseman Kento Itohara in the 7th inning of the March 26 season opener against the Swallows. He notched a hit to center field on his first at-bat in the same game. When he continued to bat well as a sub in his next 14 games (0.462 average), Manager Yano finally placed him in the starting line up on the April 10 game against the Baystars, and Nakano stepped up to the plate to score his first career RBI. He continued to appear in most of the team's games as the main shortstop (2nd or 8th batter in the lineup), and he finished April with a batting average of 0.340 with 6 RBIs and 2 stolen bases.

== Playing style ==
Takumu is a 171 cm infielder who has experience fielding as 2nd baseman and shortstop. His right arm boasts a 100-meter throwing distance, while his 50-meter dash was clocked at 5.9 seconds.

== Personal trivia ==
Despite living in the Tohoku region, he was raised in a household of Hanshin Tigers fans.
