= Kōji Chikamoto =

Japanese baseball player (born 1994)

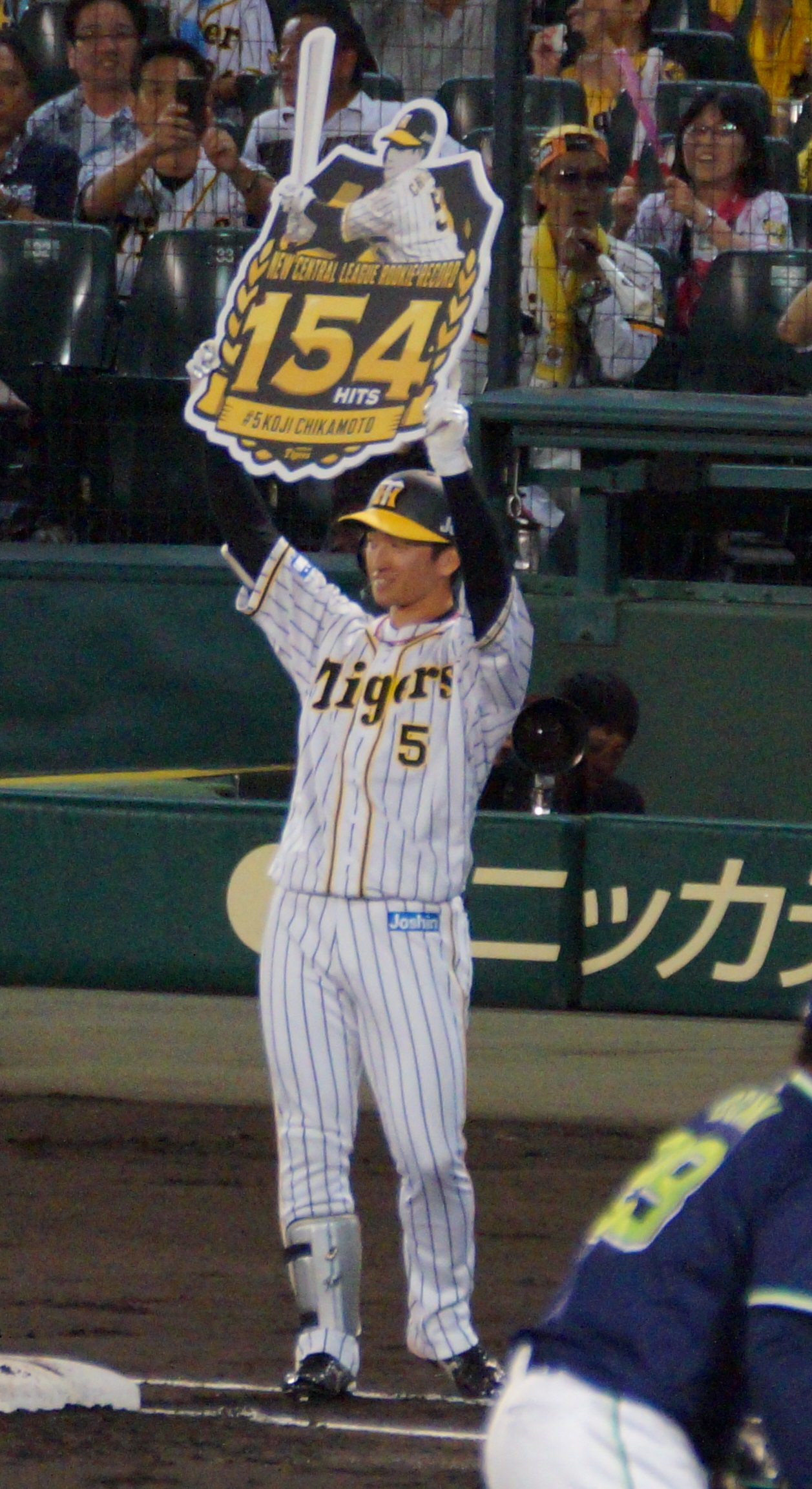
- Chikamoto in 2019 upon breaking the rookie hit record for the Central League

Hanshin Tigers – No. 5
- Outfielder
- Born: November 9, 1994 (age 31); Awaji, Hyōgo, Japan
- Bats: Left Throws: Left

NPB debut
- March 29, 2019, for the Hanshin Tigers

NPB statistics (through 2025 season)
- Batting average: .288
- Home runs: 48
- Runs batted in: 304
- Stolen bases: 200
- Stats at Baseball Reference

Teams
- Hanshin Tigers (2019–present)

Career highlights and awards
- 5× NPB All-Star (2019, 2021, 2022, 2024, 2025); 6× Central League stolen bases leader (2019, 2020, 2022-2025); Japan Series champion (2023); Japan Series Most Valuable Player Award (2023); NPB All-Star Most Valuable Player Award (2019); 5× Mitsui Golden Glove Award (2021-2025); 5× Best Nine Award (2021-2025); Central League Federation Special Award (2019)

Kōji Chikamoto (近本 光司, Chikamoto, Kōji; born November 9, 1994) is a Japanese professional baseball outfielder for the Hanshin Tigers of Nippon Professional Baseball (NPB).

== Amateur career ==
=== Early career ===
Kōji started playing little league softball in 2nd grade for the Kariya Club in his hometown in Awaji, where he continued to play all the way up to junior high school. He joined the Yashiro High School's baseball team as a pitcher, but doubled as an outfielder with the aim to develop a more holistic physique. By his 3rd year, he was batting clean up and belonged to his team's best 8. His team never made it to Spring Koshien or Summer Koshien, but he helped them win the runner-up during the prefectural tournament in his second year.

He entered as a pitcher again in Kwansei Gakuin University, but due to injuries in his shoulders and elbow, he switched to an outfielder position in his 3rd year. In that same year, he recorded the most stolen bases (10) during the Kansai League spring tournament, and made it to the league's best nine. In all of his 30 league appearances, he finished with a 0.352 batting average, 43 hits, 2 home runs, 16 RBIs and 13 stolen bases.

=== Osaka Gas ===
When he went undrafted after graduation, he joined the industrial leagues under Osaka Gas where he was a regular in the line up. In his second year playing in the Intercity Baseball Tournament, he helped his team win the championships, and received the Hashido Award as the league's most valuable player with a batting average of 0.524. He also joined the national team in the 2018 Asian Games, where Japan won the runner up.

== Professional career ==
Chikamoto was chosen as the Hanshin Tigers' 3rd alternative pick during the 1st round of the 2018 Nippon Professional Baseball draft (after they lost the lottery draw for Kyota Fujiwara and Ryosuke Tatsumi). He signed a 100 million yen contract with the Tigers, plus 50 million yen signing bonus for an estimated 15 million yen annual salary. He was assigned the jersey number 5.

He joined the main squad during spring camp training in 2019, and batted .373 on 22 hits. This earned him the lead-off and starting center field position in the March 29 season opening game against the Swallows. During the 6th inning, his first career hit tied the game and he became the first Hanshin rookie since 1956 to score in the season opener. Hanshin won the game. His next appearances were not so productive which got him removed from the line up, but his performance picked up after he hit his first home run against the Baystars on April 11. From then on, he continued to secure the lead-off spot and went on a hitting spree for 13 consecutive games which broke the team rookie record. In the same month, he batted an average of .349 and set a new record for the most home runs hit by a rookie in a single month (4).

In May, he showcased his speed by recording 10 stolen bases. He went on a slump during the June inter-league games, but his previous performances were enough to earn him a spot in the outfield during the mid-season All-Star Series. He did not disappoint when went 5-for-5 on the July 13 series finale, and became the second player and only rookie in NPB history to hit for the cycle in an All-Star game. He also became the first rookie to start an All-Star game with a lead off home run. With the help of Tigers teammates Fumihito Haraguchi and Ryutaro Umeno who both hit solo homers to the delight of the home crowd in Koshien Stadium, the Central League team notched an 11–3 win over the Pacific League. With this victory, Chikamoto was awarded the MVP of the Game for his stellar performance.

On September 5, he notched his 137th hit and surpassed the Hanshin rookie hit record previously achieved by Shun Takayama in 2016. On September 16, he broke the Hanshin rookie multi-hit record when he collected his 41st multi-hit game. Three days later, he broke the Central League rookie hit record (previously held by Shigeo Nagashima in 1958) when he hit his 154th at Koshien.

He finished the season with 159 hits, 42 RBI including 9 home runs, and a .271 batting average out of 142 games (he only missed a single game). While he might not have surpassed any RBI records, he topped the league in stolen bases with 36, making him only the 3rd rookie to do so in NPB history. This earned him a 30 million pay raise, tripling his annual salary to 45 million yen.

Chikamoto continued to secure the lead-off position in 2020. His hit production started a bit slow in June as he notched only 5 hits in 10 games, but it gradually picked up to peak at .352 in August and remained around .300 until the season ended. Despite seeing less playing time due to a COVID-19 pandemic-shortened season, he appeared in all of the team's 120 games and hit a higher average of .293 with 45 RBI including 9 home runs. He recorded a higher OPS of .759 and once again topped the league in stolen bases with 31. His base stealing success rate improved from 70% in 2019 to 79%, and he became 8th NPB player and the first Hanshin player to notch over 30 stolen bases for 2 consecutive years since his debut. This feat was last accomplished in 1953 by then 2nd year rookie Takao Satoh of the Kokutetsu Swallows (present day Yakult Swallows). While his fielding could use some improvement, he tied the league top in UZR at 19.1. His performance earned him another 30 million pay raise, making his annual salary 75 million yen.

Chikamoto had 14 hits in the 2023 Japan Series and won the Japan Series Most Valuable Player Award.

On May 11, 2024, Chikamoto hit his first career grand slam.

== Playing style ==
Despite his average stature of 1.7 metres (5 ft 7 in), his 50 yard dash was timed at 5.8 seconds, and his throws cover a distance of 100 meters. He employs a "flamingo" stance (knee raised to hip level) while hitting, and has been known to hit home runs to the opposite field.
