= Kotaro Otake =

Japanese baseball player (born 1995)

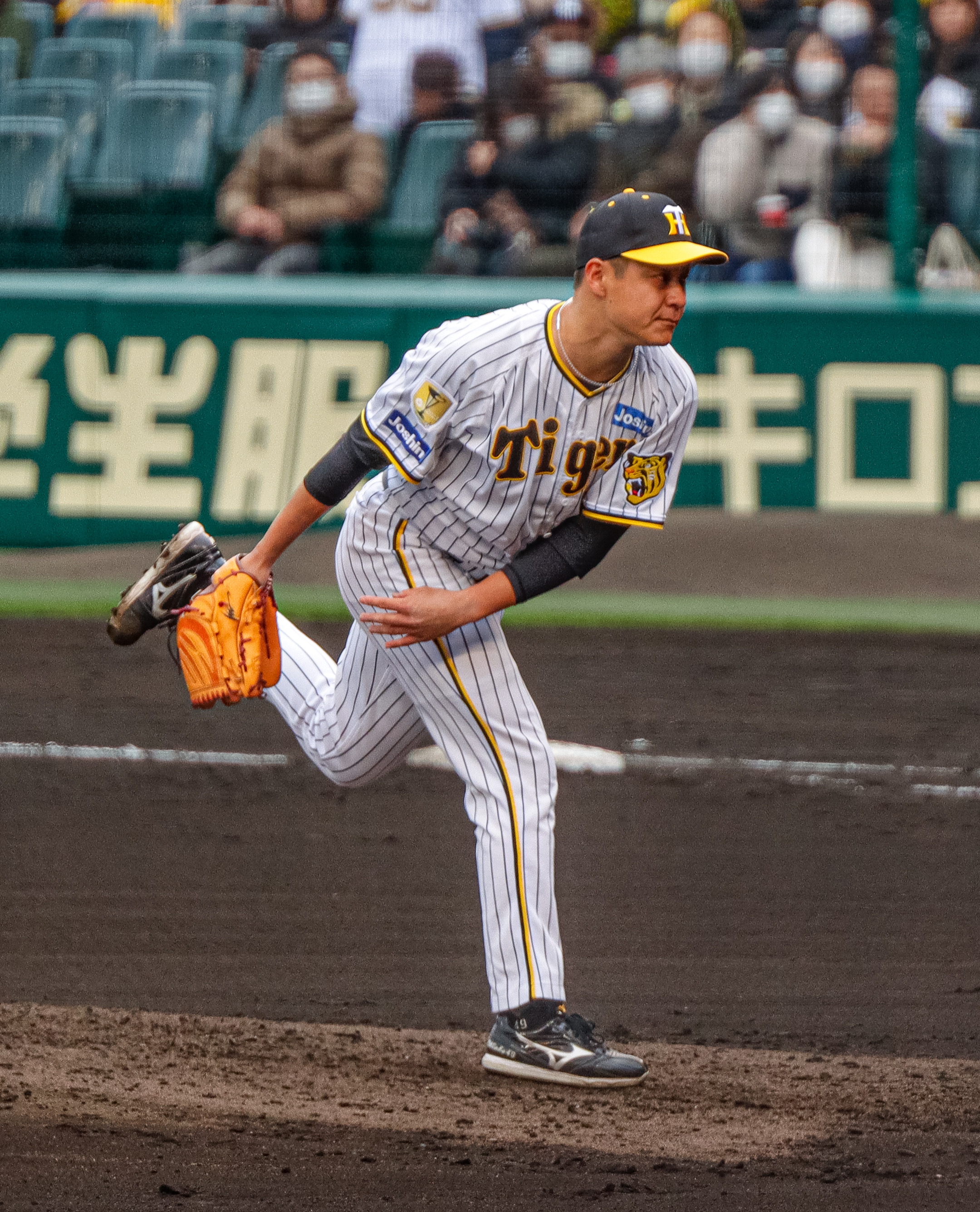
- Otake with the Fukuoka SoftBank Hawks

Hanshin Tigers – No. 21
- Pitcher
- Born: June 29, 1995 (age 30); Kumamoto, Kumamoto, Japan
- Bats: Left Throws: Left

NPB debut
- August 1, 2018, for the Fukuoka SoftBank Hawks

NPB statistics (through 2025 season)
- Win–loss record: 42-22
- Earned run average: 3.09
- Strikeouts: 343
- Stats at Baseball Reference

Teams
- Fukuoka SoftBank Hawks (2018–2022); Hanshin Tigers (2023–present)

Career highlights and awards
- 4× Japan Series Champion (2018–2020, 2023); 2× Western League Wins Leader Award (2018,2020); Western League ERA Leader Award (2020); Western League Winning percentage Leader Award (2020); Western League Excellent Pitcher Award (2020)

Kotaro Otake (大竹 耕太郎, Ōtake Kōtarō; born June 29, 1995) is a Japanese professional baseball pitcher for the Hanshin Tigers of Nippon Professional Baseball (NPB). He has previously played in NPB for the Fukuoka SoftBank Hawks.

== Early baseball career ==
Otake participated in the 2nd grade summer 94th Japanese High School Baseball Championship and the 3rd grade spring 85th Japanese High School Baseball Invitational Tournament as an ace pitcher at Seisei High School. He went to Waseda University and won the Best Nine in the Tokyo Big6 Baseball League.

== Professional career ==
=== Fukuoka SoftBank Hawks ===
On October 26, 2017, Otake was not drafted as a registered player under control in the 2017 Nippon Professional Baseball draft, but drafted as a developmental player by the Fukuoka Softbank Hawks.

On July 29, 2018, he signed a 6 million yen contract with the Fukuoka SoftBank Hawks as a registered player under control. On August 1, Otake debuted against the Saitama Seibu Lions and won the game for the first time. In 2018 season, he finished the regular season with a 3–2 Win–loss record, a 3.88 ERA, a 36 strikeouts in 48 2/3 innings. And he pitched in the 2018 Japan Series.

In 2019 season, Otake finished the regular season with a 5–4 Win–loss record, a 3.82 ERA, a 72 strikeouts in 106 innings. And he was selected as the Japan Series roster in the 2019 Japan Series.

In 2020 season, Otake delayed his first pitch in the Pacific League to August 13 due to rehabilitation of his left elbow injury. He recorded with a 3 Games pitched, a 2–0 Win–loss record, a 2.30 ERA, a 8 strikeouts in 15.2 innings. And he recorded with a 16 Games pitched, a 6–3 Win–loss record, a.667 Winning percentage, a 2.53 ERA, a 73 strikeouts in 92.1 innings in the Western League of NPB's minor leagues, was honored for the Western League Wins Leader Award, the Western League ERA Leader Award, the Western League Winning percentage Leader Award, and the Western League Excellent Pitcher Award at the NPB AWARD 2020. In the 2020 Japan Series against the Yomiuri Giants, he was selected as the Japan Series roster.

In 2021 season, Otake finished the regular season with 2 Games pitched, a 0–1 Win–loss record, a 15.75 ERA, a one strikeouts in 4 innings.

In 2022 season, he finished the regular season with 2 Games pitched, a 0–2 Win–loss record, a 6.43 ERA, a 5 strikeouts in 7 innings.

=== Hanshin Tigers ===
On December 9, 2022, Otake was nominated and transferred from the Hanshin Tigers in the active player draft held from the 2022 season.
