= Suguru Iwazaki =

Japanese baseball player (born 1991)

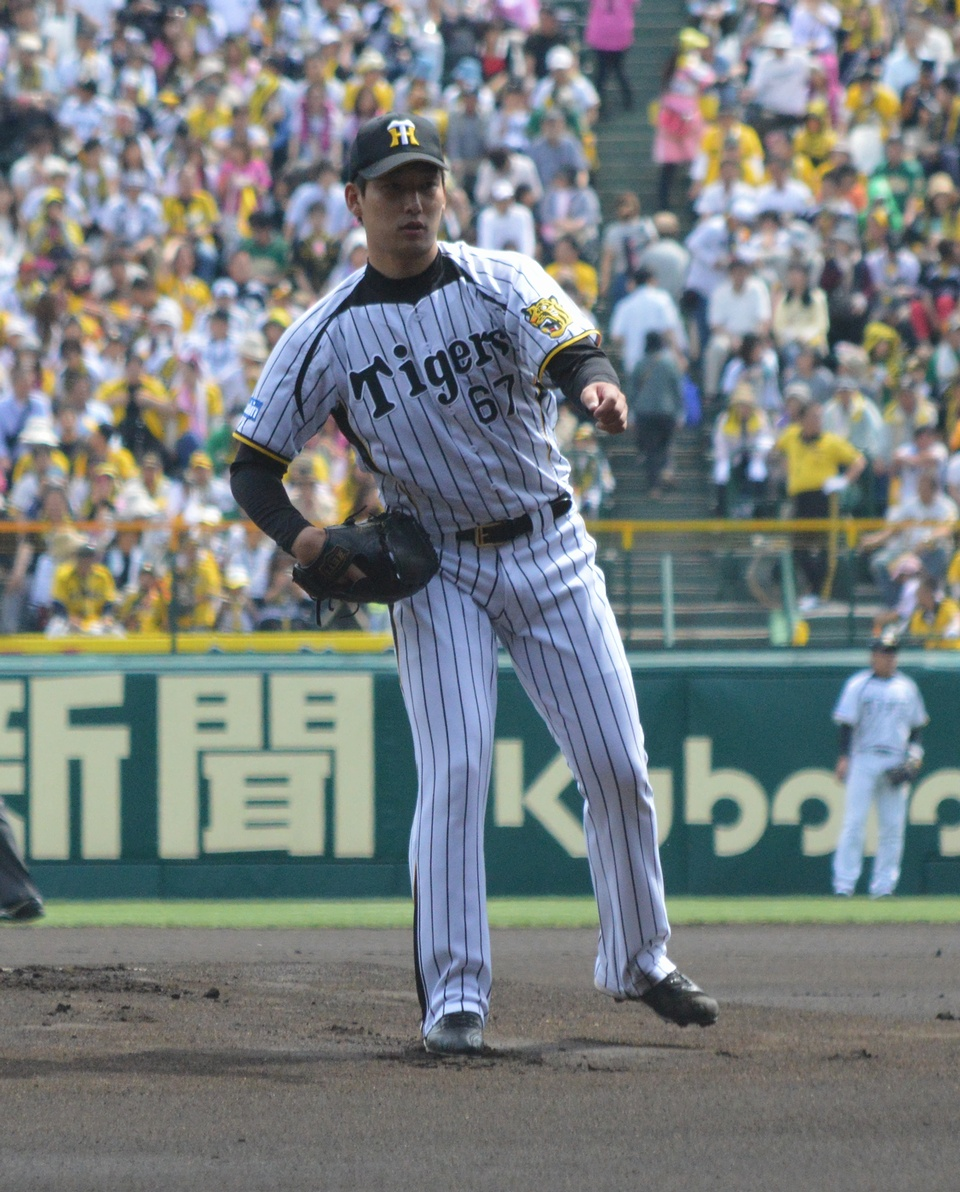
- Iwazaki with the Hanshin Tigers

Hanshin Tigers – No. 13
- Pitcher
- Born: June 19, 1991 (age 35); Shimizu, Shizuoka, Japan
- Bats: Left Throws: Left

NPB debut
- April 2, 2014, for the Hanshin Tigers

NPB statistics (through 2025 season)
- Win–loss record: 36-45
- Earned run average: 2.75
- Strikeouts: 688
- Saves: 120
- Holds: 157
- Stats at Baseball Reference

Teams
- Hanshin Tigers (2014–present)

Career highlights and awards
- 4× NPB All-Star (2021–2024); Japan Series champion (2023); 1× NPB Saves Leader (2023)
Medals
Men's baseball
Representing Japan
Summer Olympics
Gold medal – first place	2020 Tokyo	Team

Suguru Iwazaki (岩崎 優, Iwazaki Suguru; born June 19, 1991 in Shimizu, Shizuoka) is a Japanese professional baseball pitcher for the Hanshin Tigers of Nippon Professional Baseball (NPB).

Iwazaki is a 6-foot tall left-handed pitcher, and wears jersey No. 13. His surname is often misread as "Iwasaki" rather than "Iwazaki".

== Early baseball career ==
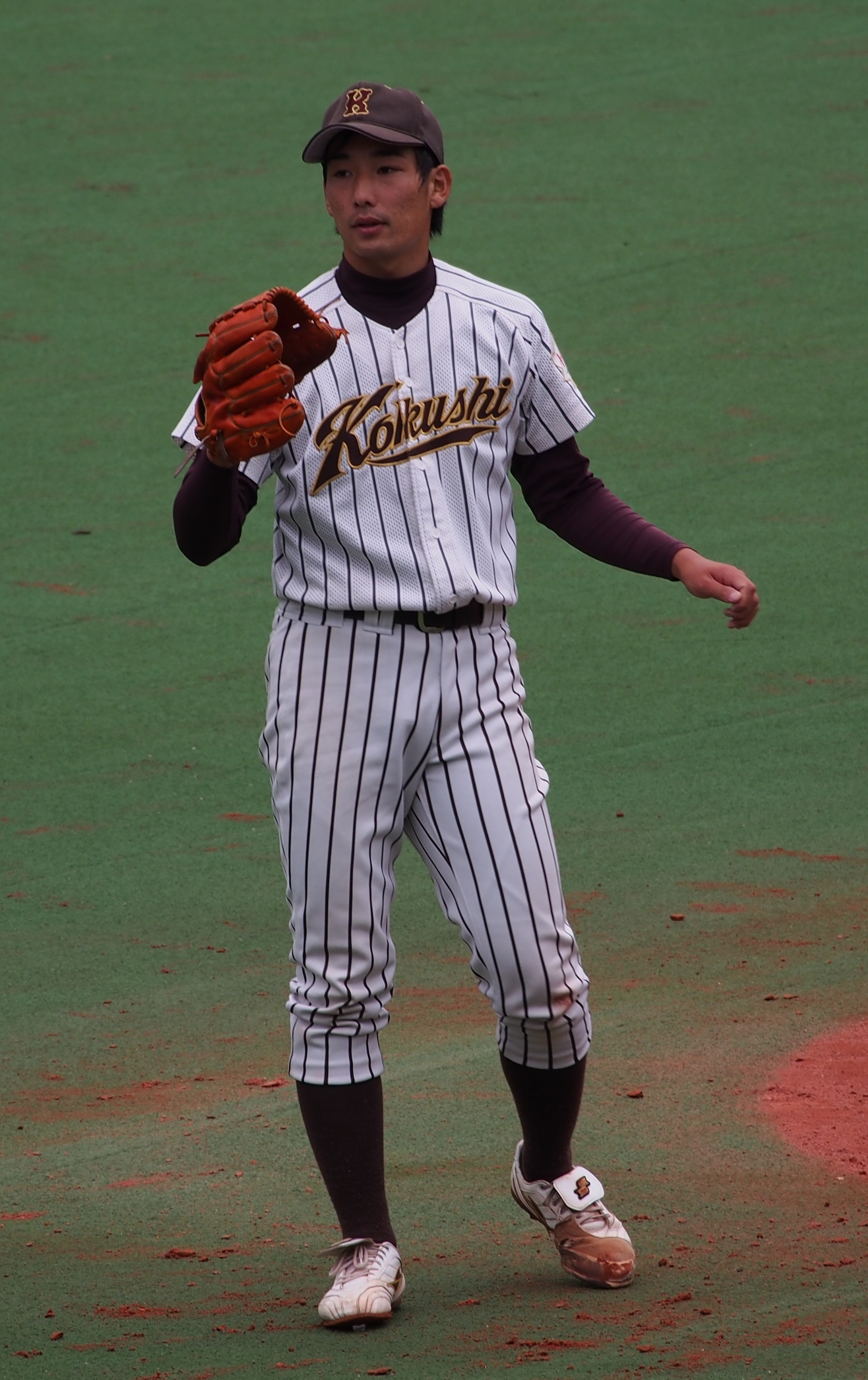
Playing for Kokushi University at Meiji Jingu Stadium, October 2013

Suguru is a native of Shimizu, Shizuoka. During his younger years, his mother who was an active member of the local softball team, assigned him to assist in picking up balls during her teams' practices. This eventually led to his interest in baseball.

He joined the school's softball team when he entered Shimizu Municipal Junior High School. Even though he entered Shimizu Higashi High School which is a school known for producing notable football players, he still declared his wish to join its baseball team.

He entered Kokushi University and participated in the Tohto University Baseball League, mostly as a relief pitcher up to his second year. He recorded an overall ERA of 0.94 during his 3rd year, the League's second best. For his senior's thesis, he broke down the advantages and disadvantages of left and right-handed pitchers.

Despite his coach's recommendations for him to play in the industrial leagues after graduation, he still opted to join the 2013 NPB draft.。

== Hanshin Tigers ==
Iwazaki was the Hanshin Tigers' sixth pick during the 2013 autumn draft. The Tigers originally intended to pick only five players during the draft, but upon the advice of Takayoshi Nakao, a scout for the Tigers who has been following Iwazaki since his junior year in Kokushi, they added him to their roster.

2014

He started the March 9 exhibition game with the Yomiuri Giants at Koshien. He pitched in ni-gun (farm) games afterwards. During the March 23 Western League game with the Orix Buffaloes, he pitched 6 scoreless innings, giving up only 1 hit, and earned his first victory.

He debuted as the starting pitcher on the April 2 Dragons match, where he pitched 5 scoreless innings, allowing 3 hits and a walk, while striking out three batters. The Tigers scored 15-0 that day, giving him his first win on his first official match as a starter, the 8th rookie to do so in franchise history. He joined Masahide Higasa (Chunichi, 7th-round draft pick in 1995) as the only pitchers drafted in the sixth round or later to record a victory in their first outing on their first year. Hanshin commemorated this feat by producing 99 serialized photo panels of Iwazaki that went on sale from April 8 for 16,200 yen (Hanshin rookie goods normally sell below 10,000 yen). He was given the 100th panel with serial number 67 – his jersey number.

He won another game against the Dragons on April 24. He formed a battery with fellow rookie Ryutaro Umeno on May 7, the first time since both rookies Yuya Ando and Ryo Asai started an official game in 2002. But he earned his first loss that day when he gave up 6 runs, and the Tigers lost 0–7 to the Dragons. He went for five more starts without securing a win until July 5, where he pitched 131 throws with Umeno in 7 shutout innings against the Baystars. This was the first time in 31 years that a Hanshin rookie battery won an official game since rookies Susumu Mikoshiba and Katsuhiko Kido did so in 1983.

After a bad outing with Hiroshima, he was removed from the register on July 26 and spent about a month in the farms. He returned on September 4, and recorded his first home victory at Koshien against the Baystars. He again won on his next outing against the Swallows at Meiji Jingu Stadium.

He finished the season with 5 wins and 4 losses, with an ERA of 3.50. With this, he became the first Hanshin rookie drafted as 6th pick to record 5 wins in his first year and season.

On November 21, he was given a raise of 8.4 million yen for an annual salary of 15 million yen for the 2015 season.

2015

He started the season as part of the starting rotation, but after a few rocky starts and failing to record a win in 7 games, he was sent back to the farm to improve his pitch control. He continued to appear in the Western League games, and on July 12, he earned a complete victory against Orix when only gave up 1 run in 9 innings. He was called back to the main squad and took the mound on August 9 against the Baystars to record his first win of the season. He won his next two starts, and had more quality starts in September but failed to record the win due to lack of early run support. He finished the season at 3-10 with a 3.51 ERA in 15 outings. He also pitched in relief during the 1st stage of the post-season playoffs. Despite his loss record, he earned a 5 million yen annual pay raise, bringing his total salary for the next year to 20 million yen .

2016

He spent the first few months in the farm as he suffered from back problems. He took the mound on May 21 against the Carps, and made it to August with 18 starts (3-5). But as the bullpen started to lose left-handed relievers due to injuries, Iwazaki was tasked to pitch in relief from September until the season ended. As he seemed to have adjusted to the role with ease, management decided post-season to permanently switch him as a middle reliever.

2017

He started the season as a mainstay reliever, and together with Kentaro Kuwahara, Akifumi Takahashi and Marcos Mateo, they served as the setup men for the team's main closer Rafael Dolis. Except for one pitching blip on September 18 where he left the mound after walking 2 consecutive batters without getting a single out which ultimately cost the game, he pitched in 66 solid outings (2nd most in the team) and finished the season with 4 wins, 1 loss, 15 holds and a 2.39 ERA. Together with Kuwahara, Takahashi, Mateo and Dolis, they made the Tigers become the first team in NPB history to have five pitchers reach sixty or more appearances in the same season. With this, he received a 20 million yen pay raise post-season, bringing his annual salary to 45 million yen.

2018

Even though their bullpen was short of southpaw starters, Hanshin still opted to use Iwazaki mainly as a reliever throughout the season. He fared slightly worse than 2017 and finished 1-3 with 10 holds and a lower ERA of 4.94. In spite of this, he received a 5 million raise and brought his annual pay to 50 million yen.

2019

Despite suffering from left elbow pain early in the season, he brought his A-game in all his outings starting April 12. He was however removed from the roster on May 4 when he contracted Influenza A. To make things worse, he also suffered from lower back pain so he did not return to the mound until June 19. Afterwards, he continued to pitch well, and was assigned more play time when Dolis went into a slump in July. From July 26 to August 24, he did not give up a single run in all of his 14 appearances. When the Tigers and Carps were battling for 3rd in the last few games of the season, he also went all out to notch 0.64 ERA in 13 consecutive games which proved instrumental in Hanshin's advance into the rankings and post-season playoffs. Despite having less outings compared to 2018, he finished stronger with 3 wins, no losses, 26 holds and a personal best of 1.01 ERA. He was particularly effective against the Baystars lineup where no one managed to score a run against him in all of his 10 outings with them. With his excellent performance in the playoffs taken into account, he received a 30 million pay raise bringing his annual salary to 80 million yen, and making this his 6th consecutive year to receive a pay raise.

2020

He injured his right foot during spring training and was not scheduled to be with the main squad for the season opener. But due to the season being delayed by the Covid-19 pandemic, he recovered in time to pitch in relief on his 29th birthday during the opening card with the Giants (June 19), which he lost after giving up 2 runs. He redeemed himself in July when he notched a 0.84 ERA in 11 outings, but experienced tightness in his left elbow that inevitably got him sent back to the farms later that month. He returned and had a couple of bad outings in August, but pitched 18 consecutive scoreless outings all the way until the end of October. He also experienced being a closer for the first time on September 3 to give the main closer Suarez a break, and earned his first career save when he maintained the 1-point lead against the Swallows in Koshien. He finished 5-2 with 17 holds and 2 saves in 41 outings, and a 1.82 ERA. With this performance, he once more earned a 15 million raise which brought his annual salary to 95 million yen, and made this his 7th consecutive year to receive a pay raise.

== Pitching style ==
With a three-quarters delivery, his fastest pitch was clocked at 149 km/h (93 mph). With almost exactly the same form, he can throw fastballs, breaking balls such as sliders and curves, and forkballs for changeups. His unique delivery makes it difficult for the batters to assess the origin of the pitch, and his balls to have a later release point. Upon seeing him pitch for the first time, 2nd squad manager Katsuo Hirata and pitching coach Takashi Yamaguchi praised his abilities and compared him to fellow lefty Yoshihisa Naruse of the Chiba Lotte Marines who was also a 6th pick in the rookie draft.

== Personal life ==
When Iwazaki was in grade school, his father wanted to prioritize the proper development of his shoulders so he was made to join the swimming club. He practiced all types of swimming styles that enabled him to train his legs, and at the same time, improved the flexibility of his arms and shoulders. Breaststroke was his forte.

He entered the 2013 draft but did not expect to be picked by any team because very few scouts came to check out his games. So after watching the first few rounds of the draft, he turned the TV off and just played computer games in his room. When a high school friend called to congratulate him for being drafted, he thought he was being pranked so he did not believe it at first.
