= Yuma Tongu =

Japanese baseball player (born 1996)

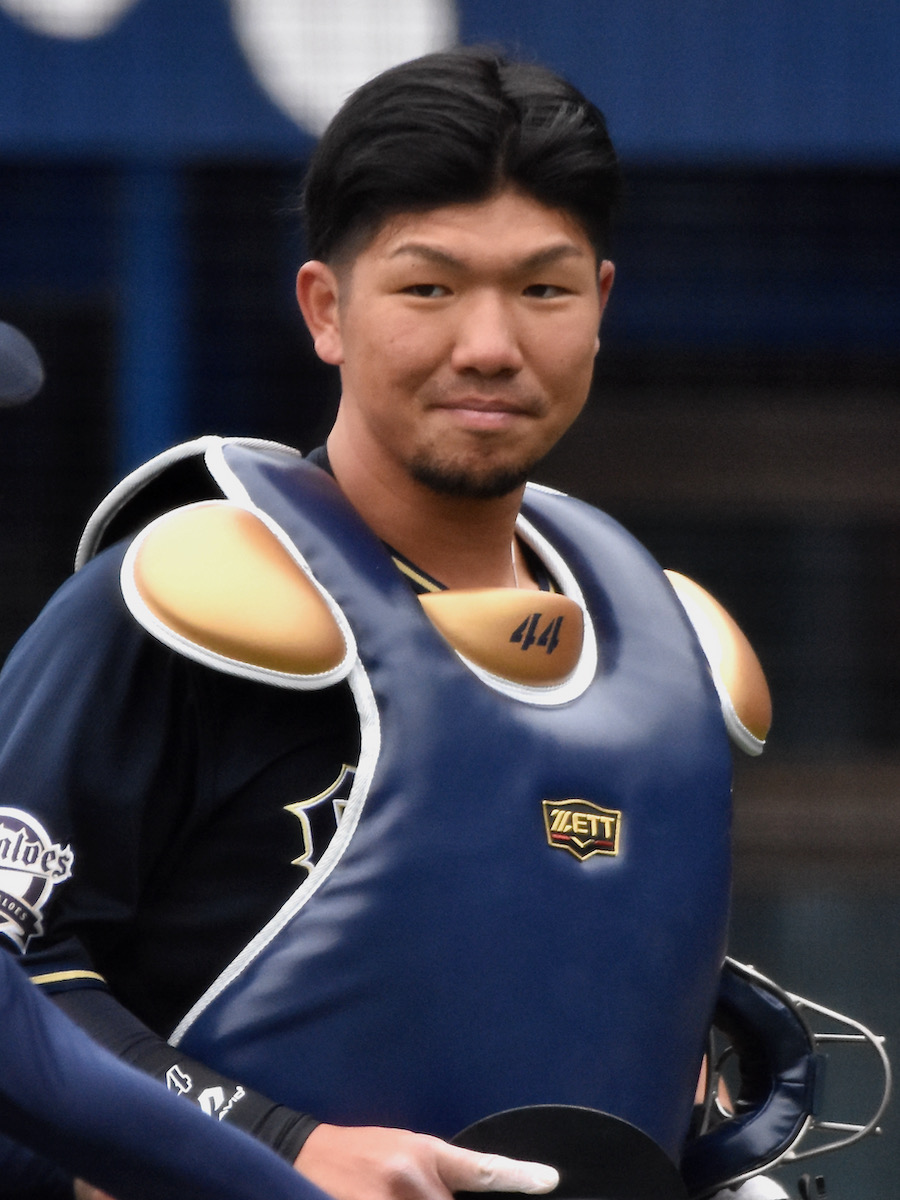
- Tongu with the Orix Buffaloes

Orix Buffaloes – No. 44
- Catcher / Infielder
- Born: November 17, 1996 (age 29); Bizen, Okayama, Japan
- Bats: Right Throws: Right

NPB debut
- March 29, 2019, for the Orix Buffaloes

NPB statistics (through 2025 season)
- Batting average: .249
- Home runs: 57
- Run batted in: 196
- Stats at Baseball Reference

Teams
- Orix Buffaloes (2019–present)

Career highlights and awards
- Japan Series champion (2022); 2x NPB All-Star (2023, 2025); Pacific League Best Nine Award (2023); Pacific League Batting Leader (2023)

Yuma Tongu (頓宮 裕真, Tongu Yuma; born November 17, 1996) is a Japanese professional baseball player for the Orix Buffaloes of Nippon Professional Baseball (NPB). He plays catcher and infielder, specifically on every infield position outside of shortstop.

== Biography ==
In elementary school, Tongu was friends and teammates with future Buffaloes teammate Yoshinobu Yamamoto, and at the time, Yamamoto also played catcher, so both played catch with each other.

He is often nicknamed "Yumer", as he chose the number 44 used by former Hankyu Braves foreign slugger Greg "Boomer" Wells. When he picked it, he stated that he wanted to be called that once he lived up to the number 44. Eventually, he also got one of Wells's gloves, which he said he would treat like a family heirloom.
