= Shoki Murakami =

Japanese baseball player (born 1998)

Shōki Murakami
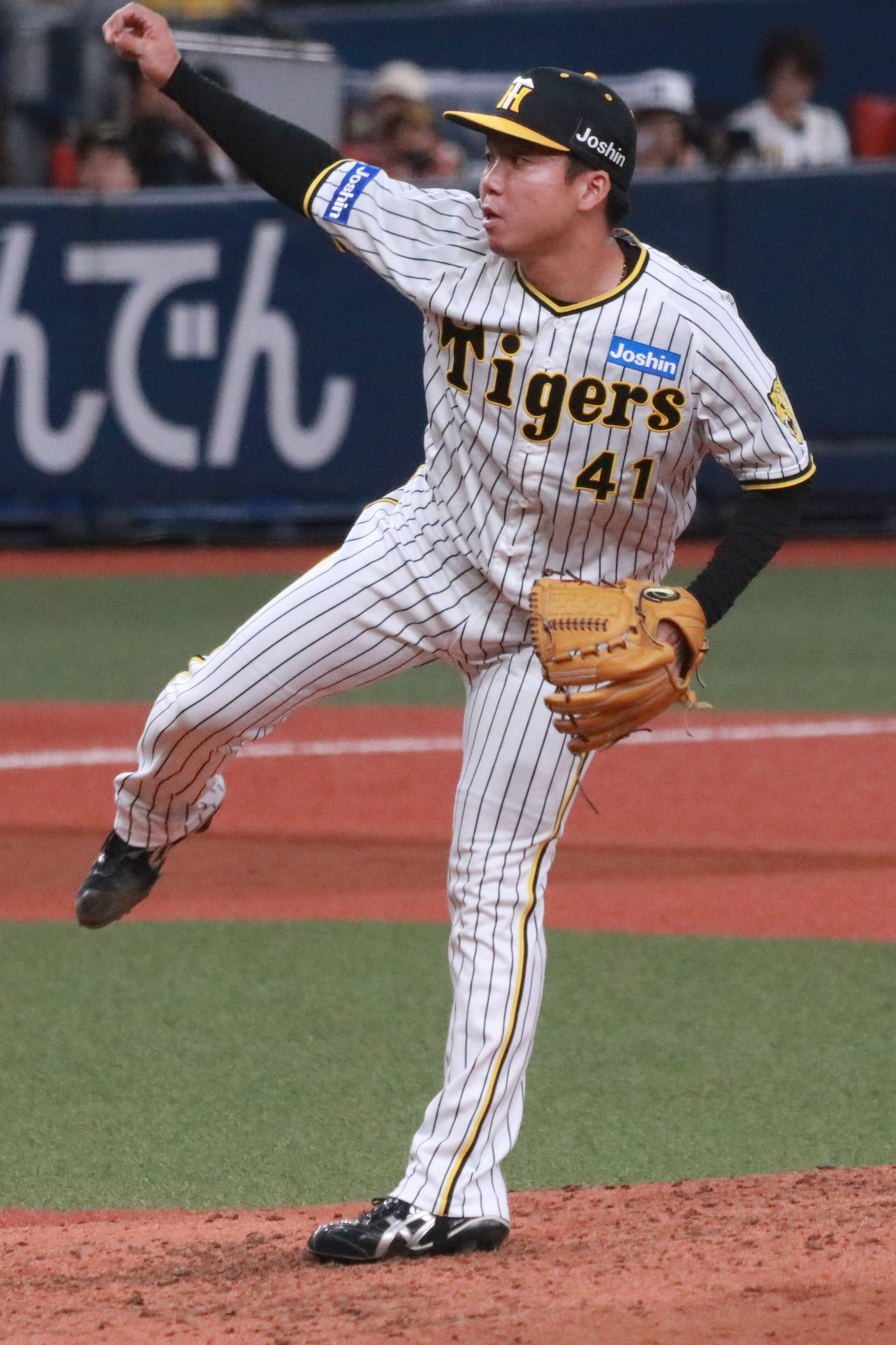
- Murakami with the Hanshin Tigers

Hanshin Tigers – No. 41
- Pitcher
- Born: June 25, 1998 (age 27); Mihara District, Hyōgo, Japan
- Bats: Left Throws: Right

NPB debut
- May 30, 2021, for the Hanshin Tigers

NPB statistics (through 2025 season)
- Win–loss record: 31-22
- Earned Run Average: 2.31
- Strikeouts: 411
- Stats at Baseball Reference

Teams
- Hanshin Tigers (2021–present)

Career highlights and awards
- 1× Japan Series Champion (2023); 1× Central League MVP (2023); Central League Rookie of the Year (2023); 1× Central League ERA leader (2023); 2× NPB All-Star (2023, 2025)

Shōki Murakami (村上 頌樹, Murakami Shōki; born June 25, 1998) is a Japanese professional baseball pitcher for the Hanshin Tigers of Nippon Professional Baseball (NPB).

He is a joint-record holder of the most consecutive scoreless innings pitched in a single season (31 innings) for the Central League, tied with Oetsu Nakai who notched the same for the Tigers in 1963. He is also the only Central League rookie ever to be awarded Rookie of the Year and League MVP in the same season, in his rookie year in 2023.

== Early baseball career ==
Shoki played little league baseball from 1st grade for Kashu Elementary School in Hyogo Prefecture. He started pitching from 3rd grade and continued pitching for Nandan Junior High. He then enrolled at Chiben Gakuen High School, a known baseball powerhouse in the neighboring Nara Prefecture. As the team's ace in his senior year, he singlehandedly pitched 5 games in the Spring Koshien Tournament of 2016 and recorded a 0.38 ERA in 47 innings. During the tournament's championship match with Takamatsu Shogyo High, he not only pitched 11 innings with a lone earned run, he scored the walk-off hit to end the game and earn his school their first Koshien championship. They however lost in the 2nd round of that same year's summer tournaments.

The following year, he entered Toyo University in Tokyo and continued to pitch in the Tohto University Baseball League while studying Informatics. He notched his first shutout win against Senshu University as a freshman, but did not get to take the mound much as a sophomore. He finished his junior year with 6-0 record and a 0.77 ERA, and was awarded both a pitching triple crown and Best Nine, contributing to his team's three-peat spring league victories. He was also chosen to pitch for the national team for the 2019 US-Japan Collegiate Baseball Championships during the summer. In the fall of 2020, he tore a muscle on his pitching arm during the season-opener against Chuo University and left the game after four innings with one run allowed. This was also his last outing in the league.

== Professional career ==
He was the Tiger's 5th round pick at the 2020 Nippon Professional Baseball draft. He signed a 40 million yen contract with the Tigers for an estimated annual salary of 7.2 million. He was assigned the jersey number 41.

2021

He started the season well in the Western League games (farm), with 2-1 and 2.25 ERA in 6 outings that got him promoted to the main squad on May 30 to start against the Seibu Lions. His debut was a disaster however, giving away 3 hits, 3 walks and 5 runs in less than 3 innings before he got taken off the mound. While he did not earn the loss as the Tigers came from behind a few innings later, he got sent back to the farms and stayed there until he was given another chance on August 28 against the Carps. This outing was as disastrous as the last, where he gave away another 5 runs in 3 innings. This ended his season with the main squad, and he spent the remainder in the farms where he topped the league in wins (10-1), ERA (2.23) and win percentage.
