= Kohei Azuma =

Japanese baseball player (born 1999)

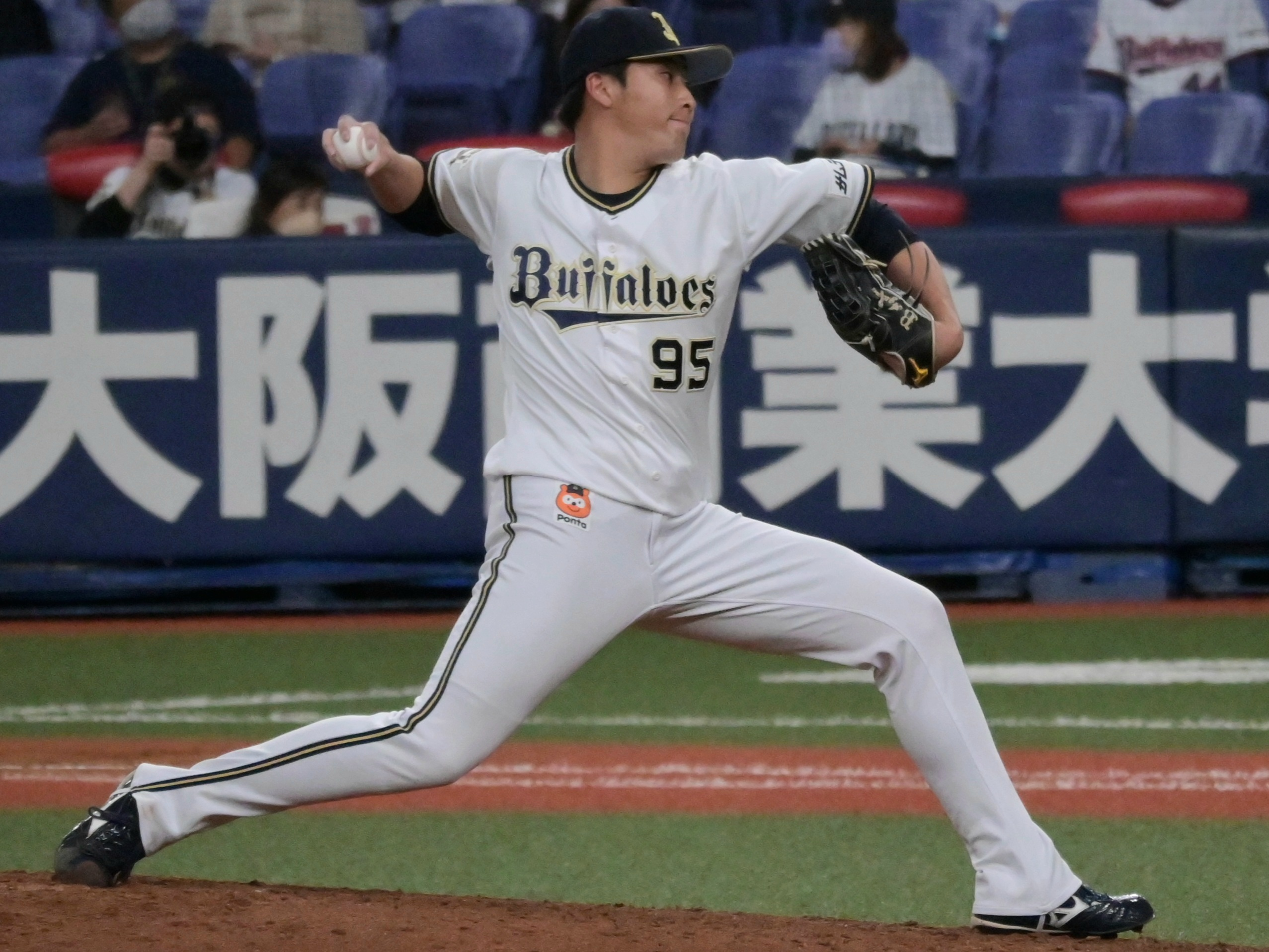

Orix Buffaloes – No. 12
- Pitcher
- Born: December 14, 1999 (age 26); Ono, Hyōgo, Japan
- Bats: Right Throws: Right

NPB debut
- July 30, 2022, for the Orix Buffaloes

Career statistics (through 2023 season)
- Win–loss record: 7-0
- Earned Run Average: 2.62
- Strikeouts: 47
- Saves: 0
- Holds: 0

Teams
- Orix Buffaloes (2018–present)

Kohei Azuma (東 晃平, Azuma Kohei; born December 14, 1999 in Ono, Hyōgo, Japan) is a professional Japanese baseball player. He plays pitcher for the Orix Buffaloes.
