= Masashi Ito (baseball) =

Japanese baseball player (born 1996)

Masashi Itō
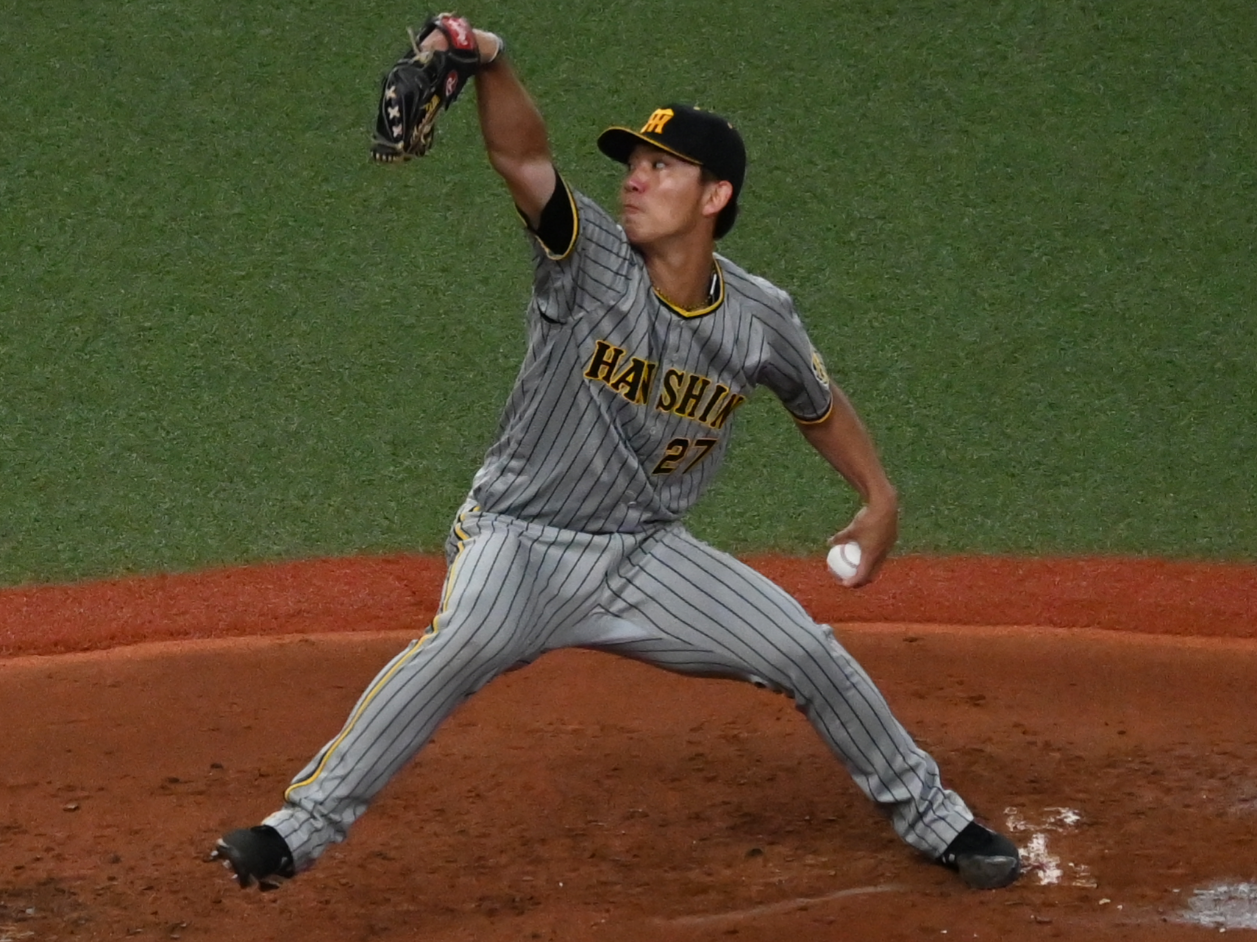

Hanshin Tigers – No. 27
- Pitcher
- Born: May 8, 1996 (age 29); Yokoshibahikari, Chiba
- Bats: Left Throws: Left

NPB debut
- March 31, 2021, for the Hanshin Tigers

Career statistics (through 2024 season)
- Win–loss record: 33–22
- ERA: 2.80
- Strikeouts: 295
- Stats at Baseball Reference

Teams
- Hanshin Tigers (2021–present)

Career highlights and awards
- 1× NPB All-Star (2022); 1× Japan Series Champion (2023)

Masashi Itō (伊藤 将司, Itō, Masashi; born May 8, 1996 in Yokoshibahikari, Chiba) is a Japanese professional baseball pitcher who currently plays for the Hanshin Tigers of Nippon Professional Baseball.

== Early baseball career ==
Masashi started as a little league pitcher for the Yokoshiba Phoenix baseball team in his hometown in Chiba. He continued to pitch for Yokoshibahikari Junior High, and helped his team win the prefectural championship in his 3rd year.

He entered Yokohama High School in the neighboring prefecture of Kanagawa, where he became the baseball team's ace pitcher in his 2nd year. He helped his school make it all the way to the 2013 Summer Koshien tournaments, where he pitched a complete game (14 KOs, 1 earned run) to defeat Marugame High in the 2nd round. But due to overexertion in this game, he strained his shoulders and they lost the next round to Toko Gakuen. They also made it to the 2014 Spring Koshien, but got defeated in the first round when he gave away 7 runs.

After high school, he returned to Chiba to enroll in International Budo University, where he joined the baseball team as a reliever. He eventually became the team's ace in his 2nd year and participated in the Sendai Big-Six league tournaments. In addition to notching 6 wins including 3 shutouts in league games, he was selected to play for the national team during the 2019 Japan-USA Collegiate Baseball Championship series. In his 3rd year, he was again selected to play for Samurai Japan in the Baseball at the 2017 Summer Universiade where Japan finished first. In the league games, he won 4 titles including league MVP and most pitching wins, and contributed to his team finishing 2nd overall. But due to an injury in his pitching arm at the start of his senior year, he got very little play time and his prospects of getting drafted after graduation became very slim. He finished college with a record of 24–5, 92 KOs and a 1.92 ERA in 50 league appearances.

When he went undrafted, he joined JR East to play in the industrial leagues. In his first year, despite pitching 3 scoreless innings in relief during the 2019 Intercity Baseball Tournament, their team lost due to run deficit. After this, he began weight training to improve his overall strength. On October 5, 2020 during the Tokyo-wide eliminations, he almost pitched a no-hitter against NTT East Japan right until the bottom of the 9th. He earned a complete shutout win and finished the game after surrendering only a single hit. After he got drafted by the Tigers in November, he also pitched another complete win (2 earned runs) against soon-to-be Tigers teammate Takumu Nakano of Mitsubishi Motors Okazaki during the intercity tournament, but his team lost in the succeeding round.

== Hanshin Tigers ==
He was the Tiger's 2nd round pick during the November 2020 Nippon Professional Baseball draft. He signed a 70 million yen contract with Hanshin, for an estimated annual salary of 13 million yen. He was assigned jersey number 27.

== Pitching style ==
A 5'10 southpaw pitcher with three quarters delivery, he throws a four-seam fastball as his main pitch (maxed at 146 km/h (91 mph)), coupled with a cutter, a two-seamer, slider and an occasional forkball and changeup. He has been shown to have good control in throwing low trajectory pitches.
