= 2021 Central League Climax Series =

First stage
Team (Wins)		Manager	Season
Yomiuri Giants (2)		Tatsunori Hara	61–62–20 (.496), 11.5 GB
Hanshin Tigers (0)		Akihiro Yano	77–56–10 (.579), 0 GB
- Dates: November 6–7

Final stage
Team (Wins)		Manager	Season
Tokyo Yakult Swallows (3)		Shingo Takatsu	73–52–18 (.584), 0 GA
Yomiuri Giants (0)		Tatsunori Hara	61–62–20 (.496), 11.5 GB
- Dates: November 10–12
- MVP: Yasunobu Okugawa (Yakult)

The 2021 Central League Climax Series (CLCS) was a set of two consecutive playoff series in Nippon Professional Baseball (NPB). The First Stage began on November 6 and the Final Stage concluded on November 12. The First Stage was a best-of-three series between the second-place Hanshin Tigers and the third-place Yomiuri Giants. The Final Series was a best-of-six with the Tokyo Yakult Swallows, the Central League champion, being awarded a one-win advantage against the Giants, the winner of the First Stage. The Swallows advanced to the 2021 Japan Series to compete against the Orix Buffaloes, the 2021 Pacific League Climax Series winner.

== Background ==
In 2020, the COVID-19 pandemic delayed the start of the Nippon Professional Baseball (NPB) season causing the Central League (CL) to cancel their Climax Series entirely. The Central League Climax Series (CLCS) returned in 2021, however, as with games during the regular season, no extra innings were played due to pandemic restrictions, resulting in games being called draws after nine innings instead of the usual twelve. As always, if a series ended in a tie, the higher-seed team advanced. Additionally, attendance was also limited to the games for safety reasons. Contests held at Koshien Stadium gave groups of up to four people an additional seat to increase spacing between fans. Yakult sold up to approximately 20,000 tickets per game at Meiji Jingu Stadium, with the CLCS Final Stage selected by the government to test the admission of people showing proof of COVID-19 vaccination or a negative test result. JERA sponsored the naming rights for the series, and it was officially known as the "2021 JERA Climax Series CE".

The Hanshin Tigers were in first place for nearly the entire first half of the season. By the last week of the season, the team was involved in the pennant race but ultimately fell short. The Yomiuri Giants, conversely, struggled at the end of the season. They lost 10-straight decisions in October and fought off the Hiroshima Toyo Carp for the third and final Climax Series slot. They finished the season with a .496 winning percentage, becoming only the sixth team to advance to the Climax Series with a losing record. In the 25 regular season games between Hanshin and Yomiuri, the Tigers defeated the Giants with a 13–9–3 record and finished the season 11 games ahead. Previously, the two teams met in the Climax Series a total of four times, twice in the First Stage and twice in the Final Stage with Yomiuri winning three of the four.

On October 26, for the second time in their history, the Tokyo Yakult Swallows clinched the CL pennant after finishing in last place the previous season. The championship was their first league title since 2015 and eighth overall. For several games in August and September, Yakult was forced to play their home games in Tokyo Dome instead of their home stadium of Meiji Jingu Stadium due to Jingu's proximity to the 2020 Summer Olympics and Paralympic games. Dramatic improvement to the Swallows pitching played a large part in the team's turnaround. The championship advanced the Swallows directly to the Final Stage of the Climax Series to host the Giants, the eventual winner of the First Stage. The two teams split the season series 11–11–3, with Swallows and finishing 11 games ahead of Yomiuri. Previously, the two teams met in the Climax Series a total of three times, twice in the First Stage, once in the Final Stage, with Yakult winning two of the three.

== First stage ==
=== Summary ===
Yomiuri won the series, 2–0.

Game	Date	Score	Location	Time	Attendance
1	November 6	Yomiuri Giants – 4, Hanshin Tigers – 0	Koshien Stadium	3:11	21,478
2	November 7	Yomiuri Giants – 4, Hanshin Tigers – 2	Koshien Stadium	3:33	21,492

=== Game 1 ===
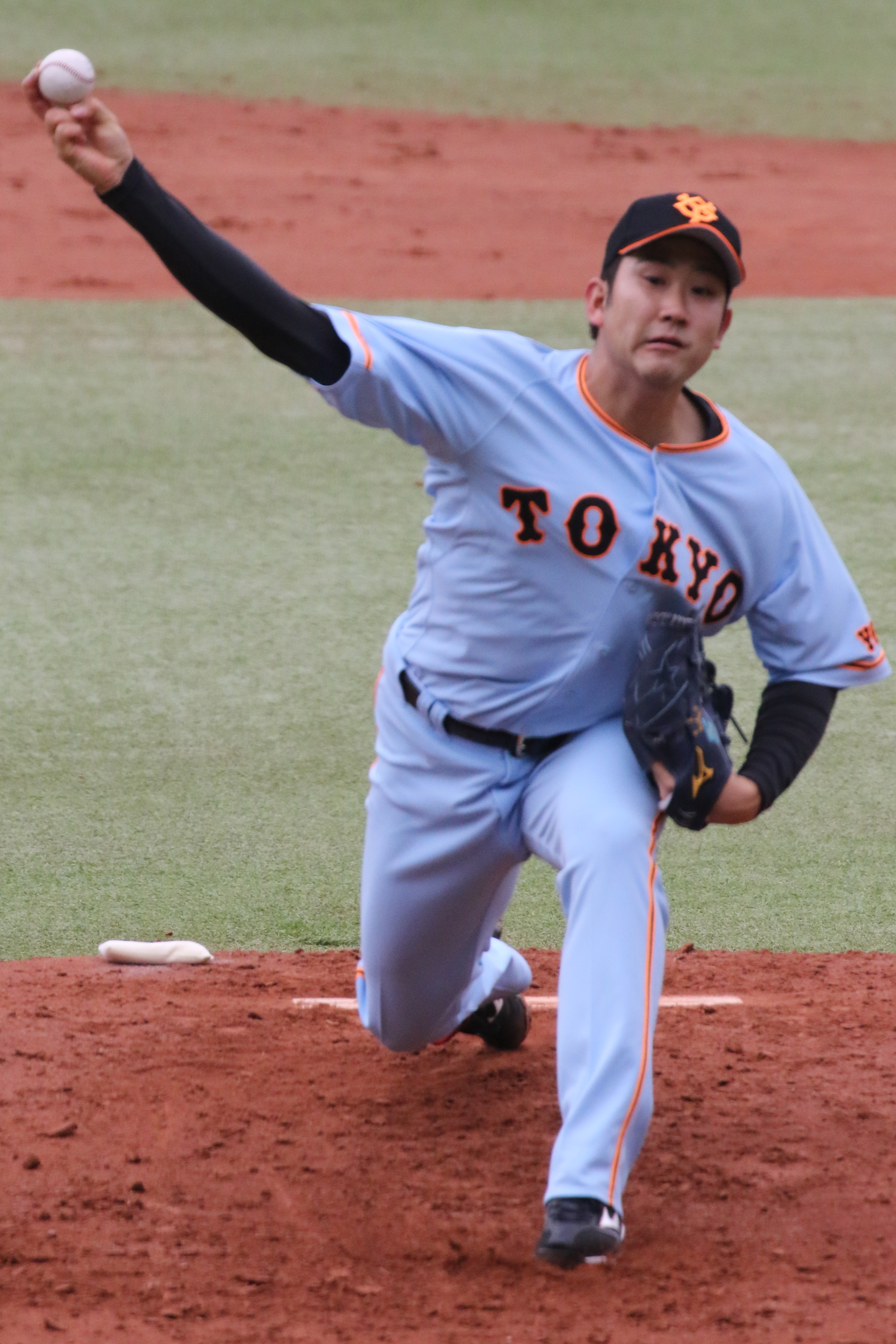
Tomoyuki Sugano pitched seven scoreless innings in his Game 1 win.

Saturday, November 6, 2021, 2:00 pm (JST) at Koshien Stadium in Nishinomiya, Hyōgo Prefecture
Team	1	2	3	4	5	6	7	8	9	R	H	E
Yomiuri	0	0	0	0	1	2	0	1	0	4	9	0
Hanshin	0	0	0	0	0	0	0	0	0	0	5	0
WP: Tomoyuki Sugano (1–0) LP: Haruto Takahashi (0–1) Sv: Seishu Hatake (1); Attendance: 21,478; Boxscore

The starting pitchers for Game 1 were Haruto Takahashi for Hanshin and Tomoyuki Sugano for Yomiuri. Both pitchers kept the teams scoreless until the fifth inning when Zelous Wheeler laid down a sacrifice bunt to advance Yoshihiro Maru who eventually scored on a single by Naoki Yoshikawa, giving the Giants the lead. Wheeler added to the lead the next inning when he hit a two-run double to put Yomiuri up 3–0. In the eighth inning, Wheeler collected his third run batted in (RBI) with a run-scoring single. Sugano pitched seven scoreless innings for the Giants. The Tigers loaded the bases in the ninth inning with two outs against Giants closer Thyago Vieira, however relief pitcher Seishu Hatake induced a line out to earn the save and keep Hanshin scoreless in the loss.

=== Game 2 ===
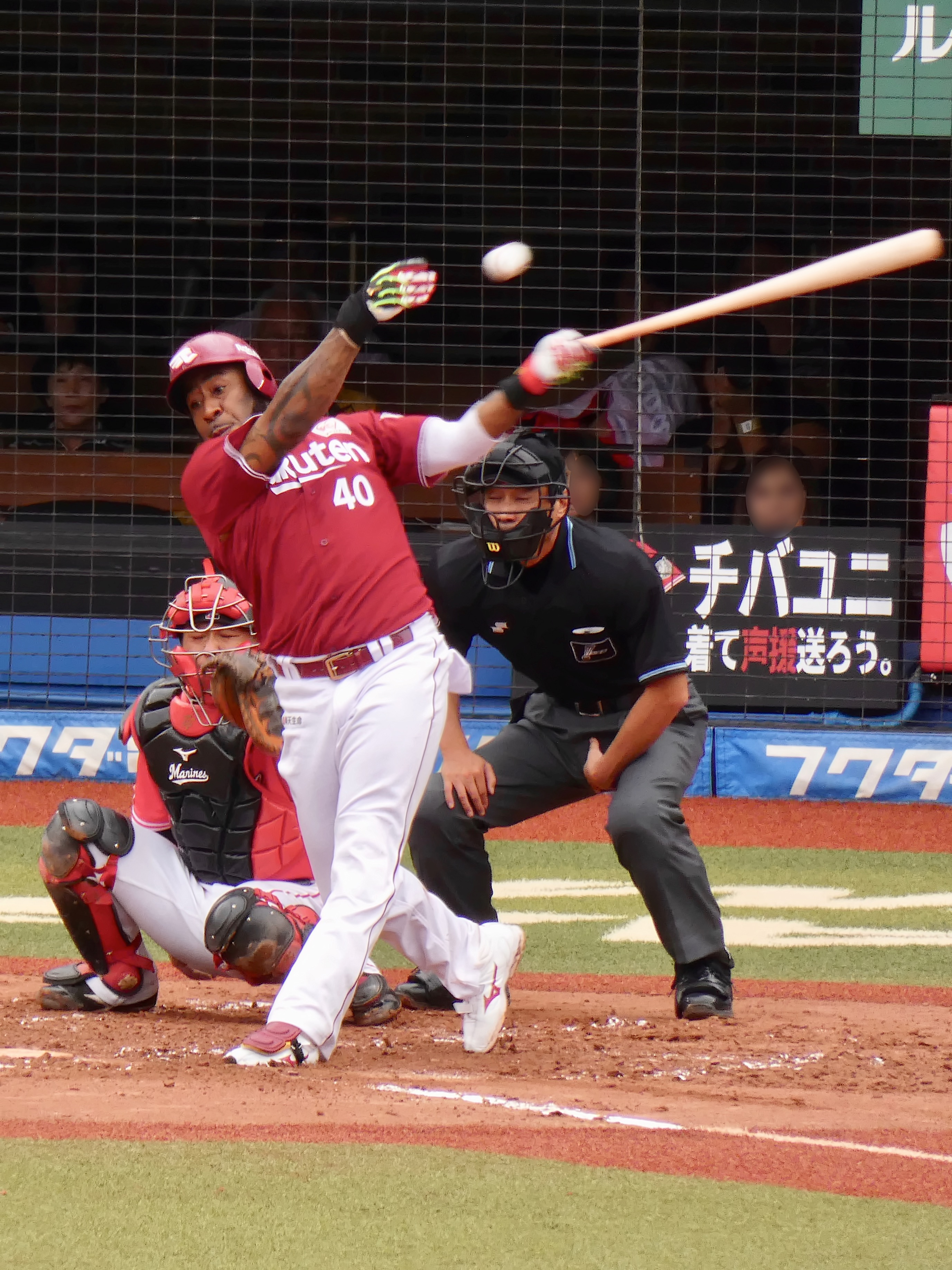
Zelous Wheeler had four RBIs for the series.

Sunday, November 7, 2021, 2:00 pm (JST) at Koshien Stadium in Nishinomiya, Hyōgo Prefecture
Team	1	2	3	4	5	6	7	8	9	R	H	E
Yomiuri	0	0	3	0	0	0	0	1	0	4	7	0
Hanshin	0	2	0	0	0	0	0	0	0	2	11	2
WP: Kyosuke Takagi (1−0) LP: Koyo Aoyagi (0−1) Sv: Thyago Vieira (1); Attendance: 21,492; Boxscore

After being shutout in the first game of the series, Hanshin opened the scoring in Game 2. Giants starter Yuki Takahashi was taken out of the game in the second inning after Ryutaro Umeno doubled and then scored on a double by Teruaki Sato, giving the Tigers the lead. Hanshin added another run that same inning with an RBI-single by Takumu Nakano. The following inning, the Giants loaded the bases with no outs against Hanshin starter Koyo Aoyagi on an error and two singles. A single by Seiya Matsubara scored one run, and a two-run single by Maru gave the Giants the lead and prompted Hanshin to remove Aoyagi from the game. A sacrifice fly in the eighth inning by Wheeler added to the Giants lead, making it 4–2. Hanshin again threatened in the ninth inning with two outs when a Jefry Marté single and a Yusuke Oyama walk put the potential tying runs on base, however Vieira struck out Mel Rojas Jr. to end the game and get the save. In total for the game, the Tigers collected 11 hits and five walks but only scored two runs.

== Final stage ==
=== Summary ===
Yakult won the series, 3–0–1*.

Game	Date	Score	Location	Time	Attendance
1	November 10	Yomiuri Giants – 0, Tokyo Yakult Swallows – 4	Meiji Jingu Stadium	2:38	17,792
2	November 11	Yomiuri Giants – 0, Tokyo Yakult Swallows – 5	Meiji Jingu Stadium	3:19	17,230
3	November 12	Yomiuri Giants – 2, Tokyo Yakult Swallows – 2 (9)	Meiji Jingu Stadium	3:08	19,022

* The Central League regular season champion is given a one-game advantage in the final stage.

=== Game 1 ===
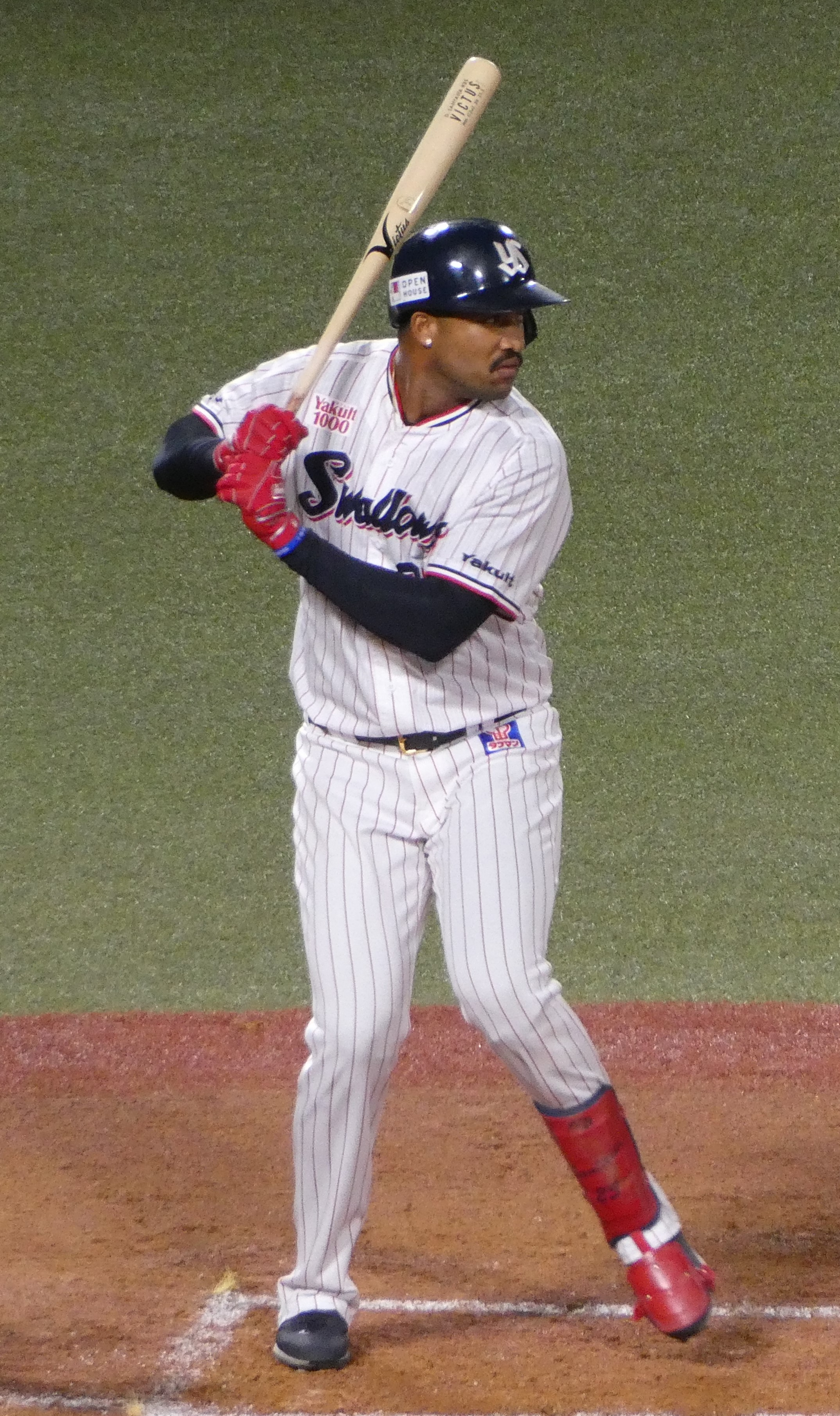
Domingo Santana hit a two-run home run in Game 1.

Wednesday, November 10, 2021, 6:02 pm (JST) at Meiji Jingu Stadium in Shinjuku, Tokyo
Team	1	2	3	4	5	6	7	8	9	R	H	E
Yomiuri	0	0	0	0	0	0	0	0	0	0	6	0
Yakult	3	0	0	0	0	0	1	0	X	4	7	0
WP: Yasunobu Okugawa (1–0) LP: Shun Yamaguchi (0–1); Home runs: YOM: None; YAK: Domingo Santana (1); Attendance: 17,792; Boxscore

To start the bottom of the first inning, Giants starting pitcher Shun Yamaguchi allowed a leadoff double by Yasutaka Shiomi and walked Tetsuto Yamada. After advancing to third, Shiomi scored on a Munetaka Murakami flyout into shallow left. Domingo Santana then hit a two-run home run to extend the Swallows' lead to 3–0. Yakult starter Yasunobu Okugawa went on to pitch a complete game shut out to secure the win. Over the nine-inning game, he struck out nine Yomiuri batters and did not issue a walk on 98 pitches. Yakult added one more run to their lead in the seventh inning after Naomichi Nishiura doubled, advanced to third on a sacrifice bunt, and scored on Shiomi's second double of the game. The win, along with their one-win advantage, gave the Swallows a 2–0 series lead.

=== Game 2 ===
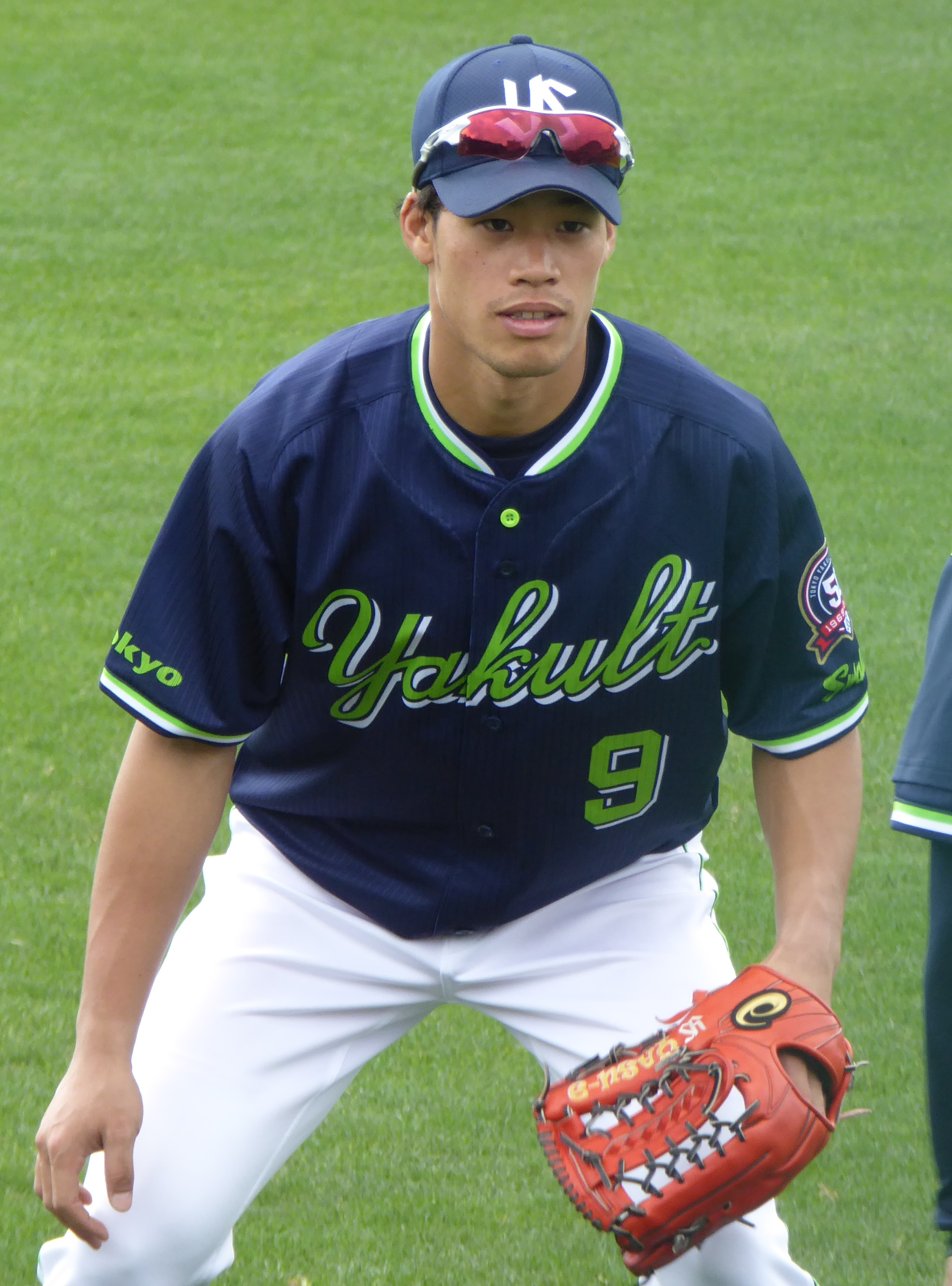
Yasutaka Shiomi hit a three-run triple in Game 2.

Thursday, November 11, 2021, 6:01 pm (JST) at Meiji Jingu Stadium in Shinjuku, Tokyo
Team	1	2	3	4	5	6	7	8	9	R	H	E
Yomiuri	0	0	0	0	0	0	0	0	0	0	2	3
Yakult	0	1	0	0	0	4	0	0	X	5	5	0
WP: Keiji Takahashi (1–0) LP: Tomoyuki Sugano (0–1); Attendance: 17,230; Boxscore

Keiji Takahashi started for the Swallows, while Tomoyuki Sugano started for the Giants. Takahashi worked out of a bases-loaded situation in the first inning and kept Yomiuri scoreless in his six-inning outing. He allowed two hits and walked three batters while striking out eight. Yakult cleanup hitter Murakami singled to open the second inning and, after two walks, scored the game's first run on a sacrifice fly by Nishiura off of Sugano. In the sixth inning, Murakami stretched a singled into a double after the Giants misplayed the ball in the outfield and an error in the infield allowed another runner on with no outs. With two outs and first base open, the Giants intentionally walked the bases loaded before pinch hitter Shingo Kawabata walked to force in a run. Shiomi then hit a three-run triple, making it 5–0. Yakult relief pitchers kept the Giants scoreless to complete the two-hit shutout.

=== Game 3 ===
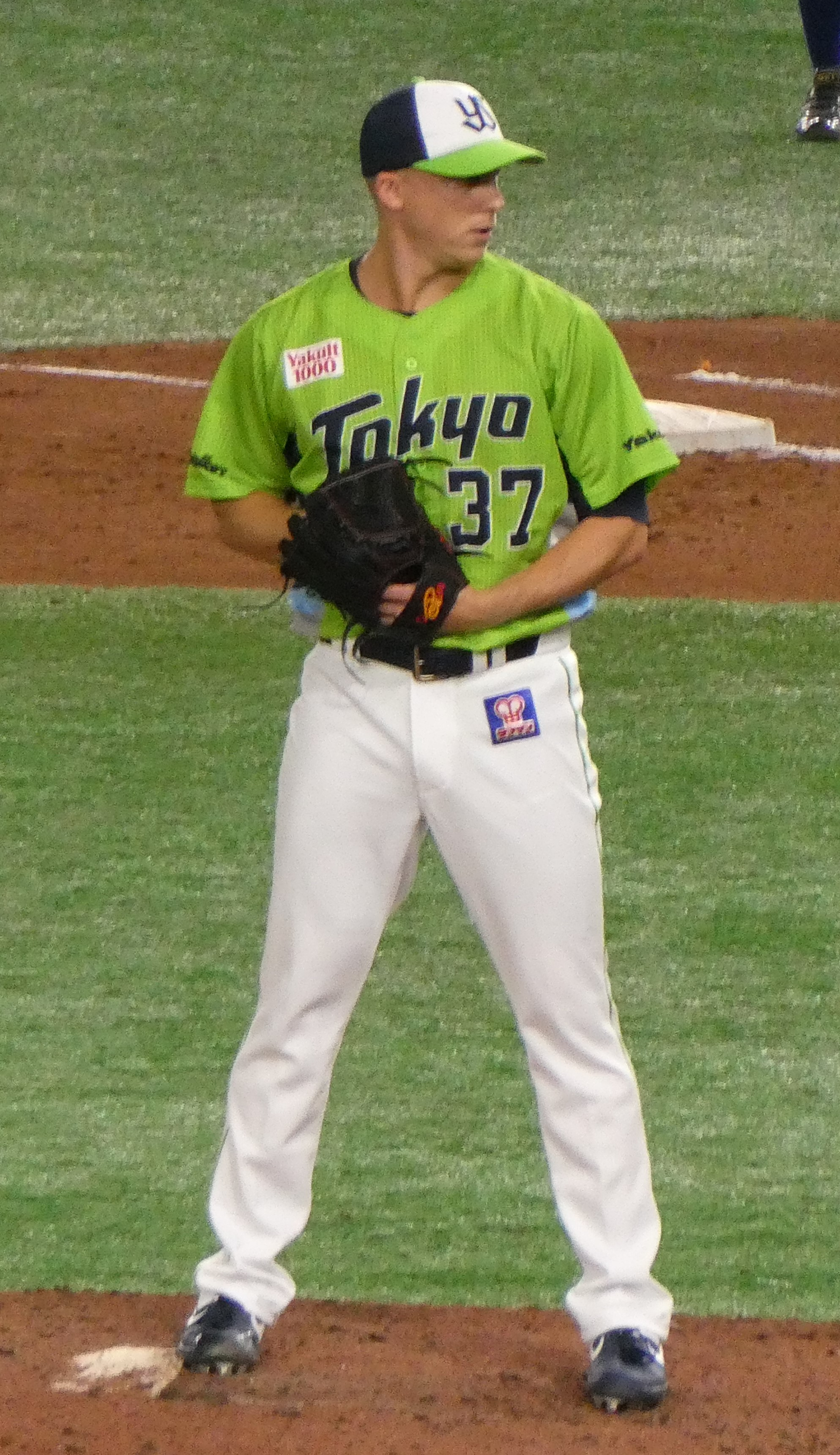
Swallows closer Scott McGough pitched a scoreless ninth inning to secure the tie.

Friday, November 12, 2021, 6:01 pm (JST) at Meiji Jingu Stadium in Shinjuku, Tokyo
Team	1	2	3	4	5	6	7	8	9	R	H	E
Yomiuri	0	0	1	0	0	0	0	1	0	2	7	0
Yakult	0	0	0	0	0	0	2	0	X	2	3	0
Attendance: 19,022; Notes: Extra innings were not played in Climax Series games in 2021 because of pandemic restrictions. If a Climax Series ends in a tie, the higher seed advances, therefore Yakult advanced following this draw as it ensured that Yomiuri could do no better than tie the series. Boxscore

Juri Hara started for the Swallows, while Cristopher Mercedes started for the Giants. Scoring for the first time in the series, Yomiuri opened the scoring in the third inning against Yakult reliever Yuto Kanakubo. Naoki Yoshikawa walked, advanced to third base on a single by Yoshiyuki Kamei, then scored on a sacrifice fly by Hayato Sakamoto. After pitching six scoreless innings, Mercedes was replaced by reliever Rubby De La Rosa, who loaded the bases with two outs in the seventh inning. Norichika Aoki then hit a two-run single off of Giants reliever Kota Nakagawa to give Yakult the lead, 2–1. Yomiuri scored a run next inning against reliever Noboru Shimizu, but left two runners on base at the end of the inning to leave the game tied. With a tie good enough to ensure a series win, Swallows closer Scott McGough got all three Giants batters out in the ninth inning to end the game and the series in favor of Yakult.
