= 2021 Japan Series =

72nd edition of the Japan Series

Team (Wins)	Managers	Season
Tokyo Yakult Swallows (4)	Shingo Takatsu	73–52–18 (.584), 0 GA
Orix Buffaloes (2)	Satoshi Nakajima	70–55–18 (.560), 2.5 GA
- Dates: November 20–27
- MVP: Yuhei Nakamura (Yakult)
- FSA: Yoshinobu Yamamoto (Orix)

Broadcast
- Television: NHK-BS1 (Games 1–6); Fuji TV (Games 1, 4–5); TV Tokyo (Game 2); TV Asahi (Game 3); TBS (Game 6)

The 2021 Japan Series (known as the SMBC Nippon Series 2021 for sponsorship reasons) was the championship series of Nippon Professional Baseball for the 2021 season. The 72nd edition of the Japan Series, it was a best-of-seven playoff between the Orix Buffaloes and Tokyo Yakult Swallows, the winners of the Pacific and Central League's Climax Series, respectively. Both teams were the winners of their respective league's regular season championship.

A mid-season hiatus for the 2020 Summer Olympics and other game postponements required the Japan Series to be pushed back into late November, requiring some games to be played at stadiums other than the team's usual home fields due to scheduling conflicts. The series began on November 20 and concluded on November 27. The Swallows won the series, 4–2. It was their sixth Japan Series title in franchise history and their first since 2001. Yuhei Nakamura of Yakult won the Japan Series Most Valuable Player Award. This would also be the first time since the 2016 Japan Series and the second time since the 2013 Japan Series that there would be a new champion as the Fukuoka SoftBank Hawks failed to qualify for the playoffs. This would also mark the first time since the 2012 Japan Series that a Central League team won the Japan Series. The teams would meet again the following year, but Orix came out on top, 4–2–1.

== Background ==
The Orix Buffaloes finished the regular season in first place to win the Pacific League (PL) pennant, their first league title since 1996 and 13th overall. Orix started the season slow but went on to finish first in interleague play in June. They also won 11 straight winning decisions, their longest streak in 37 years, and spent the majority of the summer in first place. The championship advanced the Buffaloes directly to the Final Stage of the PL Climax Series to host the second-place Chiba Lotte Marines, the winner of the First Stage. The Buffaloes defeated the Marines in the best-of-seven series, winning the series, 3–0–1 (including the one-game advantage).

In the Central League (CL), the Tokyo Yakult Swallows were awarded the league pennant. The championship was their first title since 2015 and eighth overall. The Swallows advanced directly to the Final Stage of the CL Climax Series to host the Yomiuri Giants, the winner of the First Stage. As in the PL Final Stage, Yakult also advanced to the Japan Series by defeating the Giants, also with a 3–0–1 result.

First Stage
Central League
2	Hanshin Tigers	0
3	Yomiuri Giants	2
Pacific League
2	Chiba Lotte Marines	1
3	Tohoku Rakuten Golden Eagles	0

Final Stage
1	Tokyo Yakult Swallows	3
3	Yomiuri Giants	0
1	Orix Buffaloes	3
2	Chiba Lotte Marines	0

Japan Series
CL1	Tokyo Yakult Swallows	4
PL1	Orix Buffaloes	2

== Series notes ==
2021 Japan Series managers

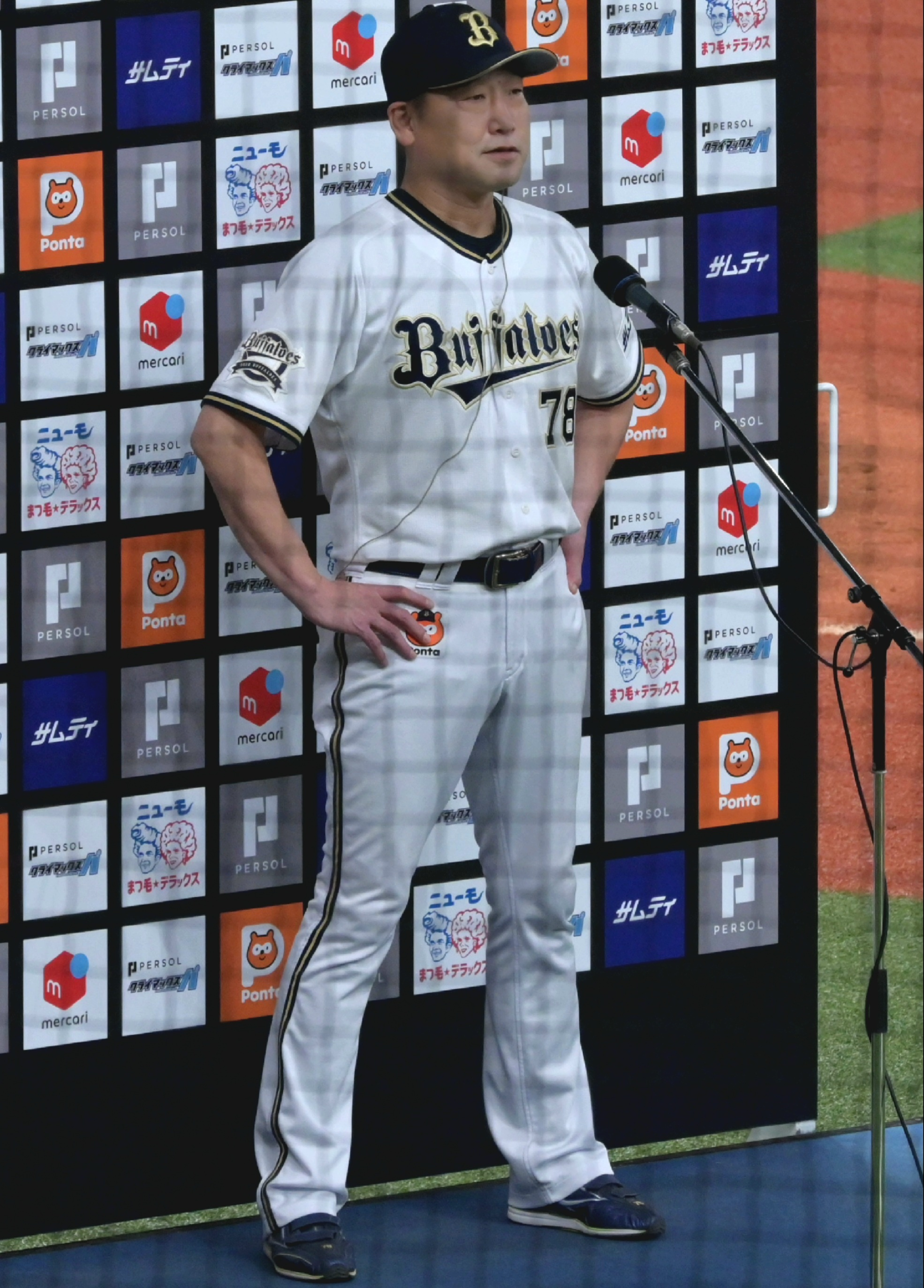
Satoshi Nakajima, Orix

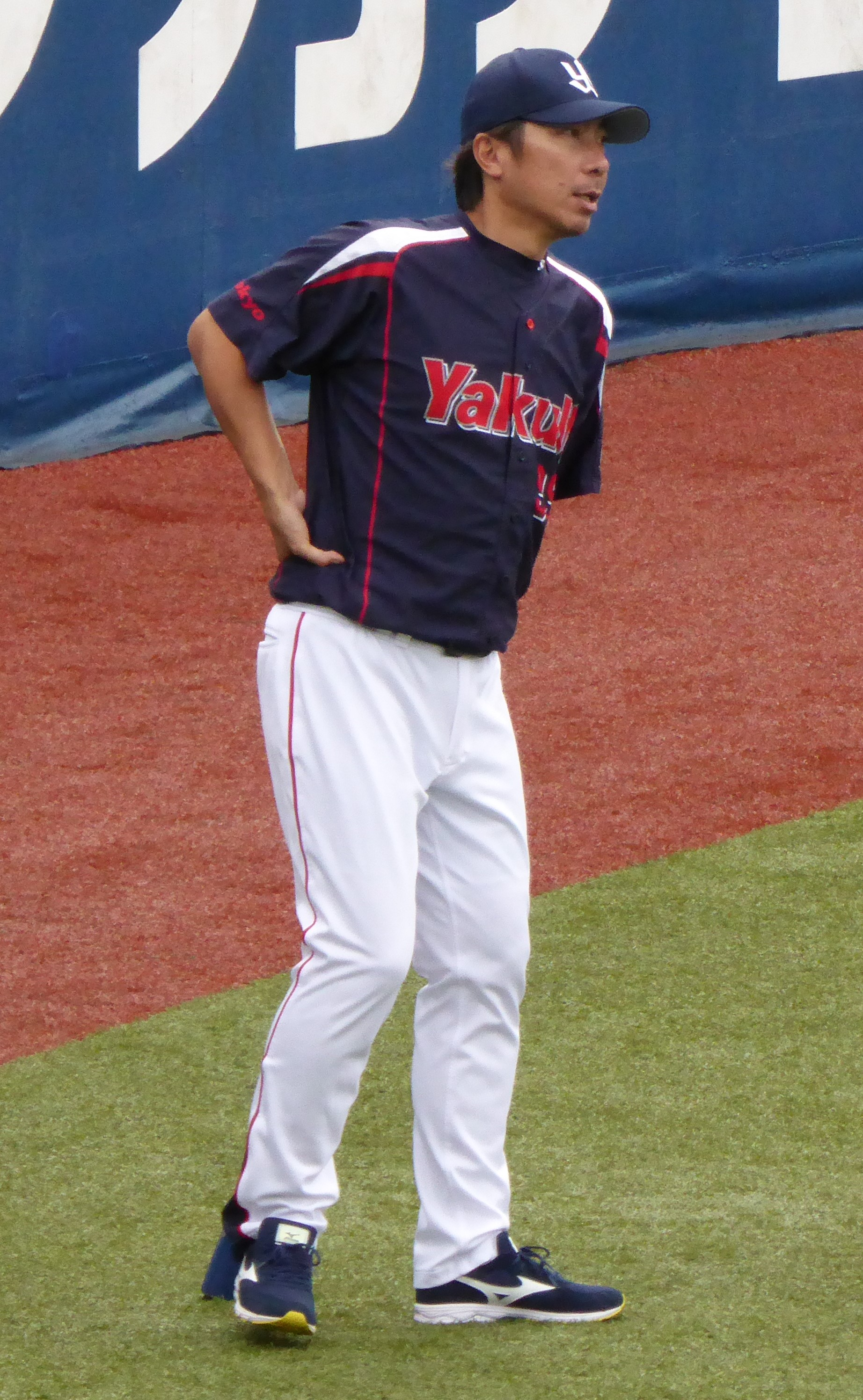
Shingo Takatsu, Yakult

The Buffaloes and Swallows both finished in last place in their respective leagues in the two seasons prior to 2021. It is the first time that the two last-place teams from the previous season played each other in the Japan Series. It is also only the second time since 2010 that the Japan Series didn't feature either the Fukuoka SoftBank Hawks nor the Yomiuri Giants, and the first time since 2016 that the Pacific League representative wasn't the Hawks. Orix's last Japan Series appearance and title was in 1996, when Ichiro Suzuki helped to lead the then-named BlueWave to victory. Since the championship, the team had merged with the Osaka Kintetsu Buffaloes (as part of the 2004 NPB realignment), and the team had finished with a winning record only four times from 2000 to 2020. The Swallows' last Japan Series title came more recently in 2001, against the defunct Osaka Kintetsu Buffaloes, making this matchup, technically speaking, a rematch of the 2001 Japan Series. Yakult also won the Central League title in 2015 and advanced to the 2015 Japan Series, but lost to the Hawks. Since then, Yakult had only one winning season from 2016 to 2020, in 2018, where they were swept by the Yomiuri Giants in the first stage of that year's Climax Series. In their only meeting during interleague play in June, Orix won the series 2–1 The two teams have only met each other in the Japan Series twice: 1978 and 1995, with the Swallows winning both. During the 1995 series, the teams' two current managers, Yakult's Shingo Takatsu and Orix's Satoshi Nakajima, played against each other for their respective teams. Takatsu also recorded a save for the Swallows in the clinching game of the 2001 series against the Kintetsu Buffaloes prior to their merger with the BlueWave.

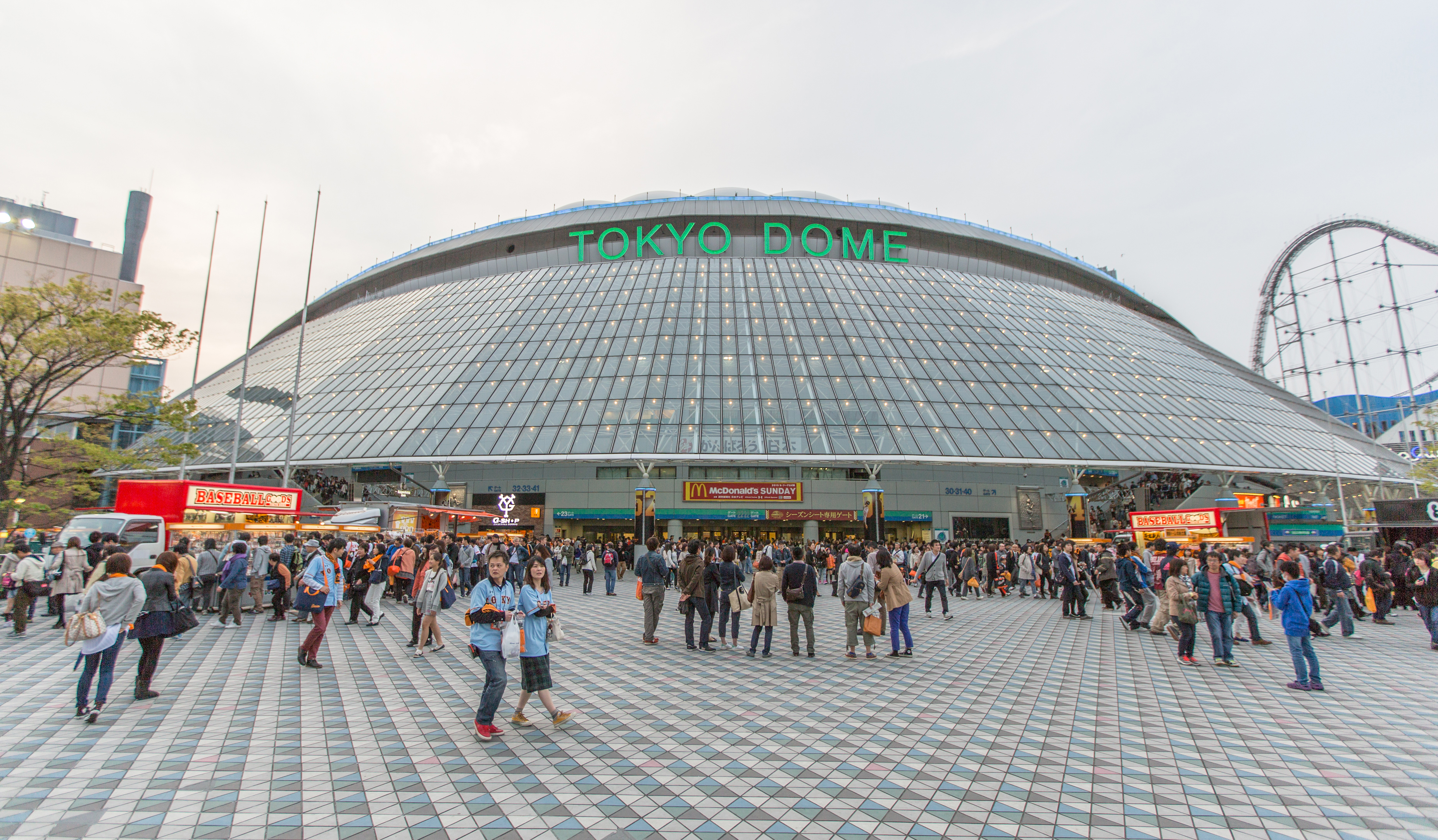
Tokyo Dome served as the Swallows' home field due to a scheduling conflict at Meiji Jingu Stadium.

In mid-July, NPB entered a nearly four-week hiatus so its players could participate in the 2020 Summer Olympics. This break, along with games cancelled or postponed by weather or COVID-19, required the Japan Series to be pushed back into late November. Prior to the start of the series, the two managers did not agree to name probable starting pitchers before each game, the first time since 2017, and therefore the teams were not required to do so. The home field advantage for the Japan Series alternates between the Pacific and Central leagues every year. For this series, it was the PL's turn to hold the advantage, so home field was awarded to the Buffaloes. The three games hosted by Yakult, Games 3–5, were played at Tokyo Dome instead of the Swallows' traditional home field, Meiji Jingu Stadium. With the postseason delayed by one week due to the COVID pandemic, a scheduling conflict arose with an amateur baseball tournament. During the regular season, the Swallows were forced to play several home games in August and September in Tokyo Dome as well because of Jingu's proximity to the Olympics and Paralympic games being held at the time. Additionally, Orix held the last game of the series at Hotto Motto Field in Kobe instead of Kyocera Dome Osaka because of scheduling conflicts with AAA concerts. Hotto Motto Field was the home stadium of the Orix BlueWave before merging with the Kintetsu Buffaloes. After merging, the team split their home games between Kobe and Osaka, however, Orix has played less than ten games in total at the stadium in the previous two seasons. Due to COVID, attendance for the games was limited to 50% of each stadium's maximum capacity, however approximately 6,000 extra fans that could show proof of vaccination were allowed into Games 1 and 3. For the eighth consecutive year, Sumitomo Mitsui Banking Corporation (SMBC) acted as the sponsor and held the naming rights for the Japan Series, which was officially known as the "2021 SMBC Japan Series".

Unlike the 2021 regular season and Climax Series games that ended after nine innings because of COVID-19 restrictions, Japan Series games were allowed to go the regulation limit of 12 innings before concluding with a tie. Game 7 of the Japan Series was set for November 28. The first five games were played in domed stadiums. However, a contingency plan was set by NPB in case Game 6, 7, or potentially 8 were postponed by rain, setting the last possible date of the series for November 30. Under NPB rules, if there was even one tie game, the last day would be November 29 because of a travel day for a possible Game 9 (which has never happened). If Games 6 or 7 were postponed by rain, November 30 would be the last possible date for the series. The Series could not be played into December, unlike Taiwan's CPBL, which established a last possible date of December 5. If inclement weather did not allowed for seven games to be played by November 30, the team with the most wins after the November 30 game was completed would have been declared the winner. If a game needed to be played on November 30 and was tied after 12 innings, the 13th inning onward would have used the World Baseball Softball Confederation's extra innings rule that starts both teams with baserunners on first and second base with no outs, and would have continued until a winner was decided.

== Summary ==
Yakult won the series, 4–2.

Game	Date	Score	Location	Time	Attendance
1	November 20	Tokyo Yakult Swallows − 3, Orix Buffaloes − 4	Kyocera Dome	3:46	19,297
2	November 21	Tokyo Yakult Swallows − 2, Orix Buffaloes − 0	Kyocera Dome	2:56	17,075
3	November 23	Orix Buffaloes − 4, Tokyo Yakult Swallows − 5	Tokyo Dome	3:45	24,565
4	November 24	Orix Buffaloes – 1, Tokyo Yakult Swallows – 2	Tokyo Dome	2:50	20,617
5	November 25	Orix Buffaloes – 6, Tokyo Yakult Swallows – 5	Tokyo Dome	3:16	20,580
6	November 27	Tokyo Yakult Swallows – 2, Orix Buffaloes – 1 (12)	Hotto Motto Field	5:00	15,239

== Game summaries ==
=== Game 1 ===
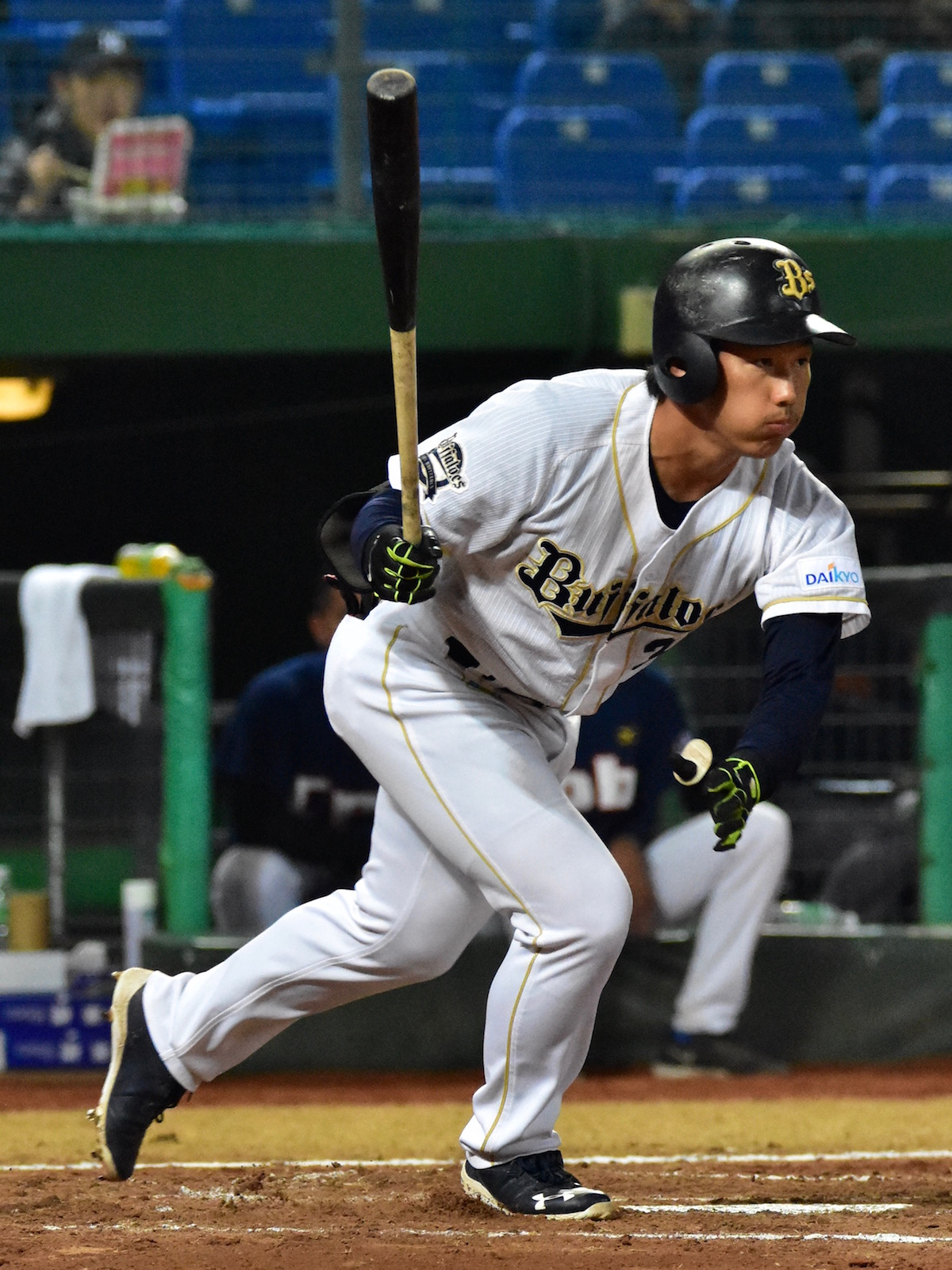
Masataka Yoshida drove in the game-winning run in Game 1.

Saturday, November 20, 2021, 6:05 pm (JST) at Kyocera Dome Osaka in Osaka, Osaka Prefecture
Team	1	2	3	4	5	6	7	8	9	R	H	E
Yakult	0	0	0	0	0	1	0	2	0	3	9	0
Orix	0	0	0	0	0	0	1	0	3X	4	10	1
WP: Motoki Higa (1–0) LP: Scott McGough (0–1); Home runs: YAK: Munetaka Murakami (1); ORX: Steven Moya (1); Attendance: 19,297; Boxscore

The Orix Buffaloes Junior Team threw out Game 1's ceremonial first pitch. Yasunobu Okugawa started for Yakult and Yoshinobu Yamamoto started for Orix. The game was scoreless for five innings, until Yamamoto issued two walks and Yuhei Nakamura hit a run batted in (RBI) single in the sixth inning. Steven Moya tied the game for Orix with a pinch hit home run in the seventh inning, and Yakult took a 3–1 lead in the eighth inning on a two-run home run by Munetaka Murakami. With Yakult closer Scott McGough pitching in the ninth inning, the Buffaloes led off with a single by Kotaro Kurebayashi and a walk by pinch hitter Adam Jones. Shuhei Fukuda then bunted to advance the runners, but McGough's failed attempt to throw out the lead runner at third base left the bases loaded. Yuma Mune then tied the game with a two-RBI single followed by the game-winning RBI double by Masataka Yoshida. Orix's win extended the PL's Japan Series winning streak to 13 games after the Fukuoka SoftBank Hawks swept the previous two series.

=== Game 2 ===
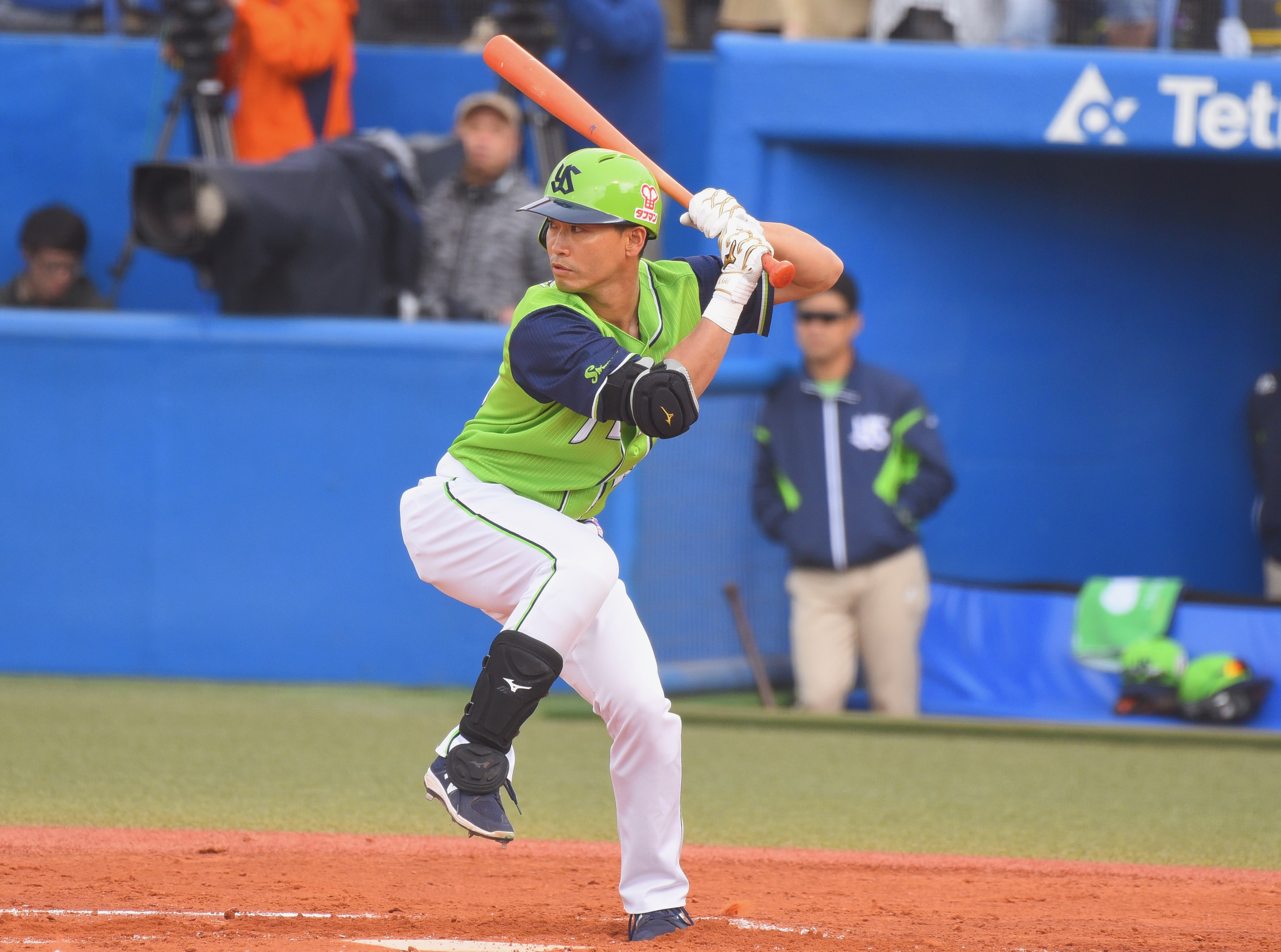
Norichika Aoki's RBI single scored Game 2's first run.

Sunday, November 21, 2021, 6:04 pm (JST) at Kyocera Dome Osaka in Osaka, Osaka Prefecture
Team	1	2	3	4	5	6	7	8	9	R	H	E
Yakult	0	0	0	0	0	0	0	1	1	2	6	0
Orix	0	0	0	0	0	0	0	0	0	0	5	1
WP: Keiji Takahashi (1–0) LP: Hiroya Miyagi (0–1); Attendance: 17,075; Boxscore

Actress Yuriko Yoshitaka threw out the ceremonial first pitch prior to the game. Starting pitchers were Hiroya Miyagi for Orix and Keiji Takahashi for Yakult. The game was scoreless through seven innings, with Miyagi retiring the first 16 batters he faced. In the eighth inning, however, Naomichi Nishiura drew a one-out walk and then Yasutaka Shiomi hit a single with two outs. Norichika Aoki then drove in the first run of the game with an RBI single. Relief pitcher Ryo Yoshida was brought in to replace Miyagi and struck out a batter to end the inning. The Swallows scored again the next inning against reliever César Vargas. Domingo Santana reached second base following a walk and a sacrifice. Orix right fielder Yutaro Sugimoto then misplayed a single by José Osuna that allowed Santana's pinch runner to score. Takahashi pitched in the bottom of the ninth inning and retired all three batters to end the game and earn the win. In his 133-pitch complete game shutout, he struck out five batters while walking two. Yakult's win broke the PL's Japan Series winning streak and was the first CL win since the Hiroshima Toyo Carp in Game 2 of the 2018 Japan Series.

=== Game 3 ===
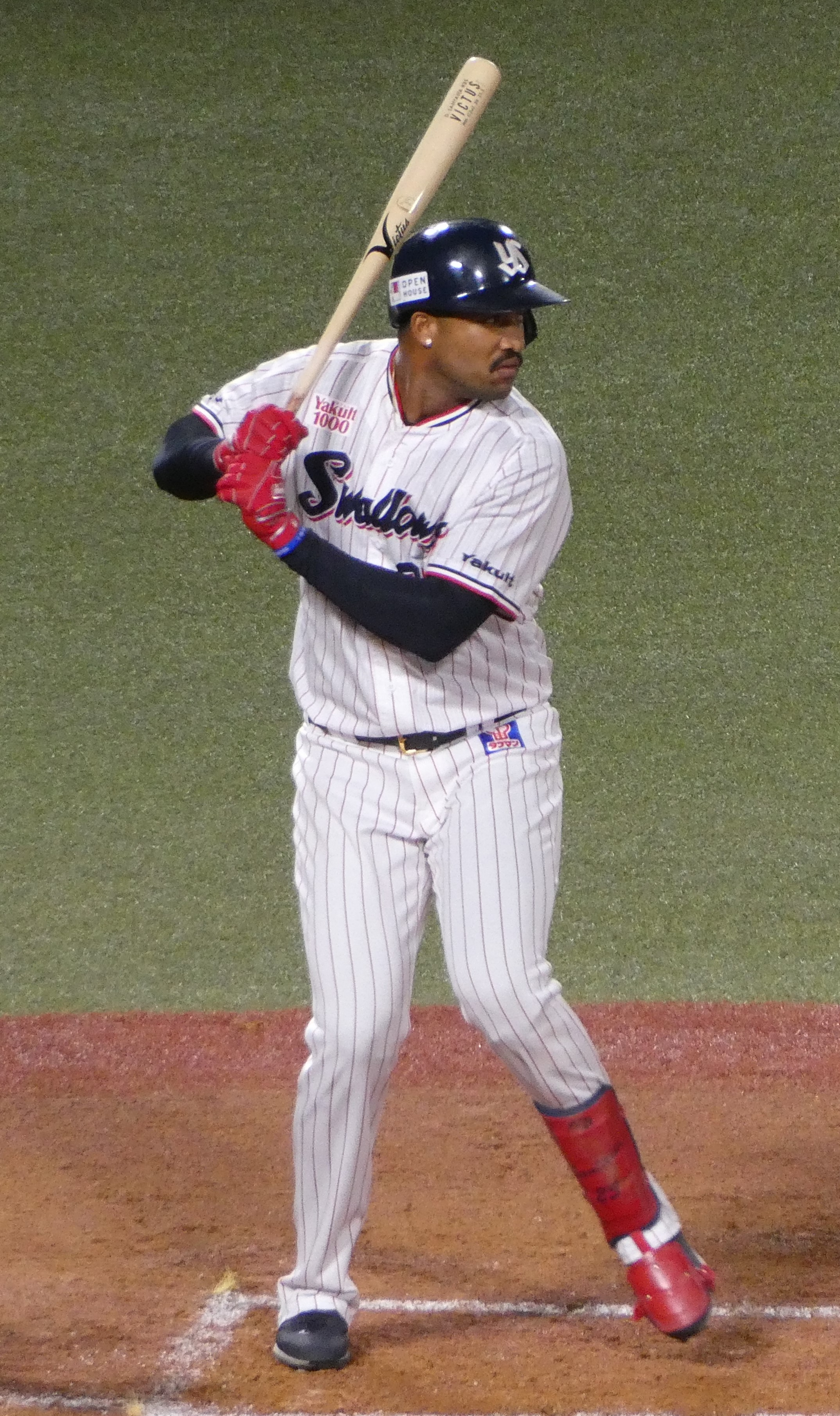
Domingo Santana hit the game-winning home run in Game 3

Tuesday, November 23, 2021, 6:05 pm (JST) at Tokyo Dome in Bunkyō, Tokyo
Team	1	2	3	4	5	6	7	8	9	R	H	E
Orix	0	0	1	0	0	2	1	0	0	4	7	2
Yakult	0	0	0	0	3	0	2	0	X	5	5	1
WP: Taichi Ishiyama (1–0) LP: Ryo Yoshida (0–1) Sv: Scott McGough (1); Home runs: ORX: Yutaro Sugimoto (1); YAK: Domingo Santana (1); Attendance: 24,565; Boxscore

The game's ceremonial first pitch was thrown by former Swallows manager Mitsuru Manaka. In the first of three games played at Tokyo Dome instead of the Swallows' home field of Meiji Jingu Stadium due to a scheduling conflict, Daiki Tajima started for Orix, while Yakult started Yasuhiro Ogawa. Orix scored first on an RBI single by Yuma Mune in the third inning. After Tajima gave up a one-out single in the fifth inning, the Buffaloes replaced him with Motoki Higa, who recorded an out and was quickly relieved by César Vargas. Vargas walked two batters to load the bases and then allowed a single to Yuhei Nakamura that scored two runs. A throwing error by Mune on the play allowed a third run, putting Yakult ahead 3–1. Orix tied the game the next inning on a two-run home run by Yutaro Sugimoto. In the seventh, two walks and a double by Masataka Yoshida gave the Buffaloes a one-run lead. The Swallows responded in the bottom half of the inning with a leadoff single by Nori Aoki followed by a fly out and a strikeout. Domingo Santana then hit a game-winning two-run home run.

=== Game 4 ===
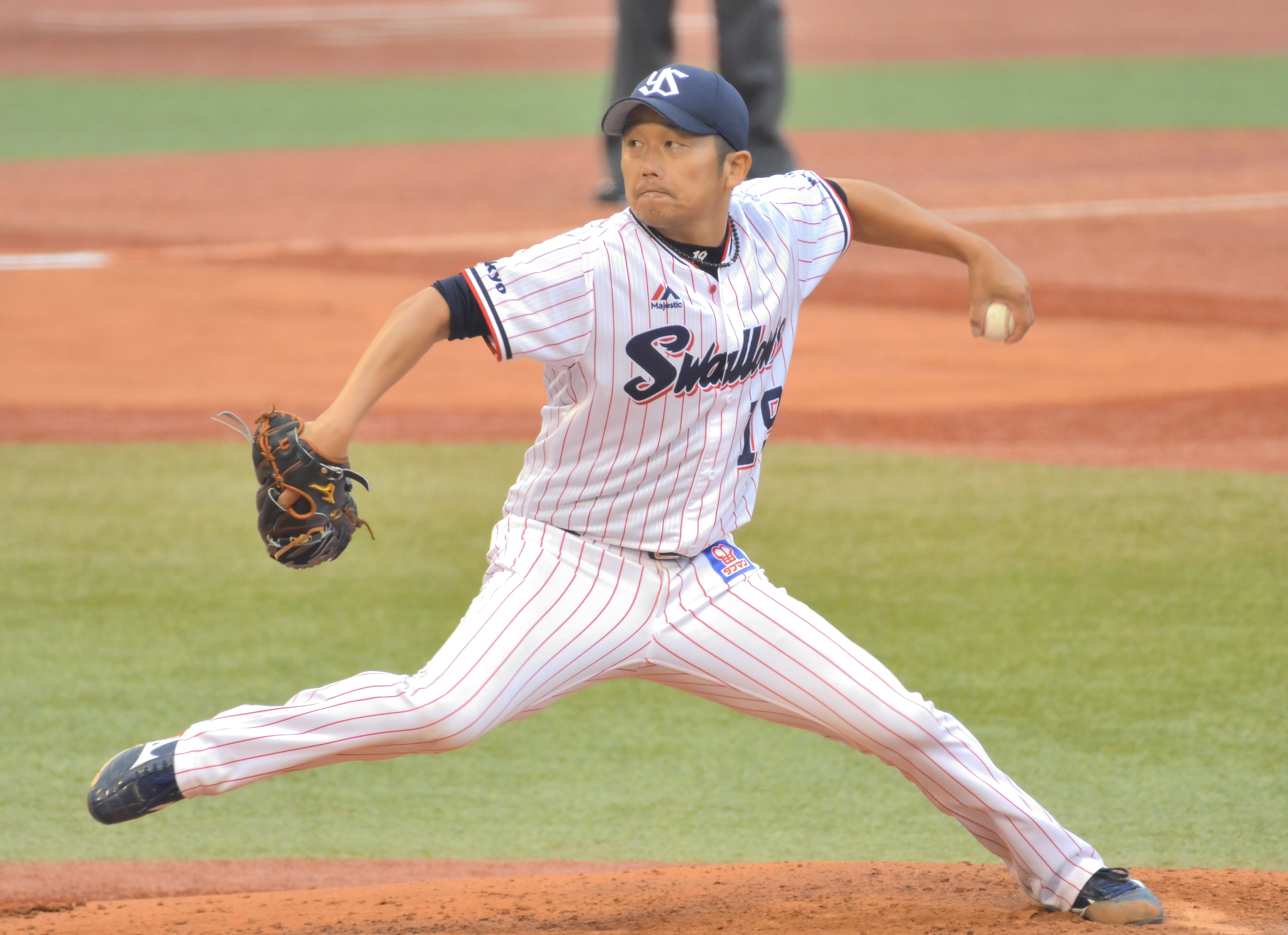
Masanori Ishikawa was the winning pitcher in Game 4.

Wednesday, November 24, 2021, 6:05 pm (JST) at Tokyo Dome in Bunkyō, Tokyo
Team	1	2	3	4	5	6	7	8	9	R	H	E
Orix	0	0	0	0	0	1	0	0	0	1	6	0
Yakult	0	1	0	0	0	1	0	0	X	2	6	1
WP: Masanori Ishikawa (1–0) LP: Hirotoshi Masui (0–1) Sv: Scott McGough (2); Home runs: ORX: None; YAK: Domingo Santana (2); Attendance: 20,617; Boxscore

Para-badminton athlete Hiroshi Murayama threw out the ceremonial first pitch prior to the game. Domingo Santana hit a solo home run for Yakult in the second inning off of Orix starter Soichiro Yamazaki. Swallows starter Masanori Ishikawa allowed only one baserunner from the second through the fifth innings, however Shuhei Fukuda reached base on a two-out single in the sixth inning. He then scored to tie the game on a single by Yuma Mune after Santana couldn't field the ball cleanly in the outfield. In the bottom half of the inning with two outs against Orix reliever Hirotoshi Masui, Santana walked and Yuhei Nakamura hit a single. Masui was replaced by reliever Motoki Higa and José Osuna singled to give the Swallows the lead, 2–1. Yakult relief pitching was able to keep Orix scoreless for the remainder of the game, securing 41-year-old Ishikawa and the Swallows the win.

=== Game 5 ===
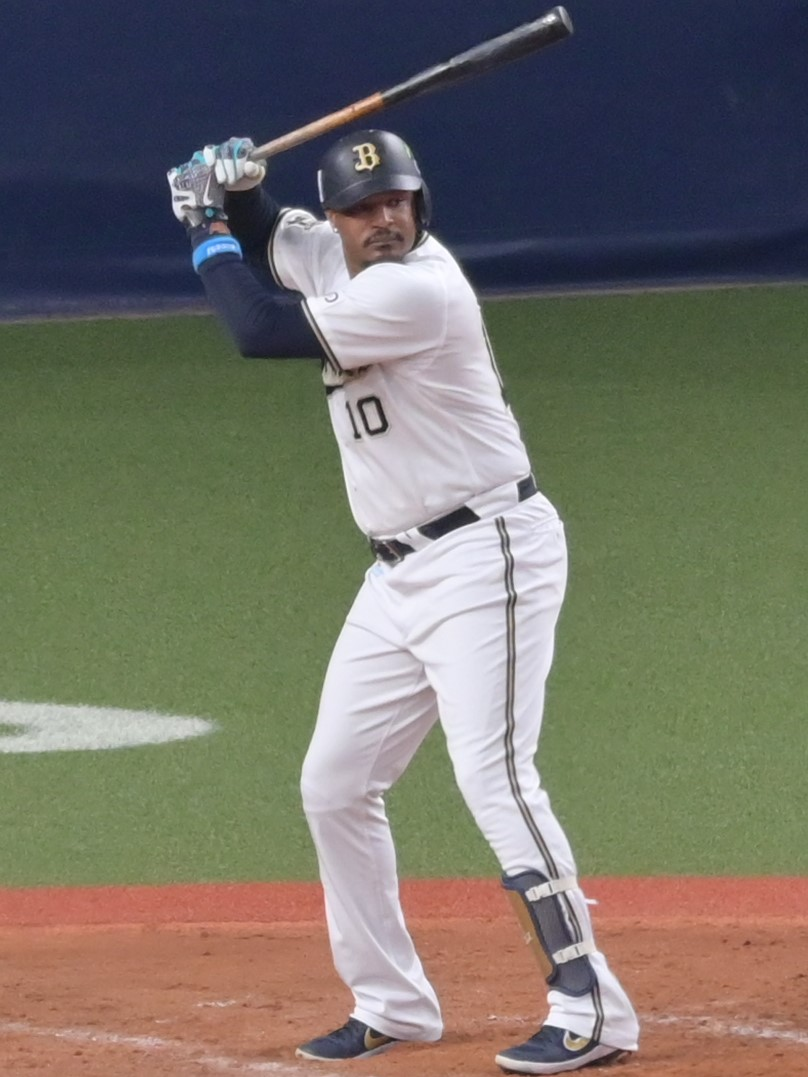
Adam Jones hit the game-winning home run for Orix

Thursday, November 25, 2021, 6:04 pm (JST) at Tokyo Dome in Bunkyō, Tokyo
Team	1	2	3	4	5	6	7	8	9	R	H	E
Orix	0	0	0	1	0	1	2	1	1	6	14	0
Yakult	0	1	0	1	0	0	0	3	0	5	7	1
WP: Taisuke Yamaoka (1–0) LP: Scott McGough (0–2) Sv: Yoshihisa Hirano (1); Home runs: ORX: Adam Jones (1); YAK: Munetaka Murakami (2), Tetsuto Yamada (1); Attendance: 20,580; Boxscore

Juri Hara started Game 5 for Yakult and Sachiya Yamasaki started for Orix; both pitchers allowed two runs in 5 2/3 innings pitched. Domingo Santana scored Yakult's first run in the second inning, and Masataka Yoshida scored for Orix in the fourth inning. Munetaka Murakami hit a home run for Yakult in the bottom of the fourth inning, and Orix tied the game in the sixth inning after Yoshida reached base on an error and back-to-back singles drove him home. With the game tied at 2–2, Orix scored two runs in the seventh inning on a single by Kotaro Kurebayashi, an RBI triple by Ryo Ota, and an RBI pinch hit single by Steven Moya. Orix added another run in the eighth, and Tetsuto Yamada hit a home run for Yakult in the eighth inning to tie the game. Orix pinch-hitter Adam Jones hit the game-winning home run off Yakult closer Scott McGough in the ninth inning.

=== Game 6 ===
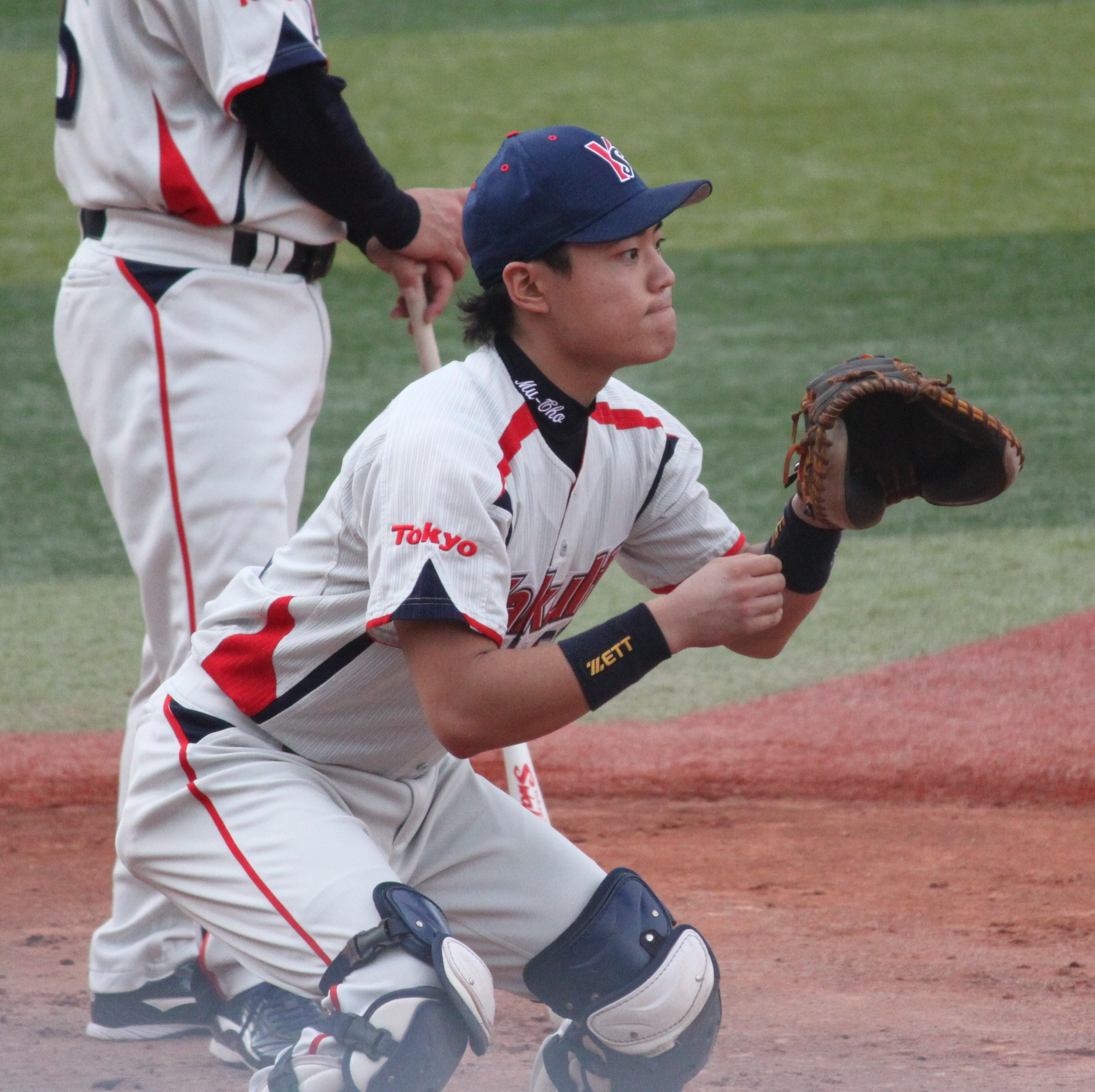
Yuhei Nakamura won the Japan Series Most Valuable Player Award.

Saturday, November 27, 2021, 6:00 pm (JST) at Hotto Motto Field in Kobe, Hyōgo Prefecture
Team	1	2	3	4	5	6	7	8	9	10	11	12	R	H	E
Yakult	0	0	0	0	1	0	0	0	0	0	0	1	2	10	0
Orix	0	0	0	0	1	0	0	0	0	0	0	0	1	7	2
WP: Scott McGough (1–2) LP: Ryo Yoshida (0–2); Attendance: 15,239; Boxscore

In Game 6, Hirotoshi Takanashi started for Yakult and Yoshinobu Yamamoto started for Orix. Both pitchers kept the game scoreless until the fifth inning. José Osuna began the Swallows' half of the inning with a single, advanced to second on a sacrifice bunt, and scored on a single by Yasutaka Shiomi to take the lead. In the bottom half of the inning, Orix catcher Kenya Wakatsuki was ruled out at first base on a ground ball, but the call was overturned on review. After a sacrifice bunt moved Wakatsuki to second base, Shuhei Fukuda drove him home and tied the game with an RBI single. Yakult removed Takanashi from the game after giving up the run. In his outing, he allowed four hits and two walks while striking out seven over 4 2/3 innings. Yamamoto, however, continued to pitch for the Buffaloes. Two Swallows batters reached base on errors to begin the top half of the sixth inning, however, Yakult was unable to score. The game remained tied at 1–1 when Yamamoto was eventually taken out of the game after pitching nine innings and striking out 11 batters on 141 pitches. Swallows reliever Noboru Shimizu kept the Buffaloes scoreless in the bottom half of the inning and the game entered extra innings, a first for the year as games were limited to nine innings during the regular season and Climax Series.

In the top of the final inning (the 12th), Yasutaka Shiomi hit a single with two outs, advanced to second base on a passed ball, and scored when Shingo Kawabata hit a pinch-hit single to score the go-ahead run. Yakult's closer Scott McGough pitched a scoreless inning in the bottom of the 12th inning, earning the win and ending the series. It was the Swallows' sixth Japan Series championship and first since 2001. It was also the first time a Central League team won the series since 2012. Yuhei Nakamura, Yakult's starting catcher, won the Japan Series Most Valuable Player Award. Nakamura batted 7-for-22 (.318) with three RBIs in the series, and was credited for two caught stealings and his handling of Yakult's pitching staff.

== See also ==
- 2021 Korean Series
- 2021 World Series
- 2021 Taiwan Series
