= Hirotoshi Takanashi =

Japanese baseball player (born 1991)

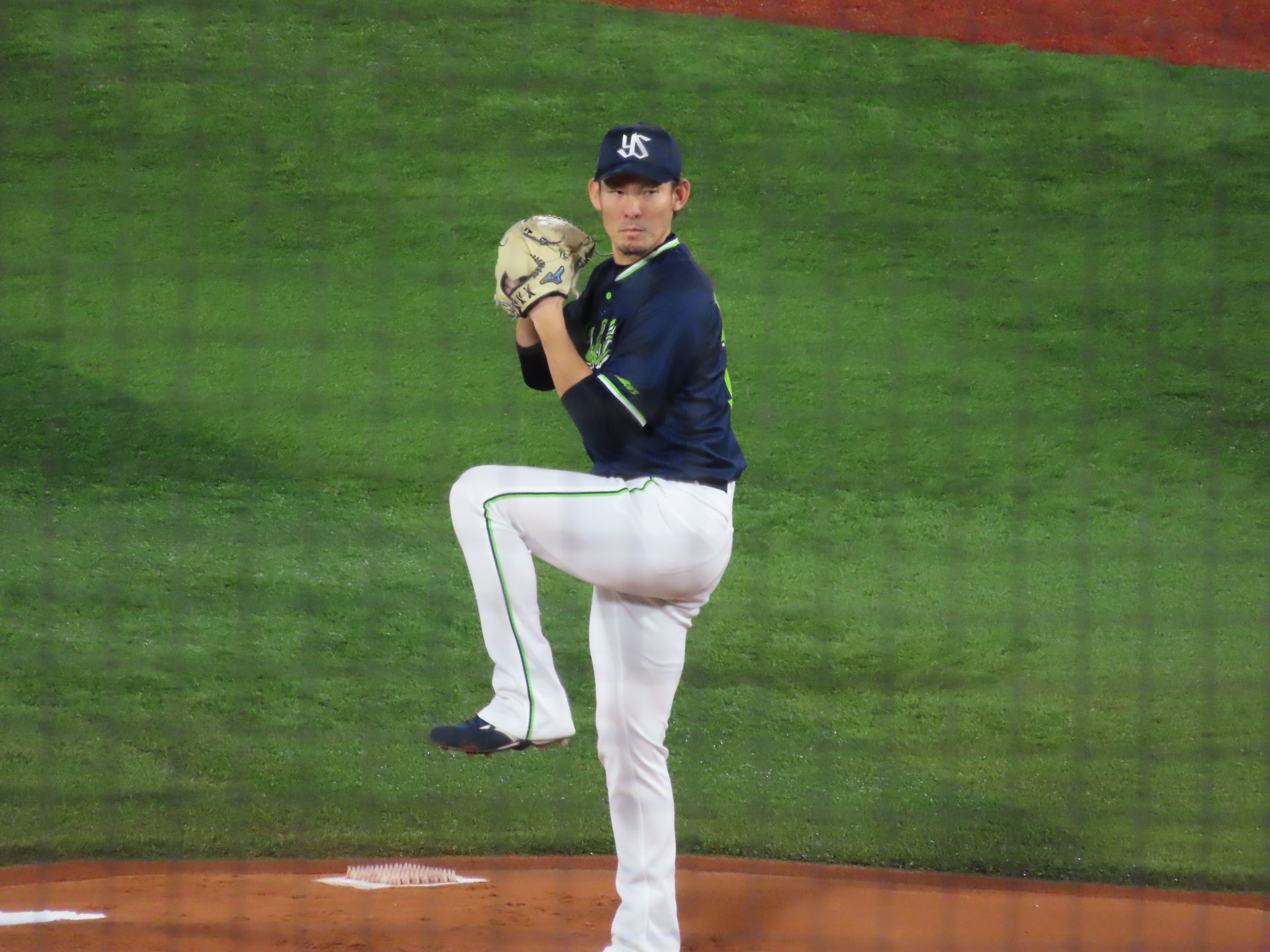
- Takanashi in 2021

Tokyo Yakult Swallows – No. 40
- Pitcher
- Born: June 5, 1991 (age 34); Mobara, Chiba, Japan
- Bats: Right Throws: Right

NPB debut
- May 3, 2015, for the Hokkaido Nippon-Ham Fighters

NPB statistics (through 2024 season)
- Win–loss: 42-47
- ERA: 4.08
- Strikeouts: 644
- Stats at Baseball Reference

Teams
- Hokkaido Nippon-Ham Fighters (2014–2018); Tokyo Yakult Swallows (2019–present)

Career highlights and awards
- 2016 Pacific League Rookie of the Year; 2× Japan Series champion (2016, 2021)

Hirotoshi Takanashi (高梨 裕稔, Takanashi Hirotoshi; born June 5, 1991) is a professional Japanese baseball player. He plays pitcher for the Tokyo Yakult Swallows.
