= Yuhei Nakamura =

Japanese baseball player (born 1990)

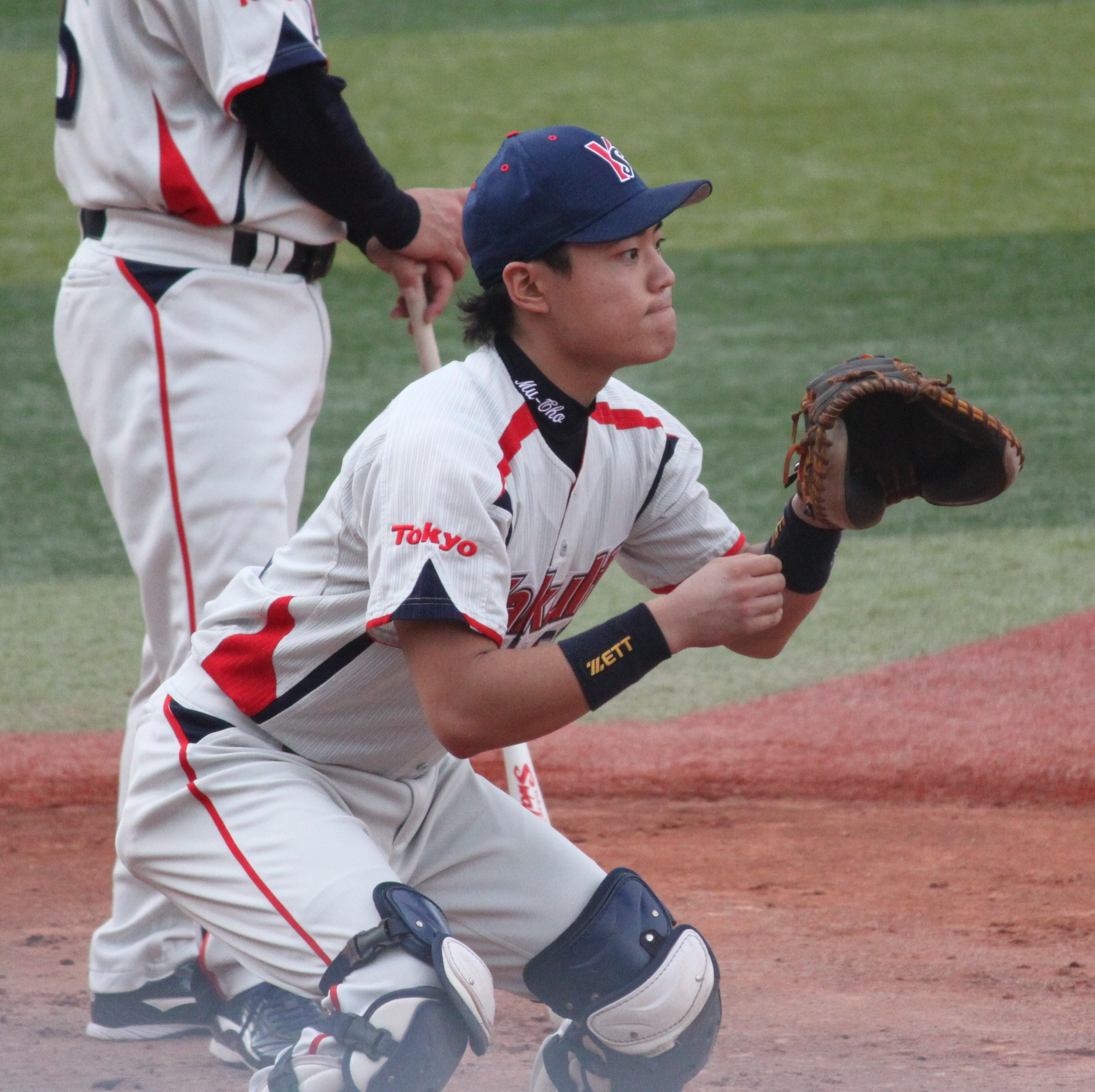
- Nakamura in 2011 at Yokohama Stadium

Tokyo Yakult Swallows – No. 27
- Catcher
- Born: 17 June 1990 (age 35); Ōno, Fukui, Japan
- Bats: Right Throws: Right

NPB debut
- 2 October, 2009, for the Tokyo Yakult Swallows

NPB statistics (through 2025 season)
- Batting average: .242
- Hits: 1,017
- Home runs: 41
- RBIs: 381
- Stolen bases: 13
- Stats at Baseball Reference

Teams
- Tokyo Yakult Swallows (2009–present)

Career highlights and awards
- 7× NPB All-Star (2014–2016, 2018, 2019, 2021, 2022); 3× Best Nine Award (2015, 2021, 2022); 3× Mitsui Golden Glove Award (2015, 2021, 2022); Japan Series champion (2021); Japan Series MVP (2021)
Medals
Men's baseball
Representing Japan
World Baseball Classic
Gold medal – first place	2023 Miami	Team
2015 WBSC Premier12
Bronze medal – third place	2015 Tokyo	Team

Yuhei Nakamura (中村 悠平, Nakamura Yūhei; born 17 June 1990) is a Japanese professional baseball player. He plays catcher for the Tokyo Yakult Swallows.

== Career ==
Nakamura was selected to the 2018 NPB All-Star game. In the 2021 Japan Series, he batted 7-for-22 (a team-best .318 average) with three RBIs and threw out a couple of base-runners to win the Japan Series Most Valuable Player Award.

== International career ==
Nakamura appeared in 5 games for Japan in the 2023 World Baseball Classic, winning gold.
