= Naomichi Nishiura =

Japanese baseball player (born 1991)

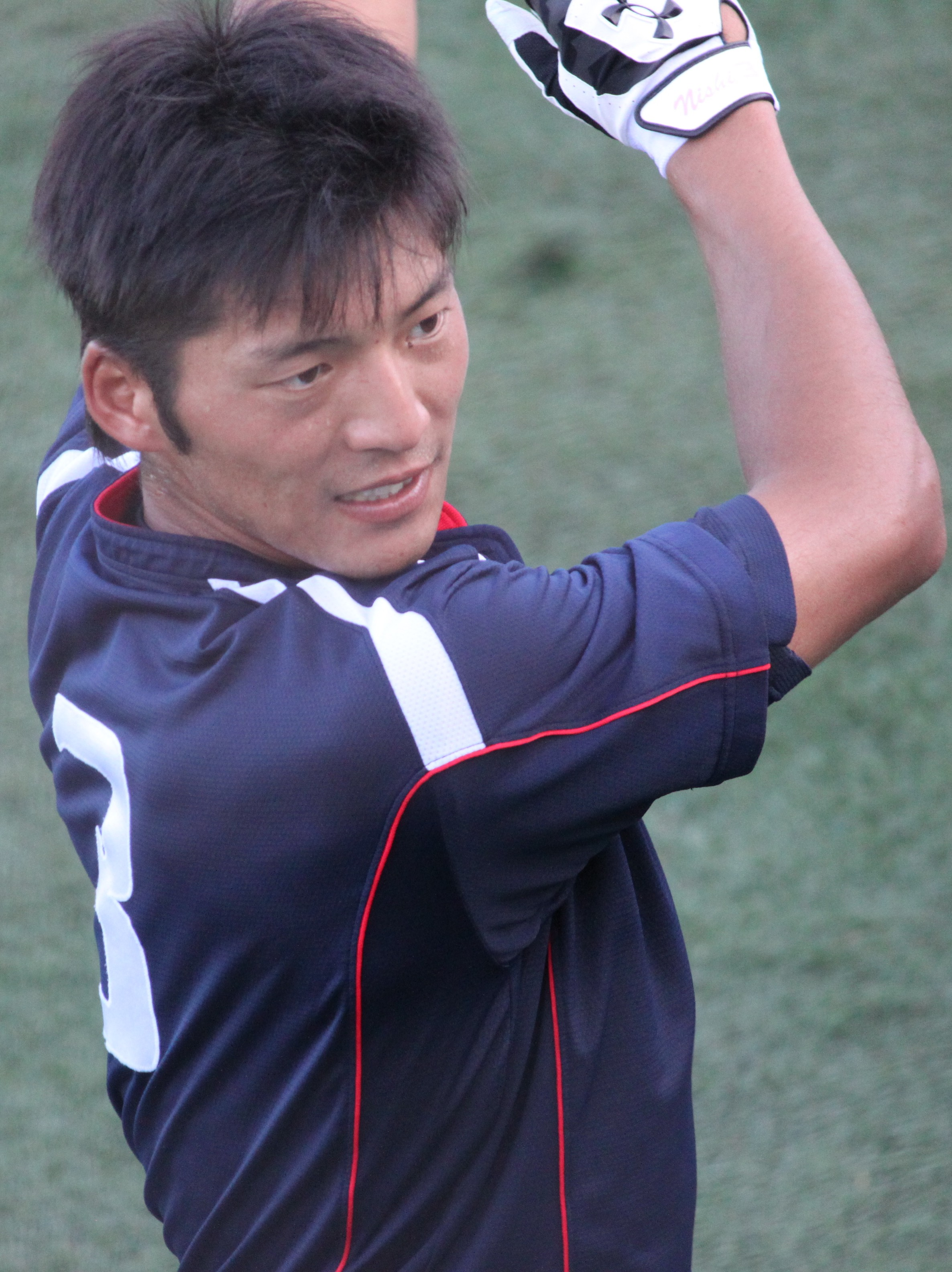
- Nisiura with the Tokyo Yakult Swallows

Tokyo Yakult Swallows – No. 85
- Infielder/Coach
- Born: April 11, 1991 (age 35); Nara, Japan
- Batted: Right Threw: Right

debut
- March 28, 2014, for the Tokyo Yakult Swallows

Last appearance
- August 24, 2024, for the Yokohama DeNA BayStars

Career statistics (through 2024 season)
- Batting average: .236
- Hits: 394
- Home runs: 38
- RBIs: 190
- Stolen bases: 19
- Stats at Baseball Reference

Teams
- As player: Tokyo Yakult Swallows (2014–2023); Yokohama DeNA BayStars (2023–2024); As coach: Tokyo Yakult Swallows (2025–)

Career highlights and awards
- 1× Japan Series champion (2021)

Naomichi Nishiura (西浦 直亨, Nishiura Naomichi; born April 11, 1991 in Nara, Japan) is a former professional Japanese baseball player.
