= Domingo Santana =

Dominican baseball player (born 1992)

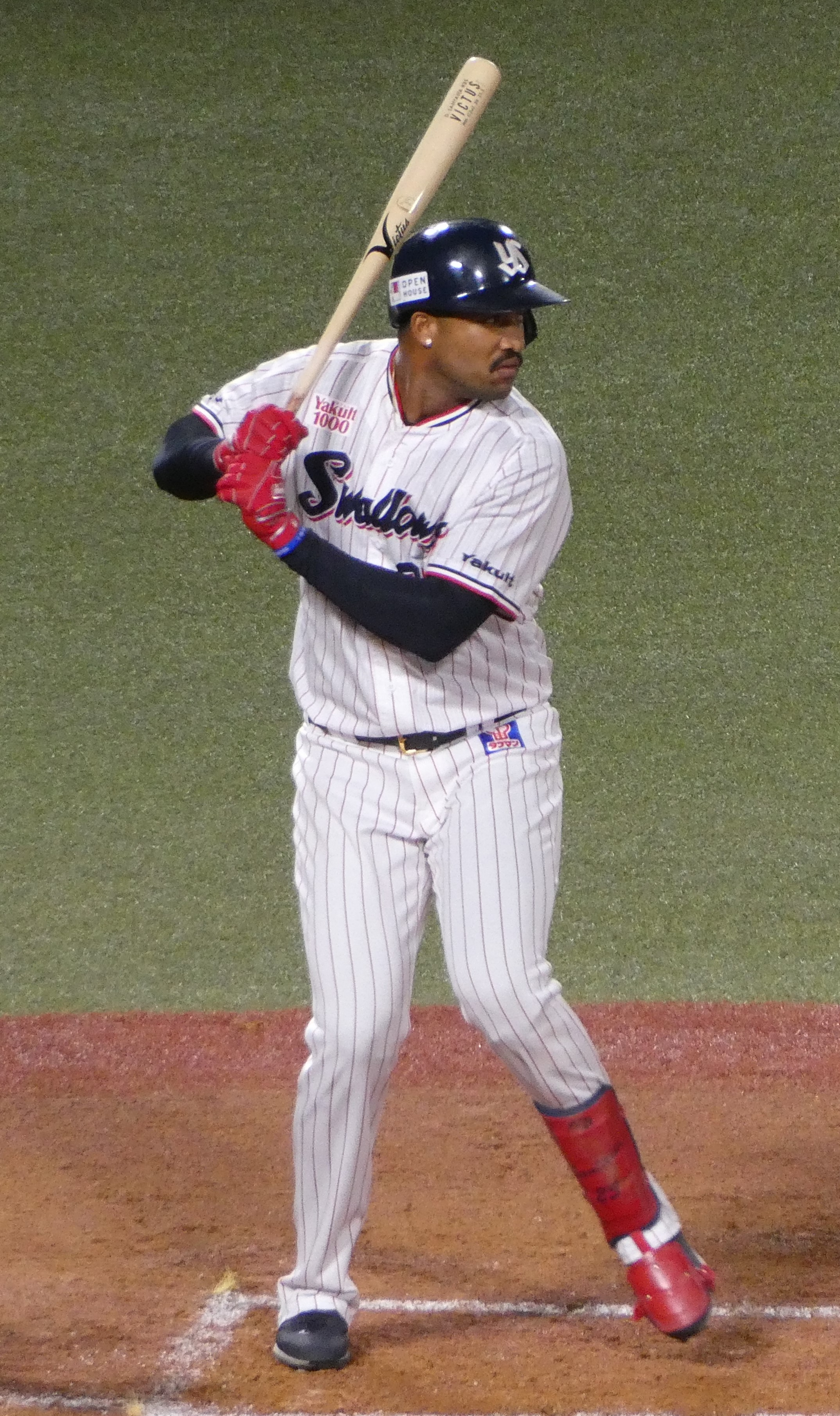
- Santana with the Tokyo Yakult Swallows

Tokyo Yakult Swallows – No. 25
- Outfielder
- Born: August 5, 1992 (age 34); Santo Domingo, Distrito Nacional, Dominican Republic
- Bats: Right Throws: Right

Professional debut
- MLB: July 1, 2014, for the Houston Astros
- NPB: April 24, 2021, for the Tokyo Yakult Swallows

MLB statistics (through 2020 season)
- Batting average: .255
- Home runs: 77
- Runs batted in: 244

NPB statistics (through August 18, 2026)
- Batting average: .287
- Home runs: 87
- Runs batted in: 283
- Stats at Baseball Reference

Teams
- Houston Astros (2014–2015); Milwaukee Brewers (2015–2018); Seattle Mariners (2019); Cleveland Indians (2020); Tokyo Yakult Swallows (2021–present)

Career highlights and awards
- NPB: 1× Japan Series champion (2021); 1× NPB All-Star (2024); 1× Central League Best Nine Award (2024)

Domingo Alberto Santana (born August 5, 1992) is a Dominican professional baseball outfielder for the Tokyo Yakult Swallows of Nippon Professional Baseball (NPB). He has previously played in Major League Baseball (MLB) for the Houston Astros, Milwaukee Brewers, Seattle Mariners, and Cleveland Indians.

== Career ==
=== Philadelphia Phillies ===
Santana signed as an international free agent with the Philadelphia Phillies in March 2009, receiving a $330,000 signing bonus. He made his professional debut with the GCL Phillies, slashing .288/.388/.508 in 37 games. The next year, he split the season between the Low-A Williamsport Crosscutters and the Single-A Lakewood BlueClaws, batting a cumulative .211/.329/.333 with 8 home runs and 36 RBI. In 2011, Santana was assigned to Lakewood to begin the year, and hit .269/.345/.434 with 7 home runs and 32 RBI in 96 games for the club.

=== Houston Astros ===
The Phillies traded Santana to the Houston Astros on July 31, 2011, with Jon Singleton, Jarred Cosart, and Josh Zeid, in exchange for Hunter Pence. He finished the year with the Single-A Lexington Legends, hitting .382/.447/.662 with 5 home runs and 21 RBI in 17 contests. In 2012, Santana played for the High-A Lancaster JetHawks, batting .302/.385/.536 with career-highs in home runs (23) and RBI (97). He spent the 2013 season with the Double-A Corpus Christi Hooks, posting a .252/.345/.498 slash line with a career-high 25 home runs and 64 RBI. He was added to the 40-man roster on November 20, 2013. He was assigned to Triple-A to begin the 2014 season.

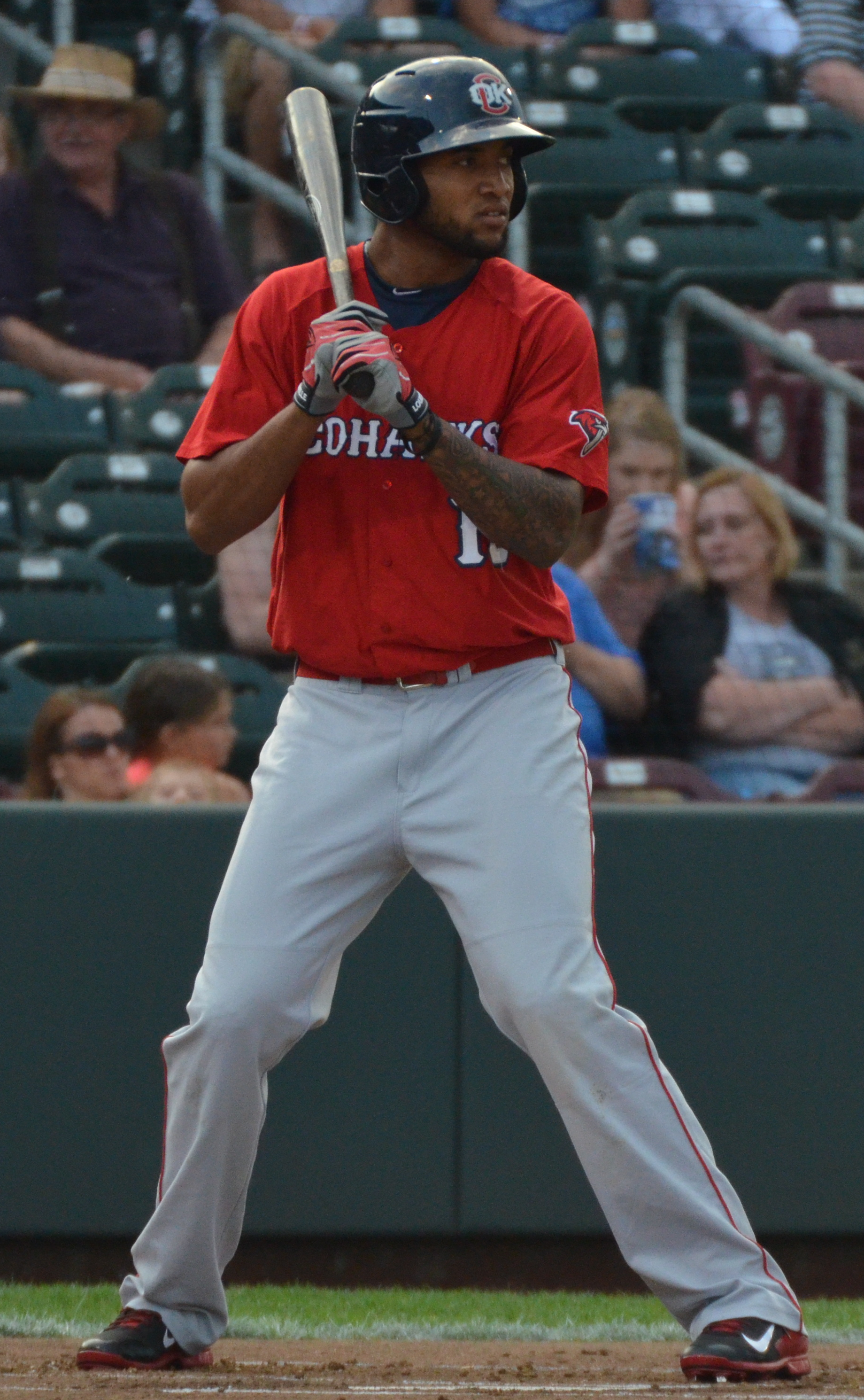
Santana batting for the Oklahoma City RedHawks in 2014

The Astros promoted Santana to the major leagues from the Oklahoma City RedHawks of the Triple-A Pacific Coast League (PCL) on July 1, 2014. He debuted the same day, going 0-for-4 with three strikeouts. After batting 0-for-13 with 11 strikeouts, the Astros demoted Santana to Oklahoma City on July 6.

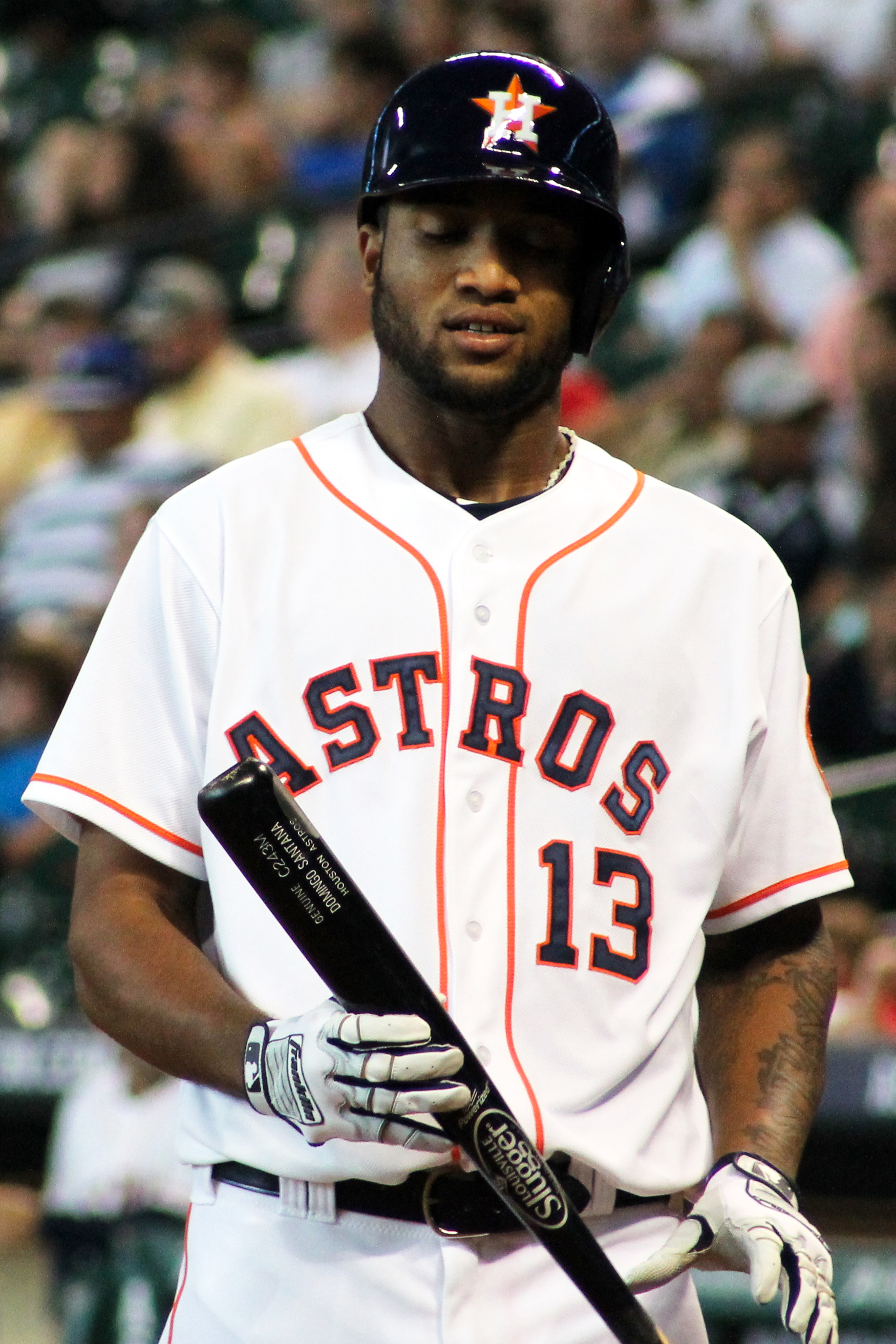
Santana with the Houston Astros in 2014

On March 13, 2015, Santana was optioned to the Fresno Grizzlies of the PCL. He was recalled on June 16. That same day, he collected his first major league hit on an RBI single to right that scored Evan Gattis.

=== Milwaukee Brewers ===
On July 30, 2015, the Astros traded Santana, Brett Phillips, Josh Hader, and Adrian Houser to the Milwaukee Brewers for Carlos Gómez and Mike Fiers. The Brewers assigned Santana to the Colorado Springs Sky Sox of the PCL, and promoted him to the major leagues on August 21. He missed most of the 2016 season with a shoulder and an elbow injury.

In spring training of 2017, Santana competed for the starting right field job, ultimately winning the job. On July 26, 2017, Santana hit a 475-foot (145 m) home run, the longest home run at Nationals Park until 2020, which landed on the concourse behind the left field stands. Santana continued as the starting right fielder for the remainder of the season, finishing with a career-high 30 home runs and 85 RBIs in 151 games.

Before the 2018 season, the Brewers acquired Christian Yelich and Lorenzo Cain, leaving Santana to serve as a bench player for the beginning of the season. Through 189 at bats, he was hitting .249 with three home runs and 17 RBIs off the bench before being demoted to Colorado Springs on June 23. He batted .283 with eight home runs in 55 games for the Sky Sox. The Brewers recalled Santana on September 1. As a pinch hitter, Santana batted 9-for-22 (.409) in the final month of the season.

=== Seattle Mariners ===
On December 21, 2018, the Brewers traded Santana to the Seattle Mariners for Ben Gamel and Noah Zavolas. In the Mariners season opener in Japan on March 20, Santana hit a grand slam to help the Mariners to the win over the Athletics.

In 2019, he batted .253/.329/.441. He had the highest strikeout percentage in the major leagues (32.3%). He led all major league outfielders with 12 errors and was one of the worst fielders at any position, according to Statcast. On December 2, 2019, Santana was non-tendered by Seattle and became a free agent.

=== Cleveland Indians ===
On February 14, 2020, Santana was signed to a one-year contract with the Cleveland Indians, with a club option for the 2021 season. Santana was designated for assignment by the Indians on August 31, after he struggled to a .157/.298/.286 slash line with two home runs and 12 RBI in 24 games. After clearing waivers, Santana was outrighted to the Indians' alternate training site on September 4. The Indians declined their club option on Santana's contract for the 2021 season on October 30, making Santana a free agent.

=== Tokyo Yakult Swallows ===
On December 2, 2020, Santana signed with the Tokyo Yakult Swallows of Nippon Professional Baseball. He hit two home runs in the 2021 Japan Series, helping the Swallows win the championship.

On November 28, 2023, Santana re-signed a one-year contract with the Swallows worth $2.45 million. He signed a three-year contract extension in June 2024. He was an NPB All-Star in 2024 and led the Central League in on-base percentage.

== Personal life ==
Santana's father played in the Houston Astros organization. Santana learned to speak English on Saint Thomas of the U.S. Virgin Islands, where his father is from. Santana's older brother Yoangel was shot and killed in 2009.

Santana has a child.
