= Juri Hara =

Japanese baseball player (born 1993)

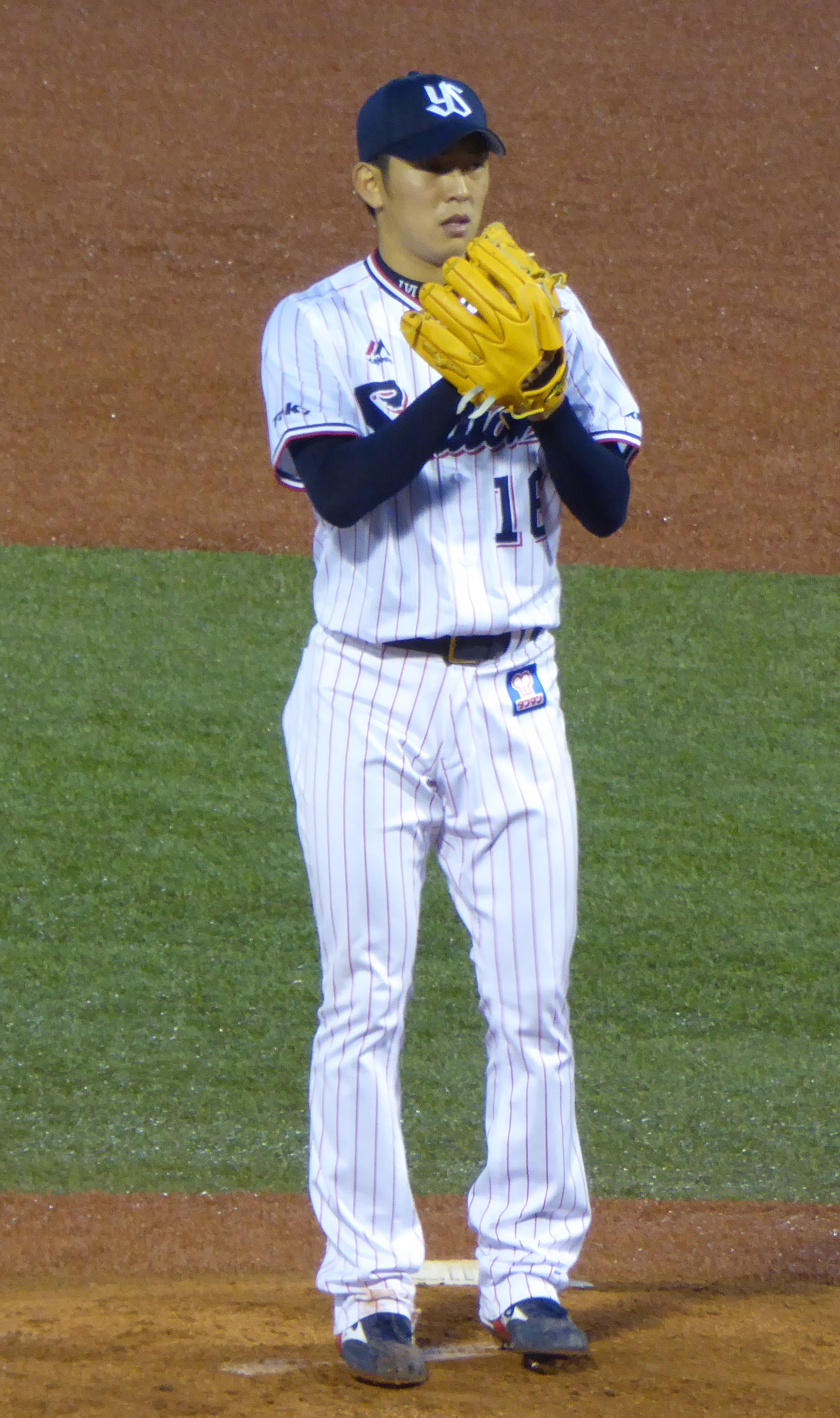
- Hara with the Tokyo Yakult Swallows

Free agent
- Pitcher
- Born: July 19, 1993 (age 32); Kakogawa, Hyōgo, Japan
- Bats: Right Throws: Right

NPB debut
- March 27, 2016, for the Tokyo Yakult Swallows

NPB statistics (through 2025 season)
- Win–loss: 27–43
- ERA: 4.14
- Strikeouts: 391
- Stats at Baseball Reference

Teams
- Tokyo Yakult Swallows (2016–2025)

Career highlights and awards
- Japan Series champion (2021)

Juri Hara (原 樹理, Hara Juri; born July 19, 1993) is a Japanese professional baseball pitcher who is a free agent. He has previously played in Nippon Professional Baseball (NPB) for the Tokyo Yakult Swallows.

== Career ==
Hara was the first pick for the Swallows at the 2015 Nippon Professional Baseball draft.

On February 27, 2019, he was selected for Japan national baseball team at the 2019 exhibition games against Mexico.

Hara did not appear for the team during the 2025 season. On September 29, 2025, the Swallows announced that they would be releasing Hara.
