= Keiji Takahashi =

Japanese baseball player (born 1997)

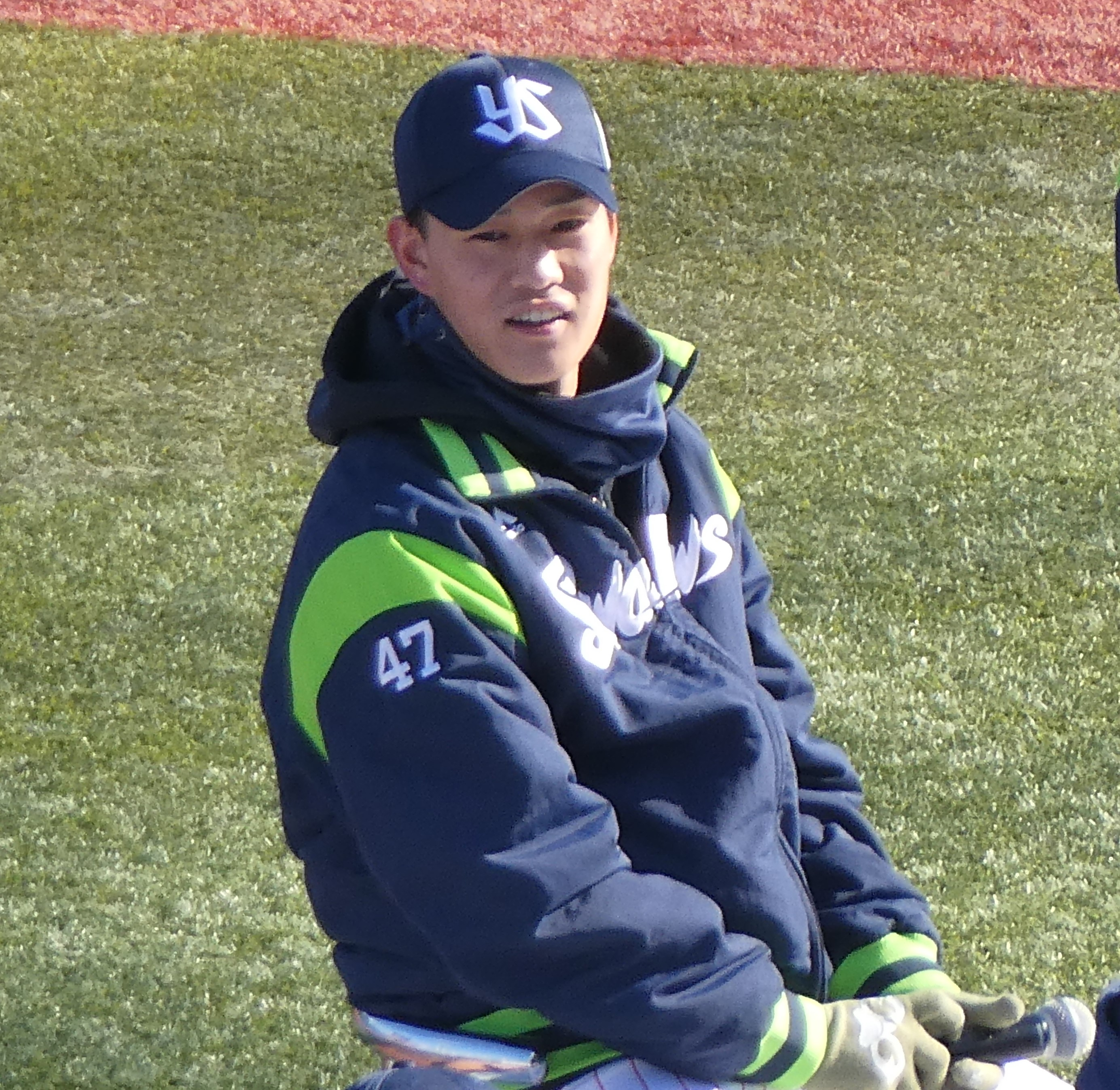
- Takahashi with the Tokyo Yakult Swallows

Tokyo Yakult Swallows – No. 47
- Pitcher
- Born: May 14, 1997 (age 28); Kameoka, Kyoto, Japan
- Bats: Left Throws: Left

NPB debut
- September 5, 2018, for the Tokyo Yakult Swallows

Career statistics (through 2024 season)
- Win–loss record: 30–31
- Earned Run Average: 3.88
- Strikeouts: 563

Teams
- Tokyo Yakult Swallows (2016–present)

Career highlights and awards
- 1× Japan Series champion (2021); 1× NPB All-Star (2022)
Medals
Men's baseball
Representing Japan
World Baseball Classic
Gold medal – first place	2023 Miami	Team

Keiji Takahashi (高橋 奎二, Takahashi Keiji; born May 14, 1997) is a professional Japanese baseball player. He plays pitcher for the Tokyo Yakult Swallows. He is married to former AKB48 member Tomomi Itano.
