= Ryo Yoshida =

Japanese baseball player

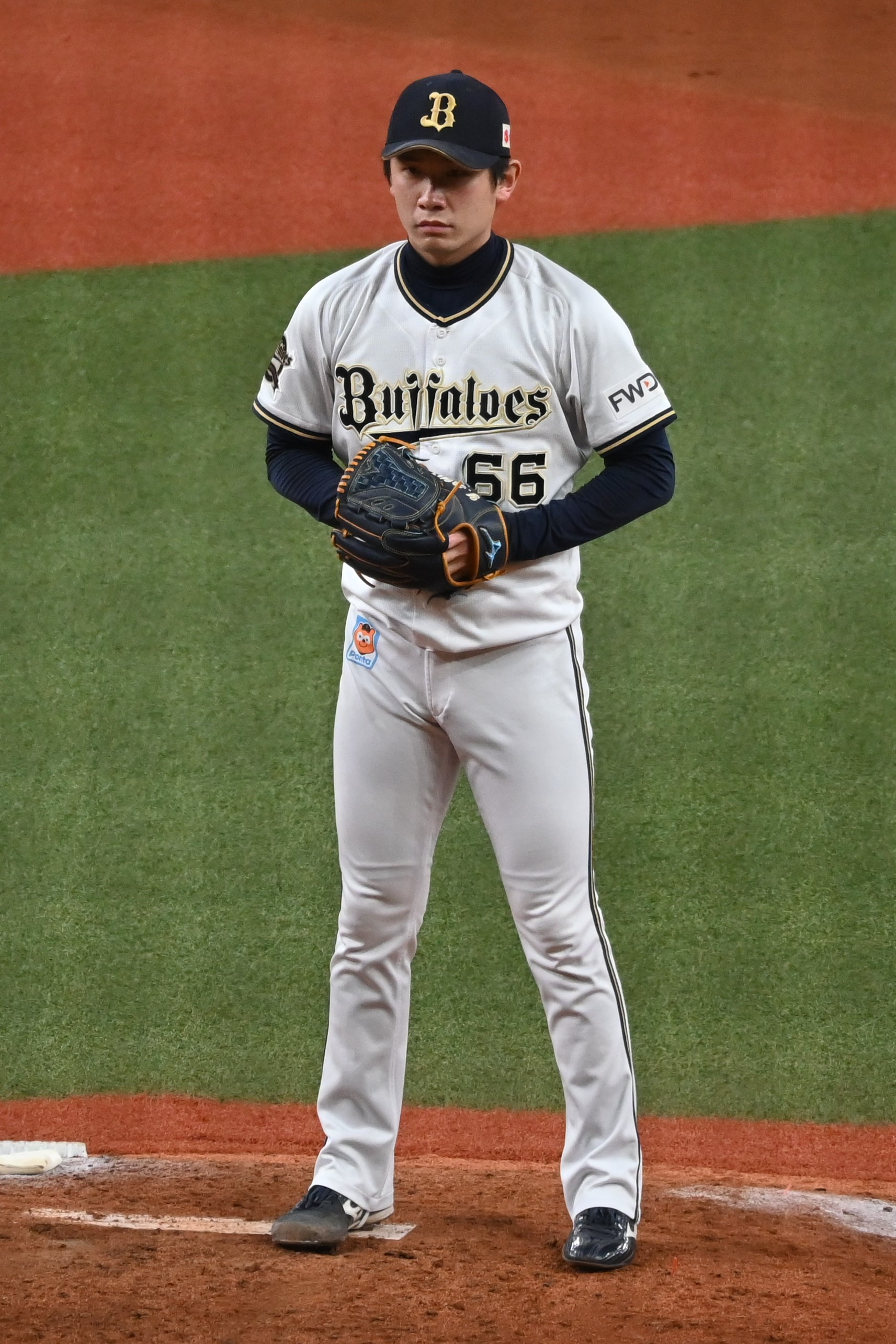
- Pitcher
- Born: June 20, 1997 (age 28); Nishiwaki, Hyōgo, Japan
- Batted: Right Threw: Right

NPB debut
- October 3, 2017, for the Orix Buffaloes

Last NPB appearance
- September 23, 2024, for the Chiba Lotte Marines

Career statistics
- Win–loss record: 4-5
- Earned Run Average: 4.04
- Strikeouts: 78
- Saves: 0
- Holds: 17
- Stats at Baseball Reference

Teams
- Orix Buffaloes (2016–2023); Chiba Lotte Marines (2024)

Ryo Yoshida (吉田 凌, Yoshida Ryo; born June 20, 1997 in Nishiwaki, Hyōgo, Japan) is a professional Japanese baseball player. He plays pitcher for the Chiba Lotte Marines.
