= Motoki Higa =

Japanese baseball player (born 1982)

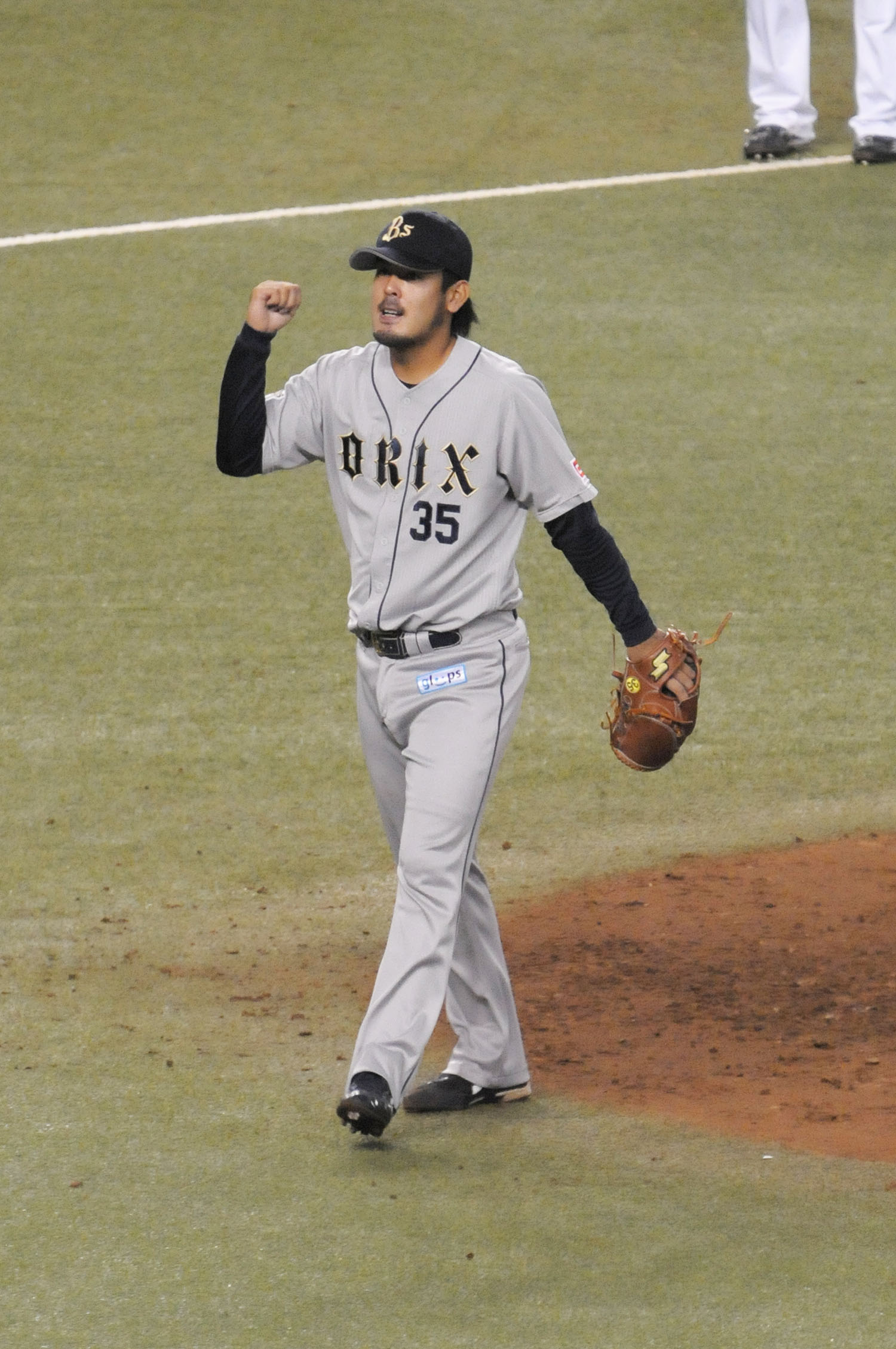
- Higa with the Orix Buffaloes

Orix Buffaloes – No. 77
- Pitcher / Coach
- Born: December 7, 1982 (age 43); Okinawa, Okinawa, Japan
- Batted: Right Threw: Right

NPB debut
- August 13, 2010, for the Orix Buffaloes

Last NPB appearance
- Septrember 16, 2024, for the Orix Buffaloes

NPB statistics
- Win–loss record: 26-11
- ERA: 2.65
- Strikeouts: 288
- Saves: 3
- Holds: 93
- Stats at Baseball Reference

Teams
- As player: Orix Buffaloes (2010–2024); As coach: Orix Buffaloes (2025–present)

Career highlights and awards
- Japan Series champion (2022)

Motoki Higa (比嘉 幹貴, Higa Motoki; born December 7, 1982) is a Japanese professional baseball pitcher for the Orix Buffaloes of Nippon Professional Baseball (NPB).

== Career ==
On September 15, 2024, Higa announced that he would be retiring following the conclusion of the season.
