= Noboru Shimizu =

Japanese baseball player (born 1996)

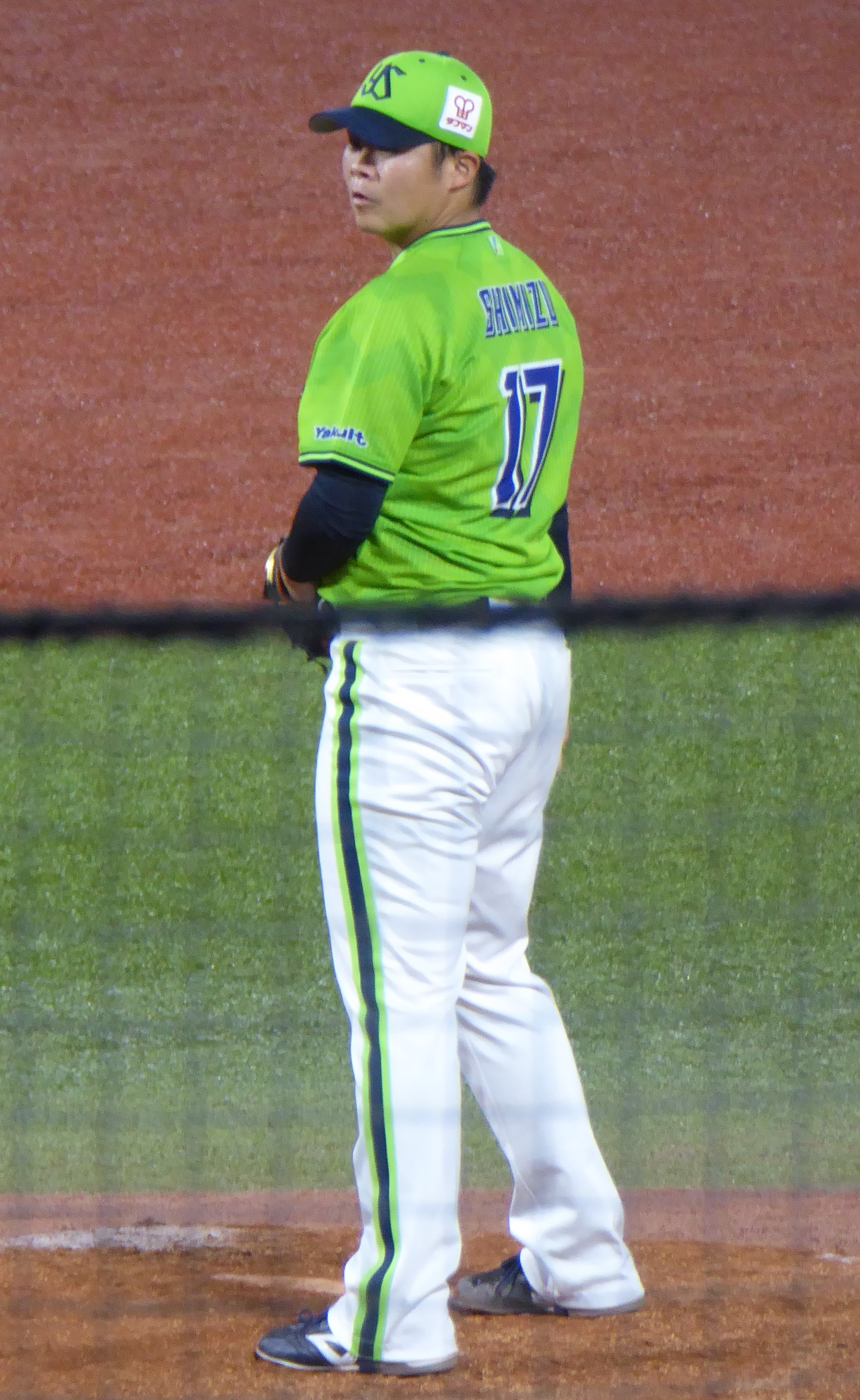
- Shimizu with the Tokyo Yakult Swallows

Tokyo Yakult Swallows – No. 17
- Pitcher
- Born: October 25, 1996 (age 29); Adachi, Tokyo, Japan
- Bats: Left Throws: Right

NPB debut
- June 1, 2019, for the Tokyo Yakult Swallows

Career statistics (through 2024 season)
- Win–loss record: 9-28
- Earned Run Average: 3.32
- Strikeouts: 254
- Saves: 3
- Holds: 148
- Stats at Baseball Reference

Teams
- Tokyo Yakult Swallows (2019–present)

Career highlights and awards
- 2× Central League Most Valuable Setup pitcher (2020, 2021); 2× NPB All-Star (2021, 2023); 1× Japan Series champion (2021)

Noboru Shimizu (清水 昇, Shimizu Noboru; born October 25, 1996 in Adachi, Tokyo, Japan) is a professional Japanese baseball player. He plays pitcher for the Tokyo Yakult Swallows.
