= Scott McGough =

American baseball player (born 1989)

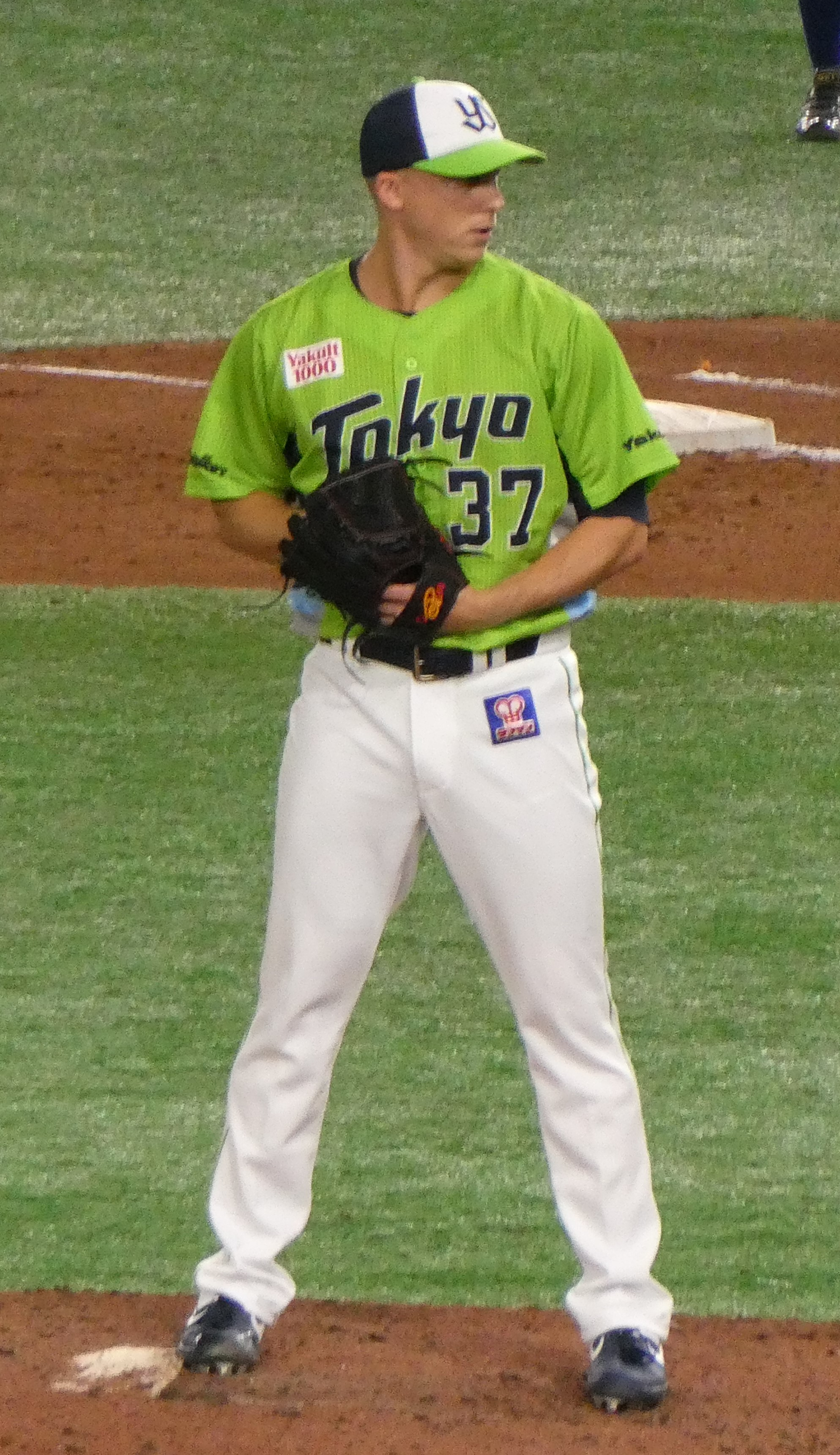
- McGough with the Tokyo Yakult Swallows in 2021

Free agent
- Pitcher
- Born: October 31, 1989 (age 36); Pittsburgh, Pennsylvania, U.S.
- Bats: Right Throws: Right

Professional debut
- MLB: August 20, 2015, for the Miami Marlins
- NPB: March 30, 2019, for the Tokyo Yakult Swallows

MLB statistics (through 2025 season)
- Win–loss record: 3–10
- Earned run average: 5.94
- Strikeouts: 131

NPB statistics (through 2022 season)
- Win–loss record: 15–8
- Earned run average: 2.94
- Strikeouts: 251
- Saves: 80
- Stats at Baseball Reference

Teams
- Miami Marlins (2015); Tokyo Yakult Swallows (2019–2022); Arizona Diamondbacks (2023–2025); Athletics (2025)

Career highlights and awards
- Japan Series champion (2021); 3× NPB All-Star (2019, 2021, 2022)
Medals
Men's baseball
Representing United States
Olympic Games
Silver medal – second place	2020 Tokyo	Team

Scott Thomas McGough (born October 31, 1989) is an American professional baseball pitcher who is a free agent. He has previously played in Major League Baseball (MLB) for the Miami Marlins, Arizona Diamondbacks, and Athletics and in Nippon Professional Baseball (NPB) for the Tokyo Yakult Swallows.

== Professional career ==
=== Los Angeles Dodgers ===
McGough attended Plum High School in Plum, Pennsylvania, where he played baseball and basketball and was drafted by the Pittsburgh Pirates in the 46th round of the 2008 Major League Baseball draft, but did not sign. Instead, he chose to attend the University of Oregon, where he played for the baseball team. In the 2011 Major League Baseball draft, he was drafted in the fifth round by the Los Angeles Dodgers.

McGough began his professional career in 2011 with the Rookie–level Ogden Raptors, and later earned a call-up to the Single-A Great Lakes Loons, pitching to a cumulative 2.77 ERA on the year. In 2012, he began the season with the High-A Rancho Cucamonga Quakes.

=== Miami Marlins ===
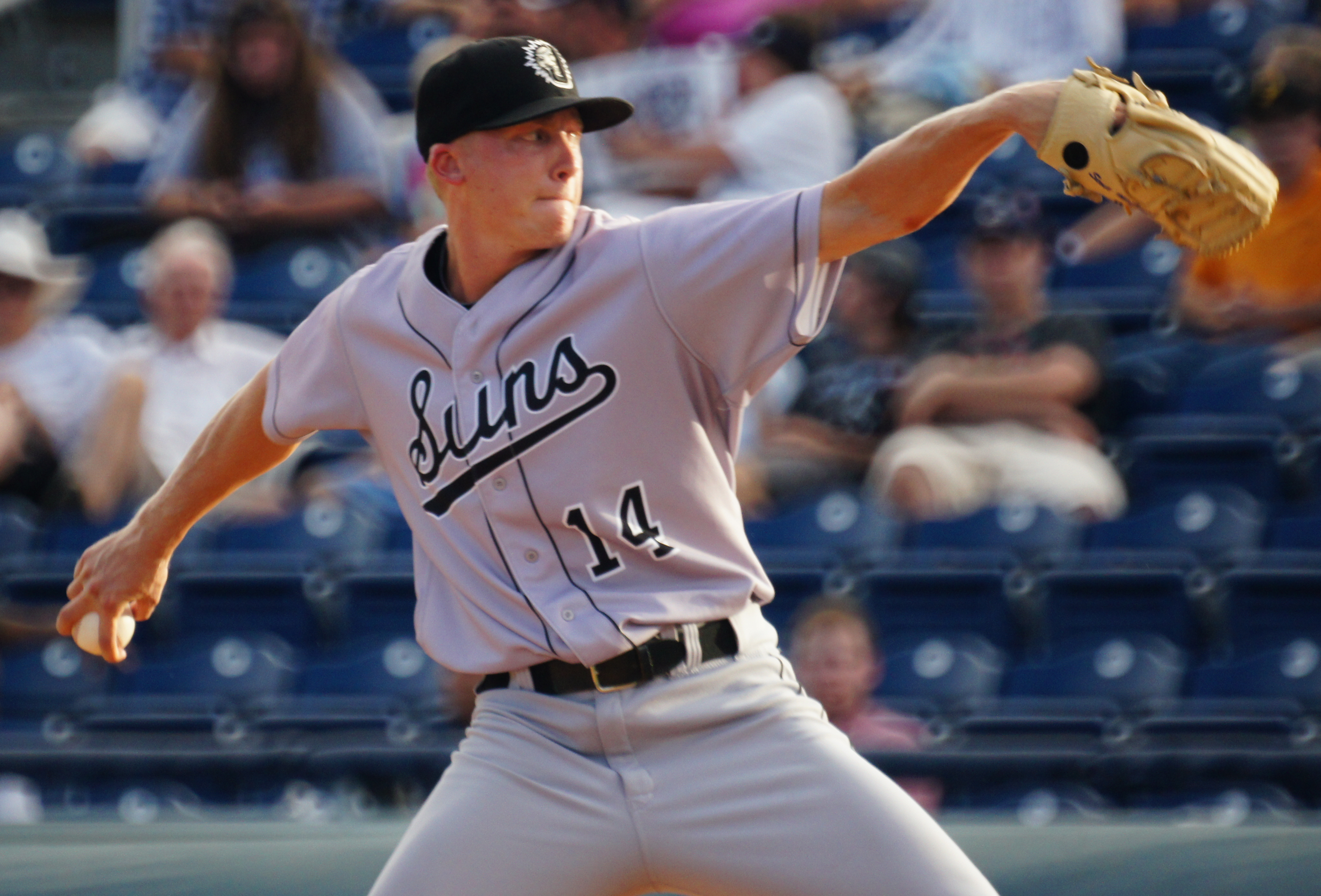
McGough with the Jacksonville Suns in 2013

On July 25, 2012, McGough and Nathan Eovaldi were traded to the Miami Marlins in exchange for Hanley Ramírez and Randy Choate. He finished the year with the High-A Jupiter Hammerheads, recording a 2–1 record and 3.24 ERA in 15 appearances. In 2013, McGough split the season between the Double-A Jacksonville Suns and the Triple-A New Orleans Zephyrs, posting a 4–4 record and 2.82 ERA with 59 strikeouts in 67.0 innings of work. In 2014, McGough underwent Tommy John surgery, and missed the 2014 season as a result. In 2015, McGough returned to action with Jupiter, Jacksonville, and New Orleans, accumulating a 1.93 ERA in 27 games for the three teams.

On August 20, 2015, McGough was selected to the 40-man roster and promoted to the major leagues for the first time. In his debut, McGough struggled, allowing three runs while only getting two outs against the Philadelphia Phillies. In his rookie season, he logged a 9.45 ERA across 6 appearances. On April 14, 2016, McGough was designated for assignment by Miami after struggling to a 13.50 ERA in 2 games with Triple-A New Orleans.

=== Baltimore Orioles ===
McGough was claimed off waivers by the Baltimore Orioles on April 15, 2016. On May 7, McGough was designated for assignment by the Orioles. He spent the season split between the Triple-A Norfolk Tides and the Double-A Bowie Baysox, posting a 2–3 record and 4.72 ERA in Norfolk and a 2–2 record and 5.68 ERA in Bowie. McGough split the 2017 season between Norfolk and Bowie as well, accumulating a 3–4 record and 2.75 ERA in 40 appearances between the two teams. He elected free agency following the season on November 6.

=== Colorado Rockies ===
On November 23, 2017, McGough signed a minor league contract with the Colorado Rockies organization. He was assigned to the Triple–A Albuquerque Isotopes for the 2018 season, where he pitched to a 7–3 record and 5.55 ERA in 43 games. He elected free agency following the season on November 2, and re-signed with the team on a new minor league contract on November 9. McGough was later released on December 18, 2018.

=== Tokyo Yakult Swallows ===
On December 25, 2018, McGough signed with the Tokyo Yakult Swallows of Nippon Professional Baseball. In 2019, McGough pitched to a 6–3 record and 3.15 ERA with 11 saves in 65 games with the team. The next year, McGough pitched in 50 games for Tokyo, recording a 4–1 record and 3.91 ERA with 52 strikeouts in 46 innings pitched.

=== Arizona Diamondbacks ===
On December 15, 2022, McGough signed a two-year contract with the Arizona Diamondbacks. He earned his first career MLB save on April 2, 2023, against the Los Angeles Dodgers. In 63 appearances for the Diamondbacks, McGough registered a 2-7 record and 4.73 ERA with 86 strikeouts and 9 saves across 70 1/3 innings pitched.

While playing against the New York Yankees on April 3, 2024, McGough was called in to bat with the bases loaded and two outs. He ended up striking out looking as the Diamondbacks lost 5-6 in 11 innings. He pitched in 26 games for Arizona during the 2024 campaign, struggling to a 1-3 record and 7.44 ERA with 25 strikeouts across 32 2/3 innings pitched.

On February 11, 2025, McGough re-signed with the Diamondbacks on a minor league contract. He was assigned to the Triple-A Reno Aces to begin the season. On April 27, the Diamondbacks selected McGough's contract, adding him to their active roster. In seven appearances for Arizona, he struggled to a 6.43 ERA with five strikeouts across seven innings pitched. On June 5, McGough was designated for assignment by the Diamondbacks. He elected free agency after clearing waivers on June 10.

=== Athletics ===
On June 14, 2025, McGough signed a minor league contract with the Athletics. In 16 appearances for the Triple-A Las Vegas Aviators, he posted a 4-0 record and 3.38 ERA with 19 strikeouts and one save across 24 innings of work. On September 1, the Athletics selected McGough's contract, adding him to their active roster. He became a free agent following the season.

== International career ==
On July 2, 2021, McGough was named to the roster for the United States national baseball team for the 2020 Summer Olympics, contested in 2021 in Tokyo. The team went on to win silver, falling to Japan in the gold-medal game.
