= List of current Nippon Professional Baseball team rosters =

Below are the full rosters, including the coaching staffs, of all current Nippon Professional Baseball teams.

== Central League ==
Chunichi Dragons roster
First team		Second team
Pitchers: 17 Yūya Yanagi; 19 Hiroto Takahashi; 20 Hideaki Wakui; 21 Yumeto Kanemaru; 22 Yūdai Ōno; 26 Reia Nakachi; 30 Akira Neo; 47 Seiya Yoshida; 54 Kento Fujishima; 59 Kōki Saitō; 68 Kenshin Makino; 70 Ren Kondo; 90 Shinya Matsuyama; 91 Humberto Mejía; Catchers: 35 Takuya Kinoshita; 49 Takuma Katō	Infielders: 0 Rintarō Tsujimoto; 2 Mikiya Tanaka; 3 Shūhei Takahashi; 5 Kaito Muramatsu; 7 Hiroki Fukunaga; 23 Miguel Sanó; 48 Toshiki Abe; 63 Yutaro Itayama; 65 Naoto Chino; Outfielders: 8 Yōhei Ōshima; 24 Jason Vosler; 55 Seiya Hosokawa; 57 Asahi Hanada; Manager: 99 Kazuki Inoue; Coaches: 83 Daisuke Yamai (pitching); 82 Takuya Asao (pitching); 72 Shōta Ōno (battery); 74 Yuji Iiyama (position player coordinator); 89 Nobuhiko Matsunaka (hitting coordinator); 78 Masahiko Morino (hitting/strategy); 71 Naomichi Donoue (infield defense); 87 Yutaka Nakamura (outfield defense); 76 Akinori Ōtsuka (roving pitching/development)	Pitchers: 11 Masaki Nakanishi; 13 Yūki Hashimoto; 14 Shō Kusaka; 16 Yoshinori Sakurai; 28 Albert Abreu; 29 Yūta Matsukihira; 32 Mao Itoh; 33 Toshihiro Sugiura; 34 Hiroto Fuku; 36 Kōnosuke Fukuda; 38 Takahiro Matsuba; 41 Akiyoshi Katsuno; 46 Yūgo Umeno; 50 Tatsuya Shimizu; 52 Kunitada Shinozaki; 61 Kōsuke Takahashi; 64 Keito Arima; 69 Mizuki Miura; 93 Kyle Muller; Catchers: 9 Yuta Ishii; 39 Shingo Usami; 43 Taisei Miya; 58 Kōta Ishibashi	Infielders: 4 Orlando Calixte; 25 Takaya Ishikawa; 31 Shunta Mori; 45 Ryūku Tsuchida; 60 Yasuhiro Yamamoto; 56 Mao Shimpo; 95 Christián Rodríguez; 97 Seishū Higuchi; Outfielders: 00 Gōki Oda; 1 Yūki Okabayashi; 42 Kenta Bright; 44 Seiji Kawagoe; 51 Seiji Uebayashi; 66 Kōsuke Ukai; 67 Kiramu Noto; Manager: 88 Eiji Ochiai; Coaches: 77 Shinichirō Koyama (pitching coordinator); 98 Shinji Tajima (pitching); 84 Nobumasa Fukuda (hitting); 78 Masaaki Koike (hitting coordinator); 80 Kōhei Oda (battery); 81 Yūto Morikoshi (infield defense); 88 Ryōsuke Hirata (outfield defense); 85 Hiroyuki Watanabe (position player development); 86 Masato Kobayashi (pitching/development)
Development Players
202 Naiki Nakamura (IF); 203 Kenya Inoue (P); 204 Hiroto Mori (P); 205 Shōta Habu (P); 206 Ryūnosuke Yamaasa (C); 207 Keishi Tsuda (IF); 209 Yūma Fukumoto (OF); 211 Kōdai Umetsu (P); 213 Akio Moriyama (P); 215 Tōki Hiwatari (C); 216 Taiga Ishikawa (IF); 217 Aisuke Mikami (OF); 218 Rii Kawakami (IF); 219 Randy Martínez (P)
Updated April 13, 2026		→ All NPB rosters

Hanshin Tigers roster
First team		Second team
Pitchers: 13 Suguru Iwazaki; 14 Yuta Iwasada; 18 Takato Ihara; 27 Masashi Itoh; 29 Haruto Takahashi; 35 Hiroto Saiki; 37 Masaki Oyokawa; 41 Shoki Murakami; 42 Easton Lucas; 47 Takuma Kirishiki; 54 Rito Kinoshita; 65 Atsuki Yuasa; 69 Daichi Ishii; 98 Rafael Dolis; Catchers: 2 Ryutaro Umeno; 12 Seishiro Sakamoto; 39 Yuki Sakaeda; 68 Hayato Nakagawa	Infielders: 0 Seiya Kinami; 3 Yusuke Ohyama; 4 Takahiro Kumagai; 7 Takumu Nakano; 8 Teruaki Satō; 9 Masahiro Tateishi; 24 Cam Devanney; 38 Ryūhei Obata; 62 Kai Ueda; 67 Nozomu Takatera; Outfielders: 1 Shota Morishita; 5 Kōji Chikamoto; 53 Kairi Shimada; 61 Hiroshi Toyoda; Manager: 22 Kyuji Fujikawa; Coaches Head coach: 74 Atsushi Fujimoto; Pitching chief: 88 Yuya Andoh; Pitching: 73 Satoru Kanemura; Battery: 87 Katsunori Nomura; Hitting: 71 Hiroki Uemoto; 83 Eiichi Koyano; Infield defense/Base running: 70 Shuta Tanaka; Outfield defense/Base running/Analytical: 96 So Tsutsui; First squad/Second quad batting coordinator: 86 Yutaka Wada	Pitchers: 16 Yuki Nishi; 19 Kaito Shimomura; 20 Jon Duplantier; 21 Kotaro Otake; 26 Tsuyoshi Shiiba; 28 Yuki Kesamaru; 30 Keito Mombetsu; 36 Seishu Hatake; 44 Saku Hayase; 46 Carson Ragsdale; 48 Hidetoshi Ibaragi; 49 Taisei Kudo; 50 Ren Tomida; 51 Daiki Hayakawa; 55 Shuto Noto; 63 Yuya Ishiguro; 64 Hidetaka Okadome; 66 Junya Tsuda; 92 Riku Kawahara; 99 Dauri Moreta; Catchers: 17 Torai Fushimi; 43 Hayato Machida; 57 Kenya Nagasaka; 59 Kento Fujita; 85 Rinshiro Shimamura	Infielders: 00 Hiyu Motoyama; 25 Shogo Tanihata; 33 Kento Itohara; 45 Taiyo Sano; 52 Shuya Yamada; 56 Aoi Momosaki; 94 Fumihito Haraguchi; Outfielders: 32 Taiki Hamada; 34 Kaisei Okashiro; 40 Hinase Itsubo; 58 Ukyo Maegawa; 60 Dan Onodera; 97 Kyosuke Noguchi; Manager: 78 Katsuo Hirata; Coaches Pitching chief: 90 Tomoyuki Kubota; Pitching: 72 Hirotaka Egusa; 89 Ryo Watanabe; Battery: 84 Takeshi Hidaka; Hitting/Analytical: 91 Hirotoshi Kitagawa; Hitting: 77 Eishin Soyogi; Defense/Base running: 81 Toshifumi Baba; Infield defense/Base running: 75 Noriharu Yamazaki; Outfield defense/Base running: 76 Takahito Kudo; Batter: 79 Shunsuke
Development Players
120 Junya Nishi (OF); 121 Reiji Toi (IF); 122 Ippei Ogawa (P); 123 Kai Matsubara (P); 125 Ryo Itoh (P); 126 Kein Fukushima (OF); 127 Ryōsuke Jingu (P); 129 Shōei Yamasaki (OF); 130 Toshiaki Kawasaki (IF); 132 Anthony Martinez (P); 133 Jean Arnaez (IF); 134 Stanley Consuegra (OF)
Updated January 15, 2026		→ All NPB rosters

Hiroshima Toyo Carp roster
First team		Second team
Pitchers: 13 Daisuke Moriura; 14 Daichi Ohsera; 16 Shohei Mori; 18 Masato Morishita; 19 Hiroki Tokoda; 20 Ryoji Kuribayashi; 21 Shota Nakazaki; 36 Atsuya Horie; 41 Kenya Suzuki; 42 Freddy Tarnok; 43 Sotaro Shimauchi; 53 Shun Okamoto; 65 Shogo Tamamura; 68 Taylor Hearn; 98 Taiga Tsuji; Catchers: 27 Tsubasa Aizawa; 31 Shogo Sakakura; 32 Tomoki Ishihara	Infielders: 00 Ryutaro Hatsuki; 0 Naru Katsuda; 4 Masaya Yano; 5 Kaito Kozono; 7 Shota Dobayashi; 10 Tai Sasaki; 33 Ryosuke Kikuchi; 95 Elehuris Montero; Outfielders: 9 Shogo Akiyama; 37 Takayoshi Noma; 52 Shota Suekane; 59 Minoru Ohmori; 61 Sandro Fabian; 96 Shosei Nakamura; Manager: 25 Takahiro Arai; Coaches Head coach: 77 Akihito Fujii; Outfield defense/Base running: 80 Masato Akamatsu; Infield defense/Base running: 90 Takumi Miyoshi; Hitting: 83 Toyo Asayama; 89 Tetsuya Kokubo; Pitching: 74 Katsuhiro Nagakawa; 86 Tsuyoshi Kikuchihara; Battery: 81 Yoshiyuki Ishihara	Pitchers: 11 Taichi Saito; 17 Hayato Tsunehiro; 22 Taichi Taka; 24 Takumi Kurohara; 26 Takehisa Masuda; 28 Ryunosuke Sato; 29 Makoto Kemna; 30 Kazuki Takita; 34 Kouya Takahashi; 35 Taiki Kudoh; 38 Seiya Akagi; 39 Ginji Hasebe; 45 Ryuya Matsumoto; 46 Hayato Takagi; 47 Yuta Saitoh; 48 Makoto Aduwa; 66 Atsushi Endoh; 67 Harun Kikuchi; 70 Atsumi Hidaka; Catchers: 40 Yoshitaka Isomura; 57 Taiki Mochimaru; 62 Kanato Shimizu; 64 Shoto Takagi	Infielders: 2 Kosuke Tanaka; 44 Kota Hayashi; 49 Yuto Watanabe; 54 Atsumi Nishikawa; 58 Yuto Nakata; 63 Shodai Uchida; 69 Kounosuke Tatsumi; 93 Seita Maekawa; 94 Yusuke Satoh; 99 Shoichi Futamata; Outfielders: 51 Ren Hirakawa; 56 Shu Kubo; 60 Shunsuke Tamura; 97 Takahiro Nakamura; Manager: 71 Shinji Koh; Coaches Outfield defense/Base running: 75 Jun Hirose; Infield defense/Base running: 72 Akihiro Higashide; Hitting: 84 Ryota Arai; Head/Hitting/Base running: 85 Kazuki Fukuchi; Pitching: 82 Ryuji Yokoyama; 87 Ken Takahashi; Battery: 76 Yoshikazu Kura; Third squad Supervisor: 78 Tatsumi Une; Development pitching strengthening: 73 Kanei Kobayashi; Position player: 91 Yuichiro Mukae; Development pitching/Analist: 92 Yusuke Nomura
Development Players
120 Takeru Sugita (P); 121 Norihiko Nabara (OF); 122 Toshiki Yasutake (C); 123 Tsubasa Kobune (P); 124 Yuta Kobayashi (C); 126 Kaito Takeshita (P); 127 Kei Kawano (P); 128 Mirai Sugihara (P); 130 Moises Ramirez (IF); 131 Nelson Robert (OF)
Updated January 20, 2026		→ All NPB rosters

Tokyo Yakult Swallows roster
First team		Second team
Pitchers: 12 Taichi Ishiyama; 18 Yasunobu Okugawa; 20 Naofumi Kizawa; 21 Kojiro Yoshimura; 29 Yasuhiro Ogawa; 30 Kōta Shōji; 34 Kazuto Taguchi; 40 Hirotoshi Takanashi; 41 Takuya; 43 Shota Masui; 45 Reiji Kozawa; 58 Nash Walters; 66 Kosuke Sakaguchi; Catchers: 2 Yudai Koga; 27 Yuhei Nakamura; 52 Seiya Hashimoto	Infielders: 00 Yoshihiro Akahane; 1 Tetsuto Yamada; 3 Sōma Uchiyama; 8 Eigoro Mogi; 10 Takeshi Miyamoto; 13 José Osuna; 38 Takumi Ishii; 60 Ryusei Takeoka; 67 Ryui Ito; Outfielders: 0 Hidetaka Namiki; 25 Domingo Santana; 63 Shu Masuda; 64 Yukihiro Iwata; Manager: 88 Takahiro Ikeyama; Coaches: 73 Shingo Kawabata (head); 72 Chikara Onodera (pitching); 98 Hirotoshi Ishii (pitching); 78 Shoitsu Omatsu (chief hitting); 74 Shigeru Sugimura (hitting); 80 Yuji Yoshioka (hitting); 86 Suguru Ino (battery); 75 Takayuki Terauchi (infield defense/baserunning); 82 Yuichi Matsumoto (outfield defense/baserunning/strategy)	Pitchers: 11 José Quijada; 15 Yuto Nakamura; 17 Noboru Shimizu; 19 Masanori Ishikawa; 24 Tomoya Hoshi; 26 Taichi Yamano; 28 Kengo Matsumoto; 33 Taiyo Yamazaki; 35 Yuki Ishihara; 44 Hiroki Ohnishi; 46 Haruki Ohmichi; 47 Keiji Takahashi; 49 Rengo Suzuki; 53 Hiroki Hasegawa; 56 Takumi Sakamoto; 61 Ruito Iida; 62 Jesús Liranzo; 68 Shōta Maruyama; 69 Shunsuke Shimokawa; 70 Yu Hirosawa; 71 Shōhei Numata; 99 Koyo Aoyagi; Catchers: 32 Naoki Matsumoto; 48 Tomoya Kakinuma; 57 Taijiro Yano; 65 Kyō Suzuki	Infielders: 6 Ayuto Matsushita; 7 Hideki Nagaoka; 37 Kakeru Yamanobe; 39 Reo Matsukawa; 50 Keigo Kitamura; 54 Haruto Tanaka; Outfielders: 4 Kazuya Maruyama; 9 Yasutaka Shiomi; 31 Nikita Moiseev; 36 Ruito Nishimura; 42 Ren Sawai; Manager: 79 Noriyuki Shiroishi; Coaches: 79 Noriyuki Shiroishi (chief); 89 Tomohito Ito (pitching coordinator); 81 Itsuki Shoda (head pitching); 92 Tetsuya Yamamoto (pitching); 83 Atsushi Kinugawa (battery); 76 Ryuji Miyade (hitting); 87 Tomochika Tsuboi (hitting); 95 Katsuyuki Dobashi (infield defence/baserunning); 77 Kotaro Yamasaki (outfield defense/baserunning); 91 Yoshinori (pitching/development); 85 Naomichi Nishiura (hitting/development)
Development Players
013 Hyūga Takeyama (P); 014 Kota Nishidate (P); 015 Yume Komiya (P); 016 Yusei Nishihama (P); 017 Shōsei (P); 019 Takuma Sato (P); 022 Ryunosuke Matsumoto (C); 023 Kiyoharu Sawano (IF); 024 Montell (OF); 025 Tatsunori Negishi (IF); 026 Sota Takano (IF); 027 Takuma Nakagawa (C)
Updated March 24, 2026		→ All NPB rosters

Yokohama DeNA BayStars roster
First team		Second team
Pitchers: 11 Katsuki Azuma; 13 Hiromu Ise; 19 Yasuaki Yamasaki; 20 Yuya Sakamoto; 30 Kentaro Shinogi; 36 Shuto Ogata; 39 Naoki Wakamatsu; 49 José Ruiz; 54 Yutaro Ishida; 59 Kentarō Taira; 62 Sean Reynolds; 64 Koh Nakagawa; 65 Daita Miyagi; 68 Masaki Iwata; 92 Hayato Horioka; Catchers: 5 Shion Matsuo; 10 Yasutaka Tobashira; 60 Takeru Furuichi	Infielders: 9 Yōta Kyōda; 25 Yoshi Tsutsugo; 26 Masaki Mimori; 31 Tatsuhiro Shibata; 40 Tomoya Inoue; 44 Taiki Ishikami; 51 Toshiro Miyazaki; Outfielders: 4 Ryuki Watarai; 7 Keita Sano; 8 Kazuki Kamizato; 28 Atsushi Katsumata; 61 Tatsuo Ebina; 99 Cooper Hummel; Manager: 81 Ryoji Aikawa; Coaches: 72 Kenjiro Tsuruoka (Offense chief); 80 Ryoji Aikawa (Defense chief / Battery); 79 Shinji Ohara (Pitching chief); 90 Iwao Ohmura (Hitting); 97 Hiroyasu Tanaka (Infield / Baserunning); 74 Yusuke Kawada (Outfield / Baserunning); 73 Kazuya Fujita (Development Coordinator / Hitting); 94 Yota Kosugi (Pitching); 71 Ken Katoh (Battery)	Pitchers: 0 Jon Duplantier; 12 Yu Takeda; 14 Kenta Ishida; 15 Shunya Shimada; 16 Shinichi Ohnuki; 18 Kenta Kozono; 22 Taisei Irie; 24 Teruki Yoshino; 27 Shintaro Fujinami; 33 Riku Takeda; 35 Tatsuya Hashimoto; 38 Ryoto Matsumoto; 41 Chihaya Sasaki; 42 Austin Cox; 43 Osuke Fukazawa; 45 Kohei Morihara; 46 Kasuga Sakaguchi; 47 Hiromi Katayama; 53 Hayate Nakagawa; 93 Haruto Shoji; 98 Hansel Marcelino; Catchers: 32 Kyosuke Mashiko; 57 Junpei Azuma; 95 Ryuhei Kuki	Infielders: 00 Takuma Hayashi; 2 Shugo Maki; 3 Koichiro Oda; 6 Keito Mori; 34 Asahi Miyashita; 37 Hibiki Katoh; 48 Shuto Naruse; 56 Manato Tanai; Outfielders: 55 Kento Inoue; 58 Kōki Kajiwara; 63 Taiki Sekine; 67 Shōnosuke Hama; Manager: 75 Shuichi Murata; Coaches: 70 Toshiya Tsuji (Hitting); 87 Shigeru Kaga (Pitching assistant); 88 Yusaku Iriki (Pitching chief); 85 Shigeo Yanagida (Infield / Baserunning); 78 Tatsuya Shindo (Infield / Baserunning); 77 Takanori Suzuki (Development Coordinator / Hitting); 86 Yoshiki Yagi (Pitching); 84 Yoshinori Ueda (Outfield / Baserunning) (Hitting); 89 Daisuke Nakai (Outfield / Baserunning) (Offense chief); (Patrol): 82 Takashi Manei (Training Coordinator / Fielding); 79 Shinji Ohara {(Patrol / Hitting); 76 Tomio Tashiro (Hitting)
Development Players
052 Masumi Hamachi (P); 102 Manato Shimizu (P); 103 Kōki Kanabuchi (P); 106 Aki Watanabe (P); 115 Kosuke Baba (P); 125 Soh Ogasawara (IF); 127 Ryota Joko (C); 129 Kenji Nishimaki (IF); 130 Taiga Kondoh (C); 131 Uta Shimizu (IF); 136 Ryudai Morishita (P); 140 Ryunosuke Matsumoto (P); 155 Daiki Kobari (OF); 193 Ikumi Takamizawa (IF)
Updated June 3, 2026		→ All NPB rosters

Yomiuri Giants roster
First team		Second team
Pitchers: 15 Taisei; 17 Yuhi Nishidate; 19 Iori Yamasaki; 20 Shosei Togo; 41 Kōta Nakagawa; 45 Eito Tanaka; 49 Alberto Baldonado; 57 Shunsuke Miyahara; 58 Hiromasa Funabasama; 66 Ryuta Heinai; 92 Raidel Martínez; Catchers: 22 Seiji Kobayashi; 24 Takumi Ohshiro; 27 Yukinori Kishida	Infielders: 0 Daiki Masuda; 2 Naoki Yoshikawa; 6 Hayato Sakamoto; 23 Yusei Ishizuka; 29 Bobby Dalbec; 32 Shunsuke Urata; 35 Yuta Izuguchi; 52 Richard; Outfielders: 8 Yoshihiro Maru; 9 Go Matsumoto; 13 Trey Cabbage; 40 Raito Nakayama; 44 Shunsuke Sasaki; 59 Gakuto Wakabayashi; Manager: 83 Shinnosuke Abe; Coaches: 76 Tomohiro Nioka (Head coach); 93 Tetsuya Matsumoto (Hitting); 86 Shigeyuki Furuki (Infield / Baserunning); 81 Toshiya Sugiuchi (Pitching); 88 Kazunari Sanematsu (Battery); 79 Yoshiyuki Kamei (Outfield / Baserunning); 77 Tetsuya Utsumi (Pitching); 74 Yoshinori Murata (Strategy / Bullpen)	Pitchers: 11 Masahiro Tanaka; 21 Kazuyuki Takemaru; 26 Forrest Whitley; 28 Spencer Howard; 30 Ren Tawa; 31 Yuji Akahoshi; 36 Kyohei Yamashiro; 42 Bryan Mata; 43 Takahiro Norimoto; 46 Teppei Mataki; 47 Shunya Morita; 48 Elvis Luciano; 53 Yuhei Takanashi; 54 Keito Matsuura; 56 Ryuji Kitaura; 62 Kai Yokogawa; 63 Keisuke Izumi; 64 Ryusei Yamada; 65 Tatsuya Ishikawa; 91 Kenshin Hotta; 95 Natsuki Toda; 97 Haruto Inoue; Catchers: 10 Takuya Kai; 37 Takuya Kōri; 67 Shinnosuke Yamase	Infielders: 00 Dai Yuasa; 5 Makoto Kadowaki; 33 Yuto Kohama; 60 Yū Aramaki; 61 Riku Masuda; 68 Kisara Utsunomiya; 99 Kento Fujii; Outfielders: 12 Masaya Hagio; 38 Yūki Okada; 39 Gakuto Minagawa; 51 Shogo Asano; 69 Kota Hirayama; 96 Rui Mitsuka; Manager: 73 Masumi Kuwata (Second squad); 70 Norihiro Komada (Third squad); Coaches Second squad: 78 Masahiro Kawai (Head coach); 71 Tetsuya Yamaguchi (Pitching); 72 Kan Otake (Pitching); 80 Kenji Yano (Hitting); 85 Ryota Wakiya (Infield); 82 Takahiro Suzuki (Outfield / Baserunning); 87 Itaru Hashimoto (Outfield / Hitting); 89 Ken Katoh (Battery); Third squad: 100 Koichi Misawa (Pitching); 107 Soichiro Tateoka (Infield / Baserunning); 105 Daiki Yoshikawa (Outfield / Baserunning); 104 Ryoma Nogami (Pitching); 103 Tatsuhiko Kinjō (Batter coach); 102 Tomoya Ichikawa (Battery); Patrol Coaches: 84 Yasuo Kubo (Pitching/ Assistant Trainer); 110 Zelous Wheeler (Hitting coordinator)
Development Players
69 Misaki Sasahara; 94 Ryusuke Kita; 98 Yamato Suzuki; 90 Juza Ishida; 99 Makoto Kyomoto; 002 Ayumu Nakata (IF); 004 Gen Murayama (IF); 005 Yuya Tanoue (IF); 006 Hayato Sakamoto (C); 008 Hakuto Aizawa (IF); 010 Ryoya Ohtsu (C); 012 Katsunari Miura (P); 013 Julian Tima (OF); 014 Shotaro Horie (P); 015 Keishin Suzuki (P); 016 Takahiro Chiba (P); 018 Motoya Kinoshita (P); 019 Atsuki Sonoda (P); 021 Hayate Matsui (P); 022 Keita Kameda (C); 023 Tomoki Tamura (P); 024 Tatsuya Sakamoto (C); 025 Raia Takeshita (IF); 026 Yusefu Yoshimura (P); 027 Rio Kitamura (IF); 028 Ryu Tomida (P); 029 Ayumu Nishikawa (P); 030 Shido Fukita (P); 034 Tessei Morimoto (P); 041 Huang Chin-hao (P); 042 Francis Guzmán (P); 044 Gen Ohshiro (OF); 047 Eiji Kamouchi (P); 049 Christían Feliz (IF); 051 Hidetora Funakoshi (OF); 054 Daisuke Naoe (P); 063 Yuki Hanada (P); 068 Yamato Shiroki (P); 077 Hayato Ishita (P)
Updated January 24, 2026		→ All NPB rosters

== Pacific League ==
Chiba Lotte Marines roster
First team		Second team
Pitchers: 11 José Castillo; 14 Kazuya Ojima; 15 Rikuto Yokoyama; 33 Akira Yagi; 34 Shūta Takano; 36 Kōshirō Sakamoto; 37 Fumiya Ono; 42 Andre Jackson; 47 Shōta Suzuki; 52 Naoya Masuda; 54 Keisuke Sawada; 56 Shunsuke Nakamori; 58 Tokito Kawamura; 64 Kōshirō Hiroike; 73 Sam Long; Catchers: 2 Kou Matsukawa; 32 Toshiya Satoh; 65 Ryūsei Terachi	Infielders: 00 Raito Ikeda; 4 Atsuki Tomosugi; 5 Hisanori Yasuda; 10 Kyūto Ueda; 44 Ryūsei Miyazaki; 57 Ryūsei Ogawa; 99 Neftalí Soto; Outfielders: 1 Kyōta Fujiwara; 6 Mishō Nishikawa; 50 Aito; 51 Kōki Yamaguchi; 63 Kōshirō Wada; Manager: 86 Saburō; Coaches: 90 Hidekazu Mitsuyama (Head/Chief battery); 77 Tsuyoshi Nishioka (Chief batting/base running); 80 Hideaki Matsuyama (Chief infield defense/base running); 84 Tomohiro Kuroki (Pitching); 71 Hiroyuki Kobayashi (Pitching); 88 Kenta Kurihara (Batting); 76 Naoya Emura (Battery); 87 Shunichi Nemoto (Infield defense/base running); 74 Shōta Ishimine (Outfield defense/base running)	Pitchers: 13 Kaito Mouri; 16 Atsuki Taneichi; 18 Genki Ishigaki; 19 Yūki Karakawa; 21 Shūta Ishikawa; 24 Yūsuke Azuma; 28 Riku Kikuchi; 29 Yūji Nishino; 30 Atsuya Hirohata; 31 Hikaru Ohtani; 35 Haruya Tanaka; 40 Raito Okumura; 41 Rikima Ichijō; 46 Hayato Fuji; 53 Yūto Kimura; 59 Oto Hayasaka; 60 Yamato; 62 Haru Sakai; 66 Hayato Miyazaki; 91 Yūto Yoshikawa; Catchers: 27 Tatsuhiro Tamura; 45 Shōta Ueda; 69 Ryōju Okamura	Infielders: 7 Yūdai Fujioka; 8 Shōgo Nakamura; 38 Tsuyoshi Yamasaki; 43 Masami Ishigaki; 49 Yū Tatematsu; 55 Yūya Sakurai; 67 Kenta Chatani; Outfielders: 0 Akito Takabe; 3 Katsuya Kakunaka; 22 Gregory Polanco; 23 Shingo Ishikawa; 25 Hiromi Oka; 39 Kouta Inoue; 61 Daito Yamamoto; Manager: 70 Kazuya Fukuura (General batting); Coaches: 78 Kenji Ōtonari (Pitching); 79 Takahiro Matsunaga (Pitching); 81 Manabu Mima (Pitching); 85 Masaki Minami (Development/pitching); 75 Kōichi Hori (Batting); 82 Kei Hosoya (Batting); 89 Takeshi Kanazawa (Battery); 72 Ryō Miki (Infield defense/base running); 83 Kenji Morozumi (Outfield defense/base running)
Development Players
121 Fumiya Motomae (P); 122 Ryōtarō Mori (P); 123 Seiun Akiyama (P); 124 Ryōta Nakamura (P); 125 Kirato Nagashimada (P); 126 Yūto Nakayama (P); 127 Kaishū Takahashi (P); 131 Yūta Ibaragi (P); 132 Kōsuke Nagashima (P); 133 Ryōta Takeuchi (P); 139 Chariel Radney (P); 137 Kōnoshin Tomiyama (C); 120 Yūta Kaneda (IF); 129 Rui Katsumata (IF); 130 Tsuyoshi Tanimura (IF); 134 Shinya Matsuishi (IF); 128 Ryō Sugiyama (OF); 135 Hikaru Kohno (OF); 136 Kazuki Fujita (OF); 140 Stiven Acevedo (OF)
Updated July 2, 2026		→ All NPB rosters

Fukuoka SoftBank Hawks roster
First team		Second team
Pitchers: 10 Naoyuki Uwasawa; 11 Yūki Tsumori; 19 Ryōsuke Ohtsu; 26 Gōta Suzuki; 27 Shunsuke Iwai; 30 Toshiya Nakamura; 40 Kazuki Sugiyama; 41 Yūgo Maeda; 42 Yūsuke Itoh; 49 Haru Matsumoto; 54 Roberto Osuna; 59 Fūga Ohtake; 64 Taiga Kamichatani; 66 Yūki Matsumoto; Catchers: 00 Riku Watanabe; 45 Kenta Tanigawara; 62 Takashi Umino	Infielders: 0 Hikaru Kawase; 4 Jeter Downs; 6 Kenta Imamiya; 8 Taisei Makihara; 24 Ryōya Kurihara; 25 Yūdai Shōji; 33 Ryūta Hirose; 99 Isami Nomura; Outfielders: 3 Kensuke Kondoh; 9 Yūki Yanagita; 23 Ukyō Shūtō; 31 Tomoya Masaki; 32 Tatsuru Yanagimachi; 61 Yūto Kawamura; Manager: 90 Hiroki Kokubo; Coaches: 94 Shinji Kurano (Chief pitching/Head coordinator); 72 Kenichi Wakatabe (Bullpen pitching); 71 Kenichi Nakata (Assistant bullpen pitching); 93 Arihito Muramatsu (Chief fielding); 78 Yūya Hasegawa (Batting/skill); 80 Yūichi Honda (Infield defense/base running/strategy); 79 Takayuki Ōnishi (Outfield defense/base running/strategy); 87 Tōru Hosokawa (Battery)	Pitchers: 2 Carter Stewart Jr.; 13 Ryūta Inagawa; 16 Nao Higashihama; 18 Hsu Jo-Hsi; 20 Taito Murakami; 22 Haruto Fujiwara; 28 Shun Antoku; 29 Ryūsei Ohe; 34 Alexander Armenta; 35 Liván Moinelo; 43 Hokuto; 47 Tomohisa Ohzeki; 48 Kouya Fujii; 50 Masato Sagara; 51 Jun Maeda; 53 Ryō Ohyama; 58 Taisei Kimura; 60 Kazuo Ohno; 63 Darwinzon Hernández; 68 Hikaru Kimura; 69 Shunsuke Iwasaki; Catchers: 12 Hiroki Minei; 39 Yūdai Yamamoto; 55 Sōichirō Ishizuka; 65 Yūtarō Fujita	Infielders: 7 Akira Nakamura; 5 Hotaka Yamakawa; 36 Itua Ikhine; 46 Shinjirō Uno; 52 Yūto Akihiro; 56 Takanori Takahashi; 67 Sōma Ishimi; Outfielders: 44 Yoshiyasu Sasagawa; 57 Riku Ogata; 77 Keita Yamamoto; Manager: 88 Kazumi Saitoh (Second squad); Coaches: 73 Takashi Ogasawara (Chief pitching); 86 Masato Okumura (Pitching); 74 Shigeru Morikasa (Batting); 91 Keisuke Kaneko (Infield defense/base running); 96 Ryūma Kidokoro (Outfield defense/base running); 84 Hiroaki Takaya (Battery); Third squad: 92 Motoi Ōkoshi (Manager); 97 Felipe (Chief pitching); 76 Hayato Terahara (Pitching); 75 Noriyoshi Ohmichi (Batting); 82 Tomoki Takata (Infield defense/base running); 98 Fumikazu Takanami (Outfield defense/base running); 83 Masaumi Shimizu (Battery); Fourth squad: 014 Takashi Sasagawa (Chief/defense/base running); 013 Kazuhisa Makita (Pitching); 018 Masahiro Nakatani (Batting); Coordinators: 012 Hidetaka Kawagoe (General farm pitching); 020 Jyunji Hoshino (Pitching); 023 Hisao Arakane (General fielding); 019 Kōichi Sekikawa (Fielding); 022 Hiroyuki Mori (Fielding); 021 Tatsuya Ide (Fielding); 011 Hiroshi Narahara (General fielding advisor)
Development Players
120 Takehiro Hasegawa (P); 126 Yūwa Miyasato (P); 128 Shinichirō Kawano (P); 132 Tōya Kawaguchi (P); 134 Kenichi Murata (P); 137 Kenshirō Tsukayama (P); 138 Yūta Aihara (P); 139 Sanshirō Izaki (P); 140 Kōichirō Okada (P); 141 Ryōtarō Sawayanagi (P); 145 Hammond (P); 146 Ryūsei Ohya (P); 148 Takuma Yamasaki (P); 149 Taiga Kumagai (P); 152 Dan Shioji (P); 153 Chang Chun-Wei (P); 155 Renta Nagasaki (P); 156 Luis Rodríguez (P); 157 Sōta Tanoue (P); 160 Keishin Nagamizu (P); 161 Kaito Uchino (P); 162 Jumpei Okaue (P); 163 Akito Sasaki (P); 169 Yūsei Tobita (P); 176 Darío Sarduy (P); 125 Sou Ohtomo (C); 130 Kōta Makihara (C); 133 Kanta Ikeda (C); 171 Ryōta Morishima (C); 121 Zairen (IF); 122 Keio Fujino (IF); 124 Shūji Kuwahara (IF); 127 Yūki Hirose (IF); 129 Kyōshirō Sakura (IF); 131 Kōki Nakazawa (IF); 144 Ayumu Ezaki (IF); 150 Reo Ōhashi (IF); 159 Kyōgo Yamashita (IF); 170 Ayuma Nishio (IF); 174 Jonathan Moreno (IF); 175 David Almonte (IF); 123 Shūya Ohizumi (OF); 143 Kōha Gyofu (OF); 147 Hayato Kinoshita (OF); 151 Takahiro Suzuki (OF); 154 Ikumi (OF); 158 Emil (OF); 166 Kaito Shigematsu (OF); 168 Kōta Satoh (OF); 173 José Ozuna (OF)
Updated July 5, 2026		→ All NPB rosters

Hokkaido Nippon-Ham Fighters roster
First team		Second team
Pitchers: 12 Kōta Yazawa; 14 Takayuki Katoh; 15 Kōki Kitayama; 16 Kōta Tatsu; 17 Hiromi Itoh; 20 Kenta Uehara; 24 Shōma Kanemura; 26 Seigi Tanaka; 29 Haruki Hosono; 34 Mizuki Hori; 40 Hiroya Shimamoto; 45 Ren Fukushima; 47 Taisei Yanagawa; 48 Yukiya Saitō; 74 Kōhei Arihara; Catchers: 2 Ariel Martínez; 33 Yūya Shintoh; 60 Kengo Yoshida; 64 Yua Tamiya	Infielders: 5 Yūki Nomura; 6 Rodolfo Castro; 21 Kōtarō Kiyomiya; 43 Tatsuki Mizuno; 49 Ruan Ohtsuka; 54 Shū Yamagata; 56 Ryōhei Hosokawa; 58 Taiki Narama; Outfielders: 50 Ryōta Isobata; 53 Shun Mizutani; 66 Chūsei Mannami; 99 Franmil Reyes; Manager: 1 Tsuyoshi Shinjō; Coaches: 77 Takaya Hayashi (Head); 73 Hisashi Takeda (Pitching); 82 Takeharu Katoh (Pitching); 81 Toshitake Yokoo (Batting); 72 Katsuhiko Yamada (Battery); 85 Ryōta Yachi (Infield defense/base running); 80 Hichori Morimoto (Outfield defense/base running); 79 Tetsuya Matsumoto (Fielding); 91 Chihiro Kaneko (Pitching coordinator); 87 Tomoaki Satoh (Batting coordinator)	Pitchers: 13 Tsubasa Nabatame; 18 Sachiya Yamasaki; 19 Taishō Tamai; 25 Naoki Miyanishi; 27 Jay Ohkawa; 28 Ryūsei Kawano; 30 Sauryn Lao; 31 Reo Shibata; 32 Ryūsei Fujita; 35 Tamon Asari; 37 Gu Lin Ruei-yang; 41 Kōji Fukutani; 46 Kyōsuke Kuroyanagi; 52 Takahide Ikeda; 55 Taiki Kikuchi; 62 Daiki Shimizu; 63 Kōtarō Yamashiro; 67 Takumi Yamamoto; 93 Kōki Matsuoka; 96 Sun Yi-Lei; Catchers: 3 Yūya Gunji; 10 Yūshi Shimizu; 38 Lyle Lin; 57 Kaito Fujimori; 98 Yūki Umebayashi	Infielders: 4 Daigo Kamikawabata; 9 Takuya Nakashima; 39 Naoki Arizono; 44 Uta Sakaguchi; 51 Minato Handa; 65 Ryōsuke Myōse; Outfielders: 7 Haruki Nishikawa; 8 Daiki Asama; 36 Kazuki Miyazaki; 42 Kane Edokpolo; 61 Yūma Imagawa; Manager: 90 Atsunori Inaba; Coaches: 78 Masaji Shimizu (General); 83 Hiroshi Urano (Pitching); 92 Takayoshi Eguchi (Pitching); 75 Tomoyuki Oda (Batting); 71 Naoki Matoba (Battery); 84 Manabu Iwadate (Infield defense/base running); 76 Toshimasa Konta (Outfield defense/base running)
Development Players
113 Yamato Katoh (P); 114 Ryōdai Matsumoto (P); 115 Kotarō Seimiya (P); 117 Haruki Miyauchi (P); 121 Sorato Kawakatsu (P); 122 Junki Shibuya (P); 124 Towa Yokoyama (P); 140 Suguru Fukuda (P); 154 Kanato Anzai (P); 159 Haruka Nemoto (P); 111 Taiki Hamada (IF); 123 Hiroki Tsuneya (IF); 125 Taisei Fujita (OF); 127 Ataru Yamaguchi (OF); 168 Hinode Hoshino (OF)
Updated July 5, 2026		→ All NPB rosters

Orix Buffaloes roster
First team		Second team
Pitchers: 00 Anderson Espinoza; 15 Ren Mukunoki; 21 Sōichirō Yamazaki; 22 Allen Kuri; 29 Daiki Tajima; 40 Shō Iwasaki; 42 Andrés Machado; 49 Raiku Katayama; 65 Riku Miyaguni; 66 Hiroshi; 69 Sean Hjelle; 93 Kazuma Satoh; 95 Kaito Saiki; 96 Taito Takashima; 98 Ryūsei Gonda; Catchers: 2 Kenya Wakatsuki; 4 Tomoya Mori; 32 Shō Fukunaga; 50 Ryōma Yamanaka	Infielders: 1 Ryō Ohta; 5 Masahiro Nishino; 6 Yūma Mune; 9 Tomoya Noguchi; 24 Kōtarō Kurebayashi; 45 Bob Seymour; 67 Keita Nakagawa; Outfielders: 0 Haruto Watanabe; 7 Ryōma Nishikawa; 33 Ryū Sugisawa; 38 Ryōto Kita; 61 Shōta Hiranuma; Manager: 71 Mamoru Kishida; Coaches: 81 Toshio Haru (Head); 88 Katsumi Mizumoto (Roving coordinator); 87 Toshio Saitoh (General); 75 Kazuyuki Atsuzawa (Pitching); 77 Motoki Higa (Pitching); 73 Rui Makino (Pitching); 72 Masafumi Hirai (Pitching); 16 Yoshihisa Hirano (Pitching); 78 Ikki Shimamura (Batting); 82 Keizo Kawashima (Batting); 85 Shinji Takahashi (Batting); 79 Masakazu Fukukawa (Batting); 83 Ryōichi Adachi (Infield defense/base running); 80 Shūhei Kojima (Infield defense/base running); 70 Yūsuke Matsui (Outfield defense/base running); 86 Shintarō Yoshida (Outfield defense/base running); 74 Katsuki Yamazaki (Battery); 97 Masato Matsui (Battery)	Pitchers: 11 Shunpeita Yamashita; 12 Kōhei Azuma; 13 Naruki Teranishi; 16 Yoshihisa Hirano; 17 Ryūhei Sotani; 18 Hiroya Miyagi; 19 Taisuke Yamaoka; 20 Shōta Abe; 23 Kōsei Yoshida; 26 Kyōsuke Saitō; 28 Ryōga Tomiyama; 31 Atsuya Fujikawa; 35 Seiryū Kotajima; 36 Haruki Mori; 41 Ryūga Satoh; 43 Shū Takaya; 47 Reo Yamaguchi; 48 Kaisei Toumatsu; 52 Kaede Yokoyama; 57 Nobuyoshi Yamada; 59 Luis Perdomo; 68 Kaito Iriyama; 94 Kento Kawase; Catchers: 37 Ryō Ishikawa; 44 Yūma Tongū; 60 Shikira Nogami; 62 Shūna Hori	Infielders: 10 Kōji Ohshiro; 25 Hō Naitō; 30 Taishi Hirooka; 34 Seiya Yokoyama; 53 Shō Gibo; Outfielders: 8 Yūsuke Mugitani; 39 Ryōma Ikeda; 58 Yosuke Kubota; 99 Yūtarō Sugimoto; Manager: 76 Naoyuki Kazaoka; Coaches: 89 Hiroshi Kobayashi (Chief); 90 Yūya Oda; 84 Kōhei Suzuki; 91 Daisuke Iida
Development Players
002 Matthew (P); 004 Issei Watanabe (P); 017 Chen Mu-Heng (P); 041 Hiroto Suga (P); 044 Taketo Ashida (P); 053 Taiga Uehara (P); 056 Kento Inui (P); 120 Atsuya Kogita (P); 121 Yūki Udagawa (P); 123 Hitomi Honda (P); 128 Yuito Mae (P); 129 Reiji Higashiyama (P); 135 Kōsuke Kawachi (P); 034 Kyōichirō Murakami (C); 055 Kōsuke Tajima (C); 003 Souta Nakanishi (IF); 045 Sōta Kawano (IF); 051 Tomoki Imasaka (IF); 052 Musashi Shimizu (IF); 122 Kōsei Ohsato (IF); 124 Joh Endoh (IF); 126 Kazuya Katsuki (IF); 001 Haruto Mikata (OF); 054 Seiichi Teramoto (OF); 127 Kendai Gen (OF)
Updated July 2, 2026		→ All NPB rosters

Saitama Seibu Lions roster
First team		Second team
Pitchers: 11 Taiga Ueda; 12 Yūtarō Watanabe; 13 Kōna Takahashi; 16 Chihiro Sumida; 21 Natsuki Takeuchi; 28 Ryōsuke Moriwaki; 34 Hiroshi Kaino; 41 Haruse Narita; 45 Trey Wingenter; 52 Hibiki Shinohara; 57 Masaya Kuroda; 58 Yūta Nakamura; 61 Kaima Taira; 70 Taishi Mameda; Catchers: 10 Taiga Kojima; 22 Yūto Koga; 37 Sena Tsuge	Infielders: 00 Keisuke Nakata; 4 Kazunari Ishii; 5 Shūta Tonosaki; 6 Sōsuke Genda; 26 Tyler Nevin; 39 Taiga Hirasawa; 62 Natsuo Takizawa; Outfielders: 7 Masayuki Kuwahara; 8 Seiya Watanabe; 25 Alexander Canario; 51 Manaya Nishikawa; 68 Junichirō Kishi; 73 Lin An-ko; Manager: 74 Fumiya Nishiguchi; Coaches: 91 Yūsuke Torigoe (Head); 81 Kiyoshi Toyoda (Chief pitching); 95 Tatsuya Ōishi (Pitching); 96 Shōta Nakata (Battery); 78 Toshihisa Nishi (Chief fielding/batting); 83 Yoshiie Tachibana (Batting); 87 Satoshi Kuroda (Infield defense/base running); 84 Masato Kumashiro (Outfield defense/base running)	Pitchers: 15 Kaito Yoza; 17 Wataru Matsumoto; 19 Shunsuke Satō; 20 Hakua Iwaki; 23 Ryōta Itogawa; 29 Minato Aoyama; 30 Allan Winans; 36 Haruto Yamada; 40 Keita Horikoshi; 42 Bo Takahashi; 43 Shinnosuke Hada; 46 Shōma Kariu; 47 Haruki Sugiyama; 54 Yūta Kuroki; 56 Emmanuel Ramírez; 67 Yamato Fuji; 71 Shinya Sugai; 75 Sou Satoh; 90 Shōta Hamaya; Catchers: 27 Ginjirō Sumitani; 53 Shōya Makino; 64 Haruki Tatsuyama	Infielders: 0 Ryōsuke Kodama; 2 Hiroto Saitō; 32 Takayoshi Yamamura; 38 Taiyō Satō; 50 Wataru Takamatsu; 59 Sōwa Yokota; 60 Takeya Nakamura; 99 Reon Murata; Outfielders: 1 Takumi Kuriyama; 9 Takuya Hiruma; 31 Tokumasa Chano; 33 Yūdai Furukawa; 35 Shun Akiyama; 44 Lin Kuan-Chen; 55 Yūta Nakami; 63 Shinya Hasegawa; 66 Yūshin Kawada; Manager: 79 Tatsuya Ozeki; Coaches: 72 Yoshihiro Doi (General pitching); 98 Tomio Watanabe (Pitching); 93 Hayato Aoki (Pitching); 85 Daiki Enokida (Pitching); 77 Ryūtarō Tsuji (General fielding); 82 Kōsuke Noda (Fielding); 86 Shōgo Akada (Fielding); 88 Hiroyuki Ōshima (Fielding); 80 Keiji Ōbiki (Fielding); Third squad: 97 Tomoshi Aoki (Chief); 76 Norio Tanabe (Fielding); 94 Yūji Onizaki (Fielding); 89 Fumikazu Kimura (Fielding); 92 Masatoshi Okada (Fielding)
Development Players
114 Towa Uema (P); 115 Takeru Sasaki (P); 117 Taisei Miyazawa (P); 118 Keishin Saitō (P); 121 Daiki Miura (P); 124 Sohta Hamaoka (P); 125 Sinclair (P); 129 Masahiro Kawashimo (P); 131 Shōta Kise (P); 134 Yūma Masaki (P); 136 Rei Takahashi (P); 141 Musa (P); 142 Fred (P); 144 Jorge González (P); 145 Ronny Oliver (P); 113 Kaito Noda (C); 120 Daiju Nomura (C); 122 Ryōsuke Koresawa (C); 111 Yuito Arai (IF); 112 Takumu Imaoka (IF); 119 Teruki Koga (IF); 126 Asahi Taniguchi (IF); 130 Kōji Kaneko (IF); 138 Haruma Fukuo (IF); 140 Juan Corniel (IF); 116 Kōichi Okumura (OF); 132 Ramal (OF); 135 Ginto Andō (OF); 137 Haruto Sawada (OF); 139 Okem (OF); 143 Carlos (OF)
Updated July 2, 2026		→ All NPB rosters

Tohoku Rakuten Golden Eagles roster
First team		Second team
Pitchers: 13 Sōta Fujiwara; 15 Roansy Contreras; 19 Kōsei Shōji; 26 Haruto Nakagomi; 41 Ren Kajiya; 45 Ryu Kutani; 46 Shōma Fujihira; 49 Masaya Nishigaki; 54 Naoki Hinata; 59 Katsutoshi Tai; 71 Daichi Shibata; Catchers: 2 Hikaru Ohta; 55 YG Yasuda; 65 Kengo Horiuchi	Infielders: 0 Hiroto Kobukata; 3 Hideto Asamura; 6 Itsuki Murabayashi; 7 Daichi Suzuki; 24 Fumiya Kurokawa; 35 Yoshiaki Watanabe; 48 Ryūya Taira; 60 Waters; 73 Kohtarō Komori; Outfielders: 8 Ryōsuke Tatsumi; 32 Daisuke Nakashima; 34 Carson McCusker; 50 Atsuki Mutoh; Manager: 81 Masato Yoshii; Coaches: 86 Tatsuya Shiokawa (Head); 89 Hiroshi Watanabe (Batting); 76 Tatsuya Shimozono (Batting); 84 Yūhei (Batting); 94 Katsumi Yamashita (Batting); 91 Yūya Kubo (Pitching); 80 Takashi Ishii (Pitching); 92 Chikara Onodera (Pitching); 81 Kōji Aoyama (Pitching); 96 Takahiro Shiomi (Pitching); 93 Suguru Ino (Battery); 97 Takahiro Shimotsuma (Battery); 95 Ryōsuke Morioka (Infield defense/base running); 83 Masato Watanabe (Infield defense/base running); 99 Shinichi Kawana (Outfield defense/base running); 85 Akihisa Makida (Outfield defense/base running)	Pitchers: 11 Takayuki Kishi; 17 Tatsuki Koja; 18 Kenta Maeda; 20 Tatsuki Itoh; 21 Takahisa Hayakawa; 22 José Ureña; 28 Tomohito Sakai; 29 Chiharu Tanaka; 31 Shōta Watanabe; 40 Masahiro Ehara; 43 Sung Chia-hao; 47 Masaru Fujii; 52 Taisei Tsurusaki; 53 Haruto Sakai; 56 Sora Suzuki; 57 Ryōta Takinaka; 58 Wataru Karashima; 61 Kōsei Koga; 62 Naoto Nishiguchi; 64 Yūki Hayashi; 66 Ryuta Konno; 67 Seiya Ohuchi; 69 Seiryū Uchi; 79 Taisei Itoh; Catchers: 27 Hikaru Itoh; 44 Takaya Tanaka; 70 Tsuyoshi Ishihara; 72 Toshiya Ohsakae	Infielders: 1 Rui Muneyama; 9 Luke Voit; 30 Akira Shigenaga; 39 Yukiya Itoh; 63 Daiki Irie; 68 Takumi Aono; 75 Yang Po-hsiang; 98 Kyōsuke Kaneko; Outfielders: 25 Kazuki Tanaka; 36 Tsubasa Yoshinoh; 38 Naoki Satō; 42 Shoya Sakaue; 51 Yūya Ogoh; 78 Sōshi Yoshino; Manager: 74 Naoto Watanabe; Coaches: 87 Yasunaga Makishi (General development); 90 Fumitoshi Takano (Development)
Development Players
029 Kazuto Tokuyama (P); 061 Takuma Matsuda (P); 133 Takuma Nakazawa (P); 197 Hsiao Chi (P); 022 Kei Mizukami (C); 122 Taiga Shimahara (C); 132 Yūya Kishimoto (IF); 079 Ginji Maeda (OF); 126 Daita Horomura (OF); 129 Shion Ohtsubo (OF)
Updated July 5, 2026		→ All NPB rosters

== See also ==
- Nippon Professional Baseball rosters
- List of Major League Baseball team rosters
- List of current KBO League team rosters
