= 2023 Nippon Professional Baseball draft =

Japanese baseball draft event

2023 Nippon Professional Baseball Draft
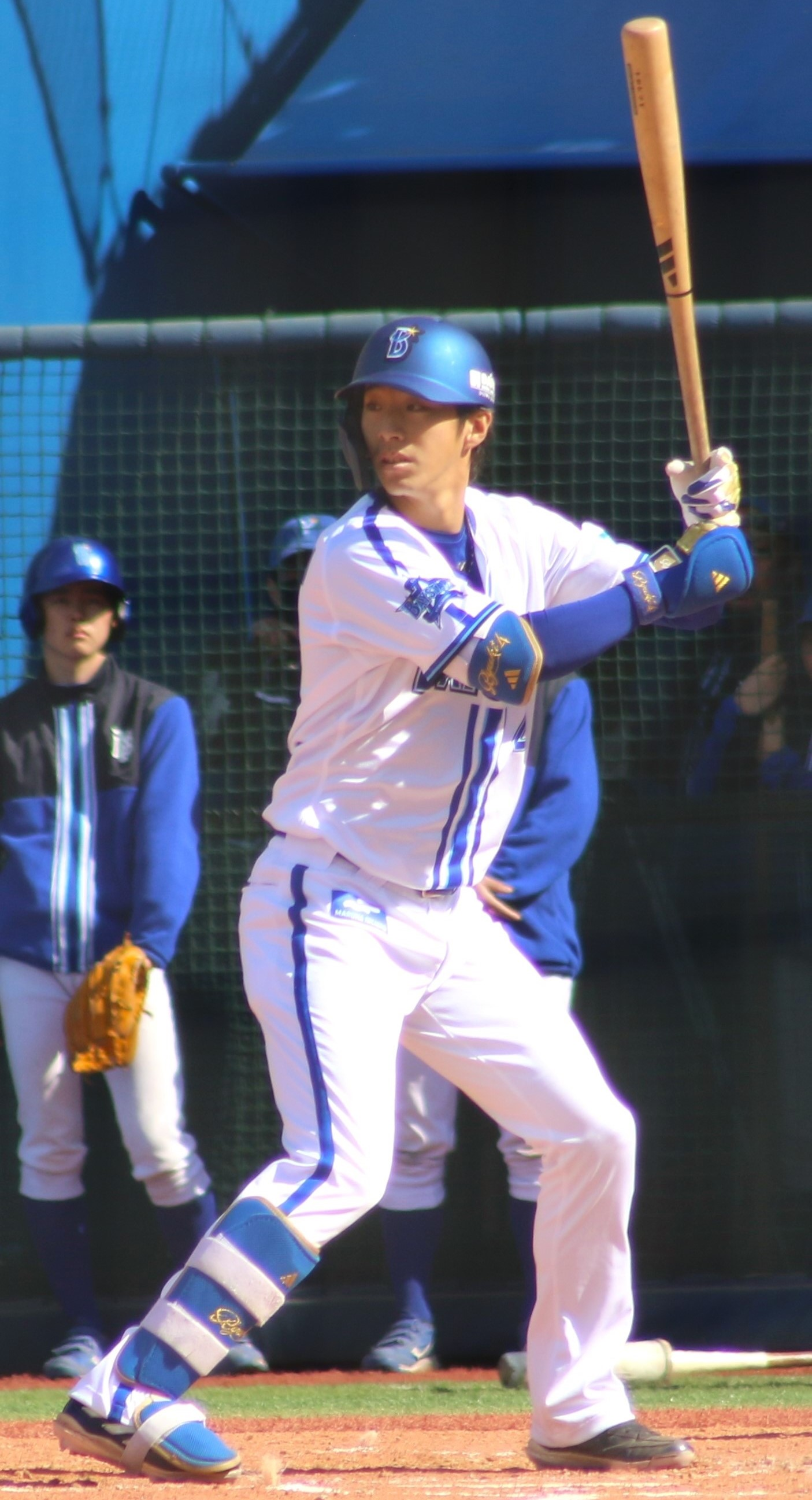
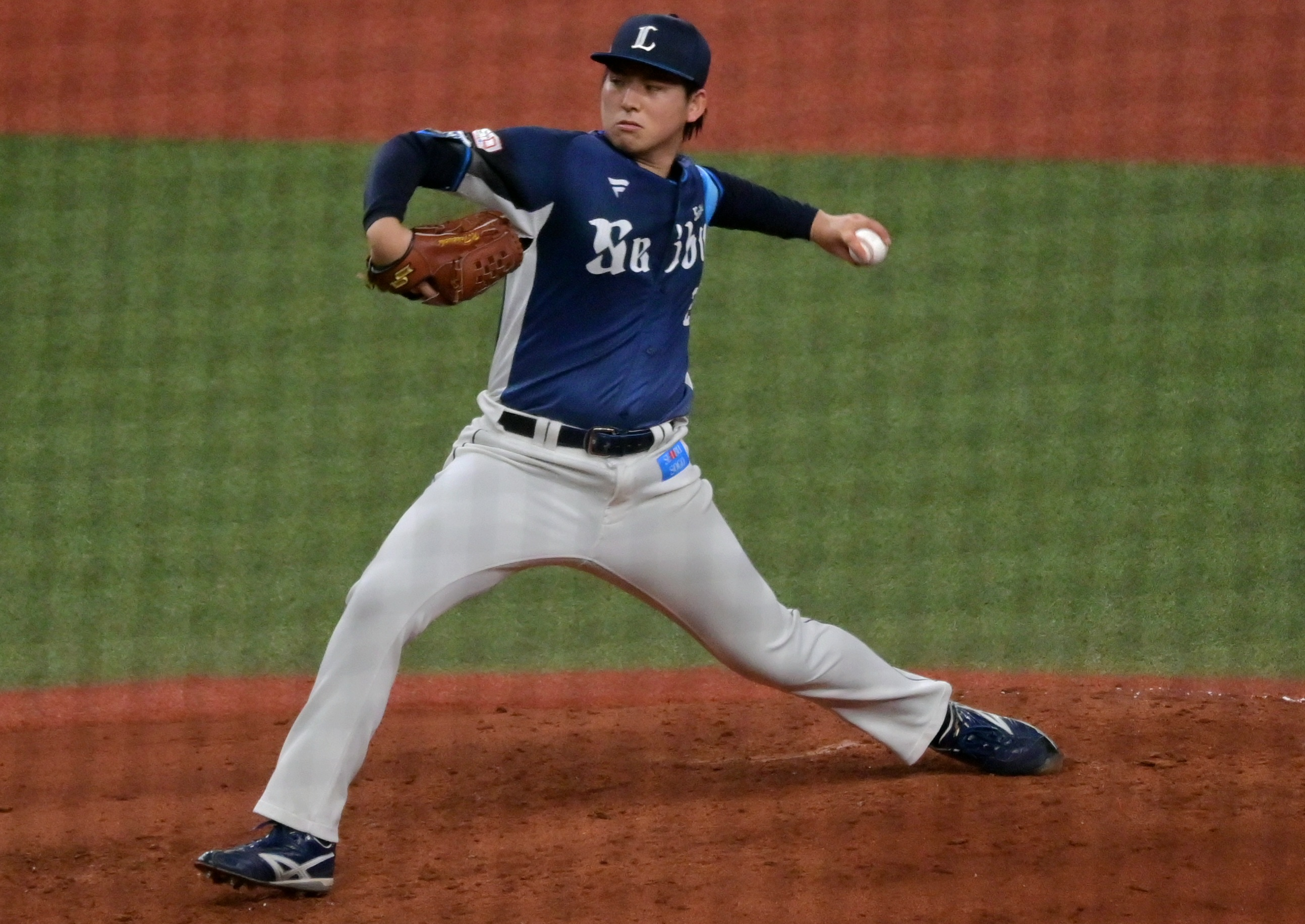
- Ryuki Watarai and Natsuki Takeuchi, who were each nominated by three different teams in the first round bid lottery.

General information
- Sport: Baseball
- Date: October 26, 2023
- Location: Grand Prince Hotel Takanawa, Tokyo
- Networks: TBS (first round), sky-A
- Sponsored by: Taisho Pharmaceutical

Overview
- 122 total selections in 16 (Includes draft for developmental players) rounds
- League: Nippon Professional Baseball
- First round selections: Ryūki Watarai, Natsuki Takeuchi (3 teams a bid lottery.); Yūhi Nishidate, Hayato Tsunehiro (2 teams a bid lottery.)

The 2023 Nippon Professional Baseball (NPB) Draft was held on October 26, 2023, for the 59th time at the Grand Prince Hotel Takanawa to assign amateur baseball players to the NPB. It was arranged with the special cooperation of Taisho Pharmaceutical with official naming rights. The draft was officially called "The Professional Baseball Draft Meeting supported by Lipovitan D ". It has been sponsored by Taisho Pharmaceutical for the 11th consecutive year since 2013.

This season's draft was held for the first time in four years with spectators in attendance. However, previously, free spectators were recruited through a lottery, but from now on, spectators will be recruited for a fee.

== Summary ==
Only the first round picks will be done by bid lottery. from 2019, the Professional Baseball Executive Committee has decided that the Central League and the Pacific League will be given the second round of waiver priority alternately every other year, and in 2023 Central League received the waiver priority. From the third round the order was reversed continuing in the same fashion until all picks were exhausted. It ends when all teams are "selected" or when the total number of selected players reaches 120. Also, if the number of players has not reached 120, we will continue to hold a "developmental squad player selection meeting" with the participation of the desired team.

== First Round Contested Picks ==
	Player name	Position	Teams selected by
First Round	Ryūki Watarai	Outfielder	Dragons, **BayStars**, Marines
First Round	Natsuki Takeuchi	Pitcher	Swallows, **Lions**, Hawks
First Round	Yūhi Nishidate	Pitcher	Fighters, **Giants**
First Round	Hayato Tsunehiro	Pitcher	Eagles, **Carp**
Second Round	Shō Kusaka	Pitcher	**Dragons**, Marines
Second Round	Yūgo Maeda	Pitcher	Eagles, **Hawks**
Third Round	Haruki Hosono	Pitcher	**Fighters**, Marines

- **Bolded** teams indicate who won the right to negotiate contract following a lottery.
- In the first round, **Kaito Shimomura** (Pitcher) was selected by the **Tigers**, and **Seiya Yokoyama** (Infielder) by the **Buffaloes** without a bid lottery.
- In the second round, **Kōta Nishidate** (Pitcher) was selected by the **Swallows** without a bid lottery.
- In the third round, **Tatsuki Koja** (Pitcher) was selected by the **Eagles** without a bid lottery.
- In the fourth round, **Kyūto Ueda** (Infielder) was selected by the **Marines**.
- List of selected players.

== Selected Players ==
Key
*	Player did not sign

- The order of the teams is the order of second round waiver priority.
- **Bolded** After that, a developmental player who contracted as a registered player under control.
- List of selected players.

=== Chunichi Dragons ===
Pick	Player name	Position	Team
#1	Shō Kusaka	Pitcher	Asia University
#2	Keishi Tsuda	Infielder	Mitsubishi Heavy Industries East
#3	Rintarō Tsujimoto	Infielder	Sendai University
#4	Kōnosuke Fukuda	Pitcher	Riseisha High School
#5	Shōta Habu	Pitcher	Ibaraki Astro Planets
#6	Ryūma Kato	Pitcher	Toho Gas
Developmental Player Draft
#1	Tōki Hiwatari	Catcher	Ibaraki Astro Planets
#2	Towa Kikuta	Pitcher	Ehime Mandarin Pirates
#3	Gōki Oda	Outfielder	Tochigi Golden Braves
#4	Rii Kawakami	Outfielder	Oita B-rings

=== Hokkaido Nippon-Ham Fighters ===
Pick	Player name	Position	Team
#1	Haruki Hosono	Pitcher	Toyo University
#2	Yuya Shintoh	Catcher	Jobu University
#3	Kazuki Miyazaki	Outfielder	Yamanashi Gakuin University
#4	Ryōsuke Myōse	Infielder	Kagoshima Josei High School
#5	Hinode Hoshino	Outfielder	Maebashi Industrial High School
Developmental Player Draft
#1	Taiki Hamada	Infielder	Kyoto International High School
#2	Daiju Hirata	Outfielder	Seta Technical High School
#3	Yamato Katō	Pitcher	Teikyo University Kani High School

=== Tokyo Yakult Swallows ===
Pick	Player name	Position	Team
#1	Kōta Nishidate	Pitcher	Senshu University
#2	Kengo Matsumoto	Pitcher	Toyota
#3	Yūki Ishihara	Pitcher	Meiji University
#4	Kyō Suzuki	Catcher	Tokoha University Kikugawa High School
#5	Ryui Itoh	Infielder	Niigata Albirex BC
Developmental Player Draft
#1	Shōsei Takahashi	Pitcher	New Taipei Municipal Yingge Vocational High School
#2	Sōta Takano	Infielder	Mitoya High School

=== Saitama Seibu Lions ===
Pick	Player name	Position	Team
#1	Natsuki Takeuchi	Pitcher	Kokugakuin University
#2	Taiga Ueda	Pitcher	Osaka University of Commerce
#3	Haruki Sugiyama	Pitcher	Yokohama High School
#4	Haruse Narita	Pitcher	Hirosaki Technical High School
#5	Taisei Miyazawa	Pitcher	Tokushima Indigo Socks
#6	Reon Murata	Infielder	Kogakkan University
#7	Ryōta Itogawa	Pitcher	ENEOS
Developmental Player Draft
#1	Kounosuke Joseph Sinclair	Pitcher	Tokushima Indigo Socks
#2	Asahi Taniguchi	Infielder	Tokushima Indigo Socks
#3	Masahiro Kawashimo	Pitcher	Hakodate University Yuto High School
#4	Kōji Kaneko	Infielder	Saitama Musashi Heat Bears
#5	Shōta Kise	Pitcher	Kitasaga High School
#6	Kōichi Okumura	Outfielder	Gunma Diamond Pegasus

=== Yomiuri Giants ===
Pick	Player name	Position	Team
#1	Yūhi Nishidate	Pitcher	Chuo University
#2	Shunya Morita	Pitcher	Honda Suzuka
#3	Shunsuke Sasaki	Outfielder	Hitachi
#4	Yūta Izuguchi	Infielder	NTT West
#5	Teppei Mataki	Pitcher	Nippon Life
Developmental Player Draft
#1	Katsuya Miura	Pitcher	Tokyo International University
#2	Gen Murayama	Infielder	Kanoya Chuo High School
#3	Kisara Utsunomiya	Infielder	Ehime Mandarin Pirates
#4	Yūya Tanoue	Infielder	Nihon University Fujisawa High School
#5	Atsuki Sonoda	Pitcher	Fukuoka Institute of Technology Jyoto High School
#6	Takahiro Chiba	Pitcher	Asahikawa Meisei High School
#7	Kōta Hirayama	Outfielder	Chiba Sky Sailors

=== Tohoku Rakuten Golden Eagles ===
Pick	Player name	Position	Team
#1	Tatsuki Koja	Pitcher	Toin University of Yokohama
#2	Haruto Sakai	Pitcher	Takigawa Daini High School
#3	Naoki Hinata	Pitcher	Tokai University Sugao High School
#4	Jumil Rikai Waters	Infielder	Nihon Wellness Okinawa High School
#5	Takuma Matsuda	Pitcher	Osaka Sangyo University
#6	Daisuke Nakashima	Outfielder	Aoyama Gakuin University
#7	Seiya Ohuchi	Pitcher	Nihon Wellness Miyagi High School
#8	Takumi Aono	Infielder	Himi High School

=== Yokohama DeNA Baystars ===
Pick	Player name	Position	Team
#1	Ryūki Watarai	Outfielder	ENEOS
#2	Ryōto Matsumoto	Pitcher	Meijo University
#3	Riku Takeda	Pitcher	Yamagata Chuo High School
#4	Taiki Ishikami	Infielder	Toyo University
#5	Yutaro Ishida	Pitcher	Chuo University
#6	Kento Inoue	Outfielder	Tokushima Indigo Socks
Developmental Player Draft
#1	Ikumi Takamizawa	Infielder	Tsuruga Kehi High School
#2	Manato Shimizu	Pitcher	Jyutoku High School
#3	Sō Ogasawara	Infielder	Kyoto Shoei High School
#4	Haruto Shōji	Pitcher	Aomori University
#5	Taiga Kondoh	Pitcher	Senshu University Kitakami High School

=== Fukuoka SoftBank Hawks ===
Pick	Player name	Position	Team
#1	Yūgo Maeda	Pitcher	Osaka Tōin High School
#2	Shunsuke Iwai	Pitcher	Meijo University
#3	Ryūta Hirose	Infielder	Keio University
#4	Kenichi Murata	Pitcher	Meiji University
#5	Ryōtarō Sawayanagi	Pitcher	Loki Techno Toyama
#6	Ryō Ōyama	Pitcher	Higashi Nippon International University
#7	Yutarō Fujita	Catcher	Fukuoka University Ohori High School
Developmental Player Draft
#1	Shūya Ōizumi	Outfielder	Fukushima RedHopes
#2	Yuwa Miyasato	Pitcher	Tokyo University of Agriculture
#3	Kyōshirō Sakura	Infielder	Kyushu International University High School
#4	Kōki Nakazawa	Infielder	Hachinohe Gakuin Kosei High School
#5	Kōtarō Hoshino	Pitcher	Komazawa University
#6	Haruto Fujiwara	Pitcher	Iizuka High School
#7	Jumpei Fujita	Pitcher	Tokushima Indigo Socks
#8	Keishin Nagamizu	Pitcher	Kyoto International High School

=== Hiroshima Toyo Carp ===
Pick	Player name	Position	Team
#1	Hayato Tsunehiro	Pitcher	Aoyama Gakuin University
#2	Taichi Taka	Pitcher	Osaka University of Commerce
#3	Kazuki Takita	Pitcher	Seisa Dohto University
#4	Yūto Nakata	Infielder	Okinawa Shogaku High School
#5	Kento Akatsuka	Pitcher	Chukyo Gakuin University
Developmental Player Draft
#1	Ken Sugita	Pitcher	Nihon University
#2	Keisuke Sato	Infielder	Shizuoka University
#3	Mirai Sugihara	Pitcher	Kyoto International High School

=== Chiba Lotte Marines ===
Pick	Player name	Position	Team
#1	Kyūto Ueda	Infielder	Meiji University
#2	Hikaru Ohtani	Pitcher	Toyama GRN Thunderbirds
#3	Yūto Kimura	Pitcher	Kasumigaura High School
#4	Oto Hayasaka	Pitcher	Makuhari Sogo High School
#5	Ryusei Terachi	Catcher	Meitoku Gijyuku High School
Developmental Player Draft
#1	Ryōta Takeuchi	Pitcher	Seiryo High School
#2	Shinya Matsuishi	Pitcher	Toin High School
#3	Hikaru Kōno	Outfielder	Toyama GRN Thunderbirds
#4	Kazuki Fujita	Outfielder	Nobeoka Gakuen High School
#5	Kōnoshin Toyama	Catcher	Aizu Hokurei High School

=== Hanshin Tigers ===
Pick	Player name	Position	Team
#1	Kaito Shimomura	Pitcher	Aoyama Gakuin University
#2	Tsuyoshi Shiiba	Pitcher	Tokushima indigo socks
#3	Shūya Yamada	Infielder	Sendai Ikuei High School
#4	Aoi Momosaki	Infielder	Tokai University Kumamoto Seisyo High School
#5	Yūya Ishiguro	Pitcher	West Japan Railway Company
#6	Junya Tsuda	Pitcher	Osaka University of Economics
Developmental Player Draft
#1	Kai Matsubara	Pitcher	Toyama GRN Thunderbirds
#2	Kein Fukushima	Outfielder	Hakuoh University

=== Orix Buffaloes ===
Pick	Player name	Position	Team
#1	Seiya Yokoyama	Infielder	Ueda Nishi High School
#2	Kōsuke Kawachi	Pitcher	St. Catherine Gakuen High School
#3	Kaisei Tōmatsu	Pitcher	Kyoei High School
#4	Shūna Hori	Catcher	Hotoku Gakuen High School
#5	Taito Takashima	Pitcher	Oji
#6	Seiryū Kotajima	Pitcher	Nippon Express
#7	Ryūsei Gonda	Pitcher	TDK
Developmental Player Draft
#1	Hiroto Suga	Pitcher	Eimei High School
#2	Kaito Ohe	Pitcher	Kitakyushu Shimonoseki Phoenix
#3	Riku Miyaguni	Pitcher	Toho High School
#4	Taketo Ashida	Pitcher	Saitama Musashi Heat Bears
#5	Sōta Kawano	Infielder	Ehime Mandarin Pirates

Preceded by 2022	Nippon Professional Baseball draft	Succeeded by 2024
