= Ryusei Terachi =

Japanese baseball catcher (born 2005)

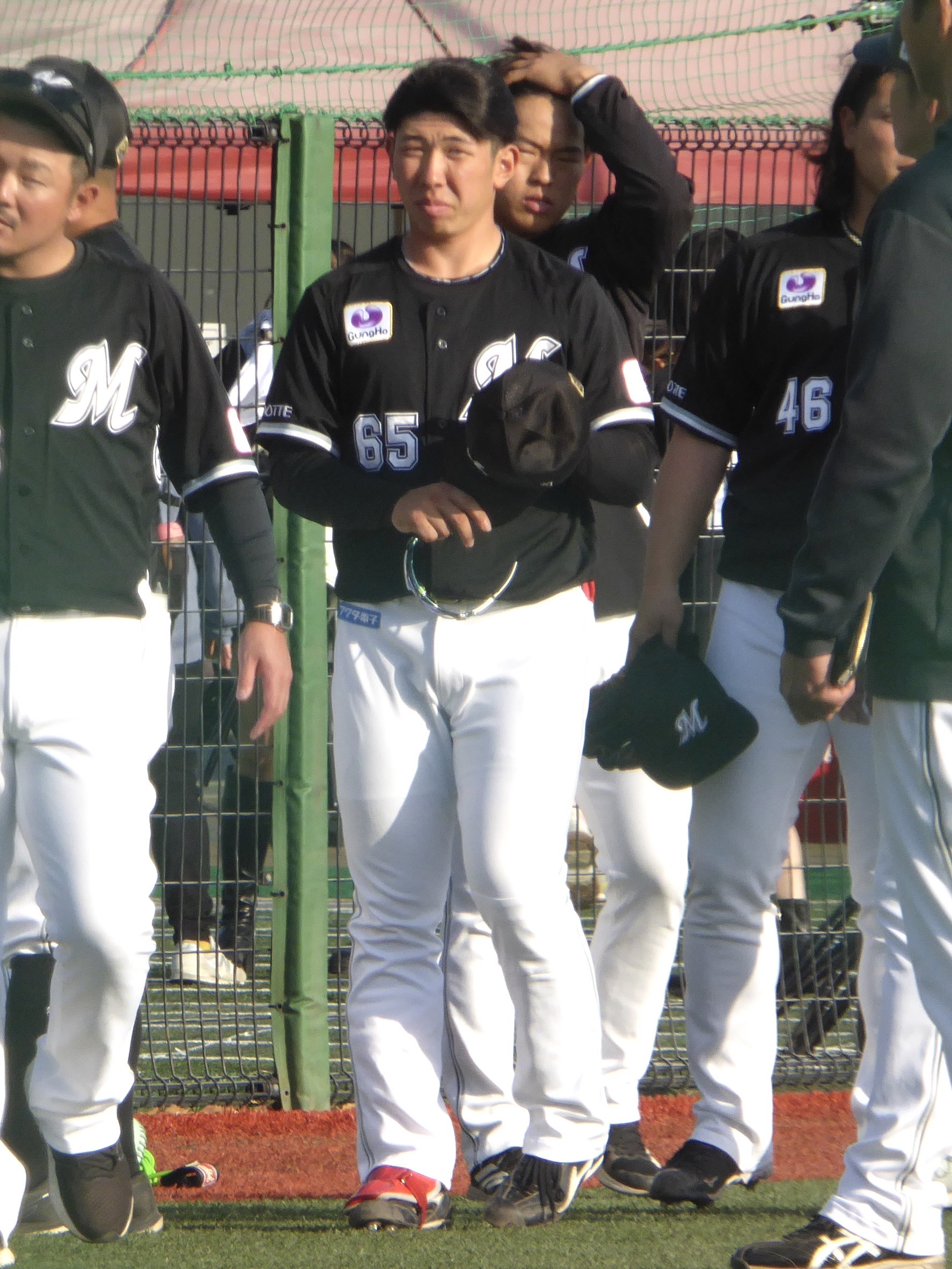
- Ryusei Terachi with the Chiba Lotte Marines

Chiba Lotte Marines – No. 65
- Catcher
- Born: August 19, 2005 (age 20); Sumida, Tokyo, Japan
- Bats: Left Throws: Right

NPB debut
- October 3, 2024, for the Chiba Lotte Marines

NPB statistics (through 2025 season)
- Batting average: .254
- Hits: 107
- Home runs: 5
- Runs batted in: 33

Teams
- Chiba Lotte Marines (2024-present)

Career highlights and awards
- NPB All-Star (2025)

Ryusei Terachi (寺地 隆成, Terachi Ryusei; born August 19, 2005) is a Japanese professional baseball catcher for the Chiba Lotte Marines of Nippon Professional Baseball (NPB).

== High school career ==
Terachi attended Meitoku Gijuku in Kōchi Prefecture. He started as a third baseman before transitioning to catcher towards the end of his second year. His best result with the school came as a second-year student in 2022, where the school made it to the second round of the Japanese High School Baseball Championship. In 2023, he represented Japan in the 2023 U-18 Baseball World Cup, where the team won their first title. As the starting first baseman, he hit .286/.412./393 across the tournament.

== Professional career ==
=== Chiba Lotte Marines ===
Terachi was drafted by the Chiba Lotte Marines in the 5th round of the 2023 Nippon Professional Baseball draft.

==== 2024 ====
Terachi made his NPB debut on October 3, 2024, recording his first career NPB hit, a double to left field against Hokkaido Nippon-Ham Fighters pitcher Kōta Tatsu. He appeared in one more game that year, the following day, where he failed to record a hit. In the offseason, he was one of five Marines prospects sent to play in the Australian Baseball League (ABL) for the Sydney Blue Sox between November and December, posting a .302/.397./365 slashline in 19 games.

==== 2025 ====
Terachi made his first start in 2025 on April 4. On April 18, he hit his first and second career NPB home runs against Tohoku Rakuten Golden Eagles pitcher Takahisa Hayakawa, becoming the first teenage catcher to hit 2 home runs in a game since Ginjiro Sumitani in 2006, and the first in franchise history to hit any home runs since Takeo Daigo in 1957. He received his first All-Star selection this year, and was a defensive substitute in Game 1. Terachi was the starting catcher in Game 2, where he hit an RBI double off of Yomiuri Giants pitcher Iori Yamasaki in the top of the 3rd inning.
