= List of current KBO League team rosters =

Below are the rosters of KBO League teams.

== SSG Landers ==
The landers hold the record for most female players at one time.

== See also ==
- List of Major League Baseball team rosters
- List of current Nippon Professional Baseball team rosters
