= Shō Kusaka =

Japanese baseball player (born 2001)

Shō Kusaka 草加 勝

Chunichi Dragons – No. 14
- Starting pitcher
- Born: November 21, 2001 (age 24); Wake, Okayama, Japan
- Bats: Right Throws: Right

debut
- October 1, 2025, for the Chunichi Dragons

Career statistics (through July 26, 2026)
- Win-Loss: 0-2
- Earned run average: 3.38
- Strikeouts: 17

Teams
- Chunichi Dragons (2024–present)

Shō Kusaka (草加 勝, Kusaka Shō; born November 21, 2001) is a professional Japanese baseball player. He plays pitcher for the Chunichi Dragons.

Kusaka was the first-round draft pick for the Chunichi Dragons in the 2023 Nippon Professional Baseball draft.

== Early career ==
Kusaka started playing baseball from year while at Wake Municipal Fujino Elementary School. At Wake Municipal Middle school, he played for a rubber-ball team.

He would enter Sōshi Gakuen Senior High School, and make the bench in his sophomore year. While his team would make it to the 100th anniversary Koshien tournament that year, Kusaka was unable to make an appearance. In summer of his senior year, his school would lose out to Kurashiki Commercial Senior High in the semi-finals of the Okayama Prefectural Tournament. Kusaka's fastest speed at this point was 146 km/h, but his teammate from the same grade, Junya Nishi, was the absolute ace. As a result, Kusaka never pitched in an official summer game during his three years in high school.

After graduating high school, Kusaka would enter Asia University. Until spring of his sophomore year, he had only one league appearance to his name, but in fall of his senior year he was given more opportunities to pitch where he posted a 0.29 ERA receiving a valuable player award. In July 2023, Kusaka was selected for the USA VS Japan Collegiate All-Star Series while in fall of the same year, he threw a personal best high velocity of 153km/h. On 28 September, he submitted his intention to turn pro with NPB.

On 26 October at the 2023 Nippon Professional Baseball draft, Kusaka was selected in the first round by the Chunichi Dragons and Chiba Lotte Marines after each team had missed out on Ryūki Watarai, with the Dragons prevailing in the lottery. On 14 November, he signed a ¥16,000,000 per year deal with a ¥100,000,000 sign-on bonus with ¥50,000,000 in incentives. On 14 December he was officially unveiled with the other 2023 draftees being presented with the 14 previously worn by former team aces Shinji Imanaka and Eiji Bandō.

== Professional career ==
On 16 January 2024, it was reported that Kusaka had a ulnar collateral ligament sprain preventing him from throwing. On 30 January, it was confirmed that Kusaka would undergo Tommy John surgery ruling him out of the 2024 season.

== Pitching Style ==
Kusaka throws a fastball that tops out at 153km/h. He also throws a two-seamer, curveball and slider having the most confidence in the former two.

== Personal ==
Kusaka, idolizes former Chunichi Dragons ace, manager and fellow Okayama native Senichi Hoshino for his fighting spirit, aspires to master a 'fireball fastball' akin to Kyuji Fujikawa, and expresses admiration for Yoshinobu Yamamoto from a neighboring city, aspiring to follow in his footsteps.
