= Ryōto Matsumoto =

Japanese baseball player (born 2001)

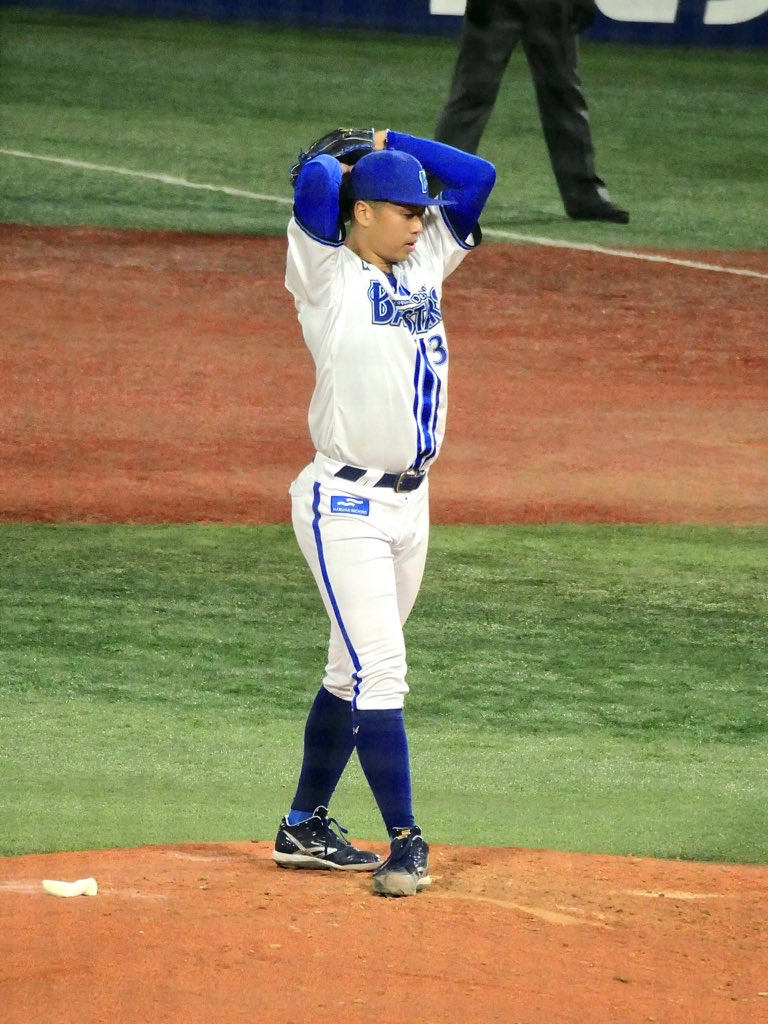

Yokohama DeNA BayStars – No. 38
- Pitcher
- Born: December 5, 2001 (age 24); Shijōnawate, Osaka, Japan
- Bats: Right Throws: Right

NPB debut
- April 3, 2024, for the Yokohama DeNA BayStars

Career statistics (through August 1, 2026)
- Win-Loss: 0–0
- ERA: 4.57
- Strikeouts: 14

Teams
- Yokohama DeNA BayStars (2024–Present)

Ryōto Matsumoto (松本 凌人, Matsumoto Ryōto; born December 5, 2001) is a professional Japanese baseball player. He pitches for the Yokohama DeNA BayStars of Nippon Professional Baseball (NPB).

Shinogi was selected in the 2nd round of the 2023 Nippon Professional Baseball draft.
