= Shunsuke Iwai =

Japanese baseball player (born 2001)

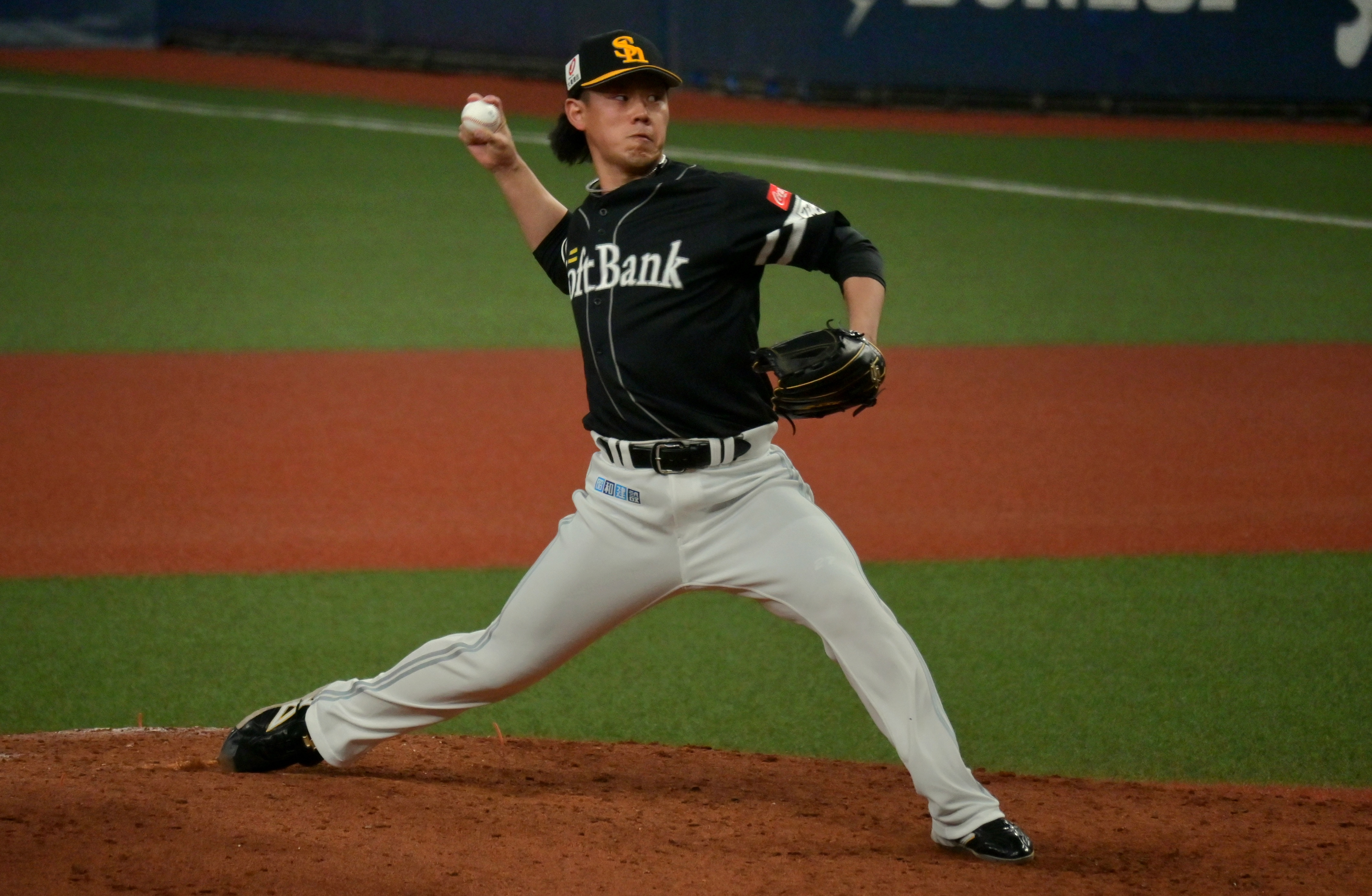
- Iwai with the Fukuoka SoftBank Hawks in 2025

Fukuoka SoftBank Hawks – No. 27
- Pitcher
- Born: July 31, 2001 (age 25); Takahama, Aichi, Japan
- Bats: Right Throws: Right

NPB debut
- April 4, 2024, for the Fukuoka SoftBank Hawks

Career statistics (through August 27, 2026)
- Win–loss record: 1–1
- Earned run average: 2.54
- Strikeouts: 21
- Saves: 1
- Holds: 3

Teams
- Fukuoka SoftBank Hawks (2024–present)

Career highlights and awards
- Japan Series champion (2025)

Shunsuke Iwai (岩井 俊介, Shunsuke Iwai; born July 31, 2001) is a Japanese professional baseball player. He is a pitcher for the Fukuoka SoftBank Hawks of Nippon Professional Baseball (NPB).

== Career ==
Iwai was selected by Fukuoka SoftBank Hawks in the second round of the 2023 NPB draft. He made his Nippon Professional Baseball (NPB) debut on April 4, 2024.
