= Shigeru Sugimura =

Japanese baseball player and coach (born 1957)

- Infielder / Coach
- Born: July 31, 1957; Sanuki, Kōchi, Japan
- Batted: Right Threw: Right

NPB debut
- April 6, 1977, for the Yakult Swallows

Last appearance
- July 20, 1987, for the Yakult Swallows

NPB statistics
- Batting average: .228
- Hits: 147
- Home runs: 49
- Runs batted in: 46
- Stolen base: 1

Teams
- As player: Yakult Swallows (1976–1987); As coach: Yakult Swallows/Tokyo Yakult Swallows (2000–2007, 2013–2025); Yokohama BayStars (2008–2011)
- Last updated on: January 1 2026

Shigeru Sugimura (杉村 繁, Sugimura Shigeru; born July 31, 1957) is a Japanese former Nippon Professional Baseball infielder.
