= Kento Inoue =

Japanese baseball player (born 2000)

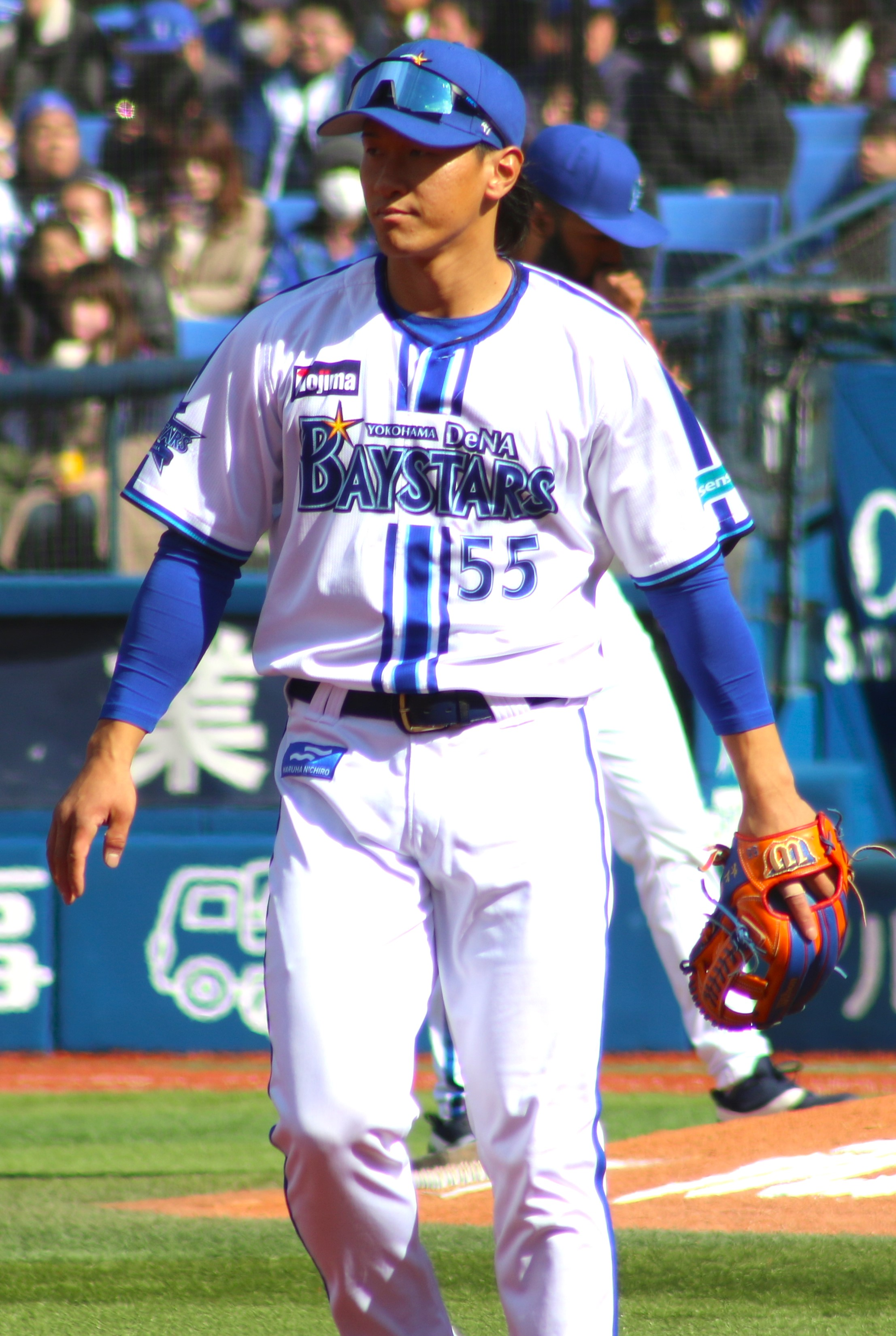
- Inoue with the Yokohama DeNA BayStars

Yokohama DeNA BayStars – No. 55
- Outfielder
- Born: February 23, 2000 (age 26); Chikushino, Fukuoka, Japan
- Bats: Left Throws: Right

NPB debut
- April 12, 2024, for the Yokohama DeNA BayStars

Career statistics (through 2025 season)
- Batting average: .183
- Hits: 13
- Home runs: 2
- RBI: 11

Teams
- Tokushima Indigo Socks (2022–2023); Yokohama DeNA BayStars (2024–present)

Career highlights and awards
- Japan Series champion (2024)

Kento Inoue (井上絢登, Inoue Ayato; born February 23, 2000) is a Japanese professional baseball player. He is an outfielder for the Yokohama DeNA BayStars of Nippon Professional Baseball (NPB).

== Career ==
=== Tokushima Indigo Socks ===
In the 2023 Shikoku Island League Plus season, Inoue had 14 homers, 39 hits and 14 stolen bases. He was named the MVP of the season. In 2022 and 2023, Inoue led the league in home runs and RBI.

=== Yokohama DeNA BayStars ===
Inoue was selected by Yokohama DeNA BayStars in the sixth round of the 2023 NPB draft. He made his Nippon Professional Baseball (NPB) debut on April 12, 2024. In 48 appearances, Inoue batted .191/.261/.310 with 4 RBI and one stolen base. With Yokohama, he won the 2024 Japan Series.

In 2025, Inoue made 31 appearances and batted .172/.194/.379 with two home runs and 7 RBI.
