= Kyō Suzuki =

Japanese baseball player (born 2006)

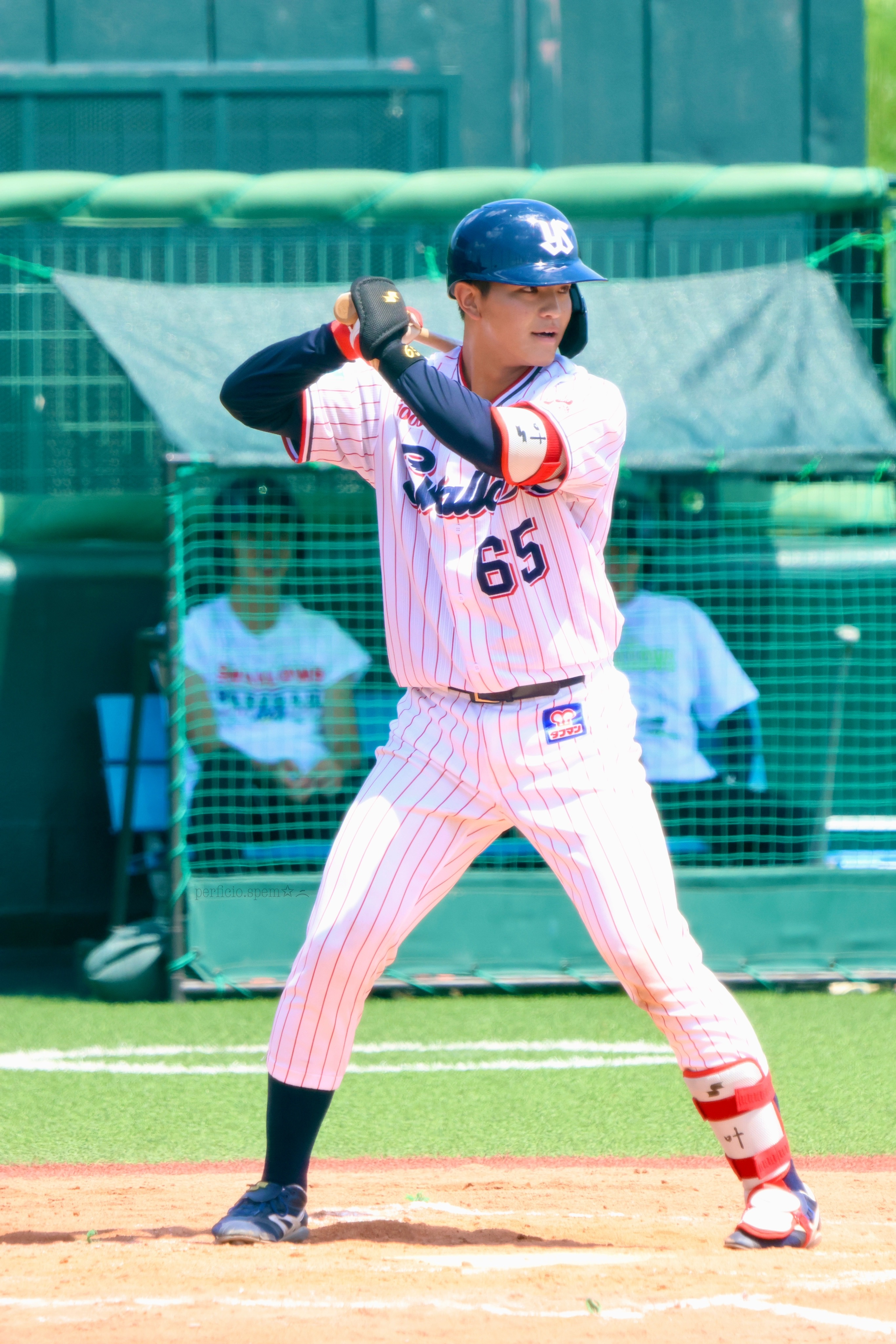

Tokyo Yakult Swallows – No. 65
- Catcher
- Born: March 21, 2006 (age 20); Kakegawa, Shizuoka, Japan
- Bats: Right Throws: Right

NPB debut
- June 12, 2024, for the Tokyo Yakult Swallows

Career statistics (through 2025 season)
- Batting average: .400
- Hits: 4
- Home runs: 0
- RBI: 3
- Stats at Baseball Reference

Teams
- Tokyo Yakult Swallows (2024–present)

Kyō Suzuki (鈴木 叶, Suzuki Kyō; born March 21, 2006) is a Japanese professional baseball catcher for the Tokyo Yakult Swallows of Nippon Professional Baseball (NPB).
