= Shintaro Yoshida =

Japanese baseball player

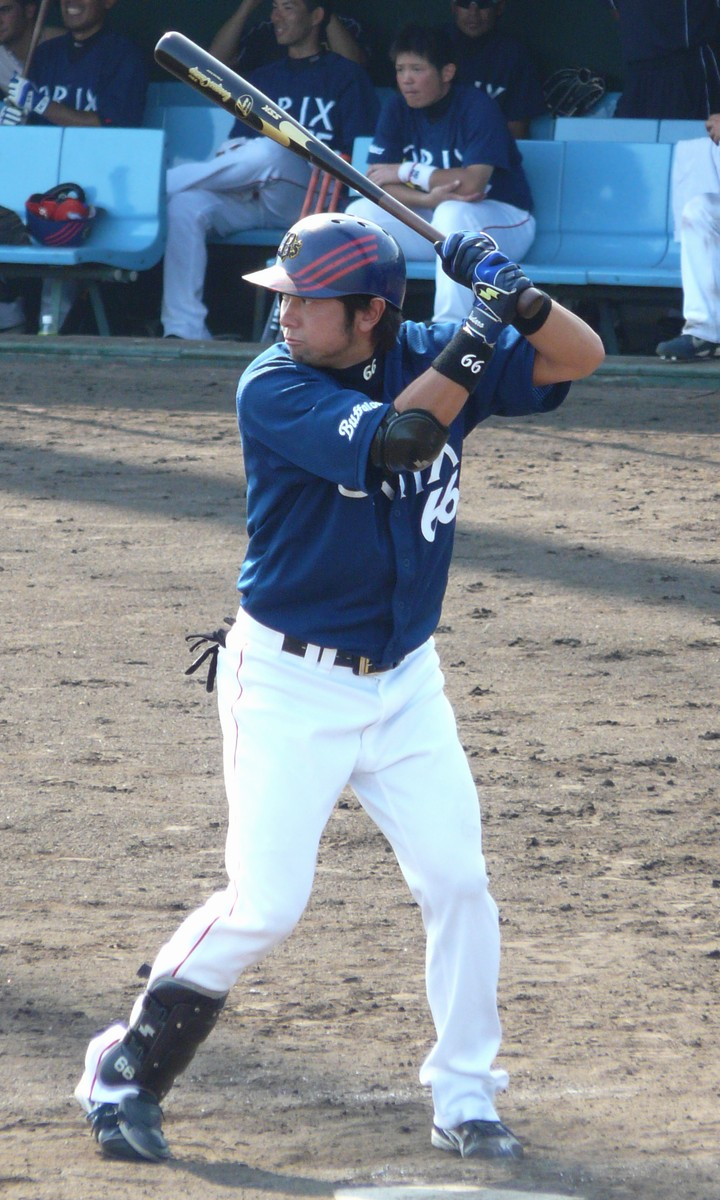

Orix Buffaloes – No. 86
- Outfielder / Coach
- Born: July 20, 1981 (age 45); Kanazawa, Ishikawa
- Bats: Left Throws: Left

NPB debut
- 2004, for the Orix BlueWave

NPB statistics (through 2011)
- Batting average: .182
- Home runs: 2
- Runs batted in: 9
- Stats at Baseball Reference

Teams
- As player: Orix BlueWave/Orix Buffaloes (2004–2012); As coach: Orix Buffaloes (2020–present)

Shintaro Yoshida (由田 慎太郎, Yoshida Shintarō; born July 20, 1981) is a Japanese professional baseball outfielder for the Orix Buffaloes in Japan's Nippon Professional Baseball.
