= Yūhi Nishidate =

Japanese baseball player (born 2002)

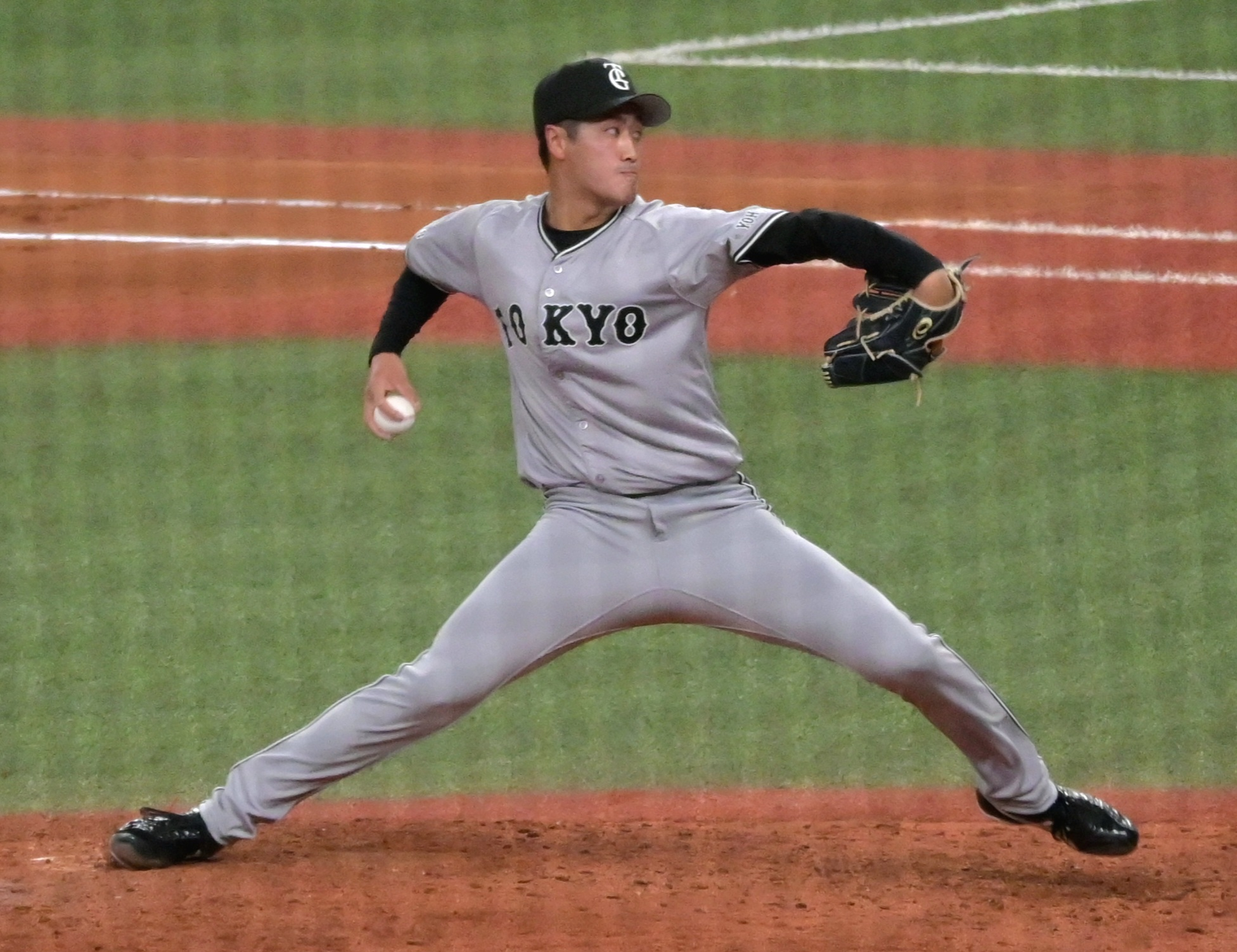
- Nishidate with the Yomiuri Giants

Yomiuri Giants – No. 17
- Pitcher
- Born: March 11, 2002 (age 23); Ninohe District, Iwate, Japan
- Bats: Right Throws: Right

NPB debut
- March 29, 2024, for the Yomiuri Giants

Career statistics (through 2024 season)
- Win–loss record: 1-3
- Earned Run Average: 3.82
- Strikeouts: 25
- Saves: 1
- Holds: 20

Teams
- Yomiuri Giants (2024–present)

Yūhi Nishidate (西舘 勇陽, Nishidate Yūhi; born March 11, 2002 in Ninohe, Iwate, Japan) is a professional Japanese baseball player. He plays pitcher for the Yomiuri Giants.
