= Shunsuke Sasaki =

Japanese baseball player (born 1999)

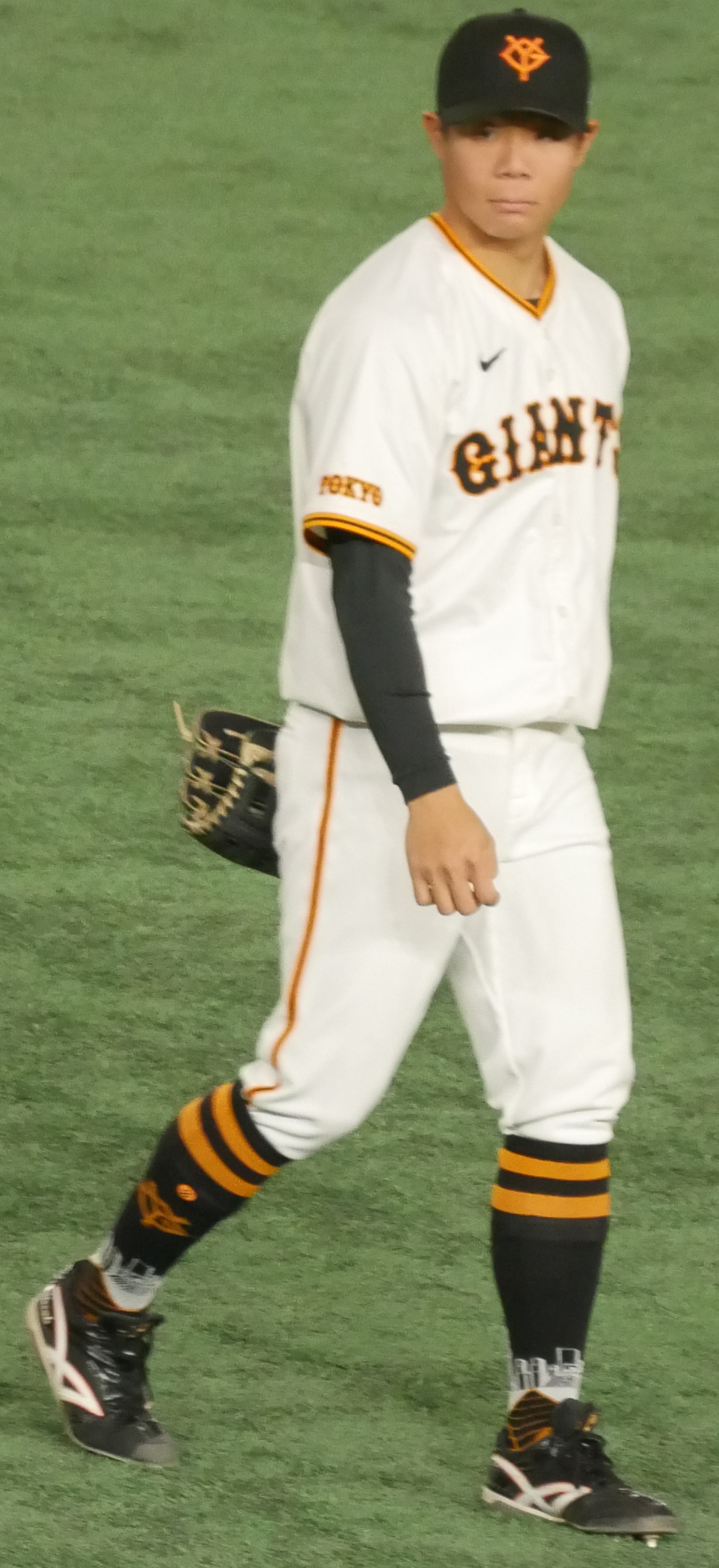

Yomiuri Giants – No. 44
- Outfielder
- Born: November 6, 1999 (age 26); Hino, Tokyo, Japan
- Bats: Left Throws: Right

NPB debut
- March 29, 2024, for the Yomiuri Giants

NPB statistics (through 2025 season)
- Batting average: .239
- Home runs: 0
- RBI: 16
- Hits: 68
- Stolen base: 3
- Sacrifice bunt: 13

Teams
- Yomiuri Giants (2024–present)

Shunsuke Sasaki (佐々木 俊輔, Sasaki Shunsuke; born November 6, 1999 in Hino, Tokyo, Japan) is a professional Japanese baseball player. He plays outfielder for the Yomiuri Giants.
