= Teppei Mataki =

Japanese baseball player (born 1999)

Yomiuri Giants – No. 46
- Pitcher
- Born: February 12, 1999 (age 27); Fuefuki, Yamanashi, Japan
- Bats: Left Throws: Left

NPB debut
- June 1, 2024, for the Yomiuri Giants

Career statistics (through 2026 season)
- Win–loss record: 1-3
- Earned Run Average: 5.12
- Strikeouts: 24
- Saves: 0
- Holds: 0

Teams
- Yomiuri Giants (2024–present)

Teppei Mataki (又木 鉄平, Mataki Teppei; born February 12, 1999 in Fuefuki, Yamanashi, Japan) is a professional Japanese baseball player. He plays pitcher for the Yomiuri Giants.
