= Yugo Maeda =

Japanese baseball player (born 2005)

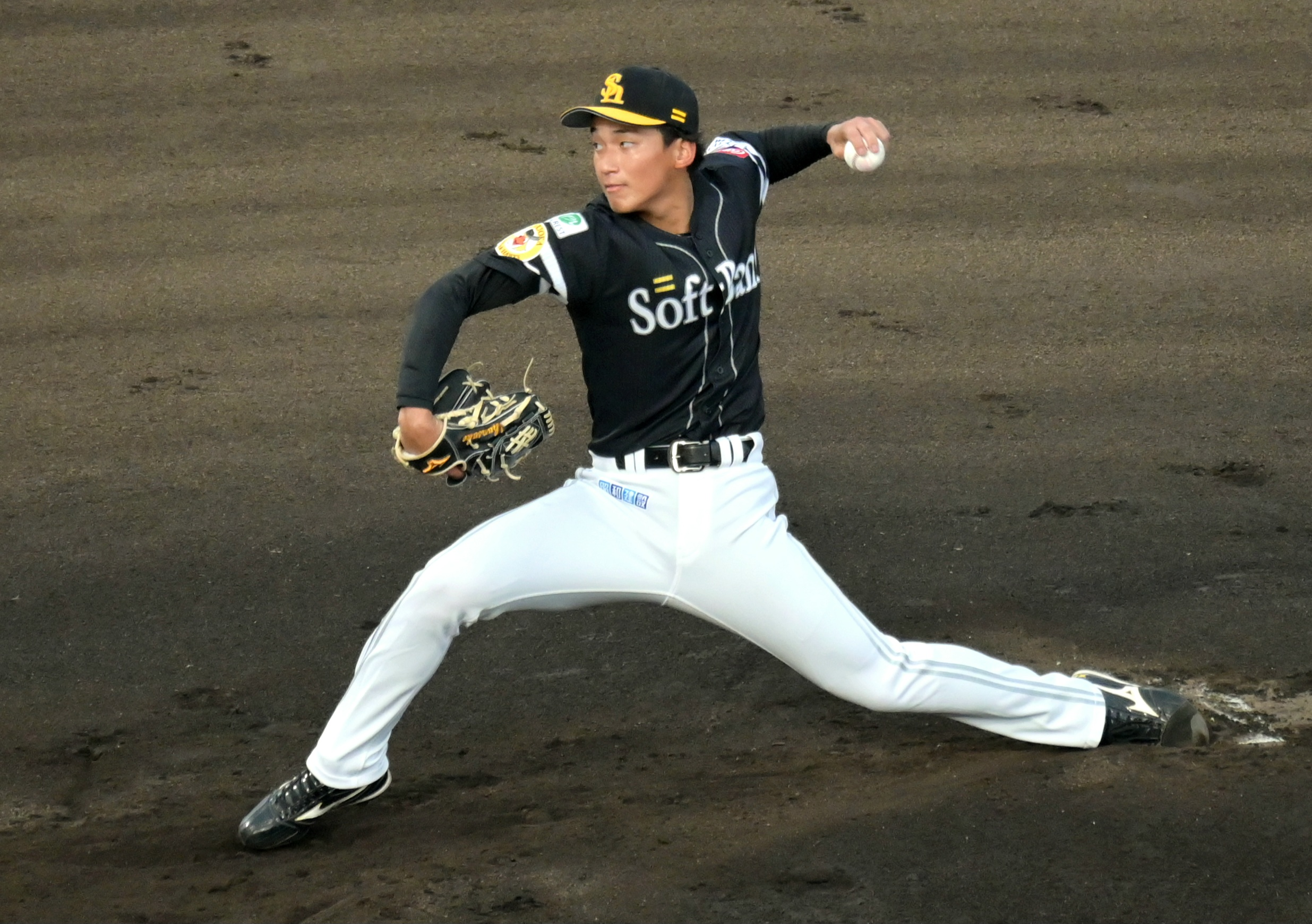

Fukuoka SoftBank Hawks – No. 41
- Pitcher
- Born: August 4, 2005 (age 21); Shiga, Shiga, Japan
- Bats: Left Throws: Left

NPB debut
- October 1, 2024, for the Fukuoka SoftBank Hawks

Career statistics (through 2025 season)
- Win–loss record: 1-1
- Earned run average: 6.91
- Strikeouts: 12
- Saves: 0
- Holds: 0

Teams
- Fukuoka SoftBank Hawks (2024–present)

Yugo Maeda (前田 悠伍, Maeda Yugo; born August 4, 2005) is a Japanese professional baseball pitcher for the Fukuoka SoftBank Hawks of Nippon Professional Baseball (NPB).
