= Haruki Hosono =

Japanese baseball player (born 2002)

Haruki Hosono 細野 晴希
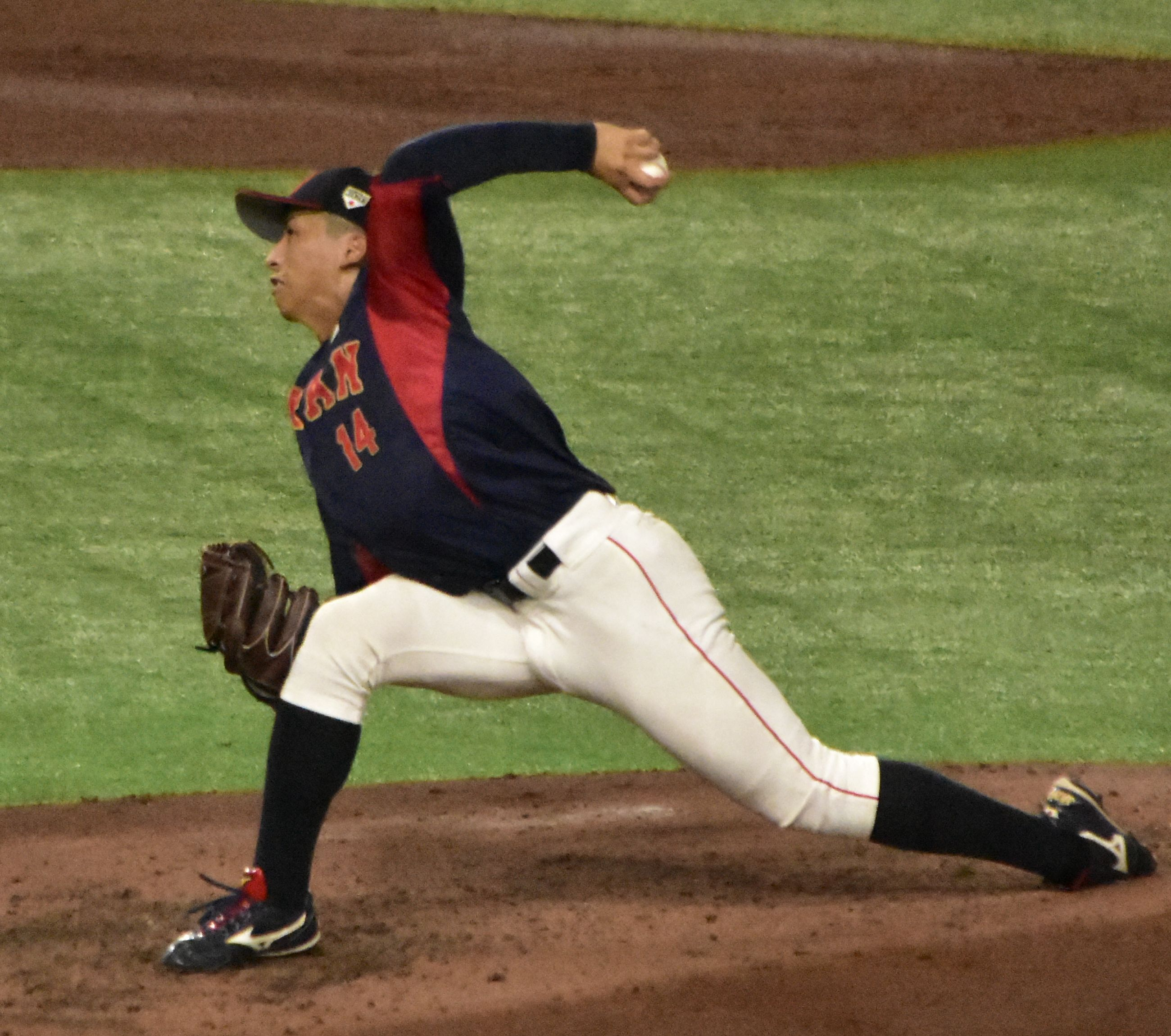

Hokkaido Nippon-Ham Fighters – No. 29
- Pitcher
- Born: February 26, 2002 (age 24); Hachiōji, Tokyo, Japan
- Bats: Left Throws: Left

NPB debut
- June 18, 2024, for the Hokkaido Nippon-Ham Fighters

Career statistics (through 2025 season)
- Win–loss record: 3-1
- Earned Run Average: 2.00
- Strikeouts: 43
- Saves: 0
- Holds: 0
- Stats at Baseball Reference

Teams
- Hokkaido Nippon-Ham Fighters (2024–present)

Career highlights and awards
- Pitched a no-hitter on March 31, 2026

Haruki Hosono (細野 晴希, Hosono Haruki; born February 26, 2002 in Hachiōji, Tokyo, Japan) is a Japanese professional baseball pitcher for the Hokkaido Nippon-Ham Fighters of Nippon Professional Baseball (NPB).
