= Taiga Ueda =

Japanese baseball player (born 2001)

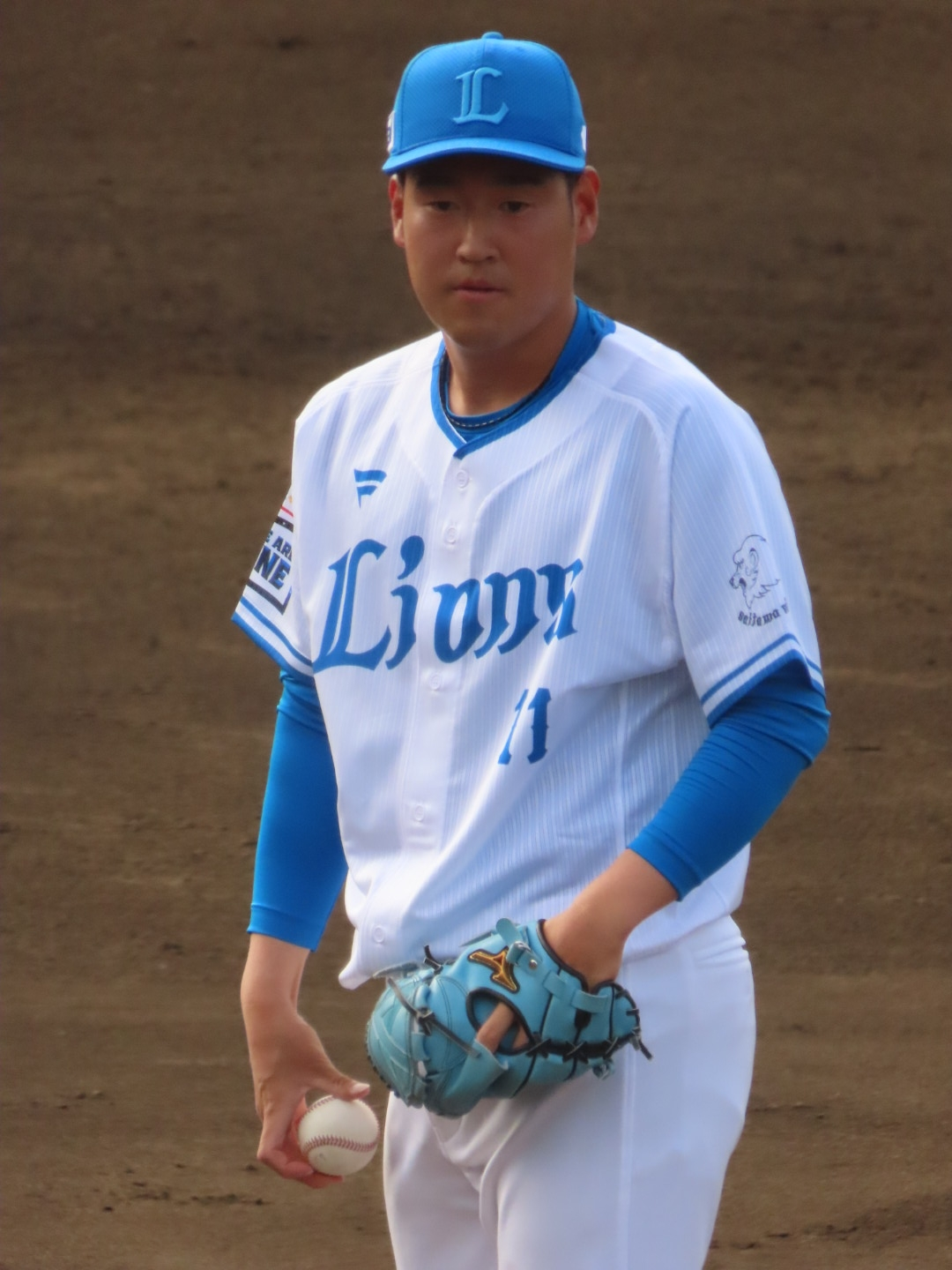

Saitama Seibu Lions – No. 11
- Pitcher
- Born: November 15, 2001 (age 24); Owase, Mie, Japan
- Bats: Right Throws: Right

NPB debut
- June 5, 2024, for the Saitama Seibu Lions

Career statistics (through 2025 season)
- Win–loss record: 0-2
- Earned run average: 4.57
- Strikeouts: 17
- Saves: 0
- Holds: 1

Teams
- Saitama Seibu Lions (2024–present)

Taiga Ueda (上田 大河, Ueda Taiga; born November 15, 2001) is a Japanese professional baseball pitcher for the Saitama Seibu Lions of Nippon Professional Baseball (NPB).
