= Kōta Tatsu =

Japanese baseball player (born 2004)

Kōta Tatsu 達 孝太
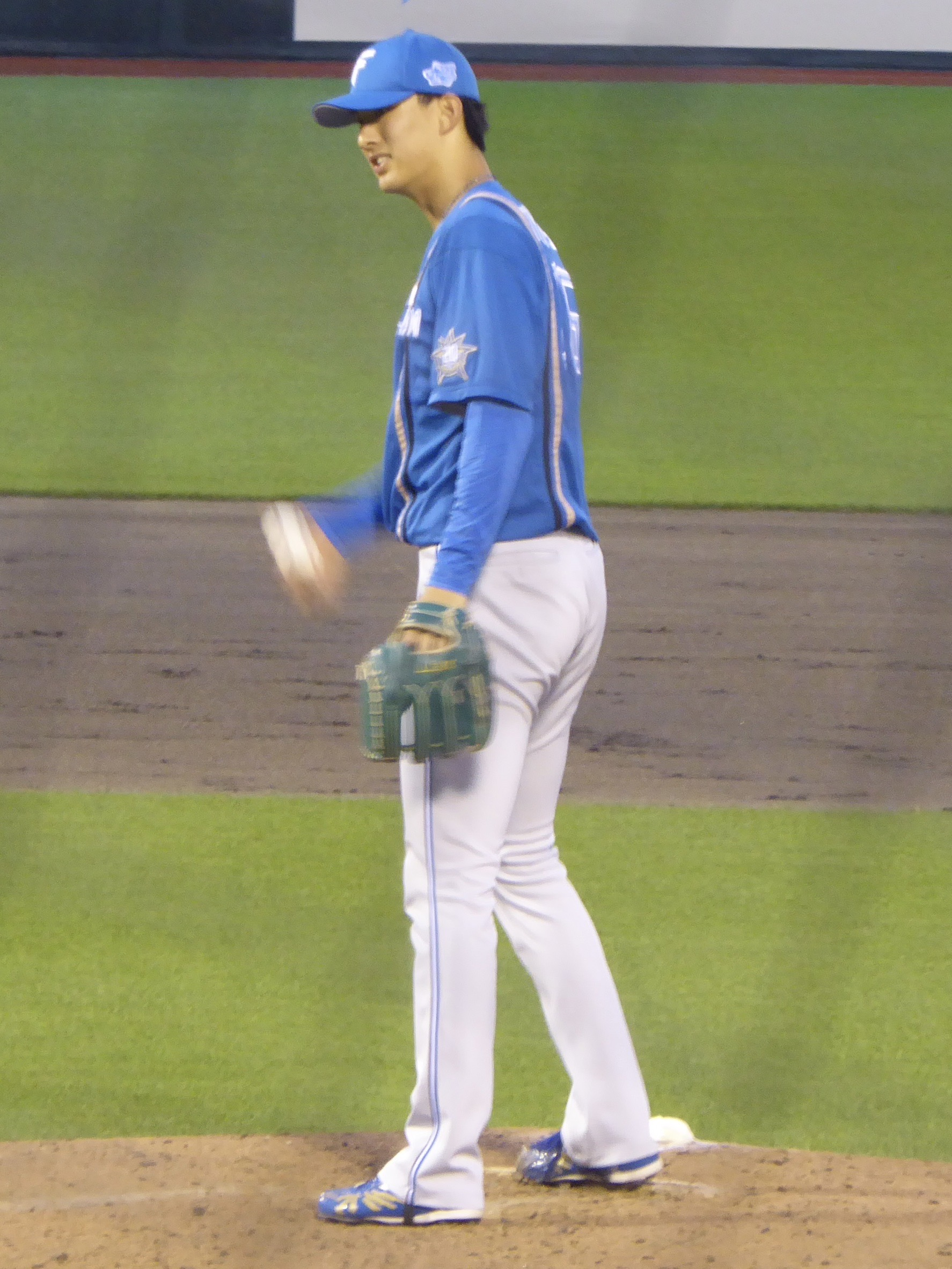

Hokkaido Nippon-Ham Fighters – No. 16
- Pitcher
- Born: March 27, 2004 (age 21); Sakai, Osaka, Japan
- Bats: Right Throws: Right

NPB debut
- September 25, 2022, for the Hokkaido Nippon-Ham Fighters

NPB statistics (through 2025 season)
- Win–loss record: 9–2
- Earned Run Average: 1.95
- Strikeouts: 98

Teams
- Hokkaido Nippon-Ham Fighters (2022–present)

Career highlights and awards
- NPB All-Star (2025)

Kōta Tatsu (達 孝太, Tatsu Kōta; born March 27, 2004) is a Japanese professional baseball pitcher for the Hokkaido Nippon-Ham Fighters of Nippon Professional Baseball (NPB).
