= Yūta Izuguchi =

Japanese baseball player (born 1999)

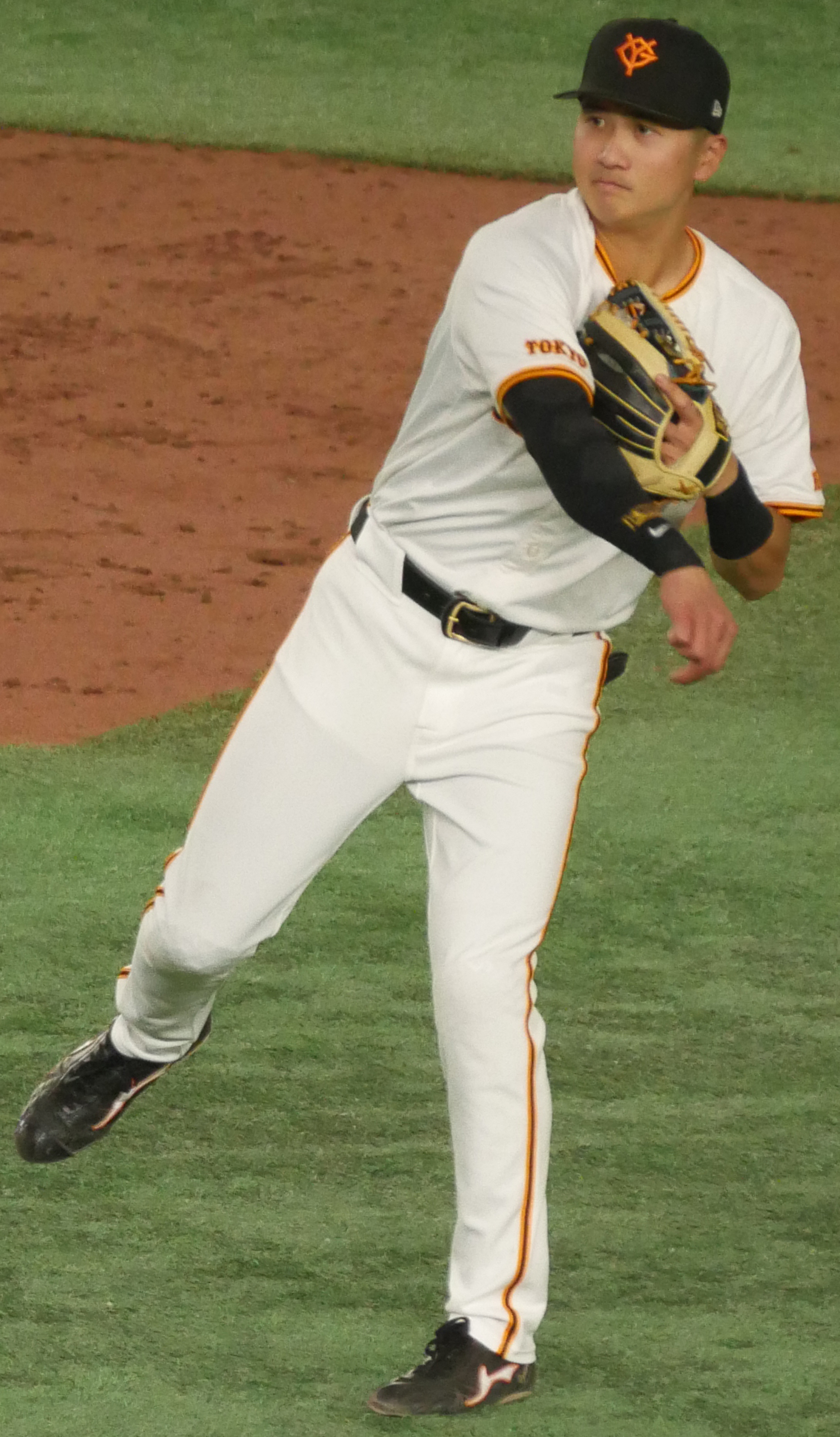

Yomiuri Giants – No. 35
- Infielder
- Born: May 17, 1999 (age 27); Gobō, Wakayama, Japan
- Bats: Left Throws: Right

NPB debut
- March 29, 2024, for the Yomiuri Giants

NPB statistics (through August 1, 2026)
- Batting average: .269
- Home runs: 13
- Run batted in: 77

Teams
- Yomiuri Giants (2024–present)

Career highlights and awards
- 1× NPB All-Star (2025); 1× Central League Best Nine Award (2025); 1× Central League Mitsui Golden Glove Award (2025)

Yūta Izuguchi (泉口 友汰, Izuguchi Yūta; born May 17, 1999 in Gobō, Wakayama, Japan) is a Japanese professional baseball infielder for the Yomiuri Giants of Nippon Professional Baseball (NPB).
