= Iori Yamasaki =

Japanese baseball player (born 1998)

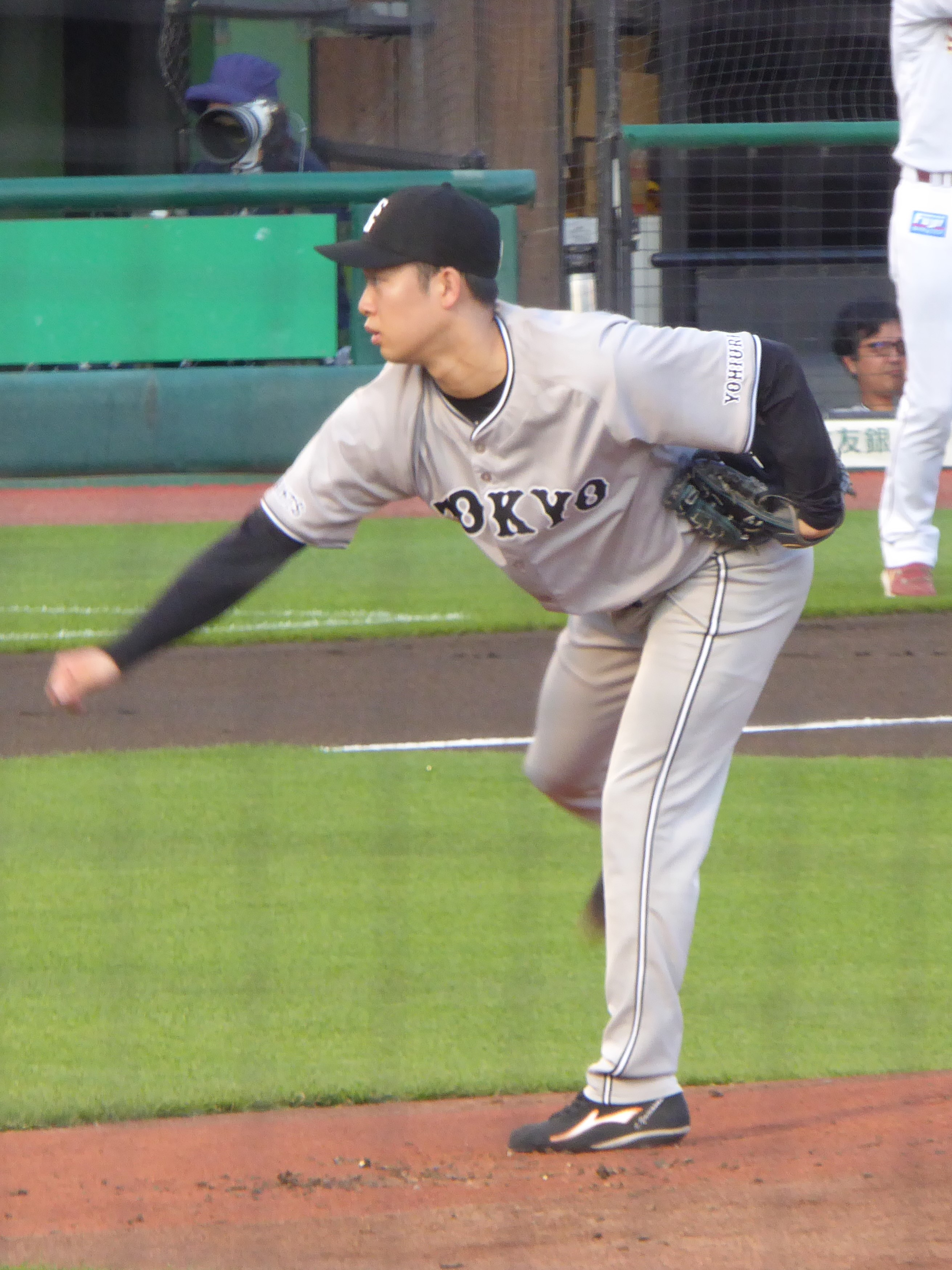

Yomiuri Giants – No. 19
- Pitcher
- Born: October 10, 1998 (age 27); Kobe, Hyōgo, Japan
- Bats: Left Throws: Right

NPB debut
- March 26, 2022, for the Yomiuri Giants

NPB statistics (through 2025 season)
- Win–loss record: 36–20
- Earned run average: 2.63
- Strikeouts: 395
- Stats at Baseball Reference

Teams
- Yomiuri Giants (2022–present)

Career highlights and awards
- 2x NPB All-Star (2024, 2025)

Iori Yamasaki (山﨑伊織, Yamasaki Iori; born October 10, 1998) is a Japanese professional baseball pitcher for the Yomiuri Giants of Nippon Professional Baseball (NPB).
