= Natsuki Takeuchi =

Japanese baseball player (born 2001)

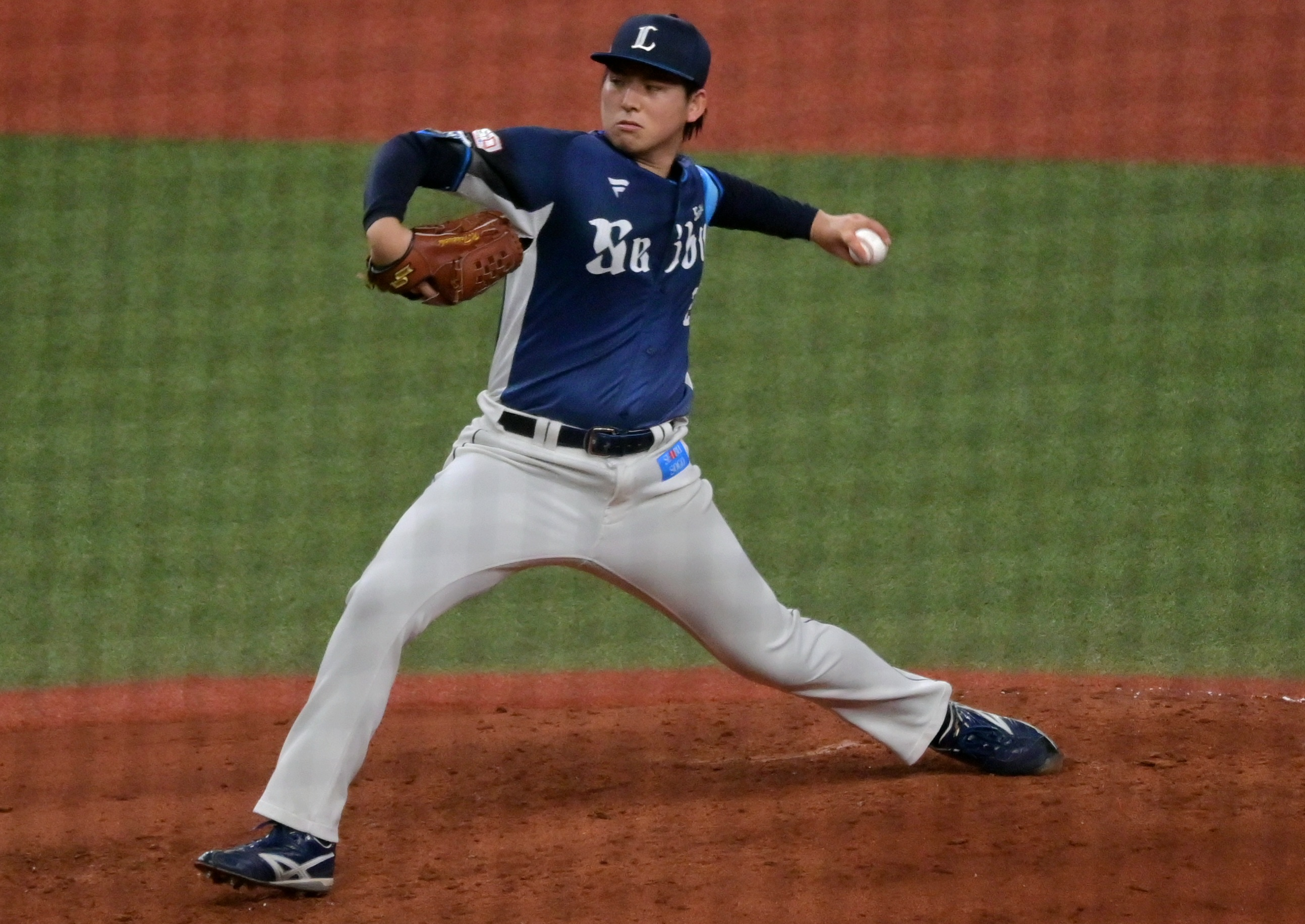
- Takeuchi pitching against the Orix Buffaloes on April 24, 2024

Saitama Seibu Lions – No. 21
- Pitcher
- Born: July 21, 2001 (age 24); Kitakyushu, Fukuoka, Japan
- Bats: Left Throws: Left

NPB debut
- April 3, 2025, for the Saitama Seibu Lions

Career statistics (through 2024 season)
- Win–loss record: 14–11
- Earned Run Average: 3.11
- Strikeouts: 153

Teams
- Saitama Seibu Lions (2024–present)

Career highlights and awards
- Pacific League Rookie of the Year (2024)

Natsuki Takeuchi (武内 夏暉, Takeuchi Natsuki; born July 21, 2001) is a Japanese professional baseball pitcher for the Saitama Seibu Lions of Nippon Professional Baseball (NPB).

== Career ==
In 2024, Takeuchi made 21 appearances for Seibu, compiling a 10–6 record and 2.17 ERA with 107 strikeouts across 145 1/3 innings pitched. Following the season, Takeuchi was named the Pacific League Rookie of the Year.
