= Kyuto Ueda =

Japanese baseball player (born 2001)

Kyūto Ueda
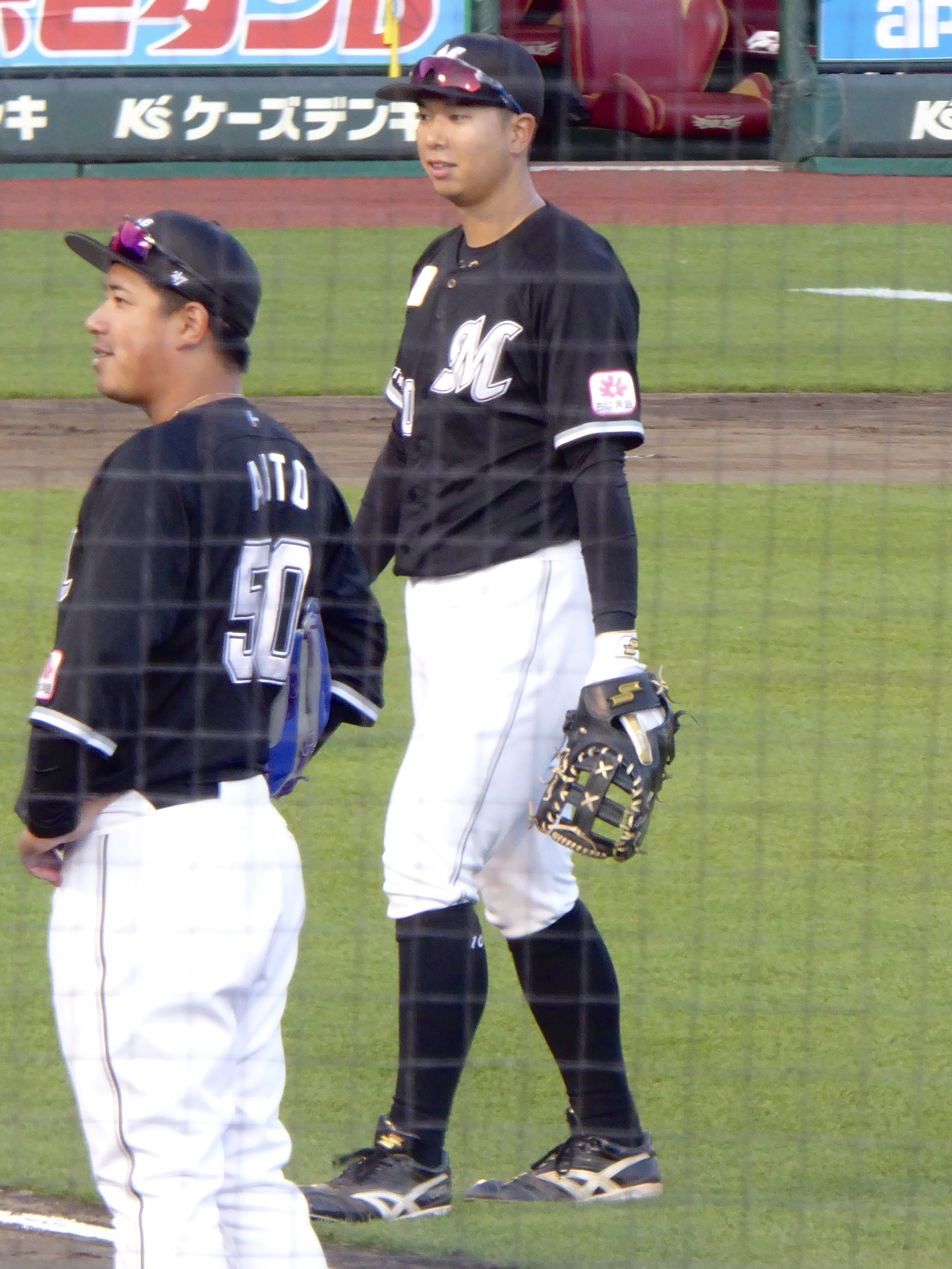

Chiba Lotte Marines – No. 10
- Infielder
- Born: August 12, 2001 (age 24); Okazaki, Aichi, Japan
- Bats: Left Throws: Right

debut
- April 3, 2024, for the Chiba Lotte Marines

Teams
- Chiba Lotte Marines (2024–present)

Kyūto Ueda (上田 希由翔, Ueda Kyūto; born August 12, 2001 in Okazaki, Aichi Prefecture) is a professional Japanese baseball player. He plays infielder for the Chiba Lotte Marines.
