= Ryūki Watarai =

Japanese baseball player (born 2002)

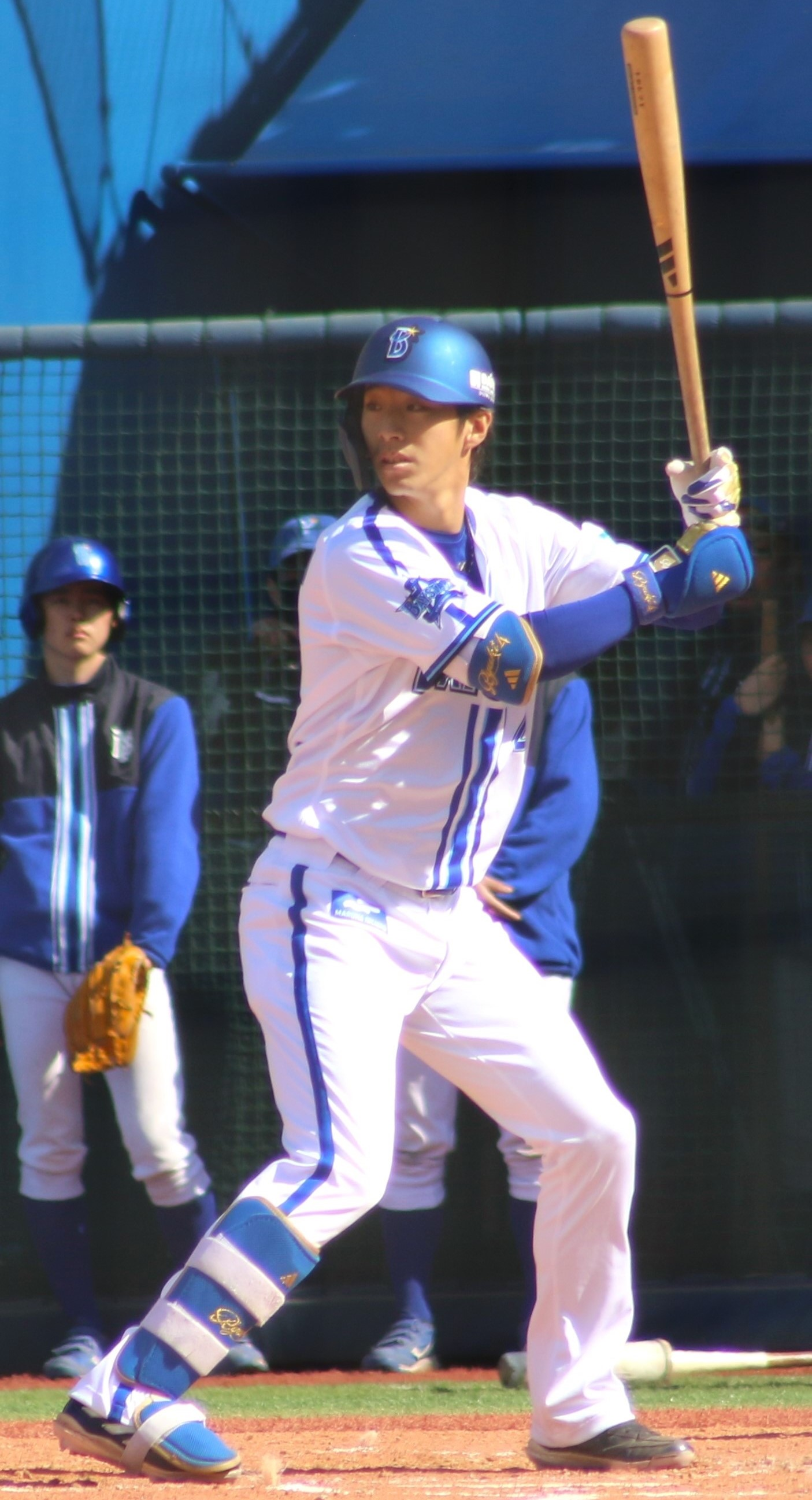
- Watarai with the Yokohama DeNA BayStars

Yokohama DeNA BayStars – No. 4
- Outfielder
- Born: October 4, 2002 (age 23); Ichikawa, Chiba, Japan
- Bats: Left Throws: Right

NPB debut
- March 29, 2024, for the Yokohama DeNA BayStars

NPB statistics (through August 1, 2026)
- Batting average: .258
- Home runs: 15
- RBI: 77
- Stats at Baseball Reference

Teams
- Yokohama DeNA BayStars (2024–present)

Career highlights and awards
- NPB All-Star (2024)

Ryūki Watarai (度会 隆輝, Watarai Ryūki; born October 4, 2002) is a Japanese professional baseball outfielder for the Yokohama DeNA BayStars of Nippon Professional Baseball (NPB).

== Personal life ==
His father is Hirobumi Watarai, a former professional baseball player for the Tokyo Yakult Swallows.
