= 2020 Nippon Professional Baseball draft =

2020 Nippon Professional Baseball Draft
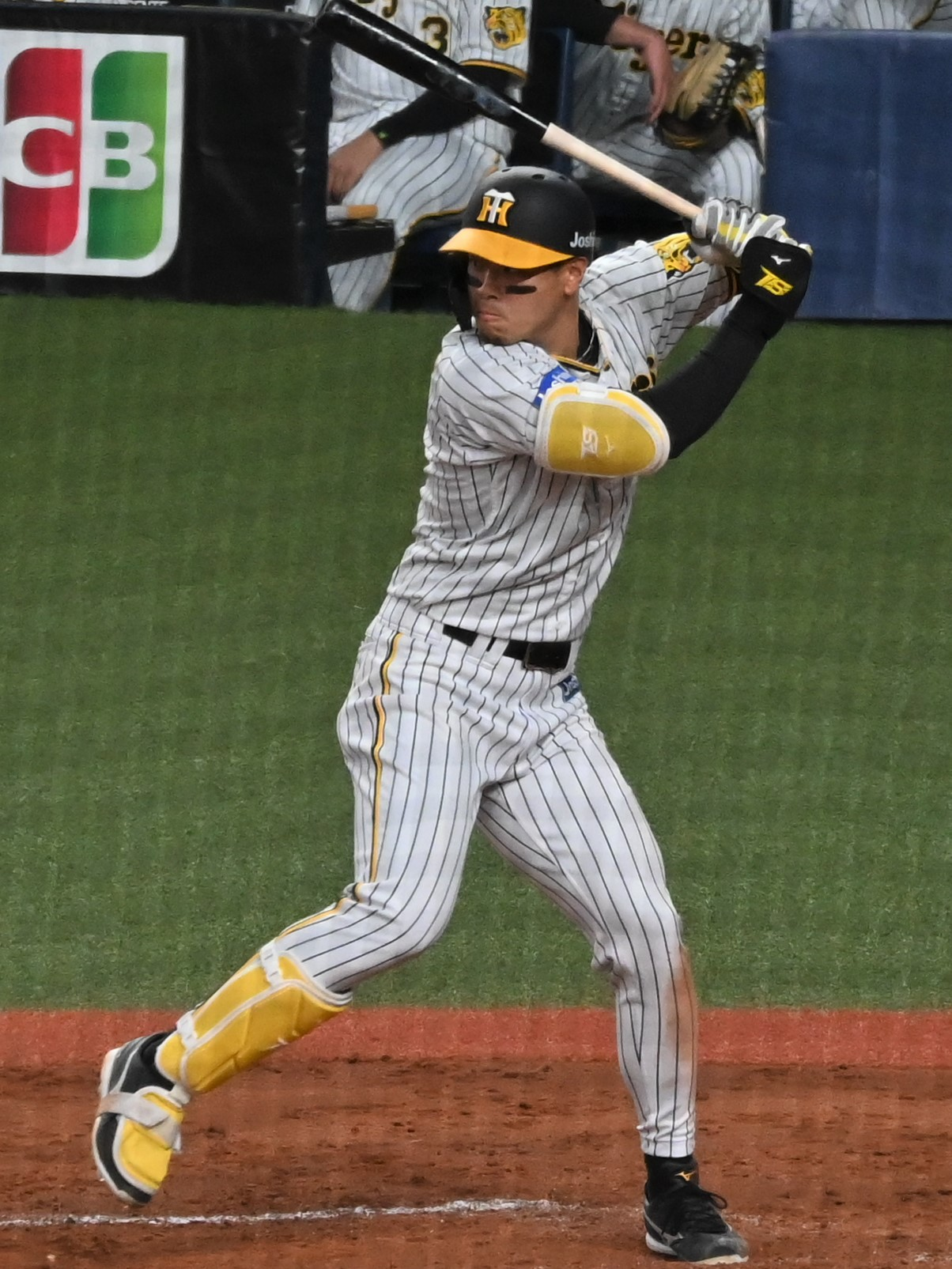
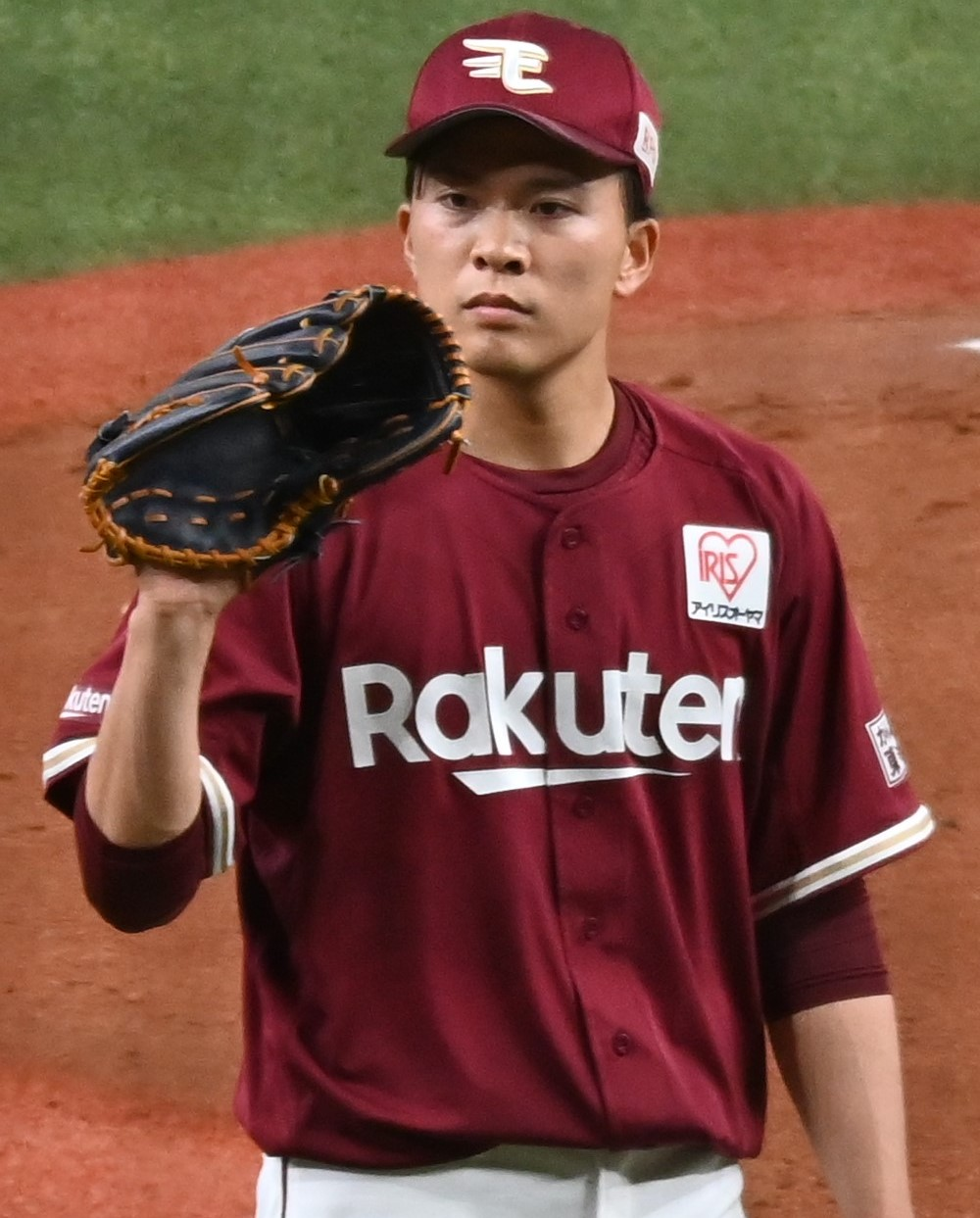
- Teruaki Sato and Takahisa Hayakawa, who was nominated and a bid lottery for by four teams.

General information
- Sport: Baseball
- Date: October 26, 2020
- Location: Grand Prince Hotel Takanawa, Tokyo
- Networks: TBS (first round), sky-A
- Sponsored by: Taisho Pharmaceutical

Overview
- 123 total selections in 14 (Includes draft for developmental players) rounds
- League: Nippon Professional Baseball
- First round selections: Teruaki Sato; Takahisa Hayakawa

The 2020 Nippon Professional Baseball (NPB) Draft was held on October 26, 2020, for the 56th time at the Grand Prince Hotel Takanawa to assign amateur baseball players to the NPB. It was arranged with the special cooperation of Taisho Pharmaceutical with official naming rights. The draft was officially called "The Professional Baseball Draft Meeting supported by Lipovitan D ". It has been sponsored by Taisho Pharmaceutical for the 8th consecutive year since 2013.

== Summary ==
Only the first round picks will be done by bid lottery. From 2019, the Professional Baseball Executive Committee has decided that the Central League and the Pacific League will be given the second round of waiver priority alternately every other year, and in 2020 Pacific League received the waiver priority. And since it was held in the middle of the regular season, the second round of Waiver priority was decided according to the ranking as of October 25, the day before. From the third round the order was reversed continuing in the same fashion until all picks were exhausted.

== First Round Contested Picks ==
	Player name	Position	Teams selected by
First Round	**Teruaki Sato**	Infielder	Buffaloes, **Tigers**, Hawks, Giants
First Round	**Takahisa Hayakawa**	Pitcher	Swallows, **Eagles**, Lions, Marines
Second Round	**Shota Suzuki**	Pitcher	Lions, **Marines**

- **Bolded** teams indicate who won the right to negotiate contract following a lottery.
- In the first round, **Hiromi Itoh** (Pitcher) was selected by the **Fighters**, **Ryoji Kuribayashi** (Pitcher) by the **Carp**, **Taisei Irie** (Pitcher) by the **BayStars**, and **Hiroto Takahashi** (Pitcher) by the **Dragons** without a bid lottery.
- In the second round, **Shunpeita Yamashita** (Pitcher) was selected by the **Buffaloes**, **Kento Watanabe** (Infielder) by the **Lions**, **Tomoya Inoue** (Infielder) by the **Hawks**, and **Ryuta Heinai** (Pitcher) by the **Giants** without a bid lottery.
- In the thrird round, the last remaining the **Swallows**, selected **Naofumi Kizawa** (Pitcher)
- List of selected players.

== Selected Players ==
Key
*	Player did not sign

- The order of the teams is the order of second round waiver priority.
- **Bolded** After that, a developmental player who contracted as a registered player under control.
- List of selected players.

=== Orix Buffaloes ===
Pick	Player name	Position	Team
#1	Shunpeita Yamashita	Pitcher	Fukuoka University Ohori High School
#2	Kendai Gen	Outfielder	Chukyo University Chukyo High School
#3	Ryoto Kita	Outfielder	Akashi Commercial High School
#4	Hayate Nakagawa	Pitcher	Rikkyo University
#5	Takuma Nakagawa	Catcher	Toyohashi Chuo High School
#6	Shota Abe	Pitcher	Nippon Life
Developmental Player Draft
#1	Kento Kawase	Pitcher	Oita Commercial High School
#2	Takara Tsujigaki	Pitcher	Matsurin Gakuen Fukushima High School
#3	**Yuki Udagawa**	Pitcher	Sendai University
#4	Jui Tsuri	Catcher	Kyoto International High School
#5	**Yukikazu Sano**	Outfielder	Sendai University
#6	Taku Kocho	Infielder	Fukushima RedHopes

=== Tokyo Yakult Swallows ===
Pick	Player name	Position	Team
#1	Naofumi Kizawa	Pitcher	Keio University
#2	Taichi Yamano	Pitcher	Tohoku Fukushi University
#3	Sōma Uchiyama	Catcher	Seiryo High School
#4	Hiyu Motoyama	Infielder	Tohoku Fukushi University
#5	Hidetaka Namiki	Outfielder	Dokkyo University
#6	Kota Katekaru	Pitcher	Japan Aviation Ishikawa High School
Developmental Player Draft
#1	Shinnosuke Shimo	Pitcher	Takasaki University of Health and Welfare Takasaki High School
#2	**Yoshihiro Akahane**	Infielder	Shinano Grandserows
#3	Sho Matsui	Catcher	Shinano Grandserows
#4	**Shota Maruyama**	Pitcher	Nishinippon Institute of Technology

=== Hokkaido Nippon-Ham Fighters ===
Pick	Player name	Position	Team
#1	Hiromi Itoh	Pitcher	Tomakomai Komazawa University
#2	Ryota Isobata	Outfielder	Chuo University
#3	Yudai Furukawa	Catcher	Jobu University
#4	Ryohei Hosokawa	Infielder	Chiben Gakuen Wakayama High School
#5	Haruka Nemoto	Pitcher	Tomakomai Central High School
#6	Yuma Imagawa	Outfielder	JFE Steel Eastern Japan
Developmental Player Draft
#1	Ryodai Matsumoto	Pitcher	Hanamaki Higashi High School
#2	Shinji Saitoh	Pitcher	Tokyo University of Information Sciences

=== Hiroshima Toyo Carp ===
Pick	Player name	Position	Team
#1	Ryoji Kuribayashi	Pitcher	Toyota
#2	Daisuke Moriura	Pitcher	Tenri University
#3	Haruki Ohmichi	Pitcher	Hachinohe Gakuin University
#4	Tatsuto Kobayashi	Pitcher	Chiben Gakuen Wakayama High School
#5	Shun Namiki	Pitcher	Tokushima Indigo Socks
#6	Masaya Yano	Infielder	Asia University
Developmental Player Draft
#1	Shoichi Futamata	Catcher	Iwata Higashi High School

=== Tohoku Rakuten Golden Eagles ===
Pick	Player name	Position	Team
#1	Takahisa Hayakawa	Pitcher	Waseda University
#2	Koichi Takada	Pitcher	Hosei University
#3	Masaru Fujii	Pitcher	Eneos
#4	Takuma Uchima	Pitcher	Asia University
#5	Daiki Irie	Infielder	Sendai Ikuei High School
#6	Seiryu Uchi	Pitcher	Riseisha High School
Developmental Player Draft
#1	Shun Ishida	Pitcher	Tochigi Golden Braves

=== Yokohama DeNA Baystars ===
Pick	Player name	Position	Team
#1	Taisei Irie	Pitcher	Meiji University
#2	Shugo Maki	Infielder	Chuo University
#3	Ryunosuke Matsumoto	Pitcher	Yokohama High School
#4	Daichi Kobukata	Infielder	Riseisha High School
#5	Sota Ikeya	Pitcher	Yamaha Corporation
#6	Takuto Takada	Pitcher	Shizuoka Commercial High School
Developmental Player Draft
#1	**Tatsuya Ishikawa**	Pitcher	Hosei University
#2	Dai Kato	Pitcher	Yokohama Hayato High School

=== Saitama Seibu Lions ===
Pick	Player name	Position	Team
#1	Kento Watanabe	Infielder	Toin University of Yokohama
#2	Takeru Sasaki	Pitcher	NTT East
#3	Takayoshi Yamamura	Infielder	Tokai University Sagami High School
#4	Gakuto Wakabayashi	Outfielder	Komazawa University
#5	Ren Omagari	Pitcher	Fukuoka University
#6	Brandon Taiga Tysinger	Infielder	Tokyo University of Agriculture Hokkaido Okhotsk
#7	Yuta Nakamigawa	Outfielder	Osaka Toin High School
Developmental Player Draft
#1	**Yuto Akagami**	Pitcher	Tohoku University of Community Service and Science
#2	**Shinya Hasegawa**	Outfielder	Tsuruga Kehi High School
#3	Ken Joseph Miyamoto	Outfielder	Nagoya Gakuin University
#4	Taishi Mameda	Pitcher	Urawa Business Academy High School
#5	**Yoshinobu Mizukami**	Pitcher	Shikoku Gakuin University

=== Hanshin Tigers ===
Pick	Player name	Position	Team
#1	Teruaki Sato	Infielder	Kindai University
#2	Masashi Itoh	Pitcher	JR East
#3	Ren Satoh	Pitcher	Jobu University
#4	Yuki Sakaeda	Catcher	Ritsumeikan University
#5	Shoki Murakami	Pitcher	Toyo University
#6	Takumu Nakano	Infielder	Mitsubishi Motors Okazaki
#7	Nozomu Takatera	Infielder	Ueda Nishi High School
#8	Daichi Ishii	Pitcher	Kochi Fighting Dogs
Developmental Player Draft
#1	**Masaki Iwata**	Pitcher	Kyushu Sangyo University

=== Chiba Lotte Marines ===
Pick	Player name	Position	Team
#1	Shota Suzuki	Pitcher	Hosei University
#2	Shunsuke Nakamori	Pitcher	Akashi Commercial High School
#3	Ryusei Ogawa	Infielder	Kokugakuin University
#4	Tokito Kawamura	Pitcher	Seisa Dohto University
#5	Ryosuke Nishikawa	Outfielder	Tokai University Sagami High School
Developmental Player Draft
#1	Yuito Tanigawa	Catcher	Rissho University Shonan High School
#2	**Kenta Onuma**	Pitcher	Ibaraki Astro Planets
#3	**Daito Yamamoto**	Outfielder	Kaisei High School
#4	**Shoma Sato**	Pitcher	Senshu University

=== Chunichi Dragons ===
Pick	Player name	Position	Team
#1	Hiroto Takahashi	Pitcher	Chukyo University Chukyo High School
#2	Hiroto Mori	Pitcher	Nippon Sport Science University
#3	Ryūku Tsuchida	Infielder	Ohmi High School
#4	Shota Fukushima	Pitcher	Kurashiki Technical High School
#5	Tsubasa Kato	Pitcher	Teikyo University Kani High School
#6	Hironori Miyoshi	Outfielder	JFE Steel Western Japan
Developmental Player Draft
#1	**Ren Kondō**	Pitcher	Sapporo Gakuin University
#2	**Kōtarō Ueda**	Pitcher	Kyoei High School
#3	Yūta Matsukihira	Pitcher	Seika High School

=== Fukuoka SoftBank Hawks ===
Pick	Player name	Position	Team
#1	Tomoya Inoue	Infielder	Hanasaki Tokuharu High School
#2	Yoshiyasu Sasagawa	Outfielder	Yokohama Commercial High School
#3	Kota Makihara	Catcher	Nihon University Fujisawa High School
#4	Jumpei Kawarada	Infielder	Aomori Yamada High School
#5	Sota Tanoue	Pitcher	Riseisha High School
Developmental Player Draft
#1	Hiroki Satoh	Pitcher	Keio University
#2	Yuya Nakamichi	Pitcher	Hachinohe Gakuin University
#3	Shuji Kuwahara	Pitcher	Kamimura Gakuen High School
#4	Shinnosuke Haya	Outfielder	Kyoto International High School
#5	**Riku Ogata**	Infielder	Komazawa University
#6	Shoma Itani	Catcher	Meiho High School
#7	Shinno Ohshiro	Pitcher	Ginoza High School
#8	**Ryota Nakamura**	Pitcher	Tokyo University of Agriculture Hokkaido Okhotsk

=== Yomiuri Giants ===
Pick	Player name	Position	Team
#1	Ryuta Heinai	Pitcher	Asia University
#2	Iori Yamasaki	Pitcher	Tokai University
#3	Raito Nakayama	Intfielder	Chukyo High School attached to Chukyo University
#4	Yusuke Itoh	Pitcher	Mitsubishi Power
#5	Yuto Akihiro	Catcher	Nishogakusha University High School
#6	Itsuki Yamamoto	Intfielder	Chukyo University
#7	Tetsu Hagiwara	Catcher	Soka University
Developmental Player Draft
#1	Hiroto Okamoto	Intfielder	Yonago Higashi High School
#2	**Ryusuke Kita**	Catcher	Kyoto University of Advanced Science
#3	Naoki Kasashima	Pitcher	Tsuruga Kehi High School
#4	Motoya Kinoshita	Pitcher	Yokohama High School
#5	Kenki Maeda	Catcher	Komazawa University
#6	Hayato Sakamoto	Catcher	Karatsu Commercial High School
#7	**Natsuki Toda**	Pitcher	Tokushima Indigo Socks
#8	Kenyu Abe	Pitcher	Sapporo Otani High School
#9	Riku Naraki	Pitcher	University of Tsukuba
#10	Yusuke Yamasaki	Pitcher	Fukuyama University
#11	Koichi Hoshina	Outfielder	Soka University
#12	Ren Katoh	Infielder	Faculty of Oceanography, Tokai University

Preceded by **2019**	**Nippon Professional Baseball draft**	Succeeded by **2021**
