= Shoma Sato =

Shoma Sato may refer to:

- Shoma Sato (baseball, born 1989)
- Shoma Sato (baseball, born 1998)
- Shoma Sato (swimmer)
