= Tomoya Inoue =

Japanese baseball player (born 2003)

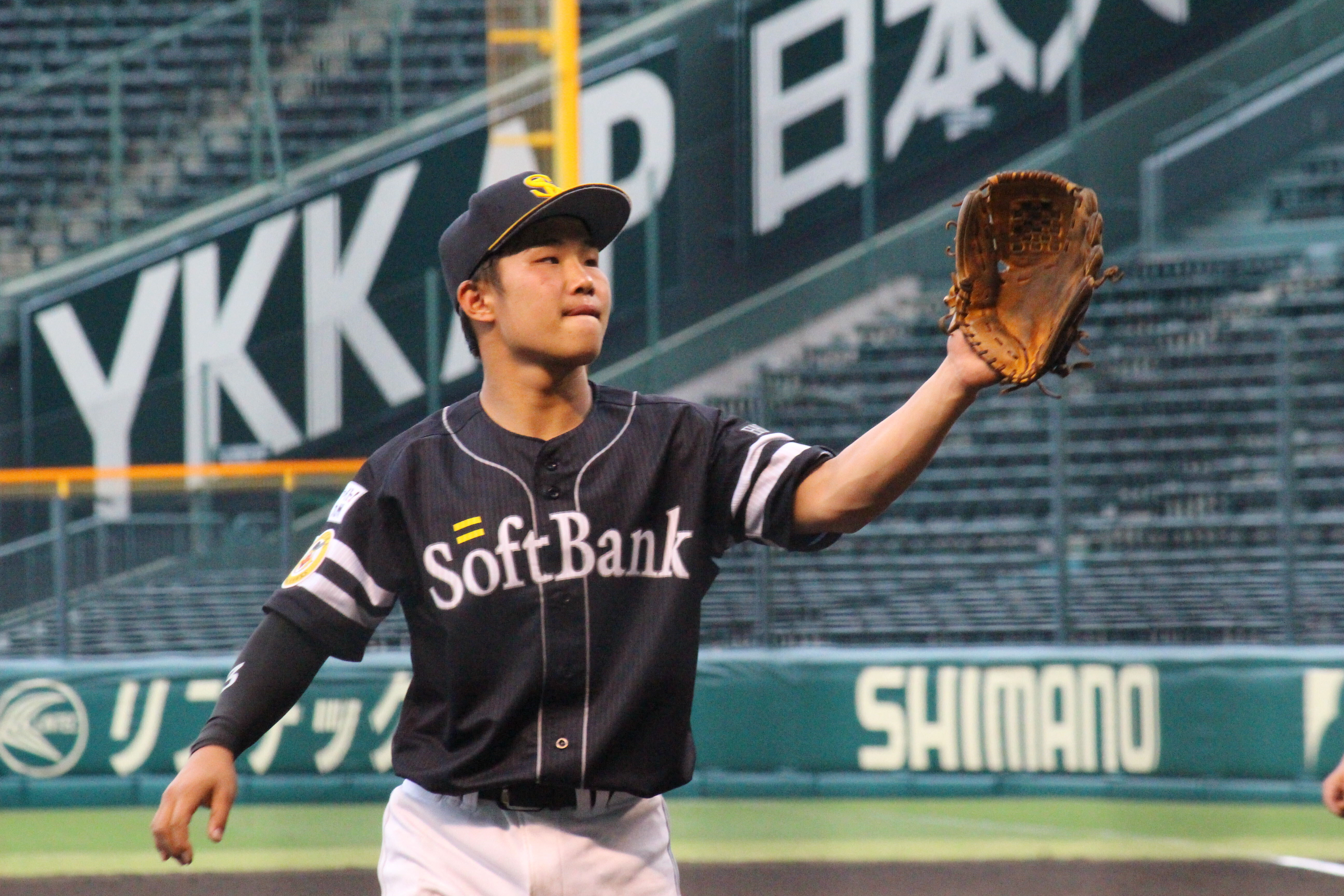
- Inoue with the Fukuoka SoftBank Hawks.

Yokohama DeNA BayStars – No. 40
- Infielder
- Born: January 28, 2003 (age 23); Shijōnawate, Osaka, Japan
- Bats: Right Throws: Right

NPB debut
- September 6, 2023, for the Fukuoka SoftBank Hawks

NPB statistics (through 2025 season)
- Batting average: .181
- Home runs: 1
- Run batted in: 4

Teams
- Fukuoka SoftBank Hawks (2021–2026); Yokohama DeNA BayStars (2026–present)

Career highlights and awards
- Japan Series champion (2025)

Tomoya Inoue (井上 朋也, Inoue Tomoya; born January 28, 2003) is a Japanese professional baseball infielder for the Yokohama DeNA BayStars of Nippon Professional Baseball (NPB).

== Professional career ==
On October 26, 2020, Inoue was drafted by the Fukuoka Softbank Hawks in the first round in the 2020 Nippon Professional Baseball draft.

In 2021 season, he played in the Western League of NPB's second league, and also played in the informal matches against the Shikoku Island League Plus's teams and amateur baseball teams. And he appeared in 45 games in the Western League, batting .246 with 3 home runs and 11 RBIs.

In 2022 season, Inoue suffered from lower back pain, underwent surgery for a herniated disc in August, and spent the season rehabbing.

On September 6, 2023, Inoue made his First League debut in the Pacific League against the Chiba Lotte Marines, and recorded his first Hit. And on September 25, he recorded first home run against the Chiba Lotte Marines.
