= Ryoto Kita =

Japanese baseball player (born 2002)

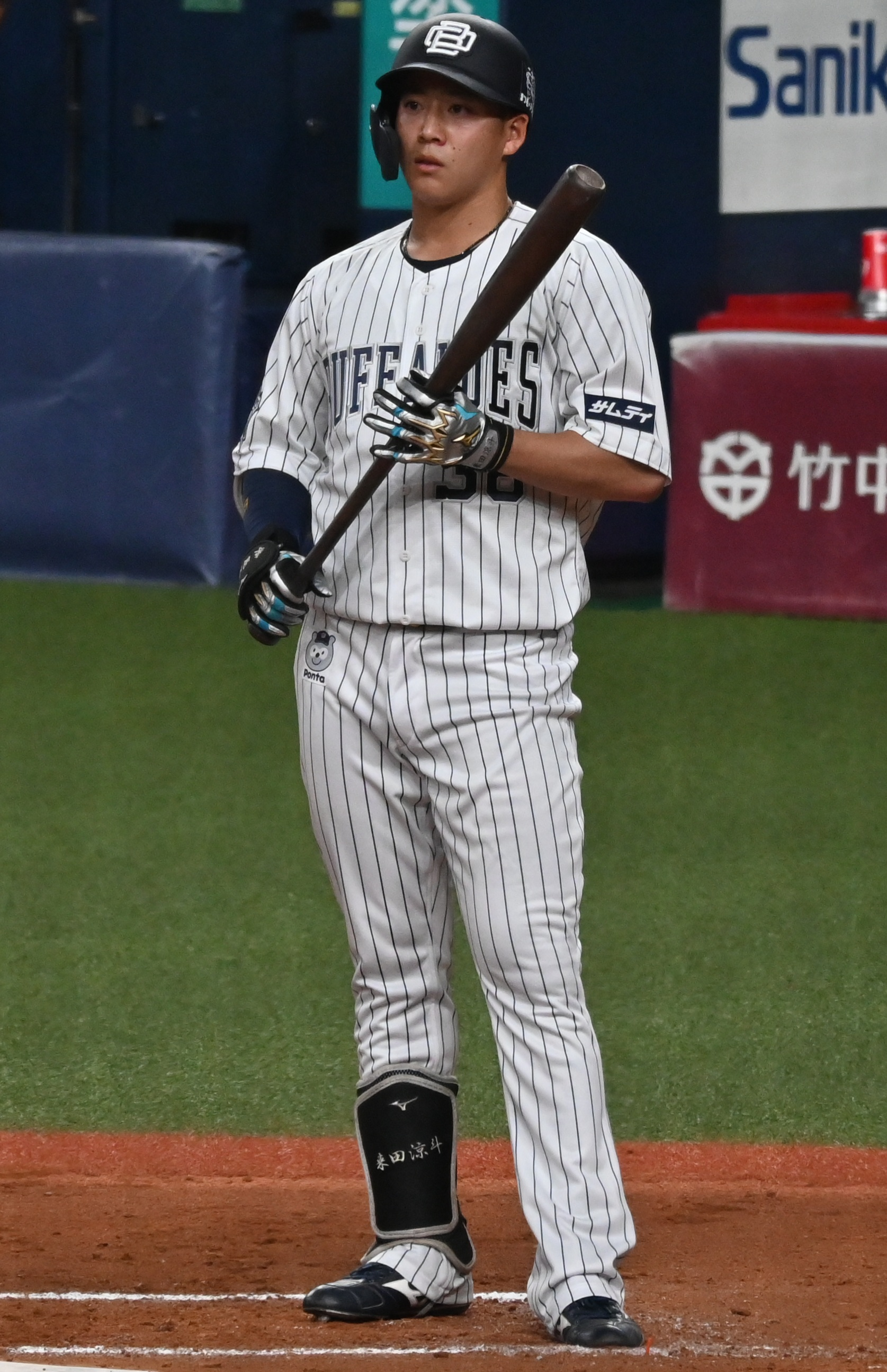

Orix Buffaloes – No. 38
- Outfielder
- Born: October 16, 2002 (age 24); Kobe, Hyōgo, Japan
- Bats: Left Throws: Right

NPB debut
- July 13, 2021, for the Orix Buffaloes

NPB statistics (through 2026 season)
- Batting average: .232
- Home runs: 15
- Runs batted in: 67
- Stats at Baseball Reference

Teams
- Orix Buffaloes (2021–)

Ryoto Kita (Japanese: 来田 涼斗; born October 16, 2002) is a Japanese professional baseball outfielder for the Orix Buffaloes of Nippon Professional Baseball (NPB).

== Early life ==
Kita was born on October 16, 2002, in Kobe, Hyogo. As a sixth-grader, Kita played in the annual NPB Junior Tournament, a tournament consisting of elementary schoolers chosen by all twelve NPB teams, for the Orix Buffaloes. Kita played high school baseball for Akashi Commercial High School, where he was teammates with current Chiba Lotte Marines player Shunsuke Nakamori.

== Career ==
=== Orix Buffaloes ===
On October 26, 2020, Kita was selected by the Orix Buffaloes in the 3rd round of the 2020 NPB draft, out of Akashi Commercial High School. Kita was scouted by the first female scout in Japanese baseball history, Emi Inui.

On July 13, 2021, Kita made his professional debut as the starting left fielder against the Hokkaido Nippon-Ham Fighters. He hit a 2-run-home run on the first pitch of his first at-bat off Takahide Ikeda in the 1st inning. In his second at-bat in the top of the 3rd inning, Kita singled to left field and recorded his first stolen base. He also recorded an infield hit in his third at-bat in the top of the 6th inning. Kita finished the season, playing 23 games and batting .211 with 2 home runs and 8 runs batted in.

On May 26, 2022, Kita collided in a defensive play with his teammate, and suffered a concussion. Kita ultimately only played in 10 games for the first team.

Kita made the opening day roster in 2023 and was starting left fielder against the Saitama Seibu Lions. However, he was removed from the first team roster after poor results. Kita appeared in just 4 games in the 2023 season. Kita participated in the 2023 edition of the Asia Winter Baseball League, held in Taiwan. Across 17 games and 59 at-bats for the NPB Red te Kita recorded a .305 batting average, 1 home run, and 5 RBIs.

On May 1, 2024, Kita was promoted to the first team after hitting .364 and 1 home run with the farm team. On May 5, Kita hit a 2-run single against the Nippon-Ham Fighters, recording his first RBI for the first team in over three years. On August 1, Kita hit a solo-home run off Ryusei Kawano of the Fighters, his first home run in three years. Kita ended the year playing 53 games, batting .212 with two home runs and 11 RBIs.

Kita started the 2025 season in the farm team. In the Western League, he played in 21 games, recording a batting average of .391, 1 home run, and 7 RBIs, and was promoted to the first team on May 3. After being sent down in response to Edward Olivares' promotion in August 2 and being called up again on September 7, Kita ended the year with batting average of .234, 2 home runs, 5 RBIs, and 5 stolen bases. On Novemeber 22, Kita renewed his contract for an estimated annual salary of 19 million yen.

== Personal life ==
As a native of Kobe, Kita was a childhood Orix fan, who admired players such as Yoshio Itoi and Tomotaka Sakaguchi.

Kita is married to professional golfer Karen Tsuroka.
