= Jumpei Kawarada =

Japanese baseball player (born 2002)

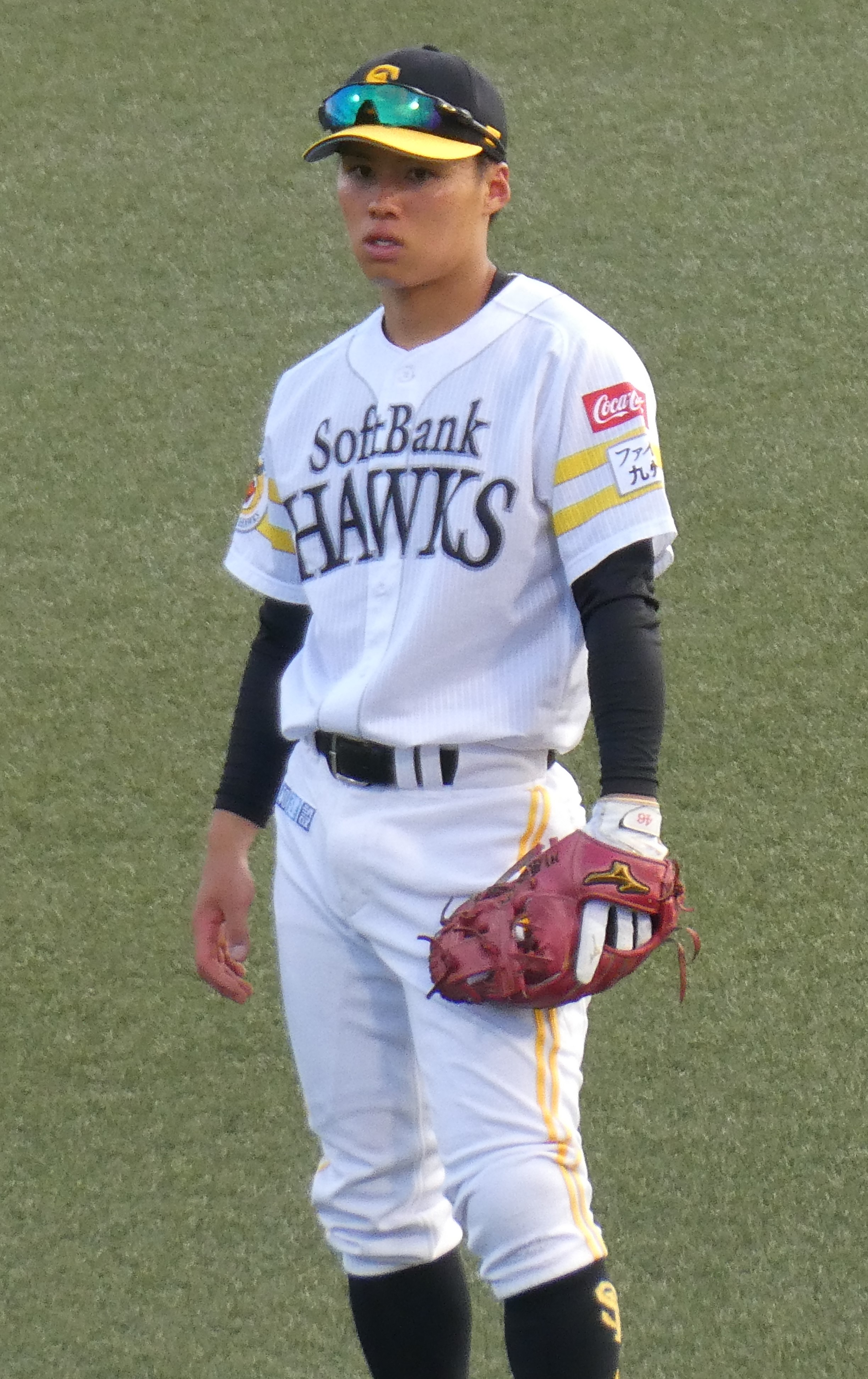
- Kawarada with the Fukuoka SoftBank Hawks.

Yomiuri Giants – No. 067
- Infielder
- Born: May 21, 2002 (age 24); Hanamaki, Iwate, Japan
- Bats: Right Throws: Right

NPB debut
- July 5, 2022, for the Fukuoka SoftBank Hawks

NPB statistics (through 2023 season)
- Batting average: .000
- Home runs: 0
- RBI: 0
- Hits: 0

Teams
- Fukuoka SoftBank Hawks (2021–2025); Yomiuri Giants (2026–present)

Career highlights and awards
- Japan Series champion (2025)

Jumpei Kawarada (川原田 純平, Kawarada Jumpei; born May 21, 2002) is a Japanese professional baseball infielder for the Yomiuri Giants of Nippon Professional Baseball(NPB).

== Professional career ==
On October 26, 2020, Kawarada was drafted by the Fukuoka Softbank Hawks in the 2020 Nippon Professional Baseball draft.

In 2021 season, he played in the Western League of NPB's second league, and also played in the informal matches against the Shikoku Island League Plus's teams and amateur baseball teams.

On July 5, 2022, Kawarada made his First League debut in the Pacific League against the Tohoku Rakuten Golden Eagles.

In 2023 season, Kawarada injured his left knee in May and spent the season rehabbing until July. As a result, he played in 59 games in the Western League, but had only 2 games play in the Pacific League.
