= Ryūku Tsuchida =

Japanese baseball player (born 2002)

Ryūku Tsuchida 土田 龍空
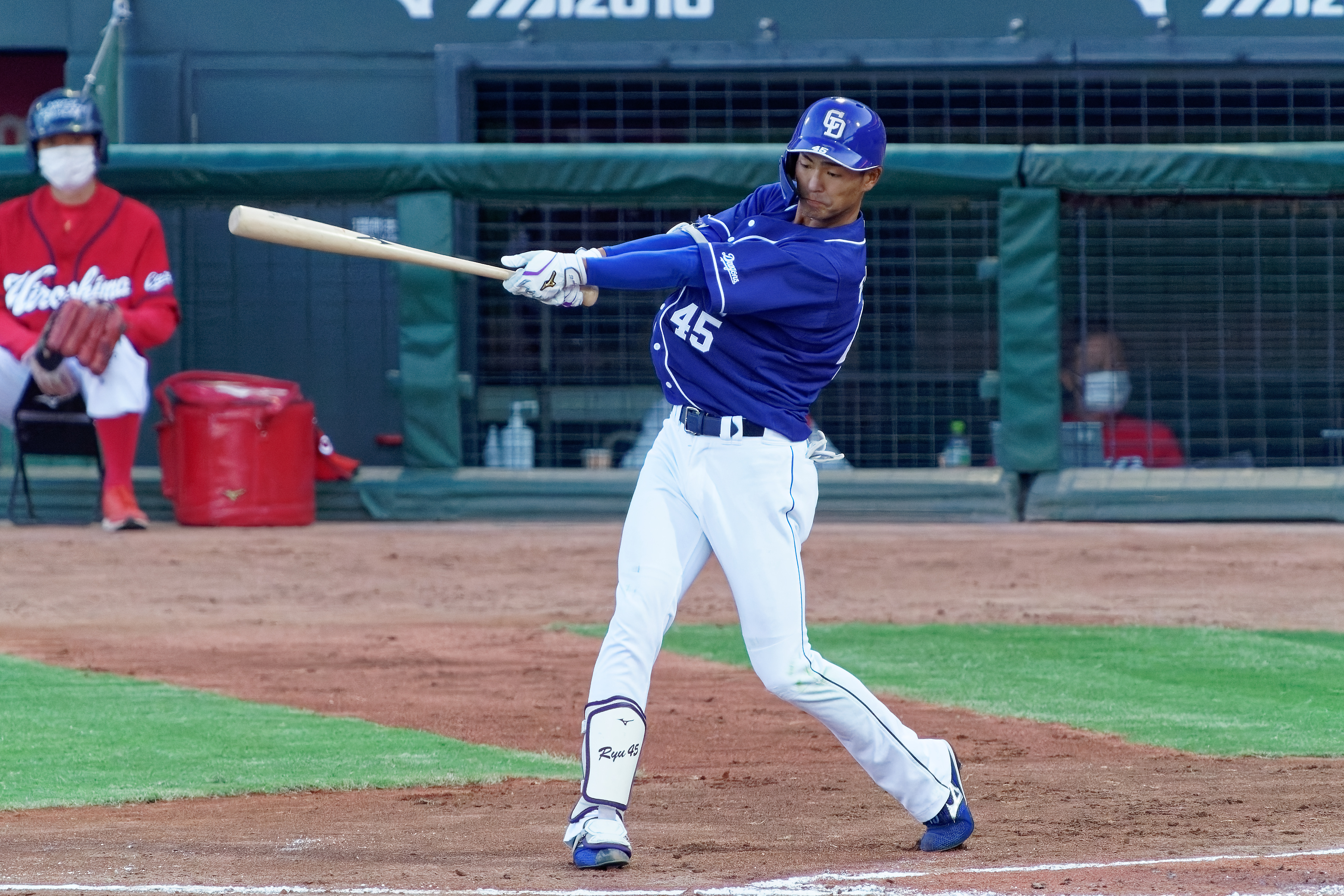

Chunichi Dragons – No. 45
- Infielder
- Born: December 30, 2002 (age 23); Maibara, Shiga, Japan
- Bats: Left Throws: Right

NPB debut
- 4 September 2021, for the Chunichi Dragons

NPB statistics (through July 26, 2026)
- Batting average: .201
- Homeruns: 3
- RBIs: 40
- Stats at Baseball Reference

Teams
- Chunichi Dragons (2021–present)

Ryūku Tsuchida (土田 龍空, Tsuchida Ryūku; born December 30, 2002) also known just as Ryūku is a professional Japanese baseball player. He is currently an infielder for the Chunichi Dragons.

== Early career ==
Tsuchida started playing baseball with in second grade. While at Maibara Municipal Middle School, he played for Kohoku Boys.

Tsuchida was a first-team regular at short-stop as a freshman for Ōmi High School and played in the 100th anniversary koshien tournament in 2018 where he lost to a Kosei Yoshida led Kanaashi Agricultural High School. In summer of his sophomore year, he would once again get playing time at koshien. In the first game, Tsuchida was responsible for 2 errors leading to a loss to Tokai University Sagami High School. In the fall, he helped his team win the Shiga Prefectural Tournament and in the first game of the Kinki Regional tournament, contributed with a 3-hit game. In his senior year, Tsuchida was installed as Ōmi's captain, and during the August training session for high schoolers trying to turn pro, he would hit a line-drive off future team-mate, Tsubasa Kato.

At the 2020 Nippon Professional Baseball draft, Tsuchida was selected in the 3rd round by the Chunichi Dragons. On 22 November he signed a ¥6,000,000 per-year deal with a ¥45,000,000 sign-on bonus.

== Play style ==
Tsuchida is said to have a prodigious batting sense with strong defensive skills.

In his high school career, he hit 30 homeruns with a batting average over .400. He can run 50 metres in 6 seconds.

== Personal life ==
Tsuchida thinks Shohei Ohtani is the ideal player and upon being drafted, mentioned his reverence for then team-mate Yota Kyoda. He also said that he would most like to face Yomiuri Giants pitcher Kai Yokogawa as they had faced each other during their middle-school days.

It is said that he gets along well with Yota Kyoda even in private settings, and after Kyoda was traded he mentioned that "I do feel a bit lonely. I would like to do my best as a fellow short-stop to catch-up to him...or I would love to win a golden glove and overtake him."

In junior high, Tsuchida was in the athletics club and has experience coming 6th in the Shiga prefectural tournament high jump competition.
