= Shunpeita Yamashita =

Japanese baseball player (born 2002)

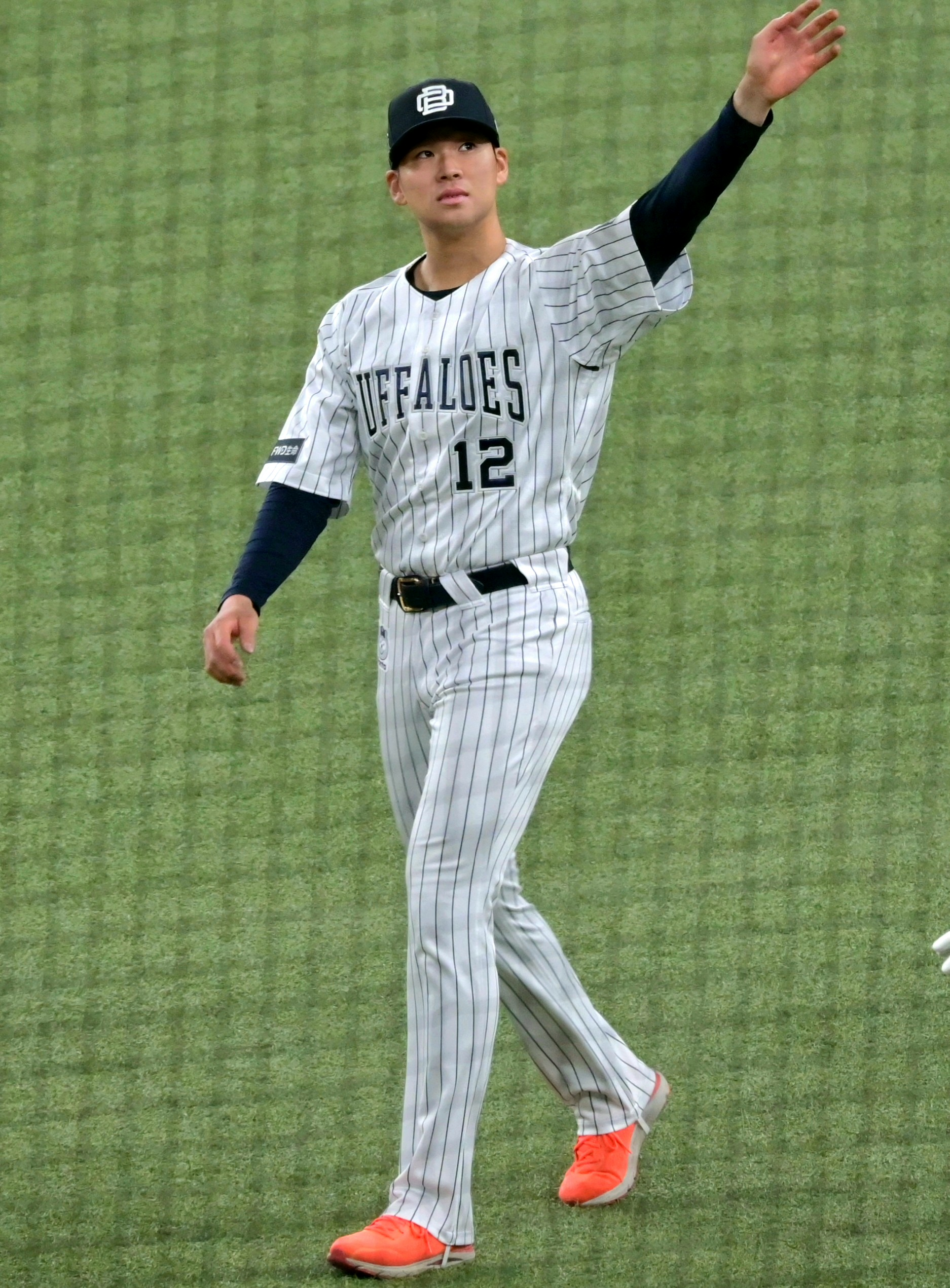
- Yamashita with the Orix Buffaloes.

Orix Buffaloes – No. 11
- Pitcher
- Born: July 16, 2002 (age 24); Minami, Fukuoka, Japan
- Bats: Right Throws: Right

NPB debut
- March 31, 2023, for the Orix Buffaloes

NPB statistics (through 2025 season)
- Win–loss record: 13-9
- Earned run average: 2.19
- Strikeouts: 215

Teams
- Orix Buffaloes (2021–present)

Career highlights and awards
- 1× NPB All-Star (2023); Pacific League Rookie of the Year (2023)

Shunpeita Yamashita (山下 舜平大, Yamashita Shunpeita; born July 16, 2002, in Minami, Fukuoka, Japan) is a Japanese professional baseball pitcher for the Orix Buffaloes of Nippon Professional Baseball (NPB).

== Career ==
=== Orix Buffaloes ===
On October 26, 2020, Yamashita was selected by the Orix Buffaloes as their 1st pick of the 2020 NPB draft.

On March 30, 2023, Yamashita was selected as the starter for Opening Day, due to the fact that Yoshinobu Yamamoto and Hiroya Miyagi had just come back from the 2023 World Baseball Classic. On March 31, Yamashita made his professional debut on Opening Day in a 3–2 win against the Saitama Seibu Lions, allowing 4 hits, 1 run, and 7 strikeouts across 5 1/3 innings pitched.

In 2023, he posted a record of 9 wins and 3 losses with an ERA of 1.61, helping the Buffaloes win the league championship and winning the Rookie of the Year award.

== Personal life ==
The pronunciation of "Shunpeita" comes from Joseph Schumpeter.

== 1External links ==
- Career statistics from Baseball Reference (Minors)
