= Sota Tanoue =

Japanese baseball player (born 2002)

Fukuoka SoftBank Hawks – No. 157
- Pitcher
- Born: November 26, 2002 (age 22); Osaka, Osaka, Japan
- Bats: Right Throws: Right

NPB debut
- April 12, 2022, for the Fukuoka SoftBank Hawks

NPB statistics (through 2025 season)
- Win–loss record: 0–0
- Earned run average: 2.45
- Strikeouts: 2

Teams
- Fukuoka SoftBank Hawks (2022–present)

Sota Tanoue (田上 奏大, Tanoue Sōta; born November 26, 2002) is a Japanese professional baseball pitcher for the Fukuoka SoftBank Hawks of Nippon Professional Baseball (NPB).

== Personal life ==
His uncle Hidenori Tanoue played as a catcher for the Hawks.

== Professional career ==
On October 26, 2020, Tanoue was drafted by the Fukuoka Softbank Hawks in the 2020 Nippon Professional Baseball draft.

In 2021 season, he played in the Western League of NPB's minor league.

April 12, 2022, he pitched his debut game against the Chiba Lotte Marines as a starting pitcher. In 2022 season, he pitched in two games in the Pacific League.

In 2023 season, Tanoue developed inflammation in his right elbow in May and spent a two month in rehabilitation. As a result, he never had a chance to pitch in the Pacific League.

On October 9, 2024, it was announced that Tanoue had been diagnosed with Langerhans cell histiocytosis, a disorder than affects 1 in 1 million adults. Despite fears he would never be able to pitch again, he faced three practice batters in a game the same day.
