= Ryohei Hosokawa =

Japanese baseball player (born 2002)

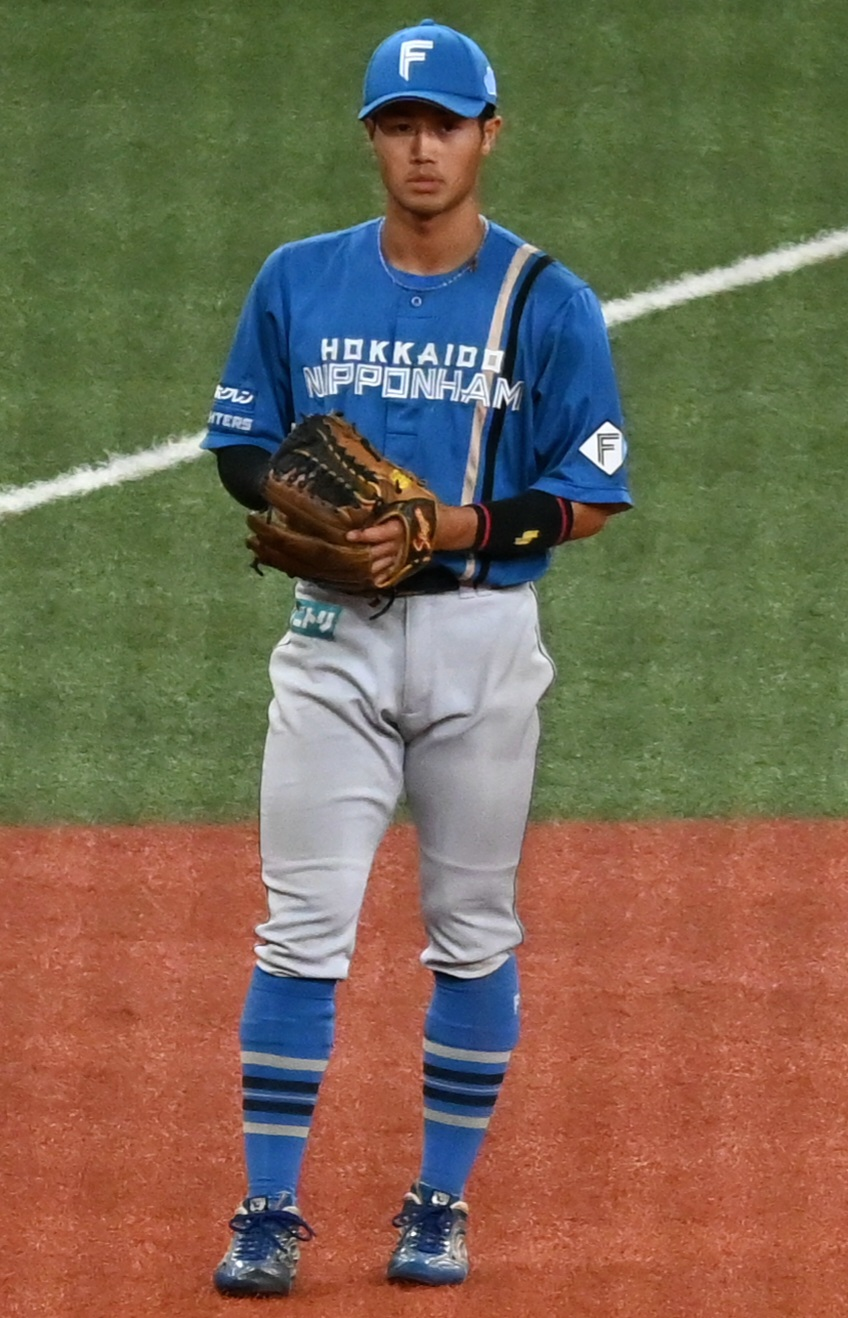

Hokkaido Nippon-Ham Fighters – No. 56
- Infielder
- Born: April 25, 2002 (age 24); Kyoto, Kyoto, Japan
- Bats: Left Throws: Right

NPB debut
- October 11, 2021, for the Hokkaido Nippon-Ham Fighters

NPB statistics (through 2025 season)
- Batting average: .202
- Hits: 47
- Home runs: 1
- Runs batted in: 18
- Stolen base: 6
- Stats at Baseball Reference

Teams
- Hokkaido Nippon-Ham Fighters (2021–present)

Ryohei Hosokawa (細川 凌平, Hosokawa Ryohei; born April 25, 2002) is a Japanese professional baseball infielder for the Hokkaido Nippon-Ham Fighters in Nippon Professional Baseball.
