= Daito Yamamoto =

Japanese baseball player (born 2002)

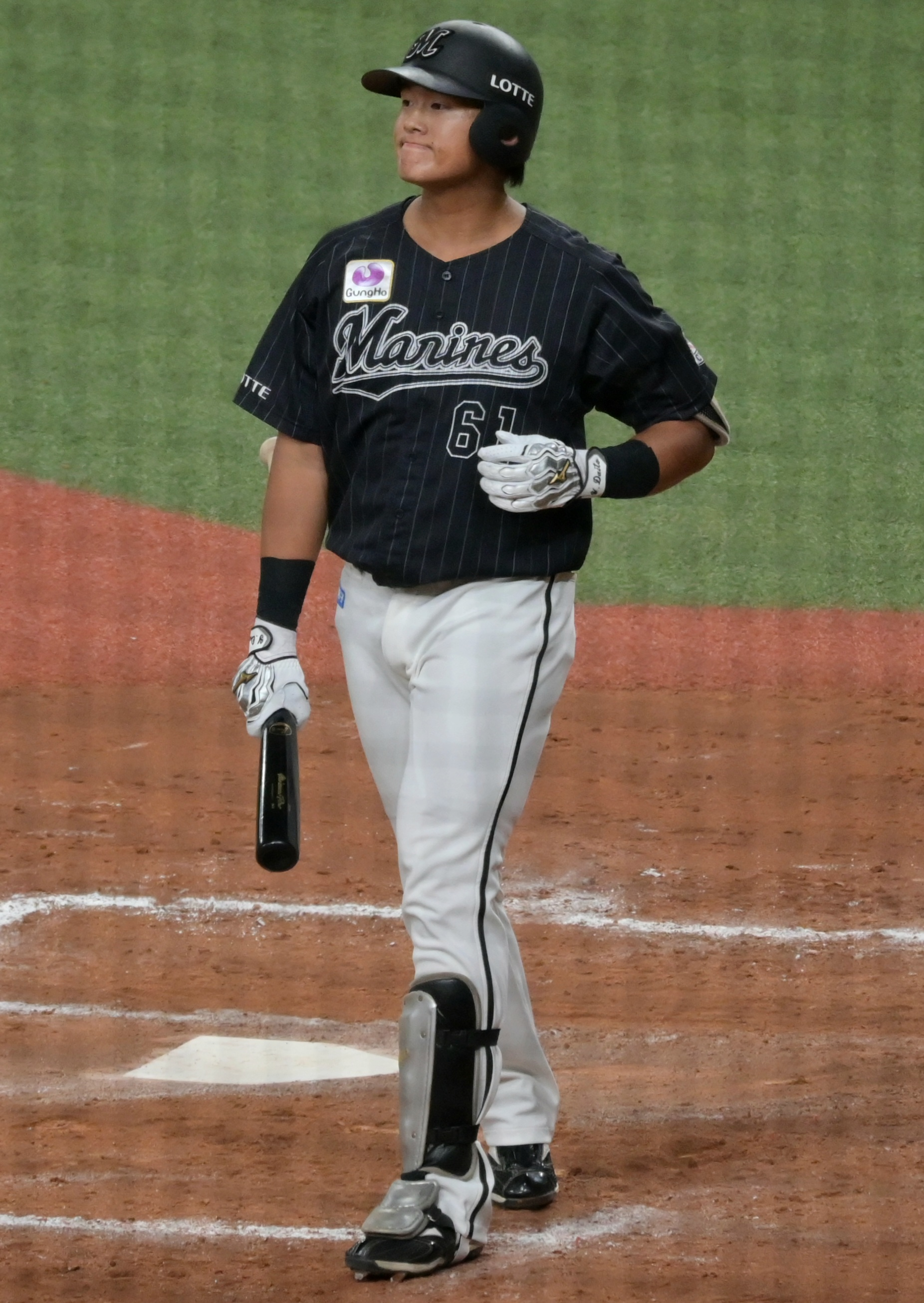

Chiba Lotte Marines – No. 61
- Outfielder
- Born: August 9, 2002 (age 23); Yonago, Tottori, Japan
- Bats: Right Throws: Right

NPB debut
- September 30, 2022, for the Chiba Lotte Marines

NPB statistics (through 2025 season)
- Batting average: .199
- Hits: 82
- Home runs: 11
- Runs batted in: 33
- Stolen base: 2
- Stats at Baseball Reference

Teams
- Chiba Lotte Marines (2021–present)

Career highlights and awards
- NPB All-Star (2025)

Daito Yamamoto (山本 大斗, Yamamoto Daito; born August 9, 2002) is a Japanese professional baseball outfielder for the Chiba Lotte Marines in Nippon Professional Baseball.
