= Ryuta Heinai =

Japanese baseball player (born 1998)

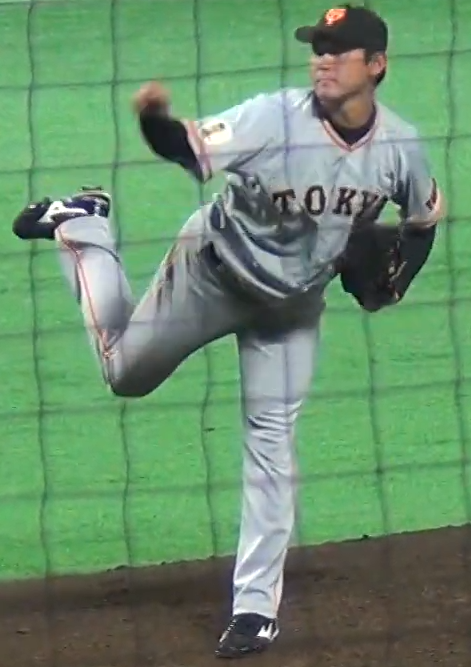

Yomiuri Giants – No. 66
- Pitcher
- Born: August 1, 1998 (age 27); Akashi, Hyōgo, Japan
- Bats: Right Throws: Right

NPB debut
- April 20, 2021, for the Yomiuri Giants

Career statistics (through April 3, 2022)
- Win–loss record: 0–1
- Earned run average: 13.50
- Strikeouts: 6

Teams
- Yomiuri Giants (2021–present)

Ryuta Heinai (平内龍太, Heinai Ryuta; born August 1, 1998, in Akashi, Hyōgo, Japan) is a professional Japanese baseball player. He is a pitcher for the Yomiuri Giants of Nippon Professional Baseball (NPB).
