= Shinya Hasegawa (baseball) =

Japanese baseball player (born 2002)

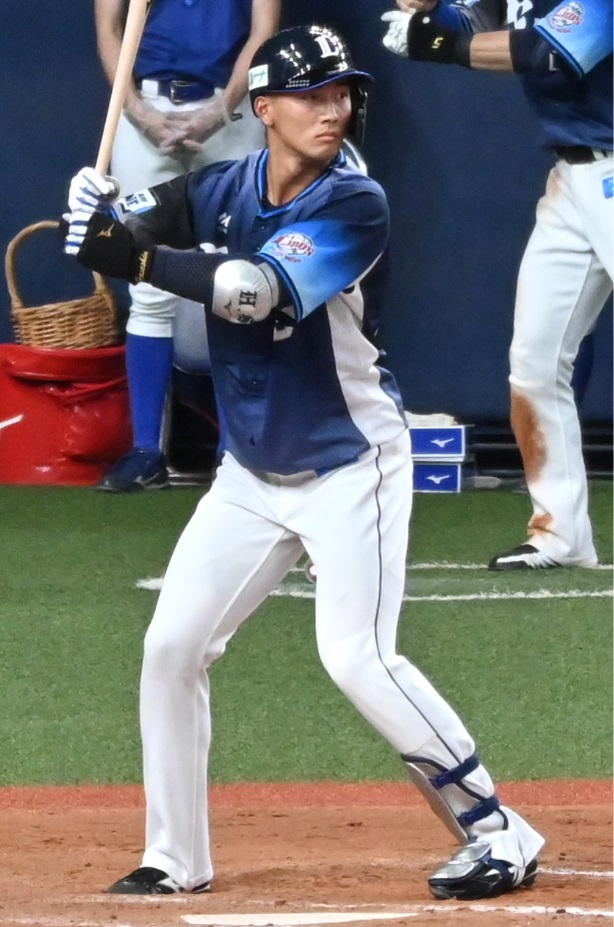

Saitama Seibu Lions – No. 63
- Outfielder
- Born: May 17, 2002 (age 23); Kyoto, Kyoto, Japan
- Bats: Right Throws: Right

NPB debut
- July 2, 2022, for the Saitama Seibu Lions

NPB statistics (through 2024 season)
- Batting average: .199
- Hits: 90
- Home runs: 6
- Runs batted in: 23
- Stolen base: 15
- Stats at Baseball Reference

Teams
- Saitama Seibu Lions (2021–present)

Shinya Hasegawa (長谷川 信哉, Hasegawa Shinya; born May 17, 2002) is a professional Japanese baseball player. He plays outfielder for the Saitama Seibu Lions.
