= Ren Omagari =

Japanese baseball player (born 1998)

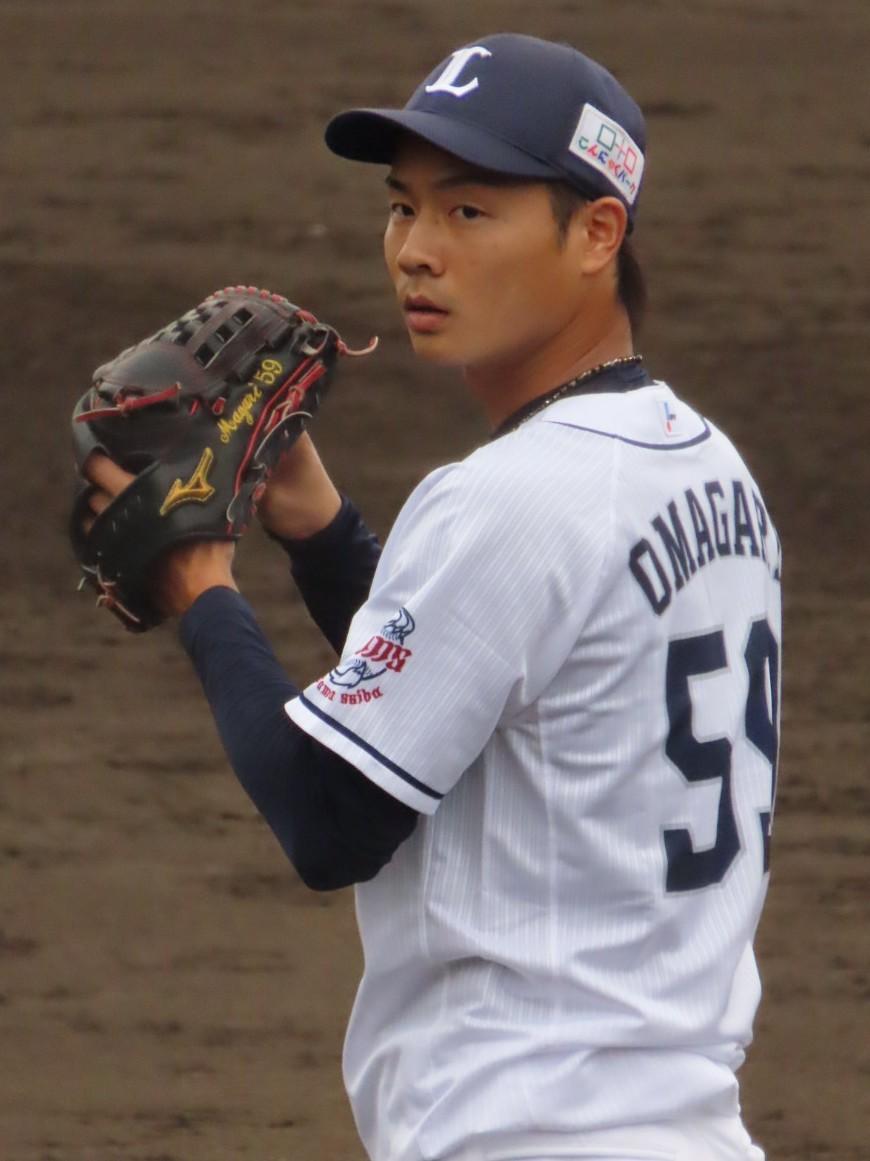

Saitama Seibu Lions – No. 112
- Pitcher
- Born: May 21, 1998 (age 27); Yanagawa, Fukuoka
- Bats: Right Throws: Right

NPB debut
- October 16, 2021, for the Saitama Seibu Lions

Career statistics (through April 5, 2022)
- Win–loss record: 0-0
- Earned Run Average: 5.40
- Strikeouts: 2
- Stats at Baseball Reference

Teams
- Saitama Seibu Lions (2021-present)

Ren Omagari (大曲錬, Omagari Ren; born May 21, 1998 in Yanagawa, Fukuoka, Japan) is a professional Japanese baseball player. He is a pitcher for the Saitama Seibu Lions of Nippon Professional Baseball (NPB).
