= Ryusei Ogawa =

Japanese baseball player (born 1998)

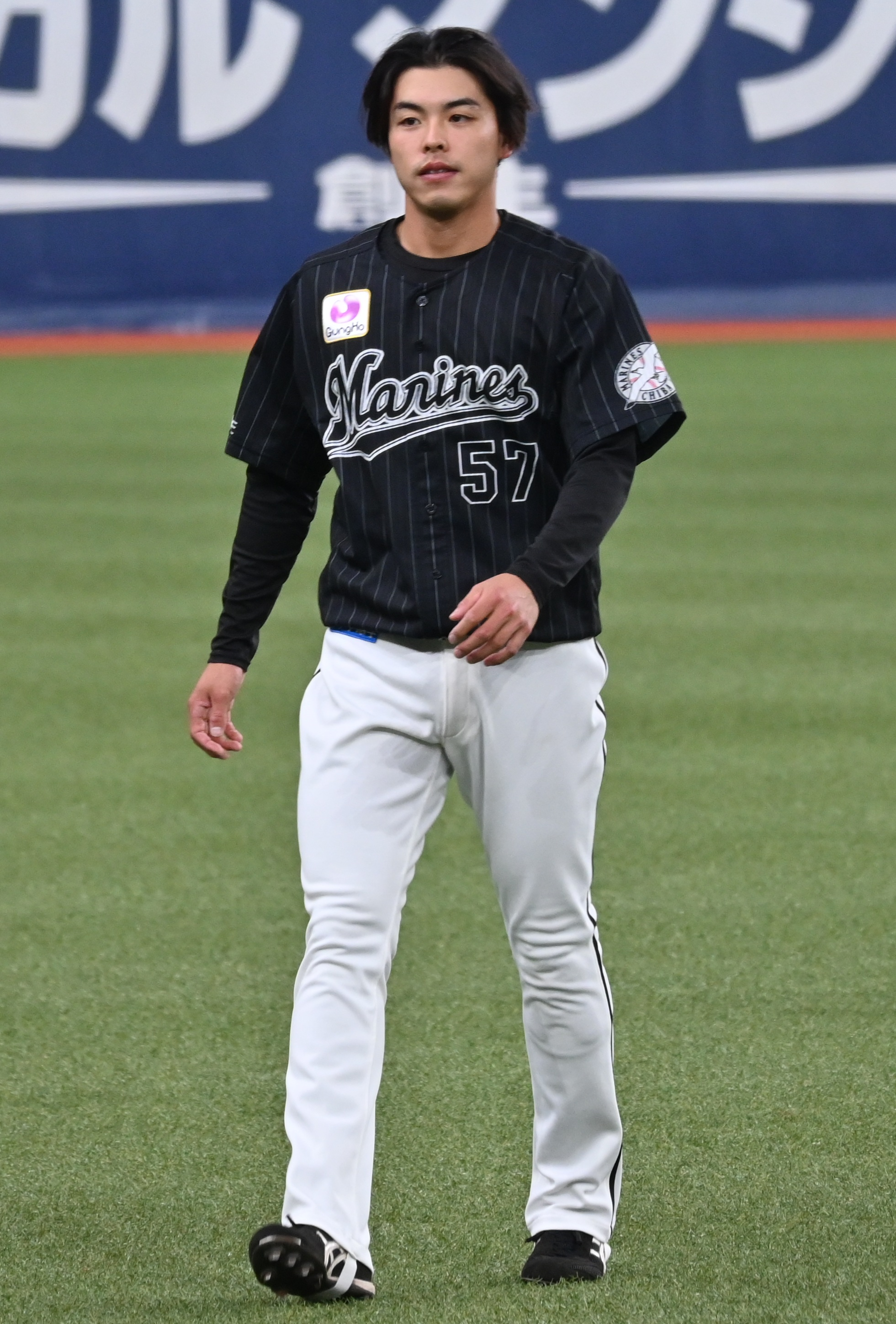

Chiba Lotte Marines – No. 57
- Infielder
- Born: April 5, 1998 (age 28); Tatebayashi, Gunma, Japan
- Bats: Left Throws: Right

debut
- August 17, 2021, for the Chiba Lotte Marines

NPB statistics (through 2023 season)
- Batting average: .111
- Hits: 9
- Home runs: 1
- Runs batted in: 5
- Sacrifice bunt: 10
- Stolen base: 9

Teams
- Chiba Lotte Marines (2021–present)

Ryūsei Ogawa (小川 龍成, Ogawa Ryūsei; born April 5, 1998 in Takebayashi, Gunma Prefecture) is a professional Japanese baseball player. He plays infielder for the Chiba Lotte Marines.
