= Naofumi Kizawa =

Japanese baseball player (born 1998)

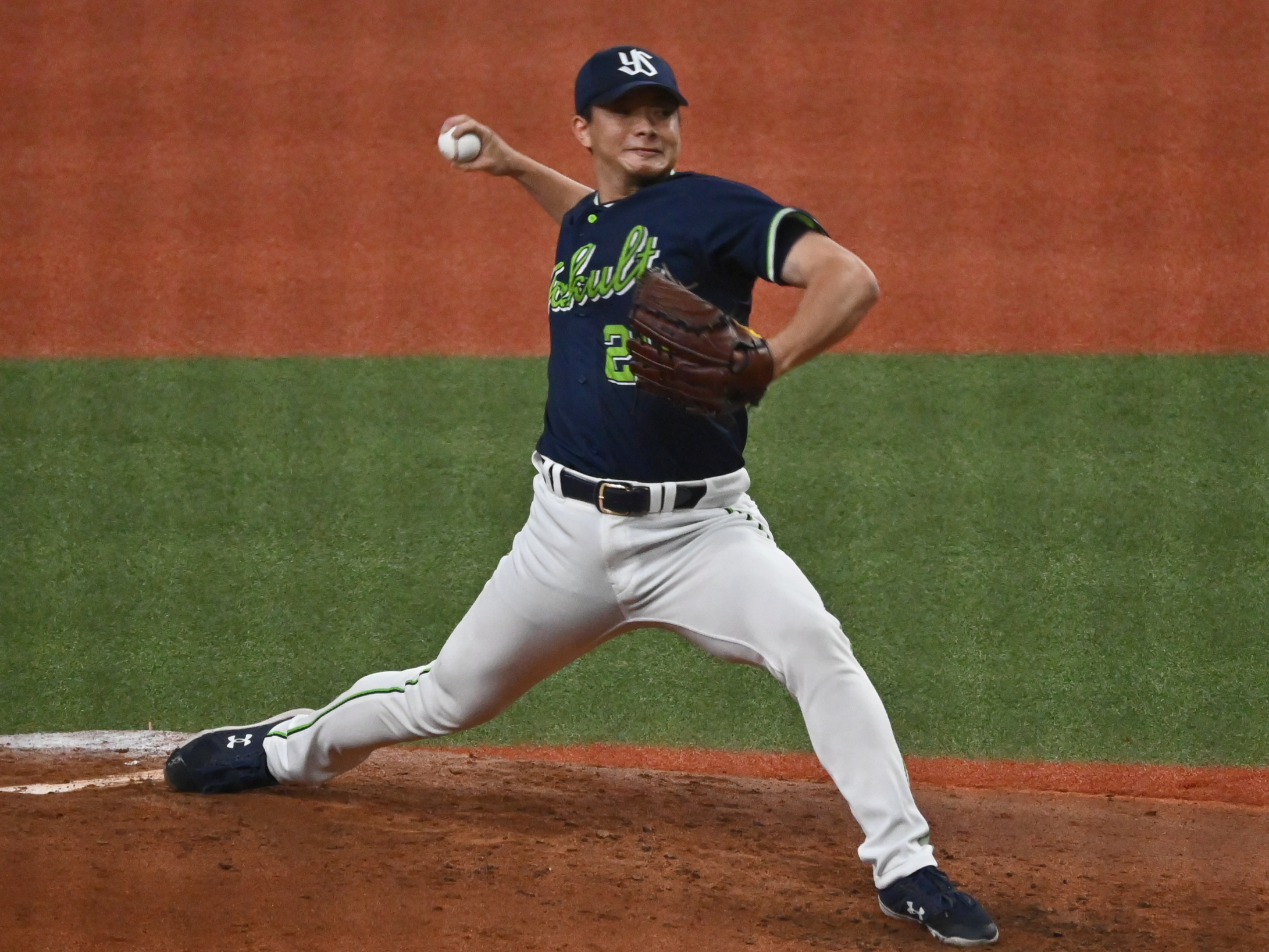

Tokyo Yakult Swallows – No. 20
- Pitcher
- Born: April 25, 1998 (age 27); Funabashi, Chiba, Japan
- Bats: Right Throws: Right

NPB debut
- March 29, 2022, for the Tokyo Yakult Swallows

Career statistics (through 2024 season)
- Win–loss record: 14-9
- Earned Run Average: 2.91
- Strikeouts: 147
- Saves: 5
- Holds: 44
- Stats at Baseball Reference

Teams
- Tokyo Yakult Swallows (2022–present)

Naofumi Kizawa (木澤 尚文, Kizawa Naofumi; born April 25, 1998 in Funabashi, Chiba, Japan) is a professional Japanese baseball player. He plays pitcher for the Tokyo Yakult Swallows.
