= Ryota Isobata =

Japanese baseball player (born 1998)

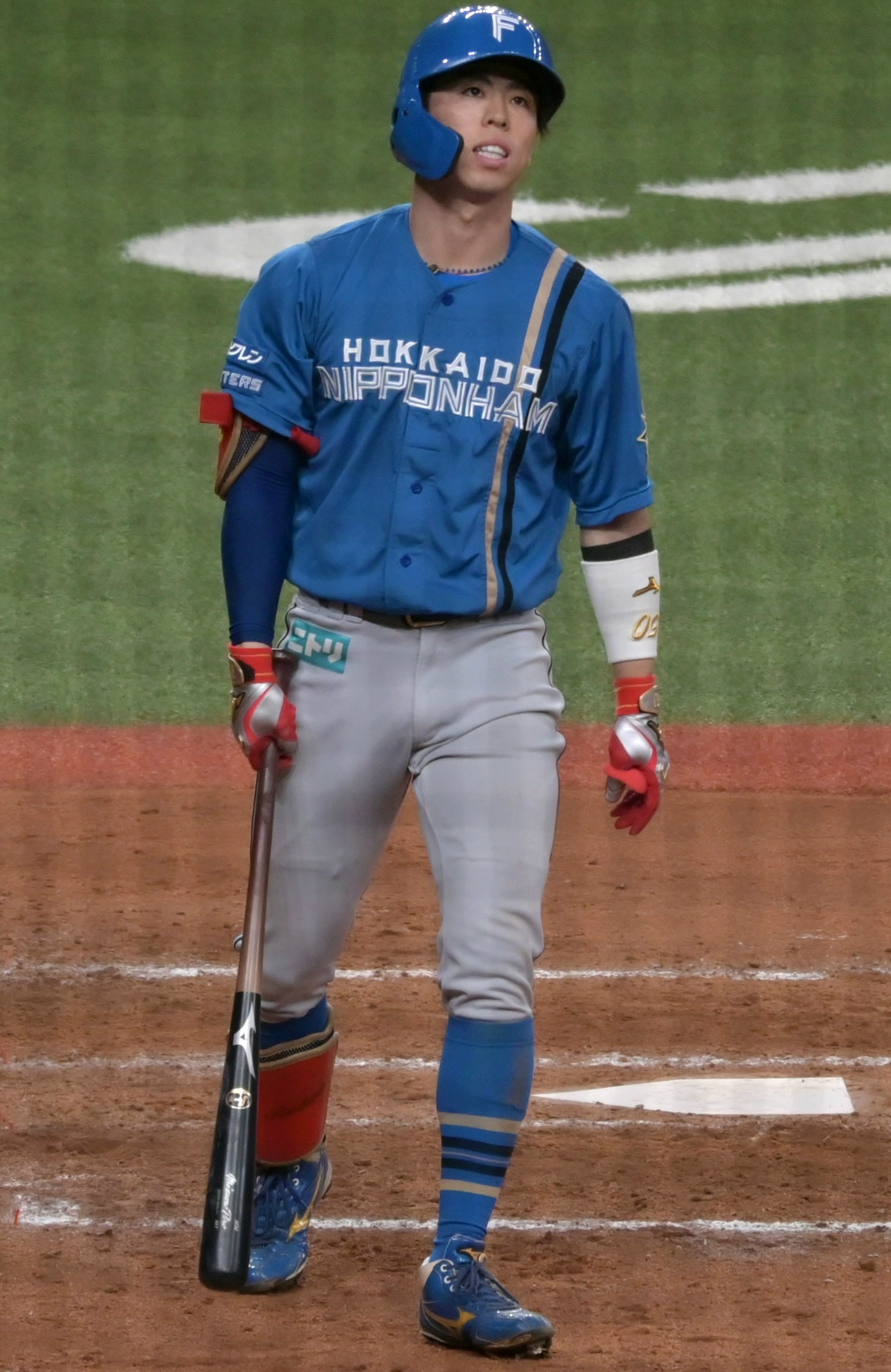

Hokkaido Nippon Ham Fighters – No. 50
- Outfielder
- Born: November 27, 1998 (age 27); Gyōda, Saitama, Japan
- Bats: Left Throws: Right

NPB debut
- May 7, 2021, for the Hokkaido Nippon-Ham Fighters

Career statistics (through 2023 Season)
- Batting average: .230
- Hits: 66
- Home runs: 1
- RBI: 12
- Stolen bases: 29
- Stats at Baseball Reference

Teams
- Hokkaido Nippon-Ham Fighters (2021–present)
Medals
Men's baseball
Representing Japan
WBSC Premier12
Silver medal – second place	2024	Team

Ryota Isobata (五十幡 亮汰, Isobata Ryota; born November 27, 1998 in Gyōda, Saitama, Japan) is a professional Japanese baseball player. He plays outfielder for the Hokkaido Nippon-Ham Fighters.
