= Hidetaka Namiki =

Japanese baseball player (born 1998)

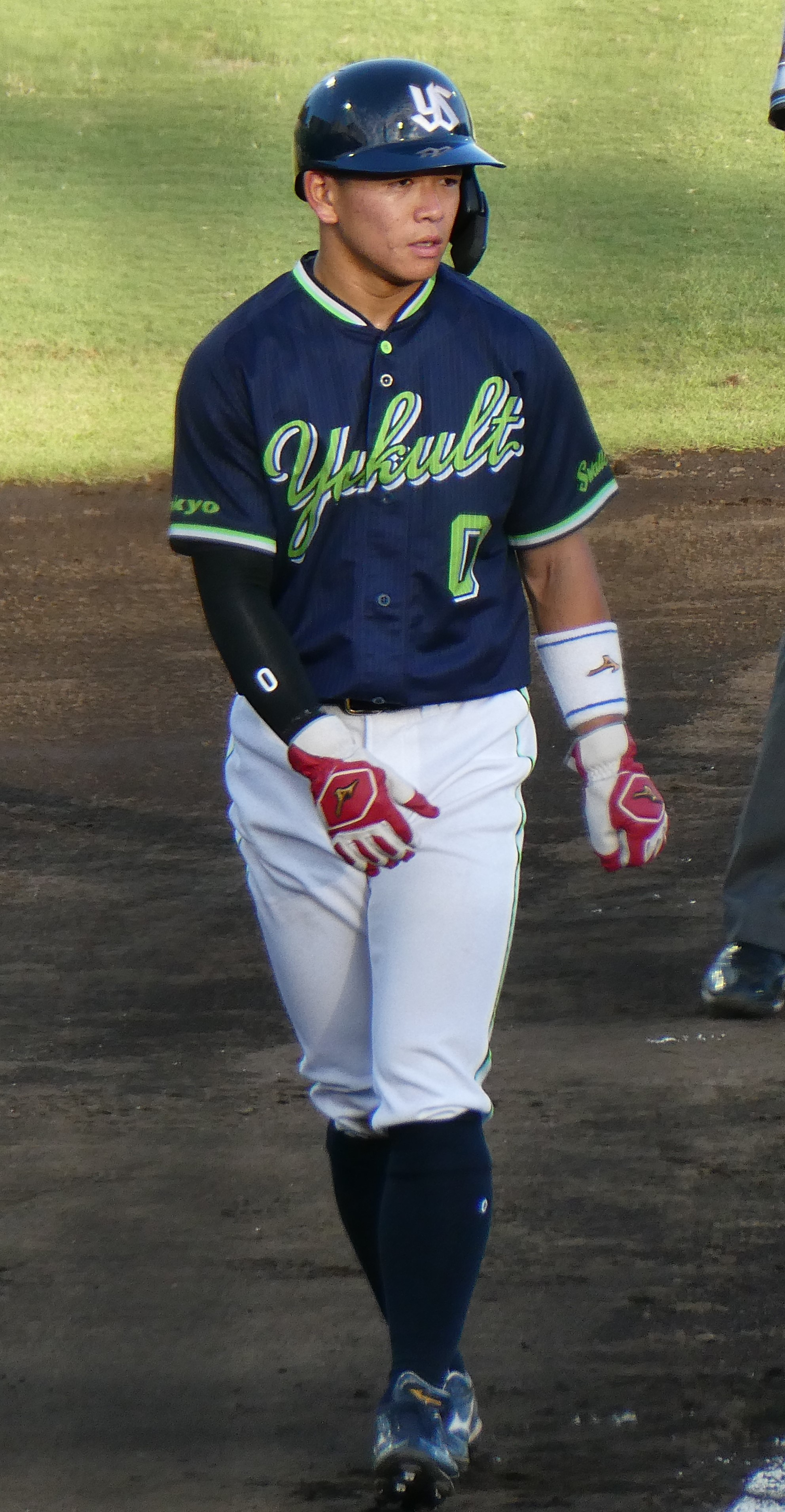

Tokyo Yakult Swallows – No. 0
- Infielder
- Born: March 23, 1999 (age 27); Sōka, Saitama, Japan
- Bats: Right Throws: Right

NPB debut
- April 4, 2021, for the Tokyo Yakult Swallows

Career statistics (through 2024 season)
- Batting average: .235
- Hits: 54
- Home runs: 2
- RBIs: 14
- Stolen bases: 31
- Stats at Baseball Reference

Teams
- Tokyo Yakult Swallows (2021–present)

Hidetaka Namiki (並木 秀尊, Namiki Hidetaka; born December 4, 1998) is a professional Japanese baseball player. He plays outfielder for the Tokyo Yakult Swallows.
