= Hiroto Mori =

Japanese baseball player (born 1998)

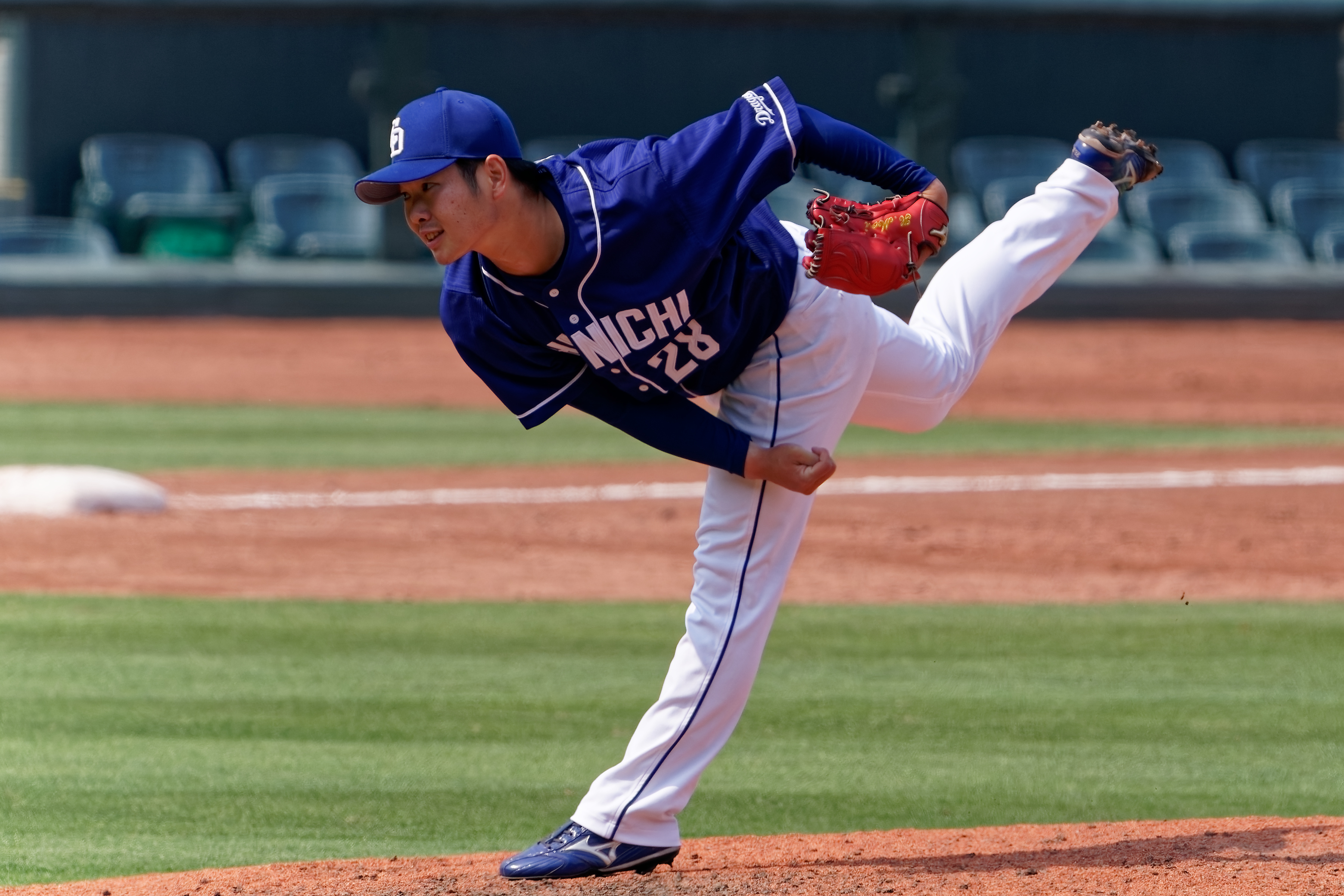

Chunichi Dragons – No. 28
- Pitcher
- Born: May 25, 1998 (age 28); Nagoya, Aichi, Japan
- Bats: Right Throws: Right

NPB debut
- September 15, 2021, for the Chunichi Dragons

Career statistics (through April 7, 2022)
- Win–loss record: 1–0
- Earned run average: 3.14
- Strikeouts: 17

Teams
- Chunichi Dragons (2021–present)

Hiroto Mori (森 博人, Mori Hiroto; born May 25, 1998) is a professional Japanese baseball player. He is a pitcher for the Chunichi Dragons of Nippon Professional Baseball (NPB).
