= Shōta Suzuki (baseball, born 1998) =

Japanese baseball player (born 1998)

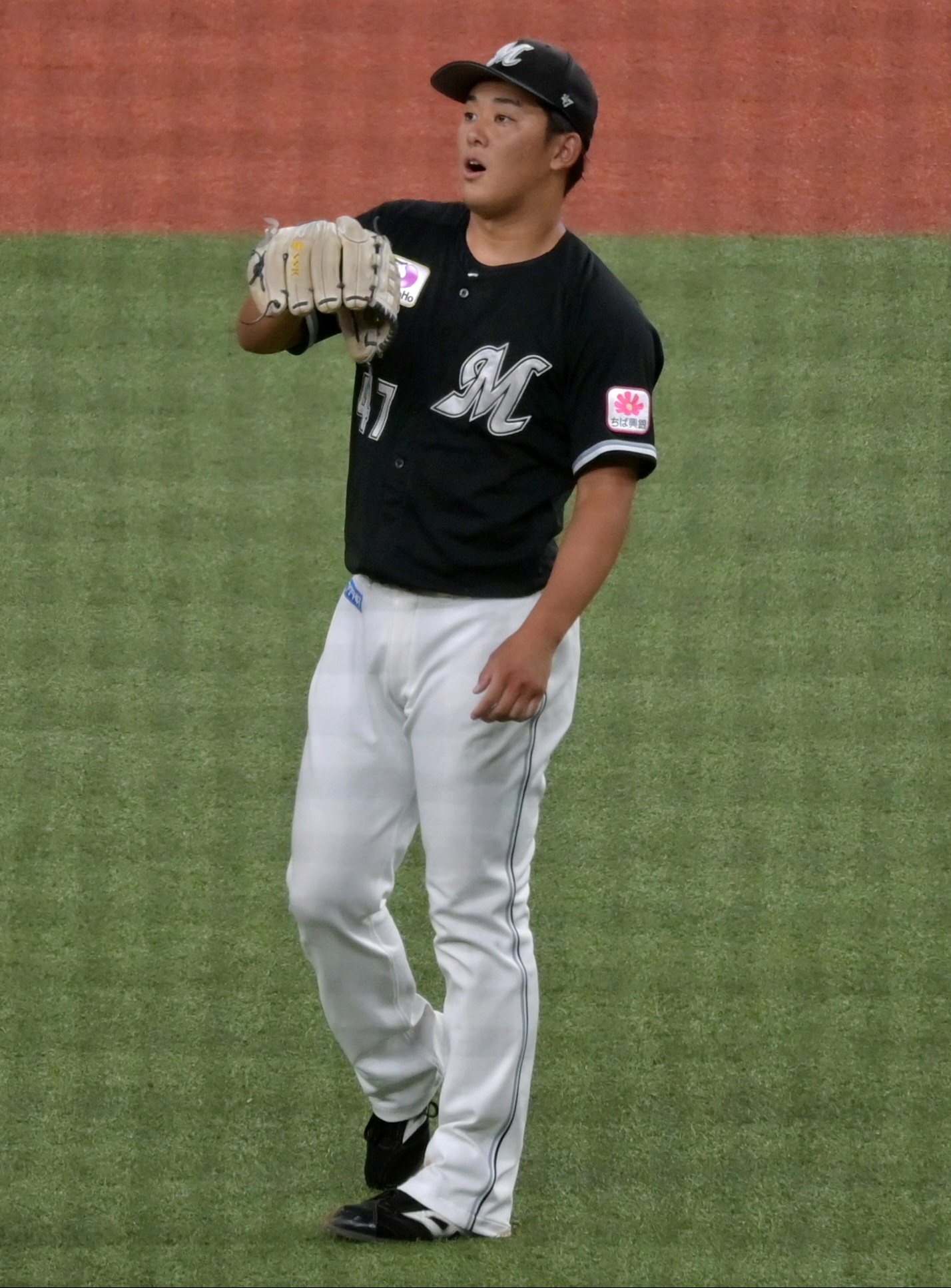

Chiba Lotte Marines – No. 47
- Pitcher
- Born: September 7, 1998 (age 27); Tsuchiura, Ibaraki, Japan
- Bats: Left Throws: Left

NPB debut
- March 28, 2021, for the Chiba Lotte Marines

NPB statistics (through 2024 season)
- Win–loss record: 4–9
- Earned Run Average: 3.15
- Strikeouts: 136

Teams
- Chiba Lotte Marines (2021–present)

Career highlights and awards
- NPB All-Star (2024)
Medals
Men's baseball
Representing Japan
WBSC Premier12
Silver medal – second place	2024	Team

Shōta Suzuki (鈴木 昭汰, Suzuki Shōta; born September 7, 1998) is a Japanese professional baseball pitcher for the Chiba Lotte Marines of Nippon Professional Baseball (NPB).

== Career ==
Suzuki began his career in 2021 with the Chiba Lotte Marines, and posted a 4.08 ERA with 76 strikeouts in 23 appearances during his rookie campaign. He made 6 appearances for the team in 2022, and struggled to a 7.30 ERA. In 2023, Suzuki pitched in 13 contests for Lotte, recording a 2.76 ERA with 13 strikeouts across 16 1/3 innings pitched.

On April 17, 2024, Suzuki earned his first career save in NPB. He was named an All-Star for the first time in 2024, after working to an 0.59 ERA across his first 32 games.
