= Yūta Matsukihira =

Japanese baseball player (born 2003)

Yūta Matsukihira 松木平 優太

Chunichi Dragons – No. 29
- Starting pitcher
- Born: February 24, 2003 (age 23); Osaka, Osaka, Japan
- Bats: Right Throws: Right

NPB debut
- July 10, 2024, for the Chunichi Dragons

NPB statistics (through 2025 season)
- Win–loss record: 2-4
- Innings pitched: 51.2
- Earned run average: 3.48
- Strikeouts: 43
- Saves: 0
- Holds: 0

Teams
- Chunichi Dragons (2024–present)

Yūta Matsukihira (松木平 優太, Matsukihira Yūta; born February 24, 2003) is a Japanese professional baseball pitcher for the Chunichi Dragons of Nippon Professional Baseball (NPB).
