= Masaya Yano =

Japanese baseball player (born 1998)

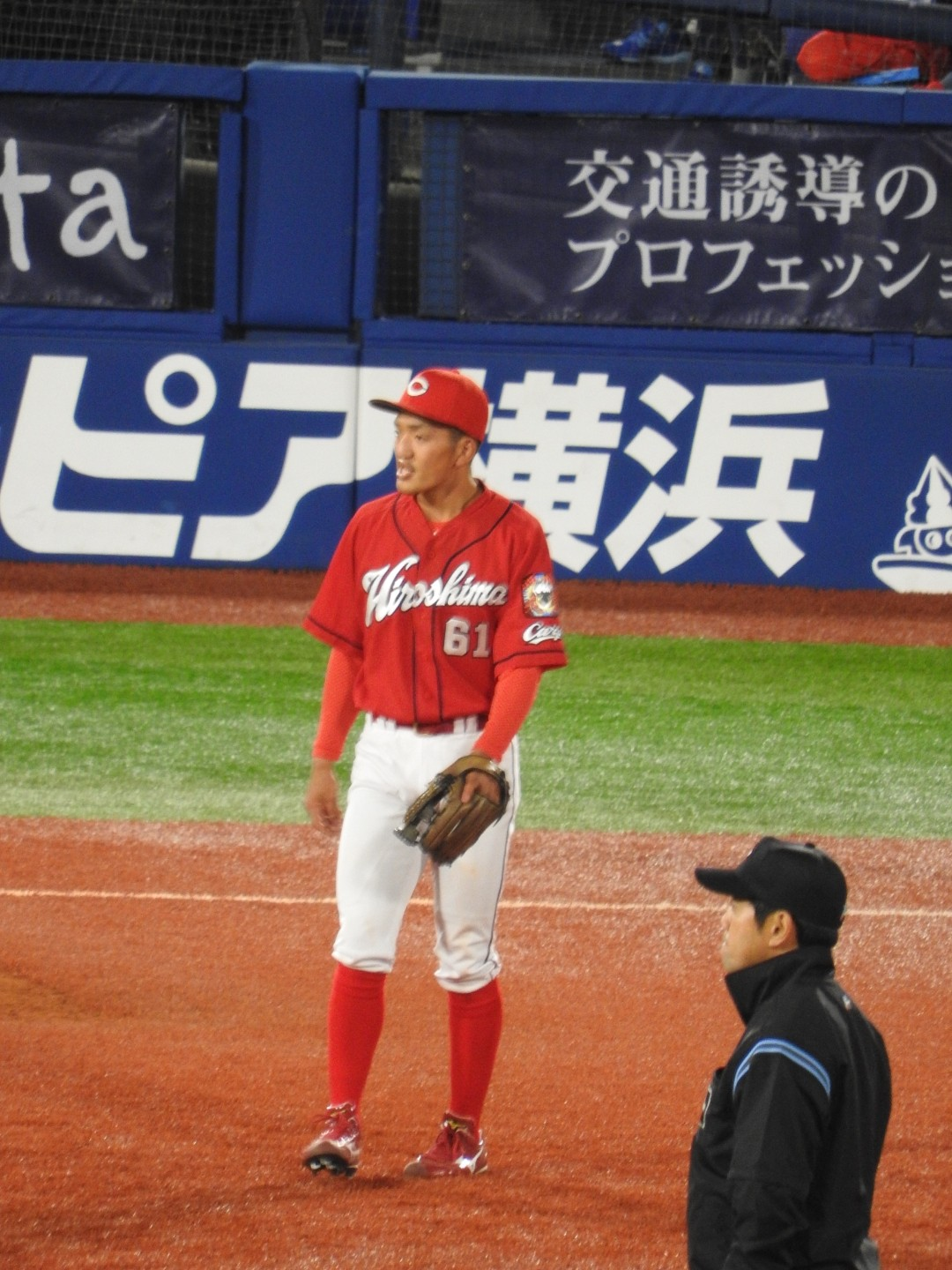

Hiroshima Toyo Carp – No. 4
- Infielder
- Born: December 16, 1998 (age 27); Osaka, Osaka, Japan
- Bats: Left Throws: Right

NPB debut
- March 26, 2021, for the Hiroshima Toyo Carp

NPB statistics (through 2025 season)
- Batting average: .227
- Hits: 206
- Home runs: 5
- Runs batted in: 65

Teams
- Hiroshima Toyo Carp (2021–present)

Career highlights and awards
- NPB All-Star (2025); Central League Golden Glove Award (2024)

Masaya Yano (矢野 雅哉, Yano Masaya; born December 16, 1998) is a Japanese professional baseball infielder for the Hiroshima Toyo Carp of Nippon Professional Baseball (NPB).
