= Yoshihiro Akahane =

Japanese baseball player (born 2000)

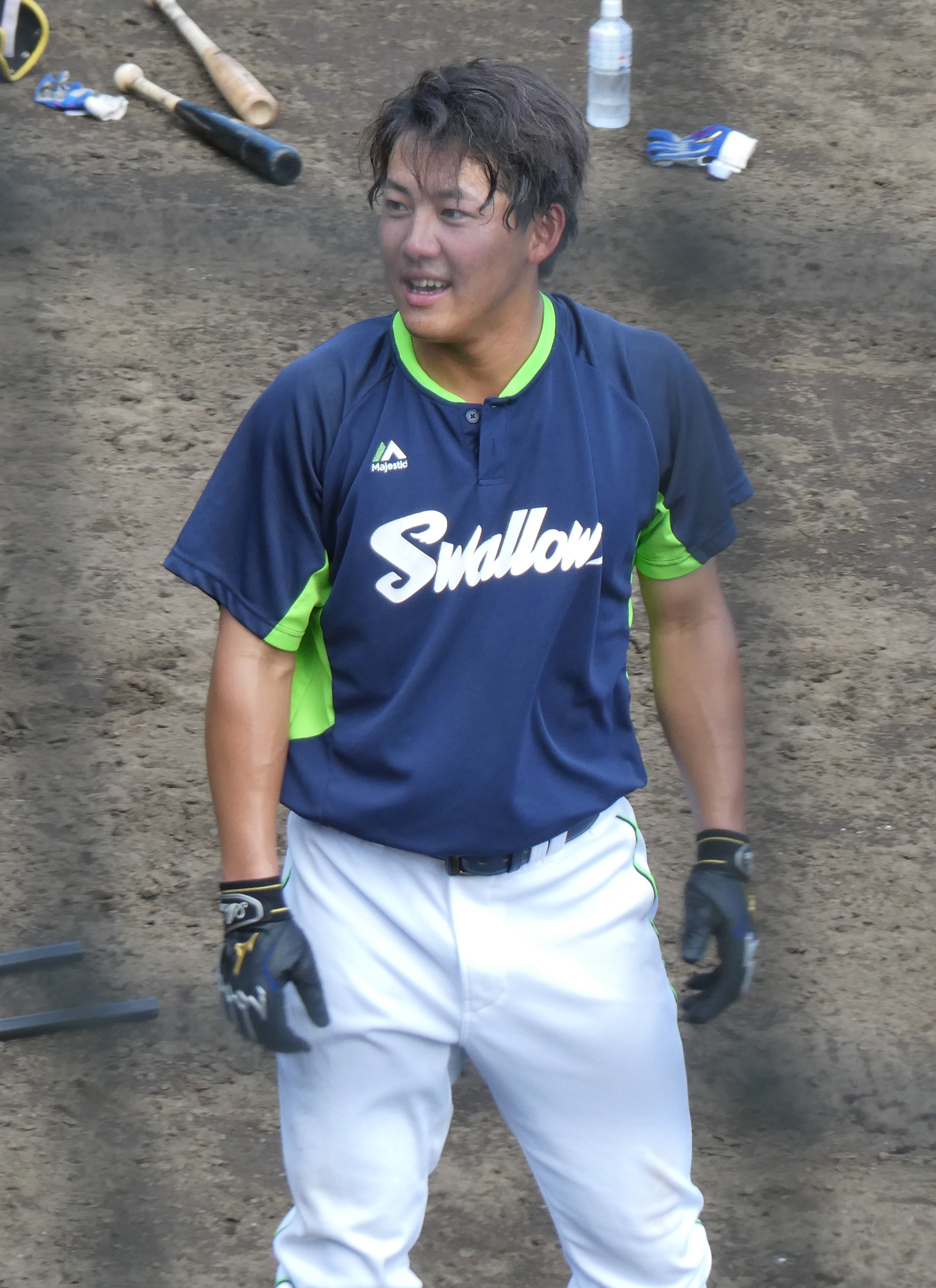

Tokyo Yakult Swallows – No. 00
- Infielder
- Born: June 29, 2000 (age 25); Matsumoto, Nagano, Japan
- Bats: Right Throws: Right

NPB debut
- August 6, 2022, for the Tokyo Yakult Swallows

Career statistics (through 2024 season)
- Batting average: .209
- Hits: 19
- Home runs: 3
- RBIs: 9
- Stolen bases: 4
- Stats at Baseball Reference

Teams
- Tokyo Yakult Swallows (2021–present)

Yoshihiro Akahane (赤羽 由紘, Akahane Yoshihiro; born June 29, 2000 in Matsumoto, Nagano, Japan) is a professional Japanese baseball player. He plays infielder for the Tokyo Yakult Swallows.
