= Tatsuya Ishikawa (baseball) =

Japanese baseball player (born 1998)

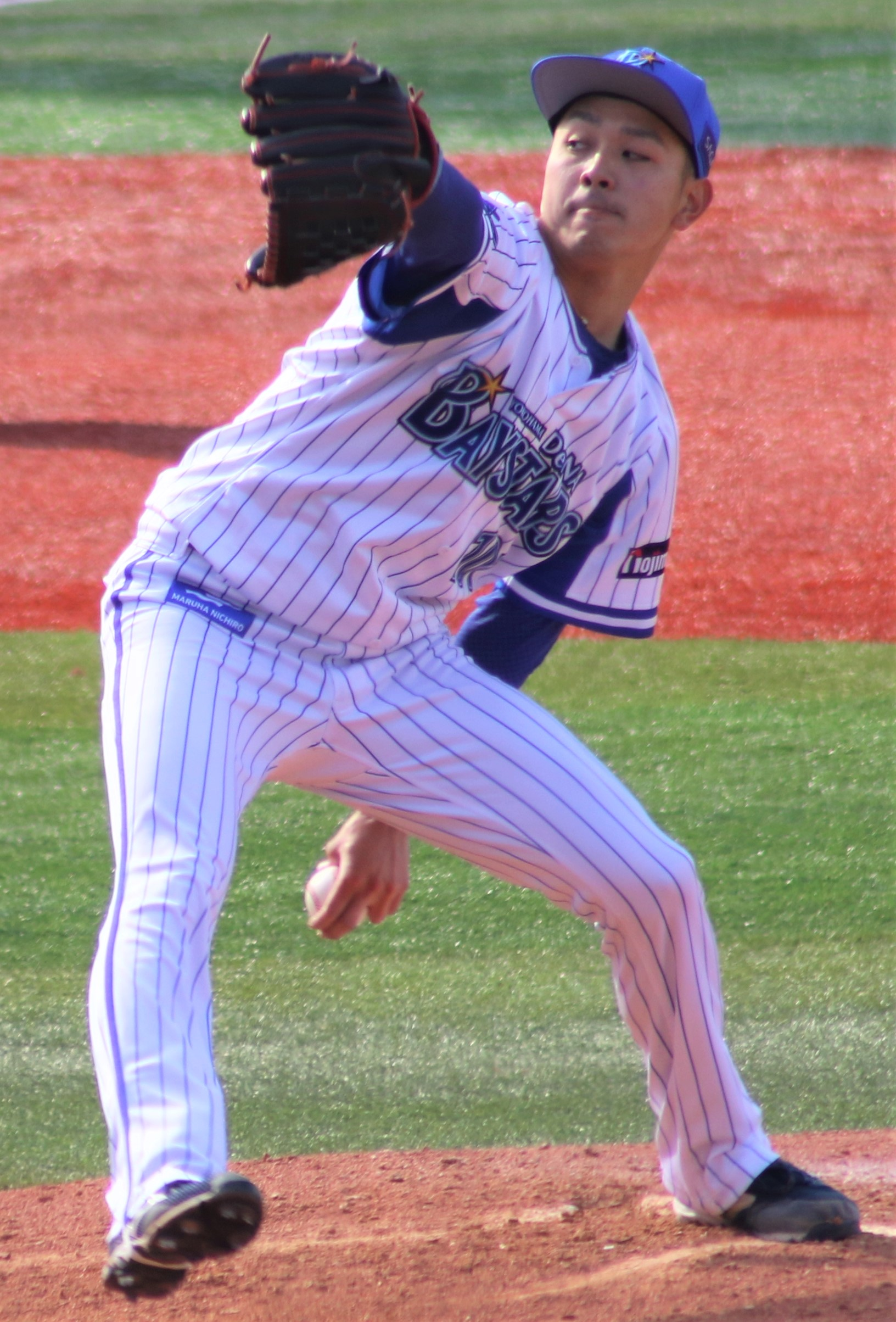

Yomiuri Giants – No. 65
- Pitcher
- Born: April 15, 1998 (age 27); Yokohama, Kanagawa, Japan
- Bats: Right Throws: Left

NPB debut
- July 14, 2022, for the Yokohama DeNA BayStars

Career statistics (through 2025 season)
- Win–loss record: 5–4
- Earned run average: 2.37
- Strikeouts: 91
- Saves: 0
- Holds: 8

Teams
- Yokohama DeNA BayStars (2021–2024); Yomiuri Giants (2025–present)

Tatsuya Ishikawa (石川 達也, Ishikawa Tatsuya; born April 15, 1998, in Yokohama, Kanagawa, Japan) is a professional Japanese baseball player. He is a pitcher for the Yomiuri Giants of Nippon Professional Baseball (NPB).
