= Kento Watanabe =

Japanese baseball player (born 1998)

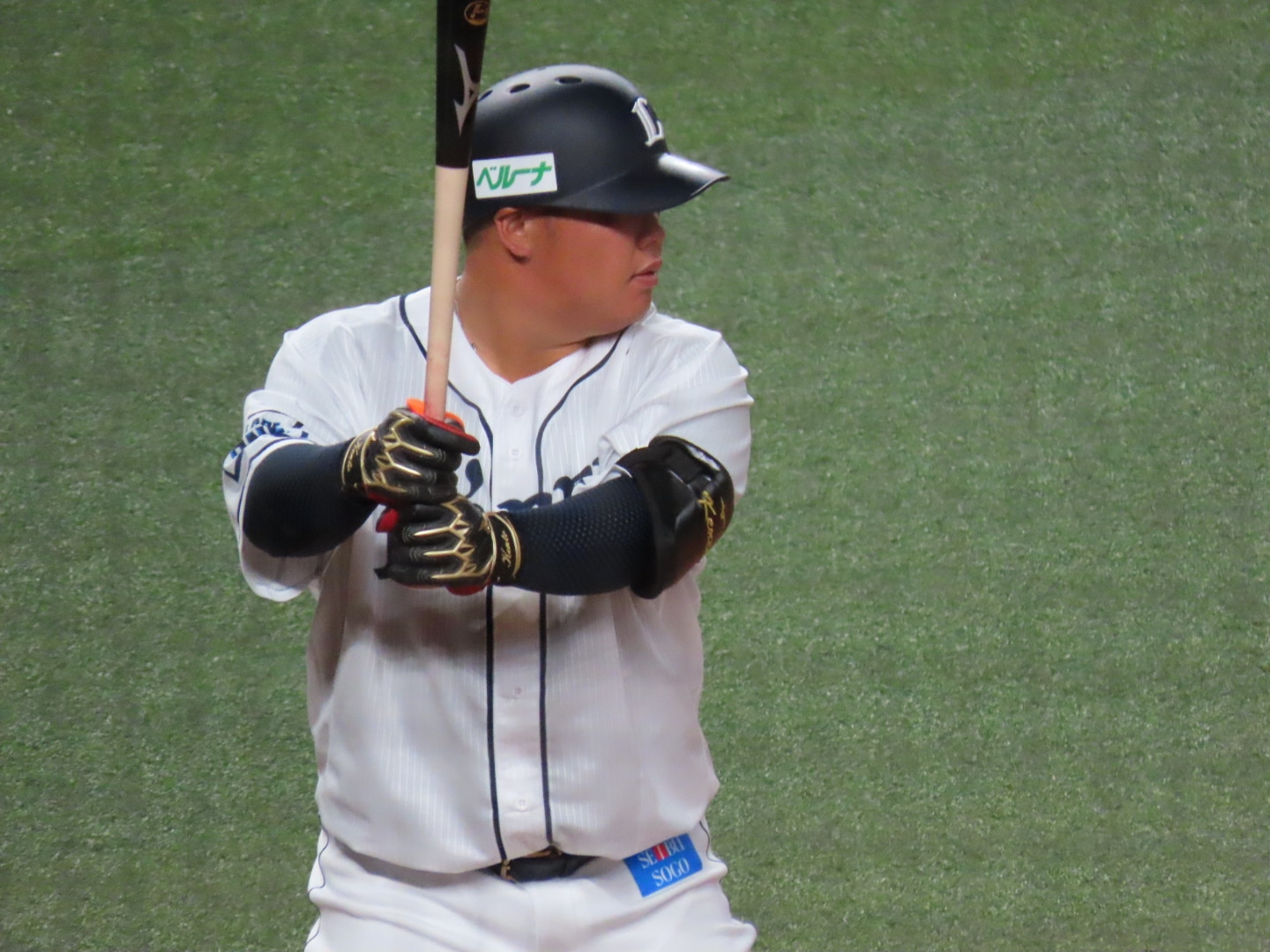

Saitama Seibu Lions – No. 66
- Infielder
- Born: December 26, 1998 (age 27); Yokohama, Kanagawa, Japan
- Bats: Right Throws: Right

NPB debut
- April 4, 2021, for the Saitama Seibu Lions

NPB statistics (through 2023 season)
- Batting average: .202
- Hits: 42
- Home runs: 7
- Runs batted in: 27
- Stolen base: 2
- Stats at Baseball Reference

Teams
- Saitama Seibu Lions (2021–present)

Kento Watanabe (渡部 健人, Watanabe Kento; born December 26, 1998) is a professional Japanese baseball player. He plays infielder for the Saitama Seibu Lions.
