= Shōta Maruyama =

Japanese baseball player (born 1998)

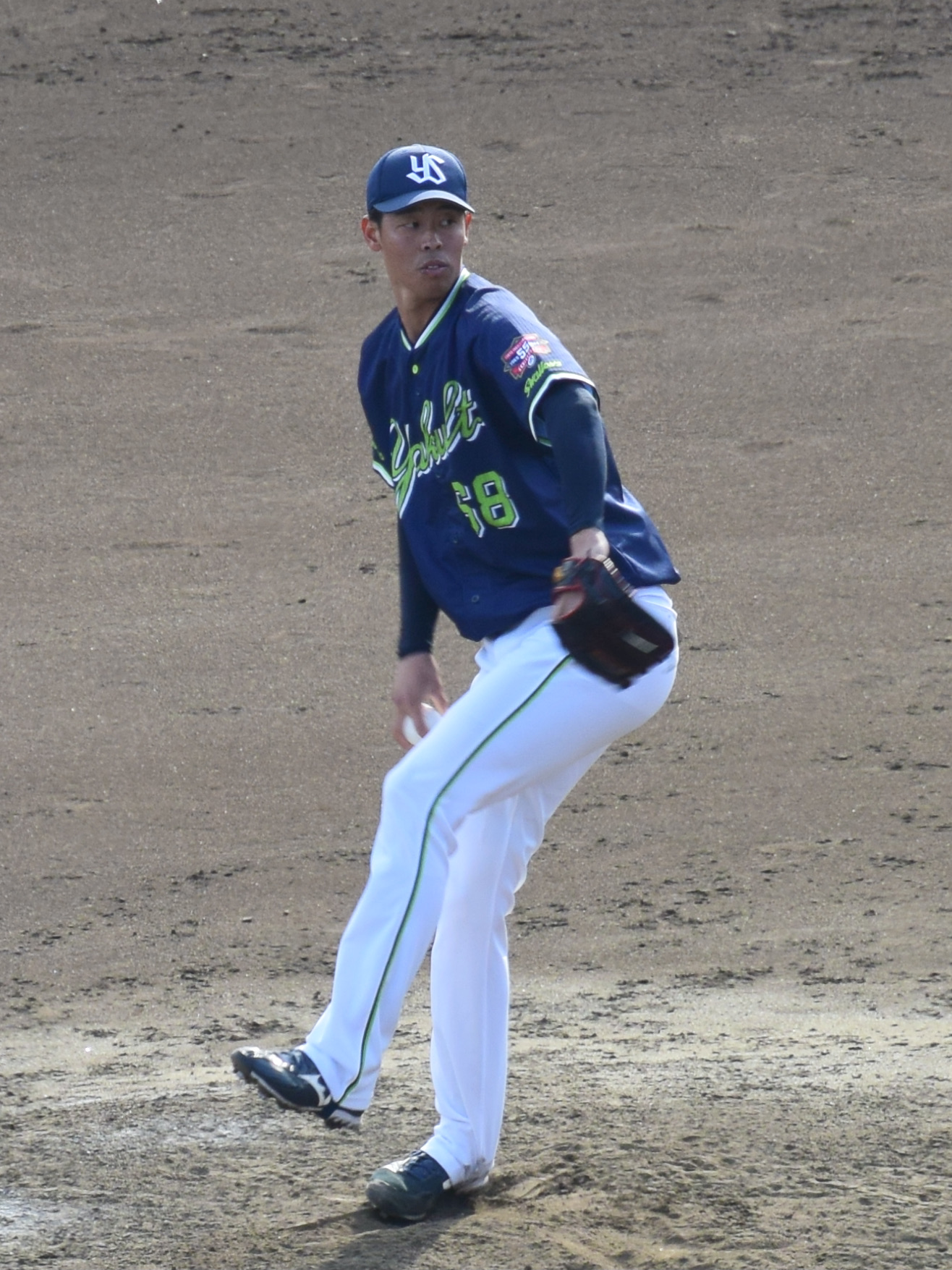

Tokyo Yakult Swallows – No. 68
- Pitcher
- Born: August 22, 1998 (age 27); Buzen, Fukuoka, Japan
- Bats: Left Throws: Right

NPB debut
- April 29, 2023, for the Tokyo Yakult Swallows

Career statistics (through 2024 season)
- Win–loss record: 1-0
- Earned Run Average: 2.17
- Strikeouts: 48
- Saves: 0
- Holds: 5
- Stats at Baseball Reference

Teams
- Tokyo Yakult Swallows (2021–present)

Shōta Maruyama (丸山 翔大, Maruyama Shōta; born January 19, 1998 in Adachi, Tokyo, Japan) is a professional Japanese baseball player. He plays pitcher for the Tokyo Yakult Swallows.
