= Natsuki Toda =

Japanese baseball player (born 2000)

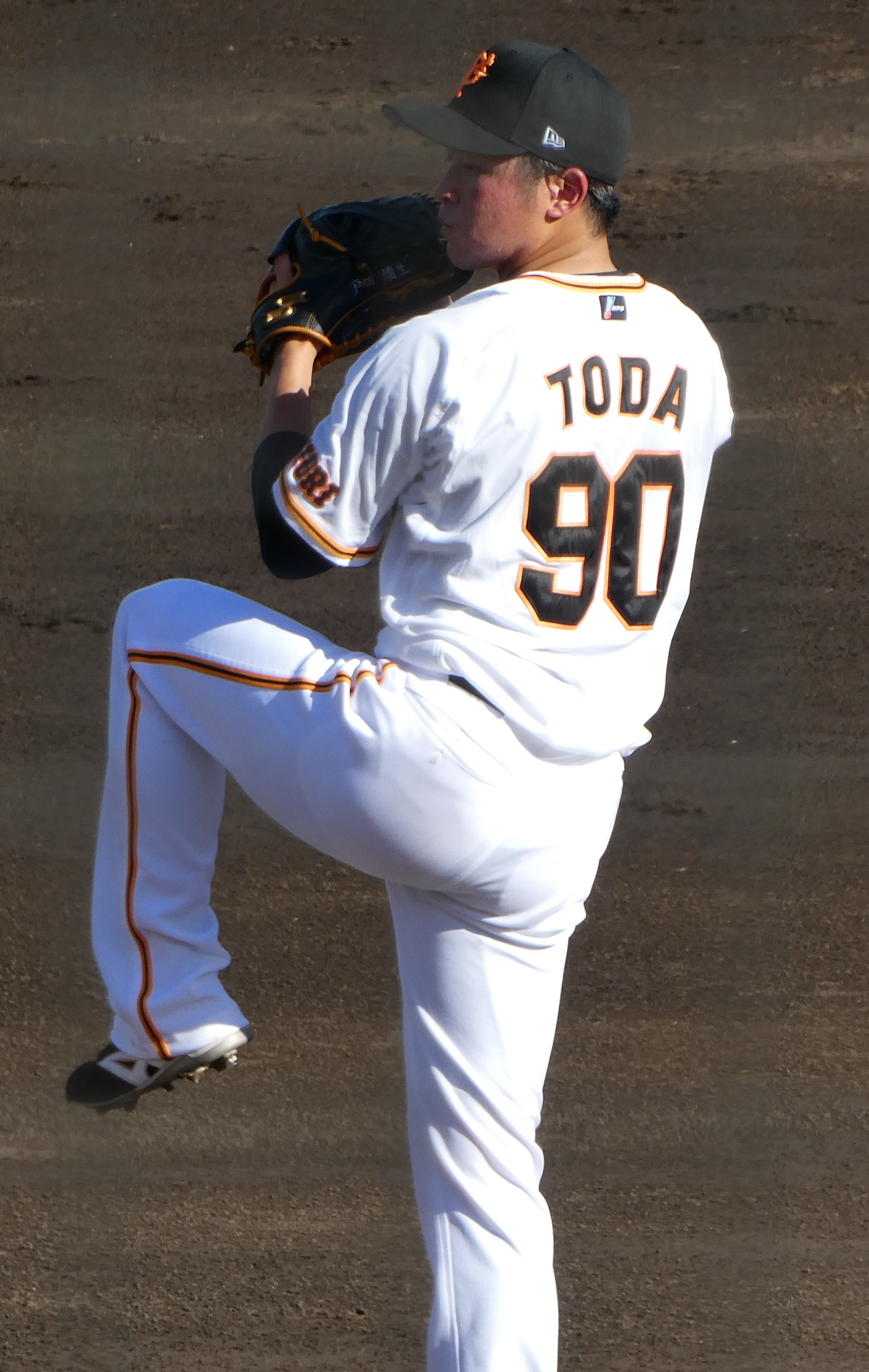
- Toda with the Yomiuri Giants

NC Dinos – No. 11
- Pitcher
- Born: July 22, 2000 (age 26); Takahama, Aichi, Japan
- Bats: Right Throws: Right

Professional debut
- NPB: June 18, 2021, for the Yomiuri Giants
- KBO: March 31, 2026, for the NC Dinos

NPB statistics (through 2025 season)
- Win–loss record: 1–1
- Earned run average: 5.53
- Strikeouts: 15

KBO statistics (through August 19, 2026)
- Win–loss record: 6-8
- Earned run average: 5.07
- Strikeouts: 85

Teams
- Yomiuri Giants (2021–2025); NC Dinos (2026–present)

Natsuki Toda (戸田懐生, Toda Natsuki; born July 22, 2000) is a Japanese professional baseball pitcher for the NC Dinos of the KBO League. He has previously played in Nippon Professional Baseball (NPB) for the Yomiuri Giants.

== Career ==
=== Yomiuri Giants ===
From 2021 to 2025, Toda played for the Yomiuri Giants of Nippon Professional Baseball. He made 19 appearances for the main club from 2021 to 2022, and 2025, compiling a 1-1 record and 5.53 ERA with 15 strikeouts across 27 2/3 innings pitched.

=== NC Dinos ===
On December 11, 2025, Toda signed with the NC Dinos of the KBO League.
