= Haruki Ohmichi =

Japanese baseball player (born 1996)

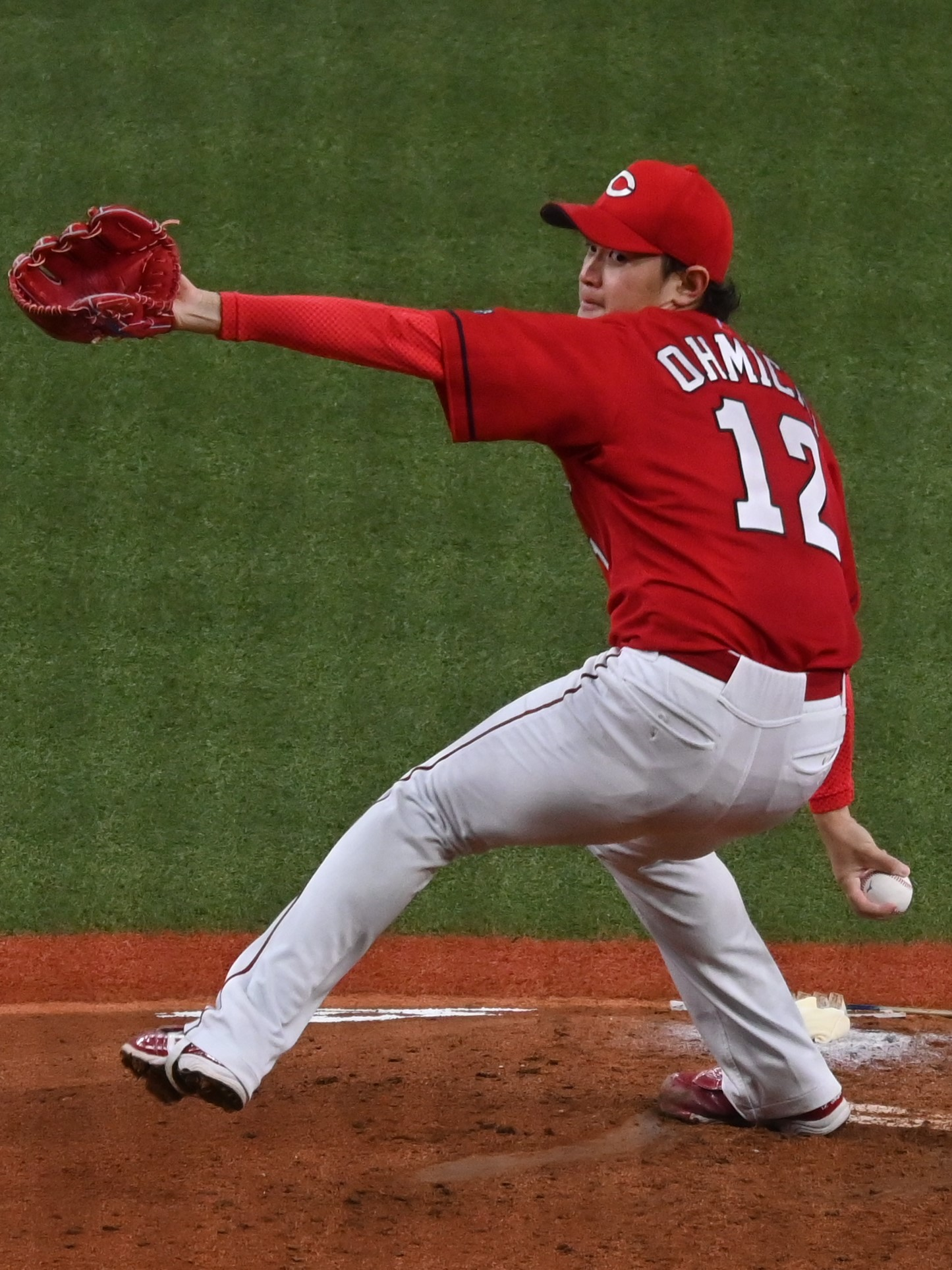

Tokyo Yakult Swallows – No. 46
- Pitcher
- Born: January 20, 1999 (age 27); Kawaguchi, Saitama, Japan
- Bats: Right Throws: Right

NPB debut
- March 31, 2021, for the Hiroshima Toyo Carp

Career statistics (through 2025 season)
- Win–loss record: 7-6
- Earned run average: 4.28
- Strikeouts: 96
- Saves: 0
- Holds: 13
- Stats at Baseball Reference

Teams
- Hiroshima Toyo Carp (2021–2025); Tokyo Yakult Swallows (2026–present)

Haruki Ohmichi (大道 温貴, Ohmichi Haruki; born July 9, 1996) is a professional Japanese baseball player. He plays pitcher for the Hiroshima Toyo Carp.
