= Shota Abe =

Japanese baseball player (born 1992)

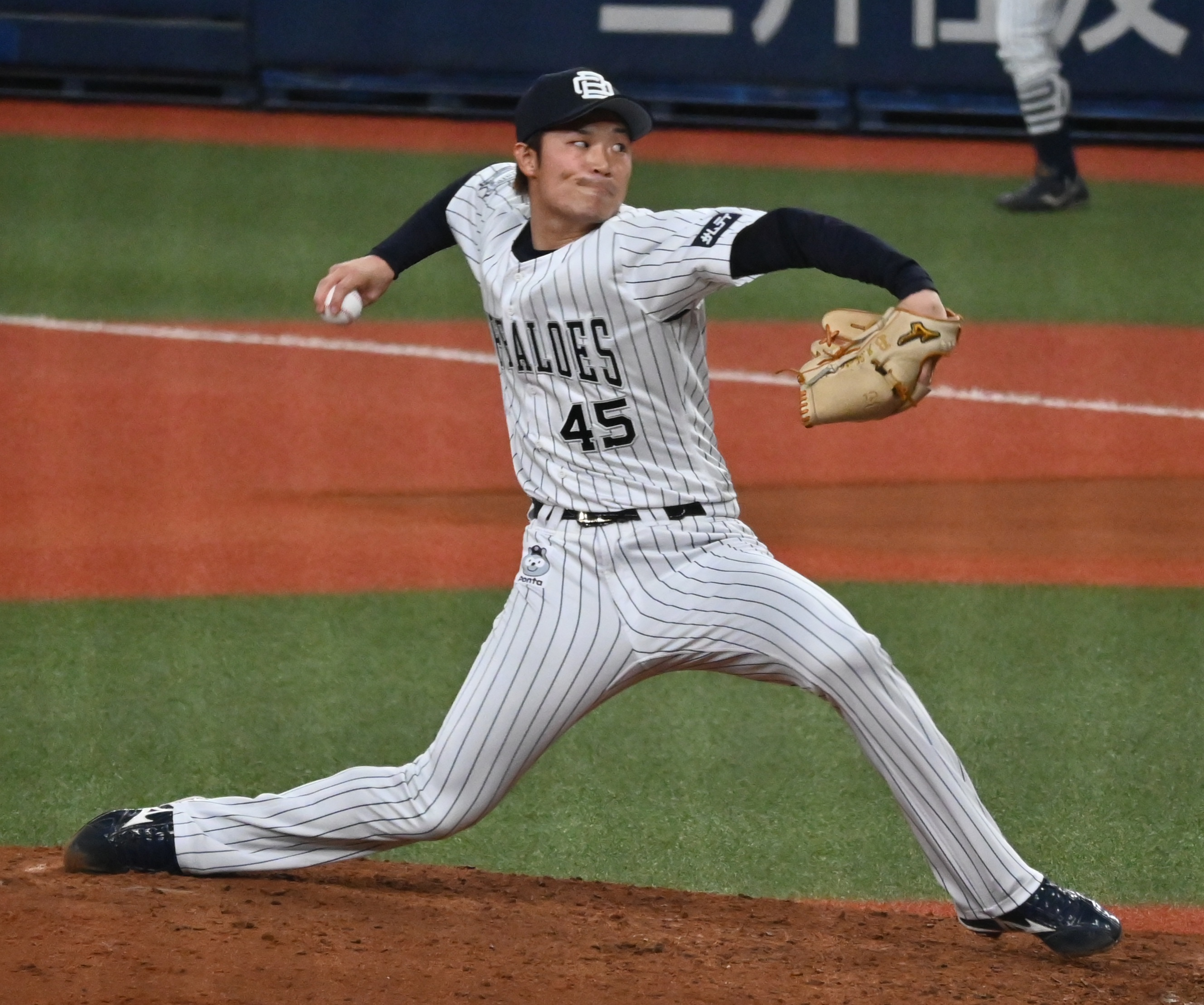

Orix Buffaloes – No. 20
- Pitcher
- Born: November 3, 1992 (age 33); Taishō-ku, Osaka, Japan
- Bats: Left Throws: Right

NPB debut
- April 30, 2021, for the Orix Buffaloes

Career statistics (through 2023 season)
- Win–loss record: 4-5
- Earned Run Average: 1.91
- Strikeouts: 87
- Saves: 4
- Holds: 43

Teams
- Orix Buffaloes (2021–present)

Career highlights and awards
- 1× Japan Series champion (2022)

Shota Abe (阿部 翔太, Abe Shota; born November 3, 1992 in Osaka, Osaka, Japan) is a professional Japanese baseball player. He plays pitcher for the Orix Buffaloes.
