= Yuma Imagawa =

Japanese baseball player (born 1997)

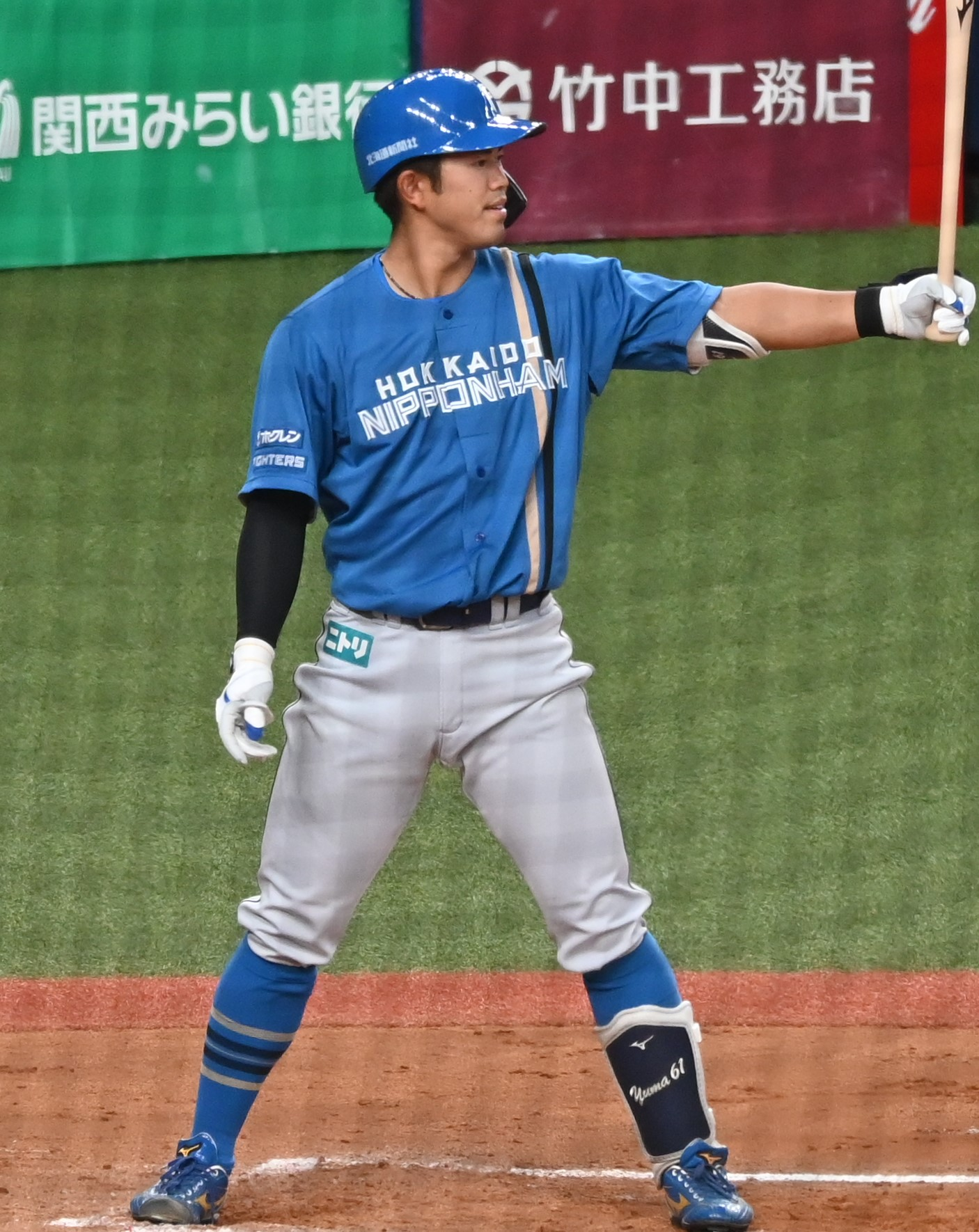

Hokkaido Nippon-Ham Fighters – No. 61
- Outfielder
- Born: January 25, 1997 (age 29); Sapporo, Japan
- Bats: Right Throws: Right

NPB debut
- April 16, 2021, for the Hokkaido Nippon-Ham Fighters

Career statistics (through 2022 season)
- Batting average: .213
- Home runs: 11
- RBIs: 41
- Stats at Baseball Reference

Teams
- Hokkaido Nippon-Ham Fighters (2022-present)

Yuma Imagawa (今川優馬, Imagawa Yuma; born January 25, 1997 in Sapporo, Hokkaido, Japan) is a professional Japanese baseball player. He is an outfielder for the Hokkaido Nippon-Ham Fighters of Nippon Professional Baseball (NPB).
