= Taichi Yamano =

Japanese baseball player (born 1999)

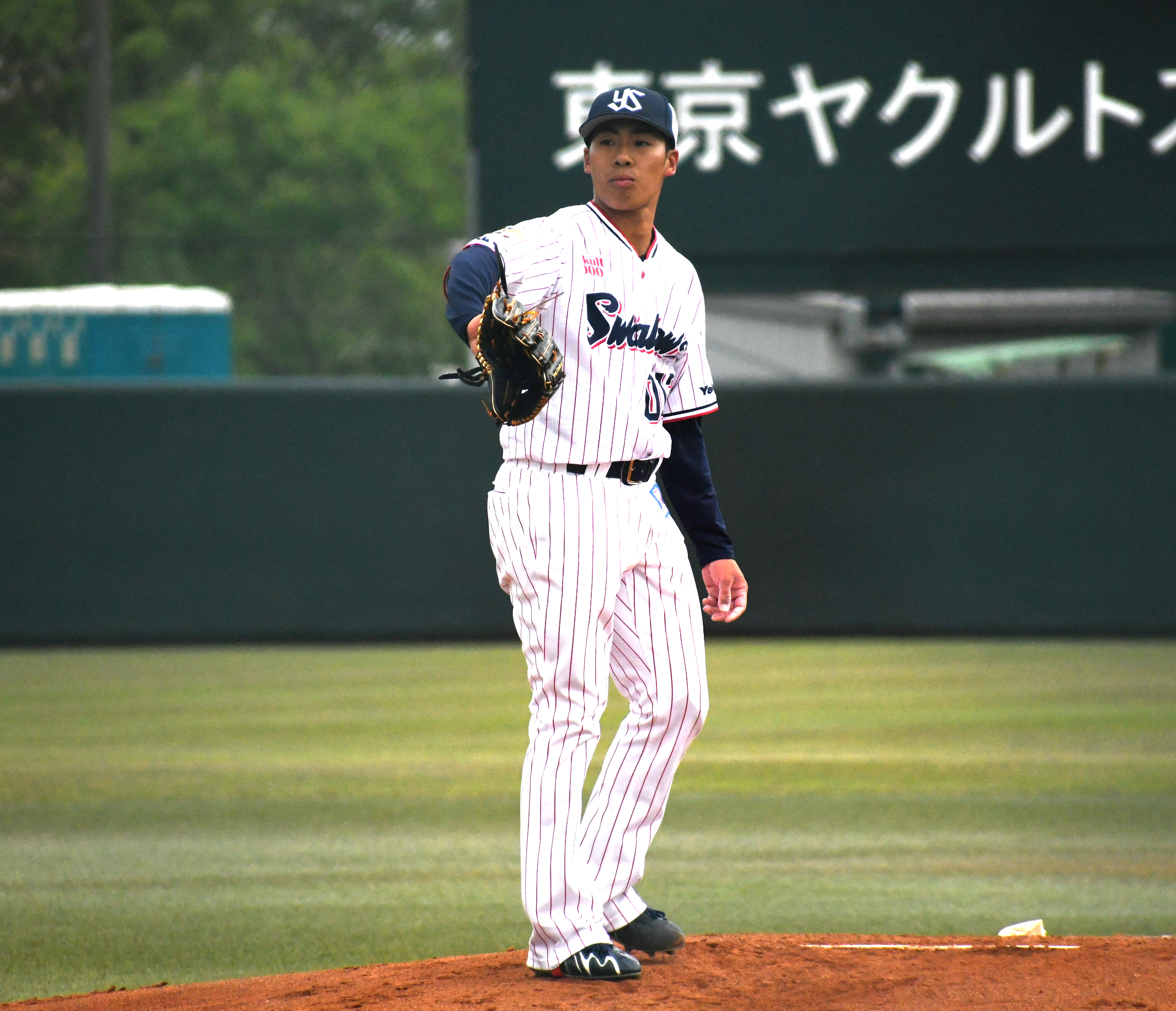

Tokyo Yakult Swallows – No. 26
- Pitcher
- Born: March 24, 1999 (age 27); Yamaguchi, Yamaguchi, Japan
- Bats: Left Throws: Left

NPB debut
- April 1, 2021, for the Tokyo Yakult Swallows

Career statistics (through 2024 season)
- Win–loss record: 4-7
- Earned Run Average: 6.14
- Strikeouts: 50
- Saves: 0
- Holds: 0
- Stats at Baseball Reference

Teams
- Tokyo Yakult Swallows (2021–present)

Career highlights and awards
- Japan Series champion (2021); NPB All-Star (2026)

Taichi Yamano (山野 太一, Yamano Taichi; born March 24, 1999 in Yamaguchi, Chiba, Japan) is a professional Japanese baseball player. He plays pitcher for the Tokyo Yakult Swallows.
