= Daisuke Moriura =

Japanese baseball player (born 1998)

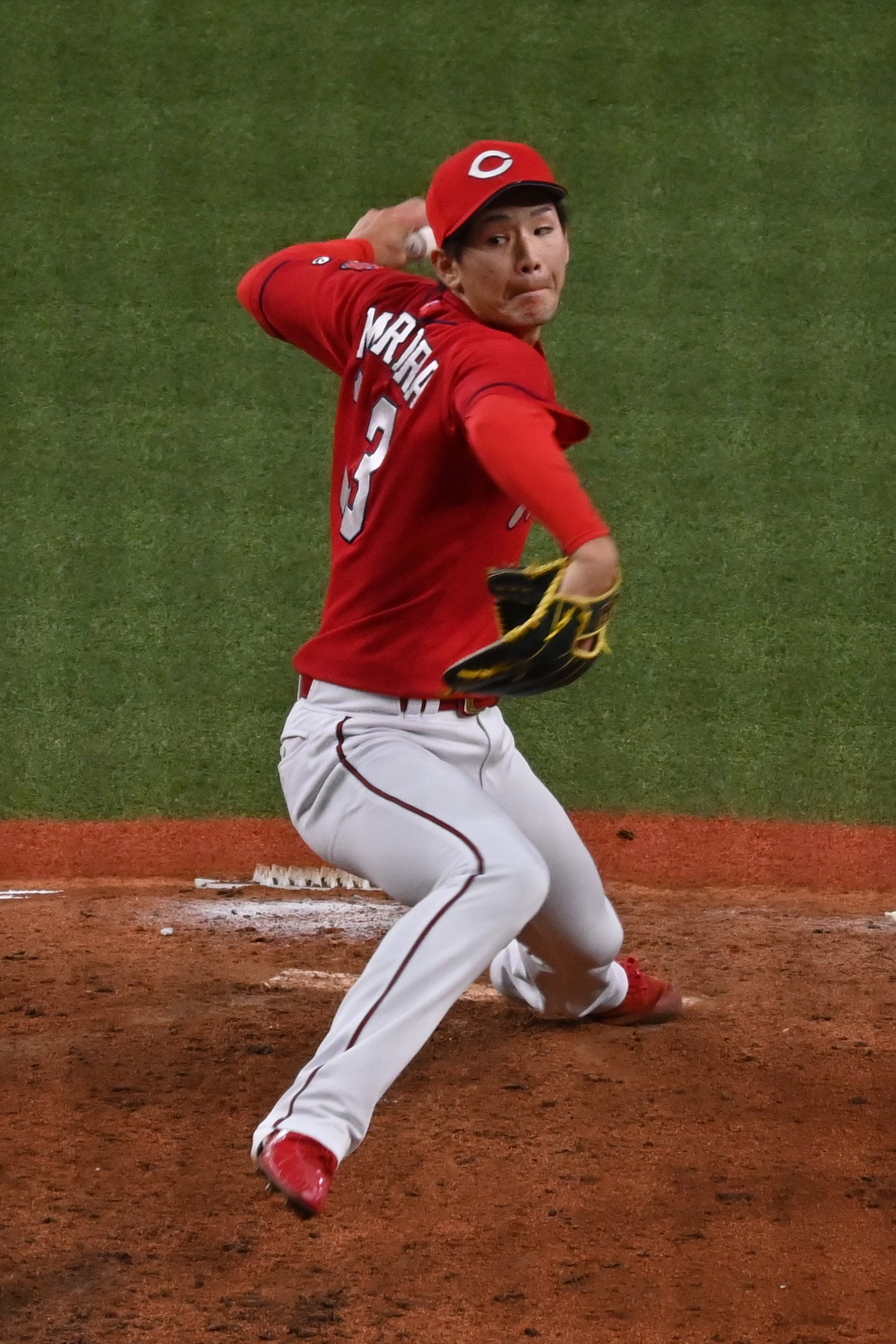

Hiroshima Toyo Carp – No. 13
- Pitcher
- Born: June 15, 1998 (age 28); Shingū, Wakayama, Japan
- Bats: Left Throws: Left

NPB debut
- March 27, 2021, for the Hiroshima Toyo Carp

NPB statistics (through 2025 season)
- Win–loss record: 10–12
- Earned run average: 2.81
- Strikeouts: 200
- Stats at Baseball Reference

Teams
- Hiroshima Toyo Carp (2021–present)

Career highlights and awards
- NPB All-Star (2025)

Daisuke Moriura (森浦 大輔, Moriura Daisuke; born June 15, 1998) is a Japanese professional baseball pitcher for the Hiroshima Toyo Carp of Nippon Professional Baseball (NPB).

== Career ==
On June 1, 2024, in a game against the Fukuoka SoftBank Hawks, Moriura recorded an immaculate inning.
