= Shoma Sato (baseball, born 1998) =

Japanese baseball player (born 1998)

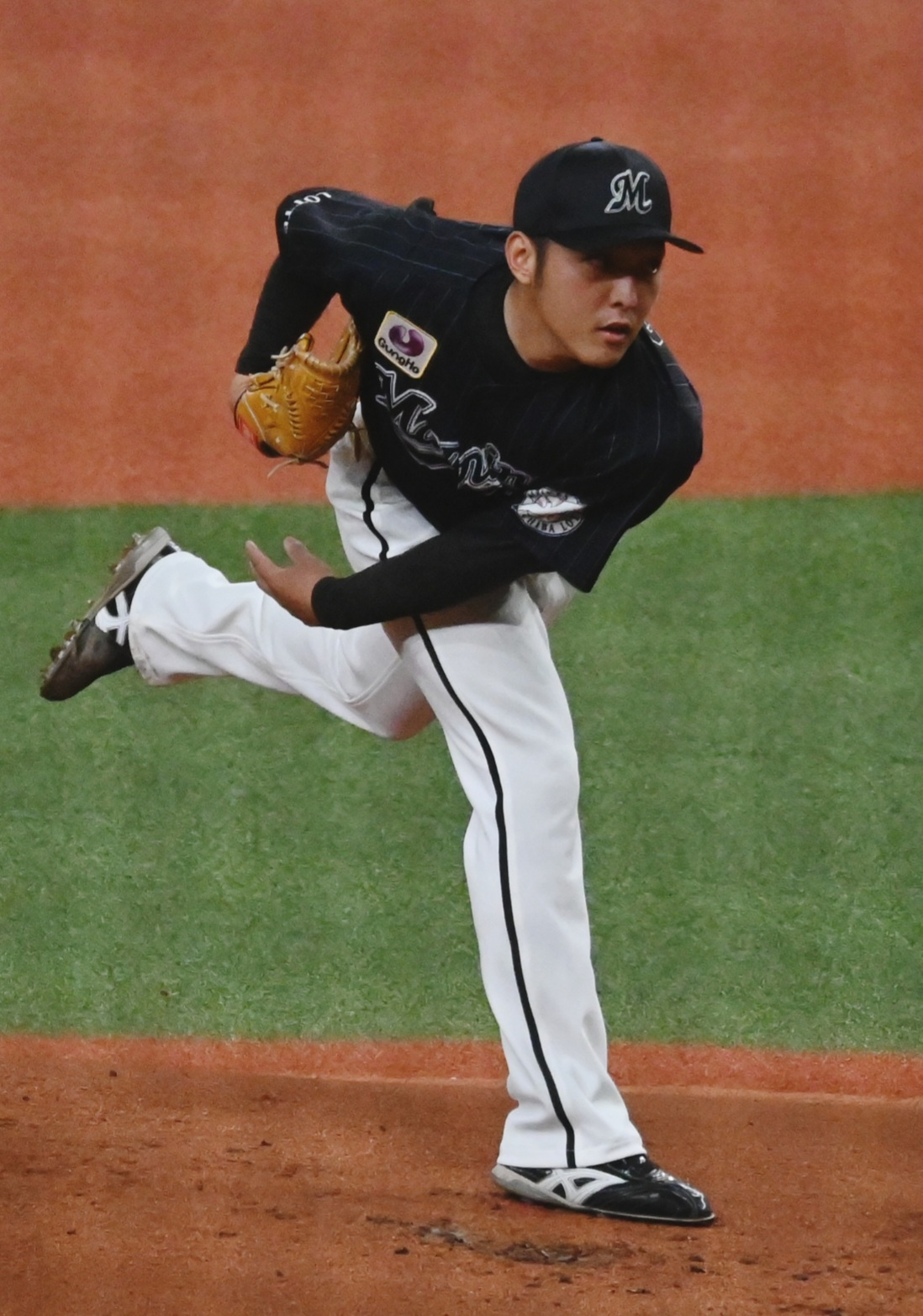

Chiba Lotte Marines – No. 64
- Pitcher
- Born: June 2, 1998 (age 28); Sumida, Tokyo, Japan
- Bats: Left Throws: Left

NPB debut
- March 31, 2022, for the Chiba Lotte Marines

Career statistics (through 2022 season)
- Win-loss record: 2-6
- Earned run average: 4.64
- Strikeouts: 28
- Holds: 0
- Saves: 0
- Stats at Baseball Reference

Teams
- Chiba Lotte Marines (2022-present)

Shoma Sato (佐藤 奨真, Sato Shoma; born June 2, 1998 in Sumida, Tokyo, Japan) is a professional Japanese baseball player. He is a pitcher for the Chiba Lotte Marines of Nippon Professional Baseball (NPB).
