= 2018 Nippon Professional Baseball draft =

2018 Nippon Professional Baseball Draft
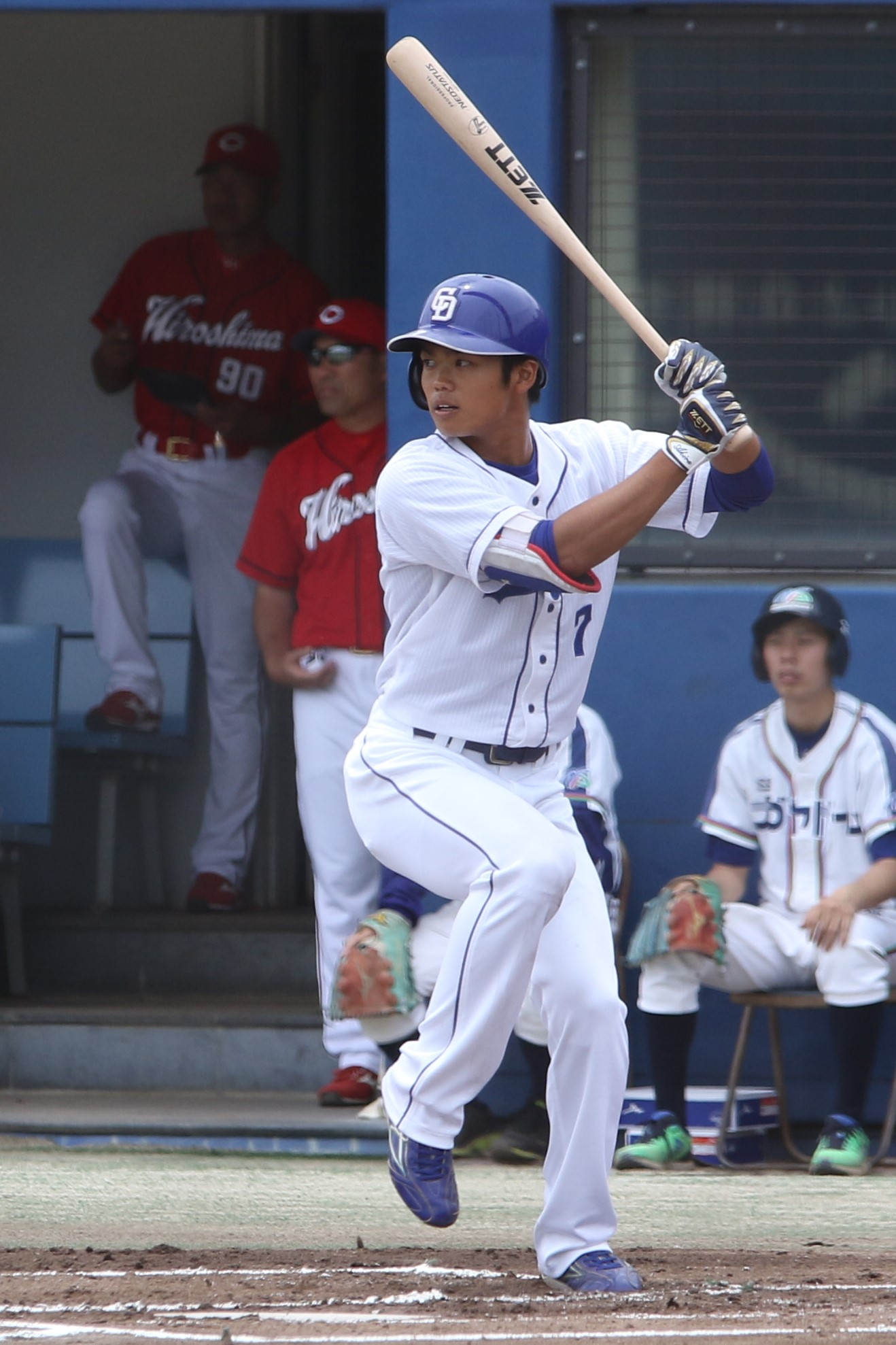
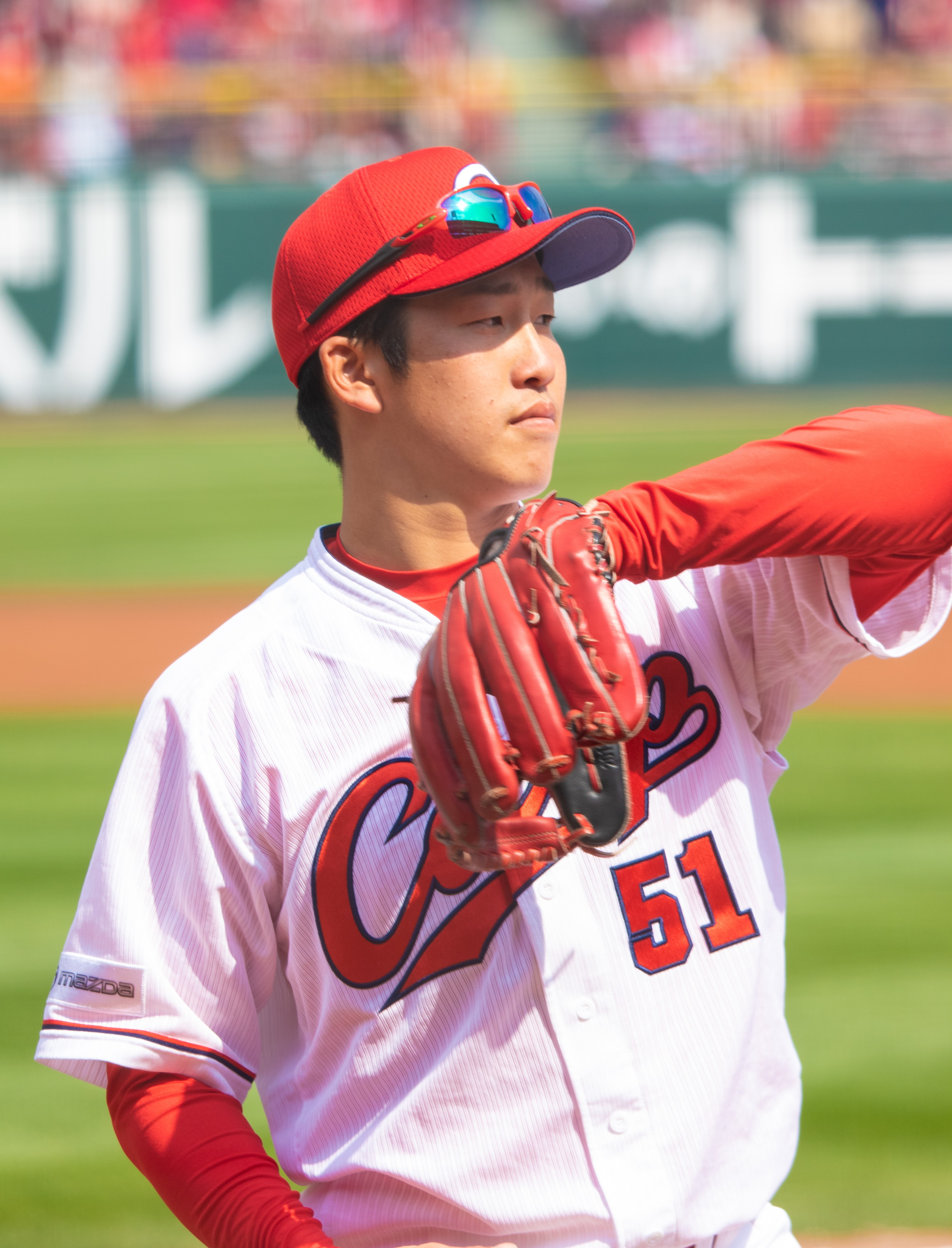
- Akira Neo and Kaito Kozono, who was nominated and a bid lottery for by four teams.

General information
- Sport: Baseball
- Date: October 25, 2018
- Location: Grand Prince Hotel Takanawa, Tokyo
- Networks: TBS (first round), sky-A
- Sponsored by: Taisho Pharmaceutical

Overview
- 104 total selections in 12 (Includes draft for developmental players) rounds
- League: Nippon Professional Baseball
- First round selections: Akira Neo; Kaito Kozono; Kyota Fujiwara

The 2018 Nippon Professional Baseball (NPB) Draft was held on October 25, 2018, for the 54th time at the Grand Prince Hotel Takanawa to assign amateur baseball players to the NPB. It was arranged with the special cooperation of Taisho Pharmaceutical Co. with official naming rights. The draft was officially called "The Professional Baseball Draft Meeting supported by Lipovitan D". 2018 marked the 6th consecutive year in which Taisho Pharmaceuticals had sponsored the event.

== Summary ==
Only the first round picks were allowed to be contested with all picks from the second round onward being based on table placing in the 2018 NPB season in a waiver system. Waiver priority was based on inter-league results. As the Pacific League teams came out on top against Central League opposition, Pacific League teams were given preference. From the third round the order was reversed continuing in the same fashion until all picks were exhausted.

== First round Contested Picks ==
	Player name	Position	Teams selected by
First round	**Akira Neo**	Infielder	**Dragons**, Fighters, Giants, Swallows
First round	**Kaito Kozono**	Infielder	Buffaloes, Baystars, Hawks, **Carp**
First round	**Kyota Fujiwara**	Outfielder	Eagles, **Marines**, Tigers
Second round	**Ryosuke Tatsumi**	Outfielder	**Eagles**, Tigers, Giants, Hawks
Second round	**Taiga Kamichatani**	Pitcher	**Baystars**, Swallows

- **Bolded** teams indicate who won the right to negotiate contract following a lottery.
- In the first round, **Wataru Matsumoto** (Pitcher) was selected by the **Lions** without a bid lottery.
- In the second round, **Ryo Ohta** (Infielder) was selected by the **Buffaloes** without a bid lottery.
- In the thrird round, **Koji Chikamoto** (Outfielder) was selected by the **Tigers**, **Yuki Takahashi** (Pitcher) by the **Giants** ,**Hiroshi Kaino** (Pitcher) by the **Hawks**, and **Noboru Shimizu** (Pitcher) by the **Swallows** without a bid lottery.
- List of selected players.

== Selected Players ==
Key
*	Player did not sign

- The order of the teams is the order of second round waiver priority.
- **Bolded** After that, a developmental player who contracted as a registered player under control.
- List of selected players.

=== Tohoku Rakuten Golden Eagles ===
Pick	Player name	Position	Team
#1	Ryosuke Tatsumi	Outfielder	Ritsumeikan University
#2	Hikaru Ohta	Catcher	Osaka University of Commerce
#3	Shoichiro Hikiji	Pitcher	Kureshiki Commercial High School
#4	Hayato Yuge	Pitcher	Subaru
#5	Tomoki Satoh	Pitcher	Yamagata Chuo High School
#6	Yoshiaki Watanabe	Infielder	Meiji University
#7	Yuta Ogo	Pitcher	Rissho University
#8	Sora Suzuki	Pitcher	Fuji University
Developmental Player Draft
#1	Kotaro Seimiya	Pitcher	Yachiyo Shōin High School
#2	Yoshiki Norimoto	Pitcher	Yamagishi Logisters

=== Hanshin Tigers ===
Pick	Player name	Position	Team
#1	Koji Chikamoto	Outfielder	Osaka Gas
#2	Ryuhei Obata	Infielder	Nobeoka Gakuen High School
#3	Seiya Kinami	Infielder	Honda
#4	Yukiya Saitoh	Pitcher	Honda
#5	Riku Kawahara	Pitcher	Sōseikan High School
#6	Atsuki Yuasa	Pitcher	Tōyama GRN Thunderbirds
Developmental Player Draft
#1	**Yuya Katayama**	Catcher	Fukui Wild Raptors

=== Chiba Lotte Marines ===
Pick	Player name	Position	Team
#1	Kyota Fujiwara	Outfielder	Osaka Tōin High School
#2	Yusuke Azuma	Pitcher	Nippon Sport Science University
#3	Kazuya Ojima	Pitcher	Waseda University
#4	Koki Yamaguchi	Outfielder	Meiō High School
#5	Toshiya Nakamura	Pitcher	Asia University
#6	Takuro Furuya	Pitcher	Narashino High School
#7	Shin Matsuda	Pitcher	Honda
#8	Hideto Doi	Pitcher	Matsuyama Seiryō High School
Developmental Player Draft
#1	Mizuki Kamata	Pitcher	Tokushima Indigo Socks

=== Chunichi Dragons ===
Pick	Player name	Position	Team
#1	Akira Neo	Infielder	Osaka Tōin High School
#2	Kodai Umetsu	Pitcher	Toyo University
#3	Akiyoshi Katsuno	Pitcher	Mitsubishi Heavy Industries
#4	Kota Ishibashi	Catcher	Kantō Daiichi High School
#5	Kenshin Kakikoshi	Pitcher	Yamanashi Gakuin High School
#6	Kaname Takino	Outfielder	Osaka University of Commerce

=== Orix Buffaloes ===
Pick	Player name	Position	Team
#1	Ryo Ohta	Infielder	Tenri High School
#2	Yuma Tongu	Catcher	Asia University
#3	Yudai Aranishi	Pitcher	Honda Kumamoto
#4	Ryoga Tomiyama	Pitcher	Toyota
#5	Sho Gibo	Catcher	Mirai Okinawa High School
#6	Yu Hidarisawa	Pitcher	JX-ENEOS
#7	Keita Nakagawa	Infielder	Toyo University
Developmental Player Draft
#1	**Taisei Urushihara**	Pitcher	Niigata University of Health and Welfare

=== Yokohama DeNA Baystars ===
Pick	Player name	Position	Team
#1	Taiga Kamichatani	Pitcher	Toyo University
#2	Yukiya Itoh	Infielder	Rissho University
#3	Shinichi Ohnuki	Pitcher	Nippon Steel Kashima
#4	Atsushi Katsumata	Pitcher	Nihon University Tsurugaoka High School
#5	Kyosuke Mashiko	Catcher	Seirantaitō High School
#6	Naoto Chino	Infielder	Niigata Albirex BC
Developmental Player Draft
#1	**Daita Miyagi**	Pitcher	Shiga Gakuen High School

=== Hokkaido Nippon-Ham Fighters ===
Pick	Player name	Position	Team
#1	Kosei Yoshida	Pitcher	Kanaashi Agricultural High School
#2	Yuki Nomura	Infielder	Hanasakitokuharu High School
#3	Tsubasa Nabatame	Pitcher	Nippon Express
#4	Chusei Mannami	Outfielder	Yokohama High School
#5	Ren Kakigi	Pitcher	Osaka Tōin High School
#6	Yua Tamiya	Catcher	Narita High School
#7	Suguru Fukuda	Pitcher	Seisa Dohto University
Developmental Player Draft
#1	Kazuyoshi Ebina	Outfielder	Tōyama GRN Thunderbirds

=== Yomiuri Giants ===
Pick	Player name	Position	Team
#1	Yuki Takahashi	Pitcher	Hachinohe Gakuin University
#2	Riku Masuda	Infielder	Meishū Gakuen Hitachi High School
#3	Daisuke Naoe	Pitcher	Matsushō Gakuen High School
#4	Kai Yokogawa	Pitcher	Osaka Tōin High School
#5	Yoshiya Matsui	Infielder	Orio Aishin High School
#6	Shosei Togo	Pitcher	Seishin Ursula Gakuen High School
Developmental Player Draft
#1	**Kota Yamashita**	Outfielder	Takasaki University of Health and Welfare High School
#2	Kaisei Hirai	Pitcher	Gifu Daiichi High School
#3	**Shohei Numata**	Pitcher	Asahikawa University High School
#4	Hibiki Kuroda	Infielder	Tsuruga Kehi High School

=== Fukuoka SoftBank Hawks ===
Pick	Player name	Position	Team
#1	Hiroshi Kaino	Pitcher	Toyo University
#2	Kazuki Sugiyama	Pitcher	Mitsubishi Heavy Industries Hiroshima
#3	Daiju Nomura	Infielder	Waseda Jikkyo High School
#4	Yugo Bandoh	Pitcher	JR East
#5	Shun Mizutani	Outfielder	Iwami Chisuikan High School
#6	Keisuke Izumi	Pitcher	Kanazawa Seiryo University
#7	Masato Okumura	Pitcher	Mitsubishi Hitachi Power Systems
Developmental Player Draft
#1	**Riku Watanabe**	Catcher	Kokugakuin University
#2	Naoya Okamoto	Pitcher	Tokyo University of Agriculture Hokkaido Okhotsk
#3	Tomoaki Shigeta	Pitcher	Kokushikan University
#4	Takamasa Nakamura	Outfielder	Nishi-Nippon Junior College High School

=== Tokyo Yakult Swallows ===
Pick	Player name	Position	Team
#1	Noboru Shimizu	Pitcher	Kokugakuin University
#2	Shōta Nakayama	Outfielder	Hosei University
#3	Yuta Ichikawa	Pitcher	Meitoku Gijuku High School
#4	Taiki Hamada	Outfielder	Meihō High School
#5	Koshiro Sakamoto	Pitcher	Nippon Steel Hirohata
#6	Yuta Suzuki	Pitcher	Nihon Bunri High School
#7	Yuto Kanakubo	Catcher	Kyushu Kyoritsu University
#8	Taisei Yoshida	Infielder	Meiji Yasuda Life
Developmental Player Draft
#1	Taishi Uchiyama	Catcher	Tochigi Golden Braves
#2	**Yu Matsumoto**	Infielder	Fukui Wild Raptors

=== Saitama Seibu Lions ===
Pick	Player name	Position	Team
#1	Wataru Matsumoto	Pitcher	Nippon Sport Science University
#2	Yutaro Watanabe	Pitcher	Urawa Gakuin High School
#3	Kakeru Yamanobe	Infielder	Mitsubishi Motors Okazaki
#4	Kaito Awatsu	Pitcher	Higashi Nippon International University
#5	Shoya Makino	Catcher	Yū Gakkan High School
#6	Ryosuke Moriwaki	Pitcher	Sega Sammy
#7	Ryusei Satoh	Infielder	Fuji University
Developmenalt Player Draft
#1	Aoi Tohno	Pitcher	Japan University of Economics
#2	Jiyu Ohkubo	Pitcher	Hokkai High School
#3	**Daichi Nakaguma**	Catcher	Tokuyama University

=== Hiroshima Toyo Carp ===
Pick	Player name	Position	Team
#1	Kaito Kozono	Infielder	Hōtoku Gakuen High School
#2	Sotaro Shimauchi	Pitcher	Kyushu Kyoritsu University
#3	Kota Hayashi	Infielder	Chiben Gakuen Wakayama High School
#4	Takuto Nakagami	Infielder	Gifu Commercial High School
#5	Norihiko Tanaka	Pitcher	Komono High School
#6	Yuya Shozui	Outfielder	Asia University
#7	Ryutaro Hatsuki	Infielder	Kamimura Gakuen High School
Developmental Player Draft
#1	**Minoru Ohmori**	Outfielder	Shizuoka Sangyo University

Preceded by 2017	Nippon Professional Baseball draft	Succeeded by 2019
