= Akira Neo =

Japanese baseball player (born 2000)

Akira Neo 根尾昂
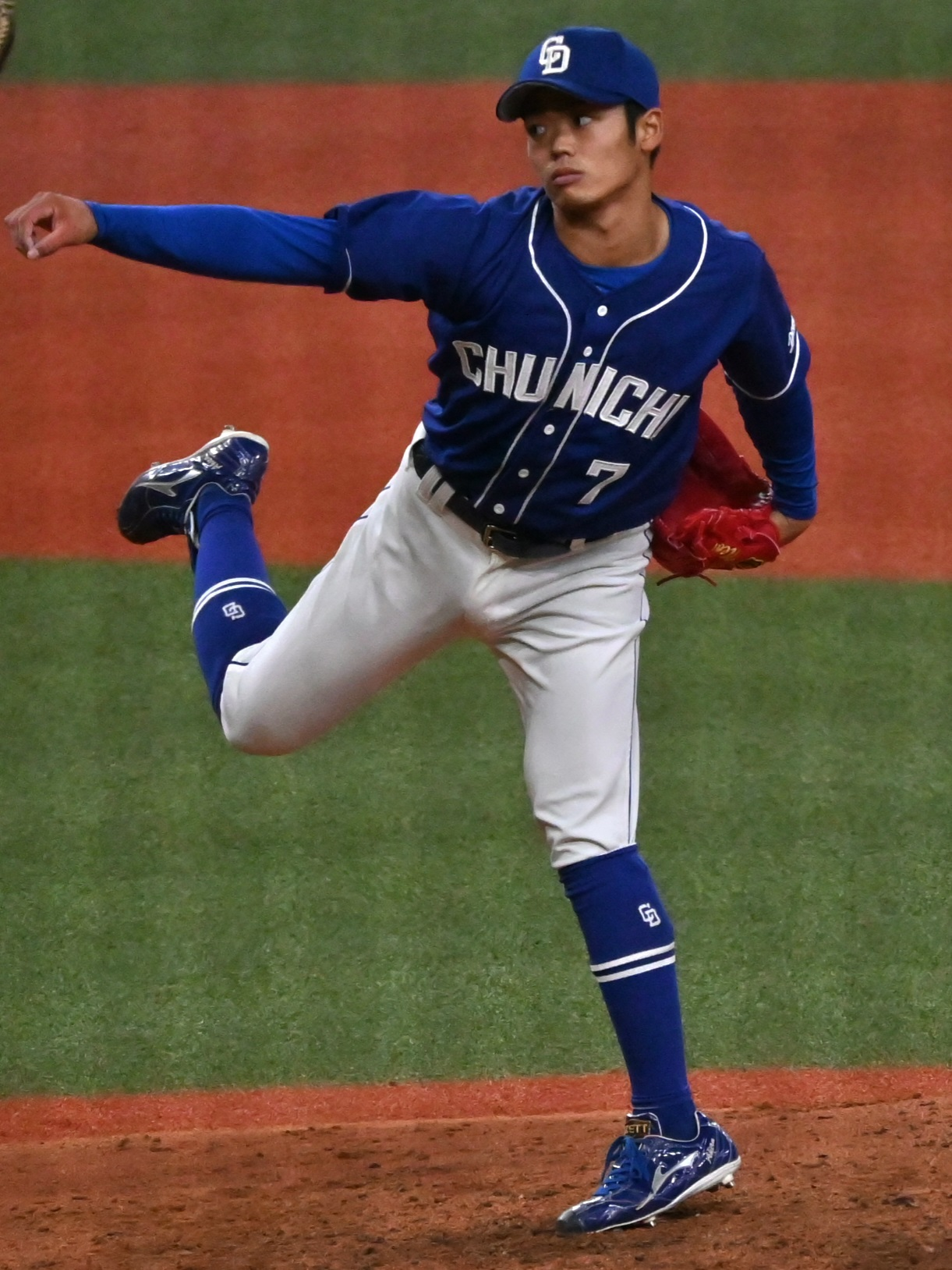

Chunichi Dragons – No. 30
- Infielder / Pitcher
- Born: April 19, 2000 (age 26); Hida, Gifu, Japan
- Bats: Left Throws: Right

NPB debut
- September 29, 2019, for the Chunichi Dragons

NPB statistics (through May 1, 2026)
- Batting average: .273
- Home runs: 10
- RBI: 107
- Win–loss record: 1-2
- ERA: 4.22
- Strikeouts: 51
- Stats at Baseball Reference

Teams
- Chunichi Dragons (2019–present)

Akira Neo (根尾昂, Neo Akira; born April 19, 2000) is a Japanese professional baseball pitcher and former infielder/outfielder for the Chunichi Dragons of Nippon Professional Baseball (NPB).

== Early career ==
An established two-way player for Osaka Tōin High School, Neo contributed to his school's wins at the 2018 spring invitational tournament and the summer national championships.

On 20 October 2018, Neo was the contested 1st draft pick for the Chunichi Dragons, Hokkaido Nippon Ham Fighters, Tokyo Yakult Swallows and Tokyo Yomiuri Giants at the 2018 NPB Draft. Rights to negotiate for Neo's contract were won by the Dragons. On 4 November, Neo signed a pre-contract with the Dragons guaranteeing a ¥100,000,000 sign-on bonus and a ¥15,000,000 yearly salary with ¥50,000,000 in incentives.

== Professional career ==
=== Chunichi Dragons ===
==== 2019 ====
Neo had been earmarked to start spring training with the first team, but a pulled calf during an individual training session on 24 January confirmed a start with the second team.

Neo had a slow start in the Western League batting under .200 for the first few months of his professional career before hitting .324 during the month of June.

On July 10, it was confirmed that Neo would be starting the annual Fresh All-Stars game for the Western League alongside fellow 2018 draftees, Kōdai Umetsu and Kōta Ishibashi.

== Play style ==
Primarily playing at short, Neo amassed 32 home runs in his high school career as well as clocking 150 km/h (93 mph) on his fastball as a pitcher. He can run 50 metres in 6 seconds flat and has a throwing range of 115 meters.

== Personal life ==
Neo was a Japanese champion alpine skier in middle school and represented Japan at an international tournament in Italy. As a middle-school student, Neo played for Hida Boys with Kenshin Kakikoshi with whom he was reunited by with the Dragons at the 2018 draft.
