= Umetsu =

Umetsu (written: 梅津) is a Japanese surname. Notable people with the surname include:

- Kōdai Umetsu (梅津 晃大, born 1996), Japanese baseball player
- Yasuomi Umetsu (梅津 泰臣, born 1960), Japanese animator
