= Naoe =

Naoe is a masculine Japanese given name and surname. Naoe can be written using different kanji characters 直江, 直枝 or 尚江. It may refer to:

== People ==
- The Naoe clan, a Japanese clan that claims descent from Fujiwara no Maro and the Kyōke branch of the Fujiwara clan.
  - Naoe Kanetsugu, a Japanese samurai of the 16th-17th centuries
  - Naoe Kagetsuna, an officer under the Uesugi clan
- Naoe Fushimi, Japanese actress
- Kay Naoe, one of the two founding members of Oceanlane
- Kita Naoe, mangaka from Osaka
- Naoe Kinoshita, a Japanese Christian socialist
- Daisuke Naoe, a Japanese baseball player

== Fictional characters ==
- Naoe Bungo, a character in the Japanese film G.I. Samurai
- Naoe Kanno, a character from the anime/manga Strike Witches based on the Japanese WW2 ace Naoshi Kanno
- Nobutsuna Naoe, a character from the anime/ova/light novel series Mirage of Blaze
- Riki Naoe, the main protagonist from Little Busters! and Kud Wafter
- Shigen Naoe, a character from the video game The Last Blade
- Fujibayashi Naoe, a protagonist of the 2025 video game Assassin's Creed Shadows alongside Yasuke

== Places ==
- Naoe Station, a train station
