= Estamy Urena =

Dominican baseball player (born 1999)

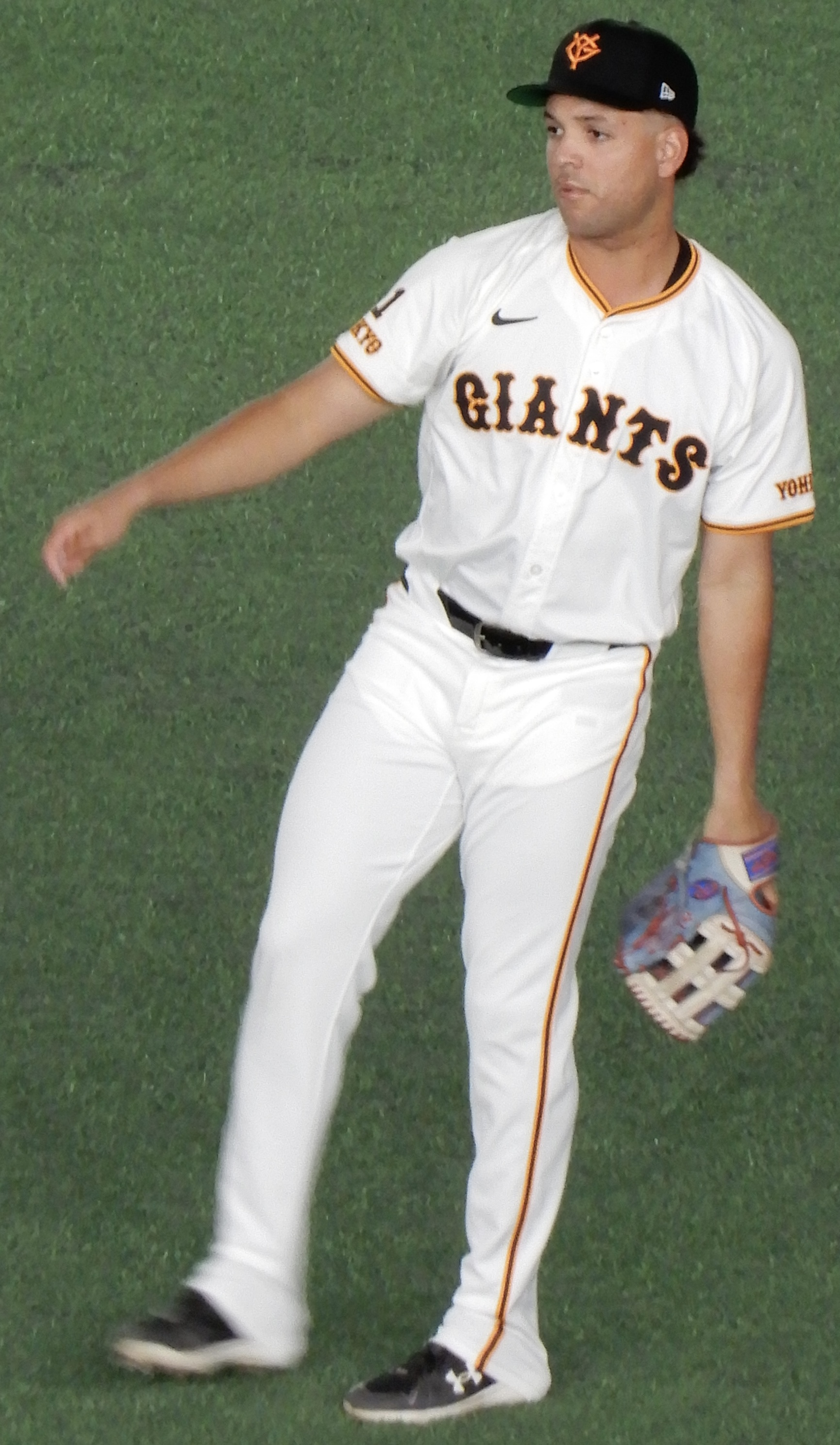
- Urena with the Yomiuri Giants in 2024

Pericos de Puebla – No. 27
- Infielder
- Born: May 27, 1999 (age 27); Santo Domingo, Dominican Republic
- Bats: Right Throws: Right

NPB debut
- September 23, 2020, for the Yomiuri Giants

NPB statistics (through 2024 season)
- Batting average: .100
- Home runs: 0
- Runs batted in: 0

Teams
- Yomiuri Giants (2020–2022); Tohoku Rakuten Golden Eagles (2023); Yomiuri Giants (2024)

Estamy Gabriel Urena (born May 27, 1999) is a Dominican professional baseball infielder for the Pericos de Puebla of the Mexican League. He has previously played in Nippon Professional Baseball (NPB) for the Yomiuri Giants and Tohoku Rakuten Golden Eagles.

== Career ==
=== Minnesota Twins ===
Urena signed with the Minnesota Twins as an international free agent on July 2, 2016. He made his professional debut with the Dominican Summer League Twins. Urena spent 2018 with the rookie–level Gulf Coast League Twins, playing in 41 games and hitting .293/.340/.361 with 21 RBI and five stolen bases.

Urena began the 2019 season with the Single–A Cedar Rapids Kernels, batting .225/.299/.310 with one home run and 11 RBI. He was released by the Twins organization on July 4, 2019.

=== Yomiuri Giants ===
In November 2019, Urena took part in a tryout for the Yomiuri Giants in the Dominican Republic, where he was spotted by Shinnosuke Abe, who was then the manager of the team's second team, and was accepted. On December 2, he signed a development contract with the Yomiuri Giants and joined the team. His uniform number was 26, and his estimated annual salary is 2.6 million yen (equal to $18,133 in US dollars).

On March 11, 2020, Urena played as the ninth batter and designated hitter in the first first-division exhibition game of the season against the Fukuoka SoftBank Hawks. After that, he played in 51 second-division games (Eastern League) until September 16, batting .297 with a team-leading 11 home runs and a league-leading 35 RBIs, and was registered as a controlled player on September 17. His uniform number is 98. His estimated annual salary is 5 million yen (equal to $34,881 in US dollars). He made his first appearance in the first-division game against the Hiroshima Toyo Carp on September 23 at the Tokyo Dome. On September 27, he made his first start as the seventh batter and left fielder in the 21st game against the Chunichi Dragons at the Tokyo Dome, recording his first hit in the bottom of the sixth inning off Keisuke Tanimoto. During the offseason, it was announced that he would remain with the team with an estimated annual salary of 10 million yen (equal to $69,763 in US dollars).

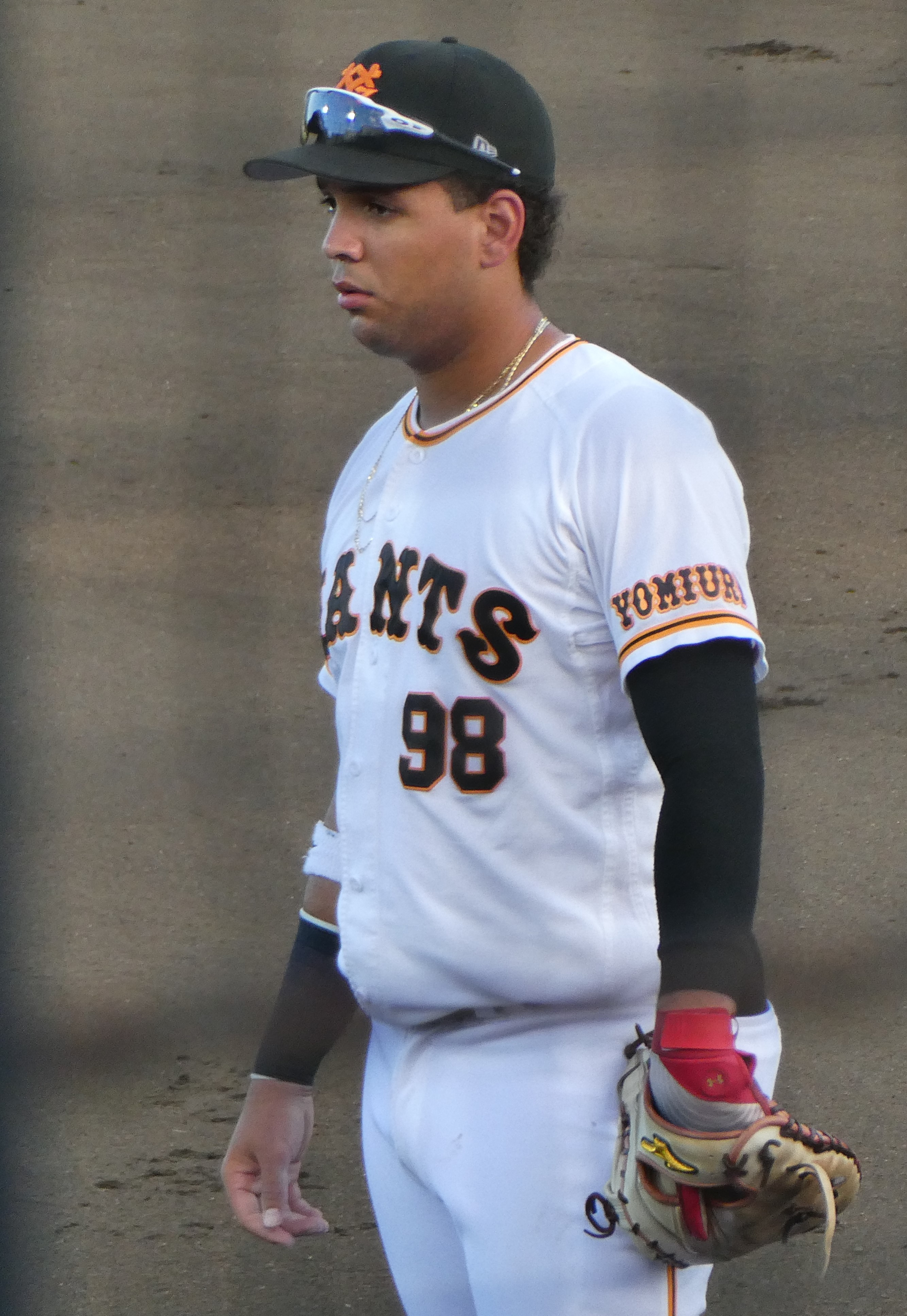
Urena in 2021

In 2021, he played in 86 games in the minor league, batting .249 with 10 home runs and 42 RBIs, but only played in four games in the major league. On November 15, he was notified that he would be a free agent with the possibility of being transferred to a development contract. On December 28, it was announced that he had re-signed as a development player with an estimated annual salary of $90,000 (9.9 million yen). His uniform number was changed to 098.

In 2022, he tied with Yu Matsumoto for the Eastern League RBI title with 57 RBIs. On October 3, the team announced that he would not sign a contract for the following year.

=== Tohoku Rakuten Golden Eagles ===
On November 16, 2022, Urena signed development player with the Tohoku Rakuten Golden Eagles. His estimated annual salary is 9.9 million yen (equal to $69,051 in US dollars).

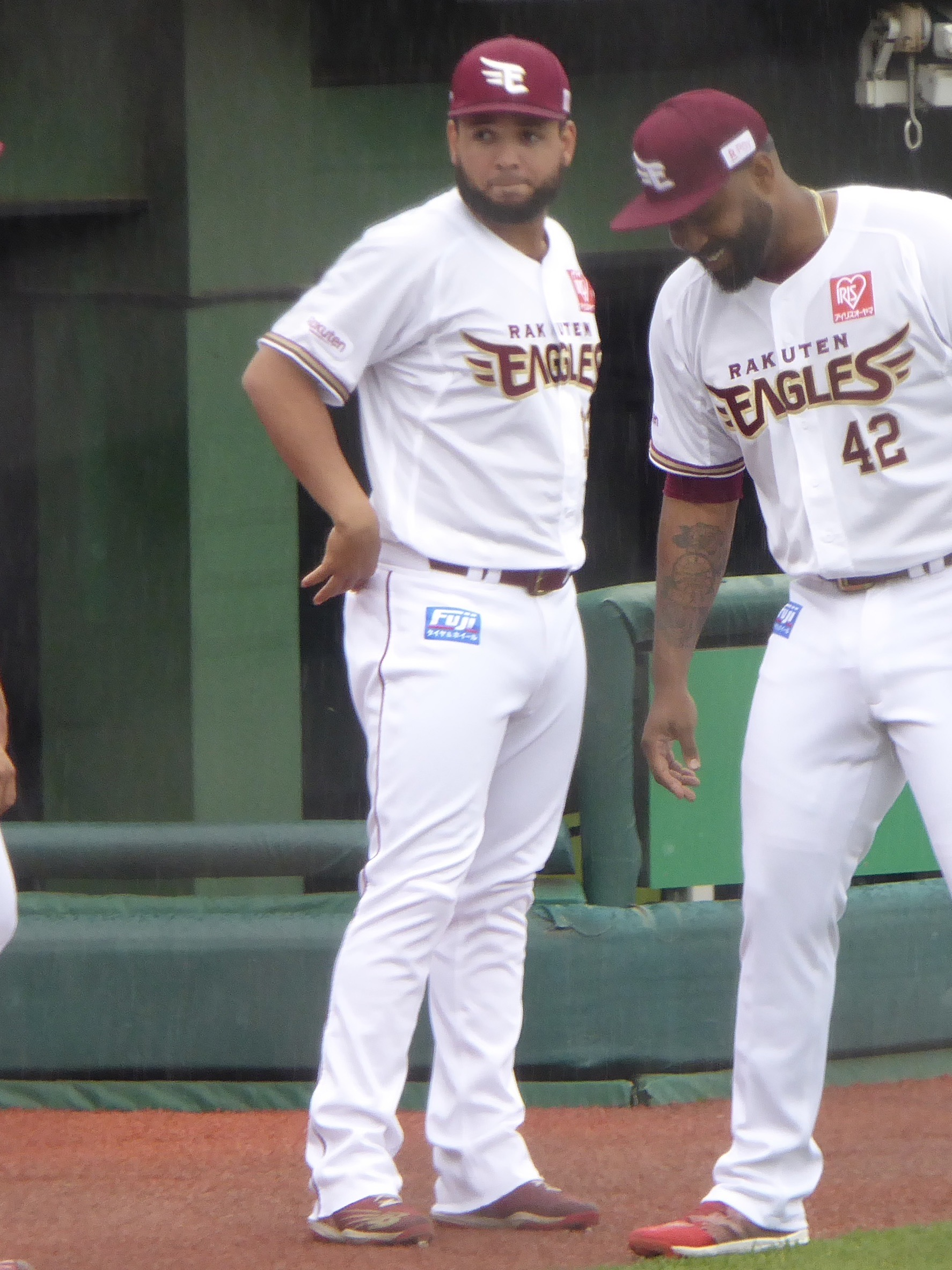
Urena in 2023

In 2023, he played in 66 games in the Eastern League, batting .242 with five home runs and 18 RBI, but did not play in the first team. He was released on October 11.

=== Yomiuri Giants (second stint) ===
On November 28, 2023, Urena return the old team Yomiuri Giants and signed development player. It is said that Shinnosuke Abe, who became the first-team manager, requested him to re-acquire him. His estimated annual salary is 6.5 million yen (equal to $45,336 in US dollars).

In 2024, he had a batting average of .244 and two home runs by April in the minor leagues, and on April 19, it was announced that he would be returned to the regular roster. His uniform number is 98, the same as in 2021. Abe explained, "He's not a helper. We're treating him like a 24-year-old Japanese player. And he knows that. He's a backup for (Okamoto) Kazuma." He played in 7 total games for Yomiuri in 2024, going 0–for–7 with 1 walk. On October 6, 2024, the Giants announced that they would not offer a contract to Urena, making him a free agent.

=== Pericos de Puebla ===
On November 21, 2024, Urena signed with the Pericos de Puebla of the Mexican League. In 88 games he hit .350/.396/.537 with 14 home runs, 77 RBIs and 6 stolen bases.

== Personal life ==
Urena is a powerful right-handed hitter with long range. Defensively, he can play first base, second base, third base, and left field.

His nicknames are "Ure'" and "Nya."

His childhood idols were José Reyes and Hanley Ramirez, while the players he was most impressed by playing against were Aaron Judge and Giancarlo Stanton.
