= Riku Watanabe =

Japanese baseball player (born 2000)

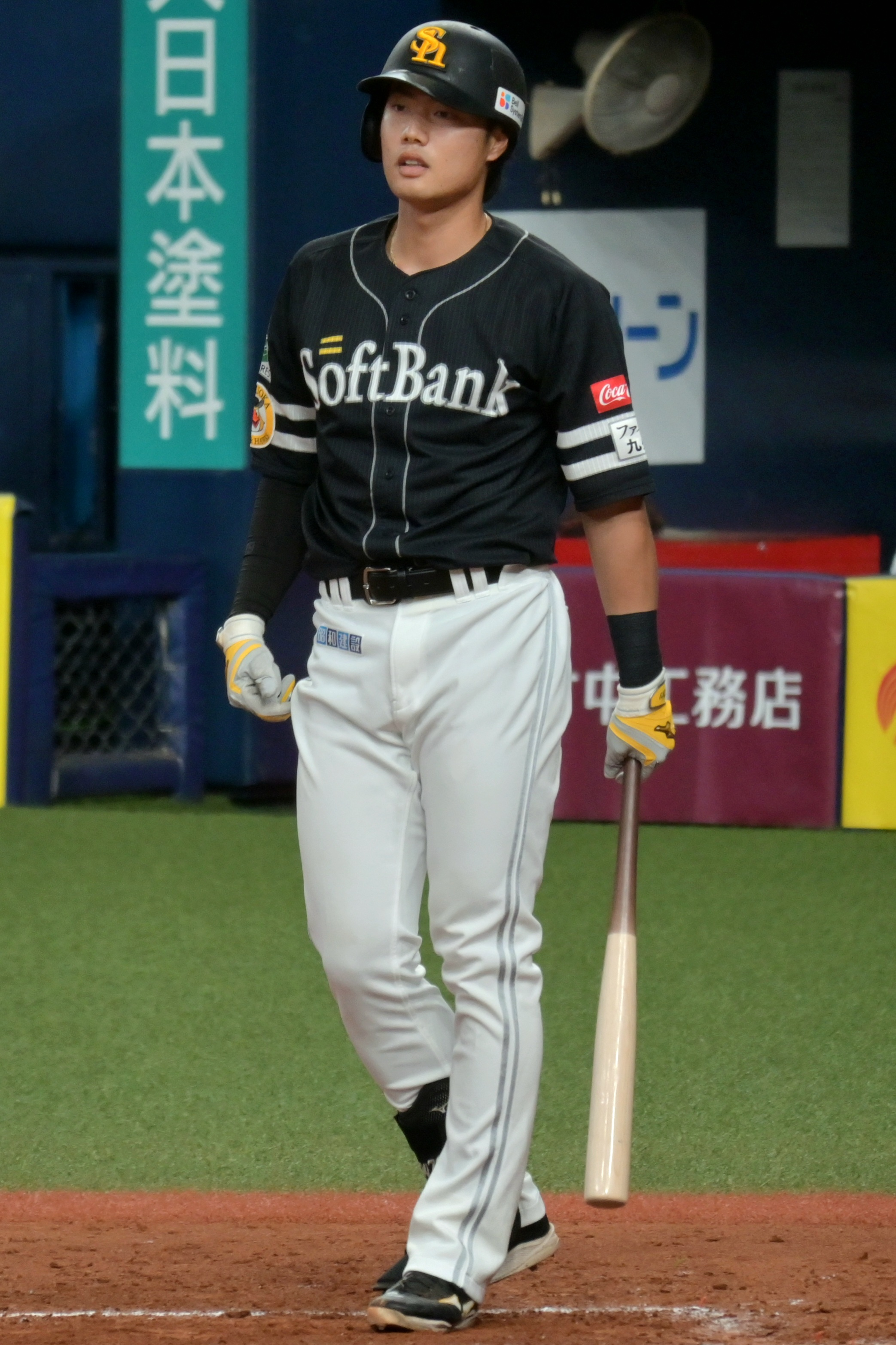

Fukuoka SoftBank Hawks – No. 00
- Catcher
- Born: September 24, 2000 (age 25); Nishihara, Kumamoto, Japan
- Bats: Left Throws: Right

NPB debut
- May 24, 2022, for the Fukuoka SoftBank Hawks

NPB statistics (through 2025 season)
- Batting average: .244
- Home runs: 3
- RBI: 14

Teams
- Fukuoka SoftBank Hawks (2019–present)

Career highlights and awards
- Japan Series champion (2025)

Riku Watanabe (渡邉 陸, Watanabe Riku; born September 24, 2000) is a Japanese professional baseball catcher for the Fukuoka SoftBank Hawks of Nippon Professional Baseball (NPB).

== Professional career ==
On October 25, 2018, Watanabe was drafted by the Fukuoka Softbank Hawks as a developmental player in the 2018 Nippon Professional Baseball draft.

In 2019–2021 season, he played in informal matches against the Shikoku Island League Plus's teams and amateur baseball teams, and played in the Western League of NPB's second league.

August 30, 2021, he re-signed a ¥6 million contract with the Fukuoka SoftBank Hawks as a registered player under control.

On May 24, 2022, Watanabe made his First League debut in the Interleague play (NPB) against the Yokohama DeNA BayStars. On May 28, he played as a starting member in the match against the Hiroshima Toyo Carp and recorded his first Home run. In 2022 season, he finished the regular season in 20 games with a batting average of .273, a 3 home runs and a RBI of 9.

In 2023 season, Watanabe played in 79 games in the Western League, but never had a chance to play in the Pacific League.
