= Kaname Takino =

Japanese baseball player (born 1996)

Kaname Takino 滝野要
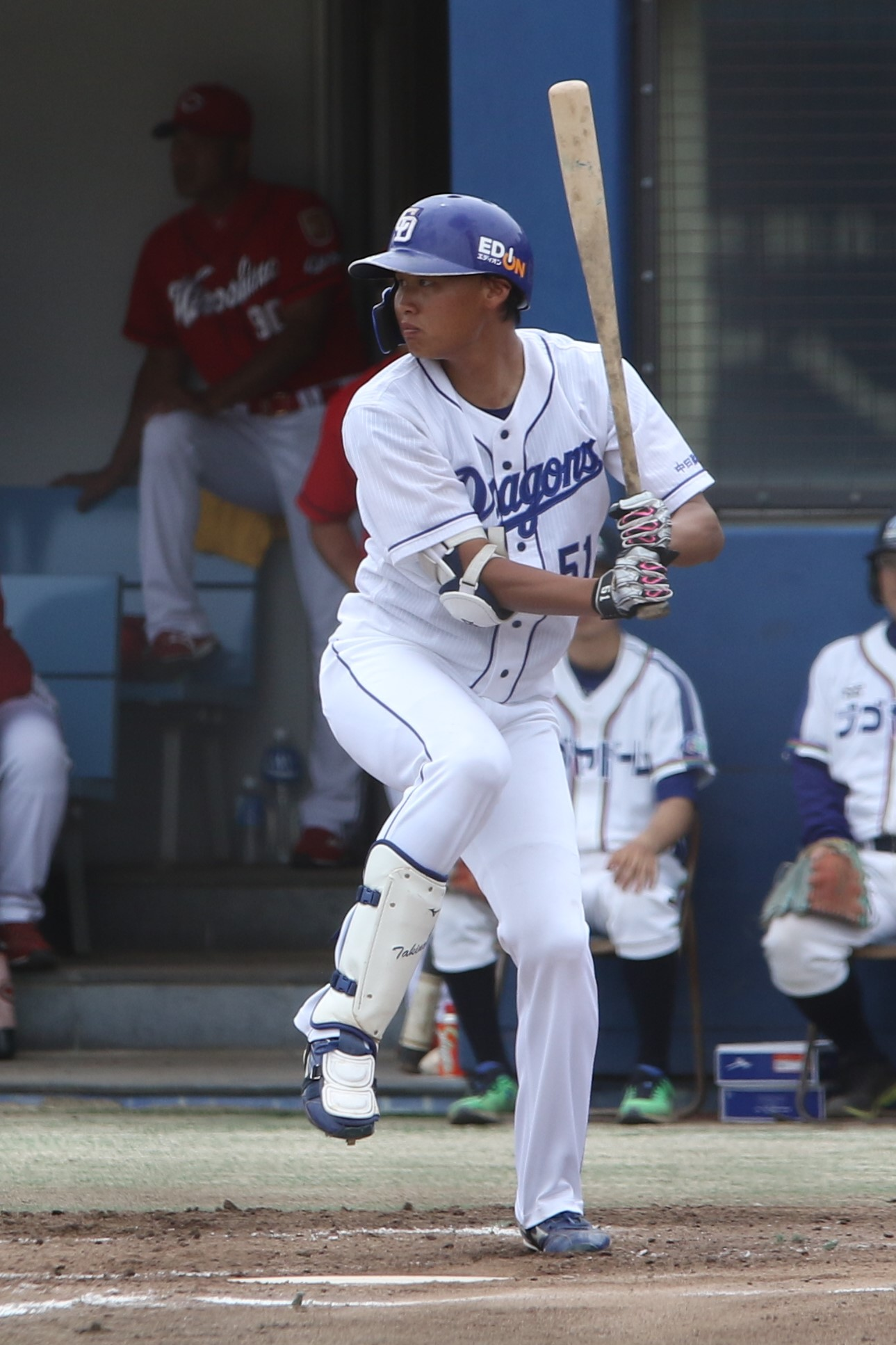
- Outfielder
- Born: July 8, 1996 (age 29); Matsuzaka, Mie, Japan
- Bats: Left Throws: Right

NPB debut
- June 17, 2020, for the Chunichi Dragons

NPB statistics (through 2022)
- Batting average: .174
- Hits: 8
- Homeruns: 0
- RBIs: 0

Teams
- Chunichi Dragons (2019–2022)

Kaname Takino (滝野要, Takino Kaname; born July 8, 1996) is a retired Japanese baseball outfielder. He played for the Chunichi Dragons between 2019 and 2022. He is currently a YouTuber.

On 25 October 2018, Takino was selected as the 6th draft pick for the Chunichi Dragons at the 2018 NPB Draft and on 8 November signed a provisional contract with a ¥30,000,000 sign-on bonus and a ¥7,200,000 yearly salary.

Upon being officially unveiled by the Dragons, Kaname commented that he wanted to be a 3-tool player like new team-mate Yohei Oshima.
