= Naoto Chino =

Japanese baseball player (born 1999)

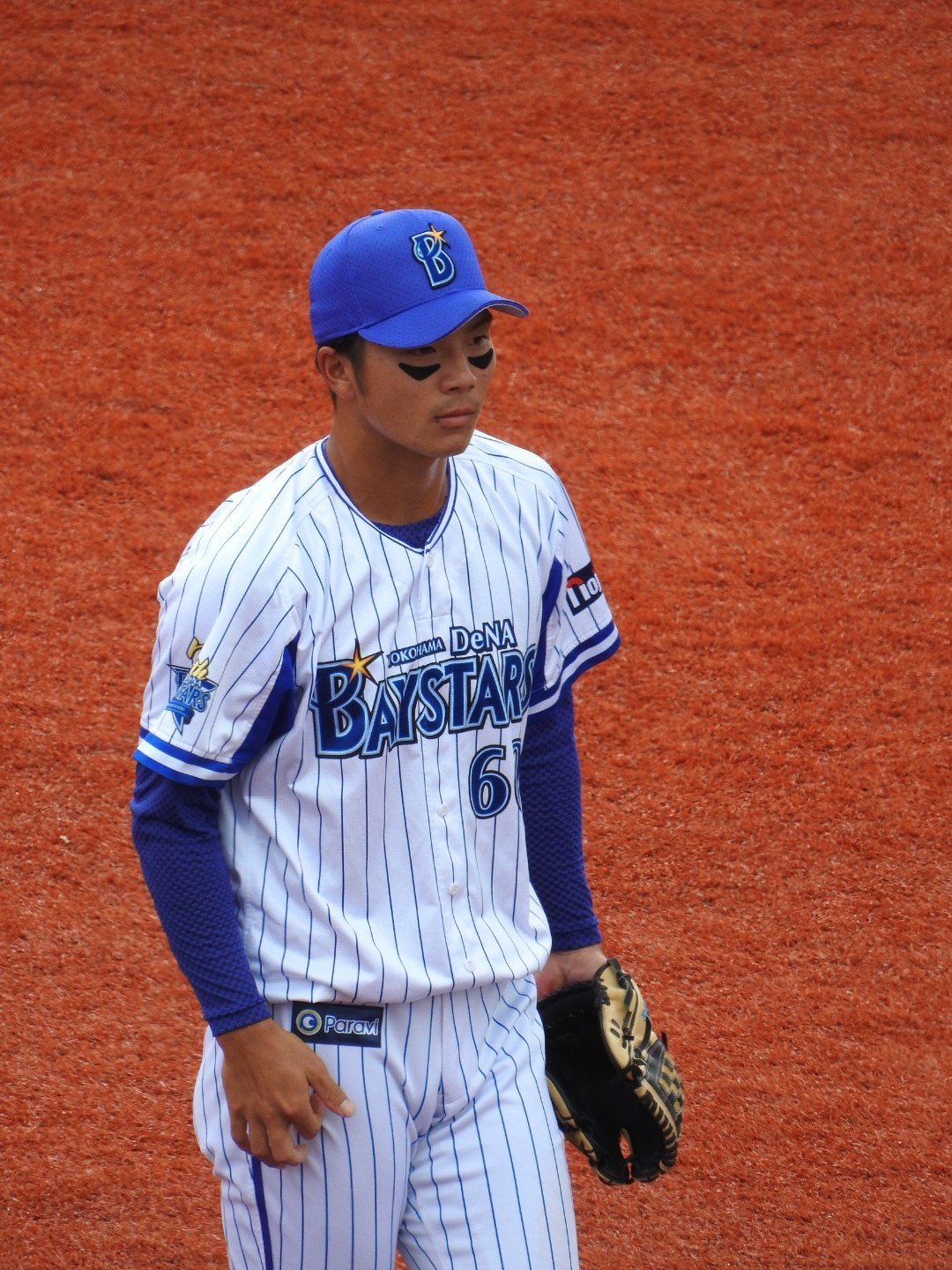
- Chino with the Yokohama DeNA BayStars

Chunichi Dragons – No. 65
- Infielder
- Born: February 16, 1999 (age 27); Sanjō, Niigata Prefecture, Japan
- Bats: Right Throws: Right

NPB debut
- April 24, 2021, for the Yokohama DeNA BayStars

Career statistics (through July 30, 2026)
- Batting average: .157
- Home runs: 4
- RBIs: 12

Teams
- Yokohama DeNA BayStars (2021–2025); Chunichi Dragons (2026–)

Career highlights and awards
- Japan Series champion (2024)

Naoto Chino (知野 直人, Chino Naoto; born February 16, 1999 in Sanjō, Niigata, Japan) is a professional Japanese baseball player. He plays as an infielder for the Chunichi Dragons.

== Career ==
=== Yokohama DeNA BayStars ===
On October 25, 2018, Chino was selected in the 6th round of the 2018 NPB draft by the Yokohama DeNA BayStars.

On September 3, 2023, Chino hit a grand slam off Haruto Inoue in a 7–8 loss to the Yomiuri Giants.

=== Chunichi Dragons ===
On December 9, 2025, Chino was selected by the Chunichi Dragons in the Active Player Draft.
