= Seiya Kinami =

Japanese baseball player (born 1994)

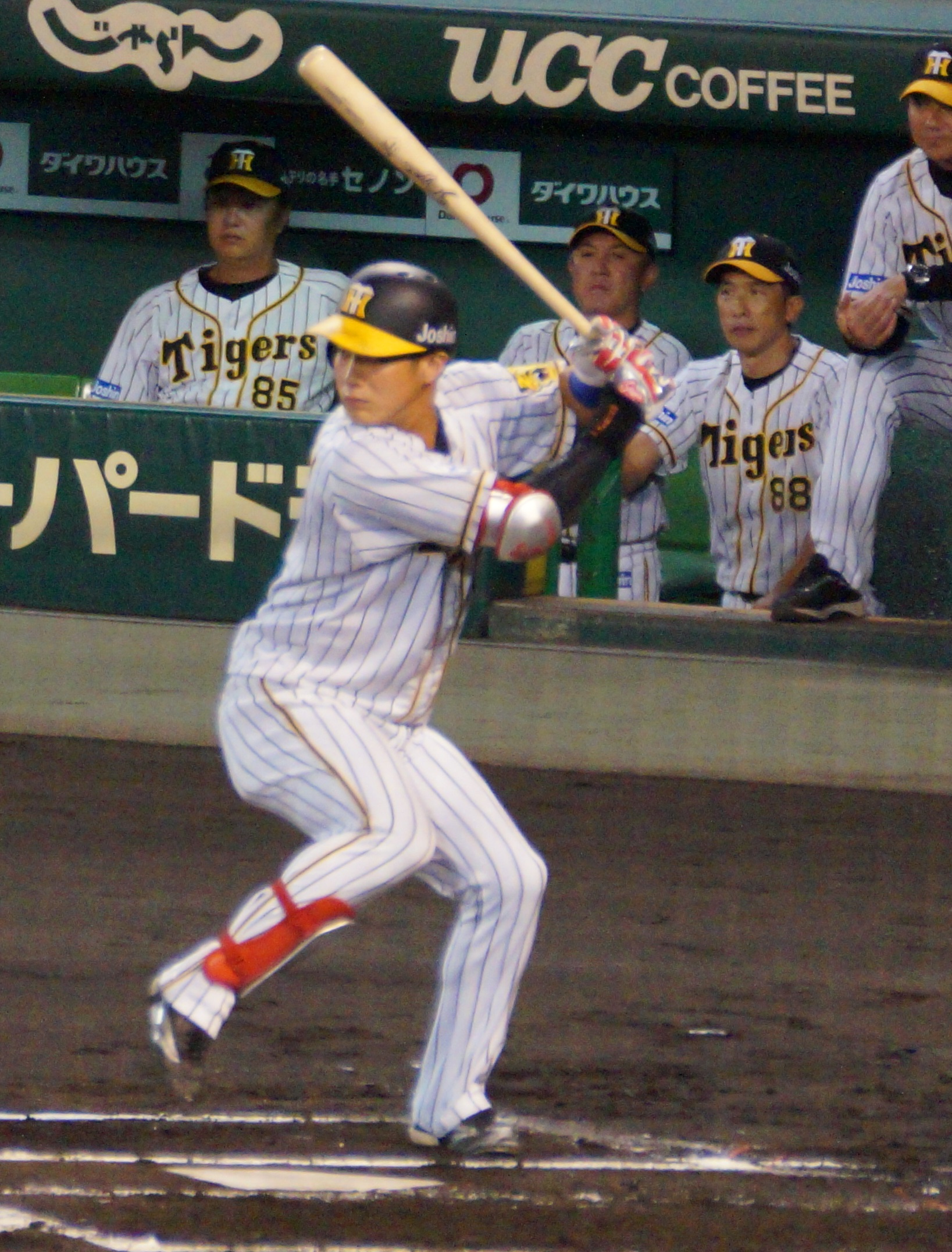
- Kinami batting for the Tigers

Hanshin Tigers – No. 0
- Shortstop
- Born: June 15, 1994 (age 32); Aomori City, Japan
- Bats: Left Throws: Right

NPB debut
- March 29, 2019, for the Hanshin Tigers

Career statistics (through 2024 season)
- Batting average: .245
- Hits: 401
- Home runs: 11
- RBI: 154
- Stolen bases: 5
- Stats at Baseball Reference

Teams
- Hanshin Tigers (2019–present)

Career highlights and awards
- 1× NPB All-Star (2023); 1× Mitsui Golden Glove Award (2023); 1× Best Nine Award (2023); 1× Japan Series Champion (2023)

Seiya Kinami (木浪 聖也, Kinami Seiya; born June 15, 1994 in Aomori City, Aomori, Japan) is a professional Japanese baseball shortstop for the Hanshin Tigers.

== Early baseball career ==
Seiya started playing little league softball in 1st grade for the Yasuda Yanyan Baseball club, then continued as a baseball player in junior high in his hometown in Aomori. He then went to play various infielder positions for Aomori Yamada High School, but his team never made it to any national tournaments.

He entered Asia University in Tokyo, and participated regularly as a starter in the Tohto University Baseball League. From his 3rd year, he helped his team win two successive league championships, as well as two championships in the Meiji Jingu National Tournament. In his 40 league appearances, he recorded a 0.236 batting average, 7 RBIs and 7 stolen bases.

Wanting to pursue a career in baseball despite not being selected in the professional drafts, he joined the industrial leagues under Honda where he played various infielder positions and batted as lead-off or clean-up during Intercity Baseball Tournaments. Because he never once recorded any home runs, his coaches in Honda helped him develop his lower body strength and changed his batting form which resulted to him hitting a total of 24 home runs during his 2 years in the league.

== Hanshin Tigers ==
He was the Tiger's 3rd pick at the 2018 Nippon Professional Baseball draft. He signed a 60 million yen contract with Hanshin, for an estimated annual salary of 10 million. He was assigned the jersey number 0, the same number he wore when he played for Honda.

2019

He joined the main team for spring training in Okinawa, and competed with Fumiya Hojoh and veteran Takashi Toritani for the shortstop position. On March 23, he broke the NPB record for most hits by a rookie in the pre-season exhibition games when he notched his 22nd hit. This performance earned him the shortstop position and lead-off spot during the season opening card with the Yakult Swallows. On March 29, he and fellow rookie Koji Chikamoto became the first pair of Hanshin rookies in 47 years to bat as lead-off hitters during the season opener. But he eventually got removed from the line-up when he failed to produce a single hit. He notched his first career hit on April 12 as a pinch hitter against the Dragons, and a few days later, hit his first career home run with two runners on base against Tomoyuki Sugano.

His appearances gradually increased by June either as a lead-off or 2nd batter, and he even went on a 7-game hitting streak. But with the entry of newly-imported Yangervis Solarte into the team, he got alternated with Solarte until he was eventually removed from the line up later in July. He redeemed himself in August by batting 0.431, and went on a 13-game hitting streak which tied the team rookie record notched by Chikamoto earlier in the season.

He finished the season with an average of 0.262, and scored 32 RBIs including 4 home runs in 113 games.
