= Kenshin Kakigoshi =

Japanese baseball player (born 2000)

Kenshin Kakigoshi 垣越建伸
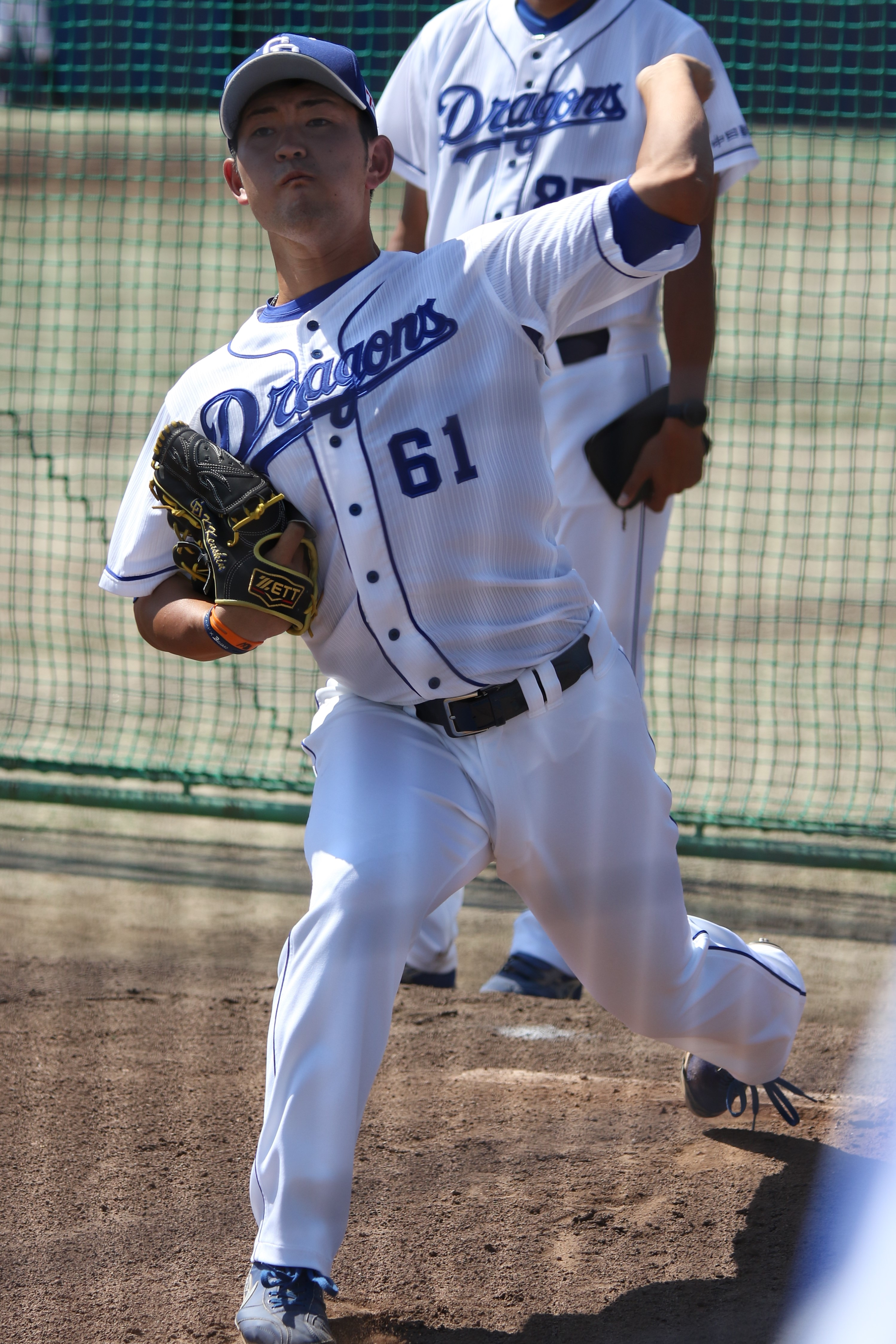

Free agent
- Pitcher
- Born: April 3, 2000 (age 26); Takayama, Gifu, Japan
- Bats: Left Throws: Left

Teams
- Chunichi Dragons (2019–2024)

Kenshin Kakigoshi (垣越建伸, Kakigoshi Kenshin; born April 3, 2000) is a Japanese professional baseball pitcher who is a free agent. He has previously played in Nippon Professional Baseball (NPB) for the Chunichi Dragons.

== Career ==
On October 25, 2018, Kakigoshi was selected as the 5th draft pick for the Chunichi Dragons at the 2018 NPB draft and on 11 November signed a provisional contract with a ¥30,000,000 sign-on bonus and a ¥5,500,000 yearly salary. Upon signing his contract, Kakigoshi mentioned Masahiro Yamamoto and Daisuke Matsuzaka as players he would like to emulate.

As a middle-school student, Kakigoshi played for local club Hida Boys with Akira Neo with whom he was reunited by with the Dragons at the 2018 draft.

On November 26, 2020, Kakigoshi re-signed with the Dragons. On October 8, 2024, it was announced Kakigoshi had been released by the team.
