= Sotaro Shimauchi =

Japanese baseball player (born 1996)

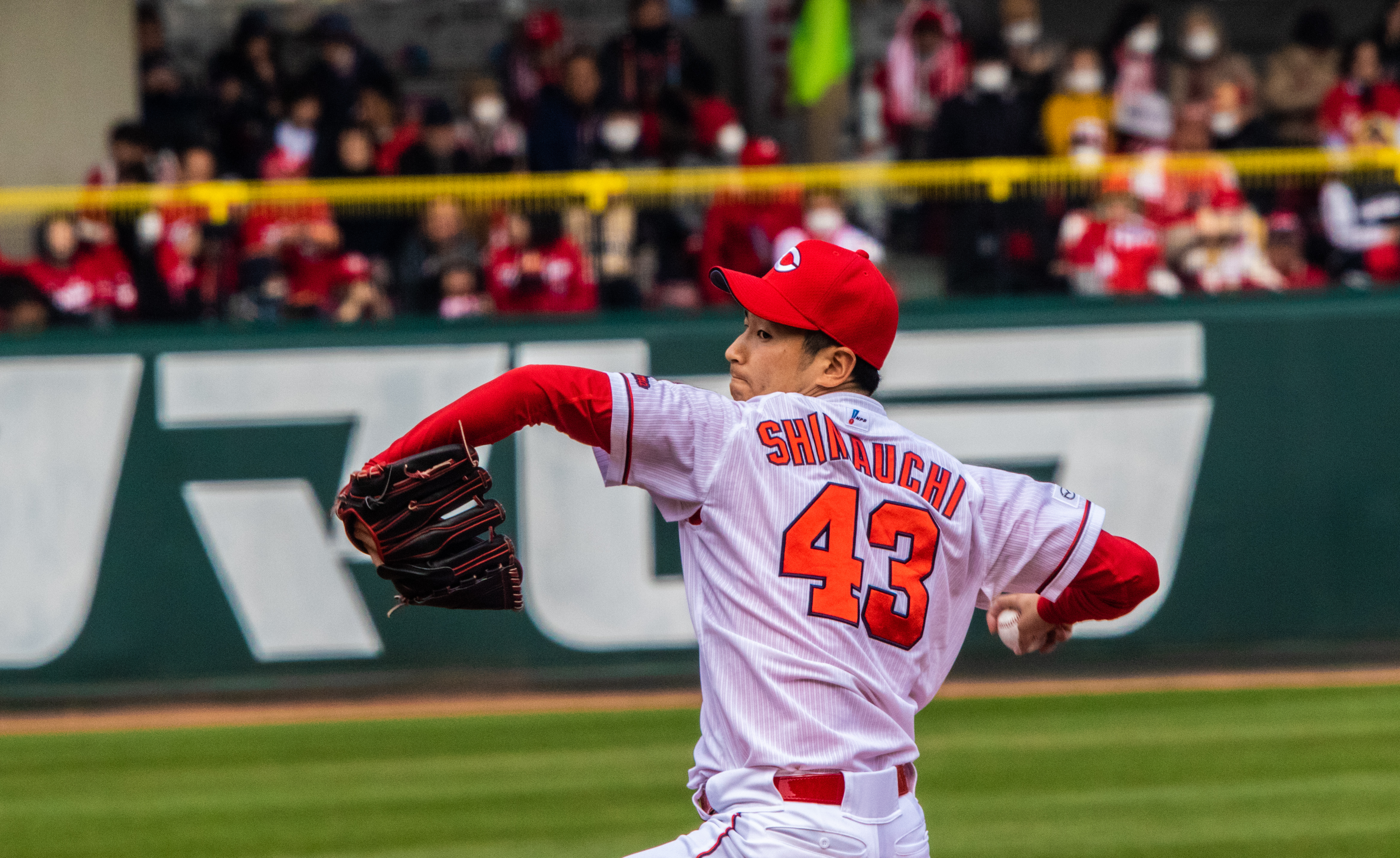

Hiroshima Toyo Carp – No. 43
- Pitcher
- Born: October 14, 1996 (age 29); Fukutsu, Fukuoka, Japan
- Bats: Right Throws: Right

NPB debut
- March 30, 2019, for the Hiroshima Toyo Carp

NPB statistics (through 2025 season)
- Win-loss record: 19-16
- Earned run average: 2.91
- Strikeouts: 326
- Stats at Baseball Reference

Teams
- Hiroshima Toyo Carp (2019–present)

Career highlights and awards
- Central League Most Valuable Setup pitcher (2023); NPB All-Star (2025)

Sotaro Shimauchi (島内 颯太郎, Shimauchi Sotaro; born October 14, 1996) is a Japanese professional baseball pitcher for the Hiroshima Toyo Carp of Nippon Professional Baseball (NPB).
