= Ryūhei Obata =

Japanese baseball player (born 2000)

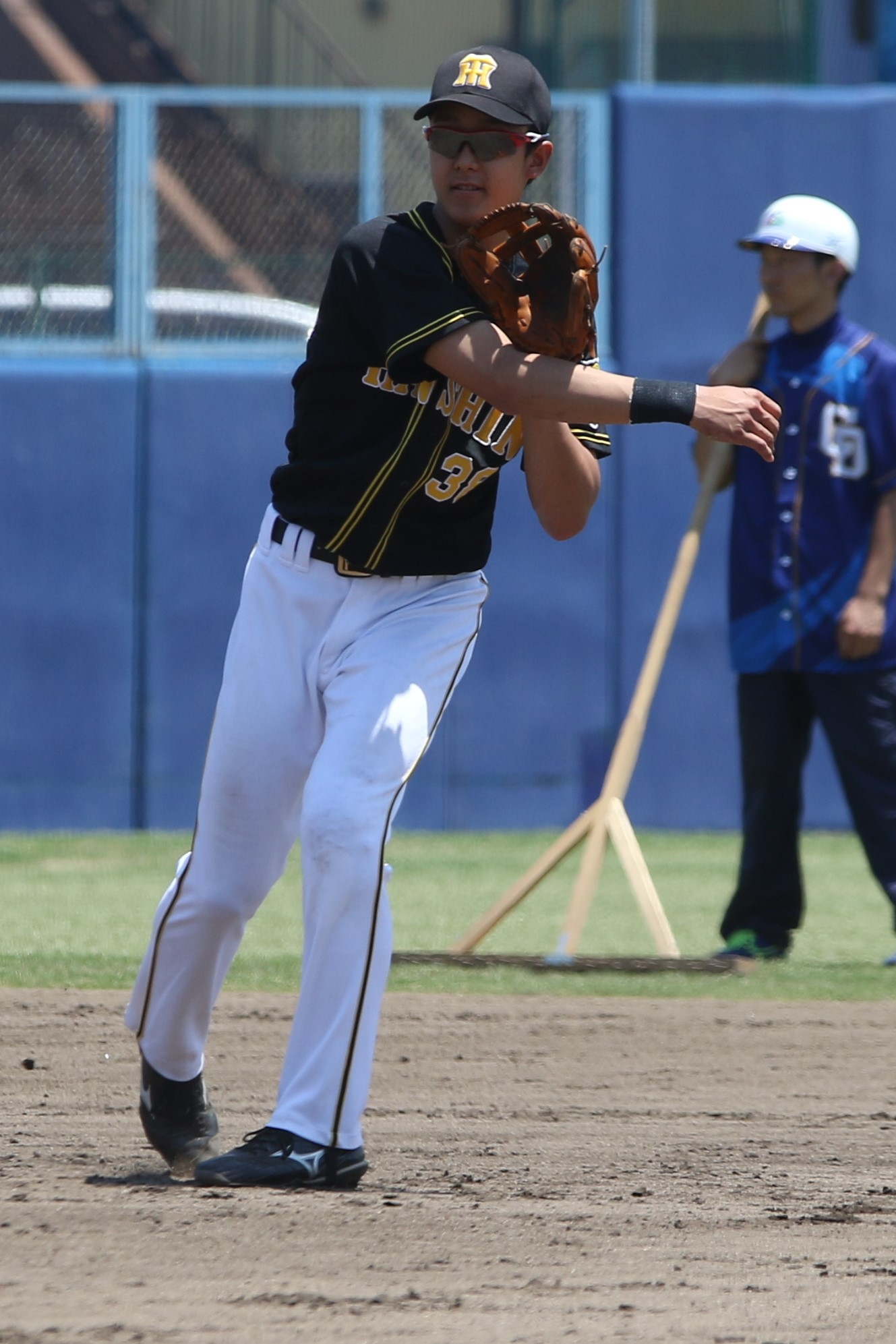
- Obata playing for the Tigers

Hanshin Tigers – No. 38
- Infielder
- Born: September 21, 2000 (age 25); Ōita City, Ōita Prefecture
- Bats: Left Throws: Right

debut
- August 22, 2020, for the Hanshin Tigers

Career statistics (through April 1, 2022)
- Batting average: .229
- Home runs: 0
- Runs batted in: 8
- Stats at Baseball Reference

Teams
- Hanshin Tigers (2019–present)

Ryūhei Obata (小幡 竜平, Obata, Ryūhei; born September 21, 2000 in Ōita City, Ōita Prefecture, Japan) is a professional Japanese baseball infielder for the Hanshin Tigers.

== Early baseball career ==
A native of Oita, Ryūhei started as a softball pitcher and shortstop when he was in 3rd grade, and went on to play baseball for the Akeno Boys of Akeno Junior High.

He attended Nobeoka Gakuen High School in the neighboring prefecture Miyazaki, and secured an infielder position in the school's baseball team. In his 2nd year, he batted clean up during the prefectural and Kyushu regional tournaments, and recorded 17 hits and 9 RBIs in 9 games. In his senior year, he got to participate in the 2018 Spring Koshien but lost in the 1st round. Despite his team not making it into the Summer Koshien tournaments that year, he was chosen to join the national team in the 2018 BFA U18 Baseball Championships where Japan placed 3rd.

== Hanshin Tigers ==
He was chosen as the Hanshin Tigers' 2nd round pick in the 2018 annual professional baseball draft. He signed a 60 million yen contract with the Tigers for a starting annual salary of 7.2 million yen, and was assigned jersey number 38.

2019

He spent the entire season playing in Western League games (minors) as a shortstop, and recorded a 0.225 batting average in 99 games, 9 stolen bases and 14 RBIs including 1 home run. He also participated in the Fresh All-Star inter-league games.
