= Kyota Fujiwara =

Japanese baseball player (born 2000)

Kyōta Fujiwara
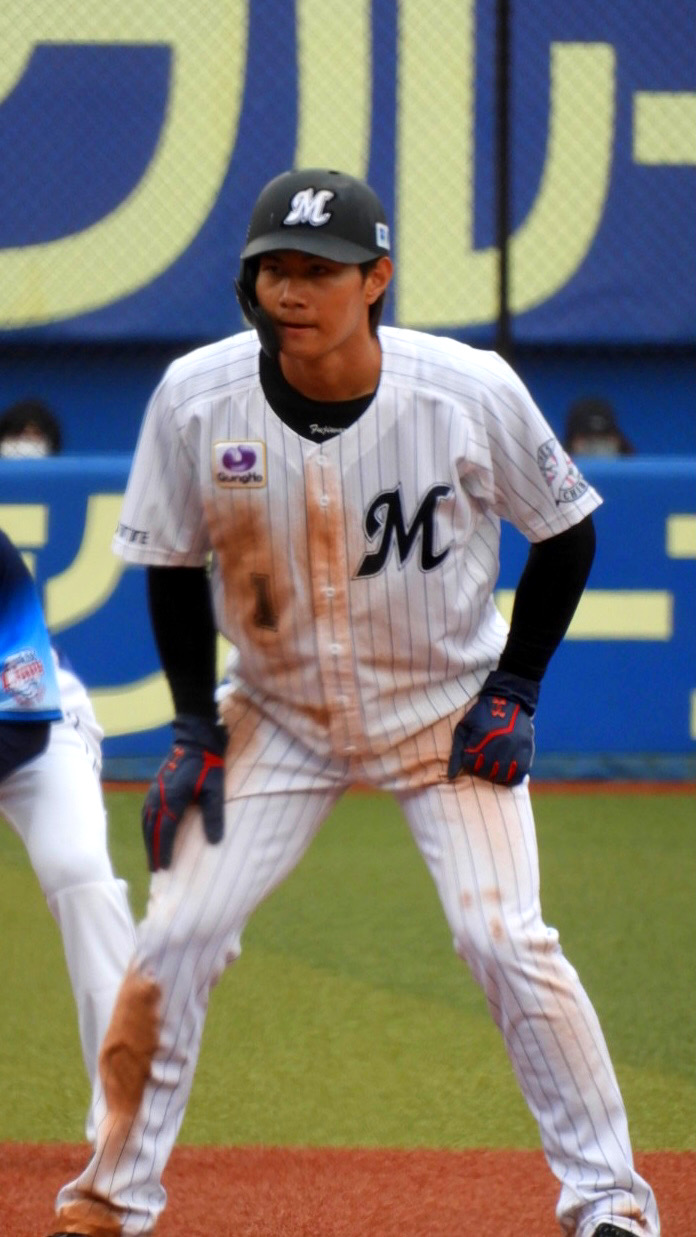

Chiba Lotte Marines – No. 1
- Outfielder
- Born: May 6, 2000 (age 25); Toyonaka, Osaka, Japan
- Bats: Left Throws: Left

NPB debut
- March 29, 2019, for the Chiba Lotte Marines

NPB statistics (through 2024 season)
- Batting average: .242
- Hits: 243
- Home runs: 14
- Runs batted in: 81
- Stolen base: 29
- Stats at Baseball Reference

Teams
- Chiba Lotte Marines (2019–present)

Kyōta Fujiwara (藤原 恭大, Fujiwara Kyōta; born May 6, 2000) is a professional Japanese baseball player. He plays outfielder for the Chiba Lotte Marines.
