= Kakeru Yamanobe =

Japanese baseball player (born 1994)

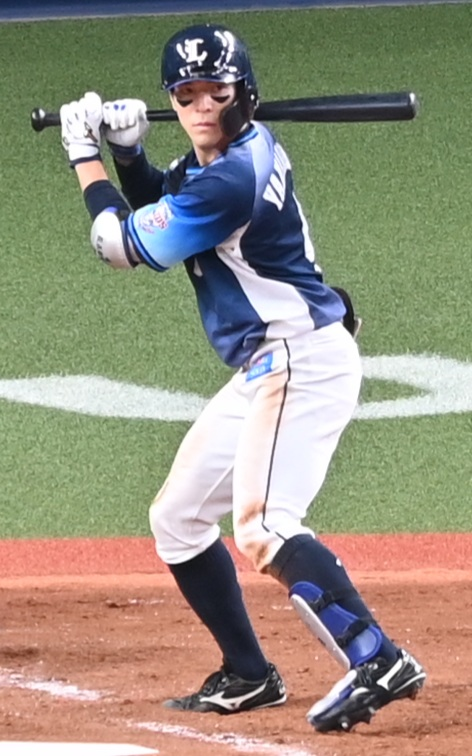
- Yamanobe with the Saitama Seibu Lions

Tokyo Yakult Swallows – No. 37
- Infielder
- Born: May 24, 1994 (age 32); Fuchū, Tokyo, Japan
- Bats: Right Throws: Right

NPB debut
- April 21, 2019, for the Saitama Seibu Lions

NPB statistics (through 2024 season)
- Batting average: .196
- Home runs: 0
- Runs batted in: 10
- Stats at Baseball Reference

Teams
- Saitama Seibu Lions (2019–2025); Tokyo Yakult Swallows (2025–present)

Kakeru Yamanobe (山野辺 翔, Yamanobe Kakeru; born May 24, 1994) is a Japanese professional baseball infielder for the Tokyo Yakult Swallows of Nippon Professional Baseball (NPB). He has previously played in NPB for the Saitama Seibu Lions.

== Career ==
=== Saitama Seibu Lions ===
Yamanobe began his professional career in 2019 with the Saitama Seibu Lions, playing for the team through the beginning of the 2025 season.

=== Tokyo Yakult Swallows ===
On May 1, 2025, Yamanobe was traded to the Tokyo Yakult Swallows in exchange for cash considerations.
