= Yūki Takahashi (baseball) =

Japanese baseball player

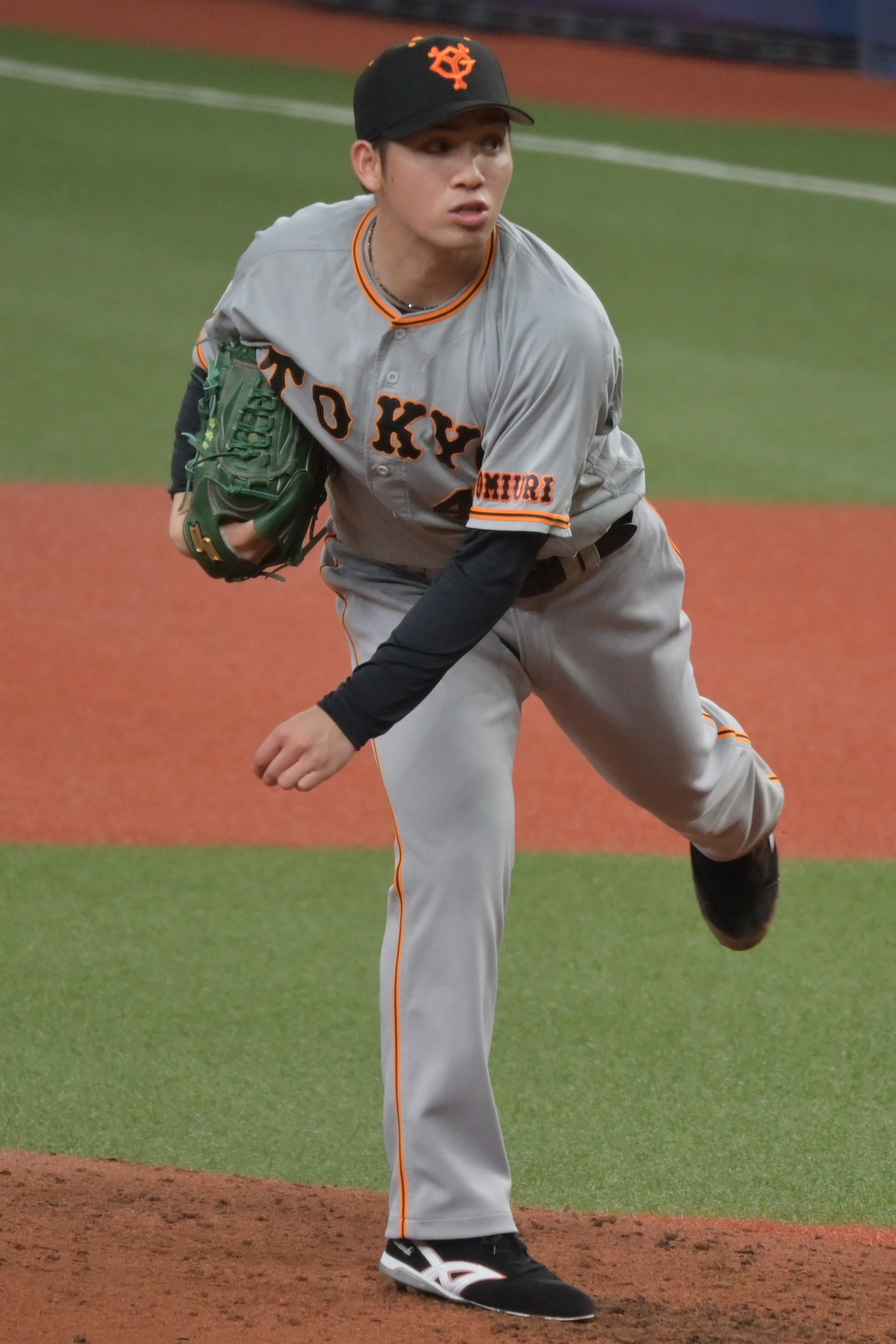
- Takahashi with the Yomiuri Giants

Yomiuri Giants – No. 57
- Pitcher
- Born: February 1, 1997 (age 29); Hitachinaka, Ibaraki, Japan
- Bats: Left Throws: Left

NPB debut
- September 21, 2019, for the Yomiuri Giants

Career statistics (through 2021 season)
- Win–loss record: 17-19
- Earned Run Average: 3.40
- Strikeouts: 188
- Saves: 0
- Stats at Baseball Reference

Teams
- Yomiuri Giants (2019–present)

Career highlights and awards
- NPB All-Star (2021)

Yūki Takahashi (髙橋 優貴, Takahashi Yūki; born February 1, 1997 in Hitachinaka, Ibaraki, Japan) is a professional Japanese baseball player. He plays pitcher for the Yomiuri Giants.
