= Taiki Hamada =

Japanese baseball player (born 2000)

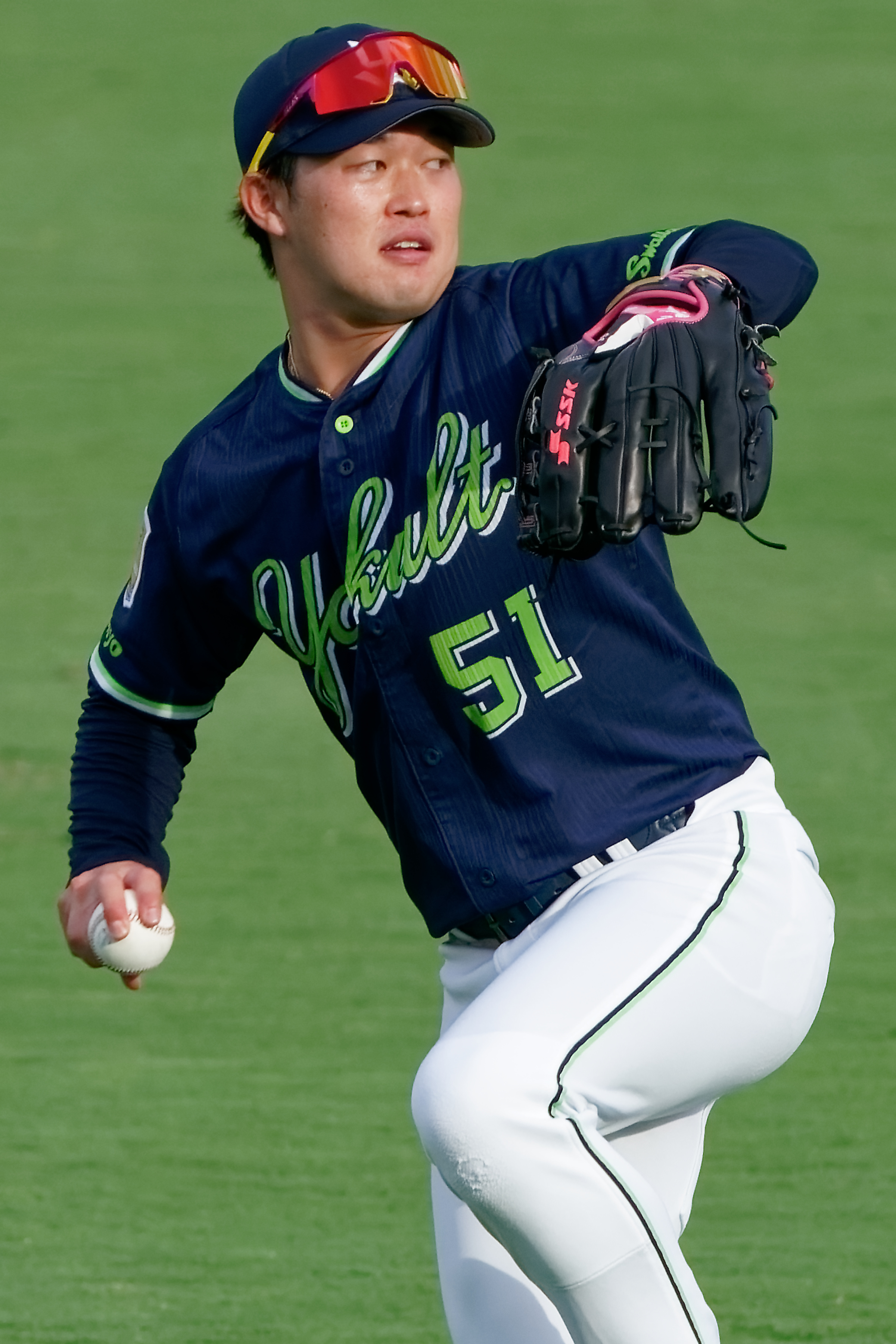

Hanshin Tigers – No. 32
- Outfielder
- Born: September 4, 2000 (age 26); Kitakyushu, Fukuoka, Japan
- Bats: Right Throws: Right

NPB debut
- September 25, 2019, for the Tokyo Yakult Swallows

Career statistics (through 2025 season)
- Batting average: .212
- Hits: 131
- Home runs: 18
- Runs batted in: 219
- Stolen base: 4
- Stats at Baseball Reference

Teams
- Tokyo Yakult Swallows (2019–2025); Hanshin Tigers (2026–present)

Taiki Hamada (濱田 太貴, Hamada, Taiki; born September 4, 2000 in Kitakyushu, Fukuoka, Japan) is a professional Japanese baseball player. He plays outfielder for the Hanshin Tigers.
