= Suguru Fukuda =

Japanese baseball player (born 1996)

Suguru Fukuda 福田 俊
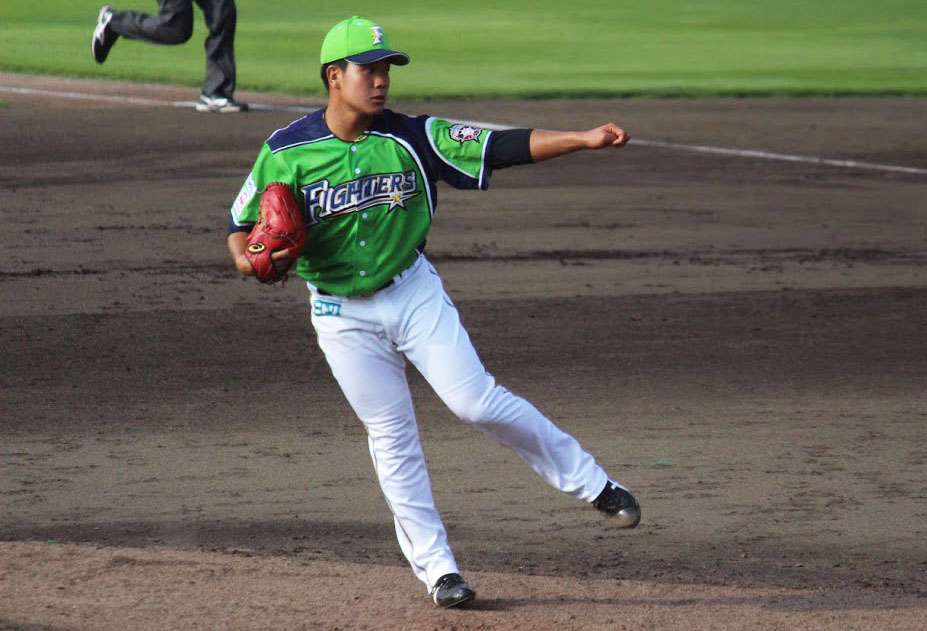

Hokkaido Nippon-Ham Fighters – No. 40
- Pitcher
- Born: December 14, 1996 (age 29); Sapporo, Hokkaido, Japan
- Bats: left Throws: Left

NPB debut
- July 7, 2020, for the Hokkaido Nippon-Ham Fighters

Career statistics (through 2024 season)
- Win–loss record: 1-0
- Earned Run Average: 2.20
- Strikeouts: 61
- Saves: 0
- Holds: 8
- Stats at Baseball Reference

Teams
- Hokkaido Nippon-Ham Fighters (2019–present)

Suguru Fukuda (福田 俊, Fukuda Suguru; born December 14, 1996 in Sapporo, Hokkaido, Japan) is a Japanese professional baseball pitcher for the Hokkaido Nippon-Ham Fighters of Nippon Professional Baseball (NPB).
