= Kōdai Umetsu =

Japanese baseball player (born 1996)

Kōdai Umetsu 梅津晃大
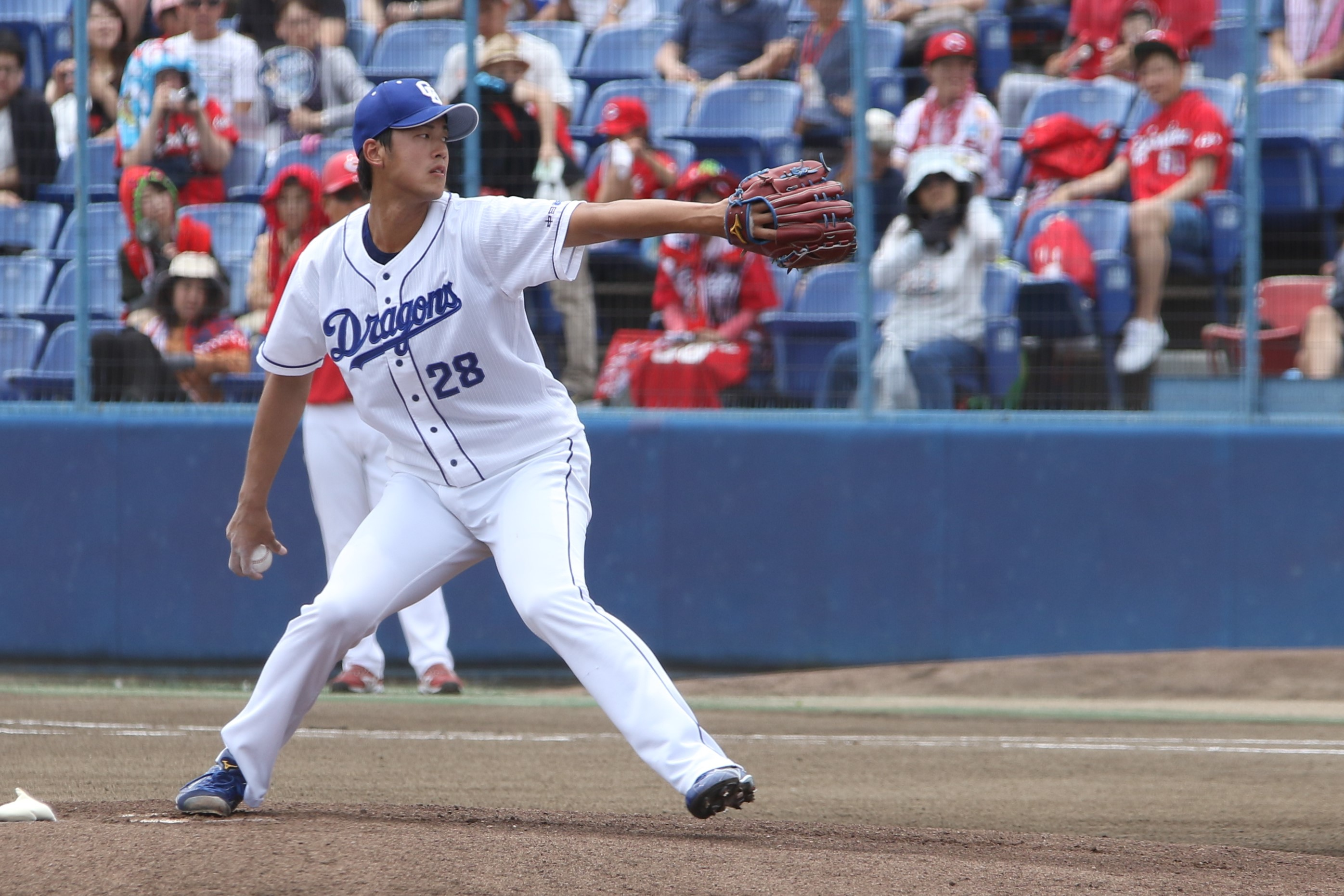

Chunichi Dragons – No. 18
- Pitcher
- Born: October 24, 1996 (age 29); Fukushima, Japan
- Bats: Right Throws: Right

NPB debut
- 12 August 2019, for the Chunichi Dragons

NPB statistics (through 2024 season)
- Win–loss record: 9–14
- Earned run average: 3.20
- Strikeouts: 167
- Stats at Baseball Reference

Teams
- Chunichi Dragons (2019–present)

Kōdai Umetsu (梅津晃大, Umetsu Kōdai; born October 24, 1996) is a Japanese professional baseball pitcher for the Chunichi Dragons of Nippon Professional Baseball (NPB).

== Early career ==
Born in Fukushima, Umetsu started playing baseball in Grade 2 with local club team Minami Koizumi Mets. Later, he would play in international tournaments in Grade 9 and 10 at Sendai Ikuei Shūkō Junior High School.

=== Sendai Ikuei Gakuen Senior High School ===
At Sendai Ikuei Gakuen Senior High School, Umetsu was on the bench in his junior year at the 85th Japanese High School Baseball Invitational Tournament. In Summer, he didn't even make the bench but from fall was given the ace number #1. In June of his third year, Umetsu fractured his wrist after being hit by a pitch which sidelined him. In summer, he made an appearance in the Fukushima prefectural tournament which would be his last where his team would miss the top 8 for the first time in 12 years.

=== Toyo University ===
Upon graduating high school Umetsu was reported as saying that "I want to play for a school that has brought together an amazing manager and players" which led to him signing on with Toyo University who were then in the 2nd division of the Tohto University Baseball League. In 2015, Umetsu was part of the active squad in his freshman year and made his starting debut against Tokyo Agricultural University in the 2nd game of the fall season. He had some starts following that but was unable to register a win or loss.

In the summer 2017 University Baseball summer league, in the game between Toyo University and Hosei University, Umetsu started and recorded his fastest pitch at 153 km/h. In Fall 2017 against Nihon University his first pitch was recorded at 151 km/h gathering the attention of pro scouts. However during the same fall season, Umetsu pulled a muscle in his throwing arm and was unable to contribute further. On 18 October 2018, in the third game of a Tohto league game against Kokugakuin University, Umetsu was threw 4 innings out of the bullpen for 3 strikeouts to record his first win.

=== 2018 NPB Draft ===
In the lead-up to the 2018 NPB Draft, Umetsu was one of three pitchers from Toyo University expected to go in the top rounds alongside Taiga Kamichatani and Hiroshi Kaino. On 25 October 2018, Umetsu was selected as the 2nd draft pick for the Chunichi Dragons at the 2018 NPB Draft and on 9 November signed a provisional contract with a ¥80,000,000 sign-on bonus and a ¥12,000,000 yearly salary.

== Professional career ==
=== Chunichi Dragons ===
Umetsu began the year injured but made a winning debut against the Hanshin Tigers on 12 August, throwing 6 innings and 4 strikeouts. On 3 September, Umetsu won his third consecutive game since debut against the Yomiuri Giants marking the best winning record for a rookie, Dragons pitcher since Shinichi Kondō went 3-0 to start his career in 1987. Umetsu finished his rookie season with a 4-1 record and a 2.34 ERA and on 12 November signed an improved contract at ¥15,000,000 per annum.

On 16 July 2025, Umetsu underwent surgery to repair a right shoulder labrum injury; he had not appeared in a game prior to the injury.

== Pitching style ==
Umetsu's fastball tops out at 153 km/h. His normal pitch mix includes a slider and forkball in addition to his four-seam fastball.

== Personal ==
Umetsu cites reaching the heights of Shohei Ohtani as his career goal.

At high school, Umetsu was known for his large appetite having held the record for most bowls or ramen eaten at Shodai Yokarōmon's (初代よかろうもん) Sendai Station store.
