= Riku Masuda =

Japanese baseball player (born 2000)

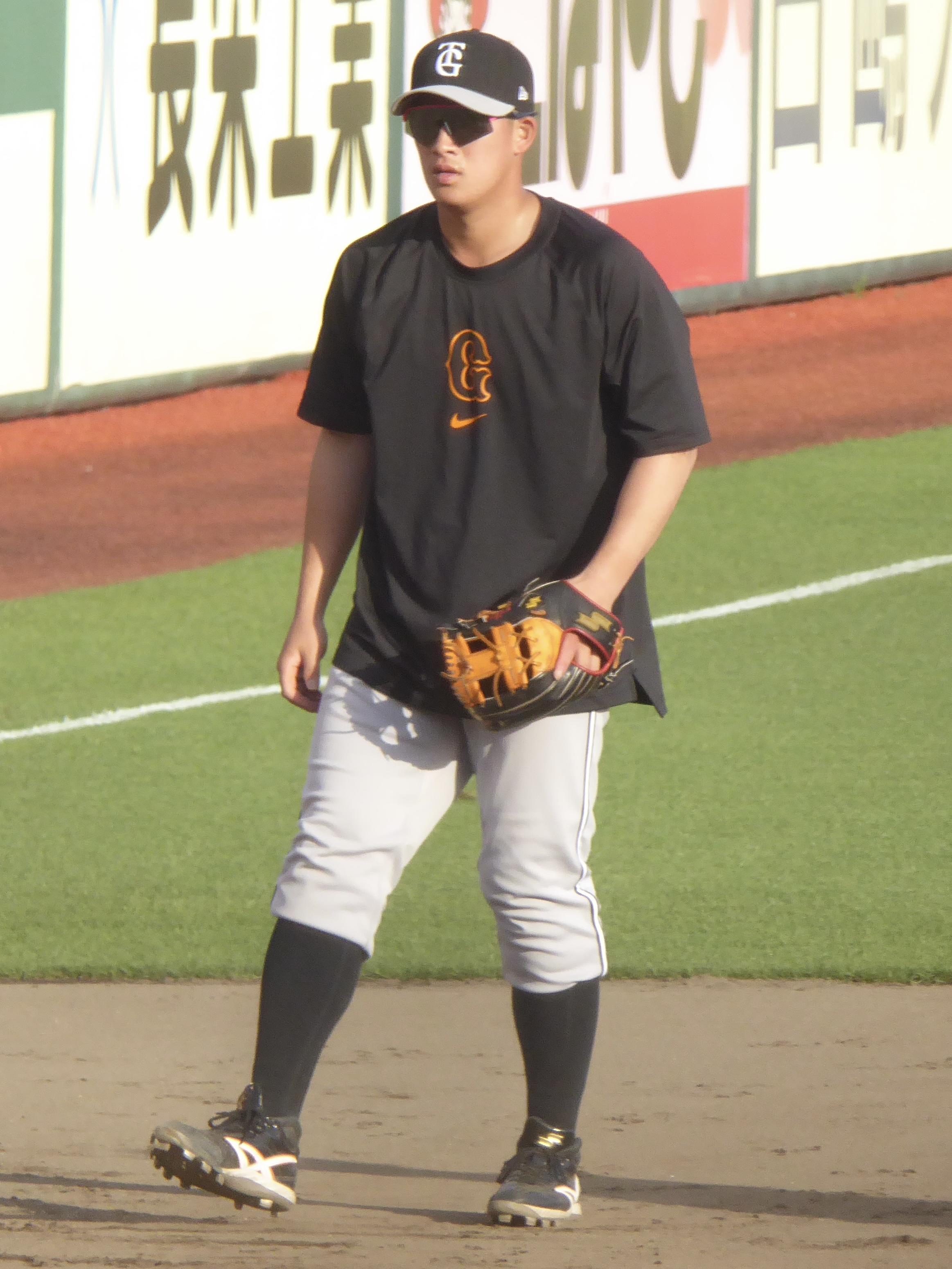
- Masuda with the Yomiuri Giants

Yomiuri Giants – No. 61
- Infielder
- Born: June 17, 2000 (age 25); Osaka, Osaka, Japan
- Bats: Right Throws: Right

NPB debut
- May 6, 2022, for the Yomiuri Giants

NPB statistics (through 2025 season)
- Batting average: .235
- Home runs: 10
- RBI: 37
- Hits: 96
- Stolen base: 2
- Sacrifice bunt: 5

Teams
- Yomiuri Giants (2019–present)

Riku Masuda (増田 陸, Masuda Riku; born June 17, 2000) is a professional Japanese baseball player. He plays infielder for the Yomiuri Giants.
