= Taisei Yoshida =

Japanese baseball player (born 1995)

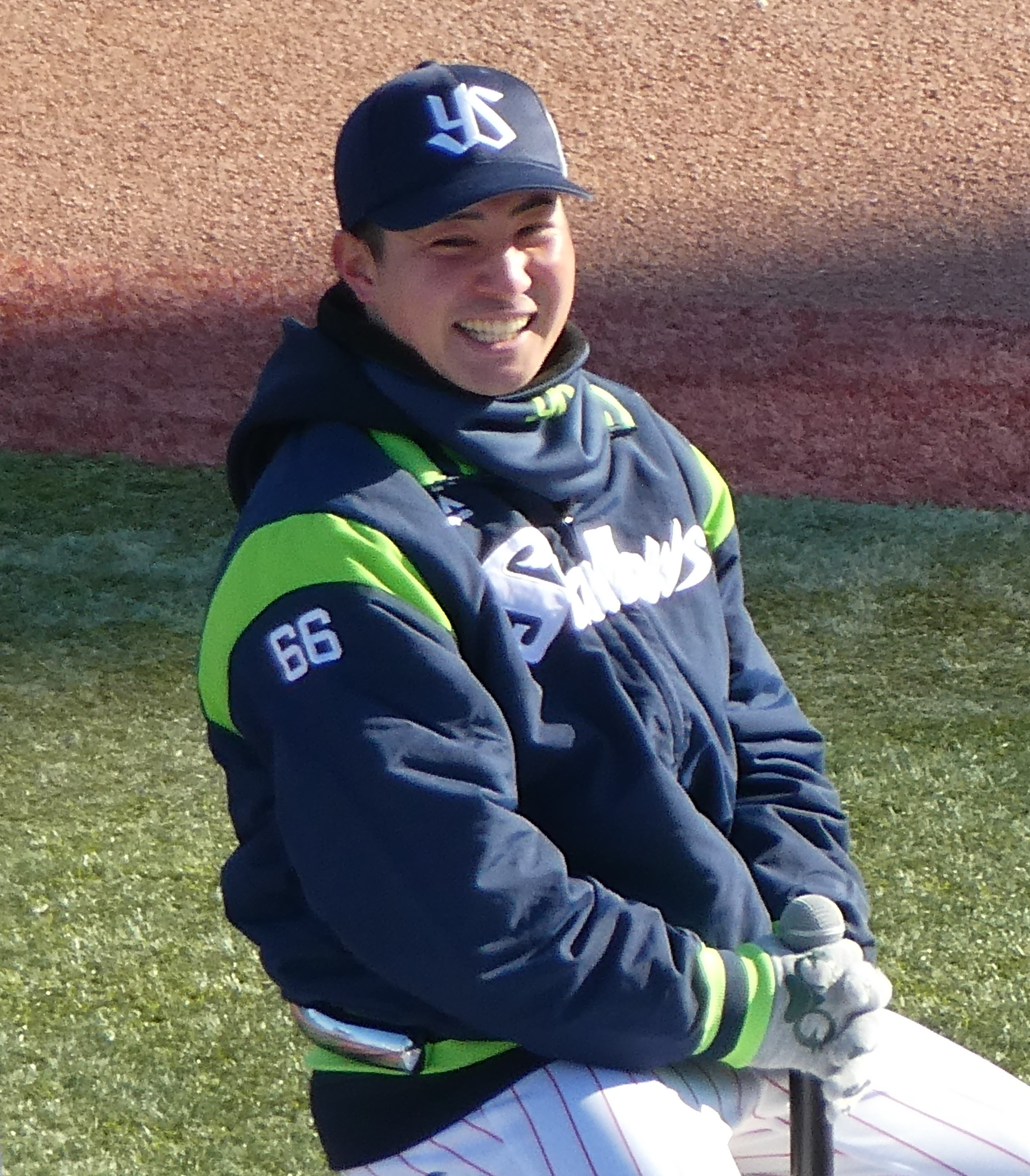
- Infielder
- Born: March 23, 1999 (age 27); Urayasu, Chiba, Japan
- Batted: Left Threw: Right

NPB debut
- June 24, 2019, for the Tokyo Yakult Swallows

Last NPB appearance
- November 1, 2021, for the Tokyo Yakult Swallows

Career statistics (through 2021 season)
- Batting average: .198
- Hits: 16
- Home runs: 1
- RBIs: 5
- Stolen bases: 3
- Stats at Baseball Reference

Teams
- Tokyo Yakult Swallows (2019–2022)

Taisei Yoshida (吉田 大成, Yoshida Taisei; born March 7, 1995 in Urayasu, Chiba, Japan) is a Japanese former professional baseball player. He played infield for the Tokyo Yakult Swallows.
