= Kōta Ishibashi =

Japanese baseball player (born 2000)

Kōta Ishibashi 石橋康太
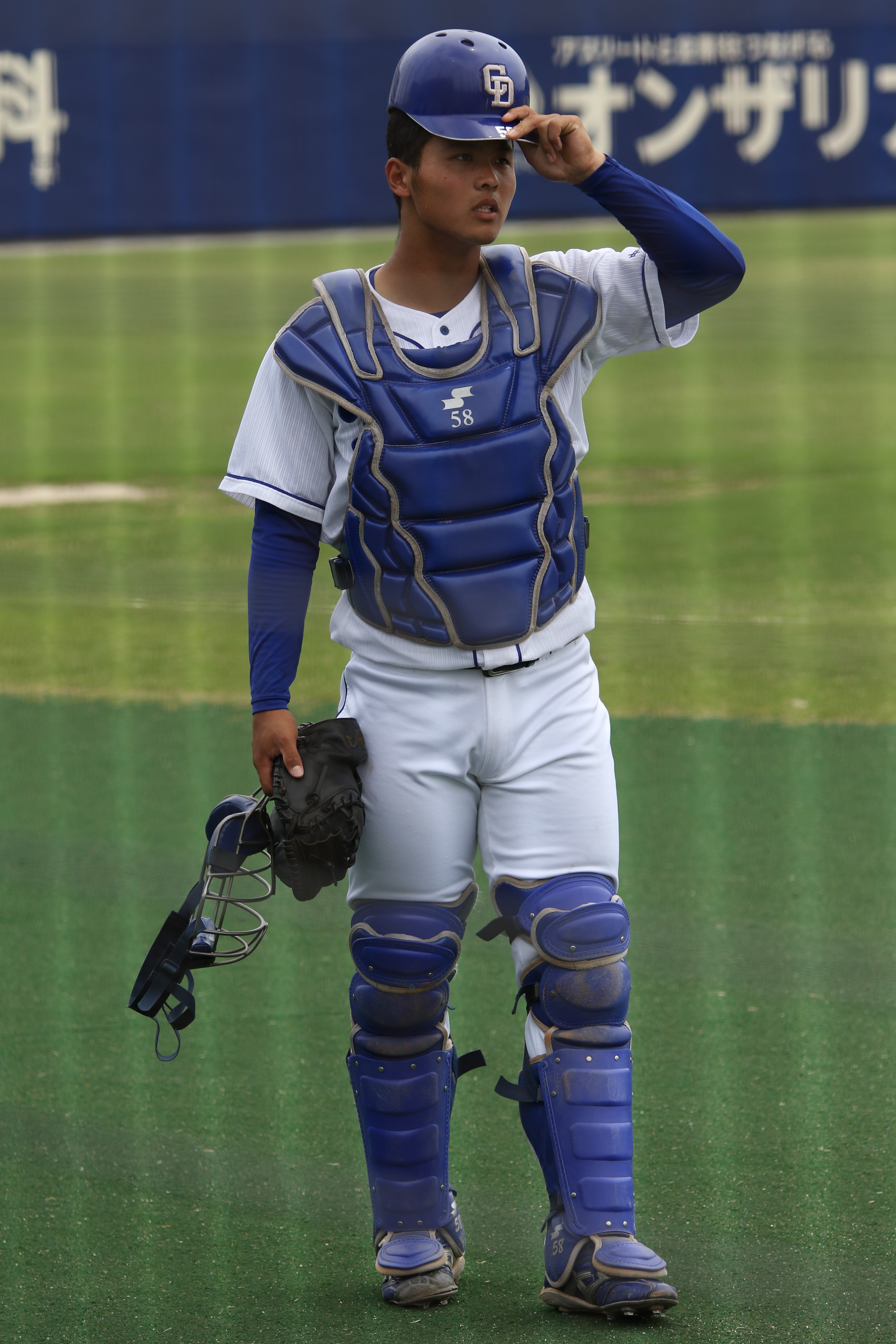

Chunichi Dragons – No. 58
- Catcher
- Born: December 7, 2000 (age 25); Yotsukaidō, Chiba, Japan
- Bats: Right Throws: Right

debut
- 7 July, 2019, for the Chunichi Dragons

Career statistics (through July 25, 2026)
- Batting average: .192
- Home runs: 2
- RBI: 19

Teams
- Chunichi Dragons (2019–present)

Kōta Ishibashi (石橋 康太, Ishibashi Kōta; born December 12, 2000) is a professional Japanese baseball player. He plays catcher for the Chunichi Dragons.

Ishibashi was widely regarded as the top high school aged catcher available at the 2018 NPB Draft.

== Early career ==
On 25 October 2018, Ishibashi was selected as the 4th draft pick for the Chunichi Dragons at the 2018 NPB Draft and on 21 November signed a provisional contract with a ¥40,000,000 sign-on bonus and a ¥6,000,000 yearly salary.

== Professional career ==
=== 2019 ===
On 7 July, Ishibashi made his professional debut as a pinch-hitter for Yuya Yanagi against the Tokyo Yakult Swallows. Ishibashi's debut marked the first time since Yasuhiko Kawai 1952 that a Dragons catcher, fresh out of high school had debuted in their first year and the first time since the draft was introduced. Two days later Ishibashi started against the Hiroshima Carp at Nagoya Dome with fellow teenager Tatsuya Shimizu on the mound.

== Playing style ==
Ishibashi can long throw up to 115 metres, has a pop-time of 1.9 seconds and can bat for power.

== Personal ==
Ishibashi considers Tokyo Yakult Swallows former catcher and manager, Atsuya Furuta along with hall of fame inductee Katsuya Nomura as his inspirations having read many of their books on catching.
