= Yua Tamiya =

Japanese baseball player (born 2000)

Yua Tamiya 田宮 裕涼
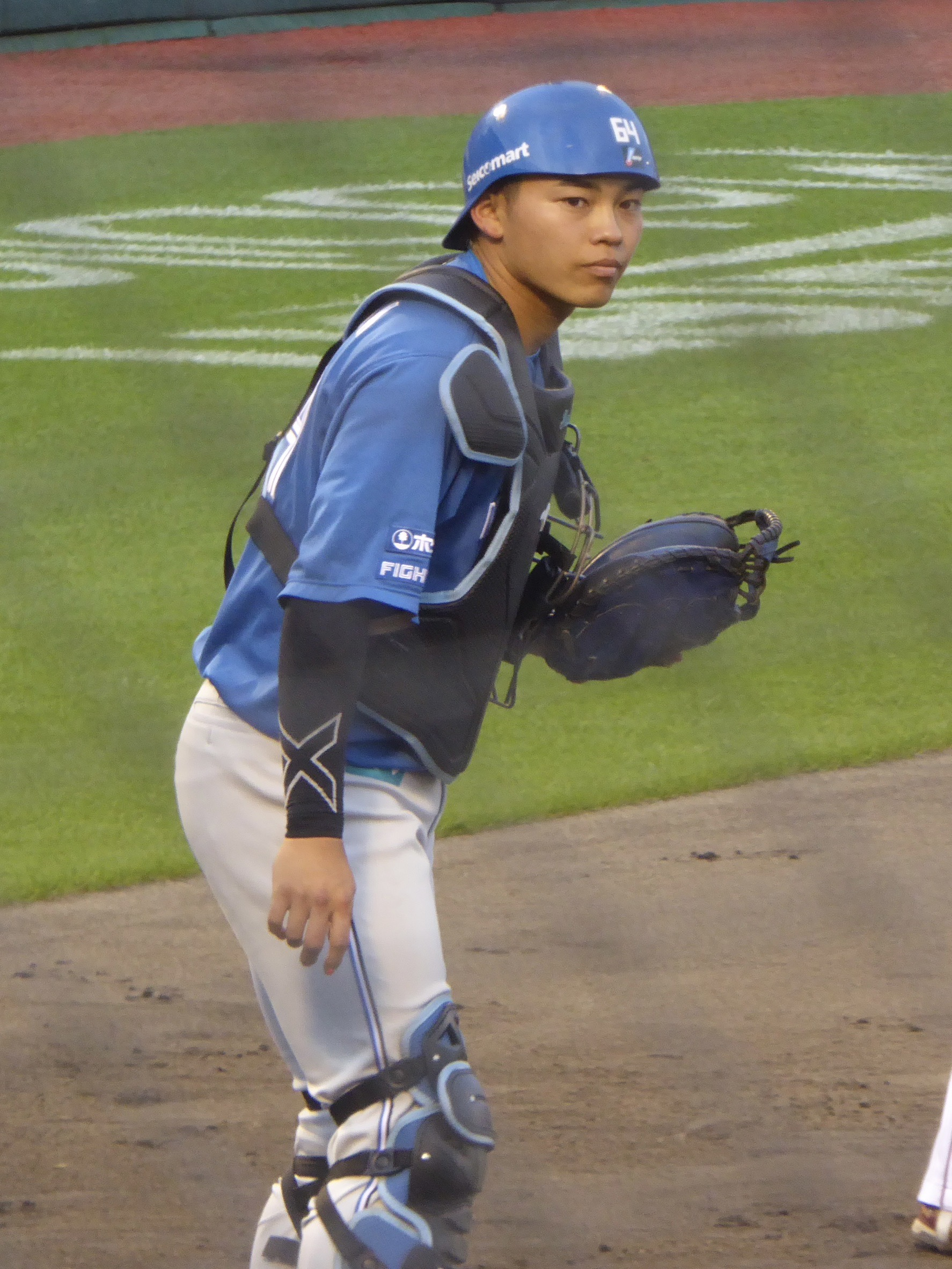

Hokkaido Nippon-Ham Fighters – No. 64
- Catcher
- Born: June 13, 2000 (age 25); Sanmu, Chiba, Japan
- Bats: Left Throws: Right

NPB debut
- September 27, 2020, for the Hokkaido Nippon-Ham Fighters

Career statistics (through 2023 season)
- Batting average: .228
- Home runs: 2
- RBI: 9
- Hits: 13
- Stolen bases: 3
- Stats at Baseball Reference

Teams
- Hokkaido Nippon-Ham Fighters (2019–present)

Career highlights and awards
- NPB All-Star (2024)

Yua Tamiya (田宮 裕涼, Tamiya Yua; born June 13, 2000 in Sanmu, Chiba, Japan) is a Japanese professional baseball catcher for the Hokkaido Nippon-Ham Fighters of Nippon Professional Baseball (NPB).
