= Taisei Urushihara =

Japanese baseball player (born 1996)

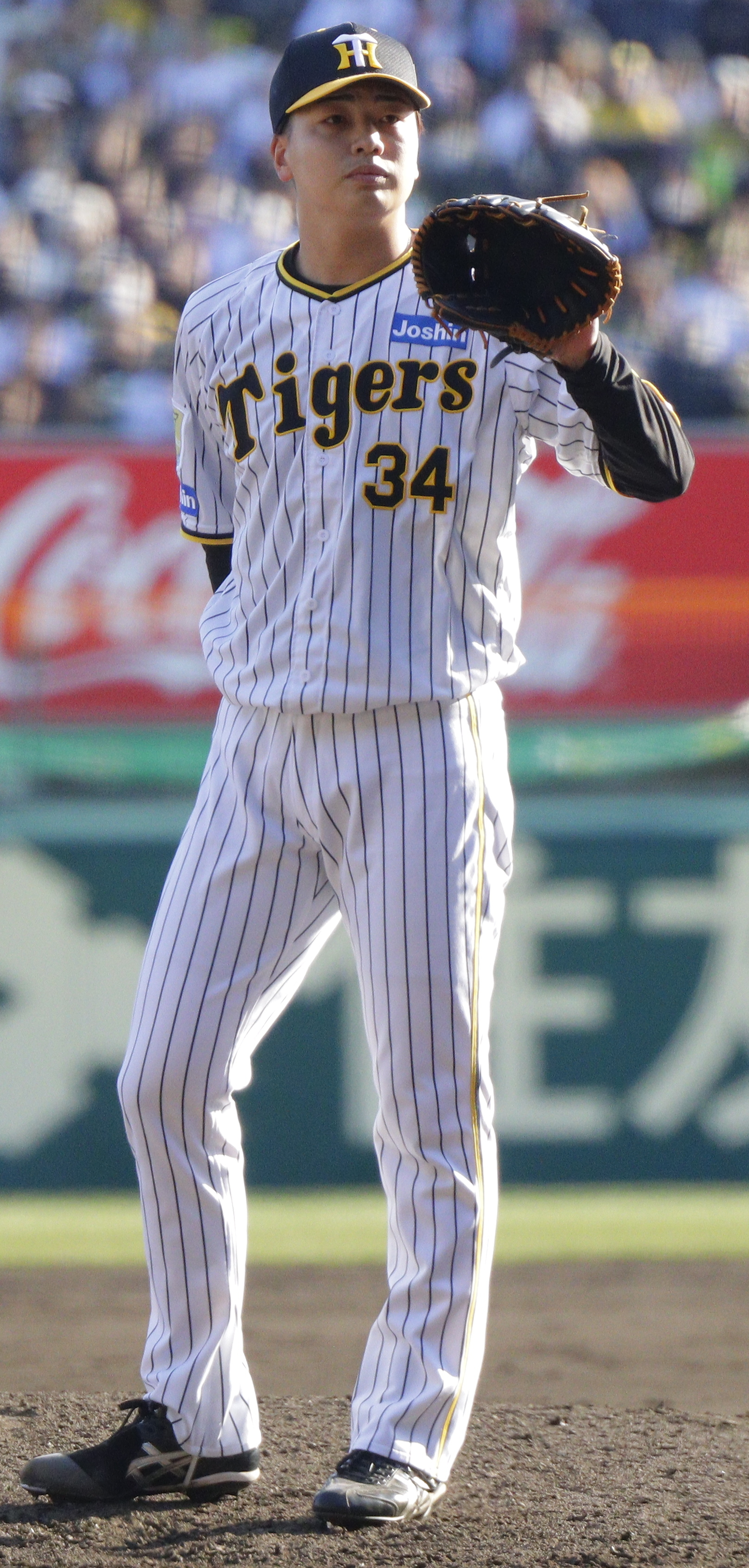
- Pitcher
- Born: September 10, 1996 (age 29); Tsubame, Niigata, Japan
- Batted: Left Threw: Left

NPB debut
- August 23, 2020, for the Orix Buffaloes

Last NPB appearance
- June 14, 2025, for the Hanshin Tigers

Career statistics
- Win–loss record: 3-6
- Earned run average: 3.06
- Strikeouts: 94
- Saves: 4
- Holds: 17
- Stats at Baseball Reference

Teams
- Orix Buffaloes (2019–2023); Hanshin Tigers (2024–2025)

Taisei Urushihara (漆原 大晟, Urushihara Taisei; born September 10, 1996) is a professional Japanese baseball player. He is a pitcher for the Hanshin Tigers of Nippon Professional Baseball (NPB).
