= Sho Gibo =

Japanese baseball player (born 2000)

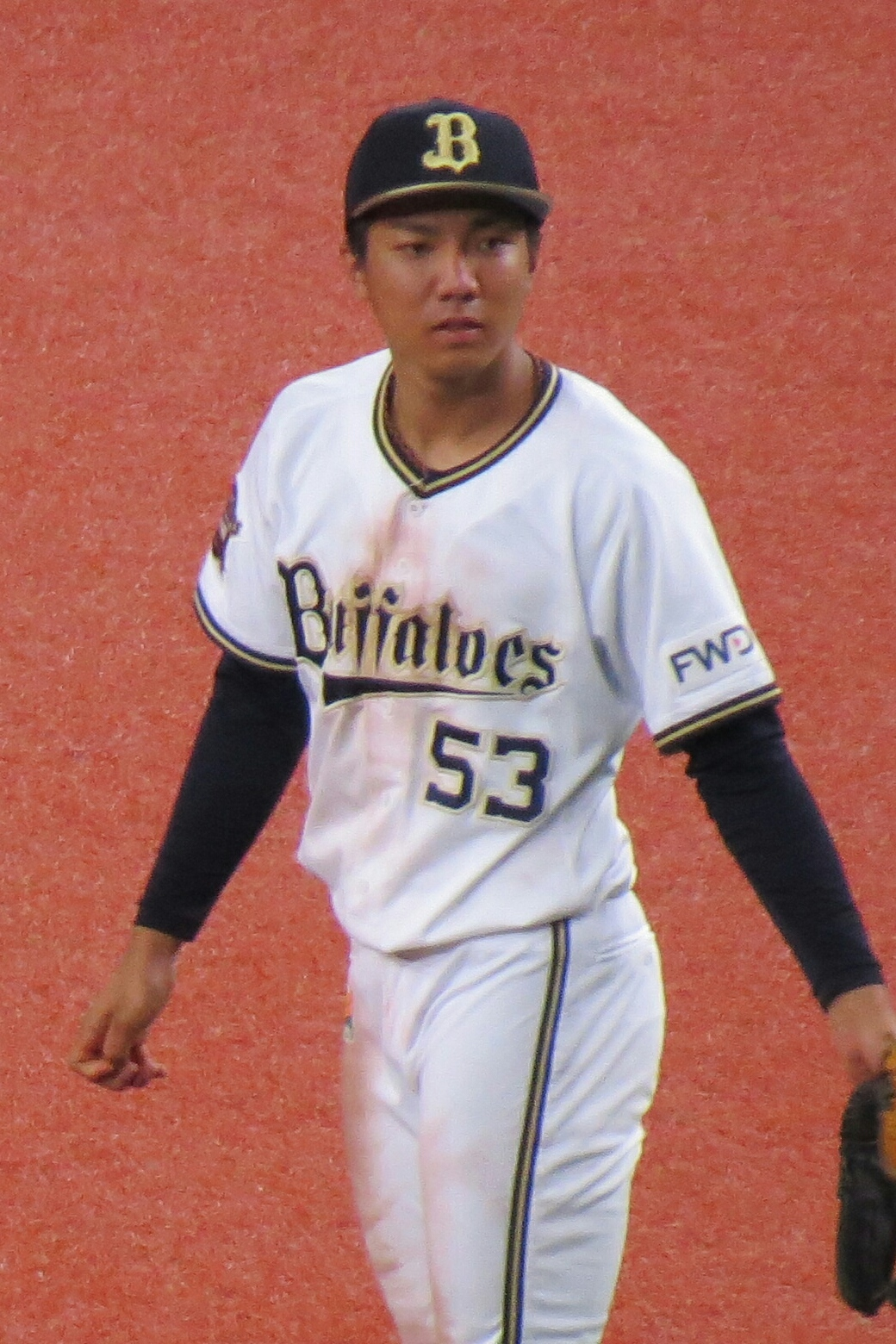

Orix Buffaloes – No. 53
- Infielder
- Born: November 26, 2000 (age 25); Tomigusuku, Okinawa, Japan
- Bats: Left Throws: Right

NPB debut
- September 6, 2019, for the Orix Buffaloes

Career statistics (through April 6, 2022)
- Batting average: .188
- Home runs: 0
- RBIs: 4

Teams
- Orix Buffaloes (2019-present)

Sho Gibo (宜保翔, Gibo Sho; born November 26, 2000 in Tomigusuku, Okinawa, Japan) is a professional Japanese baseball player. He is an infielder for the Orix Buffaloes of Nippon Professional Baseball (NPB).
