= Ryutaro Hatsuki =

Japanese baseball player (born 2000)

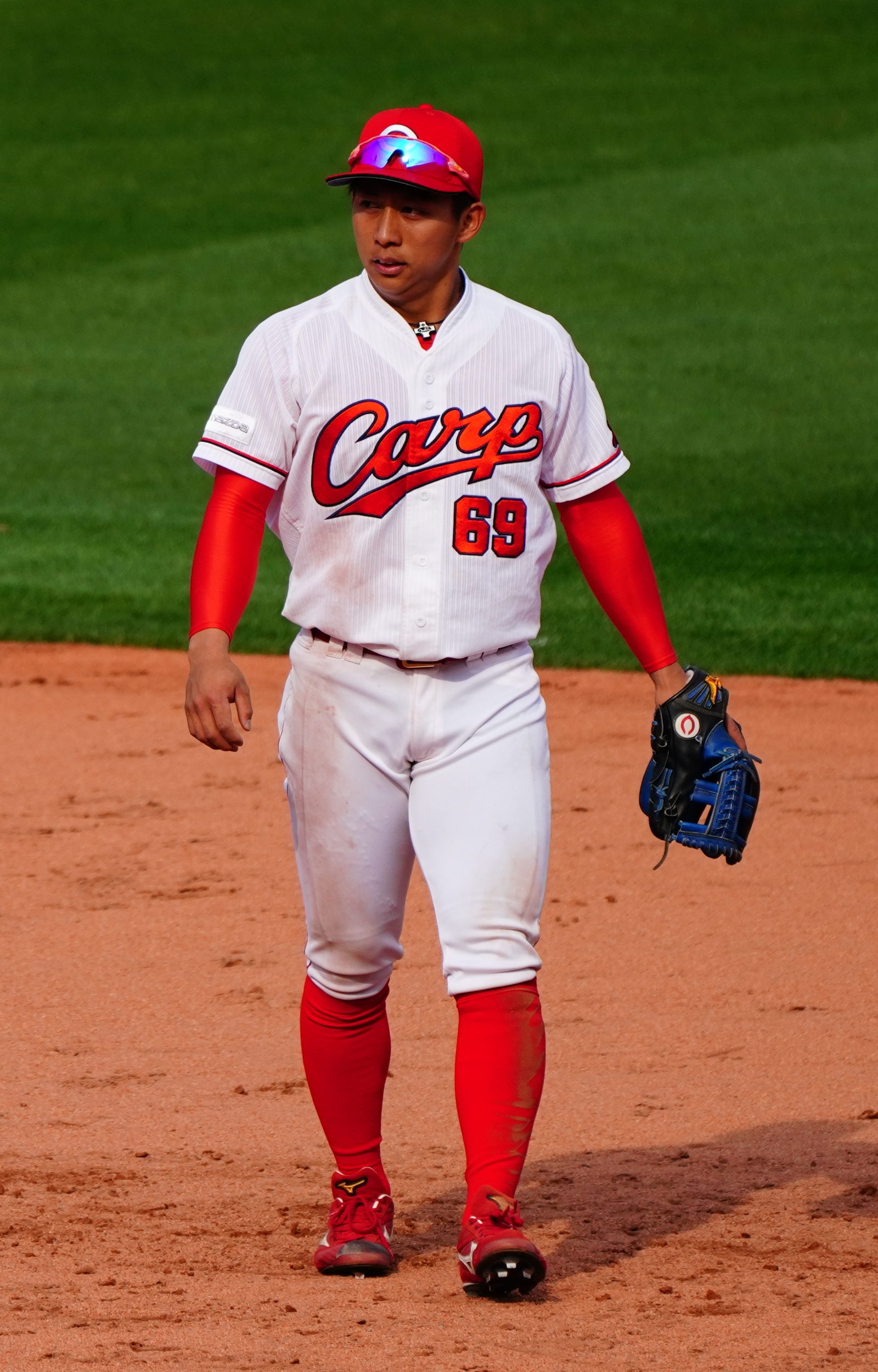
- Infielder
- Born: April 19, 2000 (age 26); Miyazaki, Miyazaki, Japan
- Batted: Left Threw: Right

NPB debut
- August 7, 2020, for the Hiroshima Toyo Carp

Last NPB appearance
- September 15, 2025, for the Hiroshima Toyo Carp

Career statistics
- Batting average: .243
- Hits: 98
- Home runs: 1
- Runs batted in: 34
- Stolen bases: 51
- Stats at Baseball Reference

Teams
- Hiroshima Toyo Carp (2019–2025)

Ryutaro Hatsuki (羽月 隆太郎, Hatsuki Ryutaro; born April 19, 2000 in Miyazaki, Miyazaki, Japan) is a Japanese professional baseball infielder for the Hiroshima Toyo Carp of Nippon Professional Baseball (NPB).

On January 27, 2026, he was arrested for using the designated controlled substance Etomidate. Carp released Hatsuki on February 25.
