= Yu Matsumoto =

Japanese baseball player (born 1995)

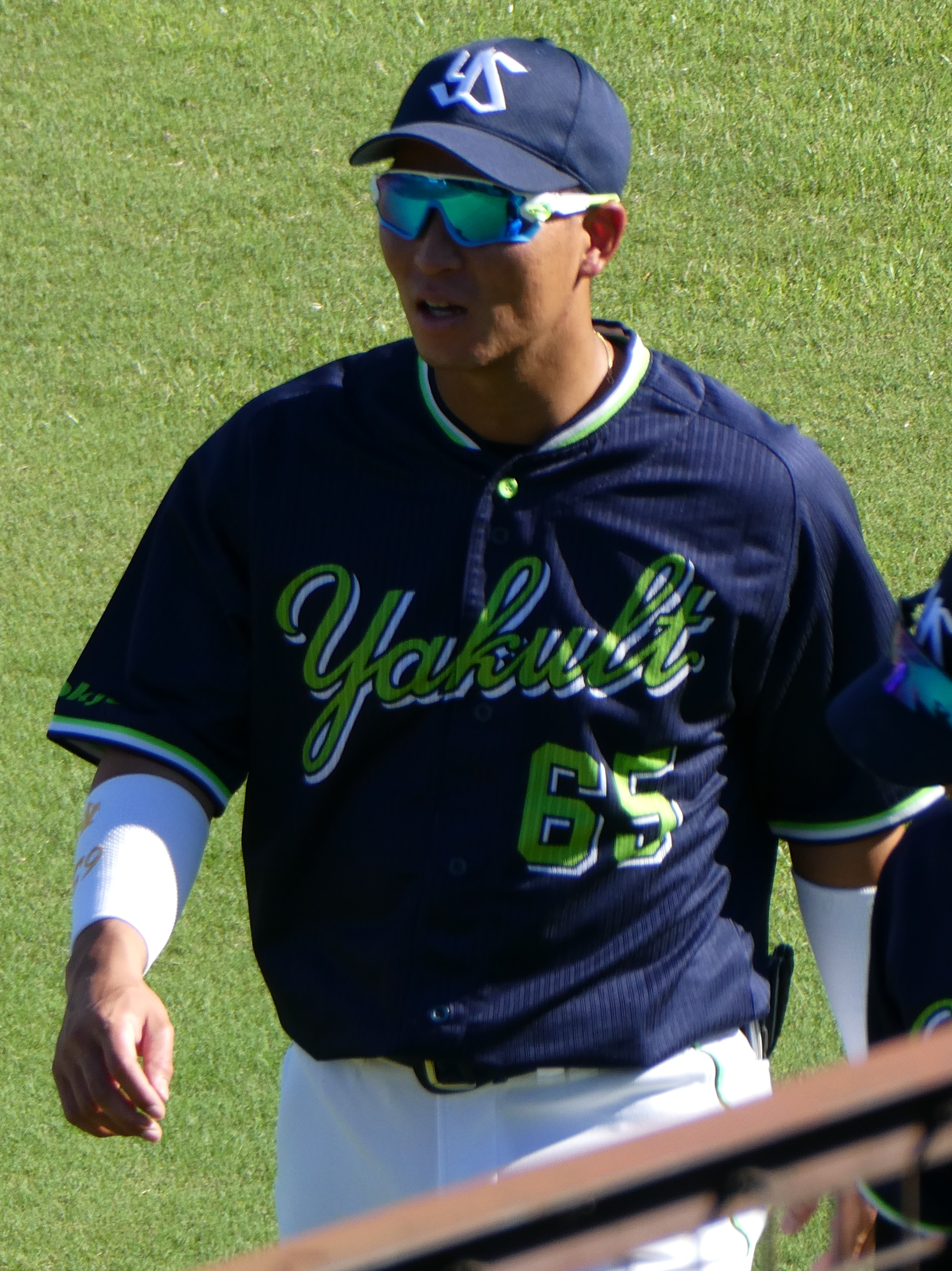
- Matsumoto with the Tokyo Yakult Swallows
- Infielder
- Born: February 5, 1995 (age 31); Kasuya, Fukuoka, Japan
- Batted: Left Threw: Right

NPB debut
- October 4, 2020, for the Tokyo Yakult Swallows

Last NPB appearance
- October 2, 2022, for the Tokyo Yakult Swallows

Career statistics (through 2023 season)
- Batting average: .328
- Hits: 20
- Home runs: 0
- RBIs: 2
- Stolen bases: 1
- Stats at Baseball Reference

Teams
- Tokyo Yakult Swallows (2019–2023)

Yu Matsumoto (松本 友, Matsumoto Yu; born February 5, 1995 in Kasuya, Fukuoka, Japan) is a professional Japanese baseball player. He plays infielder for the Tokyo Yakult Swallows.
