= Daisuke Naoe =

Japanese baseball player (born 2000)

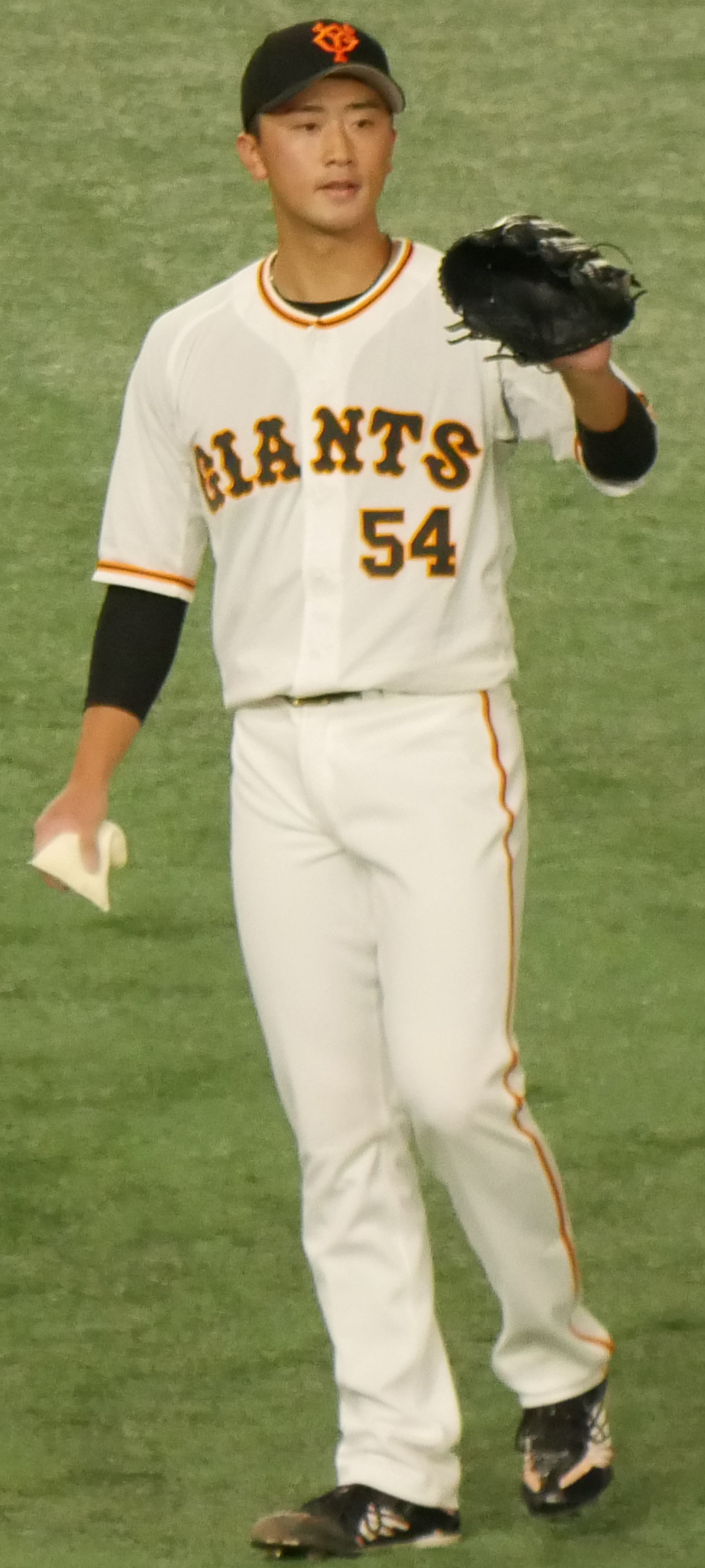
- Pitcher
- Born: June 20, 2000 (age 25); Nagano, Nagano, Japan
- Batted: Right Threw: Right

NPB debut
- August 23, 2020, for the Yomiuri Giants

Last NPB appearance
- May 12, 2023, for the Yomiuri Giants

Career statistics
- Win–loss record: 1–3
- Earned run average: 3.72
- Strikeouts: 42

Teams
- Yomiuri Giants (2020–2025)

Daisuke Naoe (直江 大輔, Naoe Daisuke; born June 20, 2000) is a professional Japanese baseball player. He is a pitcher for the Yomiuri Giants of Nippon Professional Baseball (NPB).
