= Taiga Kamichatani =

Japanese baseball player (born 1996)

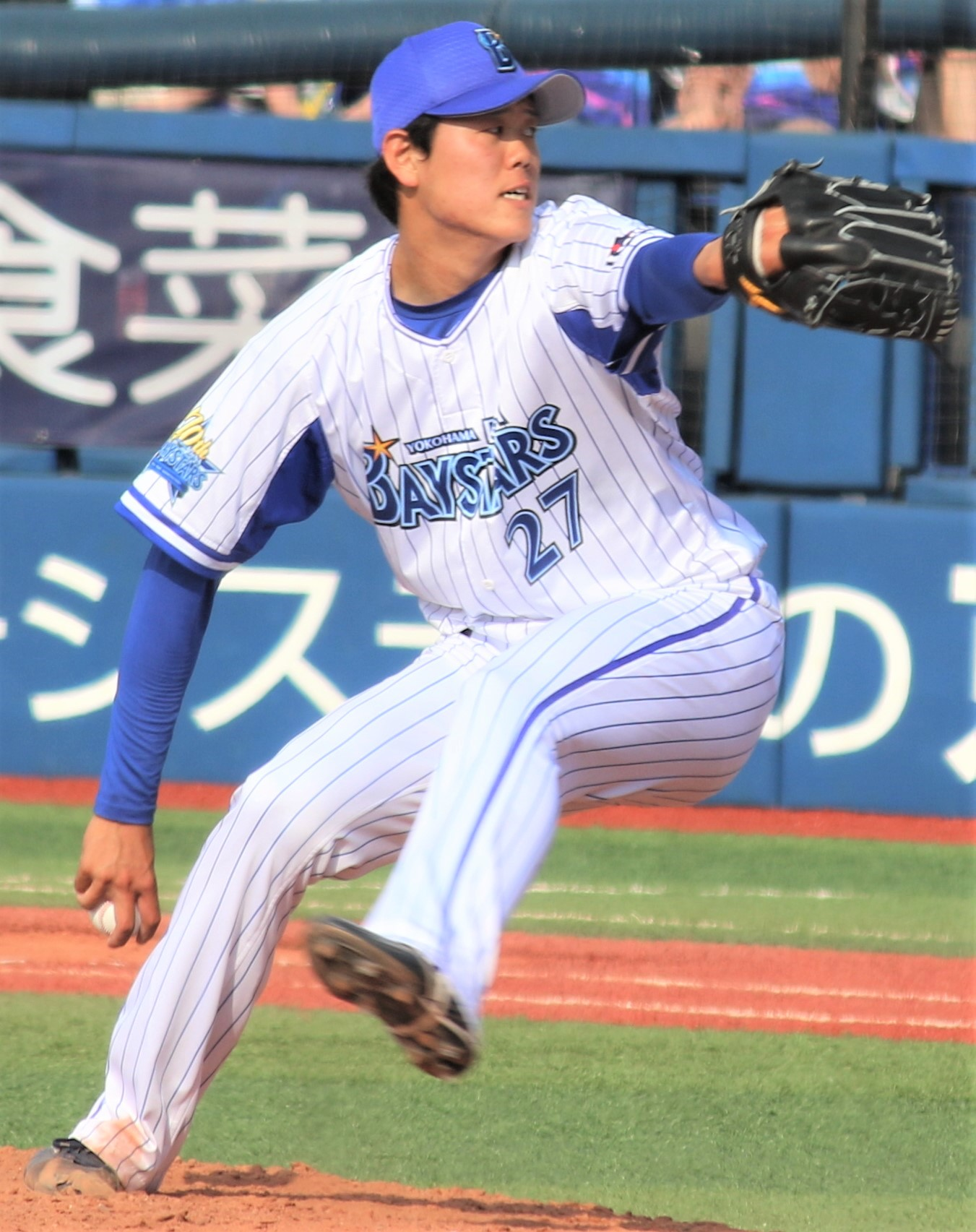
- Kamichatani with the Yokohama DeNA BayStars

Fukuoka SoftBank Hawks – No. 64
- Pitcher
- Born: August 31, 1996 (age 29); Kyoto, Kyoto, Japan
- Bats: Right Throws: Right

NPB debut
- April 2, 2019, for the Yokohama DeNA BayStars

Career statistics (through 2024 season)
- Win–loss record: 20-23
- Earned run average: 4.12
- Strikeouts: 297
- Stats at Baseball Reference

Teams
- Yokohama DeNA BayStars (2019–2024); Fukuoka SoftBank Hawks (2025–present)

Career highlights and awards
- 2x Japan Series champion (2024, 2025)

Taiga Kamichatani (上茶谷 大河, Kamichatani Taiga; born August 31, 1996 in Kyoto, Kyoto, Japan) is a Japanese professional baseball pitcher for the Fukuoka SoftBank Hawks of Nippon Professional Baseball (NPB).
