= 2016 Nippon Professional Baseball draft =

2016 Nippon Professional Baseball Draft
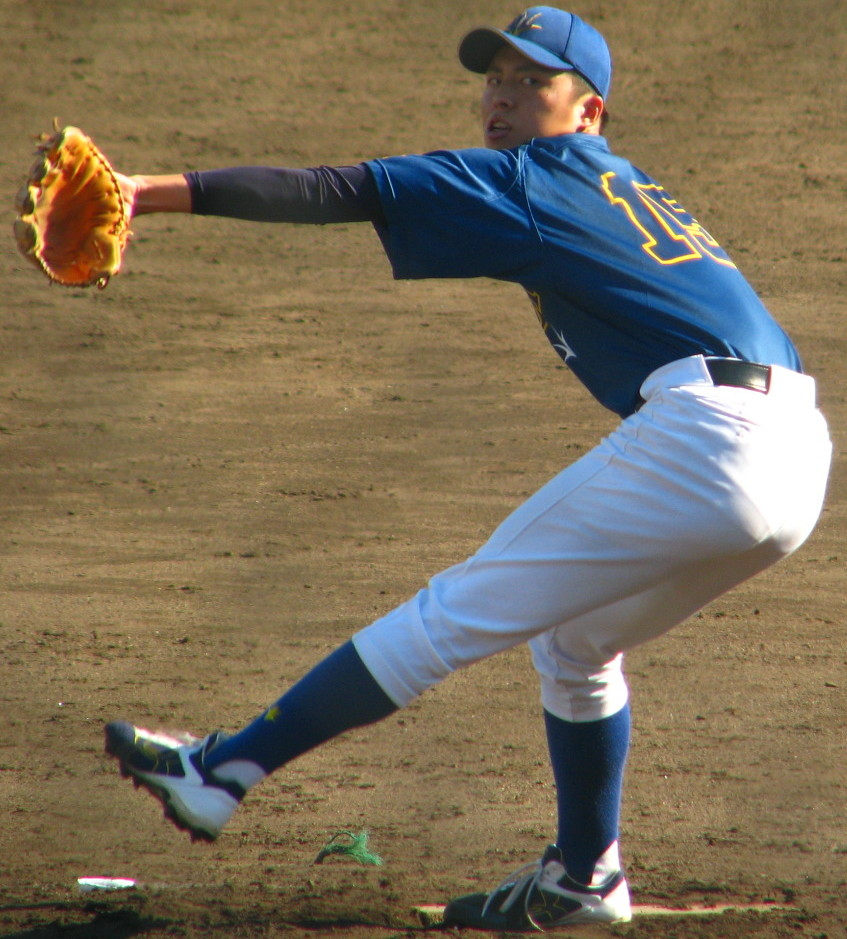
- Seigi Tanaka, who was nominated and a bid lottery for by five teams.

General information
- Sport: Baseball
- Date: October 20, 2016
- Location: Grand Prince Hotel Takanawa, Tokyo
- Networks: TBS (first round), sky-A
- Sponsored by: Taisho Pharmaceutical

Overview
- 115 total selections in 18 (Includes draft for developmental players) rounds
- League: Nippon Professional Baseball
- First round selections: Jumpei Takahashi; Yuya Yanagi

The 2016 Nippon Professional Baseball (NPB) Draft was held on October 20, 2016, for the 52nd time at the Grand Prince Hotel Takanawa to assign amateur baseball players to the NPB. It was arranged with the special cooperation of Taisho Pharmaceutical Co. with official naming rights. The draft was officially called "The Professional Baseball Draft Meeting supported by Lipovitan D".

== Summary ==
Only the first round picks were allowed to be contested with all picks from the second round onward being based on table placing in the 2016 NPB season in a waiver system. Waiver priority was based on inter-league results. As the Pacific League teams came out on top against Central League opposition, Pacific League teams were given preference. From the third round the order was reversed continuing in the same fashion until all picks were exhausted.

Due to Tokyo Yakult Swallows manager Mitsuru Manaka's mistake in the 2015 edition of the draft, losing tickets in the lottery were made blank to avoid confusion with winning tickets emblazoned with "Negotiation Rights Acquired."

87 new players were drafted with a further 28 development players selected.

== First Round Contested Picks ==
	Player name	Position	Teams selected by
First Round	**Seigi Tanaka**	Pitcher	Marines, **Hawks**, Giants, Fighters, Carp
First Round	**Yuya Yanagi**	Pitcher	**Dragons**, Baystars
Second Round	**Chihaya Sasaki**	Pitcher	**Marines**,Giants, Fighters, Carp

- **Bolded** teams indicate who won the right to negotiate contract following a lottery.
- In the first round, **Taisuke Yamaoka** (Pitcher) was selected by the **Buffaloes**, **Shoma Fujihira** (Pitcher) by the **Eagles**, **Naruki Terashima** (Pitcher) by the **Swallows**, **Tatsuya Imai** (Pitcher) by the **Lions**, and **Yusuke Oyama** (Infielder) by the **Tigers** without a bid lottery.
- In the thrird round, **Haruhiro Hamaguchi** (Pitcher) was selected by the **BayStars**, **Naoki Yoshikawa** (Infielder) by the **Giants**, **Mizuki Hori** (Pitcher) by the **Fighters**, and **Takuya Katoh** (Pitcher) by the **Carp** without a bid lottery.
- List of selected players.

== Selected Players ==
Key
*	Player did not sign

- The order of the teams is the order of second round waiver priority.
- **Bolded** After that, a developmental player who contracted as a registered player under control.
- List of selected players.

=== Orix Buffaloes ===
Pick	Player name	Position	Team
#1	Taisuke Yamaoka	Pitcher	Tokyo Gas
#2	Yuta Kuroki	Pitcher	Rissho University
#3	Daisuke Okazaki	Infielder	Hanasaki Tokuharu Senior High School
#4	Yoshinobu Yamamoto	Pitcher	Miyakonojo Senior High School
#5	Keisuke Kobayashi	Pitcher	Nippon Life
#6	Soichiro Yamazaki	Pitcher	Tsuruga Keihi Senior High School
#7	Daisuke Iida	Catcher	Honda Suzuka
#8	Keisuke Sawada	Pitcher	Rikkyo University
#9	Kaoru Nemoto	Pitcher	Kasumigaura High School
Developmental Player Draft
#1	**Chang Yi**	Outfielder	Japan University of Economics
#2	**Tsubasa Sakakibara**	Pitcher	Urawa Gakuin High School
#3	**Fumiya Kanbe**	Pitcher	Rissho University
#4	Kazumasa Sakamoto	Infielder	Ishikawa Million Stars
#5	Katsushi Nakamachi	Catcher	Meiji University

=== Chunichi Dragons ===
Pick	Player name	Position	Team
#1	Yuya Yanagi	Pitcher	Meiji University
#2	Yota Kyoda	Infielder	Nihon University
#3	Masami Ishigaki	Infielder	Sakata South High School
#4	Shotaro Kasahara	Pitcher	Niigata University of Health and Welfare
#5	Kento Fujishima	Pitcher	Toho Senior High School
#6	Taisuke Maruyama	Pitcher	Tokai University
Developmental Player Draft
#1	**Yusuke Kinoshita**	Pitcher	Tokushima Indigo Socks

=== Tohoku Rakuten Golden Eagles ===
Pick	Player name	Position	Team
#1	Shoma Fujihira	Pitcher	Yokohama Senior High School
#2	Takahide Ikeda	Pitcher	Sōka University
#3	Kazuki Tanaka	Outfielder	Rikkyo University
#4	Shu Sugahara	Pitcher	Osaka University of Health and Sport Sciences
#5	Kohei Morihara	Pitcher	Nippon Steel & Sumitomo Steel Hirohata
#6	Keisuke Tsuruta	Pitcher	Teikyo University
#7	Hiroki Nomoto	Pitcher	Sasebo Commercial High School
#8	Tsuyoshi Ishihara	Catcher	Kyoto Shoei High School
#9	Yuhei Takanashi	Pitcher	JX Eneos
#10	Naoto Nishiguchi	Pitcher	Renaiss Health and Medical College
Developmental Player Draft
#1	Kodai Chiba	Pitcher	Hanamaki East High School
#2	Yusuke Minami	Infielder	Meisei University
#3	Takuma Mukaitani	Infielder	Hyogo Blue Sundars
#4	Toshiyasu Kimura	Pitcher	Riseisha College of Medicine and Sport

=== Tokyo Yakult Swallows ===
Pick	Player name	Position	Team
#1	Naruki Terashima	Pitcher	Riseisha Senior High School
#2	Tomoya Hoshi	Pitcher	Meiji University
#3	Yugo Umeno	Pitcher	Kyushusangyo High School
#4	Hikaru Nakao	Pitcher	Nagoya Keizai University
#5	Yudai Koga	Catcher	Meitoku Gijuku Senior High School
#6	Ryusuke Kikusawa	Pitcher	Soso Ritec
Developmental Player Draft
#1	**Hajime Omura**	Catcher	Ishikawa Million Stars

=== Saitama Seibu Lions ===
Pick	Player name	Position	Team
#1	Tatsuya Imai	Pitcher	Sakushin Senior High School
#2	Shunta Nakatsuka	Pitcher	Hakuoh University
#3	Sosuke Genda	Infielder	Toyota
#4	Shohei Suzuki	Outfielder	Shizuoka Senior High School
#5	Katsunori Hirai	Pitcher	Honda Suzuka
#6	Ichiro Tamura	Pitcher	Rikkyo University

=== Hanshin Tigers ===
Pick	Player name	Position	Team
#1	Yusuke Oyama	Infielder	Hakuoh University
#2	Taiki Ono	Pitcher	Fuji University
#3	Hiroto Saiki	Pitcher	Kobe Sumashofu High School
#4	Masumi Hamachi	Pitcher	Fukuoka University Ohori Senior High School
#5	Kento Itohara	Infielder	Nippon Oil
#6	Shungo Fukunaga	Pitcher	Tokushima Indigo Socks
#7	Kenya Nagasaka	Catcher	Tohoku Fukushi University
#8	Kosuke Fujitani	Pitcher	Panasonic

=== Chiba Lotte Marines ===
Pick	Player name	Position	Team
#1	Chihaya Sasaki	Pitcher	J. F. Oberlin University
#2	Tomohito Sakai	Pitcher	Osaka Gas
#3	Takaaki Shima	Pitcher	Tokai University Ichihara Boyo Senior High School
#4	Seiya Dohi	Pitcher	Osaka Gas
#5	Yuki Ariyoshi	Pitcher	Kyushu Mitsubishi
#6	Atsuki Taneichi	Pitcher	Hachinohe Institute of Technology Daiichi Senior High
#7	Yuito Munetsugu	Pitcher	Asia University
Developmental Player Draft
#1	Yoshizumu Yasue	Pitcher	Ishikawa Million Stars
#2	Shota Sugawara	Outfielder	Nihon Wellness sports University

=== Yokohama DeNA BayStars ===
Pick	Player name	Position	Team
#1	Haruhiro Hamaguchi	Pitcher	Kanagawa University
#2	Koya Mizuno	Pitcher	Tokai University Hokkaido
#3	Taiga Matsuo	Infielder	Shugakukan High School
#4	Masaya Kyoyama	Pitcher	Ohmi Senior High School
#5	Seiya Hosokawa	Pitcher	Meishu Hitachi High School
#6	Yuya Onaka	Pitcher	Hiroshima University of Economics
#7	Yukikazu Karino	Infielder	Heisei International University
#8	Takuya Shindoh	Pitcher	JR East
#9	Keita Sano	Infielder	Meiji University
Developmental Player Draft
#1	**Takamasa Kasai**	Pitcher	Shinano Grandserows

=== Fukuoka SoftBank Hawks ===
Pick	Player name	Position	Team
#1	Seigi Tanaka	Pitcher	Sōka University
#2	Yuto Furuya	Pitcher	Koryo High School
#3	Ryuhei Kuki	Catcher	Syugakukan High School
#4	Masaki Mimori	Infielder	Aomori Yamada High School
Developmental Player Draft
#1	Shogo Omoto	Outfielder	Teikyo Dai-go High School
#2	**Hiroki Hasegawa**	Pitcher	Shotoku Gakuen High School
#3	Tsubasa Tashiro	Outfielder	Hachinohe Gakuin High School
#4	Kosuke Moriyama	Pitcher/Infielder	Fujisawa Shoryo High School
#5	Rikuya Shimizu	Outfielder	Kyoto International High School
#6	Ryugen Matsumoto	Infielder	Sotoku High School

=== Yomiuri Giants ===
Pick	Player name	Position	Team
#1	Naoki Yoshikawa	Infielder	Chukyo Gakuin University
#2	Seishu Hatake	Pitcher	Kinki University
#3	Tappei Tanioka	Pitcher	Toshiba
#4	Shun Ikeda	Pitcher	Yamaha
#5	Hosei Takata	Pitcher	Soshi Gakuen High School
#6	Ryusei Ohe	Pitcher	Nisho Gakusha High School
#7	Liao Jen Lei	Pitcher	Okayama Kyosei High School
Developmental Player Draft
#1	Suguru Takai	Infielder	Niigata Albirex Baseball Club
#2	**Shuhei Katoh**	Outfielder	Iwata Higashi High School
#3	Motohito Yamakawa	Pitcher	Hyogo Blue Sandars
#4	**Koki Sakamoto**	Pitcher	Kwansei Gakuin University
#5	Seiya Matsubara	Outfielder	Meisei University
#6	Ryutaro Takayama	Catcher	Kyushu Sangyo University
#7	**Hayato Horioka**	Pitcher	Aomori Yamada High School
#8	Yusuke Matsuzawa	Outfielder	Kagawa Olive Guyners

=== Hokkaido Nippon-Ham Fighters ===
Pick	Player name	Position	Team
#1	Mizuki Hori	Pitcher	Hiroshima Shinjo Gakuen High School
#2	Kazunari Ishii	Infielder	Waseda University
#3	Kazuki Takara	Pitcher	Kyushu Sangyo University
#4	Keisuke Moriyama	Outfielder	Senshu University
#5	Yuki Takayama	Pitcher	Osaka Tōin High School
#6	Yujiro Yamaguchi	Pitcher	Riseisha Gakuen High School
#7	Takuya Kori	Catcher	Teikyo University
#8	Taisho Tamai	Pitcher	Nippon Steel & Sumitomo Metal Kazusa Magic
#9	Junnosuke Imai	Infielder	Chukyo High School

=== Hiroshima Toyo Carp ===
Pick	Player name	Position	Team
#1	Takuya Katoh	Pitcher	Keio University
#2	Koya Takahashi	Pitcher	Hanasaki Tokuharu High School
#3	Hiroki Tokoda	Pitcher	Chubu Gakuin University
#4	Shogo Sakakura	Catcher	Tokai University Daisan Senior High
#5	Makoto Adwuwa	Pitcher	Matsuyama Seiryo High School
#6	Ryota Nagai	Pitcher	Tsukuba Shuei High School

Preceded by **2015**	**Nippon Professional Baseball draft**	Succeeded by **2017**
