= Onaka =

Onaka may refer to:

- Onaka (grape), a hybrid grape cultivar
- Onaka, South Dakota, United States
- Ōnaka Station, Gujō, Gifu Prefecture, Japan

== People with the surname ==
- Yūya Onaka (尾仲 祐哉, born 1995), Japanese footballer
