= Taiki Ono =

Japanese baseball player (born 1994)

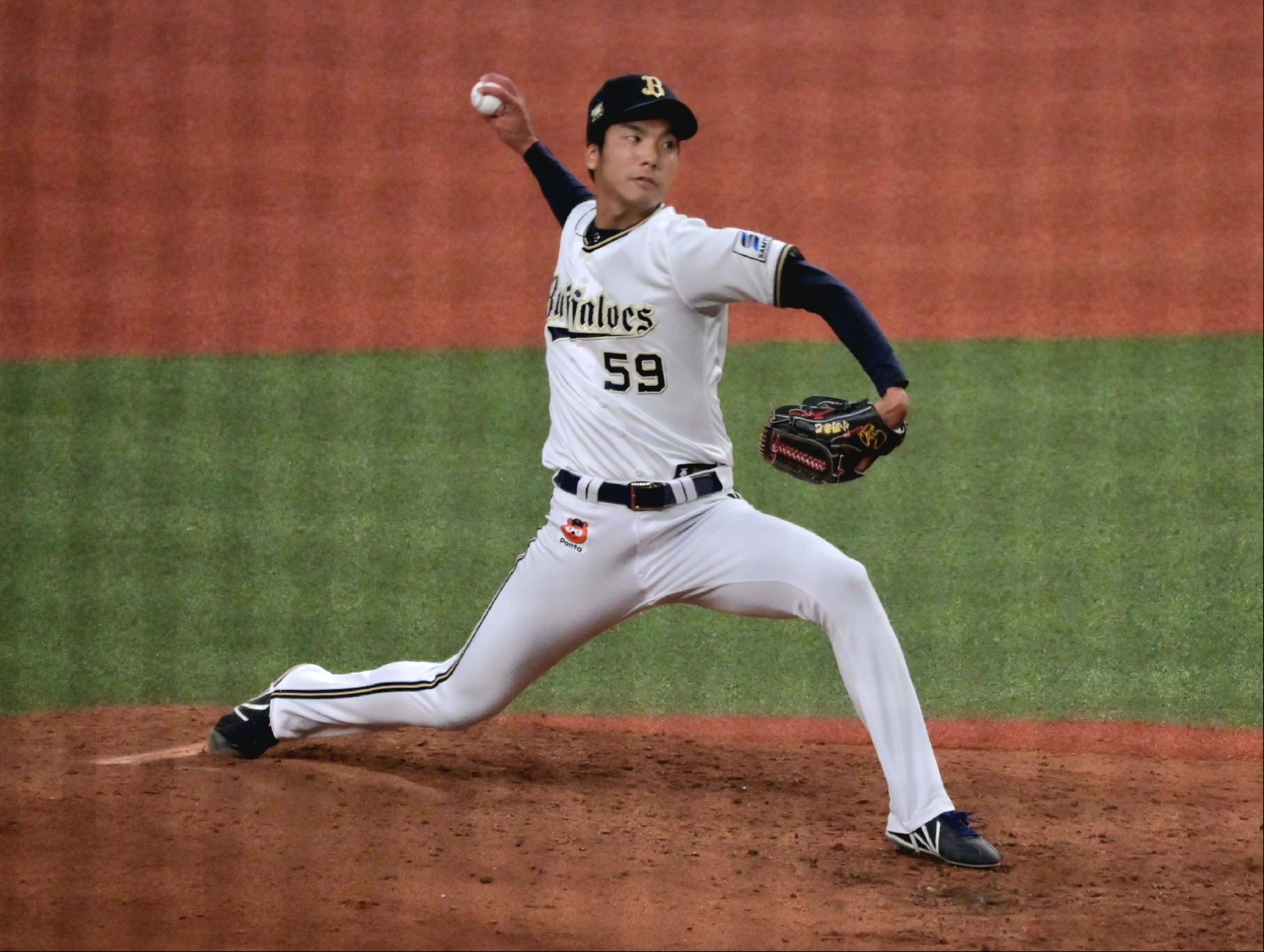

Orix Buffaloes – No. 130
- Pitcher
- Born: May 30, 1995 (age 30); Kitakyushu, Fukuoka
- Bats: Right Throws: Right

NPB debut
- May 21, 2017, for the Hanshin Tigers

Career statistics (through 2024 season)
- Win–loss record: 9–15
- Earned run average: 4.68
- Strikeouts: 186
- Stats at Baseball Reference

Teams
- Hanshin Tigers (2017 – 2022); Orix Buffaloes (2023 – present)

Taiki Ono (小野 泰己, Ono, Taiki; born May 30, 1994) is a Japanese professional baseball pitcher who currently plays for the Orix Buffaloes of Nippon Professional Baseball.

== Early baseball career ==
Taiki started playing softball in 1st grade, and went to play for the Koujaku Junior High softball team. Upon entering Orio Aishin High, he became the baseball team's ace pitcher in his 2nd year, but his team never made it to Koshien. With a desire to play in the professional leagues upon graduating high school, he submitted his application for the autumn professional baseball draft. But when none of the 12 teams drafted him, he decided to enter Fuji University in Iwate.

He was a regular starter for his team as they participated in the Northern Tohoku University Baseball League. In his 3rd year, he won all of his starts, and grabbed the league's title for best pitcher with an untarnished ERA of 0.00. The following year, he finished with a 0.45 ERA, won the league MVP and best nine award, and helped his team win the championships. He left the league with a 12–1 win–loss record.

== Hanshin Tigers ==
He was the Tiger's 2nd round pick during the 2016 NPB draft. He signed a 70 million yen contract with Hanshin, for an estimated annual salary of 12 million yen. He was assigned jersey number 28, which formerly belonged to reliever Shinobu Fukuhara who retired in 2016, and is currently working as a pitching coach for Hanshin's farm league team.

2017

Along with fellow draftees Kento Itohara and Yūsuke Ōyama, Taiki joined the main roster's spring training camp. His 150 km/h fastball was highly regarded by coaches, so he remained with the main roster until the camp ended. However, due to his lackluster performance during the pre-season games (3 games, 6.55 ERA), he was sent back to the farms before opening day.

He debuted on May 21 match against the Yakult Swallows in Meiji Jingu, where he pitted against fellow uni-drafted rookie Tomoya Hoshi. While he gave up 4 earned runs including 2 home runs and didn't grab the win, Hanshin won the match when they took back the lead on the 7th.

== Orix Buffaloes ==
In 2023, he moves to the Orix Buffaloes in a free trade.

== Playing Style ==
With an overhand delivery, he throws a four-seam fastball averaging 145 km/h (tops out at 151 km/h), a forkball clocked at low 130s, an occasional curveball, and a solid slider that ranges from 120 to 140 km/h. His fastest pitch ever recorded was a 153 km/h fastball, thrown during spring camp training.

== Trivia ==
His father, being an avid fan of horse racing, named him "Taiki" (泰己) after the famous racehorse Taiki Blizzard whose total earnings exceeded 1 billion yen back in the 1990s.

== Career statistics ==
- NPB Statistics
- Nippon Professional Baseball career statistics from JapaneseBaseball.com
- Career statistics from Baseball Reference (Minors)
