= Naruki =

- Gender: Male

Origin
- Origin: Japanese
- Meaning: Different meanings depending on the kanji used

Naruki (written: 成樹, 成輝 or 尚瑠輝) is a masculine Japanese given name. Notable people with the name include:

- Naruki Doi (土井 成樹; born 1980), Japanese professional wrestler
- Naruki Matsukawa (松川 尚瑠輝; born 1991), Japanese actor
- Naruki Terashima (寺島 成輝; born 1998), Japanese baseball player
