= Masaki Mimori =

Japanese baseball player (born 1999)

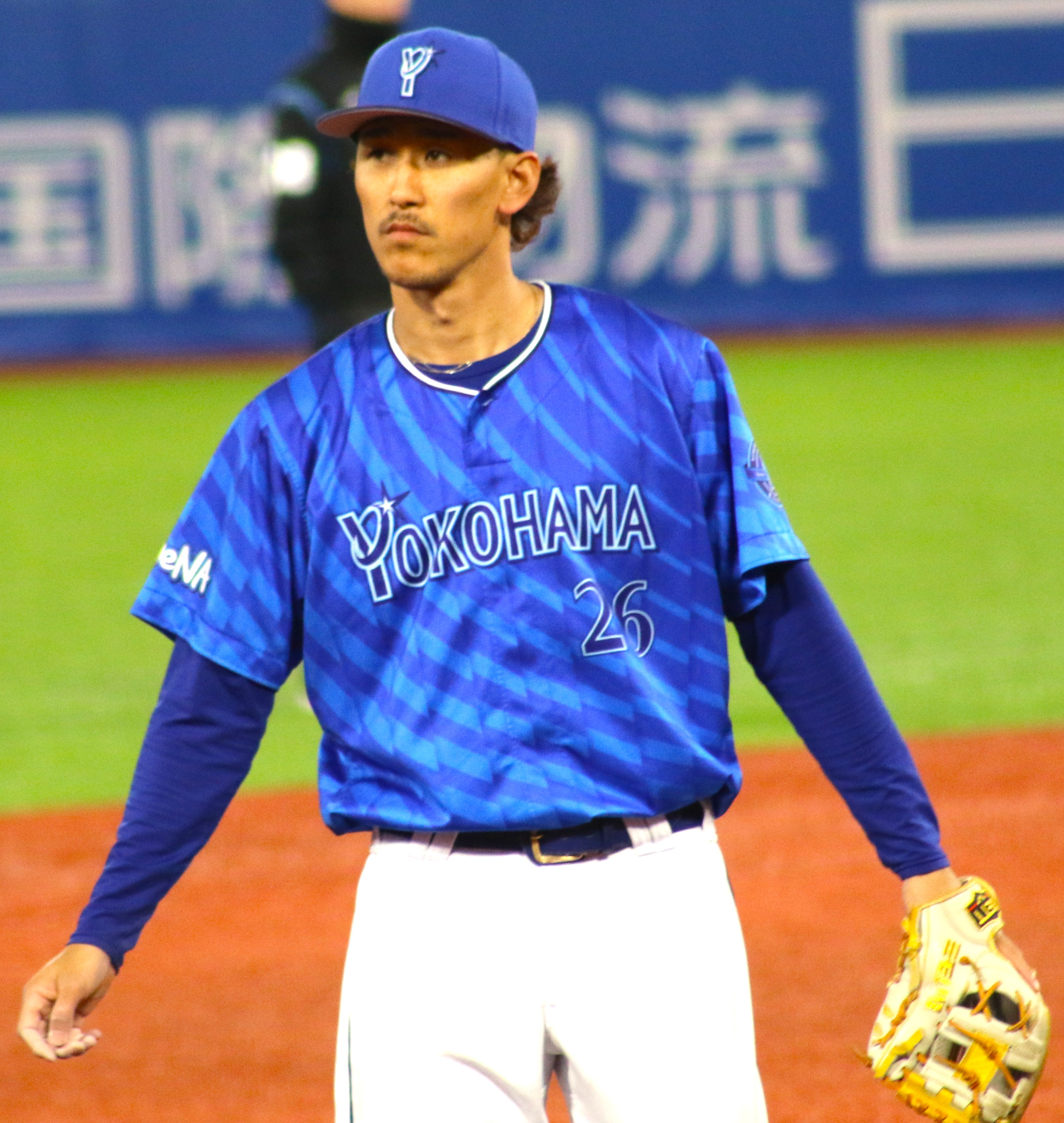
- Mimori with the Yokohama DeNA BayStars.

Yokohama DeNA BayStars – No. 26
- Infielder
- Born: February 21, 1999 (age 27); Koshigaya, Saitama, Japan
- Bats: Left Throws: Right

NPB debut
- April 18, 2019, for the Fukuoka SoftBank Hawks

NPB statistics (through 2023 season)
- Batting average: .250
- Home runs: 14
- RBIs: 80
- Stolen bases: 54
- Stats at Baseball Reference

Teams
- Fukuoka SoftBank Hawks (2017–2024); Yokohama DeNA BayStars (2025–present)

Career highlights and awards
- 1× Western League Batting Leader Award (2020); 1× Western League OBP Leader Award (2020)

Masaki Mimori (三森 大貴, Mimori Masaki; born February 21, 1999, in Koshigaya, Saitama) is a Japanese professional baseball Infielder for the Yokohama DeNA BayStars of Nippon Professional Baseball (NPB). He has previously played in NPB for the Fukuoka SoftBank Hawks.

== Early baseball career ==
Mimori participated in the 3rd grade spring the 88th Japanese High School Baseball Invitational Tournament as a player of the Aomori Yamada High School with Hayato Horioka.

== Professional career ==
On October 20, 2016, Mimori was drafted by the Fukuoka SoftBank Hawks as their fourth and final pick in the 2016 Nippon Professional Baseball draft.

In the 2017 & 2018 seasons, Mimori played in informal matches against the Shikoku Island League Plus's teams and other amateur baseball teams as a member of the Hawks' Western League team.

On April 18, 2019, Mimori made his Pacific League debut against the Chiba Lotte Marines, recording his first hit and RBI hit on April 21. In the 2019 season, Mimori played 24 games in the Pacific League.

In the 2020 season, Mimori played 24 games in the Pacific League, winning the Western League Batting Leader Award and Western League OBP Leader Award in the Western League with a batting average of .323 and an on-base percentage of .397.

In the 2021 season, Mimori was registered with the first team on June 4 and was named to the starting lineup as the leadoff hitter and second baseman for interleague play against the Hanshin Tigers on the same day. He recorded his fifth consecutive hit from the next day's game on the 5th. On June 10 against the Hiroshima Toyo Carp, he was active, recording a multi-hit game with four hits. He made 86 appearances and established himself as a regular player at second base, finishing the season with a .249 batting average, 20 RBI, and 16 stolen bases. On December 8, Mimori renewed his contract for three times his estimated annual salary of 24 million yen, up from 7 million yen.

On April 5, 2022, Mimori recorded his first home run against the Orix Buffaloes. On July 10, Mimori broke his left thumb, forcing him to undergo rehabilitation. He was diagnosed with a three-month recovery period, but returned to play on August 16, against the Saitama Seibu Lions, two months earlier than expected. However, on the 19th, he tested positive for COVID-19 and was struck from the first team registration according to regulations. He returned on September 1 against the Chiba Lotte Marines, and he recorded a leadoff home run against the Chiba Lotte Marines in the final game of the regular season, where the Hawks lost the Pacific League pennant race on a tiebreaker to the Orix Buffaloes. He finished the season with a .257 batting average, nine home runs, and 36 runs batted in in 102 games, despite a broken bone and a COVID-19 outing.

On November 27, 2022, Mimori announced his decision to change his uniform number from 68 to 13 beginning with the 2023 season. He replied that he changed his uniform number to 13 because it was the number he had when he was playing baseball with his older brother, when he was in the third grade, and he had a special attachment to it because he especially enjoyed playing baseball at that time.

In 2023 season, Mimori primarily played as a starter at second base, scoring three runs on three hits in a game against the Tohoku Rakuten Golden Eagles on August 10. He also hit his fifth home run on September 13 against the Saitama Seibu Lions. Mimori played 102 games, and finished the season with a .260 batting average, a 5 home runs, a 14 stolen bases, and a 21 RBI. However, in the first stage of the postseason's 2023 Pacific League Climax Series, he failed to show his potential, making an error in Game 1 and retiring in Game 3 after being hit on the back of the head while defending.
