= Masami Ishigaki =

Japanese baseball player (born 1998)

Masami Ishigaki 石垣 雅海 石垣 勝海
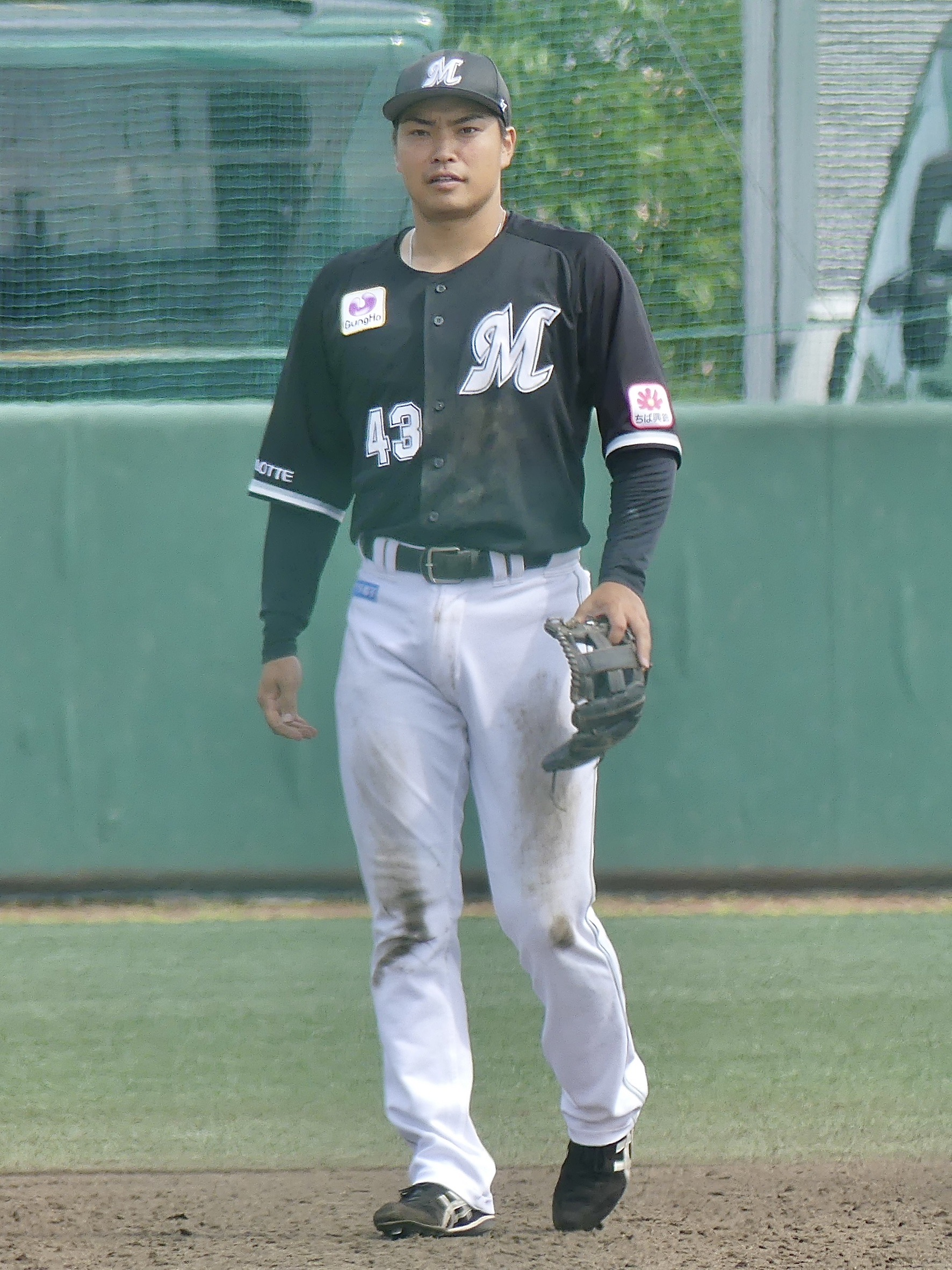

Chiba Lotte Marines – No. 43
- Infielder
- Born: 21 September 1998 (age 27); Sakata, Yamagata
- Bats: Right Throws: Right

NPB debut
- 4 October, 2017, for the Chunichi Dragons

NPB statistics (through 2020 season)
- Batting average: .118
- Home runs: 1
- Runs batted in: 2
- Stats at Baseball Reference

Teams
- Chunichi Dragons (2017–2024); Chiba Lotte Marines (2025–present)

Masami Ishigaki (石垣 勝海, Ishigaki Masami; born September 21, 1998) is a Japanese professional baseball infielder for the Chiba Lotte Marines in Japan's Nippon Professional Baseball.

== Early career ==
Ishigaki started playing baseball in his third year with Kamejiro Elementary School. In his senior year in middle school, Ishigaki was selected for the Tohoku regional representative team. In spring of his first year at South Sakata High School he became the regular third baseman for the team and in fall of the same year, he switched to fielding at short-stop. In spring of his second year he was put in the outfield but returned to short stop in spring of his senior year.

Through his high school career he was not able to play at the summer koshien tournament with the best result being a semi-final appearance in the Tohoku prefectural tournament.

On 20 October 2016, Ishigaki was selected as the 3rd draft pick for the Chunichi Dragons at the 2016 NPB Draft and on 22 November signed a provisional contract with a ¥50,000,000 sign-on bonus and a ¥5,400,000 yearly salary.

== Professional career ==
=== Chunichi Dragons ===
==== 2017 ====
Ishigaki started his career in the Western League farm team playing mostly at third-base where he hit .197 with 3 homeruns in 60 games.

On 4 October, Ishigaki made his professional debut, starting at third base, batting 7th where he struck out 3 times in 3 at bats.

==== 2018 ====
On 12 July, Ishigaki was selected as a Dragon's representative in the 2018 Fresh All-Stars game where he hit a backscreen homerun as well as capturing MVP honours.

On 19 October, it was announced that Ishigaki would be playing the 2018 Asia Winter Baseball League for the Western League selection however he was injured in the lead up and replaced by Wataru Takamatsu.

He finished the 2018 Western League season slashing .183/.256/.234 with one homerun having played 100 games.

==== 2019 ====
Ishigaki started the 2019 season on the farm where he captured monthly MVP honours for the month of June after hitting .345 with 3 homeruns and 7 RBIs.

On 21 August, Ishigaki was promoted to the first team and on the same day struck his first professional hit as a pinch-hitter against Yomiuri Giants ace, Tomoyuki Sugano. At the season's end, Ishigaki received a pay rise of ¥1,200,000 after playing in 15 top team games.

== Playing Style ==
Ishigaki hits for power with quick bat speed, can throw over 100 meters and can run 50 meters in 5.9 seconds. He has likened himself to and idolises Tokyo Yakult Swallows' triple crown man, Tetsuto Yamada.
