= Keisuke Kobayashi =

Japanese baseball player

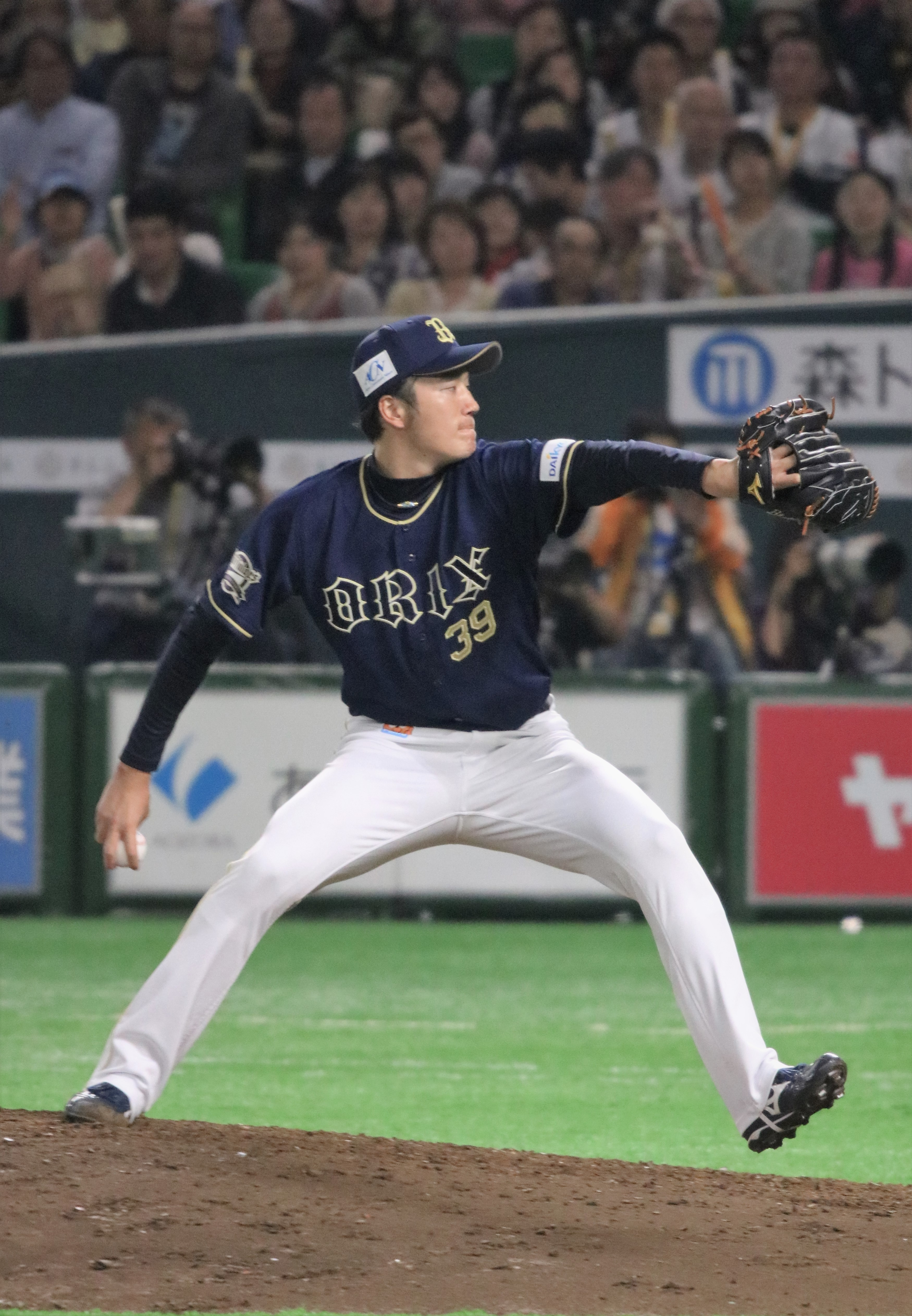
- Kobayashi with the Orix Buffaloes

Oisix Niigata Albirex – No. 19
- Pitcher
- Born: November 2, 1992 (age 33); Brussels, Belgium
- Bats: Right Throws: Right

NPB debut
- May 13, 2017, for the Orix Buffaloes

NPB statistics (through 2023 season)
- Win–loss record: 2–4
- Earned run average: 4.13
- Strikeouts: 108
- Stats at Baseball Reference

Teams
- Orix Buffaloes (2017–2020); Hanshin Tigers (2021–2023)

Keisuke Kobayashi (小林 慶祐, Kobayashi, Keisuke; born November 2, 1992) is a Japanese professional baseball pitcher for the Oisix Niigata Albirex of the Baseball Challenge League (BCL). He has previously played in Nippon Professional Baseball (NPB) for the Orix Buffaloes and Hanshin Tigers.

== Early baseball career ==
Born in Brussels to Japanese parents, his family moved back to their hometown in Sakura, Chiba when Keisuke was 2 after his father's work assignment in Belgium was finished. He started playing little league baseball for Aosuge Elementary School, and continued as a pitcher for Yachiyo Shoin High but his school never made it past the prefectural tournaments.

He enrolled in a business course in Tokyo University of Information Sciences and regularly pitched in the Chiba Prefecture University Baseball League. He became the ace pitcher in his 3rd year and led his team to win the league championships by topping the league in wins (5) and also got awarded Best Nine. They made it to the 2013 National Collegiate Baseball Championship tournament but did not make it past the first round when he allowed 3 runs from the opponent. He also topped the league in wins in his final year with 6.

When he went undrafted after college, he joined Nihon Seimei to play in the industrial leagues. In 2015, he helped his team win their 3rd championship in the Intercity Baseball Tournament and won the MVP award for only giving up 1 run in 4 games and 12 innings.

== Professional career ==
=== Orix Buffaloes ===
Kobayashi was the Orix Buffaloes' 5th round pick during the 2016 Nippon Professional Baseball draft. He signed a 40 million yen contract with Orix, for an estimated annual salary of 10 million yen. He was assigned jersey number 39.

2017

He debuted as a 7th inning reliever in the May 13 match against the Lions in Kyocera dome, and gave away 2 runs in one inning. After that shaky start, he did not get another outing until the bullpen was depleted in a 10-inning deadlock against the Swallows on May 31. He held the Swallows scoreless and earned his first win when the Buffaloes hit the walk-off run. He continued to appear as a middle reliever in the following months, until he sustained an injury from a batted liner that hit his right temple on September 30. He collapsed on the mound while bleeding, and an ambulance had to be brought inside Kyocera Dome to rush him to the hospital. While CT scan results did not show any anomalies in his skull or eye, he still needed 8 stitches to close the wound that resulted from the impact. This outing ended his season and he finished with 3.98 ERA, 2-1 and 1 hold in 35 games.

2018 He spent most of the season pitching in the Phoenix League (farms), and only had 7 outings with the main squad.

2019 He appeared in 20 games as a reliever, and finished with 3 holds, 2 loses and a 5.71 ERA.

2020 He had 7 outings with the main squad before he was suddenly traded to the Hanshin Tigers on August 28 in exchange for lefty pitcher Yuya Iida. This happened after team manager Norifumi Nishimura stepped down from his post after the Buffaloes fell to the bottom of the rankings with 16-33, and was replaced by farm manager Satoshi Nakajima on August 21.

=== Hanshin Tigers ===
2020 He had 2 scoreless outings as a reliever in his first season with the Tigers main squad.

== Career statistics ==
- NPB Statistics
