= Yūsuke Kinoshita =

Japanese baseball player (1993–2021)

Yūsuke Kinoshita 木下雄介
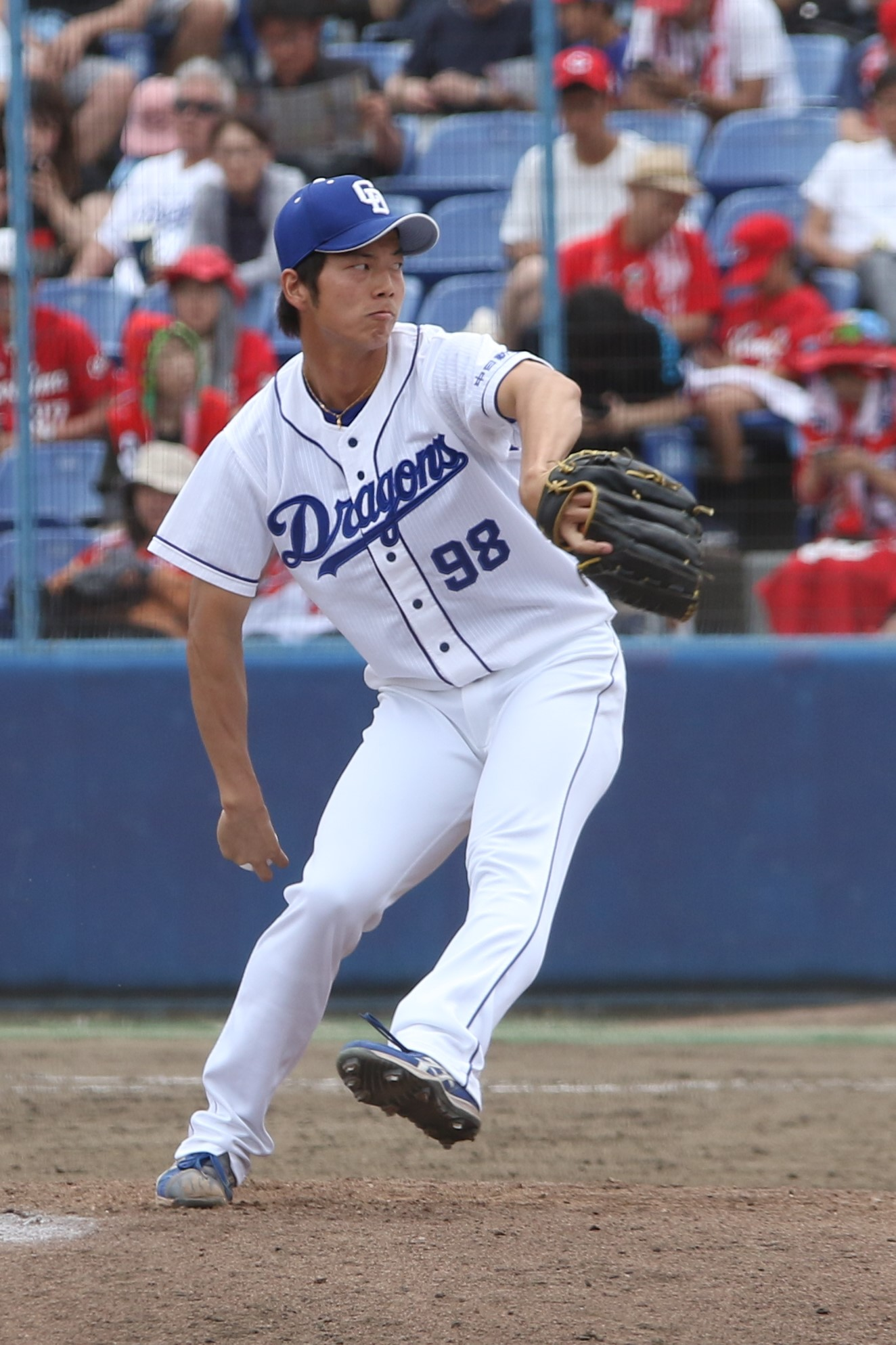
- Kinoshita pitching for the Dragons in 2019
- Pitcher
- Born: 10 October 1993; Hirano-ku, Osaka, Japan
- Died: 3 August 2021 (aged 27); Nagoya, Aichi, Japan
- Batted: Right Threw: Right

NPB debut
- 15 April 2018, for the Chunichi Dragons

Last NPB appearance
- 24 October 2020, for the Chunichi Dragons

NPB statistics
- Win–loss record: 0–0
- Innings pitched: 40.2
- Earned run average: 4.87
- Strikeouts: 48
- Stats at Baseball Reference

Teams
- Chunichi Dragons (2017–2021)

Yūsuke Kinoshita (木下雄介, Kinoshita Yūsuke; 10 October 1993 – 3 August 2021) was a Japanese professional baseball player. He was a pitcher for the Chunichi Dragons of Nippon Professional Baseball.

Kinoshita began his professional career in 2015 with the Tokushima Indigo Socks of the Shikoku Island League Plus. In June 2016, Kinoshita played for a team of All-Stars from that league which visited the United States and played against teams from the Can-Am League and the Cuban National Team.

On 20 October 2016, Kinoshita was selected as the 1st round development draft pick by the Chunichi Dragons at the 2016 NPB Draft and on 9 November signed a provisional contract with a ¥2,000,000 sign-on bonus and a ¥3,000,000 yearly salary.

On 23 March 2018, Kinoshita was upgraded to a fully rostered contract and presented with the number 98.

Kinoshita collapsed due to cardiopulmonary arrest on 6 July 2021, during rehabilitation training on his right shoulder at Nagoya Stadium and was rushed to the hospital, where he was put on a ventilator. He died without regaining consciousness on 3 August 2021. There was some media speculation that his death was connected to his having received his first dose of a COVID-19 vaccine eight days prior to his collapse, but no such causal link has been established.
