= Taisuke Maruyama =

Japanese baseball player

Taisuke Maruyama 丸山泰資
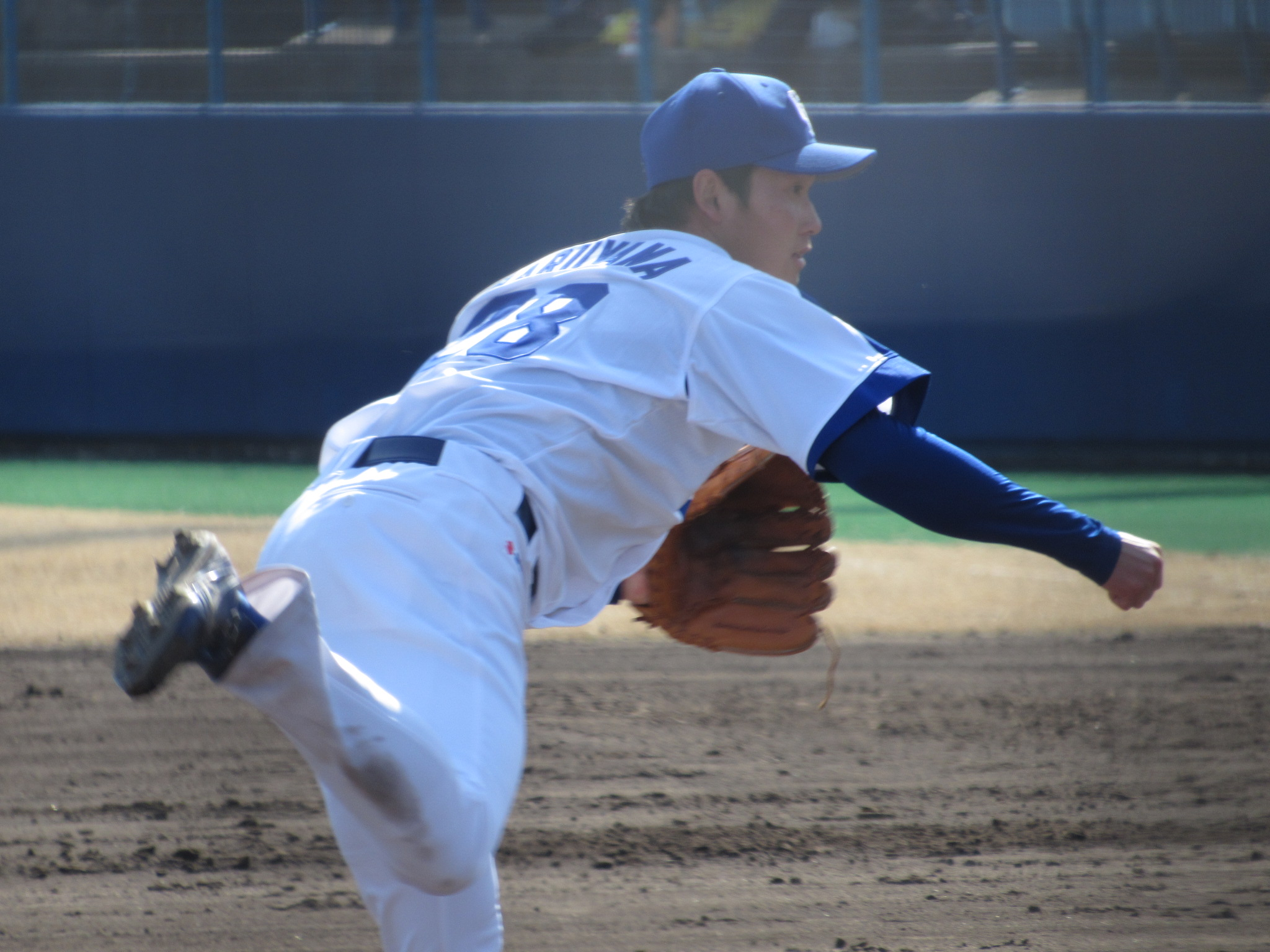
- Pitcher
- Born: February 5, 1995 (age 31); Tokoname, Aichi, Japan
- Bats: Right Throws: Right

NPB debut
- June 14, 2017, for the Chunichi Dragons

NPB statistics (through 2018)
- Win–loss record: 0–0
- Innings pitched: 12
- Earned run average: 8.25
- Strikeouts: 10

Teams
- Chunichi Dragons (2017–2021)

Taisuke Maruyama (丸山泰資, Maruyama Taisuke; born February 5, 1995) is a professional Japanese baseball player. He is currently a free agent having previously played pitcher for the Chunichi Dragons.

On 20 October 2016, Maruyama was selected as the 6th draft pick for the Chunichi Dragons at the 2016 NPB Draft and on 20 November signed a provisional contract with a ¥30,000,000 sign-on bonus and a ¥7,200,000 yearly salary.

After struggling with injury, Maruyama was demoted to a development contract for the 2020 season. After struggling with a hernial disc injury, Ishioka was demoted to a development contract for the 2020 season.
