= Kento Fujishima =

Japanese baseball player (born 1998)

Kento Fujishima 藤嶋 健人
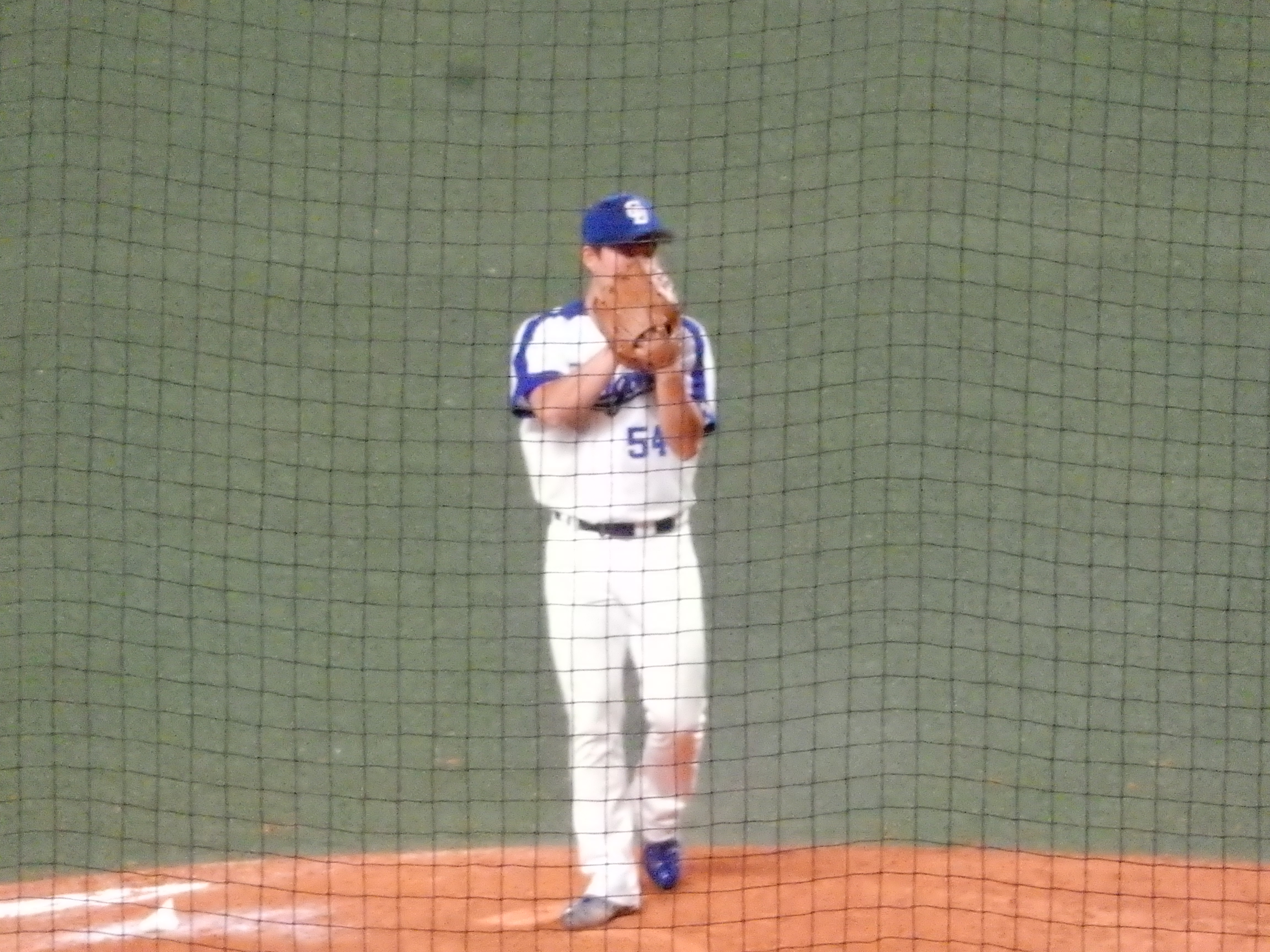

Chunichi Dragons – No. 54
- Pitcher
- Born: May 8, 1998 (age 28); Toyohashi, Aichi, Japan
- Bats: Right Throws: Right

NPB debut
- April 28, 2018, for the Chunichi Dragons

NPB statistics (through July 22, 2026)
- Win–loss record: 14–14
- Earned run average: 2.53
- Strikeouts: 325
- Stats at Baseball Reference

Teams
- Chunichi Dragons (2017–present)

Career highlights and awards
- NPB All-Star (2025)

Kento Fujishima (藤嶋 健人, Fujishima Kento; born May 8, 1998) is a Japanese professional baseball pitcher for the Chunichi Dragons of Nippon Professional Baseball (NPB).

== Career ==
On 20 October 2016, Fujishima was selected as the 5th draft pick for the Chunichi Dragons at the 2016 NPB Draft and on 19 November signed a provisional contract with a ¥30,000,000 sign-on bonus and a ¥5,400,000 yearly salary.

== External ==
- NPB.jp
