= Yuto Furuya =

Japanese baseball player (born 1999)

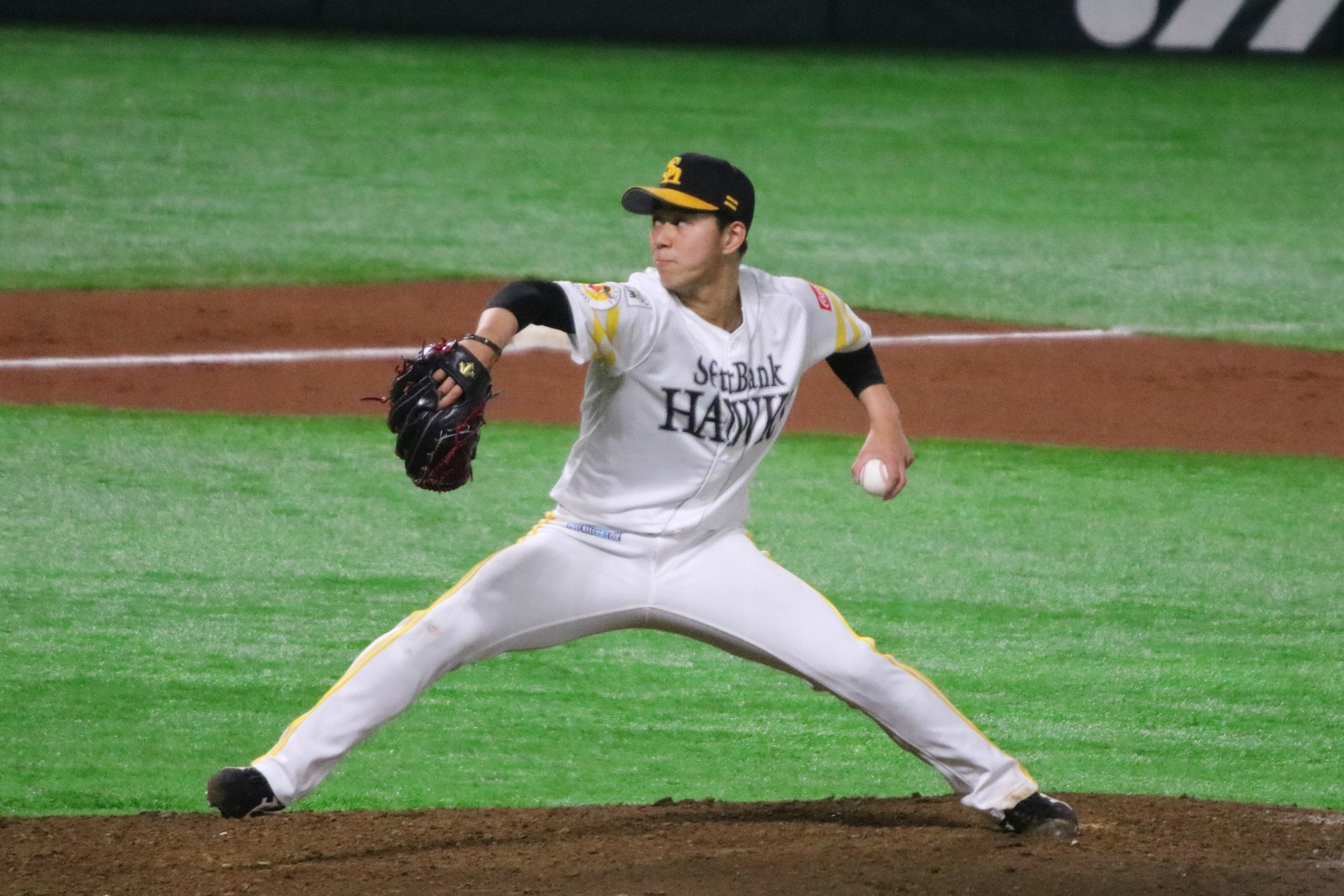
- Furuya with the Fukuoka SoftBank Hawks
- Pitcher
- Born: February 19, 1999 (age 27); Makubetsu, Hokkaido, Japan
- Bats: Left Throws: Left

NPB debut
- July 5, 2020, for the Fukuoka SoftBank Hawks

NPB statistics (through 2021 season)
- Win–loss record: 1-1
- ERA: 2.37
- Holds: 2
- Strikeouts: 22

Teams
- Fukuoka SoftBank Hawks (2017–2021)

Yuto Furuya (古谷 優人, Furuya Yūto; born May 15, 1999 in Makubetsu, Hokkaido) is a Japanese professional baseball Pitcher for the Fukuoka SoftBank Hawks of Nippon Professional Baseball.

== Professional career ==
On October 20, 2016, Furuya was drafted by the Fukuoka SoftBank Hawks in the 2016 Nippon Professional Baseball draft.

In 2017 - 2019 season, Furuya played in the Western League of NPB's minor leagues and played in informal matches against the Shikoku Island League Plus's teams. On May 5, 2019, he recorded the fastest 160 km/h (99.42 mph) fastball in the a left-handed pitcher in the NPB's record in the informal match against the Kagawa Olive Guyners.

On July 5, 2020, Furuya debuted in the Pacific League against the Hokkaido Nippon-Ham Fighters as a relief pitcher. In 2020 season, he pitched 4 games in the Pacific League.
