= Ryuhei Kuki =

Japanese baseball player (born 1998)

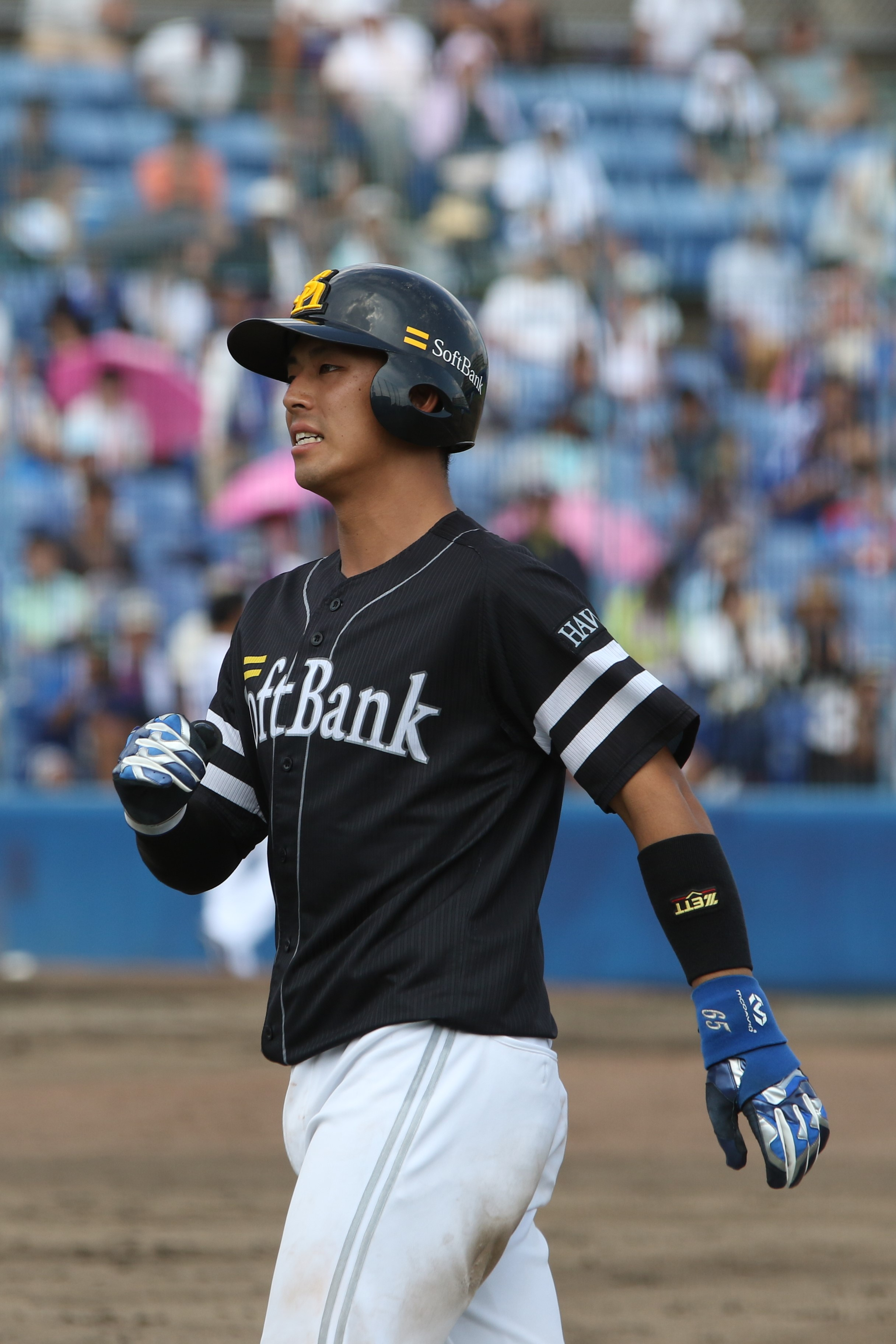
- Kuki with the Fukuoka SoftBank Hawks.

Yokohama DeNA BayStars – No. 95
- Catcher
- Born: September 5, 1998 (age 27); Hirakata, Osaka, Japan
- Bats: Right Throws: Right

NPB debut
- May 26, 2019, for the Fukuoka SoftBank Hawks

NPB statistics (through 2023 season)
- Batting average: .250
- Home runs: 1
- RBI: 2
- Hits: 2
- Stolen base: 0
- Stats at Baseball Reference

Teams
- Fukuoka SoftBank Hawks (2017–2023); Yokohama DeNA BayStars (2024–present)

Career highlights and awards
- 1× Japan Series Champion (2019)
Medals
Men's baseball
Representing Japan
Asian Junior Baseball Championship
Gold medal – first place	2016, Taichung, Taiwan	Team

Ryuhei Kuki (九鬼 隆平, Kuki Ryūhei; born September 5, 1998 in Hirakata, Osaka Prefecture) is a Japanese Professional baseball Catcher for the Yokohama DeNA BayStars of Nippon Professional Baseball.

He previously played for the Fukuoka SoftBank Hawks.

== Early baseball career ==
Kuki participated in the 3rd grade spring 88th Japanese High School Baseball Invitational Tournament and the 3rd grade summer 98th Japanese High School Baseball Championship as a captain, with Fumimaru Taura, who was lower than the first grade, and a battery at the Syugakukan High School. In 2016, Kuki was selected as the Japan national baseball team in the 2016 Asian Junior Baseball Championship. And he contributed to the team's victory as captain, and was honored with an Excellent Defensive Player Award.

== Professional career ==
=== Fukuoka SoftBank Hawks ===
On October 20, 2016, Kuki was drafted by the Fukuoka Softbank Hawks in the 2016 Nippon Professional Baseball draft. During the 2017–2018 season, he played in the Western League of NPB's minor leagues and played in informal matches against Shikoku Island League Plus's teams. On April 3, 2018, he injured his right thumb and operated.

On May 26, 2019, Kuki debuted as a pinch hitter against the Chiba Lotte Marines and recorded a hit by pitch. And he was selected as the Japan Series roster in the 2019 Japan Series. In the match against the Hokkaido Nippon-Ham Fighters on July 5, 2020, Kuki participated as a starter and recorded his first hit in the Pacific League with a home run. However, on September 30, he had surgery on the cervical spine, so he played only five games in the Pacific League for the 2020 season.

In 2021 season, he spent the first half of the season on a rehab assignment, was registered for the first league on June 18, and recorded a hit in a July 7 game against the Chiba Lotte Marines. During the 2022 season, he never had a chance to play in the first league.

In 2023 season, Kuki never had a chance to play in the first league. On October 22, the Hawks announced they would release him.

=== Yokohama DeNA BayStars ===
On December 11, 2023, Kuki signed as a developmental player with the Yokohama DeNA BayStars.

== Ancestry ==
His ancestor is Kuki Yoshitaka, the commander of the Kuki Suigun (Kuki Navy) during the Sengoku period.
