= Takuya Shindoh =

Japanese baseball player (born 1992)

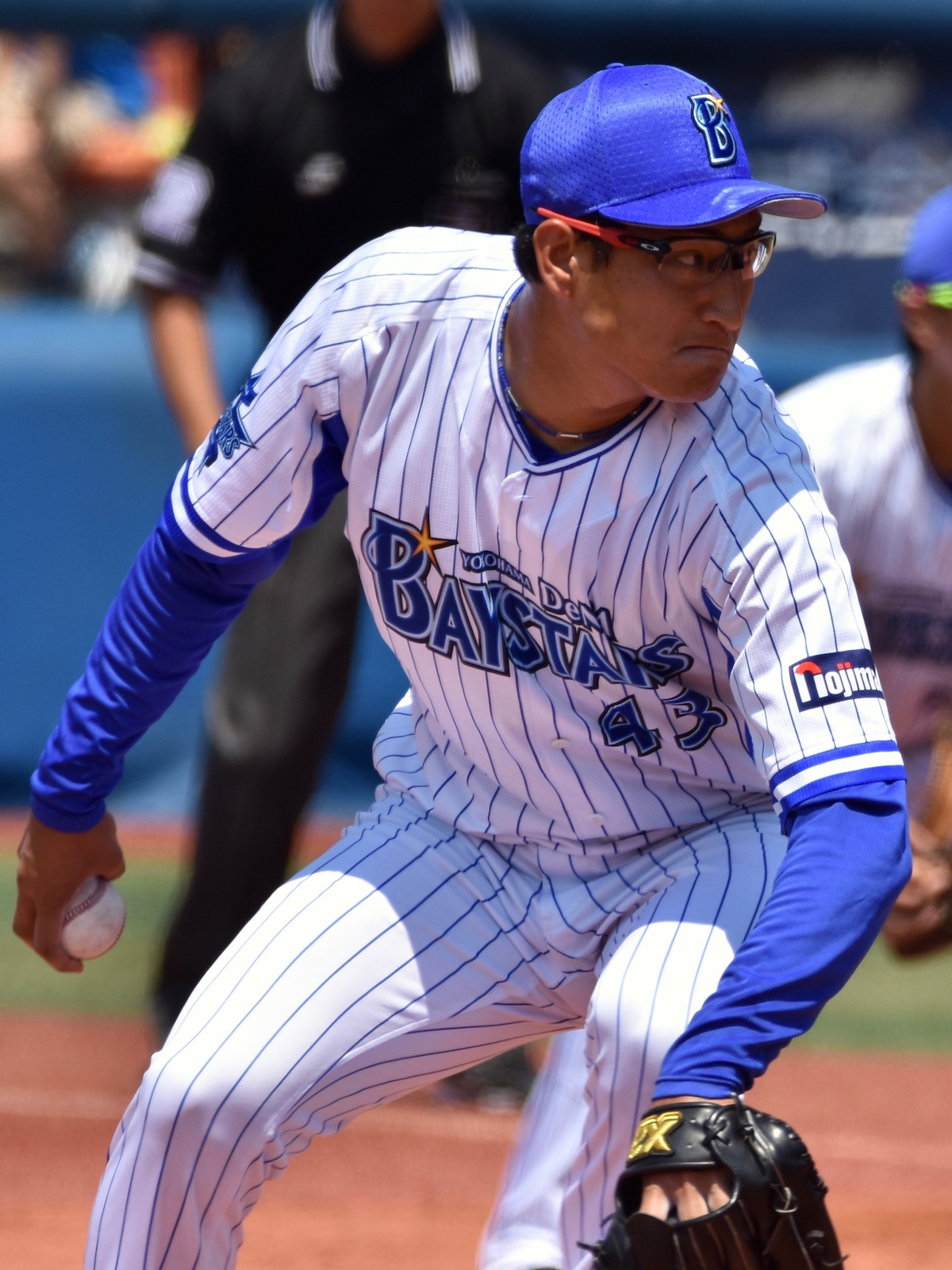
- Shindoh with the Yokohama DeNA BayStars
- Pitcher
- Born: July 16, 1992 (age 33); Daisen, Akita, Japan
- Bats: Right Throws: Right

NPB debut
- March 31, 2017, for the Yokohama DeNA BayStars

NPB statistics (through 2020 season)
- Win–loss record: 0–0
- ERA: 5.60
- Strikeouts: 23

Teams
- Yokohama DeNA BayStars (2017–2021)

Takuya Shindoh (進藤 拓也, Shindoh Takuya; born July 16, 1992 in Daisen, Akita, Japan) is a professional Japanese baseball player. He plays pitcher for the Yokohama DeNA BayStars.
