= Yukikazu Karino =

Japanese baseball player (born 1994)

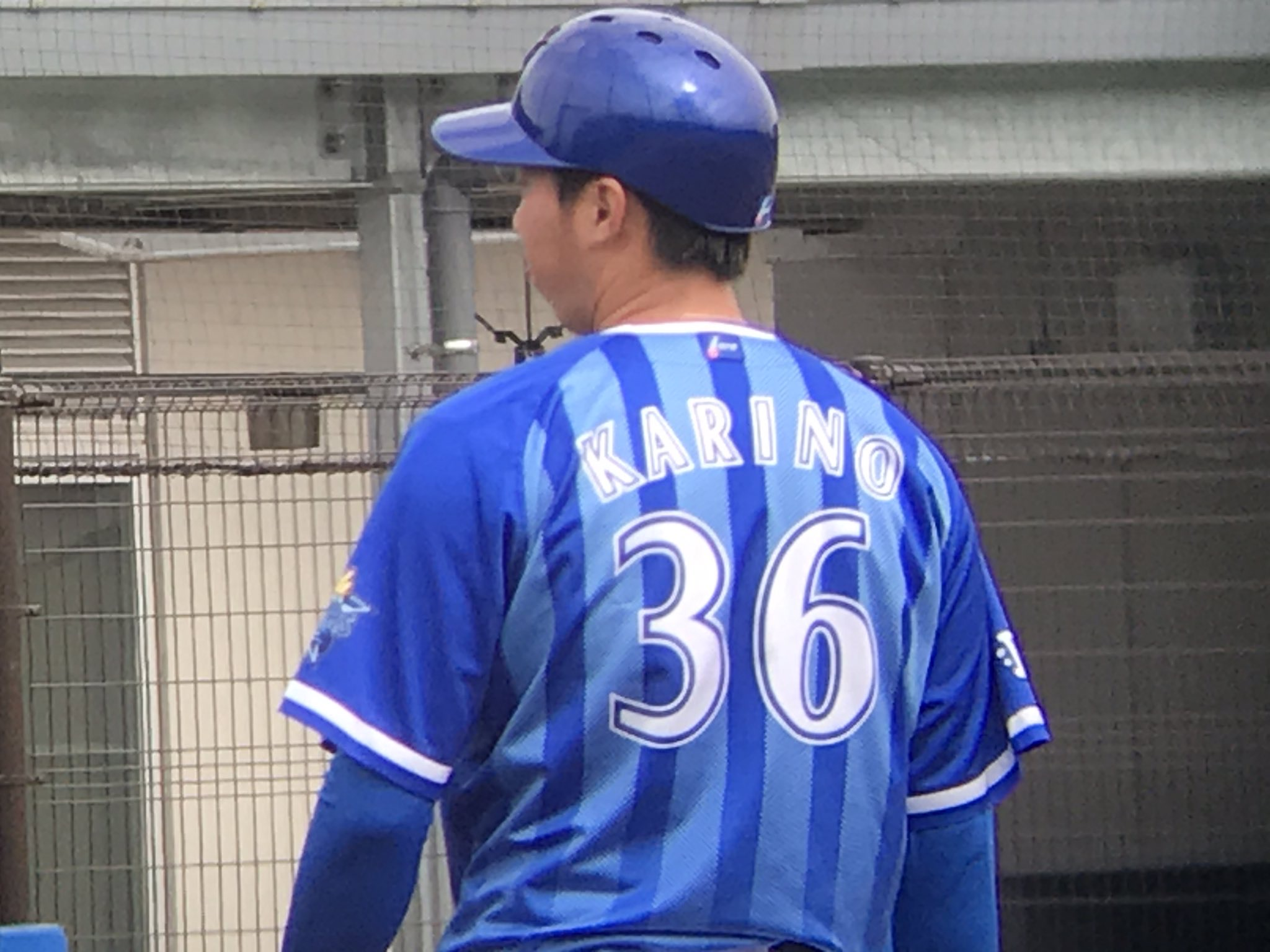
- Infielder
- Born: July 31, 1994 (age 31); Kawagoe, Saitama, Japan
- Bats: Right Throws: Right

Teams
- Yokohama DeNA BayStars (2017–2019)

Yukikazu Karino (狩野 行寿, Karino Yukikazu; born July 31, 1994 in Kawagoe, Saitama, Japan) is a professional Japanese baseball player. He plays infielder for the Yokohama DeNA BayStars.
