= Tomoya Hoshi =

Japanese baseball player (born 1994)

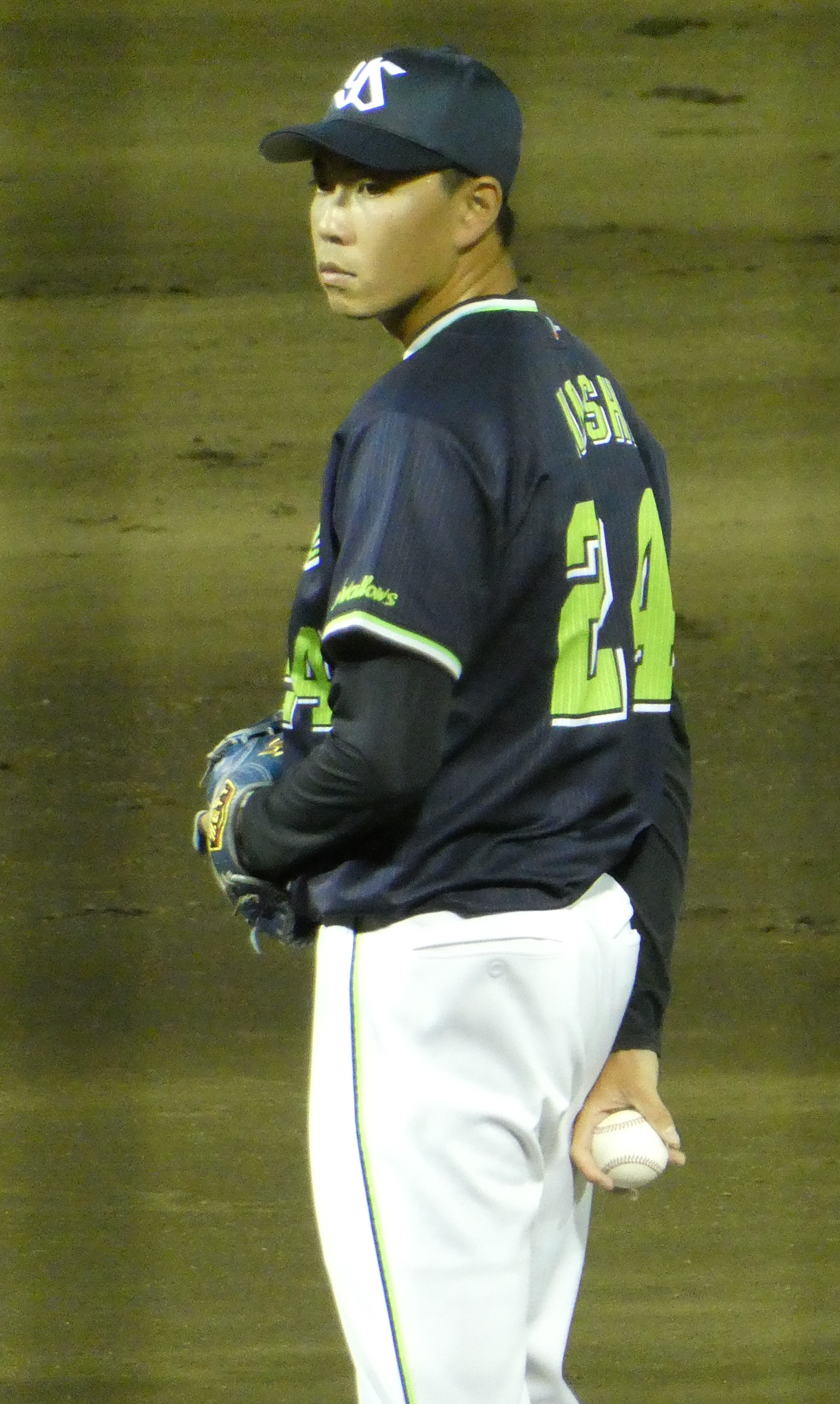
- Hoshi with the Tokyo Yakult Swallows

Tokyo Yakult Swallows – No. 24
- Pitcher
- Born: April 15, 1994 (age 31); Nasu District, Tochigi, Japan
- Bats: Right Throws: Right

debut
- April 1, 2017, for the Tokyo Yakult Swallows

Career statistics (through 2025 season)
- Win–loss record: 11–16
- Earned run average: 4.23
- Strikeouts: 306
- Saves: 19
- Holds: 51
- Stats at Baseball Reference

Teams
- Tokyo Yakult Swallows (2017–present)

Tomoya Hoshi (星 知弥, Hoshi Tomoya; born April 15, 1994 in Nasu District, Tochigi, Japan) is a professional Japanese baseball player. He plays pitcher for the Tokyo Yakult Swallows.
