= Yudai Koga =

Japanese baseball player (born 1998)

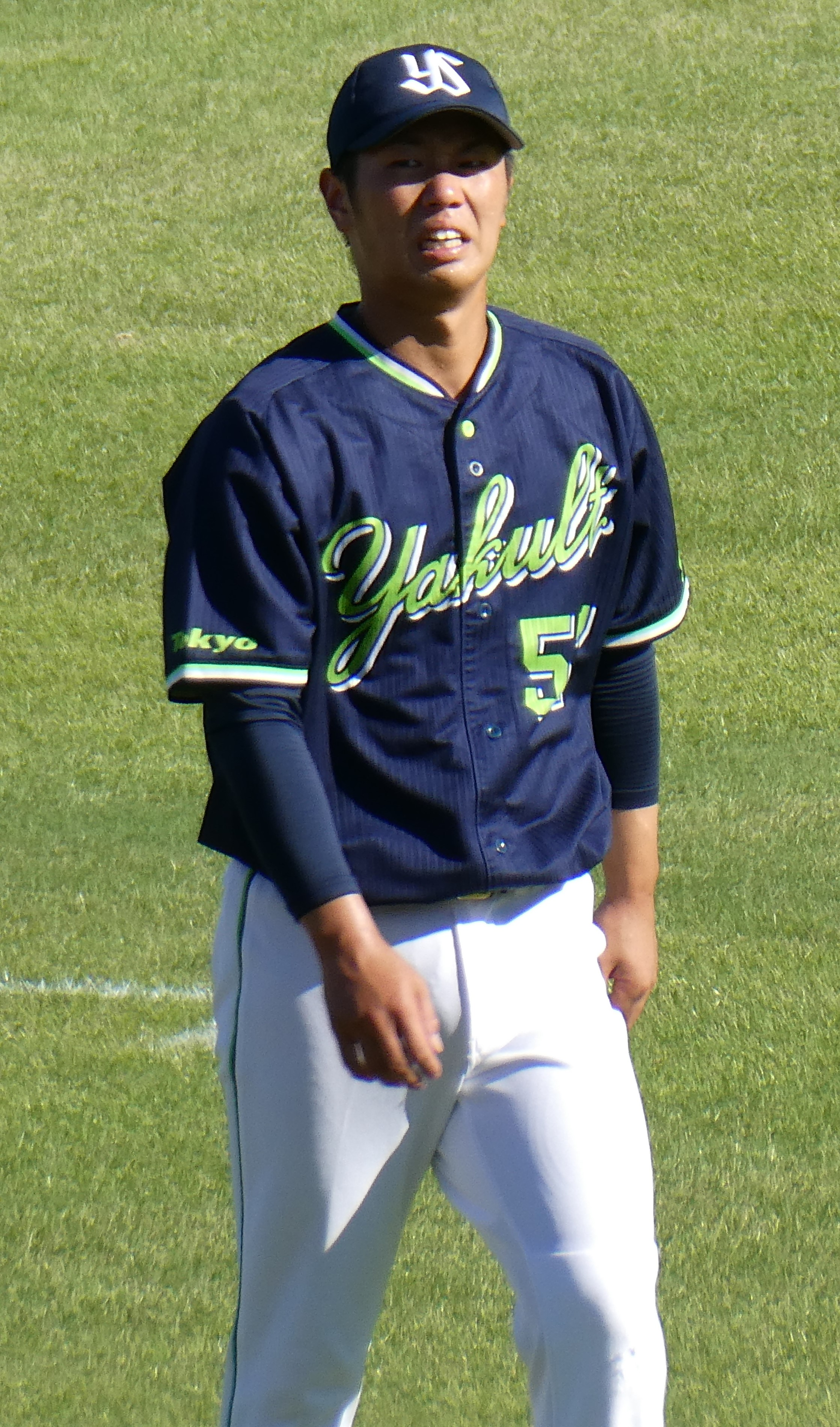
- Koga with the Tokyo Yakult Swallows

Tokyo Yakult Swallows – No. 2
- Catcher
- Born: August 7, 1998 (age 27); Yanagawa, Fukuoka, Japan
- Bats: Right Throws: Right

NPB debut
- May 2, 2018, for the Tokyo Yakult Swallows

Career statistics (through 2024 season)
- Batting average: .200
- Hits: 65
- Home runs: 1
- RBIs: 15
- Stolen bases: 0
- Stats at Baseball Reference

Teams
- Tokyo Yakult Swallows (2017–present)

Yudai Koga (古賀 優大, Koga Yudai; born August 7, 1998 in Yanagawa, Fukuoka, Japan) is a professional Japanese baseball player. He plays catcher for the Tokyo Yakult Swallows.
