= Kento Itohara =

Japanese baseball player (born 1992)

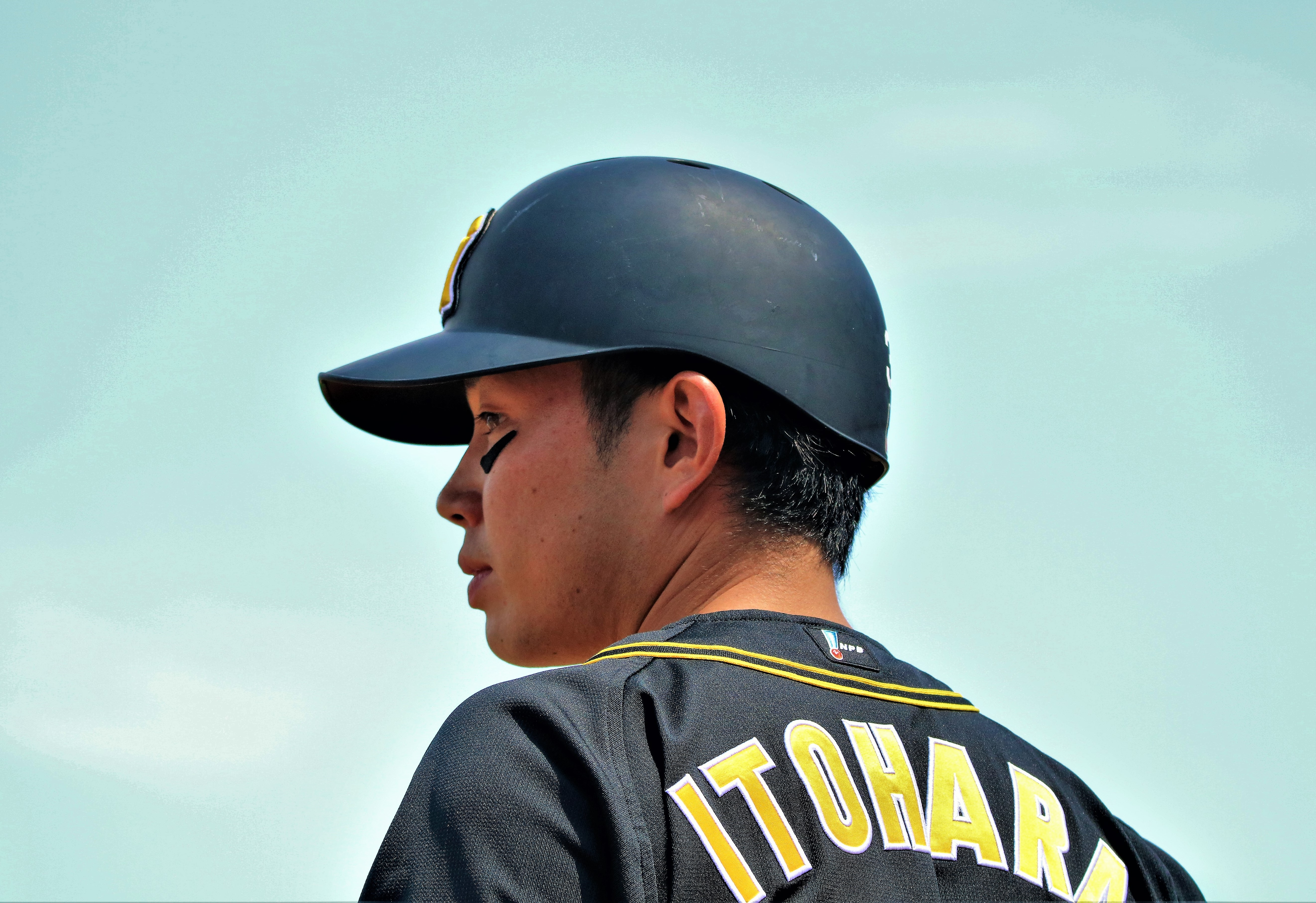

Hanshin Tigers – No. 33
- Infielder
- Born: November 11, 1992 (age 33)
- Bats: Left Throws: Right

NPB debut
- April 1, 2017, for the Hanshin Tigers

NPB statistics (through 2024 season)
- Batting average: .270
- Home runs: 12
- Hits: 666
- RBI: 204
- Stolen bases: 22
- Stats at Baseball Reference

Teams
- Hanshin Tigers (2017–present)

Career highlights and awards
- 1× NPB All-Star (2018)

Kento Itohara (糸原 健斗, Itohara Kento; born November 11, 1992) is a Japanese professional baseball infielder for the Hanshin Tigers in Japan's Nippon Professional Baseball.

== Early baseball career ==
Born and raised in Unnan City, Kento started playing ball in 2nd grade. In his 1st year in Shimane Kaisei High, he recorded hits in 9 consecutive at bats in the Chuugoku regional tournaments. His school made it to the Koshien national tournaments in his 2nd and 3rd year. In their 1st round match against Sendai Ikuei High, despite hitting what would've been a winning 2-base hit in the 9th inning when they were just a point behind, the opposing defense caught Kento's hit and ended the game. He hit a total of 29 home runs in high school.

He entered Meiji University and was a regular starter in the Tokyo Big6 Baseball League. He was awarded Best Nine as a 3rd baseman in his 3rd year. He helped his team finish as runners-up in the Meiji Jingu Baseball Tournament in his 3rd and 4th year. In 71 league games, he recorded a batting average of 0.229, 33 RBIs and 1 home run. He was one year ahead of soon-to-be Hanshin teammates Shun Takayama and Seishirō Sakamoto.

When he went undrafted after graduation, he joined the Industrial Leagues under JX-ENEOS for two years. He debuted with a walk off hit, and finished his first season with .330 BA, and got to participate in the intercity tournaments. While his team didn't make it the following year, he joined Toshiba's team as a loaned player, and still got to play in the tournament, but didn't make it all the way to the championships.

== Hanshin Tigers ==
He was the Tiger' 5th pick at the 2016 NPB Draft. He signed with the Tigers for a contract of 50 million yen, and an annual salary of 8 million. He was given the jersey number 33.

2017

He joined the main roster during spring training, and competed with Hiroki Uemoto for the 2nd base post during the pre-season games. He debuted on as a pinch hitter in the 6th inning during the April 1 game against the Carps in Mazda Stadium. He continued as a shortstop from then on, but Hanshin lost the game 9–8 due to a fielding error he committed in the 10th inning. On the next day, he recorded his 1st hit on his 3rd at-bat from Carp pitcher Ryan Brasier.

He made it to the starting line up as shortstop/7th batter on April 14, and from then on, alternated between being a pinch hitter and starter. His starts gradually increased in May, and on May 19, he became the first rookie in Central League history to reach base in ten consecutive trips to the plate. On July 9, he went 5 for 4 against the Giants, and batted in 3 runs, including his first pro career homerun off Shun Yamaguchi in the 5th inning. His last RBI on that game was a two-base center field hit that won the game in the 9th inning, making it his first career walk-off hit. His hitting streak continued for a couple more games, until he injured his right knee on July 19 when he lost his balance trying to catch a pop fly ball. He was taken off the roster and went into rehab until the season ended. He got a chance to pinch-hit during the post-season play-offs, but Hanshin did not advance into the final round. In 66 games, he finished with a batting average of 0.259, with 24 RBIs including 1 home run. This earned him an 8 million pay raise, bringing his annual salary to 16 million yen.

2018

He competed with Toritani, Hojo and Nishioka for the main shortstop position during spring camp and the pre-season games. He made it to the season opener as a shortstop, but when Yusuke Oyama fell into a slump by the end of April, Itohara took over as third baseman. He also alternated at second base when Uemoto got injured. He continued to bat well, secured the lead-off position by June, and got selected for the mid-season All-Star games. As the team went into a slump further into the season and players got injured one after the other, Itohara remained the only one who performed consistently both at the plate and at the field. Even though he sustained an injury on October 8 when he got hit in the face with his own batted ball, he remained the only player to have appeared in all 143 games. He topped the team with 152 hits, finished with a 0.286 average, and batted in 35 runs including a lone home run. His overall performance more than doubled his paycheck, bringing his annual salary from 16 million to 40 million yen. He also got selected as the team captain for 2019.

2019

This is the 2nd year he appeared in all of the team's 143 games. Despite having fewer plate appearances, a lower batting average and slugging percentage compared to 2018, he batted in 10 more runs this year. His season's highlights include hitting a walk-off hit and the team's only RBI against the Swallows on May 23, and his first season's home run, a 3-run homer that won the game against Hiroshima in July 6. He was once more selected as the team captain for 2020, and received another 20 million raise, bringing his annual paycheck to 60 million yen.

2020

He continued to appear in every game until a wrist injury on July 22 stopped his consecutive games streak at 312. He underwent treatment and rehab afterwards, and resumed play after a few weeks. He finished the pandemic-shortened season with only 63 appearances (out of 120 games), albeit a higher batting average of 0.294. His fewer appearances earned him a 5 million pay cut.

== Playing style ==
Kento is a 175 cm infielder who has experience fielding as 2nd baseman, shortstop and third baseman. His right arm boasts a 110-meter throwing distance, while his 50-meter dash was clocked at 6.1 seconds.
