= Takuya Yasaki =

Japanese baseball player (born 1994)

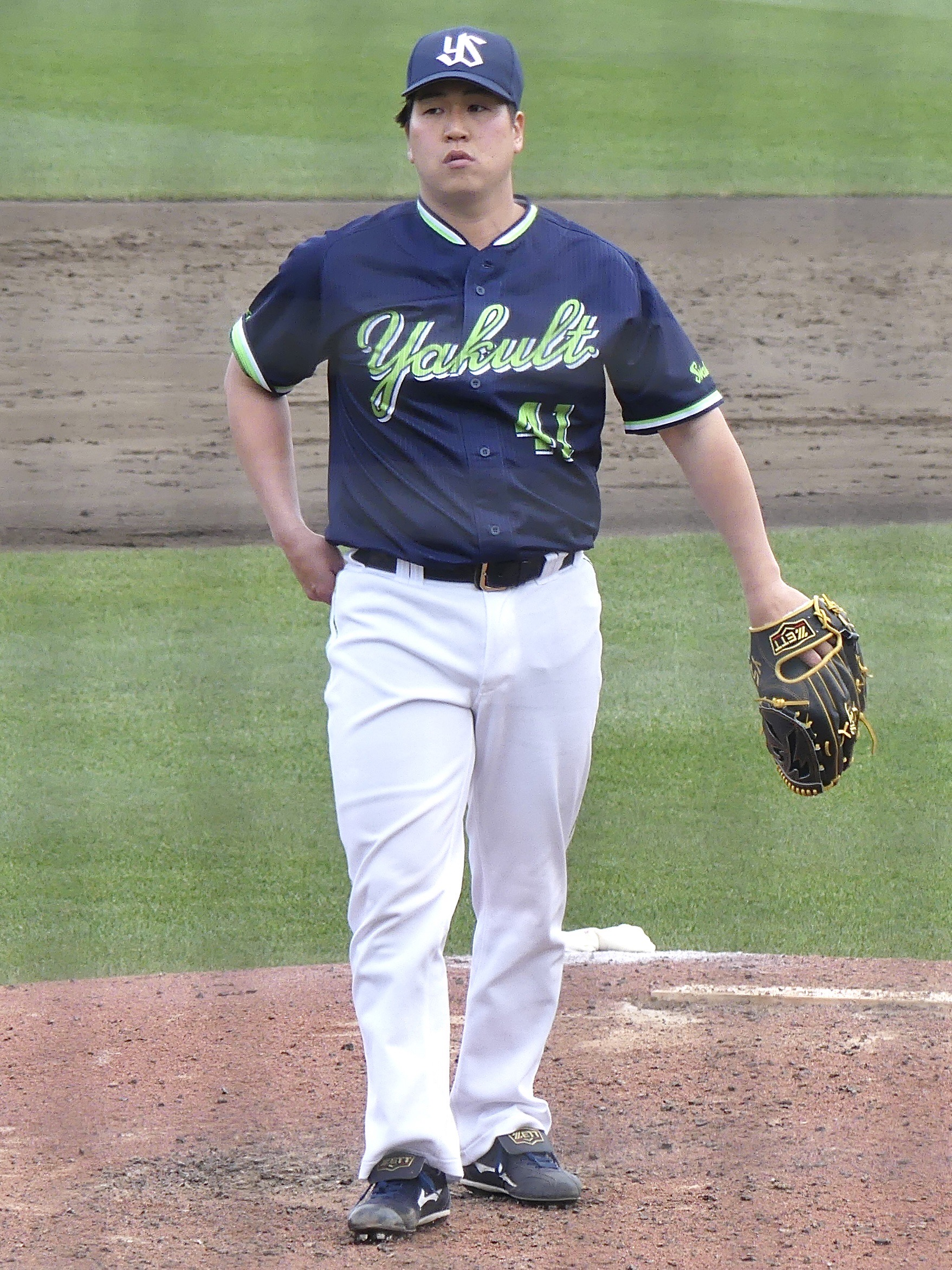

Tokyo Yakult Swallows – No. 41
- Pitcher
- Born: December 31, 1994 (age 31); Nakano, Tokyo, Japan
- Bats: Right Throws: Right

NPB debut
- April 7, 2017, for the Hiroshima Toyo Carp

NPB statistics (through 2025 season)
- Win–loss record: 10-6
- Earned run average: 3.32
- Strikeouts: 195
- Stats at Baseball Reference

Teams
- Hiroshima Toyo Carp (2017–2024); Tokyo Yakult Swallows (2025–present)

Takuya Yasaki (矢崎 拓也, Yasaki Takuya; born December 31, 1994) also known as Takuya Kato (加藤 拓也, Kato Takuya) or Takuya (拓也) is a Japanese professional baseball pitcher for the Tokyo Yakult Swallows of Nippon Professional Baseball (NPB). He has previously played in NPB for the Hiroshima Toyo Carp.
