= Naoki Yoshikawa =

Japanese baseball player (born 1995)

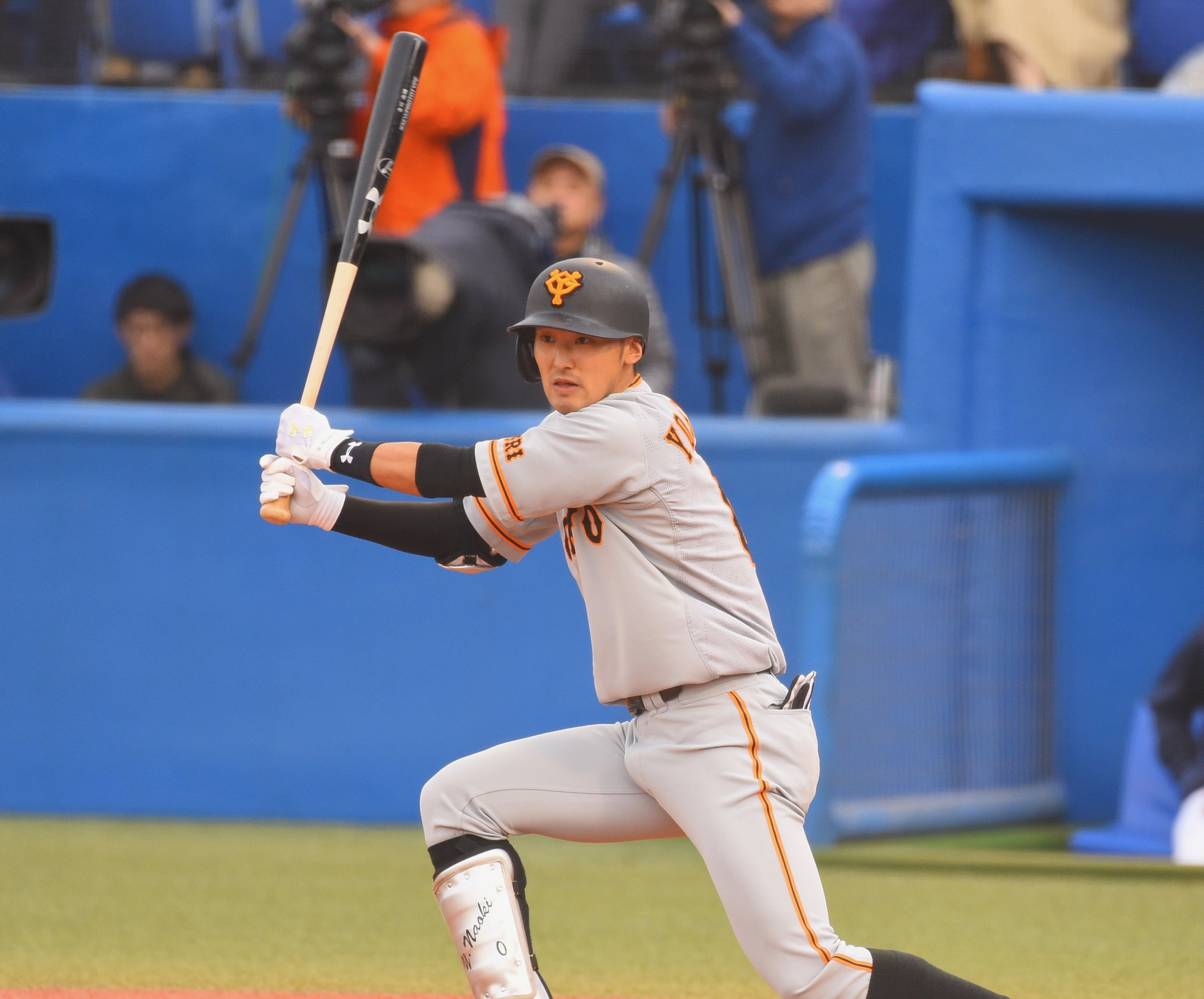
- Yoshikawa with the Yomiuri Giants

Yomiuri Giants – No. 2
- Infielder
- Born: February 8, 1995 (age 31); Hashima, Gifu, Japan
- Bats: Left Throws: Right

NPB debut
- May 14, 2017, for the Yomiuri Giants

NPB statistics (through 2025 season)
- Batting average: .274
- Hits: 798
- Home runs: 39
- Runs batted in: 234
- Stats at Baseball Reference

Teams
- Yomiuri Giants (2017–present)

Career highlights and awards
- NPB All-Star (2025); Central League Best Nine Award (2024); Mitsui Golden Glove Award (2024)
Medals
Men's baseball
Representing Japan
WBSC Premier12
Silver medal – second place	2024	Team

Naoki Yoshikawa (吉川 尚輝, Yoshikawa Naoki; born February 8, 1995) is a Japanese professional baseball second baseman for the Yomiuri Giants of Nippon Professional Baseball (NPB).

== Career ==
On November 16, 2018, Yoshikawa was selected for the Yomiuri Giants roster at the 2018 MLB Japan All-Star Series exhibition game against MLB All-Stars.

On February 27, 2019, he was selected for the first time for the Japan national baseball team at the 2019 exhibition games against Mexico.
