= Tsubasa Sakakibara =

Japanese baseball player (born 1998)

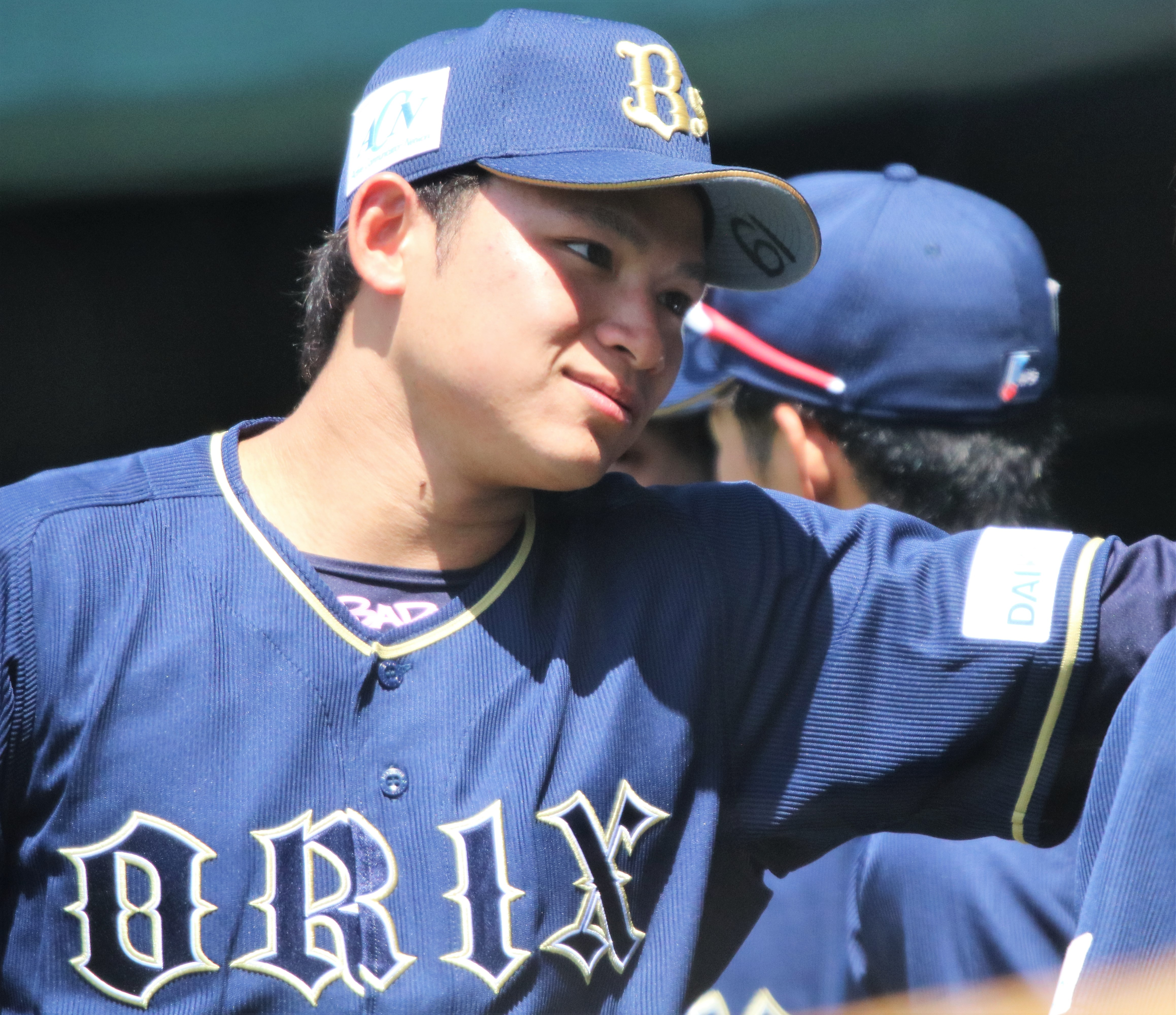
- Pitcher
- Born: August 25, 1998 (age 27); Chōshi, Chiba, Japan
- Batted: Right Threw: Right

NPB debut
- April 1, 2018, for the Orix Buffaloes

Last NPB appearance
- July 2, 2021, for the Orix Buffaloes

NPB statistics
- Win–loss record: 4-8
- Earned Run Average: 3.58
- Strikeouts: 107
- Stats at Baseball Reference

Teams
- Orix Buffaloes (2017-2022)

Tsubasa Sakakibara (榊原 翼, Sakakibara Tsubasa; born August 25, 1998) is a Japanese former professional baseballpitcher. He played in Nippon Professional Baseball (NPB) for the Orix Buffaloes from 2017 to 2022.
