= Hiroki Hasegawa (baseball) =

Japanese baseball player (born 1998)

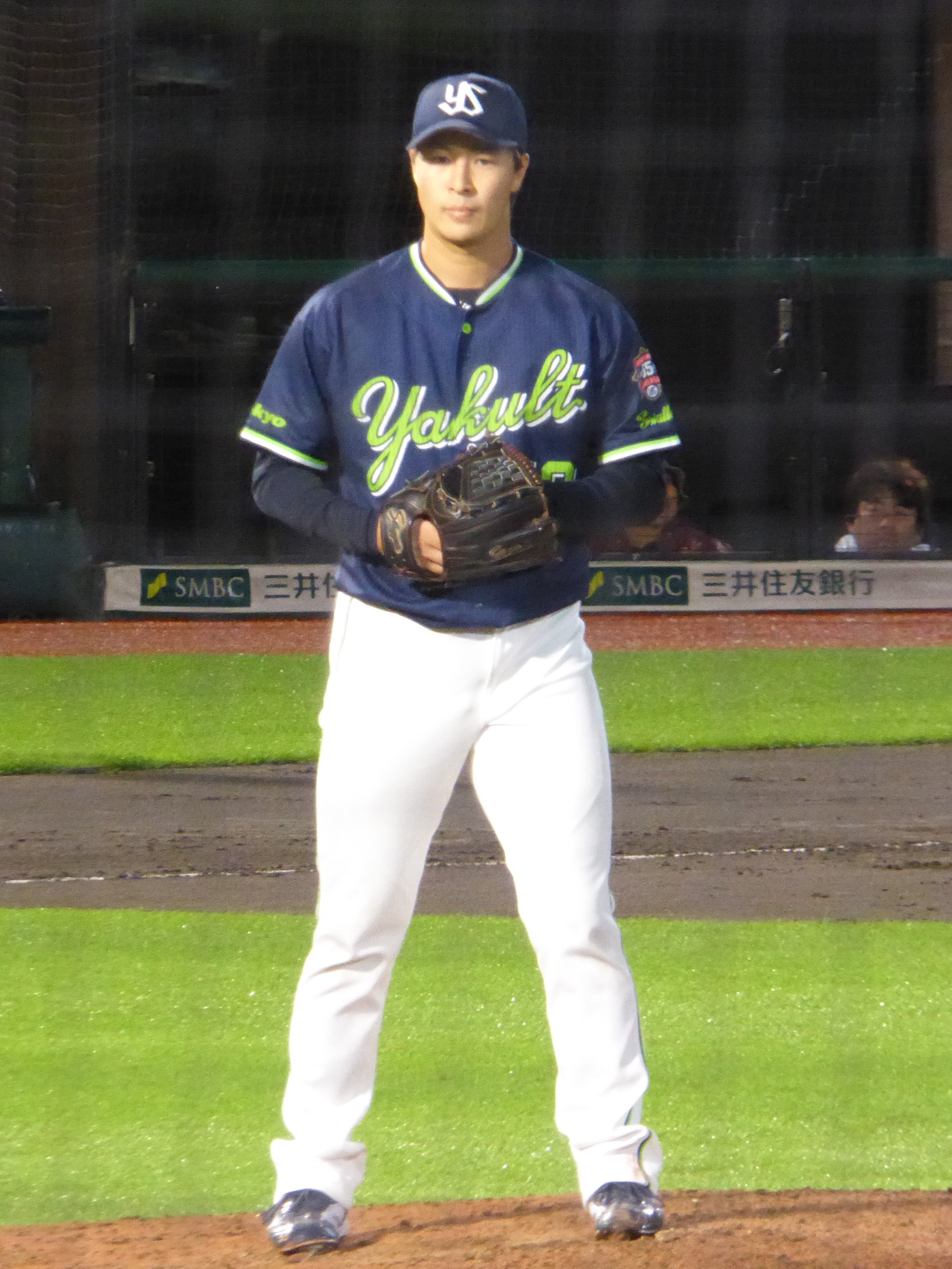

Tokyo Yakult Swallows – No. 53
- Pitcher
- Born: August 23, 1998 (age 27); Kodaira, Tokyo, Japan
- Bats: Left Throws: Left

NPB debut
- June 19, 2020, for the Tokyo Yakult Swallows

Career statistics (through 2024 season)
- Win–loss record: 3-2
- Earned Run Average: 5.94
- Strikeouts: 70
- Saves: 0
- Holds: 9
- Stats at Baseball Reference

Teams
- Fukuoka SoftBank Hawks (2017–2019); Tokyo Yakult Swallows (2020–present)

Hiroki Hasegawa (長谷川 宙輝, Hasegawa Hiroki; born August 23, 1998) is a professional Japanese baseball player. He plays pitcher for the Tokyo Yakult Swallows.
