= Ichirō Tamura =

Japanese baseball player (born 1994)

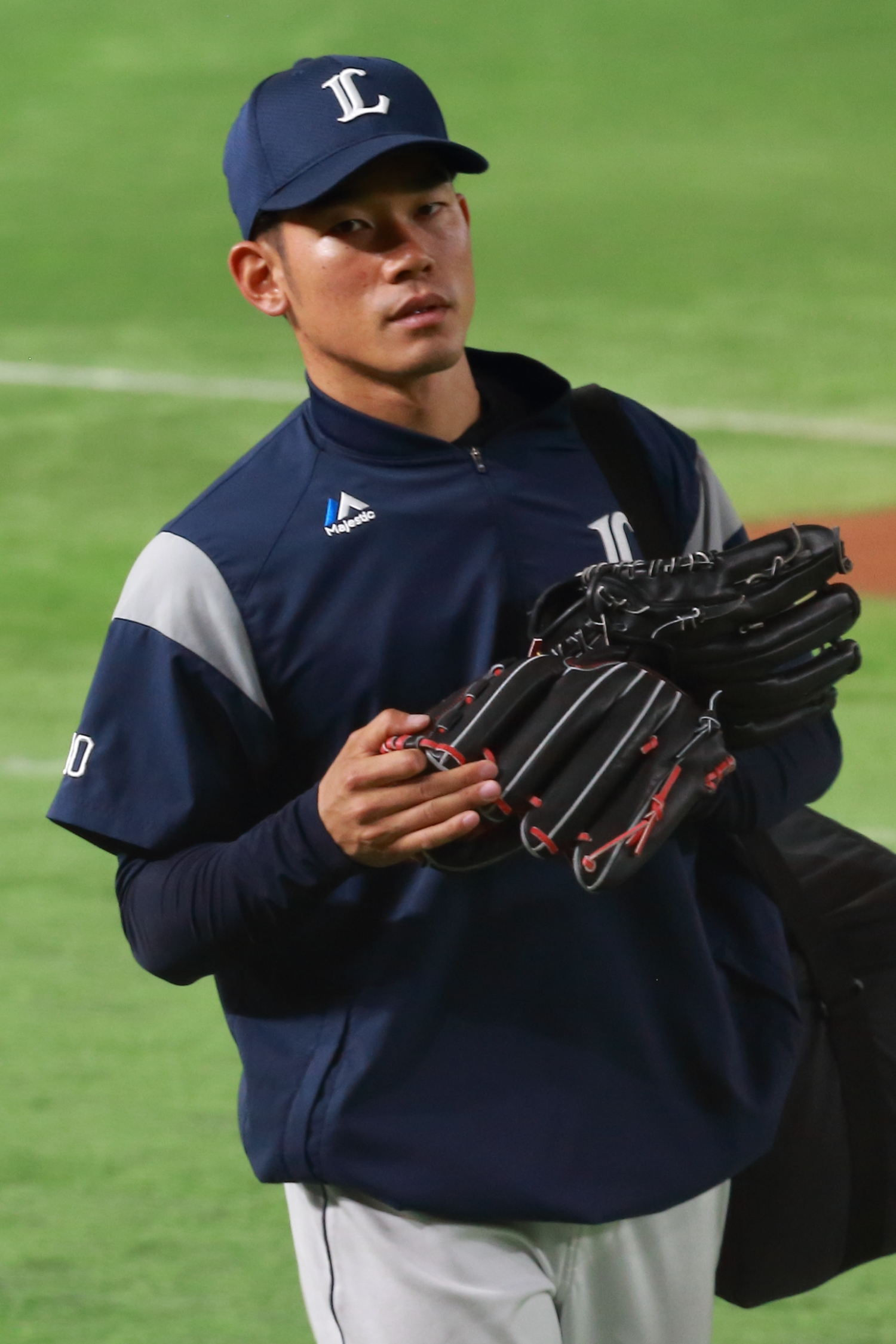
- Tamura with the Saitama Seibu Lions

Free agent
- Pitcher
- Born: September 19, 1994 (age 31); Kobe, Hyōgo, Japan
- Bats: Left Throws: Right

Professional debut
- NPB: May 9, 2017, for the Saitama Seibu Lions
- KBO: March 29, 2026, for the Doosan Bears

NPB statistics (through 2025 season)
- Win–loss record: 4–2
- Earned run average: 3.40
- Strikeouts: 127

KBO statistics (through 2026 season)
- Win–loss record: 1–1
- Earned run average: 7.31
- Strikeouts: 14
- Stats at Baseball Reference

Teams
- Saitama Seibu Lions (2017–2025); Doosan Bears (2026)

Ichirō Tamura (田村 伊知郎, Tamura Ichirō; born September 19, 1994) is a Japanese professional baseball pitcher who is a free agent. He has previously played in Nippon Professional Baseball (NPB) for the Saitama Seibu Lions, and in the KBO League for the Doosan Bears.

== Career ==
=== Saitama Seibu Lions ===
From 2017 to 2025, Tamura played for the Saitama Seibu Lions of Nippon Professional Baseball. In 150 total appearances during that span, Tamura compiled a 4-2 record and 3.40 ERA with 127 strikeouts and two saves across 182 2/3 innings pitched.

=== Doosan Bears ===
On December 4, 2025, Tamura signed a one-year, $200,000 contract with the Doosan Bears of the KBO League. He made 17 appearances for the Bears, logging a 1–1 record and 7.31 ERA with 14 strikeouts over 16 innings of work. Tamura was released by Doosan on May 26, 2026.
