= Chihaya Sasaki =

Japanese baseball player (born 1994)

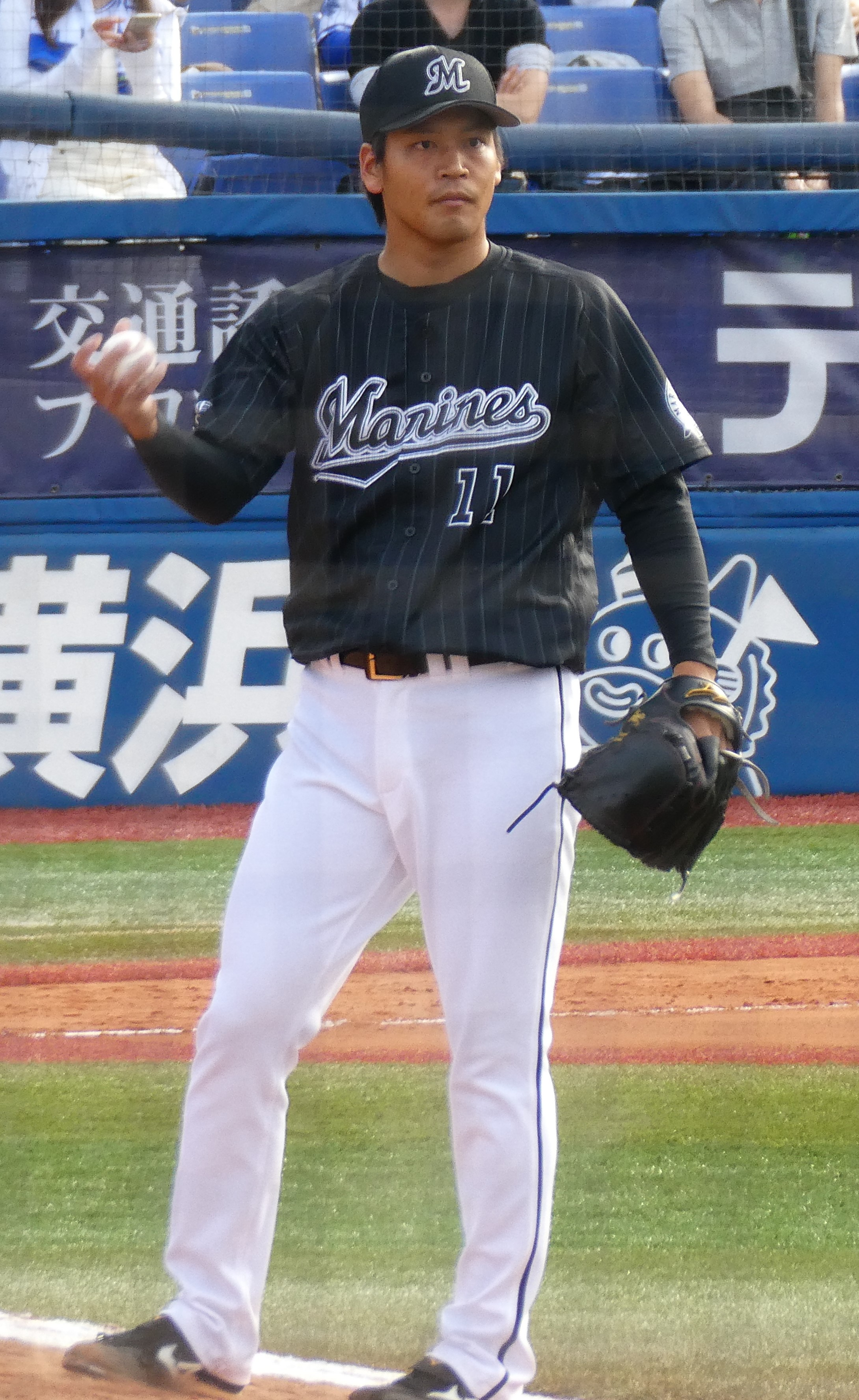

Yokohama DeNA BayStars – No. 41
- Pitcher
- Born: June 8, 1994 (age 32)
- Bats: Right Throws: Right

NPB debut
- April 6, 2017, for the Chiba Lotte Marines

NPB statistics (through 2025 season)
- Win–loss record: 18–14
- ERA: 3.32
- Strikeouts: 179
- Saves: 2
- Holds: 37
- Stats at Baseball Reference

Teams
- Chiba Lotte Marines (2017, 2019–2023); Yokohama DeNA BayStars (2024–present)

Career highlights and awards
- Japan Series champion (2024); NPB All-Star (2021)

Chihaya Sasaki (佐々木 千隼; born June 8, 1994) is a Japanese professional baseball pitcher for the Yokohama DeNA BayStars in Japan's Nippon Professional Baseball.
