= Masaya Kyōyama =

Japanese baseball player (born 1998)

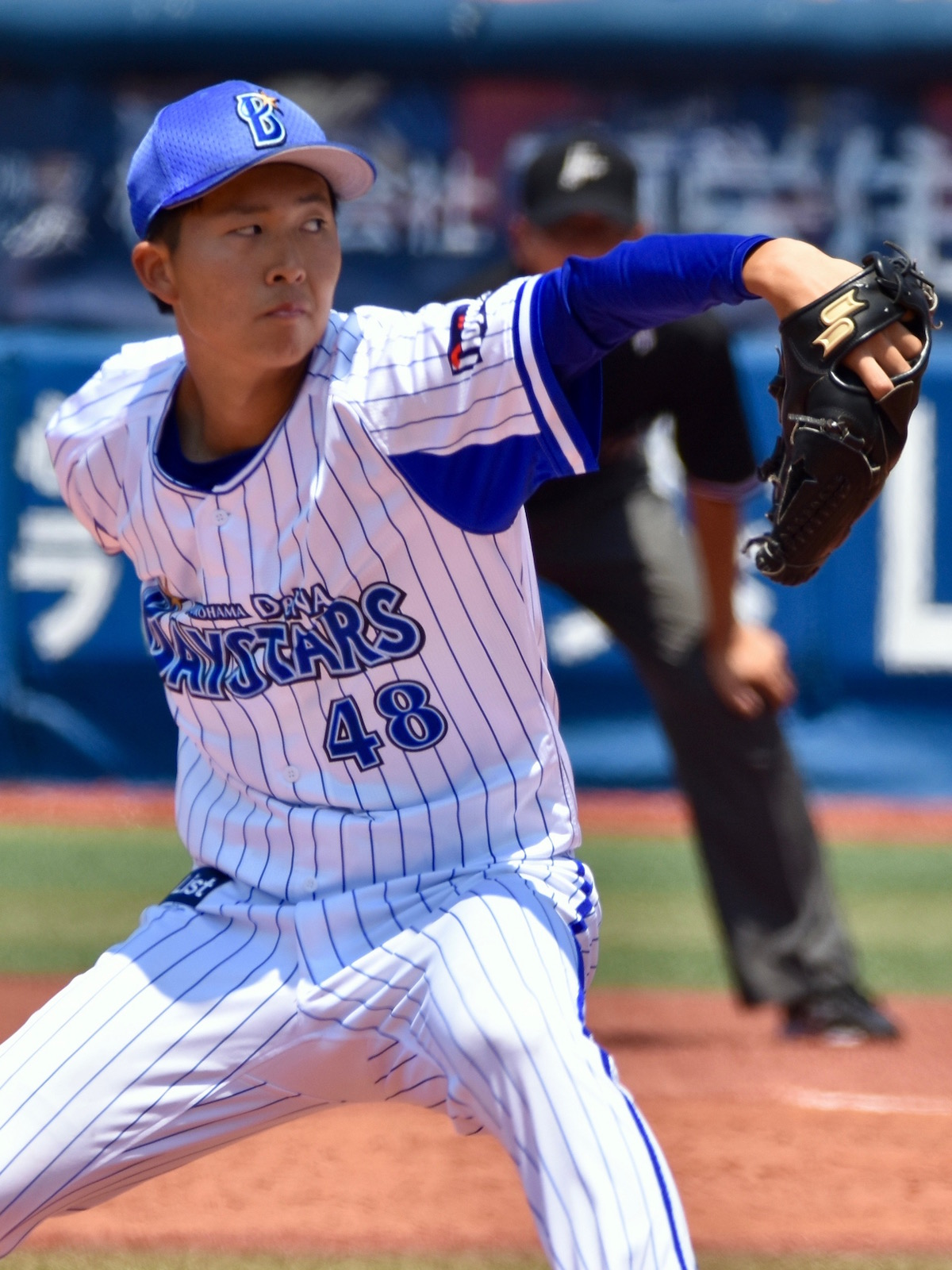
- Kyōyama with the Yokohama DeNA BayStars

Rakuten Monkeys
- Pitcher
- Born: July 4, 1998 (age 28); Ōtsu, Shiga, Japan
- Bats: Right Throws: Right

Professional debut
- NPB: April 1, 2018, for the Yokohama DeNA BayStars
- KBO: March 28, 2026, for the Lotte Giants

NPB statistics (through 2024 season)
- Win–loss record: 14–23
- Earned run average: 4.60
- Strikeouts: 222

KBO statistics (through May 8, 2026)
- Win–loss record: 0–1
- Earned run average: 7.59
- Strikeouts: 13
- Stats at Baseball Reference

Teams
- Yokohama DeNA BayStars (2017–2025); Lotte Giants (2026)

Masaya Kyōyama (京山 将弥, Kyōyama Masaya; born July 4, 1998 in) is a Japanese professional baseball pitcher for the Rakuten Monkeys of the Chinese Professional Baseball League (CPBL). He has previously played in Nippon Professional Baseball (NPB) for the Yokohama DeNA BayStars, and in the KBO League for the Lotte Giants.

== Career ==
=== Yokohama DeNA BayStars ===
From 2017 to 2025, Kyōyama played for the Yokohama DeNA BayStars of Nippon Professional Baseball. In 84 appearances for the BayStars during that span, Kyōyama compiled a 14-23 record and 4.60 ERA with 222 strikeouts across 277 2/3 innings pitched.

=== Lotte Giants ===
On December 12, 2025, Kyōyama signed a one-year, $150,000 contract with the Lotte Giants of the KBO League. He made 10 appearances for the Giants, struggling to an 0–1 record and 7.59 ERA with 13 strikeouts across 10 2/3 innings pitched. Kyōyama was released by Lotte on June 18, 2026, following the signing of Shōta Iimura.

=== Rakuten Monkeys ===
On August 4, 2026, Kyōyama signed a developmental contract with the Rakuten Monkeys of the Chinese Professional Baseball League.
