= Shohei Suzuki (baseball) =

Japanese baseball player

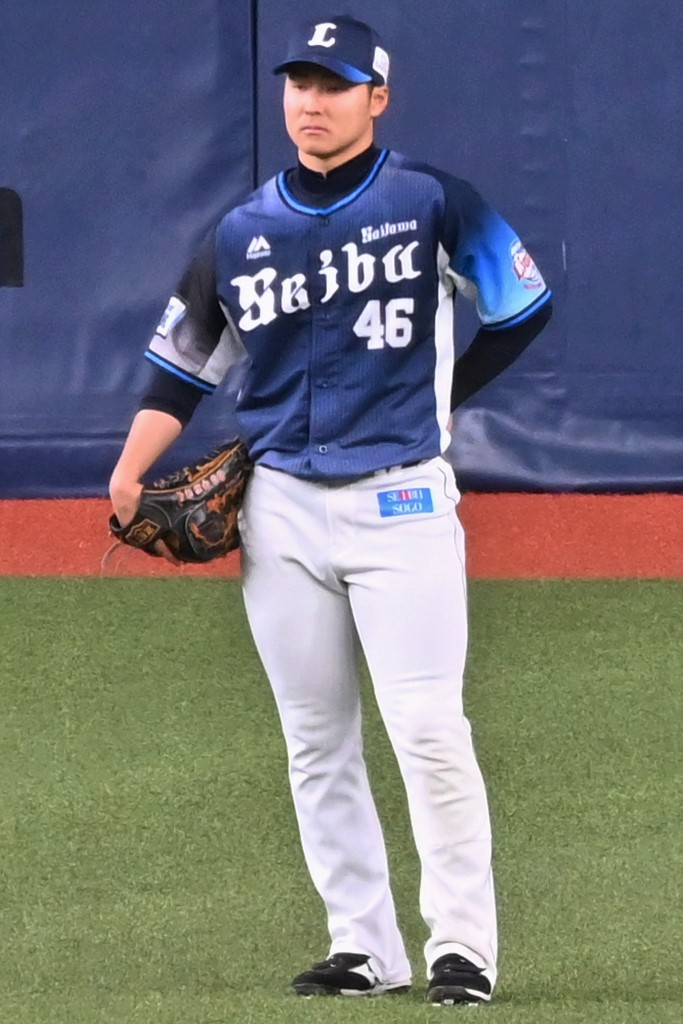

Saitama Seibu Lions – No. 46
- Outfielder
- Born: May 20, 1998 (age 27); Fuji, Shizuoka, Japan
- Bats: Left Throws: Left

NPB debut
- April 3, 2019, for the Saitama Seibu Lions

Career statistics (through April 5, 2022)
- Batting average: .203
- Home runs: 2
- RBIs: 14
- Stats at Baseball Reference

Teams
- Saitama Seibu Lions (2019-present)

Shohei Suzuki (鈴木 将平, Suzuki Shohei; born May 20, 1998 in Fuji, Shizuoka, Japan) is a professional Japanese baseball player. He is an outfielder for the Saitama Seibu Lions of Nippon Professional Baseball (NPB).
