= Hikaru Nakao =

Japanese baseball player

- Pitcher
- Born: September 14, 1994 (age 31); Nagoya, Aichi, Japan
- Bats: Left Throws: Left

debut
- June 8, 2017, for the Tokyo Yakult Swallows

NPB statistics (through 2020 season)
- Win–loss record: 7–5
- ERA: 4.89
- Strikeouts: 84
- Saves: 0
- Holds: 12
- Stats at Baseball Reference

Teams
- Tokyo Yakult Swallows (2017–2021)

Hikaru Nakao (中尾 輝, Nakao Hikaru; born September 14, 1994) is a professional Japanese baseball player. He plays pitcher for the Tokyo Yakult Swallows.
