= Naruki Terashima =

Japanese baseball player

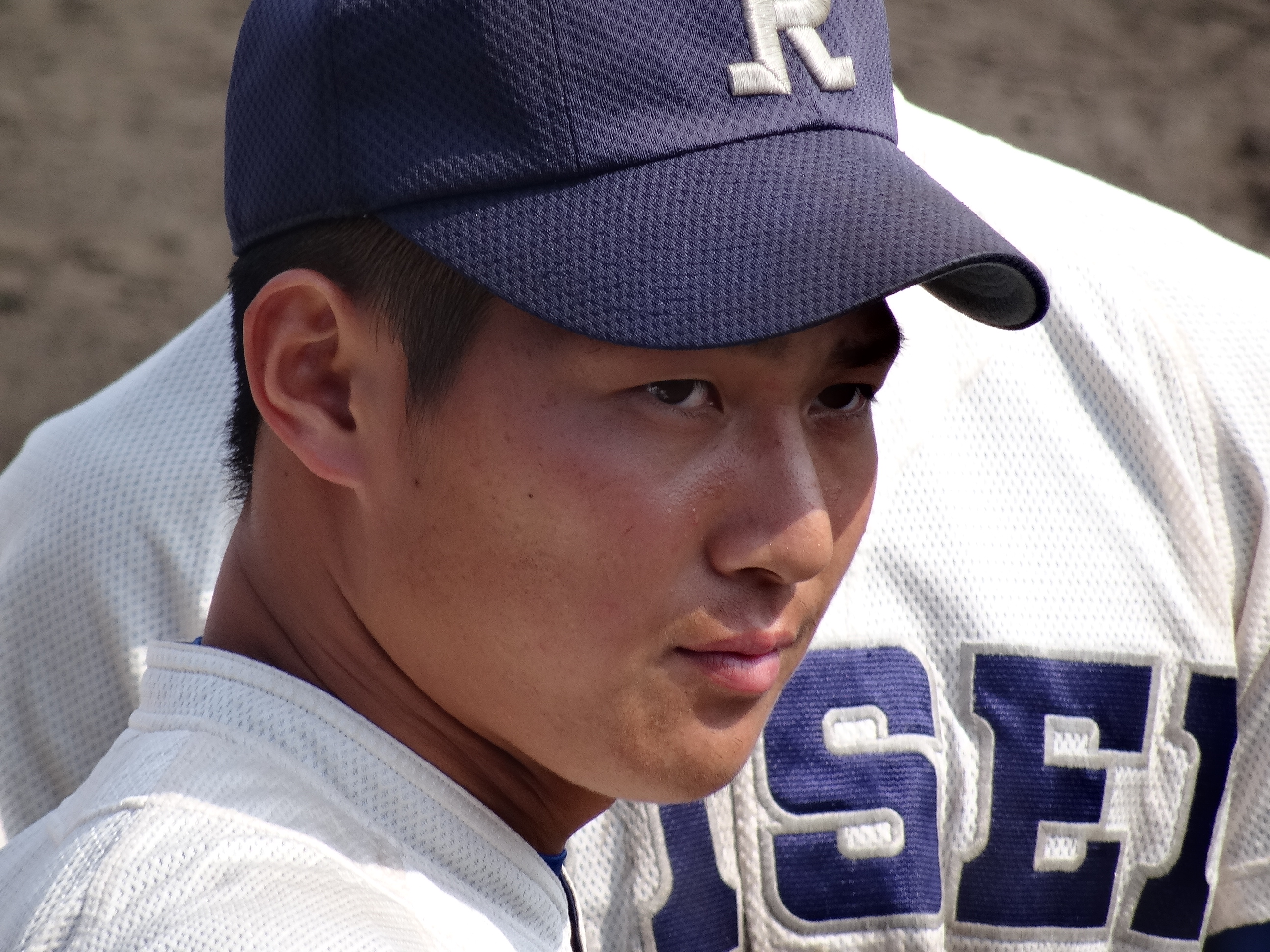
- Pitcher
- Born: July 30, 1998 (age 27); Ibaraki, Osaka, Japan
- Batted: Left Threw: Left

debut
- September 30, 2017, for the Tokyo Yakult Swallows

Last appearance
- March 27, 2021, for the Tokyo Yakult Swallows

NPB statistics (through 2021 season)
- Win–loss: 1-1
- ERA: 4.37
- Strikeouts: 32
- Stats at Baseball Reference

Teams
- Tokyo Yakult Swallows (2017–2022)

Naruki Terashima (寺島 成輝, Terashima Naruki; born July 30, 1998 in Ibaraki, Osaka, Japan) is a professional Japanese baseball player. He plays pitcher for the Tokyo Yakult Swallows.
