= Yūya Onaka =

Japanese baseball player

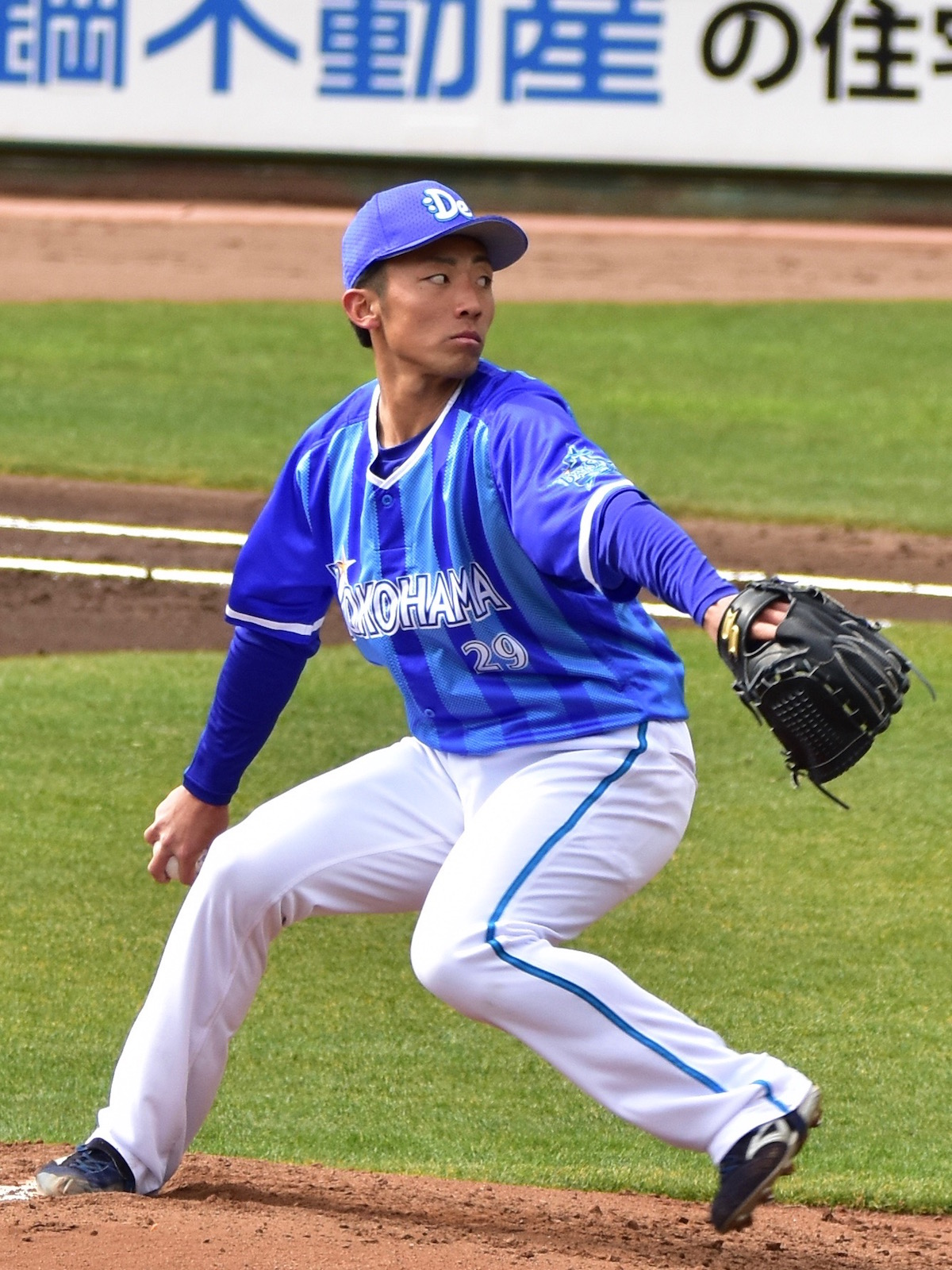
- Onaka with the Yokohama DeNA BayStars

Tokyo Yakult Swallows – No. 52
- Pitcher
- Born: January 31, 1995 (age 31); Kitakyushu, Fukuoka, Japan
- Bats: Left Throws: Right

NPB debut
- May 9, 2017, for the Yokohama DeNA BayStars

Career statistics (through 2020 season)
- Win–loss record: 1–2
- Earned run average: 5.71
- Strikeouts: 39
- Stats at Baseball Reference

Teams
- Yokohama DeNA BayStars (2017); Hanshin Tigers (2018–2022); Tokyo Yakult Swallows (2023–present)

Yūya Onaka (尾仲 祐哉, Onaka Yūya; born January 31, 1995 in Kitakyushu, Fukuoka, Japan) is a professional Japanese baseballpitcher for the Tokyo Yakult Swallows of Nippon Professional Baseball (NPB). He has previously played in NPB for the Yokohama DeNA BayStars and Hanshin Tigers.
