= Hayato Horioka =

Japanese baseball player (born 1998)

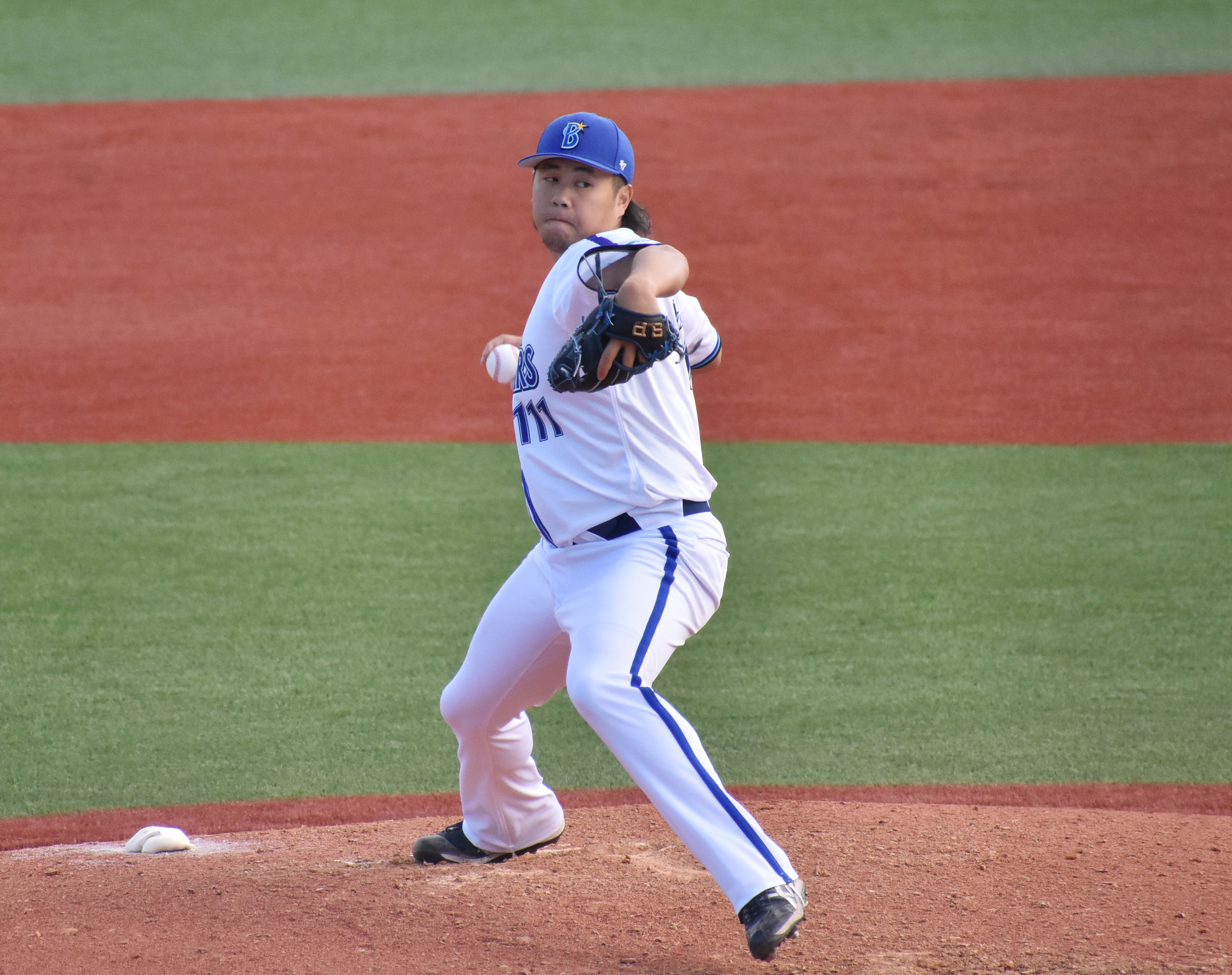
- Horioka with the Yokohama DeNA BayStars in 2024

Yokohama DeNA BayStars – No. 92
- Pitcher
- Born: September 11, 1998 (age 27); Hadano, Kanagawa, Japan
- Bats: Right Throws: Right

NPB debut
- August 1, 2019, for the Yomiuri Giants

Career statistics (through 2024 season)
- Win–loss record: 0–0
- Earned run average: 6.49
- Strikeouts: 23
- Stats at Baseball Reference

Teams
- Yomiuri Giants (2017–2023); Yokohama DeNA BayStars (2024–present)

Career highlights and awards
- Japan Series champion (2024)

Hayato Horioka (堀岡 隼人, Horioka Hayato; born October 10, 1998) is a professional Japanese baseball pitcher for the Yokohama DeNA BayStars of Nippon Professional Baseball (NPB). He has previously played in NPB for the Yomiuri Giants.
