= 2021 Yokohama DeNA BayStars season =

Nippon Professional Baseball season

2021 Yokohama DeNA BayStars
- League: Central League
- Ballpark: Yokohama Stadium
- Record: 54-73-16 (.425)
- League place: 6th
- Parent company: DeNA Co., Ltd.
- Manager: Daisuke Miura

The 2021 Yokohama DeNA BayStars season was the 71st season of the franchise in Nippon Professional Baseball, their 43rd season in Yokohama, and in Yokohama Stadium, and their 10th season under DeNA. This was also the first season under manager and former player Daisuke Miura, who replaced 5 year manager Alex Ramirez.

== Regular season ==
The BayStars finished dead last in Central League, with a 54-73-16 record, with a .425 winning percentage, 20 and a half games back of the Swallows. They had a bit of an abysmal start in April, because they could not get their foreign talent, but when they got them back on their roster and late into the season, Yokohama showed how dominant their offense was.

=== 2021 Central League Standings ===
Pos	Team	G	W	L	T	Pct.	GB	Home	Road
1	Tokyo Yakult Swallows	143	73	52	18	.584	—	36–29–7	37–23–11
2	Hanshin Tigers	143	77	56	10	.579	1	36–31–4	41–25–6
3	Yomiuri Giants	143	61	62	20	.496	11½	32–30–10	29–32–10
4	Hiroshima Toyo Carp	143	63	68	12	.481	14	30–34–8	33–34–4
5	Chunichi Dragons	143	55	71	17	.437	19	33–27–11	22–44–6
6	Yokohama DeNA BayStars	143	54	73	16	.425	20½	27–37–7	27–36–9

== Roster ==
Yokohama DeNA BayStars roster
First team		Second team
Pitchers: 11 Katsuki Azuma; 13 Hiromu Ise; 19 Yasuaki Yamasaki; 20 Yuya Sakamoto; 30 Kentaro Shinogi; 36 Shuto Ogata; 39 Naoki Wakamatsu; 49 José Ruiz; 54 Yutaro Ishida; 59 Kentarō Taira; 62 Sean Reynolds; 64 Koh Nakagawa; 65 Daita Miyagi; 68 Masaki Iwata; 92 Hayato Horioka; Catchers: 5 Shion Matsuo; 10 Yasutaka Tobashira; 60 Takeru Furuichi	Infielders: 9 Yōta Kyōda; 25 Yoshi Tsutsugo; 26 Masaki Mimori; 31 Tatsuhiro Shibata; 40 Tomoya Inoue; 44 Taiki Ishikami; 51 Toshiro Miyazaki; Outfielders: 4 Ryuki Watarai; 7 Keita Sano; 8 Kazuki Kamizato; 28 Atsushi Katsumata; 61 Tatsuo Ebina; 99 Cooper Hummel; Manager: 81 Ryoji Aikawa; Coaches: 72 Kenjiro Tsuruoka (Offense chief); 80 Ryoji Aikawa (Defense chief / Battery); 79 Shinji Ohara (Pitching chief); 90 Iwao Ohmura (Hitting); 97 Hiroyasu Tanaka (Infield / Baserunning); 74 Yusuke Kawada (Outfield / Baserunning); 73 Kazuya Fujita (Development Coordinator / Hitting); 94 Yota Kosugi (Pitching); 71 Ken Katoh (Battery)	Pitchers: 0 Jon Duplantier; 12 Yu Takeda; 14 Kenta Ishida; 15 Shunya Shimada; 16 Shinichi Ohnuki; 18 Kenta Kozono; 22 Taisei Irie; 24 Teruki Yoshino; 27 Shintaro Fujinami; 33 Riku Takeda; 35 Tatsuya Hashimoto; 38 Ryoto Matsumoto; 41 Chihaya Sasaki; 42 Austin Cox; 43 Osuke Fukazawa; 45 Kohei Morihara; 46 Kasuga Sakaguchi; 47 Hiromi Katayama; 53 Hayate Nakagawa; 93 Haruto Shoji; 98 Hansel Marcelino; Catchers: 32 Kyosuke Mashiko; 57 Junpei Azuma; 95 Ryuhei Kuki	Infielders: 00 Takuma Hayashi; 2 Shugo Maki; 3 Koichiro Oda; 6 Keito Mori; 34 Asahi Miyashita; 37 Hibiki Katoh; 48 Shuto Naruse; 56 Manato Tanai; Outfielders: 55 Kento Inoue; 58 Kōki Kajiwara; 63 Taiki Sekine; 67 Shōnosuke Hama; Manager: 75 Shuichi Murata; Coaches: 70 Toshiya Tsuji (Hitting); 87 Shigeru Kaga (Pitching assistant); 88 Yusaku Iriki (Pitching chief); 85 Shigeo Yanagida (Infield / Baserunning); 78 Tatsuya Shindo (Infield / Baserunning); 77 Takanori Suzuki (Development Coordinator / Hitting); 86 Yoshiki Yagi (Pitching); 84 Yoshinori Ueda (Outfield / Baserunning) (Hitting); 89 Daisuke Nakai (Outfield / Baserunning) (Offense chief); (Patrol): 82 Takashi Manei (Training Coordinator / Fielding); 79 Shinji Ohara {(Patrol / Hitting); 76 Tomio Tashiro (Hitting)
Development Players
052 Masumi Hamachi (P); 102 Manato Shimizu (P); 103 Kōki Kanabuchi (P); 106 Aki Watanabe (P); 115 Kosuke Baba (P); 125 Soh Ogasawara (IF); 127 Ryota Joko (C); 129 Kenji Nishimaki (IF); 130 Taiga Kondoh (C); 131 Uta Shimizu (IF); 136 Ryudai Morishita (P); 140 Ryunosuke Matsumoto (P); 155 Daiki Kobari (OF); 193 Ikumi Takamizawa (IF)
Updated June 3, 2026		→ All NPB rosters
