= Yanagida =

Yanagida (Japanese: 柳田) is a Japanese surname. Notable people with the surname include:

- Hideaki Yanagida (柳田 英明; born 1947), Japanese wrestler and Olympic champion in freestyle wrestling
- Mai Yanagida (柳田 舞; born 1992), Japanese international cricketer
- Masahiro Yanagida (柳田 将洋; born 1992), Japanese volleyball player
- Masaru Yanagida (柳田 勝; born 1969), Japanese sport shooter
- Masataka Yanagida (柳田 真孝; born 1979), Japanese racing driver
- Minoru Yanagida (柳田 稔; born 1954), Japanese politician of the Democratic Party of Japan
- Mitsuhiro Yanagida (柳田 充弘; born 1941), Japanese molecular biologist
- Nobuaki Yanagida (柳田 伸明; born 1970), Japanese footballer and manager
- Shigeo Yanagida (柳田 殖生; born 1982), Japanese baseball player
- Toshio Yanagida (柳田 敏雄; born 1946), Japanese biophysicist
- Toshio Yanagida (baseball) (柳田 利夫; born 1936), Japanese baseball player
- Tsutomu Yanagida (柳田 勉; born 1949), Japanese particle physicist

== Fictional characters ==
- Ceras Yanagida Lilienfeld of Love Live! Hasunosora Girls' High School Idol Club

== See also ==
- Yanagida, Ishikawa, village located in Fugeshi District, Ishikawa, Japan
- 73782 Yanagida (1994 TD15), a main-belt asteroid discovered in 1994
- Yanagita, a Japanese surname
