= Yanagita =

Yanagita (written: 柳田, lit. "willow ricefield") is a Japanese surname. Notable people with the surname include:

- Hiroki Yanagita (栁田 大輝; born 2003), Japanese sprinter
- Kunio Yanagita (柳田 國男; 1875–1962), Japanese scholar
- Miyuki Yanagita (柳田 美幸; born 1981), Japanese women's footballer
- Yuki Yanagita (柳田 悠岐; born 1988), Japanese baseball player

== See also ==
- Yanagita Station, a railway station in Yokote, Akita Prefecture, Japan
- Yanagida, a Japanese surname
