= Yokohama DeNA BayStars =

Nippon Professional Baseball team in the Central League

- 横浜DeNAベイスターズ

Logo	Cap insignia

Information
- League: Nippon Professional Baseball Central League (since 1950)
- Location: Naka-ku, Yokohama, Kanagawa, Japan
- Ballpark: Yokohama Stadium
- Founded: December 15, 1949; 76 years ago
- Japan Series championships: 3 (1960, 1998, 2024)
- CL pennants: 2 (1960, 1998)
- Playoff berths: 8 (2016, 2017, 2019, 2022, 2023, 2024, 2025, 2026)
- Former name: Yokohama BayStars (1993–2011); Yokohama Taiyo Whales (1978–1992); Taiyo Whales (1955–1977); Yosho Robins (1954); Taiyo Shochiku Robins (1953); Taiyo Whales (1950–1952)
- Former ballparks: Kawasaki Stadium (1955–1977); Osaka Stadium (1953–1954); Shimonoseki Baseball Stadium (1950–1952)
- Colors: Blue, White
- Mascot: DB.Starman and DB.Kirara
- Ownership: Tomoko Namba
- Management: DeNA Co., Ltd.
- Manager: Ryoji Aikawa
- Website: Japanese https://www.baystars.co.jp/ English https://www.baystars.co.jp/english/

Current uniforms

The Yokohama DeNA BayStars (横浜DeNAベイスターズ, Yokohama Dī-Enu-Ē Beisutāzu) are a professional baseball team in the Central League of Nippon Professional Baseball. Their home field is Yokohama Stadium, located in central Yokohama. The team has been known by several names since becoming a professional team in 1950. It adopted its current name in 2011, when the club was purchased by software company DeNA.

Through 2026, the franchise's all-time record is 4,536–5,504–332 (.452). The team's current manager is Ryoji Aikawa.

== History ==
=== Origin (1930s–1949) ===
The team began as the Taiyo Fishing Company, an amateur team currently affiliated with the Maruha Corporation (presently Maruha Nichiro). The team began to appear in national tournaments in the 1950s, and won the National Sports Festival in 1948, giving it national recognition. In the 1949 off-season, the Japanese professional baseball league removed many players from the Taiyo amateur team recruited to join the professional leagues. The owner of the Taiyo company decided to join the newly expanded Central League, which was established in 1950. The team's first professional incarnation was as the Maruha Team. The franchise was based in Shimonoseki, Yamaguchi.

=== Taiyo Whales (1950–1952) ===
The team name was changed to the Taiyō Whales (大洋ホエールズ, Taiyō Hoēruzu) shortly after the start of the 1950 season. The Whales received several veteran players from the Yomiuri Giants to compensate for their lack of players, but ended up in the bottom half of the standings each year.

In 1951, there was talk of merging with the Hiroshima Carp, which had experienced serious financial problems but the merging never occurred due to massive protests from Hiroshima citizens.

=== Taiyo Shochiku Robins (1953) and Yo-Sho Robins (1954) ===
In 1952, it was decided that teams ending the season with a winning percentage below .300 would be disbanded or merged with other teams. The Shochiku Robins fell into this category, and were merged with the Taiyo Whales to become the Taiyō-Shochiku Robins (大洋松竹ロビンス, Taiyō Shōchiku Robinsu) in January, 1953. However, the team's re-organization was not completed in time for the 1953 season, and the team ended up continuing its offices in both Shimonoseki and Kyoto. Home games took place in Osaka for geographical reasons, and the team's finances were managed by both the Taiyo and Shochiku companies until the franchise was officially transferred to Osaka in 1954, to become the Yō-Shō Robins (洋松ロビンス, Yō-Shō Robinsu).

The Shochiku Robins had won the 1950 Central League championship before being merged.

=== Taiyo Whales (1955–1977) ===
The Shochiku company discontinued its support in December, 1954, and the team name returned to the Taiyo Whales. The franchise moved to Kawasaki, Kanagawa, and obtained an exclusive home field, (Kawasaki Stadium), but ended up in last place six years in a row from 1954–1959.

In 1960, the team recruited Osamu Mihara, who had been manager of the Nishitetsu Lions the previous year. Mihara led the team to its first pennant in 1960, and swept the Daimai Orions in the 1960 Japan Series. The team had been in last place the previous year. The year was also highlighted with pitcher Gentaro Shimada, just 2 weeks before his 21st birthday, throwing the first no-hitter and perfect game in Whales history, becoming the youngest player to do so until Roki Sasaki did so in 2022.

However, this success did not last long, and the team quickly fell back into last place in 1961. The Whales made a comeback in 1962, but trailed four games behind the Hanshin Tigers to end up in second place. They lost the league championship again to the Tigers in 1964, only one game (.008 winning percentage) away from first place.

The team produced countless star players during the 1970s, but rarely ended the season above the .500 mark. The small Kawasaki Stadium made the Whales one of the most offensively productive teams in Japanese baseball history, but a weak pitching staff, and lack of financial support put the team out of serious contention.

By 1976, the team had been planning on moving from Kawasaki to Yokohama, and support from the mayor of Yokohama allowed the team to gain financial support from the Kokudo Company. 55% of the team's share was retained by Taiyo, and the other 45% went to Kokudo.

=== Yokohama Taiyo Whales (1978–1992) ===
In 1978, the team moved to the newly-completed Yokohama Stadium in central Yokohama. The team name was changed to the Yokohama Taiyo Whales (横浜大洋ホエールズ, Yokohama Taiyō Hoēruzu) to reflect the team's new home town. The Kokudo Company sold its shares of the team to the Nippon Broadcasting System and TBS. The Nippon Broadcasting System obtained 30% of the shares, and TBS bought 15%, while Taiyo kept its 55%. The team enjoyed far more popularity during this period than in previous years, but continued to post only meager results in the standings, with their best placing being in 1979, when they finished second behind the Hiroshima Toyo Carp.

=== Yokohama BayStars (1993–2011) ===
In November 1992, Taiyo changed its name to the Maruha Corporation, as the company decided to discontinue the Taiyo brand due to restrictions on whaling in Japan, and renamed the team as the Yokohama BayStars (横浜ベイスターズ, Yokohama Beisutāzu). Originally, they were meant to be the Yokohama Bay Stars (Stars would be the team's nickname), in reference to the Yokohama Bay Bridge, but was changed to BayStars when fans began referring to them as that. The BayStars were the first Japanese professional baseball team not to include the name of the parent company in the team name.

Originally, the team was going to be renamed simply to the Yokohama Whales, but new restrictions on whaling in Japan convinced the company to drop the original name. Some superstitious fans had believed that dead whales put a curse onto the team (the Maruha Corporation was famous for its whale meat products), preventing the Whales from winning championships. In his visit to the United States, Japanese Prime Minister Kiichi Miyazawa remarked to the then-president Bill Clinton (who had proposed the international restriction on whaling) that the Maruha Corporation's decision was reflective of Japan's change in attitude towards whaling.

The BayStars remained a non-contender during the early 1990s, but gradually assembled the players that would contribute to the team's championship in 1998. Akihiko Ohya became the manager in 1996, and almost caught up to the Yakult Swallows in 1997, ending in second place. Hiroshi Gondo (a pitching coach the previous year) became manager in 1998, and the BayStars won their first league championship in 38 years in 1998, defeating the Seibu Lions to win the Japanese championship series. The team's consistent hitting, impeccable defense, (players from the BayStars won five golden glove awards in 1998) and solid pitching staff (rounded by closer Kazuhiro Sasaki) contributed to an epic 1998 season. The BayStars' offense in the '98 season became known as the "Machine Gun Offense" because of the quick succession of hits the Yokohama batters would get (mostly singles), and no game was ever over until the final out was recorded. Players who made up the Machine Gun Offense included Bobby Rose, Takuro Ishii, Motonobu Tanishige, Glenn Braggs (who left in 1996), and Takanori Suzuki.

The team dropped to third place in 1999 despite having the best offense in Japan and also setting a league record for team batting average at .294, alongside Rose breaking the Central League hits record, and would not be in serious contention for the championship until 2016. A major cause of this was due to the collapse of Yokohama's pitching staff, as while the offense was good, the fact that Yokohama Stadium was more of a hitter friendly park, due to its outfield dimensions, would need them to have good pitching, alongside other factors, including Sasaki leaving for the Seattle Mariners in 2000, not being able to give a new contract to Rose, Tanishige leaving for the Dragons, and Takashi Saito leaving for the Los Angeles Dodgers. In 2001, the Maruha Corporation sold its remaining shares to TBS, giving TBS full ownership of the team, with the only stipulation being that TBS was not allowed to put their name in the team's name. Akihiko Ohya returned in 2007 after leaving the team in 1997. In 2009 the team finished at the bottom of the league despite having a few young stars on the team like slugger Shuichi Murata and league batting champion Seiichi Uchikawa, and also having the pitching of Daisuke Miura and the signing of foreign star Ryan Glynn.

On May 18, 2009, The BayStars' management announced it had fired Ohya and appointed Tomio Tashiro as an acting manager.

=== Yokohama DeNA BayStars (since 2012) ===
In 2011, the franchise was acquired by a mobile telephone game company DeNA for 9.5 billion yen. The name was changed to reflect this, and they changed their mascot from Hosshey to Starman, who wore the new uniform. The team stated their aim at making a profit within the first three years while also doing new promotional gimmicks such as offering discounted tickets to men who came to the ballpark dressed in drag on Thursdays, saving 2,000 yen on select days for a reserved seat with the wearing of a team jersey, and offering fans a refund if they are unhappy with the team losing or getting a partial refund with a win/tie. They also negotiated a new lease deal with the city for less ticket revenue shared that saw the team put a LED screen above the outfield wall.

In October 2015, Alex Ramírez, a former BayStars player and the only foreign-born player to have 2,000 hits in Japanese baseball, was named as manager for the 2016 season. He replaced Kiyoshi Nakahata, who resigned at the end of 2015 to take responsibility for the club's poor performance. In 2016, Yokohama DeNA BayStars finished the regular season in third place (69–71–3), 19.5 games behind the league leader Hiroshima Toyo Carp (89–52–3). Defeating the second place Yomiuri Giants two games to one in the first stage of the Climax Series, the BayStars advanced to the Climax Series Final but lost to the Carp in five games.

In 2017, the BayStars again finished the regular season in third place (73–65–5) 14.5 games behind the league leader Hiroshima Toyo Carp (88–51–4). Their .252 team batting average and 134 home runs were both second best in the Central League. In the first round of the Climax Series, the BayStars defeated the second place Hanshin Tigers in three games and advanced to the Climax Series Final. Although losing the first game against the Hiroshima Toyo Carp, the BayStars won the next four games to become 2017 Central League Climax Series Champions for the first time in 19 years. José López was the most valuable player (MVP) of the Central League Climax Series. The BayStars advanced to the 2017 Japan Series against the Pacific League Champion Fukuoka Softbank Hawks. The Hawks won the first three games of the series. Facing elimination, the BayStars won Games 4 and 5. At home in game 6, with the BayStars leading 3–2, the Hawks' Seiichi Uchikawa hit a game-tying solo home run off of the BayStars' star closer, Yasuaki Yamasaki. Keizo Kawashima hit the walk-off RBI single for SoftBank in the eleventh inning for the title. Hawks' pitcher Dennis Sarfate, with two saves and a Game 6 win, was named the Japan Series Most Valuable Player (MVP). Toshiro Miyazaki won the Fighting Spirit Award, given to the best player on the losing team. It was the first Japan Series loss for the team.

On March 13, 2023, Trevor Bauer agreed to an incentive-laden one-year, $4 million contract with the Yokohama DeNA BayStars.

The following year, the BayStars signed both Andre Jackson and Anthony Kay, and in the middle of the season, signed Mike Ford, who would hit a walk off home run in his debut on the major league team. This, alongside the already existing power bats of Shugo Maki and 2024 CL Batting Champion Tyler Austin, and Katsuki Azuma taking over the ace spot after Shota Imanaga left for Major League Baseball, powered the BayStars to a 3rd place finish, alongside a fall from grace by the Hiroshima Toyo Carp by late August and September, qualifying them to the Central League Climax Series with a record of 71–69–3 (.507). They would sweep the Hanshin Tigers in the First Stage, then beat the Central League pennant winning Yomiuri Giants in six games to advance to the 2024 Japan Series, setting up a rematch with the Fukuoka SoftBank Hawks. This time, despite losing the first two games, the BayStars would make a comeback to win the next four, including two seven-inning shutouts by Kay and Jackson in Games 4 and 5, respectively, to win their first Japan Series since 1998. Masayuki Kuwahara, after tying a Japan Series record with nine RBIs, was named Japan Series Most Valuable Player, while Yoshi Tsutsugo, Jackson, and Kay, all won Outstanding Players Honors. With the championship, the BayStars became the team with the lowest winning percentage to win a Japan Series and had the fewest number of wins to win one since the Yakult Swallows did so in 1978 (who won 68 of 130 games).

== Season-by-season record ==
Note: GP = Games played, W = Wins, L = Losses, T = Ties, % = Win Percentage

Season	GP	W	L	T	%	GB	Finish	Playoffs
2016	143	69	71	3	.493	19.5	3rd, Central	Lost Climax Series Final Stage, 1–4 (Carp)
2017	143	73	65	5	.529	14.5	3rd, Central	Lost Japan Series (Hawks) 2–4
2018	143	67	74	2	.475	14.0	4th, Central	Did not qualify
2019	143	71	69	3	.519	4.5	2nd, Central	Lost Climax Series First Stage (Tigers) 1–2
2020	120	56	58	6	.491	12	4th, Central	Did not qualify
2021	143	54	73	16	.425	20	6th, Central	Did not qualify
2022	143	73	68	2	.518	8	2nd, Central	Lost Climax Series First Stage (Tigers) 1−2
2023	143	74	66	3	.529	12	3rd, Central	Lost Climax Series First Stage (Carp) 0−2
2024	143	71	69	3	.507	8	3rd, Central	Won Japan Series (Hawks) 4–2
2025	143	71	66	6	.518	13	2nd, Central	Lost Climax Series Second Stage (Tigers) 0–4

== Roster ==
Yokohama DeNA BayStars roster
First team		Second team
Pitchers: 11 Katsuki Azuma; 13 Hiromu Ise; 19 Yasuaki Yamasaki; 20 Yuya Sakamoto; 30 Kentaro Shinogi; 36 Shuto Ogata; 39 Naoki Wakamatsu; 49 José Ruiz; 54 Yutaro Ishida; 59 Kentarō Taira; 62 Sean Reynolds; 64 Koh Nakagawa; 65 Daita Miyagi; 68 Masaki Iwata; 92 Hayato Horioka; Catchers: 5 Shion Matsuo; 10 Yasutaka Tobashira; 60 Takeru Furuichi	Infielders: 9 Yōta Kyōda; 25 Yoshi Tsutsugo; 26 Masaki Mimori; 31 Tatsuhiro Shibata; 40 Tomoya Inoue; 44 Taiki Ishikami; 51 Toshiro Miyazaki; Outfielders: 4 Ryuki Watarai; 7 Keita Sano; 8 Kazuki Kamizato; 28 Atsushi Katsumata; 61 Tatsuo Ebina; 99 Cooper Hummel; Manager: 81 Ryoji Aikawa; Coaches: 72 Kenjiro Tsuruoka (Offense chief); 80 Ryoji Aikawa (Defense chief / Battery); 79 Shinji Ohara (Pitching chief); 90 Iwao Ohmura (Hitting); 97 Hiroyasu Tanaka (Infield / Baserunning); 74 Yusuke Kawada (Outfield / Baserunning); 73 Kazuya Fujita (Development Coordinator / Hitting); 94 Yota Kosugi (Pitching); 71 Ken Katoh (Battery)	Pitchers: 0 Jon Duplantier; 12 Yu Takeda; 14 Kenta Ishida; 15 Shunya Shimada; 16 Shinichi Ohnuki; 18 Kenta Kozono; 22 Taisei Irie; 24 Teruki Yoshino; 27 Shintaro Fujinami; 33 Riku Takeda; 35 Tatsuya Hashimoto; 38 Ryoto Matsumoto; 41 Chihaya Sasaki; 42 Austin Cox; 43 Osuke Fukazawa; 45 Kohei Morihara; 46 Kasuga Sakaguchi; 47 Hiromi Katayama; 53 Hayate Nakagawa; 93 Haruto Shoji; 98 Hansel Marcelino; Catchers: 32 Kyosuke Mashiko; 57 Junpei Azuma; 95 Ryuhei Kuki	Infielders: 00 Takuma Hayashi; 2 Shugo Maki; 3 Koichiro Oda; 6 Keito Mori; 34 Asahi Miyashita; 37 Hibiki Katoh; 48 Shuto Naruse; 56 Manato Tanai; Outfielders: 55 Kento Inoue; 58 Kōki Kajiwara; 63 Taiki Sekine; 67 Shōnosuke Hama; Manager: 75 Shuichi Murata; Coaches: 70 Toshiya Tsuji (Hitting); 87 Shigeru Kaga (Pitching assistant); 88 Yusaku Iriki (Pitching chief); 85 Shigeo Yanagida (Infield / Baserunning); 78 Tatsuya Shindo (Infield / Baserunning); 77 Takanori Suzuki (Development Coordinator / Hitting); 86 Yoshiki Yagi (Pitching); 84 Yoshinori Ueda (Outfield / Baserunning) (Hitting); 89 Daisuke Nakai (Outfield / Baserunning) (Offense chief); (Patrol): 82 Takashi Manei (Training Coordinator / Fielding); 79 Shinji Ohara {(Patrol / Hitting); 76 Tomio Tashiro (Hitting)
Development Players
052 Masumi Hamachi (P); 102 Manato Shimizu (P); 103 Kōki Kanabuchi (P); 106 Aki Watanabe (P); 115 Kosuke Baba (P); 125 Soh Ogasawara (IF); 127 Ryota Joko (C); 129 Kenji Nishimaki (IF); 130 Taiga Kondoh (C); 131 Uta Shimizu (IF); 136 Ryudai Morishita (P); 140 Ryunosuke Matsumoto (P); 155 Daiki Kobari (OF); 193 Ikumi Takamizawa (IF)
Updated June 3, 2026		→ All NPB rosters

=== Former players ===
- (Japan) Noboru Akiyama – P (秋山登: 1956–1967)
- (Japan) Kazuhiko Kondo – 1B, OF (近藤和彦: 1958–1972)
- (Japan) Makoto Matsubara – 1B (松原誠: 1962–1980)
- (Japan) Masaji Hiramatsu – P (平松政次: 1967–1984)
- (Japan) Masayuki Nakatsuka – 1B, OF (中塚政幸: 1968–1982)
- (United States) John Sipin – 2B (ジョン・シピン: 1972–1977)
- (Japan) Yoshikazu Takagi – OF, 1B (高木義和: 1972–1987)
- (Japan) Keiichi Nagasaki – OF (長崎慶一: 1973–1984)
- (Japan) Daisuke Yamashita – SS, 2B, 3B (山下大輔: 1974–1987)
- (Japan) Tomio Tashiro – 3B, 1B, OF (田代富雄: 1976–1991)
- (Puerto Rico) Félix Millán – 2B, 1B (フェリクス・ミヤーン: 1978–1980)
- (Japan) Akio Saito – P (斉藤明夫: 1977–1993)
- (Japan) Kazuhiko Endoh – P (遠藤一彦: 1978–1992)
- (Japan) Kaname Yashiki – CF (屋鋪要: 1978–1993)
- (Japan) Mitsuo Motoi – 2B, SS, 3B (基満男: 1979–1984)
- (Japan) Yutaka Takagi – 2B, SS (高木豊: 1981–1993)
- (Japan) Kenichi Yamazaki – OF (山崎賢一: 1981–1993)
- (Japan) Yutaka Saotome – P (五月女豊: 1982–1984)
- (United States) Jim Tracy – OF (ジム・トレイシー: 1983–1984)
- (United States) Leon Lee – 3B (レオン・リー: 1983–1985)
- (Japan) Hirokazu Katoh – LF (加藤博一: 1983–1990)
- (Japan) Mitsunori Kakehata – P (欠端光則: 1984–1994)
- (Puerto Rico) Carlos Ponce – 1B (カルロス・ポンセ: 1986–1990)
- (Japan) Hisao Niura – P (新浦壽夫: 1987–1991)
- (Japan) Denney Tomori – P (デニー友利, デニー: 1987–1996, 2003–2004)
- (United States) Jim Paciorek – 1B, LF (ジム・パチョレック: 1988–1991)
- (Japan) Tatsuya Shindoh – SS, 3B (進藤達哉: 1988–2000)
- (Japan) Hiroki Nomura – P (野村弘樹: 1988–2002)
- (Japan) Motonobu Tanishige – C (谷繁元信: 1989–2001)
- (Japan) Takuro Ishii – SS, 3B, P (石井琢朗: 1989–2008)
- (Japan) Kazuhiro Sasaki – P (佐々木主浩: 1990–1999, 2004–2005)
- (Japan) Takanori Suzuki – OF (鈴木尚典: 1991–2008)
- (United States) R. J. Reynolds – OF (R.J. レイノルズ: 1991–1992)
- (Japan) Takashi Saito – P (斎藤隆: 1992–2005)
- (Japan) Daisuke Miura – P (三浦大輔: 1992–2016)
- (Japan) Hideki Igarashi – P (五十嵐英樹: 1991–2001)
- (United States) Glenn Braggs – RF (グレン・グラッグス: 1993–1996)
- (United States) Robert Rose – 2B (ロバート・ローズ: 1993–2000)
- (Japan) Takahiro Saeki – 1B, OF (佐伯貴弘: 1993–2010)
- (Japan) Tomokazu Ohka – P (大家友和: 1994–1998, 2010–2011)
- (Japan) Norihiro Komada – 1B (駒田徳広: 1994–2000)
- (Japan) Toshio Haru – CF (波留敏夫: 1994–2001)
- (Japan) Ryoji Aikawa – C (相川亮二:1995–2008)
- (Japan) Kazuo Fukumori – P (福盛和男: 1995–2003)
- (Japan) Takeo Kawamura – P (川村丈夫:1997–2008)
- (Japan) Tatsuhiko Kinjo – OF (金城龍彦:1999–2014)
- (Japan) Atsushi Kizuka – P (木塚敦志:2000–2010)
- (Japan) Hitoshi Taneda – 2B (種田仁:2001–2007)
- (Japan) Seiichi Uchikawa – 1B, OF (内川聖一:2001–2010)
- (Japan) Shuichi Murata – 3B (村田修一: 2003–2011)
- (Japan) Yuki Yoshimura – RF (吉村裕基: 2003–2012)
- (United States) Tyrone Woods – 1B (タイロン・ウッズ:2003–2004)
- (Japan) Ken Kadokura – P (門倉健:2004–2006)
- (United States) Marc Kroon – P (マーク・クルーン: 2005–2007)
- (Japan) Kazuya Fujita – 2B (藤田一也: 2005–2012, 2022–2023)
- (Japan) Takayuki Kajitani – OF (梶谷隆幸: 2007–2020)
- (Japan) Kenjiro Tanaka – P (田中健二朗: 2008–2023)
- (United States) Stephen Randolph – P (スティーブン・ランドルフ: 2009–2010, 2011)
- (United States) Brett Harper – 1B (ブレット・ハーパー: 2010–2011)
- (Japan) Norihiro Nakamura – 3B (中村紀洋: 2011–2014)
- (Venezuela) Alex Ramírez – OF (アレックス・ラミレス: 2012–2013)
- (Japan) Tomo Otosaka – OF (乙坂智: 2012–2021)
- (Dominican Republic) Tony Blanco – 1B (トニ・ブランコ: 2013–2014)
- (Cuba) Yuli Gurriel – IF (ユリ・グリエル: 2014–2015)
- (Venezuela) Guillermo Moscoso – P (ギジェルモ・モスコーソ: 2014–2016)
- (Japan) Tomoya Mikami – P (三上朋也: 2014–2022)
- (Japan) Yoshiki Sunada – P (砂田毅樹: 2014–2022)
- (Japan) Seiya Hosokawa – OF (細川成也: 2017–2022)
- (Venezuela) Edwin Escobar – P (エドウィン・エスコバー: 2017–2023)
- (Puerto Rico) Neftalí Soto – 1B, 3B (ネフタリ・ソト: 2018–2023)
- (Japan) Yamato – IF (前田大和, 大和: 2018–2024)
- (Venezuela) Yofrec Diaz – P (ジョフレック・ディアス: 2020–2025)
- (Dominican Republic) Fernando Romero – P (フェルナンド・ロメロ: 2021–2022)

=== Retired numbers ===
None

=== Honored numbers ===
- 18 (Japan) Daisuke Miura
- 22 (Japan) Kazuhiro Sasaki

=== MLB players ===
Current:

- Shota Imanaga (since 2024)
- Trevor Bauer (2023, 2025)

Former:

- Yuli Gurriel (2014–2015)
- Tomo Ohka (1999–2009)
- Takashi Saito (2006–2012)
- Kazuhiro Sasaki (2000–2003)
- Kazuo Fukumori (2008)
- Yoshi Tsutsugo (2020–2022)
- Joe Stanka (1966)

== Mascots ==
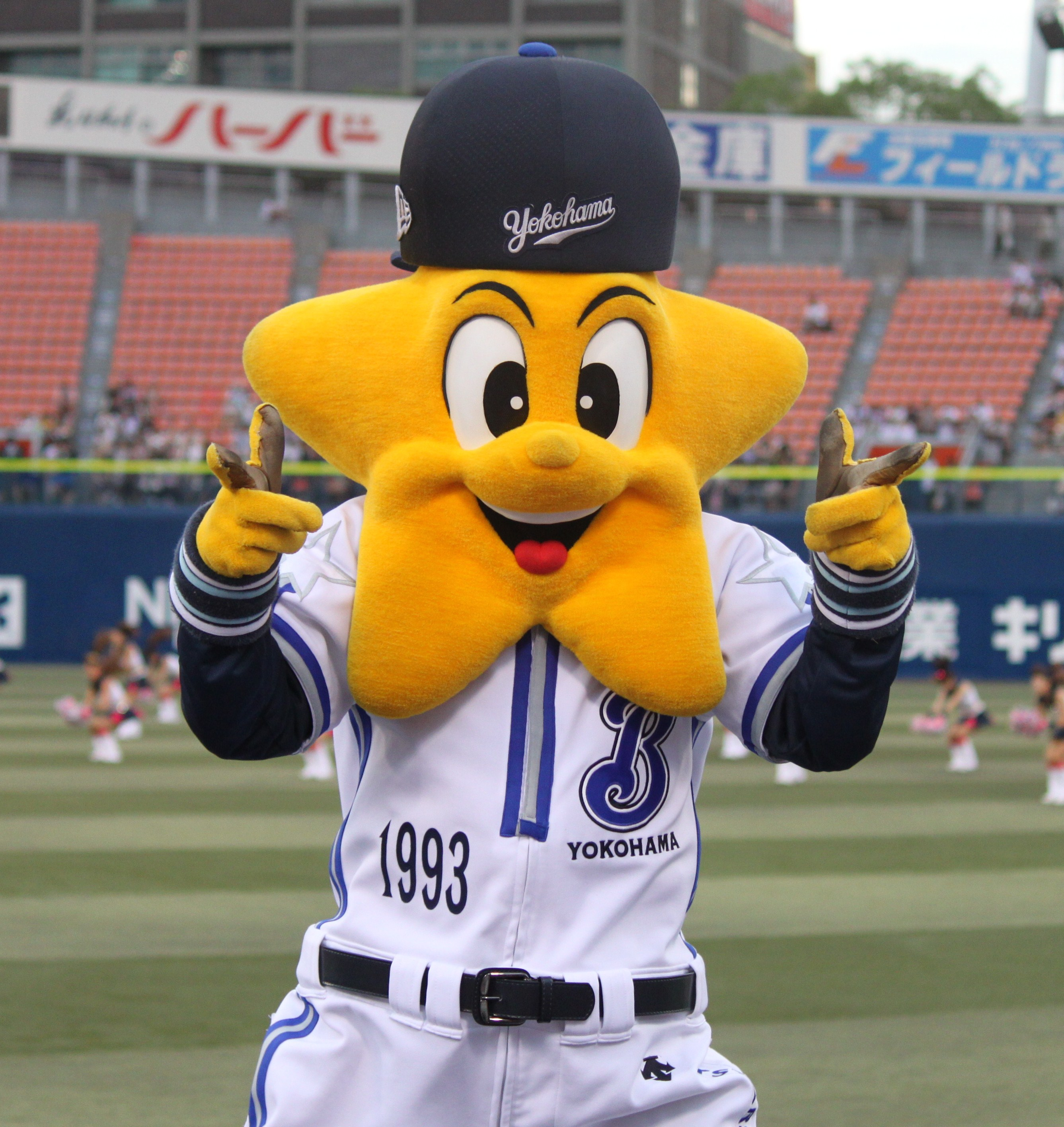
Hossizo

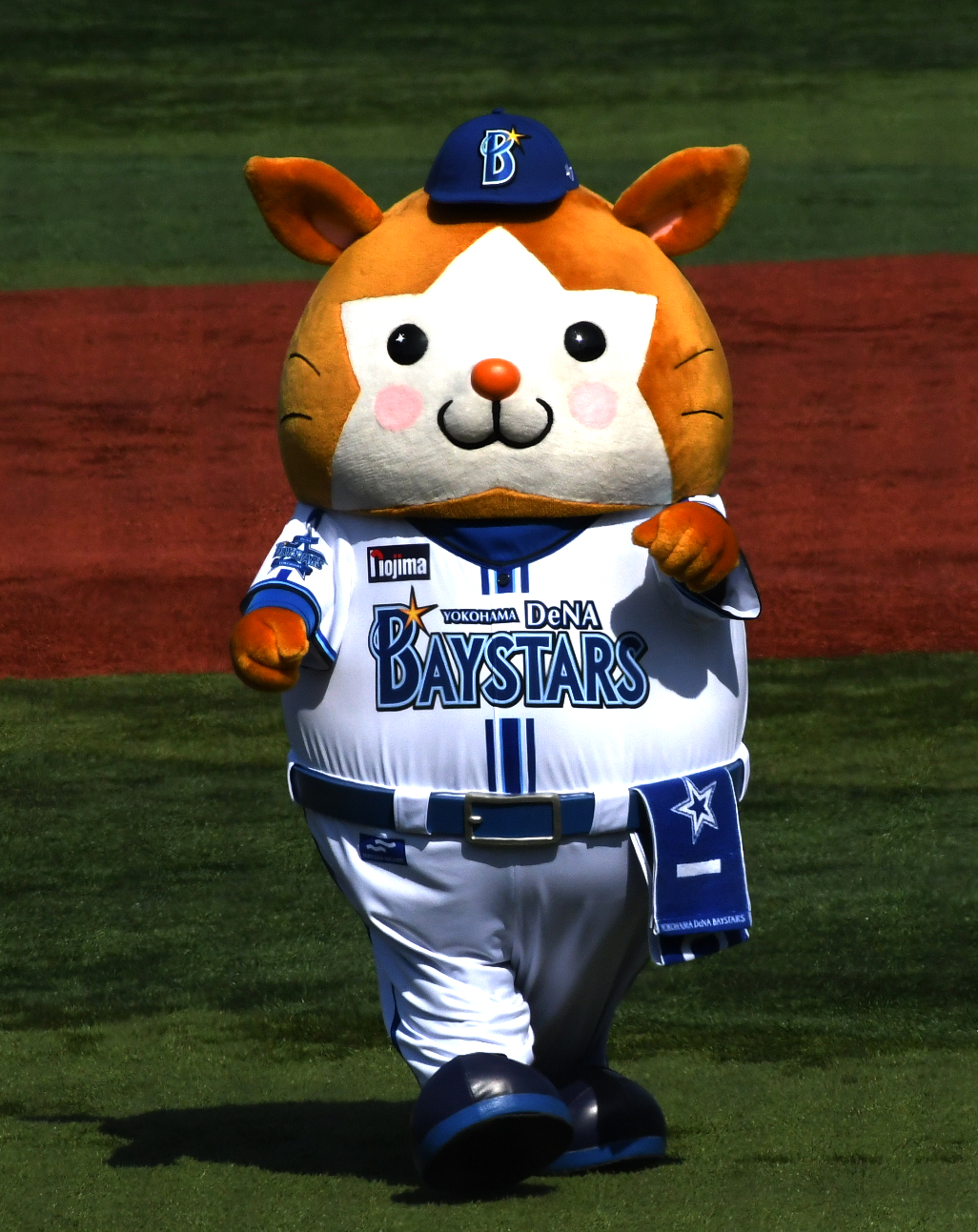
DB.Starman

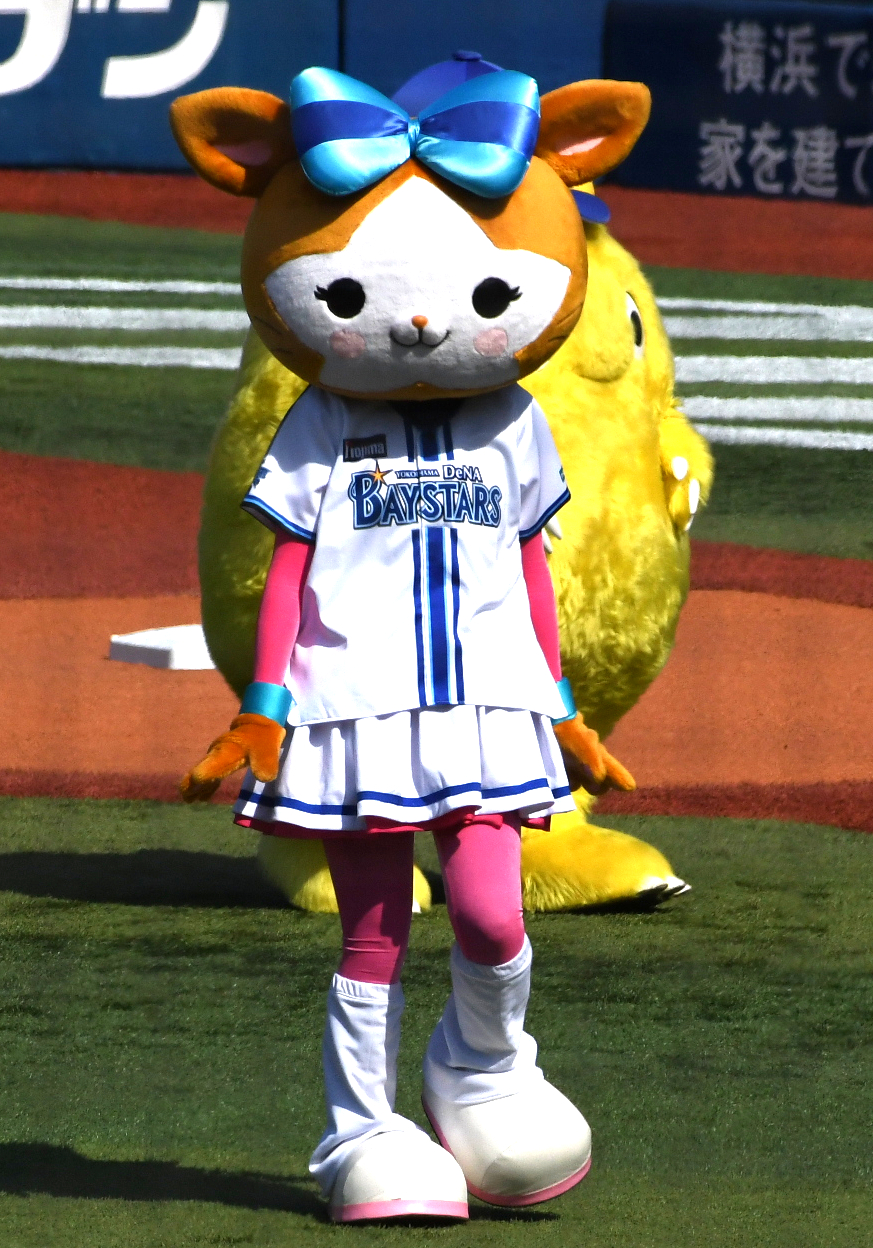
DB.Kirara

They have been represented by various star-themed characters such as:

- Hosshey (ホッシー) 1993–2012
- Hossiena (ホッシーナ) 1993–2012
- Hossizo (ホッシーゾ) 1993–2012
- DB.Starman (DB.スターマン) 2012–
- DB.Kirara (DB.キララ) 2012–
- DB.Rider (DB.ライダー) 2012–2016
- Bart (バート) 2014-
- Chapy (チャピー) 2014-

== Minor league team ==
The Baystars farm team plays in the Eastern League. It was founded in 1950. The minor league team shares the same name and uniform as the parent team and they play the majority of their home games at Yokosuka Stadium, located in Yokosuka, Kanagawa.

== See also ==
- Maruha Nichiro Holdings, Inc.
- TBS Holdings
