= Yoshinori Ueda (baseball) =

Japanese baseball player and coach (born 1973)

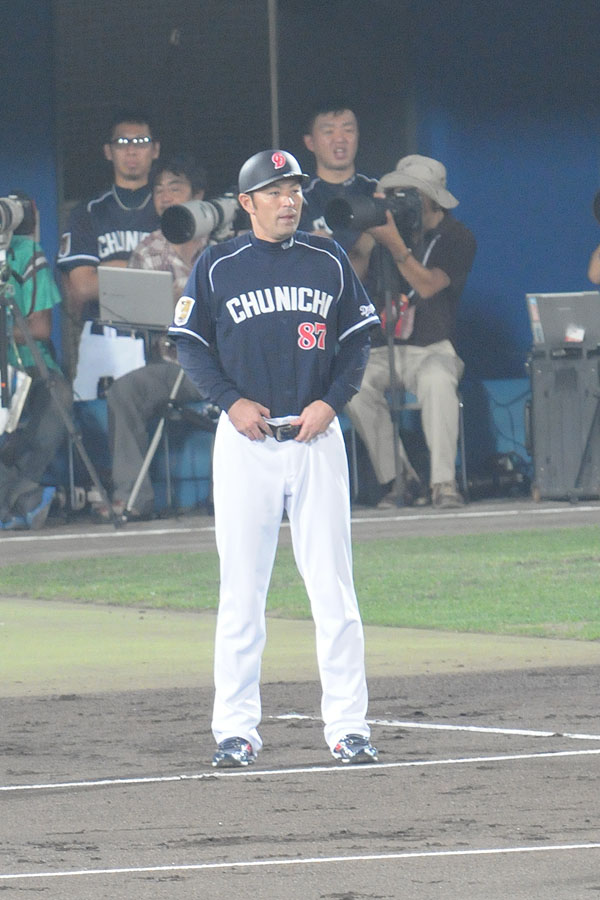

Yokohama DeNA BayStars – No. 84
- Outfielder/Coach
- Born: November 18, 1973 (age 52); Matsumoto, Nagano, Japan
- Batted: Left Threw: Right

NPB debut
- April 1, 1995, for the Hokkaido Nippon-Ham Fighters

Last NPB appearance
- September 27, 2008, for the Chunichi Dragons

NPB statistics (through 2008)
- Batting average: .236
- Hits: 486
- Home runs: 37
- RBIs: 192

Teams
- As player: Nippon-Ham Fighters/Hokkaido Nippon-Ham Fighters (1992–2005); Chunichi Dragons (2006–2008); As coach: Chunichi Dragons (2009–2015, 2023–2024); Yokohama DeNA BayStars (2016–2020, 2025-Present); Hokkaido Nippon-Ham Fighters (2021-2022)

Yoshinori Ueda (上田 佳範, Ueda Yoshinori; born November 18, 1973 in Matsumoto, Nagano, Japan) is a former professional Japanese baseball player.
