= Taiki Sekine =

Japanese baseball player (born 1995)

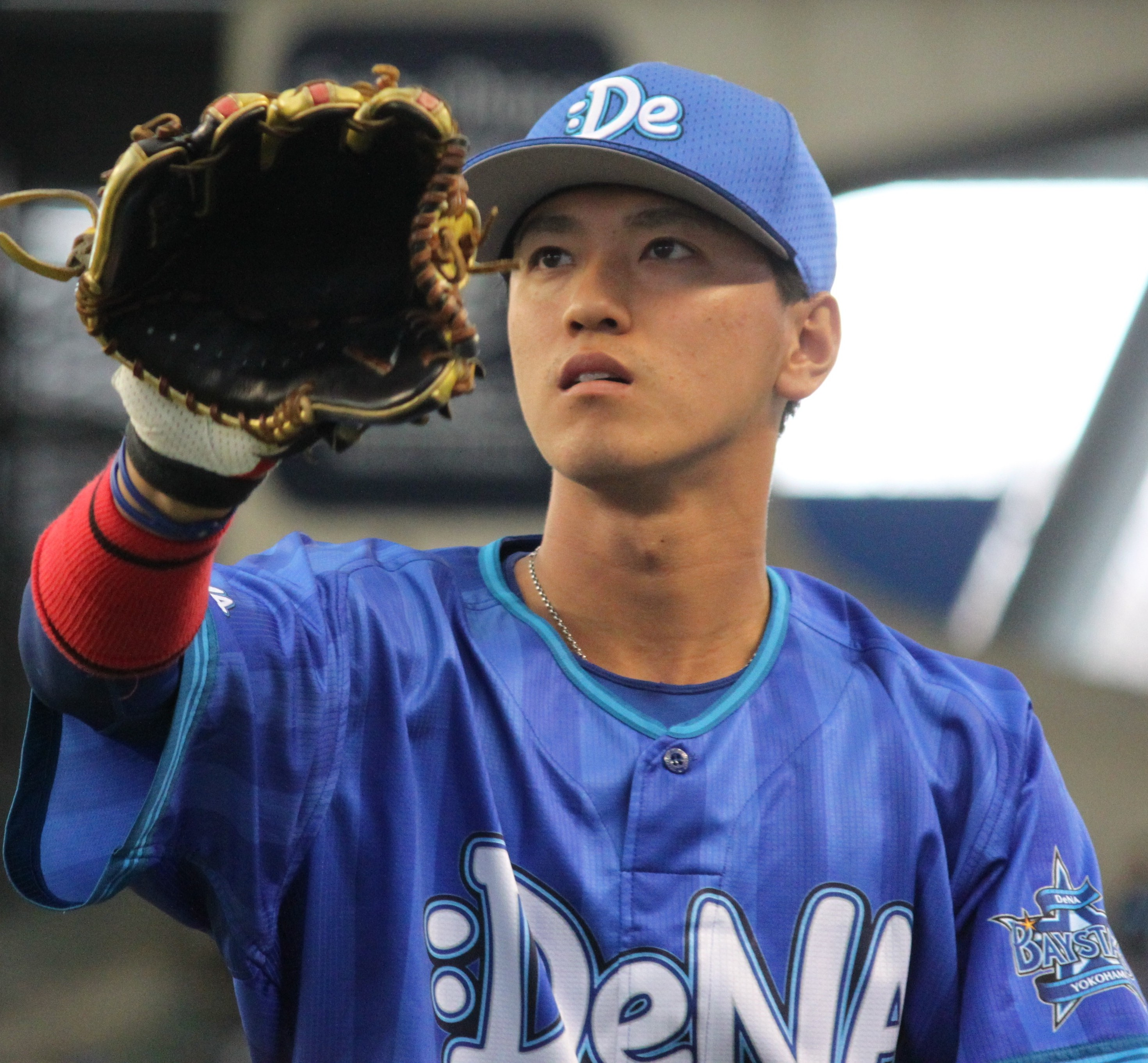
- Sekine with the Yokohama DeNA BayStars

Yokohama DeNA BayStars – No. 63
- Outfielder
- Born: June 28, 1995 (age 30); Kanie, Aichi, Japan
- Bats: Left Throws: Left

NPB debut
- October 4, 2014, for the Yokohama DeNA BayStars

NPB statistics (through 2024 season)
- Batting average: .238
- Hits: 300
- Home runs: 7
- RBI: 73
- Stats at Baseball Reference

Teams
- Yokohama DeNA BayStars (2014–present)

Career highlights and awards
- NPB All-Star (2023)

Taiki Sekine (関根 大気, Sekine Taiki; born June 28, 1995) is a professional Japanese baseball player. He plays outfield for the Yokohama DeNA BayStars.
