= Shinichi Ohnuki =

Japanese baseball player (born 1994)

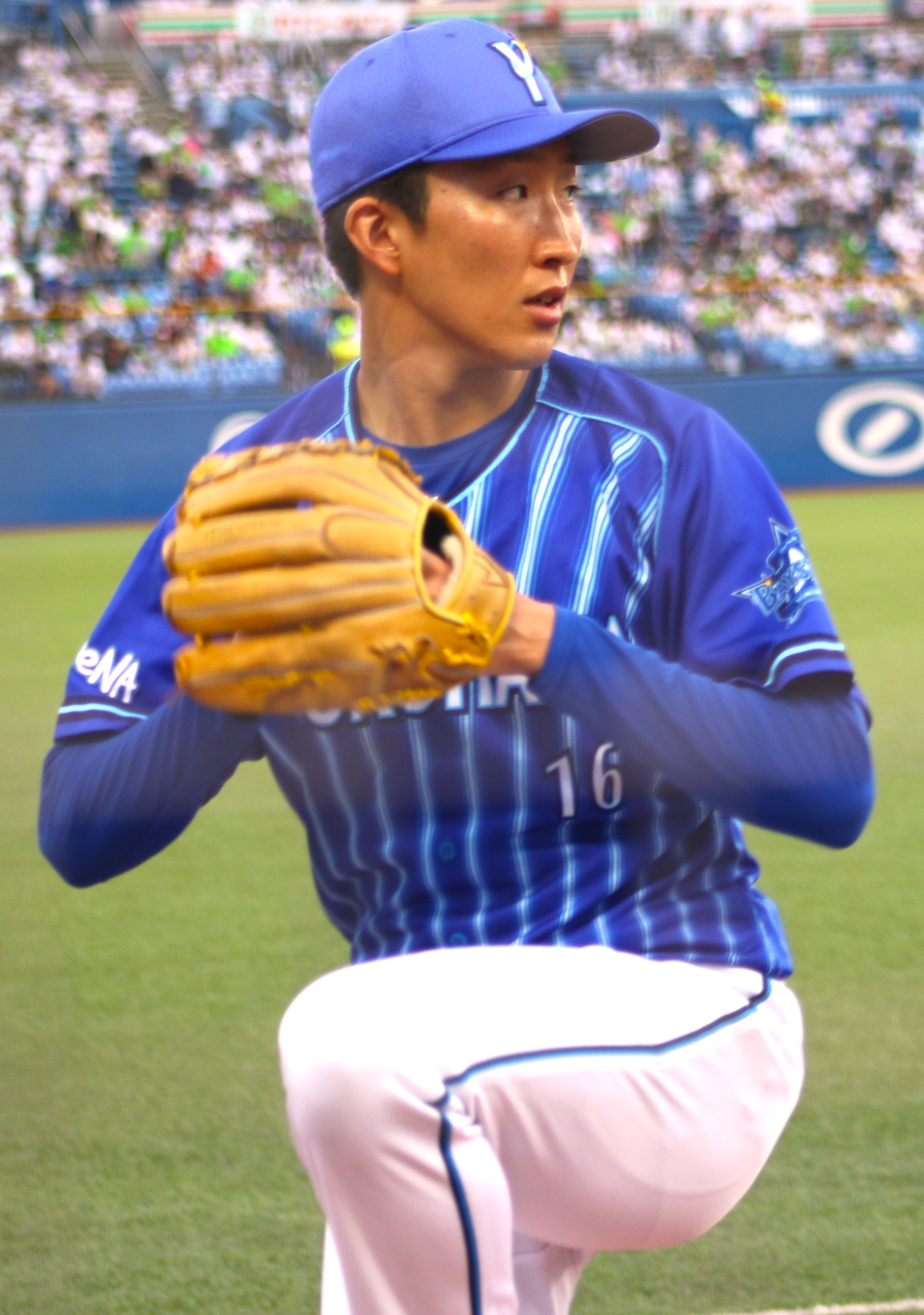
- Ohnuki with the Yokohama DeNA BayStars

Yokohama DeNA BayStars – No. 16
- Pitcher
- Born: February 3, 1994 (age 32); Yokohama, Kanagawa, Japan
- Bats: Right Throws: Right

NPB debut
- April 4, 2019, for the Yokohama DeNA BayStars

Career statistics (through 2024 season)
- Win–loss record: 44-37
- Earned Run Average: 3.30
- Strikeouts: 472
- Stats at Baseball Reference

Teams
- Yokohama DeNA BayStars (2019–present)

Shinichi Ohnuki (大貫 晋一, Ohnuki Shinichi; born February 3, 1994 in Yokohama, Kanagawa, Japan) is a professional Japanese baseball player. He plays pitcher for the Yokohama DeNA BayStars.
