= Taiki Ishikami =

Japanese baseball player (born 2001)

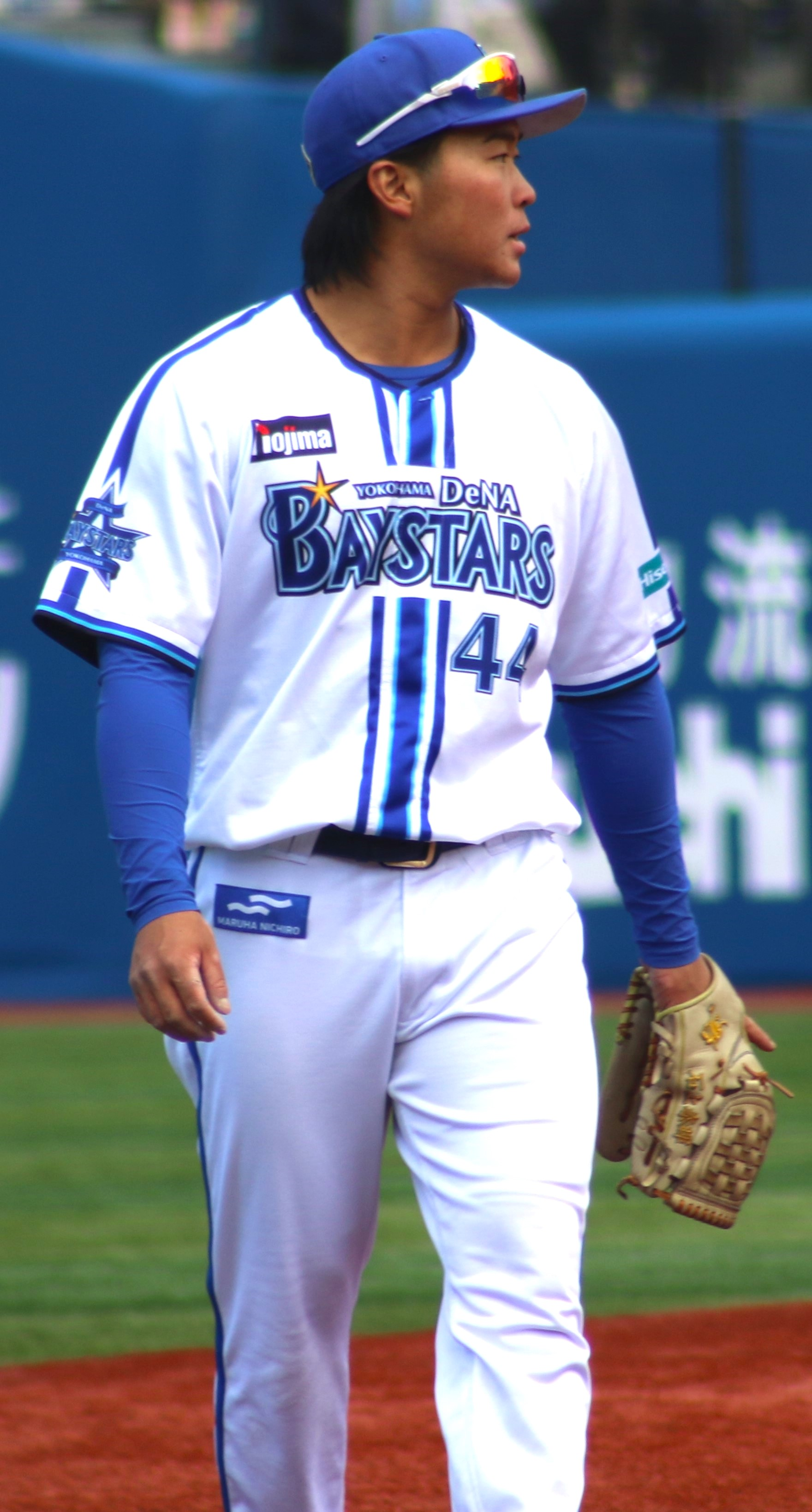
- Ishikami with the Yokohama DeNA BayStars

Yokohama DeNA BayStars – No. 44
- Infielder
- Born: May 18, 2001 (age 24); Naruto, Tokushima, Japan
- Bats: Left Throws: Right

NPB debut
- March 29, 2024, for the Yokohama DeNA BayStars

Career statistics (through 2025 season)
- Batting average: .218
- Hits: 47
- Home runs: 2
- RBIs: 19
- Stolen bases: 5

Teams
- Yokohama DeNA BayStars (2024–present)

Career highlights and awards
- Japan Series champion (2024)

Taiki Ishikami (石上 泰輝, Ishikami Taiki; born May 18, 2001 in Naruto, Tokushima, Japan) is a professional Japanese baseball player. He plays infielder for the Yokohama DeNA BayStars.
