= Teruki Yoshino =

Japanese baseball player (born 1998)

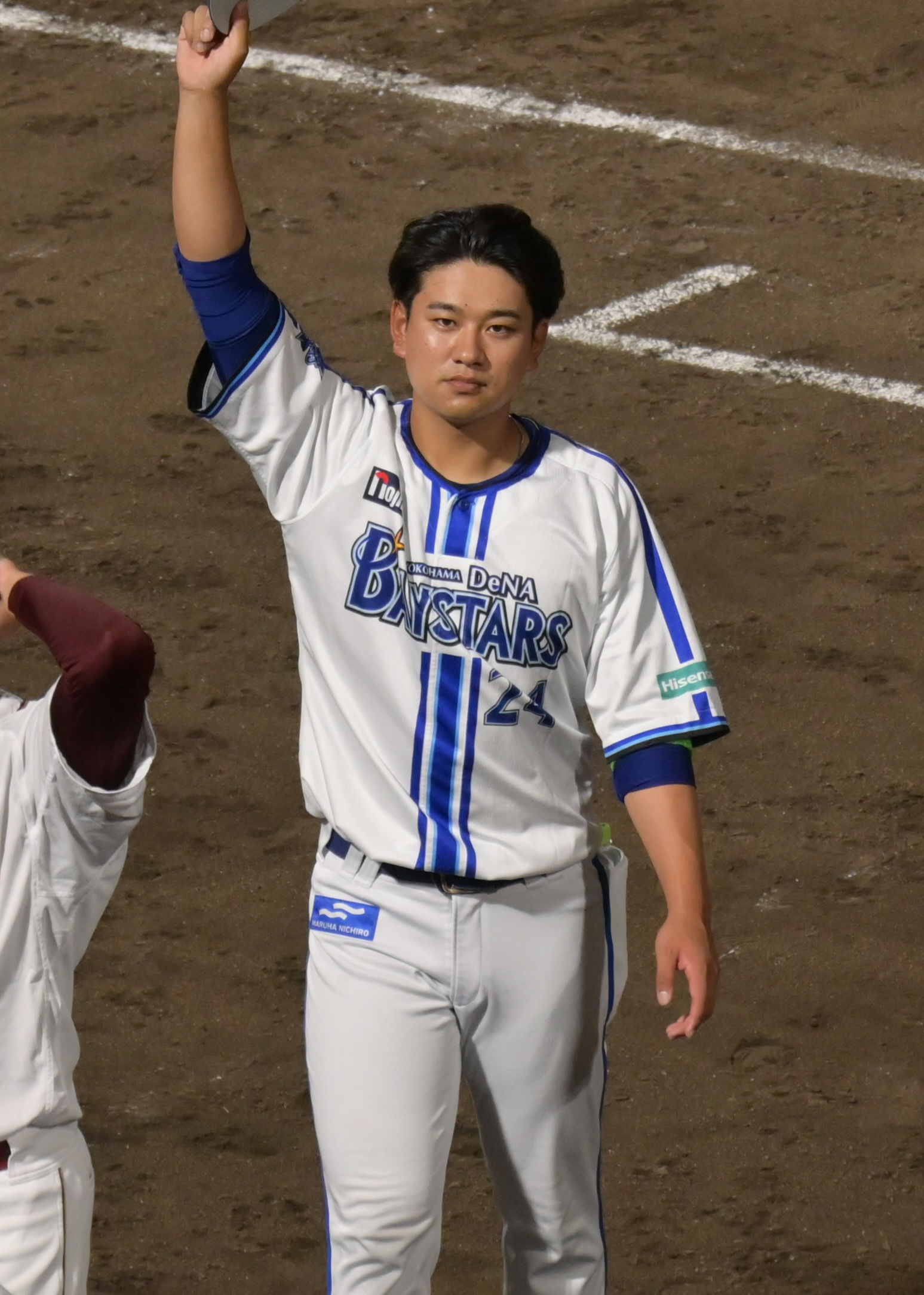
- Yoshino with the Yokohama DeNA BayStars

Yokohama DeNA BayStars – No. 24
- Pitcher
- Born: July 19, 1998 (age 27); Kikuchi, Kumamoto, Japan
- Bats: Right Throws: Right

NPB debut
- July 13, 2024, for the Yokohama DeNA BayStars

Career statistics (through 2024 season)
- Win–loss record: 3–2
- Earned run average: 4.31
- Strikeouts: 29
- Saves: 0
- Holds: 0
- Stats at Baseball Reference

Teams
- Yokohama DeNA BayStars (2023–present)

Career highlights and awards
- Japan Series champion (2024)

Teruki Yoshino (吉野 光樹, Yoshino Teruki; born July 19, 1998) is a professional Japanese baseball player. He is a pitcher for the Yokohama DeNA BayStars of Nippon Professional Baseball (NPB).
