= Takuma Hayashi =

Japanese baseball player (born 2000)

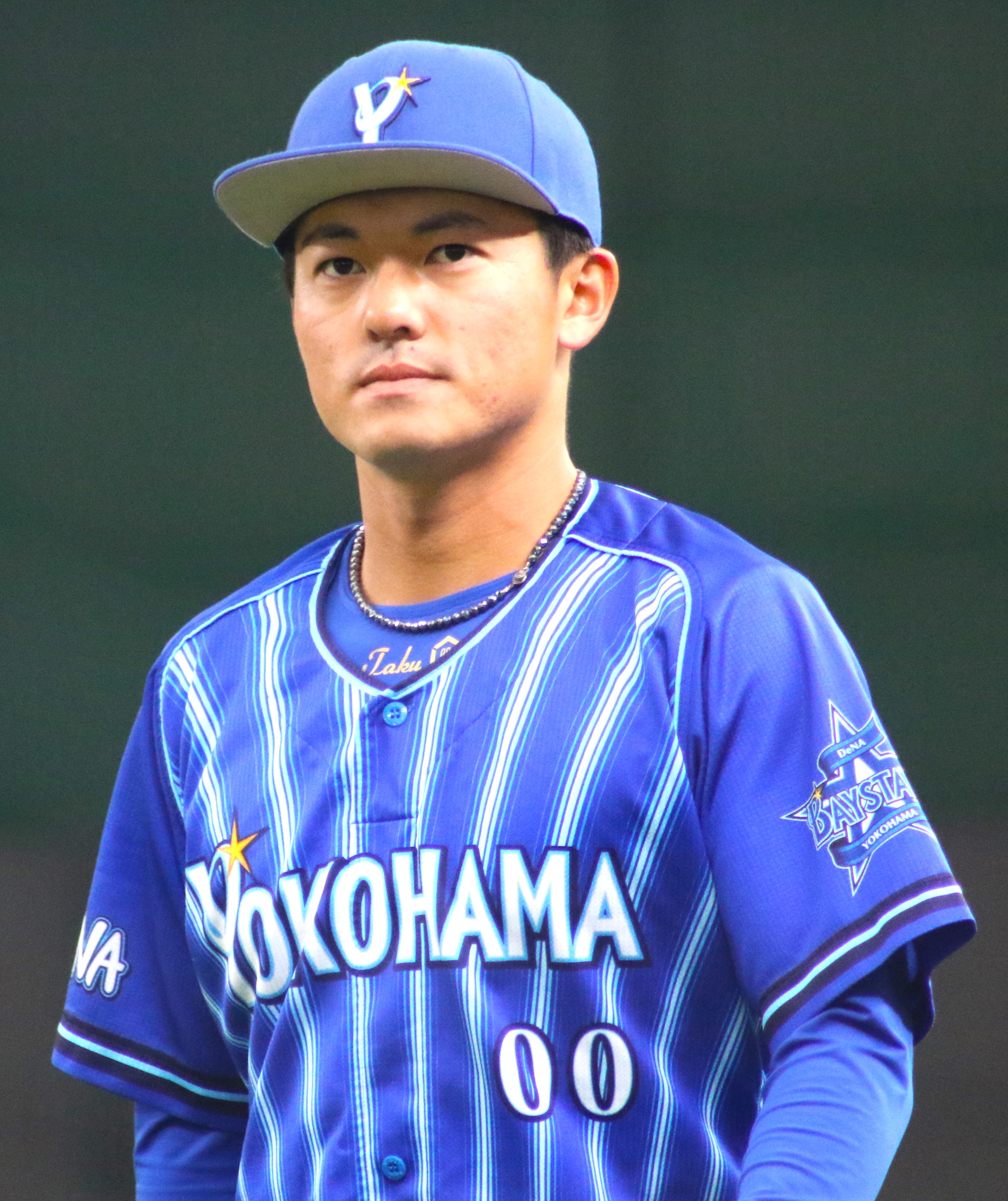
- Hayashi with the Yokohama DeNA BayStars

Yokohama DeNA BayStars – No. 00
- Infielder
- Born: August 24, 2000 (age 26); Aichi District, Aichi, Japan
- Bats: Left Throws: Right

NPB debut
- March 31, 2023, for the Yokohama DeNA BayStars

Career statistics (through 2025 season)
- Batting average: .218
- Home runs: 2
- Runs batted in: 38
- Stolen bases: 24

Teams
- Yokohama DeNA BayStars (2023–present)

Career highlights and awards
- Japan Series champion (2024)

Takuma Hayashi (林 琢真, Hayashi Takuma; born August 24, 2000) is a Japanese professional baseball player. He plays infielder for the Yokohama DeNA BayStars.
