= Yutaro Ishida =

Japanese baseball player (born 2002)

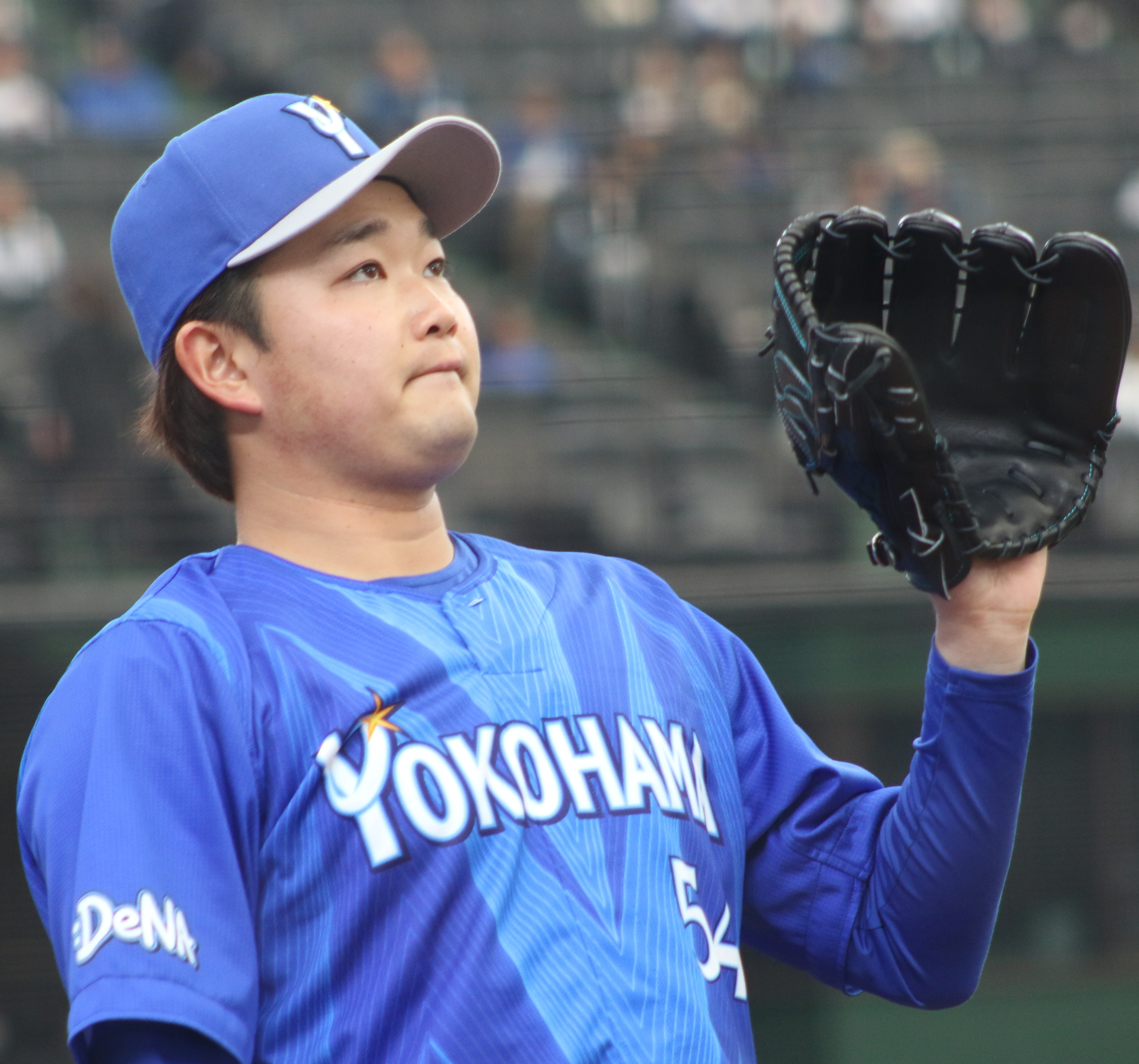

Yokohama DeNA BayStars – No. 54
- Pitcher
- Born: January 22, 2002 (age 24); Yokohama, Kanagawa, Japan
- Bats: Right Throws: Right

NPB debut
- June 9, 2024, for the Yokohama DeNA BayStars

Career statistics (through 2025 season)
- Win–loss record: 7–8
- Earned run average: 3.73
- Strikeouts: 133
- Saves: 0
- Holds: 1

Teams
- Yokohama DeNA BayStars (2024–present)

Career highlights and awards
- Japan Series champion (2024)

Yutaro Ishida (石田 裕太郎, Ishida Yutaro; born January 22, 2002) is a professional Japanese baseball player. He is a pitcher for the Yokohama DeNA BayStars of Nippon Professional Baseball (NPB).
