= Asahi Miyashita =

Japanese baseball player (born 2004)

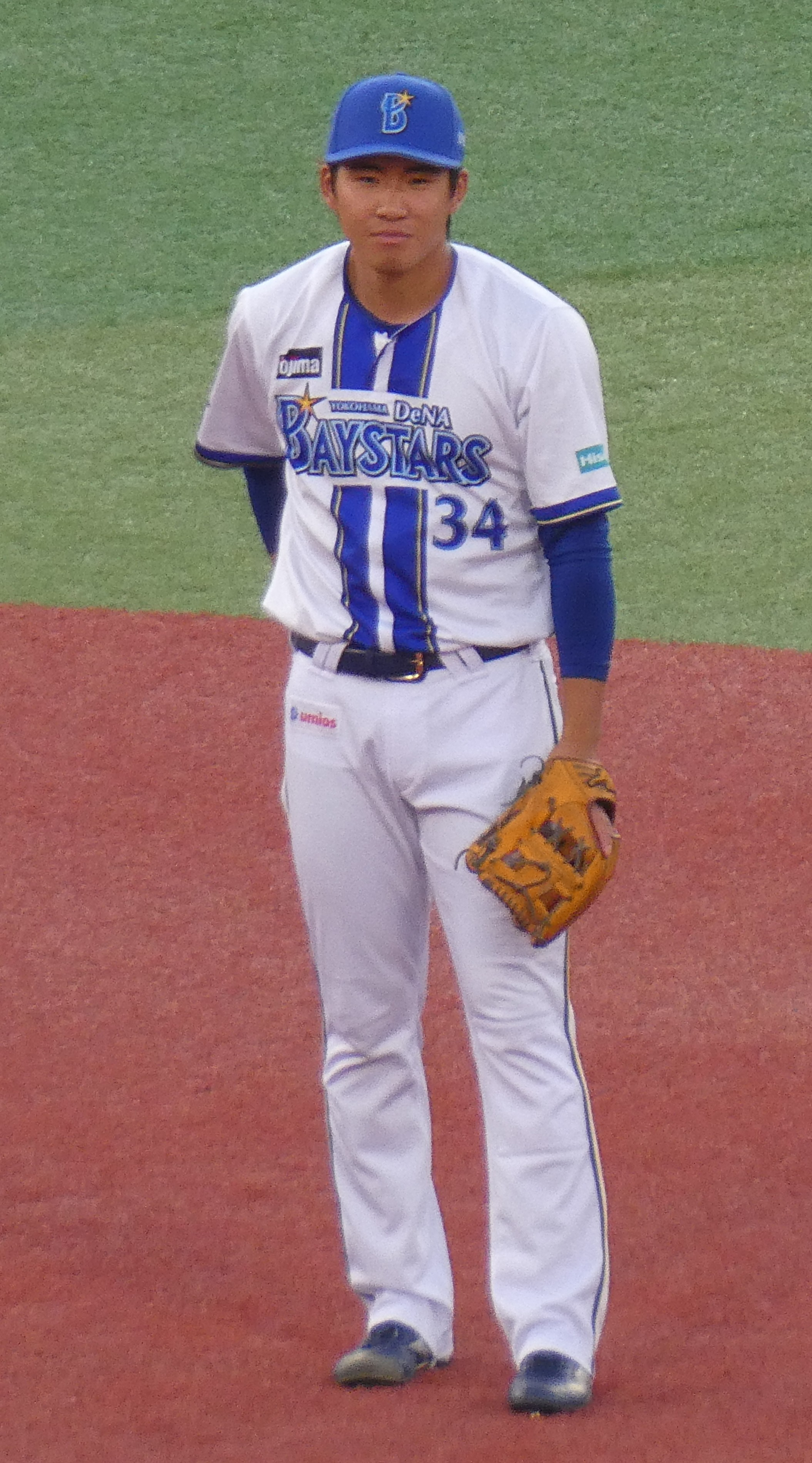
- Miyashita in 2026

Yokohama DeNA BayStars – No. 34
- Infielder
- Born: January 26, 2004 (age 22); Kuromatsunai, Hokkaido, Japan
- Bats: Right Throws: Right

NPB debut
- April 11, 2026, for the Yokohama DeNA BayStars

Career statistics (through August 1, 2026)
- Batting average: .244
- Home runs: 4
- RBI: 16

Teams
- Yokohama DeNA BayStars (2026-present)

Asahi Miyashita (宮下 朝陽, Miyashita Asahi; born January 26, 2004 in Kuromatsunai, Hokkaido, Japan) is a professional Japanese baseball player. He is an infielder for the Yokohama DeNA BayStars of Nippon Professional Baseball (NPB).
