= Takashi Manei =

Japanese baseball player and coach (born 1972)

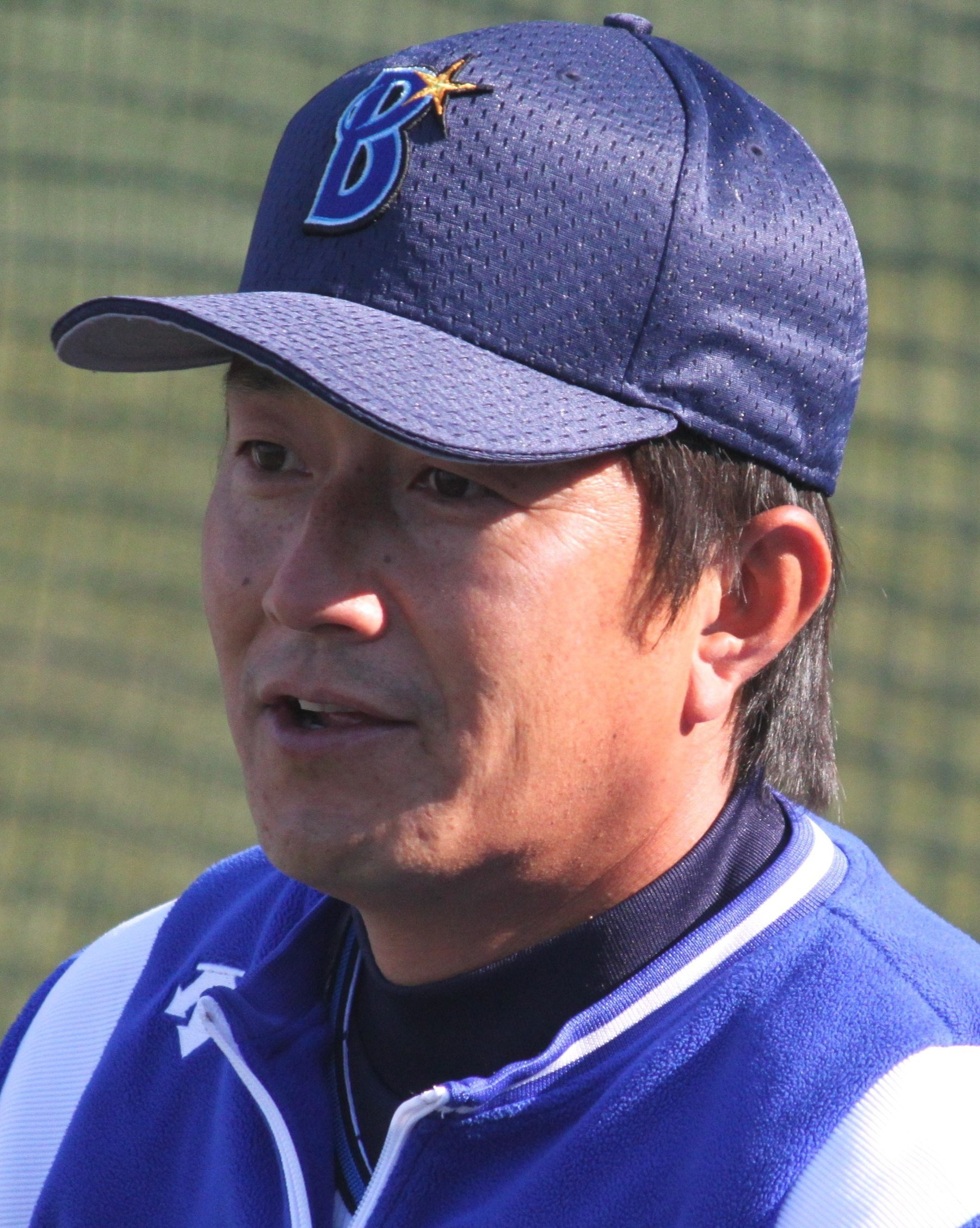

Yokohama DeNA BayStars – No. 82
- Infielder / Coach
- Born: July 7, 1972 (age 54); Himeji, Hyōgo, Japan
- Batted: Right Threw: Right

NPB debut
- October 9, 1994, for the Yokohama BayStars

Last appearance
- October 9, 2006, for the Yokohama BayStars

NPB statistics (through 2012)
- Batting average: .236
- Hits: 115
- Home runs: 5
- Runs batted in: 35
- Stolen base: 15
- Stats at Baseball Reference

Teams
- As player: Yokohama BayStars (1994–2006); As coach: Yokohama BayStars / Yokohama DeNA BayStars (2007–2009, 2013–present)

Takashi Manei (万永 貴司, Manei Takashi; born July 7, 1972 in Himeji, Hyōgo, Japan) is a Japanese former Nippon Professional Baseball infielder.
