= Ken Katoh =

Japanese baseball player (born 1981)

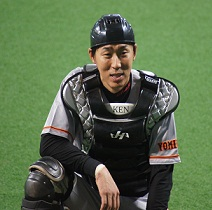
- Katoh with the Yomiuri Giants

Yokohama DeNA BayStars – No. 71
- Catcher / Coach
- Born: March 23, 1981 (age 44); Niigata, Japan
- Batted: Right Threw: Right

NPB debut
- September 27, 2000, for the Yomiuri Giants

Last NPB appearance
- July 3, 2016, for the Yomiuri Giants

NPB statistics
- Batting average: .216
- Hits: 59
- RBIs: 24
- Stats at Baseball Reference

Teams
- As player: Yomiuri Giants (2000, 2002–2016); As coach: Niigata Albirex Baseball Club (2019); Yomiuri Giants (2020–2025); Yokohama DeNA BayStars (2026–present)
- Last updated on: 25 December 2025

Ken Katoh (加藤 健, Katoh Ken; born March 23, 1981) is a Nippon Professional Baseball player for the Yomiuri Giants in Japan's Central League.

When he played in Nippon Series on November 1, 2012, Kazuhito Tadano was thrown out of the game because Koichi Yanada, the umpire-in-chief in the game, judged that Tadano threw a bean ball to his face. However, replays showed that the ball did not hit his face.
