= Shuto Ogata =

Japanese baseball player (born 1999)

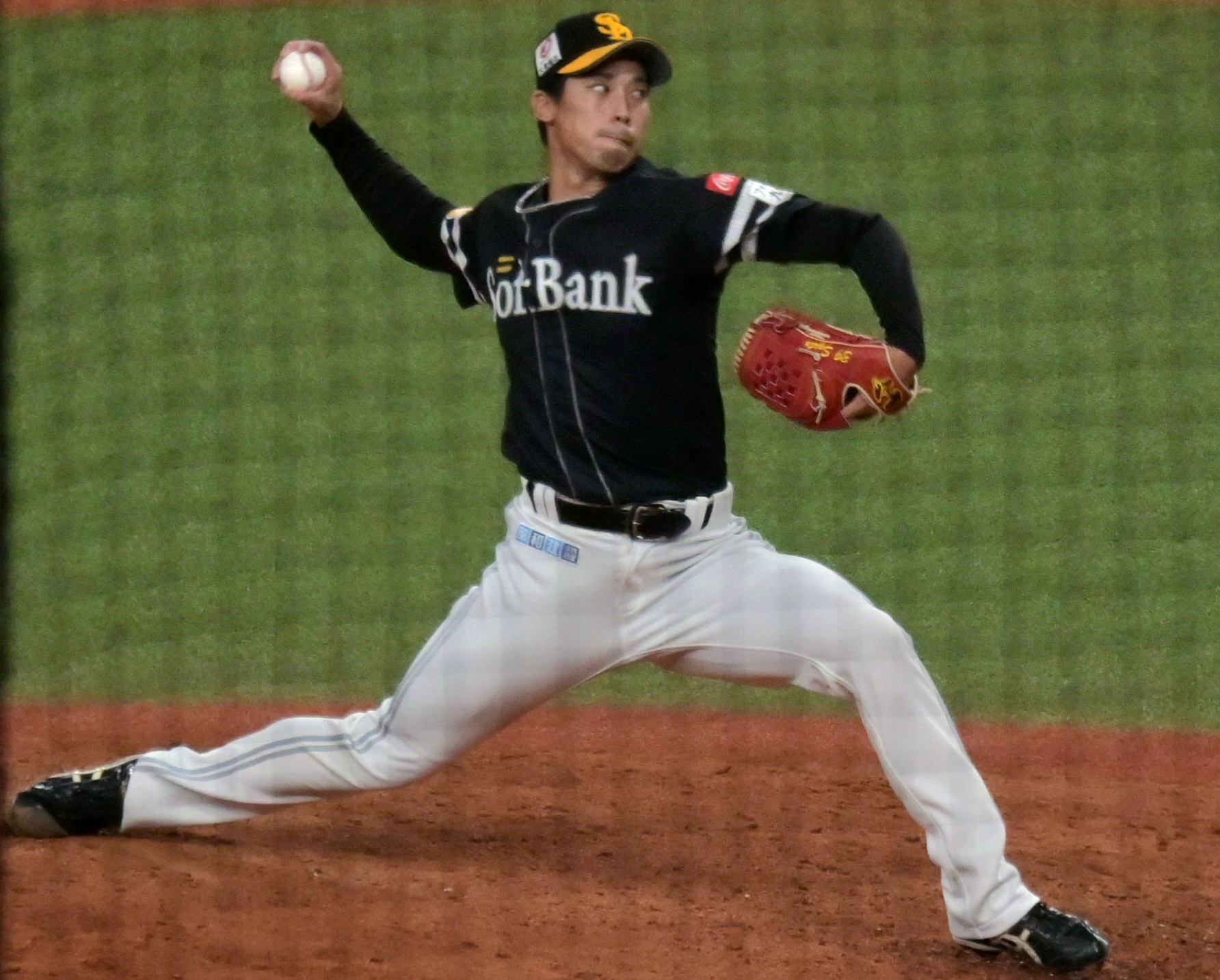

Yokohama DeNA BayStars – No. 36
- Pitcher
- Born: May 15, 1999 (age 27); Tomiya, Miyagi, Japan
- Bats: Left Throws: Right

NPB debut
- June 23, 2020, for the Fukuoka SoftBank Hawks

NPB statistics (through 2024 season)
- Win–loss record: 3-1
- ERA: 3.78
- Strikeouts: 52
- Stats at Baseball Reference

Teams
- Fukuoka SoftBank Hawks (2018–2026); Yokohama DeNA BayStars (2026–present)

Career highlights and awards
- Japan Series champion (2025); Western League saves leader (2023)

Shuto Ogata (尾形 崇斗, Ogata Shūto; born May 15, 1999 in Tomiya, Miyagi) is a Japanese professional baseball pitcher for the Yokohama DeNA BayStars of Nippon Professional Baseball.

== Professional career ==
On October 26, 2017, Ogata was drafted as a developmental player by the Fukuoka Softbank Hawks in the 2017 Nippon Professional Baseball draft.

From 2018 to 2019 season, he played in informal matches against the Shikoku Island League Plus's teams and amateur baseball teams, and played in the Western League of NPB second league.

On March 16, 2020, Ogata signed a 6 million yen contract yen with the Fukuoka SoftBank Hawks as a registered player under control.) On June 23, Ogata debuted in the Pacific League against the Saitama Seibu Lions as a relief pitcher. In 2020 season, he pitched only one game in the Pacific League.

In 2021 season, he finished the regular season with 8 Games pitched, a 0–0 Win–loss record, a 0.87 ERA, and a 9 strikeouts in 10.1 innings.

On April 5, 2022, Ogata scored his first win against the Orix Buffaloes as a relief pitcher. In 2022 season, he finished the regular season with 9 Games pitched, a 1–0 Win–loss record, a 5.56 ERA, and a 11 strikeouts in 11.1 innings.

In 2023 season, Ogata finished the regular season with a 12 Games pitched, a 0-1 Win–loss record, a 4.00 ERA, and a 15 strikeouts in 18 innings. And he made 16 saves in the Western League and won the Western League Save Leader Award.
