= Tatsuhiro Shibata =

Japanese baseball player (born 1993)

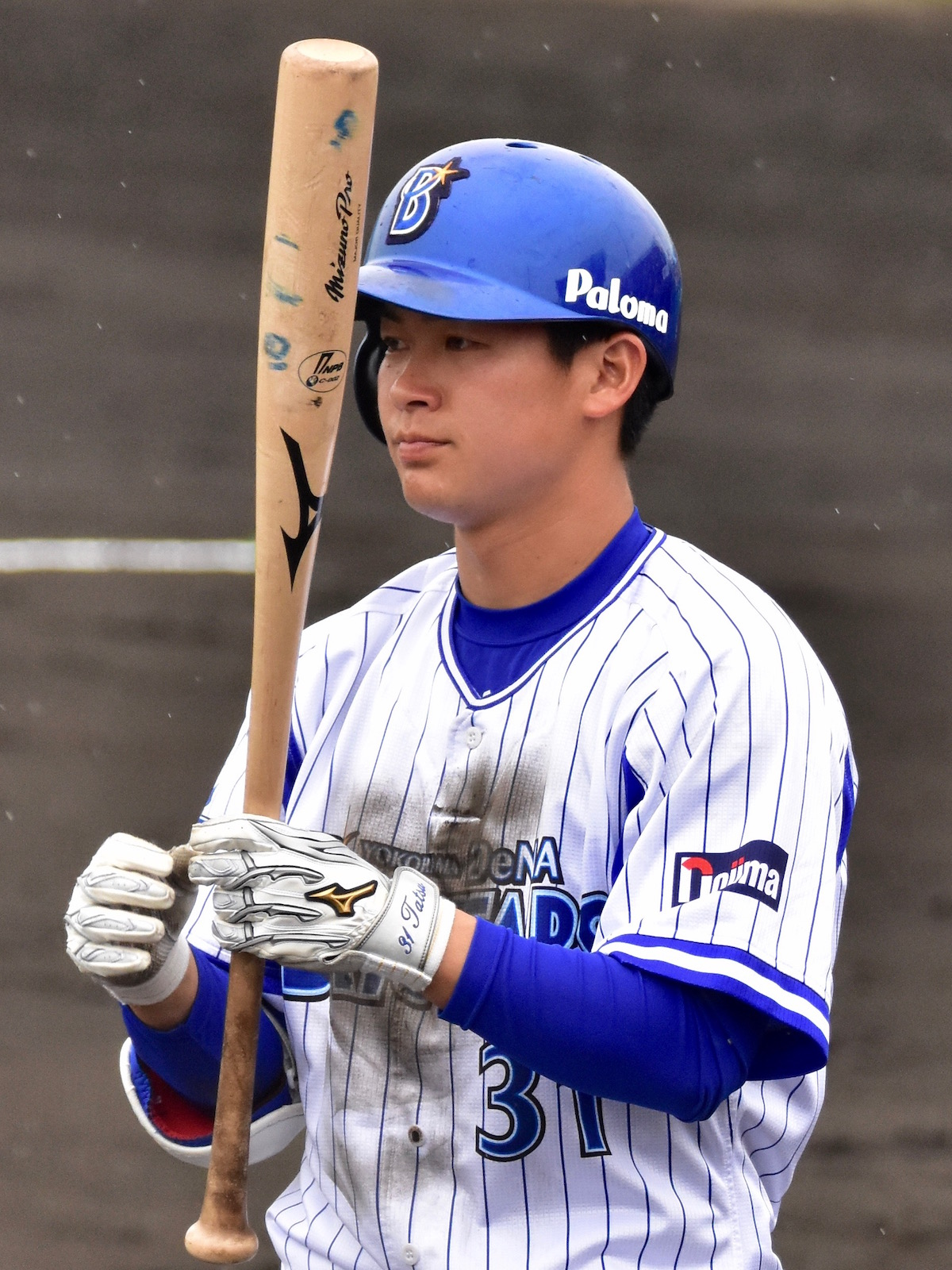
- Shibata with the Yokohama DeNA BayStars

Yokohama DeNA BayStars – No. 31
- Infielder
- Born: December 16, 1993 (age 32); Okayama, Okayama, Japan
- Bats: Right Throws: Right

NPB debut
- March 25, 2016, for the Yokohama DeNA BayStars

Career statistics (through 2023 season)
- Batting average: .230
- Hits: 303
- Home runs: 11
- Runs batted in: 81
- Stolen bases: 9
- Stats at Baseball Reference

Teams
- Yokohama DeNA BayStars (2016–present)

Career highlights and awards
- Japan Series champion (2024)

Tatsuhiro Shibata (柴田 竜拓, Shibata Tatsuhiro; born December 16, 1993 in Okayama, Okayama, Japan) is a professional Japanese baseball player. He plays infielder for the Yokohama DeNA BayStars.
