= Hansel Marcelino =

Dominican baseball player (born 2002)

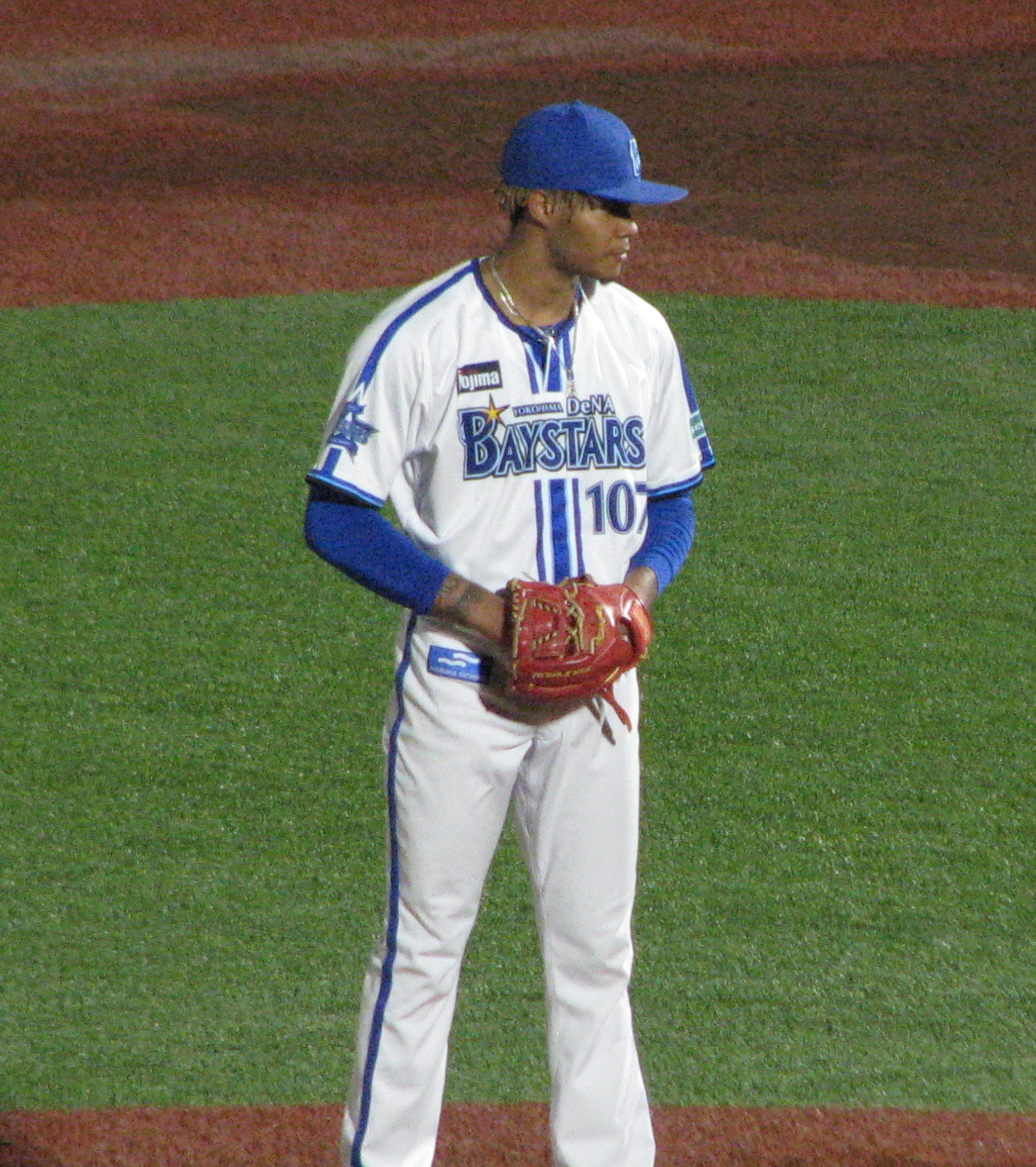
- Marcelino with the Yokohama DeNA BayStars

Yokohama DeNA BayStars – No. 98
- Pitcher
- Born: June 16, 2002 (age 24); Santiago de los Caballeros, Dominican Republic
- Bats: Right Throws: Right

NPB debut
- June 20, 2025, for the Yokohama DeNA BayStars

Career statistics (through August 18, 2026)
- Win-Loss: 1–1
- ERA: 5.46
- Strikeouts: 33

Teams
- Yokohama DeNA BayStars (2025–Present)

Hansel Marcelino (born June 16, 2002) is a professional Dominican baseball player. He pitches for the Yokohama DeNA BayStars.

== Career ==
=== St. Louis Cardinals ===
Marcelino began his career in 2019, signing with the St. Louis Cardinals on July 3 as an international free agent. He made 10 appearances for the Dominican Summer League Cardinals, recording a 5.25 ERA with 11 strikeouts. He did not appear in a game in 2020 due to the cancellation of the minor league baseball season due to the COVID-19 pandemic. Before appearing in another game, he was released on December 11.

=== Yokohama DeNA BayStars ===
Marcelino signed a developmental contract with the Yokohama DeNA BayStars on December 22, 2021.
