= Daita Miyagi =

Japanese baseball player (born 2000)

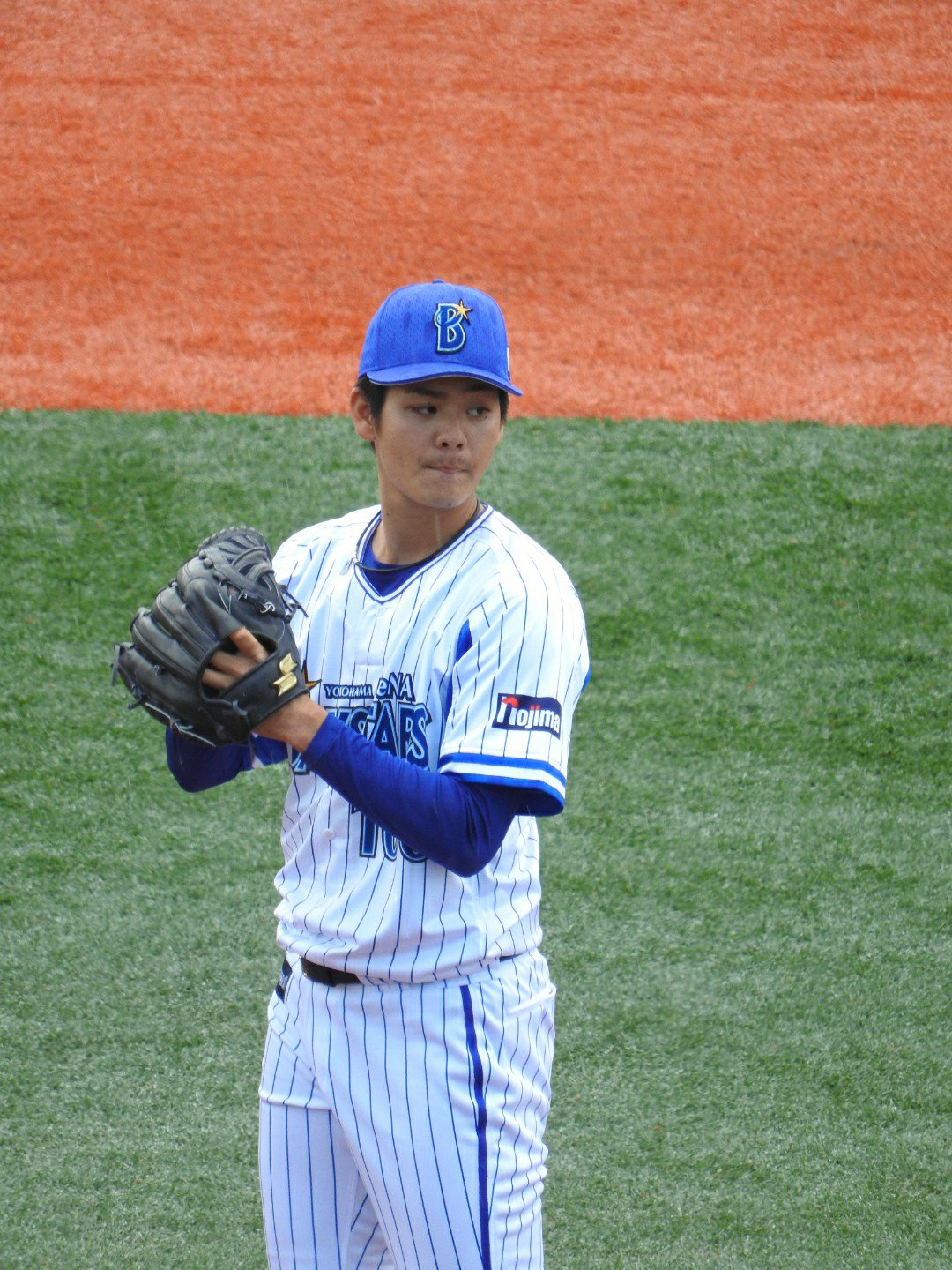
- Miyagi with the Yokohama DeNA BayStars in 2019

Yokohama DeNA BayStars – No. 65
- Pitcher
- Born: July 15, 2000 (age 26); Kadena, Okinawa , Japan
- Bats: Right Throws: Right

NPB debut
- April 13, 2023, for the Yokohama DeNA BayStars

Career statistics (through August 25, 2026)
- Win–loss record: 4–4
- Earned run average: 3.01
- Strikeouts: 92
- Saves: 0
- Holds: 22

Teams
- Yokohama DeNA BayStars (2019–present); Kanagawa Future Dreams (2020); Yaquis de Obregon (2023)

Daita Miyagi (宮城 滝太, Miyagi Takita; born July 15, 2000) is a Japanese professional baseball player. He is a pitcher for the Yokohama DeNA BayStars of Nippon Professional Baseball (NPB).

== Career ==
=== Yokohama DeNA BayStars ===
Miyagi was selected by Yokohama DeNA BayStars in the second round of the 2018 NPB draft. He made his Nippon Professional Baseball (NPB) debut on April 13, 2023.

=== Yaquis de Obregon ===
In 2023, Miyagi played seven games in the Mexican Pacific League, where he had a 7.94 ERA with eight strikeouts in 5 2/3 innings.
