= Koh Nakagawa =

Japanese baseball player (born 1999)

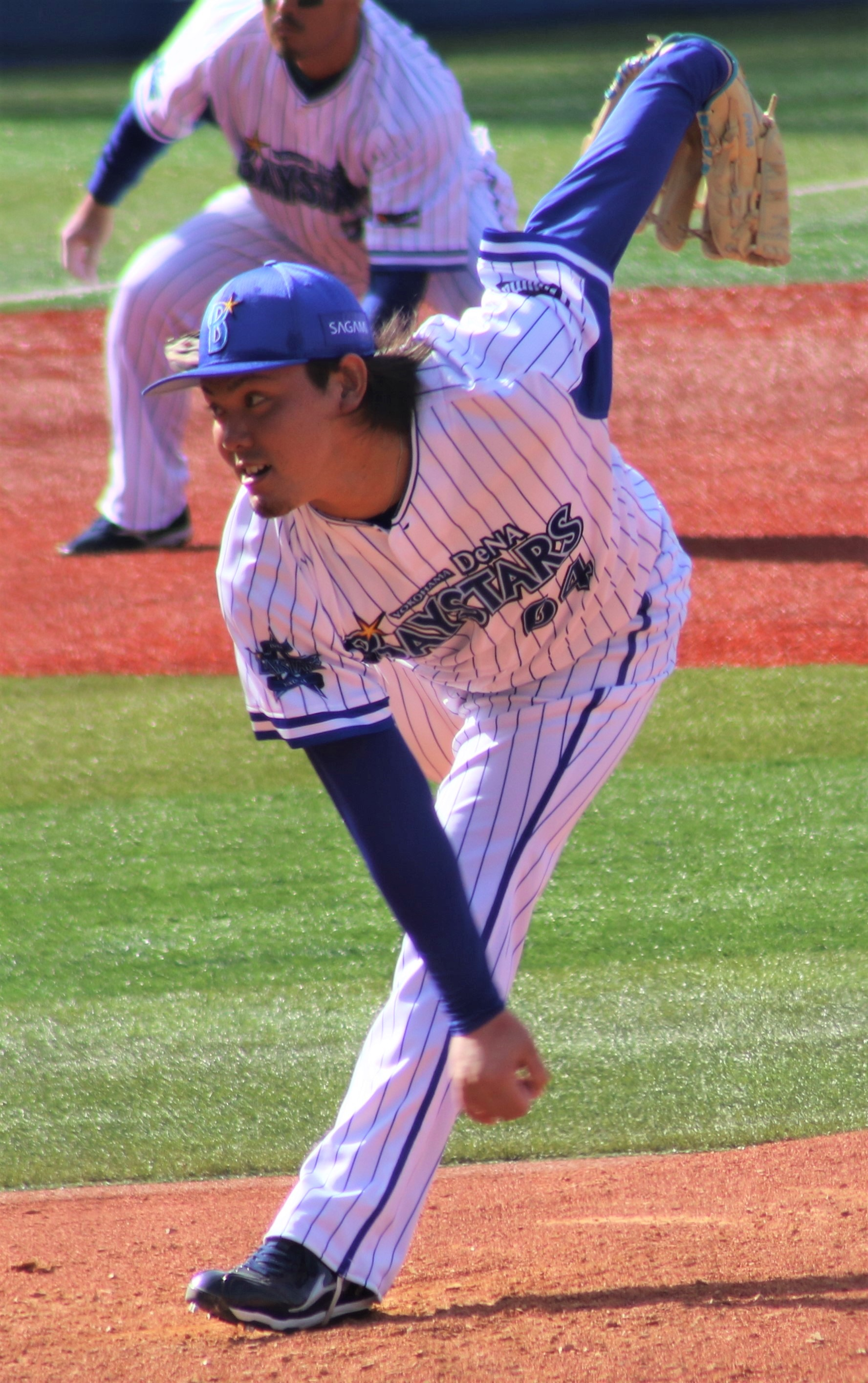
- Nakagawa with the Yokohama DeNA BayStars

Yokohama DeNA BayStars – No. 64
- Pitcher
- Born: October 2, 1999 (age 26); Wakayama, Wakayama, Japan
- Bats: Right Throws: Right

NPB debut
- July 28, 2019, for the Yokohama DeNA BayStars

Career statistics (through 2024 season)
- Win–loss record: 1–7
- Earned run average: 4.62
- Strikeouts: 81
- Saves: 0
- Holds: 10

Teams
- Yokohama DeNA BayStars (2018–present)

Career highlights and awards
- Japan Series champion (2024)

Koh Nakagawa (中川 虎大, Nakagawa Koh; born October 2, 1999) is a professional Japanese baseball player. He is a pitcher for the Yokohama DeNA BayStars of Nippon Professional Baseball (NPB).
