= Shinji Ohara =

Japanese baseball player

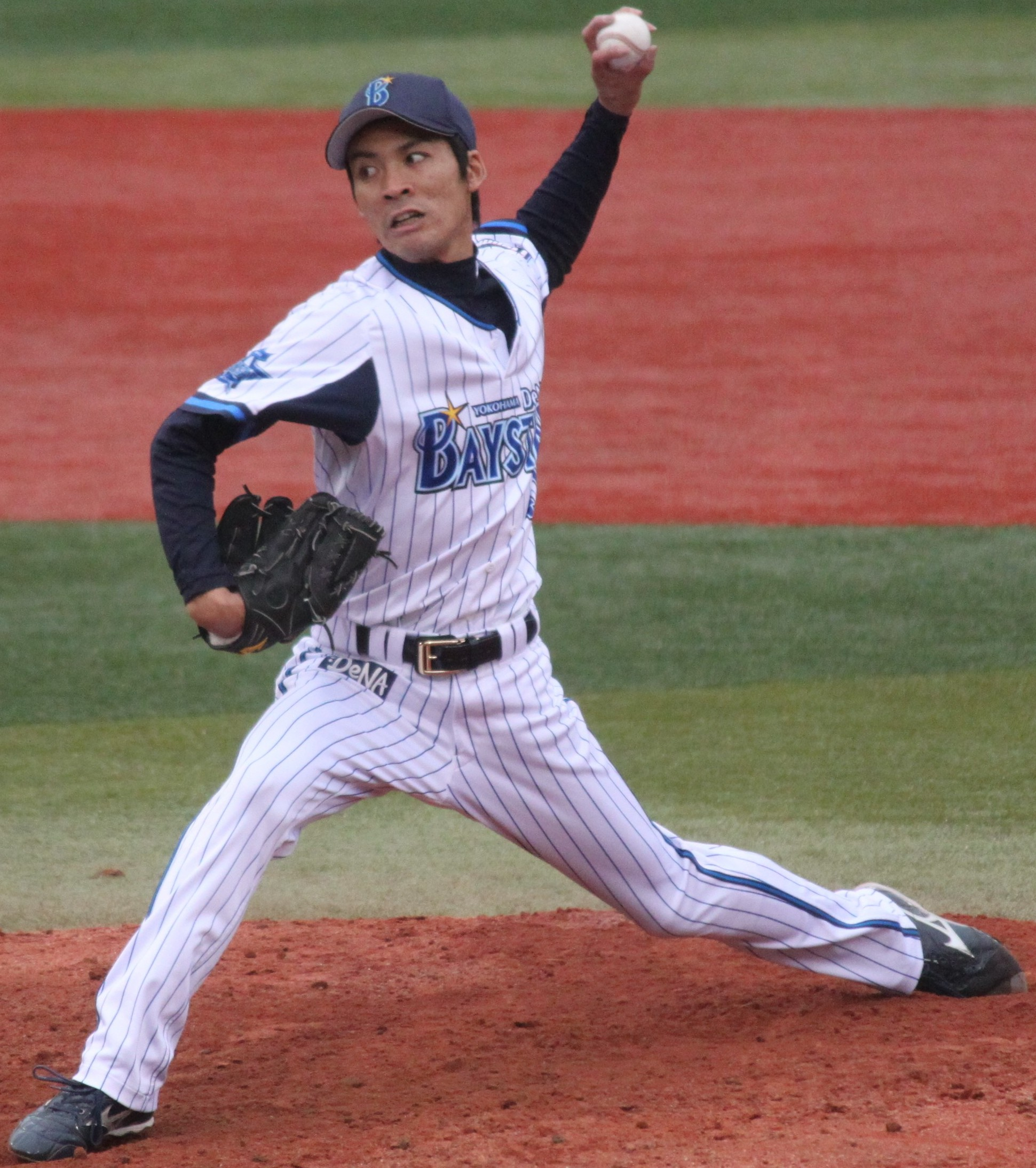
- Ohara with the Yokohama DeNA BayStars

Yokohama DeNA BayStars – No. 79
- Pitcher / Coach
- Born: June 30, 1985 (age 40); Hitachi, Ibaraki, Japan
- Bats: Left Throws: Left

debut
- April 30, 2011, for the Yokohama BayStars
- Stats at Baseball Reference

Teams
- As player: Yokohama BayStars/Yokohama DeNA BayStars (2011–2017); As coach: Yokohama DeNA BayStars (2023–present)

Shinji Ohara (大原 慎司, Ohara Shinji; born July 30, 1985 in Hitachi, Ibaraki, Japan) is a professional Japanese baseball player. He plays pitcher for the Yokohama DeNA BayStars.
