= Keito Mori =

Japanese baseball player (born 2002)

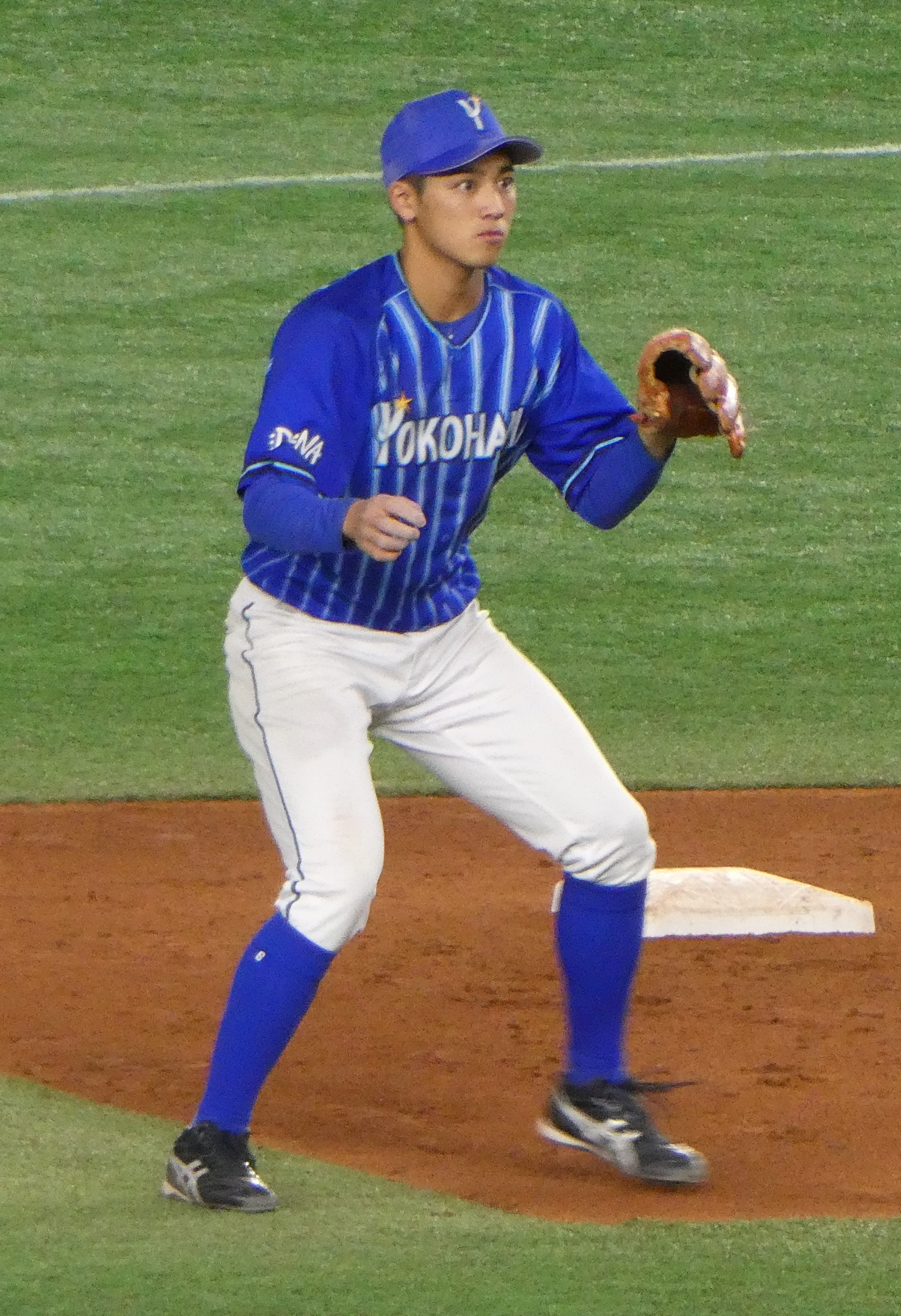

Yokohama DeNA BayStars – No. 6
- Infielder
- Born: January 28, 2002 (age 24); Shizuoka, Shizuoka, Japan
- Bats: Left Throws: Right

NPB debut
- October 27, 2020, for the Yokohama DeNA BayStars

Career statistics (through 2024 season)
- Batting average: .231
- Hits: 108
- Home runs: 2
- RBIs: 17
- Stolen bases: 18
- Stats at Baseball Reference

Teams
- Yokohama DeNA BayStars (2020–present)

Career highlights and awards
- Japan Series champion (2024)

Keito Mori (森 敬斗, Mori Keito; born January 28, 2002) is a professional Japanese baseball player. He plays infielder for the Yokohama DeNA BayStars.
