= Tatsuo Ebina =

Japanese baseball player (born 1997)

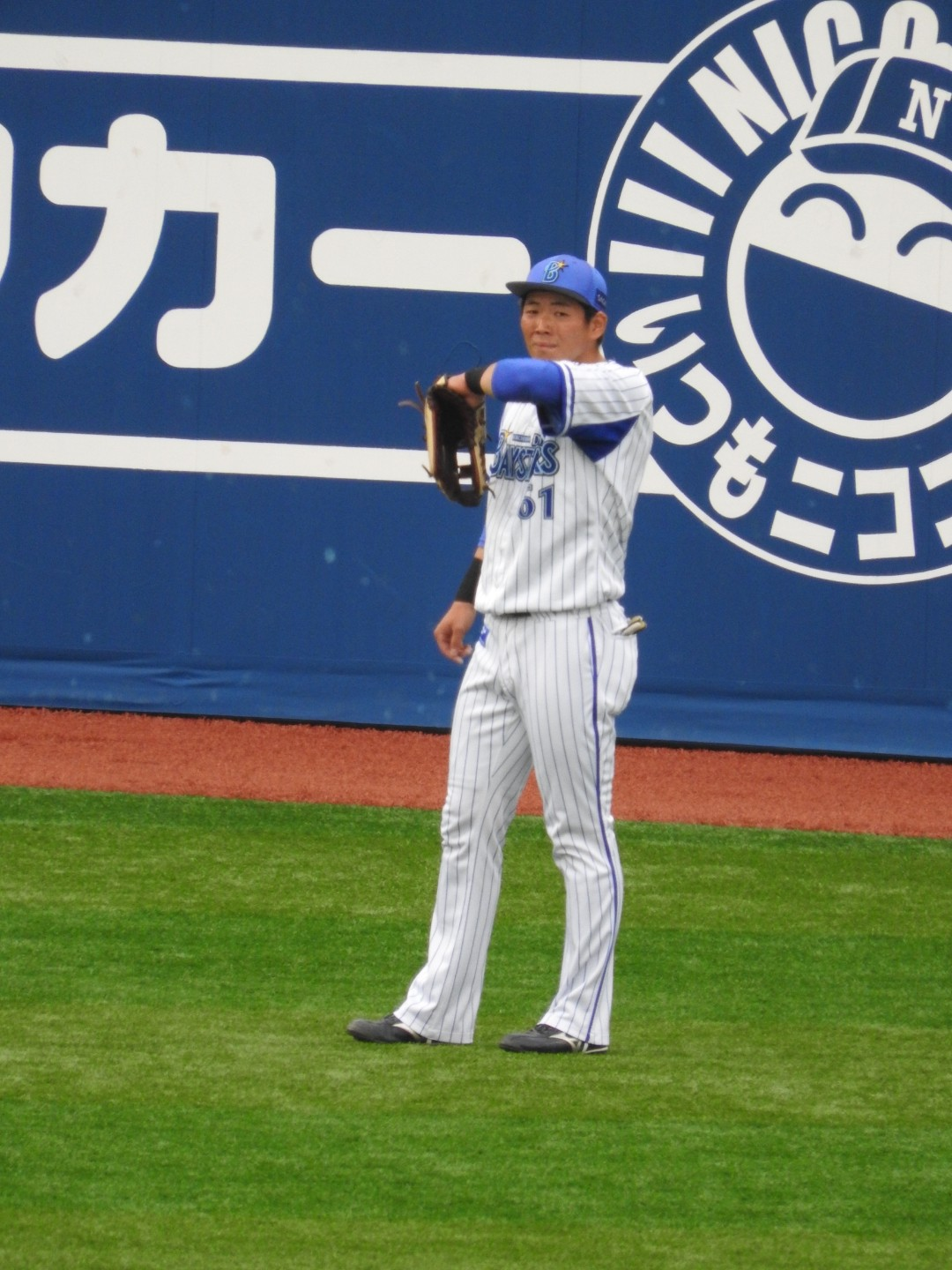
- Ebina with the Yokohama DeNA BayStars

Yokohama DeNA BayStars – No. 61
- Outfielder
- Born: September 20, 1997 (age 29); Aomori, Aomori, Japan
- Bats: Right Throws: Right

NPB debut
- June 24, 2020, for the Yokohama DeNA BayStars

Career statistics (through 2025 season)
- Batting average: .255
- Hits: 207
- Home runs: 15
- RBI: 68

Teams
- Yokohama DeNA BayStars (2020–present)

Career highlights and awards
- Japan Series champion (2024)

Tatsuo Ebina (蝦名 達夫, Ebina Tatsuo; born September 20, 1997 in Aomori, Aomori, Japan) is a Japanese professional baseball outfielder for the Yokohama DeNA BayStars of Nippon Professional Baseball (NPB).
