= Kazuki Kamizato =

Japanese baseball player (born 1994)

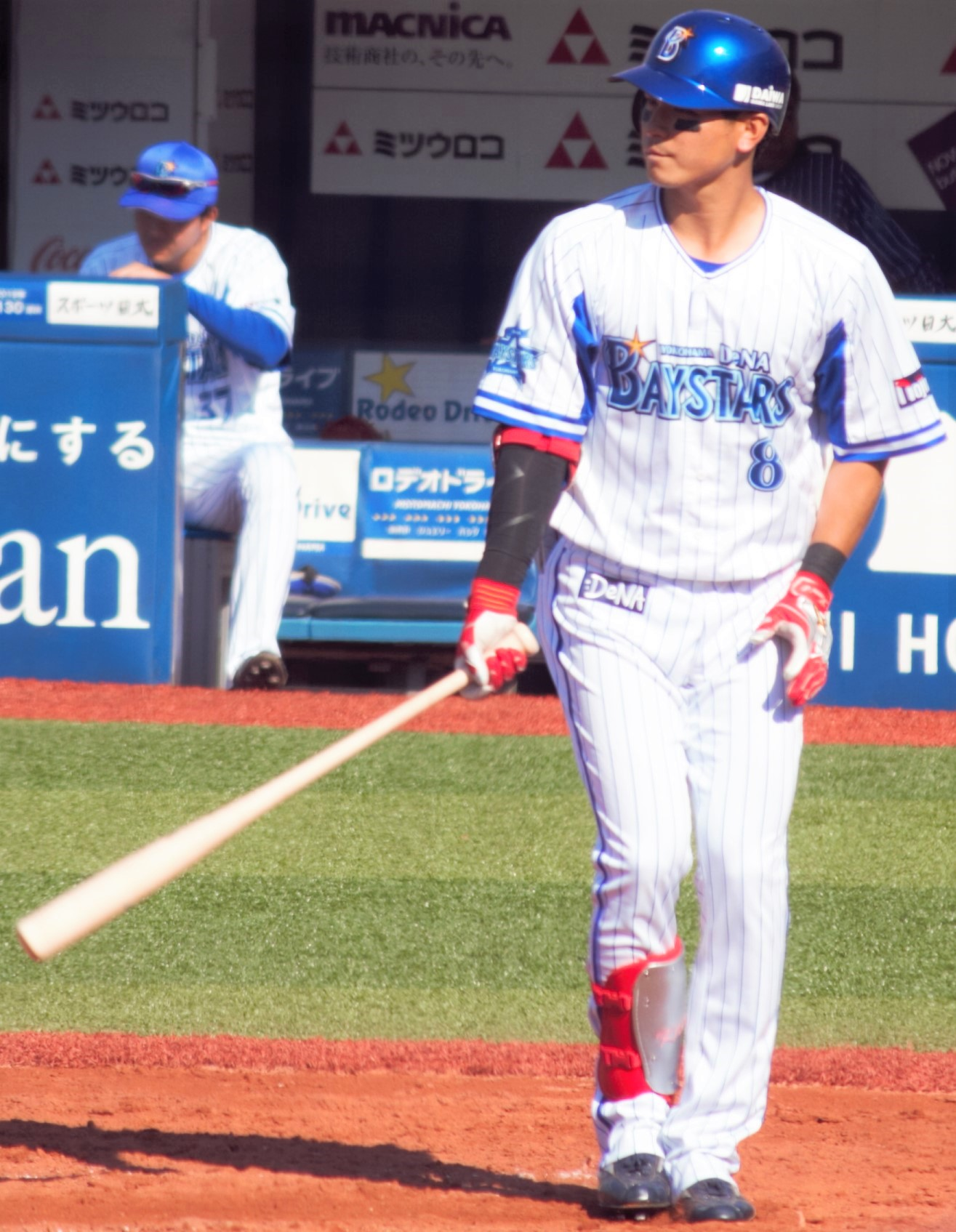
- Kamizato with the Yokohama DeNA BayStars

Yokohama DeNA BayStars – No. 8
- Outfielder
- Born: January 17, 1994 (age 32); Shimajiri District, Okinawa, Japan
- Bats: Left Throws: Right

NPB debut
- March 30, 2018, for the Yokohama DeNA BayStars

NPB statistics (through 2024 season)
- Batting average: .253
- Hits: 283
- Home runs: 19
- RBI: 101
- Stats at Baseball Reference

Teams
- Yokohama DeNA BayStars (2018–present)

Career highlights and awards
- Japan Series champion (2024); NPB All-Star (2019)

Kazuki Kamizato (神里 和毅, Kamizato Kazuki; born January 17, 1994) is a professional Japanese baseball player. He plays outfielder for the Yokohama DeNA BayStars.
