= Hayate Nakagawa =

Japanese baseball player (born 1998)

Hayate Hayate Nakagawa
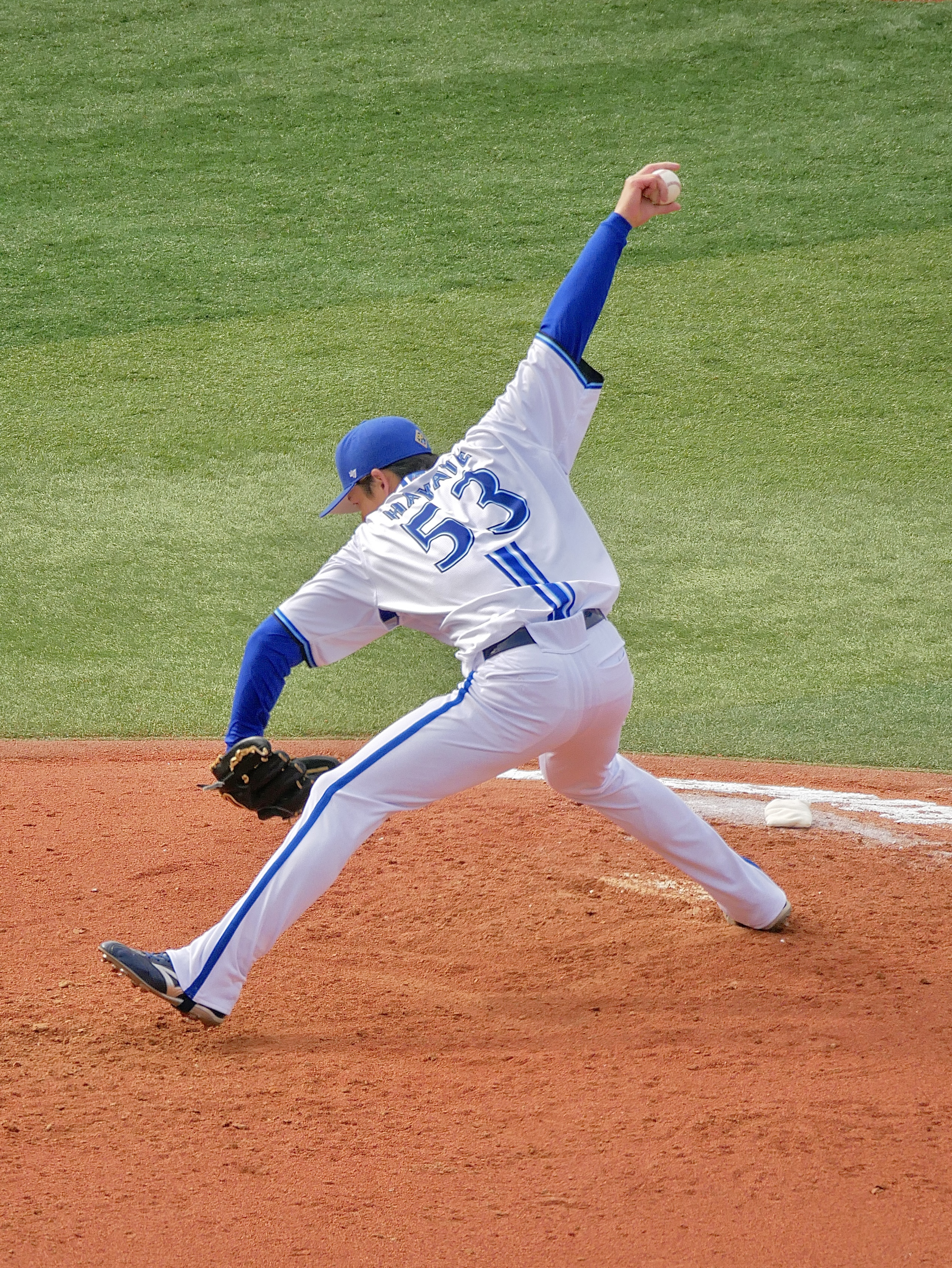
- Hayate with the Yokohama DeNA BayStars in 2024

Yokohama DeNA BayStars – No. 53
- Pitcher
- Born: October 10, 1998 (age 27); Yokohama, Kanagawa, Japan
- Bats: Left Throws: Right

NPB debut
- July 14, 2021, for the Orix Buffaloes

Career statistics (through 2025 season)
- Win–loss record: 3–1
- Earned run average: 3.65
- Strikeouts: 52
- Saves: 1
- Holds: 7

Teams
- Orix Buffaloes (2020–2023); Yokohama DeNA BayStars (2024–present)

Career highlights and awards
- Japan Series champion (2024)

Hayate Nakagawa (中川 颯, Nakagawa Hayate; born October 10, 1998) also known as Hayate (颯) is a professional Japanese baseball player. He is a pitcher for the Yokohama DeNA BayStars of Nippon Professional Baseball (NPB). He has previously played in NPB for the Orix Buffaloes.

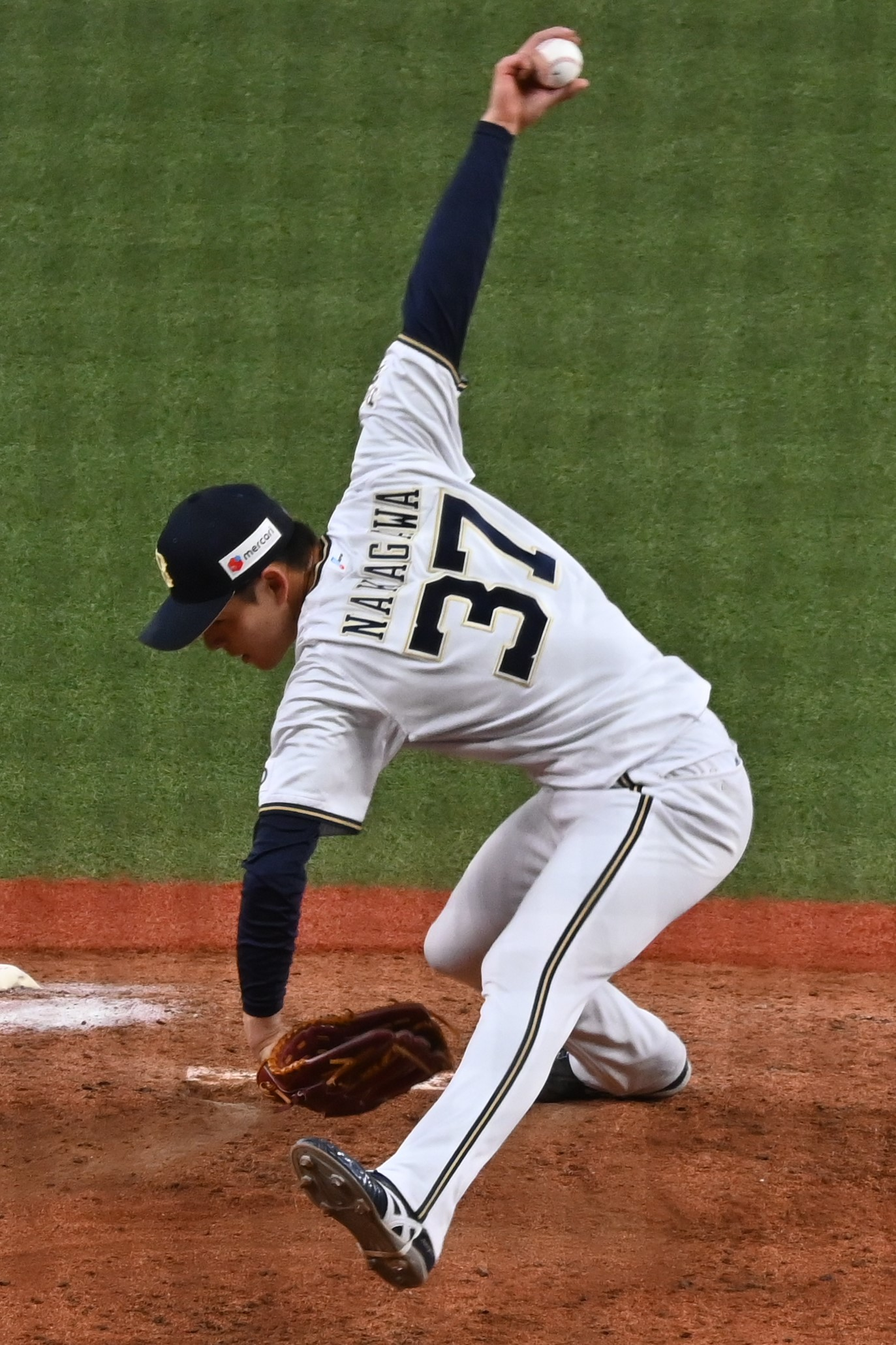
Hayate with the Orix Buffaloes in 2021
