= Iwao Ohmura =

Japanese baseball player and coach (born 1969)

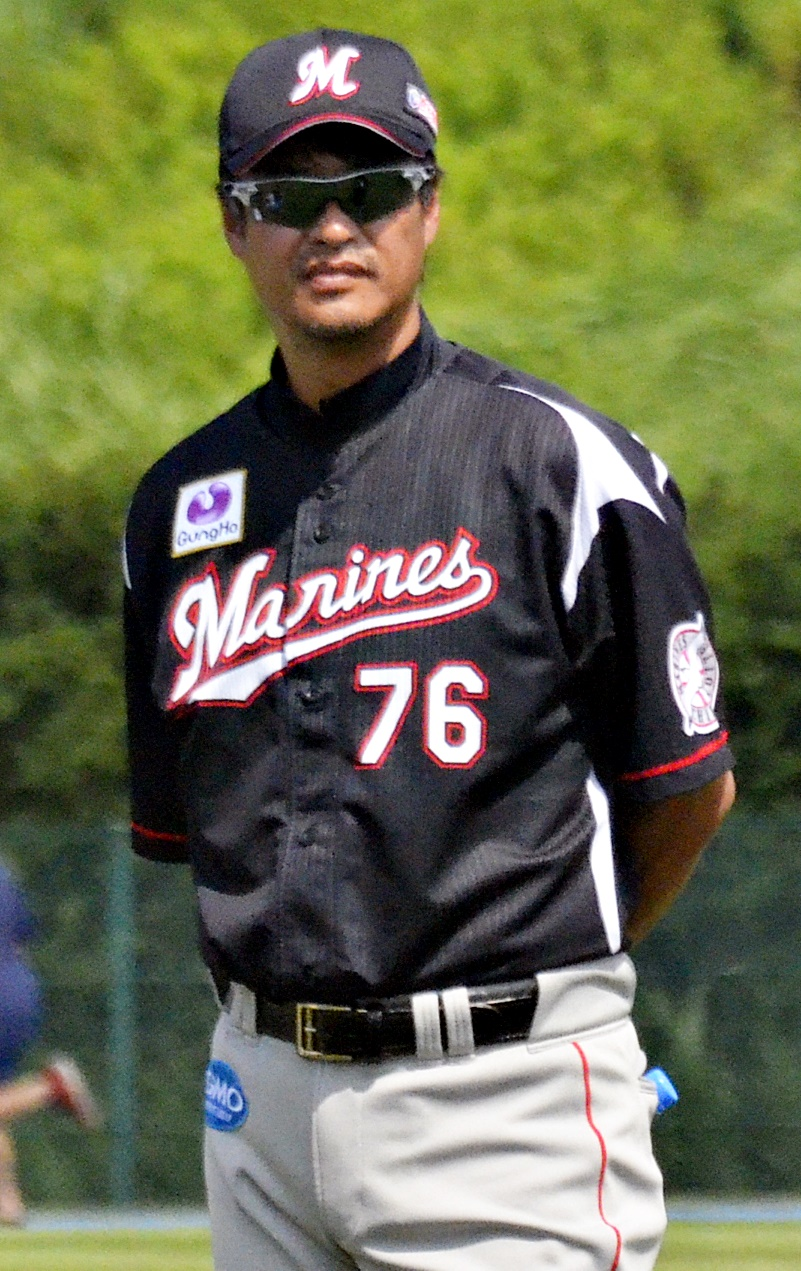

Yokohama DeNA BayStars – No. 90
- Outfielder / Coach
- Born: May 31, 1969 (age 57); Wakkanai, Hokkaido, Japan
- Batted: Right Threw: Right

NPB debut
- September 30, 1992, for the Chiba Lotte Marines

Last NPB appearance
- August 25, 2002, for the Chiba Lotte Marines

NPB statistics (through 2003 season)
- Batting average: .268
- Hits: 310
- RBIs: 174
- Stolen bases: 3
- Stats at Baseball Reference

Teams
- As player: Lotte Orions/Chiba Lotte Marines (1988–2002); As coach: Hokkaido Nippon-Ham Fighters (2006–2012); Yokohama DeNA BayStars (2013–2015, 2020–present); Chiba Lotte Marines (2016–2019)

Iwao Ohmura (大村 巌, Ohmura Iwao; born May 31, 1969), nicknamed "Fisherman", is a former Nippon Professional Baseball outfielder and the current coach of the Yokohama DeNA BayStars.
