= Kōki Kajiwara =

Japanese baseball player (born 1999)

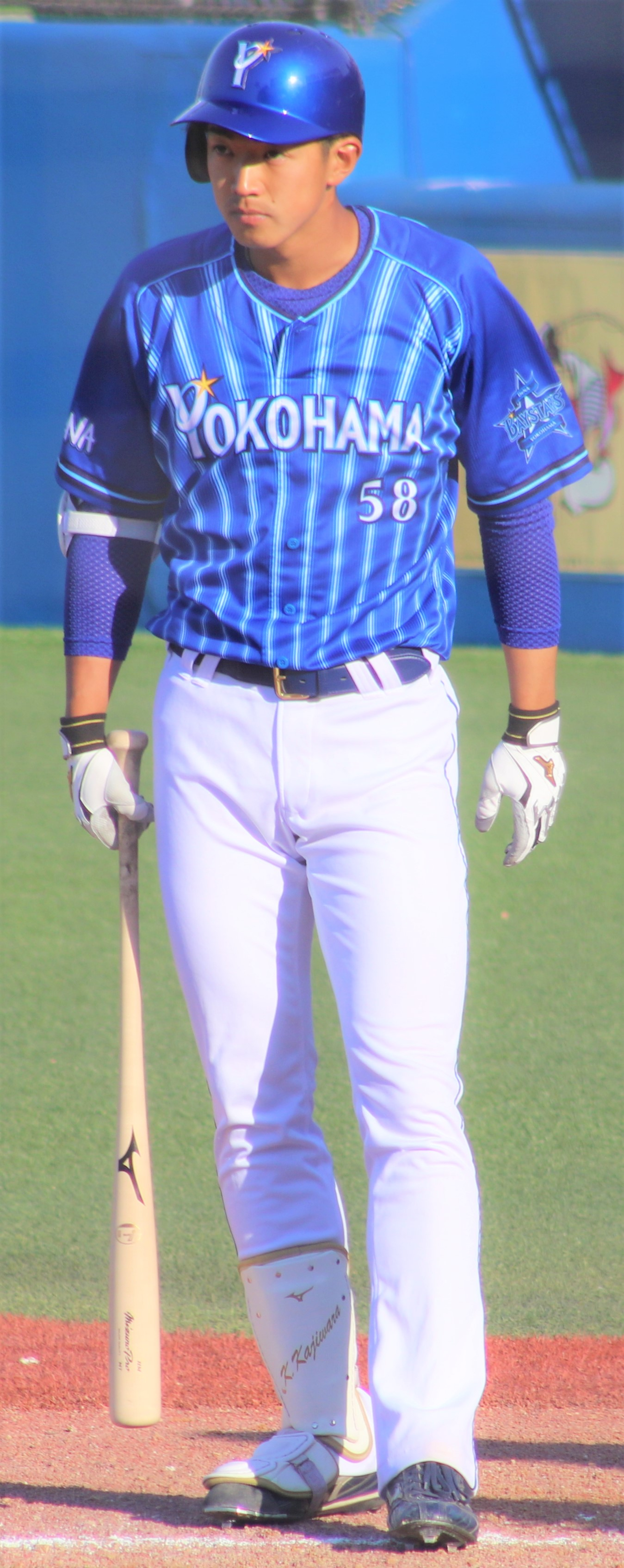
- Kajiwara with the Yokohama DeNA BayStars

Yokohama DeNA BayStars – No. 58
- Outfielder
- Born: September 19, 1999 (age 26); Ōita, Ōita, Japan
- Bats: Left Throws: Right

NPB debut
- April 12, 2022, for the Yokohama DeNA BayStars

NPB statistics (through 2024 season)
- Batting average: .283
- Hits: 115
- Home runs: 5
- RBI: 34
- Stolen bases: 17

Teams
- Yokohama DeNA BayStars (2022–present)

Career highlights and awards
- Japan Series champion (2024)

Kōki Kajiwara (梶原 昂希, Kajiwara Kōki; born September 19, 1999) is a Japanese professional baseball player. He plays outfielder for the Yokohama DeNA BayStars.
