= Taisei Irie =

Japanese baseball player (born 1998)

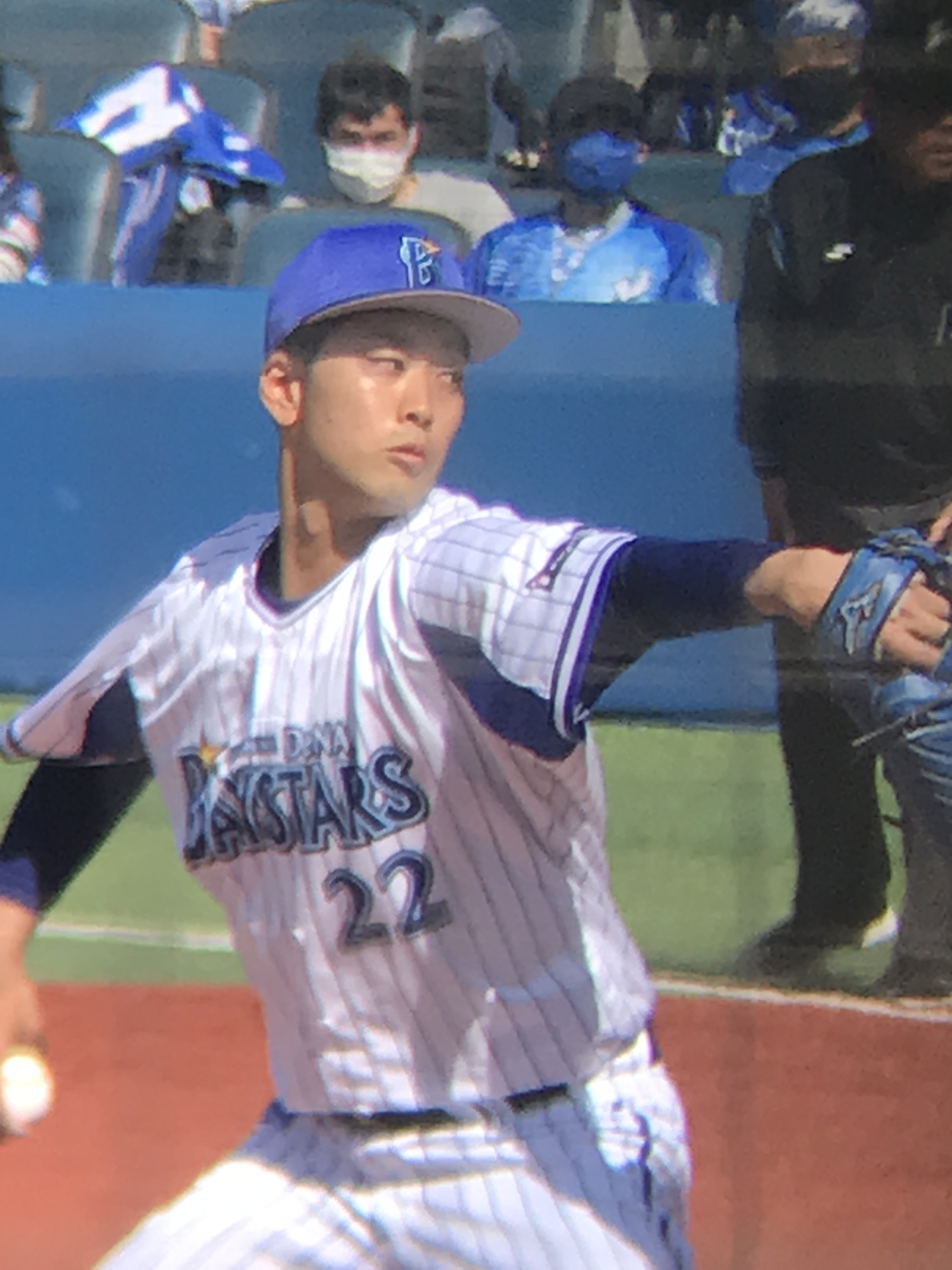

Yokohama DeNA BayStars – No. 22
- Pitcher
- Born: August 26, 1998 (age 27); Nikkō, Tochigi, Japan
- Bats: Right Throws: Right

NPB debut
- March 31, 2021, for the Yokohama DeNA BayStars

NPB statistics (through 2025 season)
- Win–loss record: 9–9
- Earned run average: 3.55
- Strikeouts: 160
- Saves: 22
- Holds: 23
- Stats at Baseball Reference

Teams
- Yokohama DeNA BayStars (2021–present)

Career highlights and awards
- NPB All-Star (2025)

Taisei Irie (入江 大生, Irie Taisei; born August 26, 1998) is a Japanese professional baseball pitcher for the Yokohama DeNA BayStars of Nippon Professional Baseball (NPB).
