= Shigeo Yanagida =

Japanese baseball player (born 1982)

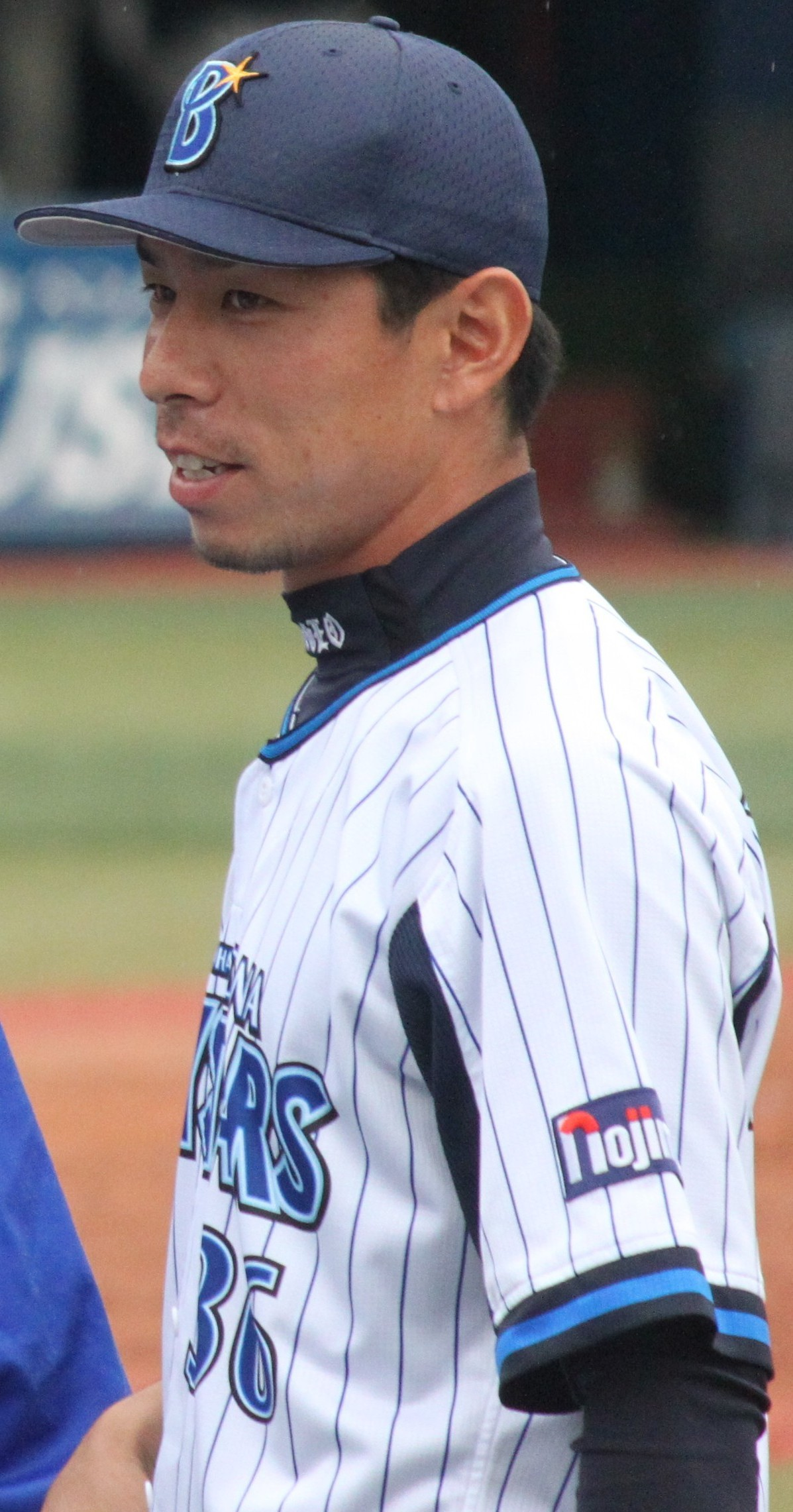
- Yanagida with the Yokohama DeNA BayStars

Yokohama DeNA BayStars – No. 85
- Infielder / Coach
- Born: March 31, 1982 (age 44)
- Bats: Right Throws: Right

NPB debut
- 2007, for the Chunichi Dragons

NPB statistics (through 2016)
- Batting average: .213
- Home runs: 5
- RBI: 18
- Stats at Baseball Reference

Teams
- As player: Chunichi Dragons (2007–2013); Yokohama DeNA BayStars (2014–2016); As coach: Yokohama DeNA BayStars (2018–present)

Shigeo Yanagida (柳田 殖生, born March 31, 1982, in Nishiwaki, Hyōgo, Japan) is a Japanese former professional baseball infielder and current coach for the Yokohama DeNA BayStars in Japan's Nippon Professional Baseball. He played with Chunichi Dragons from 2007 to 2013 and with Yokohama from 2014 to 2016.
