= 2017 Nippon Professional Baseball draft =

2017 Nippon Professional Baseball Draft
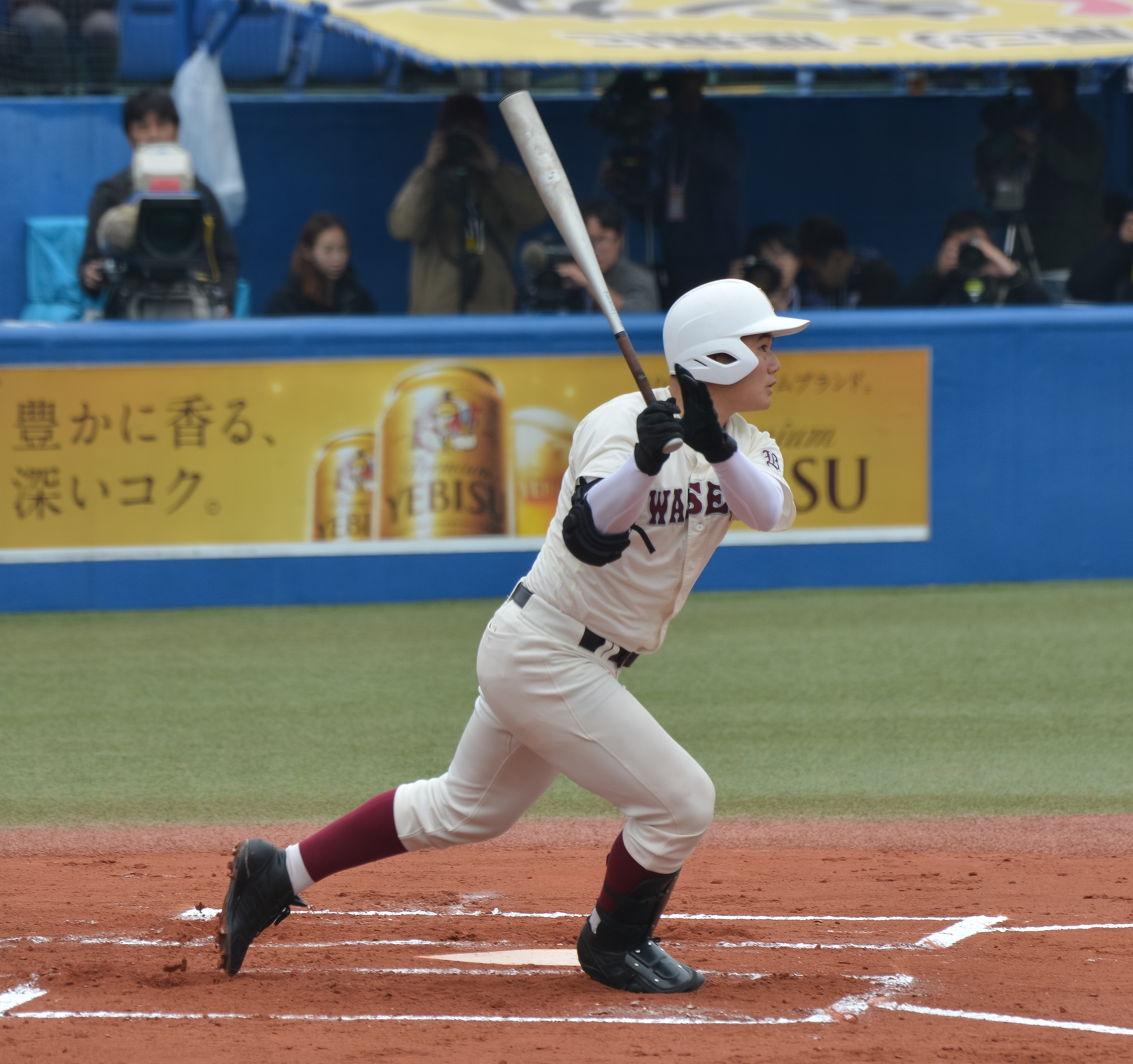
- Kotaro Kiyomiya, who was nominated and a bid lottery for by seven teams.

General information
- Sport: Baseball
- Date: October 26, 2017
- Location: Grand Prince Hotel Takanawa, Tokyo
- Networks: TBS (first round), sky-A
- Sponsored by: Taisho Pharmaceutical

Overview
- 114 total selections in 17 (Includes draft for developmental players) rounds
- League: Nippon Professional Baseball
- First round selections: Kotaro Kiyomiya; Daiki Tajima; Shosei Nakamura

The 2017 Nippon Professional Baseball (NPB) Draft was held on October 26, 2017, for the 53rd time at the Grand Prince Hotel Takanawa to assign amateur baseball players to the NPB. It was arranged with the special cooperation of Taisho Pharmaceutical Co. with official naming rights. The draft was officially called "The Professional Baseball Draft Meeting supported by Lipovitan D". 2017 marked the 5th consecutive year in which Taisho Pharmaceuticals had sponsored the event.

== Summary ==
Only the first round picks were allowed to be contested with all picks from the second round onward being based on table placing in the 2017 NPB season in a waiver system. Waiver priority was based on inter-league results. As the Pacific League teams came out on top against Central League opposition, Pacific League teams were given preference. From the third round the order was reversed continuing in the same fashion until all picks were exhausted.

Apart from the selection of Katsuki Azuma by the Yokohama DeNA Baystars, all other picks in the first round went on to be contested being the most this had occurred since 2008.

87 new players were drafted with a further 28 development players selected.

== First Round Contested Picks ==
	Player name	Position	Teams selected by
First Round	Kotaro Kiyomiya	Infielder	Marines, Swallows, **Fighters**, Giants, Eagles, Tigers, Hawks
First Round	Daiki Tajima	Pitcher	**Buffaloes**, Lions
First Round	Shosei Nakamura	Catcher	**Carp**, Dragons
Second Round	Hisanori Yasuda	Infielder	**Marines**, Tigers, Hawks
Second Round	Munetaka Murakami	Infielder	**Swallows**, Giants, Eagles
Third Round	Kosuke Baba	Pitcher	**Tigers**, Hawks

- **Bolded** teams indicate who won the right to negotiate contract following a lottery.
- In the first round, **Katsuki Azuma** (Pitcher) was selected by the **Baystars** without a bid lottery.
- In the second round, **Hiroshi Suzuki** (Pitcher) was selected by the **Dragons** , and **Hiromasa Saito** (Pitcher) by the **Lions** without a bid lottery.
- In the thrird round, **Takuya Kuwahara** (Pitcher) was selected by the **Giants** , and **Hiroki Kondoh** (Pitcher) by the **Eagles** without a bid lottery.
- In the fourth round, the last remaining the **Hawks**, selected **Haruto Yoshizumi** (Pitcher)
- List of selected players.

== Selected Players ==
Key
*	Player did not sign

- The order of the teams is the order of second round waiver priority.
- **Bolded** After that, a developmental player who contracted as a registered player under control.
- List of selected players.

=== Chiba Lotte Marines ===
Pick	Player name	Position	Team
#1	Hisanori Yasuda	Infielder	Riseisha High School
#2	Yudai Fujioka	Infielder	Toyota Motors
#3	Daiki Yamamoto	Pitcher	Mitsubishi Motors Ozaki
#4	Tsuyoshi Sugano	Outfielder	Hitachi
#5	Keita Watanabe	Pitcher	NTT Communications East Japan
#6	Shoji Nagano	Pitcher	Honda
Developmental Player Draft
#1	**Koshiro Wada**	Outfielder	Toyama GRN Thunderbirds
#2	**Ryotaro Mori**	Pitcher	Miyakonojo Commercial High School

=== Tokyo Yakult Swallows ===
Pick	Player name	Position	Team
#1	Munetaka Murakami	Infielder	Kyushu Gakuin High School
#2	Yuma Ohshita	Pitcher	Mitsubishi Heavy Industries Hiroshima
#3	Harutaka Kuramoto	Pitcher	Okayama Shoka University
#4	Yasutaka Shiomi	Outfielder	JX-ENEOS
#5	Yuto Kanakubo	Pitcher	Tokai University Ichihara Boyo High School
#6	Takeshi Miyamoto	Infielder	Nara Gakuen University
#7	Naoki Matsumoto	Catcher	Seino Transportation
#8	Takumi Numata	Pitcher	Ishikawa Million Stars

=== Hokkaido Nippon-Ham Fighters ===
Pick	Player name	Position	Team
#1	Kotaro Kiyomiya	Infielder	Waseda Jitsugyo High School
#2	Takahiro Nishimura	Pitcher	NTT Communications East Japan
#3	Eito Tanaka	Pitcher	Yanagigaura High School
#4	Yuhei Nanba	Infielder	Soshi Gakuen High School
#5	Ryuji Kitaura	Pitcher	Hakuoh University Ashikaga High School
#6	Ryotaro Suzuki	Pitcher	Tohoku Gakuin University
#7	Kohei Miyadai	Pitcher	Tokyo University

=== Chunichi Dragons ===
Pick	Player name	Position	Team
#1	Hiroshi Suzuki	Pitcher	Yamaha
#2	Sho Ishikawa	Pitcher	Seirantaito High School
#3	Wataru Takamatsu	Infielder	Takikawa Daini High School
#4	Tatsuya Shimizu	Pitcher	Hanasaki Tokuharu High School
#5	Kosuke Itoh	Outfielder	Chukyo University High School
#6	Takumi Yamamoto	Pitcher	Nishinomiya Municipal High School
Developmental Player Draft
#1	Akito Ohkura	Pitcher	Tokushima Indigo Socks
#2	**Kento Marc Ishida**	Pitcher	Ryukoku University

=== Orix Buffaloes ===
Pick	Player name	Position	Team
#1	Daiki Tajima	Pitcher	JR East
#2	Kōhei Suzuki	Pitcher	Hitachi
#3	Shuhei Fukuda	Infielder	NTT Communications East Japan
#4	Hitomi Honda	Pitcher	Seisa Kokusai High School
#5	Ryō Nishimura	Catcher	Subaru
#6	Hayato Nishiura	Outfielder	Meitoku Gijuku High School
#7	Shinya Hirosawa	Infielder	Oita Commercial High School
#8	Tatsuya Yamaashi	Pitcher	Honda Suzu
Developmental Player Draft
#1	Hiroki Inatomi	Catcher	Sanda Shosei High School
#2	Kohei Azuma	Pitcher	Kobe Koryo Gaken High School
#3	Akihito Hiyane	Infielder	Hiryū High School
#4	Felipe Kisu de Souza	Catcher	Godenba Nishi High School

=== Yomiuri Giants ===
Pick	Player name	Position	Team
#1	Takuya Kuwahara	Pitcher	Chuo University
#2	Yukinori Kishida	Catcher	Osaka Gas
#3	Takumi Ohshiro	Catcher	NTT Communications West Japan
#4	Takumi Kitamura	Infielder	Asia University
#5	Shunta Tanaka	Infielder	Hitachi
#6	Akihiro Wakabayashi	Infielder	JX-ENEOS
#7	Kaito Murakami	Outfielder	Nara Gakuen University
#8	Dai Yuasa	Infielder	Takasaki University of Health & Welfare High School
Developmental Player Draft
#1	Kenshin Higa	Infielder	Morioka University High School
#2	Shingo Yamakami	Pitcher	Tokiwa High School
#3	Shun Kasai	Outfielder	Tohoku Fukushi University
#4	Yudai Tanaka	Pitcher	Haguro High School
#5	Rui Hirobatake	Catcher	Rissho University
#6	Shohei Koyama	Catcher	Kansai University
#7	Koki Orishita	Pitcher	Aratano High School
#8	Sota Arai	Outfielder	Sekine Gakuen High School

=== Tohoku Rakuten Golden Eagles ===
Pick	Player name	Position	Team
#1	Hiroki Kondoh	Pitcher	Okayama Shoka University
#2	Masaki Iwami	Outfielder	Keio University
#3	Tsuyoshi Yamasaki	Intfielder	Kokugakuin University
#4	Yuki Watanabe	Pitcher	Yokohama College of Commerce
#5	Akito Tanaka	Outfielder	Hyogo Blue Sundars
#6	Kenji Nishimaki	Infielder	Sendai Ikuei High School
#7	Kanji Teraoka	Pitcher	Ishikawa Million Stars
Developmental Player Draft
#1	Ryutaro Ide	Pitcher	Kyushu Sangyo University
#2	Kyojiro Matsumoto	Infielder	Kōnan High School
#3	Kazuki Nakamura	Outfielder	Tenri University

=== Yokohama DeNA Baystars ===
Pick	Player name	Position	Team
#1	Katsuki Azuma	Pitcher	Ritsumeikan University
#2	Kazuki Kamizato	Outfielder	Nippon Life
#3	Kosuke Sakaguchi	Pitcher	Hokkai High School
#4	Shunsuke Saito	Pitcher	JX-ENEOS
#5	Shuto Sakurai	Pitcher	Nihon University Dai-san High School
#6	Koki Terada	Pitcher	Ishikawa Million Stars
#7	Shūmei Miyamoto	Infielder	Panasonic
#8	Taishi Kusumoto	Infielder	Tohoku Fukushi University
#9	Yūdai Yamamoto	Catcher	Shiga United Baseball club
Developmental Player Draft
#1	**Koh Nakagawa**	Pitcher	Minoshima High School

=== Saitama Seibu Lions ===
Pick	Player name	Position	Team
#1	Hiromasa Saito	Pitcher	Meiji University
#2	Manaya Nishikawa	Outfielder	Hanasaki Tokuharu High SChool
#3	Sho Itoh	Pitcher	Tokushima Indigo Socks
#4	Kaima Taira	Outfielder	Yaeyama Commercial High School
#5	Kaito Yoza	Pitcher	Gifu Keizai University
#6	Ryusei Tsunashima	Infielder	Itoigawa Hakurei High School
Developmental Player Draft
#1	**Wataru Takagi**	Outfielder	Shinsōkan High School
#2	**Masato Saito**	Catcher	Hokkaido University of Education

=== Hanshin Tigers ===
Pick	Player name	Position	Team
#1	Kosuke Baba	Pitcher	Sendai University
#2	Haruto Takahashi	Pitcher	Asia University
#3	Takahiro Kumagai	Infielder	Rikkyo University
#4	Kairi Shimada	Outfielder	Jobu University
#5	Masaki Tanigawa	Pitcher	Mitsubishi Motors Kyushu
#6	Johichiro Maki	Pitcher	Keishin High School
Developmental Player Draft
#1	**Masaki Ishii**	Pitcher	Jobu University

=== Fukuoka SoftBank Hawks ===
Pick	Player name	Position	Team
#1	Haruto Yoshizumi	Pitcher	Tsuruoka Higashi High School
#2	Rei Takahashi	Pitcher	Senshū University
#3	Shu Masuda	Outfielder	Yokohama High School
#4	Arata Shiino	Pitcher	Kokushikan University
#5	Fumimaru Taura	Pitcher	Shūgakukan High School
Developmental Player Draft
#1	**Shuto Ogata**	Pitcher	Gakuhou Ishikawa High School
#2	**Ukyo Shuto**	Infielder	Tokyo University of Agriculture Hokkaido Okhotsk
#3	**Richard Sunagawa**	Outfielder	Okinawa Shogaku High School
#4	**Kotaro Ohtake**	Pitcher	Waseda University
#5	Yamato Higurashi	Outfielder	Tachibana Gakuen High School
#6	**Yuta Watanabe**	Pitcher	Niigata Albirex Baseball club

=== Hiroshima Toyo Carp ===
Pick	Player name	Position	Team
#1	Shosei Nakamura	Catcher	Koryo High School
#2	Sho Yamaguchi	Pitcher	Kumamoto Technical High School
#3	Makoto Brad Kemna	Pitcher	Nippon Bunri University
#4	Atsushi Nagai	Outfielder	Nishogakusha University High School
#5	Atsushi Endoh	Pitcher	Kasumigaura High School
#6	Takato Hiraoka	Pitcher	Chubu Gakuin University
Developmental Player Draft
#1	Tsubasa Okabayashi	Pitcher	Komono High School
#2	**Reira Fujii**	Pitcher	Omagari Technical High School
#3	Ken Sasaki	Pitcher	Ogasa High School

Preceded by 2016	Nippon Professional Baseball draft	Succeeded by 2018
