= Kōsuke Itō =

Kōsuke Itō may refer to:

- Kosuke Ito (politician)
- Kōsuke Itō (baseball)
