= Shiino =

Shiino (椎野) is a Japanese surname. Notable people with the surname include:

- Arata Shiino (born 1995), Japanese baseball player
- Karolina Shiino (born 1997), Japanese model
