= Akito Ōkura =

Japanese baseball player (born 1994)

Akito Ōkura 大藏 彰人
- Pitcher
- Born: May 14, 1994 (age 32); Toyokawa, Aichi, Japan
- Bats: Right Throws: Right

Teams
- Tokushima Indigo Socks (2017); Chunichi Dragons (2018–2020)

Akito Ōkura (大藏彰人, Ōkura Akito; born May 14, 1994) is a professional Japanese baseball player. He most recently played pitcher for the Chunichi Dragons. He is currently a free agent.

Ōkura is a graduate of Nihon University Ōgaki High School and Aichi Gakuin University. He played one season with the Tokushima Indigo Socks in the Shikoku Island League Plus where he posted a 3.00 ERA over 10 starts and 57 innings.

On 26 October 2017, Ōkura was selected as the 1st draft pick in the development player round for the Chunichi Dragons at the 2017 NPB Draft and on 21 November signed a development player contract with a ¥2,000,000 moving allowance and a ¥3,000,000 yearly salary.
