= Kento Marc Ishida =

Japanese baseball player

Kento Marc Ishida 石田 健人マルク
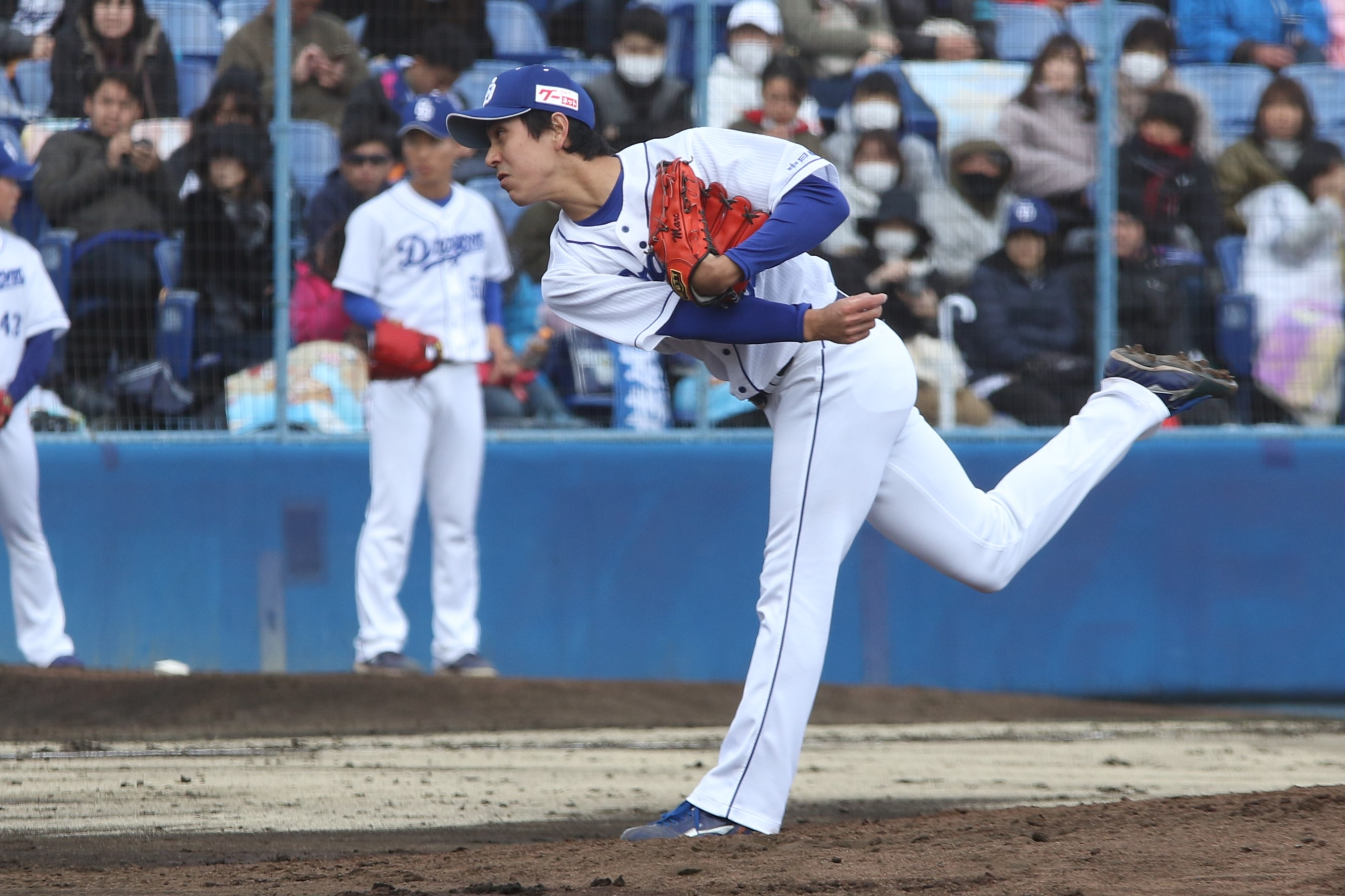

Free agent
- Pitcher
- Born: July 18, 1995 (age 30); Málaga, Spain
- Bats: Right Throws: Right

Teams
- Chunichi Dragons (2018–2022)

Kento Marc Ishida (石田健人マルク, Ishida Kento Maruku; born July 18, 1995) is a Spanish-born Belgian-Japanese professional baseball player who is a free agent.. He has previously played for the Chunichi Dragons of Nippon Professional Baseball.

Ishida was born to a Japanese mother and Belgian (Walloon) father in Spain, but moved to Nagoya, Aichi, Japan when he was 3 months old.

Ishida is a graduate of the Toho High School baseball program where he took over as the ace from future Dragons teammate Taisuke Maruyama. He is also a graduate of Ryukoku University.

On 26 October 2017, Ishida was selected as the 2nd draft pick in the development player round for the Chunichi Dragons at the 2017 NPB Draft and on 7 November signed a development player contract with a ¥2,000,000 moving allowance and a ¥3,000,000 yearly salary.
