= Kōhei Miyadai =

Japanese baseball player (born 1995)

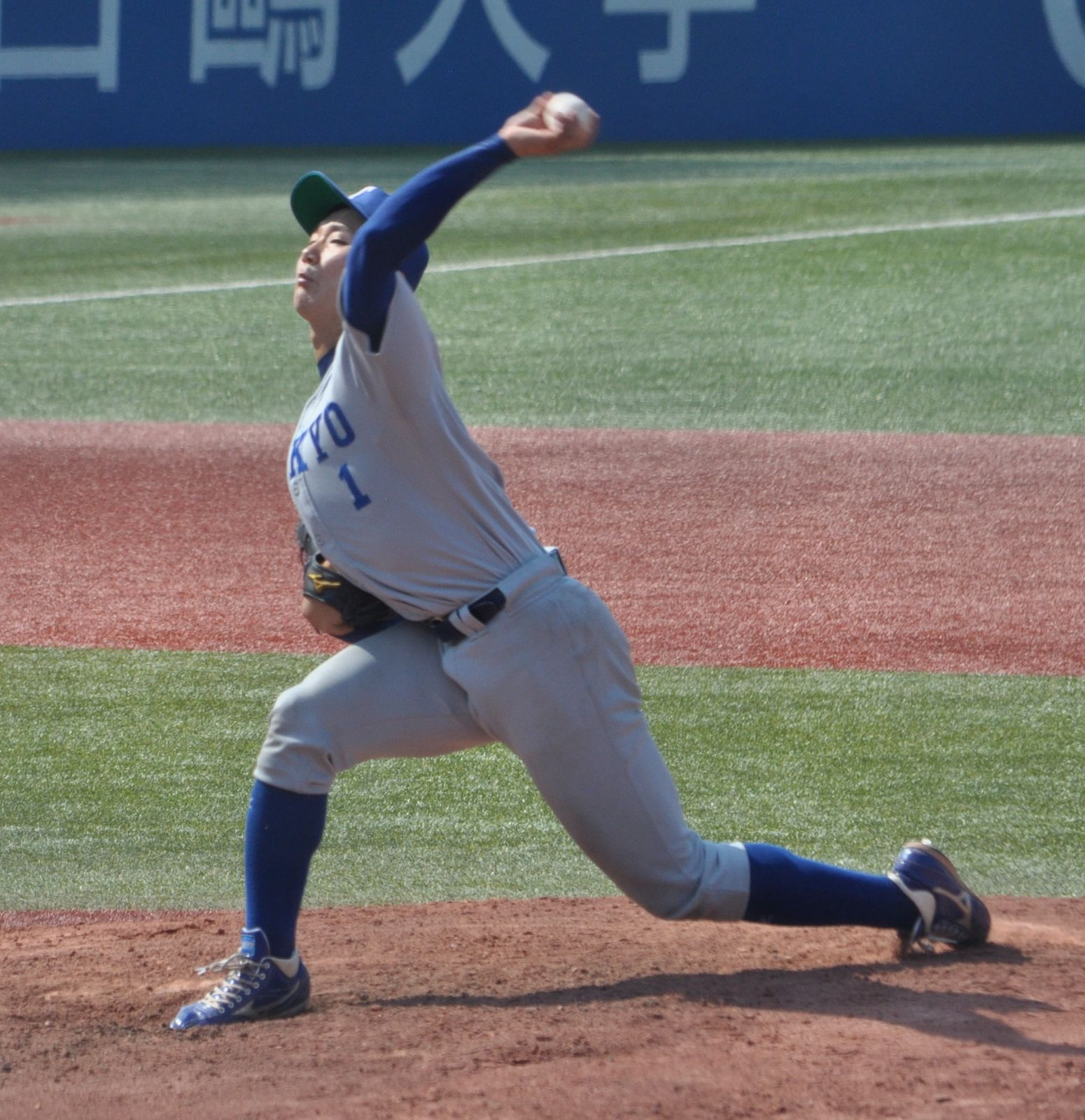
- Pitcher
- Born: July 1, 1995 (age 31); Yokohama, Kanagawa, Japan
- Batted: Left Threw: Left

debut
- August 23, 2018, for the Hokkaido Nippon-Ham Fighters

Last appearance
- July 17, 2022, for the Tokyo Yakult Swallows

Career statistics
- Win–loss record: 0–0
- Earned Run Average: 9.00
- Strikeouts: 7
- Stats at Baseball Reference

Teams
- Hokkaido Nippon-Ham Fighters (2018); Tokyo Yakult Swallows (2022)

Kōhei Miyadai (宮台 康平, Miyadai Kōhei; born July 1, 1995) is a Japanese professional baseball pitcher for the Tokyo Yakult Swallows of Nippon Professional Baseball (NPB). He has played in Nippon Professional Baseball (NPB) for the Hokkaido Nippon-Ham Fighters.

== Baseball career ==
=== Hokkaido Nippon-Ham Fighters ===
Hokkaido Nippon-Ham Fighters selected Miyadai with the seventh selection in the 2017 NPB draft.

On August 23, 2018, Miyadai made his NPB debut.

On December 2, 2020, he become a free agent.

=== Tokyo Yakult Swallows ===
On December 23, 2020, Miyadai signed with Tokyo Yakult Swallows of NPB.

== Legal career ==
Miyadai graduated from the Graduate Schools for Law and Politics and Faculty of Law, University of Tokyo, passed the bar examination in November 2025 and began working at TMI Associates.
