= Hiroki Kondo (pitcher) =

Japanese baseball player (born 1995)

Hiroki Kondo 近藤 弘樹
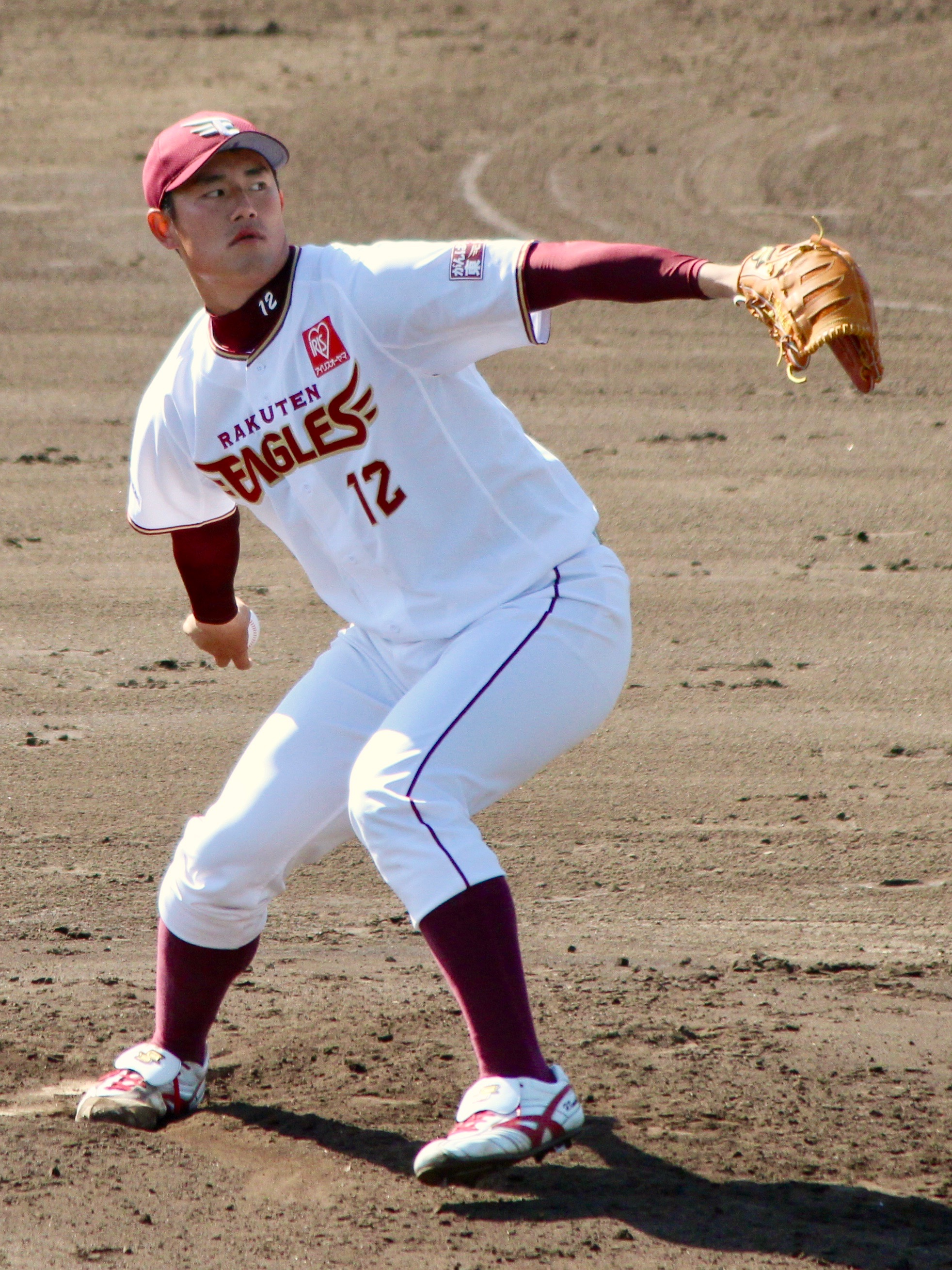
- Kondoh with the Tohoku Rakuten Golden Eagles
- Pitcher
- Born: June 27, 1995 (age 30); Hiroshima, Hiroshima Prefecture, Japan
- Batted: Right Threw: Right

NPB debut
- June 6, 2018, for the Tohoku Rakuten Golden Eagles

Last NPB appearance
- May 26, 2021, for the Tokyo Yakult Swallows

NPB statistics
- Win–loss record: 0–5
- Earned run average: 5.23
- Strikeouts: 39
- Saves: 0
- Holds: 12
- Stats at Baseball Reference

Teams
- Tohoku Rakuten Golden Eagles (2018–2020); Tokyo Yakult Swallows (2021–2024)

Hiroki Kondo (近藤 弘樹, Kondō Hiroki; born June 27, 1995) is a Japanese professional baseball pitcher for the Tokyo Yakult Swallows of the Nippon Professional Baseball (NPB). He has played in NPB for the Tohoku Rakuten Golden Eagles.

== Career ==
=== Tohoku Rakuten Golden Eagles ===
Tohoku Rakuten Golden Eagles selected Kondo with the first selection in the 2017 NPB draft.

On June 6, 2018, Kondo made his NPB debut.

On December 2, 2020, he become a free agent.

=== Tokyo Yakult Swallows ===
On December 14, 2020, Kondo signed with the Tokyo Yakult Swallows of NPB.
