= Takuya Kuwahara =

Japanese baseball player (born 1996)

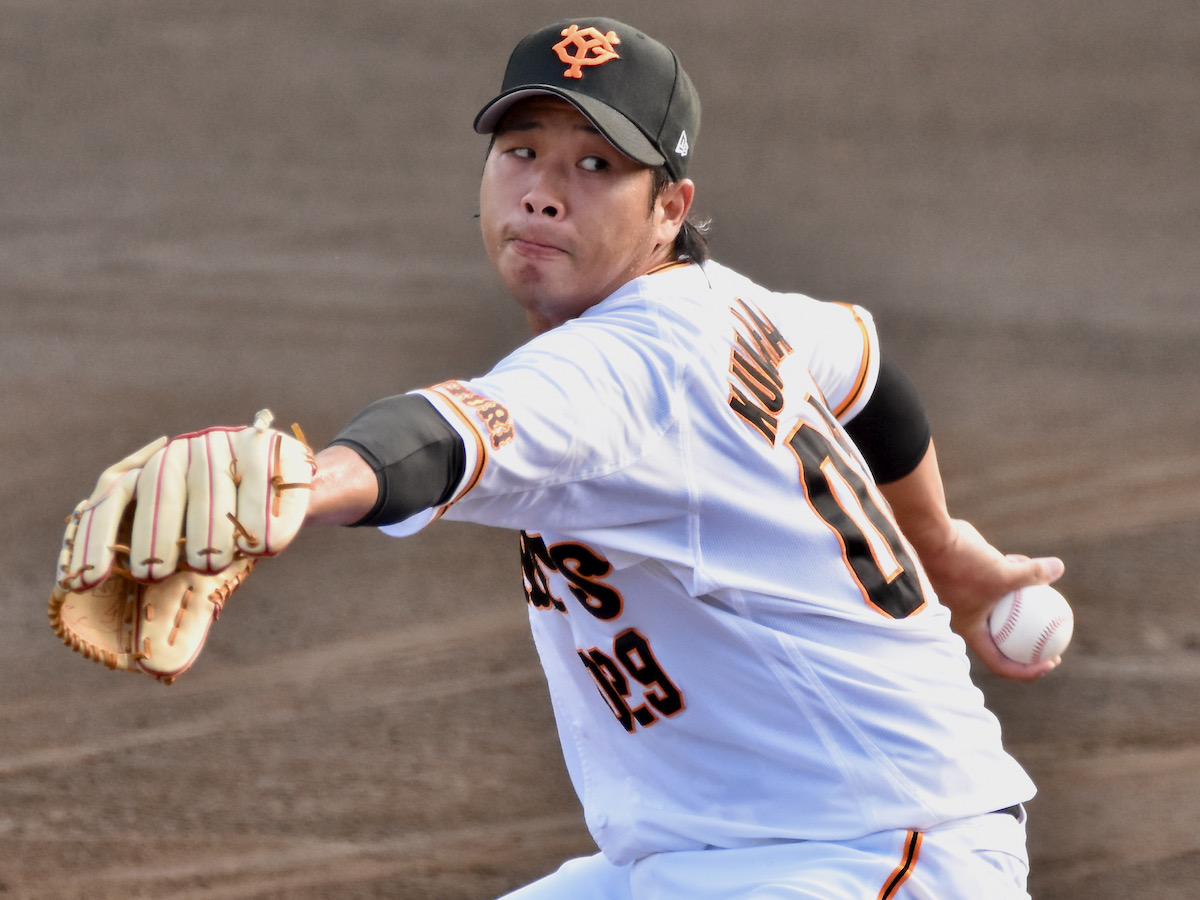
- Kuwahara with the Yomiuri Giants.
- Pitcher
- Born: March 26, 1996 (age 30); Gose, Nara, Japan
- Batted: Right Threw: Right

NPB debut
- May 31, 2018, for the Yomiuri Giants

Last NPB appearance
- June 4, 2023, for the Yomiuri Giants

Career statistics (through 2023 season)
- Win–loss record: 5-5
- ERA: 5.80
- Holds: 16
- Saves: 0
- Strikeouts: 91
- Stats at Baseball Reference

Teams
- Yomiuri Giants (2018–2023); Fukuoka SoftBank Hawks (2024)

Takuya Kuwahara (鍬原 拓也, Kuwahara Takuya; born March 26, 1996) is a Japanese professional baseball pitcher for the Fukuoka SoftBank Hawks of Nippon Professional Baseball (NPB).

He previously played for the Yomiuri Giants.

== Professional career ==
=== Yomiuri Giants ===
On October 26, 2017, Kuwahara was drafted first round pick by the Yomiuri Giants in the 2017 Nippon Professional Baseball draft.

On May 31, 2018, Kuwahara pitched his debut game in the interleague play against the Hokkaido Nippon-Ham Fighters. On June 14, in the interleague play against the Fukuoka SoftBank Hawks, he became the winning pitcher for the first time. He pitched 5 games in his rookie year.

Kuwahara pitched only 14 games in three seasons. on July 4, 2020, he became the winning pitcher for the first time in two years in a game against the Chunichi Dragons, but on August 12, he fractured his right elbow and underwent surgery.

On December 8, 2020, the Giants re-signed him as a developmental player with an estimated salary of 13.2 million yen.

On August 30, 2021, the Giants re-signed Kuwahara as a registered player under control. However, he did not have a chance to pitch in the first league, and on December 9, he was re-signed as a developmental player for 10.6 million yen.

On March 11, 2022, Kuwahara re-signed as a registered player under control. In 2022 season, Kuwahara pitched in a career-high 49 games as a setup man, finished the regular season with a 3-2 win–loss record, 13 holds, and a 5.16 ERA.

In 2023 season, Kuwahara only had a chance to pitched five games in the first league, and the Giants released him on October 28.

=== Fukuoka SoftBank Hawks ===
On November 28, 2023, Kuwahara signed as a developmental player with the Fukuoka SoftBank Hawks.
