= Hiroshi Suzuki (baseball) =

Japanese baseball player (born 1997)

Hiroshi Suzuki 博志
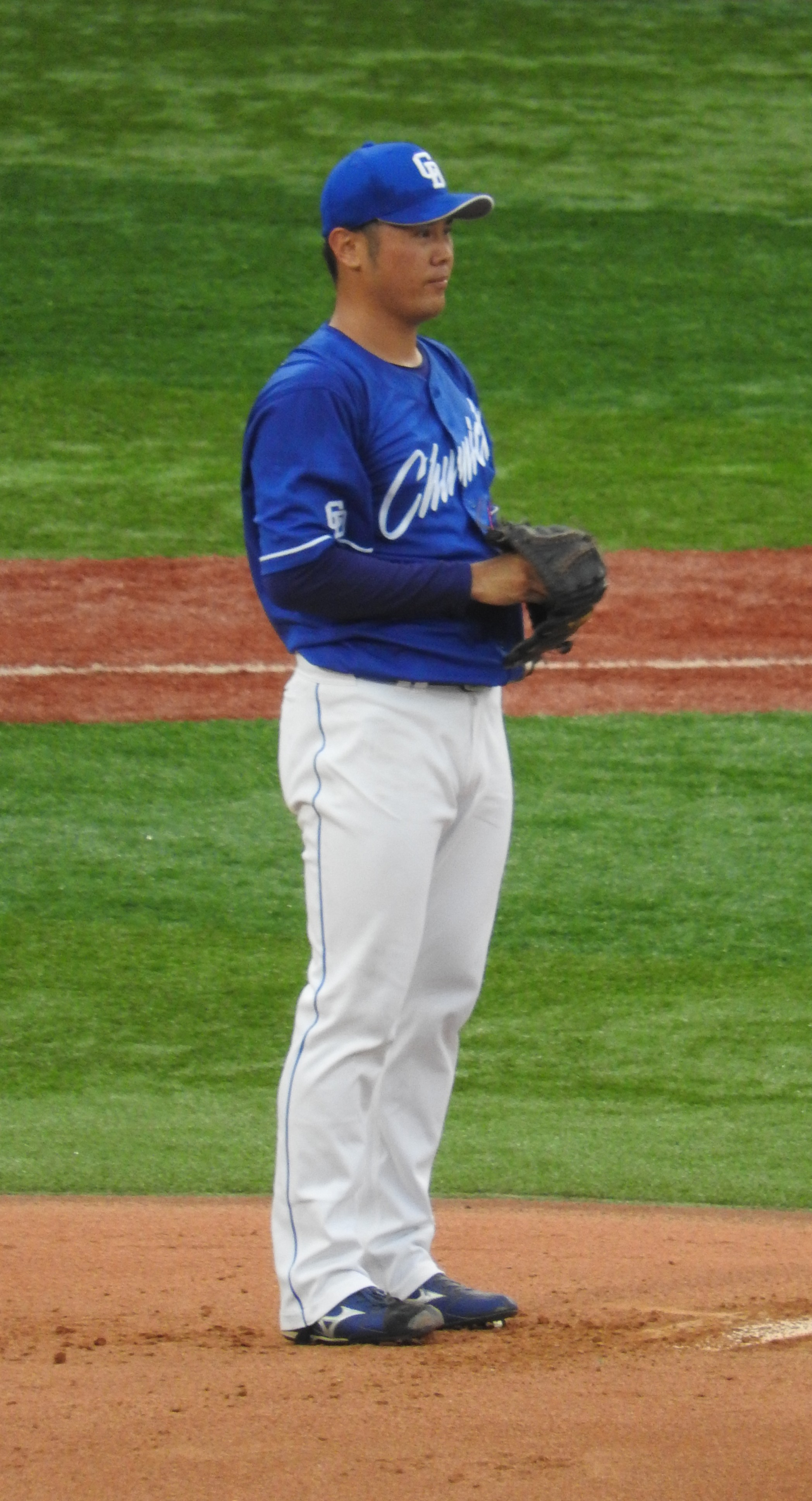

Orix Buffaloes – No. 66
- Pitcher
- Born: March 22, 1997 (age 29); Kakegawa, Shizuoka, Japan
- Bats: Right Throws: Right

NPB debut
- April 1, 2018, for the Chunichi Dragons

NPB statistics (through 2024 season)
- Win–loss record: 8-12
- Innings pitched: 178.2
- Earned run average: 4.48
- Strikeouts: 119
- Saves: 18
- Holds: 24
- Stats at Baseball Reference

Teams
- Chunichi Dragons (2018–2023); Orix Buffaloes (2024–Present)

Hiroshi Suzuki (鈴木 博志, Suzuki Hiroshi; born March 22, 1997) also known as Hiroshi (博志) is a professional Japanese baseball player. He plays pitcher for the Orix Buffaloes.

== Early career ==
On October 20, 2017, Hiroshi was selected as the 1st draft pick for the Chunichi Dragons at the 2017 NPB Draft and on November 20 signed a provisional contract with a ¥100,000,000 sign-on bonus and a ¥15,000,000 yearly salary with ¥50,000,000 in incentives.

On December 8, 2023, Hiroshi was selected by the Orix Buffaloes in the 2023 Active Player Draft.

== Personal ==
Hiroshi's hobbies include golf, basketball and cycling. Hiroshi counts former San Diego Padres, Atlanta Braves and Boston Red Sox closer Craig Kimbrel as his idol. He deliberately chose to wear the number 46 as an homage to Kimbrel.

On 23 January 2019, it was announced that Hiroshi had married.
