= Kosuke Sakaguchi =

Japanese baseball player (born 1999)

Kōsuke Sakaguchi
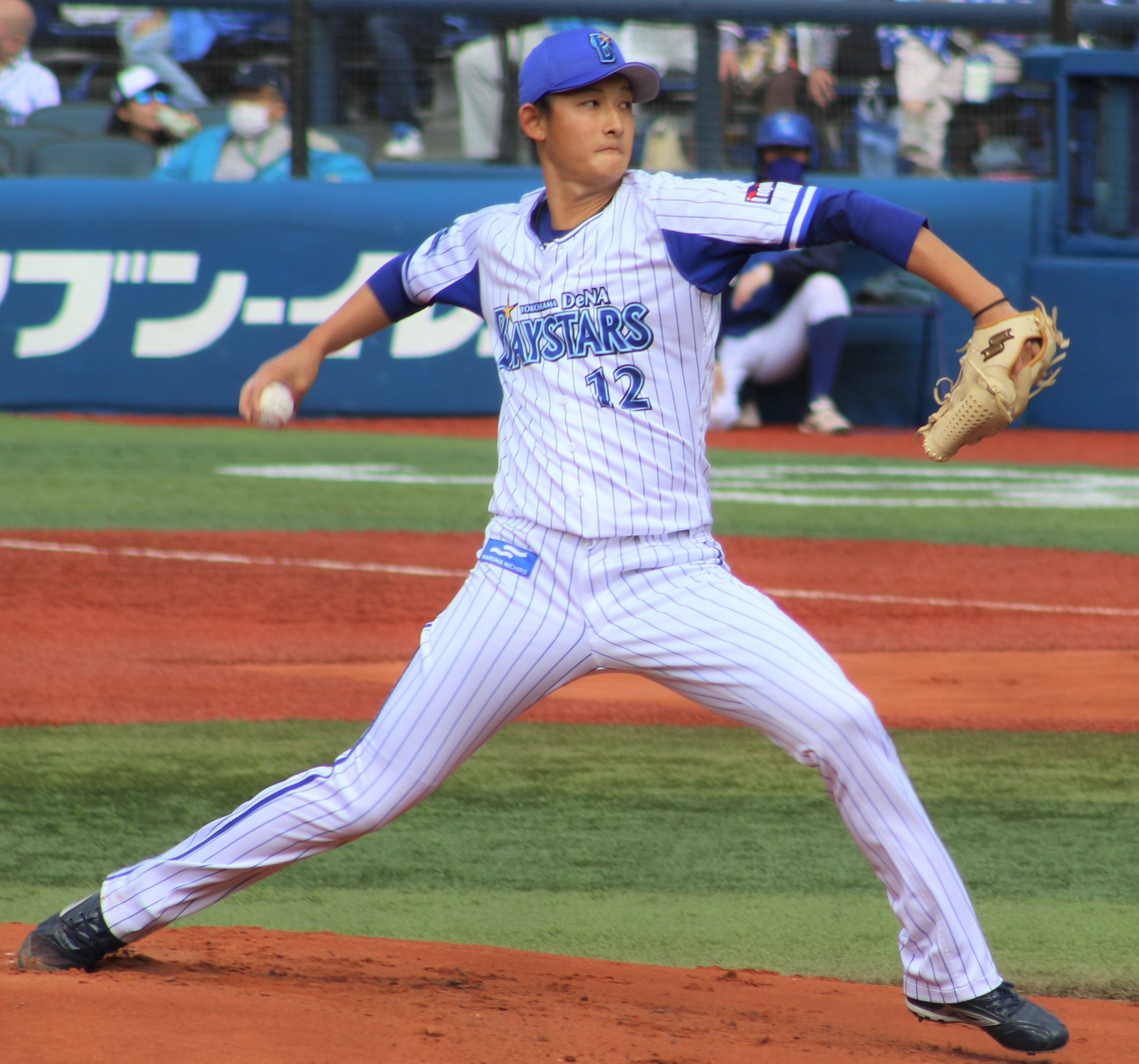
- Sakaguchi with the Yokohama DeNA BayStars

Tokyo Yakult Swallows – No. 66
- Pitcher
- Born: August 15, 1999 (age 26); Taishō-ku, Osaka, Japan
- Bats: Left Throws: Right

NPB debut
- May 3, 2019, for the Yokohama DeNA BayStars

Career statistics (through 2024 season)
- Win–loss record: 2-9
- Earned Run Average: 5.47
- Strikeouts: 57
- Saves: 0
- Holds: 2
- Stats at Baseball Reference

Teams
- Yokohama DeNA BayStars (2018–2023); Tokyo Yakult Swallows (2023–present)

Kōsuke Sakaguchi (阪口 皓亮, Sakaguchi Kōsuke; born August 15, 1999 in Osaka, Osaka, Japan) is a professional Japanese baseball player. He plays pitcher for the Tokyo Yakult Swallows.
