= Taishi Kusumoto =

Japanese baseball player (born 1995)

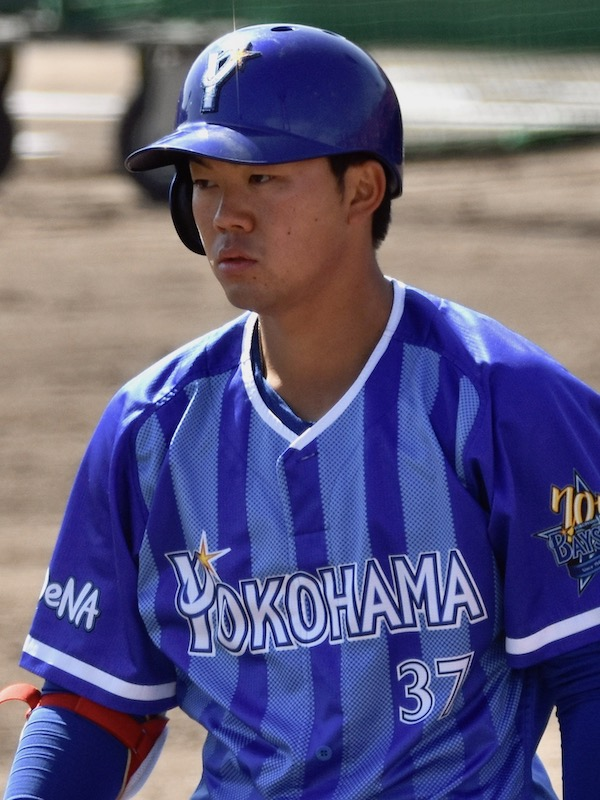

Hanshin Tigers – No. 55
- Outfielder
- Born: July 7, 1995 (age 30); Suita, Osaka, Japan
- Bats: Left Throws: Right

NPB debut
- March 30, 2018, for the Yokohama DeNA BayStars

Career statistics (through 2024 season)
- Batting average: .224
- Hits: 169
- Home runs: 12
- RBI: 79
- Stolen bases: 9
- Stats at Baseball Reference

Teams
- Yokohama DeNA BayStars (2018-2024); Hanshin Tigers (2025-present)

Taishi Kusumoto (楠本 泰史, Kusumoto Taishi; born July 7, 1995 in Suita, Osaka, Japan) is a professional Japanese baseball player. He is an outfielder for the Hanshin Tigers of Nippon Professional Baseball (NPB).
