= Shuhei Fukuda (baseball, born 1992) =

Japanese baseball player (born 1992)

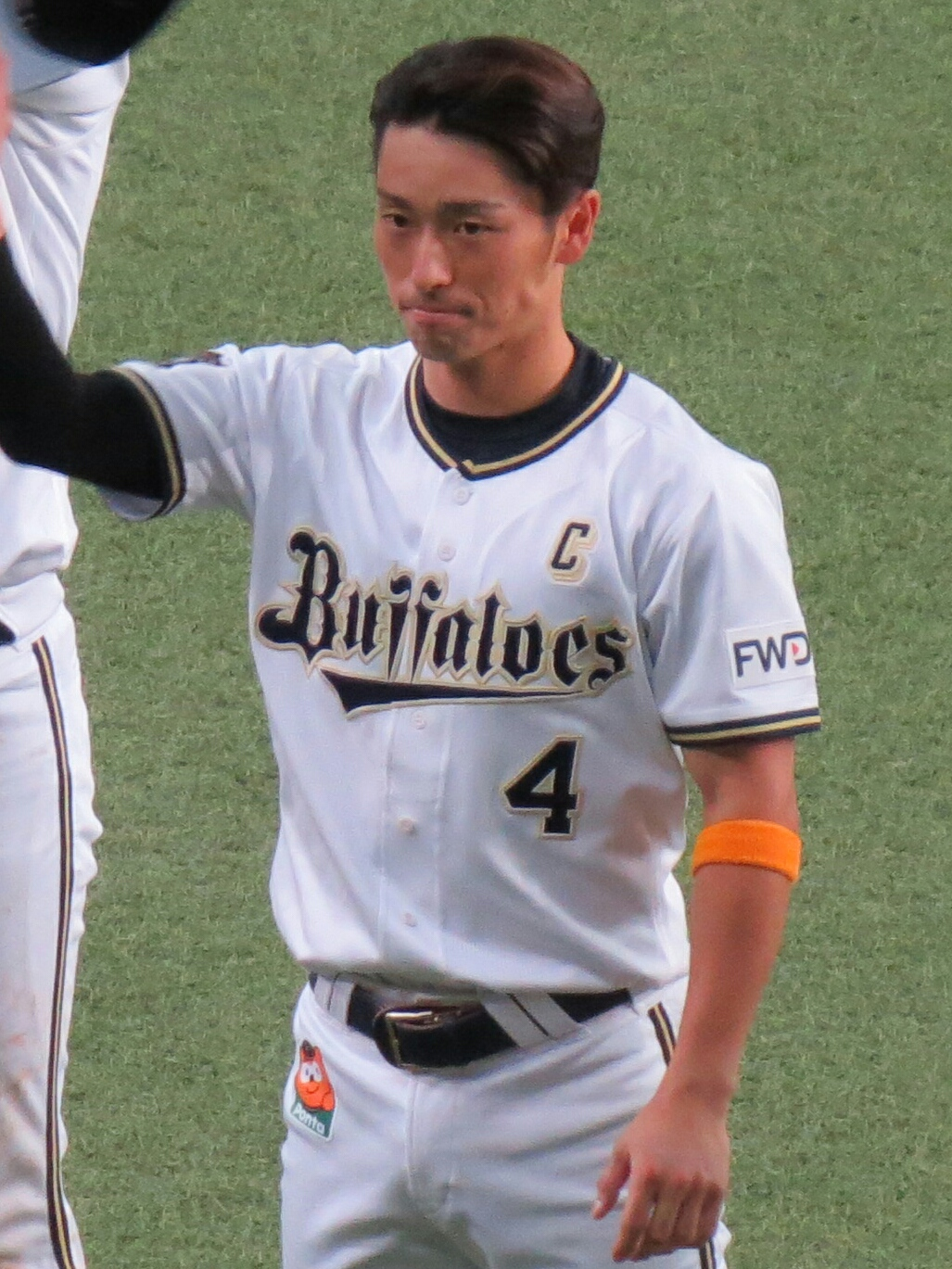
- Infielder
- Born: August 8, 1992 (age 33); Hannan, Osaka, Japan
- Batted: Left Threw: Right

NPB debut
- April 8, 2018, for the Orix Buffaloes

Last NPB appearance
- August 7, 2025, for the Orix Buffaloes

NPB statistics
- Batting average: .254
- Home runs: 5
- Runs batted in: 143
- Stats at Baseball Reference

Teams
- Orix Buffaloes (2018–2025)

Career highlights and awards
- Japan Series champion (2022); Mitsui Golden Glove Award (2022)

Shuhei Fukuda (福田 周平, Fukuda Shuhei; born August 8, 1992) is a Japanese professional baseball infielder for the Orix Buffaloes of Nippon Professional Baseball (NPB).
