= Tatsuya Yamaashi =

Japanese baseball player (born 1993)

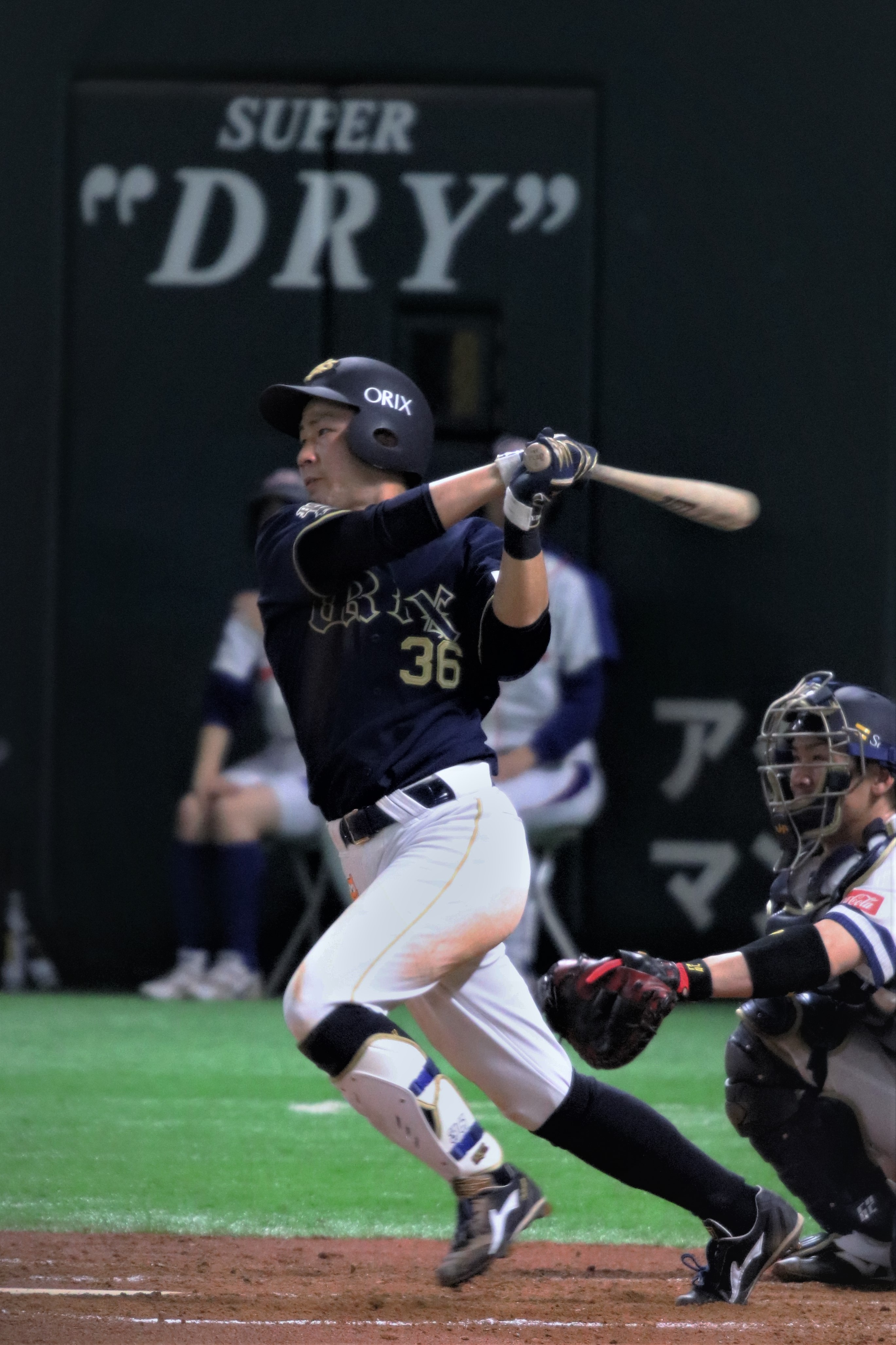

Hiroshima Toyo Carp – No. 69
- Infielder
- Born: October 26, 1993 (age 32); Hirakata, Osaka, Japan
- Bats: Right Throws: Right

NPB debut
- May 30, 2018, for the Orix Buffaloes

NPB statistics (through 2023 season)
- Batting average: .197
- Hits: 63
- Home runs: 4
- RBIs: 23
- Stolen bases: 8

Teams
- Orix Buffaloes (2018–2024); Hiroshima Toyo Carp (2025–present)

Career highlights and awards
- Japan Series champion (2022)

Tatsuya Yamaashi (山足 達也, Yamaashi Tatsuya; born October 26, 1993 in Hirakata, Osaka, Japan) is a professional Japanese baseball player. He plays infielder for the Hiroshima Toyo Carp.
