= Kairi Shimada =

Japanese baseball player (born 1996)

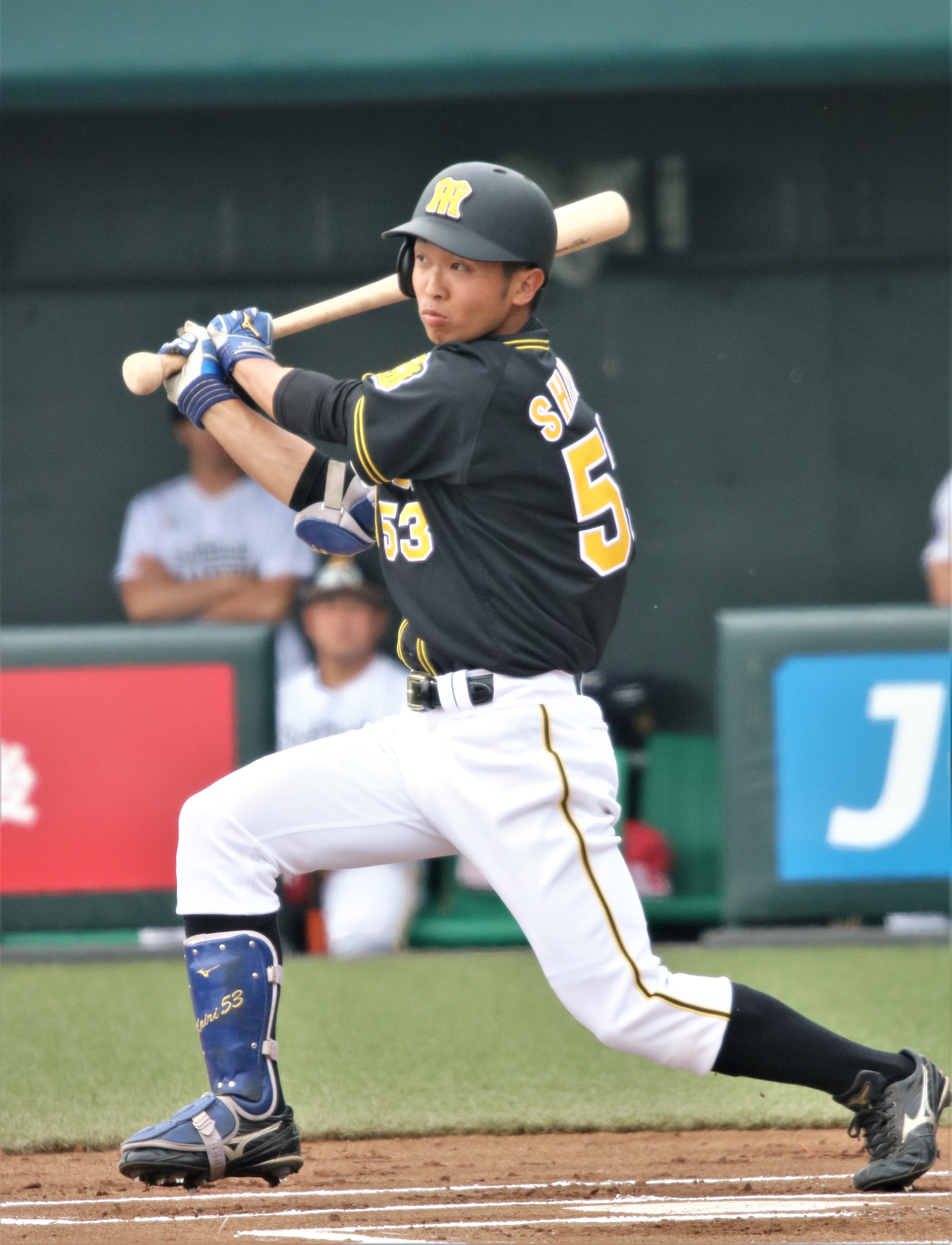

Hanshin Tigers – No. 53
- Outfielder
- Born: February 6, 1996 (age 30); Uto, Kumamoto, Japan
- Bats: Left Throws: Right

NPB debut
- April 1, 2018, for the Hanshin Tigers

Career statistics (through 2024 season)
- Batting average: .236
- Hits: 148
- Home runs: 1
- RBI: 36
- Stolen bases: 44
- Stats at Baseball Reference

Teams
- Hanshin Tigers (2018–present)

Kairi Shimada (島田 海吏, Shimada Kairi; born February 6, 1996) is a professional Japanese baseball outfielder for the Hanshin Tigers of Nippon Professional Baseball (NPB).
