= Koshiro Wada =

Japanese baseball player (born 1999)

Kōshirō Wada
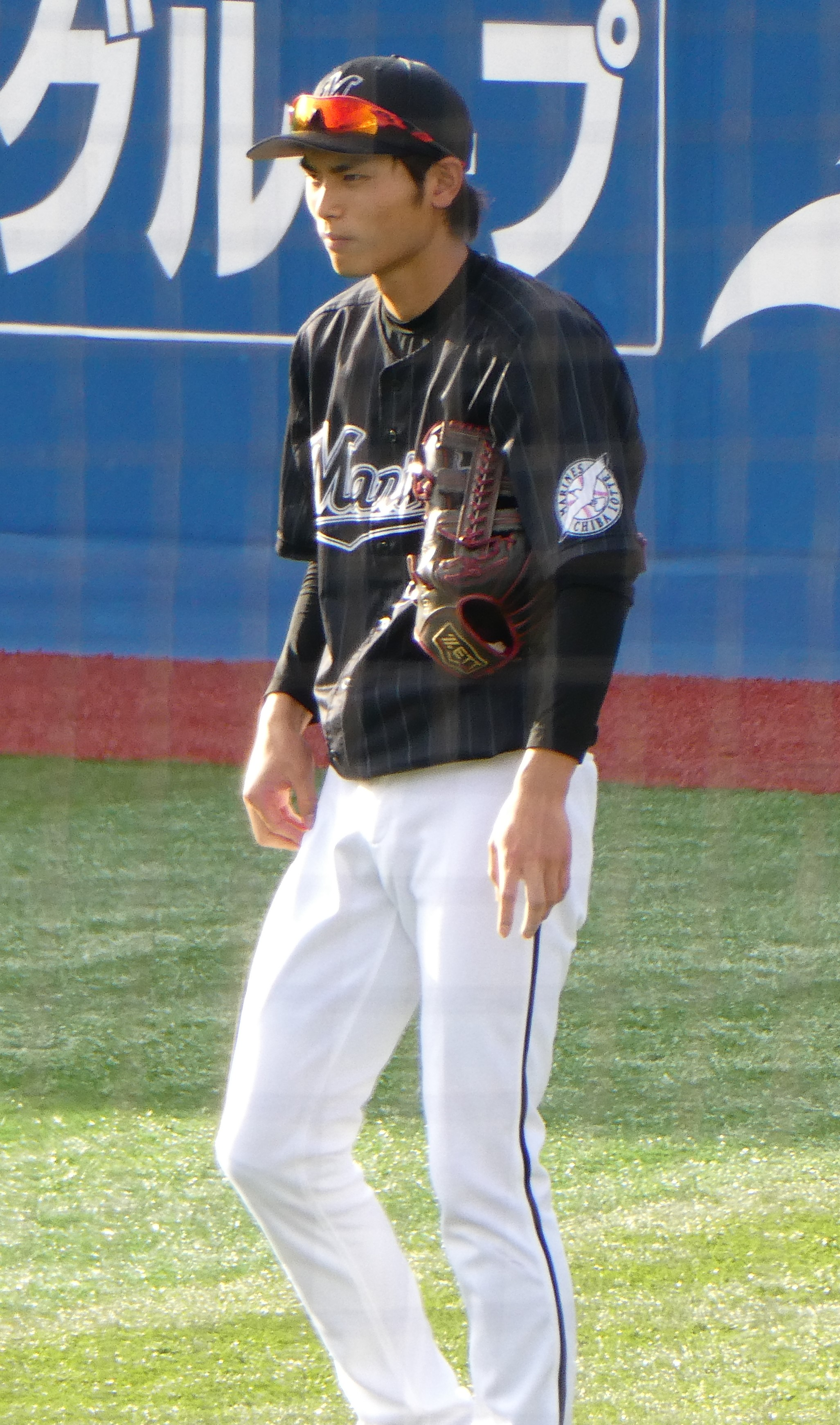

Chiba Lotte Marines – No. 63
- Outfielder
- Born: January 14, 1999 (age 27); Higashimatsuyama, Saitama, Japan
- Bats: Left Throws: Left

debut
- June 19, 2020, for the Chiba Lotte Marines

NPB statistics (through 2023 season)
- Batting average: .235
- Hits: 48
- Home runs: 3
- Runs batted in: 11
- Sacrifice bunt: 7
- Stolen base: 78

Teams
- Chiba Lotte Marines (2018–present)

Career highlights and awards
- 1× Pacific League stolen base champion (2021)

Kōshirō Wada (和田 康士朗, Wada Kōshirō; born January 14, 1999 in Higashimatsuyama, Saitama Prefecture) is a professional Japanese baseball player. He plays outfielder for the Chiba Lotte Marines.
