= Dai Yuasa =

Japanese baseball player (born 2000)

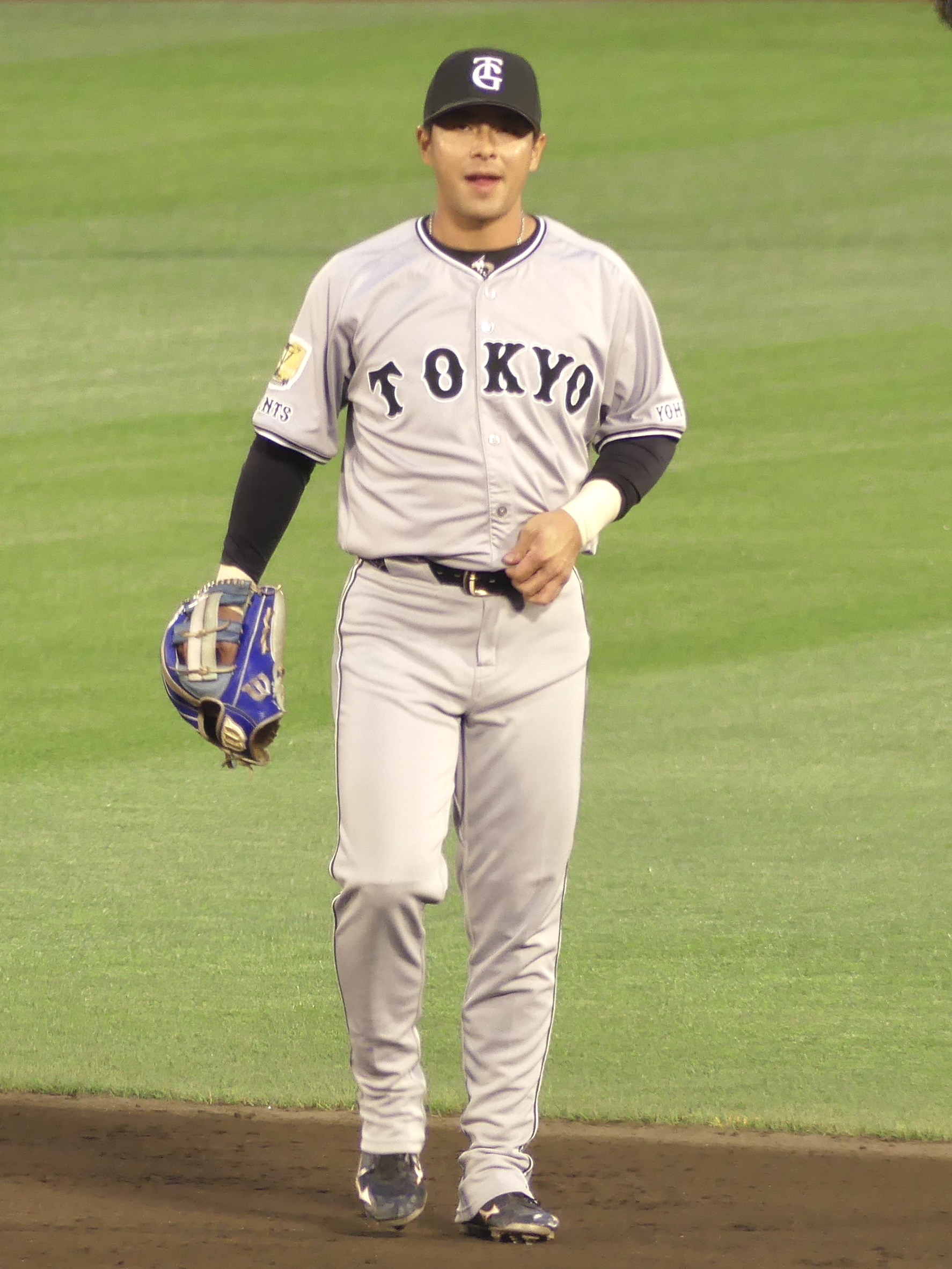

Yomiuri Giants – No. 00
- Infielder
- Born: January 24, 2000 (age 25); Tomioka, Gunma, Japan
- Bats: Right Throws: Right

NPB debut
- June 19, 2020, for the Yomiuri Giants

NPB statistics (through 2023 season)
- Batting average: .160
- Home runs: 1
- RBI: 3
- Hits: 8
- Stolen base: 6
- Sacrifice bunt: 3

Teams
- Yomiuri Giants (2018–present)

Dai Yuasa (湯浅 大, Yuasa Dai; born January 24, 2000 in Tomioka, Gunma, Japan) is a professional Japanese baseball player. He plays infielder for the Yomiuri Giants.
