= Shūmei Miyamoto =

Japanese baseball player (born 1996)

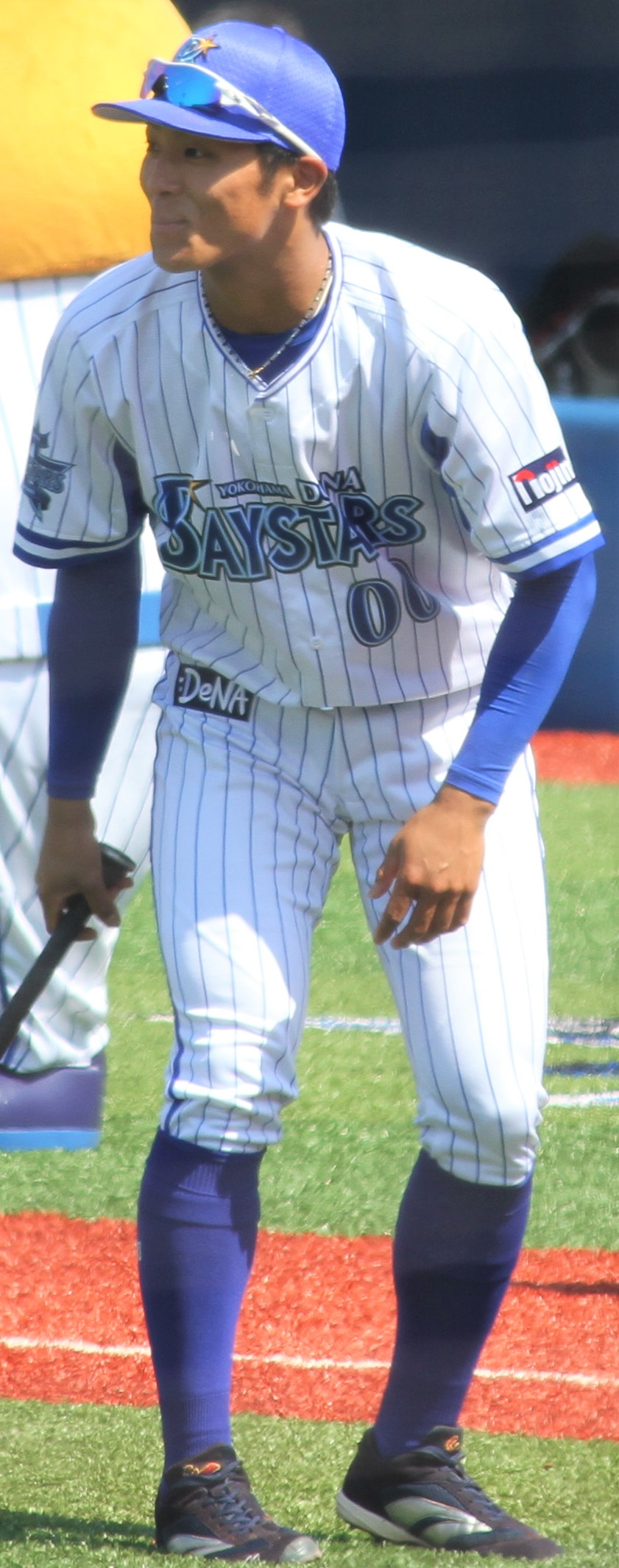
- Miyamoto with the Yokohama DeNA BayStars

Yokohama DeNA BayStars – No. 00
- Infielder
- Born: July 24, 1996 (age 29); Yatsushiro, Kumamoto, Japan
- Bats: Left Throws: Right

NPB debut
- March 30, 2018, for the Yokohama DeNA BayStars

Career statistics (through 2020 season)
- Batting average: .200
- Home runs: 2
- Runs batted in: 2
- Stats at Baseball Reference

Teams
- Yokohama DeNA BayStars (2018–present)

Shūmei Miyamoto (宮本 秀明, Miyamoto Shūmei) (born July 24, 1996) is a Japanese professional baseball player. He plays infielder for the Yokohama DeNA BayStars.
