= Takeshi Miyamoto (baseball) =

Japanese baseball player (born 1995)

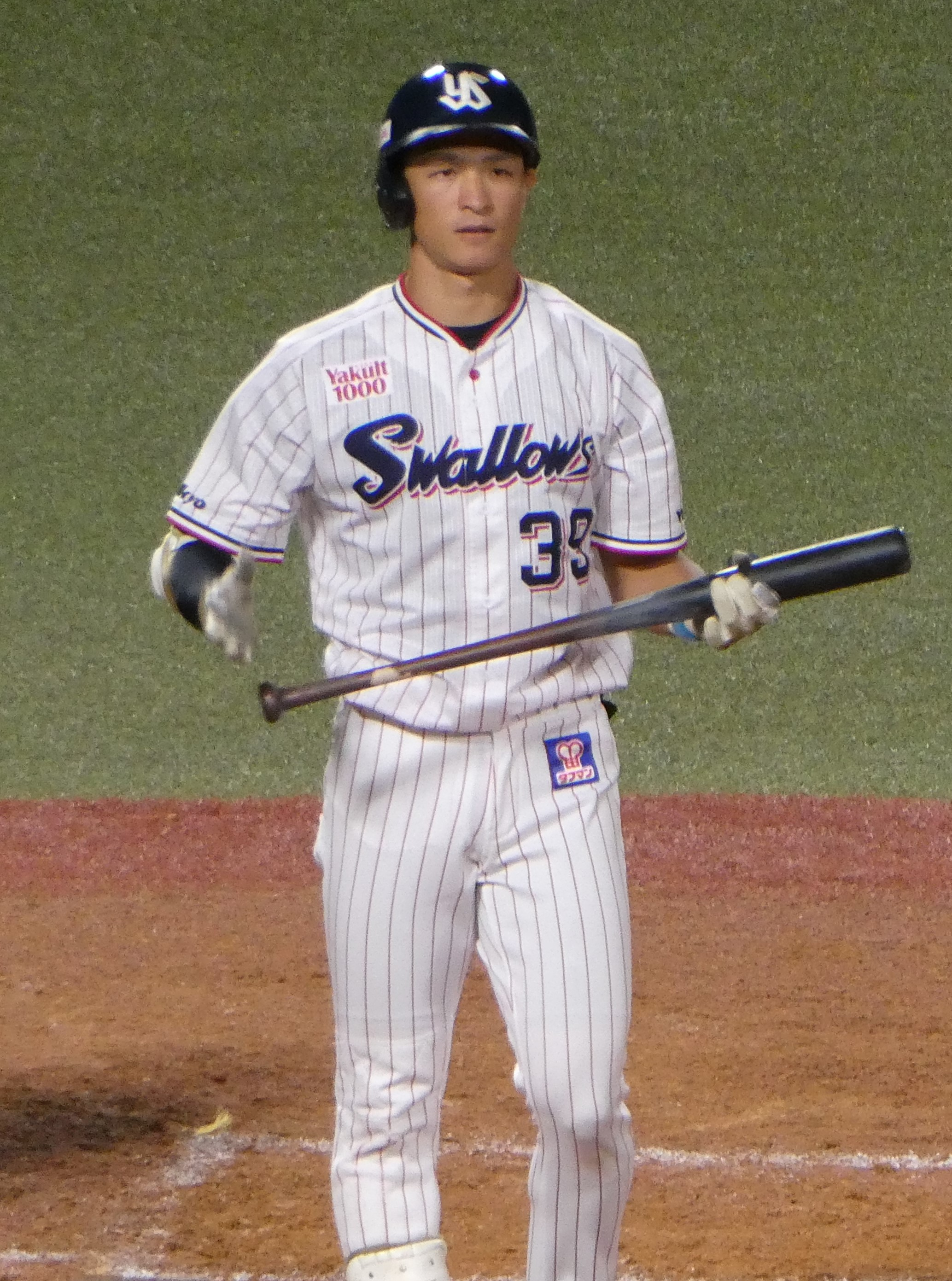
- Miyamoto with the Tokyo Yakult Swallows

Tokyo Yakult Swallows – No. 10
- Infielder
- Born: April 3, 1995 (age 31); Toyonaka, Osaka, Japan
- Bats: Left Throws: Right

debut
- June 26, 2018, for the Tokyo Yakult Swallows

Career statistics (through 2024 season)
- Batting average: .249
- Hits: 162
- Home runs: 4
- RBIs: 47
- Stolen bases: 7
- Stats at Baseball Reference

Teams
- Tokyo Yakult Swallows (2018–present)

Career highlights and awards
- 1× Japan Series champion (2021)

Takeshi Miyamoto (宮本 丈, Miyamoto Takeshi; born April 3, 1995 in Toyonaka, Osaka, Japan) is a Japanese professional baseball player. He plays infielder for the Tokyo Yakult Swallows.
