= Shōsei Nakamura =

Japanese baseball player (born 1999)

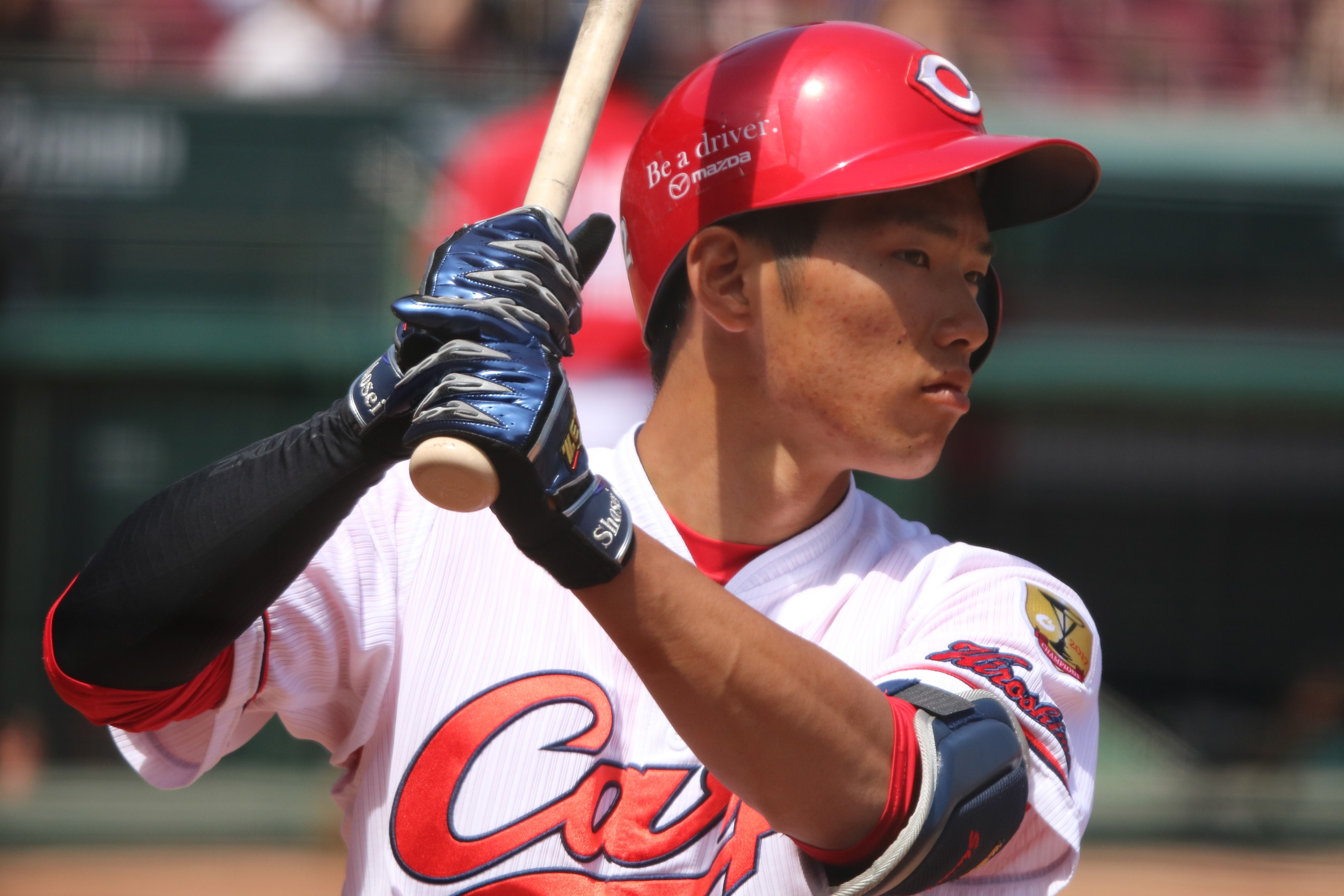

Hiroshima Toyo Carp – No. 96
- Catcher, Outfielder
- Born: June 6, 1999 (age 26); Hatsukaichi, Hiroshima, Japan
- Bats: Right Throws: Right

NPB debut
- July 26, 2020, for the Hiroshima Toyo Carp

NPB statistics (through 2025 season)
- Batting average: .249
- Home runs: 11
- RBI: 44
- Stolen Bases: 5

Teams
- Hiroshima Toyo Carp (2018–present)

Shōsei Nakamura (中村 奨成, Nakamura Shōsei; born July 6, 1999 in Hatsukaichi, Hiroshima, Japan) is a professional Japanese baseball player. He plays catcher and outfielder for the Hiroshima Toyo Carp.
