= Takumi Kitamura (baseball) =

Japanese baseball player (born 1995)

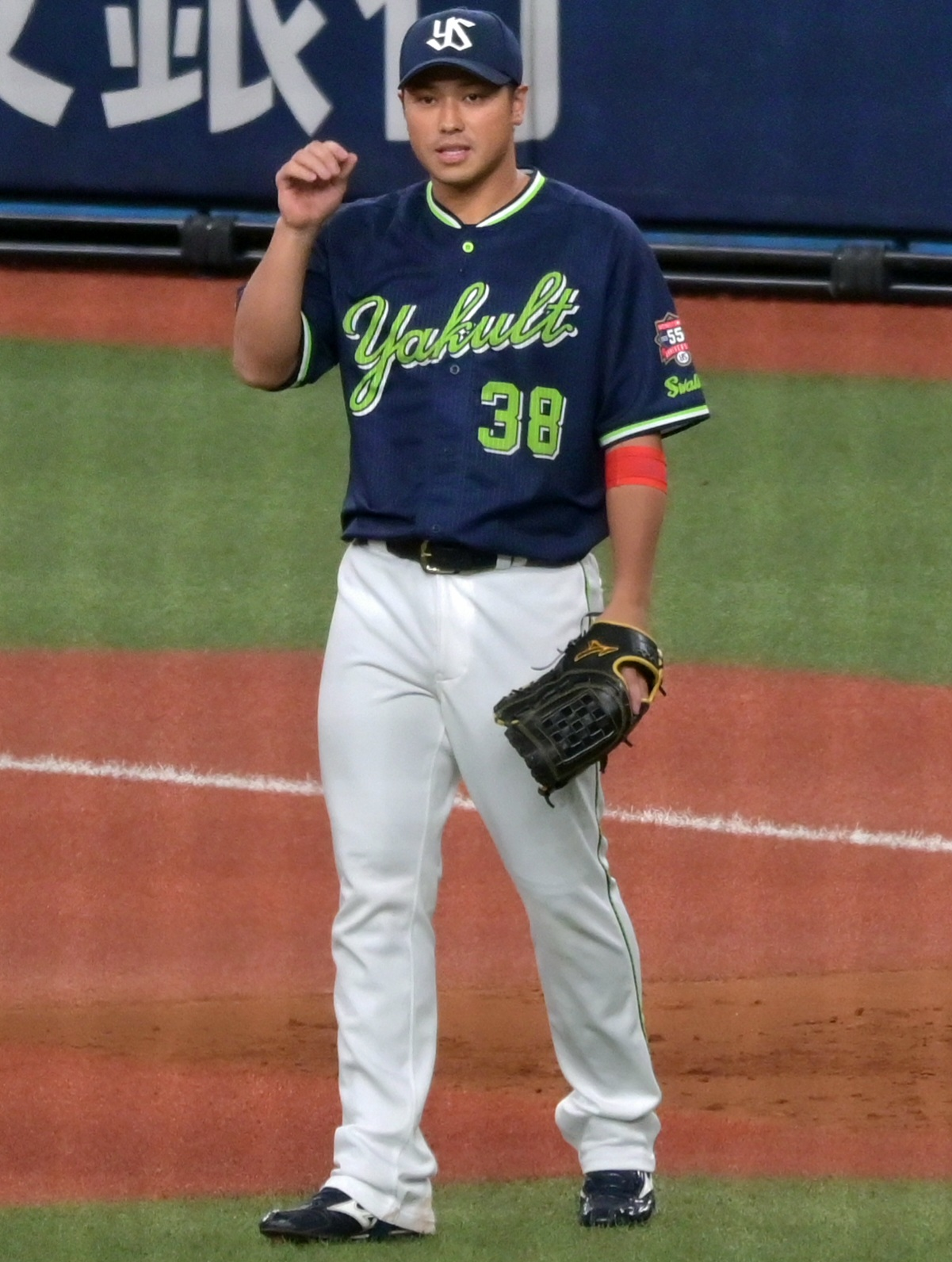
- Infielder
- Born: August 29, 1995 (age 30); Kanazawa, Ishikawa, Japan
- Batted: Right Threw: Right

NPB debut
- July 20, 2017, for the Yomiuri Giants

Last NPB appearance
- September 30, 2025, for the Tokyo Yakult Swallows

Career statistics
- Batting average: .200
- Hits: 83
- Home runs: 10
- RBIs: 33
- Stolen bases: 4
- Stats at Baseball Reference

Teams
- Yomiuri Giants (2018–2023); Tokyo Yakult Swallows (2024–2025)

Takumi Kitamura (北村 拓己, Kitamura Takumi; born August 29, 1995 in Kanazawa, Ishikawa, Japan) is a professional Japanese baseball player. He plays pitcher for the Tokyo Yakult Swallows.
