= Kohei Suzuki (baseball, born 1994) =

Japanese baseball player (born 1994)

Kōhei Suzuki
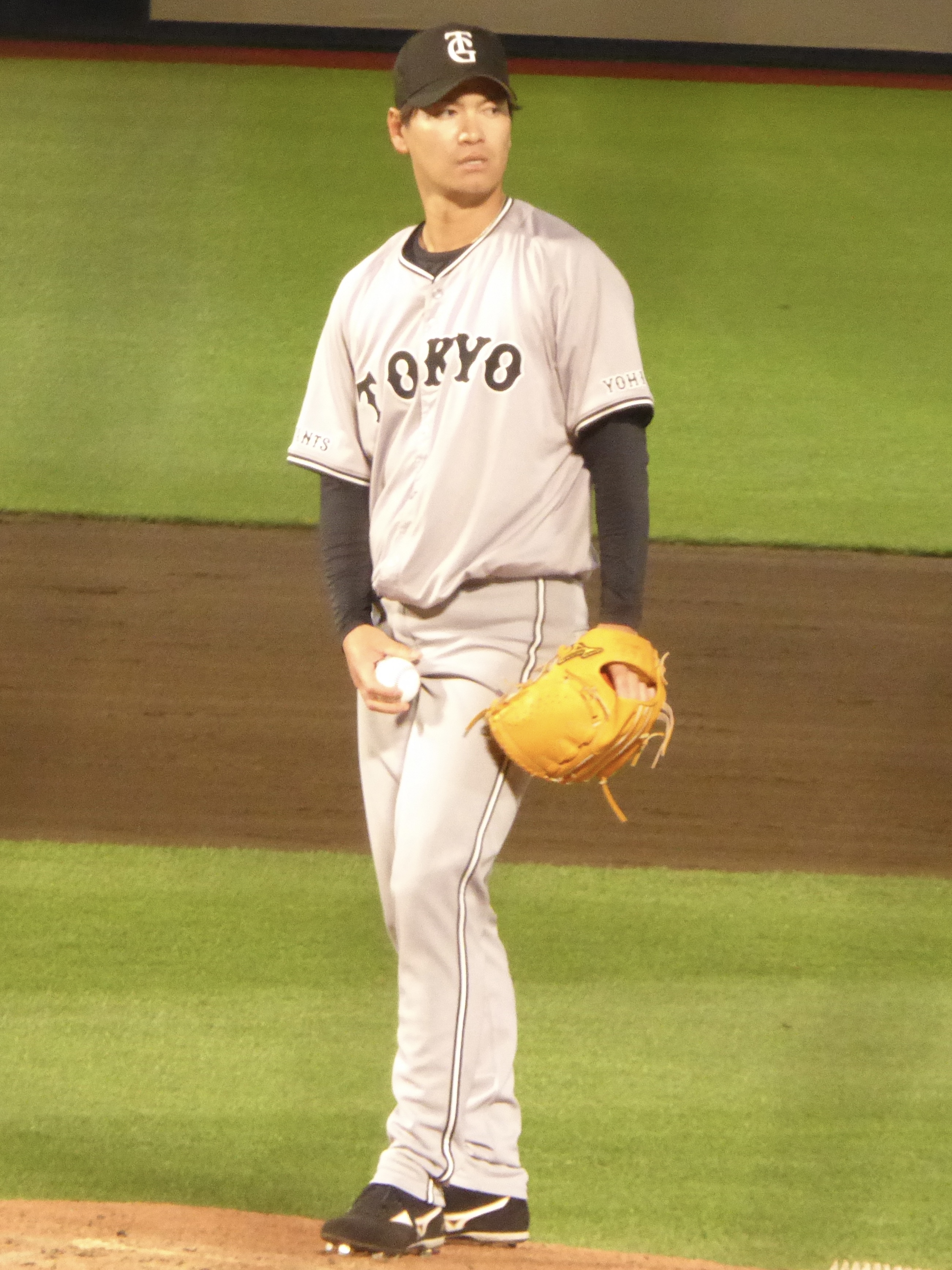
- Suzuki with the Yomiuri Giants
- Pitcher
- Born: January 21, 1994 (age 32); Kamagaya, Chiba, Japan
- Batted: Right Threw: Right

NPB debut
- May 19, 2018, for the Orix Buffaloes

Last NPB appearance
- September 1, 2023, for the Yomiuri Giants

Career statistics
- Win–loss record: 6-10
- Earned Run Average: 5.10
- Strikeouts: 167
- Saves: 2
- Holds: 18
- Stats at Baseball Reference

Teams
- Orix Buffaloes (2018–2023); Yomiuri Giants (2023–2024); Tokyo Yakult Swallows (2025)

Kōhei Suzuki (鈴木 康平, Suzuki Kōhei; born January 21, 1994 in Kamagaya, Chiba, Japan) also known as K-Suzuki is a professional Japanese baseball player. He plays pitcher for the Tokyo Yakult Swallows.
