= Kōsuke Itō (baseball) =

Japanese baseball player (born 2000)

Kōsuke Itō 伊藤康祐
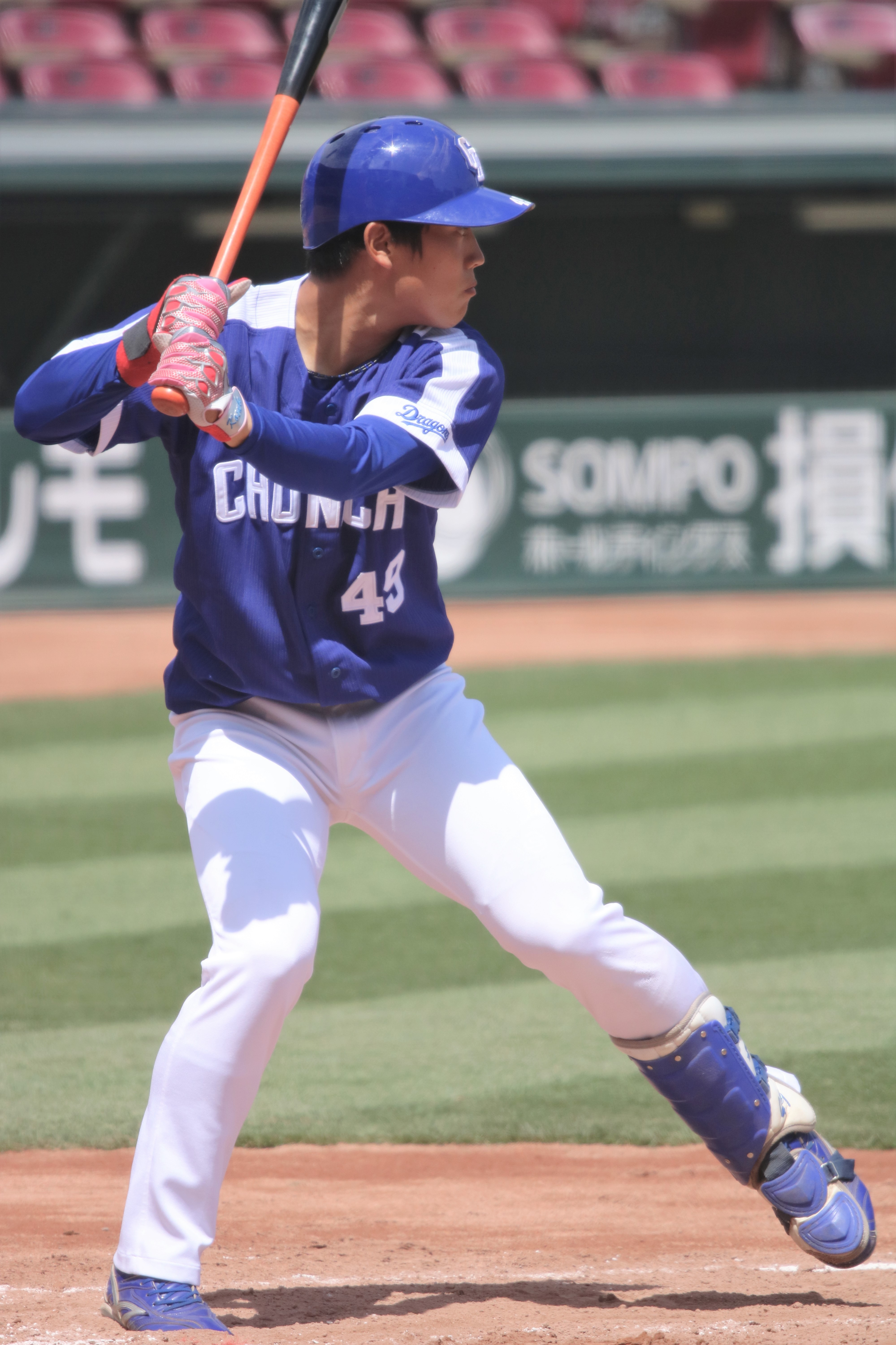
- Outfielder
- Born: February 3, 2000 (age 25); Gamagōri, Aichi, Japan
- Bats: Right Throws: Right

NPB debut
- 2019, for the Chunichi Dragons

NPB statistics (through 2020 season)
- Batting average: .188
- Hits: 6
- Homeruns: 0
- RBIs: 1

Teams
- Chunichi Dragons (2018–2023)

Kōsuke Itō (伊藤康祐, Itō Kōsuke; born February 3, 2000) is a professional Japanese baseball player. He previously played as an outfielder for the Chunichi Dragons.

On 20 October 2017, Itō was selected as the 5th draft pick for the Chunichi Dragons at the 2017 NPB Draft and on 16 November signed a provisional contract with a ¥30,000,000 sign-on bonus and a ¥5,500,000 yearly salary.

Itō is said to admire Fukuoka SoftBank Hawks third-baseman, Nobuhiro Matsuda.
