= Arata Shiino =

Japanese baseball player (born 1995)

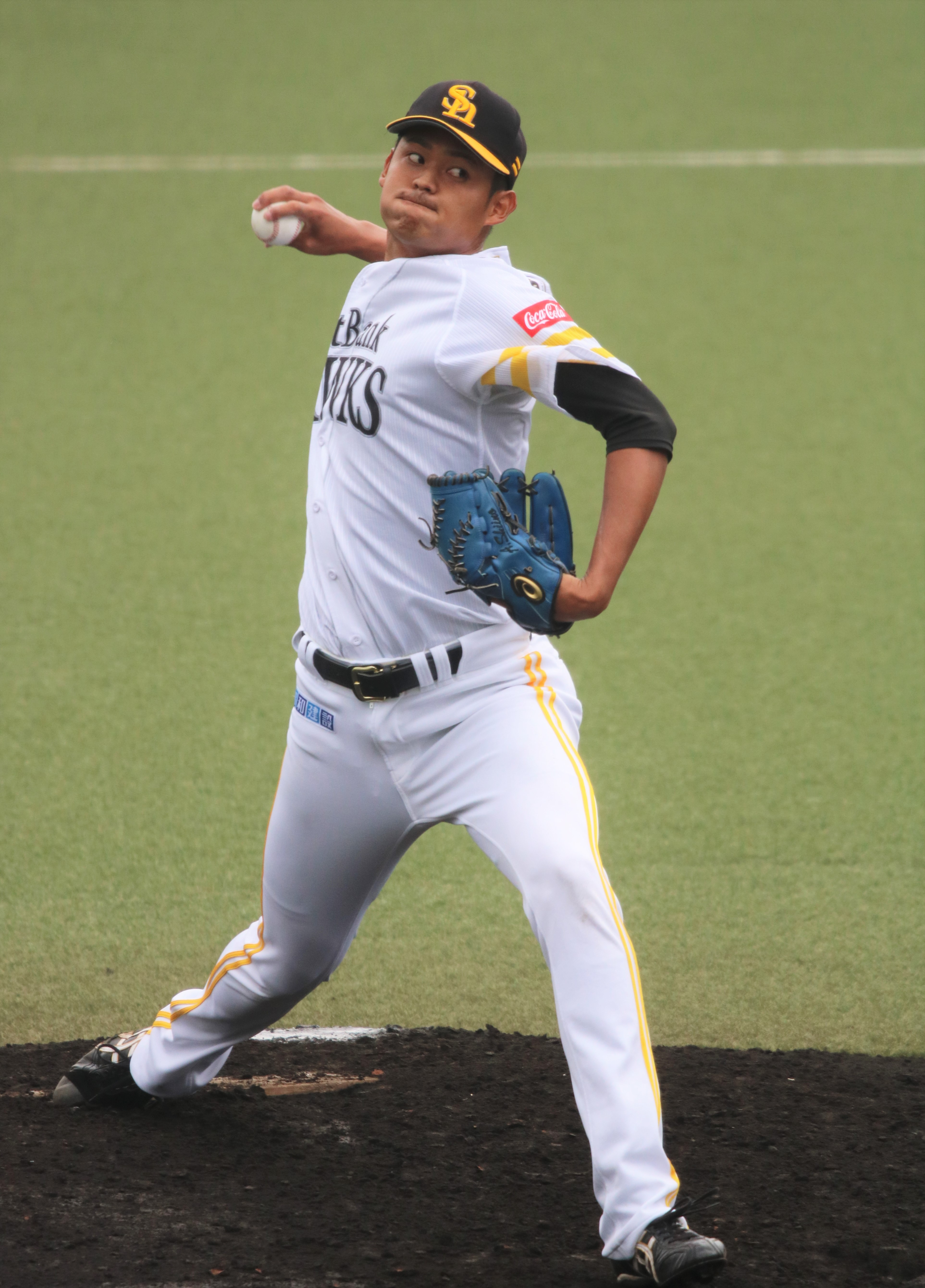
- Shiino with the Fukuoka SoftBank Hawks
- Pitcher
- Born: October 10, 1995 (age 30); Tainai, Niigata, Japan
- Batted: Right Threw: Right

NPB debut
- May 27, 2018, for the Fukuoka SoftBank Hawks

Last NPB appearance
- September 25, 2023, for the Fukuoka SoftBank Hawks

NPB statistics
- Win–loss record: 6-4
- ERA: 3.87
- Strikeouts: 101
- Stats at Baseball Reference

Teams
- Fukuoka SoftBank Hawks (2018-2023)

Career highlights and awards
- 3× Japan Series champion (2018–2020)

Arata Shiino (椎野 新, Shiino Arata; born October 10, 1995) is a Japanese former professional baseball pitcher. He played in Nippon Professional Baseball (NPB) for the Fukuoka SoftBank Hawks from 2018 to 2023.

== Career ==
Shiino played for the Fukuoka SoftBank Hawks of Nippon Professional Baseball from 2018 to 2023.

== Professional career ==
On October 26, 2017, Shiino was drafted by the Fukuoka Softbank Hawks in the 2017 Nippon Professional Baseball draft.

On May 27, 2018, Shiino pitched his debut game against the Tohoku Rakuten Golden Eagles as a relief pitcher. His regular season pitch was only that one game, but he pitched against the Saitama Seibu Lions in the 2018 Pacific League Climax Series in the Postseason. And he was selected as the Japan Series roster in the 2018 Japan Series.

On June 5, 2019, Shiino won the game as a relief pitcher for the first time. In 2019 season, he finished the regular season with a 36 Games pitched, a 5–2 Win–loss record, a 3.13 ERA, a 6 Holds, a 49 strikeouts in 46 innings. And he was selected as the Japan Series roster in the 2019 Japan Series.

In 2020 season, Shiino finished the regular season with a 12 Games pitched, a 1–1 Win–loss record, a 5.73 ERA, a one Hold, a 13 strikeouts in 11 innings. In the 2020 Japan Series against the Yomiuri Giants, He pitched for the first time in the Japan Series in Game 2 and contributed to the team's fourth consecutive Japan Series championship with no runs in bottom of 9th inning.

In 2021 seasons, he never had a chance to pitch in the Pacific League.

On June 7, 2022, Shiino pitched in the First League for the first time in two seasons. In 2022 seasons, he finished the regular season with 18 Games pitched, a 0–0 Win–loss record, a 4.01 ERA, a one holds and a 14 strikeouts in 34 innings.

In 2023 season, Shiino recorded with a 11 Games pitched, a 0–1 Win–loss record, a 3.86 ERA, and a 17 strikeouts in 16.1 innings. On October 22, the Hawks announced release him.

On November 30, 2023, Shiino announced that he would retire as an active player. He is also scheduled to be on the team's staff starting next season.
