= Eito Tanaka =

Japanese baseball player (born 1999)

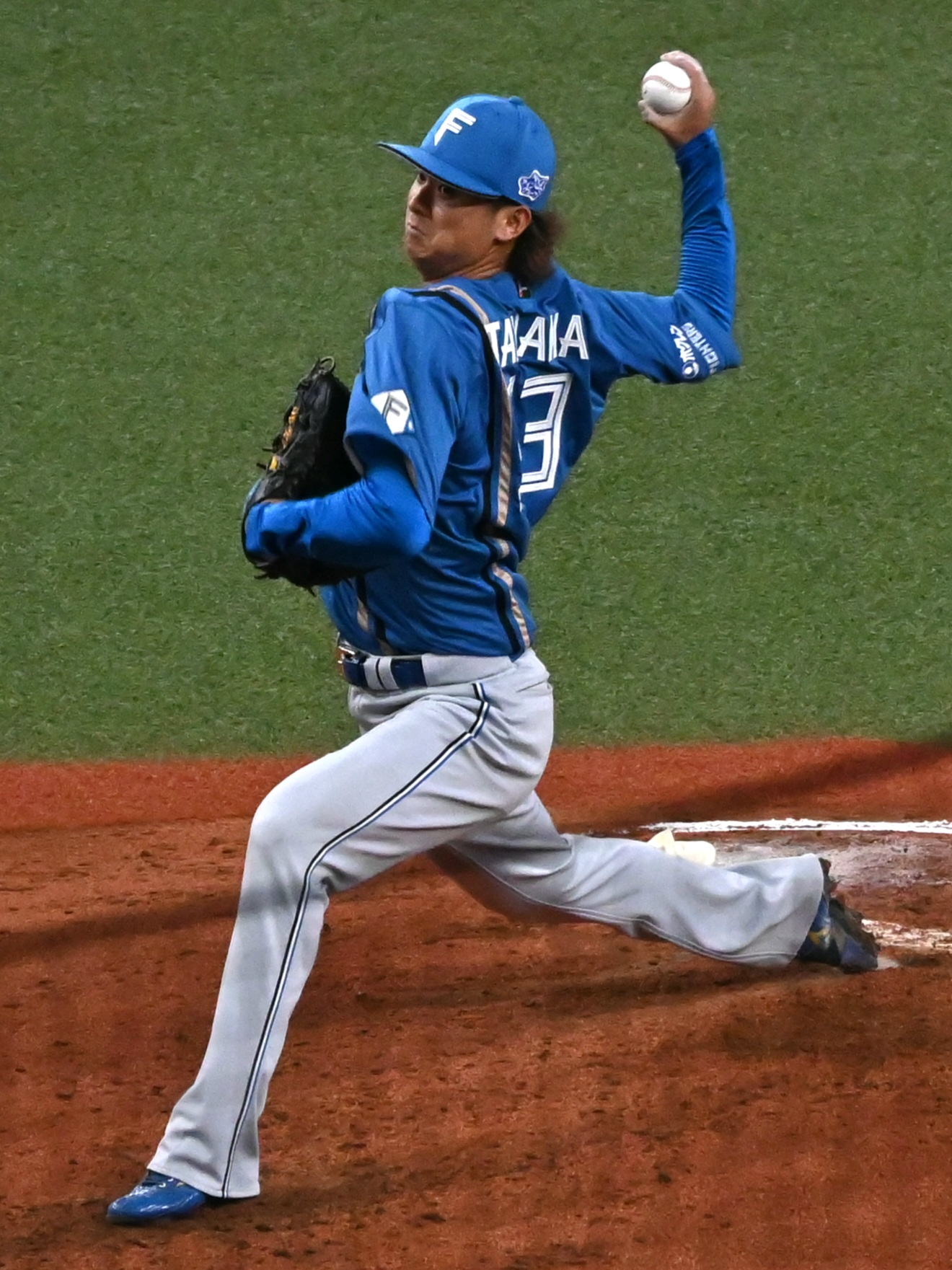

Yomiuri Giants – No. 45
- Pitcher
- Born: July 13, 1999 (age 26); Nakatsu, Ōita, Japan
- Bats: Left Throws: Right

NPB debut
- September 27, 2019, for the Hokkaido Nippon-Ham Fighters

Career statistics (through 2025 season)
- Win–loss record: 2–7
- Earned run average: 3.66
- Strikeouts: 53
- Saves: 0
- Holds: 36

Teams
- Hokkaido Nippon-Ham Fighters (2018–2024); Yomiuri Giants (2025–present)

Eito Tanaka (田中 瑛斗, Tanaka Eito; born July 13, 1999) is a professional Japanese baseball player. He is a pitcher for the Yomiuri Giants of Nippon Professional Baseball (NPB).
