= Atsushi Endoh =

Japanese baseball player (born 1999)

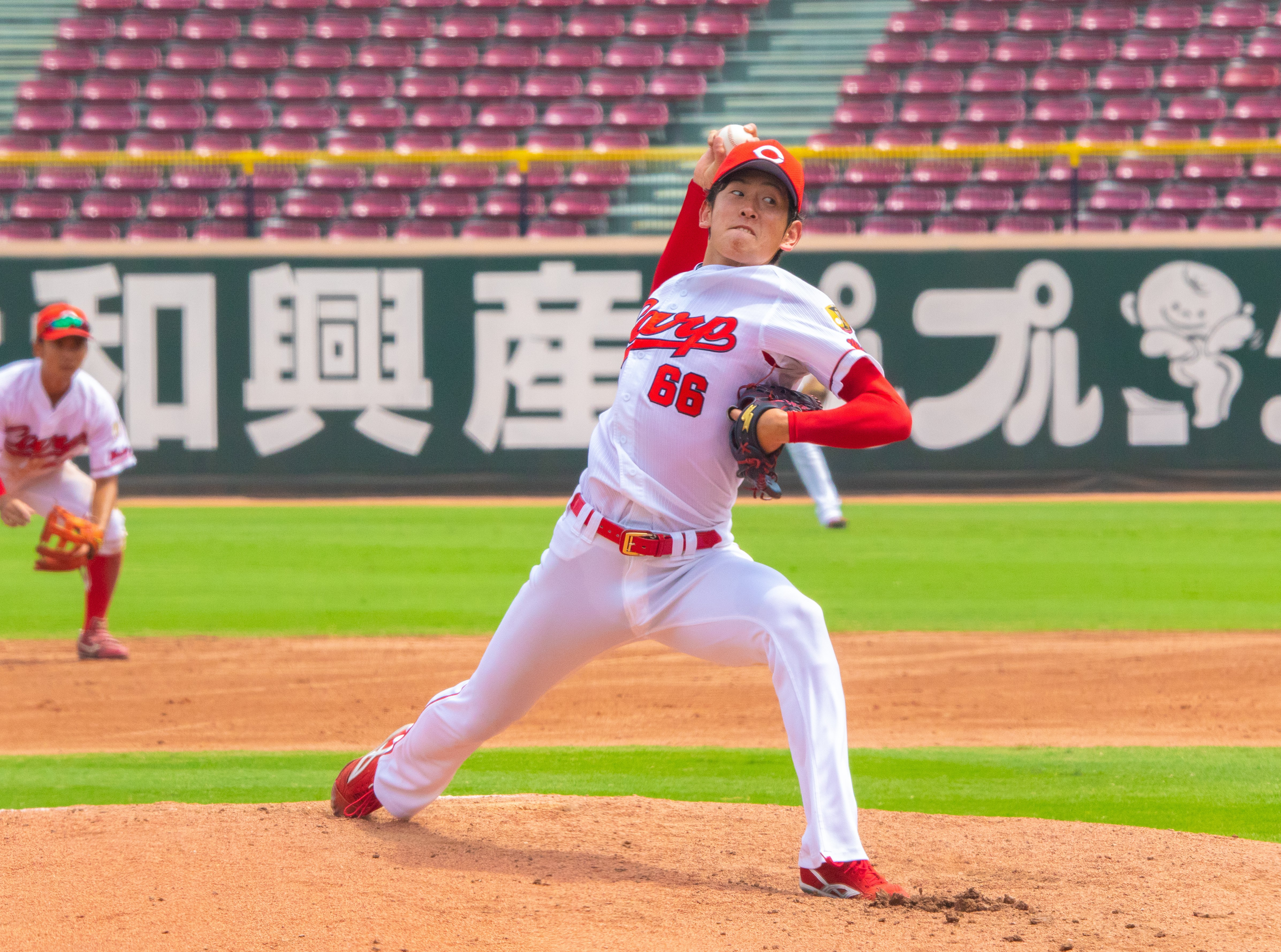

Hiroshima Toyo Carp – No. 66
- Pitcher
- Born: April 8, 1999 (age 27); Tsuchiura, Ibaraki, Japan
- Bats: Right Throws: Right

NPB debut
- June 7, 2019, for the Hiroshima Toyo Carp

Career statistics (through 2022 season)
- Win–loss record: 10–14
- Earned run average: 3.71
- Strikeouts: 224
- Saves: 1
- Holds: 6
- Stats at Baseball Reference

Teams
- Hiroshima Toyo Carp (2019–present)

Atsushi Endoh (遠藤 淳志, Endoh Atsushi; born April 8, 1999) is a professional Japanese baseball player. He is a pitcher for the Hiroshima Toyo Carp of Nippon Professional Baseball (NPB).
