= Yūma Ohshita =

Japanese baseball player (born 1992)

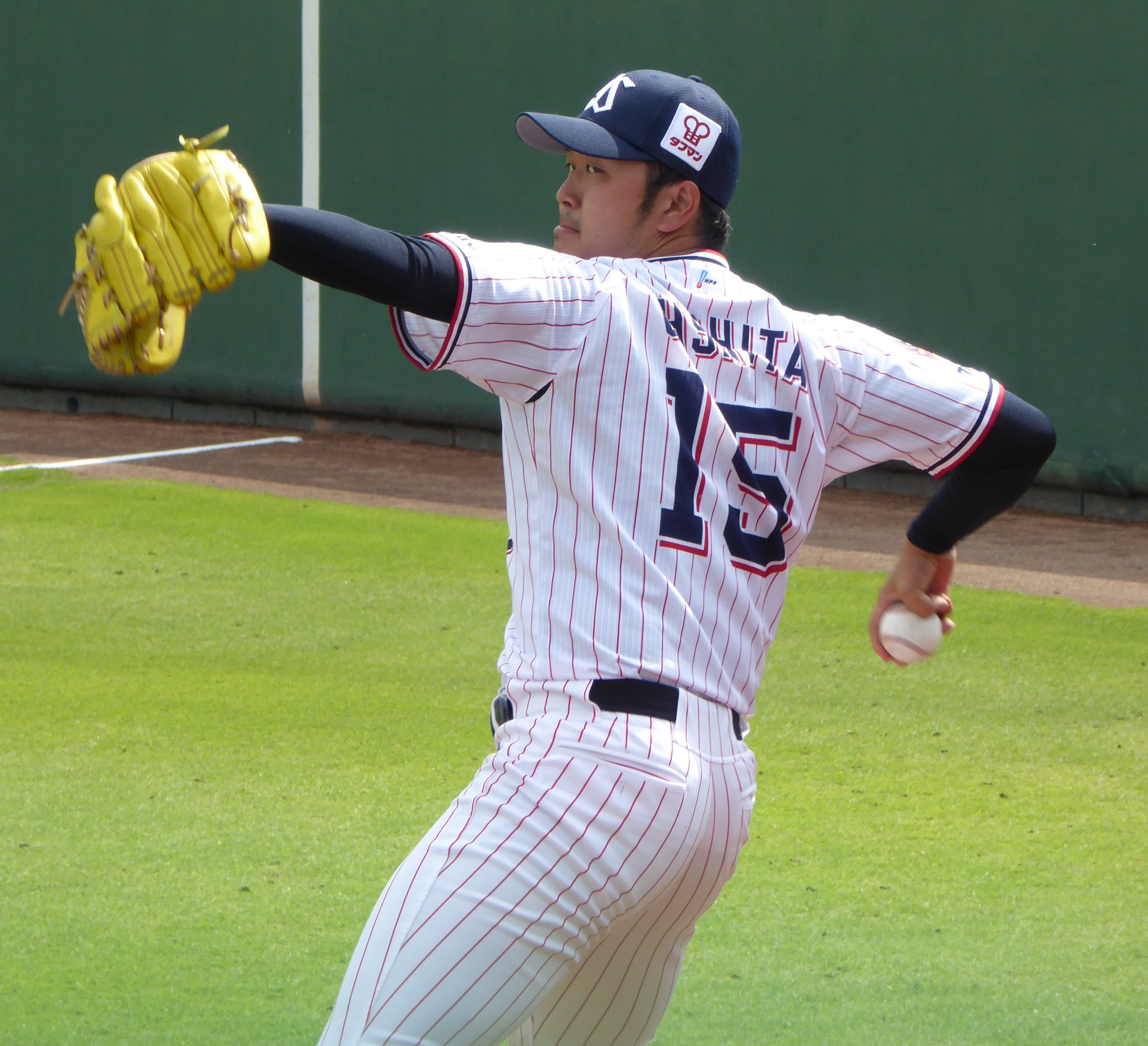
- Ohshita with the Tokyo Yakult Swallows
- Pitcher
- Born: July 6, 1992 (age 33); Hiroshima, Hiroshima, Japan
- Batted: Left Threw: Right

NPB debut
- June 23, 2018, for the Tokyo Yakult Swallows

Last NPB appearance
- April 24, 2022, for the Tokyo Yakult Swallows

NPB statistics
- Win–loss: 3-4
- ERA: 4.17
- Strikeouts: 118
- Stats at Baseball Reference

Teams
- Tokyo Yakult Swallows (2018–2023)

Yūma Ohshita (大下 佑馬, Ohshita Yūma; born July 6, 1992 in Hiroshima, Hiroshima, Japan) is a Japanese former professional baseball player. He played pitcher for the Tokyo Yakult Swallows from 2018 to 2023.
