= Manaya Nishikawa =

Japanese baseball player (born 1999)

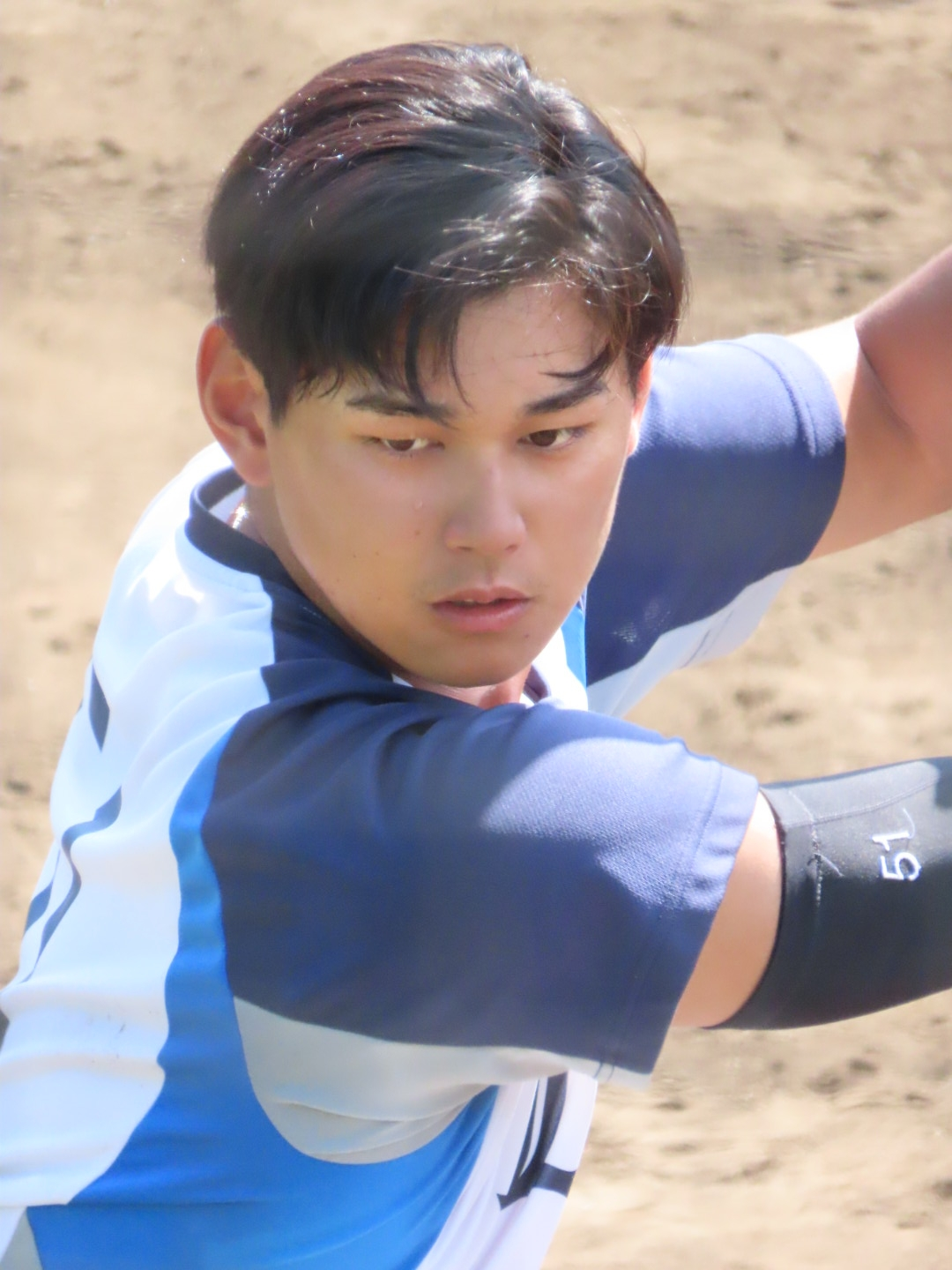

Saitama Seibu Lions – No. 51
- Outfielder
- Born: June 10, 1999 (age 26); Sakai, Osaka, Japan
- Bats: Left Throws: Right

NPB debut
- August 16, 2020, for the Saitama Seibu Lions

NPB statistics (through 2025 season)
- Batting average: .235
- Home runs: 17
- Runs batted in: 81
- Stolen base: 38
- Stats at Baseball Reference

Teams
- Saitama Seibu Lions (2018–present)

Career highlights and awards
- NPB All-Star (2025)

Manaya Nishikawa (西川 愛也, Nishikawa Manaya; born June 10, 1999) is a Japanese professional baseball outfielder for the Saitama Seibu Lions of Nippon Professional Baseball (NPB).
