= Akihiro Wakabayashi =

Japanese baseball player (born 1993)

Akihiro Wakabayashi 若林 晃弘
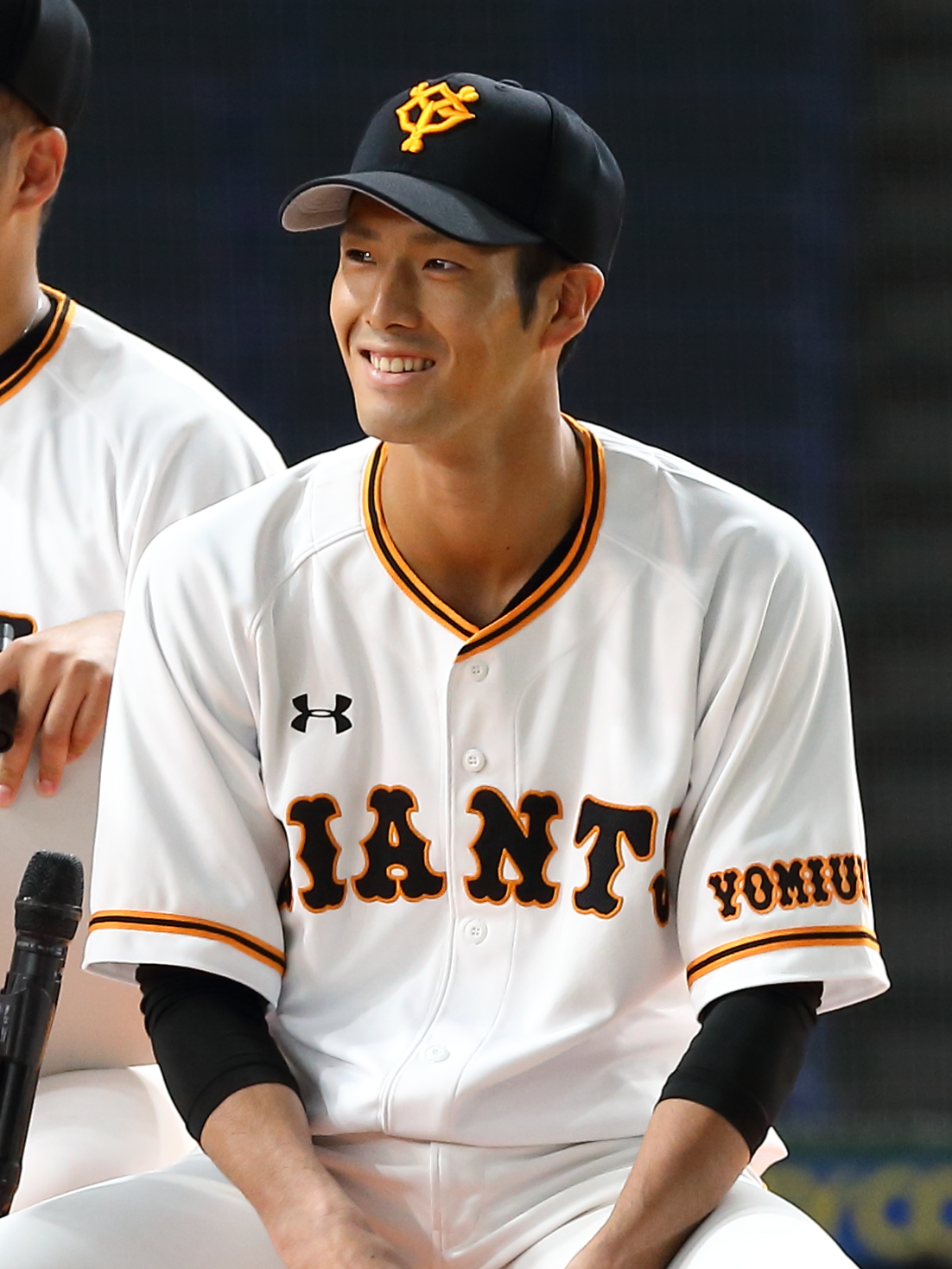
- Wakabayashi with the Yomiuri Giants

Yomiuri Giants
- Infielder/Coach
- Born: August 26, 1993 (age 32); Nakano, Tokyo, Japan
- Batted: Both Threw: Right

NPB debut
- May 12, 2018, for the Yomiuri Giants

Last NPB appearance
- April 30, 2025, for the Hokkaido Nippon-Ham Fighters

Career statistics (through 2025 season)
- Batting average: .228
- Home runs: 12
- RBI: 59
- Hits: 163
- Stolen bases: 15
- Stats at Baseball Reference

Teams
- As player: Yomiuri Giants (2018–2023); Hokkaido Nippon-Ham Fighters (2024–2025); As coach: Yomiuri Giants (2026–present)

Akihiro Wakabayashi (若林 晃弘, Wakabayashi Akihiro; born August 26, 1993, in Nakano, Tokyo, Japan) is a professional Japanese baseball player. He plays infielder for the Hokkaido Nippon-Ham Fighters.
