= Yudai Fujioka =

Japanese baseball player (born 1993)

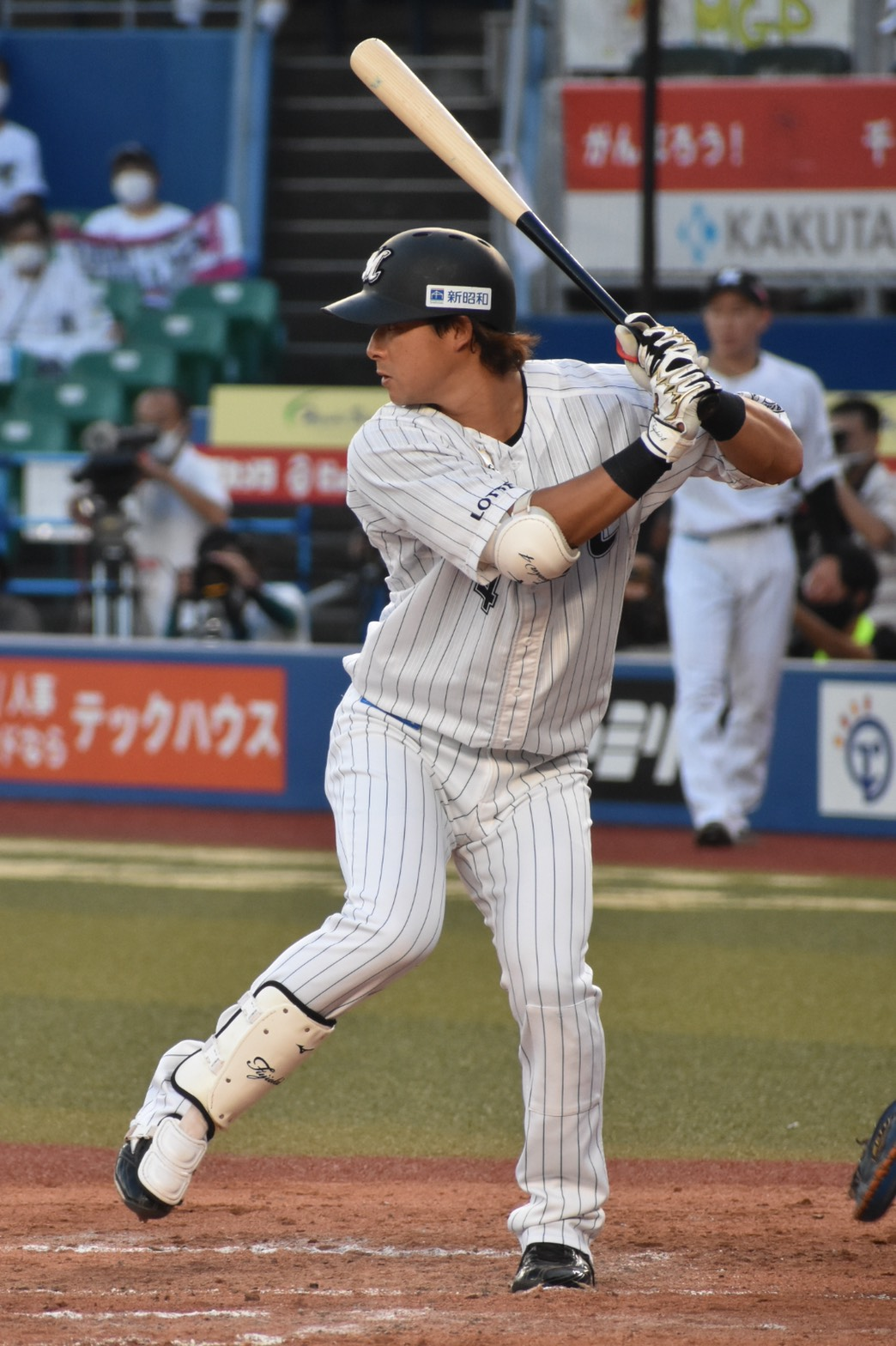

Chiba Lotte Marines – No. 7
- Infielder
- Born: August 8, 1993 (age 33); Okayama, Okayama, Japan
- Bats: Left Throws: Right

debut
- March 30, 2018, for the Chiba Lotte Marines

NPB statistics (through 2021 season)
- Batting average: .242
- Hits: 371
- Home runs: 14
- Runs batted in: 133
- Sacrifice bunt: 70
- Stolen base: 35
- Stats at Baseball Reference

Teams
- Chiba Lotte Marines (2018–present)

Yudai Fujioka (藤岡 裕大, Fujioka Yūdai; born August 8, 1993 in Okayama, Okayama Prefecture) is a professional Japanese baseball player. He plays infielder for the Chiba Lotte Marines.
