= Naoki Matsumoto =

Japanese baseball player (born 1998)

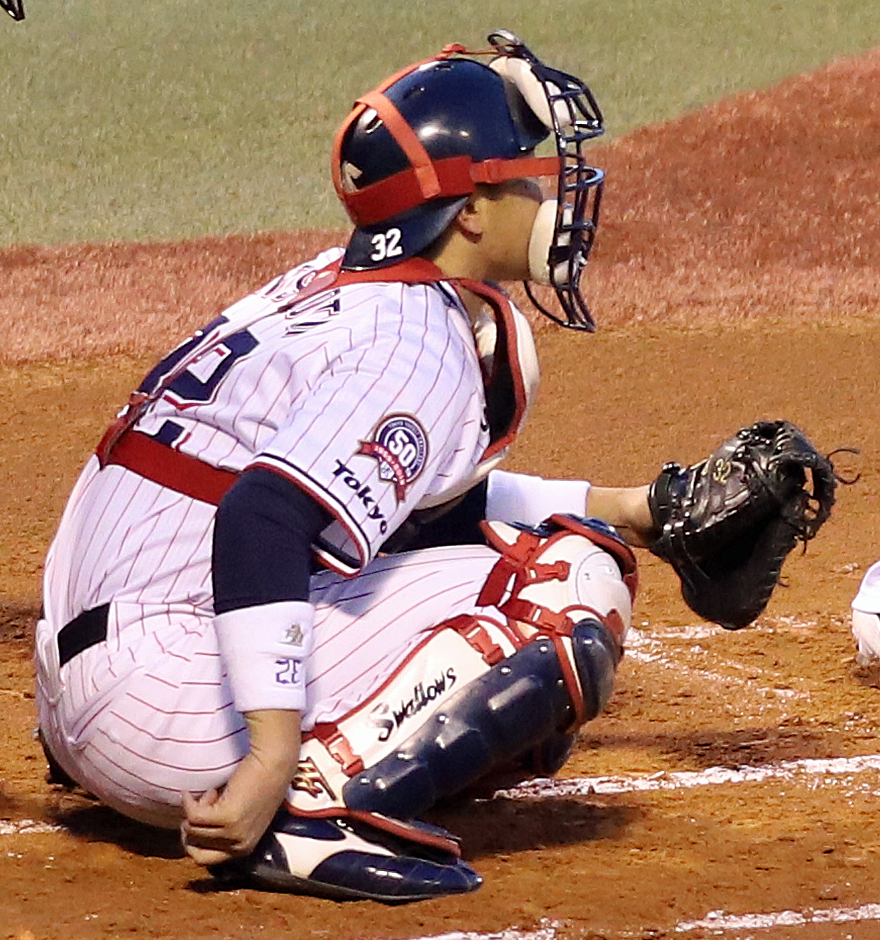

Tokyo Yakult Swallows – No. 32
- Catcher
- Born: October 17, 1993 (age 32); Sakaide, Kagawa, Japan
- Bats: Right Throws: Right

NPB debut
- April 25, 2018, for the Tokyo Yakult Swallows

Career statistics (through 2024 season)
- Batting average: .234
- Hits: 57
- Home runs: 4
- RBIs: 20
- Stolen bases: 1
- Stats at Baseball Reference

Teams
- Tokyo Yakult Swallows (2018–present)

Naoki Matsumoto (松本 直樹, Matsumoto Naoki; born August 7, 1998 in Sakaide, Kagawa, Japan) is a professional Japanese baseball player. He plays catcher for the Tokyo Yakult Swallows.
