= Okayama Shoka University =

Private university in Okayama, Honshu, Japan

Coordinates: 34°41′00″N 133°54′04″E

- 岡山商科大学 (Japanese)
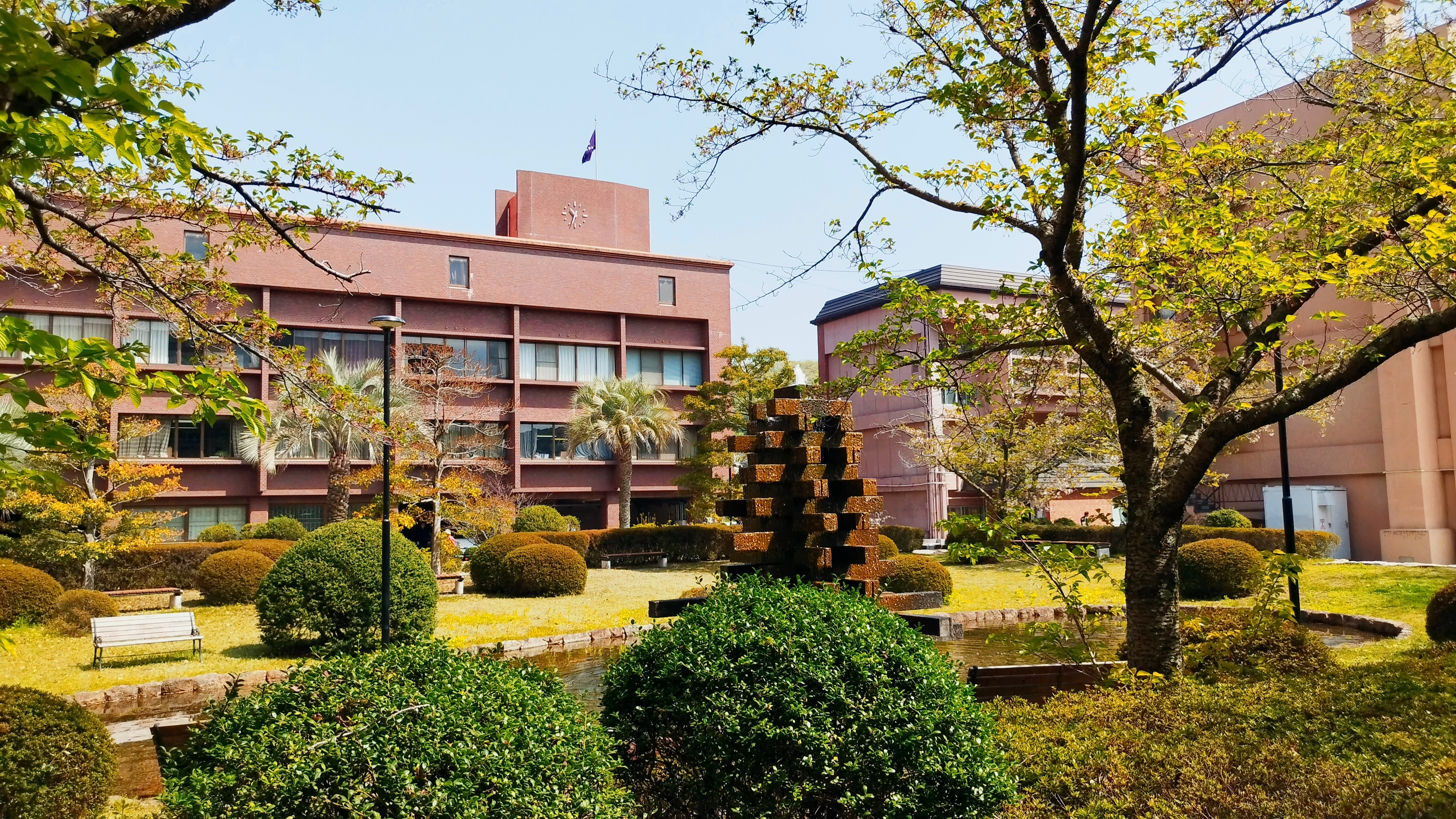
- Former names: Kibi Commercial School_{吉備商業学校}(1911–1947); Kibi High School_{吉備高等学校}(1948–1954); Kibi Commercial Junior College_{吉備商科短期大学}(1955–1964)
- Motto: A university in harmony with the community
- Type: Private
- Established: Founded 1911; Chartered 1965
- Academic affiliations: Consortium-Okayama (大学コンソーシアム岡山)
- President: Dr.Akio IJIRI
- Academic staff: Faculty of Law; Faculty of Economics; Faculty of Management
- Students: 1786 (2023)
- Undergraduates: 1760 (2023)
- Postgraduates: 26 (2023)
- Location: JPN〒700−0087; Kita-Ku, Okayama, Japan
- Campus: Tsushima
- Colours: Crimson
- Website: osu.ac.jp
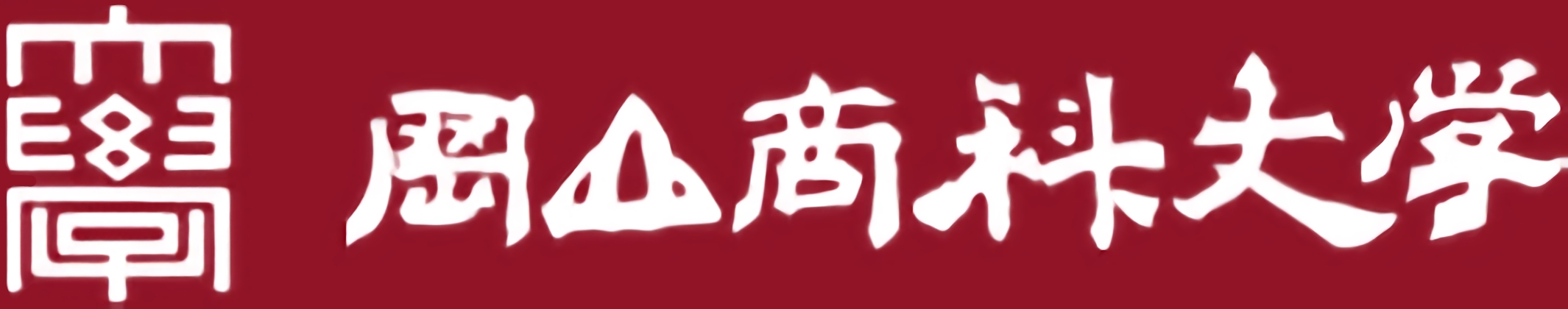

Okayama Shoka University (岡山商科大学, Okayama shōka daigaku) is a private university in Tsushimakyomachi 2-10-1, Kita-Ku, Okayama, Honshu, Japan. The predecessor of the school was founded in 1911, and it was chartered as a university in 1965. The abbreviations are Shodai, Okasho, or OSU. Okayama Shoka University is a comprehensive social sciences university with three faculties: Faculty of Law, Faculty of Economics, and Faculty of Management (Department of Management and Department of Commerce).
