= Yukinori Kishida =

Japanese baseball player (born 1996)

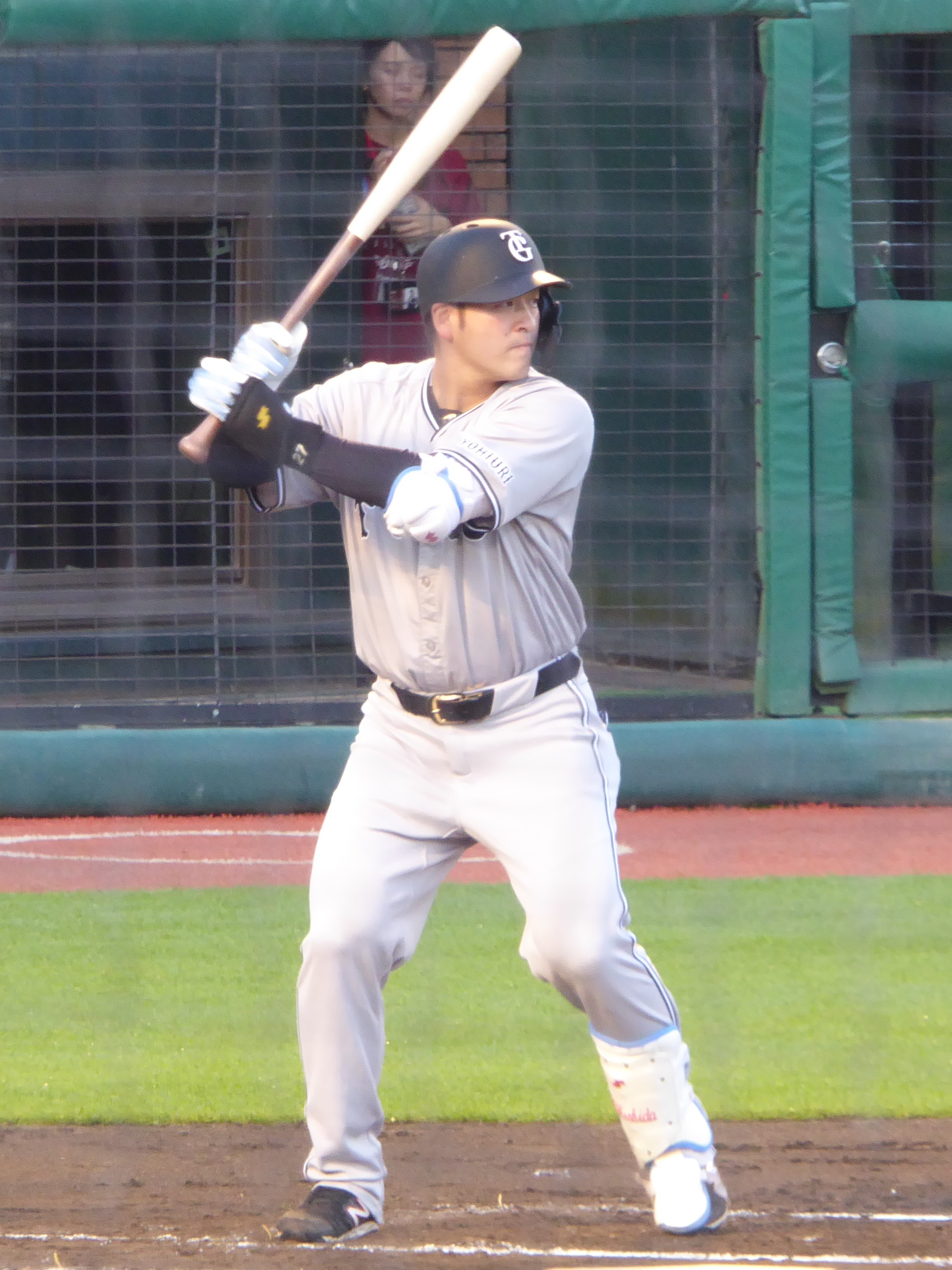
- Kishida with the Yomiuri Giants

Yomiuri Giants – No. 27
- Catcher
- Born: October 10, 1996 (age 29); Kawanishi, Hyōgo, Japan
- Bats: Right Throws: Right

NPB debut
- August 3, 2019, for the Yomiuri Giants

NPB statistics (through 2025 season)
- Batting average: .262
- Home runs: 15
- RBI: 76
- Hits: 186
- Stolen base: 2
- Sacrifice bunt: 17

Teams
- Yomiuri Giants (2019–present)

Yukinori Kishida (岸田 行倫, Kishida Yukinori; born October 10, 1996) is a professional Japanese baseball player. He plays catcher for the Yomiuri Giants.
