= Tokushima Indigo Socks =

Japanese professional baseball team

Logo and character

The Tokushima Indigo Socks (徳島インディゴソックス, Tokushima Indigo Sokkusu) are a baseball team in the Shikoku Island League plus of Japan. Established in 2005, the Indigo Socks mainly play their home games at Tokushima prefecture Kuramoto stadium in Tokushima, Tokushima Prefecture.

They won the 2011, 2013, 2014 2017 and 2019 season titles by beating other teams in the Island League playoff. They also won 2020 season title(Playoff was not held, because Covid19).

Former MLB pitcher Kazuhito Tadano temporarily played for them in September and October 2006.

Their mascot's name is Spider, スパイダー in Japanese.
