= 2026 Central League Climax Series =

Japanese baseball series

First stage
Team (Wins)		Manager	Season
Yokohama DeNA BayStars (2)		Ryoji Aikawa	71–69–3 (.507), 7½ GB
Yomiuri Giants (0)		Hideki Hashigami	76–64–3 (.543), 2½ GB
- Dates: October 10–11

Final stage
Team (Wins)		Manager	Season
Hanshin Tigers (1)		Kyuji Fujikawa	79–62–2 (.560), 2½ GA
Yokohama DeNA BayStars (4)		Ryoji Aikawa	71–69–3 (.507), 7½ GB
- Dates: October 14–17

The 2026 Central League Climax Series was a set of consecutive playoff series between the three top-placing teams in Nippon Professional Baseball's Central League (CL). The first stage will started on October 10 and the final stage concluded on October 17. The first stage was a best-of-three series between the second-place Yomiuri Giants and the third-place Yokohama DeNA BayStars. The final stage was a best-of-six series with the Hanshin Tigers, the CL champion, being awarded a one-win advantage against the eventual winner of the first stage. Yokohama DeNA Baystars won the series and advanced to the 2026 Japan Series to compete against the Fukuoka SoftBank Hawks who won the 2026 Pacific League Climax Series.

== Background ==
For the sixth year in a row, JERA is sponsoring the naming rights for the Central League Climax Series, and it is officially known as the "2026 JERA Climax Series SE".

The Central League (CL) seeding was not set until the very last day, October 3, of the regular season, while the BayStars were locked in 3-seed on September 26. On October 3, the Giants were still in the race of clinching the CL Championship, and the Tigers lost earlier that day to Hiroshima Toyo Carp. However, the Giants later lost their final game against the BayStars, and thus they lost the championship to the Tigers and the seeding are locked, with Tigers the 1-seed, Giants the 2-seed, and the BayStars the 3-seed. For the BayStars, on the day they were locked in 3-seed, they were two games above .500 and 7½ games behind the Tigers. They won two of their remaining four games, finishing their season with a .507 record with 7½ games behind the Tigers and preventing the league winner from gaining the two-game advantage in the final stage of CL Climax Series, a new rule added this year for the Climax Series.

== First stage ==
=== Summary ===
DeNA won the series, 2–0.

Game	Date	Score	Location	Time	Attendance
1	October 10	Yokohama DeNA BayStars – 2, Yomiuri Giants – 1	Tokyo Dome	2:37	42,232
2	October 11	Yokohama DeNA BayStars – 4, Yomiuri Giants – 1	Tokyo Dome	3:01	42,248

=== Game 1 ===
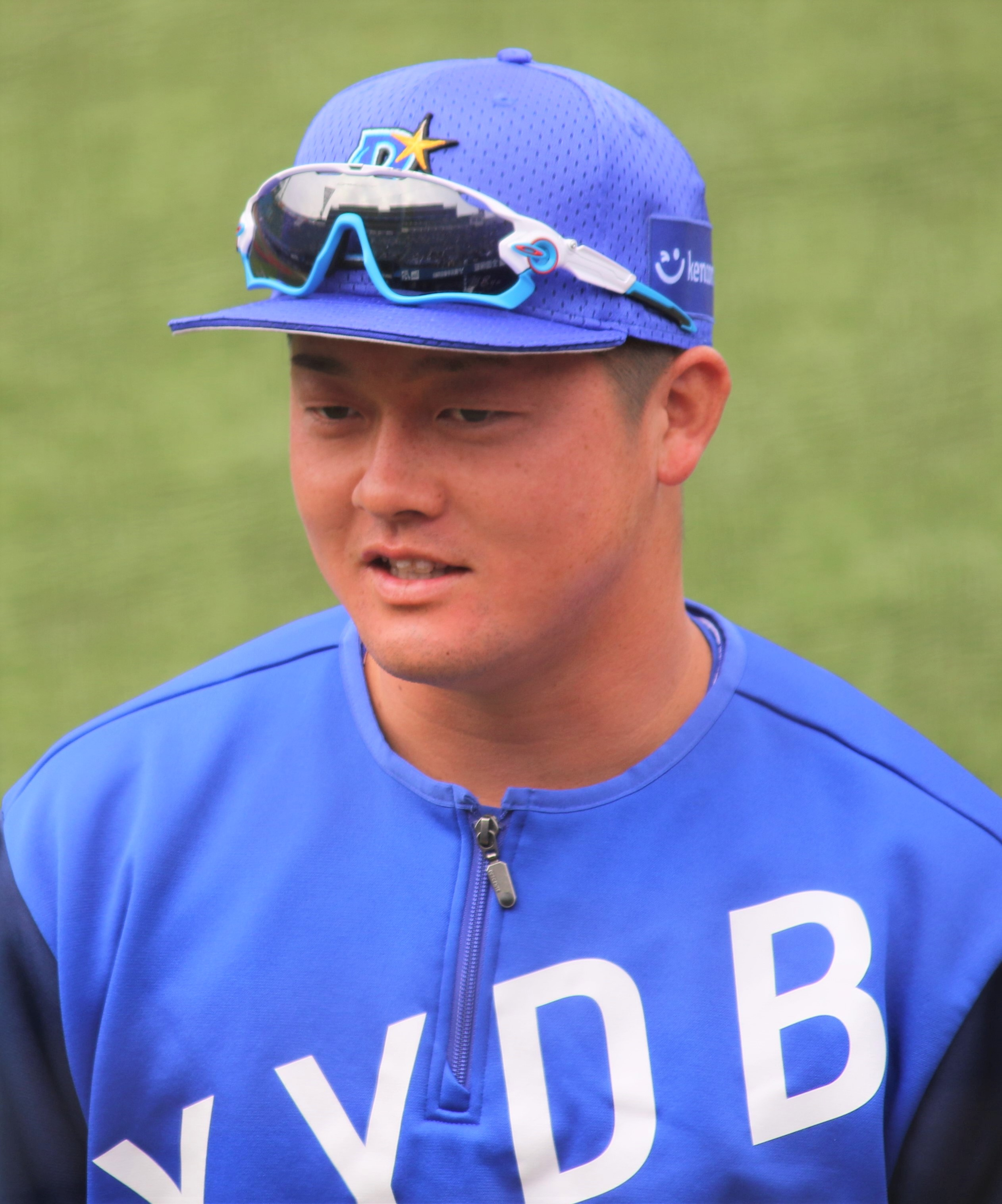
Shugo Maki hit two home runs in the series, one in the first inning of Game 1, and the other in the eighth inning of Game 2.

Saturday, October 10, 2026, 2:00 pm (JST) at Tokyo Dome in Bunkyō, Tokyo
Team	1	2	3	4	5	6	7	8	9	R	H	E
DeNA	1	0	0	0	0	0	0	0	1	2	4	0
Yomiuri	1	0	0	0	0	0	0	0	0	1	6	0
WP: Masumi Hamachi (1–0) LP: Raidel Martínez (0–1) Sv: Sean Reynolds (1); Home runs: DNA: Shugo Maki (1), Ryuki Watarai (1); YOM: None; Attendance: 42,232

In the first inning, the BayStars took an early lead with Shugo Maki's solo home run, however the lead is immediately erased by the Giants in the bottom frame. Naoki Yoshikawa hit a leadoff double to the left, then advanced to third with Go Matsumoto's sacrifice bunt, and scored on Yūta Izuguchi's ground ball to the second base. After the first inning, both teams did not score in the next seven innings.

Katsuki Azuma started Game 1 for the BayStars, while Haruto Inoue started for the Giants. Azuma pitched seven innings, with two strikeouts, allowed 5 hits, including a double by Yoshikawa, and gave up one run. Haruto Inoue, on the other hand, pitched eight innings, with 10 strikeouts, allowed three hits, including a solo home run by Maki. Both teams did not allow a walk throughout the game.

Masumi Hamachi pitched the 1-2-3 inning in the bottom of the eighth, and Ryuki Watarai broke the tie with the solo home run in the very next frame. In the bottom of the ninth, Matsumoto hit a double to the left, but Sean Reynolds retired the next three batters, securing the win for the BayStars.

=== Game 2 ===
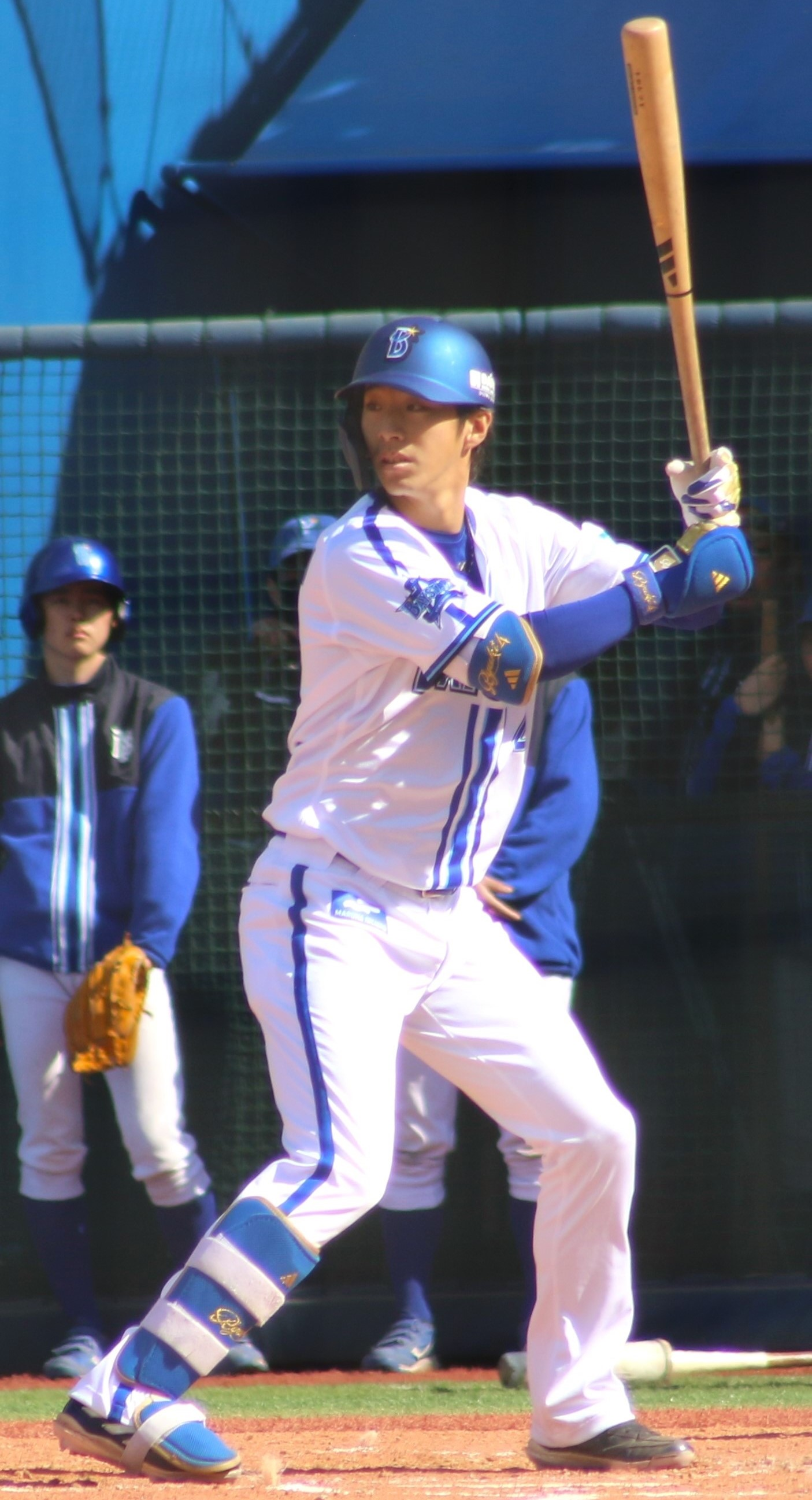
Ryuki Watarai hit two home runs in the series, one in the ninth inning of Game 1, and the other in the first inning of Game 2.

Sunday, October 11, 2026, 2:00 pm (JST) at Tokyo Dome in Bunkyō, Tokyo
Team	1	2	3	4	5	6	7	8	9	R	H	E
DeNA	2	0	0	0	0	0	1	1	0	4	9	0
Yomiuri	0	0	0	1	0	0	0	0	0	1	5	0
WP: Yutaro Ishida (1–0) LP: Kazuyuki Takemaru (0–1) Sv: Sean Reynolds (2); Home runs: DNA: Ryuki Watarai (2), Shugo Maki (2); YOM: Bobby Dalbec (1); Attendance: 42,248

The BayStars once again took an early lead with a solo home run in the first inning, this time by Ryuki Watarai. In the same frame, Shugo Maki, batting after Watarai, hit a double to the center, and later scored on Keita Sano's RBI single to the right. In the bottom frame, Naoki Yoshikawa once again hit a leadoff double, and advance to third on Yūta Izuguchi's single. Yoshikawa was ultimately stranded with Takumi Ohshiro's ground ball to first that resulted in a inning-ending double play.

Bobby Dalbec hit a solo home run in the bottom of the fourth inning, scoring the only run for the Giants in this game. In the seventh inning, Sano hit a leadoff double, then scored on Yasutaka Tobashira's RBI single. In the next inning, Maki hit his second home run of the series, scoring the fourth run for the BayStars.

With Sean Reynolds striking out the side in the ninth inning, the BayStars completed the sweep and advanced to the Final Stage.

== Final stage ==
=== Summary ===
DeNA won the series, 4–1*.

Game	Date	Score	Location	Time	Attendance
1	October 14	Yokohama DeNA BayStars – 2, Hanshin Tigers – 0	Koshien Stadium	3:11	42,645
2	October 15	Yokohama DeNA BayStars – 1, Hanshin Tigers – 0	Koshien Stadium	2:55	42,643
3	October 16	Yokohama DeNA BayStars – 4, Hanshin Tigers – 0	Koshien Stadium	2:48	42,644
4	October 17	Yokohama DeNA BayStars – 8, Hanshin Tigers – 5	Koshien Stadium	3:54	42,648

*The Central League regular season champion is given a one-game advantage in the final stage.

=== Game 1 ===
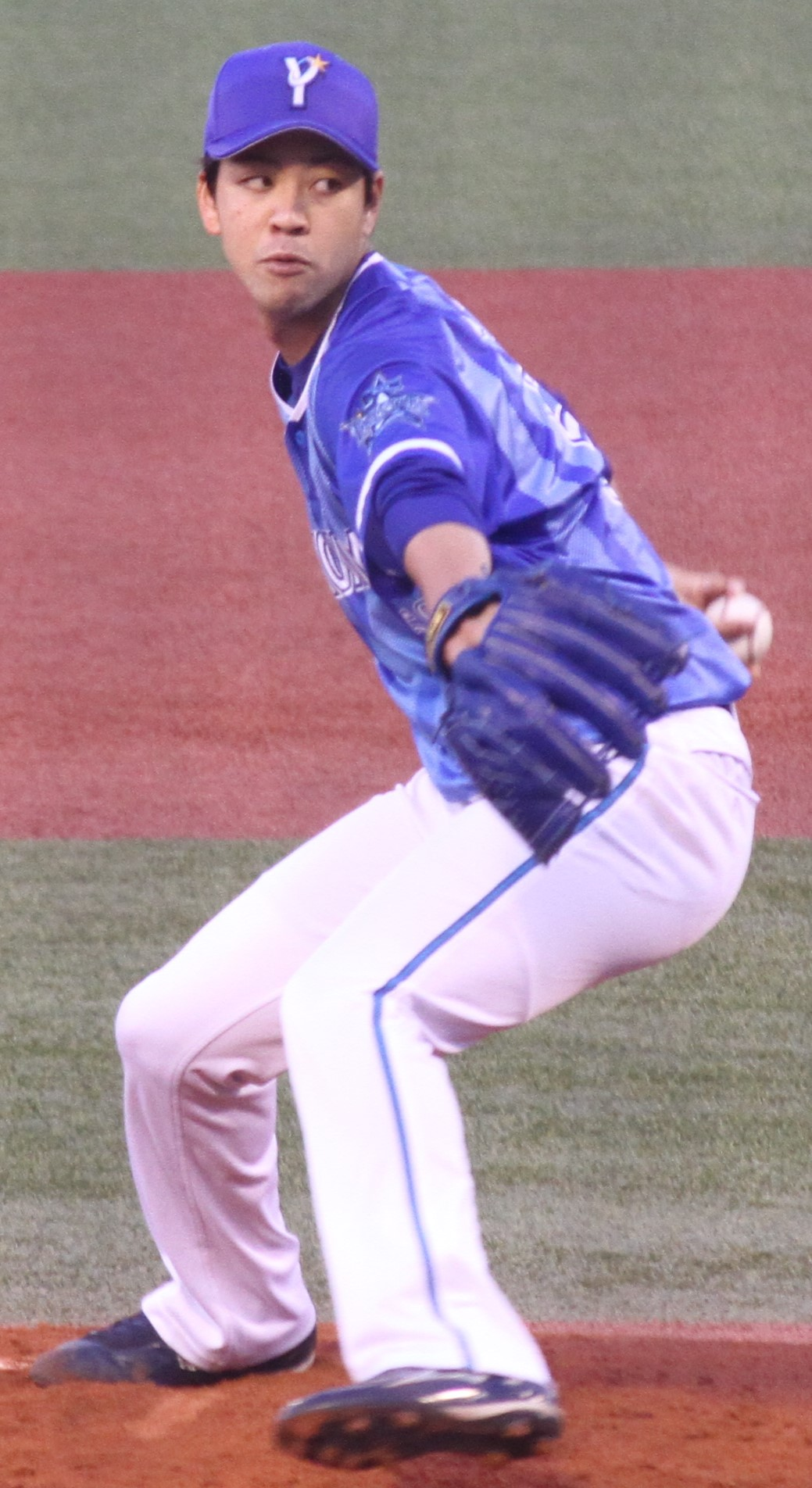
Kentarō Taira, the starting pitcher in Game 1.

Wednesday, October 14, 2026, 6:01 pm (JST) at Koshien Stadium in Nishinomiya, Hyogo
Team	1	2	3	4	5	6	7	8	9	R	H	E
DeNA	1	0	0	0	0	1	0	0	0	2	3	1
Hanshin	0	0	0	0	0	0	0	0	0	0	7	1
WP: Kentarō Taira (1–0) LP: Shoki Murakami (0–1) Sv: Sean Reynolds (1); Home runs: DNA: Keita Sano (1); HAN: None; Attendance: 42,645; Boxscore

In the first inning with one out, the BayStars had two runners on base with back-to-back walks. Shugo Maki on second base scored on Toshiro Miyazaki's RBI single. In the sixth inning, the BayStars scored their second run of the game with a home run by Keita Sano.

Five pitchers of the BayStars threw a combined shutout. The starting pitcher Kentarō Taira threw 5 2/3 with six strikeouts, two walks, and allowed three hits, including a double by Yusuke Oyama. Masaki Iwata recorded one out by getting the last out of the six inning, then Hiromu Ise and Masumi Hamachi threw one shutout inning each, with Ise allowing two singles in the seventh and Hamachi throwing a 1-2-3 eighth inning. In the bottom of the ninth, Sean Reynolds allowed two singles at the start of the inning, but retired the next three batters, completing the shutout and secure the first win for the BayStars, tying the series.

Shoki Murakami started for the Tigers in Game 1. He pitched six innings with five strikeouts, two walks, allowed three hits, including the home run by Sano, and gave up two runs.

=== Game 2 ===
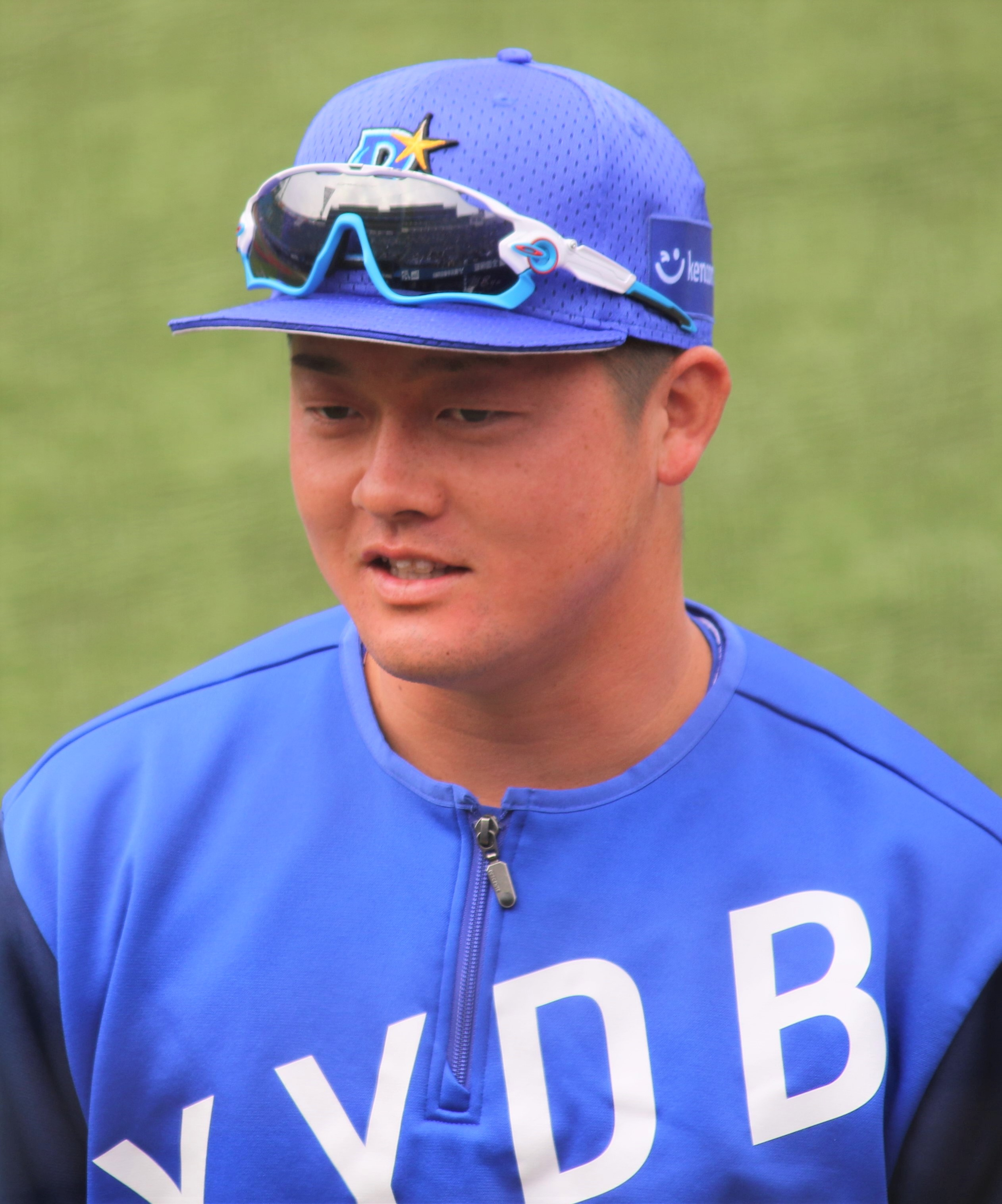
Shugo Maki hit a home run in the eighth inning of Game 2.

Thursday, October 15, 2026, 6:01 pm (JST) at Koshien Stadium in Nishinomiya, Hyogo
Team	1	2	3	4	5	6	7	8	9	R	H	E
DeNA	0	0	0	0	0	0	0	1	0	1	5	0
Hanshin	0	0	0	0	0	0	0	0	0	0	2	1
WP: Kosuke Baba (1–0) LP: Haruto Takahashi (0–1) Sv: Sean Reynolds (2); Home runs: DNA: Shugo Maki (1); HAN: None; Attendance: 42,643; Boxscore

The game went scoreless during the first seven innings. In the eighth inning, Shugo Maki broke the tie with a solo home run to left-center, scoring the only run of the game.

The BayStars pitchers threw a combined shutout once again. The starting pitcher Shuto Ogata threw four shutout innings, with four strikeouts, allowing two walks and a hit. Teruki Yoshino, José Ruiz and Masumi Hamachi each threw a 1-2-3 inning, with Yoshino in the fifth, Ruiz in the sixth, and Hamachi in the eighth.

In the bottom of the seventh inning, Yusuke Oyama reached on base after being hit by Masaki Iwata's pitch. Iwata then retired Nozomu Takatera and struck out Seiya Kinami. Iwata walked Torai Fushimi before Kosuke Baba took over, who struck out Masahiro Tateishi to end the inning. Baba was eventually credited the winning pitcher.

In the ninth inning, after striking out Ukyo Maegawa, Sean Reynolds walked Oyama and failed to retire Takatera on a bunt, resulting in an infield hit. Immediately after, Reynolds struck out Kinami and retired Fushimi, ending the inning and the game.

Haruto Takahashi started for the Tigers in Game 2. He pitched eighth innings with six strikeouts, allowed one walk and seven hits, including the home run by Maki, and gave up one run.

=== Game 3 ===
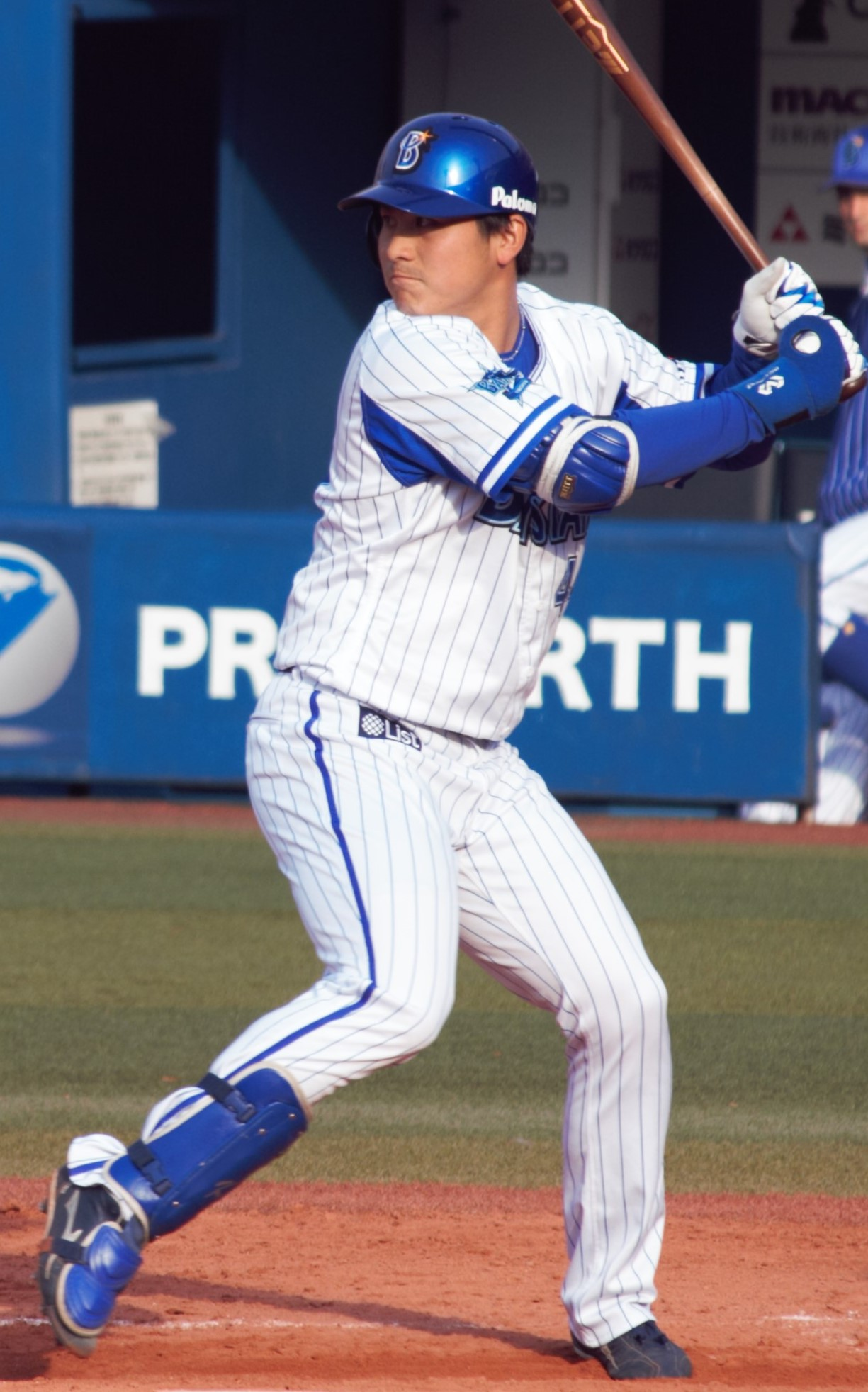
Keita Sano hit a 3-run home run in the third inning of Game 3.

Friday, October 16, 2026, 6:00 pm (JST) at Koshien Stadium in Nishinomiya, Hyogo
Team	1	2	3	4	5	6	7	8	9	R	H	E
DeNA	0	0	3	0	0	0	0	1	0	4	10	2
Hanshin	0	0	0	0	0	0	0	0	0	0	2	1
WP: Hiromi Katayama (1–0) LP: Hiroto Saiki (0–1); Home runs: DNA: Keita Sano (2), Shugo Maki (2); HAN: None; Attendance: 42,644; Boxscore

The BayStars scored first in the third inning. With one out, Ryuki Watarai hit a single to the left, then advanced to third on Shugo Maki's ground rule double. Watarai and Maki both scored on Keita Sano's 3-run home run to the center. Toshiro Miyazaki and Atsushi Katsumata were retired after, ending the frame. The BayStars scored their fourth run in the eighth inning with Maki's second home run of the series (four if counting the two home runs in the first stage).

The BayStars pitchers threw a combined shutout for the third time in this series. The starting pitcher Hiromi Katayama threw seven shutout innings with eight strikeouts, allowing one hit-by-pitch and two hits. Hiromu Ise and José Ruiz each threw a 1-2-3 inning, with Ise striking out the side in the eighth, and Ruiz recording one strike out and two lineouts in the ninth.

With this win, the BayStars were up 3–0 in the series, one win away from advancing to 2026 Japan Series.

=== Game 4 ===
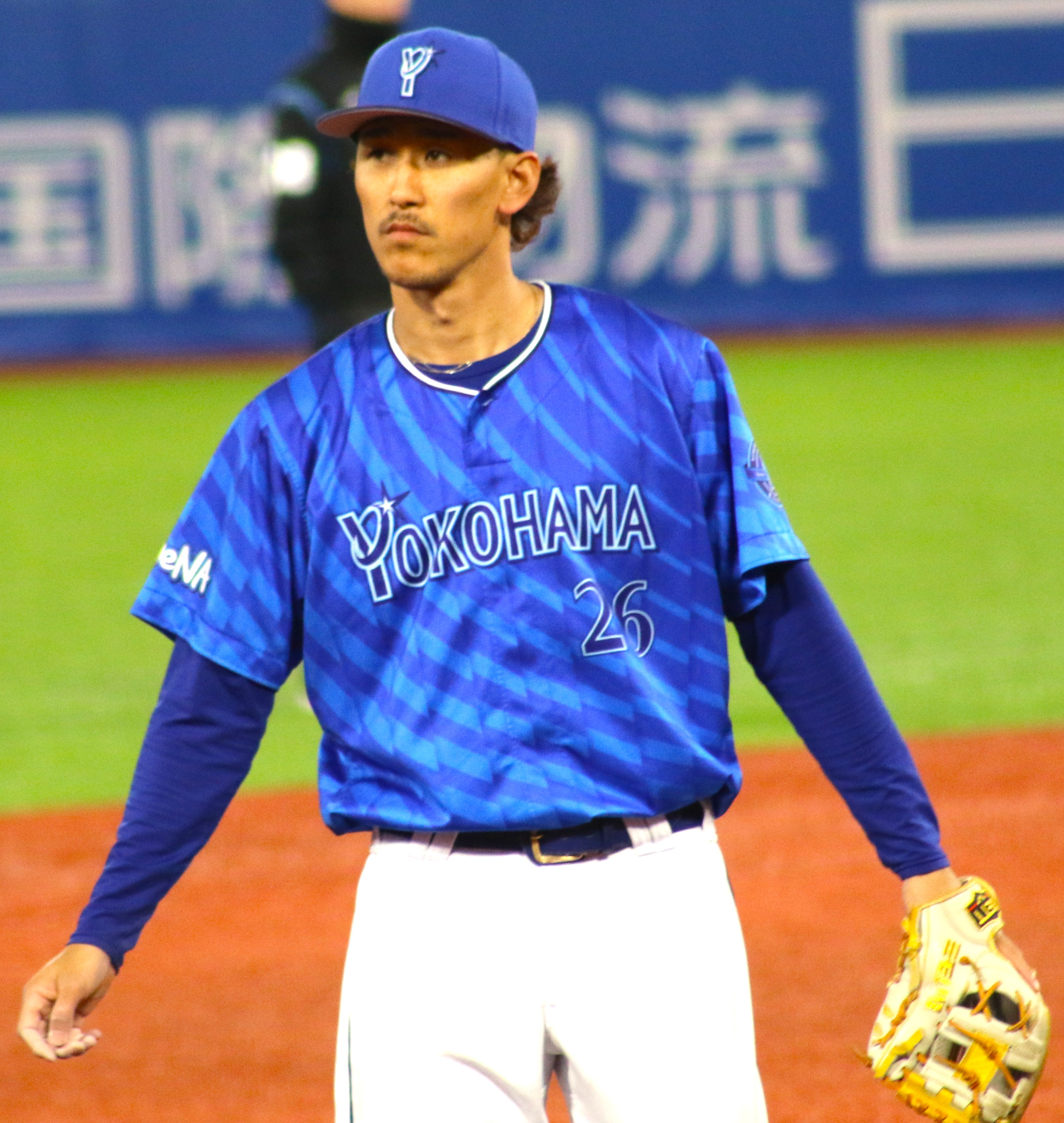
Masaki Mimori silented the Tigers fans with a go-ahead 2-run single in the ninth in Game 4.

Saturday, October 17, 2026, 2:01 pm (JST) at Koshien Stadium in Nishinomiya, Hyogo
Team	1	2	3	4	5	6	7	8	9	R	H	E
DeNA	1	0	0	2	0	0	0	1	4	8	12	3
Hanshin	1	0	0	0	1	1	2	0	0	5	14	1
WP: Kosuke Baba (2–0) LP: Taisei Kudō (0–1) Sv: Sean Reynolds (3); Home runs: DNA: Shuto Naruse (1); HAN: Shōta Morishita 2 (2); Attendance: 42,648; Boxscore

In the top of the first inning, with one out, Shugo Maki hit a single to the left, then advanced to third on Keita Sano's single. Maki scored on Toshiro Miyazaki's sacrifice fly. Sano attempted to score on Jerar Encarnación's double, but was thrown out at home by the left fielder Nozomu Takatera, ending the frame. In the bottom frame, Kōji Chikamoto reached first base on Maki's fielding error, then advanced to second on Shōta Morishita's single. Chikamoto scored on Yusuke Oyama's RBI single. The call was initially out at home but overturned after the Tigers challenged the call.

In the fourth inning, Miyazaki reached first base with an infield hit. Encarnación was struck out after, then Takeru Furuichi hit a ground ball to shortstop Takahiro Kumagai, resulted in a force out at second. Shuto Naruse then hit a home run to the left-center, giving the BayStars a 3-1 lead. Tatsuo Ebina was retired after to end the frame.

In the fifth inning, with one out, the Tigers cut the lead in half with Shōta Morishita's home run to the left field. The Tigers hit back-to-back singles immediately after, but both runners were stranded when Torai Fushimi hit a ground ball to third that resulted in an inning-ending double play.

In the top of the sixth inning, Sano reached first base with a single, then advanced to third on Encarnación's double. Sano attempted to score on Furuichi's ground ball to third, but was once again thrown out at home. Naruse was struck out after to end the frame. In the bottom frame, Takatera hit a leadoff single to the center, then advanced to third on Kumagai's sacrifice bunt and Hiyu Motoyama's ground ball to third. During Chikamoto's at-bat, Takatera scored the game-tying run on Miyazaki's fielding error. Takumu Nakano lined out to the center immediately after, ending the frame.

In the seventh inning, the Tigers took the lead for the first time in the series with Morishita's leadoff home run, which is his second home run of the game. Immediately after, Teruaki Satō hit a double to the left, then advancing to third on Oyama's single. Fushimi's sacrifice fly scored Satō and advanced Oyama to second, with Oyama eventually stranded. In the eighth inning, Maki reached first base with a hit by pitch, and Sano walked. Maki scored on Miyazaki's RBI single. The Tigers pulled Rito Kinoshita and Taisei Kudō took over. Kudō retired the next three batters to end the frame and keep the lead for the Tigers.

In the top of the ninth inning, with one out, Shion Matsuo walked, then advanced to third on Watarai's single, a ground ball deflected off the second baseman Nakano in the shallow right field. Maki then hit a ground ball to first baseman Oyama, who decided to throw home, catching Matsuo in a rundown between third and home. During the rundown Watarai advanced to third while Maki reached second. With Tigers being one strike away from living another day, and the "One More Strike!" chant from the Tigers fans echoing throughout Koshien Stadium, the next batter Masaki Mimori hit a fly ball that fell to the ground in the shallow left-center field, resulting in a 2-run single, scoring Maki and Watarai. With this hit, Kudō blew the two-inning save, and left the mound after intentionally walked Miyazaki. Rafael Dolis took over, and immediately allowed back-to-back RBI singles in two pitches, with these two runs earned to Kudō. Dolis retired Naruse to finally end the frame.

In the bottom frame, the Tigers had the bases loaded with one hit and two walks, but were ultimately stranded, with Sean Reynolds striking out the side, ending the game and the series. The BayStars won four straight games and advanced to the Japan Series, facing Fukuoka SoftBank Hawks once again just like two years ago.

== Aftermath ==
With the sweep over Tigers, the BayStars advanced to 2026 Japan Series, where they will face Fukuoka SoftBank Hawks once again since two years ago.

Shugo Maki was named the MVP of the series. He finished the series with a .381 batting average (8 for 21), with 4 home runs, 4 runs batted in and a 1.746 OPS. All of his four home runs are against the left-hand pitchers.

A reward called "Tomose Minna de" JERA Award (「灯セ、みんなで。」JERA賞) was newly established, in which the fans vote for who they think shining the most in the series. Ryūki Watarai was the winner of this award. He finished the series with a .280 batting average (7 for 25), with 2 home runs, 2 runs batted in and a .800 OPS. In the first stage, his home run at the ninth broke the tie and help the BayStars win Game 1. He hit another home run in Game 2. Although he was 0-for-8 in the first two games of the final stage, he broke out in Game 3 with a 3-for-4 performance, including a skilled hit against Hanshin ace Haruto Saiki. His only hit in Game 4 is also important, setting up stages for BayStars' comeback in the ninth.
