= 2024 Pacific League Climax Series =

Japanese baseball series

First stage
Team (Wins)		Manager	Season
Hokkaido Nippon-Ham Fighters (2)		Tsuyoshi Shinjo	75–60–8 (.556), 13½ GB
Chiba Lotte Marines (1)		Masato Yoshii	71–66–6 (.518), 18½ GB
- Dates: October 12–14

Final stage
Team (Wins)		Manager	Season
Fukuoka SoftBank Hawks (4)		Hiroki Kokubo	91–49–3 (.650), 13½ GA
Hokkaido Nippon-Ham Fighters (0)		Tsuyoshi Shinjo	75–60–8 (.556), 13½ GB
- Dates: October 16–18
- MVP: Hotaka Yamakawa (SoftBank)

The 2024 Pacific League Climax Series was a set of two consecutive playoff series in Nippon Professional Baseball. The first stage began on October 12th and the final stage concluded on October 18th. The first stage was a best-of-three series between the second-place Hokkaido Nippon-Ham Fighters and the third-place Chiba Lotte Marines. The final stage was a best-of-six against the Fukuoka SoftBank Hawks, the Pacific League (PL) champion, being awarded a one-win advantage against the Fighters, the eventual winner of the first stage. The Hawks advanced to the 2024 Japan Series to compete against the winner of the 2024 Central League Climax Series, the Yokohama DeNA BayStars.

== Background ==
For the seventh year in a row, Persol Holdings sponsored the naming rights for the Pacific League Climax Series, and it was officially known as the "2024 Persol Climax Series PA".

The Fukuoka SoftBank Hawks clinched their first Pacific League (PL) championship in four years and 20th overall on September 23. Hiroki Kokubo led the Hawks to the pennant in his first year as the team's manager. SoftBank led the league for the majority of the season, never relinquishing first place after taking the top spot on April 4th. SoftBank won their final game of the season, allowing Kokubo to break the record for most wins in single regular season as a first-year manager. Several Hawks players won end-of-season PL superlatives. On offense, Hotaka Yamakawa finished the season with 34 home runs and 99 runs batted in, the most by a wide margin. Kensuke Kondo's .314 batting average earned him the PL batting title and the PL MVP award, and Ukyo Shuto stole the most bases. Among pitchers, Liván Moinelo had the best earned run average (ERA) among PL starting pitchers with a 1.88 ERA in his first season as a starter and Kohei Arihara ended the season tied for the most wins, with 14.

The Hokkaido Nippon-Ham Fighters had finished fifth in the last three seasons under former manager Hideki Kuriyama and last in the league the previous two seasons since Tsuyoshi Shinjo was hired as manager. On September 26, however, the team secured a Climax Series berth for the first time in six years, and clinched second-place two days later. Ariel Martínez, Yua Tamiya, and Chusei Mannami's offensive contributions helped the Fighters to finish the first half of the season four games over .500 and in the top three. In the second half, Kotaro Kiyomiya returned from injury, and along with former Major League Baseball player Franmil Reyes, both played important roles in Nippon-Ham's continued offensive success. By August they had moved into second place ahead of the Chiba Lotte Marines where they would stay until season's end.

The third and final playoff slot was contested by the Marines and the Tohoku Rakuten Golden Eagles late into September. After being in fourth place the majority of the season, the Eagles won a game against Lotte, their fifth straight win overall, on September 18th that moved them into third place in the PL. Rakuten's winning streak was brought to an end the next game, however, moving them back into fourth behind the Marines. After, the Eagles went on a losing streak and the Marines were able to secure third place and a playoff berth with a win against Rakuten on October 1. It was Rakuten's third consecutive season placing fourth and missing the Climax Series and Lotte's second consecutive year heading to the playoffs.

== First stage ==
Intra-league teams play 25 games against each other during the regular season. The Hokkaido Nippon-Ham Fighters won the season series against the Chiba Lotte Marines 18–6–1 and finished 5 games ahead of them. The two teams have only met in the postseason two times prior to this year, with each team winning one series. A best-of-three series, all games in the first stage were hosted by Nippon-Ham, the higher seeded team, at their home ballpark, Es Con Field Hokkaido. The series was the first time a postseason game was held at Es Con Field, which first opened for the 2023 season.

=== Summary ===
Nippon-Ham won the series, 2–1.

Game	Date	Score	Location	Time	Attendance
1	October 12	Chiba Lotte Marines – 2, Hokkaido Nippon-Ham Fighters – 0	Es Con Field Hokkaido	2:55	37,553
2	October 13	Chiba Lotte Marines – 2, Hokkaido Nippon-Ham Fighters – 3 (10)	Es Con Field Hokkaido	3:33	37,638
3	October 14	Chiba Lotte Marines – 2, Hokkaido Nippon-Ham Fighters – 5	Es Con Field Hokkaido	3:04	37,478

=== Game 1 ===
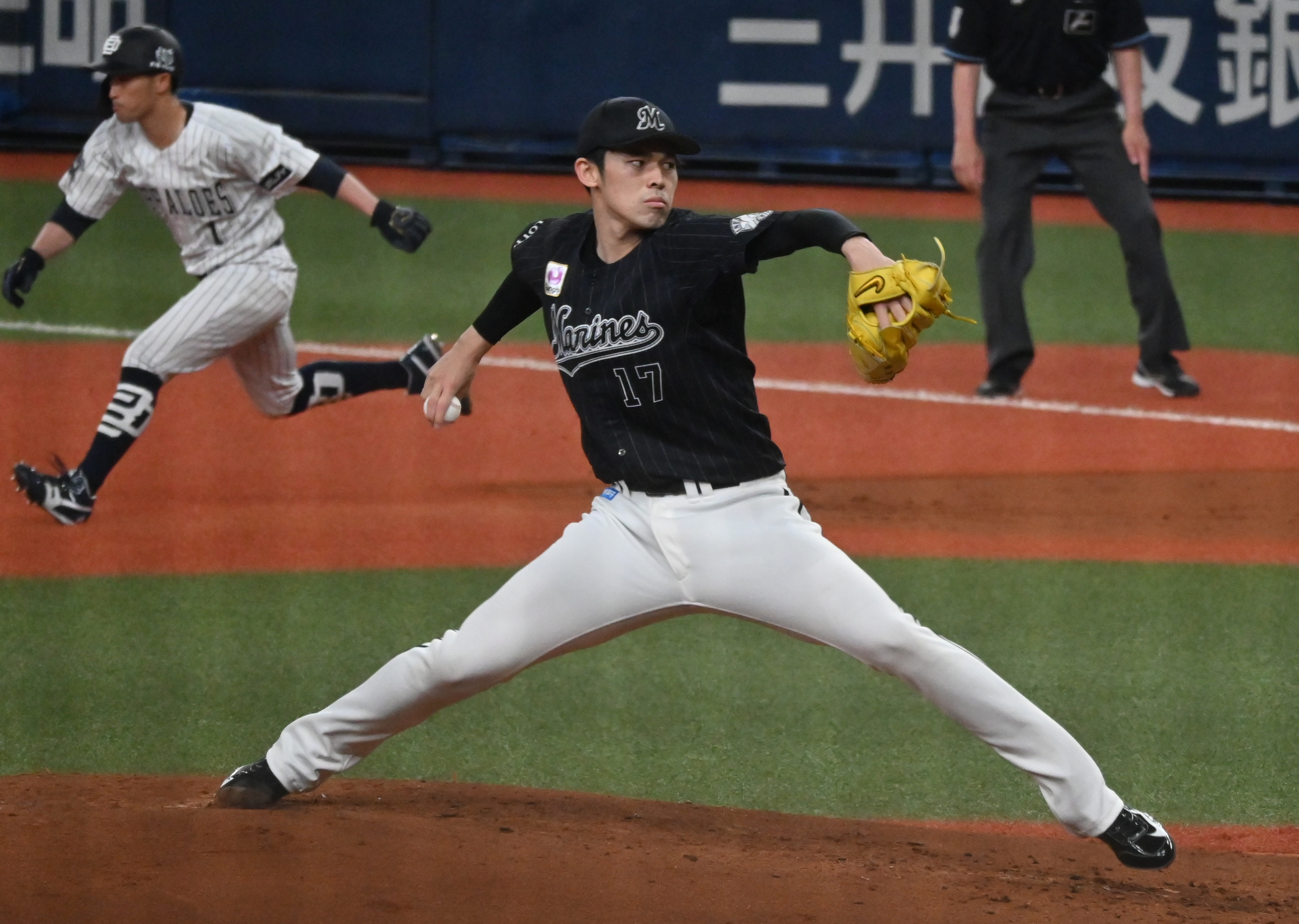
Lotte's Roki Sasaki pitched eight scoreless innings in Game 1.

Saturday, October 12, 2024, 2:00 pm (JST) at Es Con Field Hokkaido in Kitahiroshima, Hokkaido
Team	1	2	3	4	5	6	7	8	9	R	H	E
Lotte	0	0	0	0	1	0	1	0	0	2	8	0
Nippon-Ham	0	0	0	0	0	0	0	0	0	0	5	0
WP: Roki Sasaki (1–0) LP: Takayuki Kato (0–1) Sv: Naoya Masuda (1); Home runs: LOT: Shogo Nakamura (1), Gregory Polanco (1); NIP: None; Attendance: 37,553; Boxscore

Hokkaido native and Olympic gold medalist javelin thrower Haruka Kitaguchi threw out the ceremonial first pitch. Roki Sasaki was the starting pitcher for Lotte, while Takayuki Kato started for Nippon-Ham. Sasaki pitched eight shutout innings, struck out nine batters, and allowed only five singles and two walks. Shogo Nakamura and Gregory Polanco each hit solo home runs off of Nippon-Ham's Kato in the fifth and seven innings, respectively, the scoring the only runs of the game. Marines relief pitchers Shota Suzuki and Naoya Masuda pitched in the bottom of the ninth inning and retired all three batters, securing the win for Lotte.

=== Game 2 ===
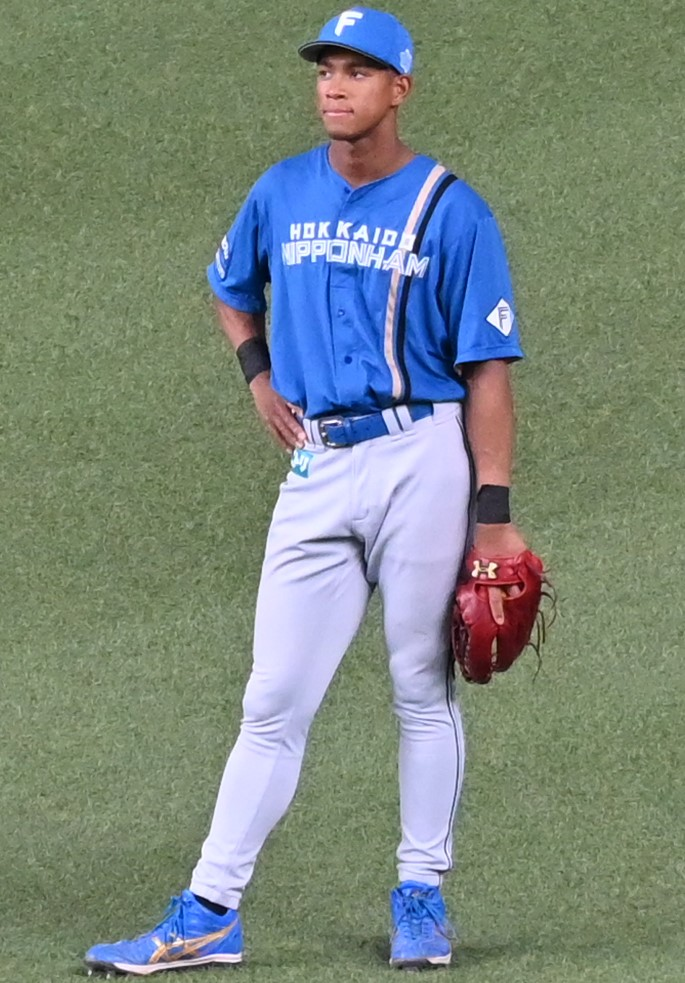
Chusei Mannami hit a solo home run in Game 2's ninth inning, forcing extra innings.

Sunday, October 13, 2024, 2:01 pm (JST) at Es Con Field Hokkaido in Kitahiroshima, Hokkaido
Team	1	2	3	4	5	6	7	8	9	10	R	H	E
Lotte	0	0	0	0	1	0	1	0	0	0	2	5	0
Nippon-Ham	0	0	0	0	0	0	1	0	1	1X	3	9	0
WP: Sachiya Yamasaki (1–0) LP: Hirokazu Sawamura (0–1); Home runs: LOT: Hisanori Yasuda (1), Katsuya Kakunaka (1); NIP: Chusei Mannami (1); Attendance: 37,638; Boxscore

Shoma Kanemura started Game 2 for Nippon-Ham and Kazuya Ojima started for Lotte. Kanemura limited the Marines to just one hit through the first four innings, however Hisanori Yasuda hit a solo home run off of him in the fifth inning to take the lead for Lotte. Katsuya Kakunaka followed that up with another solo home run for the Marines in the seventh inning to extended their lead to 2–0. The Fighters responded in their half of the seventh inning when two walks by Ojima allowed two batters on base. After the walks, Ojima was relieved by Rikuto Yokoyama who then threw a wild pitch, which allowed runners to advance to second and third bases. Ariel Martínez then drove in one run on a fielder's choice, cutting Lotte's lead to one.

Fighters starting pitcher Sachiya Yamasaki then entered the game in his first relief appearance for the team and kept the Marines scoreless in the eighth and ninth innings. Chusei Mannami then hit a solo home run off of Marines pitcher Naoya Masuda in the last of the ninth inning to tie the game and force extra innings. Lotte failed to score in the tenth inning. After recording two outs in the bottom half of the tenth inning, pitcher Hirokazu Sawamura allowed a walk and a hit, putting baserunners on first and third base. A single by Daiki Asama then scored a run, resulting in a walk-off win for the Fighters.

=== Game 3 ===
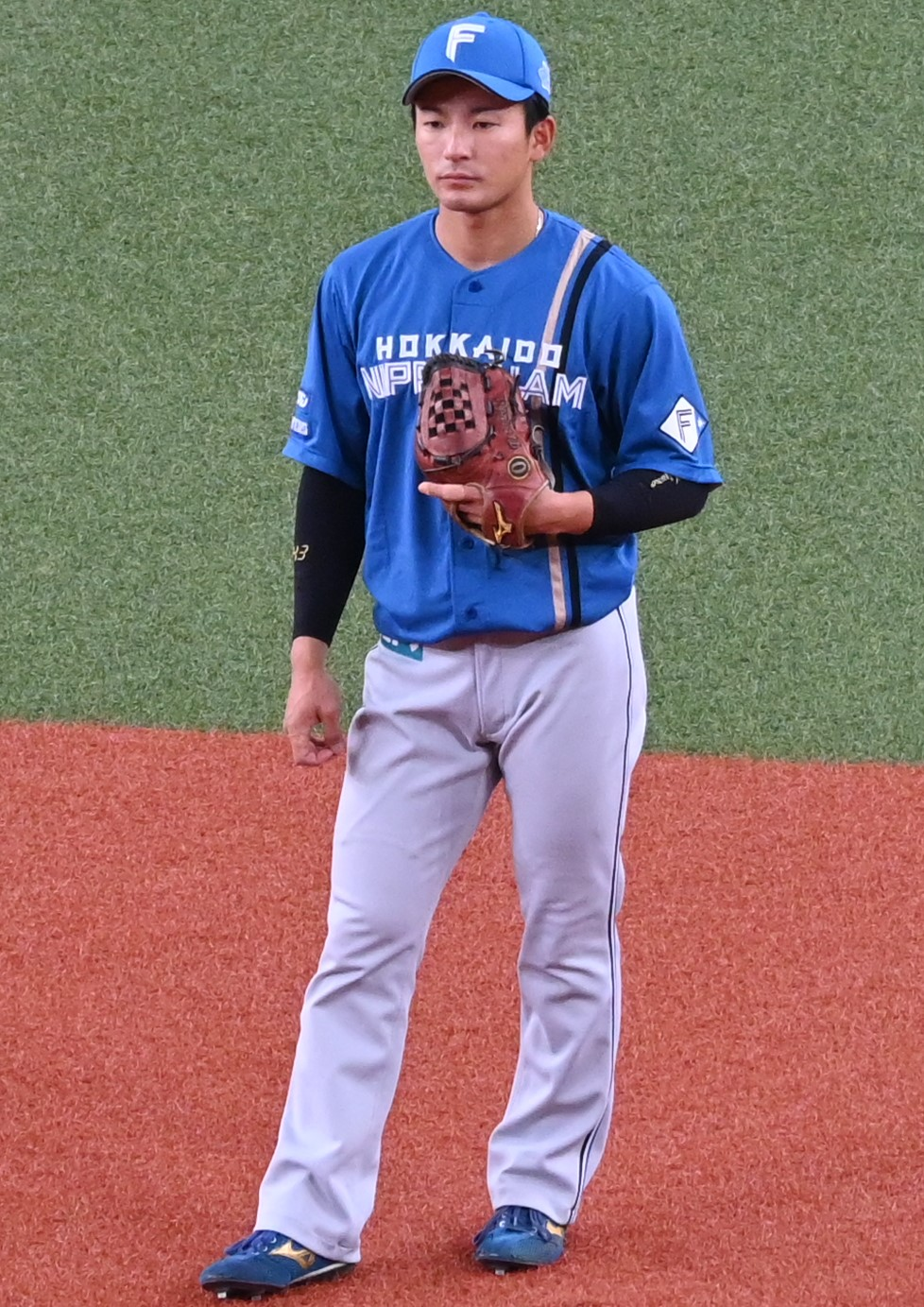
Tatsuki Mizuno hit a two-run triple in Game 3.

Monday, October 14, 2024, 2:01 pm (JST) at Es Con Field Hokkaido in Kitahiroshima, Hokkaido
Team	1	2	3	4	5	6	7	8	9	R	H	E
Lotte	0	2	0	0	0	0	0	0	0	2	6	2
Nippon-Ham	0	0	2	0	0	0	2	1	X	5	7	0
WP: Ryusei Kawano (1–0) LP: Atsuki Taneichi (0–1) Sv: Naoki Miyanishi (1); Attendance: 37,478; Boxscore

Atsuki Taneichi was the Game 3 starter for the Marines while Koki Kitayama started for the Fighters. In the second inning, after Kitayama allowed a one-out double and a single, Lotte scored a run via a safety squeeze bunt for a hit. A flyball later in the inning extended Lotte's lead to two. It was the third time in the series that Nippon-Ham was behind 2–0. The Fighters responded in the third inning with two outs and runners on second and third when Kotaro Kiyomiya drove in two runs with a single to right field off of Taneichi to tie the game. The game remained tied until the seventh inning when Taneichi gave up a two-out triple to Nippon-Ham's Tatsuki Mizuno with runners on first and second base to give the Fighters a 4–2 lead. Mannami added an insurance run with a run-batted-in (RBI) single in the eighth inning. Nippon-Ham used four pitchers in relief of Kitayama after he left the game in the fifth inning. The relievers shutout Lotte, which failed to advance any runner past first base after the third inning, and secured the win and advanced to the final stage.

== Final stage ==
As winners of the Pacific League, the Fukuoka SoftBank Hawks advanced directly to the final stage of the Climax Series to host the Fighters, the eventual winner of the first stage. SoftBank and Nippon-Ham split their season series 12–12–1, however, the Hawks finished the season 13½ games ahead of the Fighters. The two teams had faced each other in the Climax Series four times previously, with each team winning two series. For the final stage, the PL champion Hawks were awarded a one-game advantage over the Fighters. A best-of-six series, all games in the final stage were hosted by SoftBank, the higher seeded team, at their home ballpark, Mizuho PayPay Dome.

=== Summary ===
SoftBank won the series, 4–0*.

Game	Date	Score	Location	Time	Attendance
1	October 16	Hokkaido Nippon-Ham Fighters – 2, Fukuoka SoftBank Hawks – 5	Mizuho PayPay Dome	2:40	40,142
2	October 17	Hokkaido Nippon-Ham Fighters – 2, Fukuoka SoftBank Hawks – 7	Mizuho PayPay Dome	3:18	40,142
3	October 18	Hokkaido Nippon-Ham Fighters – 2, Fukuoka SoftBank Hawks – 3	Mizuho PayPay Dome	2:50	40,142

* The Pacific League regular season champion is given a one-game advantage in the final stage.

=== Game 1 ===
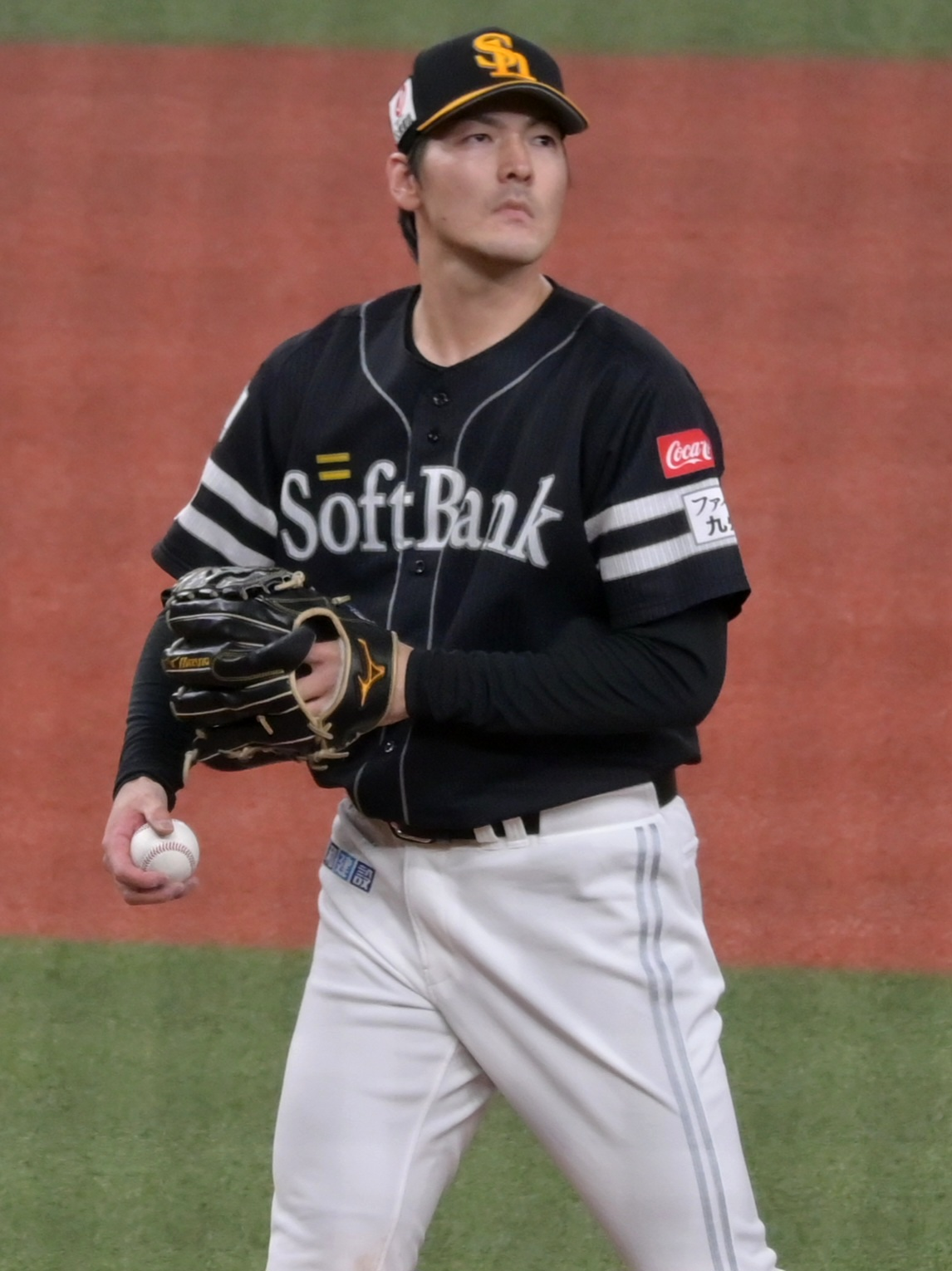
Kohei Arihara allowed two runs in seven innings pitched in Game 1.

Wednesday, October 16, 2024, 6:00 pm (JST) at Mizuho PayPay Dome in Fukuoka, Fukuoka Prefecture
Team	1	2	3	4	5	6	7	8	9	R	H	E
Nippon-Ham	0	0	1	0	0	0	1	0	0	2	7	0
SoftBank	0	1	1	1	1	0	0	1	X	5	11	0
WP: Kohei Arihara (1–0) LP: Hiromi Itoh (0–1) Sv: Roberto Osuna (1); Home runs: NIP: Franmil Reyes (1); SOF: Kenta Imamiya (1), Ryoya Kurihara (1), Hotaka Yamakawa (1); Attendance: 40,142; Boxscore

Olympic gold medalist judoka Hifumi Abe threw out the ceremonial first pitch. In the first stage, Fighters manager Tsuyoshi Shinjo opted not to use the team's best starting pitcher, Hiromi Itoh. Shinjo gambled that they would defeat the Marines without the help of Itoh so he could instead rest him in preparation of Game 1 of the final stage against the Hawks. With Itoh starting for the Fighters, the Hawks started Kohei Arihara for Game 1. Both pitchers won 14 games during the regular season, the most in the PL. The match-up was only the second time in Climax Series history that the season's two win leaders faced each other. Back from a right ankle sprain a month prior, SoftBank's Kensuke Kondoh doubled in the second inning and further advanced to third on a single. Tomoya Masaki then drove Kondoh in to opening the scoring and giving the Hawks an early one-run lead. Nippon-Ham tied the game the next inning and almost took the lead if not for an impressive defensive play by Hawks second baseman Hikaru Kawase that saved a run by starting an inning-ending double play. SoftBank quickly retook the lead in their half of the third inning with a single by Kawase and an RBI double by Hotaka Yamakawa that drove him in. They added two more runs via solo home runs from Kenta Imamiya and Ryoya Kurihara in the fourth and fifth innings, respectively. Itoh was removed from the game in the middle of the sixth after allowing four runs over 5 2/3 innings.

Arihara continued to pitch into the seventh inning when he gave up a solo home run to Franmil Reyes to bring the Fighters within two. Later in the inning, with runners on second and third bases Arihara struck out Daiki Asama to end the threat, the inning, and his outing. In the eighth inning, Yamakawa added an insurance run for the Hawks with a solo home run that would prove unnecessary as SoftBank went on to win 5–2.

=== Game 2 ===
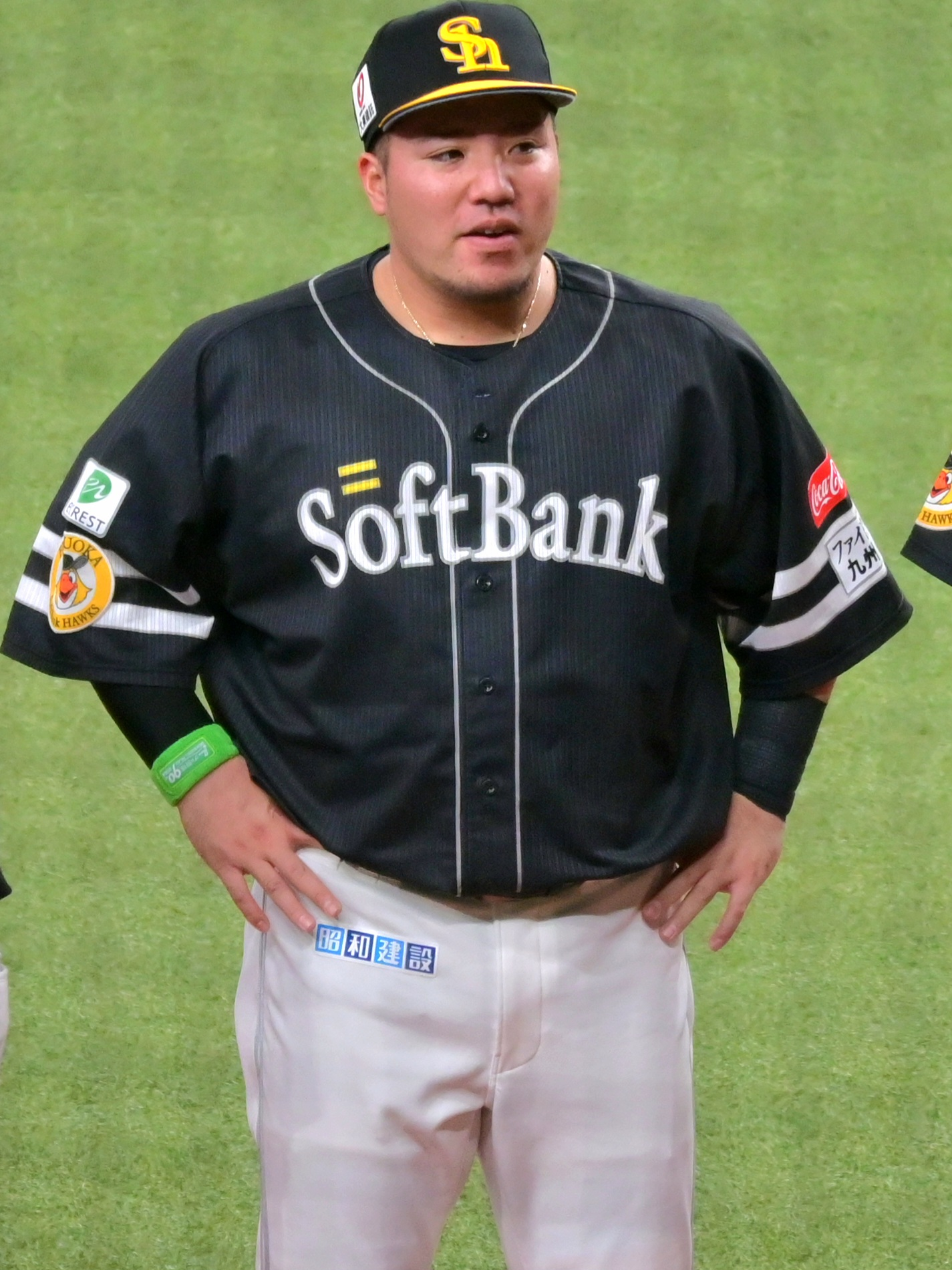
Hotaka Yamakawa hit two home runs in Game 2.

Thursday, October 17, 2024, 6:00 pm (JST) at Mizuho PayPay Dome in Fukuoka, Fukuoka Prefecture
Team	1	2	3	4	5	6	7	8	9	R	H	E
Nippon-Ham	1	1	0	0	0	0	0	0	0	2	10	0
SoftBank	3	1	0	0	1	1	1	0	X	7	11	0
WP: Liván Moinelo (1–0) LP: Takayuki Katoh (0–1); Home runs: NIP: None; SOF: Kensuke Kondoh (1), Hotaka Yamakawa 2 (3); Attendance: 40,142; Boxscore

Game 2 featured pitchers Liván Moinelo for the Hawks and Takayuki Katoh for the Fighters. Moinelo, a former relief pitcher that was converted to a starting pitcher this season, gave up two doubles to the Fighters in the first inning, allowing them to take a quick 1–0 lead. SoftBank tied the game in the bottom of the inning on Hotaka Yamakawa's two-out single that drove in a runner from second base. Later that inning, Kato gave up a two-run home run to Kensuke Kondo to give SoftBank a 3–1 lead. Nippon-Ham cut SoftBank's lead in half in the top of the second inning, however, the Hawks again responded in the bottom of the inning by scoring two more runs, prompting the Fighters to remove Katoh from the game after only 1 2/3 innings.

With the help of his defense, Moinelo was able to keep the Fighters from scoring again. He was replaced after six inning and the Hawks' relief pitchers held Nippon-Ham to two runs for the remainder of the game. SoftBank, however, continued to score runs. Yamakawa hit his second home run of the series, a solo shot, in the fifth inning and then hit another one in the seventh inning. The Hawks went on to defeat the Fighters by a score of 7–2.

=== Game 3 ===
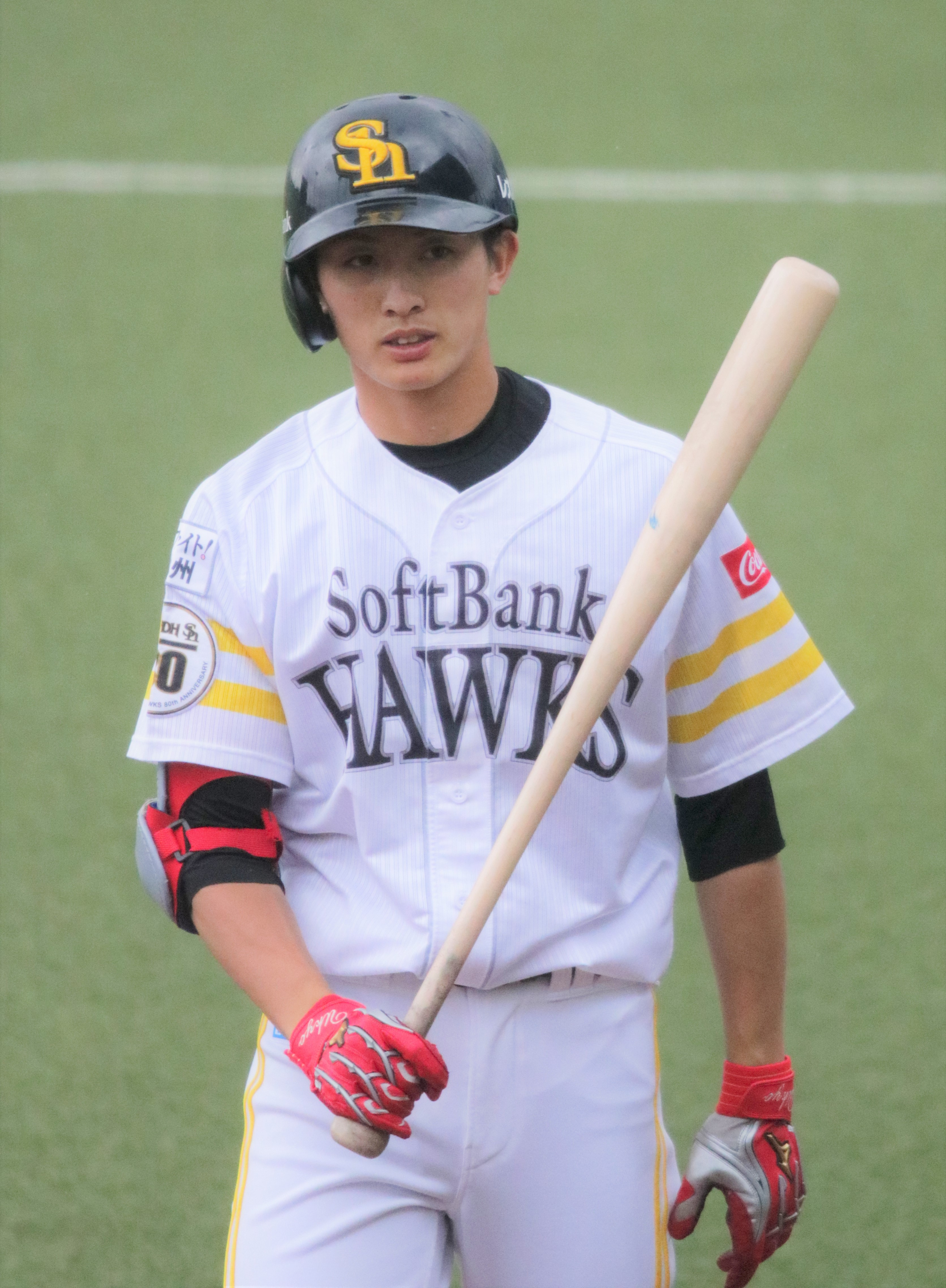
Ukyo Shuto had the game-winning RBI in Game 3.

Friday, October 18, 2024, 6:00 pm (JST) at Mizuho PayPay Dome in Fukuoka, Fukuoka Prefecture
Team	1	2	3	4	5	6	7	8	9	R	H	E
Nippon-Ham	0	0	2	0	0	0	0	0	0	2	5	1
SoftBank	2	0	0	1	0	0	0	0	X	3	7	1
WP: Carter Stewart Jr. (1–0) LP: Sachiya Yamasaki (0–1) Sv: Roberto Osuna (2); Home runs: NIP: Torai Fushimi (1); SOF: None; Attendance: 40,142; Boxscore

Carter Stewart Jr. started for SoftBank and Sachiya Yamasaki started for Nippon-Ham. Yamakawa and Kondoh hit two back-to-back, two-out, RBI doubles of off Yamasaki to give the Hawks a quick two-run lead in the first inning. The Fighters answered in the third inning when Carter allowed Torai Fushimi to hit a leadoff solo home run. Later in the inning, a walk and a single set Mannami up to hit an RBI-single to even the score at 2–2. In the fourth inning, with two outs and runners on first and third base, Ukyo Shuto hit an RBI single, which would prove to be the game-winning hit. Stewart retired seven of the last eight batters he faced and left after five innings pitched. Four Hawks relievers each gave the team four scoreless innings to secure SoftBank the win, the series sweep, and advancement to the Japan Series.

== Aftermath ==
The Hawks' win qualified them to play in the Japan Series for the 21st time, tied with the Saitama Seibu Lions for the most times in the Pacific League. It was also their fourth time advancing through the Climax Series via a sweep. The other three times they swept in the Climax Series, they went on to win the Japan Series. After Game 3, Hotaka Yamakawa was named the final stage's most valuable player (MVP). Kenta Imamiya won the Persol Award, a fan-decided MVP award. With the awards, both players received one million yen prizes.
