= Takahiro Kumagai =

Japanese baseball player (born 1995)

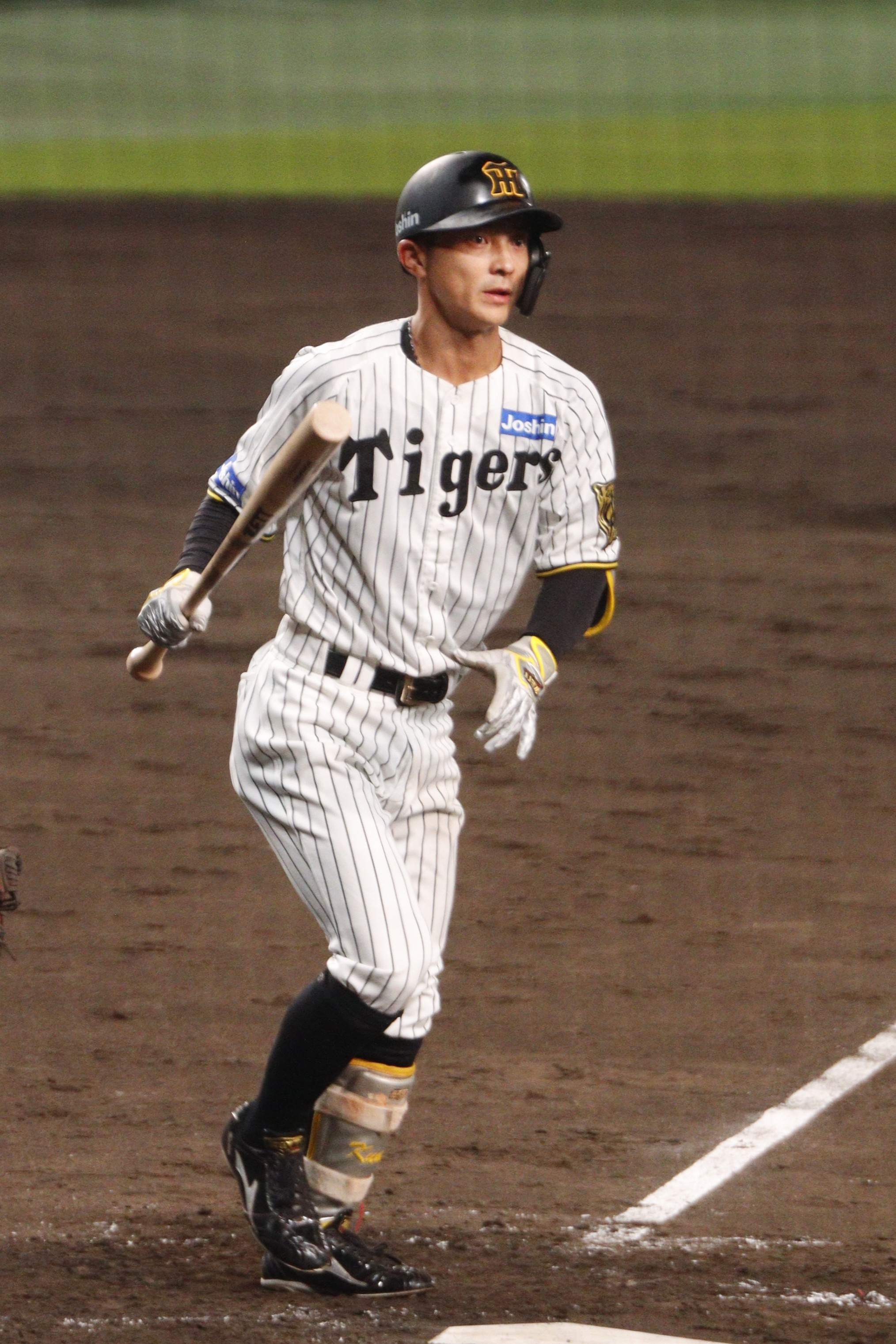
- Kumagai with the Tigers, August 30, 2025

Hanshin Tigers – No. 4
- Infielder
- Born: November 10, 1995 (age 30); Sendai, Tōhoku, Japan
- Bats: Right Throws: Right

NPB debut
- May 19, 2018, for the Hanshin Tigers

NPB statistics (through 2025 season)
- Batting average: .213
- Home runs: 1
- Runs batted in: 26
- Stats at Baseball Reference

Teams
- Hanshin Tigers (2018–present)
Medals
Men's baseball
Representing Japan
18U Baseball World Cup
Silver medal – second place	2013 Taichung	Team

Takahiro Kumagai (熊谷 敬宥, Kumagai Takahiro; born November 10, 1995, in Sendai, Miyagi) is a Japanese professional baseball infielder for the Hanshin Tigers of Nippon Professional Baseball (NPB).

== Early baseball career ==
Born in Sendai City, he started playing baseball with his friends as early as 2nd grade, played little league for the Nankodai Shonen baseball club, and joined the Nankodai Tobu Seniors in junior high.

He entered Sendai Ikuei Gakuen High School, a known baseball powerhouse, and played short stop as his team participated twice in the Summer Koshien Tournaments. In his senior year, his team made it all the way to the Spring Koshien semi-finals, and during the summer nationals, he notched a walk-off hit to win the first round against Urawa Gakuin High School. After the nationals, he joined the national team as an outfielder to play in the 2013 18U Baseball World Cup. As the 2nd batter, he helped Japan win the runner up by recording 8 hits and 5 stolen bases.

He entered Rikkyo University and secured the short stop position as his team participated in Tokyo Big6 tournaments. As team captain in his 4th year, he earned the league title for most stolen bases, and led his team to win both the Tokyo Big6 championships and Japan National Collegiate Baseball Championship, a feat that hasn't been achieved by his school in the last 59 years. In 61 league appearances, he finished with a batting average of 0.220, 12 RBIs including a single home run. He again joined the national team to compete at the Baseball at the 2017 Summer Universiade, where Japan took home the gold medal.

== Professional career ==
=== Hanshin Tigers ===
He was the Hanshin Tigers' 3rd round pick in the 2017 Nippon Professional Baseball draft. He inked a 60 million yen contract with the Tigers for a 10 million yen annual salary. He was assigned the jersey number 4. The 1st round pick of the same draft, pitcher Kosuke Baba, was his teammate in high school.

=== 2018 ===
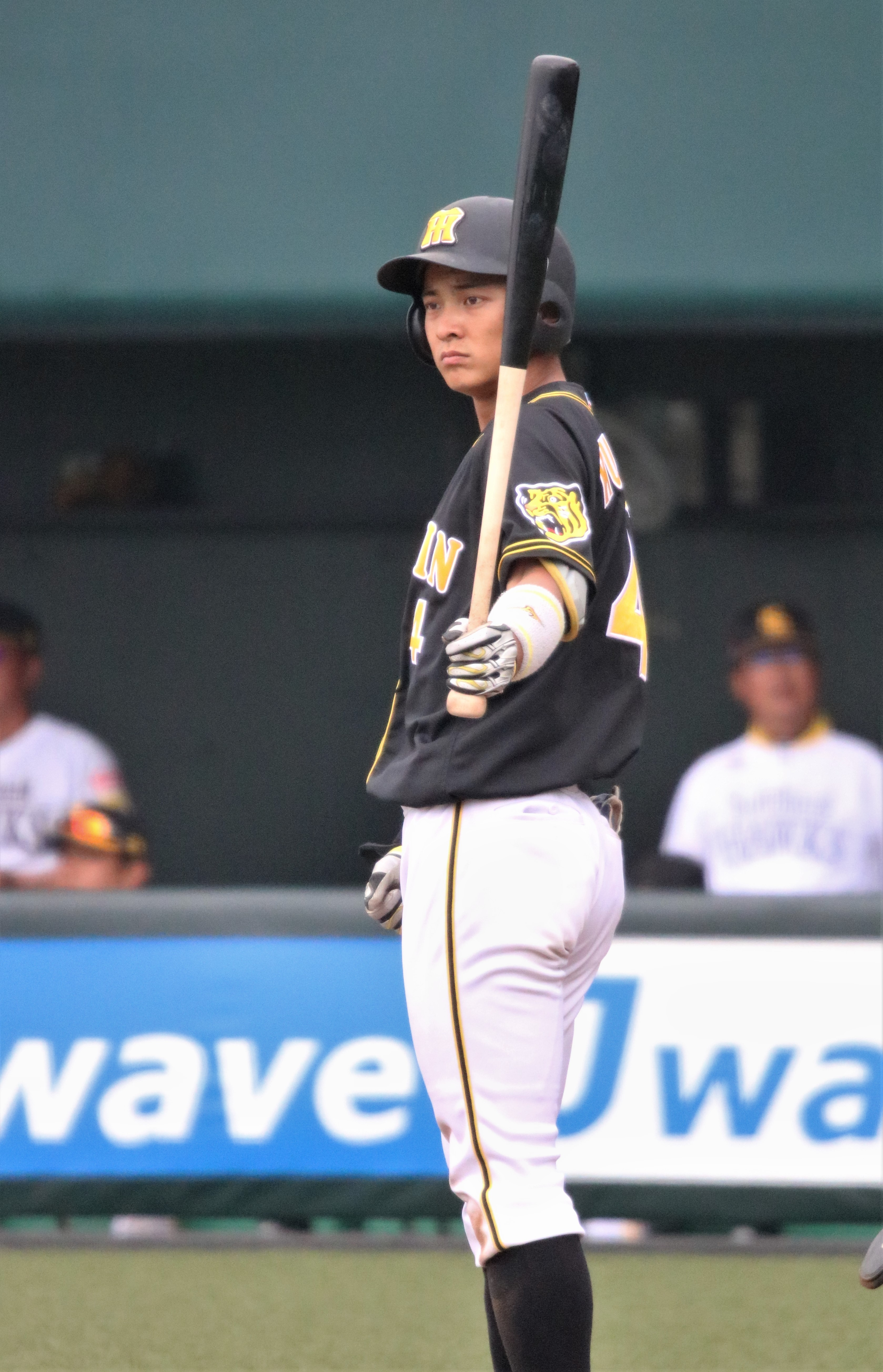
Kumagai playing for the Tigers, May 1, 2018

He joined the main squad during spring training in Okinawa but was sent back to the farm before the season began. He spent the first few weeks playing shortstop or 2nd baseman in minor Western League games. By mid-May, although he batted a lackluster average of 0.214, he topped the league in stolen bases (20 SBs out of 42 games). He was then called to the main squad on May 19 to debut as a 1st base pinch runner for Hayata Ito in the 8th inning, and recorded his career first stolen base during the next batter's at-bat. His first plate appearance came on May 27 as a pinch hitter at the bottom of the 8th, and recorded his first career hit against the Yomiuri Giants in Hanshin Koshien Stadium. After a few more scattered plate appearances, he made it to the starting line-up as 2nd batter on June 30. His 2nd at-bat resulted into his first RBI as a right-handed batter, while he got his 1st hit batting left in his 4th at-bat. He alternated between the main squad and the farms for a few more matches, but was eventually sent back to the farms for the remainder of the season. Out of 19 main squad games, he finished with a 0.231 average, 2 RBIs and 3 stolen bases. He also participated as shortstop during the post-season farm championship match where Hanshin won (8-4), and he was awarded the game's MVP (1 RBI, 1 earned run, 1 stolen base).

=== 2019 ===
He decided to focus on right-handed hitting after the farm spring training in Aki, Kochi. On March 4, the registration was changed from R/D to R/R. He spent the entire season playing in the farms. Out of 114 Western League game appearances, he finished with a batting average of 0.234, 43 RBIs including 2 home runs, and 17 stolen bases. After the regular season, he joined Miyazaki Phoenix League and worked on the outfield defense.

=== 2020 ===
He played in 38 main squad games. While being mainly used as a pinch runner and infield defense, he finished with a batting average of 0.313 (5 hits in 16 at bats), and 3 stolen bases.

=== 2021 ===
In 2021, while spending the spring training in the farm, the batting is good in the actual battle. Joining the main squad in the middle of the Exhibition games as a utility player who can also handle outfield defense while registering as an infielder, he participated in the match against Tokyo Yakult Swallows (at Meiji Jingu Stadium) for the first time on March 28 after the opening, as an official match of the first army. For the first time, he played as an outfielder (right fielder) from the bottom of the 8th inning. In subsequent official games, he was often appointed as a pinch runner in difficult situations that affected the game, and there were many scenes where the success of stealing a base led to a tie and stepping on the home of the final.

=== 2022 ===
In 2022, he started as a main squad player from the opening. In the match against Yokohama DeNA BayStars (at Yokohama Stadium) on April 2, he was appointed to the starting lineup for the first time in 545 days since 2020. After that, he was mainly used as a pinch runner at the turning point. In the match against Orix Buffaloes (at Kyocera Dome Osaka) on June 11, he was appointed as a pinch runner for Teruaki Sato in the 11th inning. He stole a base after one out, and catcher Torai Fushimi threw the ball to second base, but the ball hit Kumagai's helmet. While the ball with a different trajectory strayed into the outfield, he immediately ran to home base. This was the final point, and he received a hero interview for the first time after he became a professional. In the match against Chunichi Dragons on June 26 (at Koshien), at bat in the bottom of 11th ining, he hit a walk-off single from Takumi Yamamoto. After that, he was mainly used as a pinch runner defense, but on August 8, he was confirmed to be infected with the COVID-19, and on the next day, he was sent to the farm.

=== 2023 ===
In 2023, he mainly appeared as a pinch runner, just like the previous year. In the match against Chunichi Dragons (at Kyocera Dome Osaka) on August 22, he was appointed as a pinch runner for Johan Mieses in the 7th inning. With two outs and a runner on first base, Shota Morishita hit a double to left-center field, allowing Kumagai to score all the way from first base. In Game 1 of the Japan Series against the Orix Buffaloes (at Kyocera Dome Osaka), he appeared as a pinch runner for Kento Itohara in the 8th inning, contributing to the team's championship victory.

=== 2024 ===
In 2024, although he accompanied the first team throughout the season, his appearances were mostly limited to defensive substitutions and pinch-running in the later innings, and he only played in 32 games.

=== 2025 ===
In 2025, he was promoted to the first team on April 25. On June 5, he made his first start in approximately three years in a game against the Hokkaido Nippon-Ham Fighters (at Es Con Field Hokkaido). He continued to be used as a starter and pinch hitter, and on September 2 against the Chunichi Dragons (at Vantelin Dome Nagoya), he hit his first home run in his eighth year as a professional career. He renewed his contract during the offseason with an estimated annual salary of 30 million yen, an increase of 11 million yen.

== Playing style ==
A 1.75 meter infielder, his 50-meter dash was clocked at 5.8 seconds while his farthest distance throw as recorded at 115 meters. In addition to being able to play all infield positions, he has also played in the outfield during his high school years and since joining the Hanshin Tigers. He was initially being groomed to be a switch hitter and was registered as such after his draft, but in 2019, he decided to focus on right-handed hitting and master it.

== Personal life ==
On November 30, 2022, he announced that he was married.

== Detailed information ==
=== Batting record by year ===
Year	Team	G	T P A	A B	R	H	2 B	3 B	H R	T B	R B I	S B	C S	S H	S F	B B	I B B	H B P	S O	G I D P	A V G	O B P	S L G	O P S
2018	Hanshin	19	18	13	10	3	0	0	0	3	2	3	1	3	0	2	0	0	3	1	.231	.333	.231	.564
2020	Hanshin	38	17	16	6	5	2	0	0	7	3	3	2	0	0	1	0	0	5	0	.313	.353	.438	.790
2021	Hanshin	73	6	5	13	0	0	0	0	0	0	7	1	1	0	0	0	0	1	0	.000	.000	.000	.000
2022	Hanshin	63	52	45	8	7	0	0	0	7	3	7	5	6	1	0	0	0	10	0	.156	.152	.156	.308
2023	Hanshin	26	9	6	7	2	0	0	0	2	0	3	1	1	0	2	0	0	2	0	.333	.500	.333	.833
2024	Hanshin	32	9	8	2	1	0	0	0	1	0	1	1	1	0	0	0	0	2	0	.125	.125	.125	.250
2025	Hanshin	85	170	156	22	35	2	3	1	46	18	6	4	8	0	5	0	1	33	5	.224	.253	.295	.548
Total		336	281	249	68	53	4	3	1	66	26	30	15	20	1	10	0	1	56	6	.213	.245	.265	.510

=== Defensive record by year ===
Year	Team	First baseman						Second baseman						Third baseman						Shortstop						Outfielder					
Year	Team	G	P O	A	E	D P	F P C T	G	P O	A	E	D P	F P C T	G	P O	A	E	D P	F P C T	G	P O	A	E	D P	F P C T	G	P O	A	E	D P	F P C T
2018	Hanshin	-						3	1	1	1	1	.667	-						7	8	6	2	2	.875	-					
2020	Hanshin	-						7	5	8	1	1	.929	12	4	3	1	0	.875	7	1	8	1	2	.900	-					
2021	Hanshin	-						3	1	1	0	0	1.000	7	0	4	0	0	1.000	-						47	14	0	0	0	1.000
2022	Hanshin	-						19	16	14	0	2	1.000	31	5	7	1	1	.923	-						9	0	0	0	0	----
2023	Hanshin	-						-						9	2	3	0	0	1.000	-						4	0	0	1	0	.000
2024	Hanshin	-						-						16	2	2	0	0	1.000	3	2	5	0	1	1.000	1	1	0	0	0	1.000
2025	Hanshin	6	6	1	0	2	1.000	2	1	2	0	0	1.000	20	11	11	0	0	1.000	32	45	75	0	13	1.000	21	26	2	0	0	1.000
Total		6	6	1	0	2	1.000	34	24	26	2	4	.962	95	24	30	2	1	.964	49	56	94	3	18	.980	82	41	2	1	0	.977

=== Records ===
First record

- First appearance: May 19, 2018, 10th round against Chunichi Dragons (Nagoya Dome), participated in the top of the 8th inning as a pinch runner for Fumihito Haraguchi
- First stolen base: The same game as above, second stolen in the top of the 8th inning (pitcher: Hiroshi Suzuki, catcher: Shota Ohno)
- First at-bat/first hit: May 27, 2018, against Yomiuri Giants 12th round (Hanshin Koshien Stadium)), a single to left from Shun Ikeda in the bottom of the 8th inning
- First appearance: June 21, 2018, against Orix Buffaloes 3rd round (Hanshin Koshien Stadium), starting as batting second, shortstop
- First RBI: June 30, 2018, against Tokyo Yakult Swallows 8th round (Meiji Jingu Stadium), an RBI single to right from David Huff in the top of the 2nd inning
- First Home run: September 2, 2025, against Chunichi Dragons 18th round (Vantelin Dome Nagoya), a two-run home run over left field from Kyle Muller in the top of the 3nd inning

=== Uniform number ===
- 4 (2018 -)
