= Tatsuki Mizuno =

Japanese baseball player (born 2000)

Tatsuki Mizuno 水野 達稀
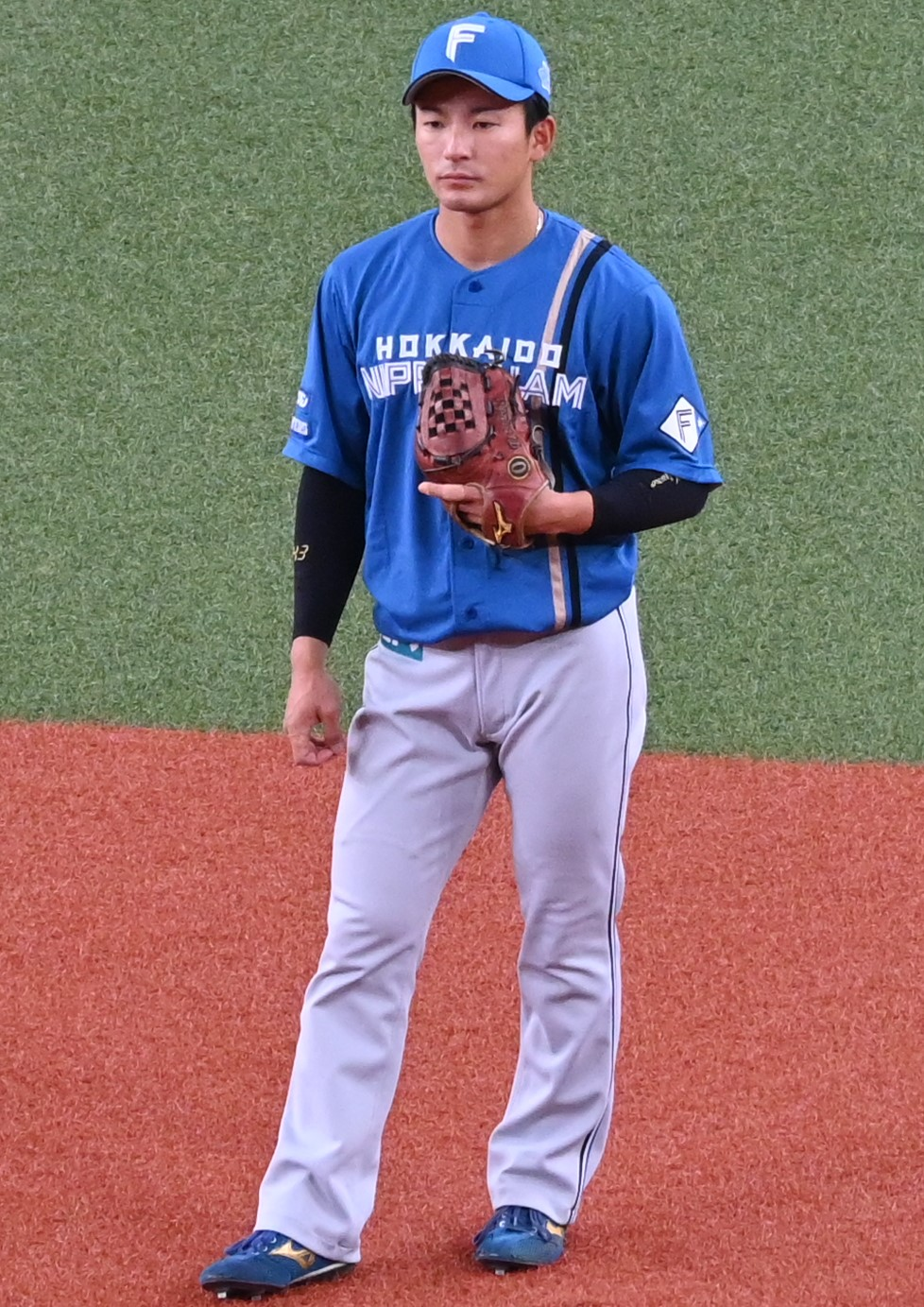

Hokkaido Nippon-Ham Fighters – No. 43
- Infielder
- Born: July 30, 2000 (age 25); Marugame, Kagawa, Japan
- Bats: Left Throws: Right

NPB debut
- March 25, 2022, for the Hokkaido Nippon-Ham Fighters

Career statistics (through 2025 season)
- Batting average: .221
- Home runs: 15
- RBI: 82
- Hits: 160
- Stolen bases: 16
- Stats at Baseball Reference

Teams
- Hokkaido Nippon-Ham Fighters (2022–present)

Career highlights and awards
- NPB All-Star (2024)

Tatsuki Mizuno (水野 達稀, Mizuno Tatsuki; born July 30, 2000 in Marugame, Kagawa, Japan) is a Japanese professional baseballinfielder for the Hokkaido Nippon-Ham Fighters of Nippon Professional Baseball (NPB).
