= Kentarō Taira =

Japanese baseball player (born 1995)

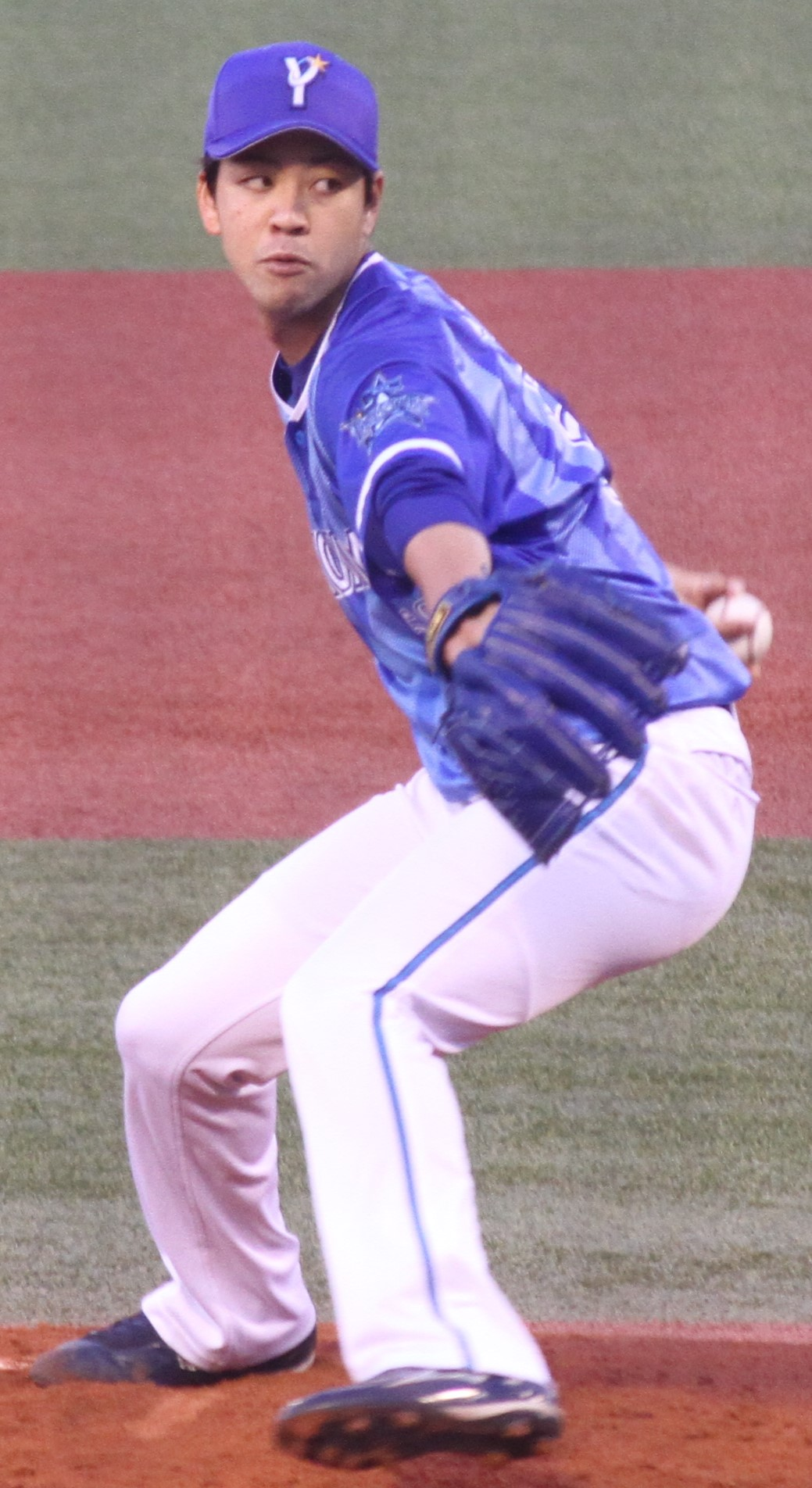

Yokohama DeNA BayStars – No. 59
- Pitcher
- Born: July 12, 1995 (age 30); Kakuda, Miyagi, Japan
- Bats: Right Throws: Right

NPB debut
- April 7, 2016, for the Yomiuri Giants

Career statistics (through 2023 season)
- Win–loss record: 19-23
- ERA: 3.46
- Strikeouts: 250
- Stats at Baseball Reference

Teams
- Yomiuri Giants (2014–2016); Yokohama DeNA BayStars (2017–present)

Kentarō Taira (平良 拳太郎, Taira Kentarō; born July 12, 1995) is a professional Japanese baseball player. He plays pitcher for the Yokohama DeNA BayStars. He has previously played in NPB for the Yomiuri Giants.
