= Shugo Maki =

Japanese baseball player (born 1998)

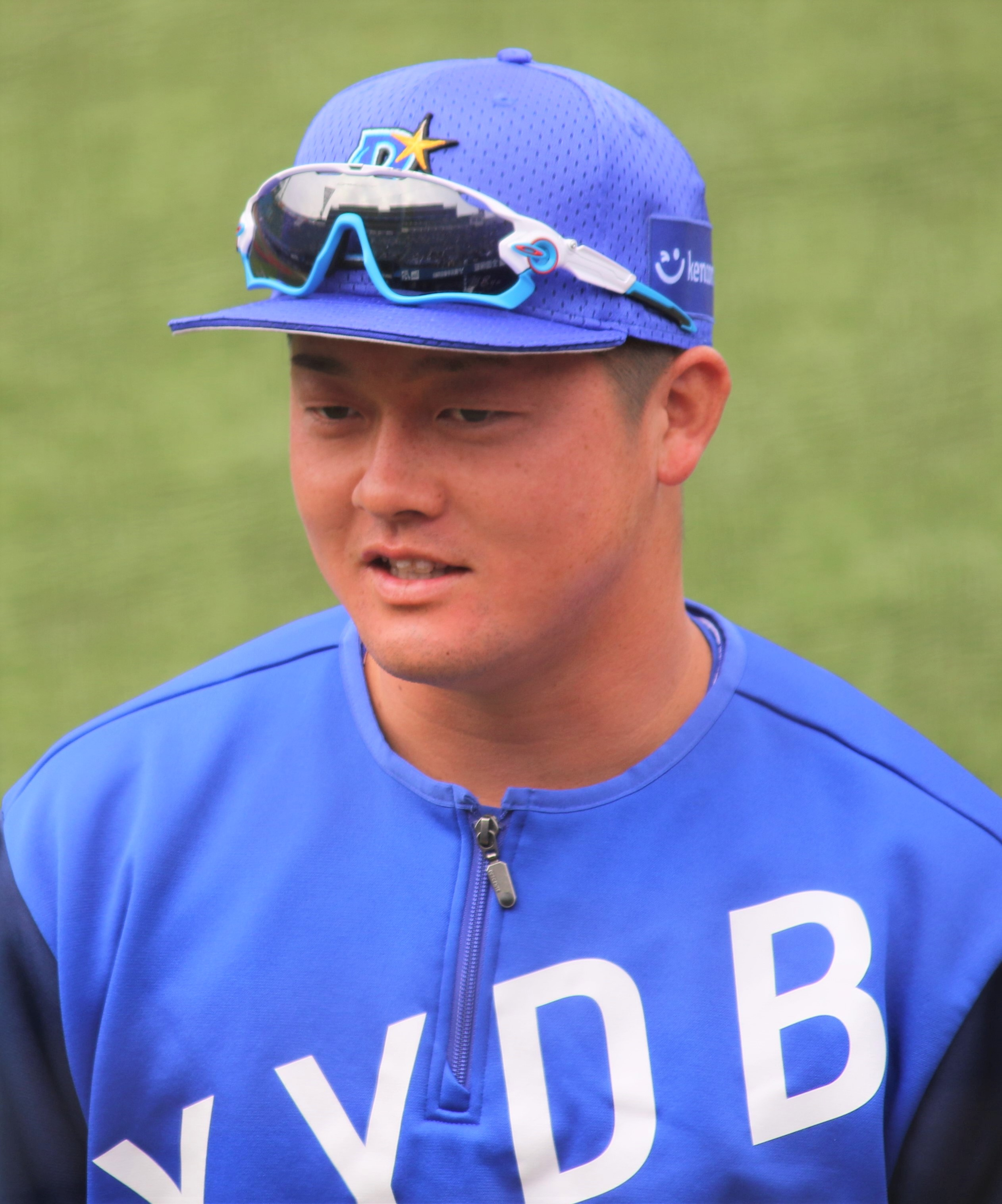
- Maki with the Yokohama DeNA BayStars

Yokohama DeNA BayStars – No. 2
- Infielder
- Born: 21 April 1998 (age 28); Nakano, Nagano, Japan
- Bats: Right Throws: Right

NPB debut
- 26 March, 2021, for the Yokohama DeNA BayStars

NPB statistics (through August 1, 2026)
- Batting average: .294
- Home runs: 131
- Runs batted in: 430
- Stats at Baseball Reference

Teams
- Yokohama DeNA BayStars (2021–present)

Career highlights and awards
- Japan Series champion (2024); Central League Federation Special Award (2021); 4× NPB All-Star (2022–2025); 2× Best Nine Award (2022, 2023)
Medals
Men's baseball
Representing Japan
World Baseball Classic
Gold medal – first place	2023 Miami	Team
WBSC Premier12
Silver medal – second place	2024	Team

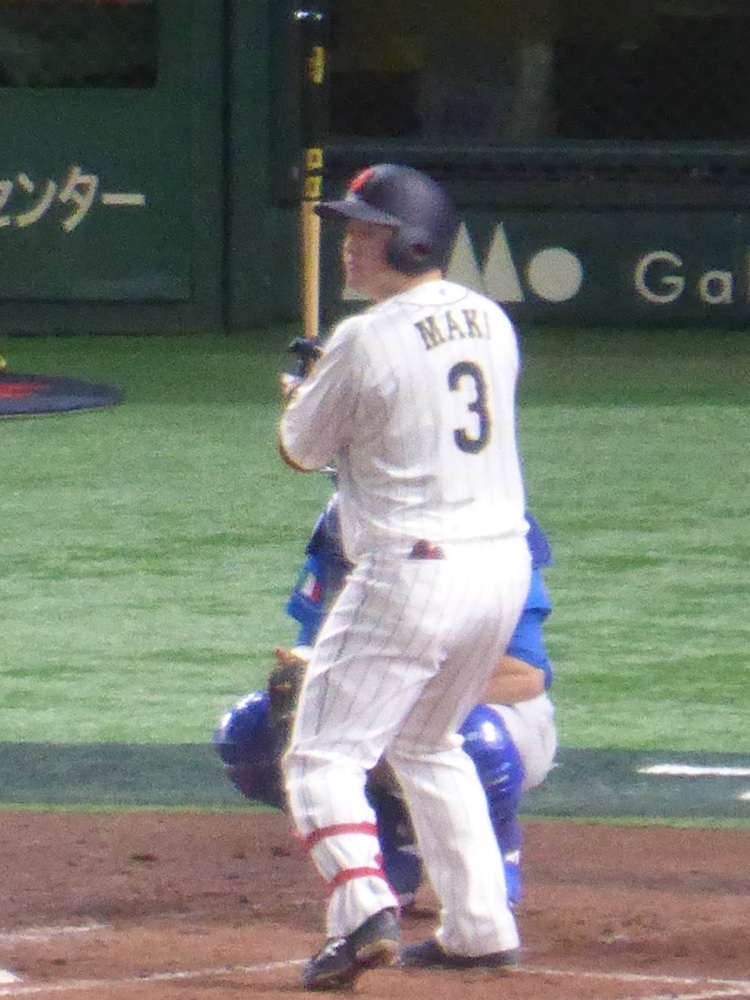
Maki with the WBC Japan national team at Tokyo Dome on March 16, 2023

Shugo Maki (牧 秀悟, Maki Shugo; born 21 April 1998) is a Japanese professional baseball infielder for the Yokohama DeNA BayStars of Nippon Professional Baseball (NPB).

== Career ==
=== Before turning pro ===
He started playing baseball in the first grade at Nakano Municipal Nakano Elementary School when his older brother joined the King Animals, a baseball team for third grade and above, and started batting fourth in the fall of his second grade year. Since his parents were both working, he spent his days practicing baseball with his grandfather, who had a net set up in the yard where he practiced hitting every day. When he was a student at Nannomiya Junior High School in Nakano, he was a member of Wakaho Little Senior, and although it was a newly established team, it participated in national tournaments in its second and third years.

At Matsumoto Daiichi High School, he was a center fielder from the spring of his freshman year and won the prefectural tournament in the spring of his junior year, but lost the first game of both the summer of his sophomore and junior years. In high school, two grades above him was Daiki Momose.

In the professional baseball draft held on 26 October 2020, he was selected in the second round by the Yokohama DeNA BayStars. He tentatively signed a contract for 77 million yen and an annual salary of 13 million yen (amount is estimated). His number is 2.

On 22 December 2020, he was awarded the Nakano City Honor Award.

== Personal life ==
His family runs a beauty salon in Nakano City, Nagano Prefecture.

When he hits a home run, he performs "Destasha," a performance that mimics the pose of YouTuber duo SAWAYAN.

Off 2022, he announced his marriage to a female classmate whom he had been dating since college.
