= Masumi Hamachi =

Japanese baseball player (born 1998)

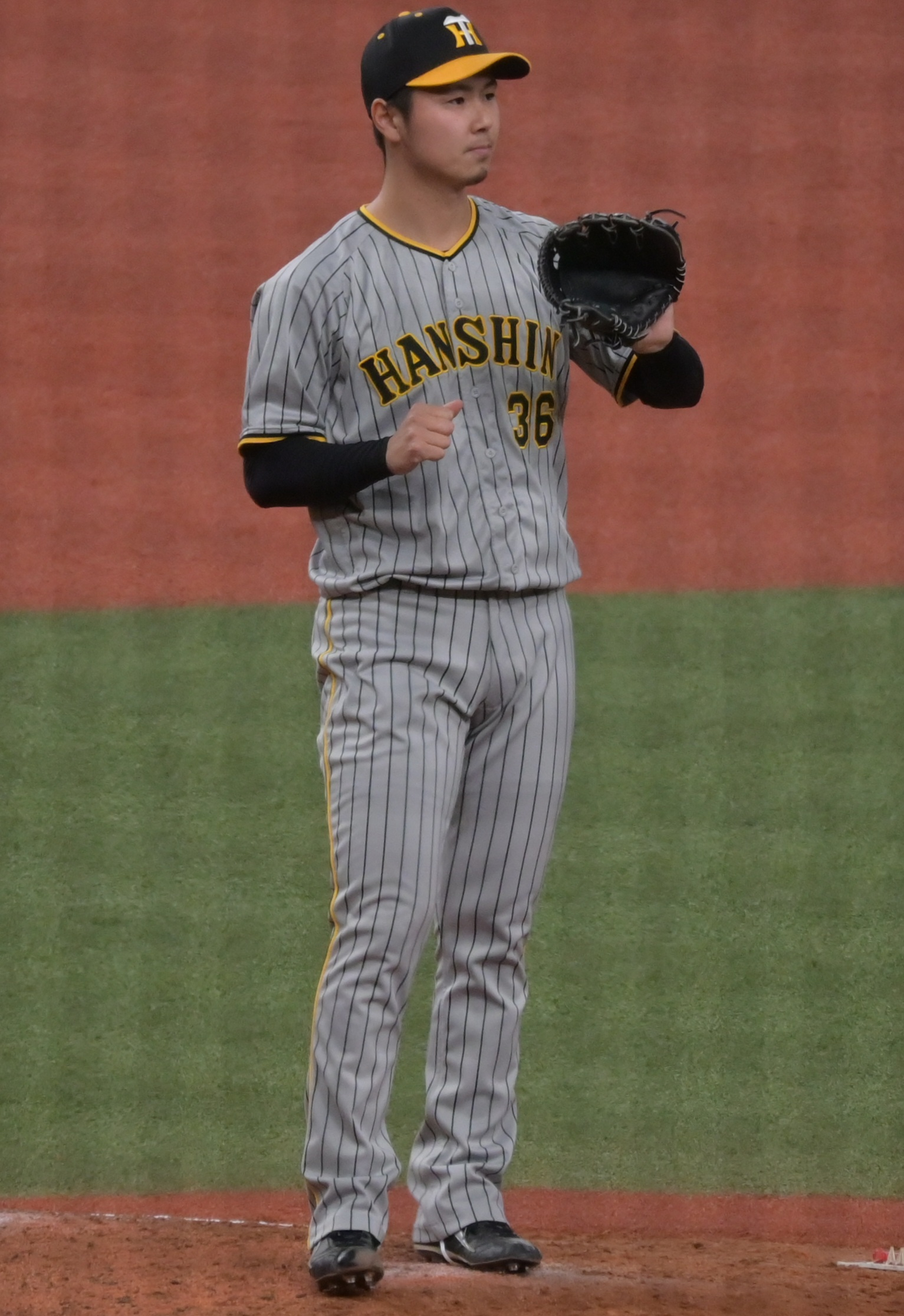

Yokohama DeNA BayStars – No. 52
- Pitcher
- Born: May 25, 1998 (age 28); Nishi-ku, Fukuoka, Japan
- Bats: Right Throws: Right

NPB debut
- April 4, 2019, for the Hanshin Tigers

Career statistics (through August 1, 2026)
- Win–loss record: 6–5
- Earned run average: 3.35
- Strikeouts: 114
- Stats at Baseball Reference

Teams
- Hanshin Tigers (2019–2024); Yokohama DeNA BayStars (2025-present)

Masumi Hamachi (浜地 真澄, Hamachi Masumi; born May 25, 1998, in Nishi-ku, Fukuoka, Japan) is a professional Japanese baseball player. He is a pitcher for the Yokohama DeNA BayStars of Nippon Professional Baseball (NPB).
