= Sean Reynolds (baseball) =

American baseball player (born 1998)

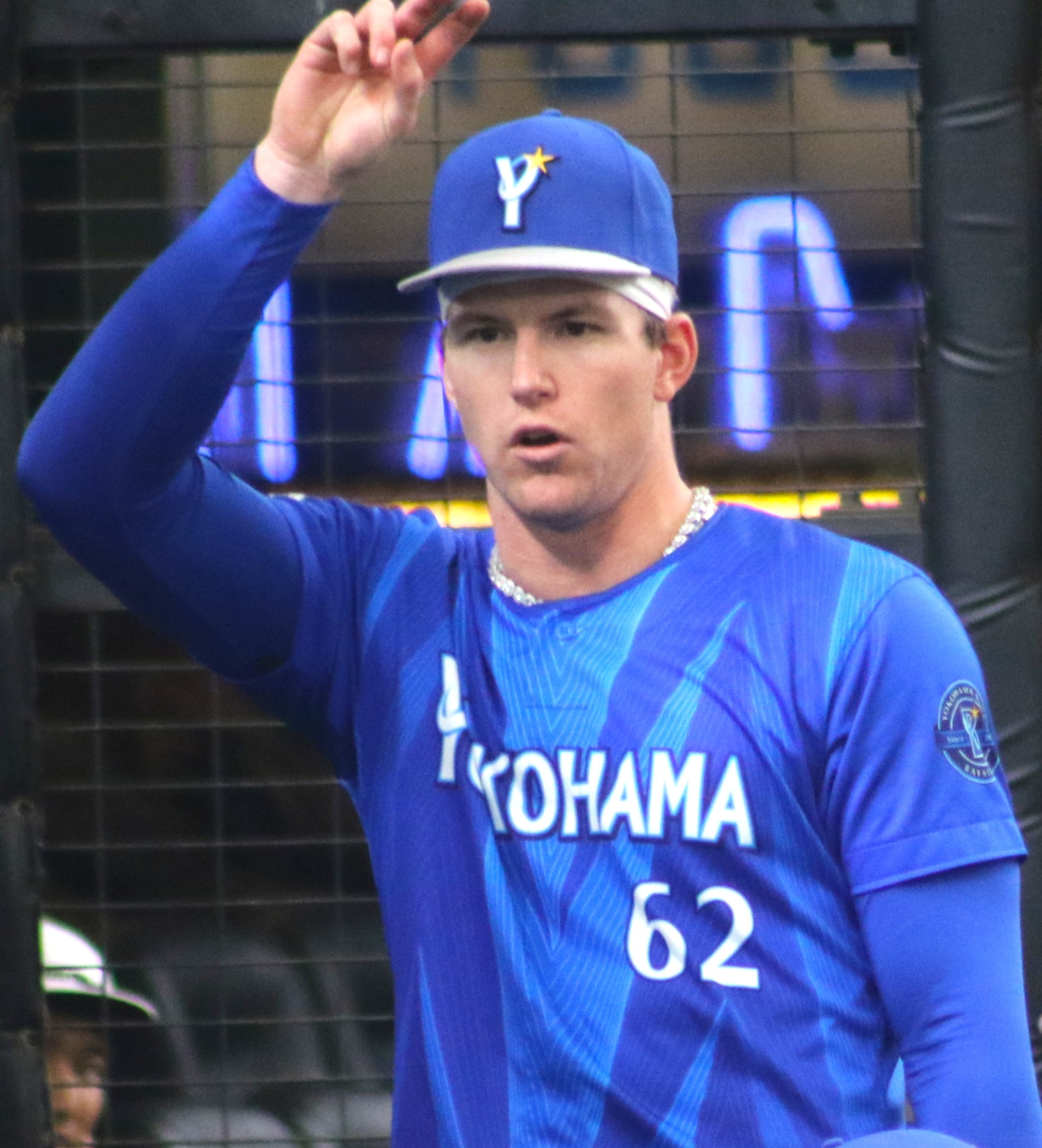
- Reynolds with the Yokohama DeNA BayStars

Yokohama DeNA BayStars – No. 62
- Pitcher
- Born: April 19, 1998 (age 28); Redondo Beach, California, U.S.
- Bats: Left Throws: Right

Professional debut
- MLB: July 14, 2024, for the San Diego Padres
- NPB: March 29, 2026, for the Yokohama DeNA BayStars

MLB statistics (through 2025 season)
- Win–loss record: 0–1
- Earned run average: 4.03
- Strikeouts: 46

NPB statistics (through August 18, 2026)
- Win–loss record: 3–0
- Earned run average: 1.14
- Strikeouts: 67
- Saves: 9
- Stats at Baseball Reference

Teams
- San Diego Padres (2024–2025); Yokohama DeNA BayStars (2026–present)

Sean William Reynolds (born April 19, 1998) is an American professional baseball pitcher for the Yokohama DeNA BayStars of Nippon Professional Baseball (NPB). He has previously played in Major League Baseball (MLB) for the San Diego Padres.

== Career ==
=== Miami Marlins ===
Reynolds attended Redondo Union High School in Redondo Beach, California. He was drafted by the Miami Marlins in the fourth round, with the 113th overall selection, of the 2016 Major League Baseball draft. Reynolds made his professional debut with the rookie–level Gulf Coast League Marlins, batting .155 in 42 games.

Reynolds split the 2017 campaign between the GCL Marlins and Low–A Batavia Muckdogs, hitting .198/.269/.350 with five home runs and 24 RBI across 51 combined appearances. He returned to Batavia in 2018, playing in 76 games and slashing .193/.306/.441 with 17 home runs, 52 RBI, and 13 stolen bases. Reynolds split the 2019 season between Batavia and the Single–A Clinton LumberKings. In 96 games for the two affiliates, he accumulated a .172/.291/.348 batting line with 13 home runs, 45 RBI, and 11 stolen bases. Reynolds did not play in a game in 2020 due to the cancellation of the minor league season because of the COVID-19 pandemic.

After spending his first four years as a first baseman and outfielder, Reynolds converted into a pitcher in 2021. In 19 games for the Single–A Jupiter Hammerheads, he recorded a 2–1 record and 3.09 ERA with 37 strikeouts across 32 innings of work. Reynolds split the 2022 season between the High–A Beloit Sky Carp and Double–A Pensacola Blue Wahoos, compiling a cumulative 4.13 ERA and 66 strikeouts with 10 saves over 52 1/3 innings pitched.

On November 10, 2022, the Marlins added Reynolds to their 40-man roster to protect him from the Rule 5 draft. Reynolds was optioned to Double–A Pensacola to begin the 2023 season. In 31 appearance split between Pensacola and the Triple–A Jacksonville Jumbo Shrimp, he registered a cumulative 2.66 ERA with 47 strikeouts and 11 saves in 40 2/3 innings pitched. On July 7, 2023, Reynolds was promoted to the major leagues for the first time. He went unused out of the bullpen and was optioned back to Jacksonville on July 10, becoming a phantom ballplayer.

=== San Diego Padres ===
On August 1, 2023, Reynolds and Garrett Cooper were traded to the San Diego Padres in exchange for Ryan Weathers. He made 17 appearances for the Triple–A El Paso Chihuahuas, but struggled to a 13.50 ERA with 19 strikeouts in 16 innings.

Reynolds was optioned to Triple–A El Paso to begin the 2024 season. On July 12, 2024, Reynolds was promoted to the major leagues for the first time. He made nine appearances for San Diego during his rookie campaign, recording an 0.82 ERA with 21 strikeouts over 11 innings of work.

Reynolds made 19 appearances for the Padres in 2025, logging an 0–1 record and 5.33 ERA with 25 strikeouts over 27 innings of work. On November 21, 2025, he was non-tendered by San Diego and became a free agent.

=== Yokohama DeNA BayStars ===
On December 12, 2025, Reynolds signed with the Yokohama DeNA BayStars of Nippon Professional Baseball.
