= Taisei Kudō =

Japanese baseball player (born 2001)

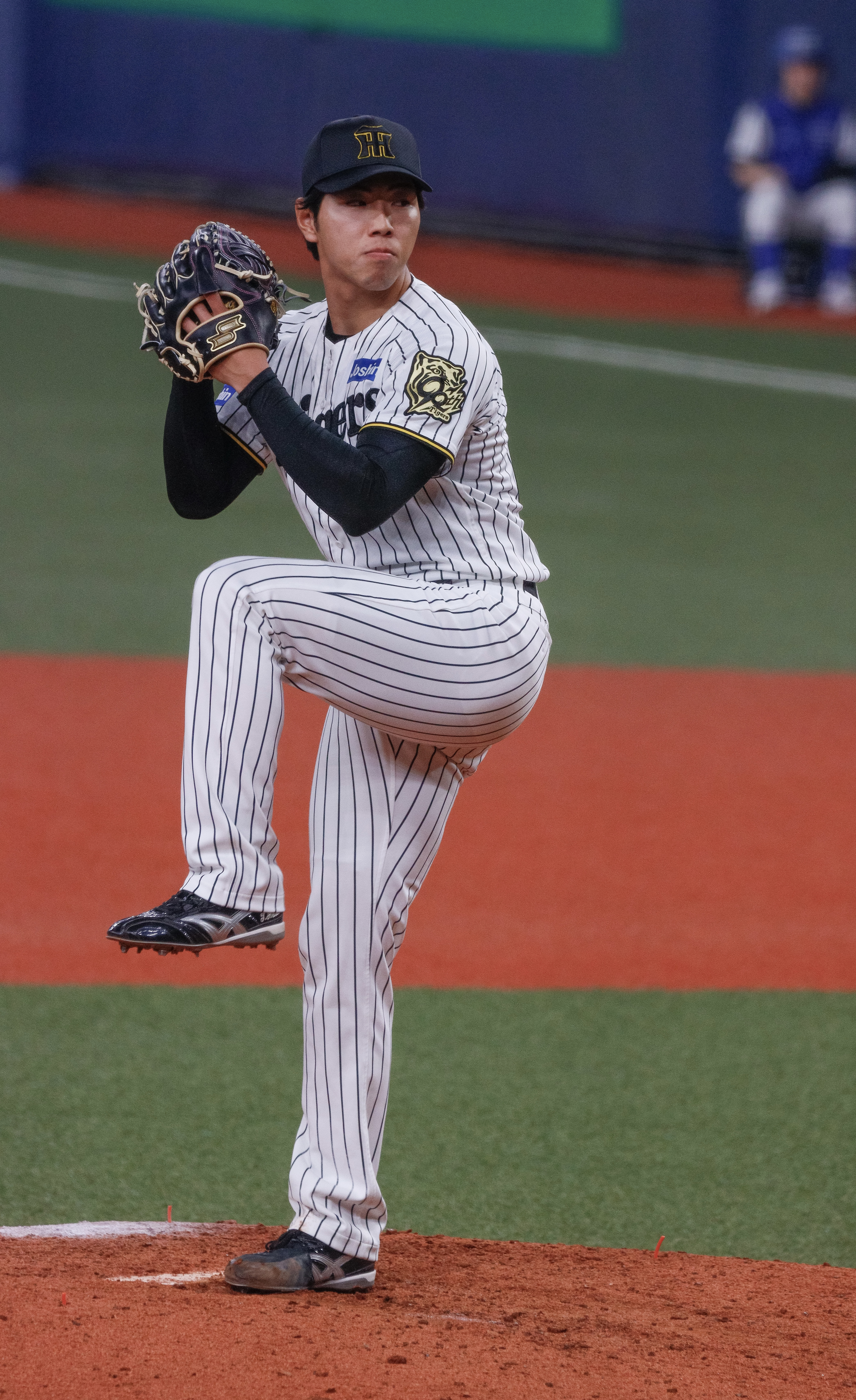

Hanshin Tigers – No. 49
- Pitcher
- Born: November 19, 2001 (age 24); Akita, Akita, Japan
- Bats: Left Throws: Right

NPB debut
- March 29, 2025, for the Hanshin Tigers

Teams
- Hanshin Tigers (2025–present)

Taisei Kudō (工藤 泰成, Kudō Taisei; born November 19, 2001) is a professional Japanese baseball player. He is a pitcher for the Hanshin Tigers of Nippon Professional Baseball (NPB).
