= Kosuke Baba =

Japanese baseball player (born 1995)

Kōsuke Baba
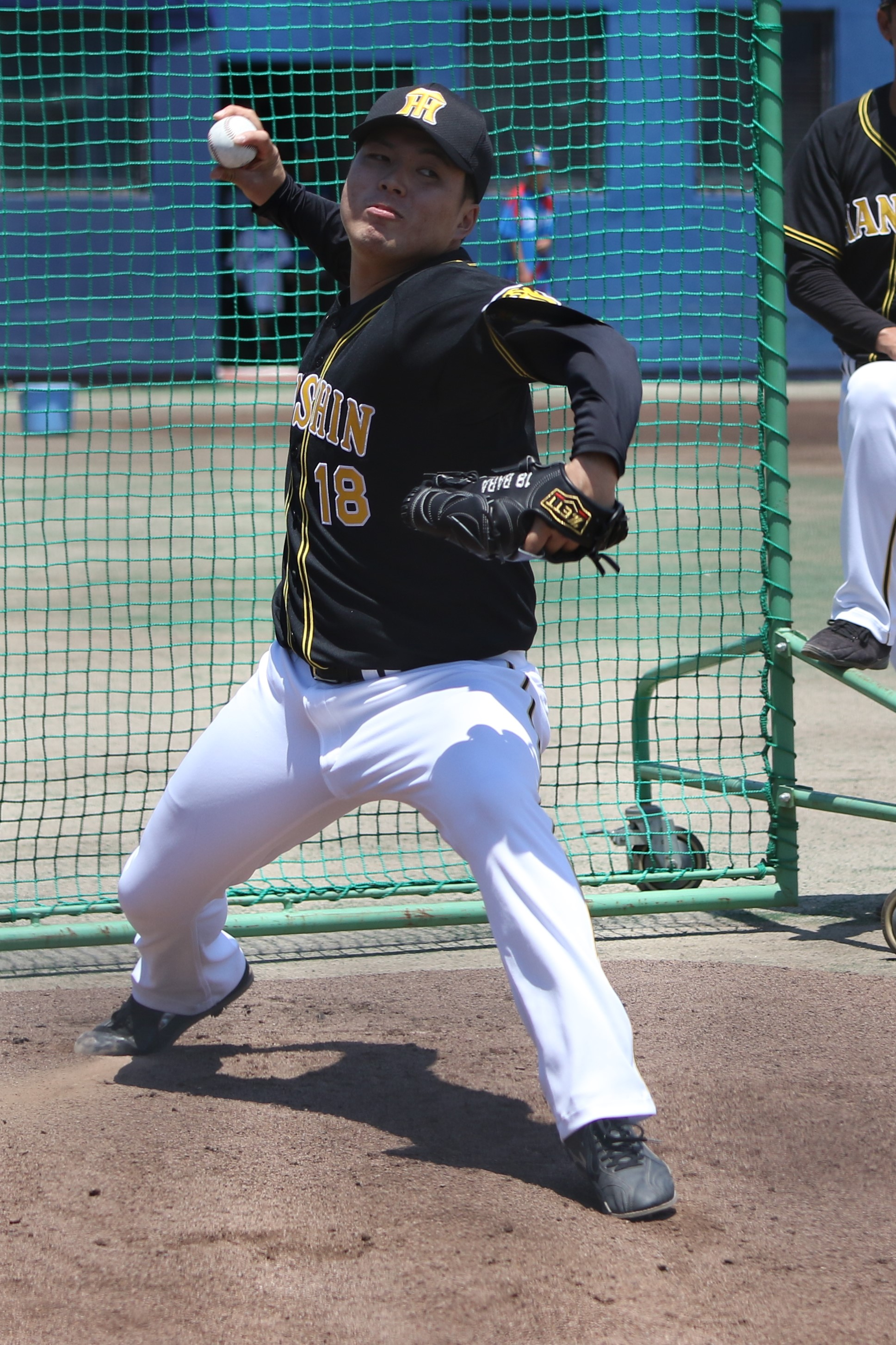
- Baba pitching for the Tigers

Yokohama DeNA BayStars – No. 96
- Pitcher
- Born: May 18, 1995 (age 31); Shiogama, Miyagi
- Bats: Right Throws: Right

NPB debut
- April 29, 2018, for the Hanshin Tigers

NPB statistics (through 2025 season)
- Win–loss record: 7–4
- Earned run average: 3.48
- Strikeouts: 112
- Saves: 0
- Holds: 22
- Stats at Baseball Reference

Teams
- Hanshin Tigers (2018–2023); Yomiuri Giants (2024–2025); Yokohama DeNA BayStars (2026-present)

Kōsuke Baba (馬場 皐輔, Baba, Kōsuke; born May 18, 1995) is a Japanese professional baseball pitcher for the Yokohama DeNA BayStars of Nippon Professional Baseball (NPB). He has previously played in NPB for the Hanshin Tigers and Yomiuri Giants.

== Early baseball career ==
Kōsuke started playing little league baseball for the Shiogama Dragons when he was in 3rd grade, and went on to play for the Shichigahama Seniors when he was in junior high.

He entered Sendai Ikuei Gakuen High School, a known baseball powerhouse in Miyagi. He spent the first two years as a benched player, but finally got the chance to take the mound against Waseda Jitsugyo in the 3rd round of the 2013 Spring Koshien tournaments. He pitched 7 innings and gave up only a single run to secure the win. Despite pitching four scoreless innings in relief during the quarter-finals, his team lost 0-2 against Kochi High's Ren Wada. During the same year's Summer Koshien Tournament, he was suddenly called to pitch in relief after the starter's shaky start in the 1st round against Urawa Gakuin High. After pitching five innings and scores tied at 10-10, his future Tigers teammate Takahiro Kumagai notched a walk-off hit in the bottom of the 9th to secure the win. They lost the 2nd round match against Joso Gakuin and didn't make it to the finals. During the two tournaments, he recorded 21 strikeouts and a 2.14 ERA in 4 games and 21 innings.

He progressed to Sendai University and regularly pitched in the Sendai Big 6 Universities Baseball League. He spent his freshman year pitching in relief to then-sophomore and ace pitcher Kento Kumabara, and helped his school win the autumn league championship with an ERA of 0.93. He then became a regular starter from his 2nd year, and became the team's ace pitcher in his 4th year. In his final autumn league, he notched a flawless 5-0 record as a starter, with a 0.49 ERA in 36 innings and a 14.59 strikeout rate (60 KOs), and once again helped his team secure the championship. He graduated from college with a 15-6 record from 32 games (167 innings), a 1.34 ERA and 206 strikeouts.

== Hanshin Tigers ==
He was the 1st round pick (3rd alternative choice) of both the Hanshin Tigers and the Fukuoka SoftBank Hawks in the 2017 Nippon Professional Baseball draft, after they both lost the lottery for Kotaro Kiyomiya and Hisanori Yasuda. The Tigers won the lottery and negotiation rights. He inked a 100 million yen contract with the Tigers for a 15 million yen annual salary, and was assigned the jersey number 18. His former high school teammate Takahiro Kumagai was the 3rd round pick of the same draft.

== Yomiuri Giants ==
On December 8, 2023, he was determined to transfer to the Yomiuri Giants in the active player draft.
