= Chusei Mannami =

Japanese baseball player (born 2000)

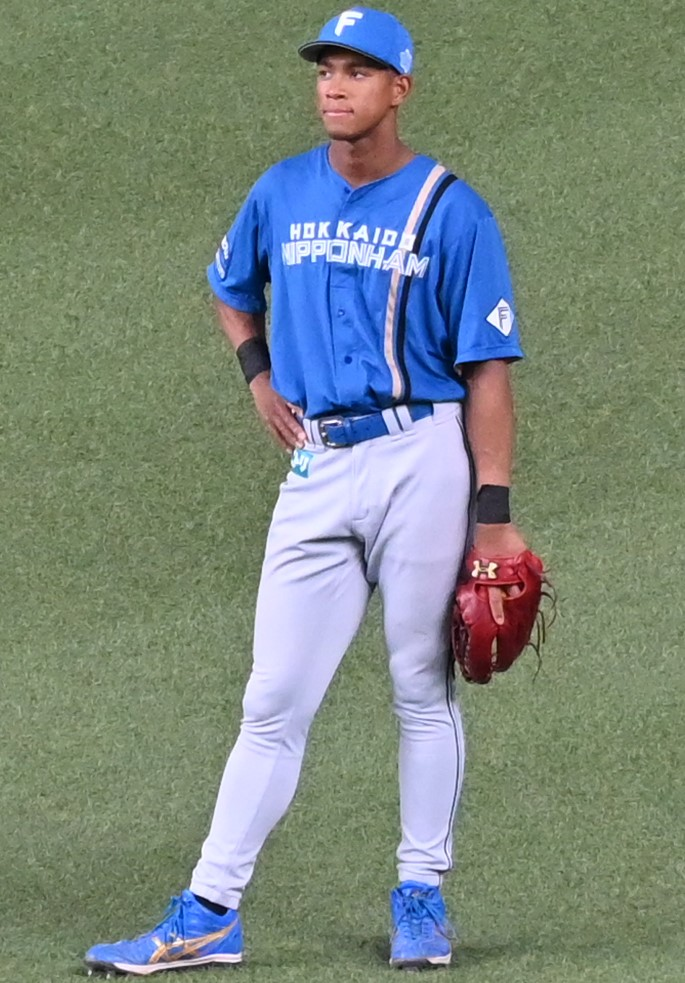
- Mannami with the Hokkaido Nippon Ham Fighters

Hokkaido Nippon Ham Fighters – No. 66
- Outfielder
- Born: April 7, 2000 (age 26); Nerima, Tokyo, Japan
- Bats: Right Throws: Right

NPB debut
- August 14, 2019, for the Hokkaido Nippon-Ham Fighters

NPB statistics (through 2025 season)
- Batting average: .238
- Hits: 450
- Home runs: 82
- Runs batted in: 243
- Stats at Baseball Reference

Teams
- Hokkaido Nippon-Ham Fighters (2019–present)

Career highlights and awards
- 3× NPB All-Star (2023–2025); NPB All-Star Game MVP (2023); Best Nine Award (2023); 2× Golden Glove Award (2023, 2024)
Medals
Men's baseball
Representing Japan
WBSC Premier12
Silver medal – second place	2024	Team

Chusei Mannami (万波 中正, Mannami Chūsei; born April 7, 2000) is a Congolese-Japanese professional baseball outfielder for the Hokkaido Nippon-Ham Fighters of Nippon Professional Baseball (NPB). He was born to a Japanese mother and a father from the Democratic Republic of the Congo.
