= Torai Fushimi =

Japanese baseball player (born 1990)

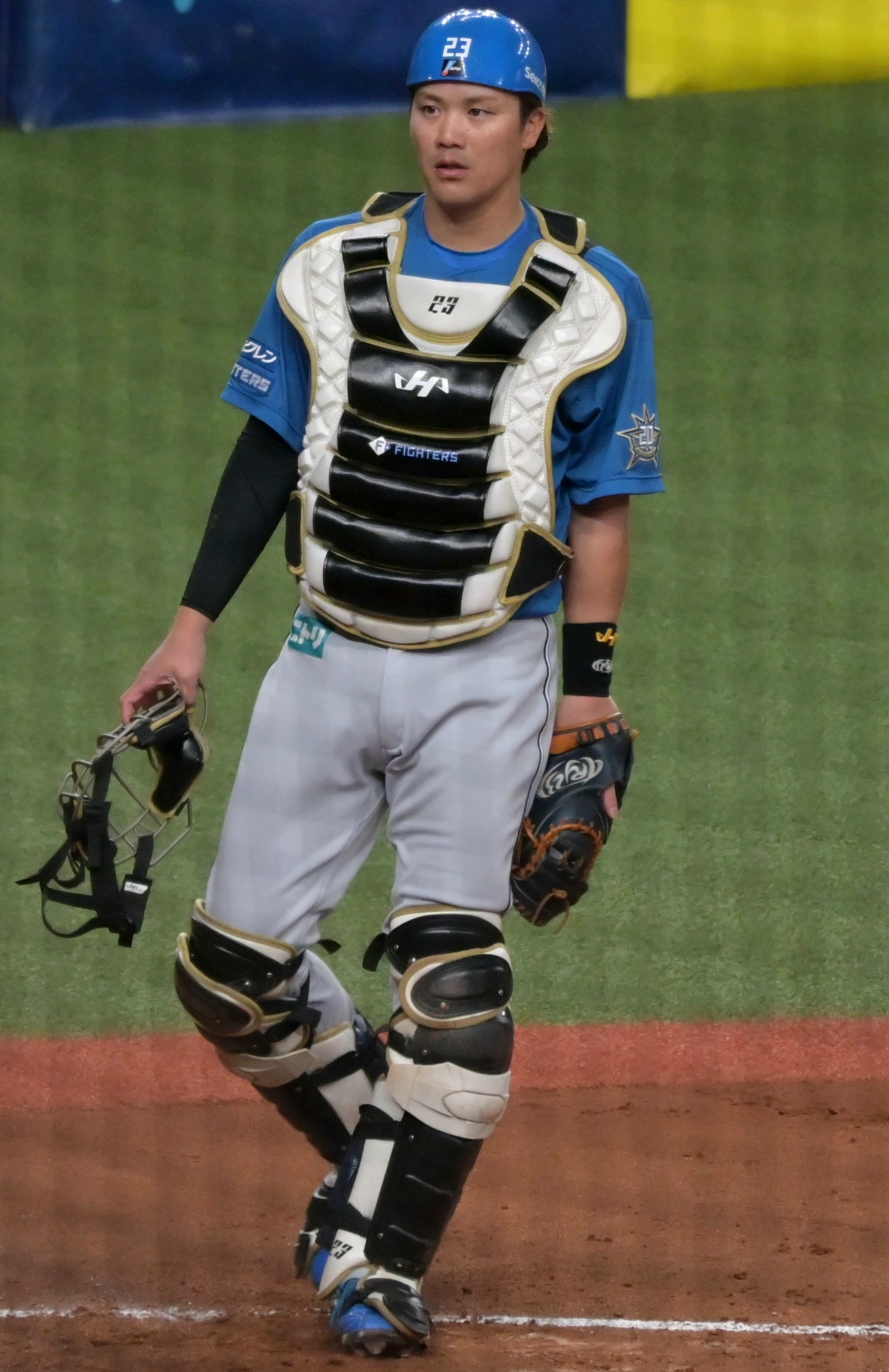
- Fushimi with the Hokkaido Nippon-Ham Fighters

Hanshin Tigers – No. 17
- Catcher
- Born: May 12, 1990 (age 36)
- Bats: Right Throws: Right

NPB debut
- April 29, 2013, for the Orix Buffaloes

NPB statistics (through 2025 season)
- Batting average: .233
- Home runs: 21
- Hits: 354
- RBI: 142
- Stats at Baseball Reference

Teams
- Orix Buffaloes (2013–2022); Hokkaido Nippon-Ham Fighters (2023–2025); Hanshin Tigers (2026–present)

Career highlights and awards
- Japan Series champion (2022)

Torai Fushimi (伏見 寅威, Fushimi Torai; born May 12, 1990 in Chitose, Hokkaido, Japan) is a Japanese professional baseball catcher for the Hanshin Tigers of Nippon Professional Baseball (NPB). He has previously played in NPB for the Orix Buffaloes and the Hokkaido Nippon-Ham Fighters.

== Career ==
=== Orix Buffaloes ===
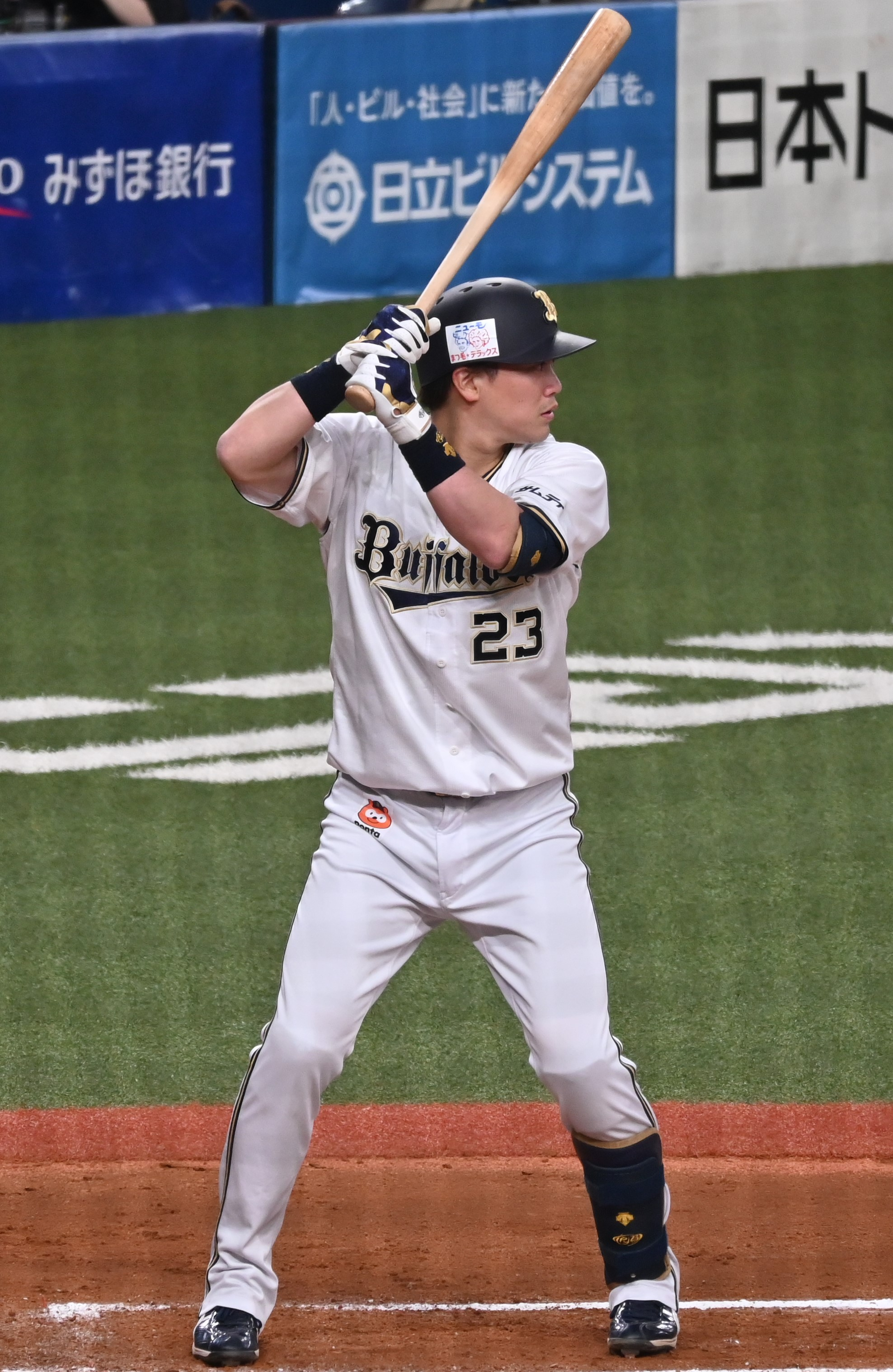
Fushimi for the Buffaloes at Kyocera Dome Osaka(April 15, 2022)

Fushimi spent the 2013 to 2022 seasons with the Orix Buffaloes, winning the Japan Series with the team in 2022.

=== Hokkaido Nippon-Ham Fighters ===
On November 19, 2022, Fushimi signed with the Hokkaido Nippon-Ham Fighters of Nippon Professional Baseball (NPB).

=== Hanshin Tigers ===
In the 2025 offseason he was traded to the Hanshin Tigers.
