= 2024 Central League Climax Series =

Japanese professional baseball postseason

First stage
Team (Wins)		Manager	Season
Yokohama DeNA BayStars (2)		Daisuke Miura	71–69–3 (.507), 8 GB
Hanshin Tigers (0)		Akinobu Okada	74–63–6 (.540), 3½ GB
- Dates: October 12–13

Final stage
Team (Wins)		Manager	Season
Yokohama DeNA BayStars (4)		Daisuke Miura	71–69–3 (.507), 8 GB
Yomiuri Giants (3)		Shinnosuke Abe	77–59–7 (.566), 3½ GA
- Dates: October 16–21
- MVP: Yasutaka Tobashira (DeNA)

The 2024 Central League Climax Series was a set of two consecutive playoff series in Nippon Professional Baseball (NPB). The first stage began on October 12 and the final stage concluded on October 21. The first stage was a best-of-three series between the second-place Hanshin Tigers and the third-place Yokohama DeNA BayStars. The final stage was a best-of-six against the Yomiuri Giants, the Central League champion, being awarded a one-win advantage against the BayStars, the eventual winner of the first stage. The BayStars advanced to the 2024 Japan Series to compete against the Fukuoka SoftBank Hawks, the winner of the 2024 Pacific League Climax Series.

== Background ==
For the fourth year in a row, JERA sponsored the naming rights for the Central League Climax Series, and it was officially known as the "2024 JERA Climax Series SE".

In their 90th anniversary season, the Yomiuri Giants clinched their first Central League (CL) championship in four years and 39th overall on September 28. Shinnosuke Abe led the Giants to the pennant in his first year as the team's manager. Despite struggling to score throughout the season, Yomiuri employed a defense-first style of baseball in which their pitchers and defense helped them to win the championship. After winning seven consecutive games in July which to help power, the team found themselves in first place at the end of the first half of the season. The top four teams in the CL, however, were only separated from each other by a total of 3½ games. At the end of August, the Hiroshima Toyo Carp were in first place narrowly ahead of the Giants. The Carp had a disastrous September, however, losing 20 of 25 games, and by the end of the month they had fallen from first place to fourth and were eliminated from the playoff race.

The Hanshin Tigers, the previous season's Japan Series winner, started slow and found themselves in fourth at the season's midpoint. At various points, Shota Morishita, Yusuke Oyama and Teruaki Sato were all removed from the active roster to spend time working on their hitting with the Hanshin's farm team. Batting improved in the second half, however, and the Tigers began closing the gap between them and first place. Two five-game winning streaks in September helped bring them within one game of the Giants. Hanshin started a two-game series with the first-place Giants starting on September 22 trailing them by two games. They won the first game and, with a chance to move into a first-place tie, lost the second game. The Tigers went on to finish the season in second place. In the break between the end of the regular season and the start of the Climax Series, Akinobu Okada, Hanshin's manager, announced that he would retire at the end of the season.

As the season came to a close, Hiroshima continued to lose. A fourth Carp loss in a row on October 2 confirmed that the Yokohama DeNA BayStars would clinch third place and their third straight trip to the Climax Series. First-year team captain Shugo Maki and eventual 2024 batting champion Tyler Austin powered the DeNA offense, while ace Katsuki Azuma led the pitching staff with thirteen wins. From the start of the season, Azuma won eight straight games, helping the BayStars to reach second places by the end of June. A month later, however, the team was in the midst of a nine-game losing streak and found themselves knocked down to fourth. Still in fourth and outside of Climax Series qualification, Maki introduced the motto "determined to win" to the team on August 27. The BayStars immediately went on a five-game win streak and finished the next month with a September record of 11–9–1. This push along with Hiroshima's fall won DeNA a playoff appearance.

== First stage ==
Intra-league teams play 25 games against each other during the regular season. The Tigers narrowly won the season series against the BayStars 13–11–1 and finished 4½ games ahead of DeNA. The two teams have only met in the postseason three times prior to this year, with the Tigers winning two of the three series. A best-of-three series, all games in the first stage were hosted by Hanshin, the higher seeded team, at their home ballpark, Koshien Stadium.

=== Summary ===
DeNA won the series, 2–0.

Game	Date	Score	Location	Time	Attendance
1	October 12	Yokohama DeNA BayStars – 3, Hanshin Tigers – 1	Koshien Stadium	3:19	42,642
2	October 13	Yokohama DeNA BayStars – 10, Hanshin Tigers – 3	Koshien Stadium	3:35	42,646

=== Game 1 ===
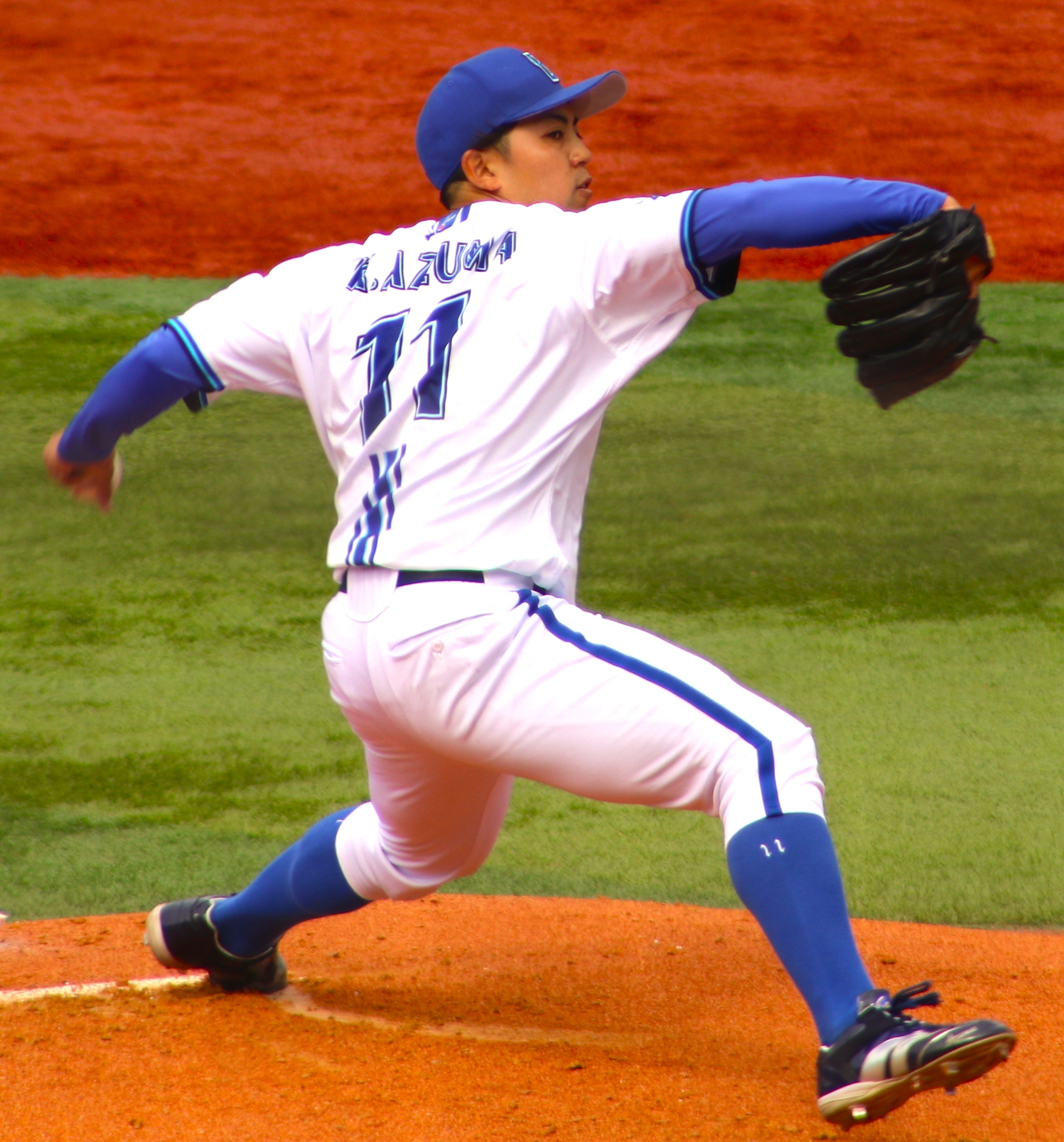
Katsuki Azuma was injured in the fourth inning of Game 1.

Saturday, October 12, 2024, 2:01 pm (JST) at Koshien Stadium in Nishinomiya, Hyōgo Prefecture
Team	1	2	3	4	5	6	7	8	9	R	H	E
DeNA	0	0	1	0	0	0	2	0	0	3	10	0
Hanshin	0	0	0	0	0	0	0	0	1	1	7	1
WP: Yasuaki Yamasaki (1–0) LP: Hiroto Saiki (0–1) Sv: Kohei Morihara (1); Attendance: 42,642; Boxscore

Katsuki Azuma was the Game 1 starting pitcher for DeNA, while Hiroto Saiki started for Hanshin. The BayStars loaded the bases against Saiki with only one out in the third inning and Masayuki Kuwahara drove in a run with an infield ground ball to give them a 1–0 lead. Azuma reached base on a single down the left field line in the top of the fourth inning, however he hurt his left hamstring while running the bases and was removed from the game after pitching through the bottom of the inning. The injury ensured that he would not be available to play for the entirety of the final stage. Hanshin's Saiki left the game after the fifth inning after giving up seven hits and one run. Relief pitcher Takuma Kirishiki was brought in to replace him and pitched a scoreless sixth inning. The next inning, he recorded one out before giving up two consecutive hits and was replaced by Daichi Ishii. With runners on first and third bases, Ishii allowed Tyler Austin to double and drive in both DeNA runners, widening the BayStars' lead to 3–0.

After Azuma's exit, DeNA used five relief pitchers to close out the remainder of the game. They held the Tigers to only one run in five innings to secure the win. Hanshin's lone run came in the ninth inning from a single by Seiya Kinami off of DeNA closer Kohei Morihara.

=== Game 2 ===
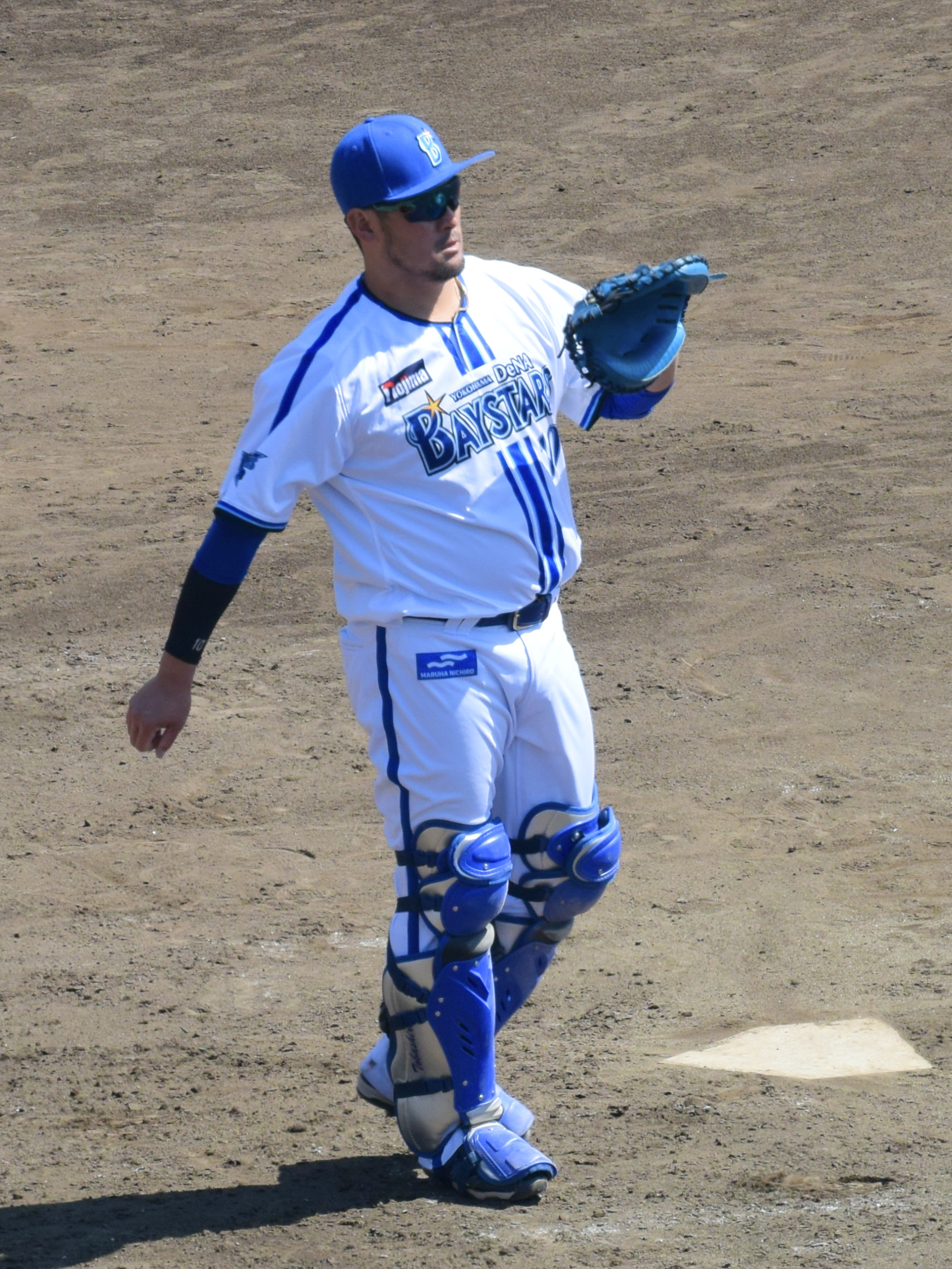
Yasutaka Tobashira had five RBIs in Game 2.

Sunday, October 13, 2024, 2:01 pm (JST) at Koshien Stadium in Nishinomiya, Hyōgo Prefecture
Team	1	2	3	4	5	6	7	8	9	R	H	E
DeNA	0	4	0	0	0	0	6	0	0	10	15	0
Hanshin	1	0	0	0	0	0	1	0	1	3	8	0
WP: Andre Jackson (1–0) LP: Haruto Takahashi (0–1); Home runs: DNA: Mike Ford (1), Keita Sano (1); HAN: Shota Morishita (1), Fumihito Haraguchi (1); Attendance: 42,646; Boxscore

Andre Jackson started Game 2 for DeNA and Haruto Takahashi started for Hanshin. The Tigers took the lead early after Jackson gave up a solo home run to Shota Morishita in the first inning. Jackson wouldn't allow another run in his 5 2/3-inning outing in which he struck out nine batters. Takahashi, however, allowed the BayStars to score four runs in the second inning. Three of the runs came via a Yasutaka Tobashira double after three consecutive hits loaded the bases. Shugo Maki later singled that inning to drive Tobashira home, extending their lead to 4–1. DeNA tacked on six more runs in the seventh inning when pinch hitter Mike Ford hit a solo home run followed by a three-run home run by Keita Sano later in the inning, putting the game out of reach for Hanshin and securing DeNA's advancement to the final stage.

== Final stage ==
As winners of the Central League, the Yomiuri Giants advanced directly to the final stage of the Climax Series to host the BayStars, the eventual winner of the first stage. In the season series, Yomiuri came out on top 16–8–1 and finished 8 games ahead of DeNA. The two teams had only played each other once previously in the Climax Series, the first stage of the 2016 CLCS, a series in which the BayStars won two games to one. For the final stage, the CL champion Giants were awarded a one-game advantage over the BayStars. A best-of-six series, all games in the final stage were hosted by Yomiuri, the higher seeded team, at their home ballpark, Tokyo Dome.

=== Summary ===
DeNA won the series, 4–3*.

Game	Date	Score	Location	Time	Attendance
1	October 16	Yokohama DeNA BayStars – 2, Yomiuri Giants – 0	Tokyo Dome	3:05	42,076
2	October 17	Yokohama DeNA BayStars – 2, Yomiuri Giants – 1	Tokyo Dome	2:31	42,006
3	October 18	Yokohama DeNA BayStars – 2, Yomiuri Giants – 1	Tokyo Dome	3:06	42,180
4	October 19	Yokohama DeNA BayStars – 1, Yomiuri Giants – 4	Tokyo Dome	2:54	42,222
5	October 20	Yokohama DeNA BayStars – 0, Yomiuri Giants – 1	Tokyo Dome	2:40	42,152
6	October 21	Yokohama DeNA BayStars – 3, Yomiuri Giants – 2	Tokyo Dome	3:43	41,856

* The Central League regular season champion is given a one-game advantage in the final stage.

=== Game 1 ===
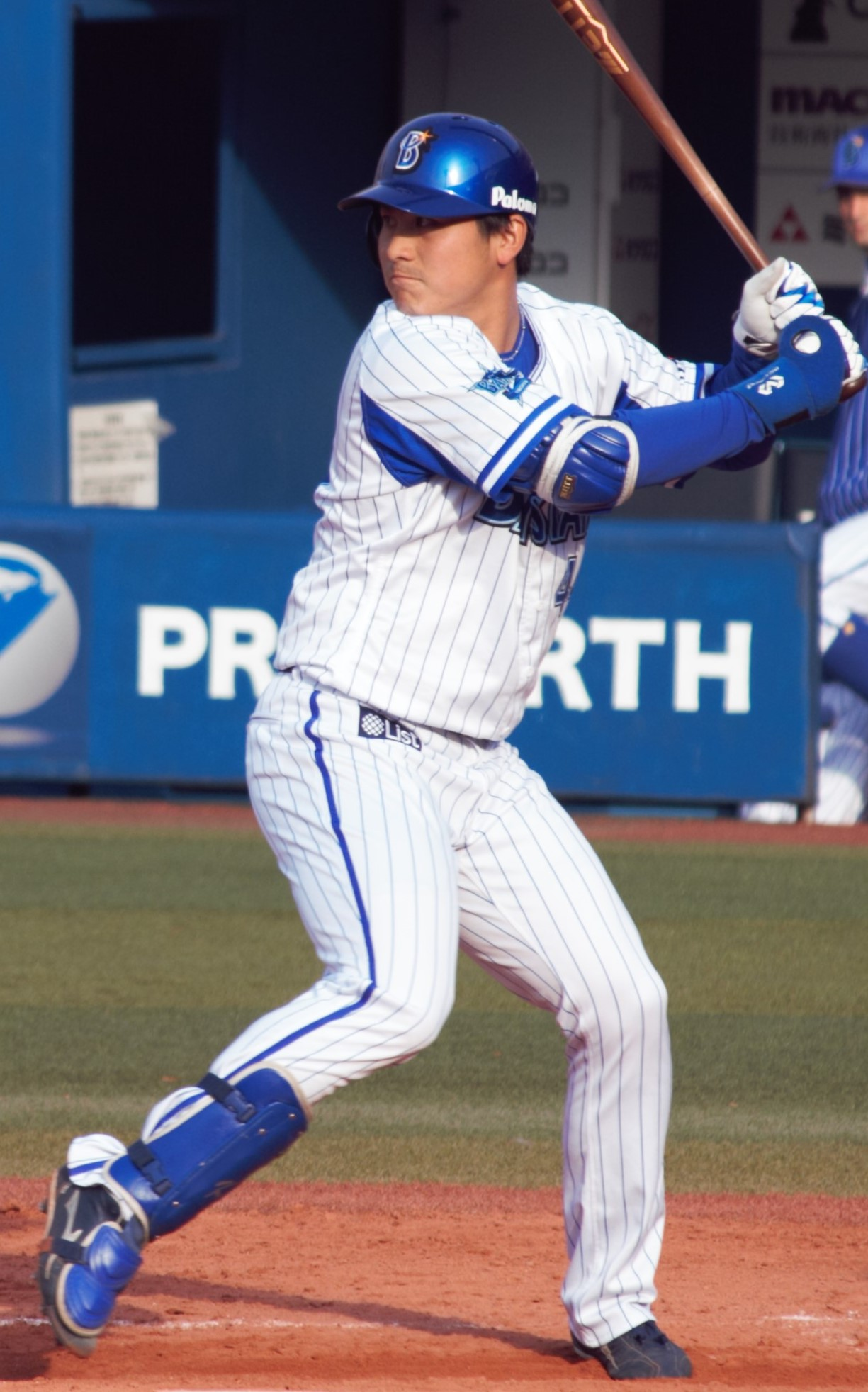
Keita Sano hit a home run in Game 1.

Wednesday, October 16, 2024, 6:00 pm (JST) at Tokyo Dome in Bunkyō, Tokyo
Team	1	2	3	4	5	6	7	8	9	R	H	E
DeNA	0	0	0	1	0	0	1	0	0	2	7	0
Yomiuri	0	0	0	0	0	0	0	0	0	0	4	0
WP: Anthony Kay (1–0) LP: Shosei Togo (0–1) Sv: Hiromu Ise (1); Home runs: DNA: Keita Sano (1); YOM: None; Attendance: 42,076; Boxscore

Olympic gold medalist Greco-Roman wrestler Nao Kusaka threw out the ceremonial first pitch. Anthony Kay was the starting pitcher for DeNA, while Shosei Togo started for Yomiuri. In the first inning, Kay issued two walks to Giants batters, but made it through the inning unscathed. He went on to pitch six innings without allowing a run and gave up only one hit. The BayStars opened the scoring when Keita Sano led off the fourth inning with a solo home run. In the seventh inning, Togo was replaced by Yuhei Takanashi after he allowed runners on first and third bases with only one out. Takanashi promptly gave up an RBI single to pinch hitter Yoshi Tsutsugo to make the score 2–0. Yomiuri had scoring opportunities in the fifth and seventh innings with two men on with two outs, however they unable to capitalize on either opportunity. DeNA's relief pitchers were able to keep the Giants scoreless for the remainder of the game, allowing the BayStars to tie the series.

=== Game 2 ===
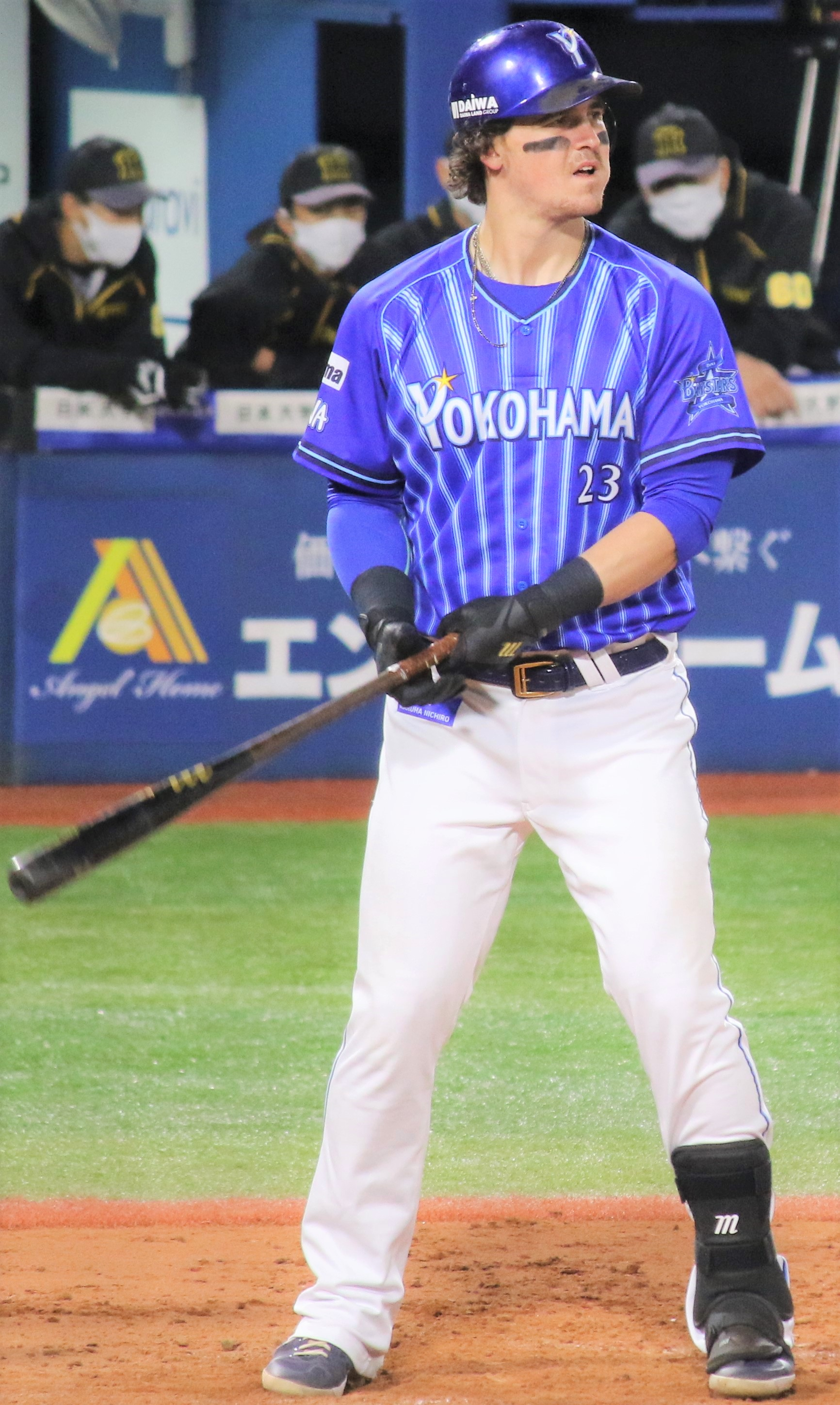
Tyler Austin hit a game-winning home run in Game 2.

Thursday, October 17, 2024, 6:00 pm (JST) at Tokyo Dome in Bunkyō, Tokyo
Team	1	2	3	4	5	6	7	8	9	R	H	E
DeNA	0	0	0	0	1	0	1	0	0	2	7	0
Yomiuri	0	0	0	0	0	1	0	0	0	1	5	0
WP: Shinichi Ohnuki (1–0) LP: Tomoyuki Sugano (0–1) Sv: Kohei Morihara (1); Home runs: DNA: Tyler Austin (1); YOM: None; Attendance: 42,006; Boxscore

Paralympics bronze medalist swimmer Ayano Tsujiuchi threw out the ceremonial first pitch. Shinichi Ohnuki started Game 2 for DeNA and Tomoyuki Sugano started for Yomiuri. The game was scoreless through four innings until a leadoff double by DeNA was driven in by Keito Mori in the fifth inning to give them the lead. The following inning, the Giants tied the game after Louis Okoye doubled and went on to score on a RBI single by Kazuma Okamoto. The BayStars quickly retook the lead when Tyler Austin led off the seventh with a solo home run off of Sugano, which would prove to be game-winning. Ultimately, Sugano allowed two runs on six hits and a walk over seven innings. Ohnuki allowed just one run on five hits and a walk while striking out seven over 6 2/3 innings.

=== Game 3 ===
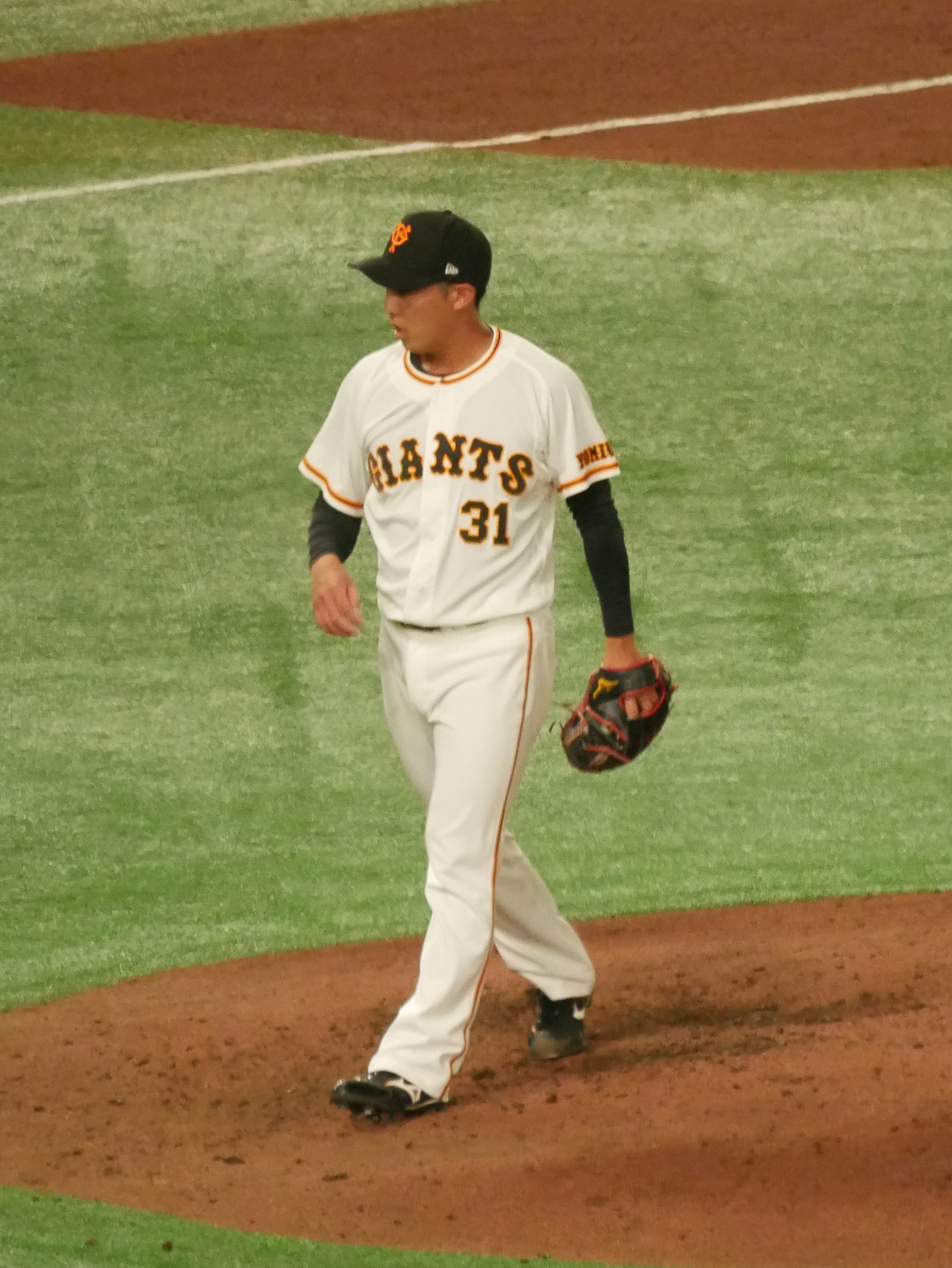
Yuji Akahoshi threw a wild pitch in Game 3 that allowed DeNA to score the game-winning run.

Friday, October 18, 2024, 6:00 pm (JST) at Tokyo Dome in Bunkyō, Tokyo
Team	1	2	3	4	5	6	7	8	9	R	H	E
DeNA	0	0	0	1	1	0	0	0	0	2	4	0
Yomiuri	0	1	0	0	0	0	0	0	0	1	5	1
WP: Chihaya Sasaki (1–0) LP: Yuji Akahoshi (0–1) Sv: Kohei Morihara (2); Home runs: DNA: Tyler Austin (2); YOM: Kazuma Okamoto (1); Attendance: 42,180; Boxscore

Olympic gold medalist judoka Natsumi Tsunoda threw out the ceremonial first pitch. Teruki Yoshino started for DeNA and Foster Griffin started for Yomiuri. Kazuma Okamoto hit a solo home run for the Giants in the second inning, giving Yomiuri their first run and lead of the series. They threatened to add to their lead in the third inning when Takumi Ohshiro came to the plate with the bases loaded and only one out. Ohshiro hit a ground ball that was fielded by a diving Shugo Maki, however, who turned it into an inning-ending double play. DeNA's Austin then hit a solo home run in the fourth inning to tie the game 1–1. The following inning, the BayStars had a runner on third base and two outs. Yuji Akahoshi, the Giants' second pitcher of the game, threw a wild pitch that allowed the runner to score, giving DeNA the lead. Yoshino gave up the one run in a short, three-inning outing, but DeNA's four relief pitchers were able to keep the Giants from scoring further.

=== Game 4 ===
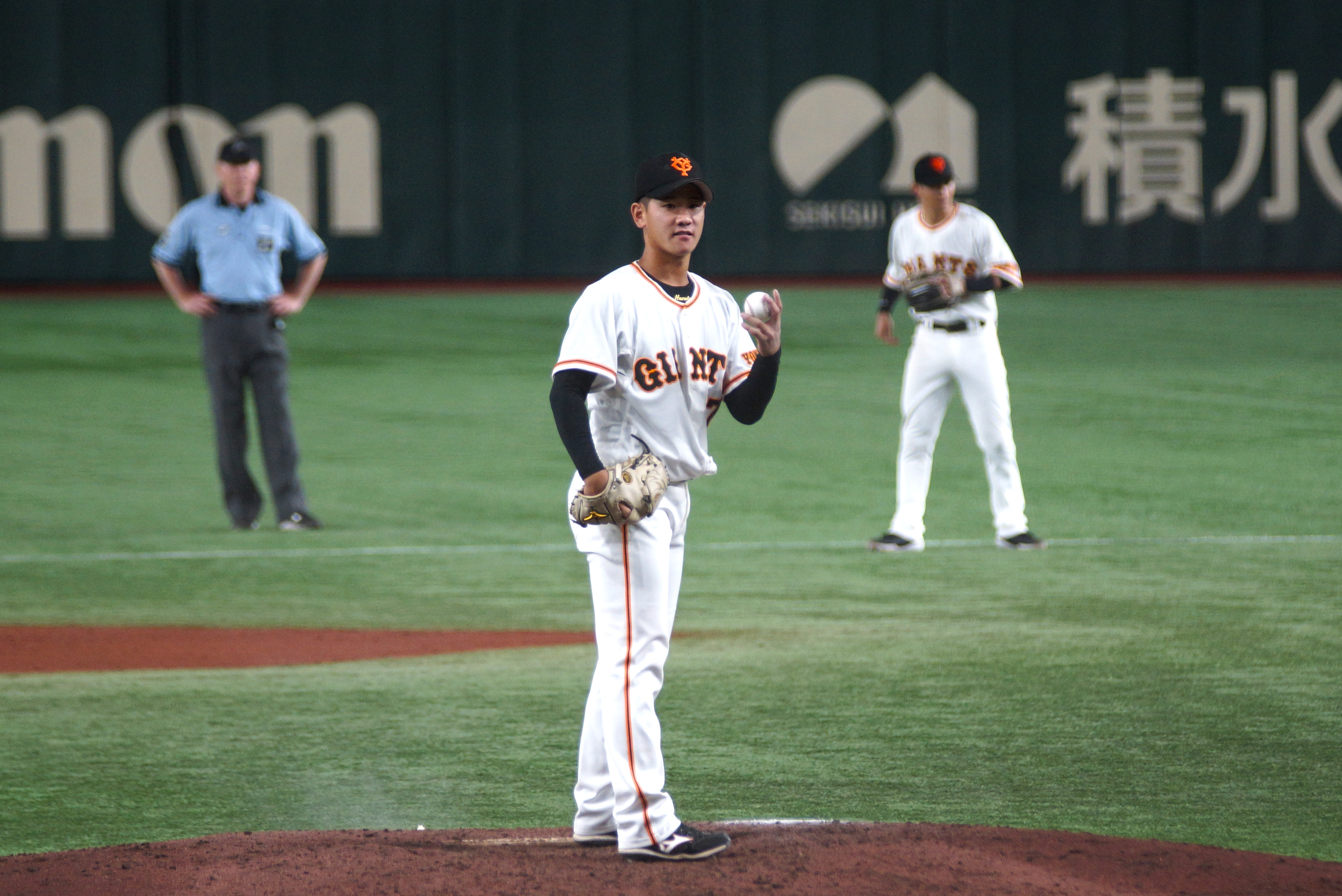
Haruto Inoue pitched six innings, only allowing one hit and one run in Game 4.

Saturday, October 19, 2024, 6:00 pm (JST) at Tokyo Dome in Bunkyō, Tokyo
Team	1	2	3	4	5	6	7	8	9	R	H	E
DeNA	0	0	0	0	0	1	0	0	0	1	3	1
Yomiuri	0	0	0	1	0	0	3	0	X	4	6	0
WP: Kyle Keller (1–0) LP: Andre Jackson (0–1) Sv: Taisei Ota (1); Home runs: DNA: Yasutaka Tobashira (1); YOM: None; Attendance: 42,222; Boxscore

The first potential elimination game for the Giants, Yomiuri started pitcher Haruto Inoue, while DeNA started Andre Jackson in Game 5. After three scoreless innings, the Giants had base runners on first and third bases with no outs in the fourth inning. They took the lead when a ground ball double play off the bat of Kazuma Okamoto scored the runner on third. In the sixth inning, Yasutaka Tobashira recorded his sixth consecutive Climax Series game with a hit with a solo home run. The home run was DeNA's first hit of the game and evened the score. Jackson pitched into the seventh inning and with baserunners on first and third bases, allowed the Giants' Yukinori Kishida to execute a safety squeeze bunt for a hit that scored Hayato Sakamoto from third. After the run, Jackson was relieved by pitcher Hayate Nakagawa. Yomiuri then advanced both base runners one base to second and third via a double steal. Both runners came in to score the next play when Austin made a throwing error after fielding a ground ball, extending their lead to 4–1.

Yomiuri's Inoue struck out six batters over six innings, allowing only the one hit and no walks. Giants' pitchers held the BayStars to only three hits in the game overall. Kyle Keller earned the win by striking out both Austin and Toshiro Miyazaki, two of the BayStars' most dangerous hitters, with a runner on base to end the seventh inning. The game ended with Austin and Miyazaki again striking out with runners on base as Giants closer Taisei Ota handed DeNA their first loss of the Climax Series and helped to keep the Giants from being eliminated.

=== Game 5 ===
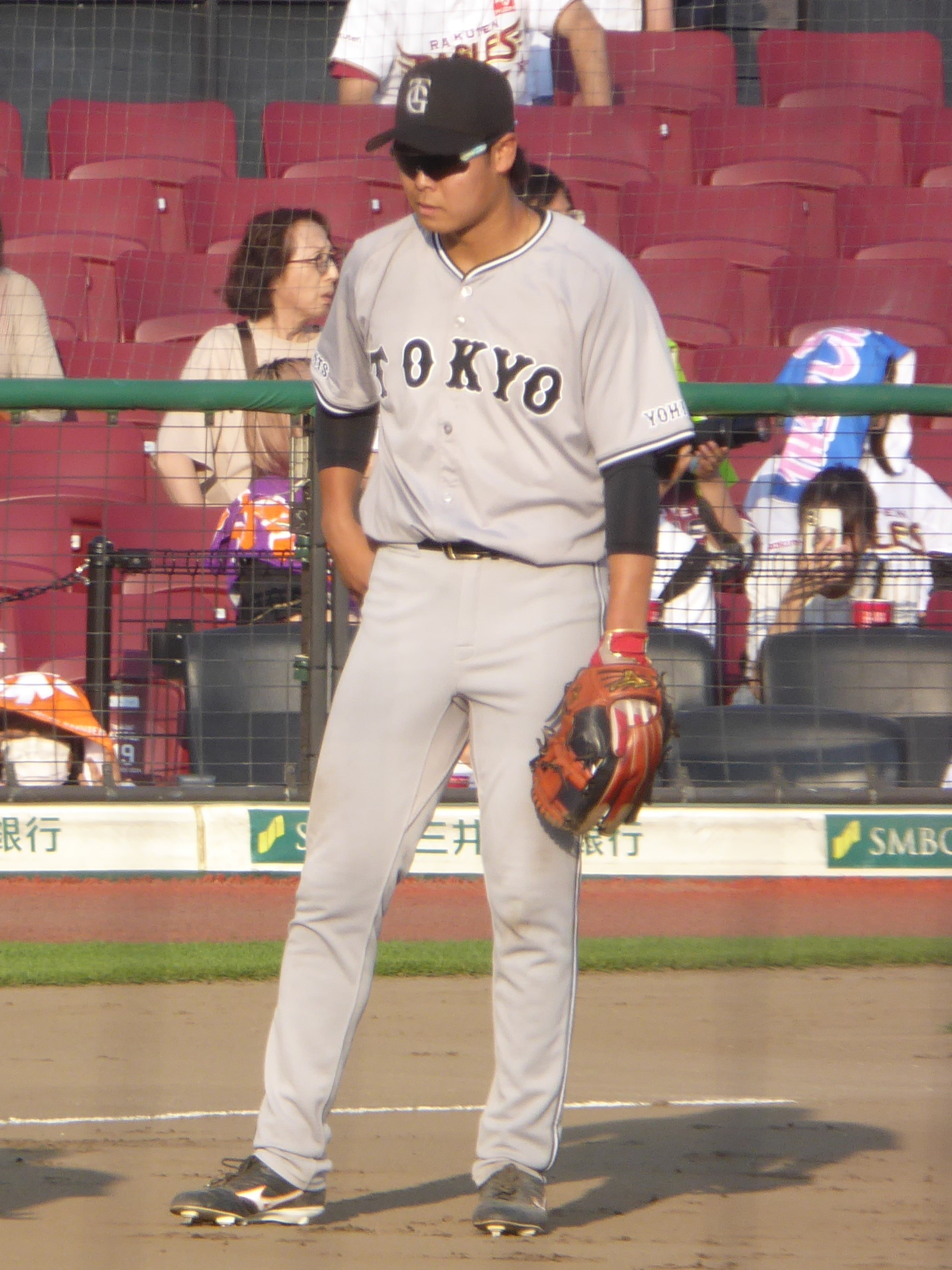
Raito Nakayama's solo home run was the only run of Game 5.

Sunday, October 20, 2024, 6:00 pm (JST) at Tokyo Dome in Bunkyō, Tokyo
Team	1	2	3	4	5	6	7	8	9	R	H	E
DeNA	0	0	0	0	0	0	0	0	0	0	7	0
Yomiuri	0	0	0	0	1	0	0	0	X	1	3	0
WP: Iori Yamasaki (1–0) LP: Yasuaki Yamasaki (0–1) Sv: Taisei Ota (2); Home runs: DNA: None; YOM: Raito Nakayama (1); Attendance: 42,152; Boxscore

Haruhiro Hamaguchi and Iori Yamasaki were the starting pitchers for DeNA and Yomiuri, respectively, in Game 5, the second potential elimination game for the Giants. Yomiuri's Raito Nakayama hit a solo home run off of Yasuaki Yamasaki in relief of Hamaguchi in the fifth inning. The home run was Nakayama first professionally, one of only three hits for Yomiuri in the game, and the only run scored by either team. Iori Yamasaki kept the BayStars scoreless in his 6 1/3-inning start and Yomiuri's three relievers protected the team's one-run lead through the end of the game. Giant's infielders also made important plays late in the game to keep the BayStars scoreless. Shortstop Makoto Kadowaki threw out a runner at home plate in the seventh inning and third baseman Daiki Masuda turned DeNA's sacrifice bunt attempt into a double play an inning later.

=== Game 6 ===
Monday, October 21, 2024, 6:00 pm (JST) at Tokyo Dome in Bunkyō, Tokyo
Team	1	2	3	4	5	6	7	8	9	R	H	E
DeNA	0	0	0	0	2	0	0	0	1	3	10	2
Yomiuri	1	0	0	1	0	0	0	0	0	2	7	0
WP: Hiromu Ise (1–0) LP: Tomoyuki Sugano (0–2) Sv: Kohei Morihara (3); Attendance: 41,856; Boxscore
