= 2025 Central League Climax Series =

Japanese baseball series

First stage
Team (Wins)		Manager	Season
Yokohama DeNA BayStars (2)		Daisuke Miura	71–66–6 (.518), 13 GB
Yomiuri Giants (0)		Shinnosuke Abe	70–69–4 (.504), 15 GB
- Dates: October 11–12

Final stage
Team (Wins)		Manager	Season
Hanshin Tigers (4)		Kyuji Fujikawa	85–54–4 (.612), 13 GA
Yokohama DeNA BayStars (0)		Daisuke Miura	71–66–6 (.518), 13 GB
- Dates: October 15–17
- MVP: Shota Morishita (Hanshin)

The 2025 Central League Climax Series was a set of two consecutive playoff series between the three top-placing teams in Nippon Professional Baseball's Central League (CL) for the 2025 Nippon Professional Baseball season. The first stage began on October 11 and the final stage concluded on October 17. The first stage was a best-of-three series between the second-place Yokohama DeNA BayStars and the third-place Yomiuri Giants. The final stage was a best-of-six series with the Hanshin Tigers, the CL champion, being awarded a one-win advantage against Yokohama DeNA BayStars, the eventual winner of the first stage. The Tigers advanced to the 2025 Japan Series to compete against the Fukuoka SoftBank Hawks, the eventual winner of the 2025 Pacific League Climax Series.

== Background ==
For the fifth year in a row, JERA is sponsoring the naming rights for the Central League Climax Series, and it is officially known as the "2025 JERA Climax Series SE".

In their 90th anniversary season, the Hanshin Tigers clinched their first Central League (CL) championship in two years and seventh overall on September 7, the earliest pennant win in CL history. The previous record was September 8, set by the Yomiuri Giants in 1990. Kyuji Fujikawa, former Tiger's closer and Major League player, led the team to the pennant in his first year as manager. At the time the championship was decided, the Tigers were 17 games ahead of the second-place team, and all of the other CL teams had losing records. Hanshin was the top team in the Central League throughout the season. The team struggled during interleague play in June, losing seven straight games, their biggest losing streak of the season. Strong pitching and good offense powered Hanshin's success throughout the season. They were league best in runs scored and runs allowed at the time of clinching. By season's end, Teruaki Sato finished with 40 home runs and 102 runs batted in (RBIs), both NPB bests for the year and making him a likely PL Most Valuable Player (MVP) candidate. Teammates Shota Morishita had the second-most home runs in the CL with 23 and Koji Chikamoto stole the most bases in the league for the fourth straight year. As for pitching, starter Hiroto Saiki finished the season with a CL-best 1.55 earned run average (ERA) and Shoki Murakami accumulated the most wins and strikeouts. Daichi Ishii also pitched 50 straight scoreless innings in relief, a Nippon Professional Baseball (NPB) record.

While Hanshin won the league handily, the Yokohama DeNA BayStars and the Yomiuri Giants continued battling for second place late into September. DeNA, the previous season's Japan Series winner, eventually prevailed and secured second place on September 28 and home field advantage in the first stage of the Climax Series. It was their best CL finish since placing second in 2022 and their fourth straight Climax Series berth. The BayStars were in third and six games under .500 at the end of August, however they finished September with a 16–5–1 record, propelling them to second place over the Giants. In his fifth year as manager, Daisuke Miura announced his intention to resign after the postseason, citing the team's inability to win the CL pennant as the reason. Yokohama struggled throughout the year, with former Major League player and Cy Young Award-winning starting pitcher Trevor Bauer's poor season and injuries to last year's batting champion Tyler Austin, Shugo Maki, and Toshiro Miyazaki all being contributing factors. Starter Anthony Kay, however, finished the season with the BayStars' lowest ERA in team history, 1.74.

When the Giants were guaranteed third place, they were one game under .500 with two games remaining. They won their final two games to narrowly finish the season with a winning record, 70–69–4. Manager Shinnosuke Abe attributed the team's disappointing finish to not having enough reliable starting pitchers. Foster Griffin left the team midseason to receive treatment for a right knee injury and Shosei Togo and Kai Yokogawa pitched inconsistently all year. Iori Yamasaki was the only Giants pitcher to accumulate ten or more wins in the season. Relief pitcher Raidel Martínez, however, finished tied for the most saves.

== First stage ==
Intra-league teams play 25 games against each other during the regular season. The Yomiuri Giants won the season series against the Yokohama DeNA BayStars 15–9–1, however the BayStars finished two games ahead of the Giants. The two teams had only met in the postseason two times prior to this year, with DeNA winning both series. The match-up was a repeat of the previous season's final stage in which DeNA defeated league champion Yomiuri. A best-of-three series, all games in the first stage were hosted by DeNA, the higher-seeded team, at their home ballpark, Yokohama Stadium.

=== Summary ===
DeNA won the series, 2–0.

Game	Date	Score	Location	Time	Attendance
1	October 11	Yomiuri Giants – 2, Yokohama DeNA BayStars – 6	Yokohama Stadium	2:54	33,783
2	October 12	Yomiuri Giants – 6, Yokohama DeNA BayStars – 7 (11)	Yokohama Stadium	4:31	33,767

=== Game 1 ===
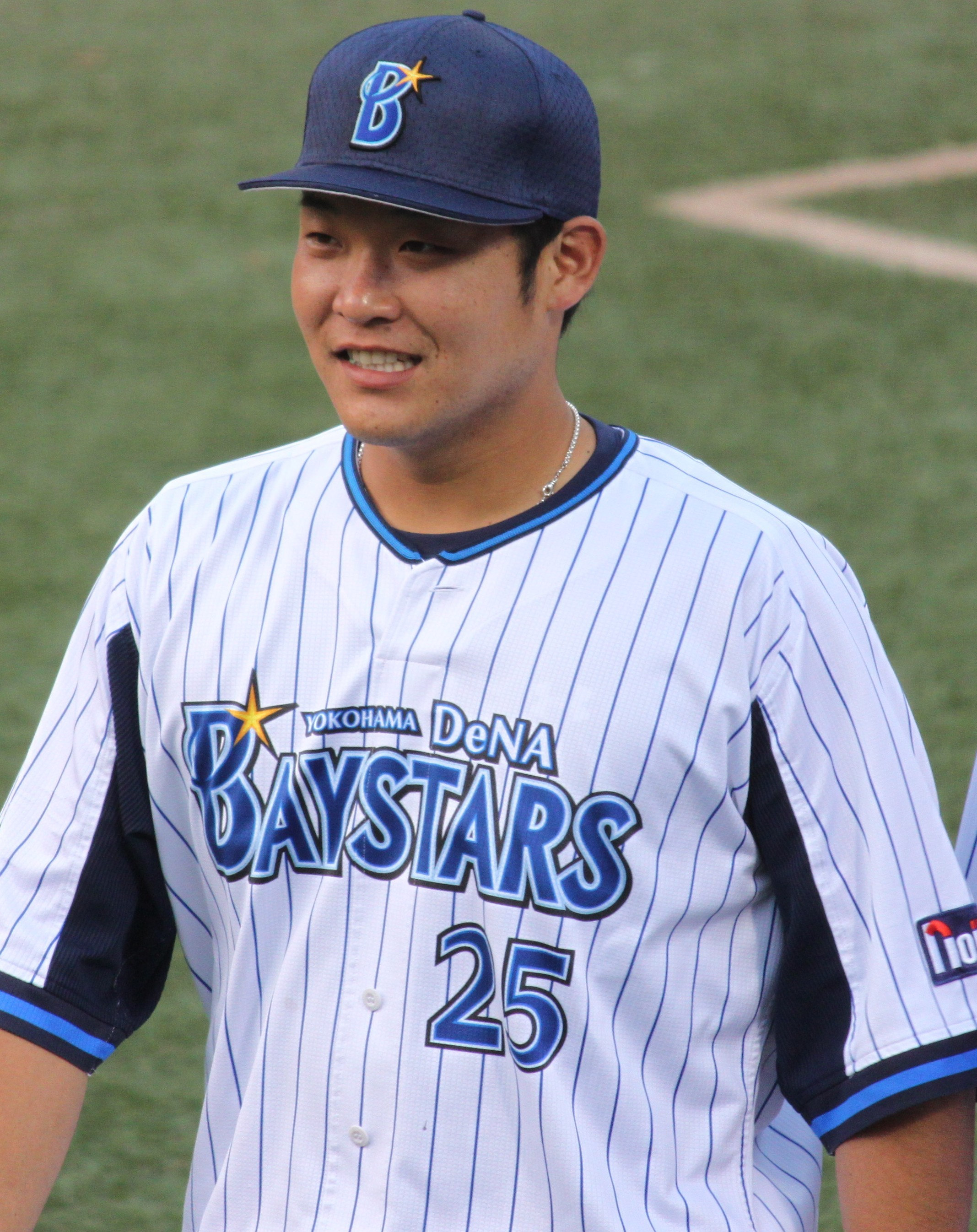
Yoshitomo Tsutsugo hit two home runs in Game 1.

Saturday, October 11, 2025, 2:05 pm (JST) at Yokohama Stadium in Yokohama, Kanagawa Prefecture
Team	1	2	3	4	5	6	7	8	9	R	H	E
Yomiuri	0	0	0	2	0	0	0	0	0	2	2	0
DeNA	0	1	2	0	0	1	0	2	X	6	8	0
WP: Anthony Kay (1–0) LP: Iori Yamasaki (0–1); Home runs: YOM: Gakuto Wakabayashi (1); DNA: Yoshitomo Tsutsugo 2 (2); Attendance: 33,783; Boxscore

Yomiuri Giants fan and quiz contest player Izawa Takushi threw out the ceremonial first pitch. On a rainy afternoon, DeNA started pitcher Anthony Kay, while Yomiuri started Iori Yamasaki. Yoshitomo Tsutsugo gave the BayStars an early lead with a solo home run in the second inning. They extended their lead to 3–0 the following inning via RBI singles by Tatsuo Ebina and Tsutsugo. Yomiuri's Gakuto Wakabayashi responded the following inning by hitting a two-run home run to bring them within one run of the BayStars. It was one of only two hits the Giants had all game. From then on, Kay only allowed one baserunner over the remainder of his seven-inning outting. He struck out eight batters and walked four. Yamasaki lasted six innings and gave up one more solo home run to Tsutsugo in the sixth. Tsutsugo also hit another single in the eighth inning to finish the game 4-for-4. Shugo Maki and Yudai Yamamoto also tallied an RBI each in the eighth to close out the game's scoring.

=== Game 2 ===
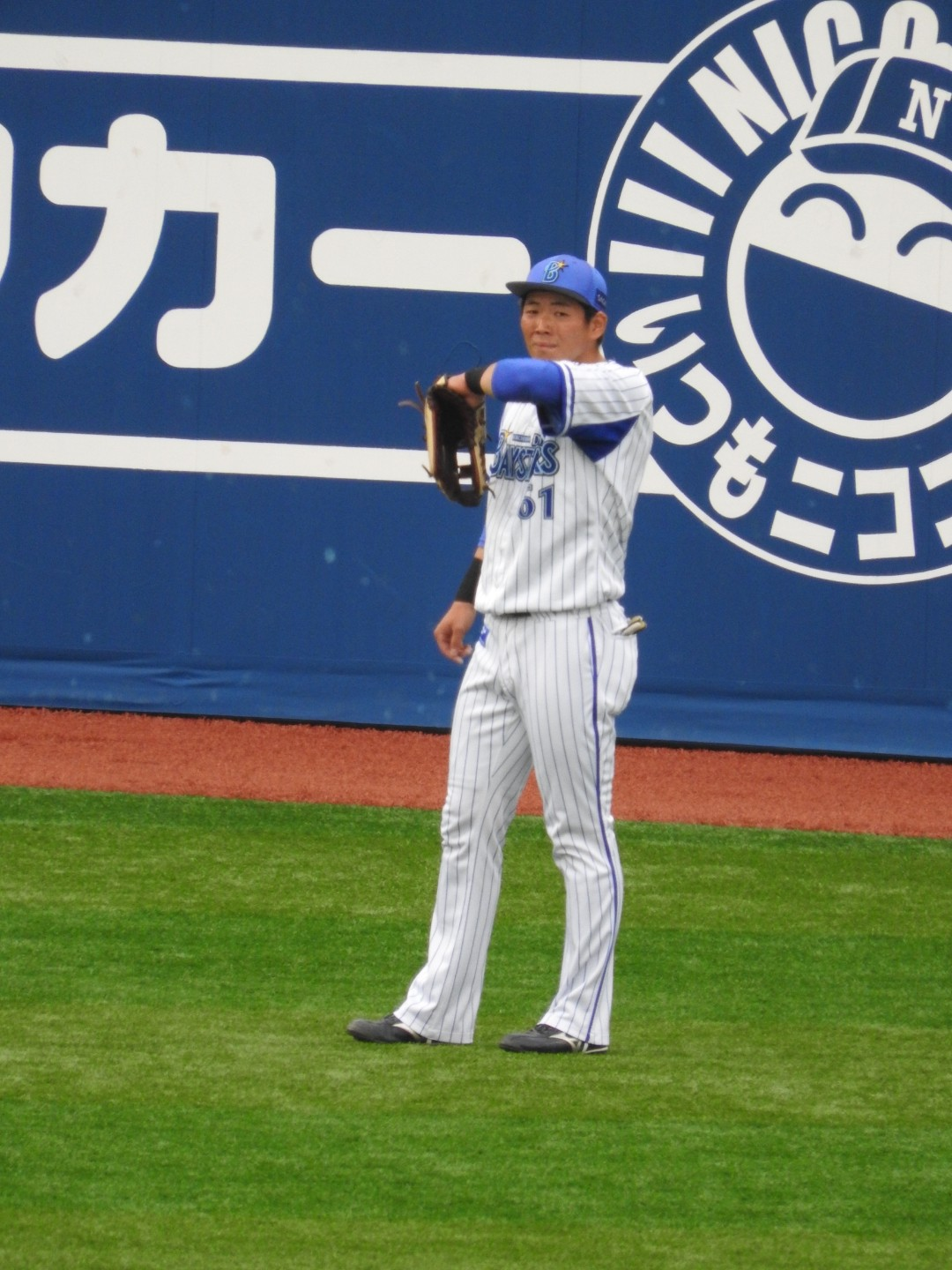
Tatsuo Ebina had a walk-off hit in extra innings in Game 2.

Sunday, October 12, 2025, 2:00 pm (JST) at Yokohama Stadium in Yokohama, Kanagawa Prefecture
Team	1	2	3	4	5	6	7	8	9	10	11	R	H	E
Yomiuri	5	0	0	0	0	0	0	0	0	0	1	6	13	1
DeNA	5	0	0	0	0	0	0	0	0	0	2X	7	11	1
WP: Yuya Sakamoto (1–0) LP: Eito Tanaka (0–1); Home runs: YOM: Shunsuke Sasaki (1), Raito Nakayama (1); DNA: Keita Sano (1), Taiki Ishikami (1); Attendance: 33,767; Boxscore

Andre Jackson started Game 2 for DeNA and Shosei Togo started for Yomiuri. A home run by Giants leadoff hitter Shunsuke Sasaki in the first inning instantly gave Yomiuri the lead. Raito Nakayama followed that up with a 3-run home run later in the inning to increase their lead. BayStars shortstop Taiki Ishikami then made an error that allowed a runner to reach second base and Togo drove him in to cap off a 5-run first. Jackson was removed from the game after the inning. Entering the bottom of the first inning down five runs, DeNA mounted a comeback. Masayuki Kuwahara hit a one-out single and Keita Sano drove him in with a 2-run home run. Next, Tsutsugo walked and Yamamoto singled with two outs. Ishikami then tied the game with a three-run home run.

Tied at five runs a piece after the first inning, both teams failed to score another run through nine innings to push the game into extra innings. The BayStars used six relievers after Jackson's early exit. With the help of a diving stop double play by Maki to end the sixth and a leaping catch by Ebina in the eighth, the bullpen was able to keep the Giants from scoring again until the eleventh inning. Seiji Kobayashi doubled to start the inning for the Giants and advanced on a sacrifice bunt. Next, the bases were loaded by two walks and Sasaki hit an RBI single to break the tie, 6–5. Togo departed the game after the third inning, and seven of Giants relivers also kept the BayStars scoreless until the eleventh inning. Raidel Martínez, the Giants closer, entered the game in the middle of the eighth inning with runners on base to get two outs and end the inning. He went on to retire all three batters he faced in the ninth. Down one run in the eleventh, the first two DeNA batters grounded out. Ishikami then singled, stole second, and was able to score on a single by Takuma Hayashi to even the score. Next, pinch hitter Ryuki Watarai singled to put runners on first and third bases and a walk-off hit by Ebina ended the game 7–6 and secured DeNA's advancement to the final stage.

== Final stage ==
As winners of the Central League, the Hanshin Tigers advanced directly to the final stage of the Climax Series to host the BayStars, the eventual winner of the first stage. The Tigers won the season series against the BayStars 14–8–3 and finished 13 games ahead of them. The two teams had faced each other in the Climax Series four times previously, with each team winning two series. For the final stage, the CL champion Tigers were awarded a one-game advantage over the BayStars. A best-of-six series, all games in the final stage were hosted by Hanshin, the higher seeded team, at their home ballpark, Koshien Stadium.

=== Summary ===
Hanshin won the series, 4–0*.

Game	Date	Score	Location	Time	Attendance
1	October 15	Yokohama DeNA BayStars – 0, Hanshin Tigers – 2	Koshien Stadium	3:36	42,643
2	October 16	Yokohama DeNA BayStars – 3, Hanshin Tigers – 5 (10)	Koshien Stadium	3:41	42,647
3	October 17	Yokohama DeNA BayStars – 0, Hanshin Tigers – 4	Koshien Stadium	3:00	42,649

* The Central League regular season champion is given a one-game advantage in the final stage.

=== Game 1 ===
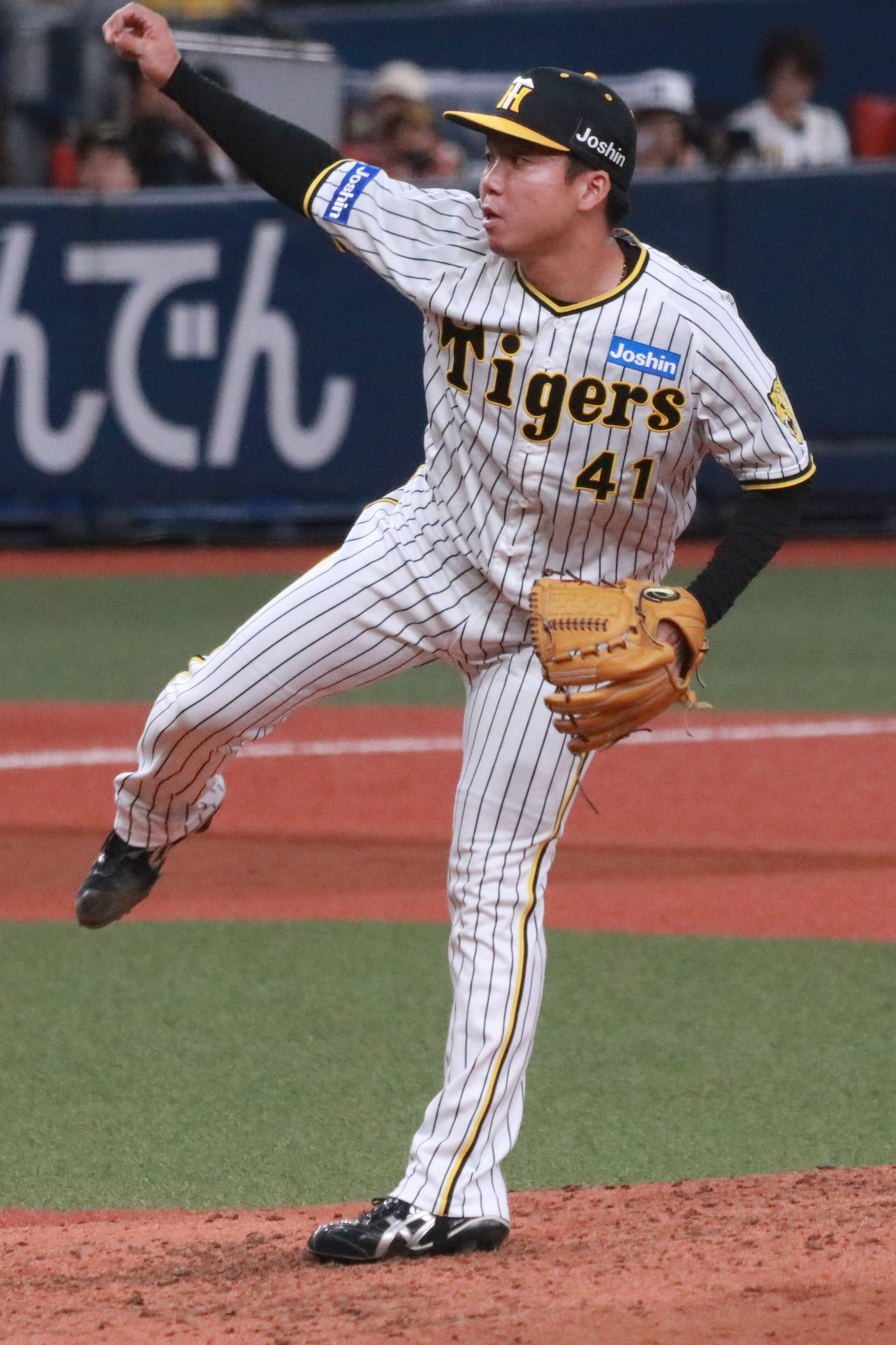
Shoki Murakami pitched five scoreless innings in Game 1.

Wednesday, October 15, 2025, 6:01 pm (JST) at Koshien Stadium in Nishinomiya, Hyōgo Prefecture
Team	1	2	3	4	5	6	7	8	9	R	H	E
DeNA	0	0	0	0	0	0	0	0	0	0	8	1
Hanshin	0	0	0	0	0	2	0	0	X	2	6	1
WP: Masaki Oyokawa (1–0) LP: Katsuki Azuma (0–1) Sv: Suguru Iwazaki (1); Attendance: 42,643; Boxscore

Before the start of Game 1, enka singer Midori Oka performed the Japanese national anthem. Hanshin started pitcher Shoki Murakami, while DeNA started Katsuki Azuma, the two pitchers tied for the most wins in the Central League this season. Murakami loaded the bases in the first inning but a ground out by Yudai Yamamoto ended the scoring threat. Later, Yamamoto again made the last outs against Murakami in both the third and fifth innings, both with two runners on base. Murakami allowed baserunners in each of the five innings he pitched, giving up five hits, two walks, and a hit batsman. DeNA baserunners reached scoring position in four of those five innings, however they were unable to score a run.

Azuma afforded less scoring opportunities to Hanshin in his first five innings pitched, limiting them to only two hits through the first five innings. In the sixth inning, however, Koji Chikamoto hit a single, reached second base on a sacrifice bunt, and stole third. Shota Morishita then singled to center field to drive in game's first run. Later in the inning, with two outs and runners on first and third bases, Dan Onodera hit an RBI-single to give the Tigers a 2–0 lead and prompt Azuma's replacement. Tigers relief pitching was able to keep the BayStars scoreless for the remainder of the game. Masaki Oyokawa earned the win after pitching 1 2/3 innings, with Daichi Ishii and Suguru Iwazaki following up to close out the game. Oka returned to the field after the game to lead the crowd in singing "Rokko Oroshi", Tigers' team song.

=== Game 2 ===
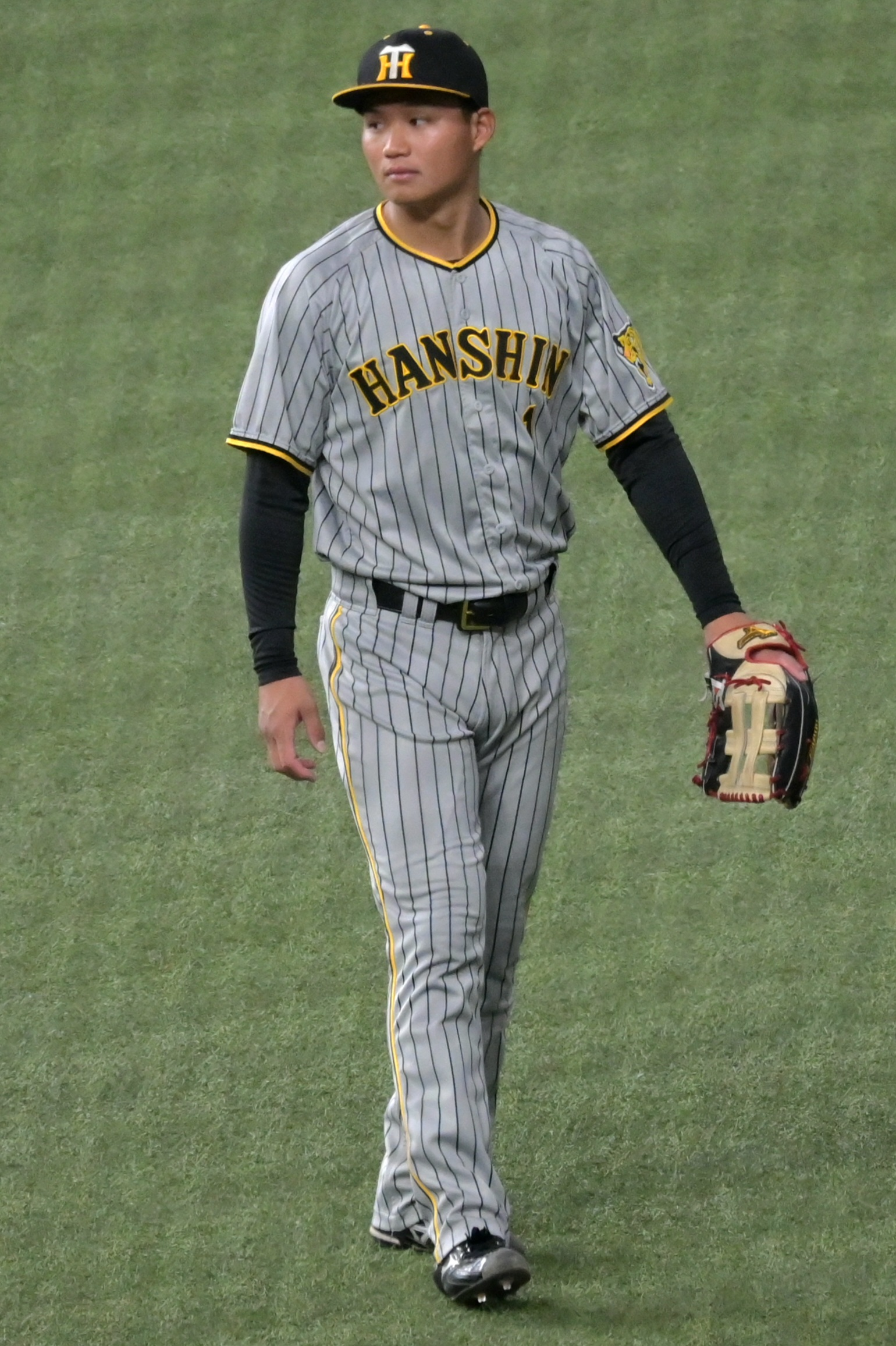
Shota Morishita hit a two-run walk-off homerun in Game 2.

Thursday, October 16, 2025, 6:00 pm (JST) at Koshien Stadium in Nishinomiya, Hyōgo Prefecture
Team	1	2	3	4	5	6	7	8	9	10	R	H	E
DeNA	0	0	2	1	0	0	0	0	0	0	3	8	0
Hanshin	2	0	0	0	0	0	0	1	0	2X	5	9	0
WP: Masaki Oyokawa (2–0) LP: Chihaya Sasaki (0–1); Home runs: DNA: Shugo Maki (1); HAN: Shota Morishita (1); Attendance: 42,647; Boxscore

Comedian Soichi Nakaoka threw out the ceremonial first pitch. Game 2 featured starting pitchers Hiroto Saiki for Hanshin and Yu Takeda for DeNA. Hanshin jumped out to a two-run lead in the first inning with an RBI hit by Teruaki Sato and a sacrifice fly by Yusuke Oyama. DeNA responded in the third inning when Tatsuo Ebina hit an RBI-double and single by Keita Sano drove him in to tie the game at two runs apiece. The next inning, leadoff batter Shugo Maki hit a solo home run to give the BayStars a 3–2 lead. Heavy rain in the middle of the fifth inning prompted the infield tarp to be brought out, causing a 47 minute rain delay. Saiki lasted five innings, allowing three runs on six hits. After the rain delay, Takeda came back out to pitch in the sixth inning but was removed after facing one batter. He had allowed two runs on six hits.

With runners on second and third bases and no outs in the eighth inning, DeNA attempted to add to their lead. Hanshin's Sato, however, caught a would-be sacrifice fly ball hit to right-center field and immediately threw it to home plate and prevented the runner from scoring. He then went on to tie the game in the bottom of the inning with an RBI-single to right field with one out and runners on first and second bases. Still tied after the ninth inning, the game entered extra innings. After the BayStars failed to score in the tenth, the Tigers' Morishita went up to bat with no outs and a runner on first base and hit a two-run, walk-off home run.

=== Game 3 ===
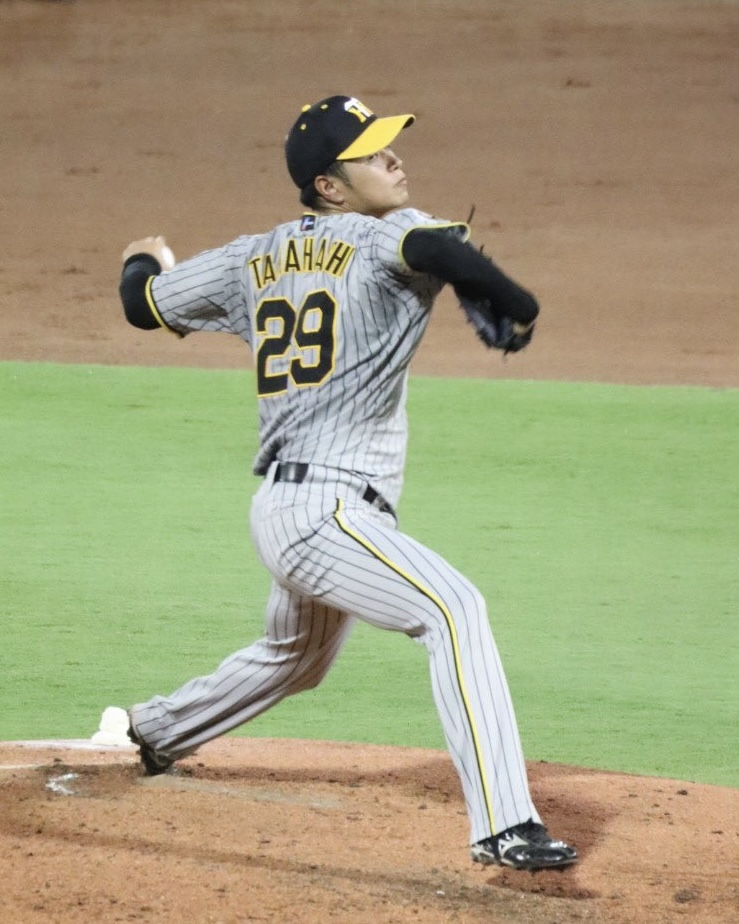
Haruto Takahashi had a no-hitter broken up in the eighth inning in Game 3.

Friday, October 17, 2025, 6:01 pm (JST) at Koshien Stadium in Nishinomiya, Hyōgo Prefecture
Team	1	2	3	4	5	6	7	8	9	R	H	E
DeNA	0	0	0	0	0	0	0	0	0	0	3	0
Hanshin	3	0	1	0	0	0	0	0	X	4	7	1
WP: Haruto Takahashi (1–0) LP: Anthony Kay (0–1); Home runs: DNA: None; HAN: Teruaki Sato (1); Attendance: 42,649; Boxscore

The ceremonial first pitch was thrown out by singer-songwriter Taiiku Okazaki. Game 3 featured starting pitchers Haruto Takahashi for Hanshin and Anthony Kay for DeNA. The Tigers took an early lead in the first inning. With one out and runners on first and second bases, Sato hit a first-pitch solo home run off of Kay to put them ahead 3–0. Oyama extended Hanshin's lead by one run with an RBI-double in the third inning. DeNA's Kay walked four batters and give up five runs through his five innings of play.

Takahashi, however, kept the BayStars hitless through seven innings and had only one batter reach base via a throwing error by Sato in the first inning. He later struck out five consecutive batters from the start of the third inning into the fourth and only needed to throw 26 pitches to get through the fifth to the seventh innings. After getting one out in the eighth inning, he gave up his first hit to pinch hitter Shion Matsuo, losing the possibly of throwing the first no-hitter in a final stage of the Climax Series. After Matsuo, he allowed two more hits to load the bases and was relieved by Ishii who got the final out of the inning. Iwazaki kept the BayStars scoreless in the ninth to win the game and the series.

== Aftermath ==
The Tigers' win qualified them to play in the Japan Series for the eighth time and their first time in two years. After Game 3, Shota Morishita was named the final stage's most valuable player (MVP) and received a two million yen prize. In the three games, he had six hits in nine at bats, two of which drove in game-winning runs. Outgoing DeNA manager Daisuke Miura was also presented with a bouquet of flowers by Hanshin manager Kyuji Fujikawa amid cheers from the Koshien crowd.
