= Seiya Matsubara =

Japanese baseball player (born 1995)

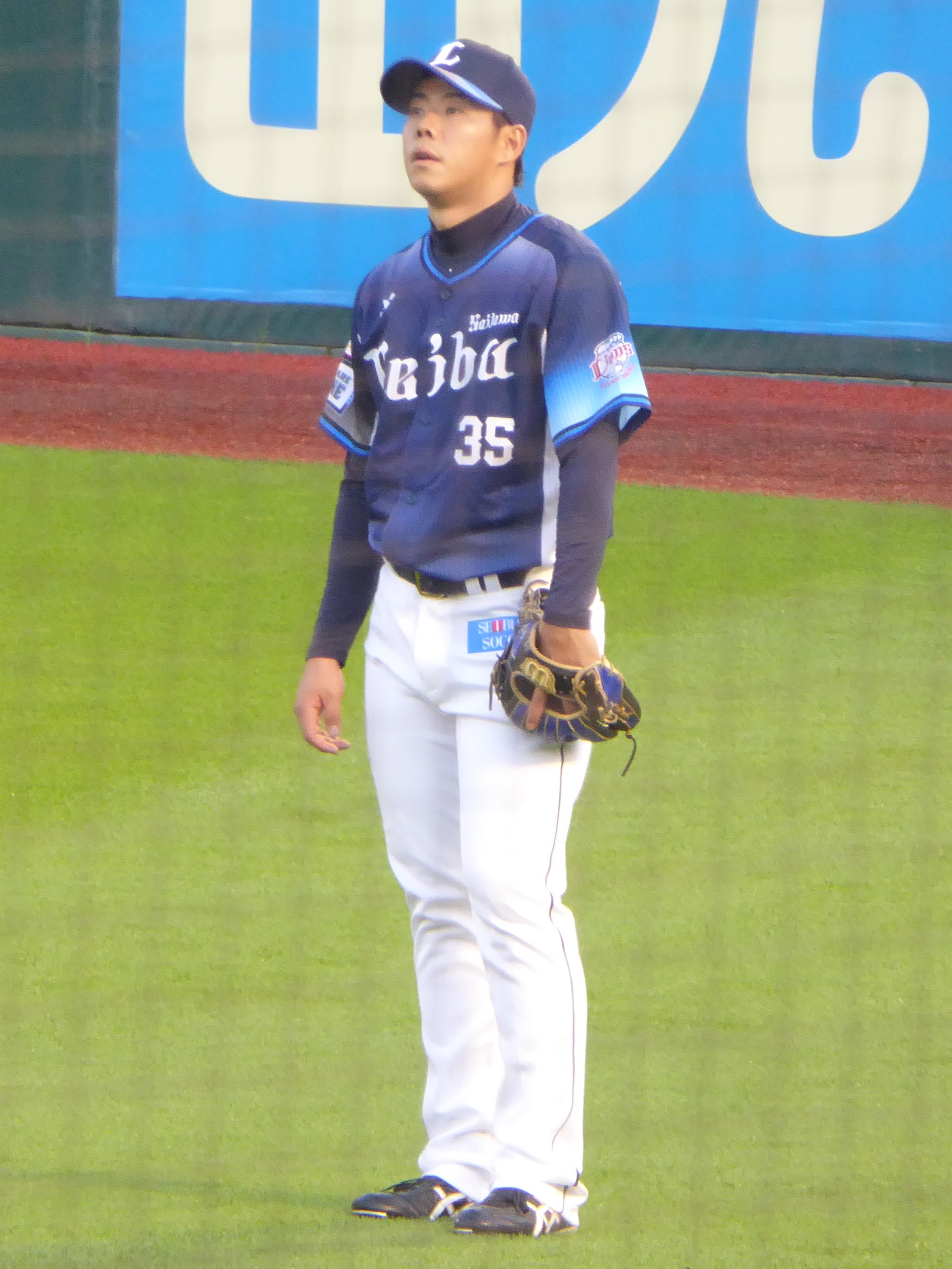
- Outfielder
- Born: January 26, 1995 (age 31); Osaka, Osaka, Japan
- Batted: Left Threw: Right

NPB debut
- July 25, 2020, for the Yomiuri Giants

Last NPB appearance
- April 23, 2025, for the Saitama Seibu Lions

NPB statistics
- Batting average: .241
- Hits: 215
- Home runs: 15
- Runs batted in: 67
- Stolen base: 30

Teams
- Yomiuri Giants (2017–2024); Saitama Seibu Lions (2024–2025)

Seiya Matsubara (松原 聖弥, Matsubara Seiya; born January 26, 1995) is a professional Japanese baseball player. He plays outfielder for the Saitama Seibu Lions.

== Career ==
=== Saitama Seibu Lions ===
On June 24, 2024, Matsubara was traded to the Saitama Seibu Lions in exchange for Gakuto Wakabayashi.
