= Gakuto Wakabayashi =

Japanese baseball player (born 1998)

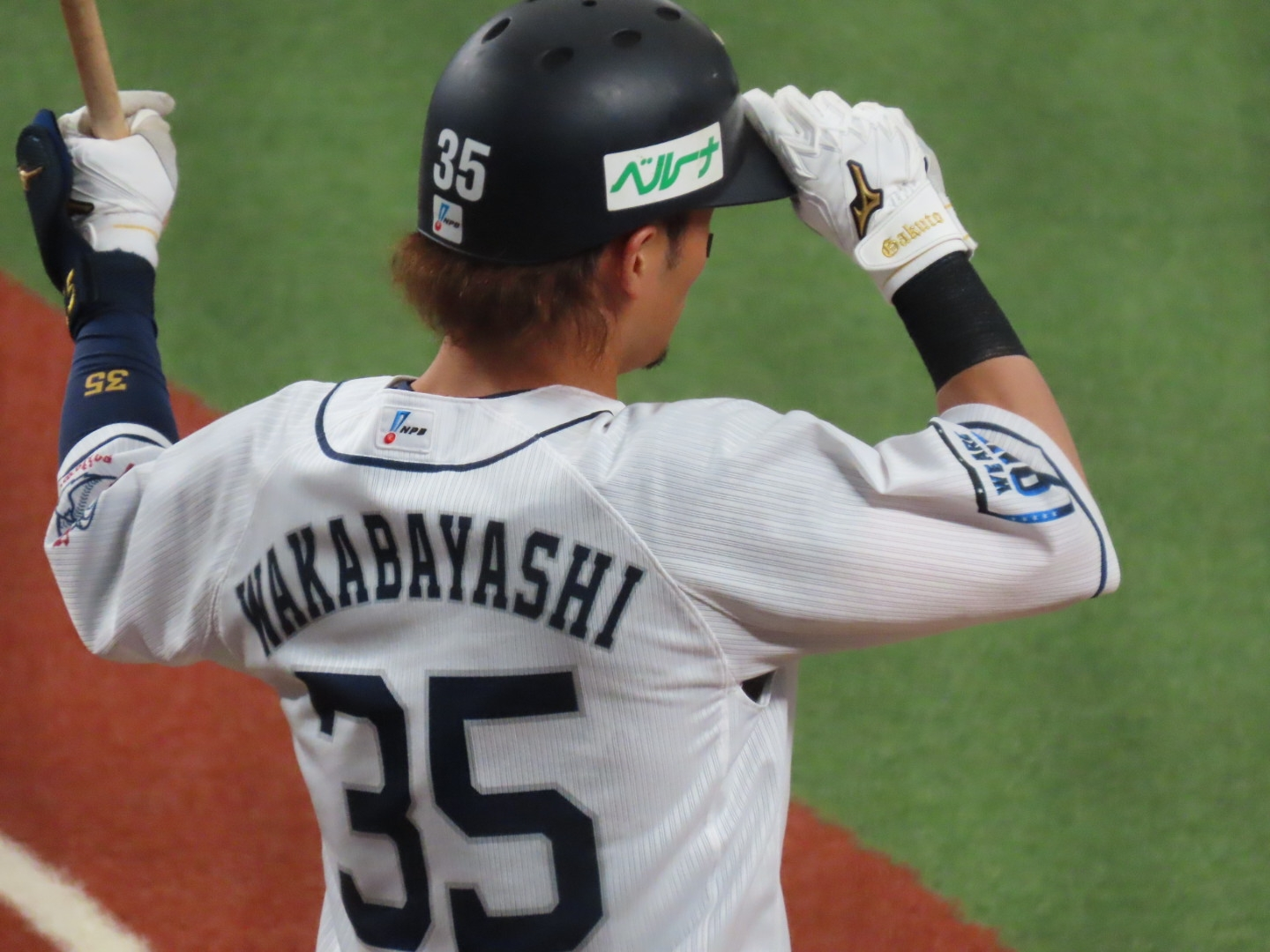
- Wakabayashi with the Saitama Seibu Lions

Saitama Seibu Lions – No. 49
- Outfielder
- Born: April 13, 1998 (age 28); Shiraoi, Hokkaido, Japan
- Bats: Right Throws: Right

NPB debut
- March 26, 2021, for the Saitama Seibu Lions

NPB statistics (through June 28, 2024)
- Batting average: .229
- Home runs: 6
- Runs batted in: 25
- Stolen base: 29
- Stats at Baseball Reference

Teams
- Saitama Seibu Lions (2021–2024); Yomiuri Giants (2024–2026); Saitama Seibu Lions (2026-present)

Gakuto Wakabayashi (若林 楽人, Wakabayashi Gakuto; born April 13, 1998) is a Japanese professional baseball outfielder for the Saitama Seibu Lions of Nippon Professional Baseball (NPB). He has previously played in NPB for the Yomiuri Giants.

== Career ==
=== Saitama Seibu Lions ===
Wakabayashi made his NPB debut for the Saitama Seibu Lions on March 26, 2021.

Wakabayashi played in 19 games for the Lions in 2024, batting .129/.156/.274 with three home runs, five RBI, and two stolen bases.

=== Yomiuri Giants ===
On June 24, 2024, Wakabayashi was traded to the Yomiuri Giants in exchange for Seiya Matsubara.
