= Hiromu Ise =

Japanese baseball player (born 1998)

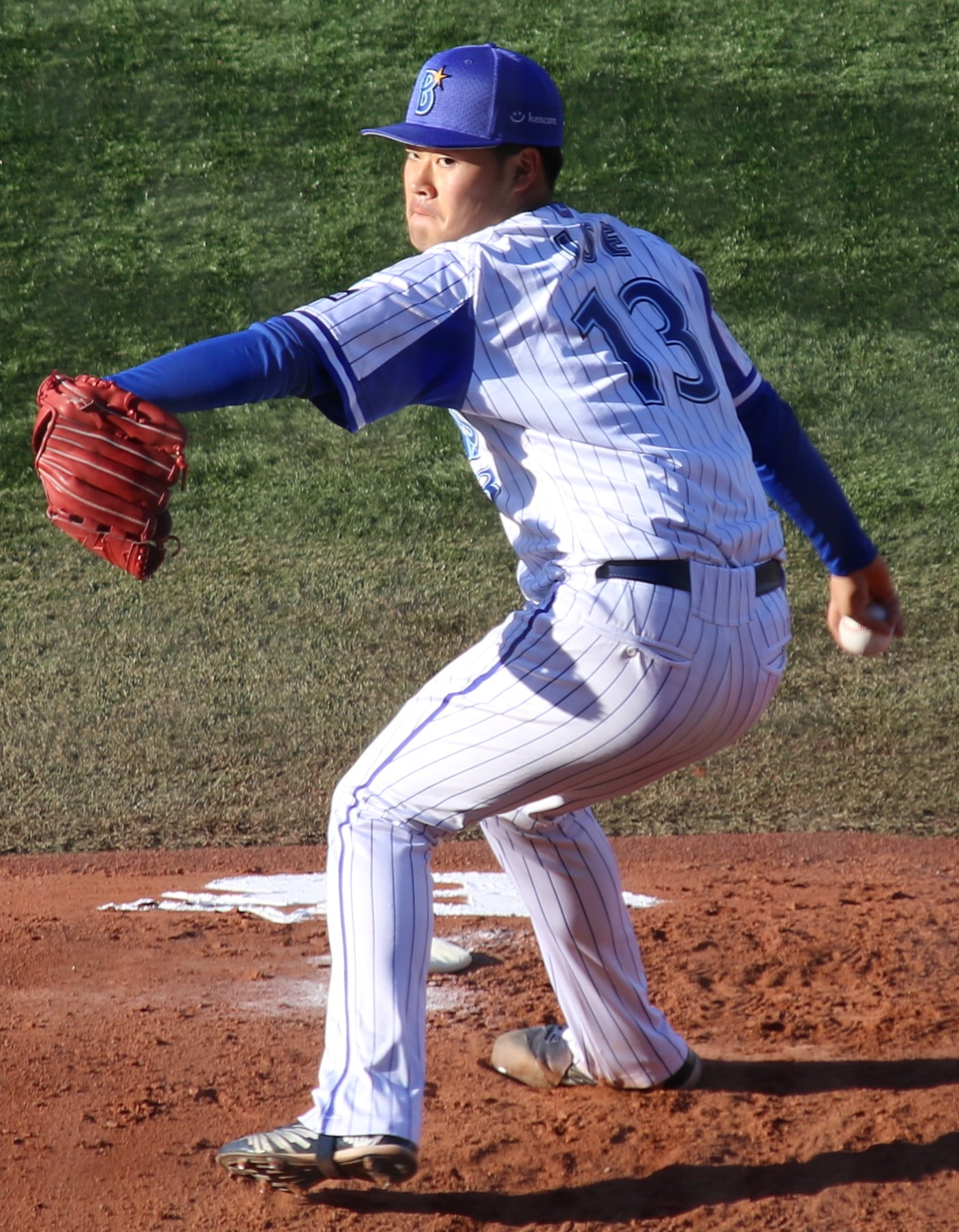

Yokohama DeNA BayStars – No. 13
- Pitcher
- Born: March 7, 1998 (age 28); Kumamoto, Kumamoto, Japan
- Bats: Right Throws: Right

NPB debut
- June 20, 2020, for the Yokohama DeNA BayStars

NPB statistics (through 2025 season)
- Win–loss record: 12–19
- Earned run average: 2.59
- Strikeouts: 275
- Saves: 16
- Holds: 132
- Stats at Baseball Reference

Teams
- Yokohama DeNA BayStars (2020–present)

Career highlights and awards
- Japan Series champion (2024); 2× NPB All-Star (2022, 2025)

Hiromu Ise (伊勢 大夢, Ise Hiromu; born March 7, 1998) is a Japanese professional baseball pitcher for the Yokohama DeNA BayStars of Nippon Professional Baseball (NPB).
