= Yasutaka Tobashira =

Japanese baseball player (born 1990)

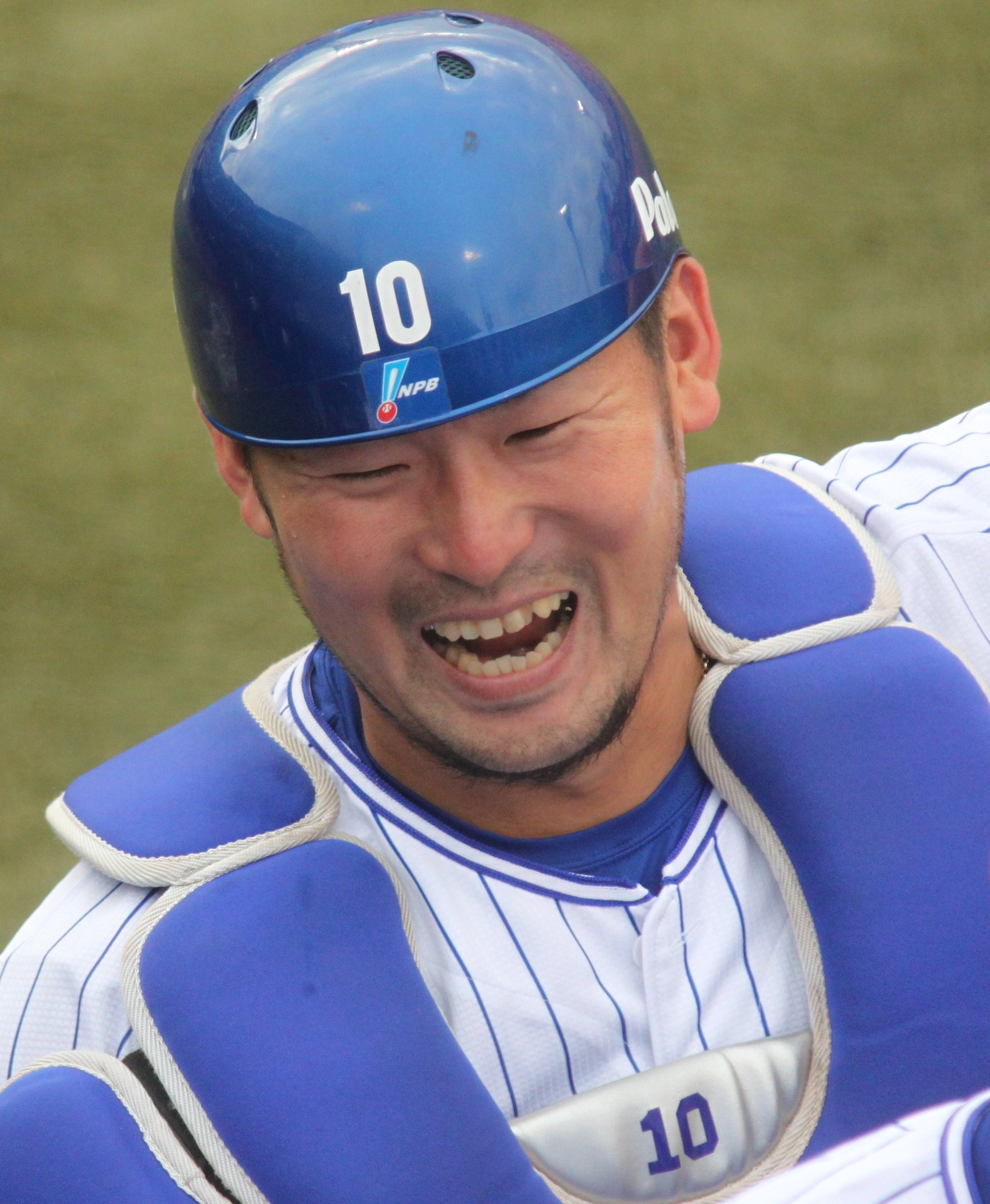
- Tobashira with the Yokohama DeNA BayStars

Yokohama DeNA BayStars – No. 10
- Catcher
- Born: April 11, 1990 (age 36); Kimotsuki, Kagoshima, Japan
- Bats: Left Throws: Right

NPB debut
- May 25, 2016, for the Yokohama DeNA BayStars

Career statistics (through April 1, 2022)
- Batting average: .216
- Home runs: 21
- Runs batted in: 127
- Stats at Baseball Reference

Teams
- Yokohama DeNA BayStars (2016–present)

Career highlights and awards
- Japan Series champion (2024)

Yasutaka Tobashira (戸柱 恭孝, Tobashira Yasutaka; born April 11, 1990 in Kimotsuki, Kagoshima, Japan) is a professional Japanese baseball player. He plays catcher for the Yokohama DeNA BayStars.
