= Fumihito Haraguchi =

Japanese baseball player (born 1992)

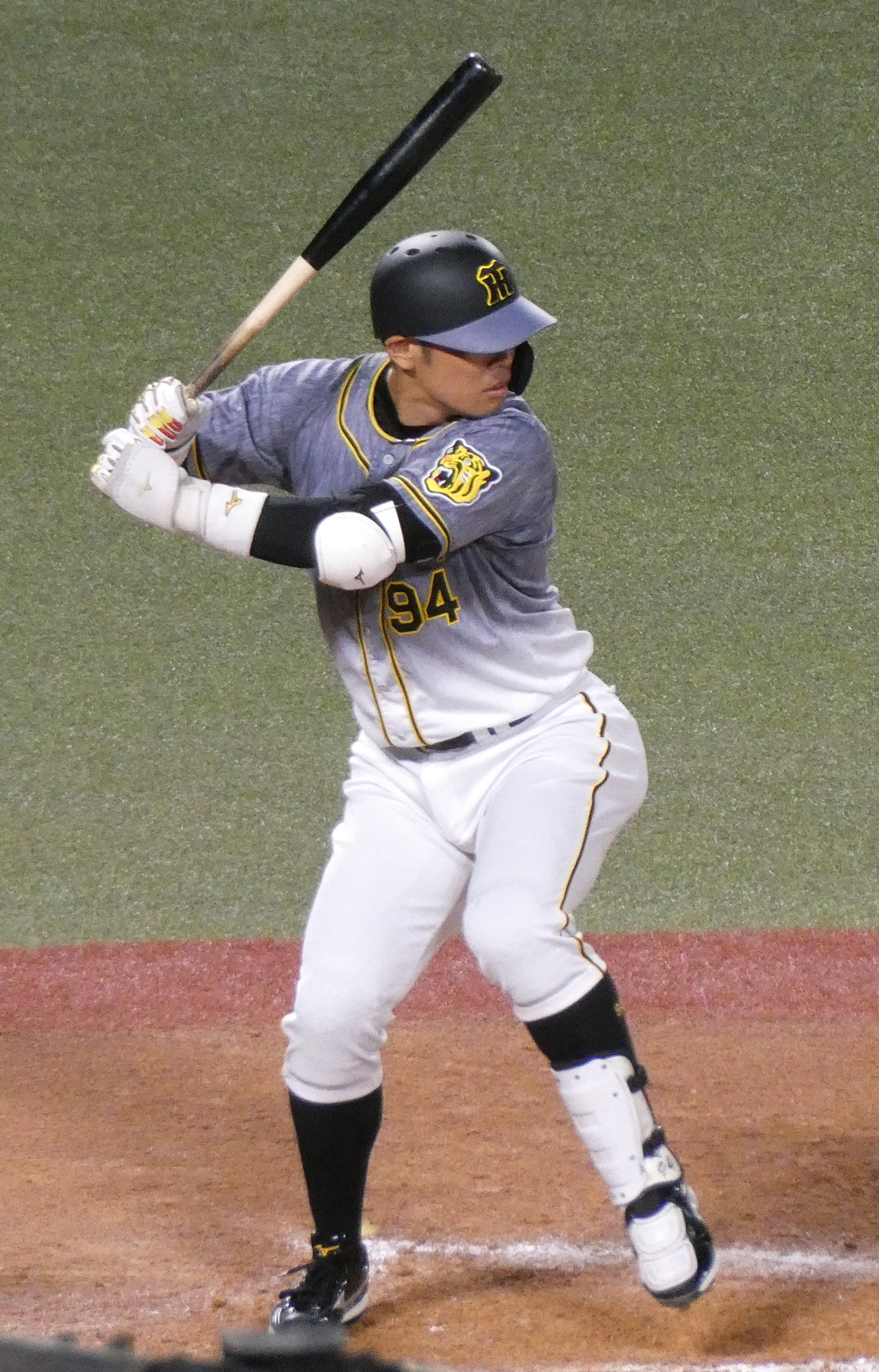
- Haraguchi with the Hanshin Tigers
- Catcher
- Born: March 3, 1992 (age 34); Saitama, Japan
- Batted: Right Threw: Right

NPB debut
- April 27, 2016, for the Hanshin Tigers

Last NPB appearance
- October 2, 2025, for the Hanshin Tigers

NPB statistics
- Batting average: .269
- Hits: 274
- Home runs: 29
- Runs batted in: 152
- Stats at Baseball Reference

Teams
- Hanshin Tigers (2016–2025)

Career highlights and awards
- 2× NPB All-Star (2016, 2019); Japan Series Champion (2023)

Fumihito Haraguchi (原口 文仁, Haraguchi Fumihito; born March 3, 1992) is a Japanese former professional baseball catcher. He played in Nippon Professional Baseball (NPB) from 2010 to 2025 for the Hanshin Tigers.

== Early baseball career ==
A native of Saitama Prefecture, Fumihito began playing baseball in fourth grade, and went on to play for the Yorii Little Seniors (currently the Fukaya Saihoku Little Seniors) in junior high. But it wasn't until his second year in Teikyo High School that he switched permanently to the catcher role.

When his school represented Eastern Tokyo in the 2009 Summer Koshien Tournament, he batted clean-up and averaged 0.385 in 3 games, helping his team reach the semi-finals. Despite not winning the championship, his performance at the plate and experience as a catcher earned him a spot in the national team for the US-Japan High School Baseball Tournament. According to an interview, he was so passionate about baseball that even after his classes, various club activities, and a 4-hour commute to his school in Tokyo and back to Saitama, he would spend hours into the night practicing with his father's home-made batting cage in their backyard.

== Professional career ==
Haraguchi was the Hanshin Tigers' 6th round pick in the autumn 2009 professional draft. He signed an initial 30-million contract for an annual salary of 4.8 million yen, and was assigned the jersey number 52.

Farm Leagues (2010-2015)

He batted 0.143 in nine Western League (farm) games during his first year. The following year, his performance improved, and though still at the farm, he was given more chances at the plate. He finished the season with a BA of 0.329, 26 hits, 11 RBIs and 2 home runs.

Due to recurring hip injuries throughout the 2012 season, he only managed to appear in 16 games, and finished with a 0.189 BA and 5 RBIs. Because he was unable to make it to the main roster for three years, he was released from his contract at the end of the season, and was instead offered to sign a 1-year Ikusei (development) contract, and his jersey number changed to 124.

2013 was another injury-plagued year for Haraguchi, as a pitch fractured his left hand during a batting practice. He only managed to play in 17 farm games for the entire season, but luckily, the Tigers decided to renew his Ikusei contract for another year.

2014 and 2015 proved to be better seasons as he appeared in more and more games. However, his performance at the plate, while enough to keep his contract getting renewed, still failed to earn him a spot in the main roster.

2016

With a new manager coming in, the 2016 season proved to be the break-out year for Haraguchi. He was assigned to train with the main squad during spring camp, and played all the way until the pre-season exhibition games. On April 27, the team decided to promote him to the main roster, assigned him the jersey number 94, and straight away called him to his first match. He debuted as a pinch-hitter on the bottom of the 5th in the Giants match at Koshien, remained as catcher, and scored his first hit as a pro on the 8th inning against Kazuto Taguchi. The following day, he scored the 2-base hit that tied the game in the bottom of the ninth, preventing the Giants to win as the game ended in a draw until the 12th. Because of his sudden assignment to the main squad and jersey number change, he borrowed the uniform of 2nd-squad coach Katsuhiko Yamada (no.82) for two games until he was given his proper jersey with number 94.

He alternated as a catcher and first baseman in the following week, while his continued success at the plate eventually led him to bat clean-up in some games. He even notched a walk-off hit in the May 19 game against the Dragons. At the end of May, he was awarded the Central League MVP of the month for recording a batting average of 0.380, and hitting 17 RBIs including 5 home runs. He became the first Ikusei contract player in Japanese baseball history to get this award, and the 1st Hanshin catcher in 41 years to do so.

Due to his consistent delivery on the plate, he became the first NPB player from an Ikusei contract to get nominated in the mid-season All Star Game. But as he began to experience pain in his right shoulder, his appearances were gradually reduced during the later half of the season. Out of 107 games, he finished with a batting average of 0.299, 46 RBIs including 11 home runs. His notable performance earned him a 17.2 million yen pay raise, bringing his annual salary to 22 million yen, the biggest player salary percentage increase (358%) in team history.。

2017

On March 1, he announced his marriage with a nursery school teacher from his home town in Saitama. This is also his first time to start the year in the main squad. While he trained both as a catcher and 1st baseman, he was groomed more towards being the replacement of the regular 1st baseman Mauro Gomez whose contract was not renewed for 2017. While still registered as a catcher, he joined the starting line up as 1st baseman at the start of the season. On the April 6 game against the Swallows, he hit his first home run of the season during overtime to win the game. This was his first career walk-off home run as a pro. But due to his inconsistent batting, he got alternated on the post with fellow catcher-turned-first-baseman Masahiro Nakatani. With his deteriorating performance and Nakatani's continuous improvement, his starts gradually became fewer mid-season (mostly as a pinch-hitter or substitute catcher), and he finally got sent back to the farm on August 26. As he battled with pain in his left torso, he never made it back to the main squad, and finished the season with 25 RBIs and an average of 0.226 in 73 games. His salary decreased to 20 million yen by the end of the season.

2018

At the start of the season, he and Umeno alternated as the starting catcher, but he gradually progressed as the team's go-to pinch hitter as he demonstrated a knack for clutch hitting. 57 out of his 82-game appearances were as a pinch hitter where he batted a remarkable 0.404. His performance was even better with runners in scoring position, where he averaged 0.455 throughout the season. By mid-September, he was two hits away from beating the team record of most hits by a pinch hitter in a season (23 hits, recorded by Shinjiro Hiyama in 2008), but he was taken off the roster when he injured his left hand on September 14. He made a full recovery in time for the October 5 match against the Dragons, and tied the pinch hit record in the 8th inning to the delight of the home crowd in Koshien. With this, he became the team's only right-handed batter with the most pinch hits, and the 3rd player in NPB history with the most pinch hits in one season (tied with Hiyama). He received a 10 million pay raise at the end of the season.

2019

He spent the first four months in rehab after undergoing surgery for colorectal cancer in January. His first outing was in the May 8 farm game against the Dragons, and he then continued to bat clean up until June. It wasn't until the inter-league games that he was finally called to the main squad. On June 4, he was assigned to pinch hit at the top of the 9th against the Marines and launched a 2 base hit off Josh Revin's 144 km/h slider. Five days after with the Fighters game tied at 3-3, he was again called to pinch hit and notched his first walk off hit of the season, which earned him not only the "Welcome back!" cheers of the home crowd in Koshien but also the Central League's best walk off hit of the month award. Due to his great performance as designated hitter during inter-league, he once more earned the popular vote for the July All-Star Games despite having been back in the field for only a month. He rose to the occasion when he hit home runs in both games. He then alternated as a pinch-hitter and catcher in most of his next outings, but it wasn't until August 8 that he finally notched his first and only official home run of the season. He finished with 11 RBIs and a 0.276 average in 43 games, and also pinch hit in most of the post-season Climax Series games. He also earned the Central League Comeback Player of 2019 award in November. He received a 2 million pay cut however, for appearing in fewer games, which brought his salary down to 28 million yen.

2020

While he once more got alternated to catch with Umeno and Sakamoto when the season started, majority of his appearances this season were as a pinch hitter (30 out of 48 games). He did not fare well in his first 15 outings, and was eventually removed from the roster on August 17 when he only managed 1 hit in 10 pinch hitter at-bats. Nevertheless, this didn't prevent him from hitting 0.361 in the farm games which got him promoted back to the main squad in mid-September. When Umeno started experiencing pain in his right torso, Haraguchi was once more assigned the catcher role. He had a handful of outings until Umeno recovered in October, then he returned to being a pinch hitter. He consistently hit above 0.300 since his return from the farm, and he remained in the main squad and continued to hit well until the season ended. Offense-wise, he finished with 20 hits, 19 RBI, and a .278 average (.300 as a pinch hitter). His defense as a catcher left much to be desired however, as he recorded only a 10% success rate in catching base stealing attempts.

On September 29, 2025, Haraguchi announced that he would be retiring following the conclusion of the season.

== Personal life ==
At the end of the 2018 season, he was diagnosed with colorectal cancer during a year-end health check. He underwent surgery a few weeks later, and on January 31, he announced on social media that his surgery was successful and posted another tweet six days later saying he had left the hospital.
