= Yuji Akahoshi =

Japanese baseball player (born 1999)

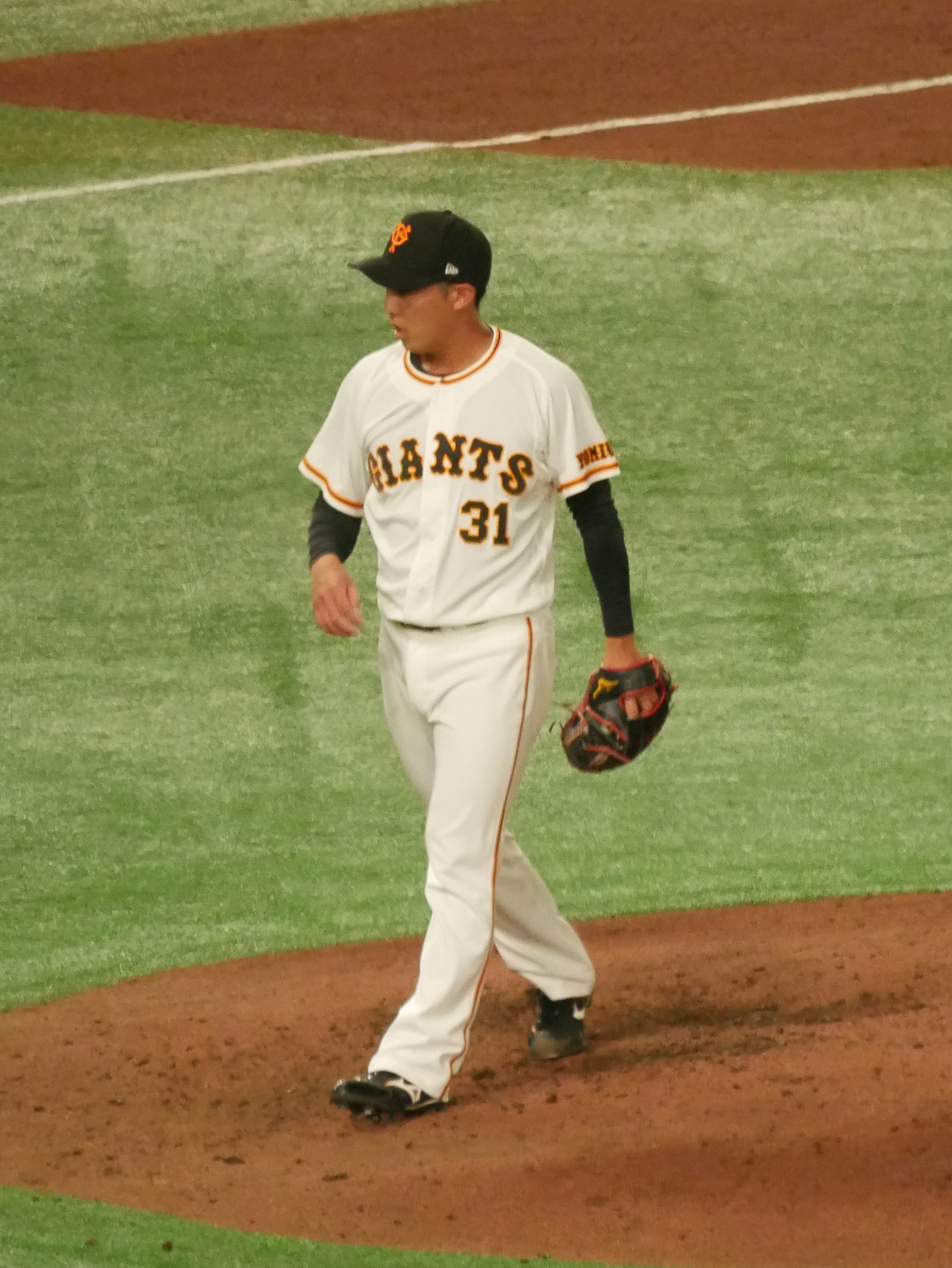

Yomiuri Giants – No. 31
- Pitcher
- Born: July 2, 1999 (age 27); Setagaya, Tokyo, Japan
- Bats: Right Throws: Right

NPB debut
- March 27, 2022, for the Yomiuri Giants

Career statistics (through August 1, 2026)
- Win–loss record: 22–28
- Earned run average: 3.16
- Strikeouts: 275
- Stats at Baseball Reference

Teams
- Yomiuri Giants (2022–present)

Yuji Akahoshi (赤星 優志, Akahoshi Yuji; born July 2, 1999, in Setagaya, Tokyo, Japan) is a professional Japanese baseball player. He is a pitcher for the Yomiuri Giants of Nippon Professional Baseball (NPB).
