= Shosei Togo =

Japanese baseball player (born 2000)

Shōsei Togō
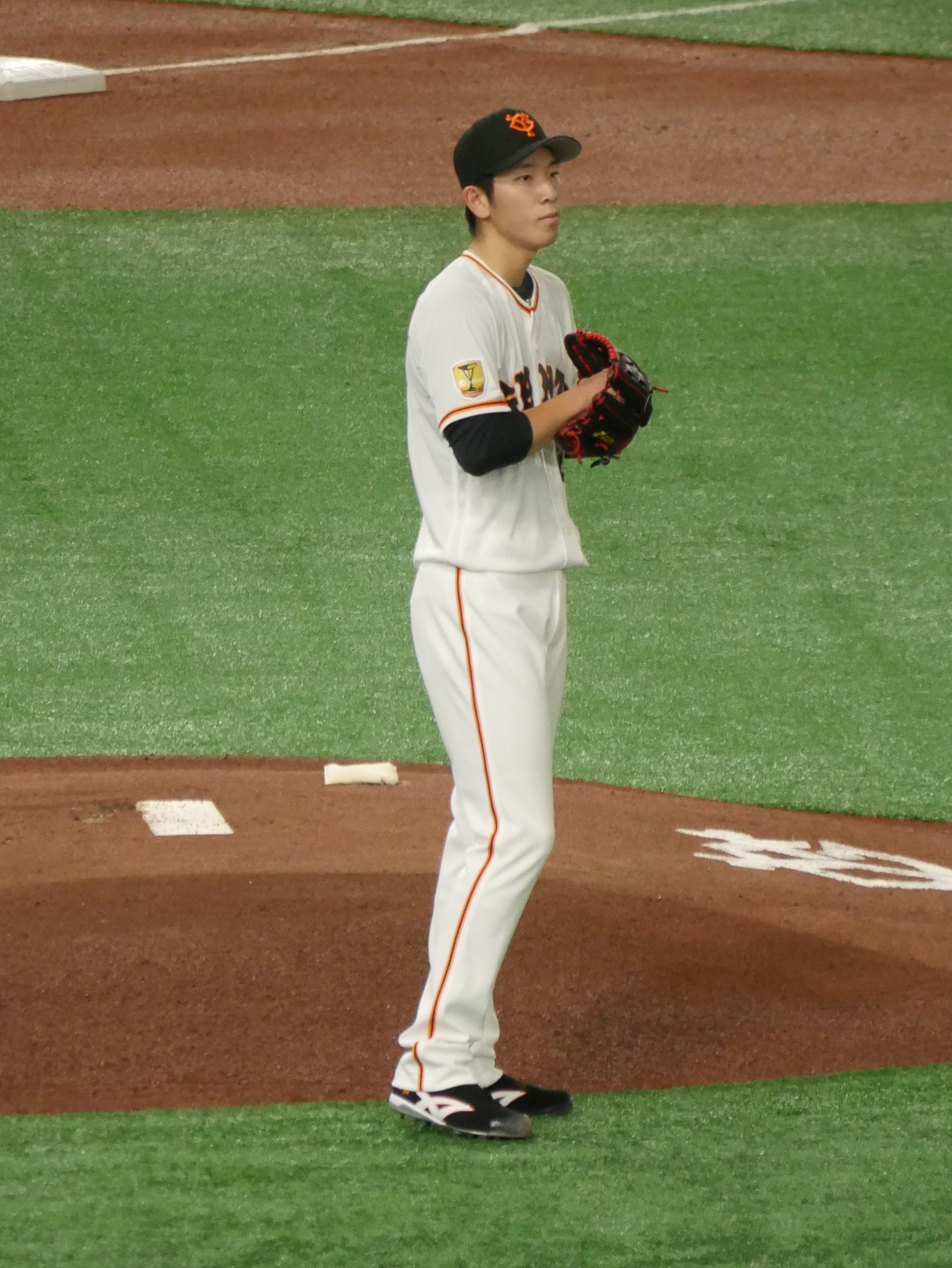

Yomiuri Giants – No. 20
- Pitcher
- Born: April 4, 2000 (age 25); Miyakonojō, Miyazaki, Japan
- Bats: Right Throws: Right

NPB debut
- September 21, 2019, for the Yomiuri Giants

NPB statistics (through 2024)
- Win–loss record: 55–35
- Earned run average: 2.75
- Strikeouts: 706
- Stats at Baseball Reference

Teams
- Yomiuri Giants (2019–present)

Career highlights and awards
- 4× NPB All-Star (2021–2024); Pitched a no-hitter on May 24, 2024
Medals
Men's baseball
Representing Japan
World Baseball Classic
Gold medal – first place	2023 Miami	Team
WBSC Premier12
Silver medal – second place	2024	Team

Shōsei Togō (戸郷 翔征, Togō Shōsei; born April 4, 2000) is a Japanese professional baseball pitcher for the Yomiuri Giants of Nippon Professional Baseball (NPB).

== Career ==
On May 24, 2024, Togō threw a no-hitter against the Hanshin Tigers.
