= Raito Nakayama =

Japanese baseball player (born 2002)

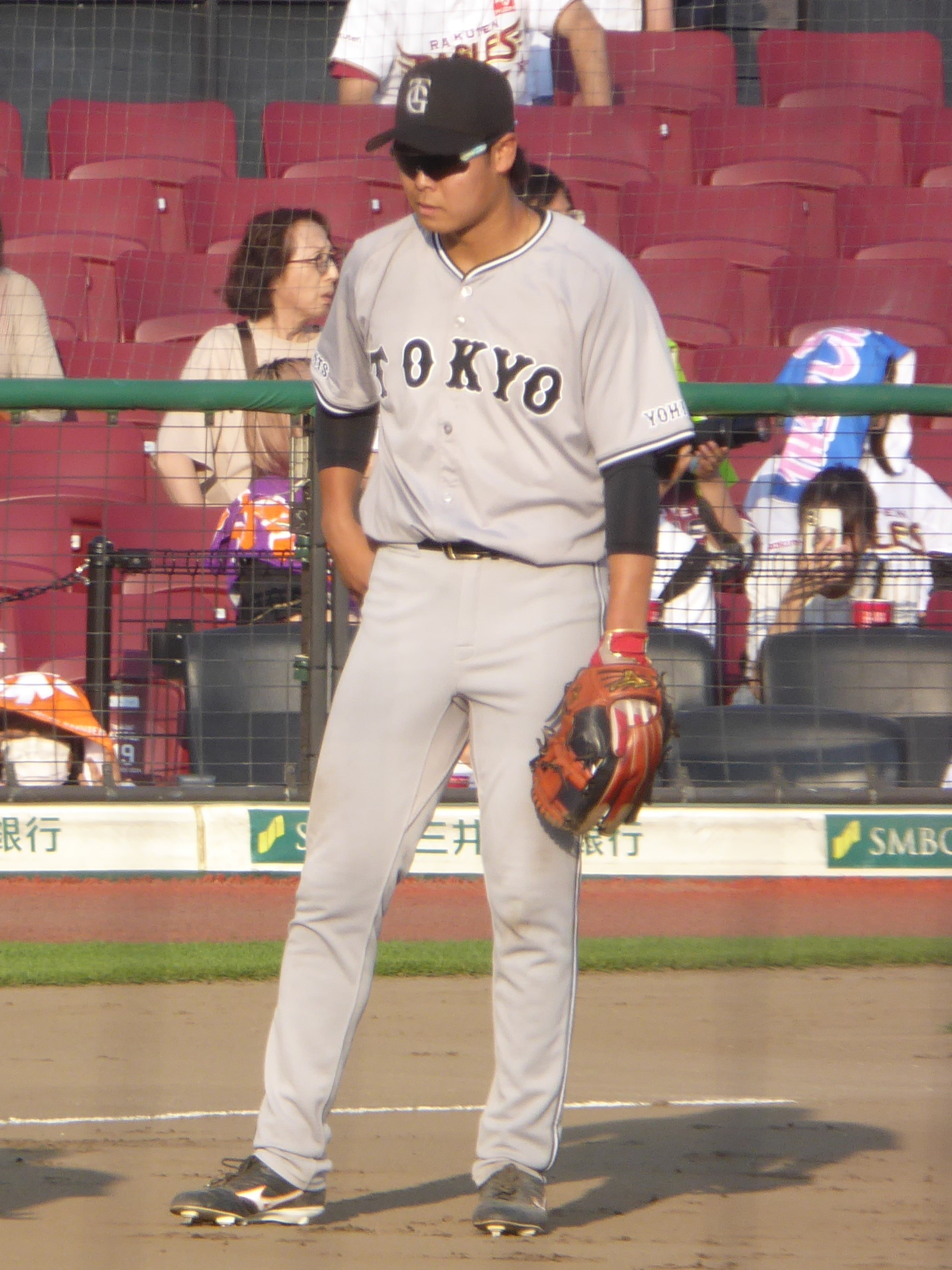
- Nakayama with the Yomiuri Giants

Yomiuri Giants – No. 40
- Infielder, Outfielder
- Born: April 12, 2002 (age 23); Nagoya, Aichi, Japan
- Bats: Left Throws: Right

NPB debut
- May 3, 2022, for the Yomiuri Giants

NPB statistics (through 2025 season)
- Batting average: .248
- Home runs: 7
- RBI: 37
- Hits: 149
- Stolen base: 9
- Sacrifice bunt: 9
- Stats at Baseball Reference

Teams
- Yomiuri Giants (2021–present)

Raito Nakayama (中山 礼都, Nakayama Raito; born April 12, 2002) is a professional Japanese baseball player. He plays infielder and outfielder for the Yomiuri Giants.
