= Keita Sano =

Japanese baseball player (born 1994)

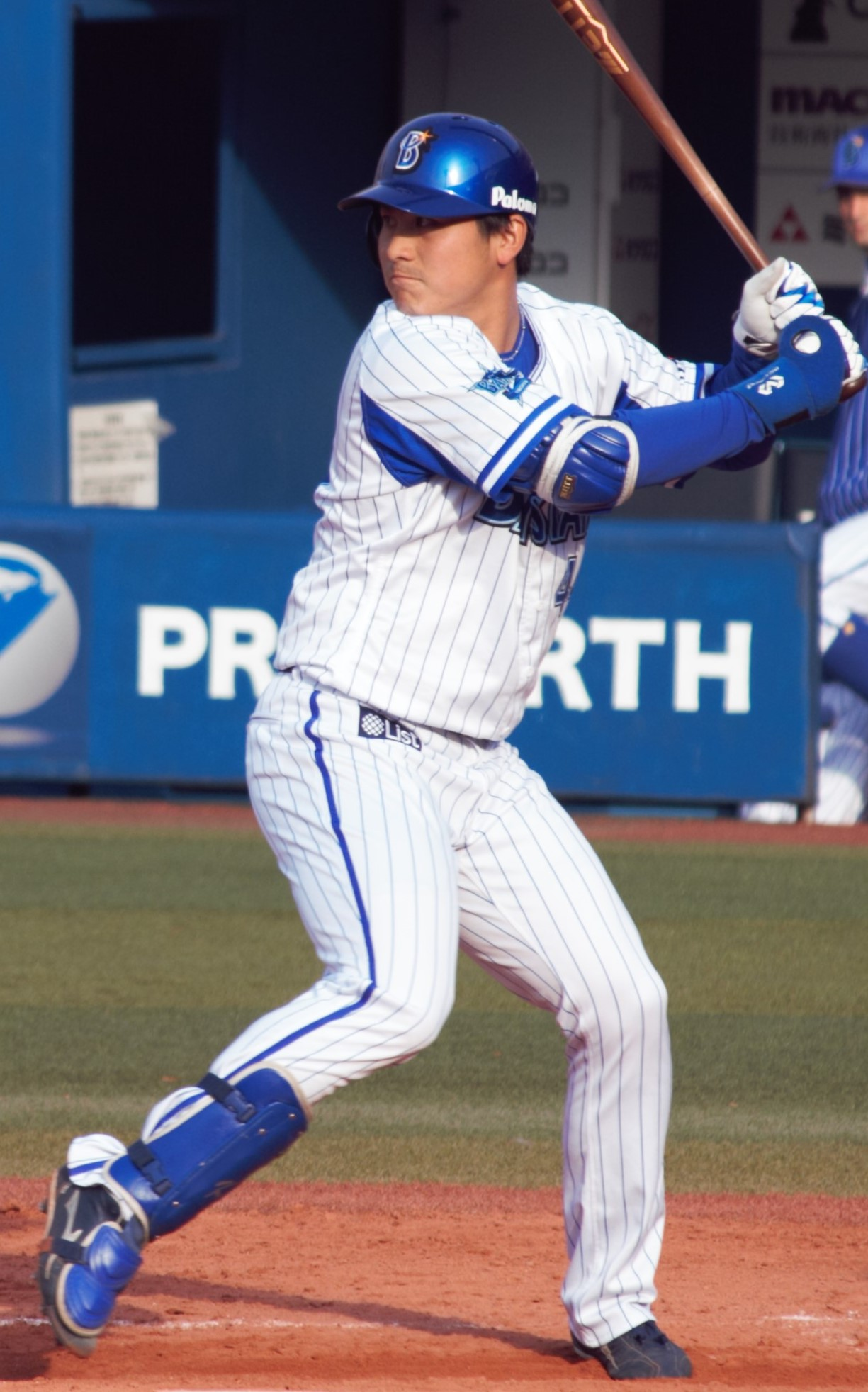
- Sano with the Yokohama DeNA BayStars

Yokohama DeNA BayStars – No. 7
- Infielder, Outfielder
- Born: November 28, 1994 (age 31); Okayama, Okayama, Japan
- Bats: Left Throws: Right

NPB debut
- March 31, 2017, for the Yokohama DeNA BayStars

NPB statistics (through 2024 season)
- Batting average: .289
- Hits: 839
- Home runs: 90
- RBI: 388
- Stats at Baseball Reference

Teams
- Yokohama DeNA BayStars (2017–present)

Career highlights and awards
- Japan Series champion (2024); Central League Batting Champion (2020); 3× NPB All-Star (2021–2023); 2× Best Nine Award (2020, 2022)
Medals
Men's baseball
Representing Japan
WBSC Premier12
Silver medal – second place	2024	Team

Keita Sano (佐野 恵太, Sano Keita; born November 28, 1994), nicknamed "Thanos" is a Japanese professional baseball infielder for the Yokohama DeNA BayStars of Nippon Professional Baseball (NPB).
