= Hiroto Saiki =

Japanese baseball player (born 1998)

Saiki Hiroto
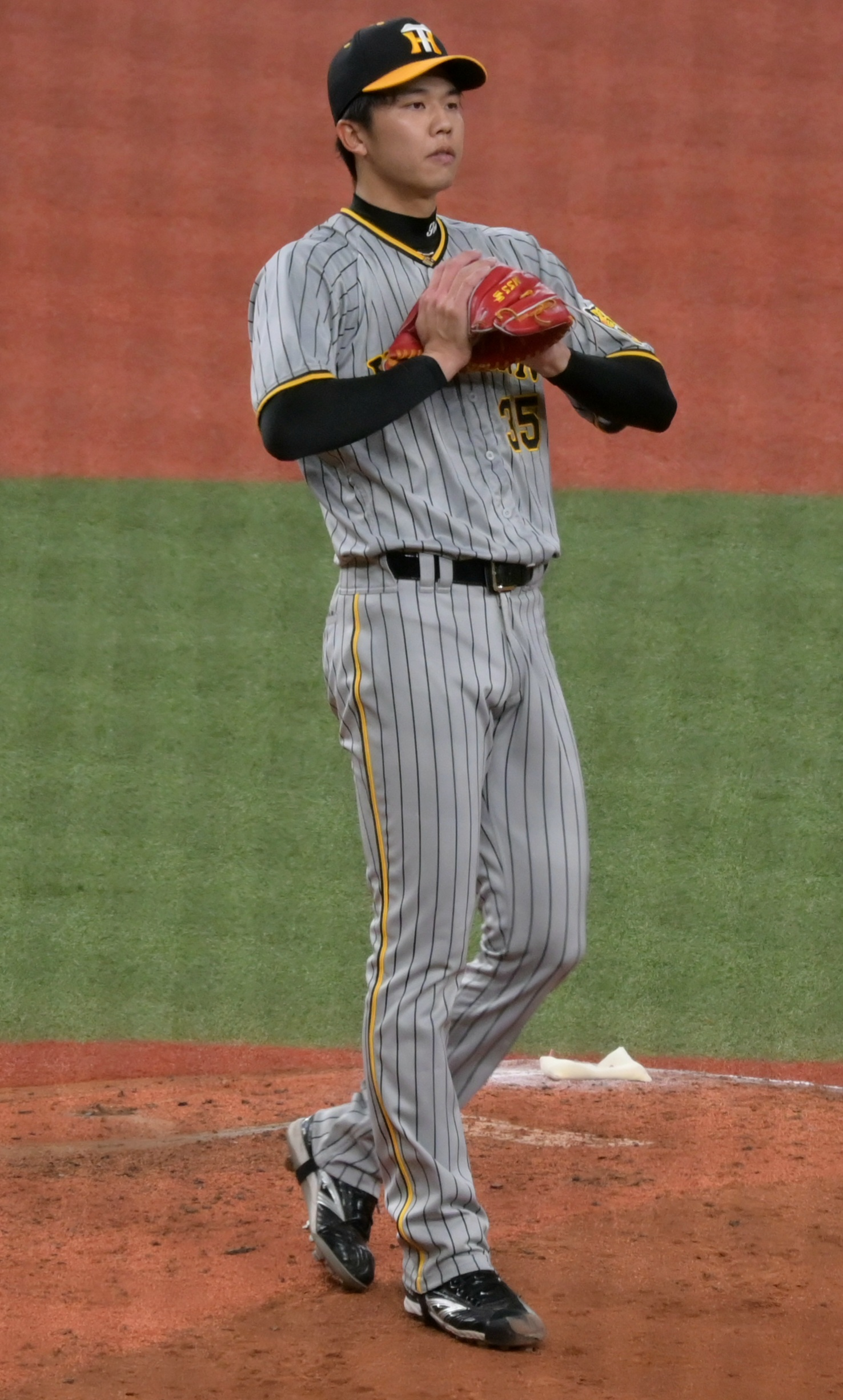
- Saiki with the Hanshin Tigers

Hanshin Tigers – No. 35
- Pitcher
- Born: November 7, 1998 (age 27); Kobe, Hyōgo Prefecture
- Bats: Right Throws: Right

NPB debut
- October 5, 2017, for the Hanshin Tigers

NPB statistics (through August 19, 2026)
- Win–loss: 52–31
- Earned run average: 2.28
- Strikeout: 661
- Stats at Baseball Reference

Teams
- Hanshin Tigers (2017–present)

Career highlights and awards
- Japan Series champion (2023); NPB All-Star (2024); Central League ERA leader (2025)
Medals
Men's baseball
Representing Japan
WBSC Premier12
Silver medal – second place	2024	Team

Hiroto Saiki (才木 浩人, Saiki Hiroto; born November 7, 1998) is a Japanese professional baseball pitcher for the Hanshin Tigers of Nippon Professional Baseball (NPB).

== Early baseball career ==
Hiroto started baseball early when he played catcher for his school's team in his first grade. He specialized as a pitcher in junior high, and helped his team win championships and runner ups in his hometown's local tournaments.

He then went on to become the ace pitcher of Suma Shofu High School, where in his 2nd year, he led the team to win runner-up in the prefectural tournament. Despite his team never making it to either Spring Koshien or Summer Koshien, his 140 km/h fastball caught the attention of both NPB and MLB scouts alike.

== Professional career ==
Hanshin Tigers selected Saiki on the 3rd round of the 2016 NPB draft. He signed a 50 million yen contract with the Tigers, with an estimated 6 million yen annual salary. He was assigned the jersey number 35.

=== 2017 ===
He spent most of the season pitching in Western League (farm) games, where he appeared in 14 games mostly as a starter, and finished with 1-5 record and a 4.88 ERA. Despite this, he was given a chance in the main squad towards the end of the season and debuted as a relief pitcher on the October 5th game against the Dragons where he pitched one scoreless inning and recorded his first hold. He repeated the same performance to end the season with 2 main squad games.

=== 2018 ===
He started the season as the youngest starting pitcher in the main rotation but didn't see any action until May 9, as a reliever against the Giants. He finally got the chance to start on May 20 against the Dragons where he gave away 12 hits and 5 earned runs, earning him his first career loss. He redeemed himself a week later when he pitched 6 scoreless innings against the Giants in Koshien, fanning 7 and giving away only 2 hits to notch his first career win. This also made him the youngest Tigers pitcher to record his first win as a starter against the Giants. His second win came when he rescued starter Yuta Iwasada during a shaky 1st inning on June 30 (1st and 2nd bases loaded, no outs), where he gave away zero earned runs until the 6th inning. Due to the team's shortage in relievers however, he alternated as a starter and middle reliever in his next outings, and went on to replace Kyuji Fujikawa as the main set up pitcher towards the latter half of September. He finished the season with 6-10 and 4.61 ERA out of 22 appearances, and got a salary raise of 15 million yen.

=== 2019 ===
Saiki fell into a slump early in the season and stayed in the farms until he got called back late April. He won his first two starts, but lost his 3rd against the Carps when he gave away 5 runs in 5 innings on May 12, which got him removed again from the main roster. A week later, he felt a tightness in his right elbow during a farm game, got taken off the pitching roster and spent the rest of the season in rehab.

=== 2020–2021 ===
Saiki spent the 2020 season pitching a few farm games, but his elbow condition did not get better so he finally underwent Tommy John Surgery as well as elbow arthroscopic surgery in November 2020. On December 2, he became a free agent and the Tigers signed him under an Ikusei (development) contract on December 8, with jersey number 121 (see Developmental player system). He did not pitch any games in 2021 while he recovered and his salary got cut back to 7 million yen.

=== 2022 ===
After a year and a half off the mound, Saiki finally got to pitch for the first time post-surgery in a practice match with an amateur team in February. He started the season pitching in farm games and finished April with a 2.95 ERA (top 3 in the Western league), which prompted the Tigers to upgrade him from the developmental squad into the main squad on May 4 and assigned him back his old jersey, #35. He continued to pitch in the farm where he recorded his first shutout game on May 26. He eventually got promoted to the main squad on July 3, and earned his first win in 3 years after pitching 5 scoreless innings against the Dragons while clocking at 153 km/h (95 mph). He went on to appear in 8 more games, including the crucial season finale match on October 2, where he pitched 3 scoreless innings in relief until the 12th during a tie-breaker with the Swallows as the bullpen ran out of pitchers. The game ended in a draw, but not recording a loss placed the Tigers in 3rd (just one less loss above the Giants who had the same number of wins) and earned them the final spot in the post-season Climax Series where they eventually finished 2nd. He finished the season with 4-1 and a 1.53 ERA.

== Playing style ==
2023 Pitching Data
Pitch	Percent Thrown	Average velocity
Four-seam	57.8%	149.3 km/h (92.8 mph)
Forkball	23.1%	135.0 km/h (83.9 mph)
Slider	13.6%	135.3 km/h (84.1 mph)
Curve	5.5%	115.4 km/h (71.7 mph)

Standing at 189 cm, Saiki is a right-handed pitcher whose arsenal consists of fastballs clocked at a maximum of 157 km/h (98 mph), sliders, curveballs and forkballs. In addition, he also has recently started throwing a cutter. His fastball spin rates are also known to clock at around 2600 rpm, with some even touching higher than 2700 rpm compared to the average fastball of around 2300 rpm.

== Personal life ==
He aims to follow the footsteps of his teammate and fellow high-school draft Shintaro Fujinami who is known for his high velocity pitches.

When Saiki was in 3rd-year junior high, then Hanshin ace pitcher Atsushi Nomi who also came from the same prefecture conducted a baseball workshop at his school and praised Saiki's pitching form. He told Nomi that he'll end up going to a public high school because none of the private high schools' baseball teams invited him to join. Nomi answered that Saiki will just have to prove them wrong and that he'll tell the scouts where to look.
