= List of Chiba Lotte Marines seasons =

The Chiba Lotte Marines are a professional baseball team in the Pacific League of Nippon Professional Baseball based in Chiba City, Chiba Prefecture in the Kantō region of Japan and owned by Lotte Holdings Co., Ltd.. They are a founding member of the Pacific League since its inception in 1950. Originally known as the Mainichi Orions, they won the inaugural 1950 Japan Series. In 1992, in conjunction with the move to Chiba Marine Stadium, the team rebranded to their current name.

In 76 seasons of play, the Marines have won the Japan Series four times (1950, 1974, 2005, 2010) while winning five Pacific League pennants.

In the playoff era of the Pacific League (1973–1982, 2004-present), the Marines have made the postseason fourteen times (1974, 1977, 1980, 1981, 2005, 2007, 2010, 2013, 2015, 2016, 2020, 2021, 2023, 2024).

== Table key ==
Key to symbols and terms in season table
W	Number of regular season wins
L	Number of regular season losses
T	Number of regular season ties
GB	Games behind from league's first-place team^{[a]}
ROY	Pacific League Rookie of the Year Award
MVP	Pacific League Most Valuable Player Award
ESA	Eiji Sawamura Award^{[b]}
MSA	Matsutaro Shoriki Award
Series MVP	Japan Series Most Valuable Player Award

== Season-by-season records ==
Japan Series Champions (1950–present) †	Pacific League Pennant (1950–present)	Playoff / Climax Series Berth (1973–1982, 2004–present) ^

Season	League	Finish	Wins	Losses	Ties	Win%	GB	Playoffs	Awards
Mainichi Orions
1950	Pacific	1st	81	34	5	.704	—	Won Japan Series (Robins) 4–2	Kaoru Betto (MVP); Kaoru Betto (Series MVP)
1951	Pacific	3rd	54	51	5	.514	22.5		
1952	Pacific	2nd	75	45	0	.625	1		
1953	Pacific	5th	56	62	2	.475	14.5		
1954	Pacific	3rd	79	57	4	.581	10.5		
1955	Pacific	3rd	85	55	2	.607	14		
1956	Pacific	4th	84	66	4	.558	13.5		
1957	Pacific	3rd	75	52	5	.587	8		
Daimai Orions
1958	Pacific	4th	62	63	5	.496	16		
1959	Pacific	2nd	82	48	6	.631	6		
1960	Pacific	1st	82	48	3	.631	—	Lost Japan Series (Whales) 4–0	Kazuhiro Yamauchi (MVP)
1961	Pacific	4th	72	66	2	.521	15		
1962	Pacific	4th	60	70	2	.462	18		
1963	Pacific	5th	64	85	1	.430	23.5		
Tokyo Orions
1964	Pacific	4th	77	68	5	.531	6		
1965	Pacific	5th	62	74	4	.456	25.5		
1966	Pacific	4th	61	69	4	.469	18		
1967	Pacific	5th	61	69	7	.469	14		
1968	Pacific	3rd	67	63	9	.515	13		
Lotte Orions
1969	Pacific	3rd	69	54	7	.561	5.5		
1970	Pacific	1st	80	47	3	.630	—	Lost Japan Series (Giants) (4–1)	Masaaki Kitaru (MVP)
1971	Pacific	2nd	80	46	4	.635	3.5		
1972	Pacific	5th	59	68	3	.465	20.5		
1973	Pacific	2nd/2nd	70	49	11	.588			
1974	Pacific	2nd/1st	69	50	11	.580		Won Pacific League playoffs (Braves) 3–0; Won Japan Series (Dragons) 4–2	Tomehiro Kaneda (MVP); Sumio Hirota (Series MVP)
1975	Pacific	6th/2nd	59	65	6	.476			
1976	Pacific	3rd/3rd	63	56	11	.529			
1977	Pacific	5th/1st	60	57	13	.513		Lost Pacific League playoffs (Braves) 3–2	
1978	Pacific	5th/3rd	53	62	15	.461			
1979	Pacific	4th/3rd	55	63	12	.466			
1980	Pacific	1st/3rd	64	51	15	.557		Lost Pacific League playoffs (Buffaloes) 3–0	
1981	Pacific	1st/3rd	63	57	10	.525		Lost Pacific League playoffs (Fighters) 3–1–1	
1982	Pacific	6th/4th	54	69	7	.439			Hiromitsu Ochiai (MVP)
1983	Pacific	6th	43	76	11	.361	39.5		
1984	Pacific	2nd	64	51	15	.557	8.5		
1985	Pacific	2nd	64	60	6	.516	15		Hiromitsu Ochiai (MVP)
1986	Pacific	4th	57	64	9	.471	13		
1987	Pacific	5th	51	65	14	.440	20		
1988	Pacific	6th	54	74	2	.422	21		
1989	Pacific	6th	48	74	8	.393	21.5		
1990	Pacific	5th	57	71	2	.445	25		
1991	Pacific	6th	48	77	5	.384	33.5		
Chiba Lotte Marines
1992	Pacific	6th	54	74	2	.422	26.5		
1993	Pacific	5th	51	77	2	.398	23.5		
1994	Pacific	5th	55	73	2	.430	21		
1995	Pacific	2nd	69	58	3	.543	12		
1996	Pacific	5th	60	67	3	.472	15.5		
1997	Pacific	6th	57	76	2	.429	19.5		
1998	Pacific	6th	61	71	3	.462	9.5		
1999	Pacific	4th	63	70	2	.474	15.5		
2000	Pacific	5th	62	67	6	.481	9		
2001	Pacific	5th	64	74	2	.464	14		
2002	Pacific	4th	67	72	1	.482	23		
2003	Pacific	4th	68	69	3	.496	1		
2004	Pacific	4th	65	65	3	.500	12.5		
2005	Pacific	1st	84	49	3	.632	–	Won Pacific League Playoffs First Stage (Lions) 2–0; Won Pacific League Playoffs Second Stage (Hawks) 3–2; Won Japan Series (Tigers) (4–0)	Toshiaki Imae (Series MVP)
2006	Pacific	4th	65	70	1	.481	16.5		
2007	Pacific	2nd	76	61	7	.555	2	Won Climax Series First Stage (Hawks) 2–1; Lost Climax Series Second Stage (Fighters) 3–2	
2008	Pacific	4th	73	70	1	.510	4.5		
2009	Pacific	5th	62	77	5	.446	18.5		
2010	Pacific	3rd	75	67	2	.528	2.5	Won Climax Series First Stage (Lions) 2–0; Won Climax Series Final Stage (Hawks) 4–3; Won Japan Series (Dragons) 4–2	Toshiaki Imae (Series MVP)
2011	Pacific	6th	54	79	11	.406	33.5		
2012	Pacific	5th	62	67	15	.481	10		
2013	Pacific	3rd	74	68	2	.521	8.5	Won Climax Series First Stage (Lions) 2–1; Lost Climax Series Final Stage (Golden Eagles) 4–1	
2014	Pacific	4th	66	76	2	.465	14		
2015	Pacific	3rd	73	69	1	.514	18.5	Won Climax Series First Stage (Fighters) 2–1; Lost Climax Series Final Stage (Hawks) 4–0	
2016	Pacific	3rd	72	68	3	.514	15	Lost Climax Series First Stage (Hawks) 2–0	
2017	Pacific	6th	54	87	2	.383	39		
2018	Pacific	5th	59	81	3	.421	28.5		
2019	Pacific	4th	69	70	4	.496	9.5		
2020	Pacific	2nd	60	57	3	.513	14	Lost Climax Series^{[A]} (Hawks) 3–0	
2021	Pacific	2nd	67	57	19	.540	2.5	Won Climax Series First Stage (Golden Eagles) 1–0–1^{[B]} Lost Climax Series Final Stage (Buffaloes) 3–0	
2022	Pacific	5th	69	73	1	.486	7.5		
2023	Pacific	2nd	70	68	5	.507	15.5	Won Climax Series First Stage (Hawks) 2–1; Lost Climax Series Final Stage (Buffaloes) 4–1	
2024	Pacific	3rd	71	66	6	.518	18.5	Lost Climax Series First Stage (Fighters) 2–1	
2025	Pacific	6th	56	84	3	.400	31.5		
2026	Pacific	5th	63	77	3	.450	28.0		

== Notes ==
^{a} This is determined by calculating the difference in wins plus the difference in losses divided by two.
^{b} The award was not open to the Pacific League until 1989. The award was not given out in the following years: 1971, 1980, 1984, 2000, 2019, and 2024.
^{A} Due to the COVID-19 pandemic in 2020, NPB saw both of their leagues modify their playoff format. The Pacific League decided to modify the traditional Climax Series format and eliminate the First Stage series to instead play only one modified Final Stage series while the Central League sent the first-place team directly to the Japan Series, which in this case was Yomiuri.
^{B} By tying Game 2 after winning the first game, Lotte ensured that the Eagles could do no better than tie the three-game series. A tied series results in the higher-seeded team advancing, therefore a Game 3 is not necessary since Lotte would advance no matter the outcome.
