= List of Nippon Professional Baseball players (H) =

The following is a list of Nippon Professional Baseball players with the last name starting with H, retired or active.

== H ==
| Name | Debut | Final Game | Position | Teams | Ref |
|---|---|---|---|---|---|
| Mikinori Hachiuma | | | | | |
| Jun Hagiwara | | | | | |
| Takahiko Hagiwara | | | | | |
| Makoto Hagiwara | | | | | |
| Mel Hall | | | | | |
| Yasuji Hamagiwa | | | | | |
| Chihiro Hamana | | | | | |
| Osamu Hamanaka | | | | | |
| Shinji Hamazaki | | | | | |
| Taro Hamuro | | | | | |
| Masato Hanada | | | | | |
| Ryu Hanekawa | | | | | |
| Chris Haney | | | | | |
| Greg Hansell | | | | | |
| Dave Hansen | | | | | |
| Tadakatsu Hanyuda | | | | | |
| Shinji Hara | | | | | |
| Shunsuke Hara | | | | | |
| Takuya Hara | | | | | |
| Tatsunori Hara | | | | | |
| Kenji Harada | | | | | |
| Masahiko Harada | | | | | |
| Kazuya Harai | | | | | |
| Isao Harimoto | | | | | |
| Dean Hartgraves | | | | | |
| Toshio Haru | | | | | |
| Tsuyoshi Haruta | | | | | |
| Kohei Hasebe | | | | | |
| Yutaka Hasebe | | | | | |
| Masayuki Hasegawa | | | | | |
| Ryohei Hasegawa | | | | | |
| Shigetoshi Hasegawa | | | | | |
| Yuya Hasegawa | | | | | |
| Hideki Hashigami | | | | | |
| Daisuke Hashimoto | | | | | |
| Kei Hashimoto | | | | | |
| Kentaro Hashimoto | | | | | |
| Kiyoshi Hashimoto | | | | | |
| Ryohei Hashimoto | | | | | |
| Takehiro Hashimoto | | | | | |
| Taro Hashimoto | | | | | |
| Tasuku Hashimoto | | | | | |
| Yasuyoshi Hashimoto | | | | | |
| Yoshitaka Hashimoto | | | | | |
| Shinji Hata | | | | | |
| Yuji Hata | | | | | |
| Kazuhiro Hatakeyama | | | | | |
| Hitoshi Hatayama | | | | | |
| Shunji Hatayama | | | | | |
| Kiyoshi Hatsushiba | | | | | |
| Hiroaki Hattori | | | | | |
| Yasutaka Hattori | | | | | |
| Daisuke Hayakawa | | | | | |
| Kenichiro Hayakawa | | | | | |
| Keisuke Hayasaka | | | | | |
| Giichi Hayashi | | | | | |
| Hiroyasu Hayashi | | | | | |
| Junji Hayashi | | | | | |
| Keisuke Hayashi | | | | | |
| Masaki Hayashi | | | | | |
| Masanori Hayashi | | | | | |
| Takaya Hayashi | | | | | |
| Kengo Hayashida | | | | | |
| Hisao Heiuchi | | | | | |
| Toshiyuki Hesaka | | | | | |
| Phil Hiatt | | | | | |
| Takashi Hida | | | | | |
| Takeshi Hidaka | | | | | |
| Toshimitsu Higa | | | | | |
| Masahito Higasa | | | | | |
| Masatoshi Higashi | | | | | |
| Akihiro Higashide | | | | | |
| Osamu Higashio | | | | | |
| Kazutoshi Higuchi | | | | | |
| Ken Higuchi | | | | | |
| Tatsumi Higuchi | | | | | |
| Ryo Hijirisawa | | | | | |
| Toshikatsu Hikono | | | | | |
| Eric Hillman | | | | | |
| Trey Hillman | | | | | |
| Iwao Hirae | | | | | |
| Masafumi Hirai | | | | | |
| Mitsuchika Hirai | | | | | |
| Yosuke Hiraishi | | | | | |
| Kazuhiro Hiramatsu | | | | | |
| Shoji Hiramatsu | | | | | |
| Manabu Hiramoto | | | | | |
| Keiichi Hirano | | | | | |
| Ken Hirano | | | | | |
| Masamitsu Hirano | | | | | |
| Yoshihisa Hirano | | | | | |
| Sadaharu Hiranuma | | | | | |
| Hiroshi Hirao | | | | | |
| Masaki Hiraoka | | | | | |
| Koji Hirashita | | | | | |
| Hiroshi Hirata | | | | | |
| Ryosuke Hirata | | | | | |
| Katsuhiro Hiratsuka | | | | | |
| Koji Hiroike | | | | | |
| Yasutaka Hironaga | | | | | |
| Tatsuro Hirooka | | | | | |
| Katsumi Hirosawa | | | | | |
| Yoshiteru Hirosawa | | | | | |
| Jun Hirose | | | | | |
| Tetsuro Hirose | | | | | |
| Yoshinori Hirose | | | | | |
| Hiroaki Hirota | | | | | |
| Shohji Hirota | | | | | |
| Sumio Hirota | | | | | |
| Yuichi Hisamoto | | | | | |
| Shinjiro Hiyama | | | | | |
| Masayoshi Hizato | | | | | |
| Kazuyuki Hoashi | | | | | |
| Kevin Hodges | | | | | |
| Trey Hodges | | | | | |
| Damon Hollins | | | | | |
| Chris Holt | | | | | |
| Mike Holtz | | | | | |
| Mark Holzemer | | | | | |
| Akihiro Honda | | | | | |
| Yuichi Honda | | | | | |
| Yasuji Hondoh | | | | | |
| Hiroki Hongoh | | | | | |
| Mitsuru Honma | | | | | |
| Tadashi Honma | | | | | |
| Koichi Hori | | | | | |
| Koji Horie | | | | | |
| Ichiro Horita | | | | | |
| Tsuneo Horiuchi | | | | | |
| Dwayne Hosey | | | | | |
| Hidekazu Hoshi | | | | | |
| Takanori Hoshi | | | | | |
| Takahisa Hoshiba | | | | | |
| Junji Hoshino | | | | | |
| Nobuyuki Hoshino | | | | | |
| Osamu Hoshino | | | | | |
| Senichi Hoshino | | | | | |
| Tomoki Hoshino | | | | | |
| Yachiho Hoshino | | | | | |
| Tadahiro Hoshiyama | | | | | |
| Toru Hosokawa | | | | | |
| Kazushi Hosomi | | | | | |
| Naoki Hosomi | | | | | |
| Kei Hosoya | | | | | |
| D. J. Houlton | | | | | |
| Jack Howell | | | | | |
| Hsu Ming-chieh | | | | | |
| Travis Hughes | | | | | |
| Jimmy Hurst | | | | | |
| Jonathan Hurst | | | | | |
| Edwin Hurtado | | | | | |
| Hideharu Hyodoh | | | | | |
| Adam Hyzdu | | | | | |
