= List of Nippon Professional Baseball players (Y) =

The following is a list of Nippon Professional Baseball players with the last name starting with Y, retired or active.

== Y ==
- Keiichi Yabu
- Yasuhiko Yabuta
- Masaki Yachi
- Atsushi Yachida
- Hiroshi Yagi
- Tomoya Yagi
- Tsuyoshi Yaginuma
- Soroku Yagisawa
- Tetsuo Yaguchi
- Futoshi Yamabe
- Akichika Yamada
- Hiroki Yamada - born 1988
- Hiroki Yamada - born 1989
- Hiroshi Yamada
- Hisashi Yamada
- Jun Yamada
- Katsuhiko Yamada
- Kazutoshi Yamada
- Kazuyuki Yamada
- Ken Yamada
- Kikuo Yamada
- Koji Yamada
- Shinsuke Yamada
- Takashi Yamada
- Tsutomu Yamada
- Yuji Yamada
- Minoru Yamagishi
- Kazuo Yamaguchi
- Kosuke Yamaguchi
- Koji Yamaguchi
- Shigeyuki Yamaguchi
- Shun Yamaguchi
- Susumu Yamaguchi
- Tetsuya Yamaguchi
- Yūji Yamaguchi
- Kazutoshi Yamahara
- Daisuke Yamai
- Tomoyuki Yamaji
- Shigetoshi Yamakita
- Ayumu Yamamoto
- Eiji Yamamoto
- Hiroaki Yamamoto
- Hitoshi Yamamoto
- Jun Yamamoto
- Kazunori Yamamoto - born 1957
- Kazunori Yamamoto - born 1983
- Kazuyoshi Yamamoto
- Kenju Yamamoto
- Koji Yamamoto - born 1946
- Koji Yamamoto - born 1951
- Masahiro Yamamoto
- Mitsunobu Yamamoto
- Sho Yamamoto
- Shogo Yamamoto
- Takuji Yamamoto
- Tatsuki Yamamoto
- Yasushi Yamamoto
- Yoshihiko Yamamoto
- Hiroki Yamamura
- Michinao Yamamura
- Kiyoshi Yamanaka
- Tatsuya Yamanaka
- Masahito Yamane
- Yoshinobu Yamane
- Kazuaki Yamano
- Hiroyuki Yamaoka
- Ken Yamasaki
- Koji Yamasaki
- Shintaro Yamasaki
- Takeshi Yamasaki
- Daisuke Yamashita
- Hironobu Yamashita
- Katsumi Yamashita
- Kazuhiko Yamashita
- Kazuteru Yamashita
- Norihito Yamashita
- Kazuhiro Yamauchi
- Keita Yamauchi
- Soma Yamauchi
- Yasuyuki Yamauchi
- Yoshihiro Yamauchi
- Kaname Yamazaki
- Katsuki Yamazaki
- Kazuharu Yamazaki
- Kenichi Yamazaki
- Kenta Yamazaki
- Masataka Yamazaki
- Satoshi Yamazaki
- Takahiro Yamazaki - born 1976
- Takahiro Yamazaki - born 1978
- Esteban Yan
- Yao-Hsun Yang
- Masao Yanada
- Masatoshi Yanagida
- Shigeo Yanagida
- Yuichi Yanagisawa
- Shikato Yanagita
- Akihiro Yanase
- Dai-Kang Yang
- Akihiro Yano
- Eiji Yano
- Kenji Yano
- Masayuki Yano
- Minoru Yano
- Satoshi Yano
- Shuhei Yano
- Ed Yarnall
- Kaname Yashiki
- Hideyuki Yasuda
- Masatoshi Yasuhara
- Kohichi Yasui
- Tsuyoshi Yoda
- Tetsu Yohfu
- Minoru Yojoh
- Fuminori Yokogawa
- Yusuke Yokokawa
- Toshikazu Yokomatsu
- Hisanori Yokota
- Masashi Yokota
- Akimasa Yokotani
- Ryuji Yokoyama
- Ryunosuke Yokoyama
- Tetsuya Yokoyama
- Yukiya Yokoyama
- Kaname Yonamine
- Masahide Yone
- Tetsuya Yoneda
- Kazuki Yonemura
- Tomohito Yoneno
- Kunji Yonezaki
- Atsushi Yoshida
- Hiroshi Yoshida
- Kei Yoshida
- Kota Yoshida
- Naoki Yoshida
- Shintaro Yoshida
- Shuji Yoshida
- Takashi Yoshida
- Tohru Yoshida
- Toyohiko Yoshida
- Yasuo Yoshida
- Yoshio Yoshida
- Yukihiro Yoshida
- Eishiro Yoshie
- Kosuke Yoshihara
- Michiomi Yoshihara
- Masato Yoshii
- Katsunari Yoshikawa
- Masahiro Yoshikawa
- Mitsuo Yoshikawa
- Motohiro Yoshikawa
- Teruaki Yoshikawa
- Kazuki Yoshimi
- Taichi Yoshimi
- Yuji Yoshimi
- Kazuyoshi Yoshimoto
- Ryo Yoshimoto - born 1969
- Ryo Yoshimoto - born 1980
- Shinji Yoshimoto
- Kazuhito Yoshimura
- Masaki Yoshimura
- Sadaaki Yoshimura
- Yuki Yoshimura
- Koichiro Yoshinaga
- Makoto Yoshino
- Yuji Yoshioka
- Haruki Yoshitake
- Shintaro Yoshitake
- Takinori Yoshitoshi
- Kenji Yoshitsuru
- Masaru Yoshizaki
- Ernie Young
- Tim Young
- Wen-bin Yu
- Yoshio Yuasa
- Toshiro Yufune
- Hiroshi Yugamidani
- Tatsuhiro Yuminaga
