= 2005 Pacific League Playoffs =

Japanese baseball series

First stage
Team (Wins)		Manager	Season
Chiba Lotte Marines (2)		Bobby Valentine	84–49–3 (.632), 4.5 GB
Seibu Lions (0)		Tsutomu Ito	67–69 (.493), 23 GB
- Dates: October 8–9

Second stage
Team (Wins)		Manager	Season
Chiba Lotte Marines (3)		Bobby Valentine	84–49–3 (.632), 4.5 GB
Fukuoka SoftBank Hawks (2)		Sadaharu Oh	89–45–2 (.664), 4.5 GA
- Dates: October 12–17

The 2005 Pacific League Playoffs was a set of consecutive playoff series for the Pacific League of Nippon Professional Baseball (NPB) in the 2005 season.

== First stage ==
=== Summary ===
Chiba Lotte Marines won the series, 2–0.

Game	Date	Score	Location	Time	Attendance
1	October 8	Seibu Lions – 1, Chiba Lotte Marines – 2	Chiba Marine Stadium	3:33	28,979
2	October 9	Seibu Lions – 1, Chiba Lotte Marines – 3	Chiba Marine Stadium	2:52	28,996

=== Game 1 ===
Saturday, October 8, 2005, 2:00 pm (JST) at Chiba Marine Stadium in Chiba, Chiba Prefecture
Team	1	2	3	4	5	6	7	8	9	R	H	E
Seibu	1	0	0	0	0	0	0	0	0	1	8	1
Lotte	0	0	0	0	1	0	0	1	X	2	8	0
WP: Yasuhiko Yabuta (1–0) LP: Koji Mitsui (0–1) Sv: Masahide Kobayashi (1); Home runs: SEI: Takumi Kuriyama (1); LOT: None; Attendance: 28,979

=== Game 2 ===
Sunday, October 9, 2005, 2:00 pm (JST) at Chiba Marine Stadium in Chiba, Chiba Prefecture
Team	1	2	3	4	5	6	7	8	9	R	H	E
Seibu	0	0	0	0	0	0	0	1	0	1	4	0
Lotte	1	0	0	0	0	2	0	0	X	3	9	0
WP: Hiroyuki Kobayashi (1–0) LP: Fumiya Nishiguchi (0–1) Sv: Masahide Kobayashi (2); Home runs: SEI: Takeya Nakamura (1); LOT: None; Attendance: 28,996

== Second stage ==
=== Summary ===
Chiba Lotte Marines won the series, 3–2.

Game	Date	Score	Location	Time	Attendance
1	October 12	Chiba Lotte Marines – 4, Fukuoka SoftBank Hawks – 2	Fukuoka Yahoo! Japan Dome	3:28	31,848
2	October 13	Chiba Lotte Marines – 3, Fukuoka SoftBank Hawks – 2	Fukuoka Yahoo! Japan Dome	2:54	31,696
3	October 15	Chiba Lotte Marines – 4, Fukuoka SoftBank Hawks – 5 (10)	Fukuoka Yahoo! Japan Dome	3:48	34,757
4	October 16	Chiba Lotte Marines – 2, Fukuoka SoftBank Hawks – 3	Fukuoka Yahoo! Japan Dome	3:06	34,772
5	October 17	Chiba Lotte Marines – 3, Fukuoka SoftBank Hawks – 2	Fukuoka Yahoo! Japan Dome	3:46	35,071

=== Game 1 ===
Wednesday, October 12, 2005, 6:00 pm (JST) at Fukuoka Yahoo! Japan Dome in Fukuoka, Fukuoka Prefecture
Team	1	2	3	4	5	6	7	8	9	R	H	E
Lotte	0	0	0	1	0	0	1	2	0	4	11	0
SoftBank	0	1	0	0	0	0	1	0	0	2	7	0
WP: Soichi Fujita (1–0) LP: Toshiya Sugiuchi (0–1) Sv: Masahide Kobayashi (1); Home runs: LOT: Tomoya Satozaki (1); SOF: Jolbert Cabrera (1); Attendance: 31,848

=== Game 2 ===
Thursday, October 13, 2005, 6:00 pm (JST) at Fukuoka Yahoo! Japan Dome in Fukuoka, Fukuoka Prefecture
Team	1	2	3	4	5	6	7	8	9	R	H	E
Lotte	0	0	0	0	0	3	0	0	0	3	6	0
SoftBank	0	0	0	0	1	1	0	0	0	2	4	0
WP: Naoyuki Shimizu (1–0) LP: Kazumi Saito (0–1) Sv: Masahide Kobayashi (2); Home runs: LOT: None; SOF: Munenori Kawasaki (1), Jolbert Cabrera (2); Attendance: 31,696

=== Game 3 ===
Saturday, October 15, 2005, 6:00 pm (JST) at Fukuoka Yahoo! Japan Dome in Fukuoka, Fukuoka Prefecture
Team	1	2	3	4	5	6	7	8	9	10	R	H	E
Lotte	0	0	2	0	0	0	0	2	0	0	4	9	1
SoftBank	0	0	0	0	0	0	0	0	4	1X	5	15	0
WP: Takahiro Mahara (1–0) LP: Shingo Ono (0–1); Attendance: 34,757

=== Game 4 ===
Sunday, October 16, 2005, 6:00 pm (JST) at Fukuoka Yahoo! Japan Dome in Fukuoka, Fukuoka Prefecture
Team	1	2	3	4	5	6	7	8	9	R	H	E
Lotte	1	0	0	1	0	0	0	0	0	2	5	0
SoftBank	0	1	0	2	0	0	0	0	X	3	5	0
WP: Shintaro Yoshitake (1–0) LP: Hiroyuki Kobayashi (0–1) Sv: Takahiro Mahara (1); Home runs: LOT: Tomoya Satozaki (2); SOF: Julio Zuleta 2 (2); Attendance: 34,772

=== Game 5 ===
Monday, October 17, 2005, 6:00 pm (JST) at Fukuoka Yahoo! Japan Dome in Fukuoka, Fukuoka Prefecture
Team	1	2	3	4	5	6	7	8	9	R	H	E
Lotte	0	0	0	0	0	1	0	2	0	3	12	1
SoftBank	0	1	1	0	0	0	0	0	0	2	5	0
WP: Soichi Fujita (2–0) LP: Koji Mise (0–1) Sv: Masahide Kobayashi (3); Attendance: 35,071
