= 1974 Japan Series =

Team (Wins)	Managers	Season
Lotte Orions (4)	Masaichi Kaneda	69–50–11 (.580)
Chunichi Dragons (2)	Wally Yonamine	70–49–11 (.588), 0 GA
- Dates: October 16–23
- MVP: Sumio Hirota (Lotte)
- FSA: Morimichi Takagi (Chunichi)

The 1974 Japan Series was the championship series of Nippon Professional Baseball (NPB) for the 1974 season. The 25th edition of the series, it matched the Central League champion Chunichi Dragons against the Pacific League champion Lotte Orions. This was the first Japan Series since 1964 without the Yomiuri Giants, who had won the previous nine championships; the Dragons had edged them out for the Central pennant by percentage points after losing one game less than the Giants with two more ties). The Orions defeated the Dragons in six games to win their second title, and first since winning the inaugural Japan Series under the Mainichi branding.

== Summary ==
Game	Score	Date	Location	Attendance
1	Dragons – 5, Orions – 4	October 16	Nagoya Stadium	22,148
2	Dragons – 5, Orions – 8	October 17	Nagoya Stadium	24,798
3	Orions – 4, Dragons – 5	October 19	Korakuen Stadium	29,103
4	Orions – 6, Dragons – 3	October 20	Korakuen Stadium	43,128
5	Orions – 2, Dragons – 0	October 21	Korakuen Stadium	28,187
6	Dragons – 2, Orions – 3	October 23	Nagoya Stadium	23,433

== See also ==
- 1974 World Series
