= Takaya Hayashi =

Japanese baseball player (born 1973)

Hokkaido Nippon Ham Fighters – No. 77
- Infielder / Coach
- Born: June 1, 1973 (age 52)
- Batted: Right Threw: Right

NPB debut
- September 3, 1995, for the Fukuoka Daiei Hawks

Last appearance
- June 9, 2005, for the Chiba Lotte Marines

NPB statistics
- Batting average: .237
- Hits: 94
- Home runs: 12
- Runs batted in: 57
- Stolen base: 0

Teams
- As player: Fukuoka Daiei Hawks (1992–2002); Nippon-Ham Fighters/Hokkaido Nippon-Ham Fighters (2002–2004); Chiba Lotte Marines (2005–2006); As coach: Fukuoka SoftBank Hawks (2009–2010); Hokkaido Nippon-Ham Fighters (2014–2017, 2022–present)

Career highlights and awards
- 2× Japan Series champion (1999, 2005)

Takaya Hayashi (林 孝哉, Hayashi Takaya; born June 1, 1973 in Wakayama, Wakayama) is a Japanese retired professional baseball infielder.
