= 1974 Nippon Professional Baseball season =

1974 NPB season
- League: Nippon Professional Baseball
- Sport: Baseball

Regular season
- Season MVP: CL: Sadaharu Oh (YOM); PL: Tomehiro Kaneda (LOT)

League postseason
- CL champions: Chunichi Dragons
- CL runners-up: Yomiuri Giants
- PL champions: Lotte Orions
- PL runners-up: Hankyu Braves

Japan Series
- Champions: Lotte Orions
- Runners-up: Chunichi Dragons
- Finals MVP: Sumio Hirota (LOT)

NPB seasons
- ← 1973 1975 →

The 1974 Nippon Professional Baseball season was the 25th season of operation for the league. For the first time since 1964, the Yomiuri Giants did not qualify for the Japan Series. On October 12, the Chunichi Dragons prevailed to win the Central League pennant by winning a double-header over the Taiyo Whales to prevail by percentage points over the Giants with two games remaining; at the end of the season, with ties not counting in the standings, the Dragons were at .588 with their record of 70-49 while the Giants were at .587 with a record of 71-50. Dragons manager Wally Yonamine (born in Hawaii) became the first American-born manager to lead a team to the pennant. It was the final season for Giants star Shigeo Nagashima, who subsequently became manager of the team following the retirement of Tetsuharu Kawakami. For the first time in ten years, the Central League awarded its MVP to a player from a team that did not win the league pennant, as Sadaharu Oh was named MVP for the seventh time in his career. Clarence Jones of the Kintetsu Buffaloes became the first foreign-born player to win the home run title in the two-league system with his 38 home runs leading all of the Pacific League.

In the Pacific League, the Hankyu Braves clinched the first-half. On September 26, the Lotte Orions were guaranteed the second-half pennant when the Fighters and Hawks game ended in a tie that eliminated the possibility of a tie with percentage points. The Lotte Orions, champions of the second-half, defeated the first-half champion Hankyu Braves to reach their second Japan Series in four years. Lotte defeated Chunichi in six games for their first championship since 1950.

== Regular season standings ==
=== Central League ===
Central League	G	W	L	T	Pct.	GB
Chunichi Dragons	130	70	49	11	.588	–
Yomiuri Giants	130	71	50	9	.587	0.0
Yakult Swallows	130	60	63	7	.488	12.0
Hanshin Tigers	130	57	64	9	.471	14.0
Taiyo Whales	130	55	69	6	.444	17.5
Hiroshima Toyo Carp	130	54	72	4	.429	19.5

=== Pacific League ===
Pacific League	G	W	L	T	Pct.	1st half ranking	2nd half ranking
Lotte Orions	130	69	50	11	.580	2	1
Hankyu Braves	130	69	51	10	.575	1	3
Nankai Hawks	130	59	55	16	.518	4	2
Taiheiyo Club Lions	130	59	64	7	.480	3	4
Kintetsu Buffaloes	130	56	66	8	.459	5	4
Nippon-Ham Fighters	130	49	75	6	.395	6	6

== Pacific League playoff ==
The Pacific League teams with the best first and second-half records met in a best-of-five playoff series to determine the league representative in the Japan Series.

Lotte Orions won the series 3–0.

Game	Score	Date	Location
1	Braves – 2, Orions – 3	October 5	Hankyu Nishinomiya Stadium
2	Braves – 3, Orions – 8	October 6	Hankyu Nishinomiya Stadium
3	Orions – 4, Braves – 0	October 9	Miyagi Baseball Stadium

== Japan Series ==
Lotte Orions won the series 4–2.

Game	Score	Date	Location	Attendance
1	Dragons – 5, Orions – 4	October 16	Nagoya Stadium	22,148
2	Dragons – 5, Orions – 8	October 17	Nagoya Stadium	24,798
3	Orions – 4, Dragons – 5	October 19	Korakuen Stadium	29,103
4	Orions – 6, Dragons – 3	October 20	Korakuen Stadium	43,128
5	Orions – 2, Dragons – 0	October 21	Korakuen Stadium	28,187
6	Dragons – 2, Orions – 3	October 23	Nagoya Stadium	23,433

== See also ==
- 1974 Major League Baseball season
