= Tomohiro Kuroki =

Japanese baseball player and coach

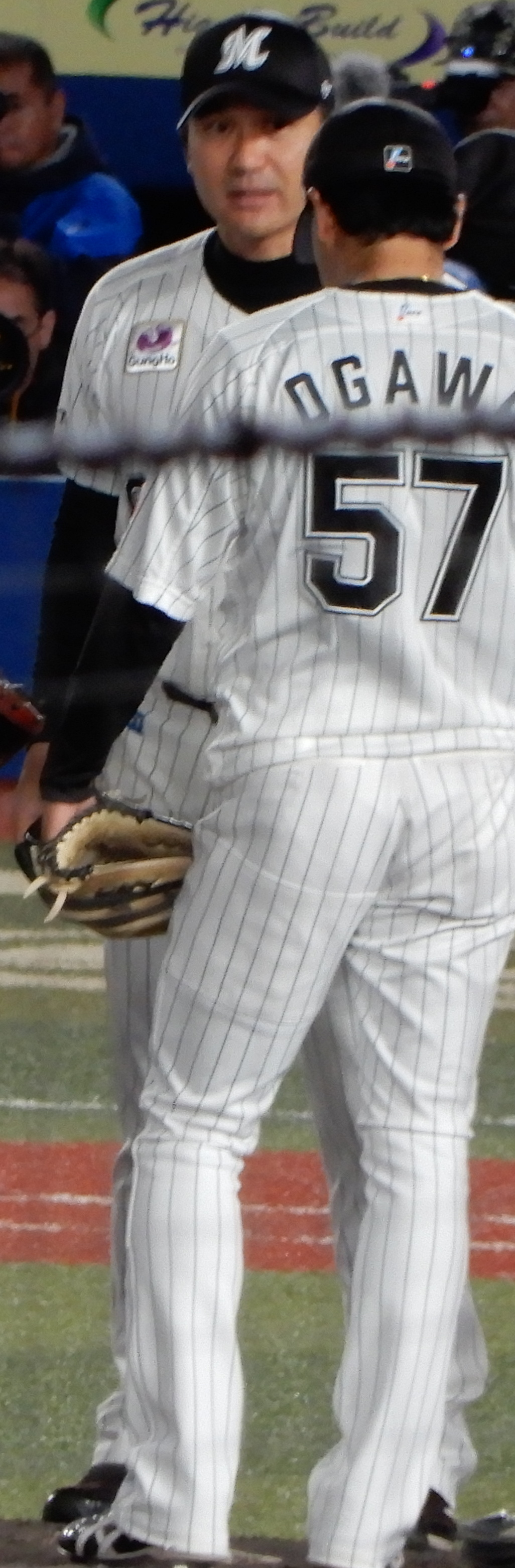

Chiba Lotte Marines – No. 84
- Pitcher / Coach
- Born: December 13, 1973 (age 52); Hyūga, Miyazaki, Japan
- Batted: Right Threw: Right

NPB debut
- April 6, 1995, for the Chiba Lotte Marines

Last NPB appearance
- April 27, 2007, for the Chiba Lotte Marines

NPB statistics (through 2007)
- Win–loss record: 76-68
- Saves: 1
- ERA: 3.43
- Strikeouts: 879
- Stats at Baseball Reference

Teams
- As player: Chiba Lotte Marines (1995–2007); As coach: Hokkaido Nippon-Ham Fighters (2013–2017); Chiba Lotte Marines (2023–)

Career highlights and awards
- Japan Series champion (2005); 3× NPB All-Star (1998–1999, 2001); 1× Pacific League Win title (1998)
- Last updated on: 15 December 2022

Tomohiro "Johnny" Kuroki (黒木 知宏, born December 13, 1973, in Hyūga, Miyazaki, Japan) is a former Nippon Professional Baseball pitcher.

== Career ==
Kuroki's debut in the NPB marked the beginning of a distinguished career, characterized by his right-handed throws and strategic gameplay. Throughout his career, he achieved a win-loss record of 76–68, saved one game, and maintained an ERA of 3.43, alongside accumulating 879 strikeouts.

His prowess on the mound earned him three NPB All-Star selections in 1998, 1999, and 2001, and he led the Pacific League in wins in 1998. Kuroki's contributions were pivotal in securing the Japan Series championship for the Chiba Lotte Marines in 2005. Beyond his domestic success, Kuroki also represented Japan on the international stage, notably at the 2000 Summer Olympics in Sydney, where the Japanese national baseball team finished fourth.

Kuroki's influence in baseball extended beyond his playing days as he transitioned into coaching, sharing his expertise with the Hokkaido Nippon-Ham Fighters from 2013 to 2017, and later returning to the Chiba Lotte Marines in 2023. His coaching career has been marked by the same dedication and strategic insight that characterized his time as a player.

Renowned for his sportsmanship and leadership, Kuroki's legacy in the NPB is not solely defined by his statistics but also by the inspiration he provided to teammates and opponents alike. His career stands as a testament to his skill and dedication to the sport of baseball. For more detailed statistics and information about Tomohiro Kuroki's career, one can refer to resources such as Baseball Reference.
