= Shunichi Nemoto =

Japanese baseball player

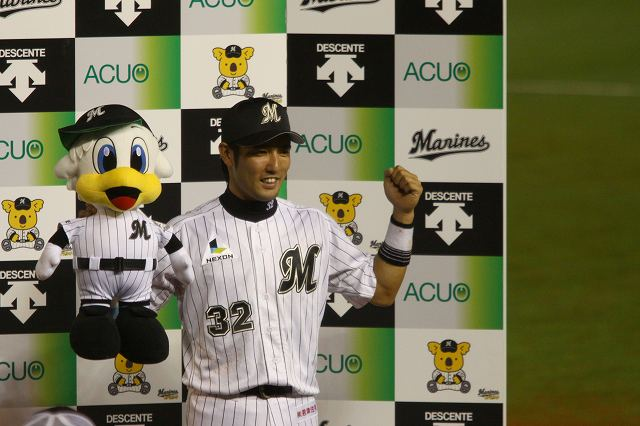
- Nemoto with the Chiba Lotte Marines

Chiba Lotte Marines – No. 70
- Infielder / Coach
- Born: July 8, 1983 (age 42); Tokyo, Japan
- Bats: Left Throws: Right

debut
- 2006, for the Chiba Lotte Marines

Career statistics (through 2016 season)
- Batting average: .253
- Hits: 551
- Runs batted in: 192
- Stats at Baseball Reference

Teams
- As player: Chiba Lotte Marines (2006–2018); As coach: Chiba Lotte Marines (2019–present)

Shunichi Nemoto (根元 俊一, Nemoto Shun'ichi), nicknamed "Nemo", is a former Japanese professional baseball infielder. He was born on July 8, 1983. He is currently playing for the Chiba Lotte Marines of the NPB.
