= Soichi Fujita =

Japanese baseball player

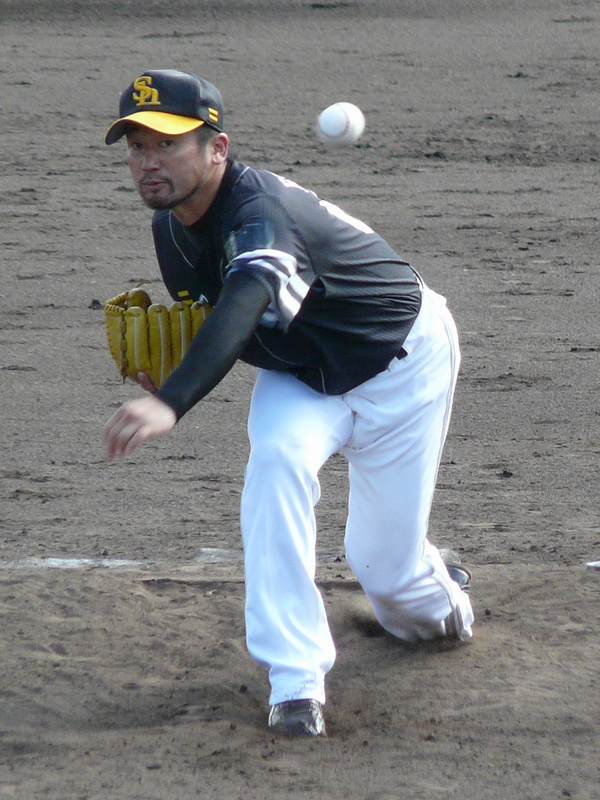
- Pitcher
- Born: October 17, 1972 (age 53); Kyoto, Japan
- Batted: Left Threw: Left

NPB debut
- April 4, 1998, for the Chiba Lotte Marines

Last Baseball Challenge League appearance
- 2012, for the Gunma Diamond Pegasus

NPB statistics (through 2011 season)
- Appearances: 600
- Win–loss: 19–21
- ERA: 3.89
- Strikeouts: 366
- Stats at Baseball Reference

Teams
- Chiba Lotte Marines (1998–2007); Yomiuri Giants (2008–2010); Fukuoka SoftBank Hawks (2011); Gunma Diamond Pegasus (2012)

Career highlights and awards
- 2006 World Baseball Classic champions (Japan); NPB All-Star (2001); Pacific League Hold Champion (2000); 2× Japan Series champion (2005, 2009)
Medals
Representing Japan
Men's baseball
World Baseball Classic
Gold medal – first place	2006 San Diego	Team

Soichi Fujita (藤田 宗一, Fujita Soichi; born October 17, 1972 in Yawata, Kyoto, Japan) is a retired Japanese left-handed relief pitcher who played most of his career in Nippon Professional Baseball.

Fujita was part of the Japanese national baseball team in the 2006 World Baseball Classic.

He pitched every game of his career in relief and holds the Japanese record for most pitching appearances.
