= Takeshi Kanazawa =

Japanese baseball player (born 1984)

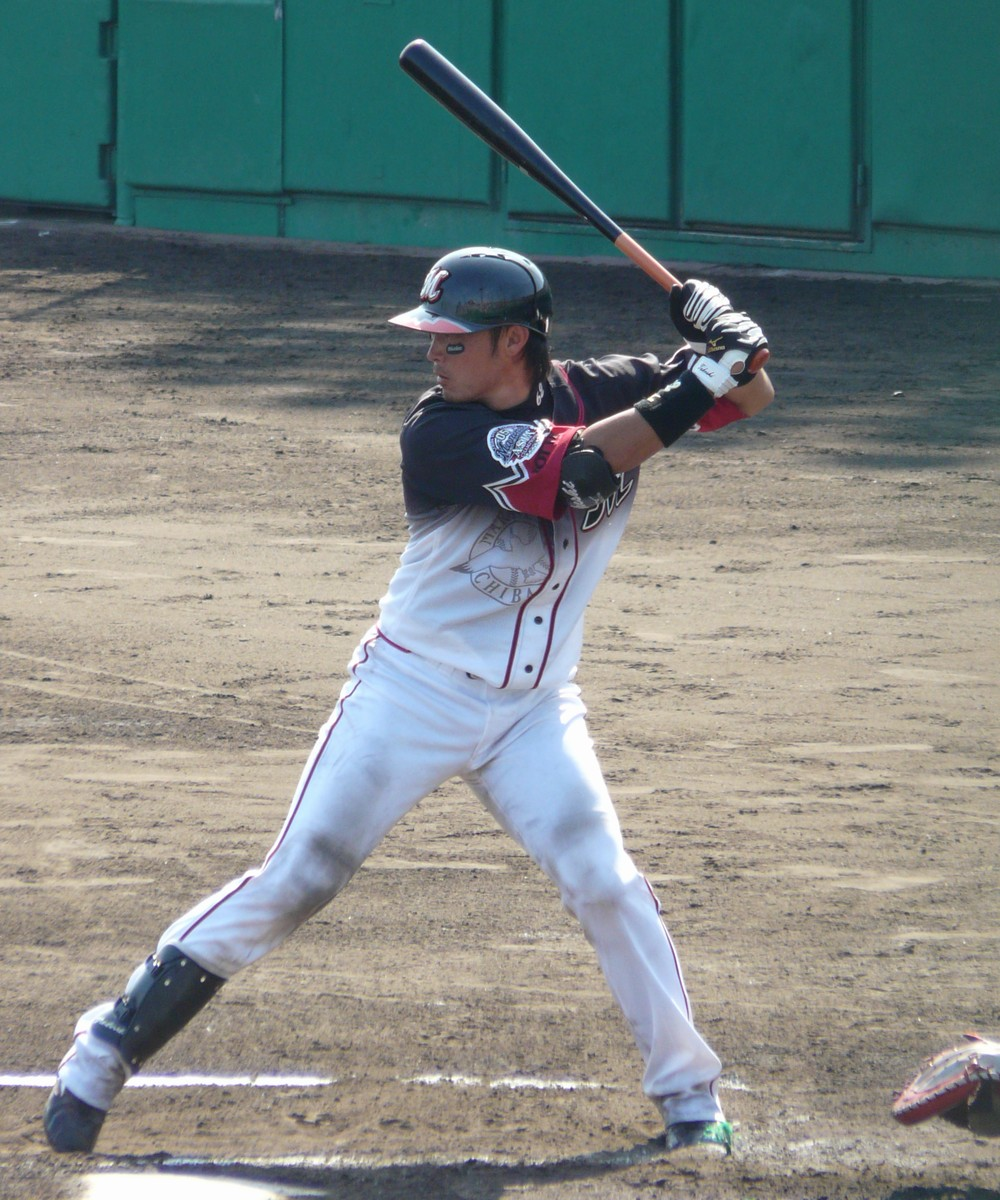
- Kanazawa with the Chiba Lotte Marines

Chiba Lotte Marines – No. 73
- Catcher / Coach
- Born: May 5, 1984 (age 42)
- Bats: Left Throws: Right

NPB debut
- 2008, for the Chiba Lotte Marines

NPB statistics (through 2018)
- Batting average: .230
- Home runs: 1
- RBI: 27
- Stats at Baseball Reference

Teams
- As player: Chiba Lotte Marines (2008–2014, 2016–2018); As coach: Chiba Lotte Marines (2019–present)

Takeshi Kanazawa (金澤 岳; born May 5, 1984, in Tondabayashi), nicknamed "Kin", is a Japanese former professional baseball catcher in Japan's Nippon Professional Baseball. He played for the Chiba Lotte Marines from 2008 to 2014 and from 2016 to 2018.
