= Hideaki Matsuyama =

Japanese baseball player and coach

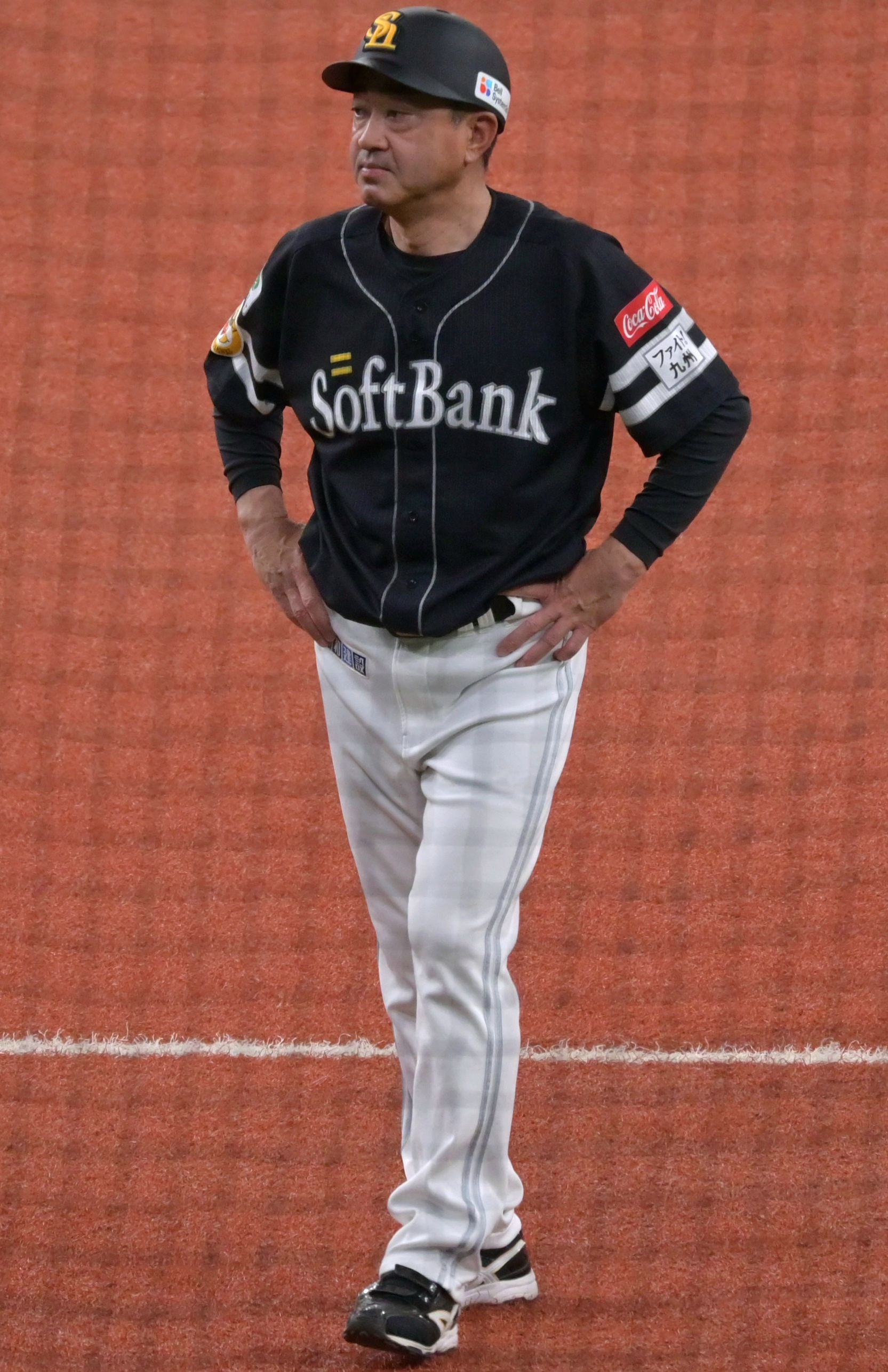
- Matsuyama's coach era of the Fukuoka SoftBank Hawks.

Chiba Lotte Marines – No. 80
- Infielder / Coach / Manager
- Born: April 18, 1967; Ito, Wakayama, Japan
- Batted: Right Threw: Right

NPB debut
- June 61, 1990, for the Orix BlueWave

Last appearance
- October 9, 1998, for the Orix BlueWave

NPB statistics
- Batting average: .253
- Hits: 25
- Home runs: 2
- Runs batted in: 7
- Stolen base: 12
- Stats at Baseball Reference

Teams
- As player: Orix BlueWave (1990–1998); As coach: Orix BlueWave (1999–2001); Hanshin Tigers (2002–2004); Orix Buffaloes (2005–2011); Kia Tigers (2012); Chiba Lotte Marines (2013–2017); Fukuoka SoftBank Hawks (2018–2025); Chiba Lotte Marines (2026–present)

Hideaki Matsuyama (松山 秀明, Matsuyama Hideaki; born April 18, 1967) is a Japanese former professional baseball infielder, and current the second squad manager for the Fukuoka SoftBank Hawks of Nippon Professional Baseball (NPB).

He previously played for the Orix Blue Wave.

== Early baseball career ==
Matsuyama was a classmate and captain of the famous KK duo Kazuhiro Kiyohara and Masumi Kuwata at PL Gakuen High School. In 1985, he hit a walk-off hit in the final game of the 67th Japanese High School Baseball Championship between Ube Commercial High School and PL Gakuen High School in the summer of his junior year, which was considered a great game.

He went on to Aoyama Gakuin University, where he won the 1988 Tohto University Baseball League Fall League championship, the first in 106 years since the team's inception.

== Professional career ==
=== Active player era ===
On November 26, 1989, Matsuyama was drafted fifth overall by the Orix Braves in the 1989 Nippon Professional Baseball draft. He was a member of the Orix Blue Wave for eight seasons, with a total of 126 games played, a .253 batting average, two home runs, and seven RBI, but was regarded as a defensive specialist. Matsuyama retired during the 1998 season.

=== After retirement ===
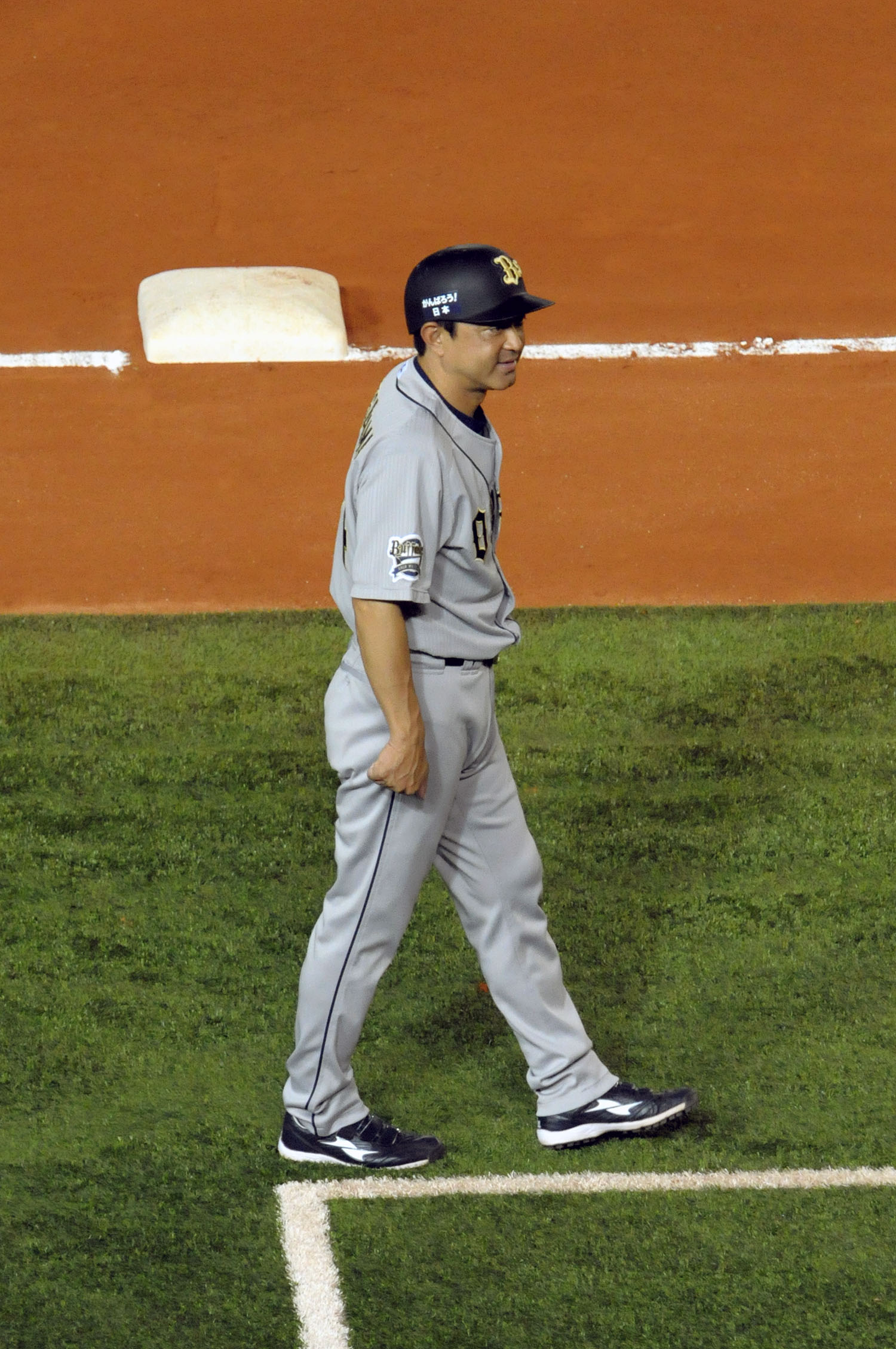
Matsuyama with the Orix Buffaloes.

After his retirement, Matsuyama served as the first squad infield and base coach for the Orix Blue Wave from the 1999 to 2001 seasons, the first squad infield and base coach for the Hanshin Tigers in the 2002 season, and the second squad infield and base coach from the 2003 to 2004 seasons.

He again returned to the Orix Buffaloes for the 2005 season and served as the first squad infield defensive base coach through the 2011 season. He coached Korea Baseball Organization's the Kia Tigers during the 2012 season.

Matsuyama became the Chiba Lotte Marines' second squad infield defensive base coach in the 2013 season and was the first squad infield defensive base coach from the 2015 to 2017 seasons.

Matsuyama became the Fukuoka SoftBank Hawks' second squad infield defensive base coach for the 2018 season, the third squad infield defensive base coach for the 2021 season, and again the second squad infield defensive base coach for the 2022 season. Beginning with the 2023 season he served as the first squad infield defensive base coach. On December 2, 2023, he was transferred to the second squad manager. Matsuyama has been described as an enthusiastic coach, he continues to wear the Fukuoka uniform as a coach since his retirement.
