= Soroku Yagisawa =

Japanese baseball player, coach and manager (born 1944)

Sōroku Yagisawa
- Pitcher/Coach/Manager
- Born: 1 December 1944; Nikkō, Tochigi, Japan
- Batted: Right Threw: Right

NPB debut
- August 11, 1967, for the Tokyo Orions

Last NPB appearance
- October 20, 1979, for the Lotte Orions

NPB statistics
- Win–loss record: 71–66
- Earned run average: 3.32
- Strikeouts: 567
- Saves: 8
- Stats at Baseball Reference

Teams
- As player: Tokyo Orions/Lotte Orions (1967–1979); As manager: Chiba Lotte Marines (1992–1994); As coach: Lotte Orions (1976–1980); Seibu Lions (1981–1994); Yokohama BayStars (1995); Yomiuri Giants (1997–1998); Hanshin Tigers (1999–2001); Orix BlueWave (2004); Tokyo Gas (2006–2007); Tokyo Yakult Swallows (2008–2010); Gunma Diamond Pegasus (2011–2012)

Career highlights and awards
- 1× Pacific League Winning percentage Leader Award (1973); Pitched a perfect game (October 10, 1973)
- Last updated on: January 18, 2026

Sōroku Yagisawa (八木沢 荘六, Yagisawa Sōroku; born December 1, 1944 in Nikkō, Tochigi, Japan) is a Japanese former Nippon Professional Baseball pitcher. He played for the Tokyo Orions and Lotte Orions. He later managed the Chiba Lotte Marines.
