= 2015 Pacific League Climax Series =

Japanese baseball series

First stage
Team (Wins)		Manager	Season
Chiba Lotte Marines (2)		Tsutomu Ito	73–69–1 (.514), 18½ GB
Hokkaido Nippon-Ham Fighters (1)		Hideki Kuriyama	79–62–2 (.560), 12 GB
- Dates: October 10–12

Final stage
Team (Wins)		Manager	Season
Fukuoka SoftBank Hawks (4)		Kimiyasu Kudo	90–49–4 (.647), 12 GA
Chiba Lotte Marines (0)		Tsutomu Ito	73–69–1 (.514), 18½ GB
- Dates: October 14–16
- MVP: Seiichi Uchikawa (Hawks)

The 2015 Pacific League Climax Series (PLCS) consisted of two consecutive series, Stage 1 being a best-of-three series and Stage 2 being a best-of-six with the top seed being awarded a one-win advantage. The winner of the series advanced to the 2015 Japan Series, where they competed against the 2015 Central League Climax Series winner. The top three regular-season finishers played in the two series. The PLCS began on with the first game of Stage 1 on October 10 and ended with the final game of Stage 2 on October 16.

== First stage ==
=== Summary ===
Chiba Lotte Marines won the series, 2–1.

Game	Date	Score	Location	Time	Attendance
1	October 10	Chiba Lotte Marines – 9, Hokkaido Nippon-Ham Fighters – 3	Sapporo Dome	3:28	41,138
2	October 11	Chiba Lotte Marines – 2, Hokkaido Nippon-Ham Fighters – 4	Sapporo Dome	3:06	41,138
3	October 12	Chiba Lotte Marines – 2, Hokkaido Nippon-Ham Fighters – 1	Sapporo Dome	3:42	32,201

=== Game 1 ===
Saturday, October 10, 2015 at Sapporo Dome in Sapporo, Hokkaido
Team	1	2	3	4	5	6	7	8	9	R	H	E
Lotte	0	3	2	0	0	2	1	1	0	9	11	0
Nippon-Ham	1	0	1	0	0	0	1	0	0	3	8	0
WP: Ayumu Ishikawa (1–0) LP: Shohei Ohtani (0–1); Home runs: LOT: Ikuhiro Kiyota (1); NIP: None

=== Game 2 ===
Sunday, October 11, 2015 at Sapporo Dome in Sapporo, Hokkaido
Team	1	2	3	4	5	6	7	8	9	R	H	E
Lotte	1	0	0	0	0	1	0	0	0	2	8	1
Nippon-Ham	0	0	0	0	1	0	0	3	X	4	9	0
WP: Kohei Arihara (1–0) LP: Tomohisa Otani (0–1) Sv: Hirotoshi Masui (1)

=== Game 3 ===
Monday, October 12, 2015 at Sapporo Dome in Sapporo, Hokkaido
Team	1	2	3	4	5	6	7	8	9	R	H	E
Lotte	0	1	0	0	0	0	1	0	0	2	5	0
Nippon-Ham	1	0	0	0	0	0	0	0	0	1	10	0
WP: Hideaki Wakui (1–0) LP: Kohei Arihara (1–1) Sv: Tatsuya Uchi (1); Home runs: LOT: Tadahito Iguchi (1), Alfredo Despaigne (1); NIP: None

== Final stage ==
=== Summary ===
Fukuoka SoftBank Hawks won the series, 4–0*.

Game	Date	Score	Location	Time	Attendance
1	October 14	Chiba Lotte Marines – 2, Fukuoka SoftBank Hawks – 3 (10)	Yafuoku Dome	3:43	37,360
2	October 15	Chiba Lotte Marines – 1, Fukuoka SoftBank Hawks – 6	Yafuoku Dome	2:59	37,603
3	October 16	Chiba Lotte Marines – 1, Fukuoka SoftBank Hawks – 3	Yafuoku Dome	2:53	37,235

* The Pacific League regular season champion is given a one-game advantage in the Final Stage.

=== Game 1 ===
Wednesday, October 14, 2015 at Fukuoka Yahuoku! Dome in Fukuoka, Fukuoka Prefecture
Team	1	2	3	4	5	6	7	8	9	10	R	H	E
Lotte	0	0	2	0	0	0	0	0	0	0	2	7	0
SoftBank	0	0	2	0	0	0	0	0	0	1X	3	9	0
WP: Ryota Igarashi (1–0) LP: Tatsuya Uchi (0–1); Home runs: LOT: None; SOF: Yuki Yanagita (1)

=== Game 2 ===
Thursday, October 15, 2015 at Fukuoka Yahuoku! Dome in Fukuoka, Fukuoka Prefecture
Team	1	2	3	4	5	6	7	8	9	R	H	E
Lotte	0	0	0	1	0	0	0	0	0	1	5	0
SoftBank	0	1	0	0	0	5	0	0	X	6	9	0
WP: Rick van den Hurk (1–0) LP: Takuya Furuya (0–1); Home runs: LOT: None; SOF: Dae-ho Lee (1)

=== Game 3 ===
Friday, October 16, 2015 at Fukuoka Yahuoku! Dome in Fukuoka, Fukuoka Prefecture
Team	1	2	3	4	5	6	7	8	9	R	H	E
Lotte	0	0	0	0	1	0	0	0	0	1	4	0
SoftBank	0	0	3	0	0	0	0	0	X	3	8	0
WP: Kenichi Nakata (1–0) LP: Ayumu Ishikawa (0–1) Sv: Dennis Sarfate (1); Home runs: LOT: None; SOF: Dae-ho Lee (2)
