= Masahide Kobayashi =

Japanese baseball player (born 1974)

Masa Kobayashi
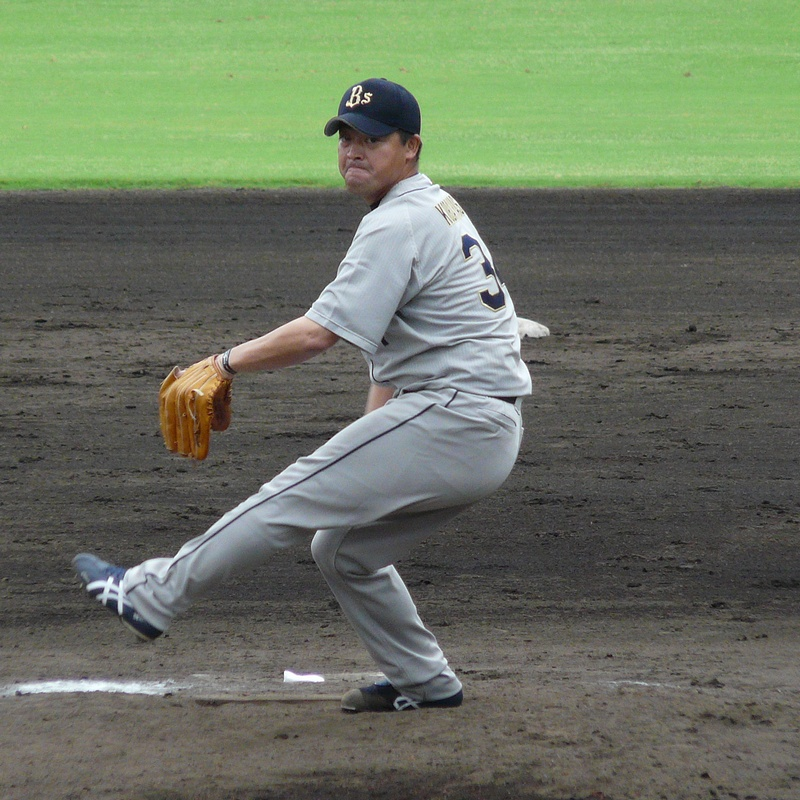
- Kobayashi with the Orix Buffaloes
- Relief pitcher / Pitching coach
- Born: May 24, 1974 (age 51); Ōtsuki, Japan
- Batted: Right Threw: Right

Professional debut
- NPB: April 7, 1999, for the Chiba Lotte Marines
- MLB: April 2, 2008, for the Cleveland Indians

Last appearance
- MLB: May 7, 2009, for the Cleveland Indians
- NPB: April 30, 2011, for the Orix Buffaloes

NPB statistics
- Win–loss record: 36–34
- Earned run average: 2.93
- Saves: 228

MLB statistics
- Win–loss record: 4–5
- Earned run average: 5.10
- Saves: 6
- Stats at Baseball Reference

Teams
- As player: Chiba Lotte Marines (1997–2007); Cleveland Indians (2008–2009); Yomiuri Giants (2010); Orix Buffaloes (2011); As coach: Orix Buffaloes (2012–2014); Chiba Lotte Marines (2015–2018)

Career highlights and awards
- 1x Japan Series champion (2005); 4× NPB All-Star (2000, 2001, 2005, 2006)

Masahide Kobayashi
Medal record

Men's baseball

Representing Japan

Olympic Games
Bronze medal – third place	Athens 2004	Team competition

Masahide "Masa" Kobayashi (小林 雅英, Kobayashi Masahide; born May 24, 1974 in Ōtsuki, Yamanashi, Japan) is a former professional baseball pitcher and pitching coach.

From 1997 to 2007, Kobayashi played in the Nippon Professional Baseball league for the Chiba Lotte Marines. From 2008 to 2009, he played for Major League Baseball's Cleveland Indians. He was a member of the Japanese Olympic baseball team for the 2004 Summer Olympics and won a bronze medal.

Kobayashi led the Pacific League in saves in 2005, with 29. He earned his 200th career save in 2006, becoming the third player in Japanese baseball to reach the mark, after Kazuhiro Sasaki and Shingo Takatsu. In 2007, his final season with the Marines, Kobayashi finished 2–7 with 27 saves and a 3.61 ERA in 49 relief appearances. He became the only Japanese professional pitcher to record 20 or more saves seven straight years.

On November 2, 2007, Kobayashi declared free agency and expressed his interest in playing for a major league club for the 2008 season. On November 20, Kobayashi signed a two-year, $6.25 million deal with the Cleveland Indians. The deal included a $3.25 million club option for a third year.

During the 2008 season, Kobayashi had an average season, going 4–5 with six saves and a 4.53 ERA in 57 relief appearances. He had a 3.05 ERA in the first half, but regressed in the second half, posting a 10.32 ERA in 15 games after the All-Star break.

In 2009, Kobayashi made 10 appearances (9 2/3 innings) with no decisions or saves, and an ERA of 8.38. On May 16, he was removed from Cleveland's 40-man roster. He later cleared waivers and accepted an assignment to the Triple-A Columbus Clippers. He was released on July 18, 2009.

Kobayashi signed a one-year contract with the Yomiuri Giants for the 2009 season. He made 16 appearances with the Giants, posting a 2.25 ERA. He later joined the Orix Buffaloes for the 2011 season.
