= Masaaki Kitaru =

Japanese baseball player (born 1943)

- Pitcher
- Born: June 13, 1943 (age 82); Chōshi, Chiba, Japan
- Batted: Right Threw: Right

debut
- June 26th, 1966, for the Tokyo Orions

Last appearance
- August 14th, 1976, for the Lotte Orions

Teams
- As player: Tokyo Orions/Lotte Orions (1966–1976); As manager: Lotte Orions (1983–1990); Yomiuri Giants (2007)

Masaaki Kitaru (木樽 正明, Kitaru Masaaki) is a former Japanese professional baseball player.

== Career ==
He was born in Chōshi, Chiba, Japan, and graduated from Choshi Commercial High School in 1965. He started his professional career with the Lotte Orions in 1966. As a pitcher, he won 112 games in his professional career. He retired in 1976. He received the Most Valuable Player in the Pacific League award in 1970. He topped the league in wins in 1969 and in ERA in 1971.
