= Kei Hosoya =

Japanese baseball player (born 1988)

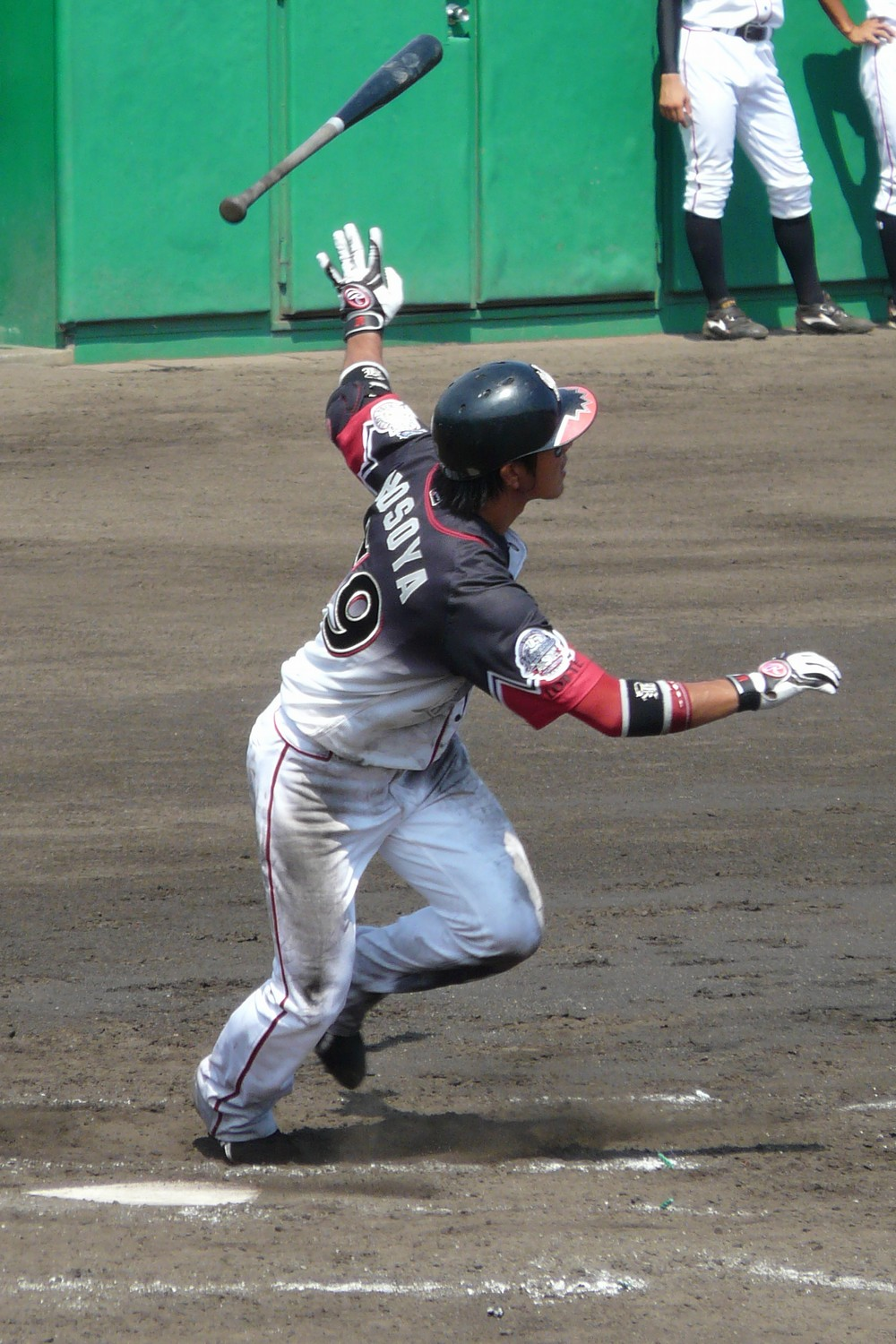
- Hosoya with the Chiba Lotte Marines

Chiba Lotte Marines – No. 82
- Infielder / Coach
- Born: January 17, 1988 (age 38); Isesaki, Gunma, Japan
- Batted: Right Threw: Right

NPB debut
- April 13, 2008, for the Chiba Lotte Marines

Last NPB appearance
- October 11, 2020, for the Chiba Lotte Marines

NPB statistics
- Batting average: .228
- Home runs: 10
- RBI: 80
- Stats at Baseball Reference

Teams
- As player: Chiba Lotte Marines (2006–2020); As coach: Toyama GRN Thunderbirds (2021–2024); Chiba Lotte Marines (2025–present)

Kei Hosoya (細谷 圭, born January 17, 1988) is a Japanese former professional baseball infielder who is currently a coach for the Toyama GRN Thunderbirds of Baseball Challenge League. He played in his entire career in Nippon Professional Baseball (NPB) for the Chiba Lotte Marines.

== Career ==
=== Playing career ===
Chiba Lotte Marines selected Hosoya with the forth selection in the 2005 NPB draft.

On April 13, 2008, Hosoya made his NPB debut.

On December 2, 2020, Hosoya become a free agent. On December 26, 2020, Hosoya announced his retirement.

=== Coaching career ===
On December 26, 2020, Hosoya announced his retirement and also become coach for the Toyama GRN Thunderbirds of Baseball Challenge League.
