= 2005 Japan Series =

Team (Wins)	Managers	Season
Chiba Lotte Marines (4)	Bobby Valentine	84–49–3. 84–49–3 (.632), 4½ GB
Hanshin Tigers (0)	Akinobu Okada	87–54–5. 87–54–5 (.617), 10 GA
- Dates: October 22–26
- MVP: Toshiaki Imae (Lotte)
- FSA: Akihiro Yano (Hanshin)

Broadcast
- Television: TV Asahi (Game 1, ANN); TV Tokyo (Game 2, TXN and others); ABC (Game 3, ANN); MBS (Game 4, JNN)

The 2005 Japan Series was the championship series of Nippon Professional Baseball (NPB) for the 2005 season. The 56th edition of the Series, it was a best-of-seven playoff matched the Central League champion Hanshin Tigers against the Pacific League champion Chiba Lotte Marines. It would become the most one-sided Japan Series in history, as the Marines outscored the Tigers 33-4 throughout the series. On the other hand, the Tigers had several worst records in the Japan Series, scoring only 4 runs, an earned run average of 8.63, and getting no home runs. Their offense was also only limited to 2 extra base hits; a pair of doubles from Andy Sheets and Takashi Toritani.

== Background ==
=== Chiba Lotte Marines ===
The Marines, led by charismatic manager Bobby Valentine, pulled off an incredible season, finishing 2nd in the Pacific League, qualifying for the newly created Pacific League Climax Series. They defeated the defending Japan Series champion Seibu Lions, then squeaked by the Fukuoka SoftBank Hawks, 3 games to 2, in a series where they were just one out away from sweeping the heavily favored Hawks. The previous year, the Hawks and Marines were set to merge, alongside the ongoing merger with the Osaka Kintetsu Buffaloes and Orix BlueWave, whilst also proposing to merge both Central and Pacific League to a unified league structure, similar to the KBO and CPBL. However, once it was clear that a unified league structure was heavily opposed, the Hawks-Marines merger never came through, and SoftBank ended up buying the Hawks off the financially struggling Daiei.

Naoyuki Shimizu and submariner Shunsuke Watanabe led the Marines pitching staff, one that allowed the fewest runs in Nippon Professional Baseball. Masahide Kobayashi was the team's closer, although he did blow his fair share of saves over the season. Watanabe, Shingo Ono, and Dan Serafini all put up an ERA under 3, the lowest by any Marines pitcher since Nate Minchey put up a 2.85 ERA in 2002.

The Marines offense scored the most runs in the league with a hard-hitting lineup featuring Benny Agbayani, Tsuyoshi Nishioka, Toshiaki Imae, and star Korean import Lee Seung-Yeop, who led the team in home runs. Other supporting guys balancing their offense included Tomoya Satozaki, Koichi Hori, Matt Franco, and Saburo Omura.

=== Hanshin Tigers ===
The Tigers were two years removed from their last Japan Series appearance, when they were defeated in 7 games by the then-Fukuoka Daiei Hawks in 2003. The team from that year was largely the same, but also featured some new faces. One of which was a managerial change, as after then-manager Senichi Hoshino stepped down due to health problems, former Tiger and 1985 Japan Series champion Akinobu Okada was called to fill his spot as manager.

The Tigers' pitching staff was headlined by the trio called JFK, short for setup men Jeff Williams, Kyuji Fujikawa, and closer Tomoyuki Kubota. The team's #1 starter was Yuya Andoh, who had a fine season himself in 2005, and the same was for Tsuyoshi Shimoyanagi. Other faces of their staff included Kei Igawa, Shinobu Fukuhara, and Naohisa Sugiyama.

The Tigers' offense was buoyed by league MVP Tomoaki Kanemoto, who hit four home runs in the 2003 Series. Catcher Akihiro Yano was also an integral part of the team's power. The Tigers also had speed to burn in shortstop Takashi Toritani and center fielder Norihiro Akahoshi. Makoto Imaoka also had a dominant year, driving 147 runs in, the most in a single season in Tigers franchise history. After losing George Arias in an attempt to get then Yokohama BayStars star foreigner Tyrone Woods (only for Woods to sign with the Chunichi Dragons), the Tigers managed to fill the gap missing by Arias by luring Hiroshima Toyo Carp shortstop Andy Sheets. Unlike the balanced offence the Marines ran, the Tigers' offense had more damage potential, but was easier to stop.

=== Pacific League Playoff ===
The Marines finished second to the Fukuoka SoftBank Hawks in the Pacific League in 2005, giving them home-field advantage in the playoffs for the first round against the defending Japan Series Champion Seibu Lions. The Marines swept the Lions and then got into a dramatic five-game series with the favored Hawks.

Despite being one out away from sweeping the Hawks, closer Kobayashi coughed up a 4–0 lead in Game 3 of the best-of-five series. SoftBank would win Game 3 in extra innings, and then also won Game 4. However, the Marines won Game 5 on a clutch double from Tomoya Satozaki.

== Summary ==
PL Chiba Lotte Marines (4) vs. CL Hanshin Tigers (0)

Game	Date	Score	Location	Time	Attendance
1	October 22	Hanshin Tigers – 1, Chiba Lotte Marines – 10 (7 innings)	Chiba Marine Stadium	2:14	28,333
2	October 23	Hanshin Tigers – 0, Chiba Lotte Marines – 10	Chiba Marine Stadium	2:32	28,354
3	October 25	Chiba Lotte Marines – 10, Hanshin Tigers – 1	Hanshin Koshien Stadium	3:20	47,753
4	October 26	Chiba Lotte Marines – 3, Hanshin Tigers – 2	Hanshin Koshien Stadium	3:21	47,810

== Game summaries ==
=== Game 1 ===
Saturday, October 22, 2005 6:17 pm (JST) at Chiba Marine Stadium in Chiba City, Chiba Prefecture
Team	1	2	3	4	5	6	7	R	H	E
Hanshin	0	0	0	0	1	0	0	1	5	0
Lotte	1	0	0	0	3	1	5x	10	15	0
Starting pitchers: HAN: Kei Igawa (0–0); LOT: Naoyuki Shimizu (0–0); WP: Naoyuki Shimizu (1–0) LP: Kei Igawa (0–1); Home runs: HAN: none LOT: Toshiaki Imae (1), Lee Seung-Yeop (1), Tomoya Satozaki (1), Benny Agbayani (1); Attendance: 28,333; Notes: The Marines won after the game was called off during the bottom of the 7th inning with 1 out.

The first game would set the tone for the rest of the series for both teams. The Marines sent 10-game winner Nao Shimizu to the mound against Tigers ace Kei Igawa, who won 13 games in 2005.

The Tigers threatened in the first with two on and one out, but Shimizu managed to get Kanemoto to ground into an inning-ending double play, started by shortstop Nishioka. This would be the first of seemingly endless rally-killing double plays for the Tigers in the Series. In the bottom of the inning, Imae would set his own pace for the series with a towering home run to left field to put the Marines up 1–0.

The teams matched zeroes until the 5th, when Makoto Imaoka singled and Yano doubled, sending Imaoka to 3rd. Atsushi Fujimoto then lifted a sacrifice fly to left that scored Imaoka on a close play.

Shades of the 2003 Japan Series opener were in the public's mind, however it all started to fall apart for the Tigers in the 5th. A single and a beautifully executed push bunt by Nishioka led to an RBI single by Imae. With a run already in, normally light-hitting Saburo Ohmura doubled in both Nishioka and Imae to put Lotte ahead 4–1.

In the 6th inning, Seung-Yeop Lee crushed a belt-high Igawa pitch into the right-field stands for a home run to make it 5–1. With the fog rolling into Chiba Marine Stadium, the Marines turned an already one-sided affair into a whitewashing. Two singles set up catcher Tomoya Satozaki for a 3-run home run. Agbayani capped the scoring in the 7th through even thicker fog with a 2-run blast of his own for the Marines' 4th home run of the day and staking the team to a 10–1 lead.

After Agbayani's home run, the umpires conferred and called for a fog delay. After a wait, the umpires decided to call the game after 7 innings, giving Shimizu a complete game victory.

=== Game 2 ===
Sunday, October 23, 2005 6:16 pm (JST) at Chiba Marine Stadium in Chiba City, Chiba Prefecture
Team	1	2	3	4	5	6	7	8	9	R	H	E
Hanshin	0	0	0	0	0	0	0	0	0	0	4	1
Lotte	1	1	0	0	0	5	0	3	X	10	12	0
Starting pitchers: HAN: Yuya Andoh (0–0); LOT: Shunsuke Watanabe (0–0); WP: Shunsuke Watanabe (1–0) LP: Yuya Andoh (0–1); Home runs: HAN: none LOT: Saburo Ohmura (1), Matt Franco (1), Lee Seung-Yeop (2); Attendance: 28,354

Looking to rebound from the previous night's thumping, the Tigers sent Yuya Andoh to the mound, countering the Marines' star submarine pitcher, Shunsuke Watanabe. Again, the Marines got off to a fast start, with Nishioka doubling to right on the second pitch he saw from Andoh. With 2 down and Nishioka on 3rd, Saburo hit a ground ball to Imaoka at 3rd, but the throw was one-hopped to the first baseman Andy Sheets and got away from him. Saburo reached and Nishioka scored to put the Marines on top, 1–0.

In the 2nd inning, Lee drew a walk, setting up Imae, who hit a double and advanced the Korean slugger to 3rd. A double play followed, but the Tigers were willing to trade a run for 2 outs, as Lee scored.

Watanabe had little resistance in the first two innings, but ran into a bit of trouble in the 3rd. Two singles leading off the inning brought up Fujimoto, who tried to sacrifice the runners to 2nd and 3rd, but a bad bunt with one strike put the pressure on Fujimoto to swing away. He ended up fouling out to Lee at first, and Hanshin would fail to score after the next two batters failed to reach as well.

The Tigers would threaten again in the top of the 6th, when Akahoshi singled and stole second to start the inning. Toritani then singled himself to put runners on the corners with nobody out. However, after an out, Sheets lined a Watanabe pitch up the middle which was fielded for a 4–6–3 double play, Hanshin's 2nd twin-killing of the game.

With the Tigers failing to at least pull closer, the Marines then went in for the kill. With a runner on first and one out, Saburo lined a home run to left field to put Lotte ahead 4–0. Matt Franco then immediately followed with a home run of his own for a 5–0 Marines lead. Andoh was visibly in tears as he pitched to Agbayani. Egusa was brought in to face the dangerous Lee, who clubbed the 3rd home run of the inning to put the game away at 7–0.

In the 8th, Lotte added two more, one of the runs coming off the bat of Imae once again. Through two games, Imae was a perfect 8-for-8 with one home run. Lotte had taken an overwhelming 9–0 lead, but they weren't done yet. Platoon catcher Tasuku Hashimoto then followed Imae with a triple that gave the Marines a 10–0 lead.

Watanabe closed out the game with little resistance from the Tigers' batters, giving the Marines a commanding 2 games to none lead in the series. The Tigers had been in this exact situation before two years earlier, and came within one game of winning the Japan Series then. Going home to the friendly confines of Koshien Stadium, could they turn the series around?

=== Game 3 ===
Tuesday, October 25, 2005 6:16 pm (JST) at Hanshin Koshien Stadium in Nishinomiya, Hyōgo Prefecture
Team	1	2	3	4	5	6	7	8	9	R	H	E
Lotte	0	1	0	2	0	0	7	0	0	10	10	0
Hanshin	0	1	0	0	0	0	0	0	0	1	6	1
Starting pitchers: LOT: Hiroyuki Kobayashi (0–0); HAN: Tsuyoshi Shimoyanagi (0–0); WP: Hiroyuki Kobayashi (1–0) LP: Tsuyoshi Shimoyanagi (0–1); Home runs: LOT: Kazuya Fukuura (1); HAN: none Attendance: 47,753

Having been outscored 20–1 in the first two games, the Tigers were not only in need of a win, but also of a way to somehow stop (or at least slow down) the dominant Lotte lineup. Things bode well for the Tigers, however, as they headed home to Koshien Stadium, where they had reeled off three straight wins in the 2003 Japan Series against the Hawks.

Tsuyoshi Shimoyanagi took the hill for the Tigers and had a clean first inning. Big right-hander Hiroyuki Kobayashi was called on to start for the Marines, and he found trouble with one out in the first as Toritani doubled off the wall in left. However, neither Sheets or Kanemoto could send Toritani home, and the first inning ended scoreless.

Saburo led off the second with a double off Shimoyanagi. After reaching 3rd, Agbayani hit a sacrifice fly to left to score Saburo and give the Marines a 1–0 lead. In the bottom of the 2nd, the Tigers again seemed to have something going as Imaoka singled and Shinjiro Hiyama drew a full count walk with nobody out. After a sacrifice bunt, Imaoka scored on a fielder's choice by Kentaro Sekimoto. This was the first time that Hanshin had scored in 11 innings, and it tied the score, 1–1.

Pesky as ever, the Marines answered right back against Shimoyanagi in the top of the 4th. Hori and Kazuya Fukuura both singled to start the inning. After an out and a walk, the bases were loaded with 1 down for Satozaki, who hit a slow roller to short. It was fielded by Toritani at short who tossed it to Sekimoto at 2nd for one out, but Sekimoto's relay to Sheets at first was apparently too late to get Satozaki at 1st, allowing Hori to score and give the Marines the 2–1 lead. However, replays showed that Satozaki was out by the smallest of margins. With runners on the corners and 2 out, Imae came up and again knocked in a run, this time on a swinging bunt which was fielded, but too late to get Imae at first, which allowed Fukuura to score from 3rd, giving the Marines a 3–1 lead.

Keeping with the theme of the past two games, the Tigers kept it close, but failed to score to tie the game up. In the 7th, the Marines kept their own theme going by breaking the game open in the late innings. Young reliever Kyuji Fujikawa worked a clean 6th, but Satozaki walked and once again Imae came through with a double to right-center to put runners on 2nd and 3rd with nobody out to start the 7th. Matt Franco then drew a full-count walk to load the bases with nobody out. The walks came back to bite Fujikawa. Hashimoto rifled a single up the middle to score both Satozaki and Imae and give the Marines a 5–1 lead. Nishioka then came up and singled up the middle to put Lotte ahead 6–-1. After re-loading the bases, Fukuura then put the nail in the coffin by crushing a grand slam to extend the Marines' lead to 10–1.

That would be how the game would end, as Soichi Fujita worked the 8th, striking out a visibly frustrated Sheets to end the inning. Yasuhiko Yabuta then worked the 9th and struck out Kanemoto and Hiyama to end the game and give the Marines a commanding 3 games-to-none lead.

=== Game 4 ===
Wednesday, October 26, 2005 6:15 pm (JST) at Hanshin Koshien Stadium in Nishinomiya, Hyōgo Prefecture
Team	1	2	3	4	5	6	7	8	9	R	H	E
Lotte	0	2	1	0	0	0	0	0	0	3	7	0
Hanshin	0	0	0	0	0	2	0	0	0	2	7	0
Starting pitchers: LOT: Dan Serafini (0–0); HAN: Naohisa Sugiyama (0–0); WP: Dan Serafini (1–0) LP: Naohisa Sugiyama (0–1) Sv: Masahide Kobayashi (1); Home runs: LOT: Lee Seung-Yeop (3); HAN: none Attendance: 47,810

The only close game of the series ended Hanshin's hopes of winning their first Japan Series championship since 1985. Naohisa Sugiyama took the mound for the Tigers to try to stage a miracle comeback. Considering the Tigers had been outscored 30–2 in the first three games, a miracle was what they would need. On the other side was foreign lefty Dan Serafini. Serafini got into some trouble in the first with Akahoshi beating out a high chopper to short and Toritani laying down a bunt, then beating Serafini's throw to first. However, the Tigers once again could not capitalize and take their first lead of the series, with the next three batters in Andy Sheets, Tomoaki Kanemoto, and Makoto Imaoka all failing to drive in runs.

Sugiyama could not duplicate the success of the previous inning, as Matt Franco led off with a double, and then Lee Seung-Yeop crushed his 3rd home run of the series to deep right field, putting the Marines on top, 2–0.

In the home half of the 3rd, Akahoshi once again reached and was sacrificed to second, and for a moment it seemed that the Tigers would finally catch a break, but Sheets' liner was caught by a great effort from Franco to end the inning and keep the Tigers off the board.

Franco and Lee teamed up again to lead off the 3rd inning with Franco drawing a walk and then Lee doubling, driving Franco in all the way from first. The 3–0 lead seemed safe, especially given the Tigers' late-inning collapses.

In the 5th, Serafini found himself in trouble yet again, as he had runners on first and 2nd with nobody out. But once again, the Tigers could not score, as Serafini got a strikeout, then induced a 4-6-3 double play on Akahoshi.

However, in the 6th the Tigers finally made the most of one of their chances. Serafini gave up a single to Sheets and then walked Kanemoto with one out. Valentine went to his bullpen, sending Shingo Ono to the mound to try to stem the tide. Ono gave up a bloop single to Imaoka that scored Sheets to put the Tigers on the board at 3–1. Shinjiro Hiyama then kept the rally going by singling just past second to pull the Tigers ever closer at 3–2. In just one inning, the Tigers had matched their offensive output over three games. Akihiro Yano came up with a chance to keep it going, but he grounded into yet another inning-ending double play for the Tigers.

From there, the last three innings were a battle of the bullpens. Both teams fired scoreless 7th innings, and with one on and one out in the 8th, Yabuta struck out both Kanemoto and Imaoka to end the inning. Masahide Kobayashi came in to end the series, his first appearance in the series. It did not start well, as Kobayashi issued a four-pitch walk to Hiyama to start the inning. Yano tried to sacrifice Hiyama to 2nd, but his sacrifice bunt attempt was popped up and caught by Fukuura, and Hiyama was doubled off at 1st for the Tigers' 3rd double play of the game. Kobayashi then got Fujimoto swinging to end the game and the series.

== Aftermath ==
The final aggregate score for the series was 33–4, the most one-sided Japan Series in the event's history. With the win, the Marines won their first Japan Series Championship since 1974, when they were known as the Lotte Orions. In addition, Bobby Valentine was the first foreign manager to win a Japan Series championship.

The series MVP was Toshiaki Imae, who recorded eight straight hits in the first two games, and finished with a .625 average for the series with one home run and nine runs batted in.

== See also ==
- 2005 World Series
