= Eric Hillman =

American baseball player (born 1966)

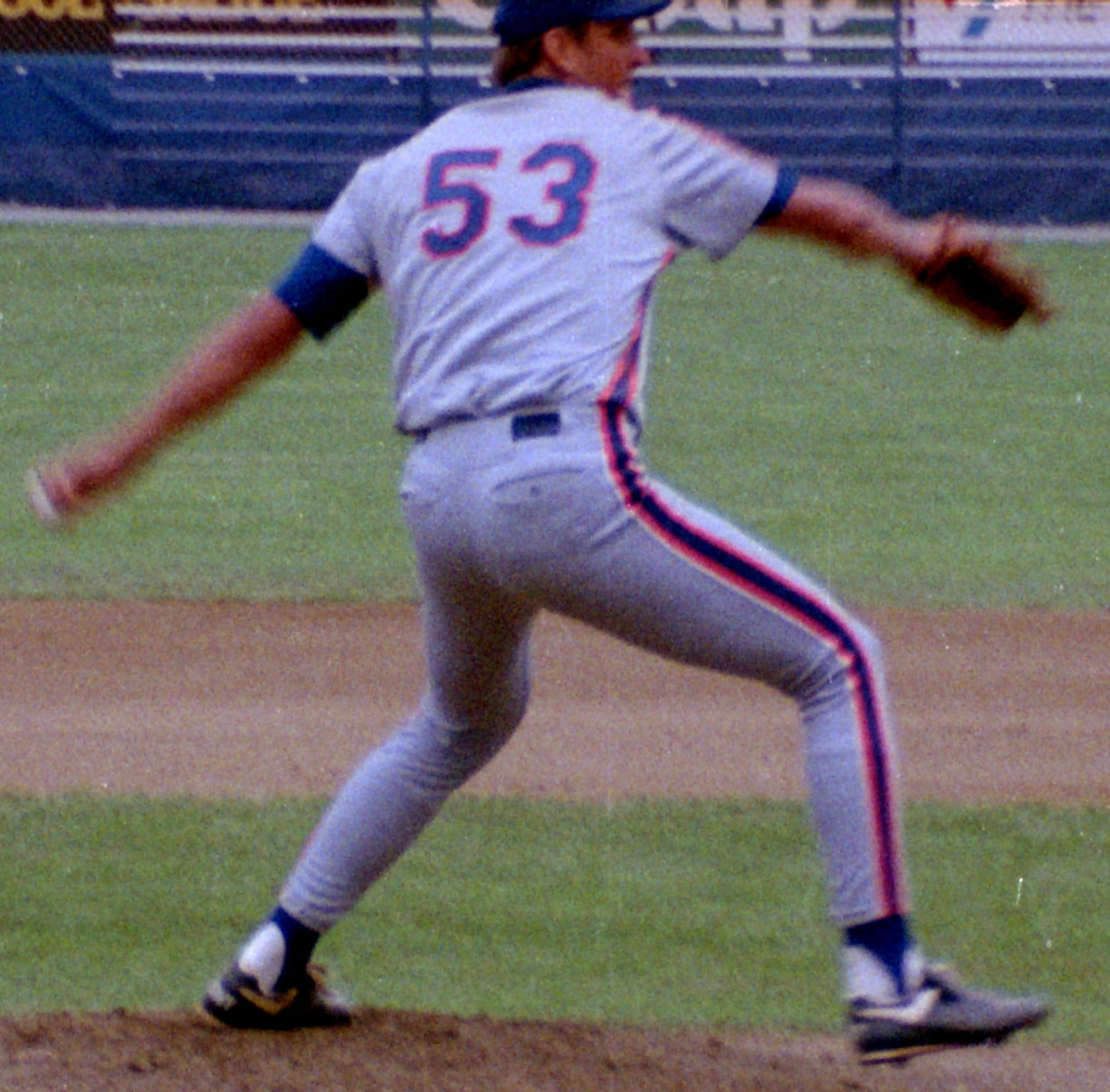
- Hillman with the Tidewater Tides in 1992
- Pitcher
- Born: April 27, 1966 (age 60); Gary, Indiana, U.S.
- Batted: Left Threw: Left

Professional debut
- MLB: May 18, 1992, for the New York Mets
- NPB: April 4, 1995, for the Chiba Lotte Marines

Last appearance
- MLB: May 30, 1994, for the New York Mets
- NPB: May 14, 1997, for the Yomiuri Giants

MLB statistics
- Win–loss record: 4–14
- Earned run average: 4.85
- Strikeouts: 96

NPB statistics
- Win–loss record: 26–19
- Earned run average: 2.64
- Strikeouts: 243
- Stats at Baseball Reference

Teams
- New York Mets (1992–1994); Chiba Lotte Marines (1995–1996); Yomiuri Giants (1997)

John Eric Hillman (born April 27, 1966) is an American former Major League Baseball and Nippon Professional Baseball pitcher.

Hillman played high school ball at Homewood-Flossmoor in suburban Chicago, and then collegiately at Eastern Illinois University. He pitched his entire 3-year MLB career with the New York Mets (1992–1994). After his MLB career, he pitched in NPB from 1995 to 1998 for the Chiba Lotte Marines and the Yomiuri Giants. Hillman was tied with fellow pitcher Randy Johnson for the tallest player in league history at 6 ft 10 in (2.08 m), before later being passed by 6 ft 11 in (2.11 m) Jon Rauch.

Hillman worked as an analyst for FSN Rocky Mountain's coverage of the Colorado Rockies between 2005 and 2008.

== Nippon Professional Baseball career ==
Hillman also played four seasons in Japan. He played first with the Chiba Lotte Marines where Bobby Valentine was manager. In 1995, his first season in Japan, Hillman had 12 wins and 9 losses. In 1996, he logged 14 wins and 9 losses and was voted the best nine. Hillman was also voted MVP of the 1996 All-Star game. In 1997, the Yomiuri Giants purchased his contract, signing him to a two-year deal. The Giants expected him to be a key player in their quest for a championship.

Hillman, however, disappointed as he spent most of the time on the disabled list with shoulder pain. In 1997, he pitched only 6 innings. In 1998, he was still on the disabled list and continued to have severe pain in his throwing shoulder. On June 1, 1998, the Giants released him. After returning to the US, Hillman underwent arthroscopic surgery in July, 1998. Dr. James Andrews performed the surgery and discovered a full thickness tear in the rotator cuff, a diagnosis the Japanese doctors and trainers had missed. Hillman officially retired from baseball on April 19, 2000.
