= Koji Yamamoto (baseball, born 1951) =

Japanese baseball player (1951–2016)

- first baseman
- Born: December 25, 1951; Sakai, Osaka, Japan
- Died: April 23, 2016 (aged 64); Kitakyushu, Fukuoka, Japan
- Batted: Left Threw: Left

NPB statistics (through 1988 season)
- Batting average: .277
- Home runs: 64
- RBI: 369
- Hits: 699
- Stolen base: 13
- Sacrifice bunt: 24
- Stats at Baseball Reference

Teams
- As player: Yomiuri Giants (1976–1983); Lotte Orions (1984–1988); As manager: Chiba Lotte Marines (1999–2003); As coach: Lotte Orions/Chiba Lotte Marines (1988–1998); Yomiuri Giants (2004–2005)

Koji Yamamoto (山本 功児, Yamamoto Koji; December 25, 1951 – April 23, 2016) was a Japanese Nippon Professional Baseball infielder.
