= Koichi Hori =

Japanese baseball player (born 1969)

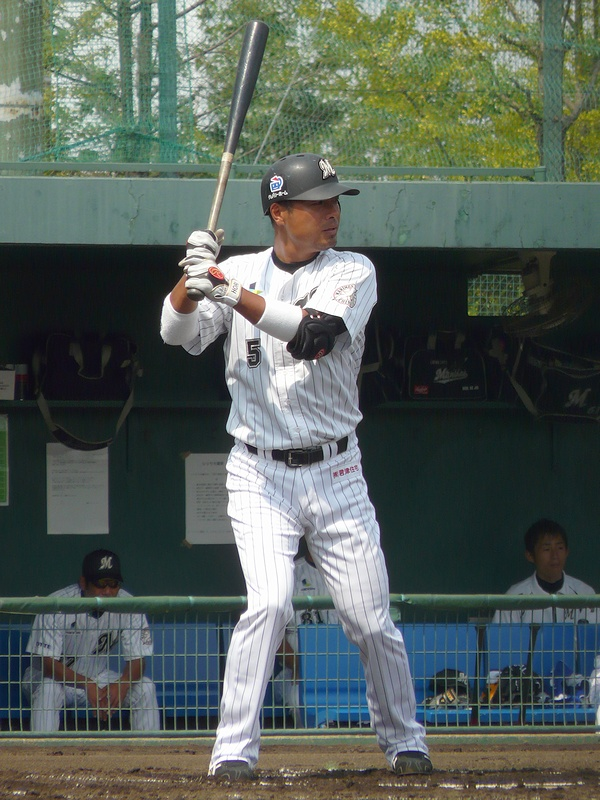

Chiba Lotte Marines – No. 75
- Infielder / Coach
- Born: April 2, 1969 (age 56); Japan
- Batted: Right Threw: Right

NPB debut
- April 9, 1989, for the Lotte Orions

Last NPB appearance
- October 6, 2009, for the Chiba Lotte Marines

NPB statistics (through 2010)
- Batting average: .269
- Home runs: 183
- Hits: 1827

Teams
- As player: Lotte Orions/Chiba Lotte Marines (1988–2010); As coach: Chiba Lotte Marines (2013–present)

Career highlights and awards
- 2× NPB All-Star (1995–1996); 1× Best Nine Award (2005); 2× Japan Series champion (2005), (2010)

Koichi Hori (堀 幸一, born April 2, 1969) is a former Nippon Professional Baseball infielder.
