= Akihiro Yano =

Japanese baseball player (born 1968)

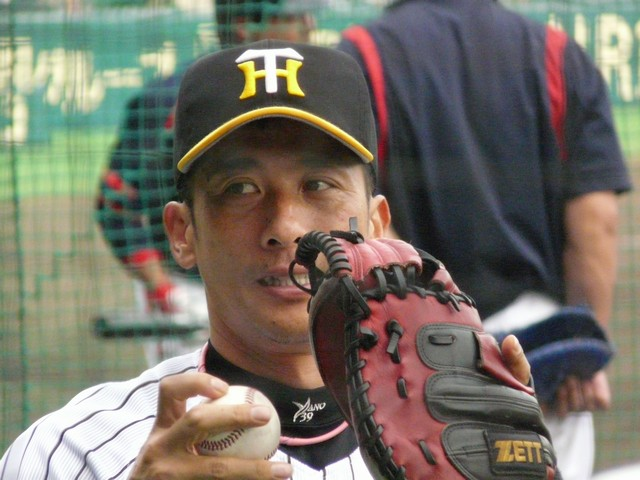
- Catcher / Coach / Manager
- Born: December 6, 1968 (age 57); Hirano-ku, Osaka, Japan
- Batted: Right Threw: Right

NPB debut
- August 3, 1991, for the Chunichi Dragons

Last NPB appearance
- May 8, 2010, for the Hanshin Tigers

NPB statistics
- Batting average: .274
- Hits: 1347
- Home runs: 112
- RBIs: 570
- Stats at Baseball Reference

Teams
- As player: Chunichi Dragons (1991–1997); Hanshin Tigers (1998–2010); As coach: Hanshin Tigers (2016–2018); As manager: Hanshin Tigers (2019–2022)

Career highlights and awards
- 3× Best Nine Award (2003, 2005, 2006); 2× Mitsui Golden Glove Award (2003, 2005); 7× NPB All-Star (1999, 2002–2006, 2008)
Medals
Men's baseball
Representing Japan
Goodwill Games
| Silver medal – second place | 1990 Seattle | Team |
- Last updated on: April 23, 2020

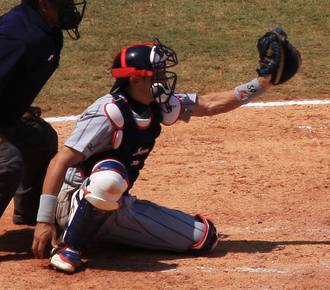
Yano playing for Japan in the 2008 Summer Olympics.

Akihiro Yano (矢野 燿大, Yano Akihiro; real name: 矢野 輝弘, born December 6, 1968) is a former Japanese baseball player in Japan's Nippon Professional Baseball. He started his career as the Number 2 Draft pick with the Chunichi Dragons in 1991, and played for the Hanshin Tigers from 1998 until his retirement in 2010.
