= Shintaro Yoshitake =

Japanese baseball player

- Pitcher
- Born: June 3, 1975; Higashikunisaki District, Ōita, Japan
- Batted: Right Threw: Right

NPB debut
- April 6, 1995, for the Fukuoka Daiei Hawks

Last appearance
- April 4, 2008, for the Yomiuri Giants

NPB statistics (through 2008)
- Win–loss record: 30–41
- Earned run average: 3.81
- Strikeouts: 402
- Saves: 5
- Holds: 52

Teams
- As player: Fukuoka SoftBank Hawks / Fukuoka Daiei Hawks (1994–2006); Yomiuri Giants (2007–2008)

Career highlights and awards
- 1× NPB All-Star (2005)

Shintaro Yoshitake (吉武 真太郎, Yoshitake Shintaro; born June 3, 1975 in Higashikunisaki District, Ōita, Japan) is a Japanese former Nippon Professional Baseball pitcher.
