= Nagoya Stadium =

Baseball stadium in Nagoya, Japan

Coordinates: 35.147354°N 136.88673°E

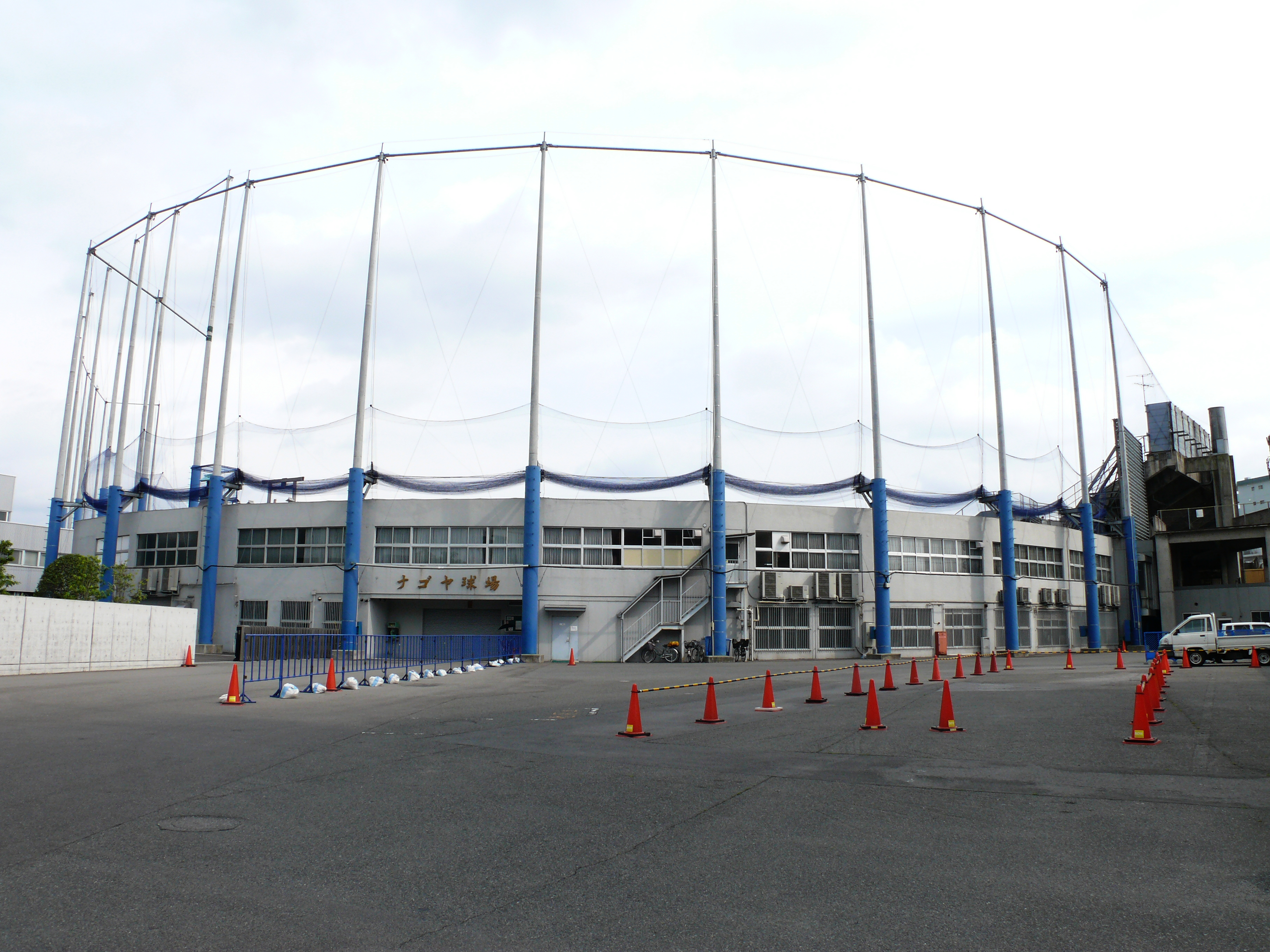
- Interactive map of Nagoya Stadium
- Former names: Chunichi Stadium
- Location: Nagoya, Japan
- Owner: Nagoya Dome Co.
- Operator: Chunichi Dragons
- Capacity: 4,883
- Field size: Left Field - 100 m (328.1 ft); Center Field - 122 m (400.3 ft); Right Field - 100 m (328.1 ft); Height of Outfield Fence - 4.8 m (15.7 ft)

Construction
- Opened: 1948
- Renovated: 2010

Tenant
- Chunichi Dragons (NPB) (1948-1996)

Nagoya Stadium (ナゴヤ球場) is a stadium in Nagoya, Japan. It is primarily used for baseball and was home of the Chunichi Dragons until they moved to the Nagoya Dome in 1997; it remains the main home stadium of the Dragon's minor league team in the Western League. The stadium opened in 1948 and has a capacity of 35,000 people.

Preceded by Korakuen Stadium	Home of the Chunichi Dragons; 1949 – 1996	Succeeded by Nagoya Dome
