= Sumio Hirota =

Japanese baseball player (born 1949)

- Outfielder
- Born: May 13, 1949 (age 77); Sukumo, Kōchi Prefecture, Japan
- Batted: Right Threw: Right

Japan Pacific League debut
- April 8, 1972, for the Lotte Orions

Last Japan Central League appearance
- April 25, 1987, for the Hanshin Tigers

Career statistics
- Batting average: .276
- Home runs: 76
- Runs batted in: 487
- Stolen bases: 294
- Stats at Baseball Reference

Teams
- As player: Lotte Orions (1972–1983); Hanshin Tigers (1984–1987); As manager: Kōchi Fighting Dogs (2014-2015); As coach: Hanshin Tigers (1988-1991); Yokohama Taiyo Whales/Yokohama BayStars (1992-1997); Yomiuri Giants (1998-2001, 2004-2005); Yokohama BayStars (2007-2008); Kōchi Fighting Dogs (2012-2013)

Career highlights and awards
- 1974 Japan Series Most Valuable Player Award

Sumio Hirota (弘田 澄男, Hirota Sumio) (born May 13, 1949 in Sukumo, Kōchi Prefecture, Japan) is a Japanese former professional baseball outfielder. He played with the Lotte Orions from 1972 to 1983 and the Hanshin Tigers from 1984 to 1987. He won the Japan Series Most Valuable Player Award in 1974.
