= Zozo Marine Stadium =

Baseball and rugby union stadium in Chiba, Japan

Coordinates: 35°38′42.86″N 140°1′51.32″E

ZOZO Marine Stadium
- ZOZOマリンスタジアム

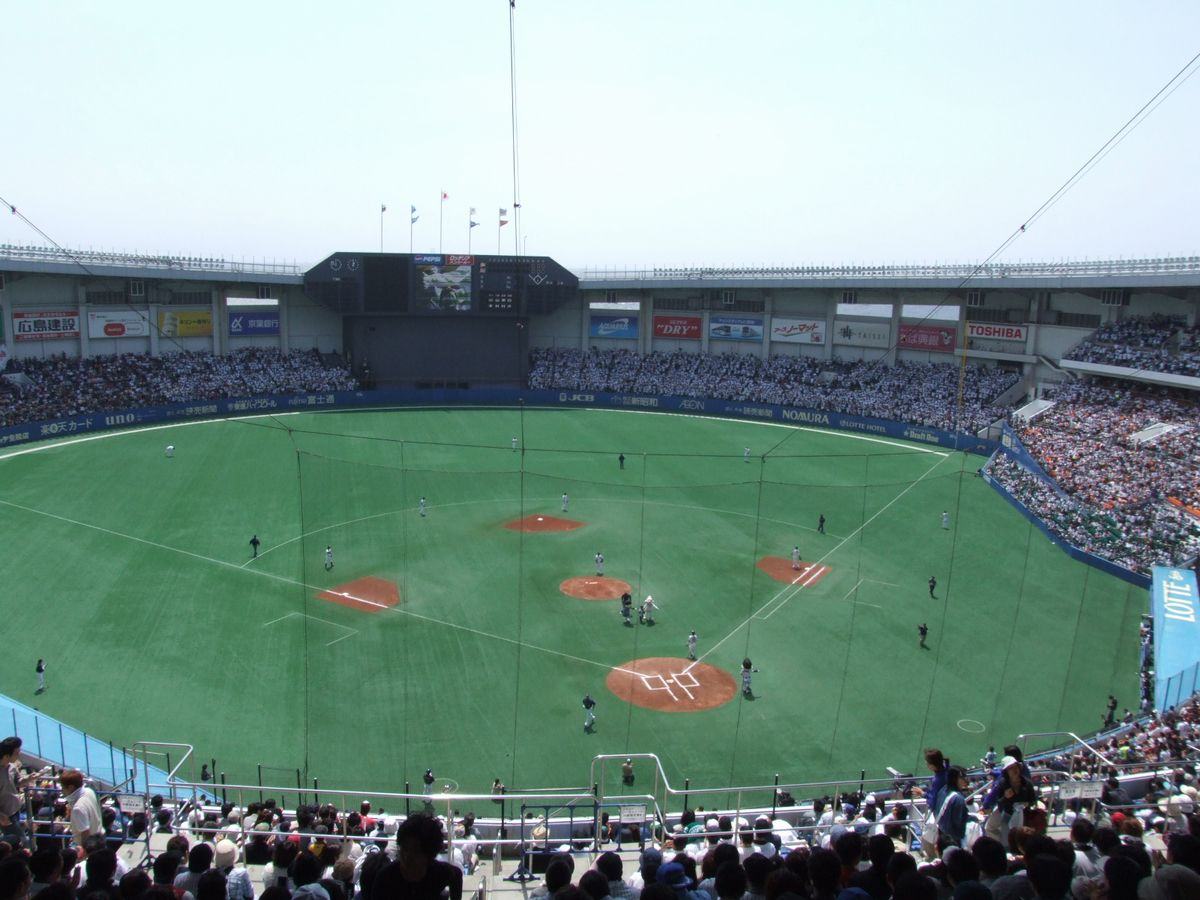
- Interactive map of ZOZO Marine Stadium
- Full name: Chiba Marine Stadium
- Former names: Marine Stadium (1992–2011); QVC Marine Field (2011–2016)
- Location: Mihama, Mihama-ku, Chiba City, Chiba, Japan
- Owner: Chiba City
- Operator: Chiba Lotte Marines
- Capacity: 29,635
- Surface: Astro Nexturf (−2017); MS Craft Baseball Turf (2018–)
- Field size: Left Field – 99.5 m (326.4 ft); Center Field – 122 m (400.3 ft); Right Field – 99.5 m (326.4 ft); Height of Outfield Fence – 3.3 m (14.4 ft)
- Public transit: JR East: Keiyo Line at Kaihimmakuhari

Construction
- Opened: February 2, 1990
- Renovated: 2019, 2023–2024
- Cost: 13,300,000,000 yen

Tenant
- Chiba Lotte Marines (Pacific League) (1992–present)

ZOZO Marine Stadium (ZOZOマリンスタジアム, Zozo Marin Sutajiamu) (official name: Chiba Marine Stadium (千葉マリンスタジアム, Chiba Marin Sutajiamu)) is an outdoor baseball stadium in Chiba City, Chiba, Japan. It opened in 1990, with a capacity of about 30,000 spectators. It is primarily used for baseball games, and is the home field of the Chiba Lotte Marines. It is also used for rugby as well as large-scale music concerts. The stadium was built with a multi-purpose circular shape, similar in shape to some (now-defunct) American stadiums, such as Three Rivers Stadium or Busch Memorial Stadium.

The inaugural event at the Chiba Marine Stadium was on April 13, 1990, with a sold-out performance of the Blond Ambition World Tour by American singer Madonna; the concert was the first of three sold-out dates (April 13–15, 1990) by Madonna at the stadium. In addition to the April 13 concert being the big opening event for the stadium, it was also the first date of Madonna’s tour itself. The April 13 show was marred by heavy rain, thunder, lightning, and high winds, which led to the production being drastically scaled back; this was documented on the tour documentary film, Madonna: Truth or Dare, where it appears the weather did not prevent her audience’s enjoyment that evening. The remaining two shows went-on successfully as scheduled.

Lady Gaga performed two sold-out shows at the venue in August 13 and 14, 2014, for her ArtRave: The Artpop Ball tour.

The stadium hosts the main stage of the Summer Sonic music festival every August, with the other stages of the festival located in nearby Makuhari Messe. The main stage of Electric Daisy Carnival (EDC) Japan has also been held at the stadium, with its first event beginning in 2017.

One of the stadium's most notable baseball events was on April 10, 2022, when Chiba Lotte Marines pitcher Rōki Sasaki threw a perfect game, the 16th perfect game in NPB history. Four more no-hitters, aside from the perfect game, would be thrown that season.

It was announced on May 11, 2025 that the current stadium will be demolished, making way for a new version of the stadium, built in the parking lot of Makuhari Messe. It is scheduled that the design would be revealed in April 2027 and the new stadium would open in 2034.

== Gallery ==
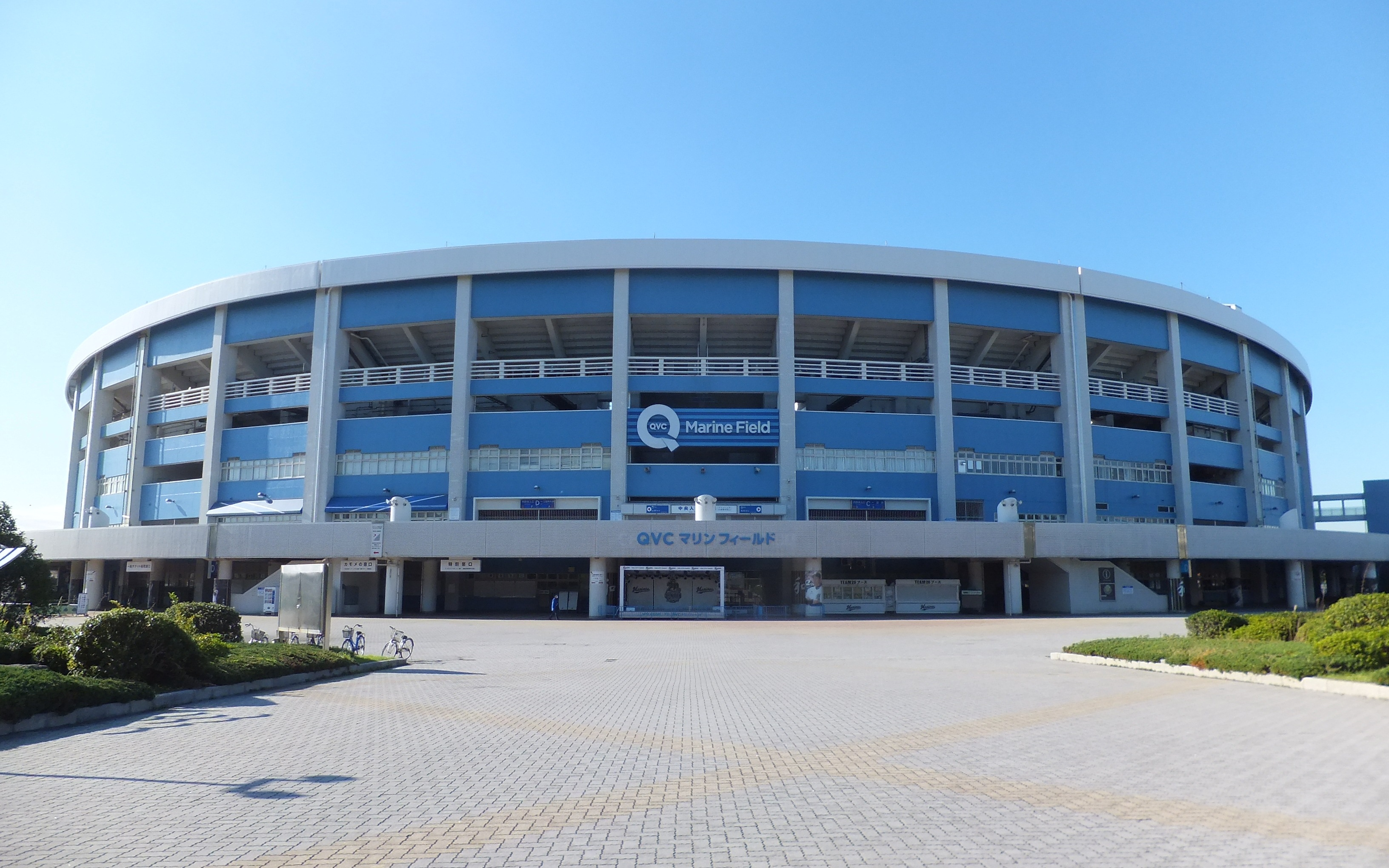
Front of ZOZO Marine Stadium(photo is from QVC Marine Field at that time)

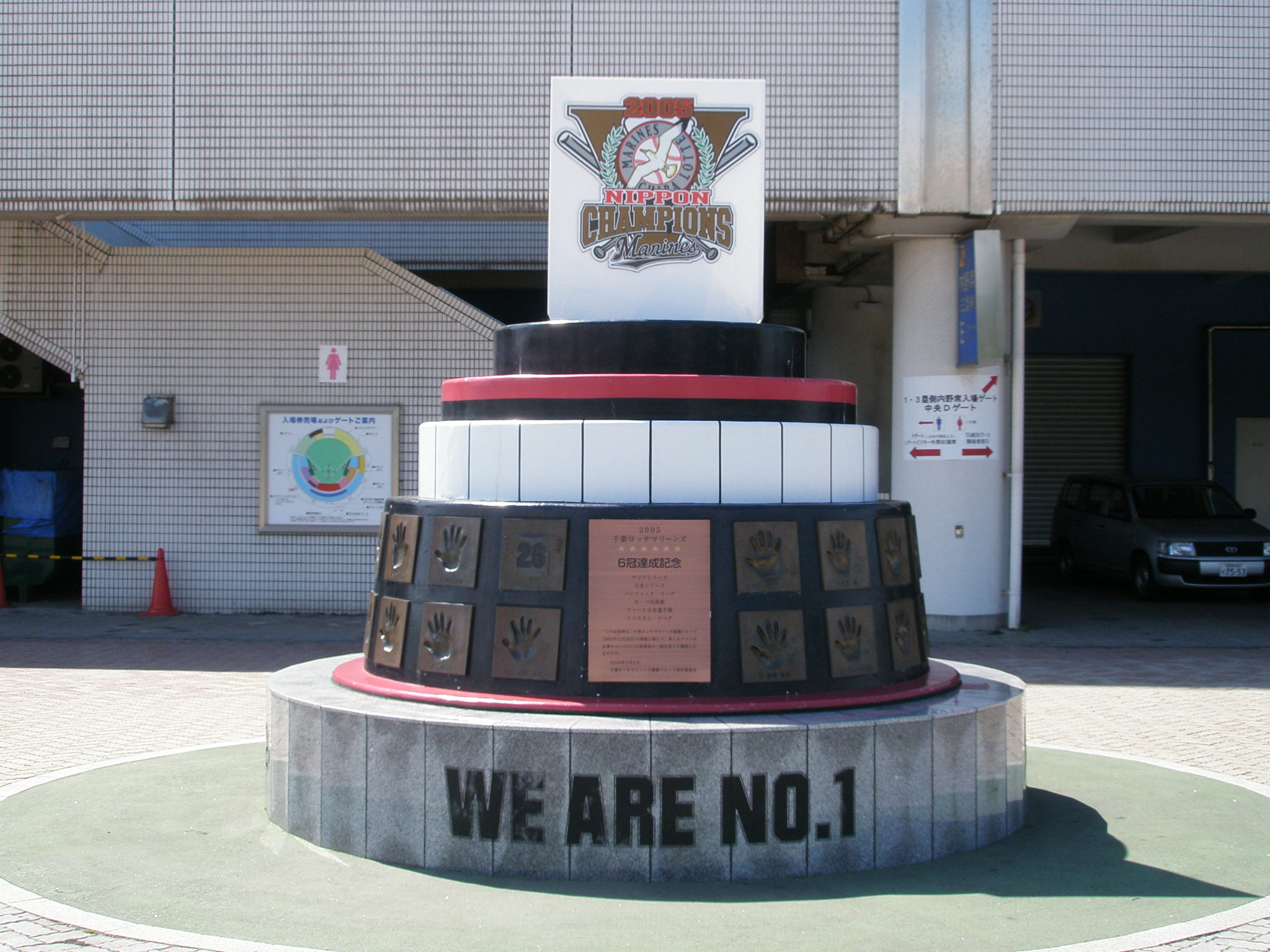
Memorial of Marines, at Chiba Marine Stadium (ZOZO Marine Field)

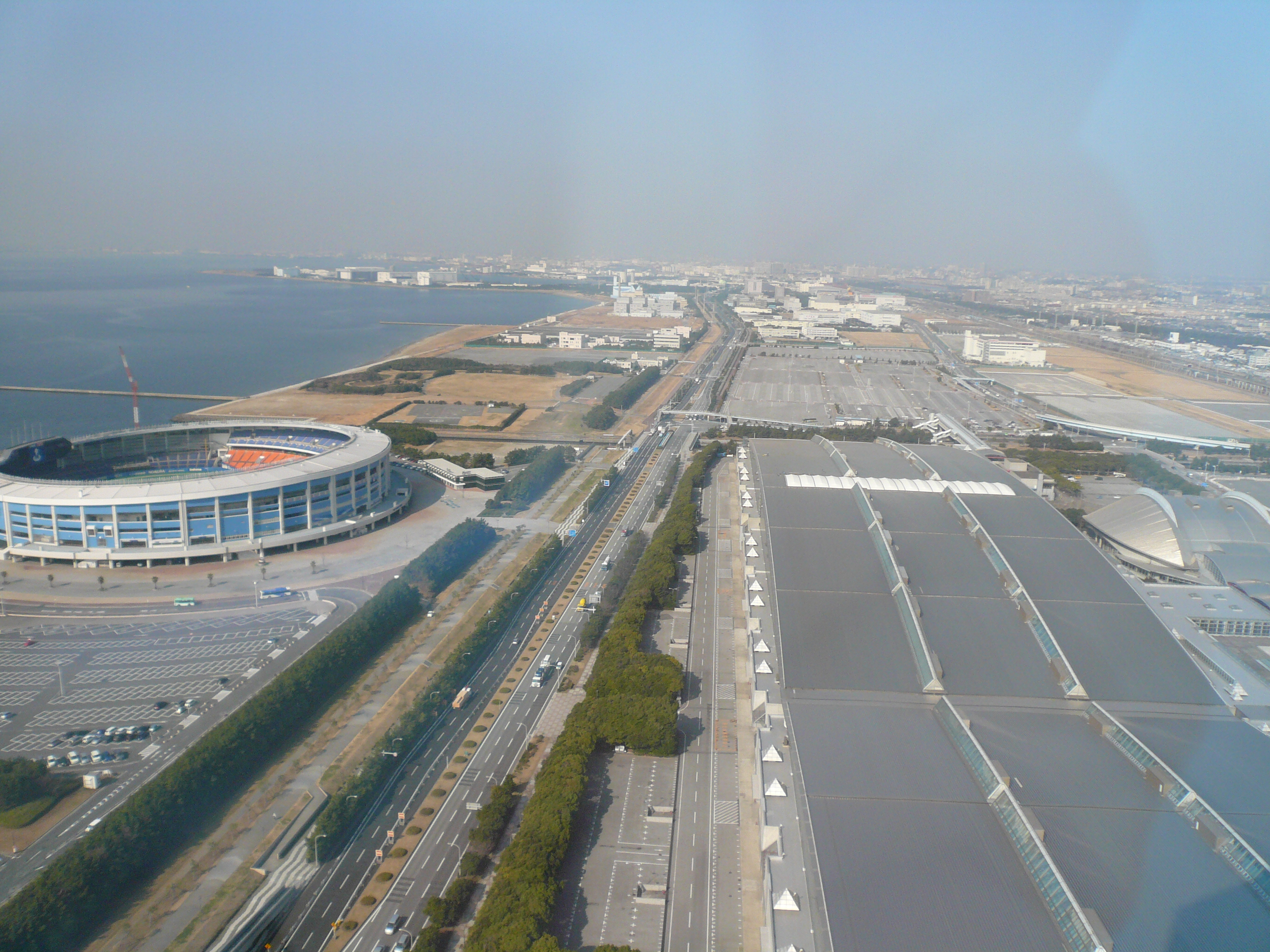
Makuhari Messe (right)

== Trivia ==
- The stadium was modelled as a stage in the 1994 video game Tekken, although it was only known as simply "Stadium".

== Attendances ==
The home attendances of the Chiba Lotte Marines at the ZOZO Marine Stadium:

Season	Games	Total attendance	Average attendance
2025	72	1,873,323	26,018

== See also ==
- Lists of stadiums
- List of stadiums in Japan

Preceded by Kawasaki Stadium	Home of the Chiba Lotte Marines; 1992 –	Succeeded by N/A
