= Chiba Lotte Marines =

Nippon Professional Baseball team in the Pacific League

- 千葉ロッテマリーンズ

Logo	Cap insignia

Information
- League: Nippon Professional Baseball Pacific League (1950–present)
- Location: Mihama-ku, Chiba, Chiba, Japan
- Ballpark: ZOZO Marine Stadium
- Founded: November 26, 1949; 76 years ago
- Nickname(s): Kamome (鴎, seagulls)
- Japan Series championships: 4 (1950, 1974, 2005, 2010)
- PL pennants: 5 (1950, 1960, 1970, 1974, 2005)
- Playoff berths: 14 (1974, 1977, 1980, 1981, 2005, 2007, 2010, 2013, 2015, 2016, 2020, 2021, 2023, 2024)
- Former name: Lotte Orions (1969–1991); Tokyo Orions (1964–1968); Daimai Orions (1958–1963); Mainichi Orions (1950–1957)
- Former ballparks: Kawasaki Stadium (1978–1991); Miyagi Stadium (1973–1977); Tokyo Stadium (1962–1972); Korakuen Stadium (1950–1962)
- Colors: Black, Grey, White
- Mascot: Mar-kun, Rine-chan, and Zu-chan
- Retired numbers: 26
- Ownership: Katsumi Kawai
- Management: Lotte Holdings
- President: Shunsuke Kosaka
- General manager: Naoki Matsumoto
- Manager: Saburo Omura
- Website: https://www.marines.co.jp/

Current uniforms

The Chiba Lotte Marines (千葉ロッテマリーンズ, Chiba Rotte Marīnzu) are a professional baseball team in the Pacific League based in Chiba City, Chiba Prefecture in the Kantō region of Japan and owned by Lotte Holdings Co., Ltd. The Marines were a founding member of the Pacific League in 1950 as the then-known Mainichi Orions when the Japanese Baseball League reorganized into Nippon Professional Baseball, where they won the inaugural 1950 Japan Series. Since 1992, the Marines' home ballpark has been the ZOZO Marine Stadium, located in the Mihama Ward of Chiba, with seats for up to 30,118 people.

The "Marines" name originates from the name of the ballpark, also officially named the Chiba Marine Stadium, because it is located at the seaside. Six players have won the Nippon Professional Baseball Most Valuable Player Award with the team; the last member to win the MVP was in 1985, the longest current drought for all twelve teams.

Through 2026, the franchise's all-time record is 4,993–5,005–411 (.499). The team's current manager is Saburo Omura.

== History ==
The franchise began in 1950 as the Mainichi Orions (毎日オリオンズ, Mainichi Orionzu), an inaugural member of the Pacific League, and were owned by the Mainichi Shimbun newspaper. The Orions were named after the constellation of the same name. The Marines won the inaugural Japan Series in 1950.

In 1958, the team was merged with the Daiei Unions and renamed the Mainichi Daiei Orions (毎日大映オリオンズ, Mainichi Daiei Orionzu), to reflect that both Daiei and Mainichi had a 50% stake in the team, with control being given to Daiei Film president Masaichi Nagata. In 1964 they became the Tokyo Orions (東京オリオンズ, Tokyō Orionzu), and then the Lotte Orions in 1969. The franchise was slow to replicate its initial success: the Orions made the Japan Series in 1960 and 1970, only to lose both years.

The team played in central Tokyo until 1972. From 1973 to 1977 the Lotte Orions (ロッテオリオンズ, Rotte Orionzu) played in the northern Japanese city of Sendai. In 1974, they beat the Chunichi Dragons, becoming the first Pacific League team to win the Series in ten years, as the Yomiuri Giants had claimed the prior nine titles behind the Oh–Nagashima attack. After beating the Dragons, their owners, Lotte Holdings, decided to hold their victory parade in Tokyo, which surprised fans in Sendai. This eventually caused their attendance there to dwindle, going from sold-out games in 1973, to only about 2,000–3,000 attendees for their last few years in Sendai.

In 1977, the Orions signed Major League Baseball player Leron Lee, who ended up playing for the team for eleven seasons, compiling a .320 career batting average and slugging 283 home runs with 912 career RBI. From his retirement to early 2018 (when surpassed by Norichika Aoki), Lee held the Japanese record for career batting average (players with more than 4,000 at bats). In 1978, Lee invited younger brother Leon Lee to play in Japan, and the brothers formed a feared cleanup for the Orions for five seasons — in 1980, Leron had 33 home runs, 90 RBI, and a batting average of .358; while Leon slugged 41 home runs and drove in 116 runs, with a batting average of .340.

In 1978 the team returned to the Tokyo area, settling in the Kawasaki Stadium, at one time home to the Taiyo Whales (now Yokohama DeNA Baystars).

In 1992, the team moved to Chiba City's Chiba Marine Stadium on the eastern shore of Tokyo Bay. They held a fan vote for a new name for the team; the name "Dolphins" won, while another popular choice was "Pirates". However, the name "Dolphins" was thrown out because though an unrelated team named the Nagoya Golden Dolphins (later known as Nagoya Kinko) was long defunct, the letter "D" in broadcasts was already taken by the Dragons; while "Pirates" was disregarded because the Chiba Pirates name was used by a team in a baseball manga. Executives didn't want the team to be associated by a team that they think was supposed to be awful, supported by the fact that by then the Orions had finished their 6th consecutive losing season, finishing in 6th in three of the last four seasons, alongside the fact that they were unsure if they could even use it to begin with, due to Japanese copyright laws. "Marines" was ultimately chosen because the team believed it meant "heroes of the sea" (and because the letter "M" was available), yielding the current club name Chiba Lotte Marines.

Originally, the club used pink, blue, and white on their logo, which included a pirate ship, with a seagull below it, and a wave pattern to reflect the ocean currents off Chiba's coast. In 1995, this was changed to the logo's current design, while dropping pink and blue in favor of red, black and white (with red being dropped in 2019). The current logo's design features a baseball in the background with a seagull soaring, with the club's name around the circle.

The team failed to reach the Japan Series again until 2005. The Marines started the 2005 season in first place behind American manager Bobby Valentine, who had returned after having managed the team to a 2nd place finish in 1995 behind the Orix BlueWave, but struggles between him and general manager Tatsuro Hirooka which had him leave after the lone season, but fell behind the Fukuoka SoftBank Hawks as the year progressed. Under the playoff format of the time, the preliminary five-game playoff round, prior to the Japan Series, saw the teams with the best first and second half records face off. The Marines defeated the Hawks three games to two in the Pacific League championship, winning the rubber match despite entering the eighth inning trailing, 2–1.

The Marines were thus qualified for the Japan Series, the first time they had reached the tournament since 1974, after 31 years. In a one-sided series, the Marines swept the Hanshin Tigers in four games, scoring ten runs in each of the first three games. The apparent ease with which the Marines defeated the Tigers added fuel to the ongoing debate concerning the need for a playoff system in the Central League, which was finally added in 2007 (see Climax Series). The Marines went on to defeat South Korea's Samsung Lions in the final round of the Konami Cup Championships.

In 2010, the Marines clinched third place on the last day of the season to earn a berth into the Climax Series. They went on to become the first third place team to ever win the Climax Series, and faced off with the Chunichi Dragons in the 2010 Japan Series. The Marines defeated the Dragons in seven games, composed of four wins, two losses, and one tie, winning their second Japan Series in under ten years.

In 2013, the Marines clinched third place to clinch a berth in the Climax Series and faced the Saitama Seibu Lions in the first stage. They defeated the Lions in 3 games to move onto the final stage. They would lose to the Tohoku Rakuten Golden Eagles in 5 games, who would go on and defeat the Yomiuri Giants in 7 games to win their first (and still only) Japan Series title.

They would make it back in the playoffs in 2015. They defeated the Hokkaido Nippon-Ham Fighters in 3 games in the first round, then got swept by the Fukuoka SoftBank Hawks, who received a one-game advantage for having the best record in the Pacific League.

The following season, they returned to the playoffs. They would make a much earlier exit, as they were swept by the Hawks in two games in the first stage.

It would not be until 2020 when they returned to the playoffs. The Hawks, with a one-game advantage, would sweep them again in the first stage.

They bounced back the following year by defeating the Eagles in 2 games in the first stage, including a tie in the second game which allowed them to advance as they had the better record at 67-57-19, while the Eagles had a 66-62-15 record. They got swept by the Orix Buffaloes in the final stage in 3 games, however a tie in the third game and Orix having the better record at 70-55-18, allowed the Buffaloes to advance.

On April 10, 2022, Rōki Sasaki threw a perfect game, Nippon Professional Baseball's first in 28 years and the 16th in the league's history. Sasaki tied an existing record by striking out 19 batters, and setting a new record by striking out 13 consecutive batters. It didn't do much to help the season, as the Marines finished in 5th place with a 69-73-1 record, and Tadahito Iguchi would be let go after that season, replaced by Masato Yoshii.

The Marines would edge out the Hawks and Eagles in a close playoff race in 2023, finishing 2nd with a 70-68-5 record. They would defeat the Hawks in 3 games in the first stage, but lost in 5 games to the Buffaloes in the final stage, who also had a 1-win advantage for having the best record in Pacific League. The season would be the last for ZOZO Marine Stadium public address announcer Emi Taniho. Originally, she was given a farewell ceremony on October 7, 2023, supposedly her last home game, which included many former Marines players, but she was given extended duty, as the Marines were appearing to make a run for the Climax Series. The game was also her 2,100th game announcing. Her actual last day with the team was on December 20.

== Current roster ==
Chiba Lotte Marines roster
First team		Second team
Pitchers: 15 Rikuto Yokoyama; 33 Akira Yagi; 36 Kōshirō Sakamoto; 37 Fumiya Ono; 46 Hayato Fuji; 47 Shōta Suzuki; 48 Joey Lucchesi; 52 Naoya Masuda; 56 Shunsuke Nakamori; 60 Yamato; 64 Kōshirō Hiroike; 66 Hayato Miyazaki; 93 Kaishū Takahashi; Catchers: 2 Kou Matsukawa; 32 Toshiya Satoh; 65 Ryūsei Terachi; 69 Ryōju Okamura	Infielders: 00 Raito Ikeda; 10 Kyūto Ueda; 38 Tsuyoshi Yamasaki; 44 Ryūsei Miyazaki; 55 Yūya Sakurai; 57 Ryūsei Ogawa; 99 Neftalí Soto; Outfielders: 0 Akito Takabe; 1 Kyōta Fujiwara; 6 Mishō Nishikawa; 39 Kouta Inoue; 51 Kōki Yamaguchi; 61 Daito Yamamoto; Manager: 86 Saburō; Coaches: 90 Hidekazu Mitsuyama (Head/Chief battery); 77 Tsuyoshi Nishioka (Chief batting/base running); 80 Hideaki Matsuyama (Chief infield defense/base running); 84 Tomohiro Kuroki (Pitching); 71 Hiroyuki Kobayashi (Pitching); 88 Kenta Kurihara (Batting); 76 Naoya Emura (Battery); 87 Shunichi Nemoto (Infield defense/base running); 74 Shōta Ishimine (Outfield defense/base running)	Pitchers: 11 José Castillo; 13 Kaito Mouri; 14 Kazuya Ojima; 16 Atsuki Taneichi; 18 Genki Ishigaki; 19 Yūki Karakawa; 21 Shūta Ishikawa; 24 Yūsuke Azuma; 28 Riku Kikuchi; 29 Yūji Nishino; 30 Atsuya Hirohata; 31 Hikaru Ohtani; 34 Shūta Takano; 35 Haruya Tanaka; 40 Raito Okumura; 41 Rikima Ichijō; 42 Andre Jackson; 53 Yūto Kimura; 54 Keisuke Sawada; 58 Tokito Kawamura; 59 Oto Hayasaka; 62 Haru Sakai; 73 Sam Long; 91 Yūto Yoshikawa; 92 Ryōtarō Mori; Catchers: 27 Tatsuhiro Tamura; 45 Shōta Ueda	Infielders: 4 Atsuki Tomosugi; 5 Hisanori Yasuda; 7 Yūdai Fujioka; 8 Shōgo Nakamura; 43 Masami Ishigaki; 49 Yū Tatematsu; 67 Kenta Chatani; Outfielders: 3 Katsuya Kakunaka; 22 Gregory Polanco; 23 Shingo Ishikawa; 25 Hiromi Oka; 50 Aito; 63 Kōshirō Wada; Manager: 70 Kazuya Fukuura (General batting); Coaches: 78 Kenji Ōtonari (Pitching); 79 Takahiro Matsunaga (Pitching); 81 Manabu Mima (Pitching); 85 Masaki Minami (Development/pitching); 75 Kōichi Hori (Batting); 82 Kei Hosoya (Batting); 89 Takeshi Kanazawa (Battery); 72 Ryō Miki (Infield defense/base running); 83 Kenji Morozumi (Outfield defense/base running)
Development Players
121 Fumiya Motomae (P); 123 Seiun Akiyama (P); 124 Ryōta Nakamura (P); 125 Kirato Nagashimada (P); 126 Yūto Nakayama (P); 131 Yūta Ibaragi (P); 132 Kōsuke Nagashima (P); 133 Ryōta Takeuchi (P); 139 Chariel Radney (P); 137 Kōnoshin Tomiyama (C); 120 Yūta Kaneda (IF); 129 Rui Katsumata (IF); 130 Tsuyoshi Tanimura (IF); 134 Shinya Matsuishi (IF); 128 Ryō Sugiyama (OF); 135 Hikaru Kohno (OF); 136 Kazuki Fujita (OF); 140 Stiven Acevedo (OF)
Updated October 6, 2026		→ All NPB rosters

=== Notable former players ===
- (United States) Benny Agbayani (also known as "Benny")
- (Japan) Hiromitsu Ochiai
- (Cuba) Alfredo Despaigne
- (United States) Mike Diaz
- (Dominican Republic) Jose Fernández
- (Dominican Republic) Julio Franco
- (United States) Matt Franco
- (United States) Mel Hall
- (South Korea) Isao Harimoto
- (South Korea) Baek In-chun
- (United States) Pete Incaviglia
- (Japan) Hideki Irabu
- (Japan) Kazuya Fukuura (retired in 2019)
- (Japan) Masaaki Kitaru
- (Japan) Kiyoshi Hatsushiba
- (Japan) Masahide Kobayashi
- (Japan) Tsuyoshi Nishioka
- (Japan) Satoru Komiyama (retired in 2009)
- (United States) Bill Madlock
- (United States) Leon Lee (Derrek's father)
- (United States) Leron Lee (Derrek's uncle)
- (Japan) Choji Murata (elected to Japanese Baseball Hall of Fame in 2005)
- (United States) Jim Lefebvre
- (United States) Darryl Motley
- (United States) Bill R.W. Murphy
- (Japan) Yuhei Nakaushiro
- (Taiwan) Katsuo So
- (Japan) Kazuhiro Yamauchi
- (Japan) Akihito Igarashi
- (Japan) Michiyo Arito
- (Japan) Saburo Omura (also known as "Saburo", retired in 2016)
- (Japan) Tomohiro Kuroki (also known as "Johnny Kuroki")
- (Japan) Katsuya Nomura
- (Japan) Tomoya Satozaki (retired in 2014)
- (United States) Dan Serafini
- (South Korea) Lee Seung-yuop
- (Japan) Naoyuki Shimizu (traded to Yokohama BayStars in 2009)
- (South Korea) Kim Tae-kyun
- (Japan) Norifumi Nishimura
- (Japan) Shunsuke Watanabe
- (Panama) Julio Zuleta
- (United States) Frank Bolick
- (United States) Derrick May
- (United States) Rick Short
- (United States) Brian Sikorski
- (Venezuela) José Castillo
- (Taiwan) Chen Kuan-yu
- (Taiwan) Chen Wei-Yin
- (Mexico) Luis Cruz
- (Japan) Toshihide Narimoto
- (Japan) Makoto Kosaka
- (Japan) Koichi Hori
- (Cuba) Adeiny Hechavarria
- (United States) Leonys Martín
- (Japan) Hiroyuki Yamazaki
- (Japan) Yukinaga Maeda
- (Japan) Kazuhiko Ushijima
- (Japan) Tadahito Iguchi
- (Japan) Hideaki Takazawa
- (Japan) Kihachi Enomoto
- (Dominican Republic) Luis Perdomo
- (United States) Eric Hillman
- (Japan) Roki Sasaki

=== MLB players ===
Active:

- Roki Sasaki (2025–present)
- Dallas Keuchel (2012–2024)

Former:

- Hirokazu Sawamura (2021–2022)

Retired:

- Hideki Irabu (1997–2002)
- Masato Yoshii (1998–2002)
- Satoru Komiyama (2002)
- Tadahito Iguchi (2005–2008)
- Masahide Kobayashi (2008–2009)
- Tsuyoshi Nishioka (2011–2012)
- Ryohei Tanaka (2009–2011)
- Yasuhiko Yabuta (2008–2009)
- Shunsuke Watanabe (2014)
- Yuhei Nakaushiro (2016–2018)

=== Honored number ===
Fans' number
Retired
2005
- 26 – This number was retired in honor of the Marines' fans in 2005. It was inspired by some teams in other sports (such as football, which retires "12" for the "12th man", or basketball, which retires "6" for the "6th man"). The Tohoku Rakuten Golden Eagles has the No. 10 retired in similar fashion. Major League Baseball's Los Angeles Angels has retired No. 26, in same fashion, for the founder Gene Autry.

== Managers ==
No.	Years in office	YR	Managers	G	W	L	T	Win%	Pacific League championships	Japan Series championships	Playoff berths
1	1950–1951	2	Yuasa Yoshio	230	135	85	10	.614	1 (1950)	1 (1950)	
2	1952	1	Yuasa Yoshio; Kaoru Betto (1st)	120	75	45	0	.625			
3	1953	1	Tadashi Wakabayashi	120	56	62	2	.475			
4	1954–1959	6	Kaoru Betto (2nd)	834	467	341	26	.578			
5	1960	1	Yukio Nishimoto	133	82	48	3	.631	1 (1960)		
6	1961–1962	2	Mitsuo Uno	272	132	136	4	.493			
7	1963–1965	3	Yasuji Hondo	440	203	227	10	.472			
8	1966	1	Hitoshi Tamaru	134	61	69	4	.469			
9	1967	1	Katsuki Tokura, Watarui Nonin	137	61	69	7	.469			
10	1968–1970	3	Watarui Nonin	399	216	164	19	.568	1 (1970)		
11	1971	1	Watarui Nonin, Keiji Osawa	130	80	46	4	.635			
12	1972	1	Keiji Osawa	130	59	68	3	.465			
13	1973–1978	6	Masaichi Kaneda (1st)	780	374	339	67	.525	1 (1974)	1 (1974)	2 (1974, 1977)
14	1979–1981	3	Kazuhiro Yamauchi	390	182	171	37	.516			2 (1980, 1981)
15	1982–1983	2	Kazuyoshi Yamamoto	260	97	145	18	.401			
16	1984–1986	3	Kazuhisa Inao	390	185	175	30	.514			
17	1987–1989	3	Michiyo Arito	390	153	213	24	.418			
18	1990–1991	2	Masaichi Kaneda (2nd)	260	105	148	7	.415			
19	1992–1994	3	Soroku Yagisawa	390	160	224	6	.417			
20	1995	1	Bobby Valentine (1st)	130	69	58	3	.543			
21	1996	1	Akira Ejiri	130	60	67	3	.472			
22	1997–1998	2	Akihito Kondo	270	118	147	5	.445			
23	1999–2003	5	Koji Yamamoto	690	324	352	14	.479			
24	2004–2009	6	Bobby Valentine (2nd)	837	425	392	20	.520	1 (2005)	1 (2005)	2 (2005, 2007)
25	2010–2012	3	Norifumi Nishimura	432	191	213	28	.472		1 (2010)	1 (2010)
26	2013–2017	5	Tsutomu Itoh	717	339	368	10	.473			3 times (2013, 2015, 2016)
27	2018–2022	5	Tadahito Iguchi	692	324	338	30	.489			2 (2020, 2021)
28	2023–2025	2	Masato Yoshii	286	141	134	11	.512			2 (2023, 2024)
Totals	71 seasons		23 managers	9,551	4,597	4,580	374	.501	5 times	4 times	11 times

- Statistics current through the end of the 2025 season.

== Cheer dancers ==
The Marines' cheer dancing squad is known as M☆Splash!!. They were formed in 2004. Alongside the team's mascots Mar-kun, Rine-chan and Zu-chan, they entertain the crowd during Marines games, with 27 members.

== Mascots ==
Mar-kun (マーくん, Maa-kun) is the main mascot character of the Marines. With his girlfriend Rine-chan (リーンちゃん, Riin-chan) and his young brother Zu-chan (ズーちゃん, Zuu-chan), he entertains spectators at team games. Their names remain separate from the team name. Originally Rine-chan wore a pink sports visor cap until the 2022 season when she wore the same baseball cap as her boyfriend while retaining the skirt, while Zu-chan wears the cap backwards and wears an apron instead of the jersey beginning 2022, before that he wore a shirt unless all three wear their team's special home uniforms.

Mysterious fish (謎の魚, Nazo-no-sakana) was a mascot character that was introduced in May 2017. He is a weird fish with legs. He has collaborated with Hawaiian Airlines that former Marines' player Benny Agbayani works for since 2018. However, the person playing the mascot announced after the 2021 season that he would retire, which also meant the mascot was officially retired.

Back when the team were known as the "Lotte Orions", their mascot was a character known simply as Bubble-Boy (バブル坊や, Bable-Boya) who only appeared as a logo.

In 2005, the Marines introduced a mascot named Cool-kun ( かっこいいくん, Kakkoi-kun), a penguin who was known for his acrobatic stunts and would often challenge mascots like Doala and B.B to acrobatic stunt contests at rival games. He also would be stuck up and rude at times, but he would burst to tears or show great emotion at the right time. Despite being friends with Mar-kun, they do not get along very well. In 2016, he was retired by the team.

== Minor League team ==
The Marines farm team plays in the Eastern League. The team was founded as the Mainichi Glitter Orions in 1950.

== See also ==
- Lotte Giants
- Lotte Group
