= Rakuten Mobile Saikyo Park Miyagi =

Baseball stadium in Sendai, Japan

- 楽天モバイル 最強パーク宮城

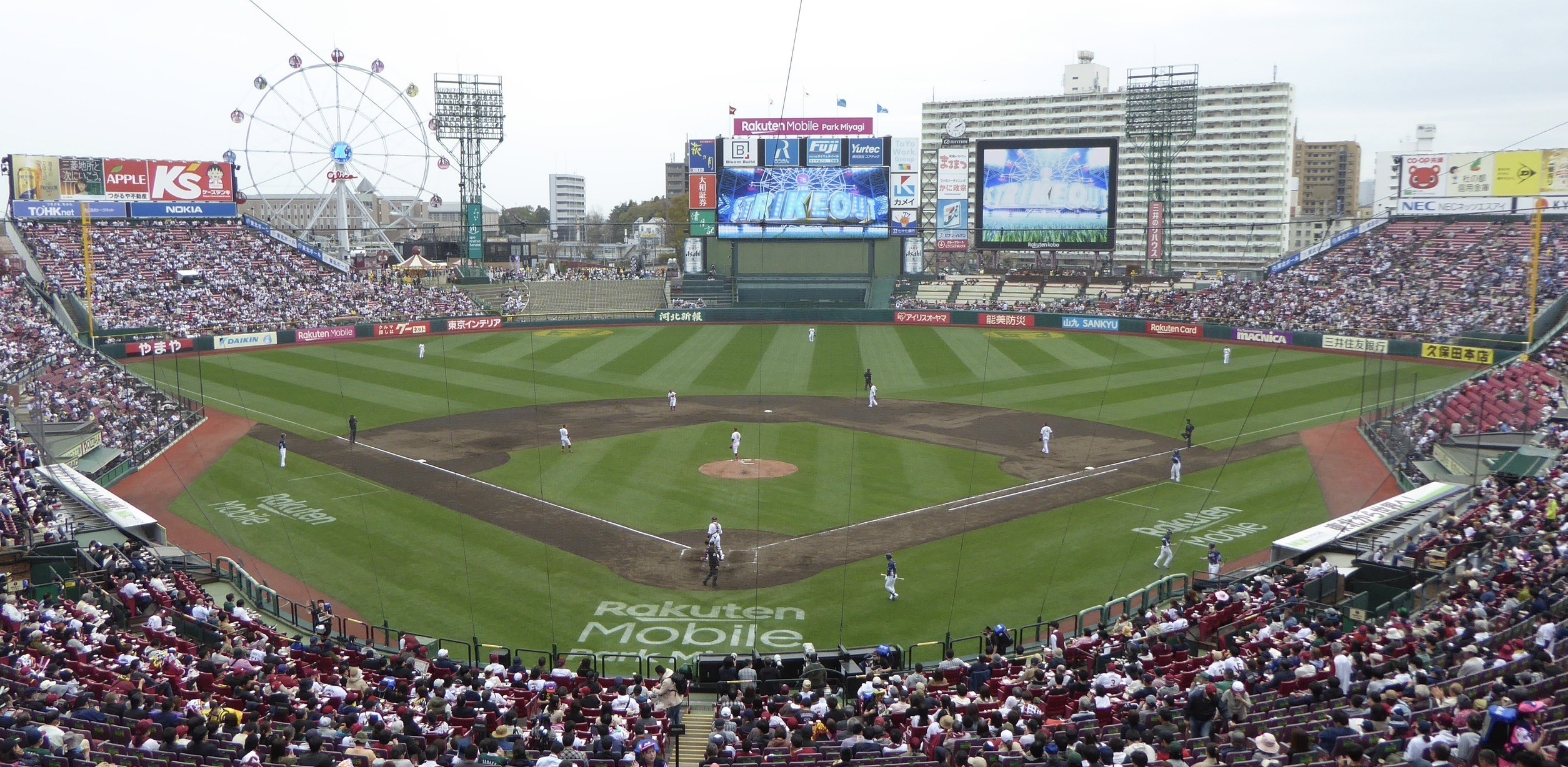
- Rakuten Mobile Park Miyagi in 2023
- Interactive map of Rakuten Mobile Saikyo Park Miyagi
- Former names: Miyagi Baseball Stadium (1950–2005); Fullcast Stadium Miyagi (2005–2007); Kleenex Stadium Miyagi (2008–2010); Nippon Paper Kleenex Stadium Miyagi (2011–2013); Rakuten Kobo Stadium Miyagi (2014–2016); Kobo Park Miyagi (2017); Rakuten Seimei Park Miyagi (2018–2022); Rakuten Mobile Park Miyagi (2023–2025)
- Address: 2-11-6 Miyagino, Miyagino-ku
- Location: Sendai, Miyagi, Japan
- Coordinates: 38°15′22.34″N 140°54′9″E
- Owner: Miyagi Prefecture
- Operator: Rakuten Baseball, Inc.
- Capacity: 30,508
- Surface: Grass (1950–2004, 2015–present); FieldTurf (2005–2015)
- Field size: Left/right field – 100.1 m (328 ft); Left-center – 110 m (360 ft); Center field – 122 m (400 ft); Right-center – 112 m (367 ft)
- Public transit: JR East: Senseki Line at Miyaginohara; Tōhoku Shinkansen at Sendai; Sendai Subway: Tōzai Line at Yakushido; Namboku Line at Sendai

Construction
- Opened: May 5, 1950 (first game); May 27, 1950 (construction completed)
- Renovated: 1973, 1984, 2004–2019

Tenants
- Lotte Orions (NPB) (1973–1977); Tohoku Rakuten Golden Eagles (NPB) (2005–present)

Rakuten Mobile Saikyo Park Miyagi (楽天モバイル 最強パーク宮城, Rakuten Mobairu Saikyō Pāku Miyagi), also named Miyagi Baseball Stadium, is a baseball stadium in Miyaginohara Sports Park in Sendai, Miyagi Prefecture, Japan. The 30,508-seat park is owned by the prefecture and operated by Rakuten, which has used it as the home field for the Tohoku Rakuten Golden Eagles of Nippon Professional Baseball (NPB) since 2005. Its symmetrical playing surface is the only all natural grass field in the Pacific League (PL). An amusement park, Smile Glico Park, is integrated into the stadium's left field seating and features a Ferris wheel and merry-go-round.

Miyagi Stadium is the third-oldest NPB stadium and the oldest in the PL. It was built in 1950 to host amateur baseball and countryside NPB games. Lights were added in 1973 for night games and to attract more professional games. The Lotte Orions began using it as a semi-home that same year and played five seasons there until 1977. In 1974, the Orions brought the stadium its first postseason games, however Japan Series games were not held in the stadium due to its relatively low seating capacity. Following Lotte's departure, the park again hosted yearly NPB countryside games, amateur games, and the first of four All-Star games was held there in 1992.

After the 2004 NPB realignment, Rakuten created a new NPB team to be based in Sendai and renovated Miyagi Stadium in several phases. With Major League Baseball stadiums as inspiration, the field was enlarged, the stadium's concourses were expanded, seating was updated, and its capacity was increased. In the outfield, two full-LED video boards were erected and the amusement park was built. The exterior was also significantly updated. The stadium hosted its first Climax Series and Japan Series in 2013, when the Eagles went on to win the championship.

Naming rights for the stadium have been sold in three-year increments several times since 2005. Staffing firm Fullcast and Nippon Paper Industries were the first two companies to buy them. Since 2014, Rakuten has purchased the stadium's naming rights, using it to promote their Kobo eReader, life insurance and mobile carrier. The stadium has been named Rakuten Mobile Saikyo Park Miyagi since 2026.

== History ==
Hyojogawara Stadium in Sendai began hosting chihō (地方), or "countryside", Japanese Baseball League games in 1948, prior to the 1949 Japanese professional baseball reorganization. However, in October 1949, Miyagi Prefecture started redeveloping a nearby former Imperial Japanese Army training ground into Miyaginohara Sports Park, which would include a new baseball stadium and a general athletic stadium. The 28,000-capacity ballpark, dubbed Miyagi Baseball Stadium, opened in 1950, and Nippon Professional Baseball (NPB) began playing official games there that same year. Its first two official Pacific League (PL) games were a doubleheader played on May 5, three weeks before the facility's completion on May 27. The two games, featuring the Mainichi Orions against the Nankai Hawks and the Daiei Stars, were extremely popular. Spectators began arriving to the stadium the night before and thousands of fans had gathered by morning. In an attempt to quickly disperse the restless crowd, organizers moved the gate opening ahead from 10 am to 8 am. The crowd then rushed into the stadium's entrance tunnel resulting in a crush that killed three people and injured others. At the same time, outside the stadium, the overflow crowd began climbing a fence in an attempt to gain entry. The fence collapsed, injuring 31 people, twelve seriously.

While Miyagi Stadium was also used to host games for the Japanese High School Baseball Championship's annual Miyagi Prefecture regional tournament, approximately only two professional games per season were played at the ballpark on average in the first two decades of its existence. In the spring of 1972, former baseball scout Isao Uko lobbied for the installation of lights at Miyagi Stadium to allow for night games. He believed that the lights could help attract up to 30 professional games to the stadium annually. Tohoku Baseball Company was created to help fund the project with investments from local businesses in the Tōhoku region such as the Kahoku Shimpō. Six 32-metre-tall light towers were installed along with a partially-electric scoreboard before the start of the 1973 season.

=== Semi-home of "Gypsy" Lotte ===
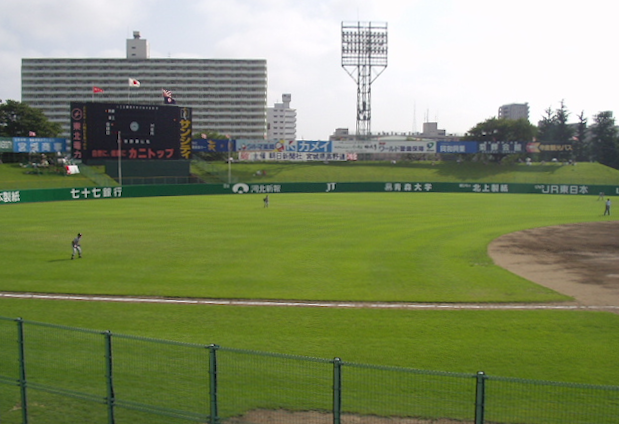
The outfield, lights, and scoreboard in 2004

At the same time lights were being installed at Miyagi Stadium, Tokyo Stadium was getting ready to close following the 1972 season. This closure left the Lotte Orions without a home field next season. Miyagi's new lighting equipment helped lure the Orions to Sendai and the team agreed to play a portion of its games there in 1973. Lotte's first game at the ballpark on May 22, 1973, was the stadium's first night game, as well as the first night game played in the entire Tōhoku region. The ballpark hosted 32 NPB games that season, including 26 Lotte games. That year, Orions pitcher Soroku Yagisawa threw the stadium's first perfect game on October 10 against the Taiheiyo Club Lions.

After utilizing Miyagi Stadium as a semi-home in 1973, the Pacific League and Lotte agreed to move the team's protected area from Tokyo to Miyagi for the following season. NPB opened a season in Tōhoku for the first time with a Lotte game in Miyagi Stadium on April 6, 1974. Contrary to local expectations, however, the Lotte Orions only considered Sendai to be a temporary home until a new one could be found. Despite officially moving the team, the Orions continued to play only about half of their home games there with the other half being split among other stadiums primarily in the Kantō region. Furthermore, the team's offices remained in Tokyo and the players continued to reside in the Tokyo metropolitan area. The unusual home field situation led the Orions to be known as a "Gypsy" team. After the Orions won the second half of the season in 1974, Miyagi Stadium hosted its first postseason games in that year's PL Playoffs. Lotte won the series and advanced to the Japan Series, however these games were not held in Sendai because of Miyagi Stadium's relatively low capacity. Instead, their home games were held at Korakuen Stadium in Tokyo. After winning the series, Lotte held their victory parade in Tokyo as well.

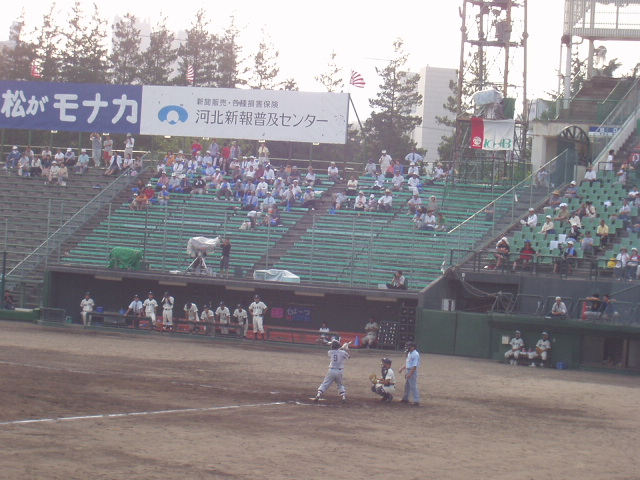
The all-dirt infield and first base side seating in 2004

Local Sendai fans were disappointed with the team's attitude toward the city. Lotte's attendance, which had been the highest in the Pacific League in 1973, dropped to second place the following season. After five years playing in Sendai, it was announced on October 4, 1977, that the team would relocate to Kawasaki Stadium in Kanagawa Prefecture the next season. That night, the Orions fought for a playoff spot during their last regular season game. When they lost the lead in the ninth inning, fans threw cans and bottles onto the field which required the game to be temporarily suspended. Lotte manager Masaichi Kaneda appealed to the crowd on the public address system to let the players finish the game explaining that they were trying their best. Despite the loss, the Orions advanced to the 1977 Pacific League Playoffs and again played their games at Miyagi, however this time they failed to advance to the Japan Series. It would be another 28 years before the stadium had another full-time NPB tenant.

Immediately after relocating to Kawasaki, Lotte continued to hold approximately ten countryside games annually at Miyagi Stadium. In 1978, Hankyu Braves pitcher Yutaro Imai threw the second and last perfect game at the stadium against the Orions. However, the number of games the team held there decreased drastically after they moved to Chiba in 1992. Miyagi Stadium stopped hosting Lotte games altogether after 2004. In addition to collaborating with Lotte, Tohoku Baseball Company also worked with the other Pacific League teams as well as some Central League teams to host countryside games at the stadium. An All-Star game was held in Miyagi Stadium for the first time when it hosted the third game in the 1992 All-Star Series. It was the first time the event was held in a countryside stadium. In addition to holding some NPB events, the stadium also continued to host local amateur baseball games.

=== Dedicated Rakuten home ===
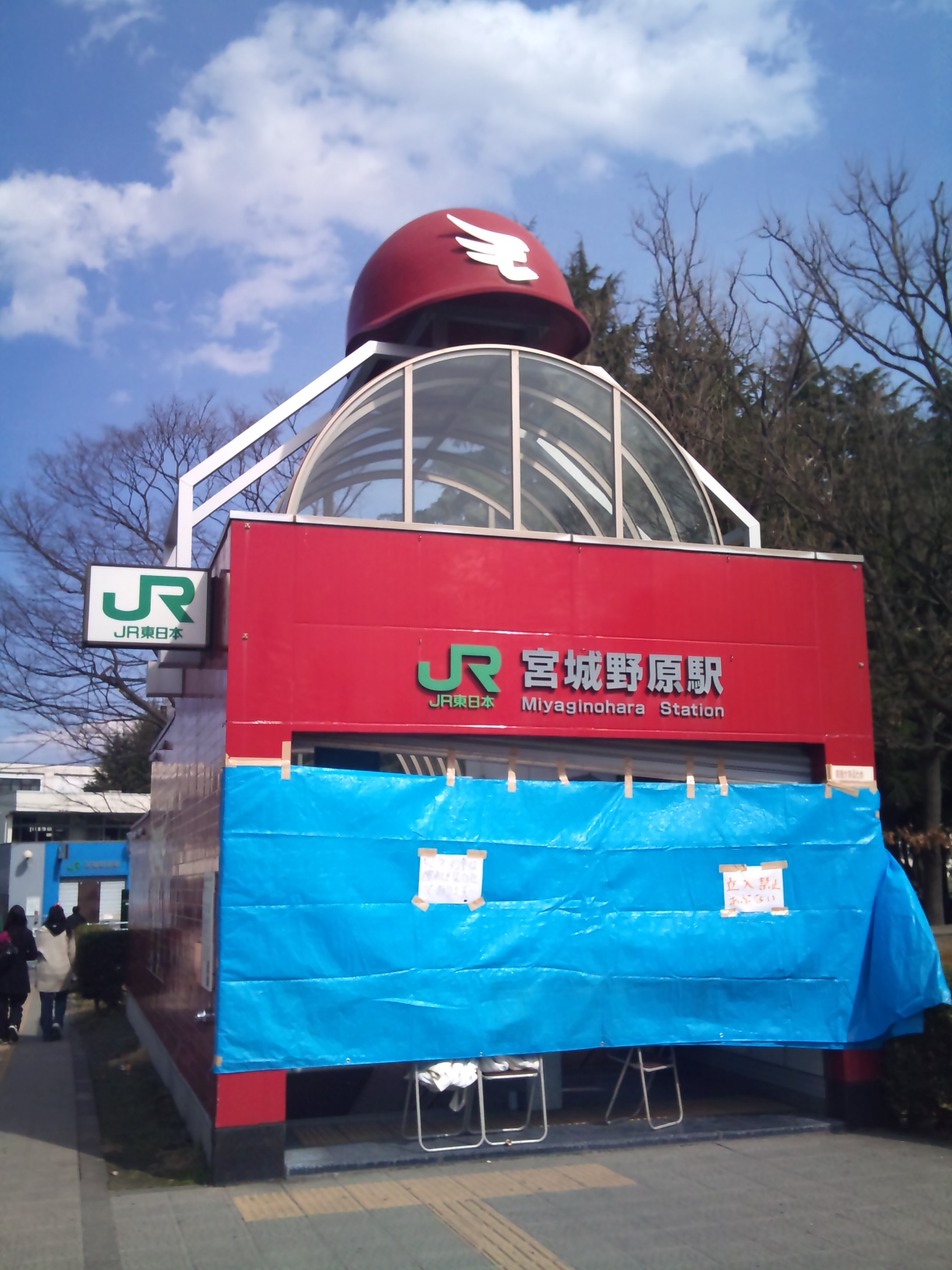
Damage to the nearby Miyaginohara Station following the 2011 Tōhoku earthquake

During the 2004 NPB realignment, the Osaka Kintetsu Buffaloes merged with the Orix BlueWave, leaving the PL with five teams instead of six for the 2005 season In the wake of the loss, two Internet service companies, Rakuten and Livedoor, applied to start new teams, however NPB representatives maintained that the 2006 season would be the earliest a new team could enter the league. The players wanted any new teams ready for the next season and when no agreement was reached the players staged a two-day strike on September 18–19. With the strike set to continue the following weekend, team representatives eased the rules of entry for new teams into the professional leagues and that one would be allowed to join the following season. Both Rakuten and Livedoor's team plans included basing the team out of Miyagi Stadium in Sendai. On November 2, NPB selected Rakuten over Livedoor to create a new Pacific League team to be based in Sendai. After being chosen, Miyagi Prefecture and Rakuten agreed on lease agreement that would allow the team to play in the prefecture's stadium for a modest ¥50 million per year. Furthermore, the team was allowed to manage the facility, giving them access to all revenue collected from the sale of all advertising, goods, and concessions within Miyagi Stadium. In exchange, Rakuten agreed to pay for the costs of renovating the stadium. Of the 12 major NPB stadiums, Miyagi Stadium is the only prefecture-owned ballpark. All others are either owned by cities or privately owned.

After moving to Sendai, Rakuten renovated Miyagi Stadium in several phases, drastically changing and modernizing the ballpark. In 2007, for the first time in fifteen years and since becoming the permanent home of an NPB team, a game in the All-Star Series was played at the stadium. Two seasons later, it hosted its first Climax Series when the Eagles qualified for the 2009 postseason for the first time. Two weeks before the start of the 2011 season, the Tōhoku region was struck by the largest earthquake in Japan's history. The quake and the subsequent tsunami devastated the region, including the city of Sendai. Following the event, 47 areas of Miyagi Stadium were identified as needing repairs, with its lighting towers sustaining the most damage. While the stadium was being repaired, the Eagles played their home games at Koshien Stadium and Hotto Motto Field. Baseball returned to Sendai on April 29, when the Eagles played their first game at their home field. An opening ceremony attended by the governor of Miyagi Prefecture Yoshihiro Murai and United States Ambassador John Roos was held before the game. After the disaster, NPB decided to move the final game of the 2011 All-Star Series from Tokyo Dome to Kleenex Stadium, the second time the Eagles hosted the event in four years.

The Eagles clinched their first Pacific League title in 2013, making Miyagi Stadium the host of the final stage of the Climax Series for the first time and setting up the possibility of holding its first Japan Series games. In preparation for these games, Rakuten spent ¥100 million adding temporary seating to the park to increase its seating capacity for the events. Rakuten won the 2013 Climax Series, allowing Miyagi Stadium to host its first ever Japan Series, which the Eagles went on to win. The temporary stands were eventually dismantled and replaced with permanent seating options. The 2013 Japan Series was the last time the stadium hosted a postseason game, however it again hosted an All-Star game in 2021, its fourth time.

After Rakuten renovated Miyagi Stadium and the Eagles moved in, high school and other amateur baseball organizations continued to rent out the ballpark. Amateur use of the stadium decreased significantly after the installation of the natural grass field in 2016, however, as amateur organizations were restricted from renting out Miyagi Stadium due to the need to protect the natural grass. Furthermore, stadium usage fees increased. After the COVID-19 pandemic resulted in the cancellation of the Miyagi Prefecture's 2020 High School Baseball Championship summer tournament, Miyagi Stadium did not host games for the tournament the next two years. In June 2022, Miyagi Prefectural Baseball Organization Council submitted a petition to the prefecture asking for a reduction in stadium usage fees and loosening of usage restrictions to make it more accessible to amateur baseball. In 2023, the prefecture's summer high school tournament returned to Miyagi Stadium, which hosted the semi-final and final games. Miyagi Stadium was selected as one of the "150 Best Baseball Holy Sites and Famous Places" in Japan by NPB in 2022 and was cited as a "sacred place for amateur baseball in Tohoku".

== Design and features ==
Miyagi Stadium was first built in the style of a traditional Japanese-style baseball stadium, a facility with symmetrical stands and outfield wall. When Rakuten began renovating the facility in 2004, however, they implemented a "ball park concept" that expanded seating and entertainment options. The plan modified the facility into one that more closely resembles a Major League Baseball stadium. The stadium's Smile Glico Park is modeled after Petco Park's Park at the Park and intended to help attract non-baseball fans to Miyagi Stadium. The transformation of Miyagi Stadium away from a traditional Japanese-style park slowly started a trend in NPB, with other ballparks such as Mazda Stadium and Es Con Field Hokkaido following suit in 2009 and 2023, respectively.

=== Capacity ===

From the facility's completion in 1950 until Rakuten began renovating in 2004, Miyagi Stadium accommodated approximately 28,000 people. This relatively low capacity factored into the decision to not play any of the 1974 Japan Series games there. Initially, Rakuten's announced renovation design revealed that the ballpark's seating capacity was planned to be 23,000 by the start of the 2005 season and 28,000 by the following spring. After the two-stage renovation, however, its seating capacity was only 20,000 and 23,000, respectively. Almost yearly redevelopment caused the number to continually change. It was reduced to 22,187 in 2008 and 22,098 in 2009, but expanded to 23,026 in 2010. By the start of 2013, capacity was increased to 23,451 and again to 23,466 by April. Rakuten was cautious about rapidly expanding the stands because of the stadium's location in a public park and Sendai's population of approximately 1 million people, a relatively small market for a baseball franchise in Japan. Furthermore, its location in a public park subject Japan's City Park Law, an ordinance dictating how much park space can be occupied by buildings, made it difficult to freely expand the facility.

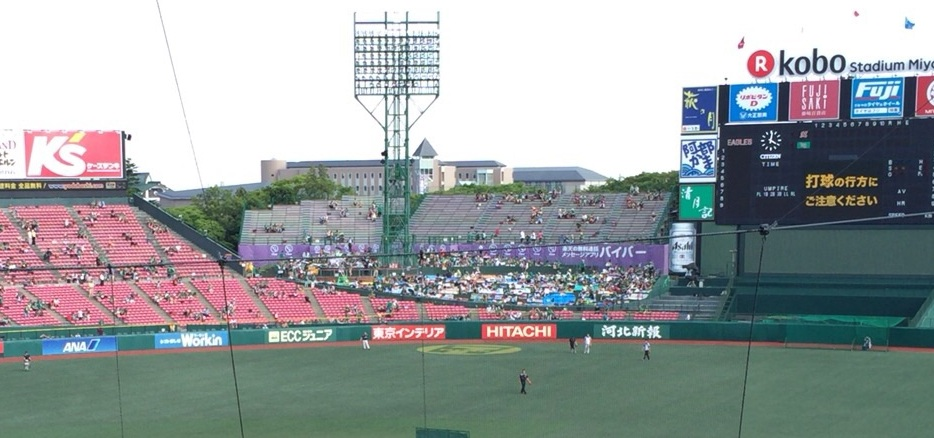
A temporary seating section in left field in 2015

After the Eagles advanced to the second stage of the 2009 Climax Series, NPB became concerned about Miyagi Stadium's low seating capacity. Compared to the other ballparks in NPB that all held at least 30,000 people, Rakuten's approximate capacity of 22,000 was significantly lower. Though they were eliminated in the second stage, if Rakuten had won and advanced to the Japan Series, NPB claimed that there would have been a ¥100 million profit difference per game held at Miyagi Stadium compared to the Sapporo Dome. This loss of profit would have not only affected Rakuten, but also the Central League team they played and NPB, as proceeds from Japan Series attendance are split among the three parties. NPB's concern led to some speculation that if the Eagles ever advanced to a Japan Series, the games would not be held in Miyagi Stadium. Instead of increasing the ballparks's seating capacity, Rakuten suggested that they could increase ticket prices to make up the difference. Team owners and NPB, however, requested that they increase capacity to at least 28,000, citing Rakuten's original pledge to do so when they were first awarded a team.

Mid-season in 2013, the Eagles were in first place in the Pacific League and selling out games played at Miyagi Stadium. To help meet fan demand, Rakuten erected two temporary seating sections in the ballpark. The resulting 936-seat section along the third-base line and the 1,249-seat section on the left field lawn increased Miyagi's capacity from 23,466 to 25,651. The seats opened to fans that September. However, NPB had been pushing Rakuten to increase the stadium's capacity to at least 28,000, specifically if it needed to host Japan Series games, therefore Rakuten continued to add more temporary seating in early October as the postseason neared. Before it hosted its first final stage during the 2013 Climax Series, more temporary and standing seats brought the stadium's capacity to 26,965. Finally, the addition of 1,155 standing seats before the 2013 Japan Series brought Miyagi Stadium's capacity to 28,120.

Following the Japan Series, the temporary stands down the third-base line and in left field were dismantled. In the offseason, another temporary seating section was constructed in left field, bringing capacity to 25,717. Five months later, work was completed on new, permanent seating in the former location of the temporary stands down the third-base line. The 3,019-seat section pushed the stadium's capacity over 28,000 once again. The last large-scale renovation of the ballpark occurred in the 2015–16 offseason that dramatically increased its capacity one last time. The project removed the temporary stands in middle-left field that could seat approximately 4,000 spectators and instead constructed a park capable of accommodating around 7,000, bringing Miyagi Stadium to its current capacity of 30,508 people.

=== Field ===
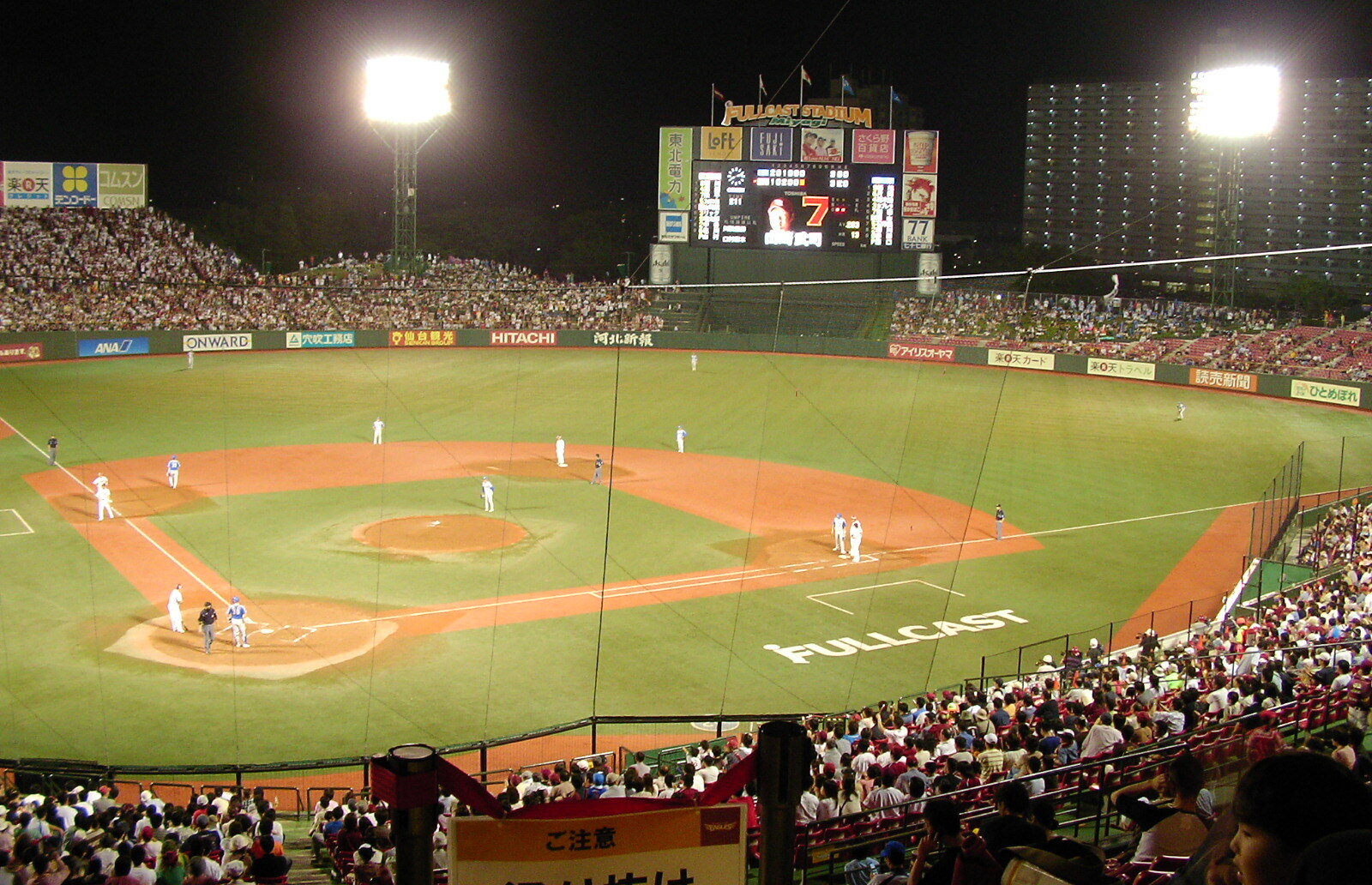
Artificial turf in 2006

From its opening in 1950 until 2004, Miyagi Stadium's playing field featured a natural grass outfield and a dirt infield; the distances from home plate to the outfield wall were symmetrical: 91.4 metres (300 ft) to the foul poles and 122 metres (400 ft) to the center field wall. Rakuten's first renovation of the stadium prior to the 2005 season dramatically changed the field. The foul poles were pushed back to 101.5 metres (333 ft), the longest in NPB at the time, and the left- and right-center field walls were extended to 117 metres (384 ft). Two seating sections were also constructed on the field along the first and third baselines, greatly reducing the stadium's foul territory. Additionally, this renovation converted the natural grass and dirt playing field to an artificial surface using FieldTurf. This artificial turf had to be replaced once after the 2007 season. The outfield dimensions changed again during the 2012–13 offseason when two new seating sections were built in left- and right-center fields that protruded from the existing outfield seating. These new sections effectively created a "lucky zones" on the field, a Japanese term that describes moving an outfield wall to make hitting home runs easier. The additions reshaped the field dimensions to 100.1 metres (328 ft) to each foul pole, 116 metres (381 ft) to the outfield walls in left/right-center, 122 metres to dead center. These lucky zones were then enlarged before the 2026 season with the installation of two new 1.8-to-2-metre (5.9 to 6.6 ft) high outfield walls in left/right-center fields. The new, lower fences kept the dimensions to left, right, and center fields unchanged, however the distances to left-center and right center fields changed to 110 metres (360 ft) and 112 metres (367 ft), respectively.

Miyagi Stadium's artificial turf was eventually removed and natural grass was again introduced prior to the start of the 2016 season. At the time, it was the only natural grass field in the Pacific League. Originally, when arranging for the turf conversion, the ballpark's infield dirt was supposed to feature the red clay used in Major League Baseball (MLB) stadiums instead of the black soil used in Koshien Stadium's infield. Ultimately, black dirt was used, and Hanshin Engei, the company in charge of Koshien's ground maintenance, assisted in its upkeep throughout 2016. Red clay did eventually find its way on to the field, however, starting in the 2021 season. After star pitcher Masahiro Tanaka returned to the Eagles that season after playing in MLB, Rakuten converted the mound from its soft black dirt to the hard, red, MLB-style soil preferred by Tanaka. During the 2024–25 offseason, the grass in foul territory and the outfield's warning track were replaced with Mizuno's MS CRAFT artificial turf. Today, Miyagi Stadium is one of only four NPB primary home ballparks to feature a natural grass field.

=== Scoreboard and video board ===
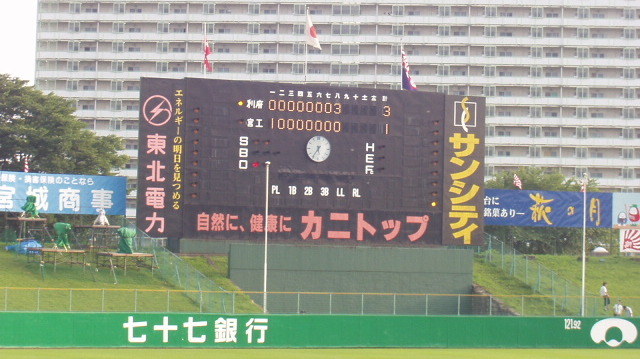
Partially-electric scoreboard in 2004

Miyagi Stadium's first, simple outfield scoreboard only displayed the game's line score. It was demolished and replaced with a larger, partially-electric scoreboard prior to the start of the 1973 season. In addition to the new electric inning-by-inning scoring and indicator lights, the new board featured handwritten batting lineups and umpire listings as well as a clock. This scoreboard was used until 2004, when it was demolished on December 6 during Rakuten's renovation of Miyagi Stadium. The stadium's third scoreboard iteration was installed in March 2005, just before the start of the Eagles' inaugural season. The 25.5 m × 10.5 m (84 ft × 34 ft) board was created by Toshiba and its layout was similar to its predecessor; the lineups and line score, however, were presented via electric display along with the batter's average and pitching speed. New to the scoreboard was an 8 m × 6 m (26 ft × 20 ft) full-color LED screen. Six years later, the center-field scoreboard was renovated for a third and final time; it was converted to a Panasonic full-LED video screen capable of displaying additional team and player statistics.

During the 2009–2010 offseason, an Aurora Vision video board developed by Mitsubishi Electric was installed in right-center field. The 20.6 m × 16.3 m (68 ft × 53 ft) high-definition LED screen is one of the largest in an outdoor stadium in Japan and was seven times larger than the screen embedded on the scoreboard at the time. The screen was erected to the right of the scoreboard to block the view of residents of an apartment building located behind the stadium's right-center field bleachers. Rakuten has since added a branding boarder around the video board, first featuring its Kobo eReader followed by the current Rakuten Mobile branding, to promote its various subsidiaries. The screen was converted to SMD LEDs manufactured by Iris Ohyama in 2026. At the same time, the static advertising board to the left of the screen was converted to a full 6 m × 16.2 m (20 ft × 53 ft) LED display.

=== Smile Glico Park and amusement rides ===
When the newly renovated Miyagi Stadium opened in 2005, Rakuten Mountain, the left-center field seating area, was a grass lawn until a temporary seating section was erected there in 2013. During the 2015–16 offseason, the temporary stands were removed and the area was redeveloped into a "park within a park" to further push Rakuten's "ball park concept". Named Smile Glico Park for sponsor Ezaki Glico, the resulting 4,000 m^{2} (43,000 sq ft) recreation area accommodates approximately 7,000 people and includes amusement attractions and game seating. The highlight of the park is a 16-gondola, 36-metre-tall Ferris wheel from which fans can watch a baseball game. The wheel was purchased and relocated from the closed Sendai Hi-Land amusement park and refurbished for the total cost of ¥200 million. The lights outfitted along its spokes and the circular screen on its center hub allows the wheel to interact with events occurring during a game. A merry-go-round and a playground were added to the park, as well as other temporary attractions such as a climbing wall and a double-decker bus. Fans have access to the amusement area with purchase of a ticket to an Eagles game, however individual tickets to Smile Glico Park are also sold separately and on non-game days. In 2020, a café building in the park was converted into a small, 4-room, Eagles-themed hotel named Rakuten STAY x EAGLES. It is also open to reservations for both game and non-game days.

Rakuten opened a thrill ride at the top of the stands on the third base side in 2018. The ride, dubbed the "Eagle Bridge", consisted of two beams suspended 20 m (66 ft) above the ground, one to walk across and another with a swing affixed to the end. In addition to being available during game days, the attraction was also operated on non-game days when Smile Glico Park was open despite not being located within the Glico Park. Eagle Bridge was dismantled before the 2020 season.

Smile Glico Park and other attractions
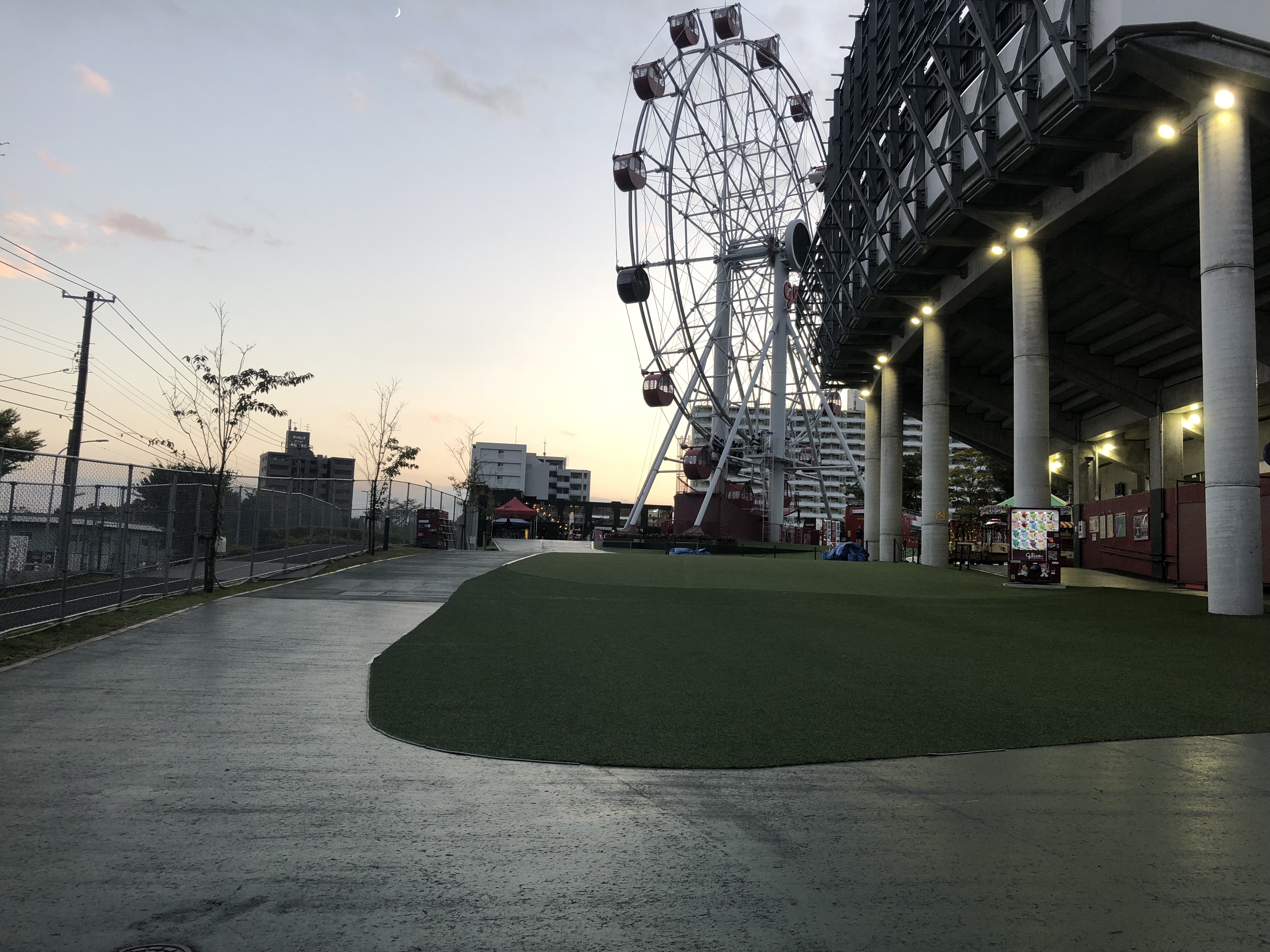
Smile Glico Park entrance plaza

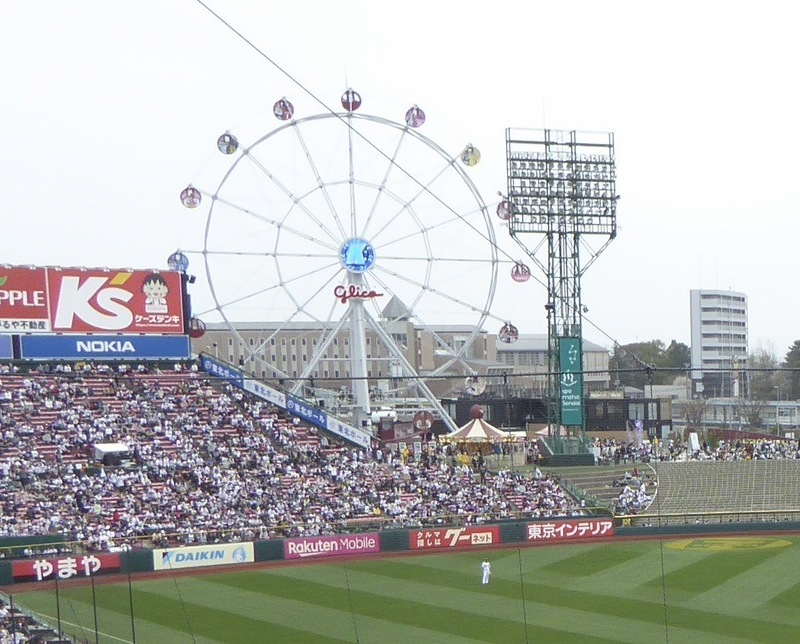
Ferris wheel and merry-go-round

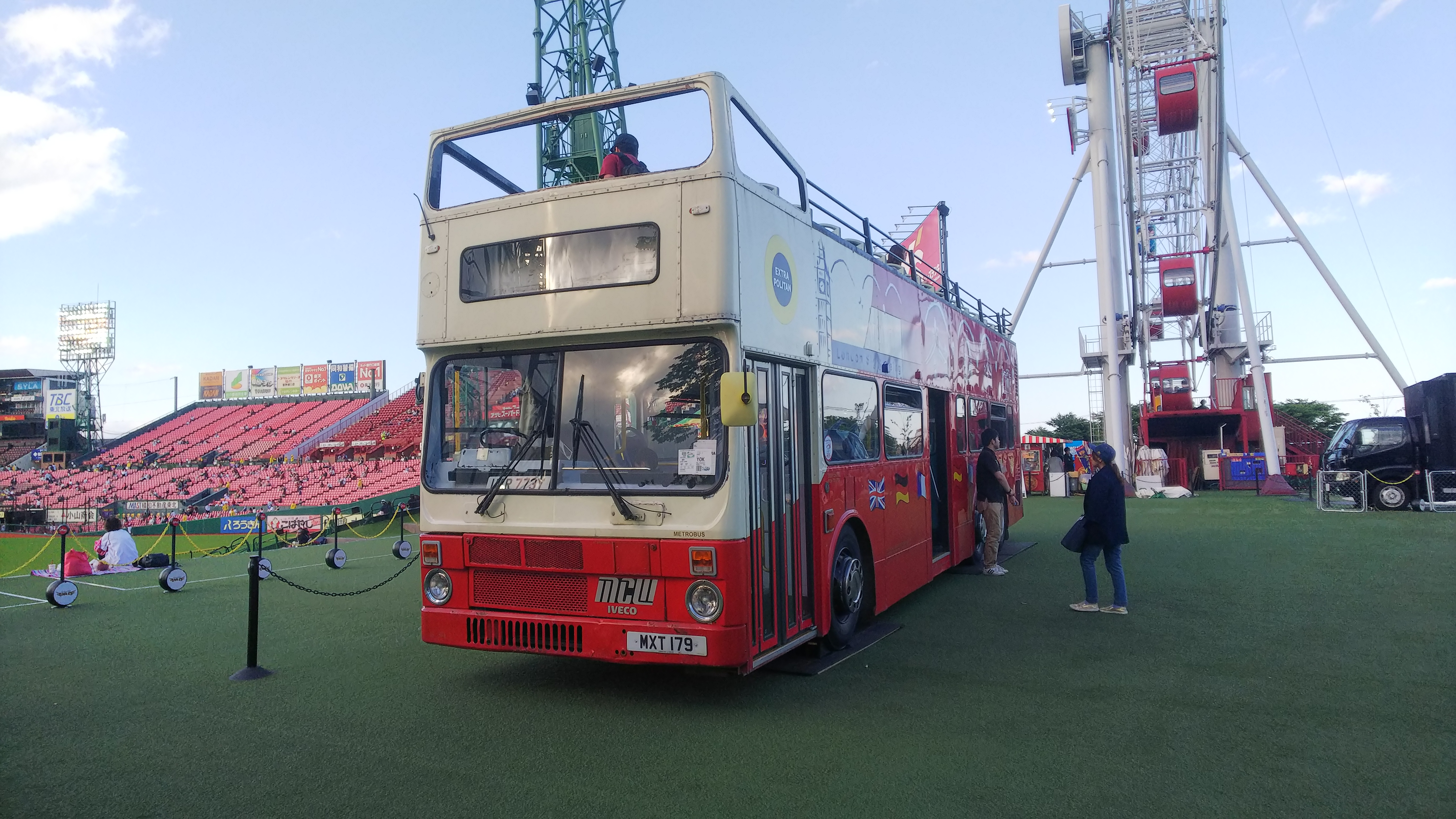
Double-decker bus in 2018

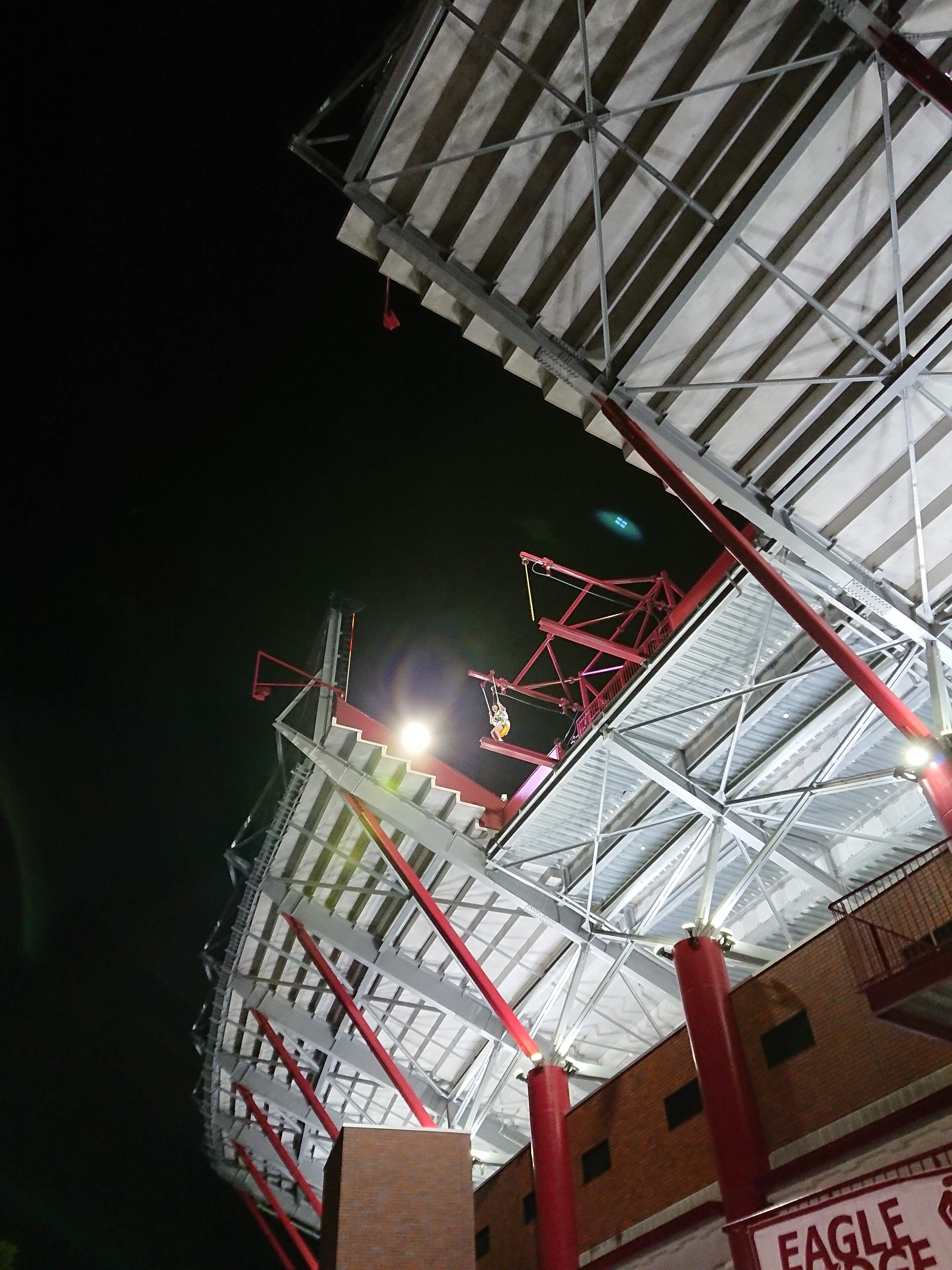
Eagle Bridge in 2018

== Rakuten renovations ==
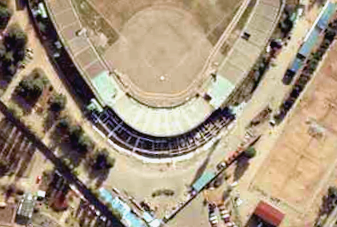
Miyagi Stadium during the partial renovation of its stands in 1984

Miyagi Stadium is the third-oldest of twelve NPB stadiums and the oldest in the Pacific League. Other than the addition of lights in 1973, the stadium's only other significant renovation was the reconstruction of the stands directly behind home plate to include individual seats in 1984. By 2004, the 54-year-old ballpark still featured simple bench seating down the first and third baselines, and the outfield section was a lawn with no formal seating. The playing field had a dirt infield and short distances down the right and left field foul lines to the outfield wall. The outfield scoreboard installed prior to the 1973 season still displayed team batting lineups via old-fashioned panels with players’ names hand-painted on them. Renovations to the aging facility were an important part of the selection process when NPB was in talks with Livedoor and Rakuten to form new teams to be based in Miyagi Stadium. Prior to the selection hearings, professional baseball sent the selection subcommittee to the stadium to assess its state. During the hearings, the two applicants discussed their plans to renovate the infield seating, add outfield seating, increase capacity, upgrade concessions, replace the scoreboard, and extend the foul lines, among other topics. At this time, general contractors Takenaka Corporation and Kajima had also put together proposals to convert Miyagi Stadium into a domed facility costing ¥23.5 billion and ¥10 billion, respectively.

Upon being selected as the new NPB team in November 2004, Rakuten president Hiroshi Mikitani traveled to Miyagi Stadium to sign a basic agreement with Shiro Asano, governor of Miyagi Prefecture, officially securing the ballpark as the Eagles' home field. There, he revealed the redevelopment details alongside an artist's rendition of the stadium post-renovation. Rakuten initially planned to spend approximately ¥3 billion to modernize the stadium in two phases. The first phase would bring the ballpark's seating capacity to 23,000 by the following spring and phase two would increase the capacity to 28,000 by the spring of 2006. Extra seating would be placed in foul territory to bring fans closer to the field and box and VIP seating would be added. Additionally, the first- and third-base foul lines would be extended from 91.4 meters to 99.7 meters, a video screen would be installed on a new fully-electronic scoreboard, and the field would possibly be replaced with artificial turf. Mikitani compared the stadium's new plan to that of a Major League Baseball (MLB) stadium.

=== Modernization (2004–2006) ===
Interior comparison

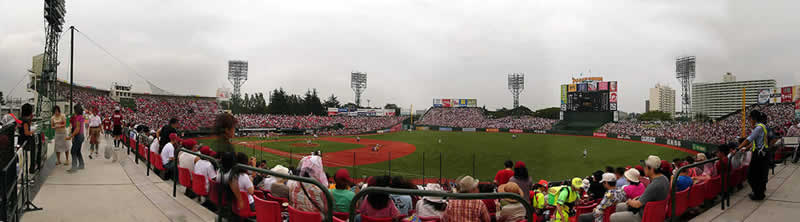
Post phase one, 2005

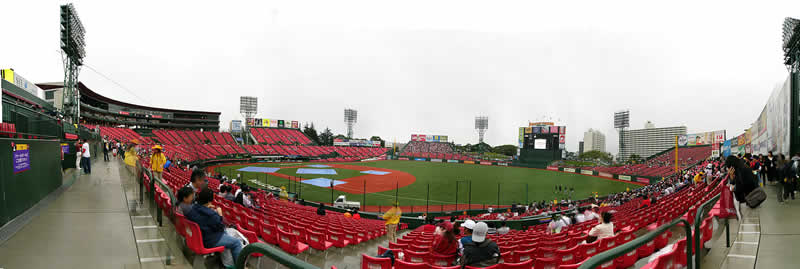
Post phase two, 2006

The first phase of Rakuten's renovation of Miyagi Stadium was completed entirely during the 2004–2005 offseason. Kajima Corporation was hired for the project and demolition started in December, 2004. In the first week of the project, the infield seats were removed and the scoreboard was demolished; a new, fully-electronic board was installed in its place before the start of the season. In addition to replacing all of the infield seats, new seating sections were also constructed. In the infield, two sections that cut into foul territory down the first and third baselines were added. Additionally, an area was dug out behind the backstop and seats were installed to allow for spectators to view the game from a lower perspective. Since the stadium only had lawn seating in the outfield prior to the renovation, new permanent seating needed to be built. On the far left- and right-sides of the outfield, two new sections were constructed, while grass seating was maintained on either side of the new scoreboard. Beyond the left field seating, an 8-metre (26 ft) high mound dubbed "Rakuten Mountain" was created using leftover dirt excavated during construction. The sloped hill connected the area behind the stadium to the grass seating area in left field.

Exterior comparison

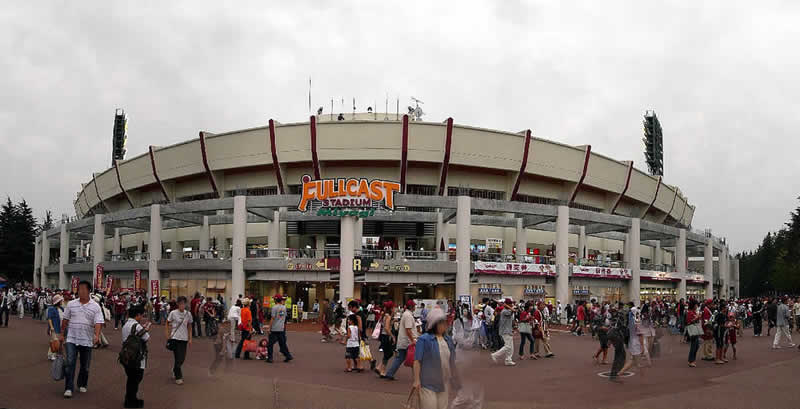
Post phase one, 2005

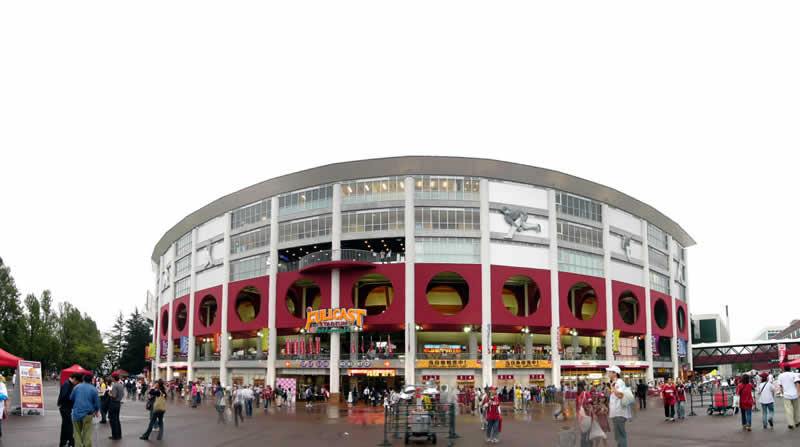
Post phase two, 2006

The front of the stadium was expanded in two phases.

Around the front of the stadium, a large, concrete frame was constructed that expanded the concourses, allowing for restrooms and shops to be upgraded and added. In addition to stadium infrastructure, baseball facilities and amenities were also modified. The baseball field's outfield wings were extended from 91.4 to 101.5 metres (300 to 333 ft), the largest in NPB at the time, and its natural grass was replaced with artificial FieldTurf. A facility housing the pitchers' bullpens was added on the outside of the stadium along its third base side, allowing fans to watch players warm up. Construction concluded on March 20 and the Eagles held their first game at the stadium on April 1, 2005.

Work on the second phase of the project started the following offseason in October 2005. The concrete frame constructed around the front of the stadium during the first phase was expanded upon and completed, resulting in a five-story structure that contained a food court, box seats, the TV and radio booth, the press box, and a premium lounge. Additional infield seating was added via a new section erected atop the building that houses the bullpens on the third base side. Box seats and the "Eagles' Nest", an enclosed lounge with a video screen above it, were built on the first base side. Four other adjoining buildings were built adjacent to the stadium on the first base side. These facilities housed the team's offices and clubhouse, two indoor practice areas, and a parking garage. With phase two concluded, Rakuten had spent ¥7 billion in total on the two-year modernization project.

=== Implementation of the "ball park concept" (2006–present) ===
Prior to the 2007 season, the first ribbon display at a baseball stadium in Japan was added to Miyagi Stadium's backstop. Two more ribbons were added the following season to the outfield seating areas and the right field lawn section was converted to a group seating area that provided tables for groups up to five people. Upgrades continued in 2009 and 2010 when the sunken backstop seats were enclosed to help create the new "Prestige" section, and the large video board was installed in right field, respectively. Renovation plans were halted in 2011 when repairing the damage caused by the 2011 Tōhoku earthquake took precedent.

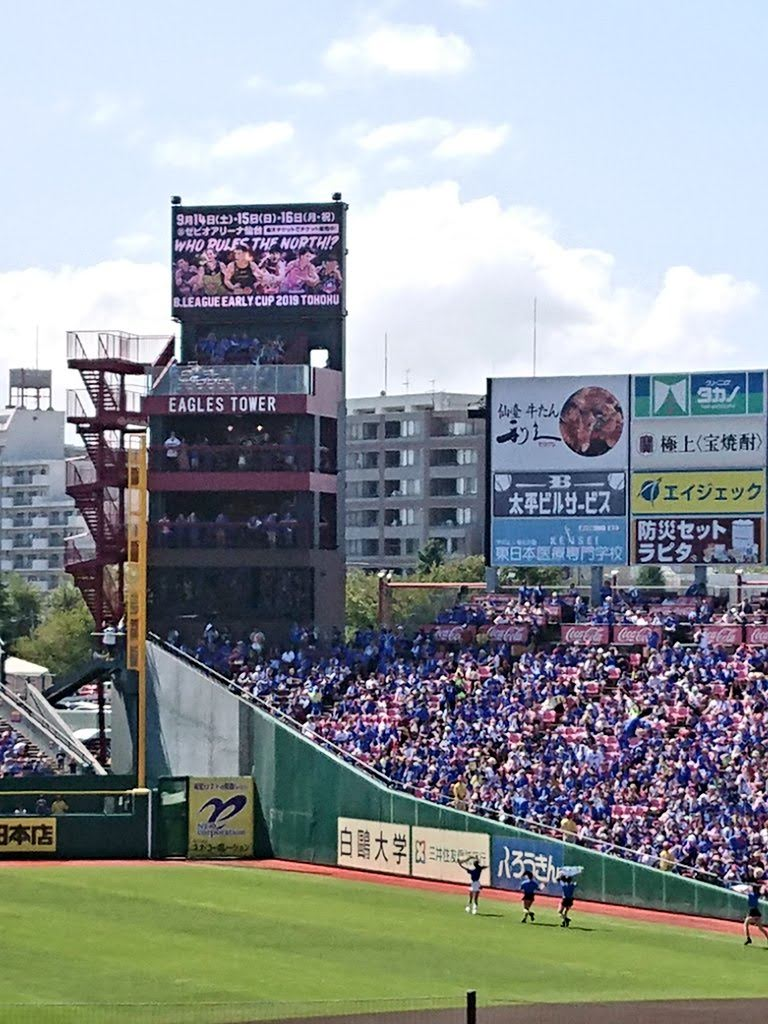
Eagles Tower

Following the 2012 season, Rakuten continued its redevelopment of Miyagi Stadium and again focused on implementing their "ball park concept". The box seats along the first base side were expanded farther toward the outfield and included a party deck. The bigger change, however, came with the addition of the new E-Wing seating sections. These two sections were built in right- and left-center fields protruding from the existing outfield seating. The construction of these seats changed the shape of the outfield and decreased the distances to the wall; both distances down the first and third baselines were reduced from 101.5 to 100.1 metres (333 to 328 ft), and middle left and right fields were shortened from 117 to 116 metres (384 to 381 ft), effectively creating a "lucky zone", the term used to describe moving an outfield wall to make hitting home runs easier. Along with the E-Wings, a new outfield wall was also constructed. This wall was shorter than the previous (2.8 to 2.5 metres (9.2 to 8.2 ft)) and featured padding for outfielder players.

Rakuten removed much of the temporary seating added throughout the year during the Eagles' championship in 2013 and replaced it with a large, permanent seating area along the third base line. In addition to traditional seating, the section also featured seats with tables, box seats, party decks, and standing seats. It was completed in August 2014 and a 6 m × 35 m (20 ft × 115 ft) LED screen was to the top in September. The following offseason, a new entrance gate and standalone Eagles' merchandise store were built in the plaza in front of the stadium and a geodesic dome was erected on its third base side. A restaurant for season ticket holders was also constructed in the ballpark. Additionally, a portion of the right field stands were converted into group box seats and a party deck was created along the third-base line.

The last large-scale renovation of Miyagi Stadium occurred during the 2015–16 offseason. The ¥3 billion project converted the field from artificial turf back to natural grass, updated the scoreboard to a full LED screen, redeveloped the center-left stands into an amusement park, and made minor alterations to several seating sections. Rakuten first began testing the feasibility of maintaining a natural grass field in Sendai's cold climate by collecting data on grass installed on a practice area next to the stadium in 2014. During a major seating alteration in 2019, infield seats near the field were upgraded and private rooms were added along the first base side, and a four-story tower was constructed. The 25 m (82 ft)-tall tower, dubbed "Eagles Tower", sits just beyond the foul pole on the first base side and can hold up to 103 spectators. The ballpark also became cashless that season, instead opting to accept only credit cards, IC cards, Rakuten Pay, and other electronic payment methods in an effort to become a "smart stadium". The following year, the third base side infield seats near the field were upgraded to better match the changes made on the first base side. The upper portion seating was also dramatically changed, with the Eagle Bridge attraction dismantled to help create space for a party deck and 36 boxes.

Miyagi Stadium has continued to receive small improvements since 2020. In 2023, 14 m × 1.5 m (45.9 ft × 4.9 ft) LED screen was installed above the stadium's front entrance. The next year, the 594 high-intensity discharge lamp (HID) bulbs installed in the stadium's six light towers were instead replaced with 480 light-emitting diode (LED) bulbs. The LEDs use 60% less electricity compared to the HID bulbs. Additionally, since LEDs can also be switched on and off instantly, they are also used to produce various lighting effects and patterns not previously possible with HID bulbs. Later that year, Miyagi Prefecture began a crowdfunded hometown tax donation campaign to help renovate the ballpark. With a funding goal of ¥30 million, the donations are planned to be used to renovate the stadium's main entrance and exterior walls, and to install LED lighting in streetlights around the facility.

== Naming rights ==
Miyagi Stadium's name had remained unchanged since it opened in 1950. However, before the start of Rakuten's first season in Miyagi Stadium, the team and the prefecture agreed to sell the naming rights to the stadium to help pay for team management costs. The agreement stipulated that the rights would be renegotiated every three years and the money from the each contract would be split between the team and the prefecture at a three-to-one ratio, respectively. Additionally, any new stadium name must include the word "Miyagi".

=== Fullcast ===
The first contract was awarded to the only bidder, staffing firm Fullcast (now Fullcast Holdings), and in early 2005, the ballpark's name was changed to "Fullcast Stadium Miyagi" for ¥600 million. However, in August 2007, the Tokyo Labor Bureau ordered Fullcast to suspend operations after it found that the company had violated labor law. After this incident, Fullcast's contract was terminated several months early, and its name was removed from the ballpark.

=== Nippon Paper Industries ===
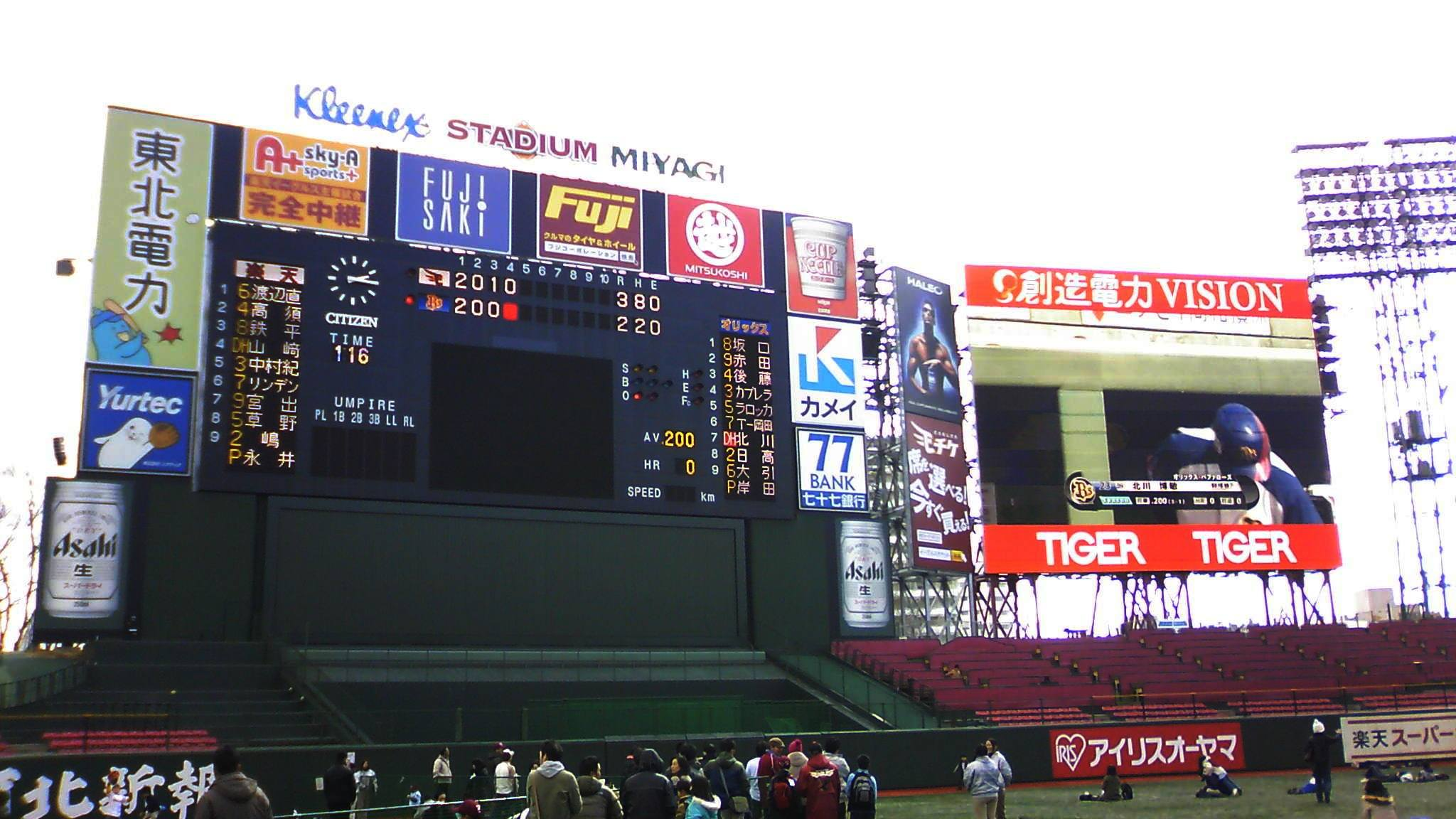
Nippon Paper Industries' Kleenex branding atop the scoreboard in 2010

After Fullcast's contract was cancelled in 2007, Miyagi Prefecture began soliciting applications for a new naming sponsor that same year. Nippon Paper Industries committed to a ¥750 million contract to rename Miyagi Stadium "Nippon Paper Kleenex Stadium Miyagi" beginning on January 1, 2008. However, just before the start of the season, it was revealed that Nippon Paper had misled the public about how much recycled paper was being used in their products. In the wake of the news, the contract wasn't terminated, however, it was agreed that the company's name would be dropped from the stadium leaving "Kleenex Stadium Miyagi".

Near the end of the three-year contract period, all parties agreed to renew for another three years, however the price of the naming rights was lowered to ¥600 million. The company's name was also added back into the stadium's official name, making it "Nippon Paper Kleenex Stadium Miyagi".

=== Rakuten Group ===
In 2013, Nippon Paper decided not to renew its contract to purchase Miyagi Stadium's naming rights for a third time. Two companies applied after the prefecture opened applications, and Rakuten, the baseball team's parent company, was awarded the contract for ¥603 million. The ballpark was named "Rakuten Kobo Stadium Miyagi" from 2014 through 2016 to promote the company's ebook and e-reader subsidiary, Kobo Inc. When Rakuten renewed the contract at the end of 2016, the name was shortened to "Kobo Park Miyagi". The word "park" was inserted into the stadium's name to help convey the team's new "ball park concept" that promoted the facility as not only a place to watch baseball, but also as an entertainment destination for people of all ages.

One year later and in the middle of the contract, Rakuten again changed the stadium's name, the third time in five years. The new name, "Rakuten Seimei Park Miyagi", was chosen to raise the profile of Rakuten's life insurance business, Rakuten Life Insurance. After this, fans became frustrated with the frequency of the changes. Rakuten renewed their contract a third time at the end of 2019 for the same amount as the previous contracts, ¥603 million.

After keeping the name for five years, Rakuten changed the stadium's name again starting in 2023 with their fourth three-year, ¥603 million naming rights contract; the stadium's new name, "Rakuten Mobile Park Miyagi", came from the company's mobile carrier subsidiary Rakuten Mobile. In 2025, Rakuten and Miyagi Prefecture renewed same contract agreement for a fifth time, with Rakuten modifying the name to "Rakuten Mobile Saikyo Park Miyagi", the ballpark's current name.

== Accessibility and transportation ==
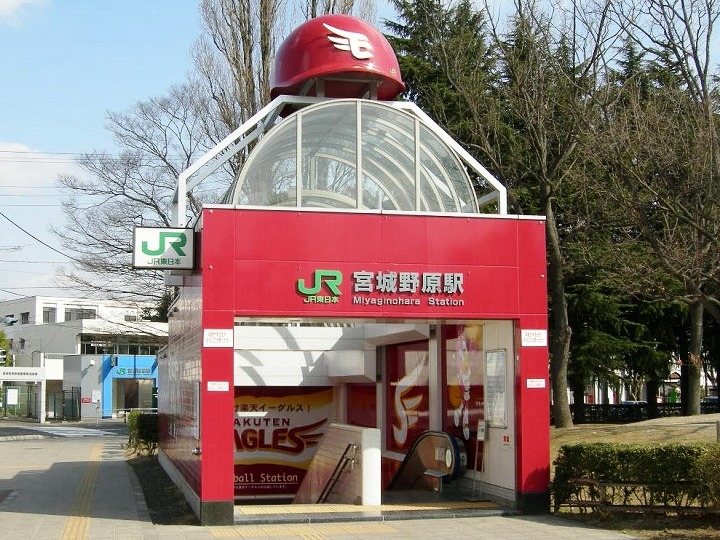
Miyaginohara Station on the Senseki Line is the ballpark's closest train station.

Miyaginohara Station on JR East's Senseki Line is the closest train station to Rakuten Seimei Park. Nicknamed "baseball station", it was repainted crimson red in 2005 to celebrate the founding of the team. Additionally, atop the station's entrance sits a large Eagles helmet and it features images of the team's mascots. From 2010 to 2026, a clip from the team's song "Habatake Rakuten Eagles" was also played as the trains' departure melody. Tsutsujigaoka Station, the next station west of Miyaginohara on the Senseki Line, also brings passengers to within walking distance of the stadium. Sendai Subway's Tōzai Line can also be used to get to Miyagi Stadium, with the line's Yakushido and Rembo Stations both bringing passengers to within a fifteen-minute walk. For fans arriving to Sendai Station via various lines, including the Sendai Subway Namboku Line, the Shinkansen, or the Sendai Airport Line, Rakuten operates a shuttle bus to and from the stadium from the station's east exit bus stop platform 76.

In addition to rail service, several bus options also provide transportation to the stadium. Locally, Rakuten Seimei Park is served by Sendai City Bus routes 230, 233, and 308. Some intercity bus routes operated by JR Bus Tōhoku, Aizu Bus, and Fukushima Transportation throughout the Tōhoku region also provide direct-to-stadium options on game days. For fans not using public transportation, the stadium is accessible by car via the Tōhoku Expressway (E4) on the west and Sendai-Tōbu Road (E6) on the east. The stadium has an on-site and an off-site parking lot as well as on-site parking for bikes and motorcycles.

== See also ==
- Lists of stadiums
- List of stadiums in Japan

Tenants
Preceded by Tokyo Stadium	Home of the Lotte Orions; 1973–1977	Succeeded by Kawasaki Stadium
Preceded by First stadium	Home of the Tohoku Rakuten Golden Eagles; 2005–present	Succeeded by Current stadium
