= Classless Act =

American rock band

- Origin: Los Angeles, CA
- Genres: Hard rock, glam rock
- Years active: 2019–present
- Label: Better Noise
- Members: Derek Day; Griffin Tucker; Dane Pieper; Franco Gravante; Chuck McKissock
- Website: https://classlessact.com/

Classless Act is an American rock band from Los Angeles. The band is notable for opening for Def Leppard and Mötley Crüe on The Stadium Tour in 2022.

== Biography ==
Classless Act has existed in various different lineups since 2016, with the current incarnation coming together in 2019. The band was formed by drummer London Hudson, and guitarist Niko Tsangaris, both of whom have since left the group. The band's debut single "Give It To Me" was released in 2021. Classless Act was announced as the opening act for The Stadium Tour on July 9, 2021 replacing Tuk Smith and The Restless Hearts. Their debut album Welcome to the Show was released on June 24, 2022. The album was produced by Bob Rock, Keith Nelson, Joe Chiccarelli and Franco Gravante and was recorded at the home studio of Tommy Lee and Sunset Sound. Lee also recommended the band as the opener for the tour. The album featured guest appearances by Vince Neil, Justin Hawkins, and Keith Nelson. Lead singer Derek Day performed the Mötley Crüe songs "Live Wire" and "Home Sweet Home" at the Taylor Hawkins Tribute Concert at the Kia Forum in Inglewood, California on September 27, 2022, alongside Lee, Nikki Sixx, and Dave Grohl.

== Members ==
=== Current members ===
- Derek Day – lead vocals, guitar, keyboard
- Griffin Tucker – lead guitar, vocals, drums, piano
- Dane Pieper – rhythm guitar, vocals
- Franco Gravante – bass, vocals, guitar, keyboard, piano
- Chuck McKissock – drums, bass, vocals

== Discography ==
- Welcome to the Show (2022)
- Welcome to the Acoustic Show (EP) (2022)

=== Singles ===
Title	Year	Peak chart positions	Album
Title	Year	US Main	Album
"Classless Act" (feat. Vince Neil)	2020	33	Welcome To the Show
