= Tokyo Stadium (baseball) =

Baseball stadium in Arakawa, Tokyo, Japan

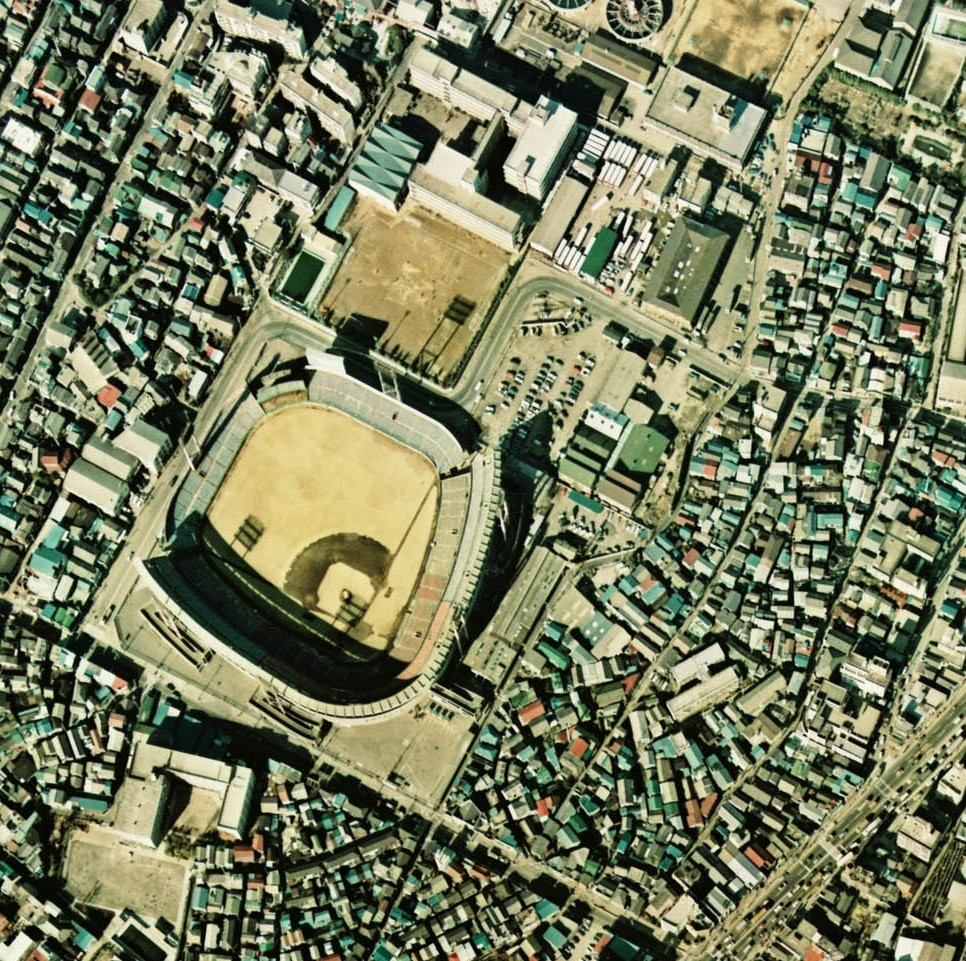
- Location: 7-1, Minami-Senju (Present: 45-1, Minami-Senju Rokuchome), Arakawa, Tokyo, Japan
- Coordinates: 35°44′10″N 139°47′31″E
- Owner: Tokyo Stadium Co.
- Operator: Tokyo Stadium Co.

Construction
- Opened: May 31, 1962
- Closed: 1972
- Demolished: 1977
- Architect: Takenaka Corporation

Tokyo Stadium (東京スタジアム) was a baseball stadium in Arakawa, Tokyo, Japan. It was the home of the Lotte Orions until they moved to Miyagi Baseball Stadium in Sendai in 1972. The stadium was opened in 1962 and had a capacity of 35,000 people.

== History ==
In 1960, despite the Daimai Orions having won the Pacific League pennant in 1950 and 1960, and having won the Japan Series in the former year. they were getting tired of low attendance figures at Korakuen Stadium. They, at the time, were sharing the stadium with the Yomiuri Giants and Kokutetsu Swallows, who drew much larger crowds. For instance, Giants games regularly sold out, with the smallest attendance figure that year still being a solid 15,000, a weekday game against the Chunichi Dragons. Swallows games would draw a healthy 20,000 people, and would often sell out if the starting pitcher that day was Masaichi Kaneda. The Orions, despite winning the 1960 Pacific League pennant, only drew around 10,000 fans on good conditioned days. In fact, scheduling also favored the Giants and Swallows, relegating the Orions to play on weekdays, if they weren't moved to Kawasaki Stadium to also play second fiddle to the Taiyo Whales. With this, Daiei Film president Masaichi Nagata set out to build a stadium that would surpass Korakuen Stadium.

The land the stadium was set to be built was a site of a former silk factory in Arakawa. Nagata would buy the land for ¥1 billion (or $2.8 million in 1960), then poured another ¥2 billion into construction. Construction began in 1961, and was completed in May the following year, opening on June 2, 1962, with every Pacific League team attending. Nagata closed the ceremony by saying to "please love the Pacific League." The Orions would win their first game there the same night, a 9-5 victory over the Nankai Hawks. Both would play a doubleheader the next day, which had a solid attendance figure, 18,000 in the first game, 20,000 for the second, both Orions wins. In fact, things were looking so good, that the Orions refused to entertain the idea of renting the stadium out, something that would be a grave mistake later on, with Nagata being adamant that this stadium was his, and for his company's team, so much so, he changed the name of his team to the Tokyo Orions in 1964. In fact, teams like the Toei Flyers and the Swallows would only use the stadium if their home, Meiji Jingu Stadium, was being used by others, such as the university league Tokyo Big6 Baseball League, or if at that point in the season, the teams were just playing a dead rubber game.

The downfall of the stadium began by 1964, when Opening Day only drew 5,000 people. In fact, the Pacific League, thanks to the rise of television, and the fact 2 media giants owned teams in Central League, was facing a downturn in popularity, combined with the rise of the Giants V9 dynasty. This was worsened by the fact that the declining movie and film industry in Japan caused Daiei Film to lose money, heavily combined with the fact Nagata spent ¥3 billion in the stadium as this decline was looming. The stadium's massive lights were also expensive, combined with the fact Japan's electricity at the time was mostly from fossil fuels, and that the Fukushima Daiichi Nuclear Power Plant had just began construction and wouldn't be complete for another 7 years. The aforementioned hubris of Nagata that the stadium was only meant for the Orions meant they were losing out on revenue. The final blow came with the infamous Black Mist Scandal of 1969 and 1970, where ace Fumio Narita was suspended for a month, but by then the team was sold to Lotte, and attendance wasn't getting better, only drawing an average of 8,500 fans despite winning the PL pennant that year, not even selling out a single game that year, only getting close when they clinched the pennant against the Nishitetsu Lions, when attendance recorded was 26,000. The 4 games after that got attendances as low as 800. In fact, aside from games played during the Japan Series, the only even that sold out that year was a wrestling event featuring former Giants pitcher Shohei Baba. The Orions would lose that Japan Series to the Giants, but the majority in attendance were Giants fans, which infuriated Lotte. So after that, they entered a deal to play a 2/3rd of their games in Sendai at Miyagi Baseball Stadium, with the rest being split between Korakuen and Kawasaki. After that, no one wanted to move in there, as the Swallows and Toei Flyers were fine with their venues, and so it sat for 5 years before being demolished in 1977 to build a multi-purpose facility for Arakawa citizens.

== Features ==
Taking overall design inspiration from Candlestick Park in San Francisco and Comiskey Park in South Side Chicago, the stadium was given a more open air feel, with the concourses being out in the open, rather than fully enclosed. It wasn't as big as Korakuen, with a maximum capacity of theoretically 35,000, but lowered to 30,700 to abide by fire safety ordinances. Despite the lower capacity, it was far more luxurious, with seats being wider and made of fibre-reinforced plastic, so they wouldn't easily get hot. They also had larger fan concourses, and Japan's first luxury boxes in stadiums. 4 were meant for larger parties, and 1 for VIPs, intent on trying to get the Imperial House of Japan to watch an NPB game, like had happened in Korakuen in 1959. The luxuries extended to even players, as clubhouses were much larger than Korakuen. Catcher Takeo Daigo, in particular, stated that in any other stadium, he couldn't change without bumping into other players. In Tokyo Stadium, he could spin in his chair with his legs out and he wouldn't bump into someone. In fact, when George Altman joined in 1968, they bought a mini fridge and put it in between their lockers. it also featured a feature in most NPB stadiums today, indoor bullpens, and also featured the first infield grass in NPB. It was also the first stadium to be built with light towers as part of the design, rather than them being added later, giving it the nickname "The Stadium of Light" by the media.

The stadium had some downsides, such as it being narrow due to dimensions in the property. Center field was the standard 120 meters (393 feet), but left and right field was 90 meters (295 feet), not helped by the fact the walls weren't high. Said walls were made of concrete with no padding, instead of wood. It took 4 years for this to cause injury, with pads being added after that. The scoreboard was also smaller compared to other stadiums, so any names with complex Kanji characters would have to be transcribed in Katakana to be easily deciphered from distances. The overall location was also a major downside, as it was located in a working-class neighborhood, so it had great train access, but navigation in the streets when crowds were sold out weren't ideal.

Preceded by Korakuen Stadium	Home of the Lotte Orions; 1962 – 1972	Succeeded by Miyagi Stadium
