= Petco Park =

Baseball park in San Diego, California, US

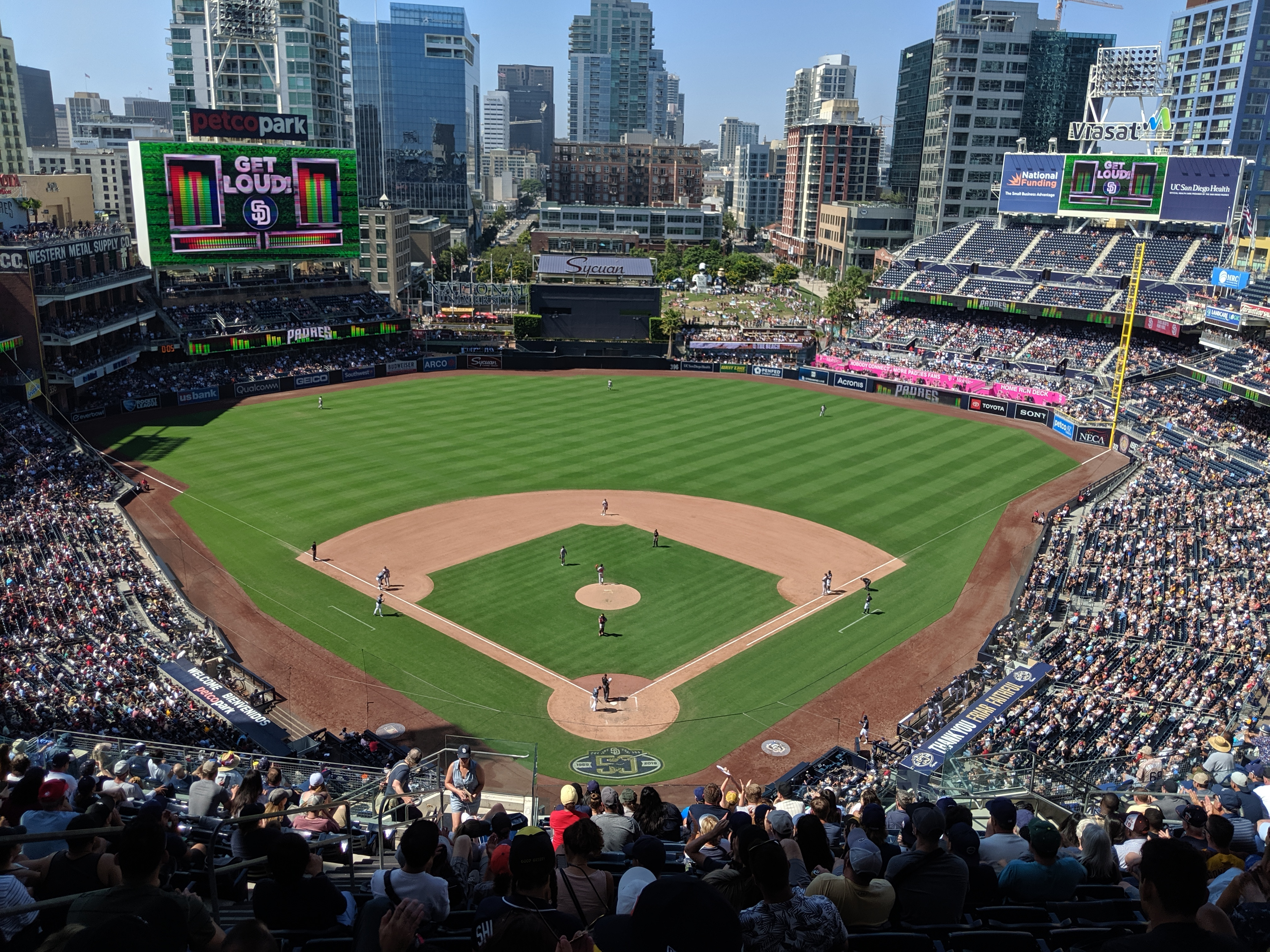
- Petco Park in 2019

- Location in San Diego Location in California Location in the United States
- Address: 100 Park Blvd
- Location: San Diego, California, U.S.
- Coordinates: 32.7073°N 117.1566°W
- Owner: City of San Diego: 70% San Diego Padres: 30%
- Operator: Padres LP
- Capacity: 39,860 (since 2024); 39,909 (2022–2023); 40,019 (2020–2021); 40,204 (2019); 40,209 (2017–2018); 40,162 (2016); 41,164 (2015); 42,302 (2014); 42,524 (2013); 42,691 (2008–2012); 42,445 (2004–2007)
- Executive suites: 75
- Surface: BullsEye Bermuda (Grass)
- Record attendance: Baseball: 47,773 (Oct 9, 2024)
- Field size: Left field Line – 336 feet (102 m); Left field – 343 feet (105 m); Left field alley – 386 feet (118 m); Center field – 396 feet (121 m); Right field alley – 391 feet (119 m); Right field – 382 feet (116 m); Right field line – 331 feet (101 m)
- Public transit: 12th & Imperial; Gaslamp Quarter

Construction
- Groundbreaking: May 3, 2000
- Opened: April 8, 2004
- Cost: US$450 million ($767 million in 2025 Dollars)
- Architects: Populous (then HOK Sport); Antoine Predock (design); Spurlock Poirier (landscape); ROMA (urban planning); Heritage Architecture & Planning (Historic Preservation)
- Project managers: JMI Sports, LLC.
- Structural engineer: Thornton Tomasetti
- Services engineers: M–E Engineers, Inc.
- General contractors: San Diego BallPark Builders (a joint venture of Clark Construction, LLC, Nielsen Dillingham Builders Inc. and Douglas E. Barnhart Inc.)

Tenant
- San Diego Padres (MLB) (2004–present)

Website
- petcoparkevents.com

Petco Park is a ballpark in San Diego, California. It is the home of the San Diego Padres of Major League Baseball (MLB). The ballpark is located in the East Village neighborhood of downtown San Diego, adjacent to the Gaslamp Quarter. Petco Park opened in 2004, replacing San Diego Stadium as the Padres' home venue, where the team played from their inception in 1969 to 2003.

On April 8, 2004, the Padres played their first game at the ballpark, defeating the San Francisco Giants 4–3 in ten innings. Petco Park hosted the inaugural 2006 World Baseball Classic championship and the 2016 MLB All-Star Game. On October 9, 2024, Petco Park achieved an attendance record for baseball during a game against the Los Angeles Dodgers, with 47,773 people in attendance.

Petco Park features unique design elements, particularly the Western Metal Supply Co. building, a historic warehouse incorporated into the ballpark; its southeast corner serves as the left field foul pole. Gallagher Square, located beyond the outfield wall, includes a community park and viewing terrace, among other features open to the public during stadium off-hours.

== History ==
=== Construction ===
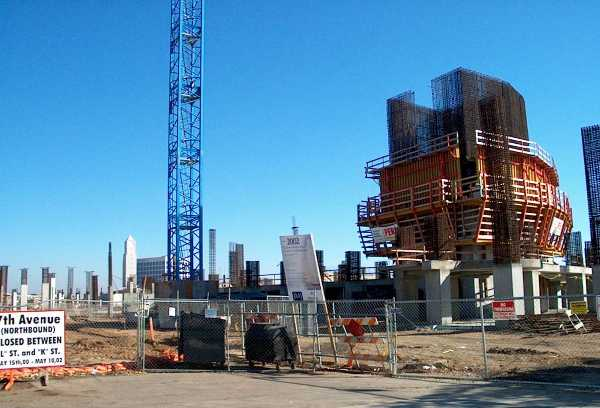
Petco Park under construction in 2001

The ballpark was constructed by San Diego Ballpark Builders, a partnership with Clark Construction, ROEL Construction and Douglas E. Barnhart, Inc. The construction cost of more than $450 million was partially funded by a public–private partnership which included the Center City Development Corporation and the San Diego Redevelopment Agency. The stadium was intended to be part of a comprehensive plan to revitalize San Diego's aging downtown, particularly the East Village area. The stadium is across Harbor Drive from the San Diego Convention Center, and its main entrance behind home plate is two blocks from the downtown terminal of the San Diego Trolley light rail system.

The ballpark was scheduled to open for the 2002 season; however, construction was suspended temporarily for legal and political reasons. Part of this was a court decision, which nullified an already passed ballot proposition approving the city's portion of the stadium financing package and required the proposition be put to voters a second time. Construction encountered a further delay regarding the Western Metal Supply Co. building, which was a historic landmark. After negotiations with the preservation community, the builders agreed to rehabilitate the building in accordance with the Secretary of the Interior's standards, and the building was renovated and included in the stadium design in an example of adaptive reuse.

The resulting delays required the Padres to play the 2002 and 2003 seasons at Qualcomm Stadium.

=== Location ===
The southern side of the stadium is bounded by San Diego Trolley light rail tracks along the north side of Harbor Drive, which serve the adjacent San Diego Convention Center. The portion of K Street between Seventh and 10th is closed to automobiles and serves as a pedestrian promenade along the back of the left and center field outfield seating and also provides access to Gallagher Square behind center field.

Two of the stadium's outfield entrance areas are located at K Street's intersections with Seventh and 10th avenues. The main entrance, behind home plate, is at the south end of Park Boulevard (at Imperial) and faces the San Diego Trolley station 12th & Imperial Transit Center. The ballpark is also located approximately 1 mile (1.6 km) away from Santa Fe Depot station, which is served by Amtrak's Pacific Surfliner, and NCTD's Coaster commuter rail service.

A planned Downtown Station along Harbor Drive between 1st and 5th Avenues would bring the Coaster closer to the ballpark than the existing Santa Fe Depot station. The new platform is expected to open in late 2027 or early 2028.

=== Naming rights ===
San Diego–based pet supplies retailer Petco originally bought naming rights to the stadium in 2004 for $60 million in a 22-year deal. In 2021, Petco signed a new deal with the Padres that ensured the stadium would be named Petco Park through at least 2027. This extension also helped start some other initiatives for Petco and the stadium. Petco's new logo has appeared on new digital signage throughout the park. Following the deal, Petco has also entered a strategic partnership with Manny Machado and Fernando Tatis Jr. to promote the wellbeing of pets and their owners. Petco will also be collaborating with players on social and other digital media to promote pet health.

=== Baseball milestones ===
The first baseball game was played at Petco Park on March 11, 2004. It was part of a four-team NCAA invitational tournament hosted by San Diego State University. The San Diego State Aztecs baseball team, of which retired Padres player Tony Gwynn was the head coach, defeated Houston. It remains the largest attended game in college baseball history. Lance Zawadzki recorded the first hit, when he hit a double. Rielly Embrey hit the first home run in the 5th inning of the same game. On April 8, 2004, the Padres played their first regular season game at Petco Park and defeated the San Francisco Giants 4–3 in 10 innings. On April 15, 2004, Mark Loretta hit the first Padre home run off of Hideo Nomo of the Los Angeles Dodgers. It was caught by Mike Hill, a bartender at the Kansas City Barbecue.

The stadium's first playoff game was played on October 8, 2005. The St. Louis Cardinals beat the Padres, 7–4, to finish off the three-game sweep of the 2005 NLDS.

On March 18 and 20, 2006, the ballpark hosted the semifinals and finals of the first World Baseball Classic. It also hosted second-round games of the 2009 World Baseball Classic. On April 4, 2006, Petco Park had its first rainout, postponing a Padres evening game against the San Francisco Giants.

On August 4, 2007, Barry Bonds hit his 755th home run to tie Hank Aaron's record.

On April 17, 2008, the Padres and Rockies played in a 22-inning game. It was the longest MLB game in nearly 15 years. The game lasted for 22 innings and went on for 6 hours and 16 minutes, ending at 1:21 am in a 2–1 win for the Colorado Rockies. The game featured a stretch of 13 scoreless innings. As of 2023, this remains the longest game in Petco Park's history.

On July 2, 2009, the park was the site of the first MLB game delayed by a swarm of bees. In a game between the Padres and the Houston Astros, a small swarm of honeybees took up residence around a chair in left field, causing the game to be delayed by 52 minutes. A beekeeper was called in and the swarm was exterminated. The Astros won that game, 7–2.

On June 14, 2010, during a Toronto Blue Jays vs. San Diego Padres game, there was a magnitude-5.7 earthquake, which was centered about 85 miles (137 km) east of San Diego. Play stopped momentarily in the eighth inning. The Blue Jays went on to win 6–3.

Rain delays led to the suspension of the Padres' game with the Los Angeles Dodgers on April 8, 2011. The first delay caused the game to start 28 minutes late. Play then was stopped for more than 90 minutes in the second inning and again in the sixth inning for more than an hour. The score was tied at 2–2 in the top of the ninth inning when play was suspended at 1:40 a.m. PDT April 9. After a fourth rain delay, the game was finished April 9, with the Dodgers winning in 11 innings, 4–2.

On April 30, 2012, Milwaukee Brewers outfielder Ryan Braun became the first player to hit three home runs in one game at the park. Braun finished the game 4–5 with three home runs and a triple.

On July 13, 2013, Tim Lincecum threw the park's first no-hitter for the visiting San Francisco Giants as they defeated the Padres, 9–0.

The park hosted the 2016 MLB All-Star Game.

In 2017, Petco Park played host to Pool F of the 2017 World Baseball Classic, in which host USA and undefeated Puerto Rico advanced to the semi-finals.

For the 2020 MLB postseason, the park was one of two stadiums (along with Dodger Stadium) to host neutral-site games of the ALDS, and was also the only stadium to host neutral-site games of the ALCS.

Eduardo Escobar of the New York Mets was the first player to hit for the cycle in the history of Petco Park on June 6, 2022. Later that year, the Padres made it to the postseason as the 5th wild card seed with an 89–73 record. Petco Park hosted its very first postseason game featuring the Padres with fans in attendance in 16 years, as they squared off against the 111-win division rival Los Angeles Dodgers in game 3 of the NLDS. The San Diego Padres would go on to win the series 3–1. On October 18, 2022, Kyle Schwarber of the Philadelphia Phillies hit the longest home run ever recorded at Petco Park at 488 feet in game one of the NLCS.

On May 11, 2024, Petco Park achieved an attendance record for baseball during a game against the Los Angeles Dodgers; the team cited 46,701 people in attendance. The record was beaten shortly after on July 5, in a game against the Arizona Diamondbacks, with 47,171 people in attendance. The record was beaten once again on July 30 against the Los Angeles Dodgers with a walk-off win in front of a crowd of 47,559.

== Notable events ==
=== Other sports ===
==== Rugby ====
In February 2007, Petco Park became the new host of the USA Sevens, a rugby union sevens event within the IRB Sevens World Series. Previous editions of the USA Sevens had been held at Home Depot Center in the Greater Los Angeles suburb of Carson. After the 2009 edition, the event moved to Las Vegas.

==== Tennis ====
From January 31 through February 2, 2014, Petco Park's left-center field temporarily was converted into a red clay tennis court for the Davis Cup tie between United States and Great Britain.

==== Motor sports ====
In January 2015, Petco Park hosted rounds of Monster Jam and AMA Supercross Championship, as a replacement for Qualcomm Stadium.

==== Golf ====
Since 2015, Petco Park has partnered with Callaway Golf Company to open a par-3 nine-hole golf course within the stadium the first week of each November. The holes are built within the outfield while many of the tees are in the upper decks of the stadium.

==== Basketball ====
On December 7, 2015, Petco Park hosted its first college basketball game between the San Diego Toreros and the San Diego State Aztecs as part of the Bill Walton Basketball Festival held in San Diego.

| Date | Opponent | Score | Home | Attendance |
|---|---|---|---|---|
| December 6, 2015 | San Diego State | 48-53 | San Diego | 10,086 |

==== Football ====
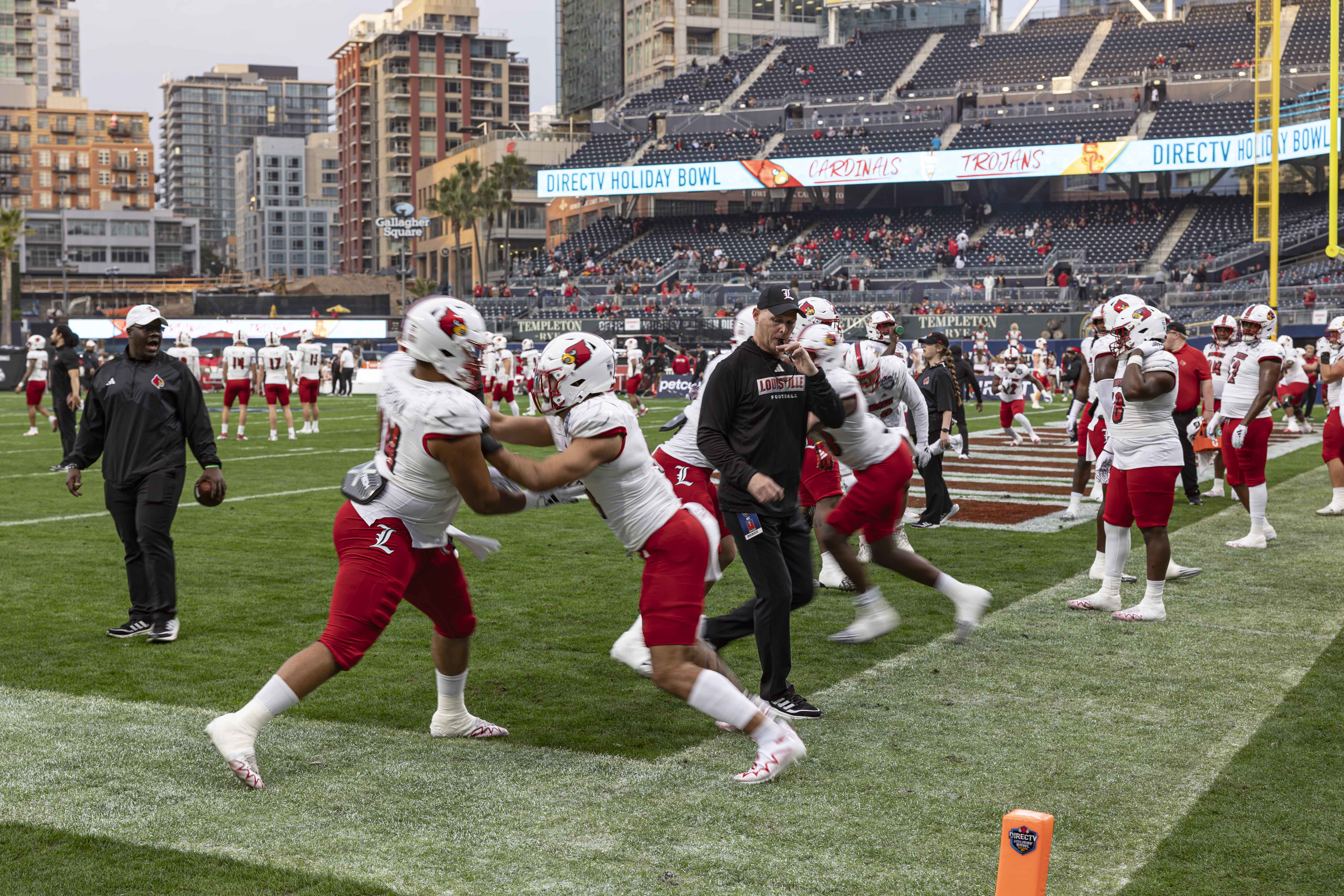
The Louisville Cardinals football team on the field at Petco Park before the 2023 Holiday Bowl

On January 25, 2017, following the relocation of the Chargers NFL franchise to Los Angeles, it was announced that exploratory discussions were taking place regarding the possibility of playing the Holiday Bowl at Petco Park in future years. On June 24, 2021, the Padres announced a partnership with the San Diego Bowl Game Association for the Holiday Bowl to take place at Petco Park for a minimum of the next five years. The first Holiday Bowl at Petco Park would have taken place on December 28, 2021, between the UCLA Bruins and NC State Wolfpack. Hours before kickoff, UCLA withdrew due to positive COVID tests and the game was cancelled. The 2022 Holiday Bowl was played as scheduled. On June 11, 2024, it was announced that the Holiday Bowl would be moving from Petco Park to Snapdragon Stadium.

===== Holiday Bowl results =====
Rankings are based on the AP poll prior to the game being played.

| Date Played | Winning team | | Losing team | | Attnd. | Notes |
|---|---|---|---|---|---|---|
| December 28, 2021 | Canceled due to COVID-19 protocols | | | | — | |
| December 28, 2022 | #15 Oregon | 28 | North Carolina | 27 | 36,242 | notes |
| December 27, 2023 | USC | 42 | #16 Louisville | 28 | 35,317 | notes |

==== Rodeo ====
The inaugural San Diego Rodeo was held at Petco Park on January 12–14, 2024. The second San Diego Rodeo will return on January 10–12, 2025.

=== Concerts ===
| Date | Artist | Opening act(s) | Tour / Concert name | Attendance | Revenue | Notes |
|---|---|---|---|---|---|---|
| November 11, 2005 | The Rolling Stones | Toots and the Maytals | A Bigger Bang | 42,000 | $5,956,083 | First concert at Petco Park. |
| November 4, 2008 | Madonna | Paul Oakenfold | Sticky & Sweet Tour | 35,743 / 35,743 | $5,097,515 | First Madonna tour to San Diego since The Virgin Tour in 1985. |
| October 28, 2011 | Avicii; Deadmau5 | — | — | — | — | |
| September 28, 2014 | Paul McCartney | — | Out There Tour | 45,352 / 45,352 | $4,968,567 | First performance in San Diego since Wings at the San Diego Sports Arena in 1976. |
| May 24, 2015 | The Rolling Stones | Gary Clark Jr. | Zip Code Tour | 40,944 / 40,944 | $8,465,082 | |
| August 29, 2015 | Taylor Swift | Vance Joy; Shawn Mendes | The 1989 World Tour | 44,710 / 44,710 | $5,475,237 | OMI and Avril Lavigne were special guests. |
| May 14, 2016 | Billy Joel | — | Billy Joel in Concert | 42,322 / 42,322 | $4,778,636 | |
| August 6, 2017 | Metallica | Avenged Sevenfold; Gojira; Mix Master Mike | WorldWired Tour | 43,491 / 43,491 | $4,846,411 | |
| September 22, 2018 | Eagles | Zac Brown Band; The Doobie Brothers | An Evening With The Eagles 2018 | — | — | |
| September 23, 2018 | Def Leppard; Journey | Cheap Trick | Def Leppard & Journey 2018 Tour | 34,300 / 37,999 | $2,526,226 | |
| June 22, 2019 | Paul McCartney | — | Freshen Up | 40,224 / 40,224 | $6,017,239 | |
| May 29, 2021 | The Beach Boys | — | — | — | — | John Stamos and Mark McGrath were special guests. |
| May 30, 2021 | Ziggy Marley | — | — | — | — | Tribute to Ziggy's father Bob Marley. |
| August 29, 2021 | Green Day; Fall Out Boy; Weezer | The Interrupters | Hella Mega Tour | 33,961 / 34,060 | $3,378,181 | Originally set for July 24, 2020; changed to July 18, 2021. |
| March 5, 2022 | Garth Brooks | — | The Garth Brooks Stadium Tour | 50,000 / 50,000 | — | |
| July 27, 2022 | Red Hot Chili Peppers | Haim; Thundercat | 2022 Global Stadium Tour | 38,788 / 38,788 | $5,985,732 | |
| August 27, 2022 | Grupo Firme | — | Enfiestados y Amanecidos Stadium Tour 2022 | — | — | |
| August 28, 2022 | Def Leppard; Mötley Crüe | Poison; Joan Jett & the Blackhearts; Tuk Smith and The Restless Hearts | The Stadium Tour | — | — | Originally set for July 23, 2020; changed to September 12, 2021. |
| September 17, 2022 | Bad Bunny | Alesso | World's Hottest Tour | — | $20,038,705 | First act to perform two sold-out shows and back to back nights and the first headlining Latin artist to perform here. |
| September 18, 2022 | Bad Bunny | Diplo | World's Hottest Tour | — | $20,038,705 | First act to perform two sold-out shows and back to back nights and the first headlining Latin artist to perform here. |
| November 9, 2022 | Elton John | — | Farewell Yellow Brick Road Tour | 38,828 / 38,828 | $8,842,163 | Final San Diego performance ever. |
| July 14, 2023 | Morgan Wallen | HARDY; ERNEST; Bailey Zimmerman | One Night At A Time World Tour | — | — | |
| July 15, 2023 | Morgan Wallen | HARDY; ERNEST; Bailey Zimmerman | One Night At A Time World Tour | — | — | |
| July 16, 2023 | Slightly Stoopid; Sublime with Rome | Atmosphere; The Movement | Summertime 2023 Tour | — | — | |
| June 30, 2024 | Blink-182 | Pierce the Veil; Hot Milk | One More Time... Tour | — | — | |
| August 7, 2024 | Foo Fighters | The Hives; Alex G | Everything or Nothing at All Tour | — | — | |
| August 30, 2024 | Def Leppard; Journey | Steve Miller Band | The Summer Stadium Tour | — | — | |
| September 11, 2024 | Pink | Sheryl Crow; KidCutUp; The Script | P!NK: Summer Carnival | — | — | |
| September 28, 2024 | Green Day | The Smashing Pumpkins; Rancid; The Linda Lindas | The Saviors Tour | — | — | |
| September 17, 2025 | Chris Brown | Summer Walker; Bryson Tiller | Breezy Bowl XX | — | — | |
| August 17, 2026 | Noah Kahan | Gigi Perez Annabelle Dinda | The Great Divide Tour | — | — | |
| May 25, 2027 | Stray Kids | | Run It World Tour | | | |

=== Other events ===
Season 11 auditions for the singing reality-television program American Idol were held Friday, July 8, 2011, at Petco Park.

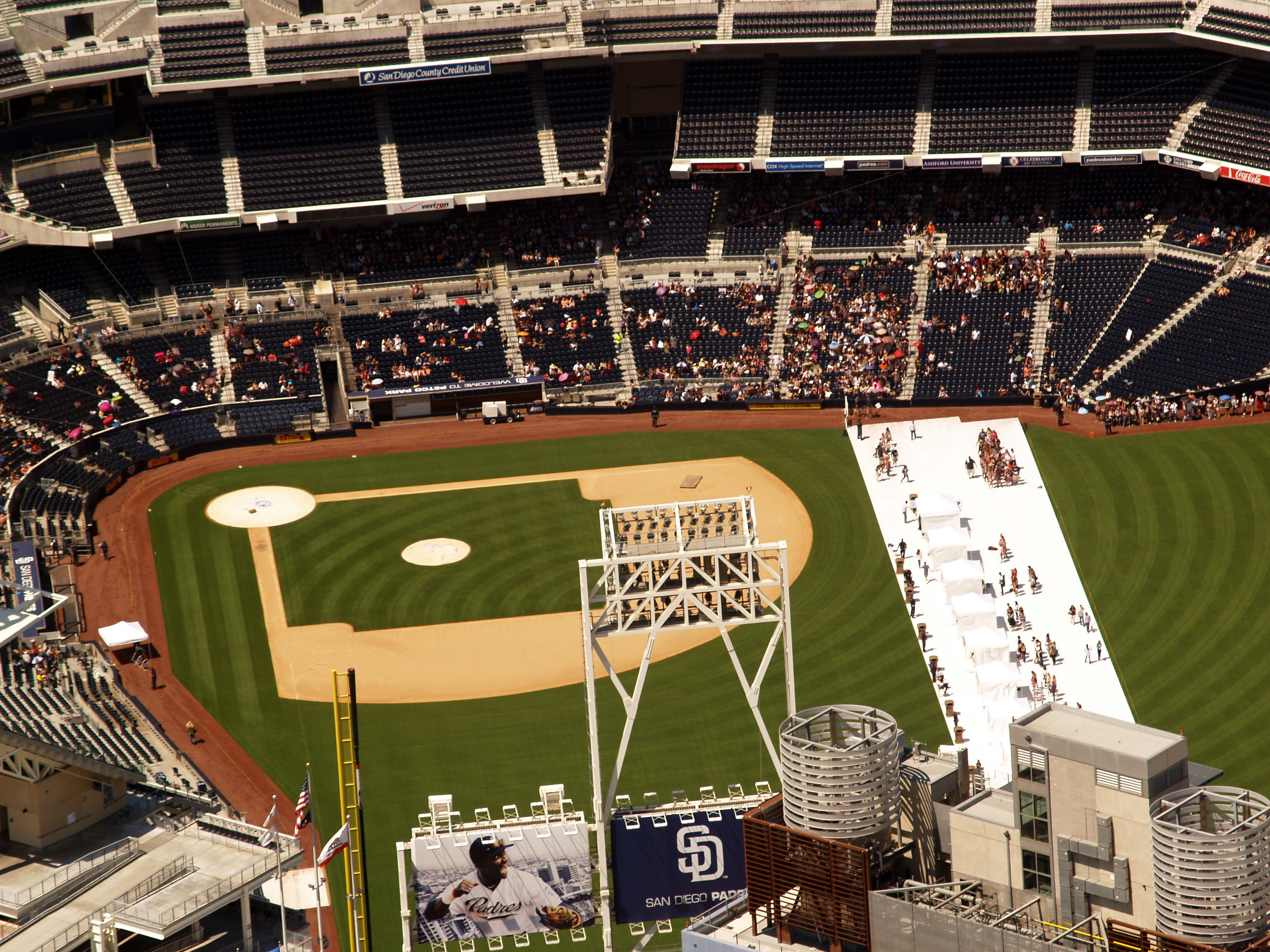
American Idol auditions at Petco Park, July 8, 2011

In 2011, the Food Network filmed a "Chairman's Challenge" at Petco Park that was to air as part of Season 4, episode 2 of The Next Iron Chef.

In 2019, TwitchCon took place in the Convention Center with the TwitchCon Party featuring Blink-182, Madeon, Au/Ra, and Y2K was held on September 28, 2019, at Petco Park.

On April 21, 2025, during the Monday Night Raw after WrestleMania 41, it was announced during the commercial break, that the 2025 Survivor Series event would take place at Petco Park. It is the first Survivor Series event to be held in an outside venue and the first to be held in a stadium. The event saw an attendance of 46,016 fans, setting a new record for Survivor Series. The former record was 21,300, established during the 1987 Survivor Series at the Richfield Coliseum in Richfield Township, Ohio.

=== San Diego Comic-Con ===
Due to a lack of space in the San Diego Convention Center, San Diego Comic-Con and other events associated with entertainment have been allowed to host activities in Petco Park. On July 29, 2018, Rocket League held their third birthday party as an offsite event part of San Diego Comic-Con.

== Media ==
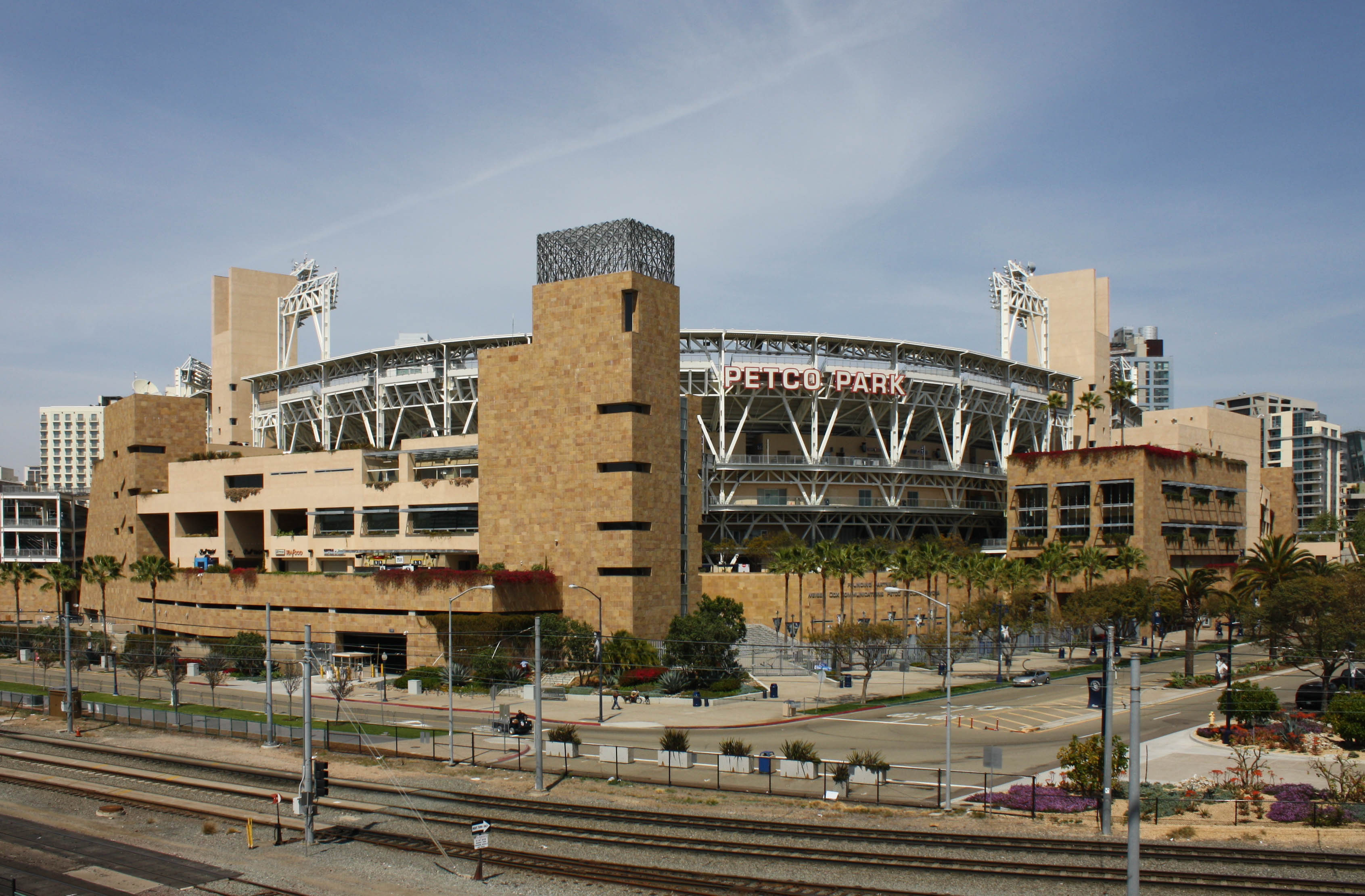
Petco Park from the outside.

Petco Park can be seen and can even be entered in the video game Midnight Club 3 in the city of San Diego.

Petco Park and Fenway Park were visibly fused together to create "Greenway Park" in Call of Duty Ghosts.

=== PETA protest ===
During stadium construction, the Padres offered fans the chance to purchase bricks outside of the concourse and to dedicate them. PETA tried to purchase a brick to protest Petco's treatment of animals (PETA and Petco have a long-standing dispute over this matter), but the first two attempts were denied. Undeterred, PETA succeeded on its third attempt by purchasing a brick, which read "Break Open Your Cold Ones Toast The Padres Enjoy This Champion Organization." When one reads the first letter of each word, it forms an acrostic which reads "BOYCOTT PETCO." The Padres decided to leave the brick, saying not enough people walking by would notice the secret meaning.

== Features and design ==
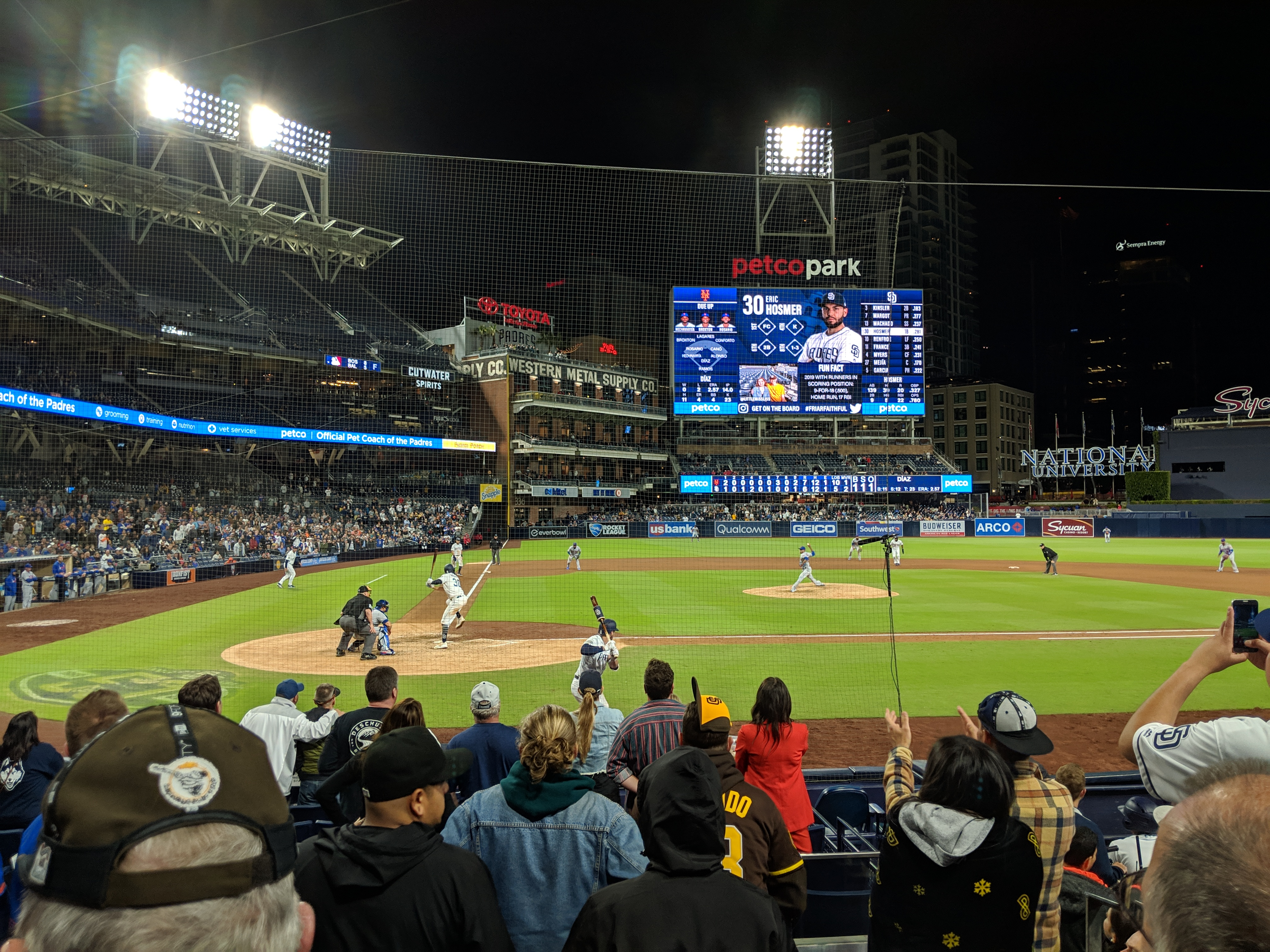
The interior of Petco Park

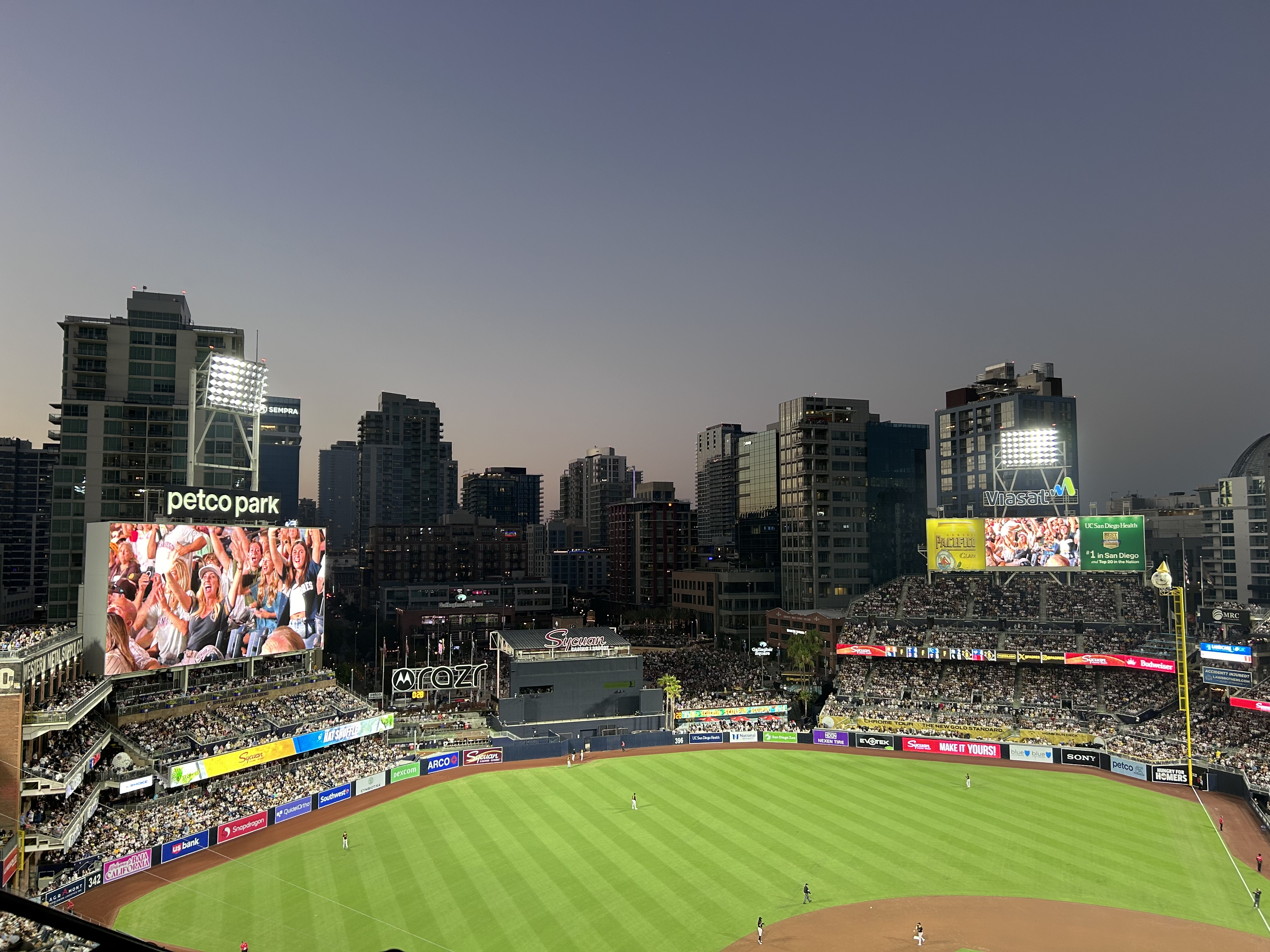
Interior of Petco Park looking over downtown San Diego on August 12, 2024

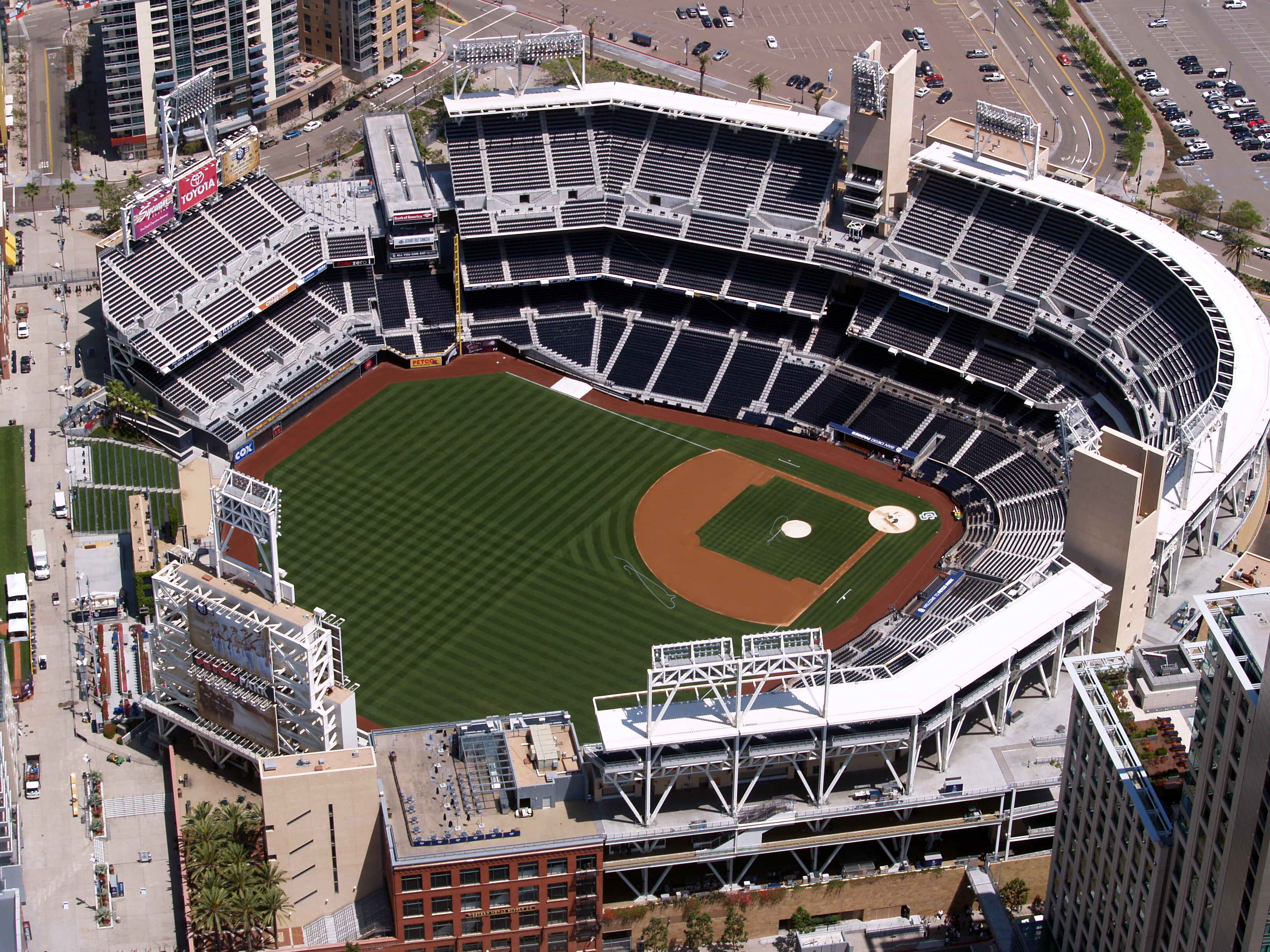
Petco Park, as seen from 1000 feet overhead

Petco Park differentiates itself from many other Major League ballparks built in the same era by eschewing "retro-style" red brick and green seats. The stadium is clad in Indian sandstone and stucco; its exposed steel is painted white and the 39,860 fixed seats are dark blue. The design is meant to evoke the sandy color of San Diego cliffs and beaches, the blue of the ocean, and the white sails of boats on the nearby San Diego Bay.

Architects Populous (née HOK Sport) and Antoine Predock's design pulled restaurants, administrative offices and other amenities away from the seating bowl itself into other buildings surrounding the bowl. As a result, the ballpark's concourses are open not only to the playing field but also to the surrounding city. Unlike many outdoor ballparks, in which the batter faces northeast, at Petco the batter faces due north, and fans in the grandstands are treated to a view of San Diego Bay and the San Diego skyline beyond the left field seats, as well as a view of Balboa Park, which contains the San Diego Zoo, beyond center field. The San Diego Union-Tribune honored the ballpark in 2006 with an Orchid award for its design.

Petco Park's official address is 19 Tony Gwynn Way, in honor of the eight-time National League batting champion who wore that uniform number during his major league career. A 10-foot (3.0 m) statue of Gwynn was unveiled July 21, 2007, on the stadium grounds. On August 18, 2018, a statue of National League Saves Leader and longtime Padre Trevor Hoffman was unveiled along K Street behind the bullpen, facing Gwynn's statue.

Gallagher Square, a grassy berm sloping above the outfield fence, is open during games, allowing fans to sit and watch games. When no games are being played, Gallagher Square serves as a free local park for area residents. An unusual feature Petco Park once had was that the home team bullpen was located behind the center field wall while the bullpen for the visiting team was in foul territory in right field. However, both bullpens were moved behind the center field wall after modifications to the ballpark were made prior to the start of the 2013 season. For the 2012 season, Gallagher Square also played host to a semi-permanent stage used by the Padres' new broadcaster, at the time known as Fox Sports San Diego, for pre-game and post-game programming.

The left-field HD videoboard, manufactured by Daktronics, was installed in 2015. Measuring 61.2 feet (18.7 m) tall by 123.6 feet (37.7 m) wide, the new videoboard is nearly five times the size of the previous board and was, as of 2016, Major League Baseball's fifth-largest (behind Cleveland, Seattle, Kansas City, and Atlanta) and the National League's second-largest (edging out Philadelphia). The Padres can show full-screen live game action, video replays, or fan prompts or split the screen into sections for statistical information, graphics, and animations.

In addition to the left-field display, the Padres installed LED ribbon boards stretching nearly 750 feet (230 m) along the first- and third-base lines on the Toyota Terrace level, as well as 130 feet (40 m) of ribbon boards on the left-field grandstand.

The Padres also added eight mini scoreboards located under overhangs in the seating bowl on the field level, along with new 60-in. Sony TVs in the same areas, to give fans seated in the back of those sections better views.

To support the new HD videoboards, the Padres partnered with Sony and Diversified Systems on an HD control room. Located on the press level on the third-base side, the control room houses a Sony MVS8000x switcher, ChyronHego graphics servers, Click Effects CrossFire servers, and Evertz router, DreamCatcher replay servers, and terminal gear. The team will deploy a complement of Sony HSC300 cameras and two wireless roving cameras while it considers additional models for 4K acquisition.

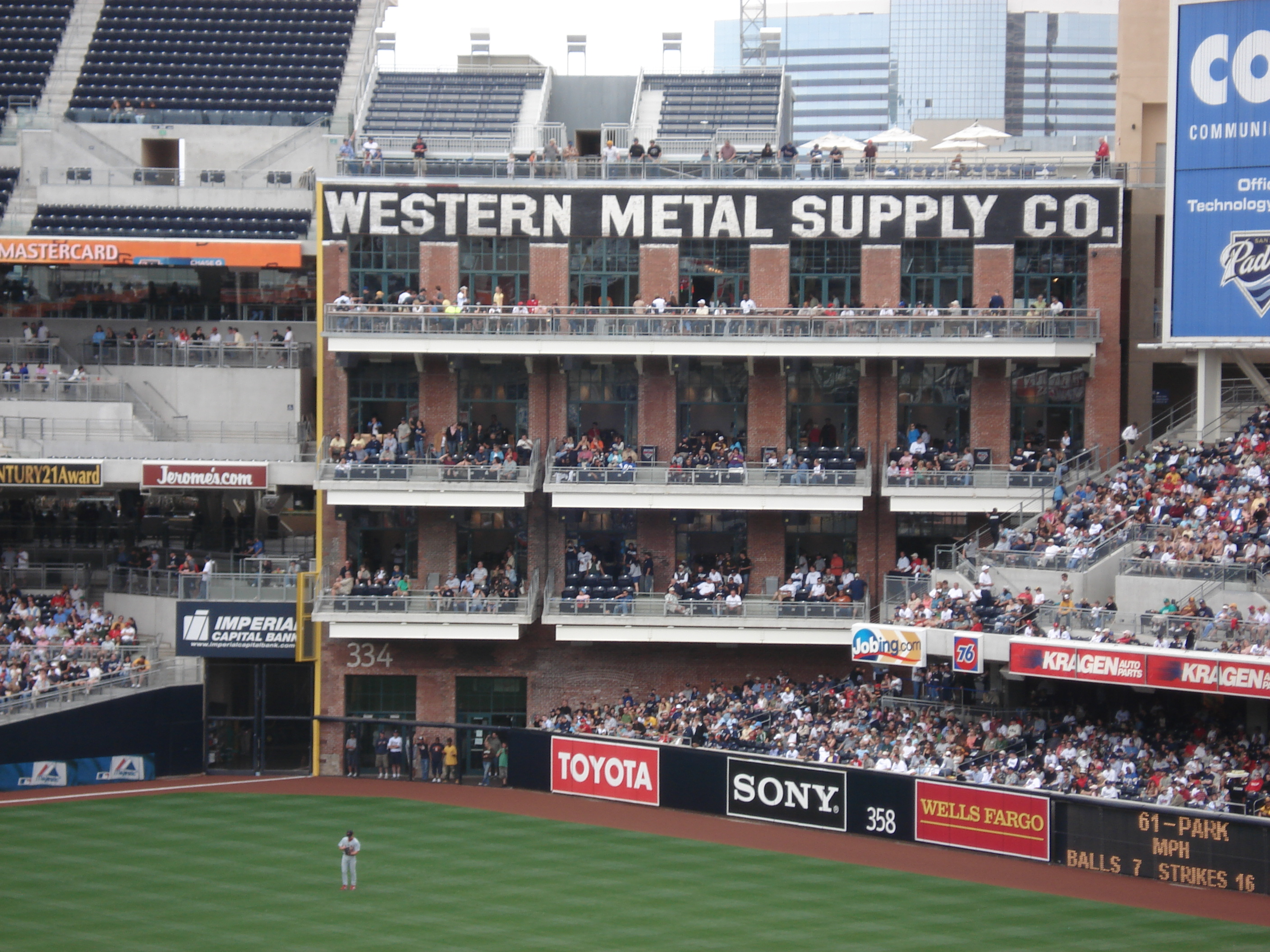
The Western Metal Building as seen during a game.

The Western Metal Supply Co. building, a hundred-year-old brick structure that had been scheduled for demolition to make way for Petco Park, was saved and incorporated into the design of the ballpark. The building was renovated and contains the team store, private suites, a restaurant and rooftop seating. The southeast corner of the building serves as the left field foul pole, and is protected by a strip of bright yellow angle iron.

Fans in concession stands, in bars, restaurants or wandering the stands can watch the action on 244 HDTV monitors and an additional 500 SDTVs. More than 500 computer-controlled speakers throughout the park deliver the sound as a "distributed signal", eliminating the audio delay from a central bank of speakers, such as the system at Qualcomm Stadium. Four stationary cameras, one roving camera and use of six Cox-TV cameras provide videos for the park's screens.

Every time the Padres hit a home run or win the game, a ship's whistle is sounded and fireworks are shot off in center field. Beginning with the 2011 season, four torches were added to the center field wall that light up when the Padres hit a home run or win the game. The ship's whistle is a recording of the whistle of the Navy's USS Ronald Reagan, a nuclear aircraft carrier that was ported in San Diego.

There are a total of 5,000 club seats and 70 luxury suites at the ballpark.

=== Modifications ===
Petco Park has been described as being an "extreme pitcher's park". During the 2005–06 offseason, Padres CEO Sandy Alderson adjusted the dimensions in right-center field in an attempt to make it more hitter friendly. At the end of the 2008 season, Petco Park ranked 29th in hits and 30th out of 30 in home runs per Major League ballpark.

Following the conclusion of the 2012 season, the Padres announced that they were moving the fences in to make this ballpark more favorable to hitters than it had been previously. The left-center field wall was moved in from 402 feet (123 m) to 390 feet (120 m), the right-center field wall was moved from 411 feet (125 m) to 391 feet (119 m), and the right field wall was moved in from 360 feet (110 m) to 349 feet (106 m). In addition, the visiting team bullpen was moved from foul territory in right field to behind the left-center field wall, right behind where the Padres bullpen is. The right field wall was also lowered from 11 feet (3.4 m) to 8 feet (2.4 m), and the out-of-town scoreboard was relocated.

After the conclusion of the 2014 season, more renovations to the park commenced. These include a new HD video board, slight changes to the distance to the left-field fence, and removal of some seats in the middle deck (which were replaced with standing-room seating). The alterations, including the new video board, were completed by Opening Day 2015.

=== Climate ===
Petco Park

Climate chart (precipitation, max. and min. temperature)
| J | F | M | A | M | J | J | A | S | O | N | D |
| 22 18 11 | 25 22 14 | 50 25 16 | 20 28 17 | 6 25 14 | 1 27 17 | 1 29 20 | 3 32 20 | 5 30 22 | 7 28 20 | 22 23 14 | 56 16 11 |
- █ Average max. and min. temperatures in °C
- █ Precipitation totals in mm
Imperial conversion
| J | F | M | A | M | J | J | A | S | O | N | D |
| 0.9 64 52 | 1 72 57 | 2 77 61 | 0.8 82 63 | 0.2 77 57 | 0 81 63 | 0 84 68 | 0.1 90 68 | 0.2 86 72 | 0.3 82 68 | 0.9 73 57 | 2.2 61 52 |
- █ Average max. and min. temperatures in °F
- █ Precipitation totals in inches

== See also ==
- List of current Major League Baseball stadiums

Events and tenants
| Preceded by Qualcomm Stadium | Home of the San Diego Padres since 2004 | Succeeded by n/a |
| Preceded by First | World Baseball Classic Final Venue; 2006 | Succeeded by Dodger Stadium |
| Preceded by Home Depot Center | Home of USA Sevens; 2007–2009 | Succeeded by Sam Boyd Stadium |
| Preceded by Great American Ball Park | Host of the Major League Baseball All-Star Game; 2016 | Succeeded by Marlins Park |
| Preceded by Qualcomm Stadium | Home of the Holiday Bowl; 2021–2023 | Succeeded by Snapdragon Stadium |
