= Gallagher Square =

Park in San Diego, California, U.S.

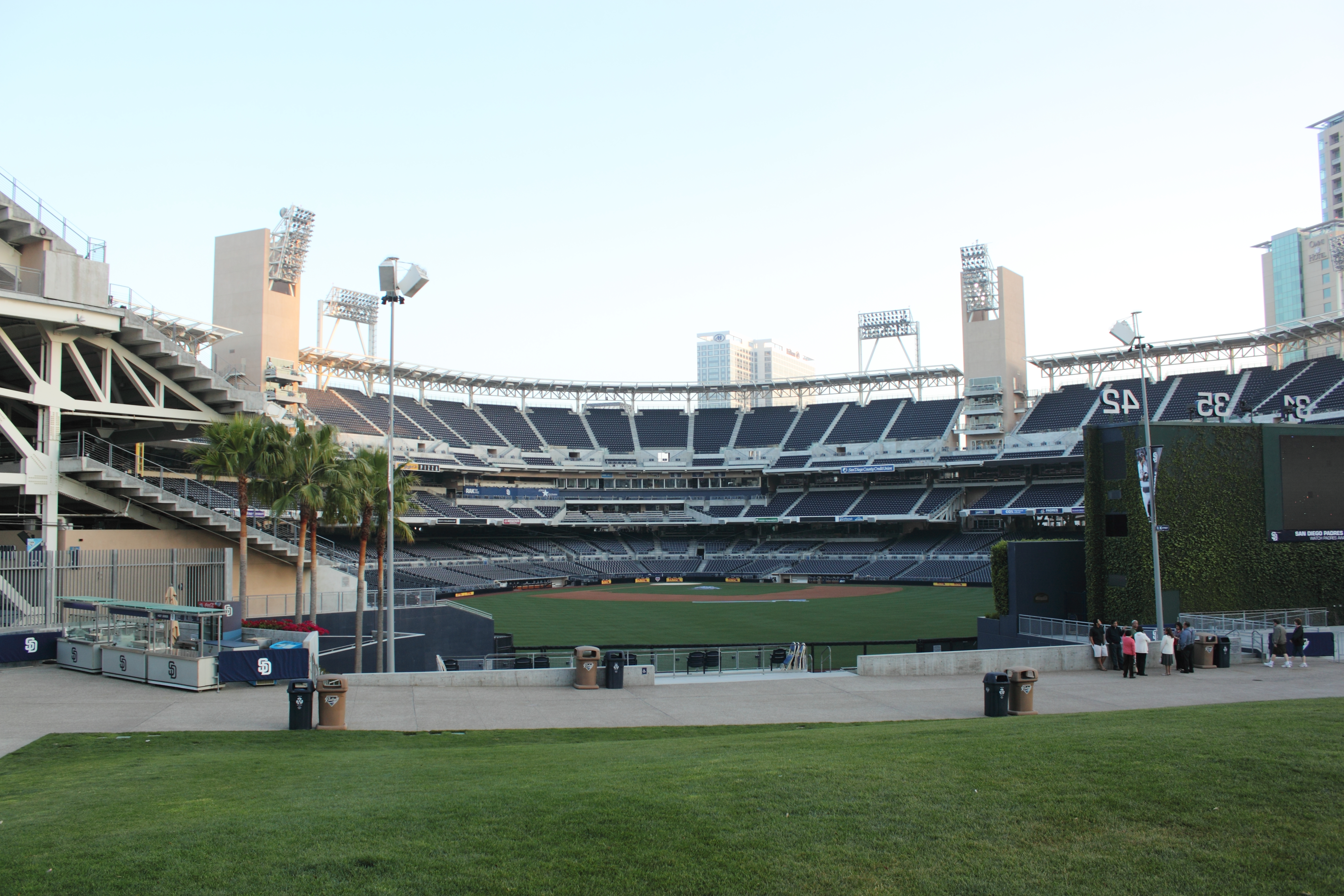
- View of Petco Park from Gallagher Square, 2010
- Interactive map of Gallagher Square
- Location: San Diego, California, U.S.
- Coordinates: 32°42′32″N 117°09′25″W
- Area: 2.8 acres (1.1 ha)

Gallagher Square (formerly Park at the Park) is a 2.8-acre (1.1 ha) park located outside the outfield fence of Petco Park in San Diego, California. It is a public park during stadium off-hours, it includes a viewing terrace, playground, and off-leash dog park.

The park received its current name in December 2019 as part of a multi-year partnership making Gallagher the San Diego Padres' official insurance broker, benefits consultant and risk management services partner.
