= Tuk Smith and The Restless Hearts =

American rock band

- Origin: Nashville, Tennessee, U.S.
- Genres: Rock
- Years active: 2020–present
- Labels: Better Noise, Eleven Seven
- Members: Tuk Smith; Matthew Curtis; Nigel Dupree; Tobin Dale
- Past members: Shane Rickerson; Ricky Dover Jr.
- Website: https://www.tuksmithandtherestlesshearts.com/

Tuk Smith and The Restless Hearts is an American rock band from Nashville founded and fronted by former Biters frontman, Tuk Smith, from Atlanta. The band released their debut single, "What Kinda Love", on January 10, 2020, and were also added as an opening act for The Stadium Tour with Def Leppard and Mötley Crüe on the same day. Their debut album, Lookin' For Love, Ready For War, was due to be released later in 2020 through Better Noise. However, the band and label parted ways after the COVID-19 pandemic forced the Stadium Tour and album release to be delayed, and the album was shelved. They then signed with a new label, Music Recording Group (MRG) and released their new debut album, Ballad of a Misspent Youth, in late 2022. After parting ways with MRG in 2023, Tuk has started his own label, Gypsy Rose Records, and released his second full-length album, Rogue to Redemption, on August 30, 2024. The EP Troubled Paradise is set to be released on October 16, 2025.

== Members ==
=== Current members ===
- Tuk Smith – vocals, guitar
- Tobin Dale – guitar
- Matthew Curtis – bass

=== Past members ===
- Nigel Dupree - drums
- Ricky Dover Jr. - guitar
- Shane Rickerson - bass

== Discography ==
=== Singles ===
Title	Release date	Label
"What Kinda Love"	January 10, 2020	Better Noise Music
"Lookin' for Love, Ready for War"	March 6, 2020	Better Noise Music
"Same Old You"	October 2, 2020	Better Noise Music
"Ballad of a Misspent Youth"	August 12, 2022	Music Recording Group
'Everybody Loves You When You're Dead"	September 30, 2022	Music Recording Group
"Girls on the East Side of Town"	November 4, 2022	Music Recording Group
"Take the Long Way"	January 25, 2024	Gypsy Rose Records
"Glorybound"	March 7, 2024	Gypsy Rose Records
"Little Renegade"	April 25, 2024	Gypsy Rose Records
"Blood on the Stage"	July 18, 2024	Gypsy Rose Records
"End of an Era"	August 30, 2024	Gypsy Rose Records
"Little Renegade - Ballad Version"	January 17, 2025	Gypsy Rose Records
"Glorybound (Stripped Down Version)"	February 14, 2025	Gypsy Rose Records
"Troubled Paradise"	June 13, 2025	Gypsy Rose Records
"Runnin' with the Wild Ones"	July 24, 2025	Gypsy Rose Records
"Sadie Mae"	September 4, 2025	Gypsy Rose Records

=== EPs ===
Title	Release date	Label
What Kinda Love	March 29, 2020	Better Noise Music
Troubled Paradise	October 16, 2025	Gypsy Rose Records

=== Albums ===
Title	Release date	Label
Ballad of a Misspent Youth	November 4, 2022	Music Recording Group
Rogue to Redemption	August 30, 2024	Gypsy Rose Records
