= Climax Series =

Playoff system implemented by Japan's Nippon Professional Baseball

Climax Series logo

The Climax Series (クライマックスシリーズ, Kuraimakkusu Shirīzu) is the current annual playoff system implemented by Japan's Nippon Professional Baseball (NPB). It determines which team from the Central League (CL) and from the Pacific League (PL) will advance to compete for the championship in the Japan Series. After the creation of the NPB's two-league system in 1950, the PL experimented with three different playoff systems. In 2004, it implemented the postseason structure from which the Climax Series is based. After three seasons, the CL adopted the same system in 2007, creating the current, unified playoff format.

Both leagues play a regular season, after which the top three teams in each league compete against one another in a two-stage playoff. In the first stage, the teams that finish the regular season with the second- and third-best records play one another in best-of-three series. The winners of these three-game series advance to a second and final stage to face each league's regular-season champion. The final stage is a best-of-six series with the regular-season champion given a one-game advantage. However, if the pennant winner finished the season ten games better than the first-stage-winning team or if the first-stage-winning team finished the regular season with a losing record, the series then changes to a best-of-seven with the pennant winner given a second game advantage.

== History ==
Since the creation of the Nippon Professional Baseball's (NPB) two-league system, the regular-season winner of the Central League (CL) had always advanced to the Japan Series, where it competed against the Pacific League (PL) champion. The PL used the same system until 1973, when the league created NPB's only postseason play prior to 2004 (other than the Japan Series). This new system matched the team with the season's best first-half record against the team with the best second-half record. The winner of this best-of-five series advanced to the Japan Series, where they played against the CL champion. This system proved problematic when the Hankyu Braves won both the first and second halves of the 1976 and 1978 seasons, making a playoff series unnecessary. It was eliminated after the 1982 season, and instead the PL announced the following season that the first- and second-place teams would compete in a best-of-five playoff series after the 130-game regular season if five or fewer games separated the two teams. Unpopular with most baseball media and fans, the idea was scrapped after three seasons with a series never needing to be played. The two leagues returned to sending the team with the best regular season record in their respective league to compete against each other in the championship series.

=== Pacific League playoffs ===
It's stupid for the other league to be operating under a different system. If we win the C.L. pennant next year, we'll boycott the [Japan] Series.

— Tsuneo Watanabe, the owner of the Yomiuri Giants

In February 2003, the Pacific League board of directors agreed to reintroduce a playoff system to be used for the 2004 NPB season. If a first-place team had a substantial lead in the standings nearing the end of the regular season, the league's champion would have been decided and there was little excitement until the start of the Japan Series. The decision to add a PL playoff was an attempt to rectify this problem and increase the league's popularity. The new postseason plan initiated a two-stage playoff in which the top three PL teams competed. In the first stage, the teams that finished the newly shortened, 135-game regular season with the second- and third-best records played each other in a best-of-three series. The winner of this series faced the league's top finisher in the second, final stage. The second stage winner advanced to the Japan Series, where they competed against the CL's Climax Series champion team.

Originally, the top finisher in the league at the end of the season was only supposed to receive home-field advantage throughout the second stage, but in August 2003, PL officials announced that if the first-place team led the second-place team by more than five games at the end of the regular season, that team would also receive a one-game winning advantage in the second stage's best-of-five series. For the 2006 Pacific League Playoffs, PL officials removed the five-game lead requirement in favor of automatically awarding the first-place team the one-win advantage. In conjunction with this change, the first-place team no longer had home-field advantage for the entirety of the second stage; instead, the remaining four games were to be split evenly between both teams' stadiums. This rule change became a non-factor after the eventual first-place Hokkaido Nippon-Ham Fighters clinched a Japan Series berth in two straight games.

During the three years of the PL's playoff system, the winner of the PL's postseason tournament competed against the CL team who finished the regular season with the best record. The disparity between the two leagues' postseasons provoked some criticism from baseball analysts and insiders. During the 2005 Japan Series, The Japan Times' Stephen Ellsesser called NPB's unbalanced postseason a "bad system" and believed that the CL's decision to not implement a playoff system of their own was "foolish". Citing the Hanshin Tigers' poor Japan Series performance, he speculated that the CL's lack of postseason play was a disadvantage. Ellsesser believed that the 17 days between their last regular-season game and the first Japan Series game did nothing to prepare the Tigers for the eventual championship series against the Chiba Lotte Marines, who had played continuously. Like Ellsesser, after seeing the "excitement" that the 2004 PL Playoffs caused, then-Marines manager Bobby Valentine was "incredulous that the Central League didn't follow suit" and create a playoff series of their own.

=== Climax Series creation ===
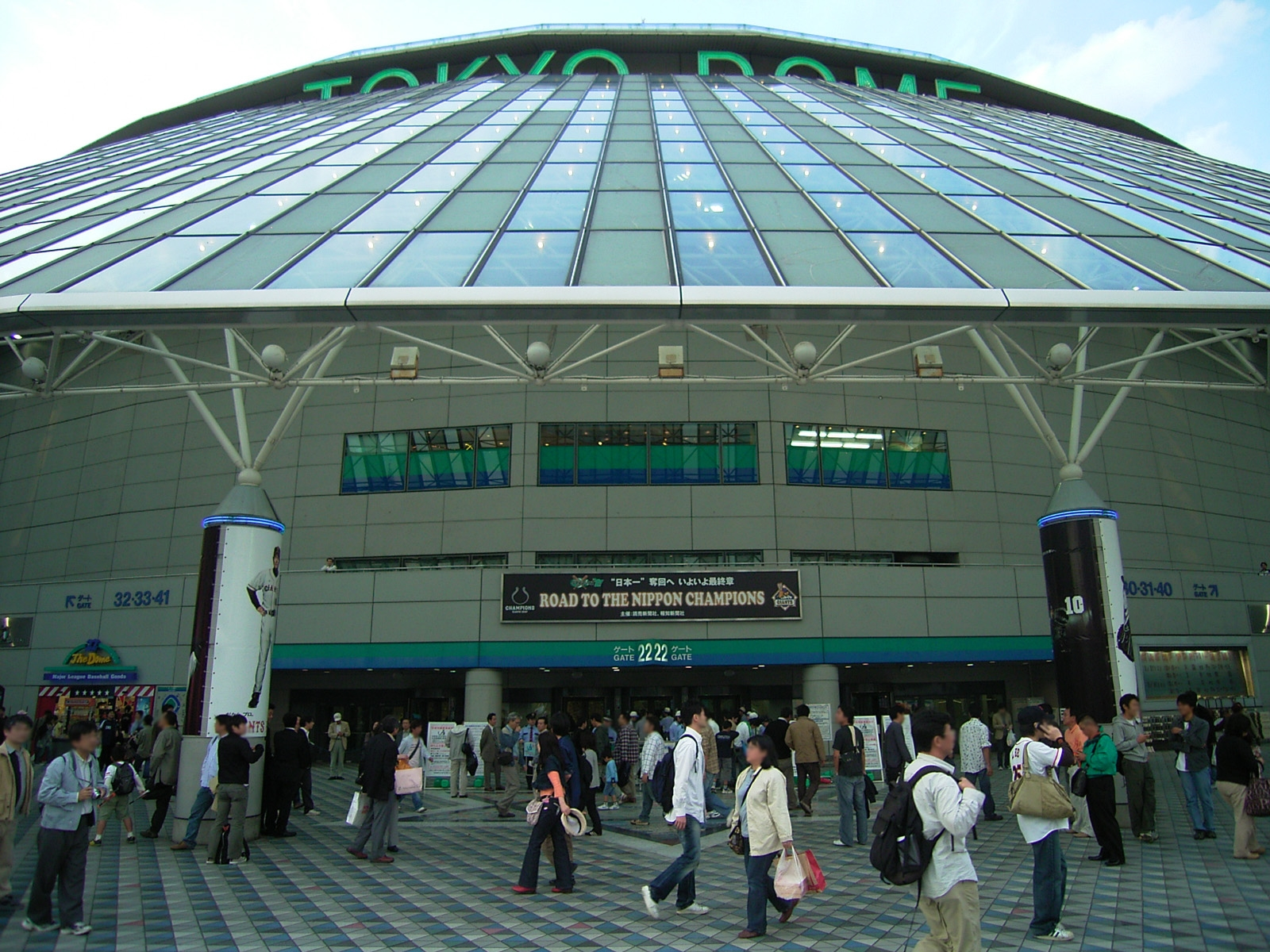
The Tokyo Dome, home of the Yomiuri Giants, hosted the second stage of the inaugural Central League Climax Series.

The Central League had situational playoff scenarios written into its bylaws that required either a tie in the standings or a team with more wins finishing with a worse winning percentage than the top team, but a permanent playoff plan had never been created. In March 2006, encouraged by the success of the PL's playoff series, CL officials announced their intention to introduce postseason playoffs for the 2007 season to help boost declining attendance. During meetings held later that year, PL and CL officials disagreed over proposed plans detailing the new playoff system. Since the creation of the PL playoffs in 2004, the league awarded its pennant titles to the playoff winners rather than the team who finished the regular season with the best record. The PL disapproved of the CL's intentions to continue awarding their league title to the first-place finisher in the regular season while using the playoffs to determine which team would compete against in the Japan Series.

We stuck with the principle of not having playoffs for a long time, but it's true that the playoffs in the Pacific League have had positive effects. We've decided to add some thrills and excitement to the postseason.

— Hajime Toyokura, Central League President

In September 2006, both leagues agreed on a unified postseason system. The CL implemented a playoff system identical to the PL's, and the entire playoff series was dubbed the "Climax Series". The PL agreed to name the regular season first-place finishers league champions rather than the team that won the leagues' respective playoffs—a reversal from the previous three seasons. It was decided that both leagues would play 144 regular-season games, the first time both leagues would play the same number of games since the PL introduced its playoff system in 2004. The two leagues also agreed that neither regular-season champion should receive a one-game advantage in the final stage of the Climax Series, claiming that it was unnecessary from a business point of view. It had been suggested that the Yomiuri Giants voted to approve the playoff idea in 2006 because they had not finished atop the standings in the regular season since 2002 and the playoff concept would increase the Giants' chances of winning the Japan Series. However, the plan backfired on them. In the Climax Series' inaugural season, the Giants finally won the CL pennant but were still denied a Japan Series berth when they were defeated by the second-place Chunichi Dragons in a three-game sweep during the final stage of the 2007 Central League Climax Series. The next season, the leagues overturned their decision on the final stage advantage and agreed to award their champions an automatic one-win advantage in the final stage starting with the 2008 Climax Series. At the same time, the final stage changed from a best-of-five series and became a best-of-seven series, where the first team to accumulate four wins advances to the Japan Series.

The 2020 season, shortened to 120 games because of the COVID-19 pandemic, featured a modified Climax Series. The PL Climax Series had the season's top-two seeded teams play a best-of-five series, with the league's champion still being awarded the automatic one-win advantage. The CL forwent a playoff series completely, instead advancing their league champion directly to the Japan Series. The CL's decision to eliminate their Climax Series was due in part to just two of the league's six teams regularly playing in domed stadiums, making it unclear how many games would need to be made-up at the end of the season due to potential rainouts.

The NPB Executive Committee held discussions about possibility of modifying the Climax Series during the 2025–26 offseason. Talks were primarily focused on possibly changing the final stage advantage, specifically regarding a large regular season record discrepancy between the competing teams or teams that advanced with a losing regular-season record. Despite rumors, it was confirmed that the possibility of not allowing a top-three team with a losing record to participate in the Series was never considered. Just prior to the start of the 2026 season, the committee decided to modify the final stage advantage. The series would continue as usual, a best-of-six series with a one win advantage, unless the pennant-winning teams led the first-stage-winning teams by 10 games or more in the regular season standings or if the advancing teams finished the regular season with a losing record. If either of these criteria are met, the series becomes a best-of-seven and the win advantage in increased to two games.

== Current format ==
Both leagues employ the same postseason format, with the top three teams from each league participating in their own two-stage playoff. Teams are ranked via their regular-season winning percentage. If teams finish with the same winning percentage, the following criteria are used to rank them:

Central League

1. The team with the higher number of wins advances
2. The team with the higher winning percentage in head-to-head games advances
3. The team with the higher winning percentage in regular-season games excluding interleague games advances
4. The team with the higher ranking the previous season advances

Pacific League

1. The team with the higher winning percentage in head-to-head games advances
2. The team with the higher winning percentage in regular-season games excluding interleague games advances
3. The team with the higher ranking the previous season advances

The first stage is a best-of-three series involving the regular season's second- and third-place finishers, with all games played at the second-place team's home field. The winner of this series goes on to face the league's pennant winner in the final stage. (Note: The final stage was known as the "second stage" from 2007 to 2009.) This series is a best-of-six series played entirely at the first place team's home field and they are also awarded a one win advantage. However, if the pennant-winning teams led the first-stage-winning teams by 10 games or more in the regular season standings or if the advancing teams finished the regular season with a losing record, the series is then changed to a best-of-seven series with the pennant winners being given a two win advantage. The final-stage-winning teams advance to the Japan Series, where they compete against one another. Unlike Major League Baseball (MLB), NPB games may end in a tie if there is no winner after 12 innings of play. If a Climax Series game results in a tie, the win is credited to neither team. If this causes the series to end in a tie, the higher-seeded team advances.

First stage
Central League
2	CL second-place team
3	CL third-place team
Pacific League
2	PL second-place team
3	PL third-place team

Final stage
1	CL first-place team
?	Winner of CL First stage
1	PL first-place team
?	Winner of PL First stage

Japan Series
?	Winner of CL Final stage
?	Winner of PL Final stage

== Results ==
League champions advanced through the Climax Series to the Japan Series in all but seven cases. Of the seven teams non-first-place teams win the Climax Series, four were second-place teams and three were third. Seven teams have reached the postseason with a losing record, with five advancing to the final stage but never winning.

=== Central League ===
Central League Climax Series results
Year	Stage	Home team	Games	Road team	Stadium	Most Valuable Player	Notes
2007	First	**Chunichi Dragons***	2–0	Hanshin Tigers	Nagoya Dome	Not awarded	
2007	Second	Yomiuri Giants	0–3^{[a]}	**Chunichi Dragons***	Tokyo Dome	Not awarded	
2008	First	Hanshin Tigers	1–2	Chunichi Dragons*	Kyocera Dome Osaka^{[b]}	Not awarded	
2008	Second	Yomiuri Giants*	3–1–1	Chunichi Dragons	Tokyo Dome	Alex Ramírez	
2009	First	Chunichi Dragons*	2–1	Tokyo Yakult Swallows	Nagoya Dome	Not awarded	
2009	Second	**Yomiuri Giants***	4–1	Chunichi Dragons	Tokyo Dome	Ryota Wakiya	
2010	First	Hanshin Tigers	0–2	Yomiuri Giants*	Koshien Stadium	Not awarded	
2010	Final	Chunichi Dragons*	4–1	Yomiuri Giants	Nagoya Dome	Kazuhiro Wada	
2011	First	Tokyo Yakult Swallows*	2–1	Yomiuri Giants	Meiji Jingu Stadium	Not awarded	
2011	Final	Chunichi Dragons*	4–2	Tokyo Yakult Swallows	Nagoya Dome	Kazuki Yoshimi	
2012	First	Chunichi Dragons*	2–1	Tokyo Yakult Swallows	Nagoya Dome	Not awarded	
2012	Final	**Yomiuri Giants***	4–3	Chunichi Dragons	Tokyo Dome	Yoshihito Ishii	
2013	First	Hanshin Tigers	0–2	Hiroshima Toyo Carp*	Koshien Stadium	Not awarded	
2013	Final	Yomiuri Giants*	4–0	Hiroshima Toyo Carp	Tokyo Dome	Tomoyuki Sugano	
2014	First	Hanshin Tigers*	1–1–0	Hiroshima Toyo Carp	Koshien Stadium	Not awarded	
2014	Final	Yomiuri Giants	1–4	Hanshin Tigers*	Tokyo Dome	Seung-hwan Oh	
2015	First	Yomiuri Giants*	2–1	Hanshin Tigers	Tokyo Dome	Not awarded	
2015	Final	Tokyo Yakult Swallows*	4–1	Yomiuri Giants	Meiji Jingu Stadium	Shingo Kawabata	
2016	First	Yomiuri Giants	1–2	Yokohama DeNA BayStars*	Tokyo Dome	Not awarded	
2016	Final	Hiroshima Toyo Carp*	4–1	Yokohama DeNA BayStars	Mazda Stadium	Kosuke Tanaka	
2017	First	Hanshin Tigers	1–2	Yokohama DeNA BayStars*	Koshien Stadium	Not awarded	
2017	Final	Hiroshima Toyo Carp	2–4	Yokohama DeNA BayStars*	Mazda Stadium	José López	
2018	First	Tokyo Yakult Swallows	0–2	Yomiuri Giants*	Meiji Jingu Stadium	Not awarded	
2018	Final	Hiroshima Toyo Carp*	4–0	Yomiuri Giants	Mazda Stadium	Ryosuke Kikuchi	
2019	First	Yokohama DeNA BayStars	1–2	Hanshin Tigers*	Yokohama Stadium	Not awarded	
2019	Final	Yomiuri Giants*	4–1	Hanshin Tigers	Tokyo Dome	Kazuma Okamoto	
2020	Central League Climax Series canceled because of the COVID-19 pandemic**^{c}**						
2021	First	Hanshin Tigers	0–2	Yomiuri Giants*	Koshien Stadium	Not awarded	
2021	Final	**Tokyo Yakult Swallows***	3–1–0	Yomiuri Giants	Meiji Jingu Stadium	Yasunobu Okugawa	
2022	First	Yokohama DeNA BayStars	1–2	Hanshin Tigers*	Yokohama Stadium	Not awarded	
2022	Final	Tokyo Yakult Swallows*	4–0	Hanshin Tigers	Meiji Jingu Stadium	José Osuna	
2023	First	Hiroshima Toyo Carp*	2–0	Yokohama DeNA BayStars	Mazda Stadium	Not awarded	
2023	Final	**Hanshin Tigers***	4–0	Hiroshima Toyo Carp	Koshien Stadium	Seiya Kinami	
2024	First	Hanshin Tigers	0–2	Yokohama DeNA BayStars*	Koshien Stadium	Not awarded	
2024	Final	Yomiuri Giants	3–4	**Yokohama DeNA BayStars***	Tokyo Dome	Yasutaka Tobashira	
2025	First	Yokohama DeNA BayStars*	2–0	Yomiuri Giants	Yokohama Stadium	Not awarded	
2025	Final	Hanshin Tigers*	4–0	Yokohama DeNA BayStars	Koshien Stadium	Shota Morishita	
2026	First	Yomiuri Giants	0–2	Yokohama DeNA BayStars*	Tokyo Dome	Not awarded	
2026	Final	Hanshin Tigers	1–4	Yokohama DeNA BayStars*	Koshien Stadium	Shugo Maki	

* The team won the stage.
BOLD: The team went on to win the Japan Series.
^{a} The inaugural 2007 second stage was a best-of-five series that did not award the league champion with a one-win advantage.
^{b} Due to ongoing offseason renovations at Koshien Stadium, the Hanshin Tigers' home stadium, the 2008 first stage games were instead played at Kyocera Dome Osaka.
^{c} Due to the COVID-19 pandemic, the league champion advanced directly to the 2020 Japan Series.

=== Pacific League ===
Pacific League Climax Series results
Year	Stage	Home team	Games	Road team	Stadium	Most Valuable Player	Notes
2007	First	Chiba Lotte Marines*	2–1	Fukuoka SoftBank Hawks	Chiba Marine Stadium	Saburo Omura	
2007	Second	Hokkaido Nippon-Ham Fighters*	3–2^{[a]}	Chiba Lotte Marines	Sapporo Dome	Yu Darvish	
2008	First	Orix Buffaloes	0–2	Hokkaido Nippon-Ham Fighters*	Kyocera Dome Osaka	Not awarded	
2008	Second	**Saitama Seibu Lions***	4–2	Hokkaido Nippon-Ham Fighters	Seibu Dome^{[b]}	Hideaki Wakui	
2009	First	Tohoku Rakuten Golden Eagles*	2–0	Fukuoka SoftBank Hawks	Kleenex Stadium	Not awarded	
2009	Second	Hokkaido Nippon-Ham Fighters*	4–1	Tohoku Rakuten Golden Eagles	Sapporo Dome	Terrmel Sledge	
2010	First	Saitama Seibu Lions	0–2	**Chiba Lotte Marines***	Seibu Dome	Tomoya Satozaki	
2010	Final	Fukuoka SoftBank Hawks	3–4	**Chiba Lotte Marines***	Yahoo Dome	Yoshihisa Naruse	
2011	First	Hokkaido Nippon-Ham Fighters	0–2	Saitama Seibu Lions*	Sapporo Dome	Not awarded	
2011	Final	**Fukuoka SoftBank Hawks***	4–0	Saitama Seibu Lions	Yahoo Dome	Seiichi Uchikawa	
2012	First	Saitama Seibu Lions	1–2	Fukuoka SoftBank Hawks*	Seibu Dome	Not awarded	
2012	Final	Hokkaido Nippon-Ham Fighters*	4–0	Fukuoka SoftBank Hawks	Sapporo Dome	Yoshio Itoi	
2013	First	Saitama Seibu Lions	1–2	Chiba Lotte Marines*	Seibu Dome	Not awarded	
2013	Final	**Tohoku Rakuten Golden Eagles***	4–1	Chiba Lotte Marines	Kleenex Stadium	Masahiro Tanaka	
2014	First	Orix Buffaloes	1–2	Hokkaido Nippon-Ham Fighters*	Kyocera Dome Osaka	Not awarded	
2014	Final	**Fukuoka SoftBank Hawks***	4–3	Hokkaido Nippon-Ham Fighters	Yafuoku Dome	Yuki Yoshimura	
2015	First	Hokkaido Nippon-Ham Fighters	1–2	Chiba Lotte Marines*	Sapporo Dome	Not awarded	
2015	Final	**Fukuoka SoftBank Hawks***	4–0	Chiba Lotte Marines	Yafuoku Dome	Seiichi Uchikawa	
2016	First	Fukuoka SoftBank Hawks*	2–0	Chiba Lotte Marines	Yafuoku Dome	Not awarded	
2016	Final	**Hokkaido Nippon-Ham Fighters***	4–2	Fukuoka SoftBank Hawks	Sapporo Dome	Sho Nakata	
2017	First	Saitama Seibu Lions	1–2	Tohoku Rakuten Golden Eagles*	MetLife Dome	Not awarded	
2017	Final	**Fukuoka SoftBank Hawks***	4–2	Tohoku Rakuten Golden Eagles	Yafuoku Dome	Seiichi Uchikawa	
2018	First	**Fukuoka SoftBank Hawks***	2–1	Hokkaido Nippon-Ham Fighters	Yafuoku Dome	Not awarded	
2018	Final	Saitama Seibu Lions	2–4	**Fukuoka SoftBank Hawks***	MetLife Dome	Yuki Yanagita	
2019	First	**Fukuoka SoftBank Hawks***	2–1	Tohoku Rakuten Golden Eagles	Yafuoku Dome	Not awarded	
2019	Final	Saitama Seibu Lions	1–4	**Fukuoka SoftBank Hawks***	MetLife Dome	Kenta Imamiya	
2020	First	Pacific League Climax Series first stage cancelled because of the COVID-19 pandemic					
2020	Final	**Fukuoka SoftBank Hawks***	3–0^{[c]}	Chiba Lotte Marines	PayPay Dome	Akira Nakamura	
2021	First	Chiba Lotte Marines	1–0–1	Tohoku Rakuten Golden Eagles	Zozo Marine Stadium	Not awarded	
2021	Final	Orix Buffaloes	3–0–1	Chiba Lotte Marines	Kyocera Dome Osaka	Yutaro Sugimoto	
2022	First	Fukuoka SoftBank Hawks	2–0	Saitama Seibu Lions	PayPay Dome	Not awarded	
2022	Final	**Orix Buffaloes***	4–1	Fukuoka SoftBank Hawks	Kyocera Dome Osaka	Masataka Yoshida	
2023	First	Chiba Lotte Marines*	2–1	Fukuoka SoftBank Hawks	Zozo Marine Stadium	Not awarded	
2023	Final	Orix Buffaloes*	4–1	Chiba Lotte Marines	Kyocera Dome Osaka	Yutaro Sugimoto	
2024	First	Hokkaido Nippon-Ham Fighters*	2–1	Chiba Lotte Marines	Es Con Field Hokkaido	Not awarded	
2024	Final	Fukuoka SoftBank Hawks*	4–0	Hokkaido Nippon-Ham Fighters	Mizuho PayPay Dome	Hotaka Yamakawa	
2025	First	Hokkaido Nippon-Ham Fighters*	2–0	Orix Buffaloes	Es Con Field Hokkaido	Not awarded	
2025	Final	**Fukuoka SoftBank Hawks***	4–3	Hokkaido Nippon-Ham Fighters	Mizuho PayPay Dome	Liván Moinelo	
2026	First	Saitama Seibu Lions	1–2	**Hokkaido Nippon-Ham Fighters***	Belluna Dome	Not awarded	
2026	Final	**Fukuoka SoftBank Hawks***	5–0	Hokkaido Nippon-Ham Fighters	Mizuho PayPay Dome	Yūdai Shōji	

* The team won the stage.
best-of-seven series, with two-game advantage awarded to home team.
BOLD: The team went on to win the Japan Series.
^{a} The inaugural 2007 second stage was a best-of-five series that did not award the league champion with a one-win advantage.
^{b} Instead of hosting the first game of the 2008 second stage at Seibu Dome, the Saitama Seibu Lions' home stadium, they instead held it at Omiya Park Baseball Stadium, a smaller, Saitama-based stadium.
^{c} Due to the COVID-19 pandemic, the 2020 final stage was reduced to a best-of-five series, with the league champion receiving an automatic one-win advantage.

== Reception ==
After being implemented for the 2007 season, the Climax Series drew mixed reviews. The implementation of a unified playoff system in NPB was welcomed by some. Robert Whiting described its creation as "long overdue" and believes it stimulates more interest in Japanese baseball. Japanese baseball writer Asa Satoshi explains that while the system isn't perfect, it reduces the number of throwaway dead rubber games played and its need is reinforced by its popularity with fans. However, Satoshi goes on to question the decision to award the league pennant to the team with the highest winning percentage instead of its Climax Series champion. The decision leads to scenarios where a team can be named the best team in Japan after winning the Japan Series, however at the same time the team wasn't crowned the best team in their respective league. Furthermore, the system allows for teams with sub-.500 winning percentages to qualify for the Climax Series. Satoshi proposes the hypothetical situation in which a team that won less than 50% of their regular-season games wins a Japan Series title and questions if that team could be rightfully named the best in Japan. Others, however, believe that the Climax Series is wholly unnecessary. Former NPB player and coach Katsumi Hirosawa believes that it is unreasonable for a team that overwhelmingly won the regular season to be defeated in the Climax Series, even if that defeat generates excitement. He also argues that a system that allows for half of the teams to advance to the playoffs and potentially win the Japan Series undermines the purpose of a long regular season.

Through the years, various modifications the Climax Series' rules or format have been suggested. To address the matter of lower or losing teams possibly advancing, some have proposed giving the league champion an extra game advantage in the final stage if they won the league by ten or more games or, even stricter, a team would simply be excluded from the postseason if they finished the regular season with a losing record; changes to the final stage were implemented for the 2026 season to address both situations. Others, however, suggest that NPB could instead fundamentally change their league structure and postseason format. Sportswriter Ko Hiroo takes inspiration from MLB's Wild Card Series and proposes that NPB's twelve teams should be restructured from two leagues to three divisions. A new restructured postseason would then have the league winners automatically advancing to the second round along with the winner of a series between two wild card teams that finished the season with the highest winning percentage but did not win a league. Taro Bando, a lecturer at Jumonji University, also suggests restructuring the NPB, however he goes farther by proposing that four new teams should be added to create four divisions allowing for two series between division winners.

When looking at two postseasons, one before and one after the implementation of the Climax Series, Hiroo concludes that the addition of a playoff has had a positive effect on NPB from an entertainment and business perspective. In 2003, with the Japan Series as the only postseason series, only two teams were involved in seven games over ten days that had a total attendance of 286,197 people. In contrast, when both leagues first implemented a playoff system in 2007, six teams were involved in 18 games that spanned 24 days and drew 708,220 people, demonstrating that more fans were engaged with the league for a longer period of time.

Baseball analyst Yusuke Okada believes that Japanese and American baseball fans' perceptions of the postseason differ. He asserts that in the US, the regular season is viewed as a kind of "qualifying round" for the postseason, which is considered the season's "main event". Japanese fans, in contrast, tend to place a higher importance on the results of a long, hard-fought regular season and see it as unfair if the regular season winner is eliminated in a single series prior to the Japan Series. Okada believes the Climax Series strikes a balance between these two completing perspectives while also providing fans with more dramatic baseball.

=== Operational criticisms ===
Various other details in how the system operates has been debated and criticized. The tiebreaker that determines which team moves on to the Climax Series in the event that two teams end the regular season with the same record has also drawn criticism. Currently, the team that finished higher in the league standings the previous season holds an advantage. This contrasts with MLB, which formerly employed a one-game playoff (if only one team advances), or other professional leagues that may use head-to-head season records (and further tiebreakers such as non-interleague play records, second half records, et al.). Former Hiroshima Carp bench coach Jeff Livesey explained that in one instance his team was actually a full game further behind the Hanshin Tigers than the standings showed because unlike the Tigers, the Carp could not enter the Climax Series in the event of a tie. Former player Scott McClain believes that "[the tiebreaker] should have nothing to do with last year", pointing out that players and managers change from year to year. The Japan Times columnist Wayne Graczyk has suggested that this format be scrapped in favor of MLB's one-game playoff.

The most scrutinized aspect of the Climax Series is the one-game advantage that is awarded to the regular-season champions for the final stage. When the rule was implemented for the 2008 Climax Series, many players reacted negatively with some describing the rule as "unfair", "bad", "bull" and "messed up". Former player and current manager Alex Ramírez, however, believed that the league champion deserves the advantage. The Japan Times columnist Jason Coskrey believes that the "phantom win" gives the pennant winner too much of an advantage. According to him, the first stage bye plus all home games during the final stage should be advantage enough for the top-seeded team. He describes the situation as NPB "trying to have its cake and eat it too" by trying to reap the benefits of a playoff system while also trying to maintain the traditional showdown of pennant winners in the Japan Series. Looking back over the first ten years of the Climax Series, Satoshi believed that it was an ideal form postseason entertainment. Through that time, the league champion won the Climax Series and advanced to the Japan Series almost 82% of the time. He believed this to be the right balance as it maintained the importance of the regular season while also allowing for an occasional surprise that excited fans.

In 2017, the system again drew criticism, this time for allowing games to be called early because of weather and treating them as official games (postseason games in North America's Major League Baseball since 2009 must be played to the full nine innings). After the Yokohama DeNA BayStars lost a 5-inning game in the 2017 Central League Climax Series, Coskrey wrote that playoff games should never end in that manner. He suggested that NPB could have easily suspended the game and resumed where it left off the next day or even postponed the game entirely until the next day. Similarly, in an article for Yahoo Sports, Craig Calcaterra called the Climax Series "super unfair" after the incident and imagined a similar hypothetical situation in the MLB playoffs and concluded that fans would "riot".

== See also ==
- Major League Baseball postseason
