= Nippon Professional Baseball playoffs =

Japanese baseball competition

- Pacific League playoff formats
- 1950–1972: none, pennant winner advances
- (experimental round-robin used in 1952)
- 1973–1982: split season
- 1983–1985: ≤5 games separation
- 1986–2003: none, pennant winner advances
- 2004–2006: three-team playoff
- 2007–present: Climax Series
- Central League playoff formats
- 1950–2006: none, pennant winner advances
- 2007–present: Climax Series
- NPB championship
- 1950–present: Japan Series

The Nippon Professional Baseball (NPB) playoffs have taken several different forms throughout the organization's history. Japanese baseball is divided into two leagues; the Pacific League (PL) is less popular and less profitable than the Central League (CL). As a result, the PL has employed various playoff formats throughout its history in an effort to increase fan interest. The PL's first true playoff system was introduced in the 1973 season. It involved a split season plan that divided the season into two halves and the two teams that won each half went on to play each other in a five-game playoff series, with the winner advancing to the Japan Series. While popular with fans, the format was scrapped after ten seasons because of major issues and criticisms. In the year following their last split season, the PL returned to a single season, however if five or fewer games separated the first- and second-place teams at the end of the season, the two teams would play each other in a five-game playoff series. This playoff system was unpopular and ridiculed by media and fans. It only lasted three seasons with a playoff series never needing to be played.

With their first two playoff systems abolished, the Pacific League returned to simply advancing their regular-season champion directly to the Japan Series. During this time, the PL's Seibu Lions won six Japan Series championship titles in seven seasons from the mid-1980s to the early-1990s. After the fall of the Lions in the mid-1990s, the league struggled to win championships against the Central League and lost three consecutive Japan Series to start the 2000s. Again fighting for its survival as its popularity faded, the PL board of directors agreed to reintroduce a playoff system to be used in the 2004 season to potentially create more regular-season excitement. The new postseason plan initiated a two-stage playoff in which the top three PL teams competed. In the First Stage, the teams that finished the season with the second- and third-best records played each other in a best-of-three series. The winner of this series faced the league's top finisher in the second, best-of-five stage. The winner of the Second Stage advanced to the Japan Series, where they competed against the CL's regular-season champion. After two years, the rules were changed to award the first-place team an automatic one-win advantage in the Second Stage. Though Central League officials initially criticized the plan, the PL's playoffs were a success and soon after the CL was criticized for not implementing a playoff system of their own.

Unlike the Pacific League, the Central League had never experimented with any type of postseason system prior to 2006. They had situational playoff scenarios written into its bylaws in the event of an end-of-season tie, however, it never occurred and a permanent playoff plan had never been created. In 2006, encouraged by the success of the PL's postseason system, CL officials announced their intention to introduce playoffs for the 2007 season to help boost declining attendance. Later that year, PL and CL officials agreed on a unified postseason system. The CL implemented a playoff system identical to the PL's, and the entire playoff series was dubbed the Climax Series, NPB's current playoff format. The PL agreed to name the regular-season first-place finishers league champions rather than the team that won the leagues' respective playoffs—a reversal from the previous three seasons. The two leagues also agreed that neither regular-season champion should receive a one-game advantage in the Final Stage of the Climax Series. However, after one season, the leagues overturned their decision on the Final Stage advantage and agreed to award their champions a one-win advantage in the Final Stage starting with the 2008 Climax Series. At the same time, the Final Stage changed from a best-of-five series and became a best-of-seven series, where the first team to accumulate four wins advances to the Japan Series.

== Pacific League playoffs ==
The Pacific League (PL) first experimented with a type of end-of-season playoff system during the 1952 season. After the 108-game season had concluded, the teams with the four best winning percentages qualified to play in a twelve-game round robin stage in which each team would play three games against the other three qualifying teams. The results of these games were then added to the teams' regular-season results to determine the league's champion. After all 120 games had concluded, the Mainichi Orions and the Nankai Hawks both had 75 wins, however the Hawks had one less loss than the Orions because of a game against the Daiei Stars that ended in a tie earlier in the season. Because of the impact the tie had on the pennant race, the Hawks and the Stars played an extra 121st game. The Hawks won the game, giving them sole claim to Pacific League title and the right to represent the PL in the Japan Series. After the season, this faux playoff system was abandoned because of criticism that it was unfair to the three non-qualifying teams that had their seasons truncated.

=== Split season (1973–1982) ===
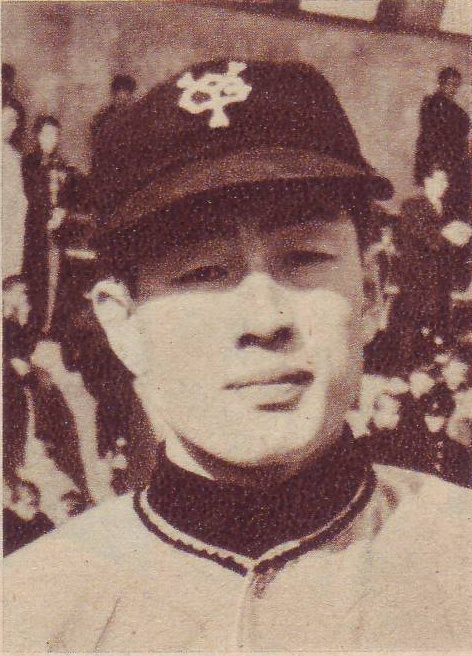
Tatsuro Hirooka, the Seibu Lions' manager during the split-season format's final season, heavily criticized the playoff system.

During the Pacific League owners' meeting on November 20, 1972, a split season plan that included a potential genuine playoff series was approved for the 1973 season. Less popular and less profitable than Nippon Professional Baseball's (NPB) other league, the Central League (CL), the PL hoped that the new format would significantly increase fan interest. The season was divided into two, 65-game halves. The two teams that won each half went on to play each other in a five-game playoff series. The winner of the series was named the PL champion and went on to play the Central League (CL) champion in the Japan Series.

Playoff games under the split-season format were commercially successful and often played to sold-out crowds, a rare occurrence during the Pacific League's regular season. The format, however, had several problems and criticisms. While it did create two potential playoff races in one season, dead rubber games that had no playoff implications still resulted once a team clinched each half-season title. Furthermore, it allowed a team with only the third-best winning percentage for the full season to reach the playoffs and the Japan Series. The Seibu Lions' manager during the split-season format's final season, Tatsuro Hirooka, heavily criticized the playoff system for this reason. He believed teams could potentially abuse the format by focusing on the first half alone instead of the full season. Then, once a team became the first-half champion, it could rest players during the second half as their playoff berth had already been guaranteed. Another problem specific to the split-season format is that the playoff series was cancelled if one team won both half seasons. This occurred twice in the 1976 and 1978 seasons. These issues led to the format being scrapped after ten years and replaced for the 1983 season.

==== Results ====
In the 1973 season, the first year the system was implemented, the Nankai Hawks clinched a playoff berth by winning the first half of the season, however they finished the full season with only the third-best winning percentage in the league. It was the only example during the split-season era in which a team without the top-two highest winning percentages won the playoff series and advanced to the Japan Series. In the 1976 and 1978 seasons, the Hankyu Braves won both half-seasons nullifying the need for playoff series. Of the eight playoff series that were played, the first-half champion won five of them.

Pacific League Playoff results (1973–1982)
Year	First-half champion	Record	Second-half champion	Most Valuable Player	Fighting Spirit Award
1973	Nankai Hawks*	2–1	Hankyu Braves	Michio Sato	Taira Sumitomo
1974	Hankyu Braves	0–3	**Lotte Orions***	Choji Murata	Tokuji Nagaike
1975	**Hankyu Braves***	3–1	Kintetsu Buffaloes	Tokuji Nagaike	Arita Shuzo
1976	Playoff series was not needed because the Hankyu Braves won both half-seasons				
1977	**Hankyu Braves***	3–2	Lotte Orions	Hisashi Yamada	Masaharu Mitsui
1978	Playoff series was not needed because the Hankyu Braves won both half-seasons				
1979	Kintetsu Buffaloes*	3–0	Hankyu Braves	Tetsuji Yamaguchi	Mitsuo Inaba
1980	Lotte Orions	0–3	Kintetsu Buffaloes*	Mitsuyasu Hirano	Michiyo Arito
1981	Lotte Orions	1–1–3	Nippon-Ham Fighters*	Junichi Kashiwabara	Choji Murata
1982	**Seibu Lions***	3–1	Nippon-Ham Fighters	Takuji Ota	Mikio Kudo

* The team won the series to become the Pacific League champion and advanced to the Japan Series.
BOLD: The team went on to win the Japan Series.

=== Five-or-fewer games separation (1983–1985) ===
In 1983, the PL returned to a single, 130-game season, however if five or fewer games separated the first- and second-place teams at the end of the season, the two teams would play each other in a playoff series. The winner of the five-game series would be named the League champion and represent the PL in the Japan Series. This implemented a playoff system that was unpopular and uniformly ridiculed by most baseball media and fans. While the system removed the possibility of a team with a low regular-season winning percentage advancing to the Japan Series, it also removed the excitement of a close pennant race near the end of the season. It forced a winning team that narrowly beat its second-place competitor to try and defeat them again in a playoff series. The system only lasted for three seasons with a playoff series never needing to be played.

=== Playoffs (2004–2006) ===
After the Pacific League abolished their first two playoff systems, the league returned to simply advancing their regular-season champion directly to the Japan Series. In this era before interleague play, the Pacific and Central Leagues vied for supremacy via the Japan Series. From the mid-1980s to the early-1990s, the PL's Seibu Lions entered their "Golden Age", winning six Japan Series titles in seven seasons. After the fall of the Lions in the mid-1990s, the Pacific League struggled to win championships against the Central League. To start the 2000s, the PL lost three consecutive Japan Series and was fighting for its survival as its popularity faded. When a first-place team had a substantial lead in the standings near the end of a regular season, there was no pennant race leading up to the Japan Series and fan interest and excitement waned. In an attempt to rectify this problem and increase the league's overall popularity, the PL board of directors agreed to reintroduce a playoff system to be used in the 2004 season to potentially create more regular-season excitement. The new postseason plan initiated a two-stage playoff in which the top three PL teams competed. In the First Stage, the teams that finished the newly shortened, 135-game regular season with the second- and third-best records played each other in a best-of-three series. The winner of this series faced the league's top finisher in the second, final stage. The Second Stage winner advanced to the Japan Series, where they competed against the CL's regular-season champion. Games could end in a tie if there was no winner after twelve innings. In a case that resulted in a series tie, the team that had the better head-to-head regular-season record advanced. The winner of the playoff series was named the Pacific League champion instead of the team that finished the regular season in first place. After the announcement, CL officials criticized the plan, with Giants' owner Tsuneo Watanabe going as far as to proclaim that if the PL team that placed third during the regular season advanced to the Japan Series, his team would refuse to play in the Series.

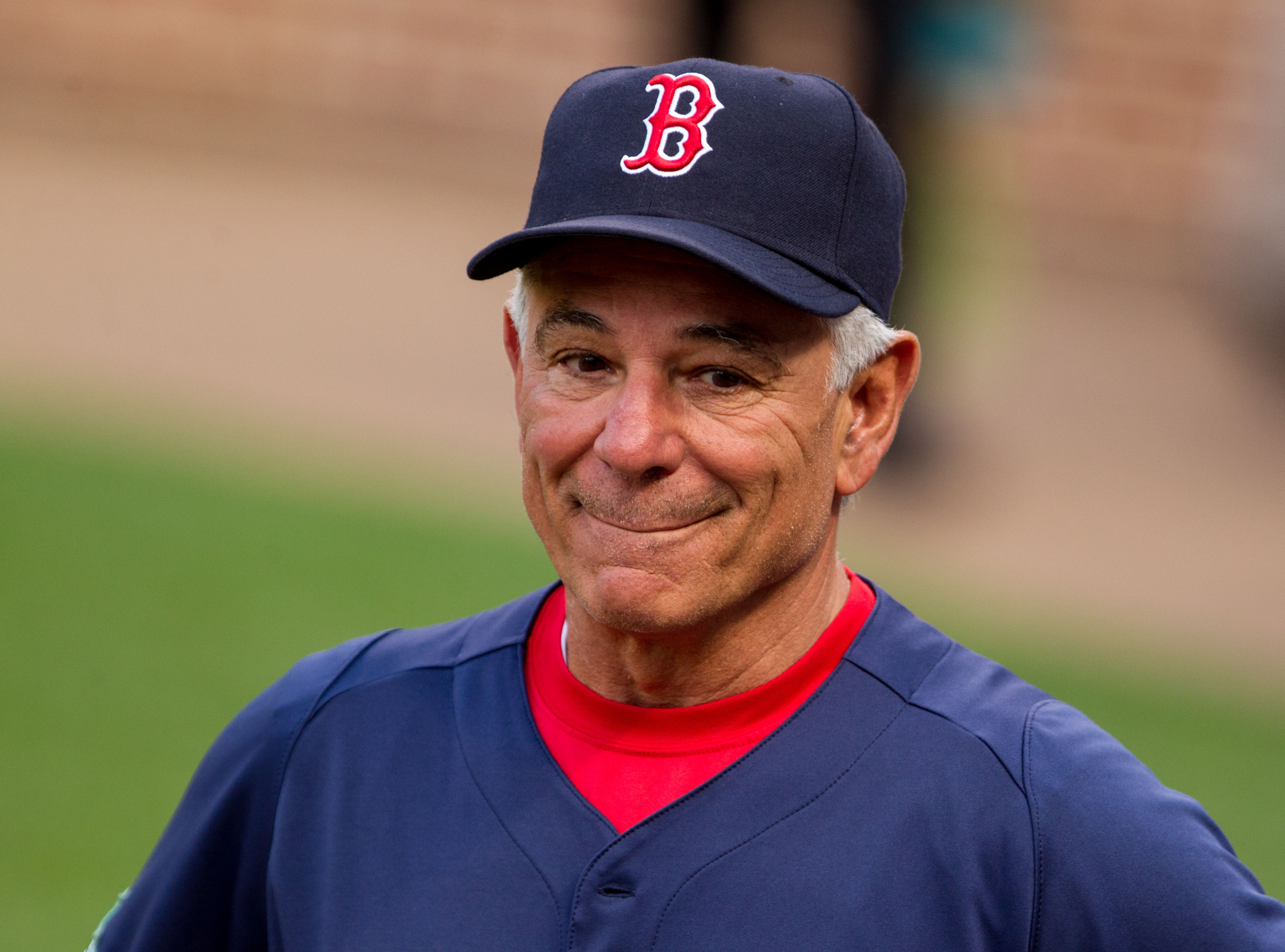
Bobby Valentine, former manager of the Chiba Lotte Marines, praised the Pacific League's playoff system after managing in it.

Originally, the first-place team at the end of the season was only supposed to receive home-field advantage throughout the Second Stage's best-of-five series. However, in August 2003, PL officials announced that if that team led the second-place team by more than five games at the end of the season, the top team would also receive a one-game winning advantage in addition to home-field advantage in the Second Stage. The first two years of this playoff system resulted in the first-place Fukuoka SoftBank Hawks missing out on the one-game advantage in the Second Stage by only a half game both seasons and losing both series as a result. Frustrated, SoftBank appealed to PL officials to revisit the rules. As a result, the PL removed the five-game lead requirement for the 2006 playoffs in favor of automatically awarding the first-place team the one-win advantage. In conjunction with this change, the first-place team no longer had home-field advantage for the entirety of the Second Stage; instead, the remaining four games were to be split evenly between both teams' stadiums. The venue rule change was a non-factor as the eventual first-place Hokkaido Nippon-Ham Fighters clinched a Japan Series berth in two straight Second-Stage games against SoftBank with the help of the unconditional one-win advantage that the Hawks had helped to install.

During the three years of the PL's playoff system, the winner of the PL's postseason tournament competed against the CL team who finished the regular season with the best record. The disparity between the two leagues' postseasons provoked some criticism from baseball analysts and insiders. During the 2005 Japan Series, The Japan Times' Stephen Ellsesser called NPB's unbalanced postseason a "bad system" and believed that the CL's decision to not implement a playoff system of their own was "foolish". Citing the Hanshin Tigers' poor Japan Series performance, he speculated that the CL's lack of postseason play was a disadvantage. Ellsesser believed that the 17 days between their last regular-season game and the first Japan Series game did nothing to prepare the Tigers for the eventual championship series against the Chiba Lotte Marines, who had played continuously. Like Ellsesser, after seeing the "excitement" that the 2004 PL Playoffs caused, then-Marines manager Bobby Valentine was "incredulous that the Central League didn’t follow suit" and create a playoff series of their own.

The second stage of this playoff format was used in the 2020 season as a result of the COVID-19 pandemic.

==== Results ====
The first two years of the Pacific League Playoffs both saw the second-seeded team winning both Stages and advancing on to the Japan Series. In the third and final year, the third-seeded Hawks won the First Stage. With the Second Stage rules changed to grant the top-seeded Fighters a one-win advantage, the Fighters were the first top-seeded team to win the Pacific League title during this playoff plan.

Pacific League Playoff results (2004–2006)
Year	Stage	Stadium	Winning team	Record	Losing team	Notes
2004	First	Seibu Dome	**Seibu Lions**	2–1	Hokkaido Nippon-Ham Fighters	
2004	Second	Fukuoka Dome	**Seibu Lions**	3–2	Fukuoka Daiei Hawks	
2005	First	Chiba Marine Stadium	**Chiba Lotte Marines**	2–0	Seibu Lions	
2005	Second	Fukuoka Yahoo! Japan Dome	**Chiba Lotte Marines**	3–2	Fukuoka SoftBank Hawks	
2006	First	Invoice Seibu Dome	Fukuoka SoftBank Hawks	2–1	Seibu Lions	
2006	Second	Sapporo Dome^{†}	**Hokkaido Nippon-Ham Fighters**	3–0	Fukuoka SoftBank Hawks	

Bold The team won the Second Stage to become the Pacific League champion and advance to the Japan Series.
^†For 2006 Pacific League Playoffs, instead of the top-seeded team having home-field advantage for the entirety of the Second Stage, the rules were changed to award the top seed a one-win advantage while the remaining four games were split evenly between both teams' stadiums; the Hokkaido Nippon-Ham Fighters won the Stage in two games, removing the need for games three or four to be played at the Fukuoka Yahoo! Japan Dome.

== Climax Series (2007–present) ==
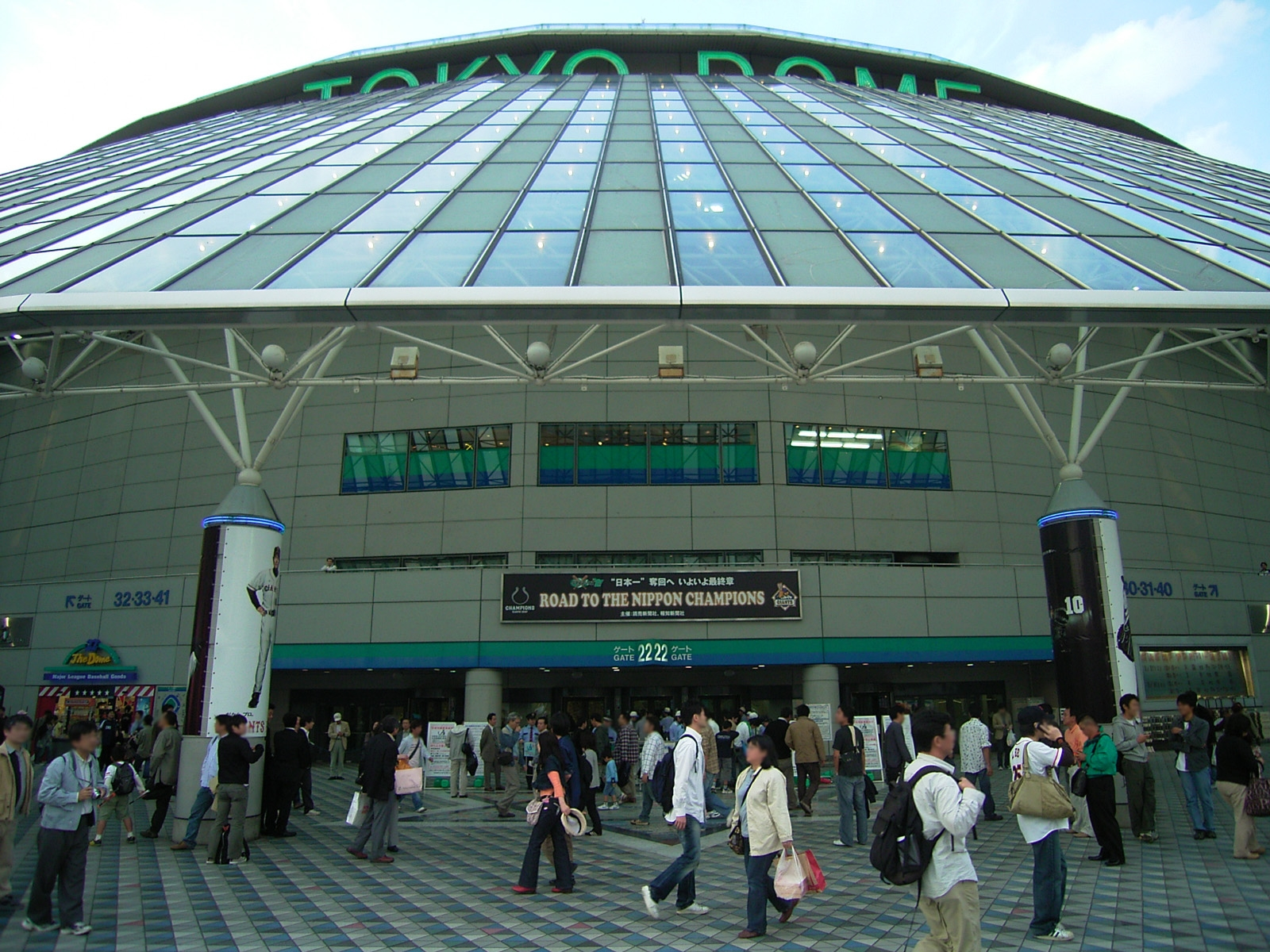
The Tokyo Dome, home of the Yomiuri Giants, hosted the Second Stage of the inaugural Central League Climax Series.

Unlike the Pacific League, the Central League had never experimented with any type of postseason system prior to 2006. The CL had situational playoff scenarios written into its bylaws that required either a tie atop the standings or a team finishing with more wins but a worse winning percentage than the first-place team, but a permanent playoff plan had never been created. In March 2006, encouraged by the success of the PL's postseason system, CL officials announced their intention to introduce playoffs for the 2007 season to help boost declining attendance. During meetings held later that year, PL and CL officials disagreed over proposed plans detailing the new playoff system. Since the creation of the PL playoffs in 2004, the league awarded its pennant titles to the playoff winners rather than the team who finished the regular season with the best record. The PL disapproved of the CL's intentions to continue awarding their league title to the first-place finisher in the regular season while using the playoffs to determine which team would compete against in the Japan Series.

In September 2006, both leagues agreed on a unified postseason system. The CL implemented a playoff system identical to the PL's, and the entire playoff series was dubbed the "Climax Series". The PL agreed to name the regular season first-place finishers league champions rather than the team that won the leagues' respective playoffs—a reversal from the previous three seasons. It was decided that both leagues would play 144 regular-season games, the first time both leagues would play the same number of games since the PL introduced its playoff system in 2004. The two leagues also agreed that neither regular-season champion should receive a one-game advantage in the Final Stage of the Climax Series, claiming that it was unnecessary from a business point of view. It had been suggested that the Yomiuri Giants voted to approve the playoff idea in 2006 because they had not finished atop the standings in the regular season since 2002 and the playoff concept would increase the Giants' chances of winning the Japan Series. However, the plan backfired on them. In the Climax Series' inaugural season, the Giants finally won the CL pennant but were still denied a Japan Series berth when they were defeated by the second-place Chunichi Dragons in a three-game sweep during the Final Stage of the 2007 Central League Climax Series. The next season, the leagues overturned their decision on the Final Stage advantage and agreed to award their champions an automatic one-win advantage in the Final Stage starting with the 2008 Climax Series. At the same time, the Final Stage changed from a best-of-five series and became a best-of-seven series, where the first team to accumulate four wins advances to the Japan Series.

In 2026, a new rule is applied to the Final Stage. If the pennant winner leads the other team by 10 games, or if the other team had a losing regular season record, then the pennant winner will instead receive two-win advantage, and the series will instead become a best-of-nine series, where the first team to accumulate five wins advances to the Japan Series.

== See also ==
- Major League Baseball postseason
