= 2007 Nippon Professional Baseball season =

2007 NPB season
- League: Nippon Professional Baseball
- Sport: Baseball
- Duration: March 24 – November 1

Central League pennant
- League champions: Yomiuri Giants
- Runners-up: Chunichi Dragons
- Season MVP: Michihiro Ogasawara (Yomiuri)

Pacific League pennant
- League champions: Hokkaido Nippon-Ham Fighters
- Runners-up: Chiba Lotte Marines
- Season MVP: Yu Darvish (Nippon Ham)

Climax Series
- CL champions: Chunichi Dragons
- CL runners-up: Yomiuri Giants
- PL champions: Hokkaido Nippon-Ham Fighters
- PL runners-up: Chiba Lotte Marines

Japan Series
- Venue: Sapporo Dome, Sapporo, Hokkaidō; Vantelin Dome Nagoya, Nagoya, Aichi
- Champions: Chunichi Dragons
- Runners-up: Hokkaido Nippon-Ham Fighters
- Finals MVP: Norihiro Nakamura (Chunichi)

NPB seasons
- ← 2006 2008 →

The 2007 Nippon Professional Baseball season was the 58th season since the NPB was reorganized in 1950 and the first to feature the Climax Series.

== Regular season ==
=== Standings ===
==== Central League ====
2007 Central League standings
Team	Pld	W	L	T	PCT	GB
Yomiuri Giants	144	80	63	1	.559	—
Chunichi Dragons	144	78	64	2	.549	1.5
Hanshin Tigers	144	74	66	4	.528	4.5
Yokohama BayStars	144	71	72	1	.497	9
Hiroshima Toyo Carp	144	60	82	2	.424	19.5
Tokyo Yakult Swallows	144	60	84	0	.417	20.5

==== Pacific League ====
2007 Pacific League standings
Team	Pld	W	L	T	PCT	GB
Hokkaido Nippon-Ham Fighters	144	79	60	5	.566	—
Chiba Lotte Marines	144	76	61	7	.552	2
Fukuoka SoftBank Hawks	144	73	66	5	.524	6
Tohoku Rakuten Golden Eagles	144	67	75	2	.472	13.5
Seibu Lions	144	66	76	2	.465	14.5
Orix Buffaloes	144	62	77	5	.448	17

== Climax Series ==
Climax Series was firstly introduced in this season. It was inspired by the playoff system introduced by Pacific League between 2004 and 2006, in which the top three teams of the league will play in a stepladder knockout to decide the team to play in the Japan Series. The system was a success when Pacific League's teams won all the Japan Series since the introduction of such system. This is also the Central League's first participation in playoff system since 1949.

Climax Series does not affect the team's standings, nor individual's record in the regular season.

First stage
Central League
2	Chunichi Dragons	2
3	Hanshin Tigers	0
Pacific League
2	Chiba Lotte Marines	2
3	Fukuoka SoftBank Hawks	1

Final stage
1	Yomiuri Giants	0
2	Chunichi Dragons	3
1	Hokkaido Nippon-Ham Fighters	3
2	Chiba Lotte Marines	2

Japan Series
C2	Chunichi Dragons	4
P1	Hokkaido Nippon-Ham Fighters	1

- – Chunichi Dragons advances to 2007 Konami Cup

== Leaders ==
=== Batting ===
Central League

Statistic	Leader	Team	Result
Batting average	Norichika Aoki	Tokyo Yakult Swallows	.327
Runs	Norichika Aoki	Tokyo Yakult Swallows	114
Hits	Alex Ramirez	Tokyo Yakult Swallows	204*
Doubles	Alex Ramirez	Tokyo Yakult Swallows	41
Triples	Hiroyasu Tanaka	Tokyo Yakult Swallows	8
Home runs	Shuichi Murata	Yokohama BayStars	36
Runs batted in	Alex Ramirez	Tokyo Yakult Swallows	122
Stolen bases	Masahiro Araki	Chunichi Dragons	31
Walks	Tyrone Woods	Chunichi Dragons	121

*indicates league record

Pacific League

Statistic	Leader	Team	Result
Batting average	Atsunori Inaba	Hokkaido Nippon-Ham Fighters	.334
Runs	Hichori Morimoto	Hokkaido Nippon-Ham Fighters	91
Hits	Atsunori Inaba	Hokkaido Nippon-Ham Fighters	176
Doubles	Atsunori Inaba	Hokkaido Nippon-Ham Fighters	39
Triples	Daisuke Hayakawa	Chiba Lotte Marines	8
Home runs	Takeshi Yamasaki	Rakuten Golden Eagles	43
Runs batted in	Takeshi Yamasaki	Rakuten Golden Eagles	108
Stolen bases	Yasuyuki Kataoka	Seibu Lions	38
Walks	Tuffy Rhodes	Orix Buffaloes	88

== Awards ==
=== Best Nine Awards ===
Central League

Position	Player	Team
P	Hisanori Takahashi	Yomiuri Giants
C	Shinnosuke Abe	Yomiuri Giants
1B	Tyrone Woods	Chunichi Dragons
2B	Hiroyasu Tanaka	Tokyo Yakult Swallows
3B	Michihiro Ogasawara	Yomiuri Giants
SS	Hirokazu Ibata	Chunichi Dragons
OF	Norichika Aoki	Tokyo Yakult Swallows
OF	Alex Ramirez	Tokyo Yakult Swallows
OF	Yoshinobu Takahashi	Yomiuri Giants

Pacific League

Position	Player	Team
P	Yu Darvish	Hokkaido Nippon-Ham Fighters
C	Tomoya Satozaki	Chiba Lotte Marines
1B	Alex Cabrera	Seibu Lions
2B	Kensuke Tanaka	Hokkaido Nippon-Ham Fighters
3B	Greg LaRocca	Orix Buffaloes
SS	Tsuyoshi Nishioka	Chiba Lotte Marines
OF	Atsunori Inaba	Hokkaido Nippon-Ham Fighters
OF	Hichori Morimoto	Hokkaido Nippon-Ham Fighters
OF	Naoyuki Ohmura	Fukuoka SoftBank Hawks
DH	Takeshi Yamasaki	Tohoku Rakuten Golden Eagles

=== Gold Gloves ===
Central League

Position	Player	Team
P	Kenshin Kawakami	Chunichi Dragons
C	Motonobu Tanishige	Chunichi Dragons
1B	Andy Sheets	Hanshin Tigers
2B	Masahiro Araki	Chunichi Dragons
3B	Norihiro Nakamura	Chunichi Dragons
SS	Hirokazu Ibata	Chunichi Dragons
OF	Tatsuhiko Kinjo	Yokohama BayStars
OF	Norichika Aoki	Tokyo Yakult Swallows
OF	Yoshinobu Takahashi	Yomiuri Giants

Pacific League

Position	Player	Team
P	Yu Darvish	Hokkaido Nippon-Ham Fighters
C	Tomoya Satozaki	Chiba Lotte Marines
1B	Kazuya Fukuura	Chiba Lotte Marines
2B	Kensuke Tanaka	Hokkaido Nippon-Ham Fighters
3B	Toshiaki Imae	Chiba Lotte Marines
SS	Tsuyoshi Nishioka	Chiba Lotte Marines
OF	Atsunori Inaba	Hokkaido Nippon-Ham Fighters
OF	Hichori Morimoto	Hokkaido Nippon-Ham Fighters
OF	Saburo Ohmura	Chiba Lotte Marines

== See also ==
- 2007 Korea Professional Baseball season
- 2007 Major League Baseball season
