= Takeshi Yamasaki =

Japanese baseball player (born 1968)

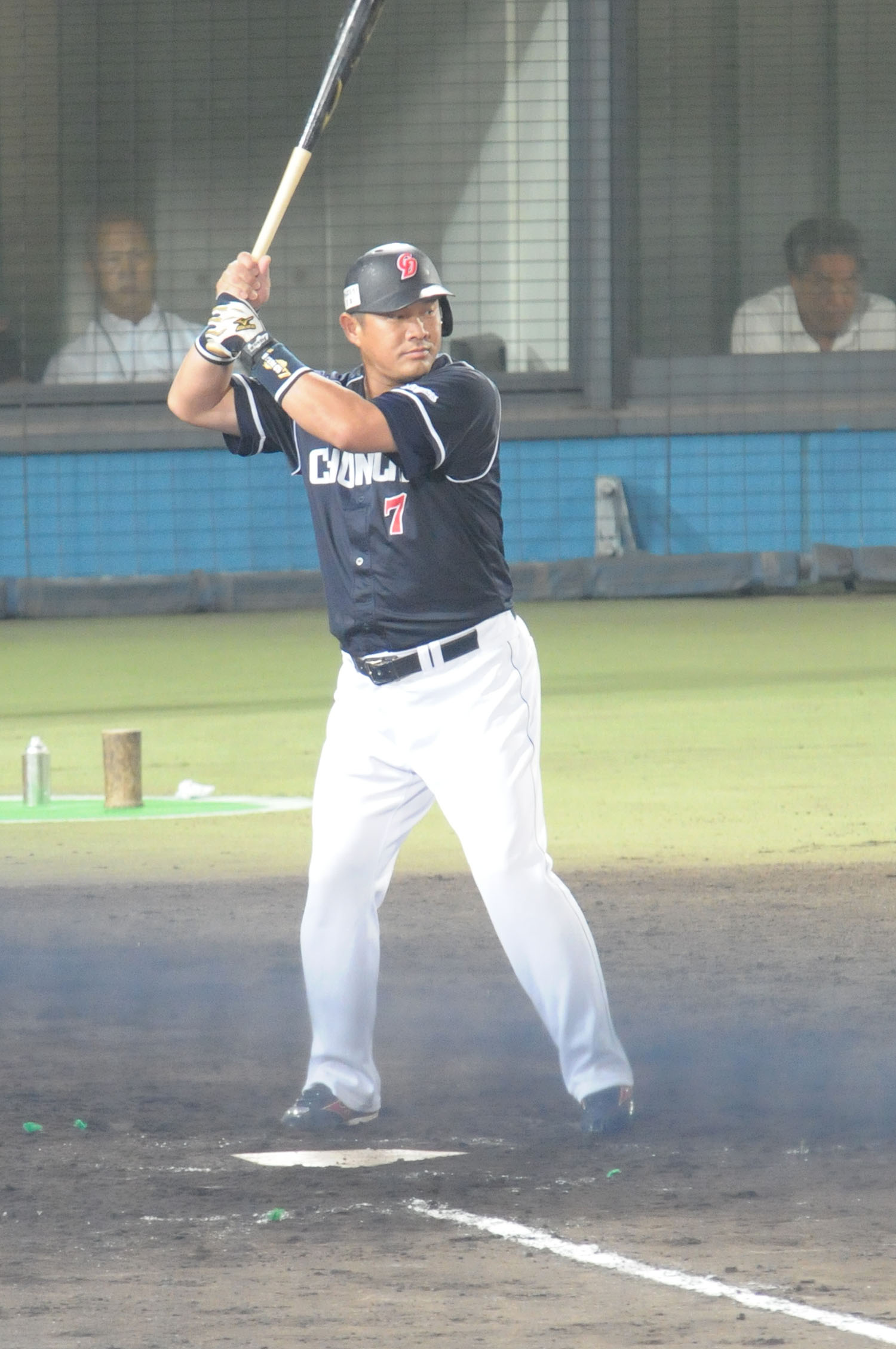
- First baseman, outfielder
- Born: November 7, 1968 (age 57); Aichi, Japan
- Batted: Right Threw: Right

NPB debut
- September 7, 1989, for the Chunichi Dragons

Last appearance
- 2013, for the Chunichi Dragons

NPB statistics (through 2013 season)
- Batting average: .257
- Hits: 1,834
- HRs: 403
- RBIs: 1,205
- Stats at Baseball Reference

Teams
- Chunichi Dragons (1989 – 2002); Orix BlueWave (2003 – 2004); Tohoku Rakuten Golden Eagles (2005 – 2011); Chunichi Dragons (2012 – 2013)

Career highlights and awards
- 6× All-Star (1996, 2000, 2007, 2008, 2010, 2011); 2× Leader of Home Run (1996, 2007); 1× Leader of RBI (2007); 3× Central League Best Nine Award (1996, 2007, 2009); 2× NPB All-Star Game MVP (2000, 2008)

Takeshi Yamasaki (山﨑 武司, Yamasaki Takeshi; born November 7, 1968, in Chita, Aichi, Japan) is a retired Japanese professional baseball player. During his 24 seasons in Nippon Professional Baseball, he played for the Chunichi Dragons, the Orix BlueWave, and the Tohoku Rakuten Golden Eagles.

== Career ==
Yamasaki was selected at the number 2 draft pick for the Dragons in 1987. He helped lead the Dragons to the 1999 Japan Series (which they ultimately lost to the Fukuoka Daiei Hawks, 4-games-to-1).

On April 1, 2007, José Fernández and Yamasaki hit grand slams in the same inning for the Tohoku Rakuten Golden Eagles. Yamasaki led the Pacific League in home runs and RBI in 2007, also being selected for a Best Nine Award as a designated hitter.

Yamasaki was the MVP of the 2008 All Star Game #1. He had 2 home runs in the 2009 Climax Series.

Yamasaki was awarded the 2011 Golden Spirit Award, given to a NPB player who "best exemplifies the game of baseball, sportsmanship, community involvement and the individual's contribution to his team", as voted on by members of the media.

Yamasaki played 24 years in NPB, retiring after the 2013 season with 403 home runs, placing him 17th all-time in Japanese professional baseball.

== List ==
- List of top Nippon Professional Baseball home run hitters
- List of Nippon Professional Baseball players with 1,000 runs batted in
