= 2007 Central League Climax Series =

First stage
Team (Wins)		Manager	Season
Chunichi Dragons (2)		Hiromitsu Ochiai	78–64–2 (.549), 1.5 GB
Hanshin Tigers (0)		Akinobu Okada	74–66–4 (.529), 4.5 GB
- Dates: October 13–14

Second stage
Team (Wins)		Manager	Season
Chunichi Dragons (3)		Hiromitsu Ochiai	78–64–2 (.549), 1.5 GB
Yomiuri Giants (0)		Tatsunori Hara	80–63–1 (.559), 1.5 GA
- Dates: October 18–20

The 2007 Central League Climax Series (CLCS) was the opening round of the Central League side of the 2007 NPB postseason to end the 2007 Nippon Professional Baseball season. The inaugural edition consisted of two consecutive series of baseball games, in which Stage 1 was a best-of-three series and Stage 2 was a best-of-five. The winner of the series advanced to the 2007 Japan Series, where they competed against the 2007 Pacific League Climax Series (PLCS) winner. The top three regular-season finishers played in the two series. The CLCS began with the first game of Stage 1 on October 13 and ended with the final game of Stage 2 on October 20. The following year saw the institution of a one-win advantage for the regular season champion that meant the First Stage winner would need to win four of six games to advance to the Japan Series.

== First stage ==
=== Summary ===
Chunichi Dragons won the series, 2–0.

Game	Date	Score	Location	Time	Attendance
1	October 13	Hanshin Tigers – 0, Chunichi Dragons – 7	Nagoya Dome	3:25	38,385
2	October 14	Hanshin Tigers – 3, Chunichi Dragons – 5	Nagoya Dome	3:14	38,275

=== Game 1 ===
Saturday, October 13, 2007, 6:01 pm (JST) at Nagoya Dome in Nagoya, Aichi Prefecture
Team	1	2	3	4	5	6	7	8	9	R	H	E
Hanshin	0	0	0	0	0	0	0	0	0	0	5	1
Chunichi	3	0	0	0	0	4	0	0	X	7	13	0
WP: Kenshin Kawakami (1–0) LP: Tsuyoshi Shimoyanagi (0–1); Home runs: HAN: None; CHU: Tyrone Woods (1), Masahiko Morino (1)

=== Game 2 ===
Sunday, October 14, 2007, 6:00 pm (JST) at Nagoya Dome in Nagoya Dome in Nagoya, Aichi Prefecture
Team	1	2	3	4	5	6	7	8	9	R	H	E
Hanshin	0	0	0	1	0	0	0	2	0	3	8	0
Chunichi	5	0	0	0	0	0	0	0	X	5	8	0
WP: Kenichi Nakata (1–0) LP: Keiji Uezono (0–1) Sv: Hitoki Iwase (1); Home runs: HAN: None; CHU: Lee Byung-Kyu (1)

== Second stage ==
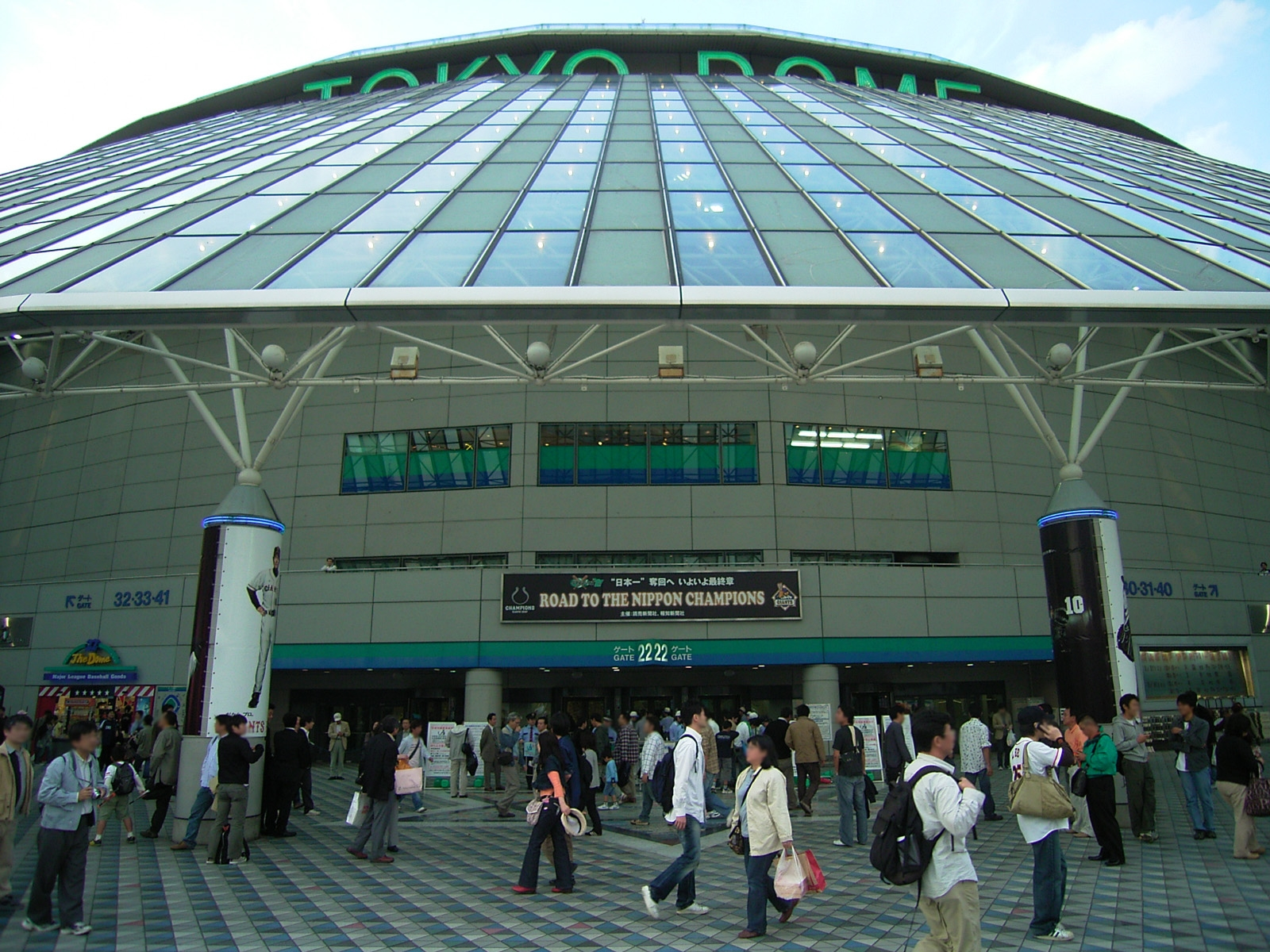
The Yomiuri Giants hosted the Chunichi Dragons for all three Stage-2 games in the Tokyo Dome.

=== Summary ===
Chunichi Dragons won the series, 3–0.

Game	Date	Score	Location	Time	Attendance
1	October 18	Chunichi Dragons – 5, Yomiuri Giants – 2	Tokyo Dome	3:48	44,232
2	October 19	Chunichi Dragons – 7, Yomiuri Giants – 4	Tokyo Dome	3:49	45,074
3	October 20	Chunichi Dragons – 4, Yomiuri Giants – 2	Tokyo Dome	3:17	46,081

=== Game 1 ===
Thursday, October 18, 2007, 6:00 pm (JST) at Tokyo Dome in Bunkyō, Tokyo
Team	1	2	3	4	5	6	7	8	9	R	H	E
Chunichi	0	0	2	2	0	0	0	1	0	5	9	0
Yomiuri	0	0	0	0	1	1	0	0	0	2	8	2
WP: Takashi Ogasawara (1–0) LP: Tetsuya Utsumi (0–1) Sv: Hitoki Iwase (1); Home runs: CHU: Tyrone Woods (1); YOM: Yoshitomo Tani (1)

=== Game 2 ===
Friday, October 19, 2007, 6:00 pm (JST) at Tokyo Dome in Bunkyō, Tokyo
Team	1	2	3	4	5	6	7	8	9	R	H	E
Chunichi	0	1	0	2	0	0	3	0	1	7	14	1
Yomiuri	1	0	0	0	0	0	3	0	0	4	7	0
WP: Kenshin Kawakami (1–0) LP: Hiroshi Kisanuki (0–1) Sv: Hitoki Iwase (2); Home runs: CHU: Lee Byung-Kyu (1); YOM: Damon Hollins (1)

=== Game 3 ===
Saturday, October 20, 2007, 6:00 pm (JST) at Tokyo Dome in Bunkyō, Tokyo
Team	1	2	3	4	5	6	7	8	9	R	H	E
Chunichi	0	0	0	3	0	0	1	0	0	4	6	0
Yomiuri	0	1	0	1	0	0	0	0	0	2	7	0
WP: Kenichi Nakata (1–0) LP: Hisanori Takahashi (0–1) Sv: Hitoki Iwase (3); Home runs: CHU: Tyrone Woods (2), Motonobu Tanishige (1); YOM: Tomohiro Nioka (1)
