= 2006 Pacific League Playoffs =

Japanese baseball series

First stage
Team (Wins)		Manager	Season
Fukuoka SoftBank Hawks (2)		Sadaharu Oh	75–56–5 (.573), 4.5 GB
Seibu Lions (1)		Tsutomu Ito	80–54–2 (.597), 1 GB
- Dates: October 7–9

Second stage
Team (Wins)		Manager	Season
Hokkaido Nippon-Ham Fighters (3)		Trey Hillman	82–54 (.603), 1 GA
Fukuoka SoftBank Hawks (0)		Sadaharu Oh	75–56–5 (.573), 4.5 GB
- Dates: October 11–12

The 2006 Pacific League Playoffs was a set of consecutive playoff series for the Pacific League of Nippon Professional Baseball (NPB) in the 2006 season. The following year, both the Central and Pacific League would have a unified playoff system with three teams each in competition to reach the Japan Series, with the resulting name being the Climax Series.

== First stage ==
=== Summary ===
Fukuoka SoftBank Hawks won the series, 2–1.

Game	Date	Score	Location	Time	Attendance
1	October 7	Fukuoka SoftBank Hawks – 0, Seibu Lions – 1	Invoice Seibu Dome	2:51	29,187
2	October 8	Fukuoka SoftBank Hawks – 11, Seibu Lions – 3	Invoice Seibu Dome	3:38	31,338
3	October 9	Fukuoka SoftBank Hawks – 6, Seibu Lions – 1	Invoice Seibu Dome	3:34	27,344

=== Game 1 ===
Saturday, October 7, 2006, 1:01 pm (JST) at Invoice Seibu Dome in Tokorozawa, Saitama Prefecture
Team	1	2	3	4	5	6	7	8	9	R	H	E
SoftBank	0	0	0	0	0	0	0	0	0	0	6	0
Seibu	0	0	0	0	0	0	1	0	X	1	4	0
WP: Daisuke Matsuzaka (1–0) LP: Kazumi Saito (0–1); Attendance: 29,187

=== Game 2 ===
Sunday, October 8, 2006, 1:00 pm (JST) at Invoice Seibu Dome in Tokorozawa, Saitama Prefecture
Team	1	2	3	4	5	6	7	8	9	R	H	E
SoftBank	0	0	0	4	0	1	0	1	5	11	12	0
Seibu	1	0	0	0	2	0	0	0	0	3	6	0
WP: Akihiro Yanase (1–0) LP: Hironori Matsunaga (0–1); Home runs: SOF: Nobuhiko Matsunaka (1), Julio Zuleta (1); SEI: Hiroyuki Nakajima (1); Attendance: 31,338

=== Game 3 ===
Monday, October 9, 2006, 1:00 pm (JST) at Invoice Seibu Dome in Tokorozawa, Saitama Prefecture
Team	1	2	3	4	5	6	7	8	9	R	H	E
SoftBank	0	0	0	0	0	0	1	4	1	6	11	0
Seibu	0	0	0	0	1	0	0	0	0	1	5	0
WP: Akihiro Yanase (2–0) LP: Tomoki Hoshino (0–1); Home runs: SOF: Julio Zuleta (2); SEI: Takeya Nakamura (1); Attendance: 27,344

== Second stage ==
=== Summary ===
Hokkaido Nippon-Ham Fighters won the series, 3–0.

Game	Date	Score	Location	Time	Attendance
1	October 11	Fukuoka SoftBank Hawks – 1, Hokkaido Nippon-Ham Fighters – 3	Sapporo Dome	3:27	42,380
2	October 12	Fukuoka SoftBank Hawks – 0, Hokkaido Nippon-Ham Fighters – 1	Sapporo Dome	2:53	42,380

=== Game 1 ===
Wednesday, October 11, 2006, 6:00 pm (JST) at Sapporo Dome in Sapporo, Hokkaido
Team	1	2	3	4	5	6	7	8	9	R	H	E
SoftBank	1	0	0	0	0	0	0	0	0	1	7	0
Nippon-Ham	0	0	2	0	0	0	0	1	X	3	8	0
WP: Yu Darvish (1–0) LP: Toshiya Sugiuchi (0–1); Attendance: 42,380

=== Game 2 ===
Wednesday, October 11, 2006, 6:01 pm (JST) at Sapporo Dome in Sapporo, Hokkaido
Team	1	2	3	4	5	6	7	8	9	R	H	E
SoftBank	0	0	0	0	0	0	0	0	0	0	3	0
Nippon-Ham	0	0	0	0	0	0	0	0	1X	1	5	1
WP: Tomoya Yagi (1–0) LP: Kazumi Saito (0–1); Attendance: 42,380
