= 2021 Pacific League Climax Series =

Japanese baseball series

First stage
| Team (Wins) | | Manager | Season |
| Chiba Lotte Marines (1) | | Tadahito Iguchi | 67–57–19 (.540), 2½ GB |
| Tohoku Rakuten Golden Eagles (0) | | Kazuhisa Ishii | 66–62–15 (.516), 5½ GB |
- Dates: November 6–7

Final stage
| Team (Wins) | | Manager | Season |
| Orix Buffaloes (3) | | Satoshi Nakajima | 70–55–18 (.560), 2½ GA |
| Chiba Lotte Marines (0) | | Tadahito Iguchi | 67–57–19 (.540), 2½ GB |
- Dates: November 10–12
- MVP: Yutaro Sugimoto (Orix)

The 2021 Pacific League Climax Series (PLCS) was a set of two consecutive playoff series in Nippon Professional Baseball (NPB). The First Stage began on November 6 and the Final Stage concluded on November 12. The First Stage was a best-of-three series between the second-place Chiba Lotte Marines and the third-place Tohoku Rakuten Golden Eagles. The Final Series was a best-of-six with the Orix Buffaloes, the Pacific League champion, being awarded a one-win advantage against the Marines, the winner of the First Stage. The Buffaloes advanced to the 2021 Japan Series to compete against the Tokyo Yakult Swallows, the 2021 Central League Climax Series winner.

== Background ==
In 2020, the COVID-19 pandemic delayed the start of the Nippon Professional Baseball (NPB) season causing the Pacific League (PL) to cut their Climax Series' First Stage entirely and shorten their Final Stage. The traditional Climax Series format returned in 2021, however, as with games during the regular season, no extra innings were played due to pandemic restrictions, resulting in games being called draws after nine innings instead of the usual twelve. As always, if a series ended in a tie, the higher-seed team advanced. Additionally, game attendance was also limited for safety reasons. Contests held at Zozo Marine Stadium were limited to approximately 15,000 spectators, while games at Kyocera Dome were limited to approximately 18,000. For the fourth year in a row, Persol Holdings sponsored the naming rights for the Pacific League Climax Series, and it was officially known as the "2021 Persol Climax Series PA".

The Chiba Lotte Marines made a push for the PL title late in the season, having a chance to win it with three games remaining on their schedule. A loss to the Tohoku Rakuten Golden Eagles, however, ensured that the Marines finished in second place for the second year in a row and would host the Eagles in the First Stage. During the regular season, intra-league teams play 25 games against each other. Despite winning the last game played to knock the Marines out of pennant contention, the Eagles lost the season series with a 9–15–1 record and finished the season 3 games behind Lotte. Previously, the two teams met in the Climax Series only once during the 2013 Final Stage where Rakuten defeated Lotte and went on to win their only Japan Series title.

The Orix Buffaloes clinched the Pacific League pennant on October 27, their first league title since 1996 and 13th overall. The team finished the previous two seasons in last place and, prior to this year, the 2014 season was the last in which they finished with a winning record. Orix started the season slow, but went on to finish first in interleague play in June. They also won 11 straight winning decisions, their longest streak in 37 years, and spent the majority of the summer in first place. The championship advanced the Buffaloes directly to the Final Stage of the Climax Series to host the Marines, the eventual winner of the First Stage. The two teams split the season series 10–10–5, with Orix and finishing 2.5 games ahead of Lotte. The series was the first time the two teams played each other in the Climax Series.

== First stage ==
=== Summary ===
Lotte won the series, 1–0–1.

| Game | Date | Score | Location | Time | Attendance |
|---|---|---|---|---|---|
| 1 | November 6 | Tohoku Rakuten Golden Eagles – 4, Chiba Lotte Marines – 5 | Zozo Marine Stadium | 3:10 | 14,904 |
| 2 | November 7 | Tohoku Rakuten Golden Eagles – 4, Chiba Lotte Marines – 4 | Zozo Marine Stadium | 3:07 | 14,891 |

=== Game 1 ===
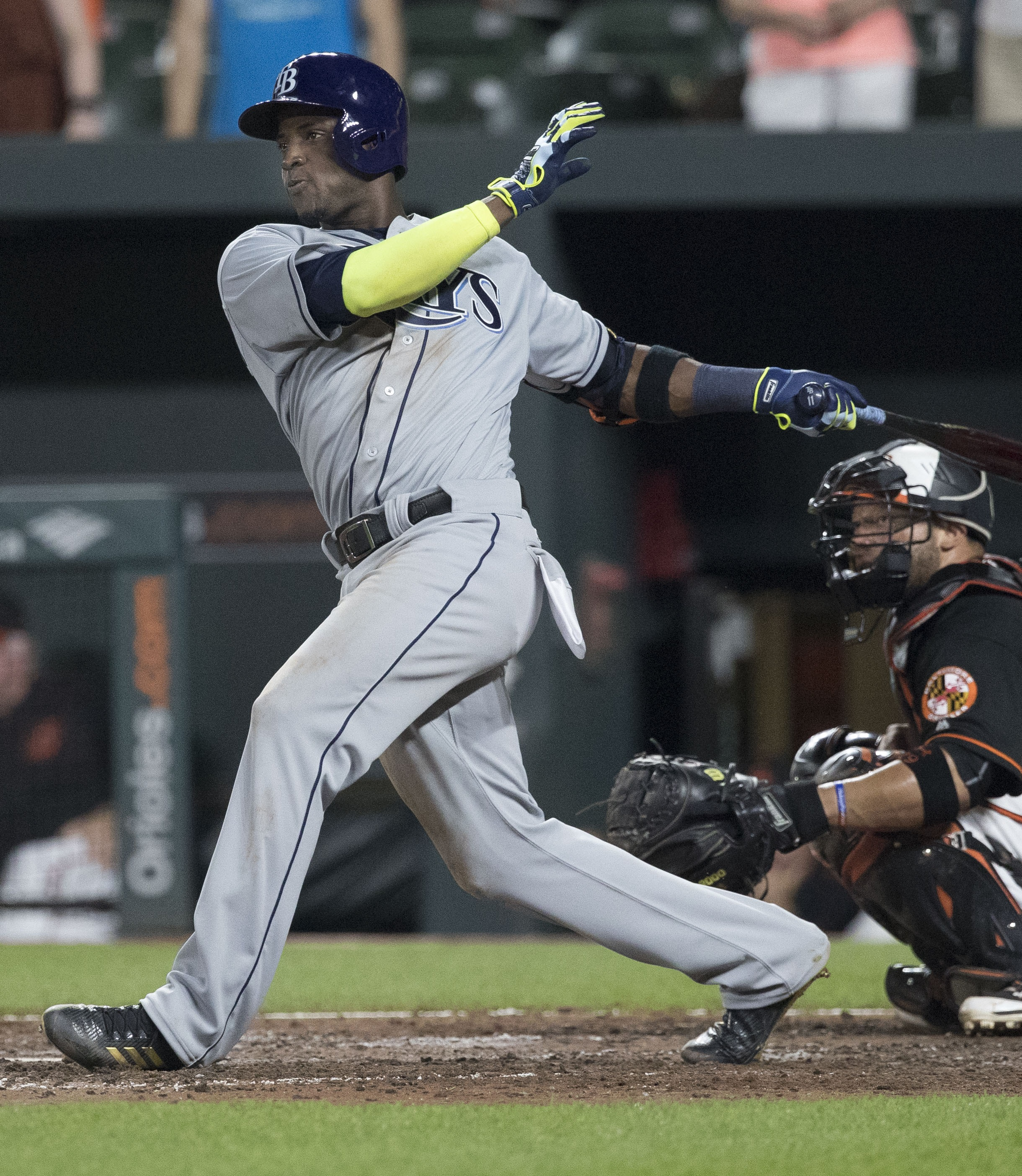
Adeiny Hechavarria hit a game-tying home run in Game 1

Saturday, November 6, 2021, 2:00 pm (JST) at Zozo Marine Stadium in Chiba, Chiba Prefecture
| Team | 1 | 2 | 3 | 4 | 5 | 6 | 7 | 8 | 9 | R | H | E |
|---|---|---|---|---|---|---|---|---|---|---|---|---|
| Rakuten | 0 | 1 | 0 | 0 | 0 | 0 | 3 | 0 | 0 | 4 | 5 | 0 |
| Lotte | 0 | 0 | 3 | 0 | 0 | 0 | 0 | 1 | 1X | 5 | 9 | 2 |
WP: Naoya Masuda (1–0) LP: Sung Chia-hao (0–1); Home runs: RAK: None; LOT: Adeiny Hechavarria (1); Attendance: 14,904; Boxscore

Rōki Sasaki was the starting pitcher for the Chiba Lotte Marines in Game 1 of the First Stage. At age 20, Sasaki became the second-youngest player to start a Climax Series game in his postseason debut. He held the Tohoku Rakuten Golden Eagles to one unearned run during his six innings, allowing only four hits and walking two. The unearned run, however, resulted from a throwing error Sasaki made in the second inning, allowing Hiroaki Shimauchi to score from second base. Takahiro Norimoto's start for the Eagles only lasted four innings. Lotte loaded the bases in the third, after Takashi Ogino singled, Leonys Martín drew a walk, and Shogo Nakamura reached first on a ball hit to Norimoto. The Marines took the lead on a 2-run single by Brandon Laird, with Hisanori Yasuda's sacrifice fly making the score 3–1.

The Eagles were held scoreless until the seventh inning when the Marines brought in relief pitcher Yuki Kuniyoshi. To start the inning, Ryosuke Tatsumi drew a walk and Hikaru Ohta reached base on a throwing error by Kuniyoshi. Tsuyoshi Yamasaki attempted a bunt to advance the runners, but the attempt was caught by Kuniyoshi who was also able to complete a double play by running to second base. Rakuten went on to draw two more walks to load the bases, and then scored three more runs when Shimauchi doubled off new reliever Yuki Karakawa, putting the Eagles ahead, 4–3. Adeiny Hechavarria tied the game with a solo home run the next inning. Then, in the ninth, Hiromi Oka was hit by a pitch, advanced to second on a bunt, and scored on a Toshiya Satoh walk-off hit, giving Lotte a 1–0 lead in the series.

=== Game 2 ===
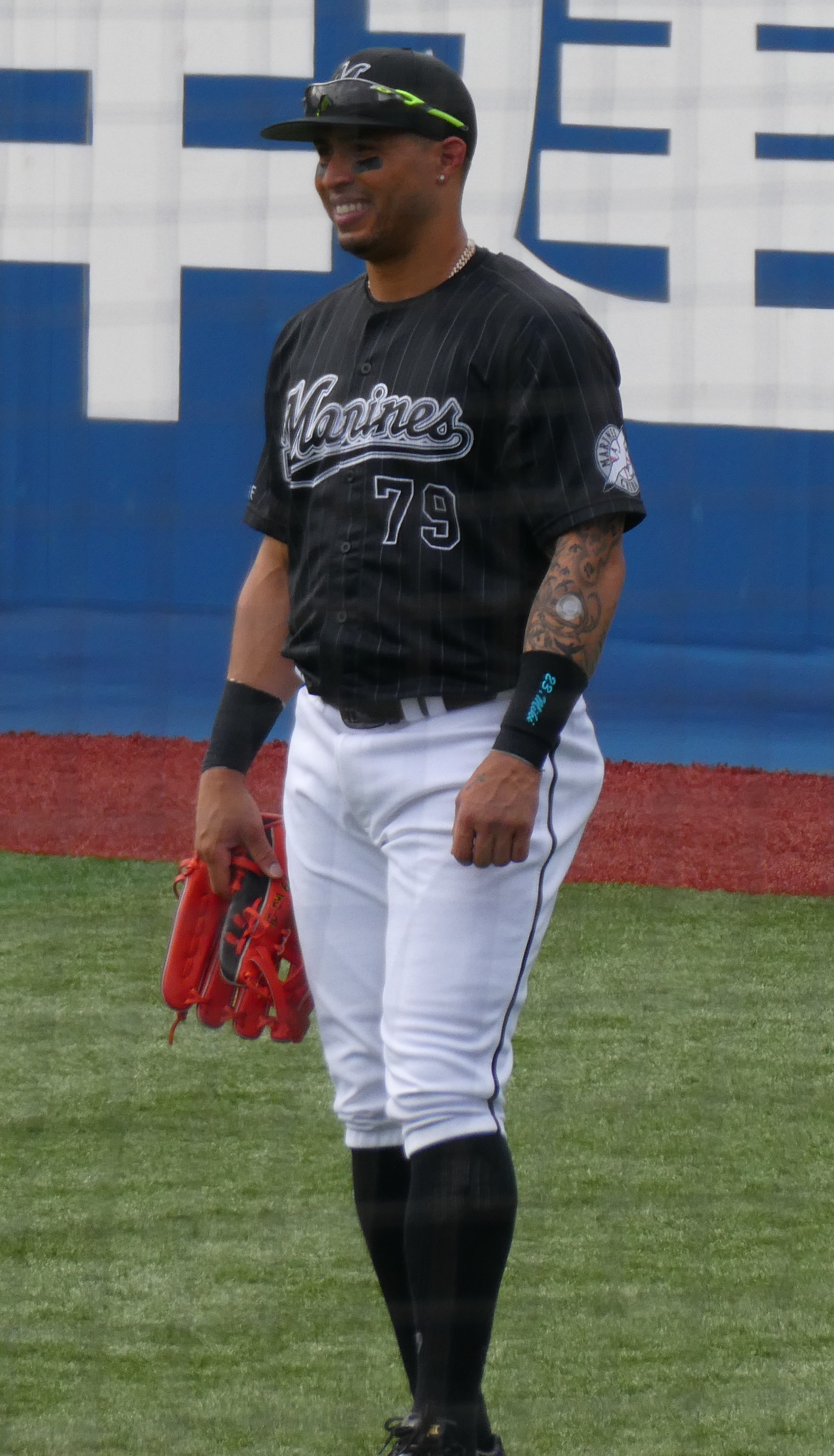
Leonys Martín hit a game-tying home run in Game 2.

Sunday, November 7, 2021, 2:00 pm (JST) at Zozo Marine Stadium in Chiba, Chiba Prefecture
| Team | 1 | 2 | 3 | 4 | 5 | 6 | 7 | 8 | 9 | R | H | E |
|---|---|---|---|---|---|---|---|---|---|---|---|---|
| Rakuten | 0 | 2 | 0 | 0 | 0 | 0 | 2 | 0 | 0 | 4 | 11 | 0 |
| Lotte | 0 | 1 | 0 | 1 | 0 | 1 | 1 | 0 | X | 4 | 9 | 0 |
Home runs: RAK: Ginjiro Sumitani (1); LOT: Koki Yamaguchi (1), Leonys Martín (1); Attendance: 14,891; Notes: Extra innings were not played in Climax Series games in 2021 because of pandemic restrictions. If a Climax Series ends in a tie, the higher seed advances, therefore Lotte advanced following this draw as it ensured that Rakuten could do no better than tie the series. Boxscore

Starting pitchers were Takayuki Kishi for Rakuten and Kazuya Ojima for Lotte. For the second time in the series, the Eagles scored first. In the second inning, Daichi Suzuki doubled and reached home on a single by Ginjiro Sumitani. Suzuki was originally called out at home plate, but the call was reversed and the run scored after a video review. Yamasaki collected a run batted in (RBI) later that inning with a single, bringing the score to 2–0. The Marines responded with two singles to start the bottom of the second inning, with Hechavarria scoring Oka while hitting into a double play to cut the Eagles lead to one. Later, in the fourth inning, Hechavarria drew a one-out walk and scored on a double by Koki Yamaguchi, tying the game, 2–2. A home run by Yamaguchi in the sixth inning off of Eagles' reliever Tomohiro Anraku gave Lotte their first lead of the game. However, the next inning, the Eagles evened the score again with a lead off, solo home run by Sumitani and then reclaimed the lead when Yamasaki doubled, advanced to third on a ground out, and scored on a single by Shimauchi. Lotte responded in the bottom of the inning with a two-out, solo home run by Martín to tie the game. Marines' relievers Chihaya Sasaki and Naoya Masuda kept Rakuten scoreless in the eighth and ninth innings, respectively, securing the 4–4 tie. By tying Game 2 after winning the first game, Lotte ensured that the Eagles could do no better than tie the three-game series. A tied series results in the higher-seeded team advancing, therefore a Game 3 was not necessary since Lotte would advance no matter the outcome.

== Final stage ==
=== Summary ===
Orix won the series, 3–0–1*.

| Game | Date | Score | Location | Time | Attendance |
|---|---|---|---|---|---|
| 1 | November 10 | Chiba Lotte Marines – 0, Orix Buffaloes – 1 | Kyocera Dome | 2:23 | 17,915 |
| 2 | November 11 | Chiba Lotte Marines – 0, Orix Buffaloes – 2 | Kyocera Dome | 2:42 | 17,913 |
| 3 | November 12 | Chiba Lotte Marines – 3, Orix Buffaloes – 3 | Kyocera Dome | 3:33 | 18,006 |

* The Pacific League regular season champion is given a one-game advantage in the final stage.

=== Game 1 ===
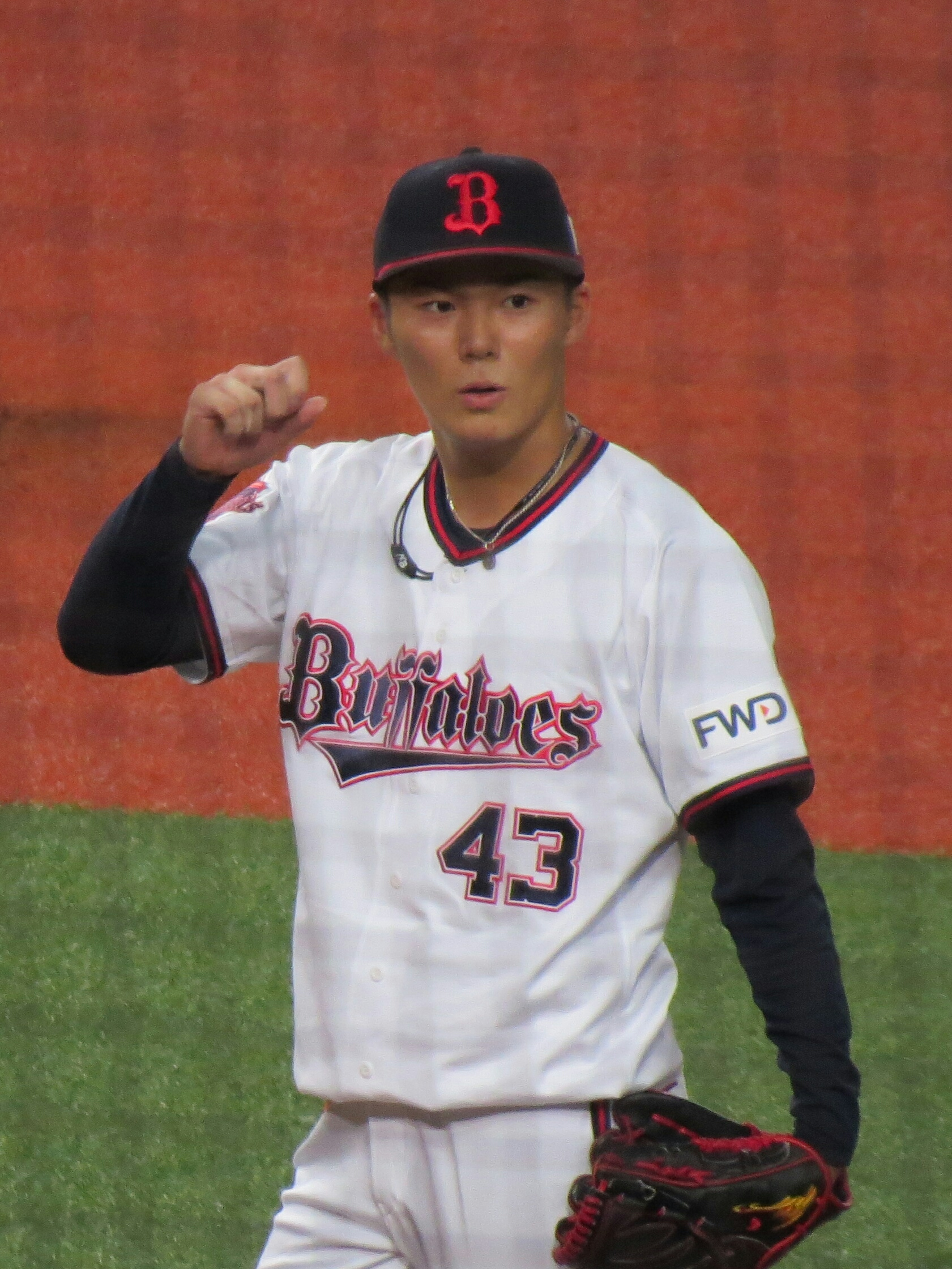
Yoshinobu Yamamoto pitched a complete game shutout for the Buffaloes in Game 1.

Wednesday, November 10, 2021, 6:01 pm (JST) at Kyocera Dome in Osaka, Osaka Prefecture
| Team | 1 | 2 | 3 | 4 | 5 | 6 | 7 | 8 | 9 | R | H | E |
|---|---|---|---|---|---|---|---|---|---|---|---|---|
| Lotte | 0 | 0 | 0 | 0 | 0 | 0 | 0 | 0 | 0 | 0 | 4 | 0 |
| Orix | 1 | 0 | 0 | 0 | 0 | 0 | 0 | 0 | X | 1 | 5 | 1 |
WP: Yoshinobu Yamamoto (1–0) LP: Ayumu Ishikawa (0–1); Attendance: 17,915; Boxscore

In the bottom of the first inning in Game 1, Marines starter Ayumu Ishikawa walked two batters, allowing Yuma Mune to score from second base on a single by Takahiro Okada. The run would prove to be the only one of the game, as Buffaloes starter Yoshinobu Yamamoto threw a complete game shutout in his Climax Series debut. Lotte was unable to put a runner on base after the fifth inning. In the outing, Yamamoto struck out ten batters and allowed only four hits and no walks on 126-pitches. Adeiny Hechavarria helped to keep Lotte scoreless by completing two impressive defensive plays in the game. The win, along with their one-win advantage, gave the Buffaloes a 2–0 series lead.

=== Game 2 ===
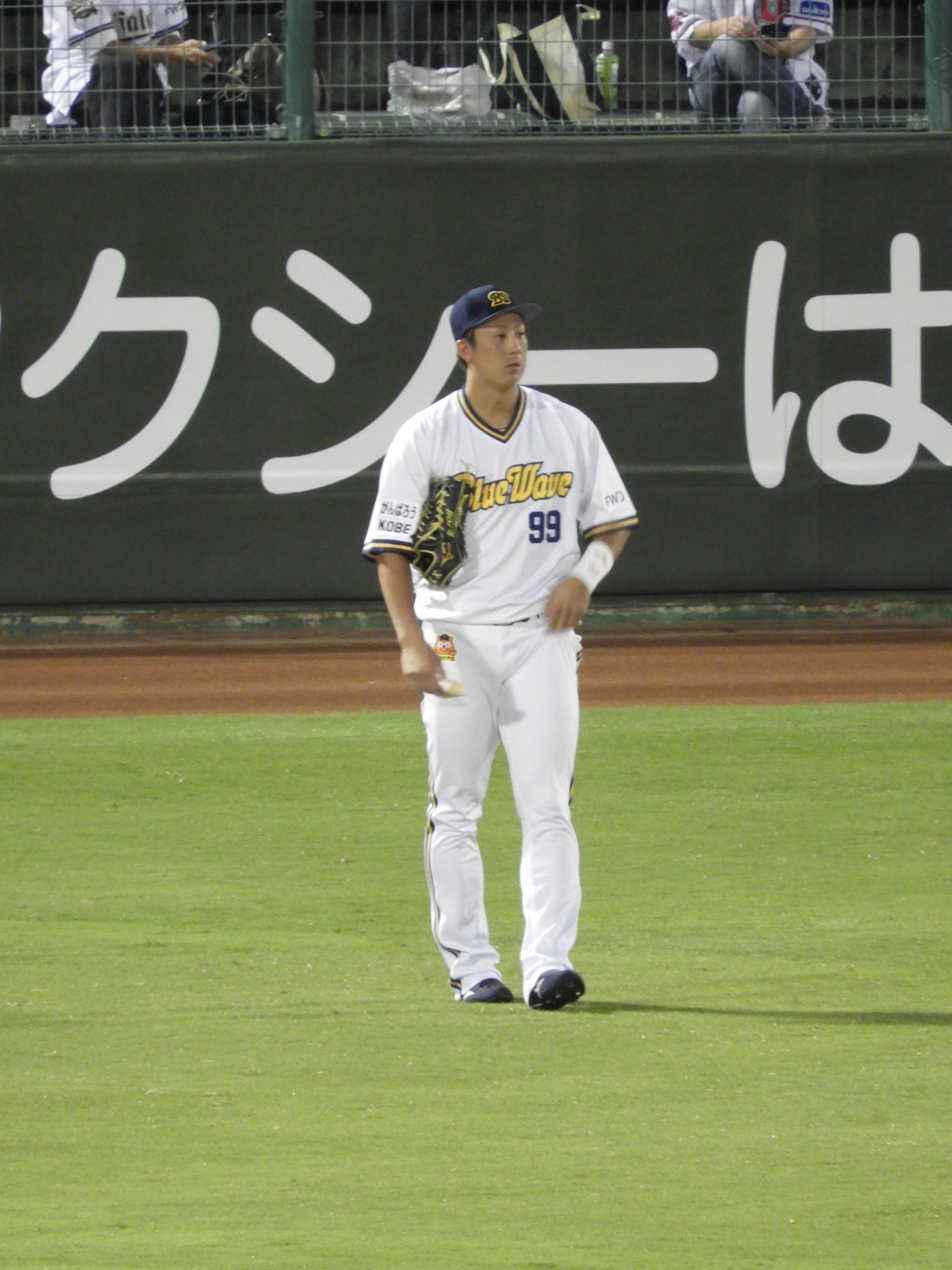
Yutaro Sugimoto's hit a two-run home run in Game 2

Thursday, November 11, 2021, 6:01 pm (JST) at Kyocera Dome in Osaka, Osaka Prefecture
| Team | 1 | 2 | 3 | 4 | 5 | 6 | 7 | 8 | 9 | R | H | E |
|---|---|---|---|---|---|---|---|---|---|---|---|---|
| Lotte | 0 | 0 | 0 | 0 | 0 | 0 | 0 | 0 | 0 | 0 | 4 | 0 |
| Orix | 0 | 0 | 0 | 0 | 0 | 2 | 0 | 0 | X | 2 | 6 | 0 |
WP: Daiki Tajima (1–0) LP: Manabu Mima (0–1) Sv: Yoshihisa Hirano (1); Home runs: LOT: None; ORX: Yutaro Sugimoto (1); Attendance: 17,913; Boxscore

Starting pitchers were Manabu Mima for Lotte and Daiki Tajima for Orix. Tajima struck out five batters and allowed three hits and a walk through six innings. In the bottom of the sixth, Mima left the game after a single by Masataka Yoshida struck his leg and Marines relief pitcher Yusuke Azuma was brought in to replace him. On Azuma's first pitch, Yutaro Sugimoto hit a two-run home run to give the Buffaloes the lead. The home run would be the only scoring of the game, as the two team's relief pitchers kept the remainder of the game scoreless. Orix's Yoshihisa Hirano closed out the game to earn the save to bring them within one win of a Japan Series berth.

=== Game 3 ===
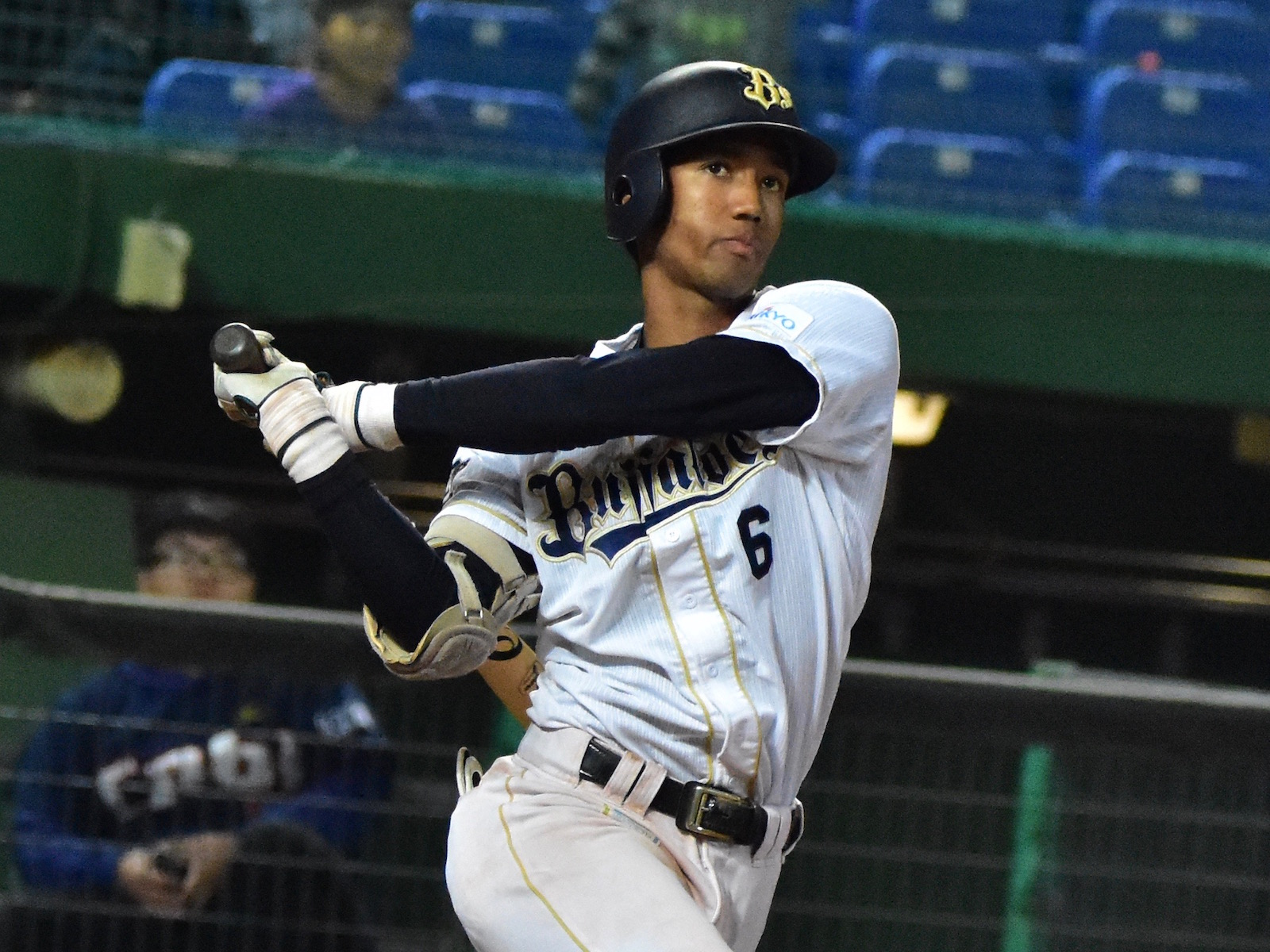
Yuma Mune hit a two-run home run in Game 3.

Friday, November 12, 2021, 6:02 pm (JST) at Kyocera Dome in Osaka, Osaka Prefecture
| Team | 1 | 2 | 3 | 4 | 5 | 6 | 7 | 8 | 9 | R | H | E |
|---|---|---|---|---|---|---|---|---|---|---|---|---|
| Lotte | 0 | 0 | 1 | 0 | 0 | 0 | 1 | 1 | 0 | 3 | 8 | 0 |
| Orix | 0 | 0 | 0 | 0 | 0 | 2 | 0 | 0 | 1X | 3 | 8 | 0 |
Home runs: LOT: Shogo Nakamura (1); ORX: Yuma Mune (1); Attendance: 18,006; Notes: Extra innings were not played in Climax Series games in 2021 because of pandemic restrictions. Game and series ended when tying run was scored since NPB rules state if a Climax Series round ends in a tie, the higher seed advanced as Lotte could do no better than tie the series. Boxscore

Soichiro Yamazaki started for the Buffaloes, while Daiki Iwashita started for the Marines. In the top of the third inning, a one-out single then double by Takashi Ogino and Koshiro Wada, respectively, set up Shogo Nakamura to hit a sacrifice fly to give Lotte their first run and lead of the series. Yamazaki was removed from the game that same inning after walking the following batter. After five scoreless innings, Iwashita gave up a two-run home run to Mune, giving the Buffaloes the lead, 2–1. Lotte's Leonys Martín singled, advanced to second on a flyout, and then tied the game on a single by Toshiya Sato in the seventh. The next inning, Nakamura gave the Marines the lead again with a solo home run. Needing a win to continue the series, Lotte went to the PL saves leader, Naoya Masuda, in relief in the ninth inning. The Buffaloes scored a run on three straight no-out singles by Okada, Ryoichi Adachi and Yuya Oda, to tie the game. With Orix advancing on a draw and no extra innings being played, the game ended after Oda's game-tying single, which was the series-winning RBI to advance the Buffaloes to the Japan Series. It was the first walk-off tie in Climax Series history.
