= 2007 Pacific League Climax Series =

Japanese baseball series

First stage
Team (Wins)		Manager	Season
Chiba Lotte Marines (2)		Bobby Valentine	76–61–7 (.555), 2 GB
Fukuoka SoftBank Hawks (1)		Sadaharu Oh	73–66–5 (.525), 6 GB
- Dates: October 8–10

Second stage
Team (Wins)		Manager	Season
Hokkaido Nippon-Ham Fighters (3)		Trey Hillman	79–60–5 (.568), 2 GA
Chiba Lotte Marines (2)		Bobby Valentine	76–61–7 (.555), 2 GB
- Dates: October 13–18
- MVP: First Stage: Saburo Omura (Lotte); Second Stage: Yu Darvish (Nippon-Ham)

The 2007 Pacific League Climax Series (PLCS) was a set of consecutive playoff series for the Pacific League of Nippon Professional Baseball (NPB) in the 2007 season. In the First Stage, two teams competed in a best-of-three series while Second Stage was a best-of-five. The winner of the Second Stage advanced to the 2007 Japan Series, where they competed against the 2007 Central League Climax Series winner. The top three regular-season finishers played in the two series. The PLCS began with the first game of Stage 1 on October 8 and ended with the final game of Stage 2 on October 18. This was the last playoff prior to the adoption of a one-win advantage for the regular season champion, which came into play for 2008 that has remained ever since.

== First stage ==
=== Summary ===
Chiba Lotte Marines won the series, 2–1.

Game	Date	Score	Location	Time	Attendance
1	October 8	Fukuoka SoftBank Hawks – 4, Chiba Lotte Marines – 8	Chiba Marine Stadium	3:30	30,010
2	October 9	Fukuoka SoftBank Hawks – 8, Chiba Lotte Marines – 3	Chiba Marine Stadium	3:13	29,411
3	October 10	Fukuoka SoftBank Hawks – 0, Chiba Lotte Marines – 4	Chiba Marine Stadium	3:07	30,011

=== Game 1 ===
Monday, October 8, 2007 at Chiba Marine Stadium in Chiba, Chiba Prefecture
Team	1	2	3	4	5	6	7	8	9	R	H	E
SoftBank	0	0	3	1	0	0	0	0	0	4	5	0
Lotte	0	0	3	2	1	1	0	1	X	8	9	1
WP: Shunsuke Watanabe (1–0) LP: Kazumi Saito (0–1); Home runs: SOF: None; LOT: José Ortiz (1)

=== Game 2 ===
Tuesday, October 9, 2007 at Chiba Marine Stadium in Chiba, Chiba Prefecture
Team	1	2	3	4	5	6	7	8	9	R	H	E
SoftBank	2	4	0	1	1	0	0	0	0	8	15	0
Lotte	0	0	1	0	0	0	2	0	0	3	7	0
WP: Toshiya Sugiuchi (1–0) LP: Hiroyuki Kobayashi (0–1); Home runs: SOF: Nobuhiko Matsunaka (1), Brian Buchanan (1); LOT: Kazuya Fukuura (1)

=== Game 3 ===
Wednesday, October 10, 2007 at Chiba Marine Stadium in Chiba, Chiba Prefecture
Team	1	2	3	4	5	6	7	8	9	R	H	E
SoftBank	0	0	0	0	0	0	0	0	0	0	5	0
Lotte	0	0	0	0	0	4	0	0	X	4	6	0
WP: Yoshihisa Naruse (1–0) LP: Jason Standridge (0–1)

== Second stage ==
=== Summary ===
Hokkaido Nippon-Ham Fighters won the series, 3–2.

Game	Date	Score	Location	Time	Attendance
1	October 13	Chiba Lotte Marines – 2, Hokkaido Nippon-Ham Fighters – 5	Sapporo Dome	3:06	42,222
2	October 14	Chiba Lotte Marines – 8, Hokkaido Nippon-Ham Fighters – 1	Sapporo Dome	3:40	42,222
3	October 15	Chiba Lotte Marines – 0, Hokkaido Nippon-Ham Fighters – 7	Sapporo Dome	3:12	42,222
4	October 16	Chiba Lotte Marines – 5, Hokkaido Nippon-Ham Fighters – 1	Sapporo Dome	3:59	42,222
5	October 18	Chiba Lotte Marines – 2, Hokkaido Nippon-Ham Fighters – 6	Sapporo Dome	3:09	42,222

=== Game 1 ===
Saturday, October 13, 2007 at Sapporo Dome in Sapporo, Hokkaido
Team	1	2	3	4	5	6	7	8	9	R	H	E
Lotte	0	1	1	0	0	0	0	0	0	2	5	0
Nippon-Ham	0	4	0	0	1	0	0	0	X	5	13	0
WP: Yu Darvish (1–0) LP: Yasutomo Kubo (0–1)

=== Game 2 ===
Sunday, October 14, 2007 at Sapporo Dome in Sapporo, Hokkaido
Team	1	2	3	4	5	6	7	8	9	R	H	E
Lotte	0	4	0	0	1	0	0	1	2	8	13	1
Nippon-Ham	1	0	0	0	0	0	0	0	0	1	4	0
WP: Koji Takagi (1–0) LP: Masaru Takeda (0–1); Home runs: LOT: Tomoya Satozaki (2), José Ortiz (1), Saburo Omura (1), Daisuke Hayakawa (1); NIP: None

=== Game 3 ===
Monday, October 15, 2007 at Sapporo Dome in Sapporo, Hokkaido
Team	1	2	3	4	5	6	7	8	9	R	H	E
Lotte	0	0	0	0	0	0	0	0	0	0	6	0
Nippon-Ham	0	0	0	1	0	0	6	0	X	7	13	0
WP: Ryan Glynn (1–0) LP: Shunsuke Watanabe (0–1)

=== Game 4 ===
Tuesday, October 16, 2007 at Sapporo Dome in Sapporo, Hokkaido
Team	1	2	3	4	5	6	7	8	9	R	H	E
Lotte	0	0	0	0	0	2	0	0	3	5	14	0
Nippon-Ham	0	0	0	0	1	0	0	0	0	1	11	0
WP: Yusuke Kawasaki (1–0) LP: Masaru Takeda (0–2); Home runs: LOT: Tomoya Satozaki (3); NIP: None

=== Game 5 ===
Thursday, October 18, 2007 at Sapporo Dome in Sapporo, Hokkaido
Team	1	2	3	4	5	6	7	8	9	R	H	E
Lotte	0	0	0	0	0	1	0	0	1	2	8	0
Nippon-Ham	0	0	3	1	2	0	0	0	X	6	11	0
WP: Yu Darvish (2–0) LP: Yoshihisa Naruse (0–1); Home runs: LOT: None; NIP: Fernando Seguignol (1)
