= Daisuke Hayakawa =

Japanese baseball player (born 1975)

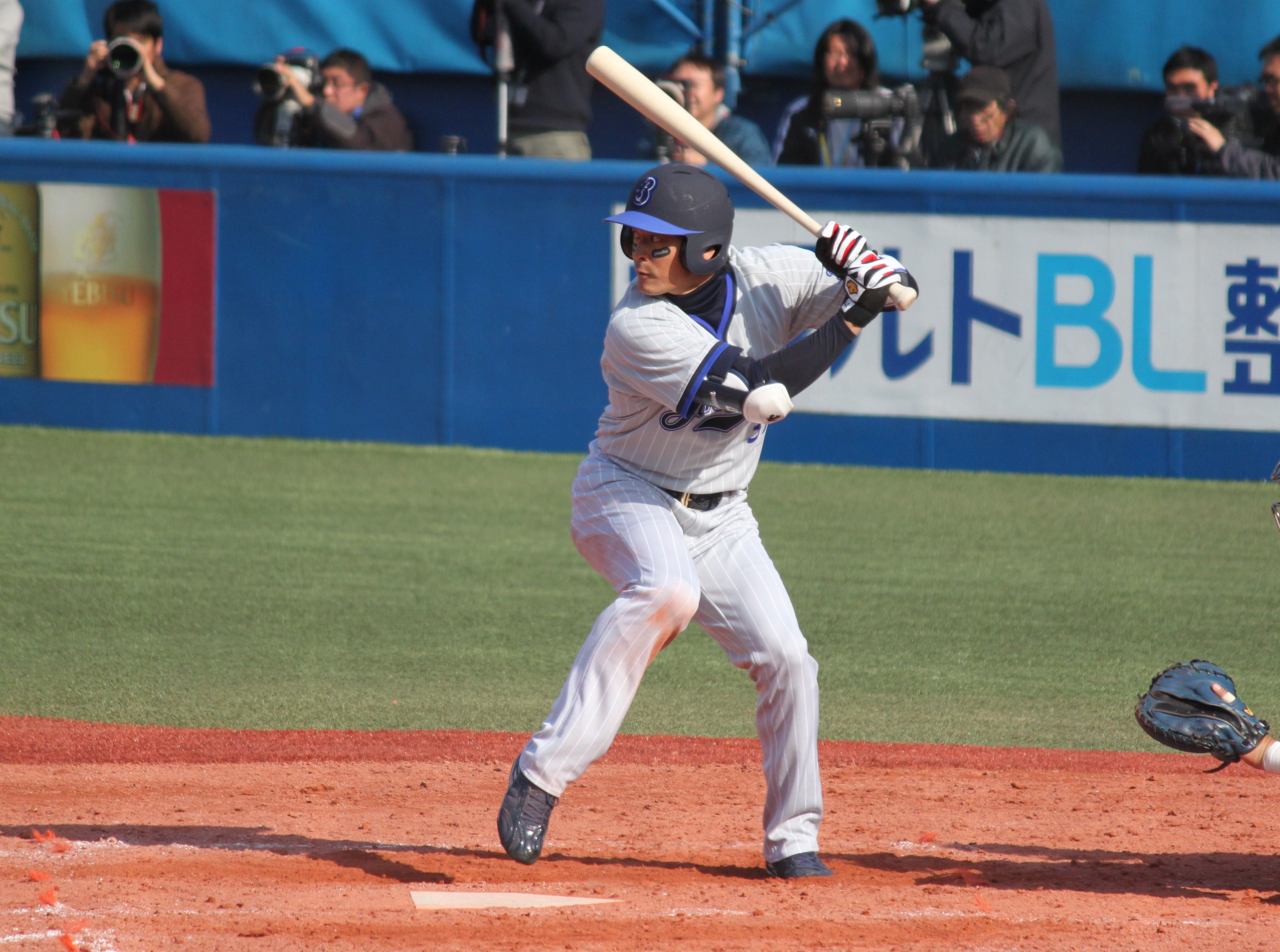
- Outfielder / Coach
- Born: June 3, 1975 (age 50); Urayasu, Chiba, Japan
- Bats: Switch Throws: Right

NPB debut
- April 4, 2002, for the Orix BlueWave

NPB statistics (through 2008 season)
- Batting average: .267
- Hits: 371
- RBIs: 120
- Stats at Baseball Reference

Teams
- As player: Orix BlueWave/Orix Buffaloes (2002 – 2006); Chiba Lotte Marines (2007 – 2009); Yokohama BayStars (2010 – 2011); As coach: Orix Buffaloes (2016 – 2019)
- Last updated on: 11 December 2008

Daisuke Hayakawa (早川 大輔, Hayakawa Daisuke; born June 3, 1975) is a Japanese professional baseball player. He was the number 5 draft pick for the Orix BlueWave in 2002.
