= Akihiro Yanase =

Japanese baseball player

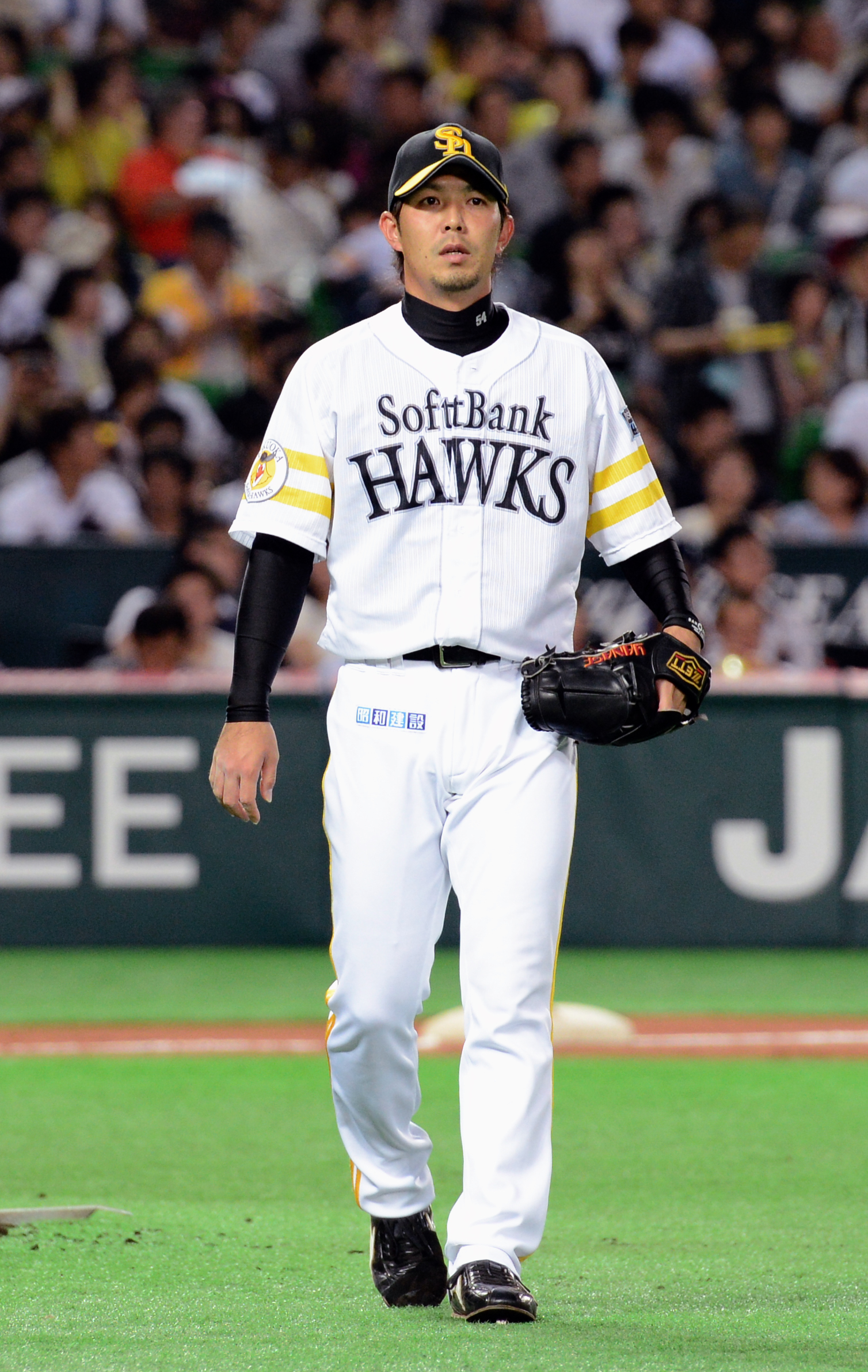
- Yanase with the Fukuoka SoftBank Hawks
- pitcher
- Born: July 8, 1983 (age 42); Hatsukaichi, Hiroshima, Japan
- Batted: Right Threw: Right

NPB debut
- August 27, 2006, for the Fukuoka SoftBank Hawks

Last NPB appearance
- June 23, 2017, for the Hanshin Tigers

NPB statistics (through 2017 season)
- Win–loss record: 11–6
- ERA: 3.32
- Strikeouts: 195
- Saves: 8
- Holds: 52
- Stats at Baseball Reference

Teams
- Fukuoka SoftBank Hawks (2006–2016); Hanshin Tigers (2017)

Akihiro Yanase (柳瀬 明宏, Yanase Akihiro; born July 8, 1983) is a professional Japanese baseball player. He plays pitcher for the Hanshin Tigers.
