= Saburo Omura =

Japanese baseball player (born 1976)

Saburo (Saburo Ohmura)
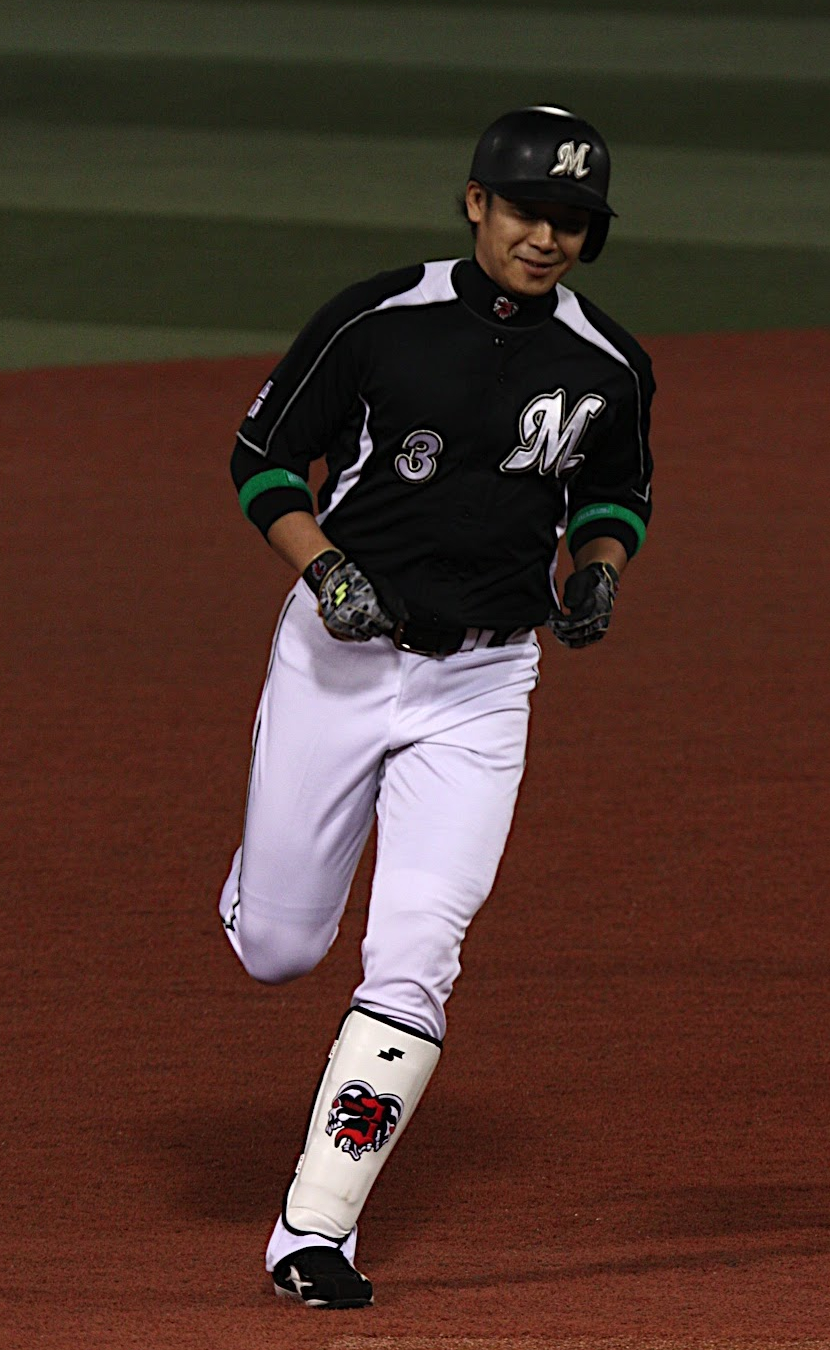
- Saburo with the Chiba Lotte Marines

Chiba Lotte Marines – No. 86
- Outfielder / Coach / Manager
- Born: June 1, 1976 (age 50); Okayama, Japan
- Batted: Right Threw: Right

NPB debut
- June 25, 1995, for the Chiba Lotte Marines

Last NPB appearance
- September 25, 2016, for the Chiba Lotte Marines

NPB statistics
- Batting average: .265
- Hits: 1,363
- Home runs: 127
- Runs batted in: 655
- Stats at Baseball Reference

Teams
- As player: Chiba Lotte Marines (1995–2011); Yomiuri Giants (2011); Chiba Lotte Marines (2012–2016); As coach: Chiba Lotte Marines (2023–2025); As manager: Chiba Lotte Marines (2026–present)

Career highlights and awards
- 2007 PLCS First Stage MVP; 2× Japan Series champions (2005, 2010)

Saburo Ohmura (大村 三郎, Ohmura Saburo; born June 1, 1976) also known as Saburo (サブロー) is a Japanese former professional baseball outfielder who currently serves as the manager for the Chiba Lotte Marines of Nippon Professional Baseball (NPB). He played in NPB for the Marines and the Yomiuri Giants from 1995 to 2016.
