= Tyrone Woods =

American baseball player (born 1969)

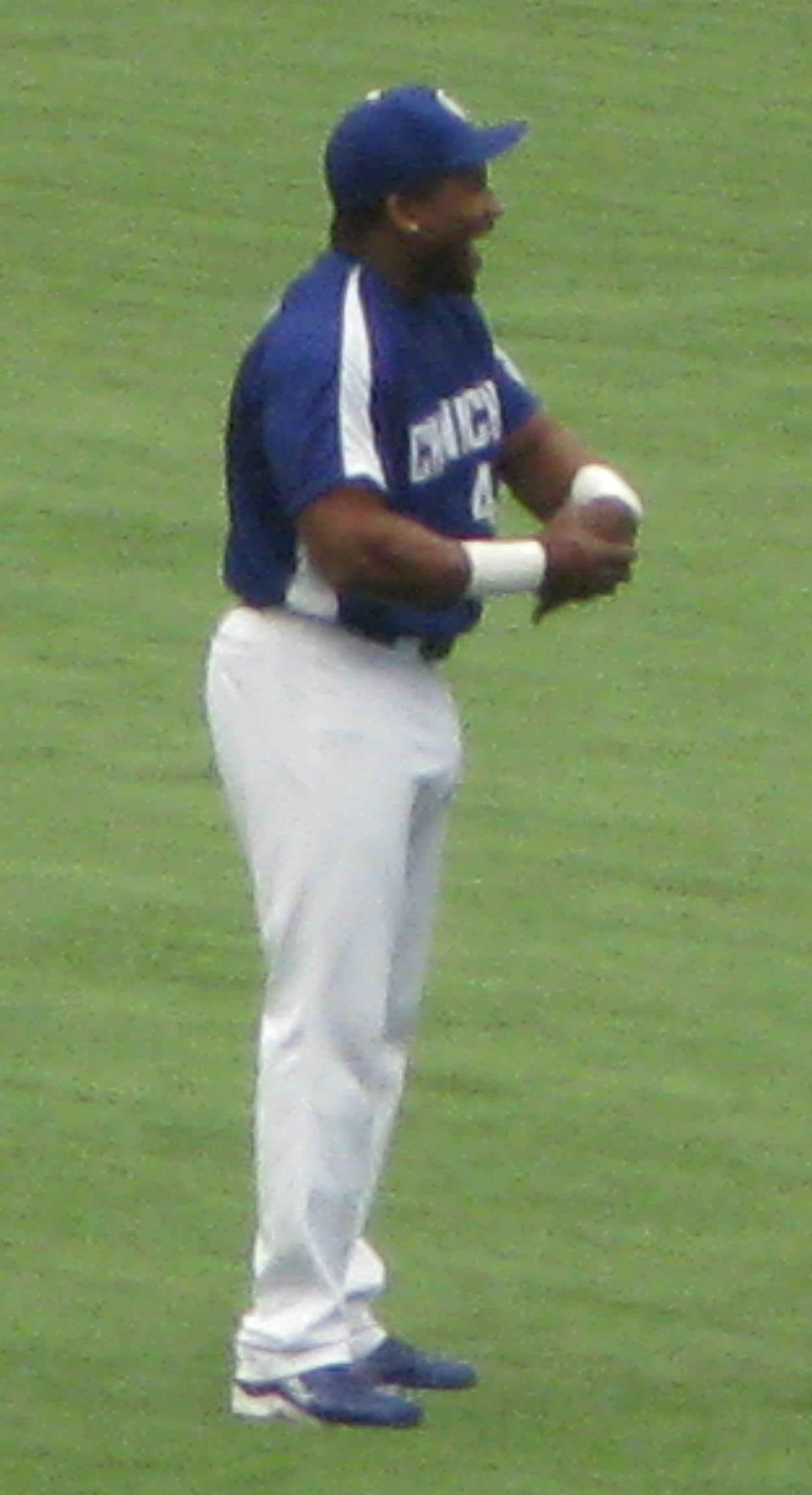
- Woods with the Chunichi Dragons
- First baseman
- Born: August 16, 1969 (age 57); Brooksville, Florida, U.S.
- Batted: Right Threw: Right

Professional debut
- NPB: March 23, 2003, for the Yokohama BayStars
- KBO: 1998, for the OB Bears

Last appearance
- NPB: October 25, 2008, for the Chunichi Dragons
- KBO: 2002, for the Doosan Bears

NPB statistics
- Batting average: .289
- Home runs: 240
- Runs batted in: 616

KBO statistics
- Batting average: .294
- Home runs: 174
- Runs batted in: 510
- Stats at Baseball Reference

Teams
- OB Bears / Doosan Bears (1998–2002); Yokohama BayStars (2003–2004); Chunichi Dragons (2005–2008)

Career highlights and awards
- NPB: 3× NPB All-Star (2003, 2007, 2008); 3× Best Nine Award (2004, 2006, 2007); CL home run leader (2003, 2004, 2006); CL RBI leader (2006); KBO: KBO MVP (1998); Korean Series champion (2001); Korean Series MVP (2001); KBO All Star Game MVP (2001); KBO Golden Glove Award (2000); KBO home run leader (1998); KBO RBI leader (1998, 2001)

Walter Tyrone Woods (born August 16, 1969) is an American professional baseball player. He played five seasons with the Korea Baseball Organization then six further seasons in Nippon Professional Baseball, primarily as a first baseman.

== Career ==
=== Minor league career ===
The Montreal Expos selected Woods in the fifth round of the 1988 MLB draft as a high school third baseman. He fielded .882, making 10 errors in 32 games for the GCL Expos and batted just .121. He hit just 2 home runs in 149 at bats and walked 7 times while whiffing 47 times; he was also caught stealing four times in six tries.

Woods was promoted to the Jamestown Expos in 1989. In Single-A action, Woods hit .263; he continued to strike out frequently (58 times in 209 AB), but his walks were up (20) and his average and power (9 homers) were also improved.

In 1990, with the Rockford Expos, the 20-year-old third baseman hit .242, above the team average of .226. He also led the team in doubles (27), homers (8) and strikeouts (121). His OBP was .310 and he slugged .363.

Woods made it to High-A in 1991 where he hit just .220 for the West Palm Beach Expos. He also was moved from third base to the outfield that year. He hit .291 for Rockford and even stole 15 bases in 21 tries. He hit .286 for West Palm Beach and struck out in 3 of his 4 at-bats in his first Double-A exposure with the Harrisburg Senators.

In 1993, Woods returned to Harrisburg, batting .252. A year later, Woods split the year between Harrisburg (.316) and the Triple-A Ottawa Lynx (.224). On November 18, the Expos gave up on Woods and released him. Woods played for the Baltimore Orioles' Rochester Red Wings farm club in 1995, hitting .261 as a 1B/DH/OF.

A year later, Woods was in another system, joining the Boston Red Sox, playing for their Double-A affiliate, the Trenton Thunder, hitting .312, tying for 4th in the league in homers (25) and was among the leaders in average, OBP and slugging.

In 1997, Woods spent his 10th and final season in a United States-based league, hitting .352 for the Triple-A Pawtucket Red Sox. He homered 9 times and drove in 28 in 29 games but did not play for the parent Boston team.

He also played that year for the Potros de Minatitlán of the Mexican League, homering 18 times in 85 games for 27 homers and 101 runs (73 RBIs in 85 games for the Potros). Woods hit .342. His walk total (59) surpassed his K total (49).

=== Career in South Korea ===
1998 found Woods with Korea Professional Baseball in the first year where the league allowed foreign players to play. In his first at-bat, he hit a home run. Playing for the OB Bears (Doosan Bears), he set a KBO record with 42 home runs and became the first foreign player to win the MVP award. Two years later, he hit .315 with 39 homers and 111 RBIs and lost the home run race by one to Park Kyung-wan. In 2001, he won MVP honors in the All-Star game, playoffs and the Korean Series, in which he blasted four homers in six games for Doosan. In 2002, Woods hit just .256; he struck out 123 times in 407 at-bats though he did hit 25 homers. In five years in Korea, he hit 174 homers, drove in 510 runs and batted .294. Woods left Korea with the longest career of any foreign player in KBO history until 2005, when Jay Davis broke his mark. He was nominated as one of the 40 KBO legends as number 40 out of the 40 legends.

=== Yokohama BayStars ===
In 2003, Woods signed with the Yokohama BayStars, hitting .273 and tied for the home run lead with Alex Ramirez with 40. He was 6th in the Central League in slugging, 4th in walks (66) and 5th in RBIs (87) though he also led the league with 132 K's. Woods became the first man to lead a league in homers in both Korea and Japan.

Woods improved in his second year with Yokohama, hitting .298. He made the Best Nine at first base, tied Tuffy Rhodes for the home run lead with 45, was third in walks (74) and tied for third in RBIs (103). He was also 5th in slugging and 4th in OBP and OPS. He struck out 142 times, ranking him third in that category.

=== Chunichi Dragons ===
After the 2004 season, he signed with the defending CL champion Chunichi Dragons and hit .306 with 38 homers. He was third in OPS and homers, 5th in slugging, 4th in OBP, tied for 4th with 103 RBIs and ground into the most double plays (24) as the Dragons' 1B and cleanup hitter. Woods missed 10 games due to a suspension he served after charging the mound when Shugo Fujii threw high and inside during an at bat. Woods was also fined 500,000 yen.

After the 2005 season was completed, Woods had hit 421 homers in his pro career.

In 2006, Woods put together an MVP caliber season by batting .310 with a league-leading 47 homers and 144 RBIs. However, the MVP award that season went to his teammate, Kosuke Fukudome. To clinch the title for Chunichi, he hit grand slams in back-to-back games, the first Central Leaguer to do so since Fumio Fujimura 53 years earlier. He also set a new team record for home runs. He played for the Dragons until 2008.

== Pursuits outside baseball ==
In addition to playing baseball, Woods worked for a time for the Brooksville Fire Department in Florida.
