= List of Nippon Professional Baseball players (U) =

The following is a list of Nippon Professional Baseball players with the last name starting with U, retired or active.

== U ==
Name	Debut	Final Game	Position	Teams	Ref
Tatsuya Uchi	15 June 2004	11 April 2020	Pitcher	Chiba Lotte Marines	
Kazuya Uchida	3 September 2018		Outfielder	Tohoku Rakuten Golden Eagles	
Seiichi Uchikawa	30 March 2001	3 October 2022	Outfielder and Infielder	Yokohama DeNA BayStars	
Kensuke Uchimura	3 August 2008	3 October 2015	Second baseman, shortstop, and outfielder	Yokohama DeNA BayStars	
Takashi Uchinokura					
Tomoyuki Uchiyama					
Yusuke Uchiyama					
Naoki Uchizono					
Shinji Udaka					
Katsuya Udoh					
Daisuke Ue					
Hiroaki Ueda					
Toshiharu Ueda					
Tsuyoshi Ueda					
Yoshinori Ueda					
Yoshitake Ueda					
Yukihiro Ueda					
Akira Uehara					
Koji Uehara					
Kojiro Uehara					
Masatomo Uematsu					
Tatsuyuki Uemoto					
Kazuhiro Uemura					
Yoshinobu Uemura					
Yusuke Uemura					
Yoshinari Uenaka					
Hirofumi Ueno					
Tadashi Ueno					
Takahisa Ueno					
Yuhei Ueno					
Keiji Uezono					
Atsushi Ugumori					
Hiroshi Umeda					
Naomichi Umeda					
Nobuaki Umehara					
Manato Umemura					
Tomohiro Umetsu					
Masami Uno					
Mitsuo Uno					
Tim Unroe					
Salvatore Urso					
Yasuhiro Usami					
Shigeki Ushida					
Kazuhiko Ushijima					
Tsutomu Ushiyama					
Itaru Uto					
Tetsuya Utsumi					
