= 2016 Nippon Professional Baseball season =

2016 NPB season
- League: Nippon Professional Baseball
- Sport: Baseball
- Duration: March 25 – October 29

Central League pennant
- League champions: Hiroshima Toyo Carp
- Runners-up: Yomiuri Giants
- Season MVP: Takahiro Arai (Hiroshima)

Pacific League pennant
- League champions: Hokkaido Nippon-Ham Fighters
- Runners-up: Fukuoka SoftBank Hawks
- Season MVP: Shohei Ohtani (Nippon Ham)

Climax Series
- CL champions: Hiroshima Toyo Carp
- CL runners-up: Yokohama DeNA BayStars
- PL champions: Hokkaido Nippon-Ham Fighters
- PL runners-up: Fukuoka SoftBank Hawks

Japan Series
- Venue: Mazda Zoom-Zoom Stadium Hiroshima, Minami-ku, Hiroshima; Sapporo Dome, Sapporo, Hokkaidō
- Champions: Hokkaido Nippon-Ham Fighters
- Runners-up: Hiroshima Toyo Carp
- Finals MVP: Brandon Laird (Nippon Ham)

NPB seasons
- ← 2015 2017 →

Nippon Professional Baseball (NPB, 日本野球機構, Nippon Yakyū Kikō) is a professional baseball league, and the highest level of baseball in Japan. The NPB is organized into two leagues, the Central League and the Pacific League. After the regular season, the top three teams of each league play off in the Climax Series, which determines which team from each league will play off in the Japan Series to determine the national championship team. The 2016 Nippon Professional Baseball season was the 67th season since the NPB was reorganized in 1950. The Japan Series championship competition was played between the Hokkaido Nippon-Ham Fighters and the Hiroshima Toyo Carp, with the Nippon-Ham fighters winning the overall championship.

== Incidents ==
A gambling scandal involving members of the Yomiuri Giants was reported in October. Pitchers Satoshi Fukuda, Shoki Kasahara, and Ryuya Matsumoto were found to have bet on both NPB games and Major League Baseball games, as well as high school baseball. While there was no suspicion of match fixing, Sports Gambling is illegal in Japan. The players involved were received suspensions, and members of team management resigned to take responsibility for the scandal.

== Regular season standings ==
Central League regular season standings
Pos	Team	G	W	L	T	Pct.	GB	Home	Road
1	Hiroshima Toyo Carp	143	89	52	2	.631	—	51–20–1	38–32–1
2	Yomiuri Giants	143	71	69	3	.507	17.5	40–31–1	31–38–2
3	Yokohama DeNA BayStars	143	69	71	3	.493	19.5	38–33–1	31–38–2
4	Hanshin Tigers	143	64	76	3	.457	24.5	31–39–1	33–37–2
5	Tokyo Yakult Swallows	143	64	78	1	.451	25.5	40–30–1	24–48–0
6	Chunichi Dragons	143	58	82	3	.414	30.5	32–36–3	26–46–0

Pacific League regular season standings
Pos	Team	G	W	L	T	Pct.	GB	Home	Road
1	Hokkaido Nippon-Ham Fighters	143	87	53	3	.621	—	45–24–2	42–29–1
2	Fukuoka SoftBank Hawks	143	83	54	6	.606	2.5	40–28–3	43–26–3
3	Chiba Lotte Marines	143	72	68	3	.514	15.0	38–33–1	34–35–2
4	Saitama Seibu Lions	143	64	76	3	.457	23.0	34–36–1	30–40–2
5	Tohoku Rakuten Golden Eagles	143	62	78	3	.443	25.0	36–35–1	26–43–2
6	Orix Buffaloes	143	57	83	3	.407	30.0	30–40–2	27–43–1

== Climax Series ==
Note: In each league's stepladder playoff system (Climax Series), all games in that series are held at the higher seed's home stadium. The team with the higher regular-season standing also advanced if the round ended in a tie.

First stage
Central League
2	Yomiuri Giants	1
3	Yokohama DeNA BayStars	2
Pacific League
2	Fukuoka SoftBank Hawks	2
3	Chiba Lotte Marines	0

Final stage
1	Hiroshima Toyo Carp	4
3	Yokohama DeNA BayStars	1
1	Hokkaido Nippon-Ham Fighters	4
2	Fukuoka SoftBank Hawks	2

Japan Series
CL1	Hiroshima Toyo Carp	2
PL1	Hokkaido Nippon-Ham Fighters	4

=== First stage ===
==== Central League ====
Yomiuri Giants (1) vs. Yokohama DeNA BayStars (2)

Game	Date	Score	Location	Time	Attendance
1	October 8	Yokohama DeNA BayStars – 5, Yomiuri Giants – 3	Tokyo Dome	3:19	45,633
2	October 9	Yokohama DeNA BayStars – 1, Yomiuri Giants – 2	Tokyo Dome	2:47	45,683
3	October 10*	Yokohama DeNA BayStars – 4, Yomiuri Giants – 3	Tokyo Dome	4:21	45,477

==== Pacific League ====
Fukuoka SoftBank Hawks (2) vs. Chiba Lotte Marines (0)

Game	Date	Score	Location	Time	Attendance
1	October 8	Chiba Lotte Marines – 3, Fukuoka SoftBank Hawks – 4	Fukuoka Yahuoku! Dome	3:10	36,077
2	October 9	Chiba Lotte Marines – 1, Fukuoka SoftBank Hawks – 4	Fukuoka Yahuoku! Dome	3:16	38,500

=== Final stage ===
==== Central League ====
Hiroshima Toyo Carp (4) vs. Yokohama DeNA BayStars (1)

Game	Date	Score	Location	Time	Attendance
1	October 12	Yokohama DeNA BayStars – 0, Hiroshima Toyo Carp – 5	Mazda Stadium	2:48	31,276
2	October 13	Yokohama DeNA BayStars – 0, Hiroshima Toyo Carp – 3	Mazda Stadium	2:58	31,264
3	October 14	Yokohama DeNA BayStars – 3, Hiroshima Toyo Carp – 0	Mazda Stadium	3:19	31,291
4	October 15	Yokohama DeNA BayStars – 7, Hiroshima Toyo Carp – 8	Mazda Stadium	3:26	31,313

==== Pacific League ====
Hokkaido Nippon-Ham Fighters (4) vs. Fukuoka SoftBank Hawks (2)

Game	Date	Score	Location	Time	Attendance
1	October 12	Fukuoka SoftBank Hawks – 0, Hokkaido Nippon-Ham Fighters – 6	Sapporo Dome	2:55	36,633
2	October 13	Fukuoka SoftBank Hawks – 6, Hokkaido Nippon-Ham Fighters – 4	Sapporo Dome	3:40	26,548
3	October 14	Fukuoka SoftBank Hawks – 1, Hokkaido Nippon-Ham Fighters – 4	Sapporo Dome	3:17	39,456
4	October 15	Fukuoka SoftBank Hawks – 5, Hokkaido Nippon-Ham Fighters – 2	Sapporo Dome	3:07	41,138
5	October 16	Fukuoka SoftBank Hawks – 4, Hokkaido Nippon-Ham Fighters – 7	Sapporo Dome	3:15	41,138

== Japan Series ==
Hiroshima Toyo Carp (2) vs. Hokkaido Nippon-Ham Fighters (4)

Game	Date	Score	Location	Time	Attendance
1	October 22	Hokkaido Nippon-Ham Fighters – 1, Hiroshima Toyo Carp – 5	Mazda Stadium	3:39	30,619
2	October 23	Hokkaido Nippon-Ham Fighters – 1, Hiroshima Toyo Carp – 5	Mazda Stadium	3:18	30,638
3	October 25	Hiroshima Toyo Carp – 3, Hokkaido Nippon-Ham Fighters – 4 (10)	Sapporo Dome	3:51	40,503
4	October 26	Hiroshima Toyo Carp – 1, Hokkaido Nippon-Ham Fighters – 3	Sapporo Dome	3:30	40,599
5	October 27	Hiroshima Toyo Carp – 1, Hokkaido Nippon-Ham Fighters – 5	Sapporo Dome	3:32	40,633
6	October 29	Hokkaido Nippon-Ham Fighters – 10, Hiroshima Toyo Carp – 4	Mazda Stadium	4:01	30,693

== League leaders ==
=== Central League ===
Batting leaders
Stat	Player	Team	Total
Batting average	Hayato Sakamoto	Yomiuri Giants	.344
Home runs	Yoshitomo Tsutsugo	Yokohama DeNA BayStars	44
Runs batted in	Yoshitomo Tsutsugo	Yokohama DeNA BayStars	110
Runs	Tetsuto Yamada; Kosuke Tanaka	Tokyo Yakult Swallows; Hiroshima Toyo Carp	102
Hits	Ryosuke Kikuchi	Hiroshima Toyo Carp	181
Stolen bases	Tetsuto Yamada	Tokyo Yakult Swallows	30

Pitching leaders
Stat	Player	Team	Total
Wins	Yusuke Nomura	Hiroshima Toyo Carp	16
Losses	Atsushi Nomi; Hirofumi Yamanaka	Hanshin Tigers; Tokyo Yakult Swallows	12
Earned run average	Tomoyuki Sugano	Yomiuri Giants	2.01
Strikeouts	Tomoyuki Sugano	Yomiuri Giants	189
Innings pitched	Randy Messenger	Hanshin Tigers	185.1
Saves	Hirokazu Sawamura	Yomiuri Giants	37

=== Pacific League ===
Batting leaders
Stat	Player	Team	Total
Batting average	Katsuya Kakunaka	Chiba Lotte Marines	.339
Home runs	Brandon Laird	Hokkaido Nippon-Ham Fighters	39
Runs batted in	Sho Nakata	Hokkaido Nippon-Ham Fighters	110
Runs	Shogo Akiyama	Saitama Seibu Lions	98
Hits	Katsuya Kakunaka	Chiba Lotte Marines	176
Stolen bases	Yoshio Itoi; Yuji Kaneko	Orix Buffaloes; Saitama Seibu Lions	53

Pitching leaders
Stat	Player	Team	Total
Wins	Tsuyoshi Wada	Fukuoka SoftBank Hawks	15
Losses	Yuki Nishi	Orix Buffaloes	12
Earned run average	Ayumu Ishikawa	Chiba Lotte Marines	2.16
Strikeouts	Takahiro Norimoto	Tohoku Rakuten Golden Eagles	216
Innings pitched	Takahiro Norimoto	Tohoku Rakuten Golden Eagles	195
Saves	Yoshihisa Hirano	Orix Buffaloes	31

== Attendances ==
Team	Total attendance	Home average
Yomiuri Giants	3,004,108	41,724
Hanshin Tigers	2,910,562	40,994
Fukuoka SoftBank Hawks	2,492,983	35,112
Hiroshima Toyo Carp	2,157,331	29,963
Hokkaido Nippon-Ham Fighters	2,078,981	29,281
Chunichi Dragons	2,058,381	28,991
Yokohama DeNA Baystars	1,939,146	26,933
Tokyo Yakult Swallows	1,779,460	25,063
ORIX Buffaloes	1,794,475	24,923
Saitama Seibu Lions	1,618,194	22,791
Tohoku Rakuten Golden Eagles	1,620,961	22,513
Chiba Lotte Marines	1,526,932	21,207

This was a very small increase on attendance from the 2015 season.

== See also ==
- 2016 KBO League season
- 2016 Major League Baseball season
