= Tetsuto Yamada =

Japanese baseball player (born 1992)

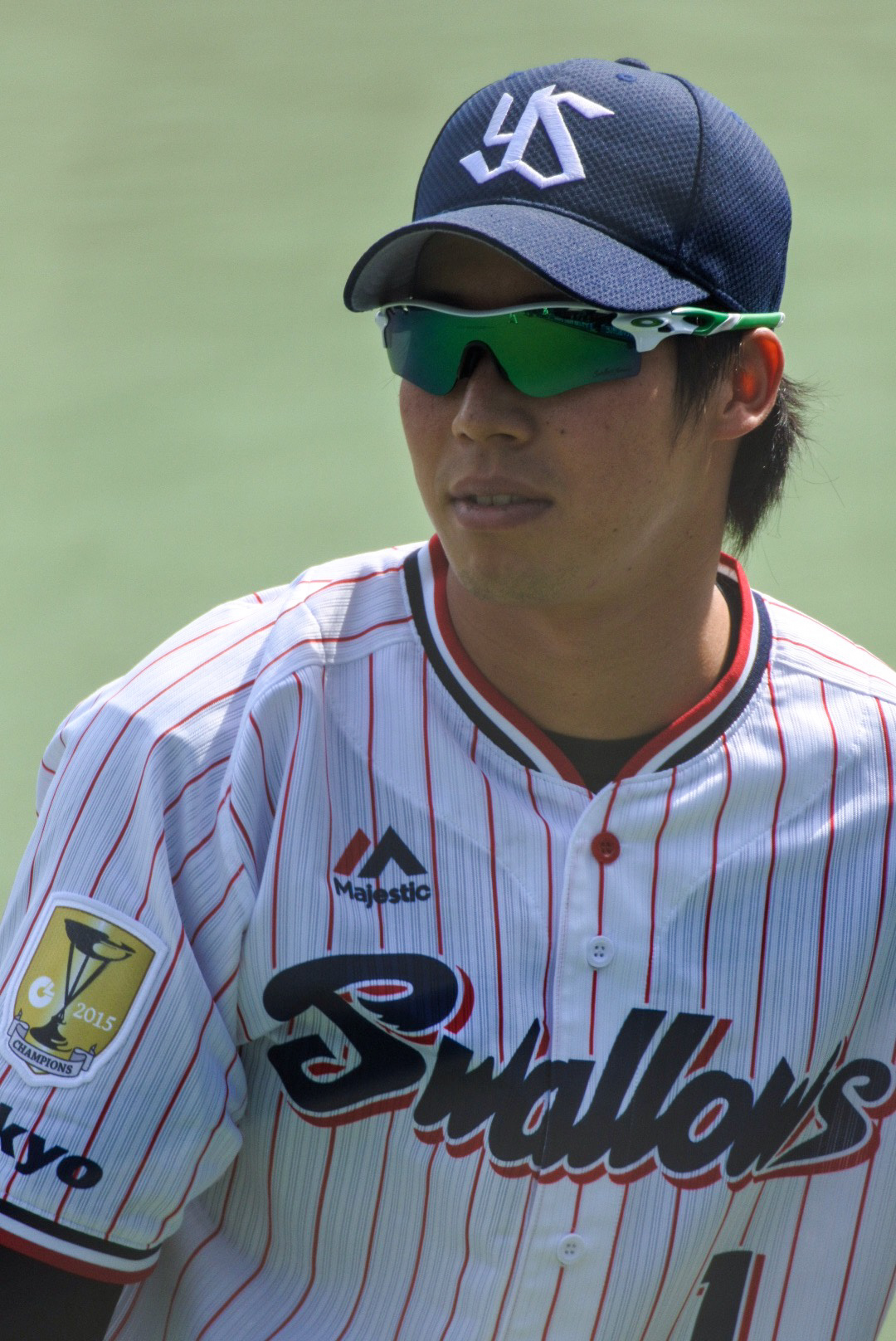
- Yamada with the Tokyo Yakult Swallows in 2016

Tokyo Yakult Swallows – No. 1
- Second baseman
- Born: July 16, 1992 (age 34); Toyooka, Hyōgo Prefecture, Japan
- Bats: Right Throws: Right

NPB debut
- April 5, 2012, for the Tokyo Yakult Swallows

NPB statistics (through 2026 season)
- Batting average: .276
- Hits: 1,658
- Home runs: 313
- Runs batted in: 923
- Stolen bases: 198
- Stats at Baseball Reference

Teams
- Tokyo Yakult Swallows (2011–present)

Career highlights and awards
- NPB: Japan Series champion (2021); Interleague play CL Nippon Life Award Winner (2014); Central League MVP (2015); Central League Home Run Leader (2015); 3× Central League Stolen Base Leader (2015-2016, 2018); 6× Best Nine Award (2014-2016, 2018-2019, 2021); 7× NPB All-Star (2014–2016, 2018–2019, 2021, 2022); Hochi Professional Sports Award (2015); Commissioner's Special Award (2016); 2× Central League Federation Special Awards (2015, 2018); 3× Tsubame City Annual Hero Award (2014-2016); Hit 4 home runs in one game on August 21, 2015 vs. Chunichi Dragons at (Meiji Jingu Stadium); International: Tokyo 2020 Baseball Most Valuable Player (2021)
Medals
Men's baseball
Representing Japan
World Baseball Classic
Gold medal – first place	2023 Miami	Team
Summer Olympics
Gold medal – first place	2020 Tokyo	Team
WBSC Premier12
Bronze medal – third place	2015 Tokyo	Team
Gold medal – first place	2019 Tokyo	Team

Tetsuto Yamada (山田 哲人, Yamada Tetsuto; born July 16, 1992) is a Japanese professional baseball infielder for the Tokyo Yakult Swallows of Nippon Professional Baseball (NPB). Yamada made his NPB debut in 2012 with Yakult, and has played with them for his whole career. He has won the Central League MVP award, has received the Best Nine Award six times, has been selected to six NPB All-Star Series appearances, and has a Japan Series championship. He has led the Central League in stolen bases three times and home runs once, hitting 30 home runs and stealing 30 bases in a single season on four occasions. In 2014 he broke the single season record for most hits by a Japanese right-hander in the NPB, and in 2015 became the first player in NPB history to lead his league in home runs and stolen bases in the same season. He has been compared to Mike Trout for his combination of power and speed. Yamada has also been nicknamed "Mr. Triple Three", as he is the only player in NPB history to accomplish the "triple three" (30 home runs, 30 stolen bases, and a batting average of .300 in a single season) three times. He is currently the last NPB player to accomplish the feat in a season.

Yamada has also played for the Japanese national team Samurai Japan. In 2014 and 2018, he won the MLB Japan All-Star Series with them. He has played for Japan in the WBSC Premier12 tournaments of 2015 and 2019, and was on the Japanese team during the 2017 World Baseball Classic. In 2021, he was selected to the host nation's team for the 2020 Tokyo Olympics, where he won both the gold medal and the MVP award.

== Early life ==
Yamada was born in Toyooka, Hyōgo Prefecture, Japan. His father, Tomonori, was a police officer who had competed in Shorinji Kempo in high school. As a child, Yamada did karate and gymnastics, and played soccer when he was in first grade. He started playing baseball as an outfielder in Takarazuka Little League when he was in second grade. After starting middle school, Yamada played for Hyōgo Itami, a team in the Japanese youth baseball organization Young League.

He and his family moved to Toyonaka, Osaka when he started attending Riseisha Senior High School. In summer of his freshman year he started on the bench, and started playing second base regularly in the summer of his sophomore year. That fall, he started playing shortstop, showing great defensive ability and leading his team with a .435 batting average in the spring of his junior year; that term his team won the Osaka tournament and finished second in the Kinki regional tournament. In the Summer Koshien of his junior year, he contributed to Riseisha's first win by stealing home in the second round against Tenri High School. In a game against Seiko Gakuin, Yamada hit a home run off Hiroaki Saiuchi, but his team would end up losing. Kouta Inoue, who would later join the Hanshin Tigers, said that home run made him want to attend Riseisha.

In the first round of the 2010 Nippon Professional Baseball (NPB) draft, Yamada was named by the Tokyo Yakult Swallows and the Orix Buffaloes. Yakult won the rights to his negotiation, and he signed with them for a 7.2 million yen contract on November 25, 2010.

== Professional career ==
=== Early career (2011-2013) ===
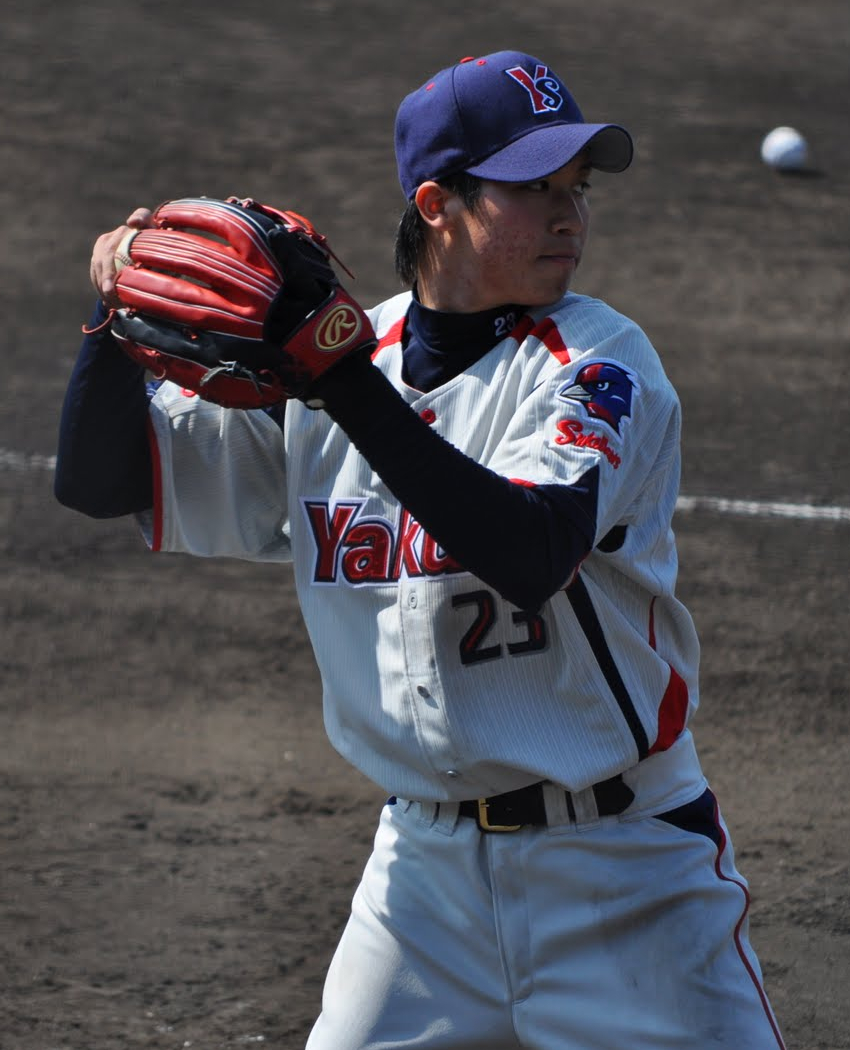
Yamada wearing number 23 during the 2011 preseason at Urasoe Municipal Baseball Stadium

Yamada did not play in any regular season games with Yakult in 2011, but played in every game with the Eastern League farm team; however, due to injuries on the main roster, he started the second game of the final Climax Series stage against the Chunichi Dragons at shortstop, going 0-for-4. He was the first ever rookie out of high school to start in the Climax Series. In the fourth game of the series, he recorded his first NPB hit with a 2-out double down the right-field line in the 8th inning, but also committed a costly throwing error in the bottom of the first inning that lead to 4 runs in a 5–1 loss for Yakult.

His first regular season appearance came on April 5, 2012, in a pinch-hit at bat, during which he also recorded his first hit. On August 10, 2012, he recorded his first home run in a game against the Yomiuri Giants. For Yakult's farm team in 2012, he had a batting average of almost .300.

The following season, due to Yamada's defensive difficulties at shortstop and an offensive slump for Yakult 2nd baseman Hiroyasu Tanaka, Yamada was mostly a fixture at second base after being promoted to the main team in May. On October 6, he hit his first professional grand slam homer off Kenta Maeda of the Hiroshima Toyo Carp. Although he had not yet shown much power as he did not hit any homers until the end of the season, he demonstrated a good eye at the plate, recording a .354 on-base percentage, and also stole nine bases. By his third year out of high school, he had achieved a level of consistency on the main Yakult team.

=== Breakout and MVP performance (2014-2015) ===
==== 2014 season ====
In 2014, Yamada's hitting improved significantly under the one-on-one guidance of hitting coach Shigeru Sugimura. Throughout the 2014 season, Yamada continued demonstrating excellent plate discipline, and his ability to hit for home runs was greatly improved from previous seasons. He became the first player in NPB history to hit a first-inning lead-off homer in six consecutive months (from April to September). After being selected to his first All-Star Series by his manager's recommendation, he won the Fighting Spirit Award with two hits in the second game, including a home run. In August, he recorded a league-leading 41 hits and won his first MVP of the month award. On October 6, in a game against the Yokohama DeNA BayStars, Yamada went 4-for-5 with a go-ahead grand slam in the 8th inning, which broke the single-season hits record for a Japanese right-handed batter set by Fumio Fujimura in 1950. He ended the regular season with a high batting average of .324 and hitting 29 home runs. His on-base plus slugging percentage of .941 was second in the league, and he led the league in weighted runs above average with 48.4, indicating how many runs he produced compared to the average player. Sugimura had initially expected Yamada to be a mid-range hitter who could hit the ball to all fields, but was surprised by his development into a power hitter with a high on-base percentage. During the off-season on October 9, Yamada was selected to represent Japan in the MLB Japan All-Star Series. In the training game, he played first base for the first time since joining professional baseball.

==== 2015 season (MVP award) ====
After Yamada's strong offensive performance the previous year, Sugimura said before the 2015 season that he thought Yamada had the potential to accomplish a "triple three"—a .300 batting average, 30 home runs, and 30 stolen bases in a single season; this was despite his relatively low stolen base total of 15 in 2014. In the middle of the season, Yakult manager Mitsuru Manaka decided to move Yamada to third in the lineup, leading to improvements in his hitting. Yamada had an excellent summer, winning the MVP of the month award in three consecutive months from July to September. Between an at-bat on August 21 and three at-bats on August 22 against Chunichi, he hit four home runs in a row, tying an NPB record. With this series of homers, he also cleared the 30 home run mark for the first time in his career. On September 6, in a game against Hiroshima, he stole his 30th stolen base, which secured a triple three in his 2015 season, becoming the first NPB player to accomplish the feat since Matsui Akira in 2002 and the ninth in NPB history, as well as the youngest ever in the Central League.

He finished the 2015 season with a .329 batting average, 38 home runs, 100 runs batted in, and 34 stolen bases, which were all career highs. He finished first in the league in home runs, stolen bases, and on-base percentage, finishing second in batting average, hits, and runs batted in. It was the first time in NPB history that a player won both the home run and stolen base titles in the same season. He was named the Central League MVP. His season performance greatly contributed to Yakult advancing to the 2015 Japan Series against the Fukuoka SoftBank Hawks. In Game 3, Yamada hit three consecutive home runs in one game for the first time in the Series' history. (Note: Including records that span games, he is the second player in 45 years to hit three consecutive home runs in the Japan Series since Shigeo Nagashima (Giants) in the 1970.) Yakult would lose the series 1–4, but Yamada won the Fighting Spirit Award, given to the most valuable player on the losing team. In assessing his MVP season in October 2015, the Japan Times wrote, "Yamada had a 2015 the likes of which is seldom seen in Japanese baseball."

On December 8, during the off-season, Yakult renewed Yamada's contract, signing him for an annual salary of 220 million yen. The team also announced that his uniform number would be changed from 23, which he had been wearing in previous seasons, to 1 starting in the 2016 season. The jersey number 1 has been historically worn by prominent Yakult players; in a special ceremony, Yamada was given his New Jersey by Nori Aoki. Yamada expressed that although he felt some added pressure in inheriting a jersey number with such significance, he would do his best to live up to expectations.

=== Continuing success and multiple triple threes (2016-2019) ===
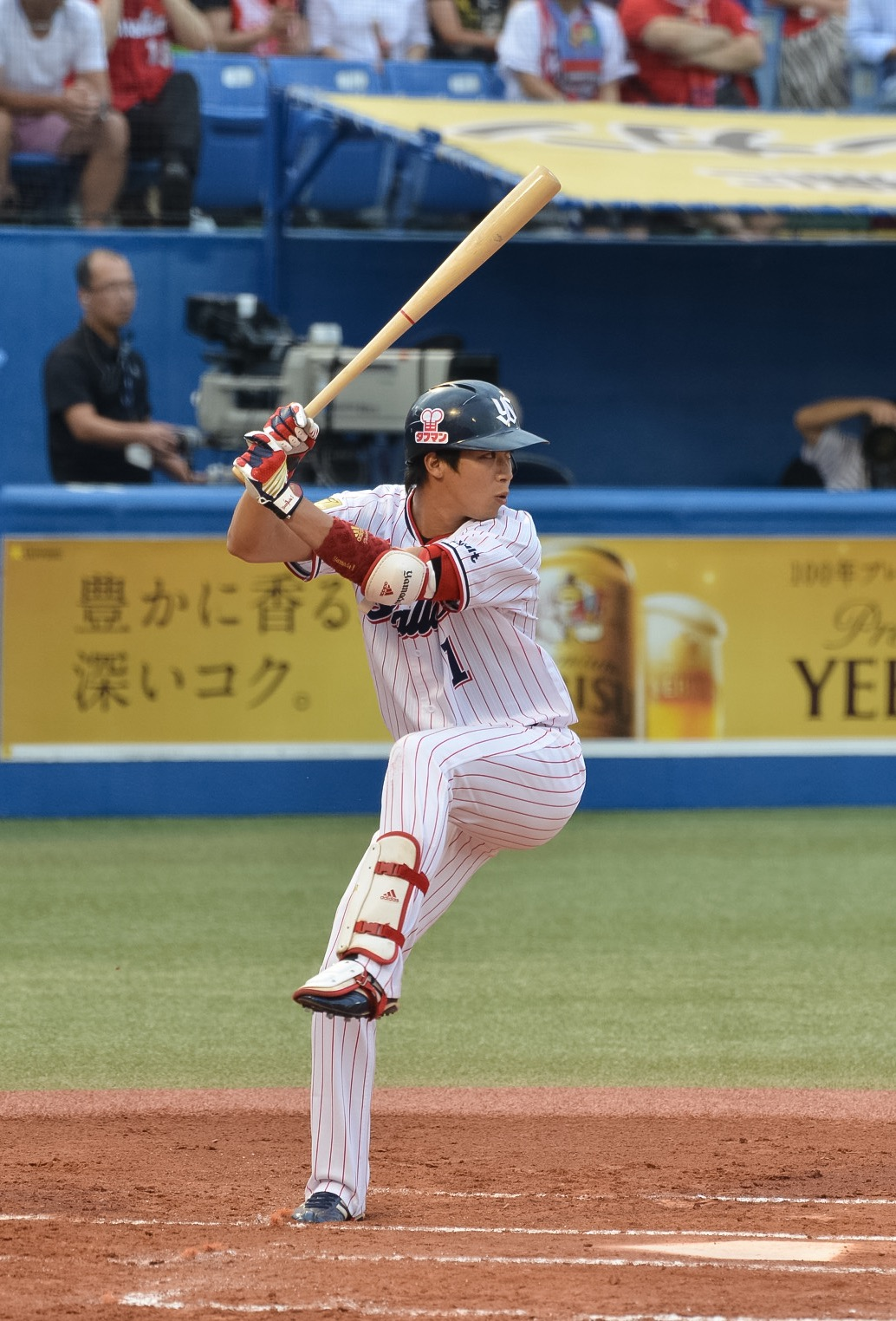
Yamada batting in 2016

In 2016, he was selected to represent Japan in the Samurai Japan training match against Chinese Taipei on February 15, before the season started. In June of the regular season, he played in 23 games and ranked first in the league in batting average, home runs, and runs batted in with a .346 batting average, 28 hits, 10 home runs, and 28 runs batted in, earning him his fifth monthly MVP award, tying Alex Ramírez for a Yakult record. However, on July 30, in a game against the Giants at Tokyo Dome, he was hit in the back by a pitch. He continued to appear in games, but on August 9 he complained of pain and was replaced midway through the game. He was diagnosed with a contusion of the left eighth rib, and was struck from the roster on August 10. After a two-week absence, he returned to the lineup and showed signs of recovery, hitting three homers in one game against the Hanshin Tigers on September 10, but was hit again in the back by a pitch in his first at-bat against Hanshin the next day. Although he appeared to be in great pain for several minutes, he stayed in the game. Despite his injury, he ended the season hitting .304 with 38 home runs and 30 stolen bases, achieving a second consecutive triple three. It was the first time in NPB history that a player had achieved a triple three in consecutive years. He also won the stolen base title for a second year in a row and led the league in walks.

In 2017, he was the only player on the team to play a full inning in every game, despite struggling with lower body conditions. However, he continued to underperform throughout the year, and finished the season with a .247 batting average, 24 home runs, and 14 stolen bases. Yakult had a very poor season overall, losing a franchise record 96 games.

In 2018, Yamada aimed to get another triple-three. He broke free of his slump from the previous year and was consistent from the start of the season. He reached a double digit home run count for the fifth consecutive season with a solo homer on May 11 against Yokohama. In a home game against Chunichi on June 28, he recorded his first professional walk-off hit with a three-run home run in the bottom of the ninth inning. On July 9 in an away game against the Giants, he became the first player born in the Heisei era to hit for the cycle. On his birthday he had a ninth inning RBI that tied the game and allowed Yakult to complete a comeback victory against DeNA. His 12-game RBI streak from July 20 to August 4 ranks second all-time in the NPB. He reached the 30 stolen base mark again on August 31 against Hiroshima. He finished the 2018 season with a .315 batting average, 34 home runs, and 33 stolen bases, achieving the third triple three of his career. He also posted an OPS of 1.014 and led a strong Yakult lineup. He was named to the NPB Best Nine for the first time in two years.

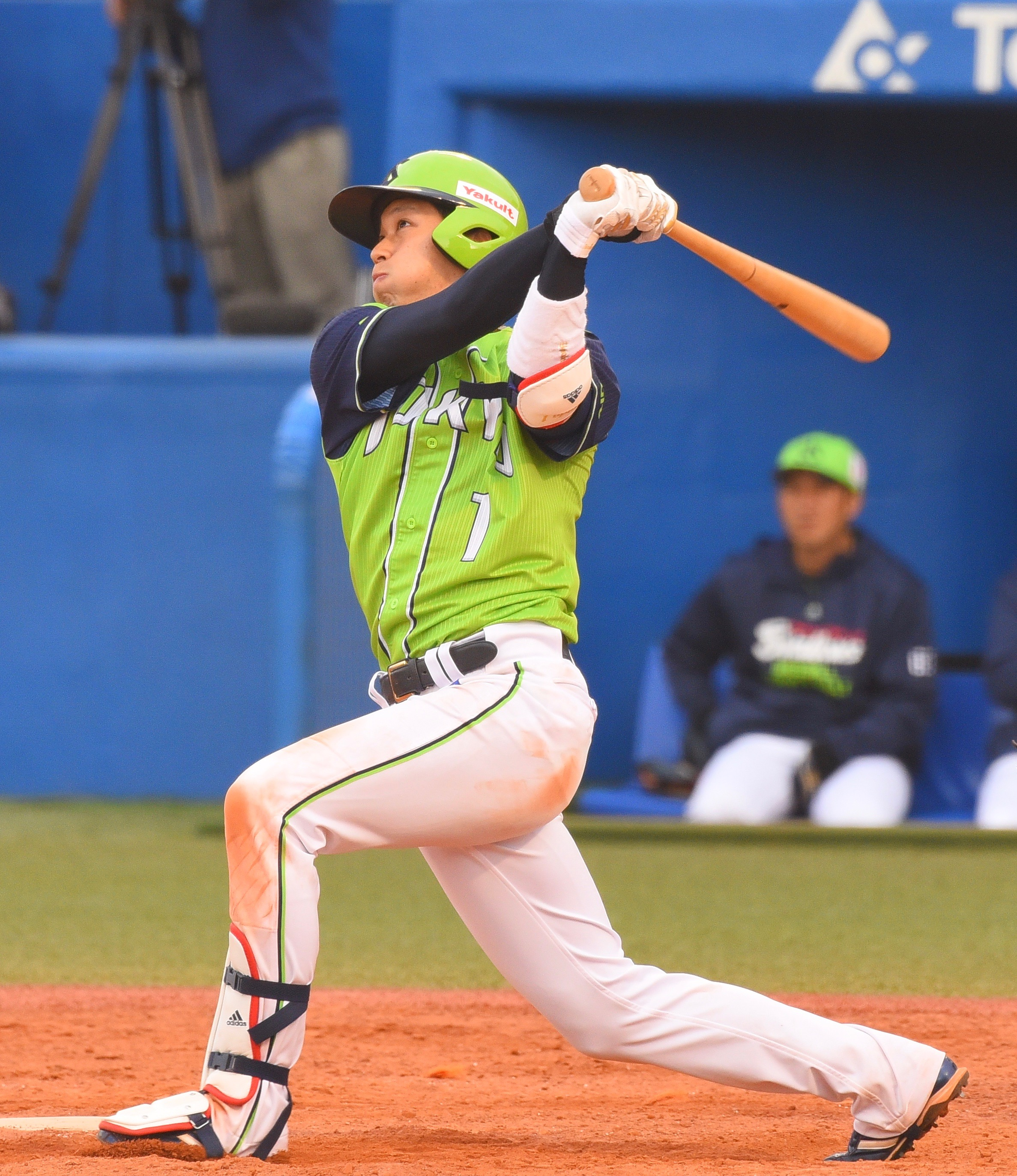
Yamada batting for Yakult in 2018

In 2019, Aoki, Yamada, and Wladimir Balentien hit three consecutive home runs off Tomoyuki Sugano on April 26 against the Giants at Yakult's home Meiji Jingu Stadium. A month later, on May 26, the same trio again hit three consecutive home runs. On September 4 against Hiroshima, Yamada hit a grand slam, bringing his career home run total to 200. At 27 years and one month old, he was the fifth youngest player in NPB history to reach the milestone and the youngest in franchise history. He also set a new NPB record by successfully stealing 38 consecutive bases, continuing a streak from the previous year, until he was caught stealing against DeNA on September 14. On December 24, he renewed his contract with an estimated salary of 500 million yen.

=== Struggles and Japan Series Championship (2020-present) ===
On June 28, 2020, in a game against the Giants at Jingu Stadium, he hit a 6th-inning grand slam off Takahiro Fujioka. On August 30 at Yokohama Stadium against DeNA, he hit his sixth career grand slam off Kosuke Sakaguchi with two outs in the second inning, for his second grand slam of the season. He hit two grand slams that year, and on September 20 against Hiroshima at Jingu Stadium, he hit a three-run homer for the second year in a row off Yuta Nakamura, with Taiki Hamada, Nobuchika Aoki, and Yamada. In the 2020 season he posted his worst batting average, slugging percentage, and OPS since 2014. On September 3, he acquired free agent rights in Japan and his status attracted a lot of attention, but he decided to stay with Yakult instead of exercising his free agent rights, and signed a new seven-year contract with an estimated annual salary of 500 million yen plus piecework. He also volunteered to replace Aoki as team captain starting in 2021.

Yamada's slump continued into the start of the 2021 season, but his performance gradually improved after the start of interleague play. He made his sixth appearance in the 2021 All-Star Series, where he celebrated his 29th birthday during the first game. He hit his 30th home run on September 26, a grand slam off Shinnosuke Ogasawara against Chunichi at Jingu Stadium, marking his fifth 30-homer season. In that game he had two home runs and seven RBIs. Although his stolen base attempts were greatly reduced due to a leg condition he suffered from throughout the season, he was fourth in the league with 34 home runs, third with 101 runs batted in, and fourth with an OPS of .885. As captain, he also went to the mound to inspire pitchers in a pinch and actively gave advice to younger players on the bench. He formed a strong duo with Munetaka Murakami who was batting fourth, and Yakult reversed their poor performances of the past two years to top the Central League standings at the end of the season. In the Japan Series against the Orix Buffaloes, he hit a game-tying three-run homer off Tyler Higgins in the 8th inning of Game 5, tying him with Katsuo Osugi and Takahiro Ikeyama for the most Japan Series home runs in franchise history. Although Yamada was in a slump with a .167 batting average in the series overall, the team won its first championship in 20 years. After the season he said he was aiming for a fourth triple three in 2022 as well as becoming a great defender and winning another championship.

Yamada was determined to be aggressive on the base paths in order to achieve another triple three in the 2022 season. In his first at-bat on Opening Day, he was hit by a pitch from Shintaro Fujinami. Later that game, he hit a game-tying solo home run in the top of the ninth inning to contribute to a 7-run comeback victory, the largest in Opening Day history. He was a key figure in Yakult's victory in interleague play. After contracting COVID-19 in July, his condition, which had been seeming to improve, worsened and he began to slump further. According to his teammates, after a sixth consecutive Yakult loss in August, Yamada tearfully . By the end of the season he posted 23 home runs, an OPS of .800, and a league-worst 140 strikeouts. His on-base percentage of .333 was the worst since he became a regular starter. In spite of Yamada's individual struggles, Yakult secured the Central League pennant for a second consecutive year.

In 2023, he injured his lower body in a game against DeNA on April 12, was removed from the roster the next day, and returned to the starting lineup on April 28. On May 23, he hit a two-run homer in the 6th inning of a home game against Hanshin, becoming the third player in history to hit 150 homers at Jingu Stadium. He injured his right leg in a game against Hiroshima on July 2, and was struck from the roster the next day. He returned to the roster on August 1, and on August 13 he hit a two-run home run against Hanshin, achieving a double-digit home run total in 10 consecutive seasons, tying a franchise record with Katsumi Hirosawa. In Yakult's final game of the season, Yamada hit a walk-off sacrifice fly, which saved Yakult from finishing last in the Central League. He finished the season with a .231 batting average, 14 home runs, and 40 runs batted in in 105 games, marking the first time in 10 years that he did not have enough at-bats to qualify for the batting title rankings.

== International career ==
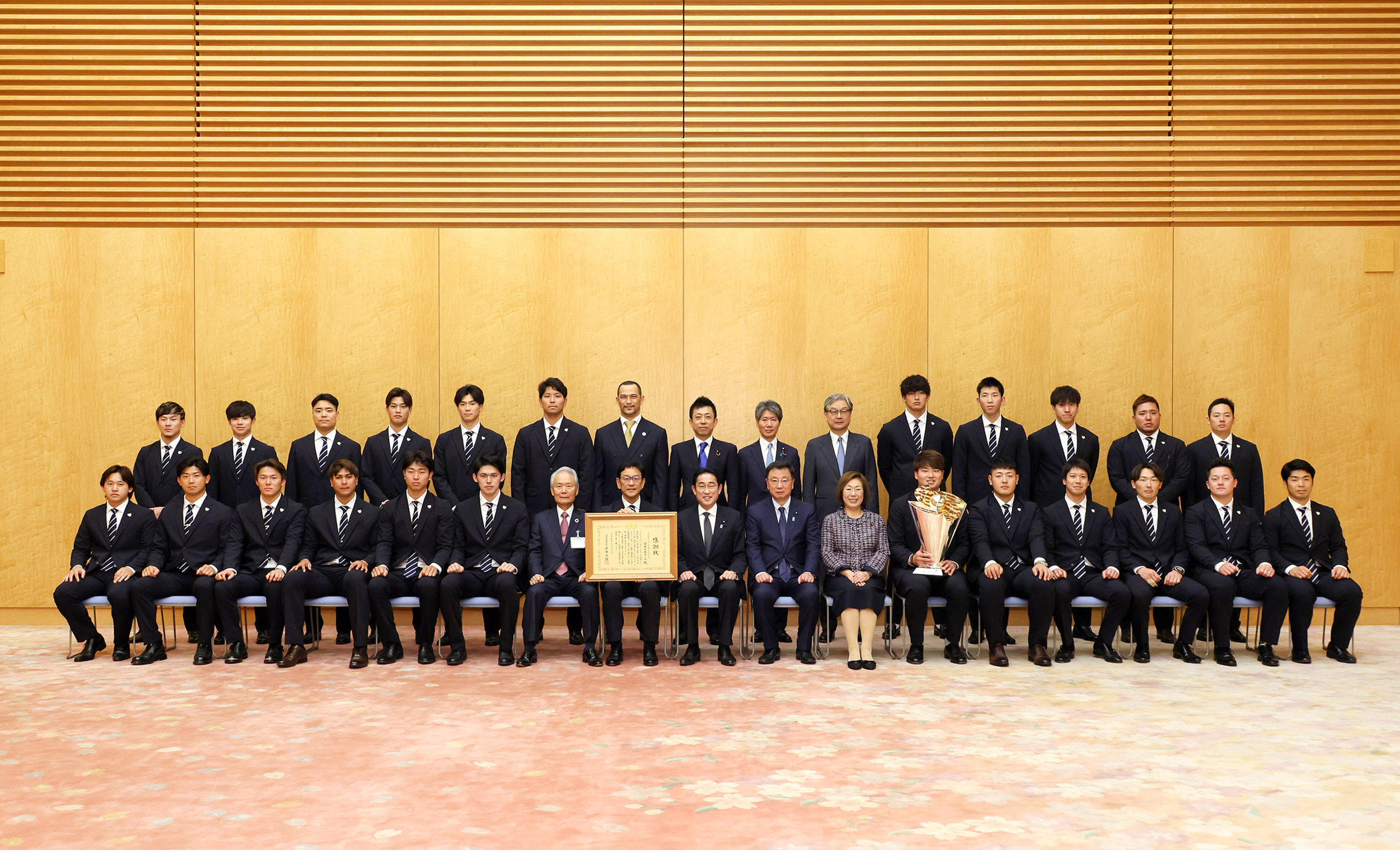
Yamada (bottom row, fourth from right) with Samurai Japan, visiting Japanese Prime Minister Fumio Kishida in 2023 after winning the 5th World Baseball Classic

=== Japanese national team ===
On October 9, 2015, Yamada was named to the Japanese national team, Samurai Japan, for the inaugural WBSC Premier12, in which Japan won the bronze medal. He again represented Japan in the 2019 WBSC Premier12. He struggled offensively for most of the tournament, but drove in two runs in the team's penultimate game and hit a three-run homer in the championship game to help Japan win the tournament for the first time. He represented Japan in the 4th World Baseball Classic held in March 2017. He played primarily as the designated hitter in the leadoff spot, and hit two home runs in one game against Cuba in the second round, becoming the eighth batter in tournament history to do so. He was selected to represent Japan in the 5th World Baseball Classic before the start of the 2023 season.

On October 10, 2018, he was selected to play in the 2018 MLB Japan All-Star Series.

In 2021, Yamada played for Team Japan at the 2020 Olympics in Tokyo. Overall, he went 7-for-20 with a home run and seven RBIs, starting in all five games the team played. He hit a 3-run home run in the third inning of a 7–4 win over Mexico. His bases-loaded double in the semifinal round against South Korea gave Japan a 5–2 lead, which they maintained and secured a spot in the final. In the gold medal match versus the United States, he scored the second of two runs in Japan's 2–0 victory. Yamada was named the Tokyo 2020 MVP by the World Baseball Softball Confederation.

==== Overturned home run in the 2017 WBC ====
During the fourth round of the 2017 World Baseball Classic, in the fourth inning of a game against Cuba, Yamada hit a ball to left field that was caught by a junior high school student in the stands. The hit was initially ruled a home run, but upon replay review the call was overturned and it was ruled a double instead. Following the play, the student received a large amount of criticism on the internet, and users identified his Twitter account. Comments about the incident falsely attributed to Yamada were also spread on the internet.

After the game, Yamada did comment on the play, saying that he did not mind the student catching the ball, and expressed his desire for the boy to continue to attend baseball games.

== Player profile ==
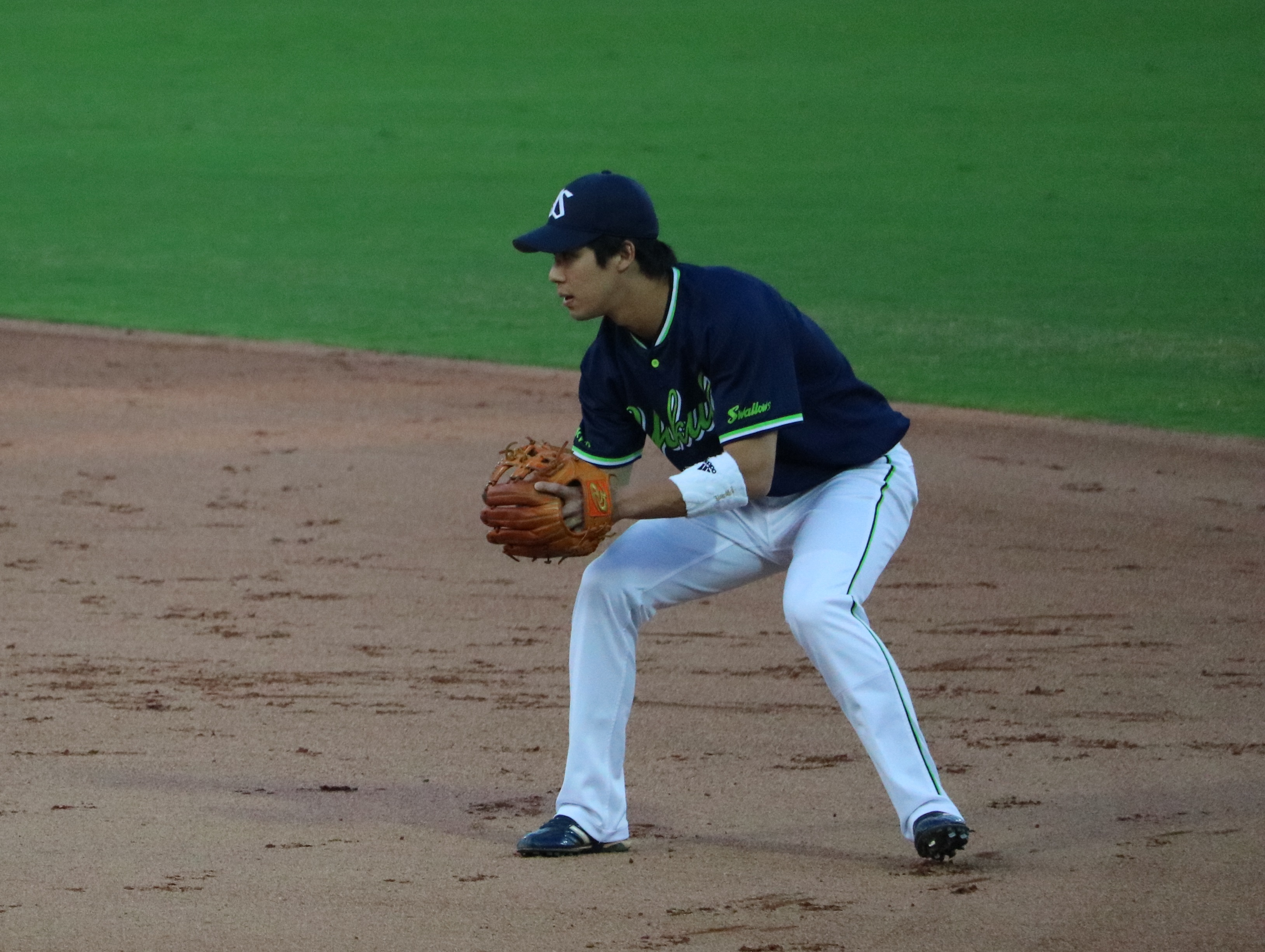
Yamada taking fielding practice in 2017 at Mazda Stadium

=== Batting ===
Yamada was well-regarded for his power before he became a professional player, hitting 31 home runs in high school. Although he has been called the best NPB player in terms of power and speed, Yamada does not call himself a home run hitter. He is a right-handed hitter who has always had a strong tendency to pull the ball into left field, and has been increasing that percentage year by year. Multiple foreign players in the league have said that Yamada, despite his relatively small size, can hit for home runs so well because of his ability to hit under the ball and apply backspin, as well as his quick bat speed. Yakult's home Jingu Stadium is one of the smallest stadiums in NPB, contributing to players' ability to hit home runs there, but in 2018 Yamada's average home run distance at Jingu was 121.7 m, with only a few home runs that were aided by the stadium dimensions.

He swings very infrequently, with a 38.8% swing rate in 2014, the seventh lowest among qualifying NPB batters, and 36.6% as of the end of May 2016, the third lowest among qualifying hitters and the lowest in the Central League. His chase rate led NPB hitters in 2016 as of May, decreasing from 24.9% to 17.6% since 2014.

=== Base running ===
In 2015, he recorded an 89.5% stolen base success rate, and topped the NPB in BsR (total contribution to runs scored from stolen bases and base running), with high contributions to runs scored from both stolen bases and base running. According to Tsuyoshi Ueda, who played with him until the 2020 season, Yamada finds success in base-stealing because of his aggressiveness and his ability to read the opposing pitcher and catcher. According to the pitchers he has played against, he surprises by having a small lead when he gets on base and not giving a sense of wanting to steal a base, but running on the first pitch. He has also drawn attention for his sliding technique at home plate, which he has specifically worked on in practice.

=== Fielding ===
Yamada initially played shortstop during his tenure in Yakult's Eastern League farm team, before becoming the regular second baseman on the main roster. Although he is primarily a second baseman, he has also played first base and third base for Samurai Japan due to conflicts with other position players.

According to a veteran scout for another team, those scouting Yamada had no problems with his hitting or base running, but his defense was bad enough that he was considered a second- or third-round pick. However, since entering NPB, his fielding ability, especially his range, has been praised by the American media. Up to the start of the 2013 season, he struggled with throwing balls from the shortstop position, but after starting to play primarily second base after his call-up in May, his defense improved considerably. In his 2015 MVP season, he was second among Central League second basemen with a .989 fielding percentage and posted a 17.6 ultimate zone rating, which compares fielders to the league average. He has never won a Gold Glove Award, which he has described as one of his most important goals.

== Career highlights ==
=== Statistical titles ===
Category	Date(s)
Home runs	2015
Stolen bases	2015, 2016, 2018
On-base percentage	2015
Hits	2014

=== Awards/honors received ===
Award/honor	Date(s)
Most Valuable Player	2015
Best Nine Award	2014-2016, 2018, 2019, 2021
Central League Special Recognition Award	2015, 2018
Commissioner's Special Recognition Award	2016
Central League Interleague Play Nippon Life Award	2014
Monthly MVP	2014 (August), 2015 (July–September), 2016 (June), 2018 (July)
All-Star Game Fighting Spirit Award	2014
Home Run Derby Champion	2015
Japan Series Fighting Spirit Award	2015
Monthly Sayonara Award	2018 (June), 2021 (October–November)
Hochi Pro Sports Award	2015
Tsubame Hero of the Year Award	2014-2016
