= Tomohito =

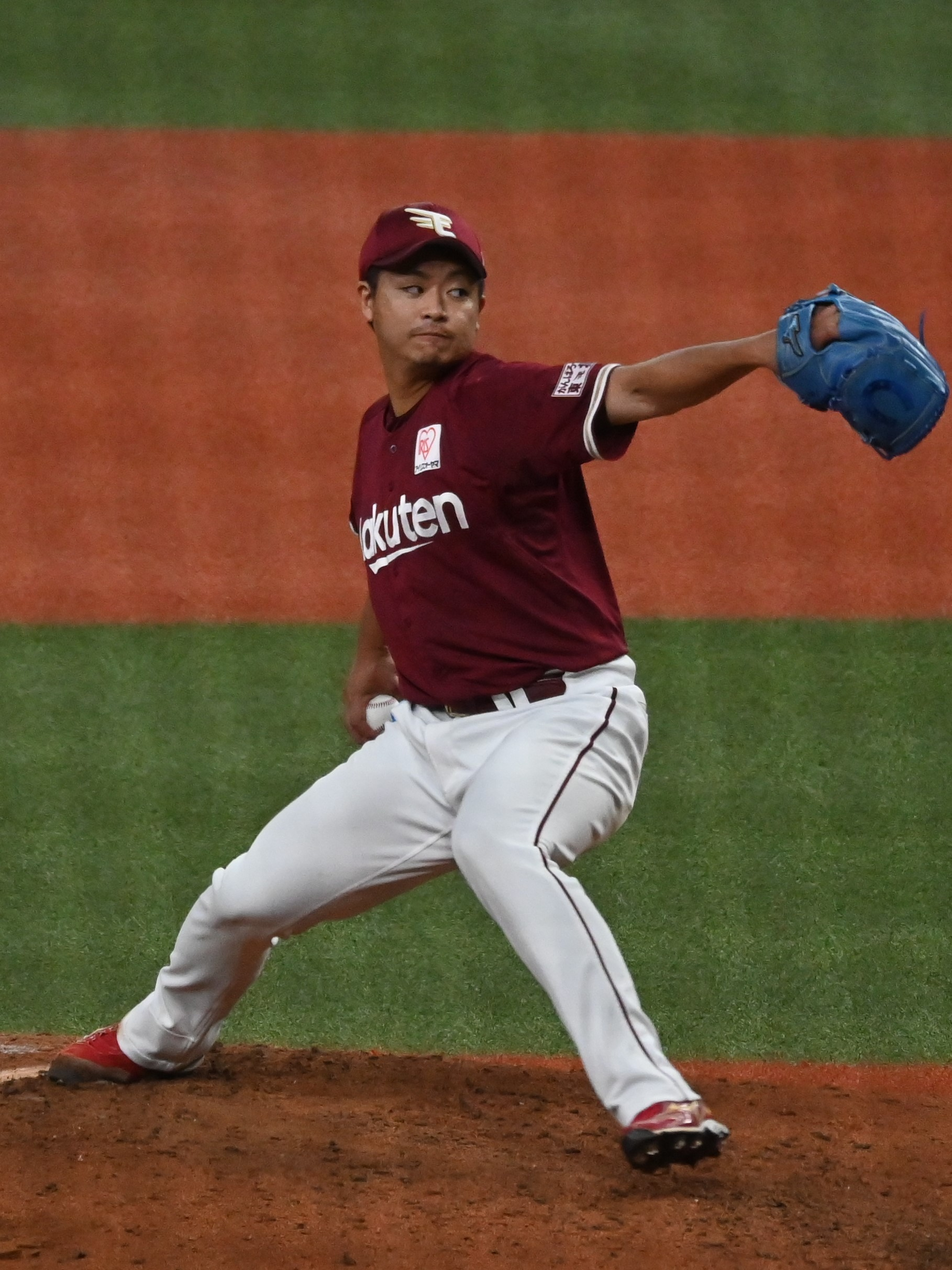
- Tomohito Sakai, Japanese baseball player
- Pronunciation: tomoçito (IPA)
- Gender: Male

Origin
- Origin: Japanese
- Meaning: Different meanings depending on the kanji used

Tomohito is a masculine Japanese given name.

== Written forms ==
Tomohito can be written using different combinations of kanji characters. Some examples:

- 友仁, "friend, humanity"
- 友人, "friend, person"
- 知仁, "know, humanity"
- 知人, "know, person"
- 智仁, "intellect, humanity"
- 智人, "intellect, person"
- 共仁, "together, humanity"
- 共人, "together, person"
- 朋仁, "companion, humanity"
- 朋人, "companion, person"
- 朝仁, "morning/dynasty, humanity"
- 朝人, "morning/dynasty, person"

The name can also be written in hiragana ともひと or katakana トモヒト.

== Notable people with the name ==
- Tomohito (知仁; 1495–1557), Emperor of Japan
- Tomohito Ito (伊藤 智仁; born 1970), Japanese baseball player
- Tomohito Nishiura (西浦 智仁; born 1973), Japanese video game composer
- Tomohito Sakai (酒居 知史; born 1993), Japanese baseball player
- Tomohito Shinnō (親王 寛仁; 1948–2012), Japanese prince
- Tomohito Shugyo (修行 智仁; born 1984), Japanese footballer
- Tomohito Yoneno (米野 智人; born 1982), Japanese baseball player
