= Tomohito Yoneno =

Japanese baseball player (born 1982)

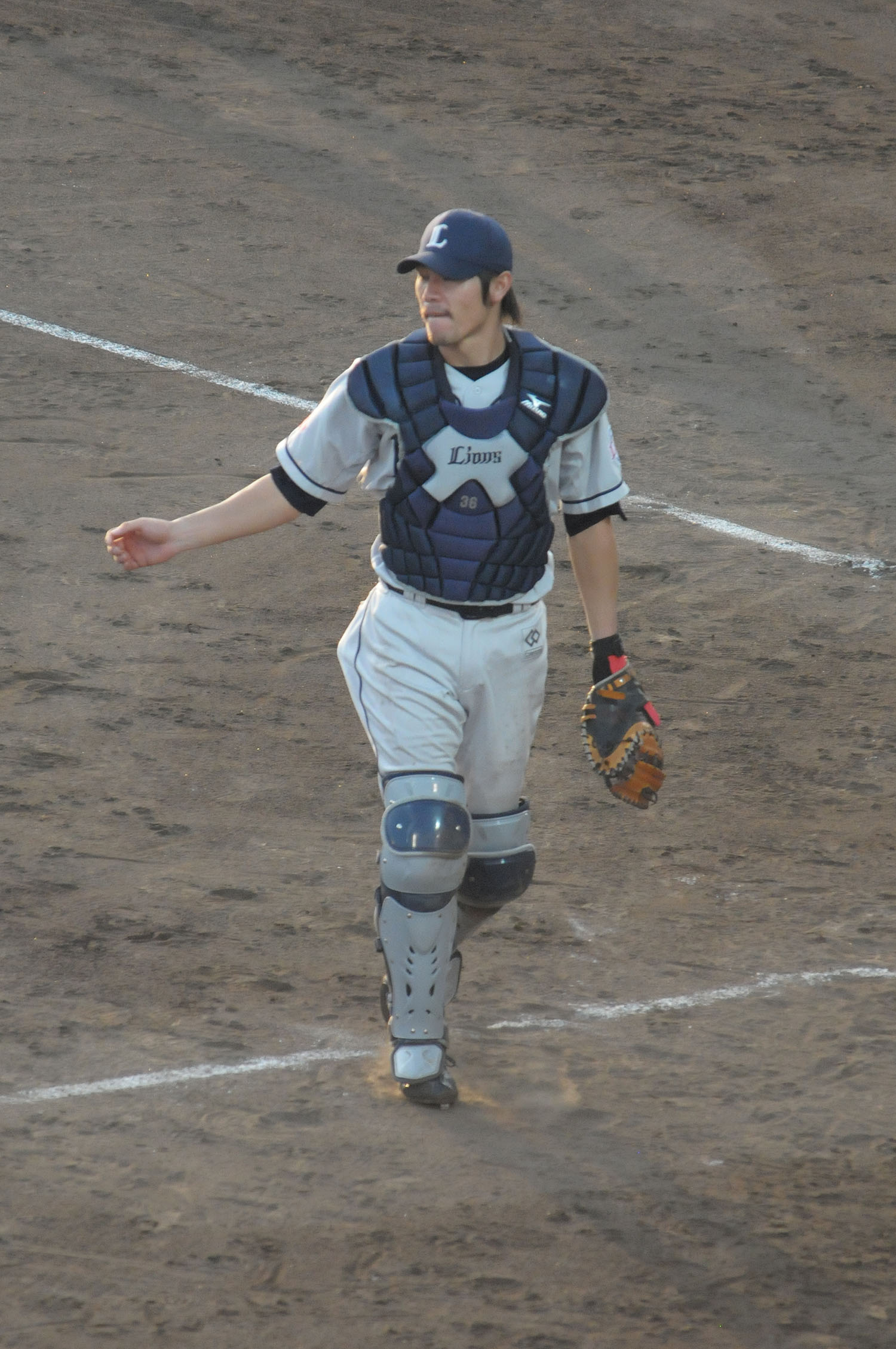
- Yoneno with the Saitama Seibu Lions
- Outfielder/Catcher/Coach
- Born: January 21, 1982 (age 43)
- Bats: Right Throws: Right

NPB debut
- September 7, 2001, for the Yakult Swallows

NPB statistics (through 2016 season)
- Batting average: .206
- Home runs: 13
- RBI: 64

Teams
- As player: Yakult Swallows/Tokyo Yakult Swallows (2000–2010); Saitama Seibu Lions (2010–2015); Hokkaido Nippon-Ham Fighters (2016); As coach: Hokkaido Nippon-Ham Fighters (2016)

Tomohito Yoneno (米野 智人, born January 21, 1982, in Sapporo) is a Japanese professional baseball catcher for the Hokkaido Nippon-Ham Fighters in Japan's Nippon Professional Baseball.
