= Shigeki Ushida =

Japanese baseball player and coach

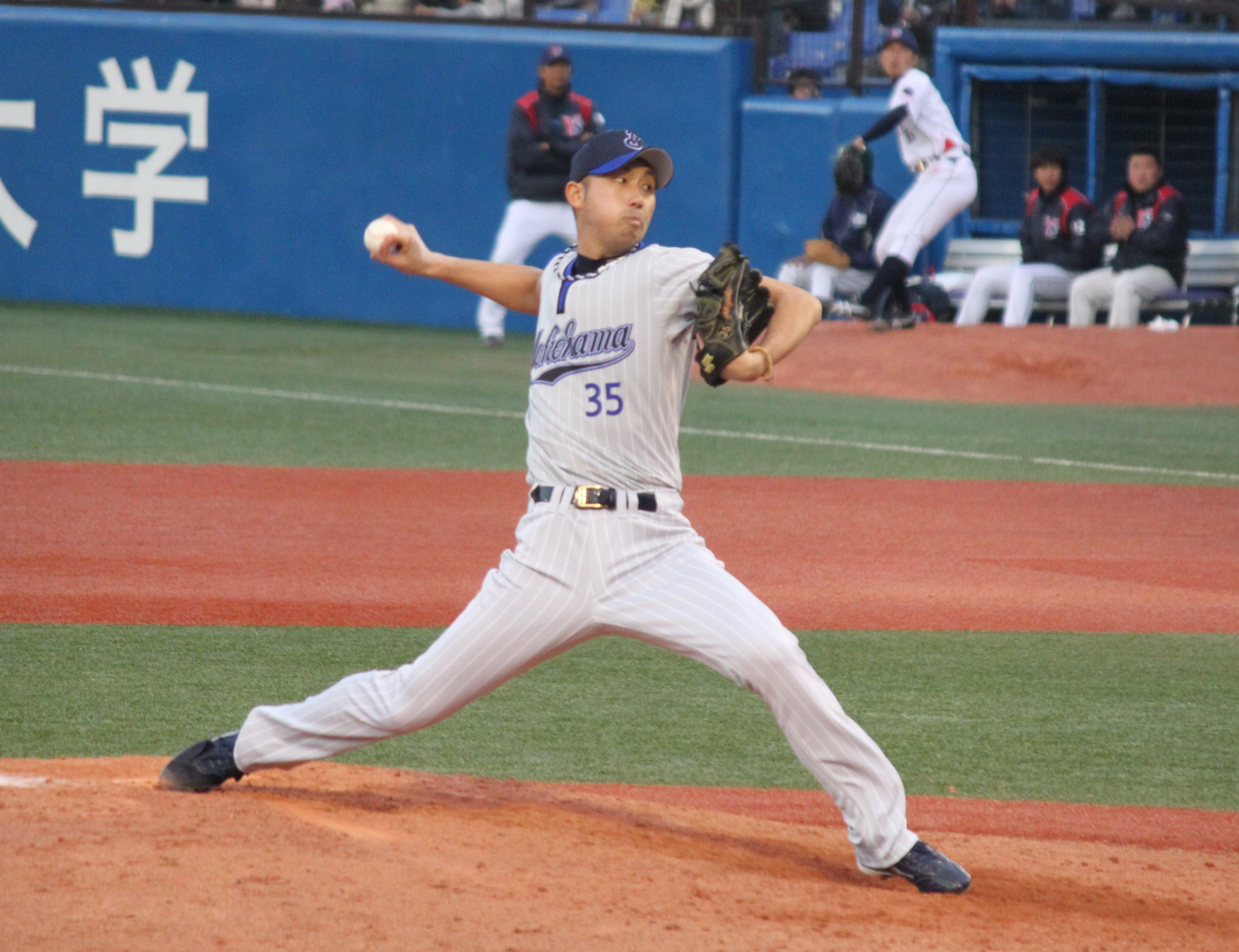
- Pitcher / Coach
- Born: December 6, 1981; Komatsushima, Tokushima, Japan
- Batted: Right Threw: Right

NPB debut
- July 28, 2004, for the Yokohama BayStars

Last appearance
- June 27, 2013, for the Yokohama DeNA BayStars

NPB statistics (through 2013)
- Win–loss record: 9-7
- Earned Run Average: 3.24
- Strikeouts: 277
- Saves: 0

Teams
- As player: Yokohama BayStars / Yokohama DeNA BayStars (2004–2013); As coach: Tokushima Indigo Socks (2015–2016); Yokohama DeNA BayStars (2020–2021)

Shigeki Ushida (牛田 成樹, Ushida Shigeki; born July 7, 1972 in Komatsushima, Tokushima, Japan) is a Japanese former Nippon Professional Baseball pitcher.
