= 2015 Central League Climax Series =

First stage
Team (Wins)		Manager	Season
Yomiuri Giants (2)		Tatsunori Hara	75–67–1 (.528), 1.5 GB
Hanshin Tigers (1)		Yutaka Wada	70–71–2 (.496), 6 GB
- Dates: October 10–12

Final stage
Team (Wins)		Manager	Season
Tokyo Yakult Swallows (4)		Mitsuru Manaka	76–65–2 (.539), 1.5 GA
Yomiuri Giants (1)		Tatsunori Hara	75–67–1 (.528), 1.5 GB
- Dates: October 14–17
- MVP: Shingo Kawabata (Yakult)

The 2015 Central League Climax Series (CLCS) was a post-season playoff consisting of two consecutive series that determined who would represent the Central League in the Japan Series. The First Stage was a best-of-three series and the Final Stage was a best-of-six with the top seed being awarded a one-win advantage. The winner of the series advanced to the 2015 Japan Series, where they competed against the 2015 Pacific League Climax Series winner. The top three regular-season finishers played in the two series. The CLCS began with the first game of the First Stage on October 10 and ended with the final game of the Final Stage on October 17.

== First stage ==
=== Summary ===
Yomiuri Giants won the series, 2–1.

Game	Date	Score	Location	Time	Attendance
1	October 10	Hanshin Tigers – 2, Yomiuri Giants – 3 (10)	Tokyo Dome	3:40	45,298
2	October 11	Hanshin Tigers – 4, Yomiuri Giants – 2	Tokyo Dome	3:48	46,698
3	October 12	Hanshin Tigers – 1, Yomiuri Giants – 3	Tokyo Dome	2:48	46,067

=== Game 1 ===
Saturday, October 10, 2015, 2:00 pm (JST) at Tokyo Dome in Bunkyō, Tokyo
Team	1	2	3	4	5	6	7	8	9	10	R	H	E
Hanshin	0	0	0	0	0	0	2	0	0	0	2	8	1
Yomiuri	0	0	0	0	1	1	0	0	0	1X	3	9	0
WP: Hirokazu Sawamura (1–0) LP: Yuya Ando (0–1); Attendance: 45,298

=== Game 2 ===
Sunday, October 11, 2015, 2:00 pm (JST) at Tokyo Dome in Bunkyō, Tokyo
Team	1	2	3	4	5	6	7	8	9	R	H	E
Hanshin	3	0	0	1	0	0	0	0	0	4	11	0
Yomiuri	1	0	0	0	0	0	1	0	0	2	11	1
WP: Randy Messenger (1–0) LP: Tomoyuki Sugano (0–1) Sv: Shinobu Fukuhara (1); Home runs: HAN: Mauro Gómez (1), Matt Murton (1); YOM: Leslie Anderson (1); Attendance: 46,698

=== Game 3 ===
Monday, October 12, 2015, 2:00 pm (JST) at Tokyo Dome in Bunkyō, Tokyo
Team	1	2	3	4	5	6	7	8	9	R	H	E
Hanshin	0	0	0	0	0	0	1	0	0	1	5	0
Yomiuri	1	0	0	0	0	2	0	0	X	3	6	0
WP: Aaron Poreda (1–0) LP: Atsushi Nomi (0–1) Sv: Hirokazu Sawamura (1); Home runs: HAN: Kosuke Fukudome (1); YOM: None; Attendance: 46,067

== Final stage ==
=== Summary ===
Tokyo Yakult Swallows won the series, 4–1*.

Game	Date	Score	Location	Time	Attendance
1	October 14	Yomiuri Giants – 4, Tokyo Yakult Swallows – 1	Meiji Jingu Stadium	3:38	31,502
2	October 15	Yomiuri Giants – 0, Tokyo Yakult Swallows – 4	Meiji Jingu Stadium	2:51	31,274
3	October 16	Yomiuri Giants – 0, Tokyo Yakult Swallows – 2	Meiji Jingu Stadium	3:27	33,102
4	October 17	Yomiuri Giants – 2, Tokyo Yakult Swallows – 3	Meiji Jingu Stadium	2:58	34,038

* The Central League regular season champion is given a one-game advantage in the Final Stage.
