= Yuji Kaneko =

Japanese baseball player (born 1990)

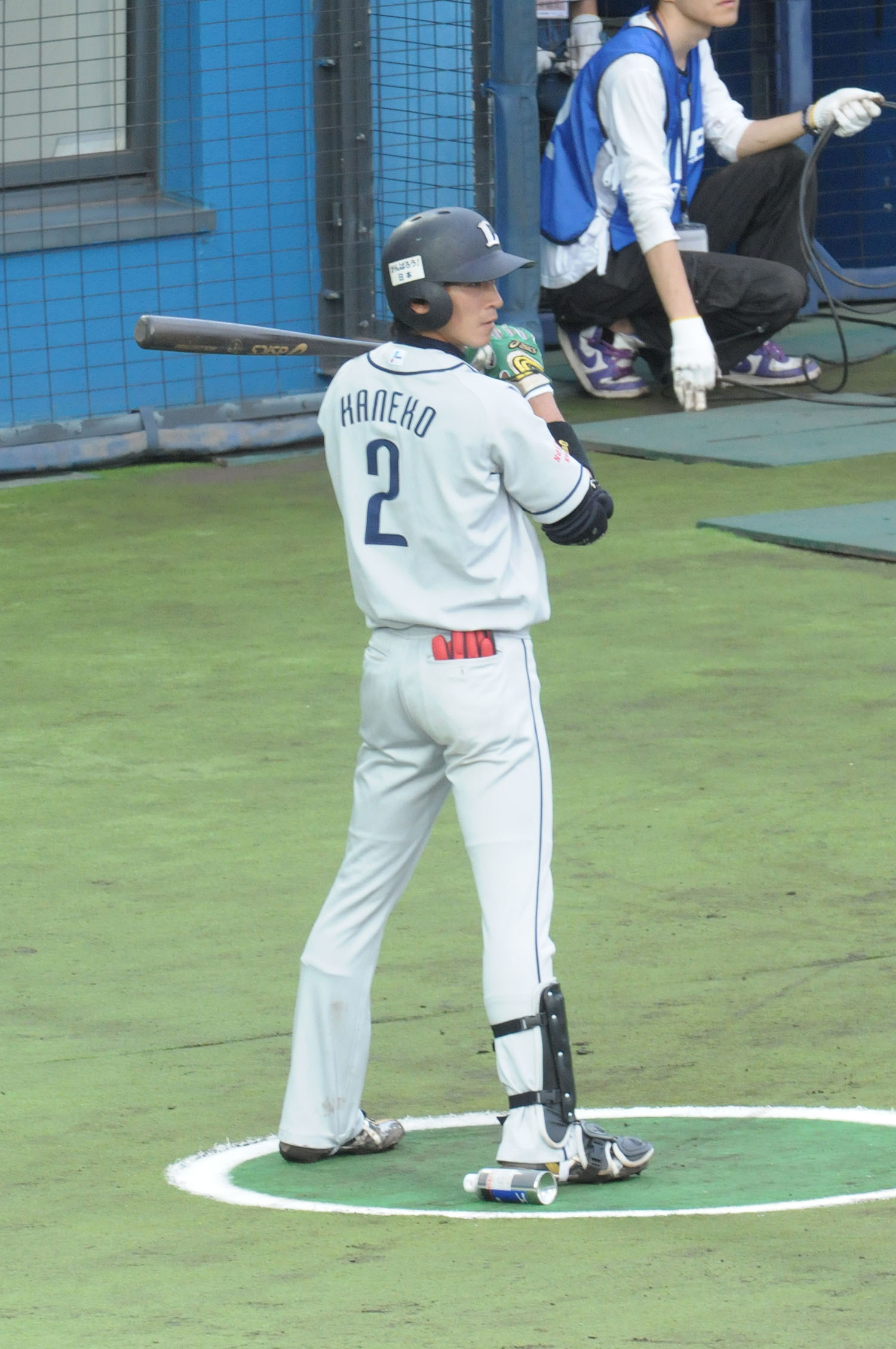
- Kaneko with the Saitama Seibu Lions
- Infielder/Outfielder
- Born: April 24, 1990 (age 35)
- Batted: Both Threw: Right

NPB debut
- March 29, 2013, for the Saitama Seibu Lions

Last NPB appearance
- September 15, 2024, for the Saitama Seibu Lions

NPB statistics
- Batting average: .241
- Hits: 729
- Home runs: 21
- RBI: 223
- Stolen bases: 225
- Stats at Baseball Reference

Teams
- Saitama Seibu Lions (2013–2024)

Career highlights and awards
- 2× Pacific League stolen base champion (2016, 2019)

Yuji Kaneko (金子 侑司, Kaneko Yūji; born April 24, 1990 in Kyoto Prefecture) is a former Japanese professional baseball infielder.
