= 2015 Nippon Professional Baseball season =

2015 NPB season
- League: Nippon Professional Baseball
- Sport: Baseball
- Duration: March 27 – October 29

Central League pennant
- League champions: Tokyo Yakult Swallows
- Runners-up: Yomiuri Giants
- Season MVP: Tetsuto Yamada (Yakult)

Pacific League pennant
- League champions: Fukuoka SoftBank Hawks
- Runners-up: Hokkaido Nippon-Ham Fighters
- Season MVP: Yuki Yanagita (SoftBank)

Climax Series
- CL champions: Tokyo Yakult Swallows
- CL runners-up: Yomiuri Giants
- PL champions: Fukuoka SoftBank Hawks
- PL runners-up: Chiba Lotte Marines

Japan Series
- Venue: Fukuoka Yafuoku! Dome, Chūō-ku, Fukuoka; Meiji Jingu Stadium, Shinjuku, Tokyo
- Champions: Fukuoka SoftBank Hawks
- Runners-up: Tokyo Yakult Swallows
- Finals MVP: Dae-ho Lee (SoftBank)

NPB seasons
- ← 2014 2016 →

The 2015 Nippon Professional Baseball season was the 66th season since the NPB was reorganized in 1950. In the Central League, the Yakult Swallows claimed the pennant and defeated the Yomiuri Giants in the final stage of the Climax Series. In the Pacific League, the Fukuoka SoftBank Hawks won the penant and defeated the Chiba Lotte Marines in the final stage of the Climax Series.

== Incidents ==
A gambling scandal involving members of the Yomiuri Giants was reported in October. Pitchers Satoshi Fukuda, Shoki Kasahara, and Ryuya Matsumoto were found to have bet on both NPB games and Major League Baseball games, as well as high school baseball.

== Regular season standings ==
Central League regular season standings
Team	G	W	L	T	Pct.	GB
Tokyo Yakult Swallows	143	76	65	2	.539	–
Yomiuri Giants	143	75	67	1	.528	1.5
Hanshin Tigers	143	70	71	2	.496	6.0
Hiroshima Toyo Carp	143	69	71	3	.493	6.5
Chunichi Dragons	143	62	77	4	.446	13.0
Yokohama DeNA BayStars	143	62	80	1	.437	14.5

Pacific League regular season standings
Team	G	W	L	T	Pct.	GB
Fukuoka SoftBank Hawks	143	90	49	4	.647	–
Hokkaido Nippon-Ham Fighters	143	79	62	2	.560	12.0
Chiba Lotte Marines	143	73	69	1	.511	19.0
Saitama Seibu Lions	143	69	69	5	.500	20.5
Orix Buffaloes	143	61	80	2	.433	30.0
Tohoku Rakuten Golden Eagles	143	57	83	3	.410	33.0

== Climax Series ==
Note: In each league's stepladder playoff system (Climax Series), all games in that series are held at the higher seed's home stadium. The team with the higher regular-season standing also advanced if the round ended in a tie.

First stage
Central League
2	Yomiuri Giants	2
3	Hanshin Tigers	1
Pacific League
2	Hokkaido Nippon-Ham Fighters	1
3	Chiba Lotte Marines	2

Final stage
1	Tokyo Yakult Swallows	4
2	Yomiuri Giants	1
1	Fukuoka SoftBank Hawks	4
3	Chiba Lotte Marines	0

Japan Series
CL1	Tokyo Yakult Swallows	1
PL1	Fukuoka SoftBank Hawks	4

=== First stage ===
The regular season league champions, the Fukuoka SoftBank Hawks (PL) and the Tokyo Yakult Swallows (CL), received byes to the championship round.

==== Central League ====
Yomiuri Giants (2) vs. Hanshin Tigers (1)

Game	Date	Score	Location	Time	Attendance
1	October 10	Hanshin Tigers – 2, Yomiuri Giants – 3	Tokyo Dome	3:40	45,298
2	October 11	Hanshin Tigers – 4, Yomiuri Giants – 2	Tokyo Dome	3:48	46,698
3	October 12	Hanshin Tigers – 1, Yomiuri Giants – 3	Tokyo Dome	2:48	46,067

==== Pacific League ====
Chiba Lotte Marines (2) vs. Hokkaido Nippon-Ham Fighters (1)

Game	Date	Score	Location	Time	Attendance
1	October 10	Chiba Lotte Marines – 9, Hokkaido Nippon-Ham Fighters – 3	Sapporo Dome	3:28	41,138
2	October 11	Chiba Lotte Marines – 2, Hokkaido Nippon-Ham Fighters – 4	Sapporo Dome	3:06	41,138
3	October 12	Chiba Lotte Marines – 2, Hokkaido Nippon-Ham Fighters – 1	Sapporo Dome	3:42	32,201

=== Final stage ===
The regular season league champions, the Fukuoka SoftBank Hawks (PL) and the Tokyo Yakult Swallows (CL), received a one-game advantage.

==== Central League ====
Yomiuri Giants (1) vs. Tokyo Yakult Swallows (4)

Game	Date	Score	Location	Time	Attendance
1	October 14	Yomiuri Giants – 4, Tokyo Yakult Swallows– 1	Meiji Jingu Stadium	3:38	31,502
2	October 15	Yomiuri Giants – 0, Tokyo Yakult Swallows– 4	Meiji Jingu Stadium	2:51	31,274
3	October 16	Yomiuri Giants – 0, Tokyo Yakult Swallows– 2	Meiji Jingu Stadium	3:27	33,102
4	October 17	Yomiuri Giants – 2, Tokyo Yakult Swallows– 3	Meiji Jingu Stadium	2:58	34,038

==== Pacific League ====
Chiba Lotte Marines (0) vs. Fukuoka SoftBank Hawks (4)

Game	Date	Score	Location	Time	Attendance
1	October 14	Chiba Lotte Marines – 2, Fukuoka SoftBank Hawks – 3 (10 innings)	Fukuoka Dome	3:43	37,360
2	October 15	Chiba Lotte Marines – 1, Fukuoka SoftBank Hawks – 6	Fukuoka Dome	2:59	37,603
3	October 16	Chiba Lotte Marines – 1, Fukuoka SoftBank Hawks – 3	Fukuoka Dome	2:53	37,235

== Japan Series ==
CL Tokyo Yakult Swallows (1) vs. PL Fukuoka SoftBank Hawks (4)

Game	Date	Score	Location	Time	Attendance
1	October 24	Tokyo Yakult Swallows – 2, Fukuoka SoftBank Hawks – 4	Fukuoka Dome	3:04	35,732
2	October 25	Tokyo Yakult Swallows – 0, Fukuoka SoftBank Hawks – 4	Fukuoka Dome	3:35	35,764
3	October 27	Fukuoka SoftBank Hawks – 4, Tokyo Yakult Swallows – 8	Meiji Jingu Stadium	3:38	31,037
4	October 28	Fukuoka SoftBank Hawks – 6, Tokyo Yakult Swallows – 4	Meiji Jingu Stadium	4:06	31,288
5	October 29	Fukuoka SoftBank Hawks – 5, Tokyo Yakult Swallows – 0	Meiji Jingu Stadium	3:36	31,239

== League leaders ==
=== Central League ===
Batting leaders
Stat	Player	Team	Total
Batting average	Shingo Kawabata	Tokyo Yakult Swallows	.336
Home runs	Tetsuto Yamada	Tokyo Yakult Swallows	38
Runs batted in	Kazuhiro Hatakeyama	Tokyo Yakult Swallows	105
Runs	Tetsuto Yamada	Tokyo Yakult Swallows	119
Hits	Shingo Kawabata	Tokyo Yakult Swallows	195
Stolen bases	Tetsuto Yamada	Tokyo Yakult Swallows	34

Pitching leaders
Stat	Player	Team	Total
Wins	Kenta Maeda	Hiroshima Carp	15
Losses	Atsushi Nomi	Hanshin Tigers	13
Earned run average	Kris Johnson	Hiroshima Carp	1.85
Strikeouts	Shintaro Fujinami	Hanshin Tigers	221
Innings pitched	Yudai Ono	Chunichi Dragons	207.1
Saves	Tony Barnette	Tokyo Yakult Swallows	41
Saves	Oh Seung-hwan	Hanshin Tigers	41

=== Pacific League ===
Batting leaders
Stat	Player	Team	Total
Batting average	Yuki Yanagita	Fukuoka SoftBank Hawks	.363
Home runs	Takeya Nakamura	Saitama Seibu Lions	37
Runs batted in	Takeya Nakamura	Saitama Seibu Lions	124
Runs	Yuki Yanagita	Fukuoka SoftBank Hawks	110
Hits	Shogo Akiyama	Saitama Seibu Lions	216
Stolen bases	Takuya Nakashima	Hokkaido Nippon-Ham Fighters	34

Pitching leaders
Stat	Player	Team	Total
Wins	Shohei Ohtani	Hokkaido Nippon-Ham Fighters	15
Losses	Ayumu Ishikawa	Chiba Lotte Marines	12
Earned run average	Shohei Ohtani	Hokkaido Nippon-Ham Fighters	2.24
Strikeouts	Takahiro Norimoto	Tohoku Rakuten Golden Eagles	215
Innings pitched	Takahiro Norimoto	Tohoku Rakuten Golden Eagles	194.2
Saves	Dennis Sarfate	Fukuoka SoftBank Hawks	41

== See also ==
- 2015 Korea Professional Baseball season
- 2015 Major League Baseball season
