= Ryuya Matsumoto =

Japanese baseball player (born 1993)

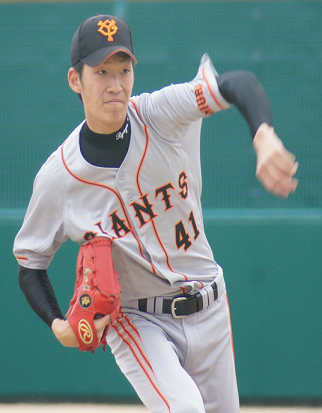
- Pitcher
- Born: April 29, 1993 (age 33); Takamatsu, Kagawa, Japan
- Bats: Left Throws: Left
- Stats at Baseball Reference

Teams
- Yomiuri Giants (2012–2015)

Ryuya Matsumoto (松本 竜也, Matsumoto Ryūya) (born April 29, 1993) is a Japanese professional baseball pitcher. He played in Nippon Professional Baseball (NPB) for the Yomiuri Giants. In November 2015 he was one of three Giants players handed a penalty of indefinite disqualification by the league for betting on professional baseball games.

== Early life ==
Matsumoto was born in Takamatsu, Kagawa on 29 April 1993. A natural right hander, his father Yasuki trained him to throw with his left hand from two years of age. When growing up his ideal person was Gorō Shigeno, the main character from the baseball-themed comic Major; like Matsumoto, Shigeno was a natural right-hander that pitched left-handed.

Matsumoto attended school in Takamatsu, including Eimei High School. He was the school baseball team's ace pitcher in his final year, leading the school to victory in the Kagawa Prefecture tournament and earning a berth in the 2011 national high school championships. In the first round match against Okinawa Prefecture's Itoman High School, Matsumoto threw 11 strikeouts in his team's 4–1 victory. In the second round match against Akita Prefecture's Noshiro Shoyo High School, Matsumoto threw nine strikeouts and allowed only one earned run, but his team was unable to score in the 0–2 loss. Matsumoto's powerful performance, along with being the tallest player in the tournament at 193 cm, earned him the nickname "Eimei's Randy Johnson". He was the first round pick by the Yomiuri Giants in the 2011 Nippon Professional Baseball draft.

== Professional career ==
Matsumoto entered professional baseball as the tallest ever Japanese-born left-handed pitcher. In 2012, his first season as a professional, he made 9 appearances for the Giants' farm team in the Eastern League, finishing with a 2–2 win–loss record and a 4.50 ERA. In 2013 Matsumoto was unable to play as he spent the year overcoming injuries to his shoulder. In 2014, he pitched in 16 games for the farm team, earning a 3–10 win–loss record and an ERA of 5.13. In 2015, he made 9 appearances for the farm team, finishing with a 1–1 record and a 4.50 ERA.

== Gambling scandal ==
In October, 2015, Matsumoto was named as a result of an investigation conducted by the Giants into illegal betting on professional and high school baseball games by its players. On 9 November 2015, the Giants organization terminated Matsumoto's contract, along with fellow pitchers Satoshi Fukuda and Shoki Kasahara. On 10 November the NPB league commissioner penalized the three players with an indefinite suspension from all World Baseball Softball Confederation leagues. Under league rules, Matsumoto will be able to apply for readmission to any WBSC sanctioned league after five years if he satisfies the commissioner that he is remorseful for his actions. WBSC recognised leagues include MLB (North America), KBO (Korea), CPBL (Taiwan), HH (NED), DHB (Spain), and Serie A Baseball (Italy). The players avoided permanent disqualification because the investigation found no evidence that they were involved in fixing matches.

The Giants were also fined ¥10 million over the incident and the team's representative at the NPB, Atsushi Harasawa, resigned to take responsibility.
