= Shingo Kawabata (baseball) =

Japanese baseball player (born 1987)

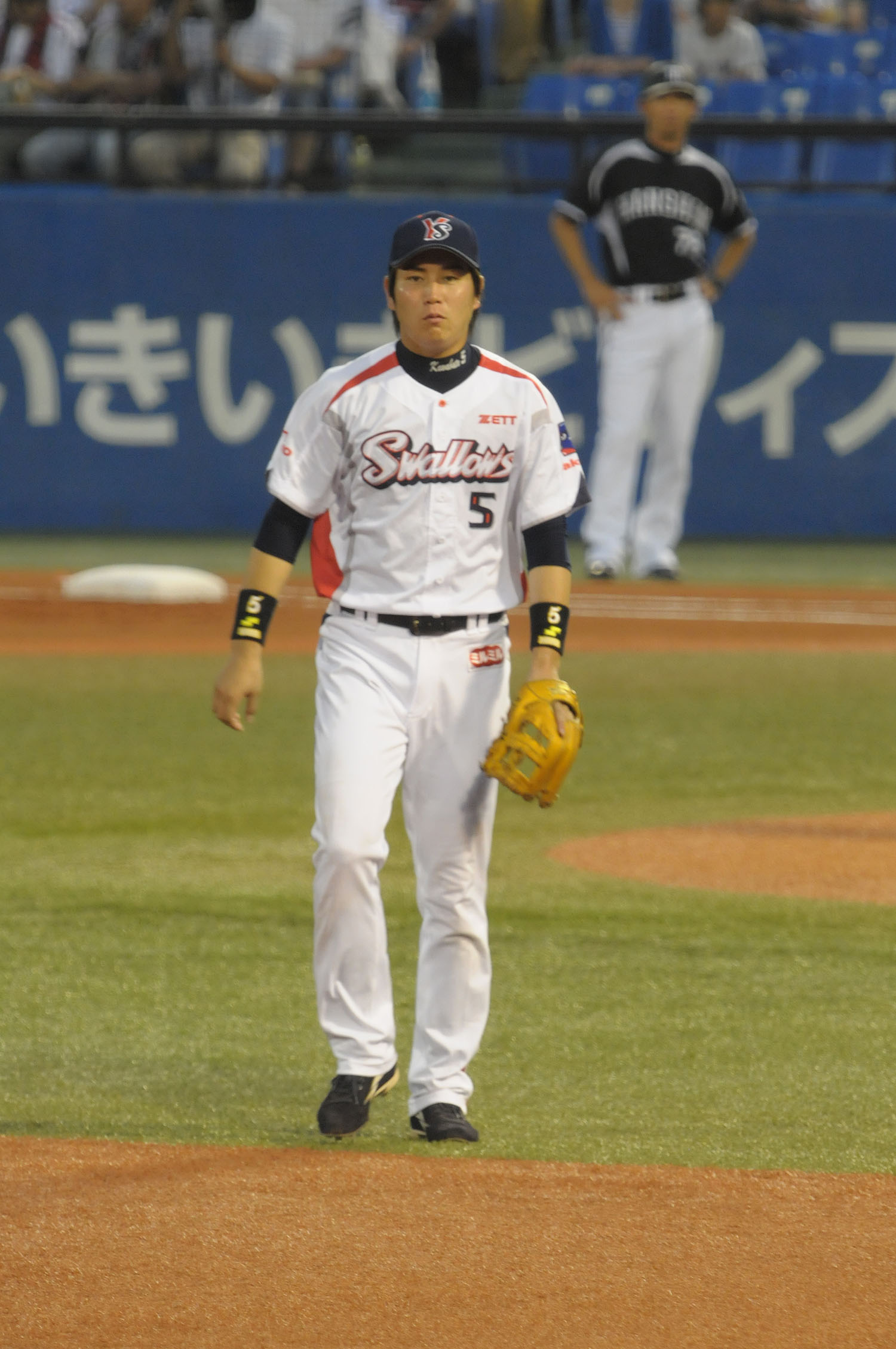
- Kawabata with the Tokyo Yakult Swallows

Tokyo Yakult Swallows – No. 73
- Infielder / Coach
- Born: October 16, 1987 (age 38); Kaizuka, Osaka Prefecture, Japan
- Batted: Left Threw: Right

NPB debut
- October 9, 2006, for the Tokyo Yakult Swallows

Last NPB appearance
- September 28, 2025, for the Tokyo Yakult Swallows

NPB statistics
- Batting average: .293
- Hits: 1,100
- Home runs: 40
- Runs batted in: 409
- Stats at Baseball Reference

Teams
- As player: Tokyo Yakult Swallows (2006–2025); As coach: Tokyo Yakult Swallows (2026–present)

Career highlights and awards
- Japan Series champion (2021); 2015 CLCS MVP; Central League Golden Glove Award (2015); 2× NPB All-Star (2015-2016); Central League Best Nine Award (2015); Central League batting champion (2015); Central League hits champion (2015)
Medals
Men's baseball
Representing Japan
2015 WBSC Premier12
Bronze medal – third place	2015 Tokyo	Team

Shingo Kawabata (川端 慎吾, Kawabata Shingo; born October 16, 1987) is a Japanese former professional baseball infielder. He played in Nippon Professional Baseball (NPB) for the Tokyo Yakult Swallows from 2006 to 2025.

== Career ==
Kawabata won the Central League batting title in 2015 after recording a .336 average.

On September 27, 2025, Kawabata announced that he would be retiring following the conclusion of the season.
