= Satoshi Fukuda =

Japanese baseball player (born 1983)

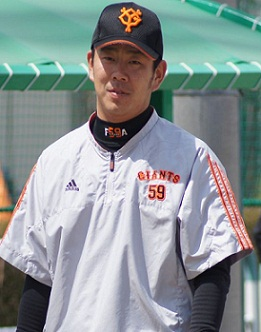
- Pitcher
- Born: September 12, 1983 (age 42); Kishiwada, Osaka, Japan
- Batted: Right Threw: Right

NPB debut
- April 1, 2006, for the Yomiuri Giants

Last NPB appearance
- October 2, 2014, for the Yomiuri Giants

NPB statistics
- Win–loss record: 22–15
- Earned run average: 4.15
- Strikeouts: 205
- Stats at Baseball Reference

Teams
- Yomiuri Giants (2006–2015)

Satoshi Fukuda (福田 聡志, Fukuda Satoshi; born September 12, 1983) is a Japanese former professional baseball pitcher. He played in Nippon Professional Baseball (NPB) for the Yomiuri Giants from 2006 to 2015.

== Baseball career ==
Fukuda debuted for the Yomiuri Giants in 2006, and played for the team until his dismissal in 2015 as the result of a betting scandal.

=== Scandal ===
In October, 2015, Fukuda was named as a result of an investigation conducted by the Giants into illegal betting on professional and high school baseball games by its players.

On 9 November 2015, the Giants organization terminated Fukuda's contract, along with fellow pitchers Shoki Kasahara and Ryuya Matsumoto.

On 10 November the NPB league commissioner penalized the three players with a World Baseball Softball Confederation-wide indefinite disqualification. Under league rules, Fukuda will be able to apply for readmission to any WBSC-sanctioned league after five years if he satisfies the commissioner that he is remorseful for his actions.

The disqualification extends to all leagues recognised by the global governing body of baseball, the World Baseball Softball Confederation. Such recognised leagues include MLB (North America), KBO (Korea), CPBL (Taiwan), HH (NED), DHB (Spain), and Serie A Baseball (Italy). The players avoided permanent disqualification because the investigation found no evidence that they were involved in fixing matches.

The Giants were also fined ¥10 million over the incident and the team's representative at the NPB, Atsushi Harasawa, resigned to take responsibility.
