= Shoki Kasahara =

Japanese baseball player (born 1991)

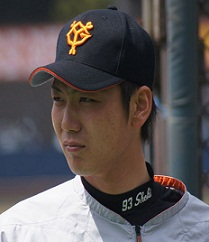
- Pitcher
- Born: January 9, 1991 (age 35); Fukuoka, Japan
- Batted: Right Threw: Right

NPB debut
- April 26, 2012, for the Yomiuri Giants

Last NPB appearance
- August 9, 2015, for the Yomiuri Giants

NPB statistics
- Win–loss record: 7–1
- Earned run average: 4.34
- Strikeouts: 116
- Stats at Baseball Reference

Teams
- Yomiuri Giants (2012–2015)

Shoki Kasahara (笠原 将生, Kasahara Shōki) (born January 9, 1991) is a Japanese former professional baseball pitcher. He played in Nippon Professional Baseball (NPB) for the Yomiuri Giants from 2012 to 2015.

== Personal life ==
His younger brother Taiga is also a professional baseball player currently playing for Fukuoka SoftBank Hawks. His father Eiichi is a former professional baseball player.

== Career ==
In October, 2015, Kasahara was named as a result of an investigation conducted by the Giants into illegal betting on professional and high school baseball games by its players. On 9 November 2015, the Giants organization terminated Kasahara's contract, along with fellow pitchers Satoshi Fukuda and Ryuya Matsumoto. The investigation found that Kasahara introduced the other two players to a graduate school student that facilitated the betting. On 10 November the NPB league commissioner penalized the three players with a World Baseball Softball Confederation-wide suspension, with eligibility for reinstatement after five years if he satisfies the commissioner that he is remorseful for his actions. The disqualification extends to all leagues recognised by the global governing body of baseball, the World Baseball Softball Confederation. Such recognised leagues include MLB (North America), KBO (Korea), CPBL (Taiwan), HH (NED), DHB (Spain), and Serie A Baseball (Italy). The players avoided permanent disqualification because the investigation found no evidence that they were involved in fixing matches.

The Giants were also fined ¥10 million over the incident and the team's representative at the NPB, Atsushi Harasawa, resigned to take responsibility.
