= Tsuyoshi Ueda =

Zainichi Korean baseball player (born 1988)

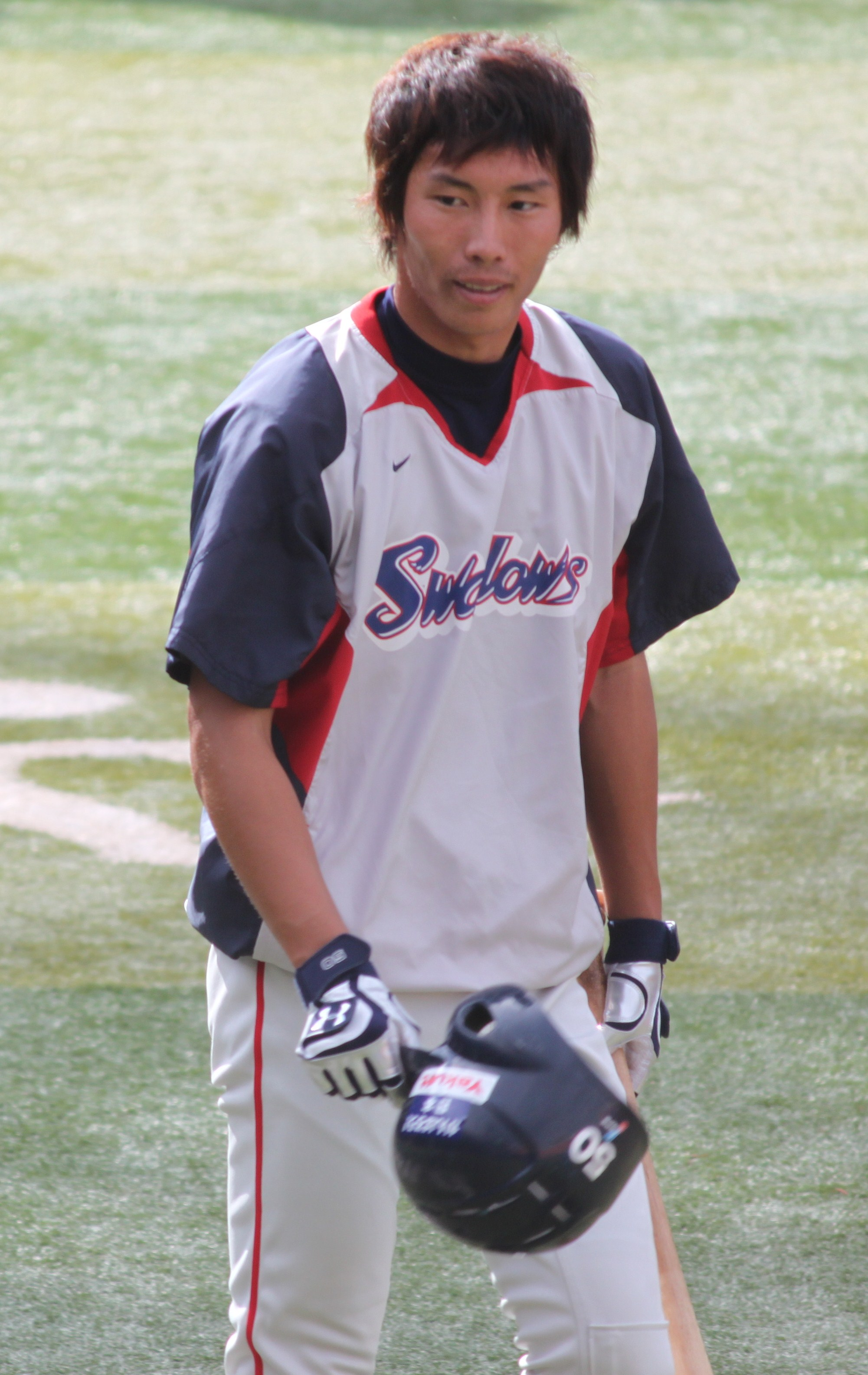
- Outfielder
- Born: October 2, 1988 (age 36); Okayama, Okayama, Japan
- Bats: Left Throws: Right

debut
- July 22, 2009, for the Tokyo Yakult Swallows

Career statistics (through 2020 season)
- Batting average: .236
- Hits: 345
- Runs batted in: 109
- Home runs: 9
- Stolen bases: 75

Teams
- Tokyo Yakult Swallows (2007–2020)

Tsuyoshi Ueda (上田 剛史, Tsuyoshi Ueda, born July 22, 1988 in Okayama, Okayama Prefecture, Japan) is a Zainichi Korean former professional baseball outfielder. An ethnic Korean, his birth name is Hanja: 周剛史.

On December 2, 2020, he become free agent.
