= Mazda Stadium =

Baseball stadium in Minami-ku, Hiroshima, Japan

Coordinates: 34°23′30.9″N 132°29′05.1″E

Mazda Zoom-Zoom Stadium Hiroshima
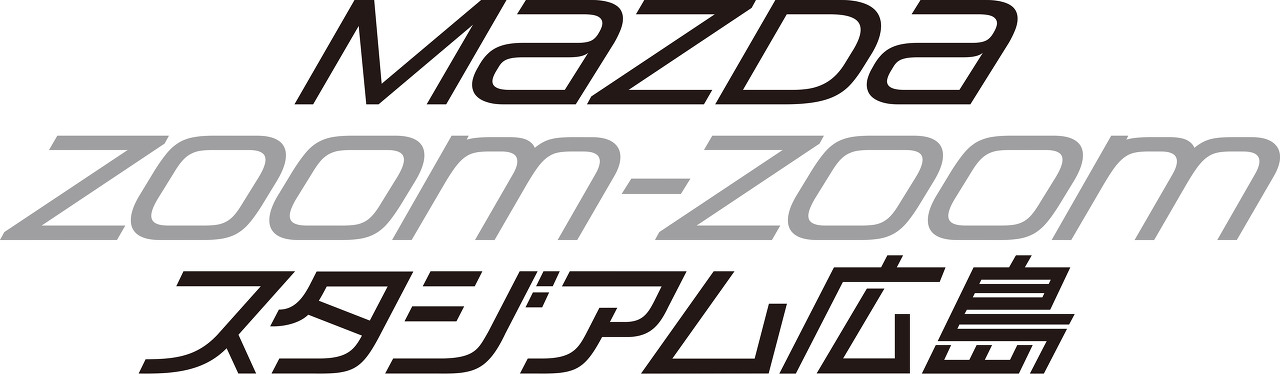

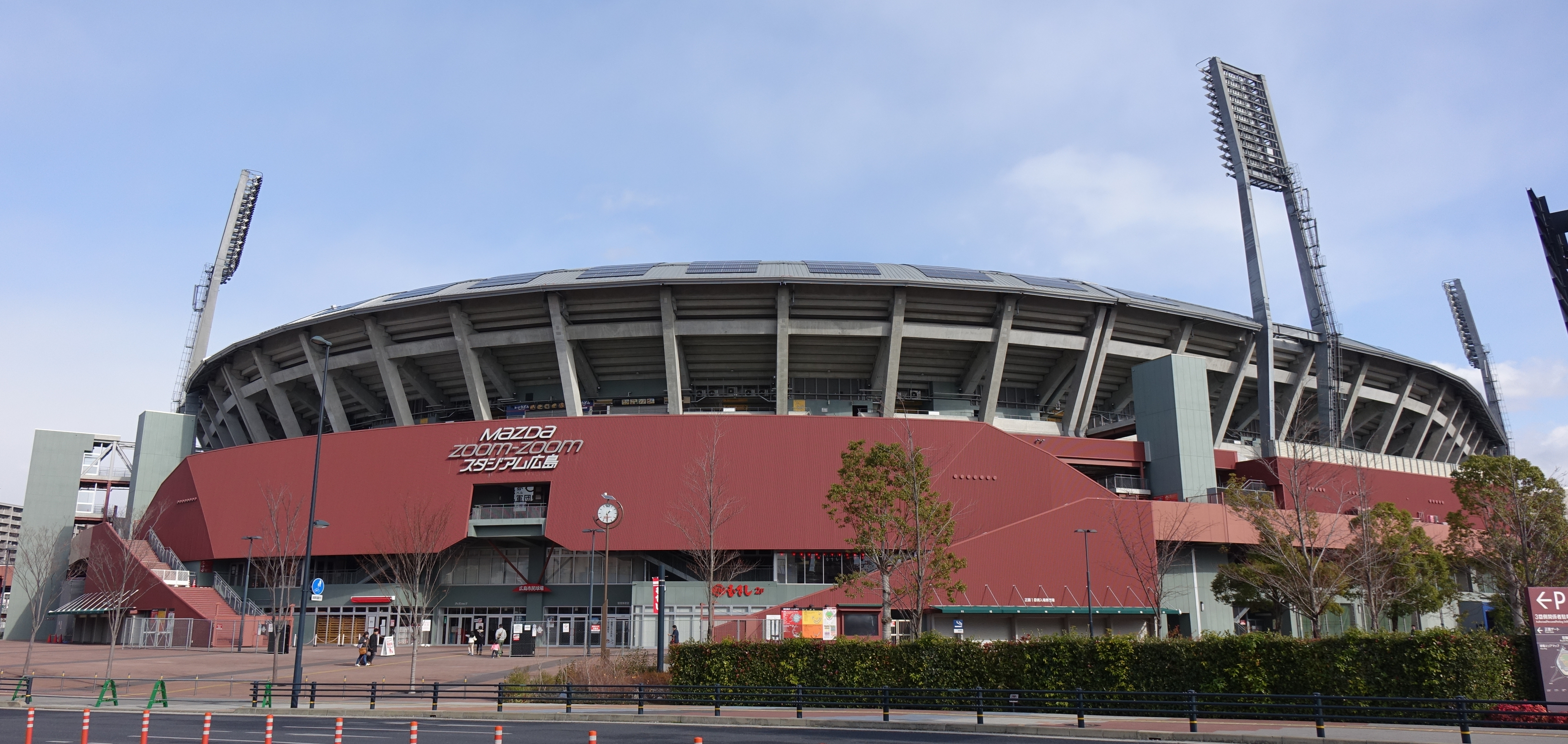
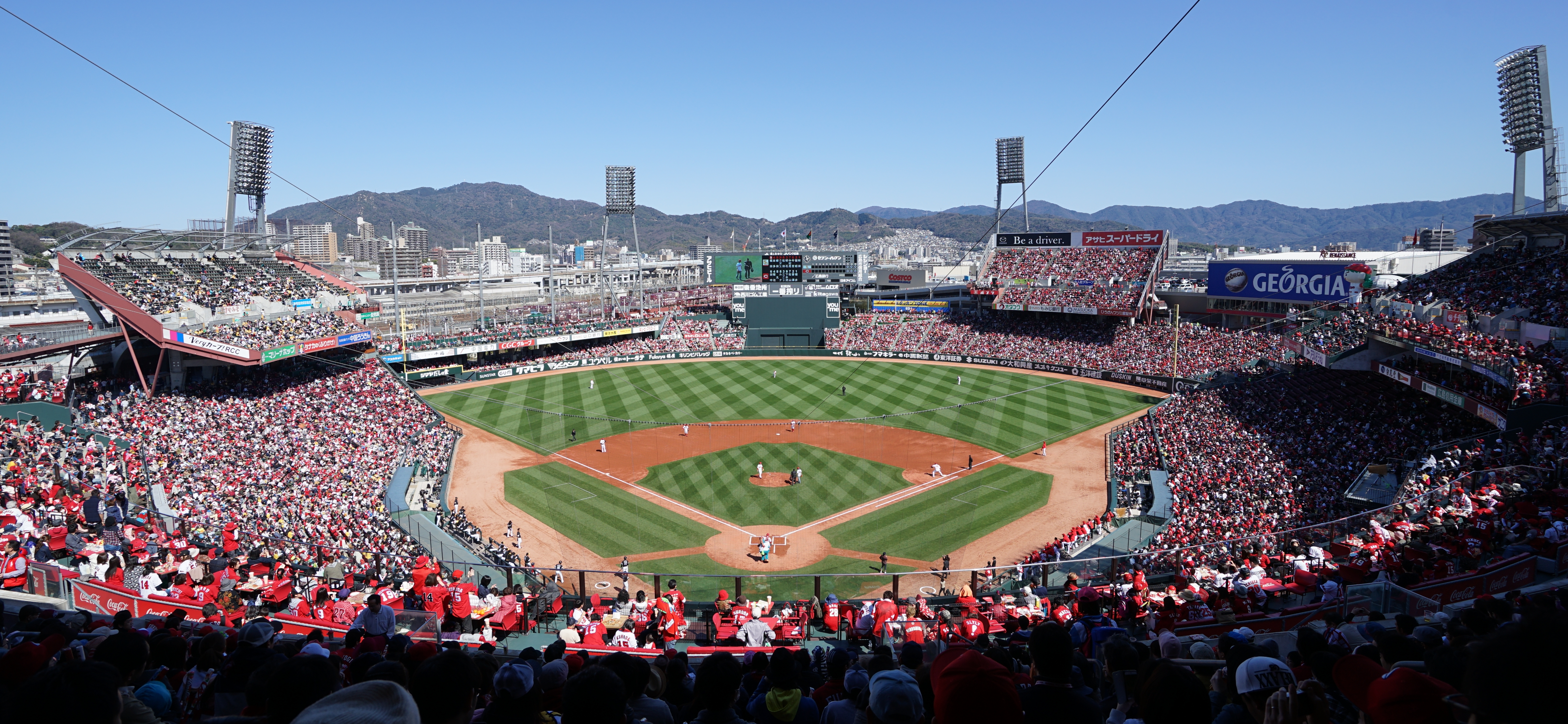
- Interactive map of Mazda Zoom-Zoom Stadium Hiroshima
- Full name: Hiroshima Municipal Stadium
- Location: 2-3-1 Minami-Kaniya, Minami-ku, Hiroshima, Japan
- Owner: Hiroshima City
- Operator: Hiroshima Toyo Carp
- Capacity: 32,000; 300 for wheelchairs Field seats
- Surface: grass
- Field size: Left Field - 101 metres (331 ft); Left-Center - 116 metres (381 ft); Center Field - 122 metres (400 ft); Right-Center - 116 metres (381 ft); Right Field - 100 metres (328 ft)
- Public transit: JR West: Sanyo Shinkansen; R Sanyo Main Line at Hiroshima

Construction
- Opened: April 10, 2009
- Architect: Masuoka Architectural
- Main contractors: Penta-Ocean Construction Co., Ltd. Masuoka Architectural Constructors Inc

Tenant
- Hiroshima Toyo Carp (NPB) (2009–present)

Mazda Zoom-Zoom Stadium Hiroshima (MAZDA Zoom-Zoom スタジアム広島, Matsuda Zūmu-Zūmu Sutajiamu Hiroshima), also called New Hiroshima Municipal Stadium (広島市民球場, Shin-Hiroshima Shimin Kyūjō), is a baseball stadium in Minami-ku, Hiroshima, Japan. It is used primarily for baseball and is the home of the Hiroshima Toyo Carp of the Japanese Central League. The ballpark has a capacity of 32,000 people and opened on April 10, 2009. It replaced First Hiroshima Municipal Stadium and initially retained the old ballpark's official name. The stadium architecture is considered to be labeled as a retro-classic ballpark.

== Naming rights ==
On November 6, 2008, Hiroshima City gave Mazda Motor Corporation naming rights to the stadium. In October of that year, Mazda proposed to call the stadium MAZDA Zoom-Zoom Stadium Hiroshima for the period between April 1, 2009 and March 31, 2014. On December 24, 2008, Mazda entered into a contract with the City of Hiroshima regarding the stadium's name and made official the abbreviated name "Mazda Stadium (マツダスタジアム)". The "Zoom-Zoom" name is a reference to Mazda's worldwide marketing slogan between 2000 and 2015.

== See also ==
- Lists of stadiums
- List of stadiums in Japan
