= 2024 Tohoku Rakuten Golden Eagles season =

Professional sports season in Nippon Professional Baseball

2024 Tohoku Rakuten Golden Eagles
- Interleague champions
- 20th anniversary logo
- League: Pacific League
- Ballpark: Rakuten Mobile Park Miyagi
- Record: 67–72–4 (.482), 23½ GB
- League place: 4th
- Parent company: Rakuten
- President: Masayuki Morii
- Manager: Toshiaki Imae
- Captain: Hideto Asamura (fielding); Takahiro Norimoto (pitching)
- Average attendance: 23,132

The 2024 Tohoku Rakuten Golden Eagles season was the 20th season of the Tohoku Rakuten Golden Eagles franchise. The Eagles play their home games at Rakuten Mobile Park Miyagi in the city of Sendai as members of Nippon Professional Baseball's Pacific League. The team was led by Toshiaki Imae in his first season as team manager.

== Regular season ==
=== Standings ===
2024 Pacific League regular season standings
Pos	Team	G	W	L	T	Pct.	GB	Home	Road
1	Fukuoka SoftBank Hawks^{†}	143	91	49	3	.650	—	49–21–2	42–28–1
2	Hokkaido Nippon-Ham Fighters*	143	75	60	8	.556	13½	41–25–6	34–35–2
3	Chiba Lotte Marines*	143	71	66	6	.518	18½	37–33–1	34–33–5
**4**	**Tohoku Rakuten Golden Eagles**	**143**	**67**	**72**	**4**	**.482**	**23½**	**30–39–2**	**37–33–2**
5	Orix Buffaloes	143	63	77	3	.450	28	34–36–1	29–41–2
6	Saitama Seibu Lions	143	49	91	3	.350	42	31–40–1	18–51–2

^{†} League champion and advanced directly to the final stage of the Climax Series
* Advanced to the first stage of the Climax Series

=== Record vs. opponents ===
2024 record vs. opponents
Team	Buffaloes	Eagles	Fighters	Hawks	Lions	Marines	CL
Buffaloes	—	15–10	12–12–1	6–18−1	12–13	8–16−1	10–8
**Eagles**	**10–15**	—	**10–13–2**	**9–16**	**14–10–1**	**11–13–1**	**13–5**
Fighters	12–12–1	13–10–2	—	12–12–1	13–10–2	18–6–1	7–10–1
Hawks	18–6−1	16–9	12–12–1	—	17–8	16–8−1	12–6
Lions	13–12	10–14–1	10–13–2	8–17	—	4–21	4–14
Marines	16–8−1	13–11–1	6–18–1	8–16−1	21–4	—	7–9−2

=== Interleague ===
2024 regular season interleague standings
Pos	Team	G	W	L	T	Pct.	GB	Home	Road
**1**	**Tohoku Rakuten Golden Eagles**^{†}	**18**	**13**	**5**	**0**	**.722**	—	**6–3**	**7–2**
2	Fukuoka SoftBank Hawks	18	12	6	0	.667	1	7–2	5–4
3	Yokohama DeNA BayStars	18	11	7	0	.611	2	3–6	8–1
4	Tokyo Yakult Swallows	18	9	7	2	.563	3	5–2−2	4–5
5	Orix Buffaloes	18	10	8	0	.556	3	4–5	6–3
6	Hiroshima Toyo Carp	18	10	8	0	.556	3	6–3	4–5
7	Yomiuri Giants	18	8	9	1	.471	4½	4–5	4–4–1
8	Chiba Lotte Marines	18	7	9	2	.438	5	4–5	3–4−2
9	Hokkaido Nippon-Ham Fighters	18	7	10	1	.412	5½	3–5–1	4–5
10	Hanshin Tigers	18	7	11	0	.388	6	4–5	3–6
11	Chunichi Dragons	18	7	11	0	.388	6	3–6	4–5
12	Saitama Seibu Lions	18	4	14	0	.222	9	3–6	2–7

^{†} Interleague champion

=== Chihō ballparks ===
The Eagles hosted five home games outside of Rakuten Mobile Park Miyagi in 2024. Four were played at chihō, or "countryside", ballparks in Fukushima, Aomori, Yamagata, and Akita Prefectures in Japan's Tōhoku region and the fifth was played at the Tokyo Dome in Tokyo. A sixth game was scheduled to be played in Iwate Prefecture, however the game was rained out and was instead played in Rakuten Mobile Park.

2024 Rakuten Eagles chihō ballparks
Ballpark	City	Prefecture
Fukushima Azuma Baseball Stadium	Fukushima	Fukushima Prefecture
Haruka Yume Stadium	Hirosaki	Aomori Prefecture
Kirayaka Stadium	Yamagata	Yamagata Prefecture
Kitagin Ballpark^{†}	Morioka	Iwate Prefecture
Komachi Stadium	Akita	Akita Prefecture
Tokyo Dome	Bunkyō	Tokyo

^{†} Game was rained out.

=== Opening Day starting roster ===
Friday, March 29, 2024, vs. Saitama Seibu Lions

2024 Rakuten Eagles Opening Day starting roster
Order	Player	Position
1	Eigoro Mogi	First baseman
2	Hiroto Kobukata	Second baseman
3	Yuya Ogo	Right fielder
4	Hideto Asamura	Third baseman
5	Hiroaki Shimauchi	Left fielder
6	Maikel Franco	Designated hitter
7	Ryosuke Tatsumi	Center fielder
8	Hikaru Ohta	Catcher
9	Itsuki Murabayashi	Shortstop
—	Takahisa Hayakawa	Starting pitcher

=== Game log ===
2024 game log: 70–71–2 (Home: 38–33–1; Away: 32–38–1)
March/April: 11–14–1 (Home: 5–8–1; Away: 6–6–0)

#	Date	Opponent	Score	Win	Loss	Save	Stadium	Attendance	Record	Streak
1	March 29	Lions	0–1	Imai (1–0)	**Hayakawa** (0–1)	Abreu (1)	Rakuten Mobile Park	25,069	0–1–0	L1
2	March 30	Lions	2–8	Sumida (1–0)	**Shoji** (0–1)	—	Rakuten Mobile Park	24,593	0–2–0	L2
3	March 31	Lions	4–3 (11)	**S. Watanabe** (1–0)	Itogawa (0–1)	—	Rakuten Mobile Park	24,501	1–2–0	W1
4	April 2	@ Fighters	4–2	**Ponce** (1–0)	Yamasaki (0–1)	**Norimoto** (1)	Es Con Field	30,728	2–2–0	W2
5	April 3	@ Fighters	2–4	Kitayama (1–0)	**Kishi** (0–1)	S. Tanaka (2)	Es Con Field	27,042	2–3–0	L1
6	April 5	Hawks	1–6	Ishikawa (1–0)	**Hayakawa** (0–2)	—	Rakuten Mobile Park	23,506	2–4–0	L2
7	April 6	Hawks	4–5	Fujii (1–0)	**Turley** (0–1)	Osuna (4)	Rakuten Mobile Park	23,801	2–5–0	L3
8	April 7	Hawks	3–2	**Norimoto** (1–0)	Sawayanagi (0–1)	—	Rakuten Mobile Park	23,457	3–5–0	W1
9	April 9	@ Buffaloes	4–5	Tajima (1–0)	**Ponce** (1–1)	Yo. Hirano (3)	Kyocera Dome	19,256	3–6–0	L1
10	April 10	@ Buffaloes	5–4 (10)	**Nishigaki** (1–0)	Yamazaki (0–1)	**Norimoto** (2)	Kyocera Dome	19,667	4–6–0	W1
11	April 11	@ Buffaloes	1–2	Yo. Hirano (1–0)	**Nishigaki** (1–1)	—	Kyocera Dome	18,214	4–7–0	L1
12	April 12	Marines	5–2	**Hayakawa** (1–2)	Ojima (1–2)	**Norimoto** (3)	Rakuten Mobile Park	20,213	5–7–0	W1
13	April 13	Marines	2−2	Game tied after 12 innings			Rakuten Mobile Park	24,075	5–7–1	T1
14	April 14	Marines	2–9	Sasaki (2–0)	**Fujii** (0–1)	—	Rakuten Mobile Park	25,020	5–8–1	L1
15	April 16	Buffaloes	6–2	**Ponce** (2–1)	Tajima (1–1)	—	Rakuten Mobile Park	19,079	6–8–1	W1
16	April 17	Buffaloes	0–5	Espinoza (3–0)	**Kishi** (0–2)	—	Rakuten Mobile Park	20,735	6–9–1	L1
17	April 18	Buffaloes	0–7	Sotani (1–1)	**Uchi** (0–1)	—	Rakuten Mobile Park	21,974	6–10–1	L2
18	April 19	@ Lions	4–5	Imai (2–0)	**Hayakawa** (1–3)	Abreu (5)	Belluna Dome	17,811	6–11–1	L3
19	April 20	@ Lions	8–2	**T. Sakai** (1–0)	S. Sato (0–1)	—	Belluna Dome	20,109	7–11–1	W1
20	April 21	@ Lions	1–0	**Fujii** (1–1)	K. Takahashi (0–2)	**Nishigaki** (1)	Belluna Dome	25,210	8–11–1	W2
21	April 23	Fighters	3–4 (12)	S. Tanaka (1–0)	**Nishigaki** (1–2)	Sugiura (1)	Rakuten Mobile Park	21,892	8–12–1	L1
—	April 24	Fighters	Postponed (rain) – Makeup date: October 5				Rakuten Mobile Park	—	—	—
22	April 25	Fighters	5–1	**Kishi** (1–2)	Suzuki (0–1)	—	Rakuten Mobile Park	21,850	9–12–1	W1
23	April 27	@ Marines	4–1	**Uchi** (1–1)	Sawamura (0–1)	**Norimoto** (4)	Zozo Marine Stadium	24,478	10–12–1	W2
24	April 28	@ Marines	1–10	Ojima (2–3)	**Takinaka** (0–1)	—	Zozo Marine Stadium	27,945	10–13–1	L1
25	April 29	@ Marines	8–6	**Shoji** (1–1)	Taneichi (1–3)	**Norimoto** (5)	Zozo Marine Stadium	23,599	11–13–1	W1
26	April 30	@ Hawks	0–8	Arihara (3–2)	**Ponce** (2–2)	—	Mizuho PayPay Dome	40,142	11–14–1	L1

May: 10–13–0 (Home: 5–6–0; Away: 5–7–0)

#	Date	Opponent	Score	Win	Loss	Save	Stadium	Attendance	Record	Streak
27	May 1	@ Hawks	4–3	**S. Suzuki** (1–0)	Osuna (0–1)	**Norimoto** (6)	Mizuho PayPay Dome	40,142	12–14–1	W1
28	May 3	Marines	12–1	**Hayakawa** (2–3)	Nishino (2–3)	—	Rakuten Mobile Park	23,572	13–14–1	W2
29	May 4	Marines	0–2	Iwashita (2–0)	**Uchi** (1–2)	Masuda (4)	Rakuten Mobile Park	24,010	13–15–1	L1
30	May 5	Marines	1–4	Ojima (3–3)	**Kishi** (1–3)	—	Rakuten Mobile Park	25,039	13–16–1	L2
31	May 6	Buffaloes	2–4	Sotani (2–1)	**Shoji** (1–2)	Machado (2)	Rakuten Mobile Park	20,769	13–17–1	L3
32	May 8	Buffaloes	4–1	**Fujii** (2–1)	Miyagi (2–4)	**Norimoto** (7)	Komachi Stadium	14,047	14–17–1	W1
33	May 10	@ Lions	13–2	**Hayakawa** (3–3)	Aoyama (0–1)	—	Belluna Dome	14,409	15–17–1	W2
34	May 11	@ Lions	1–2	Takeuchi (3–0)	**Uchi** (1–3)	Abreu (8)	Belluna Dome	19,482	15–18–1	L1
35	May 12	@ Lions	2–6	Imai (3–0)	**Kishi** (1–4)	—	Belluna Dome	19,185	15–19–1	L2
36	May 14	Hawks	4–1	**Ponce** (3–2)	Arihara (3–3)	**Norimoto** (8)	Rakuten Mobile Park	24,043	16–19–1	W1
37	May 15	Hawks	3–7	Hasegawa (3–2)	**Shoji** (1–3)	—	Rakuten Mobile Park	24,193	16–20–1	L1
38	May 17	@ Buffaloes	5–3	**CH. Sung** (1–0)	Takashima (0–1)	**Norimoto** (9)	Kyocera Dome	31,932	17–20–1	W1
39	May 18	@ Buffaloes	3–8	Sotani (3–1)	**Uchi** (1–4)	—	Kyocera Dome	30,977	17–21–1	L1
40	May 19	@ Buffaloes	2–3 (10)	Iguchi (1–0)	**T. Sakai** (1–1)	—	Kyocera Dome	31,664	17–22–1	L2
41	May 21	@ Hawks	0–21	Arihara (4–3)	**Ponce** (3–3)	—	Mizuho PayPay Dome	40,142	17–23–1	L3
42	May 22	@ Hawks	0–12	Wada (2–0)	**Shoji** (1–4)	—	Kyocera Dome	33,293	17–24–1	L4
43	May 24	Fighters	3–4 (10)	S. Tanaka (2–0)	**CH. Sung** (1–1)	Sugiura (2)	Rakuten Mobile Park	24,783	17–25–1	L5
44	May 25	Fighters	0–5	T. Kato (3–4)	**Koja** (0–1)	—	Rakuten Mobile Park	25,034	17–26–1	L6
45	May 26	Fighters	3–2	**Kishi** (2–4)	Yanagawa (0–1)	**Norimoto** (10)	Rakuten Mobile Park	23,735	18–26–1	W1
46	May 28	@ BayStars	1–6 (7)	Kay (3–4)	**Ponce** (3–4)	—	Yokohama Stadium	29,710	18–27–1	L1
47	May 29	@ BayStars	4–0	**Uchi** (2–4)	Jackson (2–4)	—	Yokohama Stadium	32,141	19–27–1	W1
48	May 30	@ BayStars	6–5	**Fujii** (3–1)	K. Ishida (2–3)	**Norimoto** (11)	Yokohama Stadium	31,209	20–27–1	W2
49	May 31	Swallows	5–3	**S. Watanabe** (2–0)	Espada (0–2)	—	Azuma Baseball Stadium	12,223	21–27–1	W3

June: 12–9–1 (Home: 8–5–0; Away: 4–4–1)

#	Date	Opponent	Score	Win	Loss	Save	Stadium	Attendance	Record	Streak
50	June 1	Swallows	8–2	**Matsui** (1–0)	Yajure (4–5)	—	Rakuten Mobile Park	25,337	22–27–1	W4
51	June 2	Swallows	0–4 (5)	Ishikawa (1–1)	**Kishi** (2–5)	—	Rakuten Mobile Park	25,303	22–28–1	L1
52	June 4	@ Tigers	3–1 (10)	**S. Suzuki** (2–0)	Guerra (0–3)	**Norimoto** (12)	Koshien Stadium	42,622	23–28–1	W1
53	June 5	Tigers	3–2	**S. Watanabe** (3–0)	Iwazaki (2–3)	**Norimoto** (13)	Koshien Stadium	42,615	24–28–1	W2
54	June 6	Tigers	4–1	**Fujii** (4–1)	Nishi (2–3)	**S. Suzuki** (1)	Koshien Stadium	42,625	25–28–1	W3
55	June 7	@ Dragons	2–0	**Hayakawa** (4–3)	Wakui (2–4)	**Norimoto** (14)	Vantelin Dome	30,254	26–28–1	W4
56	June 8	@ Dragons	7–2	**Koja** (1–1)	Mejía (3–3)	—	Vantelin Dome	36,296	27–28–1	W5
57	June 9	@ Dragons	1–3	Matsuba (3–3)	**Kishi** (2–6)	Martínez (19)	Vantelin Dome	36,294	27–29–1	L1
58	June 11	Giants	7–6	**Tsurusaki** (1–0)	Baldonado (1–3)	—	Rakuten Mobile Park	22,844	28–29–1	W1
59	June 12	Giants	5–4	**Uchi** (3–4)	Hotta (3–3)	**Norimoto** (15)	Rakuten Mobile Park	23,623	29–29–1	W2
60	June 13	Giants	3–0	**Fujii** (5–1)	Inoue (2–4)	**Norimoto** (16)	Rakuten Mobile Park	23,251	30–29–1	W3
61	June 14	Carp	0–1 (11)	Moriura (1–0)	**CH. Sung** (1–2)	Hearn (1)	Rakuten Mobile Park	25,202	30–30–1	L1
62	June 15	Carp	3–4	Tamamura (1–2)	**Koja** (1–2)	Kuribayashi (19)	Rakuten Mobile Park	26,153	30–31–1	L2
63	June 16	Carp	5–3	**Yuge** (1–0)	Aduwa (5–2)	—	Rakuten Mobile Park	25,761	31–31–1	W1
64	June 21	@ Fighters	9−9	Game tied after 12 innings			Es Con Field	22,592	31–31–2	T1
65	June 22	@ Fighters	2–5	Itoh (6–1)	**Ponce** (3–5)	S. Tanaka (11)	Es Con Field	30,648	31–32–2	L1
66	June 23	@ Fighters	6–2	**Fujii** (6–1)	T. Kato (3–5)	**Norimoto** (17)	Es Con Field	27,704	32–32–2	W1
67	June 25	@ Marines	2–10	Nishino (5–5)	**Uchi** (3–5)	—	Zozo Marine Stadium	22,377	32–33–2	L1
68	June 26	@ Marines	1–4	Nakamori (1–0)	**Kishi** (2–7)	Masuda (10)	Zozo Marine Stadium	22,681	32–34–2	L2
69	June 28	Lions	0–4	Imai (4–4)	**Koja** (1–3)	—	Kirayaka Stadium	10,013	32–35–2	L3
70	June 29	Lions	2–4	Sumida (6–5)	**Takinaka** (0–2)	Abreu (14)	Rakuten Mobile Park	25,527	32–36–2	L4
71	June 30	Lions	2–1	**S. Watanabe** (4–0)	Honda (0–3)	**Norimoto** (18)	Rakuten Mobile Park	24,064	33–36–2	W1

July: 12–8–0 (Home: 5–4–0; Away: 7–4–0)

#	Date	Opponent	Score	Win	Loss	Save	Stadium	Attendance	Record	Streak
72	July 2	Buffaloes	1–4	Sotani (5–3)	**Uchi** (3–6)	Machado (12)	Haruka Yume Ballpark	11,525	33–37–2	L1
—	July 3	Buffaloes	Postponed (rain) – Makeup date: October 6				Kitagin Ballpark	—	—	—
73	July 5	@ Hawks	5–1	**Hayakawa** (5–3)	Wada (2–2)	—	Mizuho PayPay Dome	39,197	34–37–2	W1
74	July 6	@ Hawks	4–0	**Koja** (2–3)	Ohtsu (6–4)	—	Mizuho PayPay Dome	38,974	35–37–2	W2
75	July 7	@ Hawks	3–5	Hernández (3–0)	**T. Sakai** (1–2)	Y. Matsumoto (2)	Mizuho PayPay Dome	39,021	35–38–2	L1
76	July 9	@ Marines	4–2	**Uchi** (4–6)	Mercedes (2–4)	—	Zozo Marine Stadium	19,832	36–38–2	W1
77	July 10	@ Marines	5–18	A. Ishikawa (2–0)	**Matsui** (1–1)	Hirohata (1)	Zozo Marine Stadium	21,511	36–39–2	L1
78	July 12	Lions	3–2	**Hayakawa** (6–3)	Takeuchi (5–1)	**Norimoto** (19)	Rakuten Mobile Park	24,502	37–39–2	W1
79	July 13	Lions	5–0	**Kishi** (3–7)	Imai (4–6)	—	Rakuten Mobile Park	25,640	38–39–2	W2
80	July 14	Lions	4–2	**T. Sakai** (2–2)	Sumida (6–7)	**Norimoto** (20)	Rakuten Mobile Park	25,046	39–39–2	W3
81	July 15	@ Fighters	16–3	**Takinaka** (1–2)	Fukushima (1–2)	—	Es Con Field	30,163	40–39–2	W4
82	July 16	@ Fighters	4–5 (10)	Ikeda (1–0)	**Norimoto** (1–1)	—	Es Con Field	24,061	40–40–2	L1
83	July 17	@ Fighters	2–6	Kanemura (4–4)	**Koja** (2–4)	S. Tanaka (14)	Es Con Field	24,337	40–41–2	L2
84	July 19	@ Buffaloes	3–2	**Hayakawa** (7–3)	Sotani (5–5)	**Norimoto** (21)	Hotto Motto Field	24,752	41–41–2	W1
85	July 20	@ Buffaloes	3–2 (12)	**Norimoto** (2–1)	Yamashita (0–4)	**Turley** (1)	Hotto Motto Field	29,264	42–41–2	W2
86	July 21	@ Buffaloes	12–5	**Fujii** (7–1)	Satoh (1–1)	—	Hotto Motto Field	34,565	43–41–2	W3
All-Star Break: CL and PL split series, 1–1
87	July 26	Marines	1–6	Nishino (8–5)	**Uchi** (4–7)	—	Rakuten Mobile Park	23,633	43–42–2	L1
88	July 27	Marines	3–5	Karakawa (1–0)	**Ponce** (3–6)	Masuda (16)	Rakuten Mobile Park	25,437	43–43–2	L2
89	July 28	Marines	8–7	**Norimoto** (3–1)	Masuda (1–3)	—	Rakuten Mobile Park	25,026	44–43–2	W1
90	July 30	Hawks	1–10	Moinelo (7–3)	**Hayakawa** (7–4)	—	Rakuten Mobile Park	23,710	44–44–2	L1
91	July 31	Hawks	3–2	**Koja** (3–4)	Ohtsu (6–5)	**Norimoto** (22)	Rakuten Mobile Park	22,076	45–44–2	W1

August: 11–12–1 (Home: 3–7–0; Away: 8–5–1)

#	Date	Opponent	Score	Win	Loss	Save	Stadium	Attendance	Record	Streak
92	August 1	Hawks	0–7	Sawayanagi (1–1)	**Fujii** (7–2)	—	Tokyo Dome	40,648	45–45–2	L1
93	August 2	@ Lions	3–2	**Uchi** (5–7)	Imai (4–7)	**Norimoto** (23)	Belluna Dome	18,768	46–45–2	W1
94	August 3	@ Lions	0–7	Takeuchi (7–2)	**Takinaka** (1–3)	—	Belluna Dome	22,045	46–46–2	L1
95	August 4	@ Lions	10–5	**S. Watanabe** (5–0)	Mizukami (1–1)	—	Belluna Dome	22,927	47–46–2	W1
96	August 6	Fighters	1–5 (10)	Kanemura (5–4)	**Norimoto** (3–2)	—	Rakuten Mobile Park	22,052	47–47–2	L1
97	August 7	Fighters	0–2	Nabatame (1–1)	**Kishi** (3–8)	Yanagawa (1)	Rakuten Mobile Park	20,808	47–48–2	L2
98	August 8	Fighters	4–5	T. Kato (5–7)	**Fujii** (7–3)	Yanagawa (2)	Rakuten Mobile Park	22,639	47–49–2	L3
99	August 10	@ Hawks	13–6	**Koja** (4–4)	Arihara (10–5)	—	Mizuho PayPay Dome	38,955	48–49–2	W1
100	August 11	@ Hawks	2–5	Stewart, Jr. (7–2)	**Takinaka** (1–4)	Y. Matsumoto (10)	Mizuho PayPay Dome	40,142	48–50–2	L1
101	August 12	@ Hawks	4–14	Ohzeki (7–2)	**Tsurusaki** (1–1)	—	Mizuho PayPay Dome	39,732	48–51–2	L2
102	August 13	@ Buffaloes	3–0	**Hayakawa** (8–4)	Sotani (5–8)	—	Kyocera Dome	31,855	49–51–2	W1
103	August 14	@ Buffaloes	6–1	**Uchi** (6–7)	Espinoza (7–6)	—	Kyocera Dome	32,335	50–51–2	W2
104	August 15	@ Buffaloes	2–3	Machado (3–2)	**S. Watanabe** (5–1)	—	Kyocera Dome	28,150	50–52–2	L1
—	August 16	Lions	Postponed (rain) – Makeup date: October 4				Rakuten Mobile Park	—	—	—
105	August 17	Lions	4–11	Imai (5–8)	**Koja** (4–5)	—	Rakuten Mobile Park	23,019	50–53–2	L2
106	August 18	Lions	6–1	**Takinaka** (2–4)	Takeuchi (7–4)	—	Rakuten Mobile Park	23,239	51–53–2	W1
107	August 20	Hawks	3–0	**Hayakawa** (9–4)	Moinelo (9–4)	**Norimoto** (24)	Rakuten Mobile Park	25,872	52–53–2	W2
108	August 21	Hawks	2–1	**Yuge** (2–0)	Y. Matsumoto (2–2)	—	Rakuten Mobile Park	24,364	53–53–2	W3
109	August 23	@ Lions	2–1	**Fujii** (8–3)	Matsumoto (1–7)	**Norimoto** (25)	Belluna Dome	21,533	54–53–2	W4
110	August 24	@ Lions	2–3	Imai (6–8)	**Kishi** (3–9)	Abreu (21)	Belluna Dome	22,842	54–54–2	L1
111	August 25	@ Lions	2–0	**Koja** (5–5)	Takeuchi (7–5)	**Norimoto** (26)	Belluna Dome	25,986	55–54–2	W1
112	August 27	@ Fighters	3−3	Game tied after 12 innings			Es Con Field	26,383	55–54–3	T1
113	August 28	@ Fighters	9–5	**S. Watanabe** (6–1)	Yamasaki (9–4)	—	Es Con Field	27,321	56–54–3	W1
114	August 30	Buffaloes	0–2	Sotani (6–9)	**Fujii** (8–4)	Machado (22)	Rakuten Mobile Park	22,654	56–55–3	L1
115	August 31	Buffaloes	0–6	Miyagi (5–8)	**Kishi** (3–10)	—	Rakuten Mobile Park	25,372	56–56–3	L2

September/October: 11–16–1 (Home: 6–9–1; Away: 5–7–0)

#	Date	Opponent	Score	Win	Loss	Save	Stadium	Attendance	Record	Streak
116	September 1	Buffaloes	2–6	Suzuki (1–0)	**S. Watanabe** (6–2)	—	Rakuten Mobile Park	25,065	56–57–3	L3
117	September 2	Buffaloes	5–2	**Takinaka** (3–4)	Takashima (1–2)	**Norimoto** (27)	Rakuten Mobile Park	21,268	57–57–3	W1
118	September 5	@ Marines	1–3	Keuchel (1–1)	**Fujii** (8–5)	Masuda (21)	Zozo Marine Stadium	25,030	57–58–3	L1
119	September 6	@ Marines	2–1	**Hayakawa** (10–4)	Nishino (8–8)	**Norimoto** (28)	Zozo Marine Stadium	28,704	58–58–3	W1
120	September 7	@ Marines	4–1	**Kishi** (4–10)	Ojima (9–10)	**Norimoto** (29)	Zozo Marine Stadium	28,480	59–58–3	W2
121	September 8	@ Marines	5–9	Sasaki (8–4)	**Uchi** (6–8)	—	Zozo Marine Stadium	25,650	59–59–3	L1
122	September 10	Hawks	1–4	Ishikawa (5–2)	**Koja** (5–6)	Hernández (2)	Rakuten Mobile Park	20,997	59–60–3	L2
123	September 11	Hawks	2–9	Ohzeki (8–3)	**Takinaka** (3–5)	—	Rakuten Mobile Park	21,331	59–61–3	L3
124	September 12	@ Lions	7–3	**Fujii** (9–5)	Sugiyama (0–1)	—	Belluna Dome	14,657	60–61–3	W1
125	September 14	Fighters	7–5	**Hayakawa** (11–4)	T. Kato (9–8)	**Norimoto** (30)	Rakuten Mobile Park	24,767	61–61–3	W2
—	September 15	Fighters	Postponed (rain) – Makeup date: October 7				Rakuten Mobile Park	—	—	—
126	September 16	Fighters	6–5	**Kishi** (5–10)	Ikeda (2–1)	**Norimoto** (31)	Rakuten Mobile Park	23,875	62–61–3	W3
127	September 17	Marines	5–4 (10)	**S. Watanabe** (7–2)	Kuniyoshi (3–1)	—	Rakuten Mobile Park	21,793	63–61–3	W4
128	September 18	Marines	8–1	**Fujii** (10–5)	Keuchel (2–2)	—	Rakuten Mobile Park	24,809	64–61–3	W5
129	September 20	@ Fighters	3–7	VerHagen (2–1)	**Hayakawa** (11–5)	—	Es Con Field	30,881	64–62–3	L1
130	September 21	@ Hawks	2–3	S. Ogata (2–0)	**Norimoto** (3–3)	—	Mizuho PayPay Dome	40,142	64–63–3	L2
131	September 22	@ Hawks	5–11	Iwai (1–0)	**Takada** (0–1)	—	Mizuho PayPay Dome	40,142	64–64–3	L3
132	September 23	@ Marines	6–0	**Kishi** (6–10)	Karakawa (3–1)	—	Zozo Marine Stadium	24,765	65–64–3	W1
133	September 25	@ Fighters	3–1	**Fujii** (11–5)	Kanemura (6–6)	**Norimoto** (32)	Es Con Field	30,710	66–64–3	W2
134	September 26	@ Fighters	1–2	Itoh (14–4)	**Koja** (5–7)	—	Es Con Field	30,241	66–65–3	L1
135	September 28	Buffaloes	2–5	Takashima (2–2)	**M. Tanaka** (0–1)	Perdomo (4)	Rakuten Mobile Park	25,953	66–66–3	L2
136	September 29	Buffaloes	1–8	Miyagi (6–9)	**Takinaka** (3–6)	—	Rakuten Mobile Park	24,799	66–67–3	L3
137	September 30	Marines	1–2	Kikuchi (1–0)	**Norimoto** (3–4)	Masuda (25)	Rakuten Mobile Park	24,040	66–68–3	L4
138	October 1	Marines	1–5	Sasaki (10–5)	**Kishi** (6–11)	—	Rakuten Mobile Park	24,621	66–69–3	L5
139	October 3	@ Hawks	2–4	Arihara (14–7)	**Koja** (5–8)	Osuna (24)	Mizuho PayPay Dome	36,777	66–70–3	L6
—	October 4	Lions	Postponed (rain) – Makeup date: October 9				Rakuten Mobile Park	—	—	—
140	October 5	Fighters	2–3	Kanemura (7–6)	**Fujihira** (0–1)	Y. Saitoh (1)	Rakuten Mobile Park	25,072	66–71–3	L7
141	October 6	Buffaloes	1–8 (7)	Miyagi (7–9)	**Hayakawa** (11–6)	—	Rakuten Mobile Park	22,346	66–72–3	L8
—	October 7	Fighters	Postponed (rain) – Makeup date: October 8				Rakuten Mobile Park	—	—	—
142	October 8	Fighters	2–0	**Takinaka** (4–6)	Itoh (14–5)	Fujihira (1)	Rakuten Mobile Park	11,543	67–72–3	W1
143	October 9	Lions	2−2	Game tied after 12 innings			Rakuten Mobile Park	24,539	67–72–4	T1

Win | Loss | Tie | Postponement | = Interleague play
**Bold** = Eagles team member

== Roster ==
2024 Tohoku Rakuten Golden Eagles
Roster
Pitchers: 11 Takayuki Kishi; 13 Cody Ponce; 14 Takahiro Norimoto; 17 Tatsuki Koja; 18 Masahiro Tanaka; 19 Kosei Shoji; 20 Nik Turley; 21 Takahisa Hayakawa; 22 Ryuji Komago; 28 Tomohito Sakai; 29 Koichi Takada; 31 Shota Watanabe; 38 Hayato Yuge; 40 Shuto Sakurai; 41 Mao Itoh; 43 Sung Chia-hao; 45 Tomotaka Matsui; 46 Shoma Fujihira; 47 Masaru Fujii; 49 Masaya Nishigaki; 52 Taisei Tsurusaki; 53 Haruto Sakai; 54 Naoki Hinata; 56 Sora Suzuki; 57 Ryota Takinaka; 61 Takuma Matsuda; 69 Seiryu Uchi; 71 Kazuki Yoshikawa; 72 Satoshi Miyamori; 79 Kotaro Seimiya	Catchers: 2 Hikaru Ohta; 44 Takaya Tanaka; 55 Yuma Yasuda; 65 Kengo Horiuchi; 70 Tsuyoshi Ishihara; Infielders: 0 Hiroto Kobukata; 3 Hideto Asamura; 4 Toshiki Abe; 5 Eigoro Mogi; 7 Daichi Suzuki; 23 Maikel Franco; 24 Fumiya Kurokawa; 30 Ryuya Taira; 34 Tsuyoshi Yamasaki; 39 Yukiya Itoh; 42 Haruka Yamada; 48 Yoshiaki Watanabe; 63 Daiki Irie; 66 Itsuki Murabayashi; 78 Konosuke Tatsumi	Outfielders: 8 Ryosuke Tatsumi; 25 Kazuki Tanaka; 27 Takero Okajima; 32 Daisuke Nakashima; 35 Hiroaki Shimauchi; 50 Atsuki Mutoh; 51 Yuya Ogo	Manager: 98 Toshiaki Imae; Coaches: 74 Naoto Watanabe (head); 93 Taketoshi Goto (hitting); 89 Keizo Kawashima (hitting); 83 Satoshi Nagai (pitching); 81 Koji Aoyama (pitching); 82 Naoki Matoba (battery); 86 Tatsuya Shiokawa (infield defense/baserunning); 76 Yoshifumi Okada (outfield defense/baserunning)

== Player statistics ==
=== Batting ===
2024 Tohoku Rakuten Golden Eagles batting statistics
Player	G	AB	R	H	2B	3B	HR	RBI	SB	BB	K	AVG	OBP	SLG	TB
Toshiki Abe	78	229	19	52	13	2	9	32	0	20	54	.227	.292	.419	96
Hideto Asamura	143	471	51	119	19	0	14	60	1	68	101	.253	.346	.382	180
Maikel Franco	68	229	20	50	5	0	8	30	0	9	49	.218	.251	.345	79
Masaru Fujii	22	4	0	1	0	0	0	1	0	0	1	.250	.250	.250	1
Takahisa Hayakawa	25	3	0	1	0	0	0	0	0	0	2	.333	.333	.333	1
Kengo Horiuchi	4	6	0	0	0	0	0	0	0	0	1	.000	.000	.000	0
Daiki Irie	5	12	2	5	0	0	0	0	0	1	3	.417	.462	.417	5
Tsuyoshi Ishihara	68	146	9	25	5	0	4	13	0	13	50	.171	.239	.288	42
Yukiya Itoh	44	115	10	30	6	1	2	10	0	5	34	.261	.298	.383	44
Takayuki Kishi	22	1	0	0	0	0	0	0	0	1	0	.000	.500	.000	0
Hiroto Kobukata	134	450	50	103	9	4	3	23	29	42	84	.229	.296	.287	129
Tatsuki Koja	15	1	1	0	0	0	0	0	0	0	1	.000	.000	.000	0
Fumiya Kurokawa	22	56	8	13	1	0	1	8	0	4	12	.232	.283	.304	17
Eigoro Mogi	46	68	6	18	4	1	1	8	0	5	13	.265	.311	.397	27
Itsuki Murabayashi	139	518	51	125	13	3	6	50	5	21	91	.241	.270	.313	162
Atsuki Mutoh	7	5	0	1	0	0	0	0	0	0	2	.200	.200	.200	1
Daisuke Nakashima	37	123	18	28	8	1	1	10	1	2	21	.228	.258	.333	41
Yuya Ogo	143	565	64	145	24	6	7	49	32	68	120	.257	.337	.358	202
Hikaru Ohta	94	230	23	45	10	3	2	23	2	13	58	.196	.244	.291	67
Takero Okajima	31	80	6	16	1	1	1	6	0	11	15	.200	.304	.275	22
Cody Ponce	15	2	0	0	0	0	0	0	0	0	2	.000	.000	.000	0
Hiroaki Shimauchi	40	131	8	28	3	1	0	12	0	16	16	.214	.307	.252	33
Daichi Suzuki	123	406	41	108	11	5	4	41	0	23	43	.266	.324	.347	141
Ryuya Taira	18	21	4	3	0	0	0	3	0	2	3	.143	.217	.143	3
Kazuki Tanaka	68	31	8	4	1	0	0	1	0	0	9	.129	.129	.161	5
Takaya Tanaka	17	10	0	1	0	0	0	0	0	2	4	.100	.250	.100	1
Konosuke Tatsumi	2	3	1	0	0	0	0	0	0	0	2	.000	.000	.000	0
Ryosuke Tatsumi	143	537	68	158	22	12	7	58	20	44	108	.294	.353	.419	225
Seiryu Uchi	20	4	0	0	0	0	0	0	0	0	3	.000	.000	.000	0
Yoshiaki Watanabe	47	136	9	34	2	0	0	11	0	11	26	.250	.302	.265	36
Haruka Yamada	25	25	2	4	2	0	0	1	0	2	10	.160	.222	.240	6
Tsuyoshi Yamasaki	5	6	1	0	0	0	0	0	0	0	1	.000	.000	.000	0
Yuma Yasuda	34	122	12	32	6	0	2	9	0	6	38	.262	.297	.361	44
Total：33 players	143	4,746	492	1,149	165	40	72	459	90	389	977	.242	.303	.339	1,610

Bold/italics denotes best in the league

=== Pitching ===
2024 Tohoku Rakuten Golden Eagles pitching statistics
Player	W	L	ERA	G	GS	SV	IP	H	R	ER	BB	K
Shoma Fujihira	0	1	1.75	47	0	1	46.1	29	11	9	12	58
Masaru Fujii	11	5	2.93	22	22	0	126	138	45	41	29	74
Takahisa Hayakawa	11	6	2.54	25	25	0	170.1	156	54	48	35	160
Naoki Hinata	0	0	0.00	1	0	0	1	1	0	0	1	1
Mao Itoh	0	0	7.94	6	0	0	5.2	7	5	5	4	6
Takayuki Kishi	6	11	2.83	22	22	0	143.1	144	52	45	29	73
Tatsuki Koja	5	8	4.32	15	15	0	83.1	70	42	40	31	58
Ryuji Komago	0	0	0.00	2	0	0	1	1	0	0	0	0
Takuma Matsuda	0	0	3.60	7	1	0	15	14	6	6	9	8
Tomotaka Matsui	1	1	6.75	7	3	0	22.2	30	18	17	14	10
Satoshi Miyamori	0	0	1.00	9	0	0	9	5	1	1	2	5
Masaya Nishigaki	1	2	7.50	18	0	1	18	28	18	15	12	13
Takahiro Norimoto	3	4	3.46	54	0	32	52	57	21	20	11	44
Cody Ponce	3	6	6.72	15	12	0	67	92	55	50	16	56
Haruto Sakai	0	0	0.00	1	0	0	1	1	0	0	2	0
Tomohito Sakai	2	2	2.33	49	0	0	46.1	35	13	12	15	29
Shuto Sakurai	0	0	8.44	8	0	0	10.2	11	10	10	8	9
Kotaro Seimiya	0	0	12.00	3	0	0	3	4	4	4	3	1
Kosei Shoji	1	4	6.98	7	7	0	29.2	32	26	23	18	26
Sung Chia-hao	1	2	3.18	41	0	0	39.2	41	15	14	7	22
Sora Suzuki	2	0	1.66	49	0	1	48.2	24	9	9	21	48
Koichi Takada	0	1	6.97	5	1	0	10.1	13	8	8	3	4
Ryota Takinaka	4	6	4.16	12	12	0	71.1	74	36	33	14	26
Masahiro Tanaka	0	1	7.20	1	1	0	5	6	4	4	2	1
Taisei Tsurusaki	1	1	6.85	14	2	0	23.2	36	19	18	5	14
Nik Turley	0	1	2.93	17	0	1	15.1	15	5	5	12	13
Seiryu Uchi	6	8	3.58	20	20	0	110.2	113	49	44	28	45
Shota Watanabe	7	2	3.04	49	0	0	47.1	42	19	16	22	41
Kazuki Yoshikawa	0	0	5.40	13	0	0	20	32	12	12	8	17
Hayato Yuge	2	0	5.94	34	0	0	33.1	42	22	22	9	28
Total: 30 players	67	72	3.73	143	143	36	1,276.2	1,293	579	529	382	890

Bold/italics denotes best in the league

== Awards and honors ==
Best Nine Award

- Hiroto Kobukata - second baseman
- Ryosuke Tatsumi - outfielder

Mitsui Golden Glove Award

- Hiroto Kobukata - second baseman
- Ryosuke Tatsumi - outfielder

All-Star Series selections

- Takahiro Norimoto - pitcher
- Masaru Fujii - pitcher
- Daichi Suzuki - infielder
- Ryosuke Tatsumi - outfielder

All-Star Game Fighting Spirit Award

- Ryosuke Tatsumi - Game 2

SKY PerfecTV! Sayonara Award

- Yuya Ogo - June (June 11)

== Farm team ==
2024 Eastern League regular season standings
Pos	Team	G	W	L	T	Pct.	GB	Home	Road
1	Yokohama DeNA BayStars^{†}	126	69	48	9	.590	—	42–18–4	27–30–5
2	Yomiuri Giants	130	69	52	9	.570	2	41–16–6	28–36–3
3	Saitama Seibu Lions	126	65	53	8	.551	4½	34–21–3	31–32–5
4	Hokkaido Nippon-Ham Fighters	121	62	54	5	.534	6½	36–23–1	26–31–4
5	Tokyo Yakult Swallows	125	59	59	7	.500	10½	35–25–4	24–34–3
6	Chiba Lotte Marines	122	56	63	3	.471	14	32–31–2	24–32–1
7	Tohoku Rakuten Golden Eagles	124	51	61	12	.455	15½	30–22–7	21–39–5
8	Oisix Niigata Albirex	126	41	79	6	.342	29½	33–28–3	8–51–3

^{†} League champion

== Nippon Professional Baseball draft ==
2024 Tohoku Rakuten Golden Eagles draft selections
Round	Name	Position	Affiliation	Signed?
1	Rui Muneyama	Infielder	Meiji University	Yes
2	Kazuto Tokuyama	Pitcher	International Pacific University	Yes
3	Haruto Nakagomi	Pitcher	Tokushima Indigo Socks	Yes
4	Masahiro Ehara	Infielder	Nippon Steel	Yes
5	Tsubasa Yoshino	Pitcher	Waseda University	Yes
6	Yang Po-hsiang	Outfielder	Ibaraki Astro Planets	Yes
Development players
1	Yuya Kishimoto	Infielder	Nara University High School	Yes
