= 2026 Tohoku Rakuten Golden Eagles season =

Professional sports season in Nippon Professional Baseball

2026 Tohoku Rakuten Golden Eagles
- 2026 "Tohoku Series" logo
- League: Pacific League
- Ballpark: Rakuten Mobile Saikyo Park Miyagi
- Record: 18–24–1 (.429), 6.5 GB
- League place: 6th
- Parent company: Rakuten
- President: Masayuki Morii
- General manager: Kazuhisa Ishii
- Manager: Hajime Miki (until 17 June); Tatsuya Shiokawa (acting manager); Masato Yoshii (from 17 June)

The 2026 Tohoku Rakuten Golden Eagles season is the ongoing 22nd season of the Tohoku Rakuten Golden Eagles franchise. The Eagles play their home games at Rakuten Mobile Saikyo Park Miyagi in the city of Sendai as members of Nippon Professional Baseball's Pacific League. The team is led by Hajime Miki in his second season in his second stint as team manager, and his third season overall.

Miki took a leave of absence for poor results and the head coach Tatsuya Shiokawa had taken command as acting manager from 10 June to 17 June. The team announced that Miki departed from the team and Masato Yoshii was appointed as the new manager on 17 June.

== Regular season ==
2026 Pacific League regular season standings
Pos	Team	G	W	L	T	Pct.	GB	Home	Road
1	Orix Buffaloes	43	25	18	0	.581	—	18–4–0	7–14–0
2	Saitama Seibu Lions	45	25	19	1	.568	½	12–10–1	13–9–0
3	Hokkaido Nippon-Ham Fighters	46	23	23	0	.500	3½	13–9–0	10–14–0
4	Fukuoka Softbank Hawks	42	20	22	0	.476	4½	13–9–0	10–14–0
5	Chiba Lotte Marines	43	19	24	0	.442	6	13–9–0	6–15–0
6	Tohoku Rakuten Golden Eagles	43	18	24	1	.429	6½	11–10–0	7–14–1

=== Chihō ballparks ===
The Eagles will host five home games outside of Rakuten Mobile Saikyo Park Miyagi in 2026. Five will be played at chihō, or "countryside", ballparks in the remaining five prefectures that make up Japan's Tōhoku region: Fukushima, Aomori, Yamagata, and Akita Prefectures. A sixth will be played at the Tokyo Dome in Tokyo.

2026 Rakuten Eagles chihō ballparks
Ballpark	City	Prefecture
Haruka Yume Stadium	Hirosaki	Aomori Prefecture
Kirayaka Stadium	Yamagata	Yamagata Prefecture
York Kaiseizan Stadium	Kōriyama	Fukushima Prefecture
Komachi Stadium	Akita	Akita Prefecture
Kitagin Ballpark	Morioka	Iwate Prefecture
Tokyo Dome	Bunkyō	Tokyo

=== Game log ===
2026 game log: 18–24–1 (Home: 11–10–0; Away: 7–14–1)
March/April: 0–0–0 (Home: 0–0–0; Away: 0–0–0)

#	Date	Opponent	Score	Win	Loss	Save	Stadium	Attendance	Record	Streak
1	March 27	@ Buffaloes	10–0	**Shoji** (1–0)	Miyagi (0–1)	—	Kyocera Dome	35,942	1–0–0	W1
2	March 28	@ Buffaloes	0–6	Kuri (1–0)	**Takinaka** (0–1)	—	Kyocera Dome	30,991	1–1–0	L1
3	March 29	@ Buffaloes	4–5	Yamazaki (1–0)	**Fujiwara** (0–1)	Machado (1)	Kyocera Dome	34,537	1–2–0	L2
4	March 31	Hawks	2–4	Ohzeki (1–0)	**K. Maeda** (0–1)	Sugiyama (2)	Rakuten Mobile Park	24,882	1–3–0	L3
5	April 1	Hawks	1–6	Hsu (1–0)	**Koja** (0–1)	—	Rakuten Mobile Park	24,584	1–4–0	L4
6	April 2	Hawks	5–4	**Nishigaki** (1–0)	Y. Matsumoto (1–1)	**Fujihira** (1)	Rakuten Mobile Park	24,088	2–4–0	W1
7	April 3	@ Lions	6–3	**Shoji** (2–0)	Y. Watanabe (0–2)	**Fujihira** (2)	Belluna Dome	20,103	3–4–0	W2
8	April 4	@ Lions	2–1	**Sung** (1–0)	Kaino (0–1)	**C. Tanaka** (1)	Belluna Dome	21,983	4–4–0	W3
9	April 5	@ Lions	1−1	Game tied after 12 innings			Belluna Dome	27,090	4–4–1	T1
10	April 7	Fighters	3–0	**Kajiya** (1–0)	Hosono (1–1)	**Fujihira** (3)	Rakuten Mobile Park	24,770	5–4–1	W1
11	April 8	Fighters	0–1	Kitayama (1–1)	**Koja** (0–2)	Yanagawa (2)	Rakuten Mobile Park	23,615	5–5–1	L1
12	April 9	Fighters	2–4	T. Katoh (2–0)	**Uchi** (0–1)	Yanagawa (3)	Rakuten Mobile Park	22,609	5–6–1	L2
—	April 10	Buffaloes	Postponed (rain) – Makeup date: TBD				Rakuten Mobile Park	—	—	—
13	April 11	Buffaloes	11–4	**Hayakawa** (1–0)	Kuri (1–1)	—	Rakuten Mobile Park	24,340	6–6–1	W1
14	April 12	Buffaloes	4–0	**Takinaka** (1–1)	Hjelle (0–1)	—	Rakuten Mobile Park	24,908	7–6–1	W2
15	April 14	@ Hawks	3–2	**Shoji** (3–0)	Stewart Jr. (2–1)	**Fujihira** (4)	Mizuho PayPay Dome	37,996	8–6–1	W3
16	April 15	@ Hawks	3–2	**Sung** (2–0)	S. Ogata (0–1)	**Fujihira** (5)	Mizuho PayPay Dome	38,057	9–6–1	W4
17	April 16	@ Hawks	0–6	Ohtsu (2–0)	**Fujiwara** (0–2)	—	Kitakyushu Stadium	19,288	9–7–1	L1
18	April 17	Marines	1–0 (11)	**Kajiya** (2–0)	Sakamoto (0–1)	—	Rakuten Mobile Park	24,265	10–7–1	W1
19	April 18	Marines	1–0	**Ureña** (1–0)	H. Tanaka (1–2)	—	Rakuten Mobile Park	24,046	11–7–1	W2
20	April 19	Marines	5–8	Takano (1–2)	C. Tanaka (0–1)	Yokoyama (5)	Rakuten Mobile Park	24,353	11–8–1	L1
21	April 21	@ Fighters	1–3	Tatsu (2–1)	Shoji (3–1)	Yanagawa (5)	Es Con Field	29,000	11–9–1	L2
22	April 22	@ Fighters	4–4	Shimamoto (1–0)	C. Tanaka (0–2)	—	Es Con Field	28,254	11–10–1	L3

May: 0–0–0 (Home: 0–0–0; Away: 0–0–0)

#	Date	Opponent	Score	Win	Loss	Save	Stadium	Attendance	Record	Streak

June: 0–0–0 (Home: 0–0–0; Away: 0–0–0)

#	Date	Opponent	Score	Win	Loss	Save	Stadium	Attendance	Record	Streak

July: 0–0–0 (Home: 0–0–0; Away: 0–0–0)

#	Date	Opponent	Score	Win	Loss	Save	Stadium	Attendance	Record	Streak

August: 0–0–0 (Home: 0–0–0; Away: 0–0–0)

#	Date	Opponent	Score	Win	Loss	Save	Stadium	Attendance	Record	Streak

September/October: 0–0–0 (Home: 0–0–0; Away: 0–0–0)

#	Date	Opponent	Score	Win	Loss	Save	Stadium	Attendance	Record	Streak

Win | Loss | Tie | Postponement | = Interleague play
**Bold** = Eagles team member

== Roster ==
Tohoku Rakuten Golden Eagles roster
First team		Second team
Pitchers: 13 Sōta Fujiwara; 18 Kenta Maeda; 19 Kōsei Shōji; 20 Tatsuki Itoh; 21 Takahisa Hayakawa; 22 José Ureña; 23 Yunior Marte; 41 Ren Kajiya; 45 Ryu Kutani; 46 Shōma Fujihira; 49 Masaya Nishigaki; 59 Katsutoshi Tai; 62 Naoto Nishiguchi; Catchers: 2 Hikaru Ohta; 44 Takaya Tanaka; 55 YG Yasuda; 65 Kengo Horiuchi	Infielders: 0 Hiroto Kobukata; 1 Rui Muneyama; 6 Itsuki Murabayashi; 24 Fumiya Kurokawa; 30 Akira Shigenaga; 35 Yoshiaki Watanabe; 48 Ryūya Taira; 73 Kohtarō Komori; Outfielders: 8 Ryōsuke Tatsumi; 32 Daisuke Nakashima; 34 Carson McCusker; 42 Shoya Sakaue; 51 Yūya Ogoh; Manager: 81 Masato Yoshii; Coaches: 86 Tatsuya Shiokawa (Head); 89 Hiroshi Watanabe (Batting); 76 Tatsuya Shimozono (Batting); 84 Yūhei (Batting); 94 Katsumi Yamashita (Batting); 91 Yūya Kubo (Pitching); 80 Takashi Ishii (Pitching); 92 Chikara Onodera (Pitching); 81 Kōji Aoyama (Pitching); 96 Takahiro Shiomi (Pitching); 93 Suguru Ino (Battery); 97 Takahiro Shimotsuma (Battery); 95 Ryōsuke Morioka (Infield defense/base running); 83 Masato Watanabe (Infield defense/base running); 99 Shinichi Kawana (Outfield defense/base running); 85 Akihisa Makida (Outfield defense/base running)	Pitchers: 11 Takayuki Kishi; 17 Tatsuki Koja; 26 Haruto Nakagomi; 28 Tomohito Sakai; 29 Chiharu Tanaka; 31 Shōta Watanabe; 40 Masahiro Ehara; 47 Masaru Fujii; 52 Taisei Tsurusaki; 53 Haruto Sakai; 54 Naoki Hinata; 56 Sora Suzuki; 57 Ryōta Takinaka; 58 Wataru Karashima; 61 Kōsei Koga; 64 Yūki Hayashi; 66 Ryuta Konno; 67 Seiya Ohuchi; 69 Seiryū Uchi; 71 Daichi Shibata; 79 Taisei Itoh; Catchers: 27 Hikaru Itoh; 37 Takuya Kai; 70 Tsuyoshi Ishihara; 72 Toshiya Ohsakae	Infielders: 3 Hideto Asamura; 7 Daichi Suzuki; 9 Luke Voit; 39 Yukiya Itoh; 60 Waters; 63 Daiki Irie; 68 Takumi Aono; 75 Yang Po-hsiang; 98 Kyōsuke Kaneko; Outfielders: 25 Kazuki Tanaka; 36 Tsubasa Yoshinoh; 38 Naoki Satō; 50 Atsuki Mutoh; 78 Sōshi Yoshino; Manager: 74 Naoto Watanabe; Coaches: 87 Yasunaga Makishi (General development); 90 Fumitoshi Takano (Development)
Development Players
101 Liu Chih-Jung (P); 130 Yonawil Florimon (P); 133 Takuma Nakazawa (P); 197 Hsiao Chi (P); 122 Taiga Shimahara (C); 132 Yūya Kishimoto (IF); 126 Daita Horomura (OF); 129 Shion Ohtsubo (OF)
Updated November 4, 2026		→ All NPB rosters
