= Norimoto =

Norimoto (written: 則本) is a Japanese surname. Notable people with the surname include:

- Takahiro Norimoto (則本 昂大, born 1990), Japanese baseball player

Norimoto (written: 紀基) is also a masculine Japanese given name. Notable people with the name include:

- Norimoto Yoda (依田 紀基, born 1966), Japanese Go player
