= Shōma Kanemura =

Japanese baseball player (born 2000)

Shōma Kanemura 金村 尚真
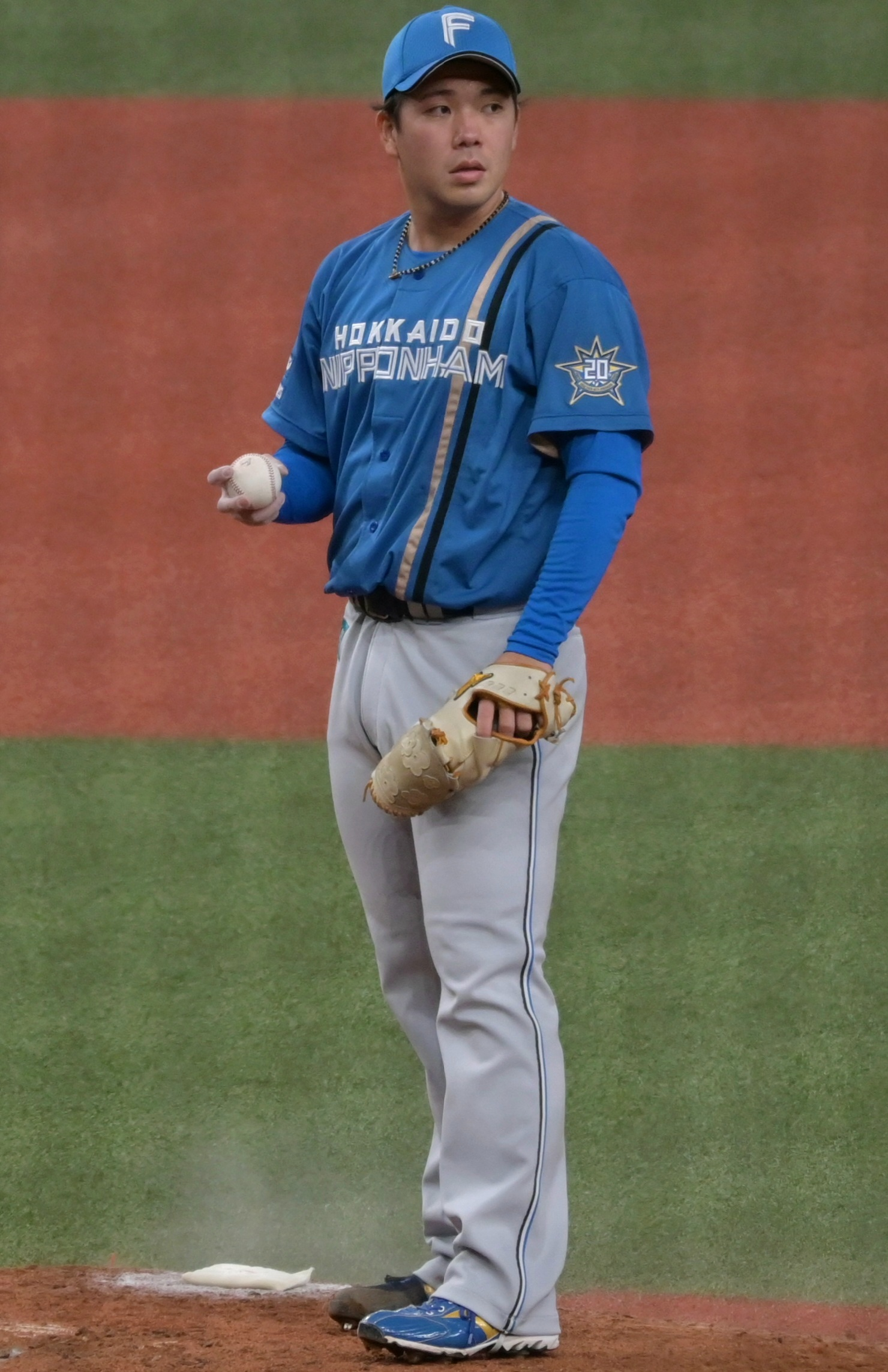

Hokkaido Nippon-Ham Fighters – No. 24
- Pitcher
- Born: August 29, 2000 (age 25); Tomigusuku, Okinawa, Japan
- Bats: Right Throws: Right

NPB debut
- April 2, 2023, for the Hokkaido Nippon-Ham Fighters

Career statistics (through 2025 season)
- Win–loss record: 14-14
- Earned Run Average: 2.53
- Strikeouts: 183
- Saves: 0
- Holds: 11
- Stats at Baseball Reference

Teams
- Hokkaido Nippon-Ham Fighters (2023–present)

Shōma Kanemura (金村 尚真, Kanemura Shōma; born August 29, 2000 in Tomigusuku, Okinawa, Japan) is a Japanese professional baseball pitcher for the Hokkaido Nippon-Ham Fighters of Nippon Professional Baseball (NPB).
