= Anderson Espinoza =

Venezuelan baseball player (born 1998)

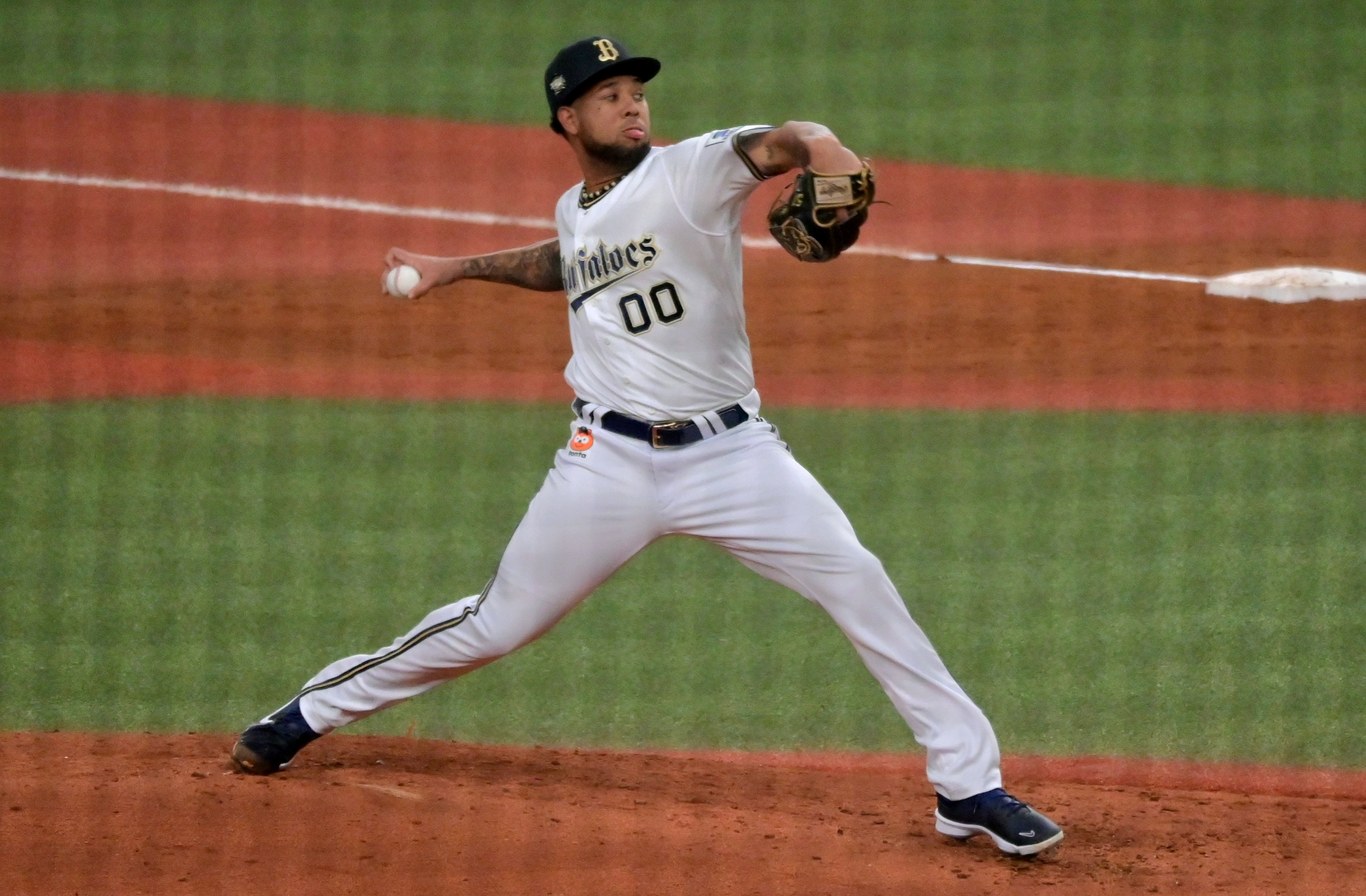
- Espinoza with the Orix Buffaloes in 2024

Orix Buffaloes – No. 00
- Pitcher
- Born: March 9, 1998 (age 28); Caracas, Venezuela
- Bats: Right Throws: Right

Professional debut
- MLB: May 30, 2022, for the Chicago Cubs
- NPB: March 30, 2024, for the Orix Buffaloes

MLB statistics (through 2022 season)
- Win–loss record: 0–2
- Earned run average: 5.40
- Strikeouts: 19

NPB statistics (through August 21, 2026)
- Win–loss record: 23–21
- Earned run average: 2.70
- Strikeouts: 336
- Stats at Baseball Reference

Teams
- Chicago Cubs (2022); Orix Buffaloes (2024–present)

Career highlights and awards
- NPB All-Star (2024)

Anderson José Espinoza (born March 9, 1998) is a Venezuelan professional baseball pitcher for the Orix Buffaloes of Nippon Professional Baseball (NPB). He has previously played in Major League Baseball (MLB) for the Chicago Cubs.

Espinoza pitched in the farm system of the Boston Red Sox before being acquired by the San Diego Padres in July 2016. He underwent Tommy John surgery in both 2017 and 2019, and did not return to game action until May 2021. He was traded to the Cubs that July and made his MLB debut the next year.

== Scouting report ==
According to baseball scouts, at age 17 Espinoza featured a solid three-pitch mix and had advanced pitchability, repeating his delivery and throwing strikes much more easily than a typical pitcher of that age. He had been throwing his fastball in the low 90s and topping out at 94 mph (151 km/h), with potential to throw even harder as he grows. His secondary pitches included a sharp curveball in the 71–73 mph (114–117 km/h) range and a sinking changeup as his third option. His arm was quick, and he delivered his pitches with clean mechanics and a minimum of effort.

== Professional career ==
=== Boston Red Sox ===
Espinoza signed with the Boston Red Sox as an international free agent in October 2014, receiving a reported bonus of $1.8 million plus $200,000 in scholarship money. Additionally, Espinoza was Baseball America’s fourth-ranked international amateur prospect and top-ranked pitcher, while grabbing the number 10 spot on MLB.com’s list.

Espinoza joined the Dominican Summer League Red Sox 2 on June 1, 2015. He made quick work of that circuit, allowing only two earned runs on 13 hits and two walks for a 1.20 ERA, while striking out 21 batters in 15 innings. In addition to a strong statistical performance, his fastball was reported to touch 99 mph (159 km/h) sometimes. He then earned a promotion to the rookie level Gulf Coast League Red Sox late in the month. Instead of finding himself challenged, Espinoza was even more dominant there, giving up just three earned runs in 40 innings, good for a 0.68 ERA to go with a .170 opponents batting average and 40 strikeouts against nine walks, helping the GCL Red Sox clinch their second title in a row. The precocious right-hander completed his third level of the season with his promotion to the Low-A Greenville Drive, and made his first pitching appearance on September 5. With his debut, Espinoza became the first pitcher in his age 17 season to make a start in the full-season Class A South Atlantic League since 2006, when Deolis Guerra did it for the New York Mets affiliate Hagerstown Suns. In 15 starts between three levels, Espinoza posted a 1.23 ERA with 0.99 WHIP while striking out 65 in 58 1/3 innings. He was kept on a strict four-inning limit per game.

Espinoza opened the 2016 season with Greenville.

=== San Diego Padres ===
On July 14, 2016, the Red Sox traded Espinoza to the San Diego Padres in exchange for pitcher Drew Pomeranz. The Padres assigned Espinoza to the Class A Fort Wayne TinCaps. He finished 2016 with a 6–11 record with a 4.49 ERA. Espinoza started the 2017 season on the disabled list with an elbow injury. On July 28, 2017, he was diagnosed with a torn ulnar collateral ligament in his pitching elbow. He underwent Tommy John surgery which sidelined him for the remainder of the 2017 season and the entire 2018 season.

The Padres added Espinoza to their 40-man roster after the 2018 season. Espinoza underwent a second Tommy John surgery on April 22, 2019, and missed the entire 2019 season. He also did not play in 2020, as the minor league season was cancelled due to the COVID-19 pandemic. In early May 2021, Espinoza appeared in a regular-season game for the first time since 2016, pitching two scoreless innings for Fort Wayne.

=== Chicago Cubs ===
On July 30, 2021, Espinoza was traded to the Chicago Cubs in exchange for Jake Marisnick. He was assigned to the South Bend Cubs, but was eventually promoted to the Double–A Tennessee Smokies.

On May 30, 2022, he was called up to the MLB and made his debut later that day. In 7 games during his rookie campaign, Espinoza registered a 5.40 ERA with 19 strikeouts in 18 1/3 innings pitched. On November 10, Espinoza was removed from the 40-man roster and sent outright to the Triple–A Iowa Cubs; he elected free agency the same day.

=== San Diego Padres (second stint) ===
On December 12, 2022, Espinoza signed a minor league deal with an invitation to spring training with the San Diego Padres. He made 28 starts for the Triple–A El Paso Chihuahuas in 2023, registering an 8–9 record and 6.15 ERA with 117 strikeouts across 131 2/3 innings of work. Espinoza elected free agency following the season on November 6.

=== Orix Buffaloes ===
On January 16, 2024, Espinoza signed with the Orix Buffaloes of Nippon Professional Baseball. He made 22 appearances for Orix, compiling a 7–9 record and 2.63 ERA with 113 strikeouts across 133 2/3 innings pitched. On October 8, Espinoza re–signed with the Buffaloes for the 2025 season.
