= Ryuhei Sotani =

Japanese baseball player (born 2000)

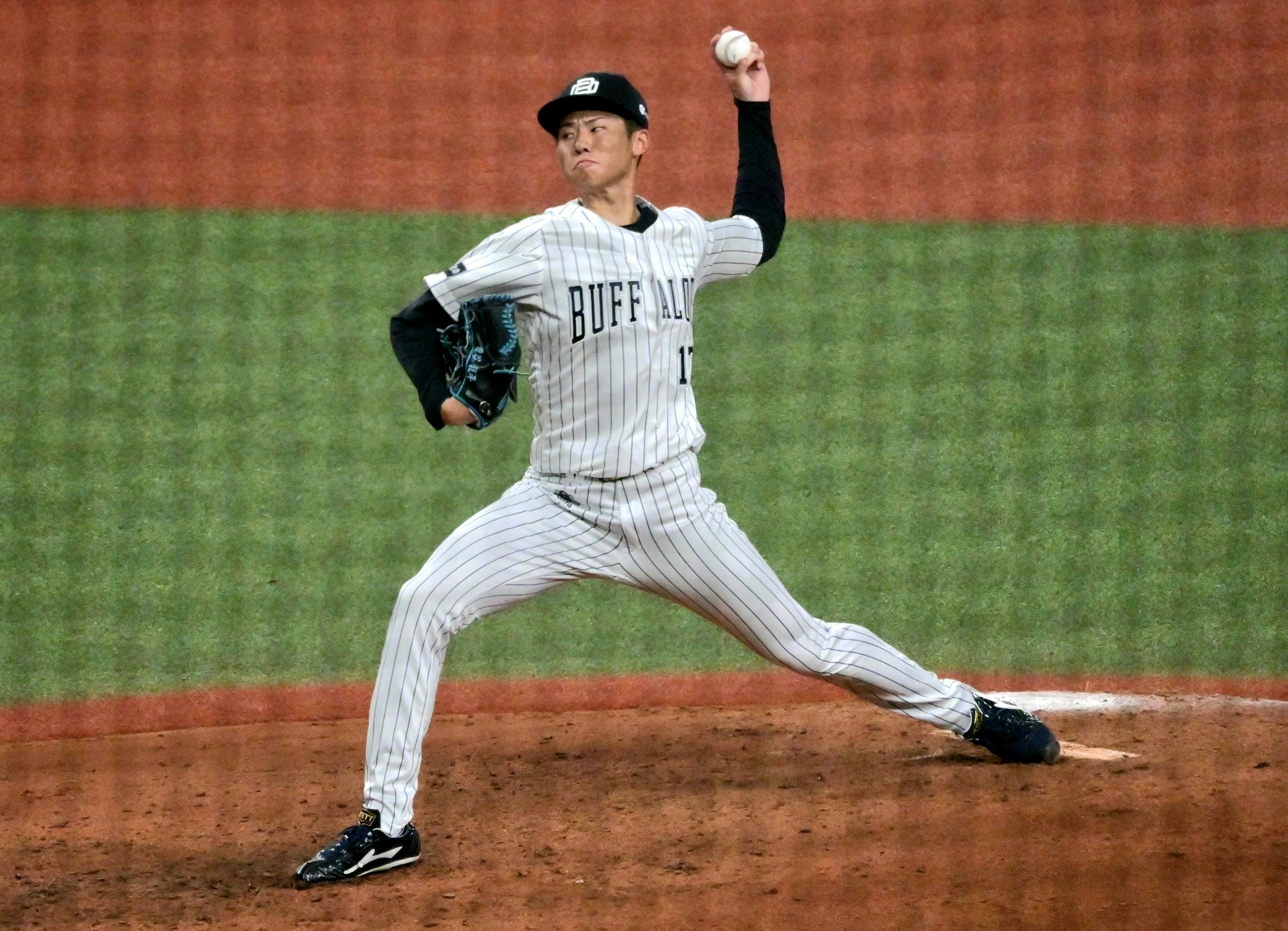

Orix Buffaloes – No. 17
- Pitcher
- Born: November 30, 2000 (age 25); Ikoma District, Nara, Japan
- Bats: Left Throws: Left

NPB debut
- April 26, 2023, for the Orix Buffaloes

Career statistics (through 2025 season)
- Win–loss record: 16-21
- Earned Run Average: 3.25
- Strikeouts: 246
- Saves: 0
- Holds: 0

Teams
- Orix Buffaloes (2023–present)

Ryuhei Sotani (曽谷 龍平, Sotani Ryuhei; born November 30, 2000 in Ikoma, Nara, Japan) is a professional Japanese baseball player. He plays pitcher for the Orix Buffaloes.
