= Haruka Yamada =

Japanese baseball player (born 1996)

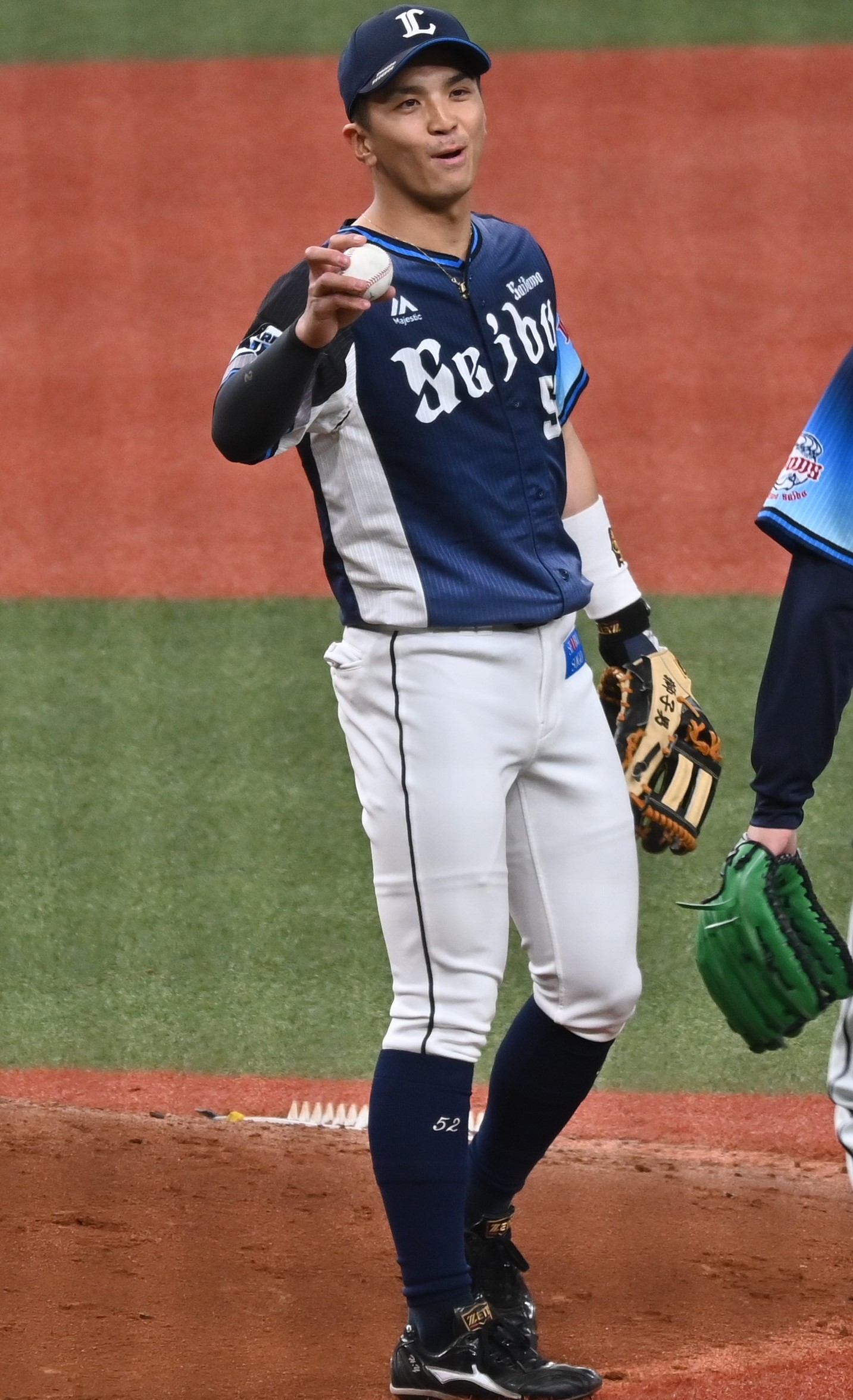

Tohoku Rakuten Golden Eagles – No. 42
- Infielder
- Born: September 30, 1996 (age 29); Saga, Saga, Japan
- Bats: Right Throws: Right

NPB debut
- June 16, 2018, for the Saitama Seibu Lions

Career statistics (through 2023 season)
- Batting Average: .199
- Home Runs: 1
- RBIs: 30

Teams
- Saitama Seibu Lions (2015-2022); Hokkaido Nippon-Ham Fighters (2023); Tohoku Rakuten Golden Eagles (2024-present)

Haruka Yamada (山田 遥楓, Yamada Haruka; born September 30, 1996) is a professional Japanese baseball infielder for the Tohoku Rakuten Golden Eagles of Nippon Professional Baseball (NPB). He has previously played in NPB for the Saitama Seibu Lions and the Hokkaido Nippon-Ham Fighters.
