= Seiryū Uchi =

Japanese baseball player (born 2002)

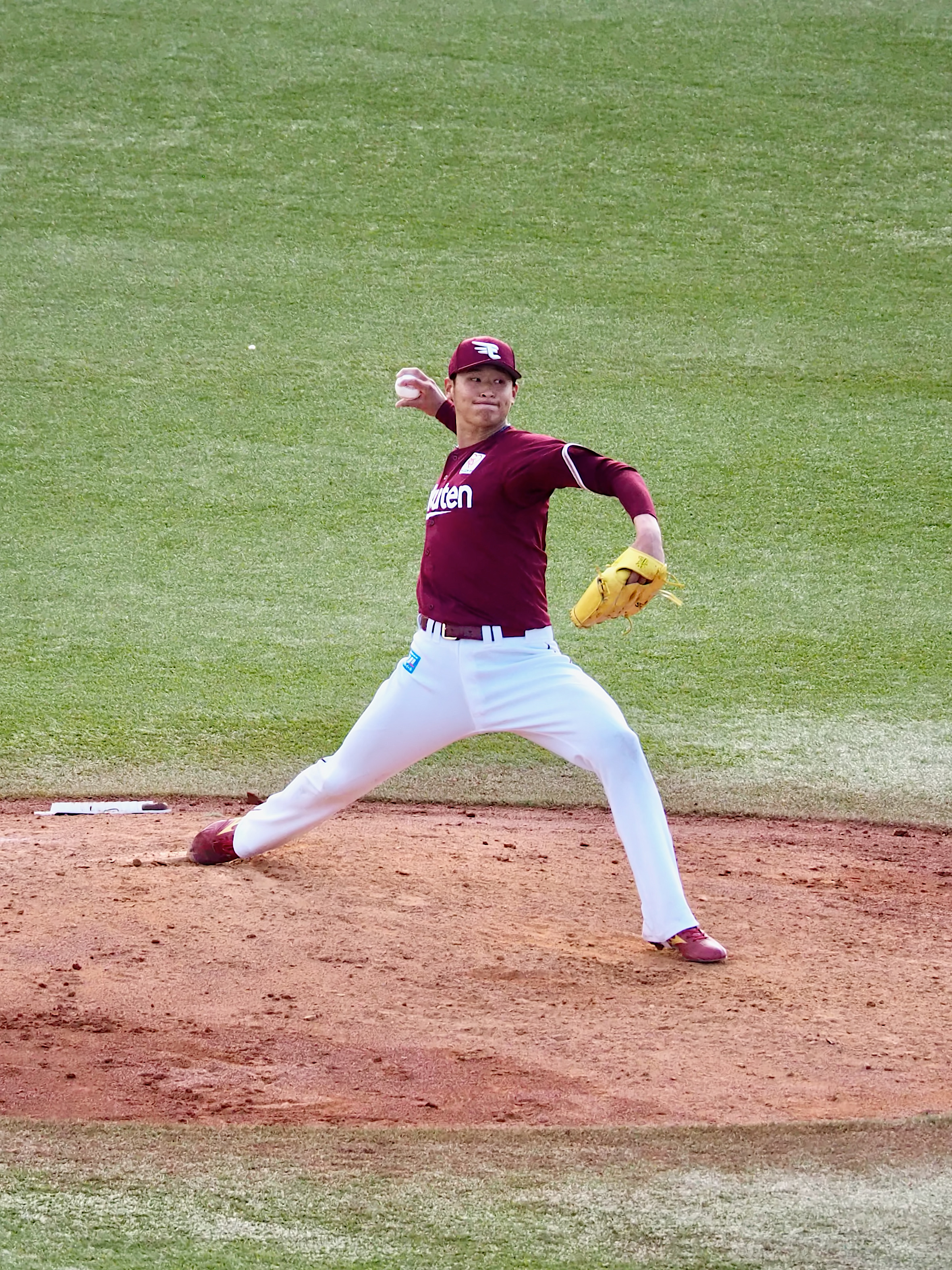

Tohoku Rakuten Golden Eagles – No. 69
- Pitcher
- Born: April 24, 2002 (age 23); Suita, Osaka, Japan
- Bats: Left Throws: Right

NPB debut
- April 9, 2023, for the Tohoku Rakuten Golden Eagles

NPB statistics (through 2024 season)
- Win–loss record: 10-10
- ERA: 3.14
- Strikeouts: 80
- Saves: 0
- Holds: 7

Teams
- Tohoku Rakuten Golden Eagles (2021–present)

Seiryū Uchi (内 星龍, Uchi Seiryū; born April 24, 2002 in Suita, Osaka, Japan) is a professional Japanese baseball player. He plays pitcher for the Tohoku Rakuten Golden Eagles.
