= Yūya Ogō =

Japanese baseball player (born 1996)

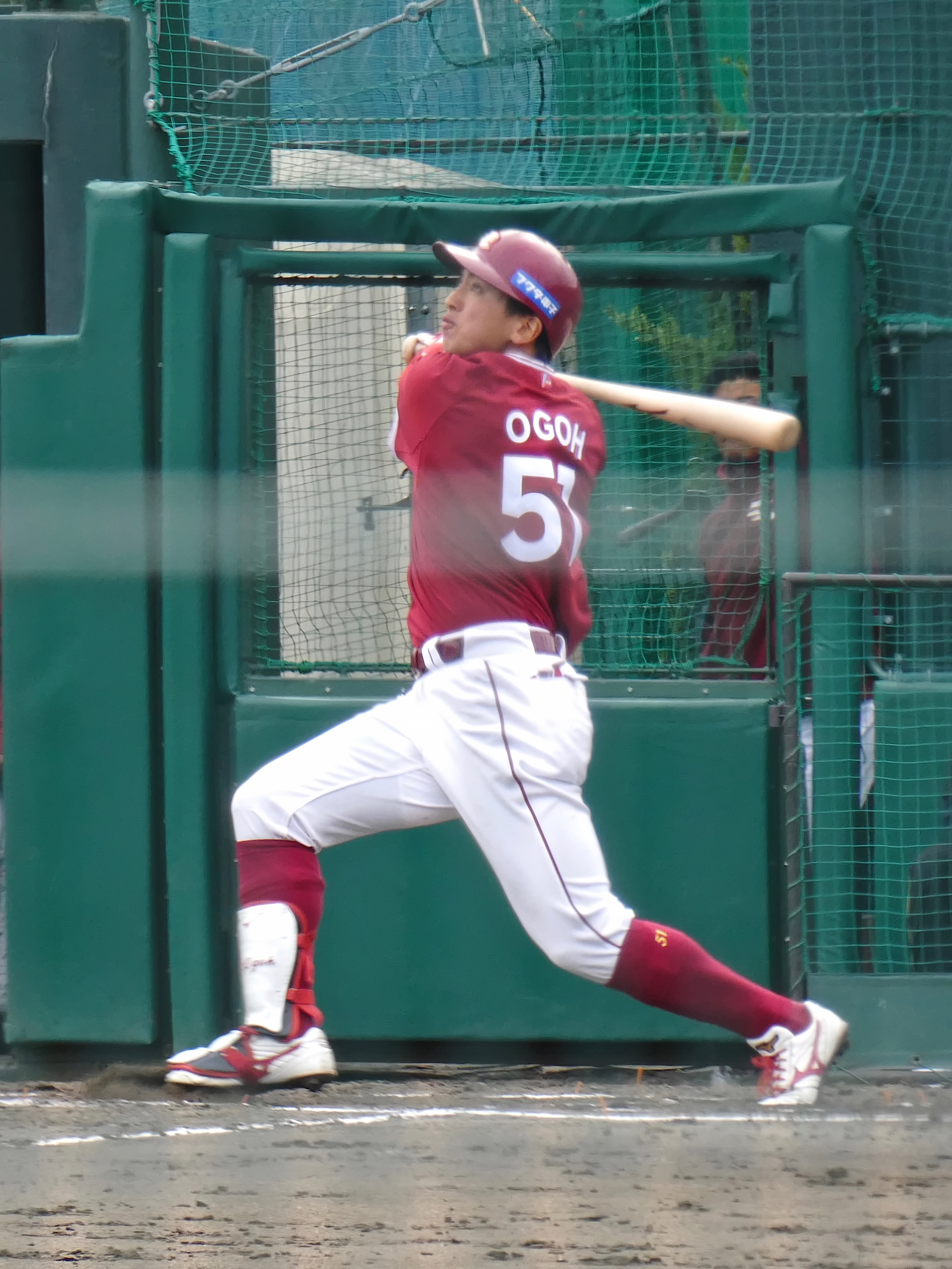

Tohoku Rakuten Golden Eagles – No. 51
- Outfielder
- Born: August 3, 1996 (age 29); Kurashiki, Okayama, Japan
- Bats: Left Throws: Right

NPB debut
- May 19, 2019, for the Tohoku Rakuten Golden Eagles

NPB statistics (through 2023 season)
- Batting average: .250
- Hits: 155
- Home runs: 18
- Runs batted in: 73
- Stolen base: 22

Teams
- Tohoku Rakuten Golden Eagles (2019–present)

Yūya Ogō (小郷 裕哉, Ogō Yūya; born October 3, 1996 in Kurashiki, Okayama, Japan) is a professional Japanese baseball player. He plays outfielder for the Tohoku Rakuten Golden Eagles.
