= Shota Watanabe =

Japanese baseball player (born 2000)

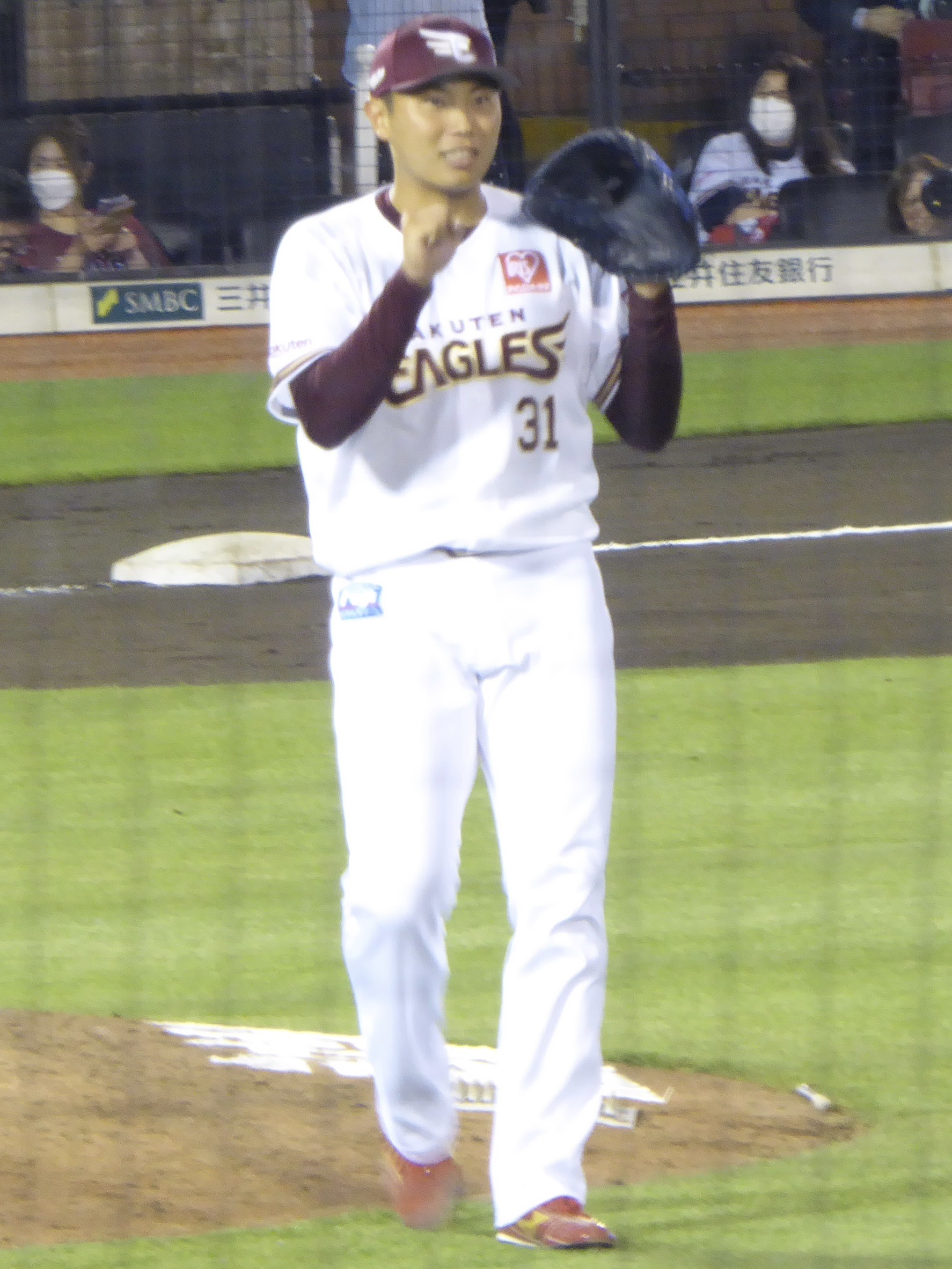

Tohoku Rakuten Golden Eagles – No. 31
- Pitcher
- Born: October 29, 2000 (age 25); Kitakyushu, Fukuoka, Japan
- Bats: Right Throws: Right

NPB debut
- June 3, 2023, for the Tohoku Rakuten Golden Eagles

NPB statistics (through 2024 season)
- Win–loss record: 15-5
- ERA: 2.72
- Strikeouts: 82
- Saves: 1
- Holds: 37

Teams
- Tohoku Rakuten Golden Eagles (2023–present)

Shota Watanabe (渡辺 翔太, Watanabe Shota; born October 29, 2000 in Kitakyushu, Fukuoka, Japan) is a professional Japanese baseball player. He plays pitcher for the Tohoku Rakuten Golden Eagles.
