= Takahisa Hayakawa =

Japanese baseball player (born 1998)

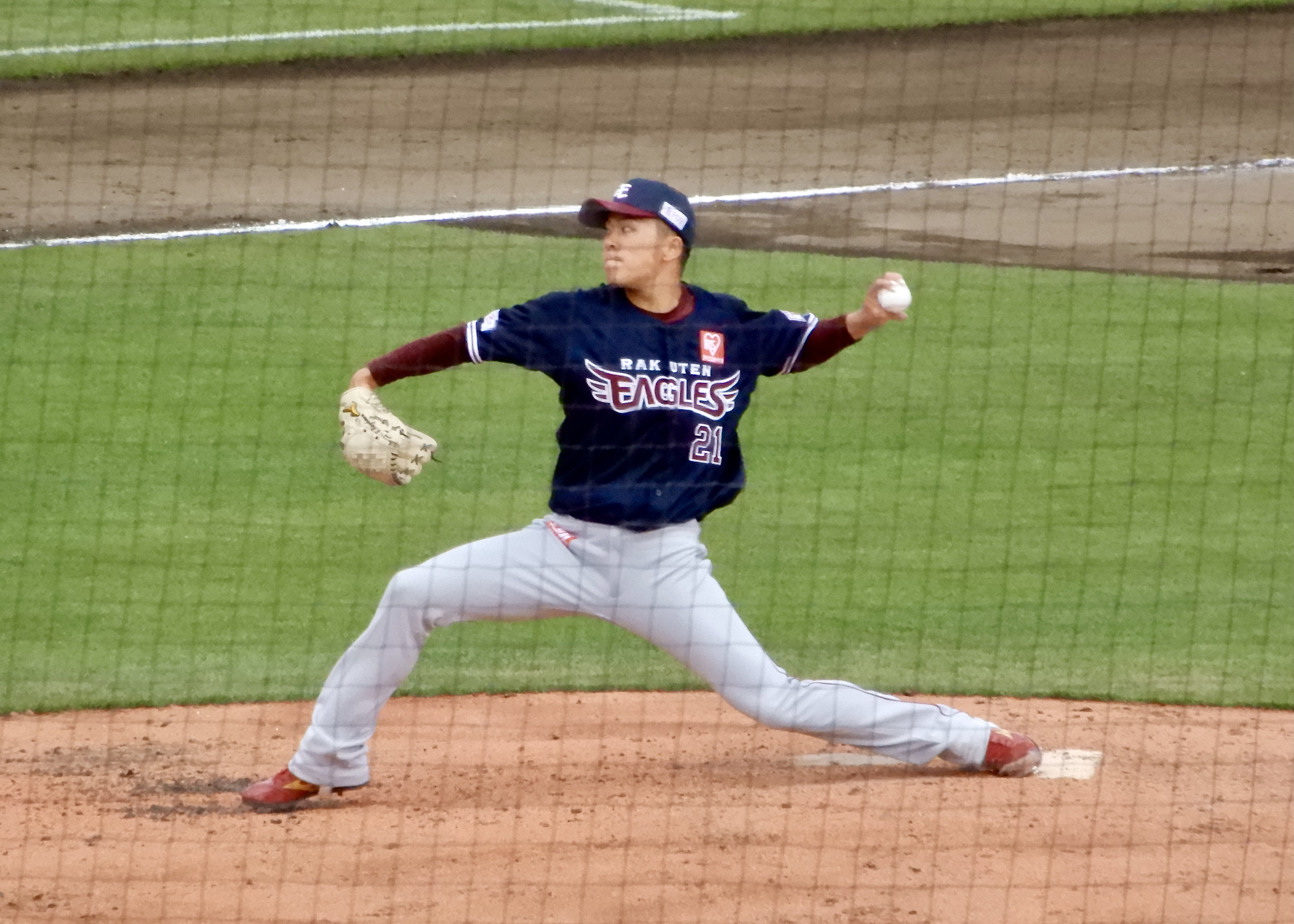

Tohoku Rakuten Golden Eagles – No. 21
- Pitcher
- Born: July 6, 1998 (age 27); Sanbu District, Chiba, Japan
- Bats: Left Throws: Left

NPB debut
- March 28, 2021, for the Tohoku Rakuten Golden Eagles

NPB statistics (through 2024 season)
- Win–loss record: 31–29
- Earned run average: 3.34
- Strikeouts: 451
- Stats at Baseball Reference

Teams
- Tohoku Rakuten Golden Eagles (2021–present)
Medals
Men's baseball
Representing Japan
WBSC Premier12
Silver medal – second place	2024	Team

Takahisa Hayakawa (早川 隆久, Hayakawa Takahisa; born July 6, 1998) is a professional Japanese baseball player. He plays pitcher for the Tohoku Rakuten Golden Eagles.
