= Masaya Nishigaki =

Japanese baseball player (born 1999)

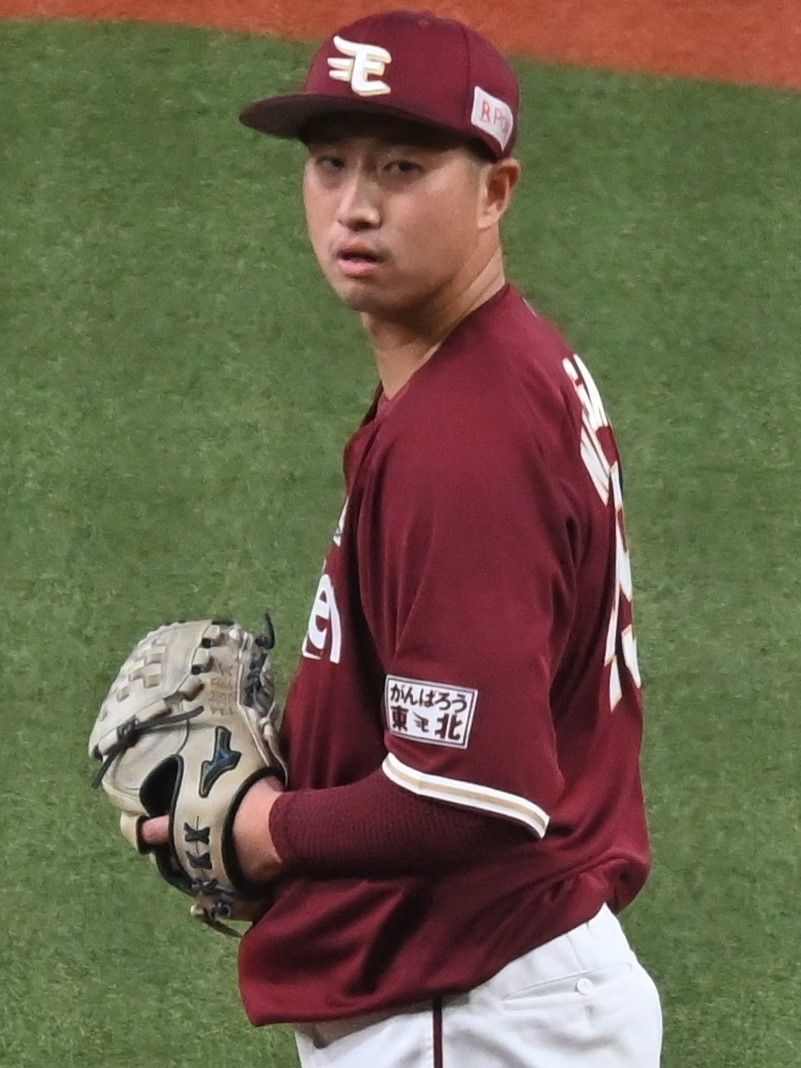

Tohoku Rakuten Golden Eagles – No. 49
- Pitcher
- Born: June 21, 1999 (age 26); Asago, Hyōgo, Japan
- Bats: Left Throws: Right

NPB debut
- March 25, 2022, for the Tohoku Rakuten Golden Eagles

Career statistics (through April 5, 2022)
- Win–loss record: 0–0
- Earned run average: 2.25
- Strikeouts: 2

Teams
- Tohoku Rakuten Golden Eagles (2022–present)

Masaya Nishigaki (西垣雅矢, Nishigaki Masaya; born June 21, 1999, in Asago, Hyōgo, Japan) is a professional Japanese baseball player. He is a pitcher for the Tohoku Rakuten Golden Eagles of Nippon Professional Baseball (NPB).
