= Masaru Fujii =

Japanese baseball player (born 1996)

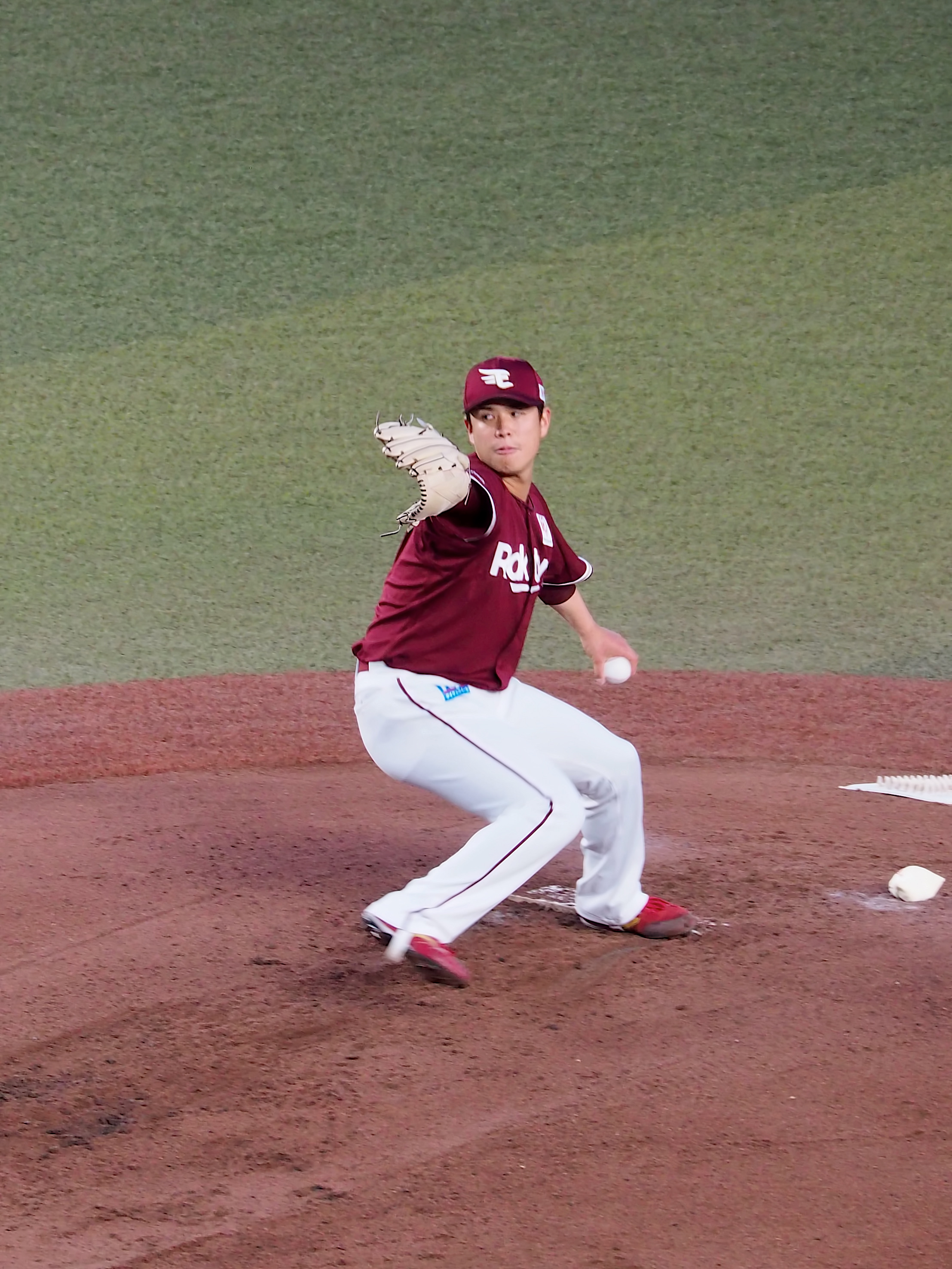

Tohoku Rakuten Golden Eagles – No. 47
- Pitcher
- Born: October 3, 1996 (age 30); Ebina, Kanagawa, Japan
- Bats: Left Throws: Left

NPB debut
- April 28, 2022, for the Tohoku Rakuten Golden Eagles

NPB statistics (through 2026 season)
- Win–loss record: 23–17
- Earned run average: 3.04
- Strikeouts: 193

Teams
- Tohoku Rakuten Golden Eagles (2021–present)

Career highlights and awards
- NPB All-Star (2024)

Masaru Fujii (藤井 聖, Fujii Masaru; born October 3, 1996) is a Japanese professional baseball pitcher for the Tohoku Rakuten Golden Eagles of Nippon Professional Baseball (NPB).

== Career ==
Fujii was drafted by the Tohoku Rakuten Golden Eagles in the 3rd round of the 2020 NPB draft. Fujii began his career in 2021 with Rakuten's farm team, but did not debut with the main club until 2022, during which he logged a 1–2 record and 3.38 ERA with 10 strikeouts across four appearances. Fujii made 10 appearances for the Eagles in 2023, recording a 2.29 ERA with 24 strikeouts across 35 1/3 innings pitched.

Fujii began the year pitching out of Rakuten's rotation, posting a 7–1 record and 2.36 ERA with 43 strikeouts over his first 13 games. He was subsequently named an All-Star for the first time in his career.

Fujii made 22 appearances for Rakuten during the 2025 season, compiling a 6–7 record and 3.20 ERA with 58 strikeouts across 109 2/3 innings pitched.
