= Tatsuki Koja =

Japanese baseball player (born 2001)

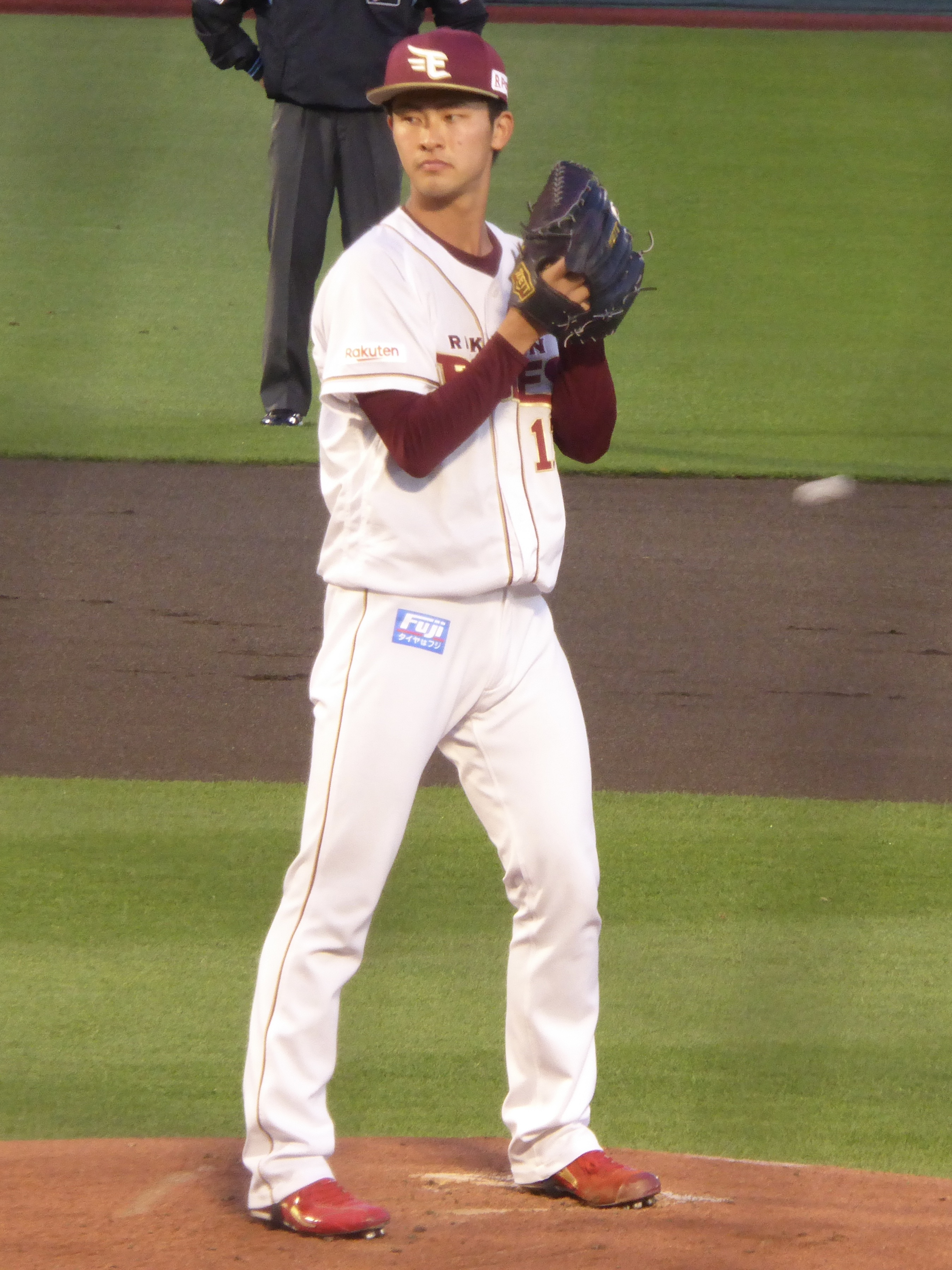

Tohoku Rakuten Golden Eagles – No. 17
- Pitcher
- Born: August 18, 2001 (age 24); Yokohama, Kanagawa, Japan
- Bats: Left Throws: Left

NPB debut
- May 25, 2024, for the Tohoku Rakuten Golden Eagles

Career statistics (through 2024 season)
- Win–loss record: 5-8
- Earned Run Average: 4.32
- Strikeouts: 58
- Saves: 0
- Holds: 0

Teams
- Tohoku Rakuten Golden Eagles (2024–present)

Tatsuki Koja (古謝 樹, Koja Tatsuki; born August 18, 2001) is a professional Japanese baseball player. He plays pitcher for the Tohoku Rakuten Golden Eagles.
