= Kosei Shoji =

Japanese baseball player (born 2000)

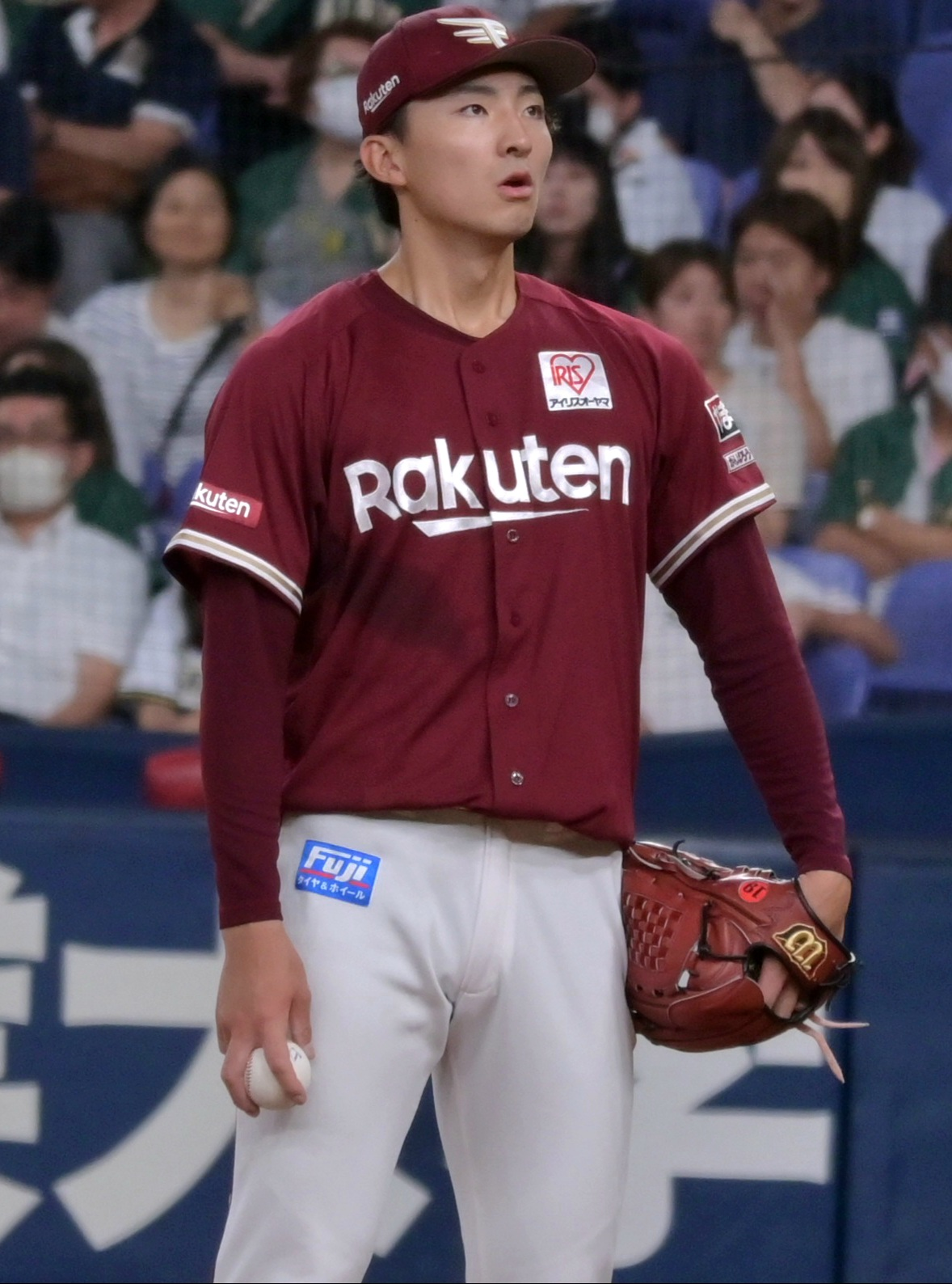

Tohoku Rakuten Golden Eagles – No. 19
- Pitcher
- Born: October 13, 2000 (age 25); Niigata, Niigata, Japan
- Bats: Right Throws: Right

NPB debut
- April 22, 2023, for the Tohoku Rakuten Golden Eagles

NPB statistics (through 2024 season)
- Win–loss record: 6-7
- ERA: 4.13
- Strikeouts: 119
- Saves: 0
- Holds: 0

Teams
- Tohoku Rakuten Golden Eagles (2023–present)

Kosei Shoji (荘司 康誠, Shoji Kosei; born October 13, 2000 in Niigata, Niigata, Japan) is a professional Japanese baseball player. He plays pitcher for the Tohoku Rakuten Golden Eagles.
