= Fumiya Kurokawa =

Japanese baseball player (born 2001)

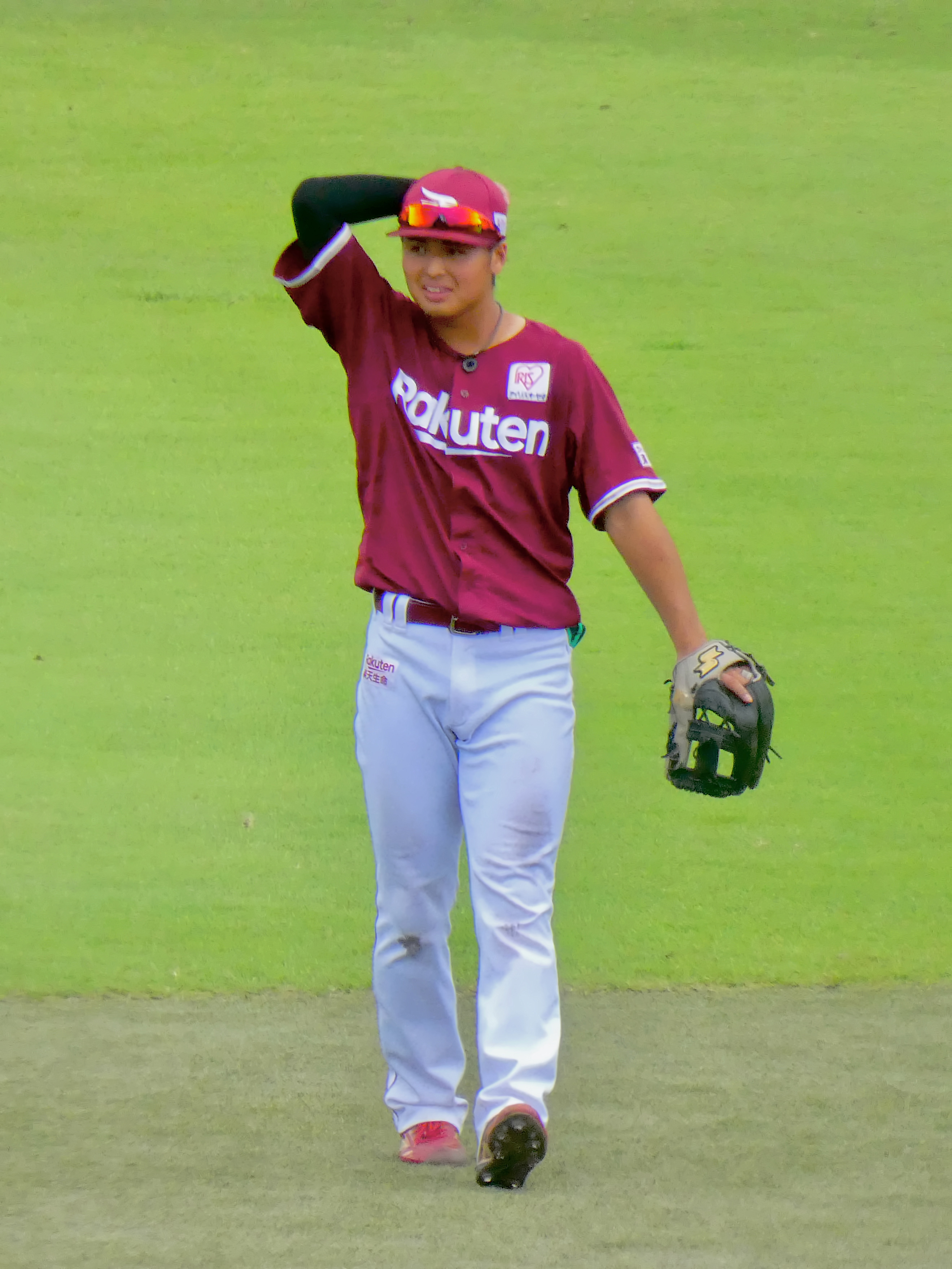

Tohoku Rakuten Golden Eagles – No. 24
- Infielder
- Born: April 17, 2001 (age 24); Kitakatsuragi District, Nara, Japan
- Bats: Left Throws: Right

NPB debut
- September 4, 2020, for the Tohoku Rakuten Golden Eagles

NPB statistics (through 2024 season)
- Batting average: .196
- Home runs: 3
- Runs batted in: 22

Teams
- Tohoku Rakuten Golden Eagles (2020–present)

Fumiya Kurokawa (黒川 史陽, Kurokawa Fumiya; born April 17, 2001) is a professional Japanese baseball player. He plays infielder for the Tohoku Rakuten Golden Eagles.
