= Hikaru Ohta =

Japanese baseball player (born 1996)

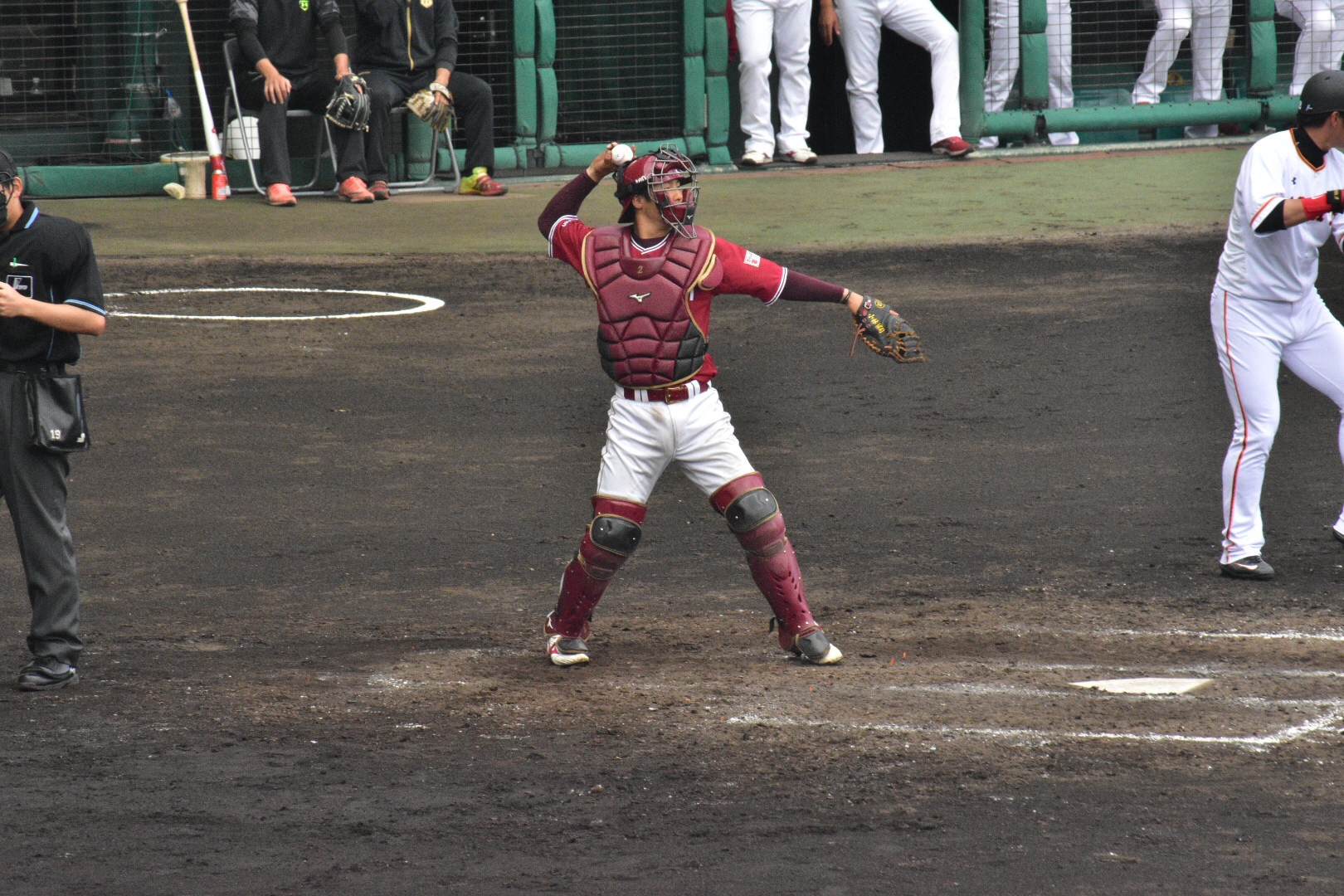

Tohoku Rakuten Golden Eagles – No. 2
- Catcher
- Born: October 14, 1996 (age 28); Kurashiki, Okayama, Japan
- Bats: Right Throws: Right

NPB debut
- June 7, 2019, for the Tohoku Rakuten Golden Eagles

NPB statistics (through 2023 season)
- Batting average: .211
- Home runs: 13
- Runs batted in: 77

Teams
- Tohoku Rakuten Golden Eagles (2019–present)

Hikaru Ohta (太田 光, Ohta Hikaru; born October 14, 1996) is a professional Japanese baseball player. He plays catcher for the Tohoku Rakuten Golden Eagles.
