= Taisei Tsurusaki =

Japanese baseball player (born 1997)

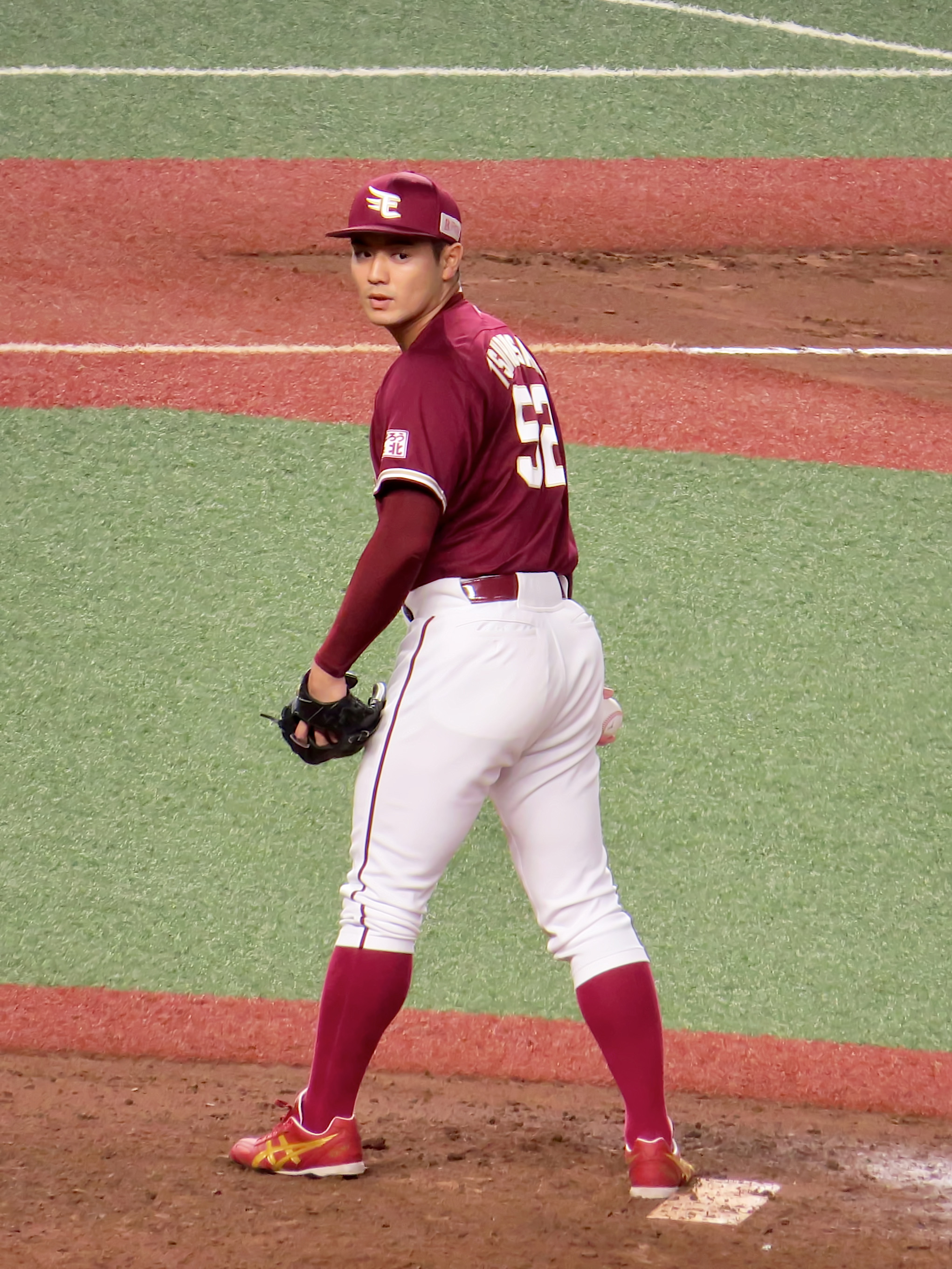
- Tsurusaki with the Tohoku Rakuten Golden Eagles

Tohoku Rakuten Golden Eagles – No. 52
- Pitcher
- Born: October 10, 1997 (age 28); Kamagaya, Chiba, Japan
- Bats: Right Throws: Right

NPB debut
- June 21, 2020, for the Tohoku Rakuten Golden Eagles

NPB statistics (through 2022 season)
- Win–loss record: 1-1
- ERA: 4.42
- Strikeouts: 38

Teams
- Tohoku Rakuten Golden Eagles (2020–present)

Taisei Tsurusaki (津留﨑 大成, born October 10, 1997) is a Japanese professional baseball pitcher for the Tohoku Rakuten Golden Eagles of Nippon Professional Baseball (NBP). He made his NPB debut in 2020.
