= Ryōta Takinaka =

Japanese baseball player (born 1994)

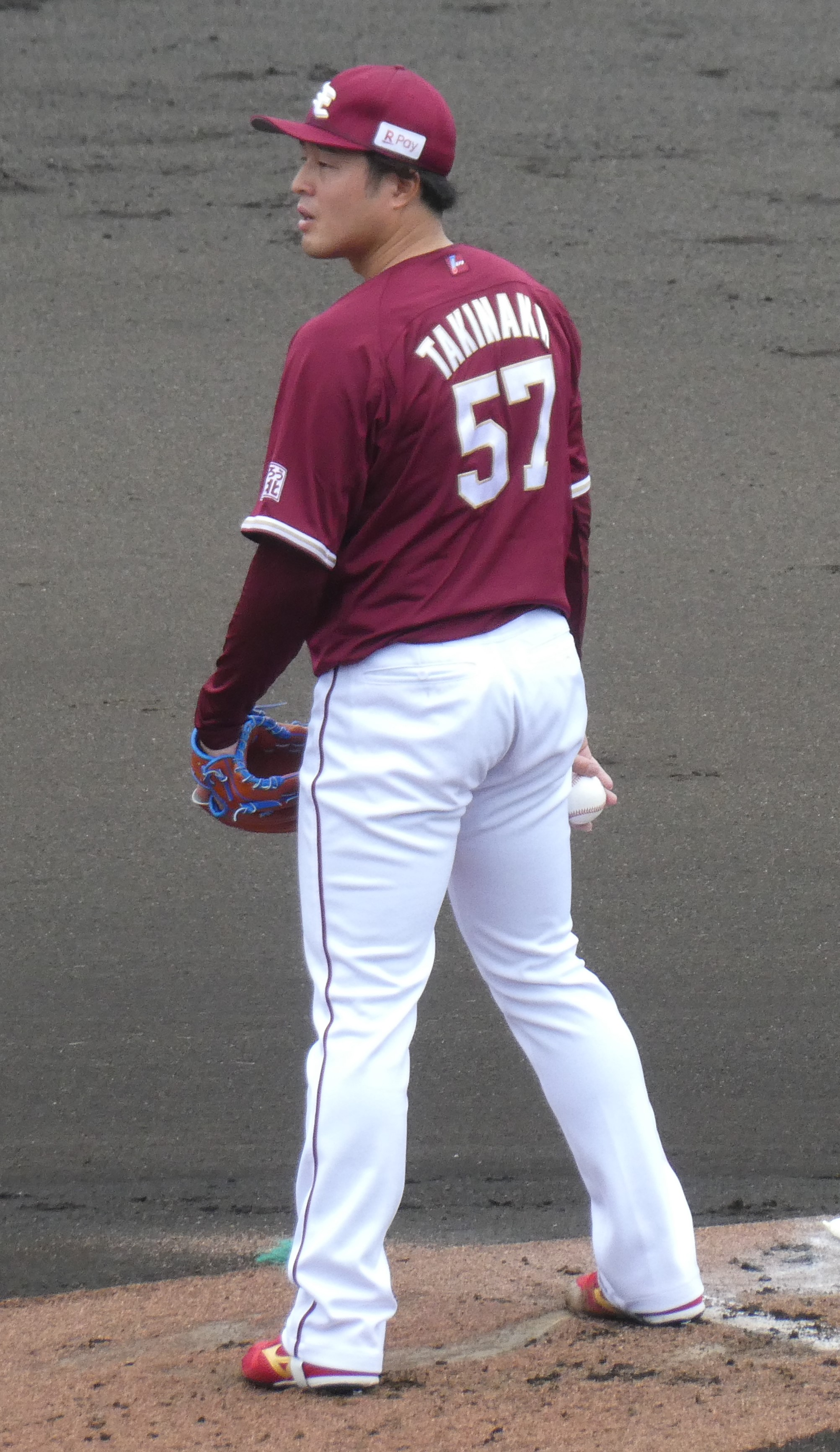

Tohoku Rakuten Golden Eagles – No. 57
- Pitcher
- Born: December 20, 1994 (age 30); Takashima, Shiga
- Bats: Right Throws: Right

NPB debut
- September 19, 2020, for the Tohoku Rakuten Golden Eagles

Career statistics (through March 31, 2022)
- Win–loss record: 12-6
- Earned Run Average: 3.14
- Strikeouts: 105

Teams
- Tohoku Rakuten Golden Eagles (2020-present)

Ryōta Takinaka (瀧中瞭太, Takinaka Ryōta; born December 20, 1994) is a Japanese professional baseball player. He is a pitcher for the Tohoku Rakuten Golden Eagles of Nippon Professional Baseball (NPB).
