= Taisei Yanagawa =

Japanese baseball player (born 2003)

Taisei Yanagawa 柳川 大晟

Hokkaido Nippon-Ham Fighters – No. 47
- Pitcher
- Born: August 21, 2003 (age 22); Hayami, Ōita, Japan
- Bats: Right Throws: Right

NPB debut
- May 26, 2024, for the Hokkaido Nippon-Ham Fighters

Career statistics (through 2025 season)
- Win–loss record: 3-4
- Earned Run Average: 2.20
- Strikeouts: 60
- Saves: 19
- Holds: 8

Teams
- Hokkaido Nippon-Ham Fighters (2022–present)

Taisei Yanagawa (柳川 大晟, Yanagawa Taisei; born August 21, 2003 in Hayami, Ōita, Japan) is a Japanese professional baseball pitcher for the Hokkaido Nippon-Ham Fighters of Nippon Professional Baseball (NPB).
