= Takahiro Norimoto =

Japanese baseball player (born 1990)

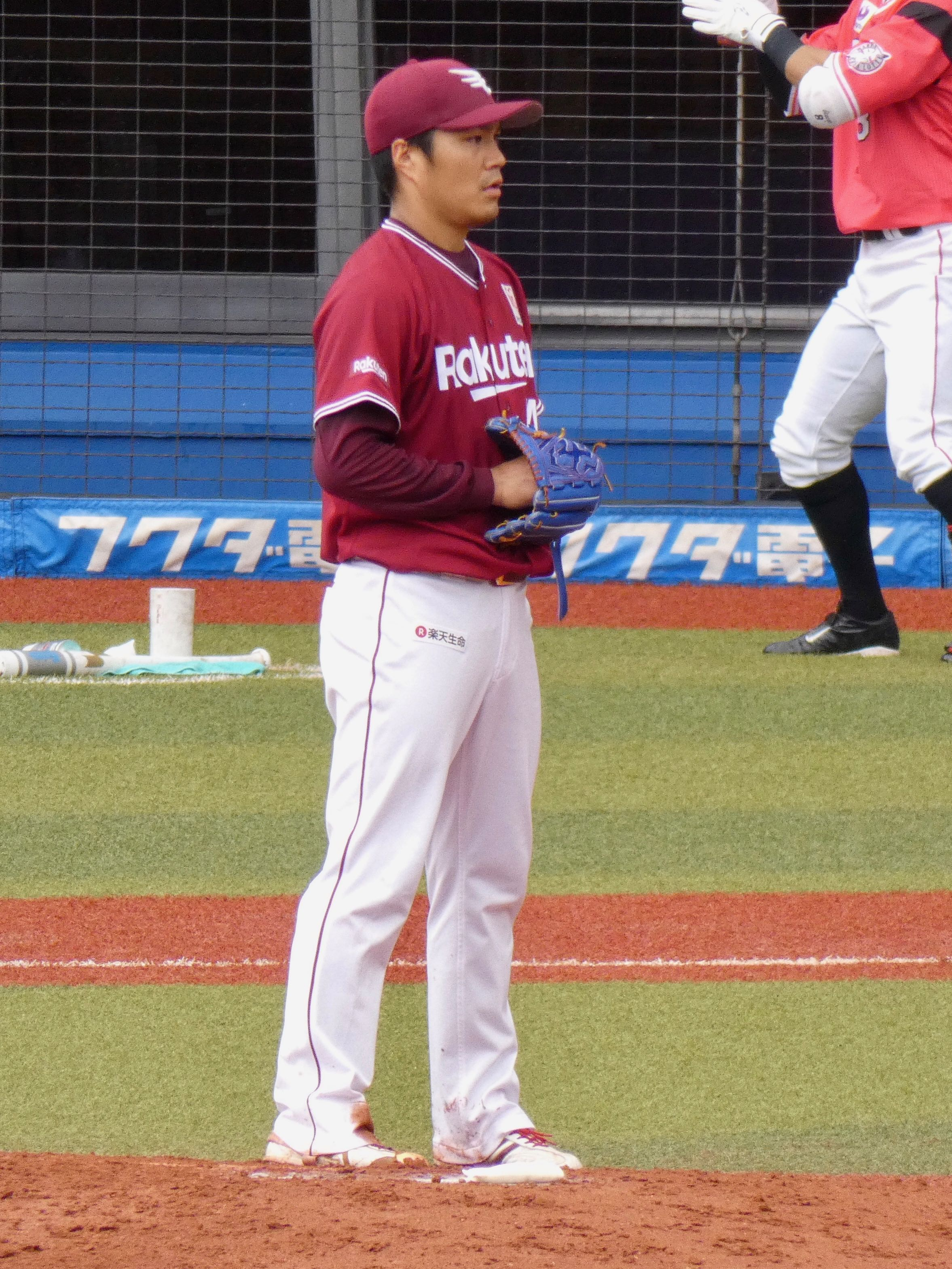
- Norimoto in 2018

Yomiuri Giants – No. 43
- Pitcher
- Born: December 17, 1990 (age 35); Taga, Japan
- Bats: Left Throws: Right

NPB debut
- March 29, 2013, for the Tohoku Rakuten Golden Eagles

NPB statistics (through 2025 season)
- Win–loss: 120–99
- Earned run average: 3.12
- Strikeouts: 1,804
- Stats at Baseball Reference

Teams
- Tohoku Rakuten Golden Eagles (2013–2025)

Career highlights and awards
- NPB: Pacific League Rookie of the Year (2013); Japan Series champion (2013); Golden Rookie Award (2013); Hochi Professional Sports Award (2013); Shiga Citizens Sports Award Special Award (2013); 5× Pacific League strikeout title (2014–2018); 6× NPB All-Star (2014, 2016, 2017, 2021, 2022, 2024); Commissioner's Special Award (2017); Interleague play PL Nippon Life Award Winner (2014)
Medals
Men's baseball
Representing Japan
2015 WBSC Premier12
Bronze medal – third place	2015 Tokyo	Team

Takahiro Norimoto (則本 昂大, Norimoto Takahiro; born December 17, 1990) is a Japanese professional baseball pitcher for the Yomiuri Giants of Nippon Professional Baseball (NPB). He has previously played in NPB for the Tohoku Rakuten Golden Eagles.

== Professional career ==
=== Tohoku Rakuten Golden Eagles ===
In 2013, Norimoto's rookie season, he pitched to a 15-8 win–loss record and a 3.34 earned run average. Norimoto won the Pacific League Rookie of the Year Award.

In 2015, Norimoto led the Pacific League in strikeouts for the second straight season, with 215. His 194 2/3 innings also led the league. He finished third in ERA with a 2.91 mark. Despite these achievements, Norimoto finished the season with a 10–11 record, his first losing campaign in his three years.

In 2024, Norimoto was named Rakuten's primary closer following Yuki Matsui's departure to Major League Baseball (MLB). On April 2, 2024, Norimoto earned his first career save. In 54 appearances for the team, he posted a 3-4 record and 3.46 ERA with 44 strikeouts and 32 saves over 52 innings of work.

Norimoto made 56 appearances for the Eagles during the 2025 campaign, compiling a 3-4 record and 3.05 ERA with 43 strikeouts and 16 saves across 56 innings pitched. Norimoto became an international free agent following the season.

=== Yomiuri Giants ===
On January 15, 2026, Norimoto signed a multi-year contract with the Yomiuri Giants of Nippon Professional Baseball.

== Samurai Japan ==
After the 2014 NPB season, Norimoto was named to the Samurai Japan national team that took on the MLB All-Stars in an exhibition series in Japan. In Game 3 of that series at the Tokyo Dome on November 15, Norimoto pitched 5 perfect innings and struck out 6 with just 60 pitches and earned the win in what would turn out to be a combined no-hitter by Samurai Japan. The MLB lineup featured six All-Stars but collected just four base runners, losing 4–0.

== Playing style ==
Norimoto is a 5 ft 10 in, 180 lb right-handed pitcher. With a three-quarters delivery he throws a fastball, a forkball, and a solid slider. He recorded a career-high 98 mph when he worked in relief.

He won five times strikeout titles, and posting a K/9 of 9.4 in his NPB career.
