= Sora Suzuki =

Japanese baseball player (born 1996)

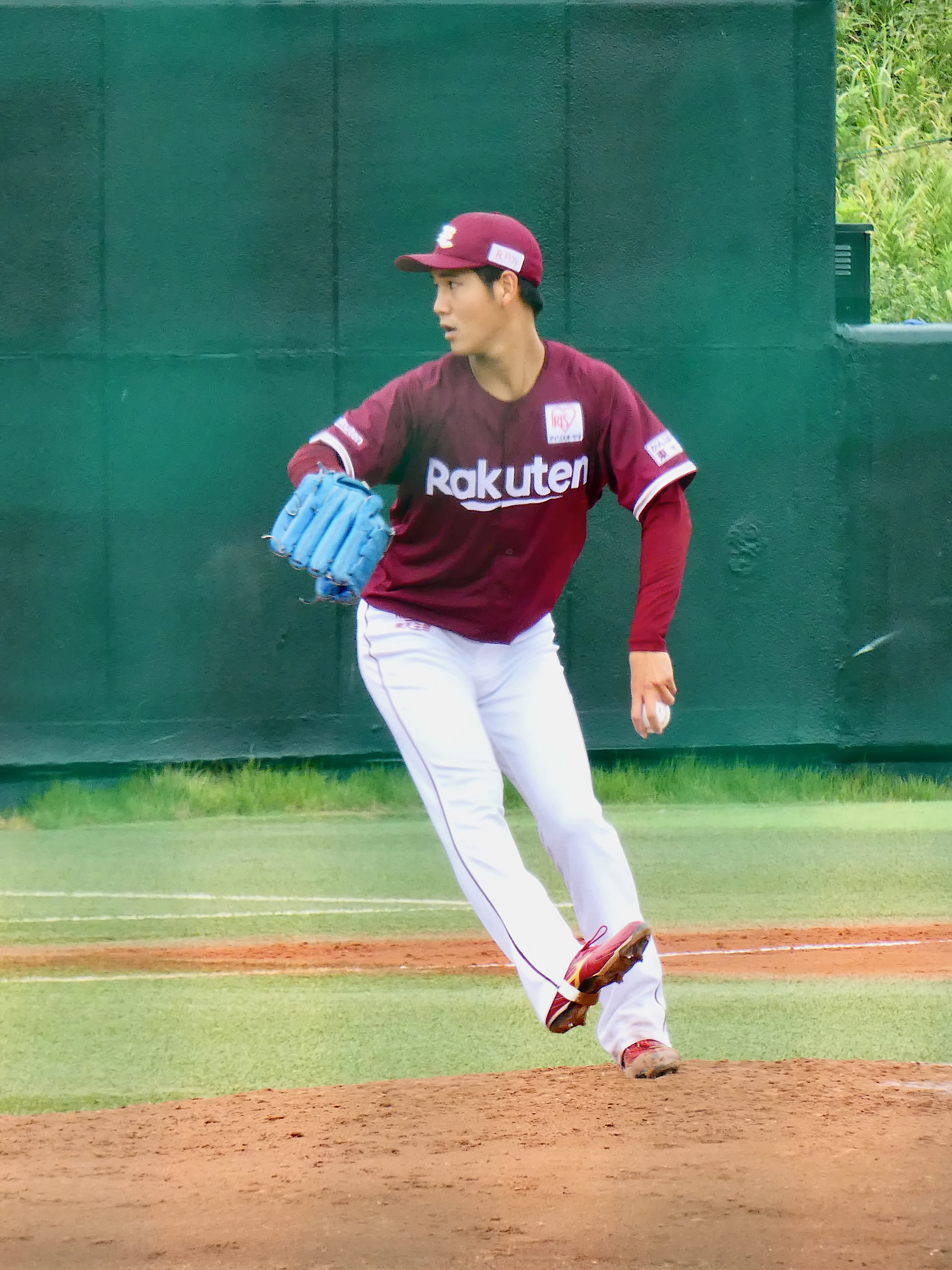
- Suzuki with the Tohoku Rakuten Golden Eagles

Tohoku Rakuten Golden Eagles – No. 56
- Pitcher
- Born: August 19, 1996 (age 29)
- Bats: Left Throws: Left

NPB debut
- September 15, 2020, for the Tohoku Rakuten Golden Eagles

NPB statistics (through 2024 season)
- Win–loss record: 4-4
- ERA: 2.91
- Strikeouts: 136
- Holds: 53
- Saves: 2
- Stats at Baseball Reference

Teams
- Tohoku Rakuten Golden Eagles (2020–present)
Medals
Men's baseball
Representing Japan
WBSC Premier12
Silver medal – second place	2024	Team

Sora Suzuki (鈴木 翔天, born August 19, 1996, in Asahi-ku, Yokohama, Kanagawa Prefecture) is a Japanese professional baseball pitcher for the Tohoku Rakuten Golden Eagles in Japan's Nippon Professional Baseball. He made his debut in 2020.
