= Daisuke Nakashima =

Japanese baseball player (born 2001)

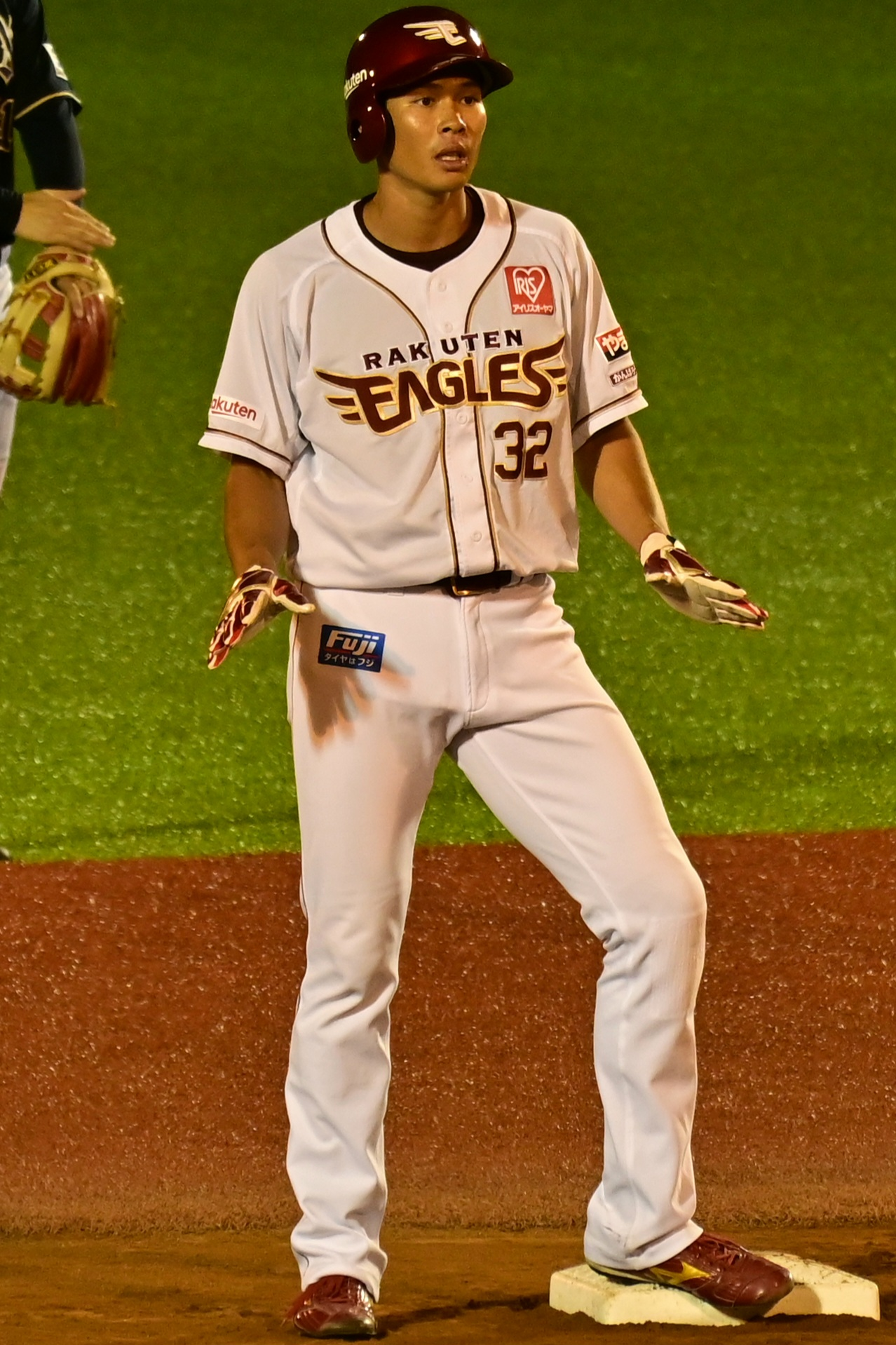

Tohoku Rakuten Golden Eagles – No. 32
- Outfielder
- Born: June 4, 2001 (age 24); Hidaka, Wakayama, Japan
- Bats: Left Throws: Right

NPB debut
- July 2, 2024, for the Tohoku Rakuten Golden Eagles

NPB statistics (through 2024 season)
- Batting average: .228
- Home runs: 1
- RBI: 10
- Hits: 28
- Stolen base: 1
- Sacrifice bunt: 0

Teams
- Tohoku Rakuten Golden Eagles (2024–present)

Daisuke Nakashima (中島 大輔, Nakashima Daisuke; born June 4, 2001) is a professional Japanese baseball player. He plays outfielder for the Tohoku Rakuten Golden Eagles.
