= Yukiya Itoh =

Japanese baseball player (born 1996)

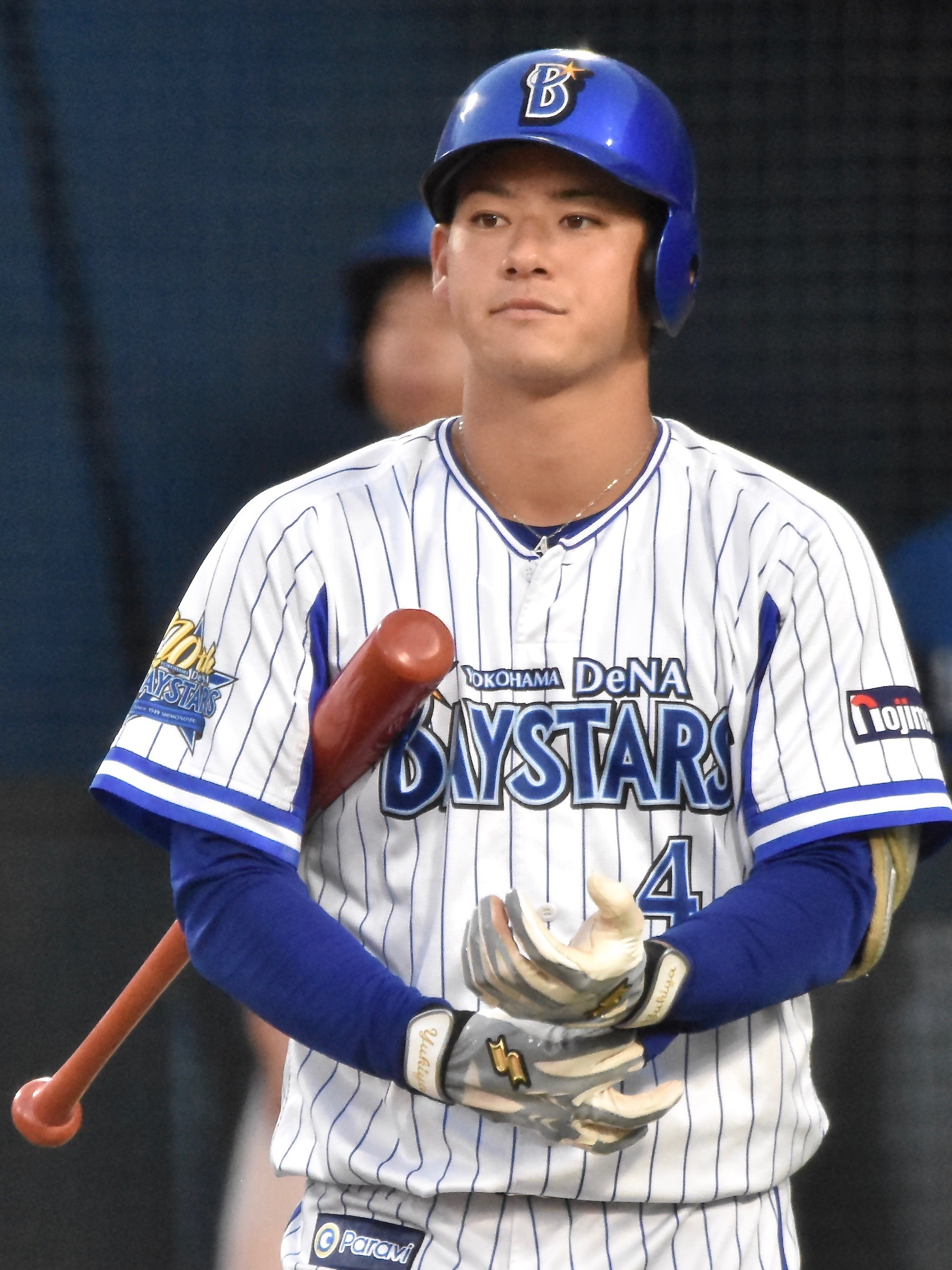
- Itoh with the Yokohama DeNA BayStars

Tohoku Rakuten Golden Eagles – No. 39
- Infielder
- Born: August 30, 1996 (age 28); Yokkaichi, Mie, Japan
- Bats: Right Throws: Right

NPB debut
- August 8, 2019, for the Yokohama DeNA BayStars

Career statistics (through 2024 season)
- Batting average: .245
- Hits: 96
- Home runs: 11
- RBIs: 34

Teams
- Yokohama DeNA BayStars (2019–2022); Tohoku Rakuten Golden Eagles (2022–present)

Yukiya Itoh (伊藤 裕季也, Itoh Yukiya; born August 30, 1996 in Yokkaichi, Mie, Japan) is a Japanese professional baseball infielder for the Tohoku Rakuten Golden Eagles of Nippon Professional Baseball (NPB). He has previously played in NPB for the Yokohama DeNA BayStars.

== Career ==
=== Yokohama DeNA BayStars ===
Itoh began his career with the Yokohama DeNA BayStars, making his NPB debut on August 8, 2019. He appeared in 21 games in his debut campaign, hitting .289/.333/.596 with 4 home runs and 7 RBI. After appearing in only 5 games during the COVID-19-affected 2020 season, Itoh only saw 3 games of action during the 2021 season, spending the majority of the year with the farm team. In 2022, Itoh played in 7 games for Yokohama, going 1-for-13.

=== Tohoku Rakuten Golden Eagles ===
On July 28, 2022, Itoh was traded to the Tohoku Rakuten Golden Eagles in exchange for Kohei Morihara. He made 3 appearances for Tohoku to close out the year, going hitless in 8 at-bats.
