= 2025 Tohoku Rakuten Golden Eagles season =

Professional sports season in Nippon Professional Baseball

2025 Tohoku Rakuten Golden Eagles
- 2025 "Tohoku Pride" logo
- League: Pacific League
- Ballpark: Rakuten Mobile Park Miyagi
- Record: 67–74–2 (.475), 21 GB
- League place: 4th
- Parent company: Rakuten
- President: Masayuki Morii
- General manager: Kazuhisa Ishii
- Manager: Hajime Miki
- Average attendance: 23,713

The 2025 Tohoku Rakuten Golden Eagles season was the 21st season of the Tohoku Rakuten Golden Eagles franchise. The Eagles played their home games at Rakuten Mobile Park Miyagi in the city of Sendai as members of Nippon Professional Baseball's Pacific League. The team was led by Hajime Miki in his first season in his second stint as team manager, and his second season overall.

== Regular season ==
=== Standings ===
2025 Pacific League regular season standings
Pos	Team	G	W	L	T	Pct.	GB	Home	Road
1	Fukuoka SoftBank Hawks^{†}	143	87	52	4	.626	—	44–24–3	43–28–1
2	Hokkaido Nippon-Ham Fighters*	143	83	57	3	.593	4½	43–28	40–29–3
3	Orix Buffaloes*	143	74	66	3	.529	13½	38–32–2	36–34–1
**4**	**Tohoku Rakuten Golden Eagles**	**143**	**67**	**74**	**2**	**.475**	**21**	**35–36–1**	**32–38–1**
5	Saitama Seibu Lions	143	63	77	3	.450	24½	35–34–2	28–43–1
6	Chiba Lotte Marines	143	56	84	3	.400	31½	33–38–1	23–46–2

^{†} League champion and advanced directly to the final stage of the Climax Series
* Advanced to the first stage of the Climax Series

=== Record vs. opponents ===
2025 record vs. opponents
Team	Buffaloes	Eagles	Fighters	Hawks	Lions	Marines	CL
Buffaloes	—	15–10	12–12–1	7–16−2	14–11	15–10	17–7
**Eagles**	**10–15**	—	**8–16–1**	**11–14**	**13–12**	**16–9**	**9–8–1**
Fighters	12–12–1	16–8–1	—	12–13	15–9–1	17–8	11–7
Hawks	16–7−2	14–11	13–12	—	17–8	15–9−1	12–5–1
Lions	11–14	12–13	9–15–1	8–17	—	13–10–2	10–8
Marines	10–15	9–16	8–17	9–15−1	10–13–2	—	10−8

=== Interleague ===
2025 regular season interleague standings
Pos	Team	G	W	L	T	Pct.	GB	Home	Road
1	Fukuoka SoftBank Hawks^{†}	18	12	5	1	.706	—	7–1–1	5–4
2	Hokkaido Nippon-Ham Fighters	18	11	7	0	.611	1½	6–3	5–4
3	Orix Buffaloes	18	11	7	0	.611	1½	7–2	4–5
4	Saitama Seibu Lions	18	10	8	0	.556	2½	7–2	3–6
5	Chiba Lotte Marines	18	10	8	0	.556	2½	7–2	3–6
**6**	**Tohoku Rakuten Golden Eagles**	**18**	**9**	**8**	**1**	**.529**	**3**	**5–4**	**4–4–1**
7	Hiroshima Toyo Carp	18	9	9	0	.500	3½	6–3	3–6
8	Hanshin Tigers	18	8	10	0	.444	4½	6–3	2–7
9	Chunichi Dragons	18	8	10	0	.444	4½	5–4	3–6
10	Yokohama DeNA BayStars	18	7	11	0	.389	5½	4–5	3–6
11	Yomiuri Giants	18	6	11	1	.353	6	5–4	1–7–1
12	Tokyo Yakult Swallows	18	5	12	1	.294	7	3–5−1	2–7

^{†} Interleague champion

=== Chihō ballparks ===
The Eagles hosted six home games outside of Rakuten Mobile Park Miyagi in 2025. Five were played at chihō, or "countryside", ballparks in the remaining five prefectures that make up Japan's Tōhoku region: Fukushima, Aomori, Yamagata, and Akita Prefectures. A sixth was played at the Tokyo Dome in Tokyo.

2025 Rakuten Eagles chihō ballparks
Ballpark	City	Prefecture
Kitagin Ballpark	Morioka	Iwate Prefecture
York Kaiseizan Stadium	Kōriyama	Fukushima Prefecture
Kirayaka Stadium	Yamagata	Yamagata Prefecture
Haruka Yume Stadium	Hirosaki	Aomori Prefecture
Komachi Stadium	Akita	Akita Prefecture
Tokyo Dome	Bunkyō	Tokyo

=== Opening Day starting roster ===
Friday, March 28, 2025, vs. Orix Buffaloes

2025 Rakuten Eagles Opening Day starting roster
Order	Player	Position
1	Hiroto Kobukata	Second baseman
2	Rui Muneyama	Shortstop
3	Yuya Ogo	Right fielder
4	Ryosuke Tatsumi	Center fielder
5	Hideto Asamura	First baseman
6	Itsuki Murabayashi	Third baseman
7	Yukiya Itoh	Designated hitter
8	Hikaru Ohta	Catcher
9	Kazuki Tanaka	Left fielder
—	Takahisa Hayakawa	Starting pitcher

=== Game log ===
2025 game log: 67–74–2 (Home: 35–36–1; Away: 32–38–1)
March/April: 13–13–0 (Home: 5–8–0; Away: 8–5–0)

#	Date	Opponent	Score	Win	Loss	Save	Stadium	Attendance	Record	Streak
1	March 28	@ Buffaloes	2–3	Machado (1–0)	**S. Suzuki** (0–1)	—	Kyocera Dome	36,079	0–1–0	L1
2	March 29	@ Buffaloes	5–4 (10)	**Norimoto** (1–0)	Yamada (0–1)	**Uchi** (1)	Kyocera Dome	32,121	1–1–0	W1
3	March 30	@ Buffaloes	1–6	Takashima (1–0)	**Karashima** (0–1)	—	Kyocera Dome	30,583	1–2–0	L1
—	April 1	Lions	Postponed (rain) – Makeup date: September 19				Rakuten Mobile Park	—	—	—
—	April 2	Lions	Postponed (rain) – Makeup date: October 4				Rakuten Mobile Park	—	—	—
4	April 3	Lions	4–1	**Kishi** (1–0)	Hada (0–1)	**Norimoto** (1)	Rakuten Mobile Park	23,114	2–2–0	W1
5	April 4	@ Marines	3–1	**Hayakawa** (1–0)	Tanaka (0–1)	**Norimoto** (2)	Zozo Marine Stadium	24,606	3–2–0	W2
6	April 5	@ Marines	0–1	Ojima (1–0)	**Ehara** (0–1)	Guerrero (1)	Zozo Marine Stadium	24,892	3–3–0	L1
7	April 6	@ Marines	5–0	**Koja** (1–0)	Voth (0–1)	—	Zozo Marine Stadium	26,375	4–3–0	W1
8	April 8	Fighters	2–5	Itoh (1–1)	**Norimoto** (1–1)	—	Rakuten Mobile Park	23,024	4–4–0	L1
9	April 9	Fighters	2–8	T. Katoh (1–0)	**Karashima** (0–2)	—	Rakuten Mobile Park	20,007	4–5–0	L2
10	April 10	Fighters	0–10	Kitayama (2–0)	**Kishi** (1–1)	—	Rakuten Mobile Park	20,722	4–6–0	L3
11	April 11	Buffaloes	1–4	D. Tajima (1–0)	**Hayakawa** (1–1)	Machado (4)	Rakuten Mobile Park	22,498	4–7–0	L4
12	April 12	Buffaloes	2–4	Kuri (2–0)	**Matsui** (0–1)	—	Rakuten Mobile Park	23,656	4–8–0	L5
13	April 13	Buffaloes	1–6	Miyagi (2–0)	**Koja** (1–1)	—	Rakuten Mobile Park	24,129	4–9–0	L6
14	April 15	@ Hawks	2–1 (10)	**Norimoto** (2–1)	Hernández (0–2)	**S. Suzuki** (1)	Mizuho PayPay Dome	30,162	5–9–0	W1
15	April 16	@ Hawks	6–2	**Takinaka** (1–0)	Uwasawa (1–1)	—	Mizuho PayPay Dome	30,232	6–9–0	W2
16	April 17	@ Hawks	4–3	**Matsui** (1–1)	Osuna (1–1)	**Norimoto** (3)	Mizuho PayPay Dome	30,521	7–9–0	W3
17	April 18	Marines	1–4	Voth (1–1)	**Hayakawa** (1–2)	Masuda (2)	Rakuten Mobile Park	22,667	7–10–0	L1
18	April 19	Marines	2–1	**Nishigaki** (1–0)	Ojima (1–2)	**Norimoto** (4)	Rakuten Mobile Park	24,931	8–10–0	W1
19	April 20	Marines	4–1	**Koja** (2–1)	Nishino (0–2)	**Norimoto** (5)	Rakuten Mobile Park	24,830	9–10–0	W2
20	April 22	@ Fighters	4–2	**Konno** (1–0)	Sugiura (1–1)	**Fujihira** (1)	Es Con Field	28,624	10–10–0	W3
21	April 23	@ Fighters	8–3	**Takinaka** (2–0)	Gu Lin (0–1)	—	Es Con Field	28,461	11–10–0	W4
22	April 25	Hawks	0–1	Arihara (1–3)	**Norimoto** (2–2)	Osuna (3)	Rakuten Mobile Park	23,693	11–11–0	L1
23	April 26	Hawks	6–3	**Uchi** (1–0)	Ohzeki (1–2)	**Fujihira** (2)	Rakuten Mobile Park	23,230	12–11–0	W1
24	April 27	Hawks	3–2 (11)	**Norimoto** (3–2)	Tsumori (1–1)	—	Rakuten Mobile Park	25,506	13–11–0	W2
25	April 29	@ Lions	1–7	K. Takahashi (1–2)	**Koja** (2–2)	—	Belluna Dome	27,624	13–12–0	L1
26	April 30	@ Lions	1–3	Sugai (3–1)	**Fujii** (0–1)	Taira (6)	Belluna Dome	18,629	13–13–0	L2

May: 9–13–1 (Home: 5–5–1; Away: 4–8–0)

#	Date	Opponent	Score	Win	Loss	Save	Stadium	Attendance	Record	Streak
27	May 1	@ Lions	1–2 (10)	Hada (1–1)	**Fujihira** (0–1)	—	Belluna Dome	19,543	13–14–0	L3
—	May 2	Buffaloes	Postponed (rain) – Makeup date: October 5				Rakuten Mobile Park	—	—	—
28	May 3	Buffaloes	0–7	Sotani (2–2)	**Hayakawa** (1–3)	—	Rakuten Mobile Park	25,300	13–15–0	L4
29	May 4	Buffaloes	14–3	**Kishi** (2–1)	Takashima (2–1)	—	Rakuten Mobile Park	25,600	14–15–0	W1
30	May 5	@ Marines	2–1	**Nishigaki** (2–0)	H. Tanaka (2–2)	**S. Suzuki** (2)	Zozo Marine Stadium	29,612	15–15–0	W2
—	May 6	@ Marines	Postponed (rain) – Makeup date: September 30				Zozo Marine Stadium	—	—	—
31	May 7	@ Marines	3–7	Takano (1–0)	**Fujii** (0–2)	—	Zozo Marine Stadium	25,127	15–16–0	L1
32	May 9	@ Fighters	1–2	Kanemura (3–2)	**Takinaka** (2–1)	—	Es Con Field	27,826	15–17–0	L2
33	May 10	@ Fighters	1–2	T. Yamamoto (1–0)	**Matsui** (1–2)	Tanaka	Es Con Field	29,280	15–18–0	L3
34	May 11	@ Fighters	0–4	Gu Lin (2–1)	**Kishi** (2–2)	—	Es Con Field	30,375	15–19–0	L4
35	May 13	Marines	4–3	**Nishiguchi** (1–0)	Guerrero (1–2)	—	Rakuten Mobile Park	23,521	16–19–0	W1
36	May 14	Marines	4–0	**Howard** (1–0)	Taneichi (2–3)	—	Rakuten Mobile Park	24,353	17–19–0	W2
37	May 15	Marines	2–5	Sammons (1–0)	**Hayakawa** (1–4)	Kimura (1)	Tokyo Dome	40,629	17–20–0	L1
38	May 16	@ Hawks	5–1	**Fujii** (1–2)	Arihara (2–4)	—	Mizuho PayPay Dome	39,511	18–20–0	W1
39	May 17	@ Hawks	1–2	Ohzeki (3–3)	**Matsui** (1–3)	Osuna (6)	Mizuho PayPay Dome	40,060	18–21–0	L1
40	May 18	@ Hawks	1–2 (12)	Fujii (2–1)	**Konno** (1–1)	—	Mizuho PayPay Dome	40,116	18–22–0	L2
41	May 20	Lions	0–1	Sugai (4–2)	**Takinaka** (2–2)	Taira (11)	Kitagin Ballpark	12,509	18–23–0	L3
42	May 22	Lions	2–1	**Nishiguchi** (2–0)	Wingenter (0–2)	—	Rakuten Mobile Park	24,010	19–23–0	W1
43	May 23	Fighters	0–1	Kanemura (4–2)	**Hayakawa** (1–5)	—	Rakuten Mobile Park	25,594	19–24–0	L1
44	May 24	Fighters	2–1	**Shoji** (1–0)	Yamasaki (2–2)	**S. Suzuki** (3)	Rakuten Mobile Park	25,162	20–24–0	W1
45	May 25	Fighters	1−1	Game tied after 12 innings			Rakuten Mobile Park	25,117	20–24–1	T1
46	May 27	@ Lions	3–1	**Kajiya** (1–0)	Wingenter (0–3)	**S. Suzuki** (4)		11,281	21–24–1	W1
47	May 28	@ Lions	0–6	Y. Watanabe (3–3)	**Takinaka** (2–3)	—	Belluna Dome	24,465	21–25–1	L1
48	May 29	@ Lions	6–3	**Nishigaki** (3–0)	Takeuchi (1–1)	**Fujihira** (3)	Belluna Dome	22,503	22–25–1	W1
49	May 30	Hawks	2–4	Sugiyama (1–2)	**S. Suzuki** (0–2)	Osuna (8)	Rakuten Mobile Park	24,604	22–26–1	L1
—	May 31	Hawks	Postponed (rain) – Makeup date: September 26				Rakuten Mobile Park	—	—	—

June: 11–10–1 (Home: 6–4–0; Away: 5–6–1)

#	Date	Opponent	Score	Win	Loss	Save	Stadium	Attendance	Record	Streak
50	June 1	Hawks	3–0	**Fujii** (2–2)	H. Matsumoto (1–1)	**Fujihira** (4)	Rakuten Mobile Park	25,012	23–26–1	W1
51	June 3	BayStars	3–6	K. Azuma (6–2)	**Yajure** (0–1)	Irie (12)	Rakuten Mobile Park	23,802	23–27–1	L1
52	June 4	BayStars	3–1	**Uchi** (2–0)	Jackson (5–2)	Kajiya (1)	Rakuten Mobile Park	24,285	24–27–1	W1
53	June 5	BayStars	0–5	Kay (5–2)	**Takinaka** (2–4)	—	York Kaiseizan Stadium	12,349	24–28–1	L1
54	June 6	@ Giants	2–0	**Howard** (2–0)	Akahoshi (4–4)	**Norimoto** (6)	Tokyo Dome	41,812	25–28–1	W1
55	June 7	@ Giants	0–2	Griffin (4–0)	**Fujihira** (0–2)	Martínez (21)	Tokyo Dome	41,926	25–29–1	L1
56	June 8	@ Giants	0–5	Togo (2–4)	**Fujii** (2–3)	—	Tokyo Dome	42,041	25–30–1	L2
57	June 10	Dragons	1–3	Muller (2–3)	**Yajure** (0–2)	Matsuyama (23)	Kirayaka Stadium	9,806	25–31–1	L3
58	June 11	Dragons	5–8	Wakui (3–2)	**Uchi** (2–1)	Matsuyama (24)	Rakuten Mobile Park	24,413	25–32–1	L4
59	June 12	Dragons	4–0	**Kishi** (3–2)	Miura (2–2)	—	Rakuten Mobile Park	24,979	26–32–1	W1
60	June 13	Tigers	3–2	**Howard** (3–0)	Murakami (7–2)	**Norimoto** (7)	Rakuten Mobile Park	25,628	27–32–1	W2
61	June 14	Tigers	5–4 (10)	**S. Watanabe** (1–0)	Iwasada (2–1)	—	Rakuten Mobile Park	25,739	28–32–1	W3
62	June 15	Tigers	3–2 (12)	**Uchi** (3–1)	Yuasa (2–2)	—	Rakuten Mobile Park	26,134	29–32–1	W4
63	June 17	@ Swallows	4−4	Game tied after 12 innings			Meiji Jingu Stadium	28,672	29–32–2	T1
64	June 18	@ Swallows	6–2	**Takinaka** (3–4)	Lambert (1–6)	—	Meiji Jingu Stadium	26,639	30–32–2	W1
65	June 19	@ Swallows	3–1	**Kishi** (4–2)	Ávila (1–4)	S. Watanabe (1)	Meiji Jingu Stadium	25,595	31–32–2	W2
66	June 20	@ Carp	4–0	**Hayakawa** (2–5)	Morishita (5–6)	—	Mazda Stadium	28,806	32–32–2	W3
67	June 21	@ Carp	3–8	Tokoda (7–5)	**Uchi** (3–2)	—	Mazda Stadium	32,175	32–33–2	L1
68	June 22	@ Carp	2–5	Nakazaki (2–1)	**Fujii** (2–4)	Kuribayashi (9)	Mazda Stadium	30,980	32–34–2	L2
69	June 27	@ Buffaloes	2–10	Kuri (6–4)	**Hayakawa** (2–6)	—	Kyocera Dome	29,610	32–35–2	L3
70	June 28	@ Buffaloes	3–7	Saiki (1–0)	**Yajure** (0–3)	—	Kyocera Dome	30,340	32–36–2	L4
71	June 29	@ Buffaloes	4–2	**Fujii** (3–4)	Azuma (1–2)	**Norimoto** (8)	Kyocera Dome	31,005	33–36–2	W1

July: 11–10–0 (Home: 5–5–0; Away: 6–5–0)

#	Date	Opponent	Score	Win	Loss	Save	Stadium	Attendance	Record	Streak
72	July 1	Marines	6–0	**Howard** (4–0)	Voth (2–4)	—	Rakuten Mobile Park	24,024	34–36–2	W2
73	July 2	Marines	3–6	Kimura (2–0)	**Kishi** (4–3)	Nakamori (5)	Rakuten Mobile Park	24,941	34–37–2	L1
74	July 4	@ Fighters	1–7	Itoh (9–4)	**Hayakawa** (2–7)	—	Es Con Field	30,142	34–38–2	L2
75	July 5	@ Fighters	1–12	Hosono (2–1)	**Takinaka** (3–5)	—	Es Con Field	32,011	34–39–2	L3
76	July 6	@ Fighters	6–8	Tamai (1–2)	**Kajiya** (1–1)	Yanagawa (1)	Es Con Field	32,005	34–40–2	L4
77	July 8	@ Lions	7–2	**Yajure** (1–3)	Y. Watanabe (5–5)	—	Belluna Dome	18,242	35–40–2	W1
78	July 9	@ Lions	2–0	**Shibata** (1–0)	Sugai (5–4)	**Norimoto** (9)	Belluna Dome	20,615	36–40–2	W2
79	July 10	@ Lions	1–5	K. Takahashi (3–4)	**Kishi** (4–4)	—	Belluna Dome	17,331	36–41–2	L1
80	July 11	Hawks	3–0	**Koja** (3–2)	Moinelo (7–2)	**Norimoto** (10)	Rakuten Mobile Park	23,496	37–41–2	W1
81	July 12	Hawks	7–0	**Takinaka** (4–5)	Uwasawa (6–6)	—	Rakuten Mobile Park	24,646	38–41–2	W2
82	July 13	Hawks	3–5	Y. Maeda (1–0)	**Uchi** (3–3)	—	Rakuten Mobile Park	24,075	38–42–2	L1
83	July 15	@ Buffaloes	7–6 (10)	**Nishigaki** (4–0)	Perdomo (2–2)	**Norimoto** (11)	Kyocera Dome	24,319	39–42–2	W1
84	July 16	@ Buffaloes	0–1	D. Tajima (5–4)	**Norimoto** (3–3)	—	Kyocera Dome	23,504	39–43–2	L1
—	July 17	@ Buffaloes	Postponed (rain) – Makeup date: September 29				Hotto Motto Field	—	—	—
85	July 19	Fighters	2–5	Itoh (10–5)	**Koja** (3–3)	Yanagawa (5)	Rakuten Mobile Park	24,534	39–44–2	L2
86	July 20	Fighters	2–4	T. Katoh (7–3)	**Uchi** (3–4)	Yanagawa (6)	Rakuten Mobile Park	25,071	39–45–2	L3
87	July 21	Fighters	0–2	Hosono (3–1)	**Takinaka** (4–6)	Yanagawa (7)	Rakuten Mobile Park	26,103	39–46–2	L4
All-Star Break: PL defeats the CL, 2–0
88	July 26	Lions	3–2	**Yajure** (2–3)	Yoza (3–3)	**Norimoto** (12)	Rakuten Mobile Park	25,025	40–46–2	W1
89	July 27	Lions	4–1	**Fujii** (4–4)	Y. Watanabe (5–7)	**Norimoto** (13)	Rakuten Mobile Park	23,586	41–46–2	W2
90	July 29	@ Marines	2–1	**Koja** (4–3)	Taneichi (3–7)	**Norimoto** (14)	Zozo Marine Stadium	24,821	42–46–2	W3
91	July 30	@ Marines	8–5	**Kishi** (5–4)	Shu. Ishikawa (3–7)	**Norimoto** (15)	Zozo Marine Stadium	25,559	43–46–2	W4
92	July 31	@ Marines	6–5	**Nishiguchi** (3–0)	Masuda (1–3)	**Fujihira** (5)	Tokyo Dome	41,164	44–46–2	W5

August: 12–13–0 (Home: 6–5–0; Away: 6–8–0)

#	Date	Opponent	Score	Win	Loss	Save	Stadium	Attendance	Record	Streak
93	August 1	@ Hawks	1–3	Uwasawa (7–6)	**Takinaka** (4–7)	Sugiyama (14)	Mizuho PayPay Dome	40,142	44–47–2	L1
94	August 2	@ Hawks	1–3	Arihara (9–5)	**Yajure** (2–4)	Fujii (2)	Mizuho PayPay Dome	40,142	44–48–2	L2
95	August 3	@ Hawks	1–8	Ohzeki (9–3)	**Fujii** (4–5)	—	Mizuho PayPay Dome	40,142	44–49–2	L3
96	August 5	Buffaloes	1–0 (11)	**Miyamori** (1–0)	Yamazaki (1–1)	—	Rakuten Mobile Park	23,152	45–49–2	W1
97	August 6	Buffaloes	2–1	**S. Suzuki** (1–2)	Kuri (7–7)	**Norimoto** (16)	Rakuten Mobile Park	24,273	46–49–2	W2
98	August 7	Buffaloes	7–3	**Fujihira** (1–2)	Perdomo (2–3)	—	Rakuten Mobile Park	24,419	47–49–2	W3
99	August 9	@ Lions	4–9	Sumida (9–6)	**Takinaka** (4–8)	—	Belluna Dome	25,196	47–50–2	L1
100	August 10	@ Lions	9–4	**S. Suzuki** (2–2)	Y. Nakamura (0–1)	—	Belluna Dome	27,387	48–50–2	W1
101	August 11	@ Lions	4–5 (10)	Taira (3–1)	**S. Suzuki** (2–3)	—	Belluna Dome	26,603	48–51–2	L1
102	August 13	@ Buffaloes	7–4	**Koja** (5–3)	Sotani (8–6)	**Fujihira** (6)	Kyocera Dome	32,942	49–51–2	W1
103	August 14	@ Buffaloes	5–1	**Fujii** (5–5)	D. Tajima (5–6)	—	Kyocera Dome	30,191	50–51–2	W2
104	August 15	Fighters	3–1	**Shoji** (2–0)	Kitayama (7–4)	**S. Suzuki** (5)	Rakuten Mobile Park	25,537	51–51–2	W3
105	August 16	Fighters	5–9	T. Katoh (8–5)	**Uchi** (3–5)	—	Rakuten Mobile Park	25,142	51–52–2	L1
106	August 17	Fighters	5–7	Itoh (12–5)	**Yajure** (2–5)	Yanagawa (9)	Rakuten Mobile Park	24,451	51–53–2	L2
107	August 19	@ Marines	4–3 (10)	**Fujihira** (2–2)	Hiroike (0–3)	**Nishiguchi** (1)	Zozo Marine Stadium	22,315	52–53–2	W1
108	August 20	@ Marines	3–5	Sawada (1–0)	**Koja** (5–4)	Yokoyama (1)	Zozo Marine Stadium	23,247	52–54–2	L1
109	August 21	@ Marines	10–12	Yoshikawa (1–0)	**Takinaka** (4–9)	Sawada (1)	Zozo Marine Stadium	20,141	52–55–2	L2
110	August 22	Buffaloes	3–2	**Shoji** (3–0)	Kuri (8–8)	**Fujihira** (7)	Rakuten Mobile Park	23,739	53–55–2	W1
111	August 23	Buffaloes	6–8	Kawase (1–1)	**Konno** (1–2)	Machado (21)	Rakuten Mobile Park	25,503	53–56–2	L1
112	August 24	Buffaloes	2–3	Espinoza (4–6)	**Norimoto** (3–4)	Machado (22)	Rakuten Mobile Park	24,639	53–57–2	L2
113	August 26	Hawks	10–3	**Kishi** (6–4)	Ohzeki (11–4)	—	Haruka Yume Stadium	13,263	54–57–2	W1
114	August 27	Hawks	1–3	Ohtsu (3–2)	**Koja** (5–5)	Sugiyama (21)	Komachi Stadium	11,107	54–58–2	L1
115	August 29	@ Fighters	0–5	Kitayama (8–4)	**Shoji** (3–1)	—	Es Con Field	31,011	54–59–2	L2
116	August 30	@ Fighters	6–2	**Kajiya** (2–1)	T. Katoh (8–6)	—	Es Con Field	33,582	55–59–2	W1
117	August 31	@ Fighters	1–0 (11)	**Nishigaki** (5–0)	Sugiura (1–2)	**Sung** (1)	Es Con Field	33,022	56–59–2	W2

September/October: 11–15–0 (Home: 8–9–0; Away: 3–6–0)

#	Date	Opponent	Score	Win	Loss	Save	Stadium	Attendance	Record	Streak
118	September 2	Lions	0–2	Imai (9–5)	**Kishi** (6–5)	—	Rakuten Mobile Park	24,215	56–60–2	L1
119	September 3	Lions	6–11	Yoza (6–3)	**Hayakawa** (2–8)	—	Rakuten Mobile Park	24,379	56–61–2	L2
120	September 5	@ Hawks	0–11	Ohtsu (4–2)	**Koja** (5–6)	—	Mizuho PayPay Dome	38,967	56–62–2	L3
121	September 6	@ Hawks	1–2	Arihara (11–8)	**Shoji** (3–2)	Sugiyama (24)	Mizuho PayPay Dome	40,142	56–63–2	L4
122	September 7	@ Hawks	4–2	**Fujii** (6–5)	H. Matsumoto (6–5)	**Fujihira** (8)	Mizuho PayPay Dome	40,133	57–63–2	W1
123	September 9	Lions	6–5 (11)	**Nishigaki** (6–0)	Kuroki (1–1)	—	Rakuten Mobile Park	23,544	58–63–2	W1
—	September 10	Lions	Postponed (weather) – Makeup date: October 3				Rakuten Mobile Park	—	—	—
124	September 12	Marines	6–3	**Koja** (6–6)	Voth (2–9)	**Fujihira** (9)	Rakuten Mobile Park	24,867	59–63–2	W2
125	September 13	Marines	4–6	Sammons (5–5)	**Shoji** (3–3)	Yokoyama (7)	Rakuten Mobile Park	23,701	59–64–2	L1
126	September 14	Marines	5–1	**Sung** (5–1)	Ojima (8–8)	—	Rakuten Mobile Park	25,149	60–64–2	W1
127	September 15	Marines	5–4 (12)	**Ehara** (1–1)	Hirohata (0–1)	—	Rakuten Mobile Park	25,580	61–64–2	W2
128	September 17	Fighters	3–2 (11)	**Nishigaki** (7–0)	Saito (0–2)	—	Rakuten Mobile Park	24,058	62–64–2	W3
129	September 18	@ Marines	0–7	Taneichi (8–7)	**Kishi** (6–6)	—	Zozo Marine Stadium	25,130	62–65–2	L1
130	September 19	Lions	1–4	K. Takahashi (8–7)	**Koja** (6–7)	Taira (28)	Rakuten Mobile Park	24,047	62–66–2	L2
131	September 20	Lions	2–1	**Shoji** (4–3)	Y. Watanabe (6–9)	**Fujihira** (10)	Rakuten Mobile Park	23,739	63–66–2	W1
132	September 21	Lions	2–8	Sumida (10–9)	**Fujii** (6–6)	—	Rakuten Mobile Park	23,739	63–67–2	L1
133	September 23	@ Fighters	7–0	**Howard** (5–0)	Sun (0–2)	—	Es Con Field	36,162	64–67–2	W1
134	September 24	Hawks	3–8	Moinelo (12–3)	**Yajure** (2–6)	—	Rakuten Mobile Park	23,576	64–68–2	L1
135	September 25	Hawks	0–6	Ohzeki (13–5)	**S. Suzuki** (2–4)	—	Rakuten Mobile Park	23,366	64–69–2	L2
136	September 26	Hawks	3–4	Uwasawa (12–6)	**Nishigaki** (7–1)	Sugiyama (29)	Rakuten Mobile Park	25,380	64–70–2	L3
137	September 27	@ Buffaloes	0–2	Yamashita (1–0)	**Shoji** (4–4)	Machado (28)	Kyocera Dome	27,850	64–71–2	L4
138	September 28	@ Buffaloes	5–10	Miyagi (7–3)	**Fujii** (6–7)	—	Kyocera Dome	28,879	64–72–2	L5
139	September 29	@ Buffaloes	0–4	Kuri (11–8)	**Howard** (5–1)	—	Kyocera Dome	18,142	64–73–2	L6
140	September 30	@ Marines	2–1	**Tai** (1–0)	Takano (5–3)	**Fujihira** (11)	Zozo Marine Stadium	27,347	65–73–2	W1
141	October 3	Lions	7–6	**Hinata** (1–0)	Taira (4–2)	—	Rakuten Mobile Park	23,641	66–73–2	W2
142	October 4	Lions	3–2	**Koja** (7–7)	K. Takahashi (8–9)	**Fujihira** (11)	Rakuten Mobile Park	25,732	67–73–2	W3
143	October 5	Buffaloes	1–2 (11)	Yamaoka (5–3)	**Nishiguchi** (3–1)	Katayama (1)	Rakuten Mobile Park	26,022	67–74–2	L1

Win | Loss | Tie | Postponement | = Interleague play
**Bold** = Eagles team member

== Roster ==
2025 Tohoku Rakuten Golden Eagles
Roster
Pitchers: 11 Takayuki Kishi; 14 Takahiro Norimoto; 15 Spencer Howard; 17 Tatsuki Koja; 19 Kosei Shoji; 20 Nik Turley; 21 Takahisa Hayakawa; 22 Ryuji Komago; 26 Haruto Nakagomi; 31 Shota Watanabe; 40 Masahiro Ehara; 41 Ren Kajiya; 43 Sung Chia-hao; 45 Tomotaka Matsui; 46 Shoma Fujihira; 47 Masaru Fujii; 49 Masaya Nishigaki; 52 Taisei Tsurusaki; 53 Haruto Sakai; 54 Naoki Hinata; 56 Sora Suzuki; 57 Ryota Takinaka; 58 Wataru Karashima; 59 Katsutoshi Tai; 61 Takuma Matsuda; 62 Naoto Nishiguchi; 64 Yuki Hayashi; 66 Ryuta Konno; 67 Seiya Ouchi; 69 Seiryu Uchi; 71 Daichi Shibata; 72 Satoshi Miyamori; 89 Miguel Yajure	Catchers: 2 Hikaru Ohta; 44 Takaya Tanaka; 65 Kengo Horiuchi; 70 Tsuyoshi Ishihara; Infielders: 0 Hiroto Kobukata; 1 Rui Muneyama; 3 Hideto Asamura; 4 Toshiki Abe; 7 Daichi Suzuki; 9 Luke Voit; 23 Maikel Franco; 24 Fumiya Kurokawa; 39 Yukiya Itoh; 48 Yoshiaki Watanabe; 63 Daiki Irie; 66 Itsuki Murabayashi; 73 Kotaro Komori; 75 Yang Po-Hsiang	Outfielders: 8 Ryosuke Tatsumi; 12 Oscar González; 25 Kazuki Tanaka; 27 Takero Okajima; 32 Daisuke Nakashima; 35 Hiroaki Shimauchi; 36 Tsubasa Yoshino; 50 Atsuki Mutoh; 51 Yuya Ogo; 78 Soshi Yoshino	Manager: 88 Hajime Miki; Coaches: 98 Hiroshi Watanabe (Batting); 76 Tatsuya Shimozono (Batting); 93 Taketoshi Goto (Batting); 80 Takashi Ishii (Pitching); 91 Yuya Kubo (Pitching); 96 Masahiko Tanaka (Battery); 86 Tatsuya Shiokawa (Infield defense/base running); 99 Shinichi Kawana (Outfield defense/base running); 95 Ryosuke Morioka (Batting/assistant fielding)

== Player statistics ==
=== Batting ===
2025 Tohoku Rakuten Golden Eagles batting statistics
Player	G	AB	R	H	2B	3B	HR	RBI	SB	BB	K	AVG	OBP	SLG	TB
Toshiki Abe	43	105	11	23	5	1	3	8	1	22	31	.219	.352	.371	39
Hideto Asamura	96	331	27	79	13	1	9	34	1	51	81	.239	.350	.366	121
Maikel Franco	101	317	21	75	9	0	7	32	0	24	65	.237	.288	.331	105
Masaru Fujii	22	2	0	0	0	0	0	0	0	0	1	.000	.000	.000	0
Oscar González^{†}	53	201	18	46	5	1	4	19	0	4	37	.229	.250	.323	65
Takahisa Hayakawa	12	3	0	0	0	0	0	0	0	0	2	.000	.000	.000	0
Kengo Horiuchi	76	168	16	43	3	1	3	18	1	17	39	.256	.323	.339	57
Spencer Howard	9	3	0	0	0	0	0	0	0	0	2	.000	.000	.000	0
Daiki Irie	4	10	0	1	0	0	0	2	0	0	3	.100	.100	.100	1
Tsuyoshi Ishihara	31	32	1	3	0	0	0	3	0	3	12	.094	.171	.094	3
Yukiya Itoh	51	117	7	25	8	1	1	7	2	9	34	.214	.273	.325	38
Takayuki Kishi	19	1	0	0	0	0	0	0	0	0	1	.000	.000	.000	0
Hiroto Kobukata	124	299	36	65	5	2	1	14	28	40	65	.217	.311	.258	77
Kohtaro Komori	33	76	8	15	1	0	1	3	5	2	21	.197	.225	.250	19
Fumiya Kurokawa	83	301	32	90	8	1	4	33	1	35	56	.299	.372	.372	112
Tomotaka Matsui	13	1	0	0	0	0	0	0	0	0	1	.000	.000	.000	0
Rui Muneyama	122	430	32	112	19	3	3	27	7	20	82	.260	.289	.340	146
Itsuki Murabayashi	137	513	41	144	14	0	3	51	6	28	102	.281	.320	.326	167
Atsuki Mutoh	62	108	21	22	3	2	0	10	3	14	31	.204	.302	.269	29
Daisuke Nakashima	124	462	51	123	11	5	6	31	22	17	75	.266	.294	.351	162
Yuya Ogo	90	173	18	30	7	2	2	12	11	16	54	.173	.245	.272	47
Hikaru Ohta	111	188	14	33	7	2	1	12	0	23	47	.176	.281	.250	47
Seiya Ouchi	2	1	0	0	0	0	0	0	0	0	1	.000	.000	.000	0
Takero Okajima	1	1	0	1	0	0	0	0	0	0	0	1.00	1.00	1.00	1
Hiroaki Shimauchi	5	10	0	0	0	0	0	0	0	1	3	.000	.091	.000	0
Daichi Suzuki	93	172	13	41	3	2	2	23	1	13	29	.238	.330	.314	54
Ryota Takinaka	15	0	2	0	0	0	0	0	0	3	0		1.00		0
Kazuki Tanaka	19	18	5	1	0	0	0	1	1	0	8	.056	.056	.056	1
Takaya Tanaka	12	3	0	1	0	0	0	0	0	1	2	.333	.500	.333	1
Ryosuke Tatsumi	114	367	36	88	12	2	7	32	20	40	91	.240	.325	.341	125
Seiryu Uchi	25	1	0	0	0	0	0	0	0	0	1	.000	.000	.000	0
Luke Voit^{†}	67	243	29	73	9	0	13	39	0	27	59	.300	.384	.498	121
Yoshiaki Watanabe	75	147	7	41	4	0	0	19	0	12	17	.279	.321	.306	45
Miguel Yajure	14	2	0	0	0	0	0	0	0	0	2	.000	.000	.000	0
Yang Po-Hsiang	2	2	0	1	0	0	0	0	0	0	1	.500	.500	.500	1
Soshi Yoshino	5	13	0	3	0	0	0	2	0	0	2	.231	.231	.231	3
Tsubasa Yoshino	2	3	0	0	0	0	0	0	0	0	2	.000	.000	.000	0
Total：37 players	143	4,824	446	1,179	146	26	70	432	110	422	1,030	.244	.310	.329	1,587

^{†}Denotes player joined the team mid-season. Stats reflect time with the Eagles only.
Bold/italics denotes best in the league

=== Pitching ===
2025 Tohoku Rakuten Golden Eagles pitching statistics
Player	W	L	ERA	G	GS	SV	IP	H	R	ER	BB	K
Masahiro Ehara	1	1	3.45	30	0	0	31.1	35	14	12	21	18
Shoma Fujihira	2	2	2.11	62	0	12	59.2	45	16	14	20	66
Masaru Fujii	6	7	3.20	22	22	0	109.2	121	46	39	43	58
Takahisa Hayakawa	2	8	4.35	12	12	0	68.1	67	35	33	20	62
Yuki Hayashi	0	0	0.00	1	0	0	1.1	0	0	0	1	3
Naoki Hinata	1	0	0.00	1	0	0	1	0	0	0	0	2
Spencer Howard	5	1	2.22	9	9	0	48.2	42	13	12	11	36
Ren Kajiya	2	1	3.50	54	0	1	43.2	41	18	17	19	34
Wataru Karashima	0	2	10.5	2	2	0	6	15	7	7	1	1
Takayuki Kishi	6	6	4.38	19	19	0	109	125	54	53	22	55
Tatsuki Koja	7	7	3.70	19	18	0	107	118	48	44	27	76
Ryuji Komago	0	0	0.00	1	0	0	1.2	2	0	0	0	3
Ryuta Konno	1	2	3.61	42	1	0	42.1	33	17	17	18	22
Takuma Matsuda	0	0	0.00	1	0	0	1	0	0	0	1	0
Tomotaka Matsui	1	3	6.00	13	1	0	27	31	18	18	19	25
Satoshi Miyamori	1	0	10.5	10	0	0	12	18	14	14	8	9
Haruto Nakagomi	0	0	5.40	7	0	0	6.2	6	4	4	6	3
Masaya Nishigaki	7	1	1.96	63	0	0	59.2	39	14	13	22	64
Naoto Nishiguchi	3	1	1.07	52	0	1	50.2	29	6	6	13	70
Takahiro Norimoto	3	4	3.05	56	1	16	56	60	19	19	20	43
Seiya Ouchi	0	0	2.00	2	2	0	9	5	2	2	5	6
Haruto Sakai	0	0	1.80	1	1	0	5	4	1	1	1	5
Daichi Shibata	1	0	2.08	6	0	0	8.2	8	2	2	6	6
Kosei Shoji	4	4	3.07	13	13	0	76.1	65	26	26	25	70
Sung Chia-hao	1	0	3.72	10	0	1	9.2	10	4	4	2	5
Sora Suzuki	2	4	2.36	46	0	5	42	33	12	11	15	52
Katsutoshi Tai	1	0	0.00	6	0	0	6.1	7	1	0	3	14
Ryota Takinaka	4	9	3.44	15	15	0	83.2	83	41	32	21	50
Taisei Tsurusaki	0	0	3.62	17	0	0	27.1	30	14	11	7	26
Nik Turley	0	0	6.75	2	0	0	1.1	2	1	1	1	1
Seiryu Uchi	3	5	2.92	25	13	1	83.1	83	30	27	23	42
Shota Watanabe	1	0	3.86	26	0	1	25.2	29	11	11	14	20
Miguel Yajure	2	6	4.48	14	14	0	64.1	80	38	32	23	30
Total: 33 players	67	74	3.37	143	143	38	1,285	1,266	526	481	438	977

Bold/italics denotes best in the league

== Awards and honors ==
Best Nine Award

- Rui Muneyama - shortstop
- Itsuki Murabayashi - third baseman

Mitsui Golden Glove Award

- Itsuki Murabayashi - third baseman
- Ryosuke Tatsumi - outfielder

All-Star Series selections

- Naoto Nishiguchi - pitcher
- Rui Muneyama - shortstop
- Itsuki Murabayashi - infielder

All-Star Game Fighting Spirit Award

- Rui Muneyama - Game 2

SKY PerfecTV! Sayonara Award

- Yuya Ogo - September/October (September 15)

== Farm team ==
2025 Eastern League regular season standings
Pos	Team	G	W	L	T	Pct.	GB	Home	Road
1	Yomiuri Giants^{†}	126	80	44	2	.645	—	36–22–2	44–22
2	Saitama Seibu Lions	121	69	49	3	.585	8	38–19–1	31–30–2
3	Chiba Lotte Marines	121	64	55	2	.538	13½	29–28–1	35–27–1
4	Hokkaido Nippon-Ham Fighters	117	60	55	2	.522	15½	32–28–1	28–27–1
5	Tohoku Rakuten Golden Eagles	127	62	63	2	.496	18½	35–27–1	27–36–1
6	Yokohama DeNA BayStars	130	57	71	2	.445	25	29–35–1	28–36–1
7	Oisix Niigata Albirex	121	47	73	1	.392	31	28–34	19–39–1
8	Tokyo Yakult Swallows	123	45	76	2	.372	33½	21–41–1	24–35–1

^{†} League champion

== Nippon Professional Baseball draft ==
2025 Tohoku Rakuten Golden Eagles draft selections
Round	Name	Position	Affiliation	Signed?
1	Sota Fujiwara	Pitcher	Hanazono University	Yes
2	Tatsuki Ito	Pitcher	Waseda University	Yes
3	Akira Shigenaga	Infielder	Chuo University	Yes
4	Toshiya Osakae	Catcher	Ishikawa High School	Yes
5	Taisei Ito	Pitcher	Reimei High School	Yes
6	Ryu Kutani	Pitcher	Oji Holdings	Yes
7	Shoya Sakaue	Outfielder	Kindai University	Yes
Development players
1	Daita Horomura	Outfielder	Toyama GRN Thunderbirds	Yes
2	Shion Otsubo	Outfielder	Ishikawa Million Stars	Yes
3	Takuma Nakazawa	Pitcher	Hakuoh University	Yes
4	Kyosuke Kaneko	Infielder	Kanagawa University	Yes
5	Taiga Shimahara	Catcher	Ehime Mandarin Pirates	Yes
