= EBaseball: Pro Spirit 2026 =

2026 video game

eBaseball: Pro Spirit 2026 プロ野球スピリッツ2026
- Developer: Konami Digital Entertainment
- Publisher: Konami Digital Entertainment
- Series: Professional Baseball Spirits
- Engine: eBaseball Engine (Unreal Engine 5)
- Platforms: PlayStation 5; Microsoft Windows
- Release: WW: July 16, 2026; AS: July 16, 2026; JP: July 16, 2026
- Genre: Sports (baseball)
- Modes: Single-player; Multiplayer

eBaseball: Pro Spirit 2026, also known as Professional Baseball Spirits 2026 (プロ野球スピリッツ2026, Puro Yakyū Supirittsu 2026) (Note: only in Japan and select Asian countries including Hong Kong, South Korea and Taiwan.), is a baseball simulation video game developed and released worldwide by Konami Digital Entertainment on July 16, 2026 for the PlayStation 5 and PC. The first of the eBaseball/Professional Baseball Spirits (PBS) series to have a global release, the game features the Nippon Professional Baseball for the 2026 season and the 2026 World Baseball Classic.

== Overview ==
This is the second game of the series, after Professional Baseball Spirits 2024-2025 to be developed with Konami's proprietary Unreal Engine 5-based "eBaseball Engine". With the incorporation of 3D scanning and impulse recording of stadiums, the game offers highly realistic graphics and atmosphere. Furthermore, the game features dynamic weather effects, affecting the field of play and giving additional gameplay depth.

In addition, the game also features license for the 2026 World Baseball Classic, marking the tournament's first licensed appearance in the eBaseball/Professional Baseball Spirits (PBS) series in 17 years (Note: on the home console.) since Pro Yakyū Spirits 6 in 2009. Past championship teams of Samurai Japan are also featured in the game, along with the team participating in the 2026 WBC among others.

== Featured mode ==
=== 2026 World Baseball Classic ===
In its first licensed appearance eBaseball/PBS home console title in 17 years, the World Baseball Classic mode features:

- Tournament mode: the player can compete as one of the national teams in the 2026 World Baseball Classic (WBC), making it out of pool play and battling in the knock-out stage for the world championship.
- Scenario mode: the player is put in situations to relive real-life moments in each of all 47 games of the 2026 WBC.
- All participating players of the 2026 WBC, including the MLBPA-licensed such as Shohei Ohtani, Aaron Judge, Jung-hoo Lee, Ronald Acuña Jr. và Vladimir Guerrero Jr. In additon, the mode also features LoanDepot Park, home of the Miami Marlins and the hosting ballpark of the championship game.
- A team editor, enabling the player to play in WBC with a customized national team or a team consisting of originally created players.

Due to restrictions on distribution of the World Baseball Classic license, which is non-exclusively shared with MLB The Show 26, the WBC mode is only available in Japan and select Asian countries.

=== Pennant Race ===
- For the first time in the series, this franchise management mode feature the "Active Player draft" (現役ドラフト), a mechanism similar to Major League Baseball's Rule 5 draft implemented in the NPB since 2022.

=== Hakkyū no Kiseki ===
In this mode, the player is put in the shoes of a high school baseball manager in Japan, with the task of building and fielding their school's club to qualify and compete at the Kōshien national tournaments (Spring and Summer).

- Players can choose to field their team during game by managing tactical decisions, or manually controlling the team in select moments during or throughout the game.
- In addition to reflecting rule changes in the Japanese high school baseball rulebook of 2026 which allows for the use of the designated hitter (DH), the mode introduces the so-called "Ohtani rule", in which a starting pitcher who also comes to bat as the DH can remain in the game as the DH after being relieved on the mound.

== Cast ==
=== Cover athletes ===
- Shohei Ohtani (Samurai Japan)
- Teruaki Satō (Hanshin Tigers)
- Katsuki Azuma (Yokohama DeNA BayStars)
- Kaito Kozono (Hiroshima Toyo Carp)
- Shinya Matsuyama (Chunichi Dragons)
- Sōma Uchiyama (Tokyo Yakult Swallows)
- Iori Yamasaki (Yomiuri Giants)
- Kōtarō Kiyomiya (Hokkaido Nippon-Ham Fighters)
- Liván Moinelo (Fukuoka SoftBank Hawks)
- Kotaro Kurebayashi (Orix Buffaloes)
- Mishō Nishikawa (Chiba Lotte Marines)
- Chihiro Sumida (Saitama Seibu Lions)
- Shōma Fujihira (Tohoku Rakuten Golden Eagles)

=== Commentary ===
==== Japanese ====
- Play-by-play
  - Taisuke Mitsuhashi
- Color
  - Norihiro Akahoshi
  - Tomoya Satozaki
  - Kimiyasu Kudō
  - Kenshin Kawakami

==== English ====
- Play-by-play
  - Josh Lewin

== Release ==
EBaseball: Pro Spirits 2026 was released on July 16, 2026, in 200 countries and regions worldwide, becoming the first eBaseball/PBS title to receive a global release.
