= Ryūta Konno =

Japanese baseball player (born 1995)

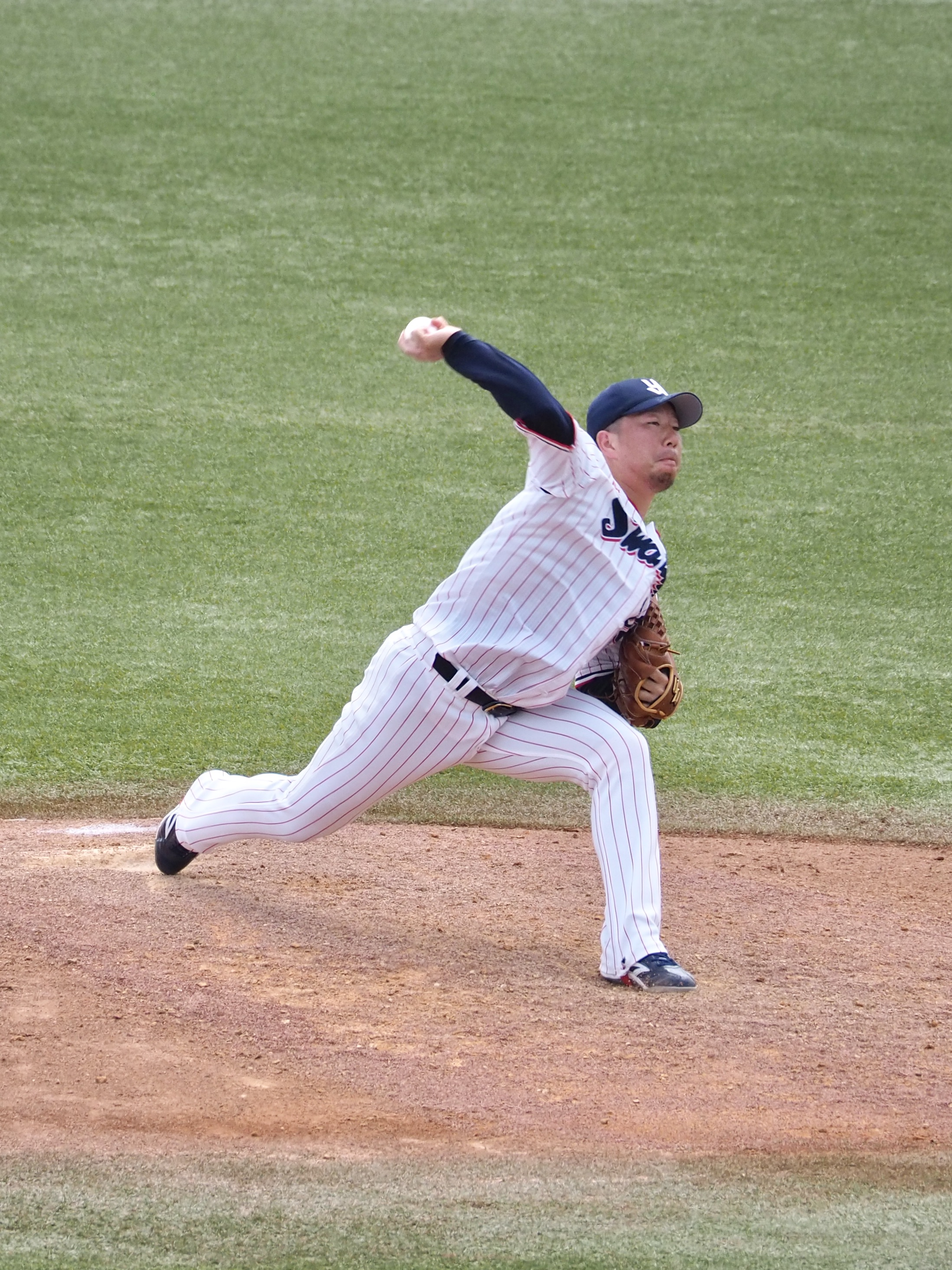
- Konno in 2021 with the Tokyo Yakult Swallows

Tohoku Rakuten Golden Eagles – No. 66
- Pitcher
- Born: May 11, 1995 (age 30); Tamatsukuri District, Miyagi, Japan
- Bats: Right Throws: Right

NPB debut
- August 20, 2014, for the Tohoku Rakuten Golden Eagles

Career statistics (through 2024 season)
- Win–loss record: 10-4
- Earned Run Average: 3.80
- Strikeouts: 169
- Saves: 1
- Holds: 47

Teams
- Tohoku Rakuten Golden Eagles (2014-2019, 2025-present); Tokyo Yakult Swallows (2020–2024)

Ryūta Konno (今野 龍太, Konno Ryūta; born May 11, 1995 in Tamatsukuri, Miyagi, Japan) is a professional Japanese baseball player. He plays pitcher for the Tohoku Rakuten Golden Eagles.
