= Allen Kuri =

Japanese baseball player (born 1991)

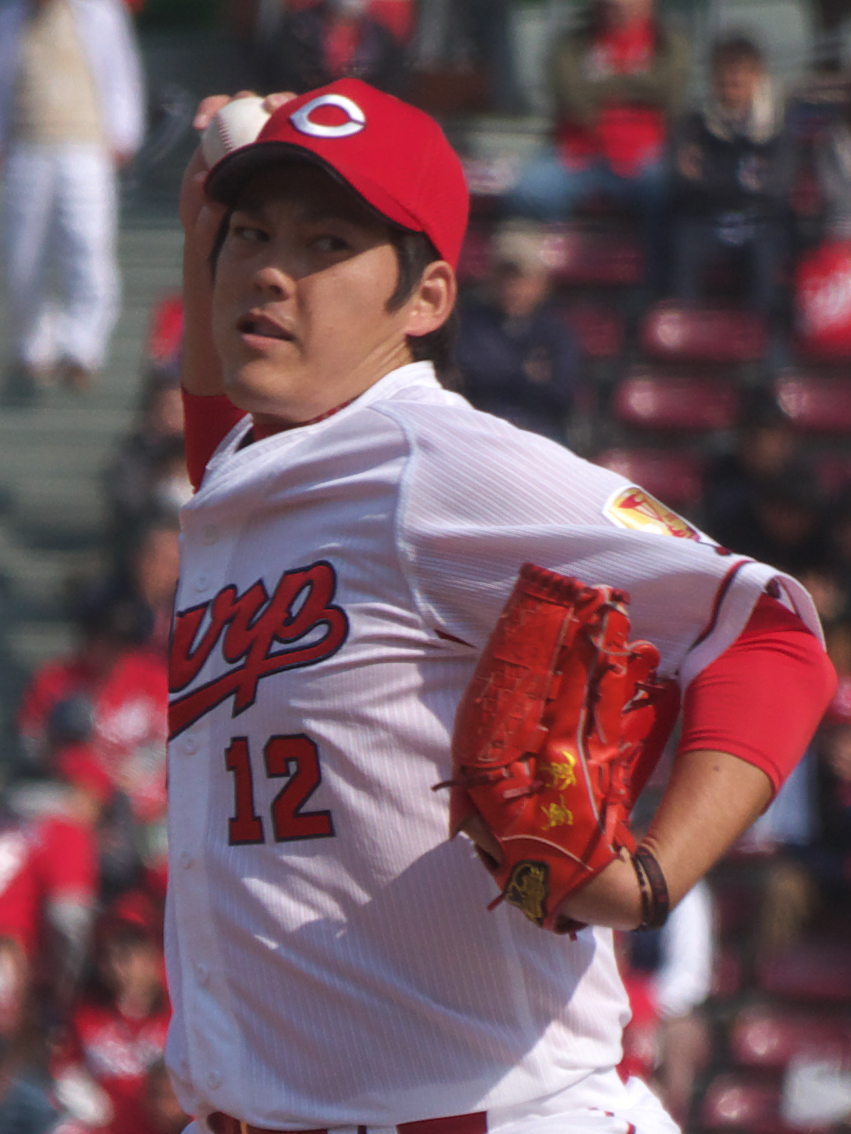

Orix Buffaloes – No. 22
- Pitcher
- Born: September 1, 1991 (age 35); Yonago, Japan
- Bats: Right Throws: Right

NPB debut
- March 29, 2014, for the Hiroshima Toyo Carp

NPB statistics (through 2025 season)
- Win–loss record: 82–75
- Earned run average: 3.37
- Strikeouts: 1,058
- Stats at Baseball Reference

Teams
- Hiroshima Toyo Carp (2014–2024); Orix Buffaloes (2025–present)

Career highlights and awards
- 2x NPB All-Star (2023, 2025); Central League wins champion (2021)

Aren Kuri (九里 亜蓮, Kuri Aren; born September 1, 1991) is a Japanese professional baseball pitcher for the Orix Buffaloes of Nippon Professional Baseball (NPB). He has previously played in NPB for the Hiroshima Toyo Carp.

== Career ==
Kuri was drafted by the Hiroshima Toyo Carp in the second round of the 2013 Nippon Professional Baseball draft.
