= Masahiko Tanaka (baseball) =

Japanese baseball player (born 1982)

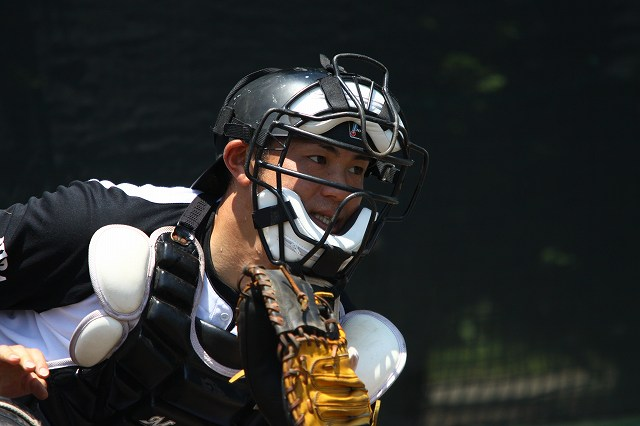

Tokyo Yakult Swallows – No. 86
- Catcher / Manager
- Born: January 9, 1982 (age 44)
- Batted: Right Threw: Right

NPB debut
- May 27, 2007, for the Chiba Lotte Marines

Last NPB appearance
- August 30, 2015, for the Tokyo Yakult Swallows

NPB statistics
- Batting average: .219
- Home runs: 1
- RBI: 24
- Stats at Baseball Reference

Teams
- As player: Chiba Lotte Marines (2007–2012); Tokyo Yakult Swallows (2013, 2015); As manager: Fukui Miracle Elephants (2018–2019); As coach: Fukui Miracle Elephants (2017); Tohoku Rakuten Golden Eagles (2023–2025); Tokyo Yakult Swallows (2026–present)

Masahiko Tanaka (田中 雅彦, born January 9, 1982, in Tondabayashi, Osaka) is a Japanese former professional baseball catcher in Japan's Nippon Professional Baseball. He played with the Chiba Lotte Marines from 2007 to 2012 and the Tokyo Yakult Swallows in 2013 and 2015.
