= Shōma Fujihira =

Japanese baseball player (born 1998)

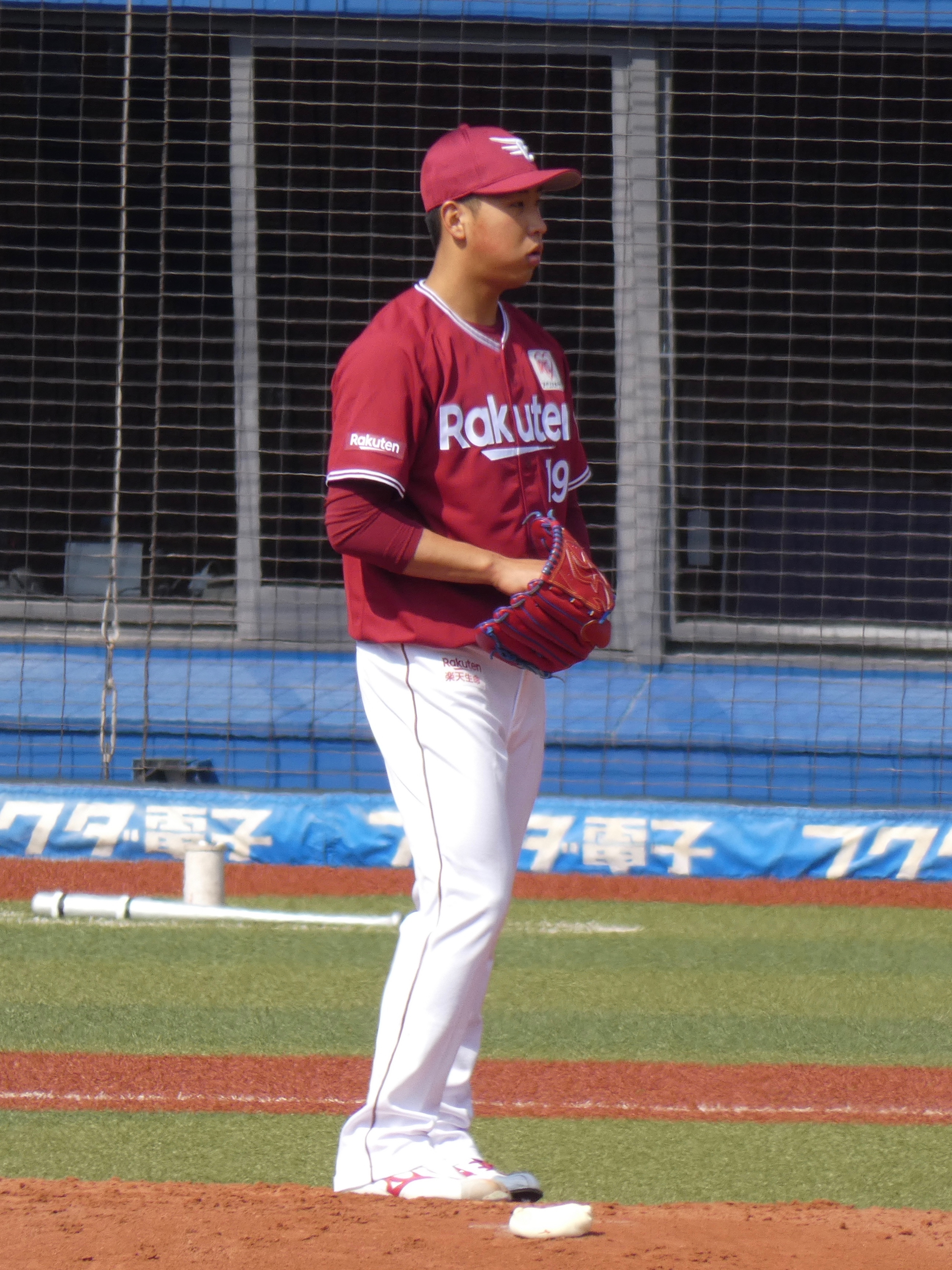
- Fujihira in 2019

Tohoku Rakuten Golden Eagles – No. 46
- pitcher
- Born: September 21, 1998 (age 27); Chiba, Chiba, Japan
- Bats: Right Throws: Right

NPB debut
- June 16, 2017, for the Tohoku Rakuten Golden Eagles

Career statistics (through 9 August 2026)
- Win–loss: 12-21
- ERA: 3.41
- Strikeouts: 340
- Saves: 34
- Stats at Baseball Reference

Teams
- Tohoku Rakuten Golden Eagles (2017–present)
Medals
Men's baseball
Representing Japan
WBSC Premier12
Silver medal – second place	2024	Team

Shōma Fujihira (藤平 尚真, Fujihira Shōma; born September 21, 1998 in Chiba, Chiba, Japan) is a professional Japanese baseball player. He is pitcher for the Tohoku Rakuten Golden Eagles. He played for the Japan national team in the 2026 World Baseball Classic and 2024 WBSC Premier12.

== Career ==
=== Amateur career ===
In the sixth grade, after being selected for the Chiba Lotte Marines Junior Team, Fujihira helped lead the squad to victory in the NPB 12-Team Junior Tournament.

During his time at Onuki Junior High School in Futtsu, while playing for the Chiba City Little Senior team, he was selected for the Japan national under-15 team alongside players including Hyo Ishihara. In his third year of junior high school, he won the high jump event at the Junior Olympics in track and field and took second place at the All-Japan Junior High School Athletics Championships. Yūya Gunji was a year ahead of him on the Little Senior team.

=== Tohoku Rakuten Golden Eagles ===
During the 2016 NPB Draft, Fujihira received a sole first-round nomination from the Tohoku Rakuten Golden Eagles and joined the team with a signing bonus of 100 million yen and an annual salary of 15 million yen (figures are estimated). He was assigned jersey number 19—a number not used since 2009, following the retirement of manager Katsuya Nomura. At his introductory press conference, Fujihira expressed his aspiration: "I intend to play with determination, striving to become a core player for this team".

==== 2017 ====
Although Fujihira began spring training in the 2017 season with the first team, he was reassigned to the second team for conditioning starting February 12, when the squad embarked on a road trip focused primarily on game play.

In the Eastern League, he made 11 appearances, posting a 1–2 record with a 3.35 earned run average (ERA) and 58 strikeouts in 51 innings pitched, and made his NPB debut and first career start against the Hanshin Tigers on June 16. His line for the game was: 5 innings pitched, 5 hits, 2 walks/hit-by-pitches, 0 strikeouts, and 2 runs allowed, and he suffered his first professional loss. He was removed from the active roster the following day, on the 17th.

At the minor league level, he was selected for the Fresh All-Star Game held on July 13, pitching as the second reliever for the Eastern League All-Stars, he delivered a strong performance, retiring the side in order—including two strikeouts—over one inning and received the Outstanding Player Award.

On August 6, he made his second NPB start, facing the Chiba Lotte Marines. He pitched well, allowing just two runs over six innings, but received no run support from the lineup and was charged with the loss and delisted the following day, on the 7th. When he started against Lotte on August 22, he pitched five innings, allowing two hits and one walk while striking out seven and surrendering no runs to earn his first professional victory, although he was removed from the player roster the following day, the 23rd. He started in the game against the Hokkaido Nippon-Ham Fighters on September 5. where he joined the starting rotation late in the season.

In his rookie year, he made eight starts for the first team, recording a 3–4 record and a 2.28 ERA. In addition, he recorded 3 wins and 4 losses with an ERA of 2.96 in 17 appearances in the minor leagues. He received the Eastern League Outstanding Player Award.

He was on standby as a relief pitcher during the postseason. He took the mound in Game 5 of the Climax Series Final Stage against the Fukuoka SoftBank Hawks, holding them to just one run over 2 2/3 innings.

During the offseason, he renewed his contract for an estimated annual salary of 18 million yen—a raise of 3 million yen.

==== 2018 ====
Fujihira made the starting rotation at the beginning of the 2018 season and in his first three starts of the season, he posted a record of 1–1 with an ERA of 1.47. However, in the following two matches, he conceded five or more runs. In the subsequent game against the Orix Buffaloes on May 13, he loaded the bases in three consecutive innings. He left the game after pitching three innings, allowing four hits, five walks and hit-by-pitches, and one run. He was removed from the active roster the next day.

He continued his rehabilitation in the minor leagues thereafter; however, on August 9—during a game against Nippon-Ham—he took the mound after Manabu Mima was forced to sit out due to right elbow pain. Stepping in as a substitute starter, he delivered seven scoreless innings to earn the win.

==== 2019 ====
Fujihira secured a spot in the Opening Day rotation in the 2019 season for the second consecutive year, and took the mound in the third game of the opening series against Lotte. Making his season debut and first start, he was pulled from the game after pitching 2 1/3 innings—requiring 72 pitches—in a shaky outing that saw him surrender four hits, four walks/hit-by-pitches, and three runs. In the subsequent game against Orix on April 7, he required 40 pitches to get through two innings before being pulled from the game, having allowed one hit, two walks, and one run. He was removed from the active roster the following day, on the 8th.

In the minor leagues, he worked on correcting his pitching form; appearing in 13 games in the Eastern League, he posted a record of 5 wins and 2 losses with an ERA of 2.88.

He was given an opportunity to start for the first team in the game against Lotte on August 5, but—partly due to poor defensive support from his teammates he took the loss after allowing 6 runs over 4 1/3 innings. He was removed from the player roster the following day. He made no further appearances with the first team; his season ultimately concluded with an 0–1 record across three games, posting an ERA of 10.38. However, in the minor leagues, he reached the required number of innings pitched, posting a 9–2 record with a 2.91 ERA over 19 appearances, recording the best winning percentage in the Eastern League at .818 (Note: 3 Complete Games. He also recorded a league-leading 107 strikeouts.), and he won the title for the highest winning percentage.

He renewed his contract during the off-season for an estimated annual salary of 15 million yen—a reduction of 3 million yen.

==== 2020 ====
Due to the impact of the COVID-19 pandemic, the 2020 NPB season was shortened to a 120-game schedule, and Opening Day was postponed until June 19. For the first time in three years, Fujihira began the season assigned to the minor league team. In the Eastern League, he made three appearances, recording a 1–0 record and a 3.46 ERA.

On July 26, he made his season NPB debut, starting against the Orix Buffaloes. In the first inning with no outs and a runner on second base, he hit Koji Oshiro in the head with a pitch and was ejected for throwing a "dangerous pitch" after throwing seven pitches. He was removed from the roster the following day. Subsequently, he stepped away from official game appearances, making his return to the mound in a minor league game on September 4—his first official game in approximately one month. Including this game, he has continued to make appearances consisting of short innings. (Note: September 4: Started and pitched 2 innings September 13: 1 inning in relief On the 17th, he started and pitched two innings. On the 24th, he started and pitched 3 innings. October 11: 1 1/3 innings in relief) The first time he pitched five innings following his removal from the active roster was in a minor league game on October 22.

His major league appearances for the year were limited to one game. During the offseason, he renewed his contract for an estimated annual salary of 12 million yen—a reduction of 3 million yen.

==== 2021 ====
Fujihira began the 2021 season in the Eastern League, where he had an 0–5 record and 9.15 ERA in his first six starts. Struggling to find his form, he stepped away from official game appearances following his outing on May 25. On June 30, he made his first official game appearance in approximately one month, pitching in relief during a minor league game. He continued to be used as a relief pitcher and lowered his ERA to 6.91.

Although he made a starting appearance in the minor league game on September 14, he gave up four runs over three innings and was charged with the loss. That year, pitching solely in the minors, he finished with an 0–6 record with a 7.16 ERA in 18 games. For the first time in his professional career, he did not pitch in NPB

During the offseason, his jersey number was changed to 46. During contract renewal negotiations on November 30, he signed for an estimated annual salary of 10 million yen—a reduction of 2 million yen.

==== 2022 ====
Although Fujihira started spring training in the 2022 season with the minor league team, he joined the first team on March 8. In exhibition games, he pitched a total of four innings across four appearances, holding opponents to three hits, no walks or hit-by-pitches, three strikeouts, and one earned run and made the Opening Day roster as a relief pitcher.

Fujihira had a 3.00 ERA in his first three appearances at the start of the season. He was removed from the active roster on April 18. Fujihira continued to work as a reliever in the minor leagues through May and made a starting appearance in the minor league game on June 1. Including that game, he recorded 2 wins and 0 losses with a 3.79 ERA in 4 appearances.

He made his first start of the season in the game against Lotte on July 18, pitching four innings and allowing one run, but received no decision. He was removed from the player roster the following day. He started against Orix on September 1 but was pulled in the middle of the third inning after allowing four runs, three of them earned. He was reassigned the following day. He made no further appearances with the first team and recorded a 1–0 record and a 3.97 ERA in eight games (five starts) that year.

During the offseason, he renewed his contract at an estimated annual salary of 10 million yen—maintaining his current pay level.

==== 2023 ====
Before the 2023 season, Fujihira continued to make his case throughout spring training and the exhibition games, earning a spot in the Opening Day rotation for the first time in five years. The third game of the opening series against Nippon-Ham was his first appearance and first start of the season. He pitched six innings, allowing just one run, and earned his first win of the season.

During a period of irregular schedules with five games each week, the starting appearance of Takayuki Kishi was scheduled though his preparation had been lagging. Due to team circumstances, Fujihira was removed from the active roster the following day, April 3. After that, he was promoted and demoted three times. He finished with a 2–4 record and 4.44 ERA in 11 starts.

At the conclusion of the season, new manager Toshiaki Imae approached Fujihira about transitioning to a relief role. Imae later explained his reasoning, stating that "[Fujihira] is a stoic player." "He revealed, 'His inquisitive nature is so intense that he ended up overthinking things far too much during the week. I came to feel—and thought it might suit him better—that he would be better off pitching in games every day as a middle reliever, constantly keeping his hand on the ball.'"

Fujihara renewed his contract during the off-season for an estimated annual salary of 14.5 million yen—an increase of 4.5 million yen.

==== 2024 ====
Fujihira started the 2024 season in the first team as a relief pitcher. He recorded his first career hold against Orix on April 11. On May 8, he was forced to leave the game against Orix in an emergency and was removed from the active roster the following day. On May 11, he was diagnosed with a Grade 2 injury to the left internal oblique muscle at a hospital in Sendai.

Fujihara returned to minor league action on June 8. He made his return to the first team on June 25. Acknowledging that he had overexerted himself since spring training, he said: "My desire to catch up with those around me was so strong that I ended up overworking myself," and he subsequently adjusted his training regimen.

Fujihira established a winning pattern in the second half of the season. In the game against Nippon-Ham on October 8, he was entrusted with the top of the ninth inning holding a two-run lead; he retired the side in order—including two strikeouts—to earn his first NPB save.

This was his breakout season, appearing in 47 games with an 0–1 record, a 1.75 ERA, 20 holds, and 1 save.

He renewed his contract during the offseason for an estimated annual salary of 40 million yen—an increase of 25.5 million yen.

==== 2025 ====
Fujihara started the 2025 season, deployed in a high-leverage situation. The team's closer, Takahiro Norimoto, successfully converted his first five save opportunities of the season. However, he then suffered two blown saves in tie games. Fujihira took over as closer from late April. Against SoftBank on April 27, he took the mound in the top of the ninth inning with a one-run lead, only to surrender a game-tying solo home run to leadoff batter Tatsuru Yanagimachi.

Against Seibu on May 1, Fujihara took the mound in the bottom of the 9th inning with the score tied. In the bottom of the 10th—having carried over into the next inning—he allowed a right-field single with no outs and a runner on second base. The throw from Yūya Ogō, who fielded the ball, went awry, and the ball rolled toward the area in front of the third-base dugout. Fujihira—who should have been moving in to provide backup—had taken his eyes off the ball, allowing the runner who had stopped at third base to score the winning run, resulting in a walk-off loss. He was removed from the active roster the following day. He appeared in 11 games since Opening Day, with an 0–1 record, five holds, two saves, and a 3.72 ERA.

Upon being recalled on May 13, he gradually regained his form as a setup man. Beginning with his appearance against the Hawks on July 11, he went on a streak of scoreless outings; starting in August, he again replaced Norimoto as the team's closer. Ultimately recording 12 saves, he finished the season having allowed zero runs—both earned and unearned—in the second half, while maintaining a club-record streak of 29 consecutive scoreless appearances.

During the offseason, he was called up to the Japan national team roster for the 2025 Ragxas Samurai Japan Series against South Korea.

==== 2026 ====
On February 11, 2026, Fujihira was one of six preliminary roster members named to the Japan national team ahead of the 2026 World Baseball Classic. That day, Kaima Taira withdrew from the national team due to a calf strain, and Fujihira was called up as his replacement.

== International career ==
On October 9, 2024, it was announced that he had been selected to the Japan national team for the 2024 WBSC Premier12.

During the tournament, he made the most appearances on the team, pitching in six games. He delivered a standout performance across a total of six innings, recording a 0-0 record with one save, a 0.00 ERA, allowing just four hits, and striking out 12 batters.

In the 2026 World Baseball Classic, Fujihira was perfect against two batters. On March 6, he struck out the only Chinese Taipei batter he faced, An-Ko Lin. On March 14, he induced a foul pop out by Eugenio Suárez of Venezuela.

== Player profile ==
2024 Season Pitching Data
Pitch Type	Allocation (percentage)	Average Pitch speed (km/h)	Hit Rate
Fastball	62.0	150.7	.176
Fork Ball	32.5	139.7	.154
Curve	5.1	122.5	.429
Slider	0.4	139.7	-

Fujihira's primary pitches are a forkball and a fastball with a speed of 156 km/h (97 mph) His also has thrown a curveball since high school.

He has added a changeup, shuuto, and cut fastball. Despite continuing to engage in a process of trial and error—such as working on new pitches, repeatedly making minor adjustments to his delivery, and even reducing the frequency with which he touched the rosin bag to quicken his pitching tempo—he was unable to achieve the desired results as a starting pitcher.

In the 2024 season, he had a strikeout percentage of 31.9%, ranking second in NPB among pitchers who threw at least 30 innings. For the seven seasons after turning pro, he was expected to be a pillar of the starting rotation and had 45 appearances (42 starts), with 10 wins, 16 losses, and a 4.27 ERA.

== Statistics and Awards ==
Pitching Statistics
Year	Team	Appearances	Starts	Complete Games	Shutouts	No-Walk Games	Wins	Losses	Saves	Holds	Win Pct.	Batters faced	Innings Pitched	Hits Allowed	Home Runs Allowed	Walks	Intentional Walks	Hit by Pitch	Strikeouts	Wild Pitches	Balks	Runs Allowed	Earned Runs	ERA	WHIP
2017	Tohoku Rakuten Golden Eagles	8	8	0	0	0	3	4	0	0	.429	176	43.1	30	2	15	0	4	44	0	0	12	11	2.28	1.04
2018	Tohoku Rakuten Golden Eagles	14	14	1	0	0	4	7	0	0	.364	361	81.1	65	17	54	1	3	68	6	1	43	40	4.43	1.46
2019	Tohoku Rakuten Golden Eagles	3	3	0	0	0	0	1	0	0	.000	45	8.2	9	4	7	0	3	6	0	0	10	10	10.38	1.85
2020	Tohoku Rakuten Golden Eagles	1	1	0	0	0	0	0	0	0	----	2	0.0	1	0	0	0	1	0	0	0	2	2	----	----
2022	Tohoku Rakuten Golden Eagles	8	5	0	0	0	1	0	0	0	1.000	94	22.2	15	0	12	0	0	17	3	0	11	10	3.97	1.19
2023	Tohoku Rakuten Golden Eagles	11	11	0	0	0	2	4	0	0	.333	231	50.2	50	5	27	0	1	42	5	0	35	25	4.44	1.52
2024	Tohoku Rakuten Golden Eagles	47	0	0	0	0	0	1	1	20	.000	182	46.1	29	4	12	2	3	58	3	0	11	9	1.75	0.88
2025	Tohoku Rakuten Golden Eagles	62	0	0	0	0	2	2	12	21	.500	238	59.2	45	6	20	2	0	66	1	0	16	14	2.11	1.09
Totals (7 Years)		154	42	1	0	0	12	19	13	41	.387	1329	312.2	244	38	147	5	15	301	18	1	135	121	3.48	1.25

- As of the end of the 2025 season
