= Tatsuya Shimozono =

Japanese baseball player (born 1984)

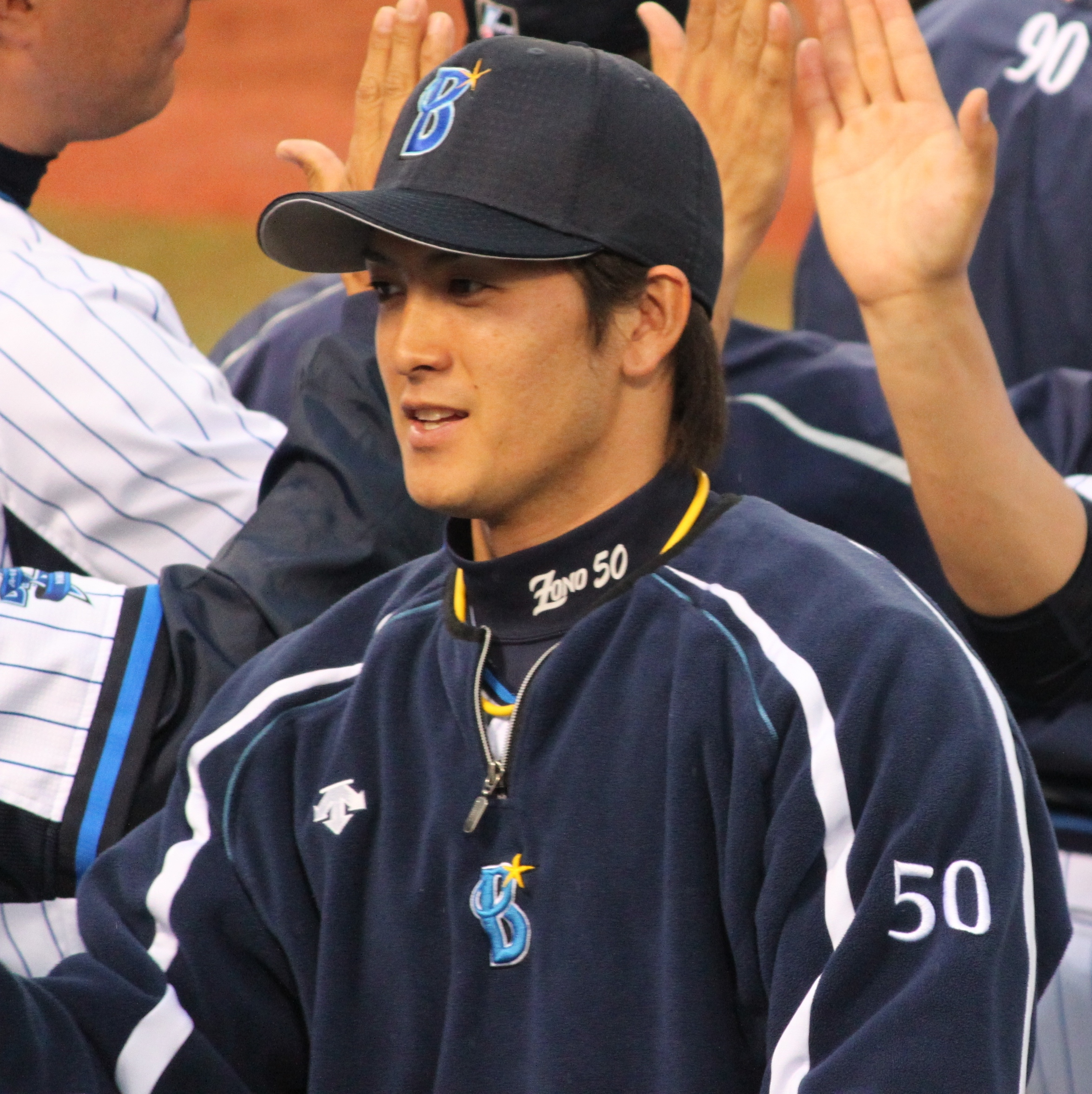
- Shimozono with the Yokohama DeNA BayStars

Tohoku Rakuten Golden Eagles – No. 76
- Outfielder / Coach
- Born: November 22, 1984 (age 41); Sadowara, Miyazaki, Japan
- Batted: Left Threw: Left

NPB debut
- June 30, 2007, for the Yokohama BayStars

Last NPB appearance
- June 4, 2017, for the Yokohama DeNA BayStars

NPB statistics (through 2017)
- Batting average: .263
- Hits: 373
- Home runs: 16
- RBI: 110
- Stolen bases: 5
- Stats at Baseball Reference

Teams
- As player: Yokohama BayStars/Yokohama DeNA BayStars (2007–2018); As coach: Yokohama DeNA BayStars (2020–2024); Tohoku Rakuten Golden Eagles (2025–present)

Tatsuya Shimozono (下園 辰哉, Shimozono Tatsuya; born November 22, 1984 in Sadowara, Miyazaki, Japan) is a professional Japanese baseball player. He plays outfielder for the Yokohama DeNA BayStars.
