= Ren Kajiya =

Japanese baseball player (born 1991)

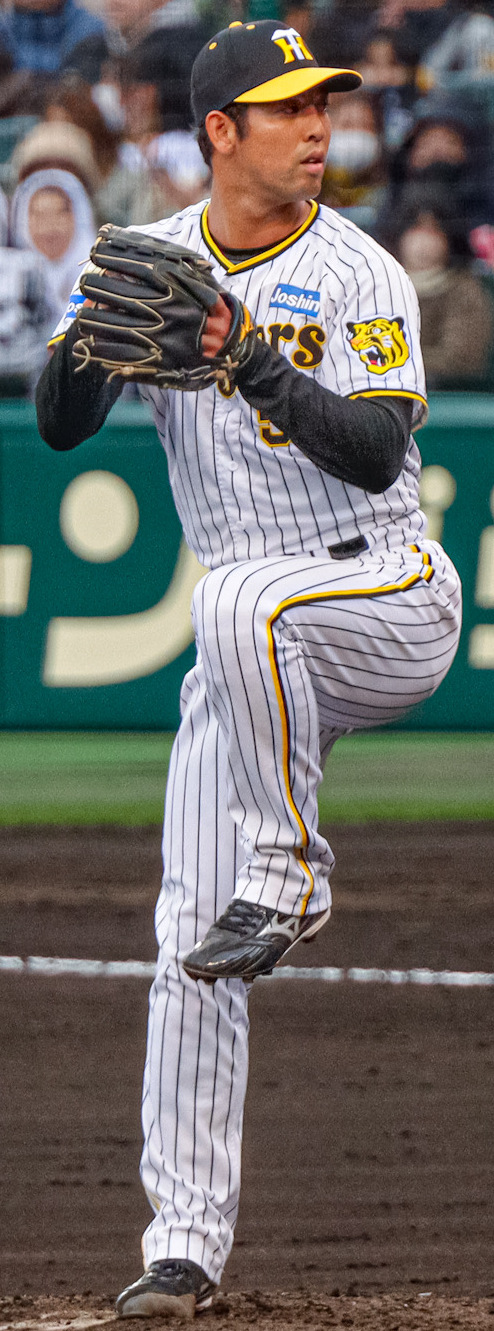
- Kajiya with the Hansin Tigers

Tohoku Rakuten Golden Eagles – No. 41
- pitcher
- Born: November 25, 1991 (age 34); Kushima, Miyazaki, Japan
- Bats: Right Throws: Right

NPB debut
- August 26, 2016, for the Fukuoka SoftBank Hawks

NPB statistics (through 2024 season)
- Win–loss record: 11–13
- ERA: 3.99
- Strikeouts: 158
- Saves: 1
- Holds: 62
- Stats at Baseball Reference

Teams
- Fukuoka SoftBank Hawks (2014–2020); Hanshin Tigers (2021–2024); Tohoku Rakuten Golden Eagles (2025–present)

Career highlights and awards
- NPB All-Star (2018); 2× Japan Series champion (2018, 2023)

Ren Kajiya (加治屋 蓮, Kajiya Ren; born November 25, 1991) is a Japanese professional baseball pitcher for the Tohoku Rakuten Golden Eagles of Nippon Professional Baseball (NPB). He has previously played in NPB for the Fukuoka SoftBank Hawks and Hanshin Tigers.

== Professional career ==
=== Fukuoka Softbank Hawks ===
On October 24, 2013, Kajiya was drafted by the Fukuoka Softbank Hawks in the first overall pick in the 2013 Nippon Professional Baseball draft. In the 2014 -2015 season, he played in the Western League of NPB's minor leagues and played in informal matches against Shikoku Island League Plus's teams.

On August 26, 2016, Kajiya pitched his debut game as a relief pitcher against the Chiba Lotte Marines. In the 2016 -2017 season, he pitched in four games. On July 14, 2018, Kajiya pitched in the 2018 NPB All-Star game. In the 2018 season, he pitched in 72 games as a setup man, matching the Hawks' record. And he finished the regular season with a 4–3 win–loss record, a 3.38 ERA, 31 holds, 53 strikeouts in 66 2/3 innings, and he pitched in the 2018 Japan Series. In the 2019 season, Kajiya finished the regular season with 30 games pitched, a 3–1 win–loss record, a 6.00 ERA, and 23 strikeouts in 36 innings. On December 2, 2020, he became a free agent.

=== Hanshin Tigers ===
On December 15, 2020, Kajiya signed with Hanshin Tigers of NPB and held a press conference.
