= Rui Muneyama =

Japanese baseball player (born 2003)

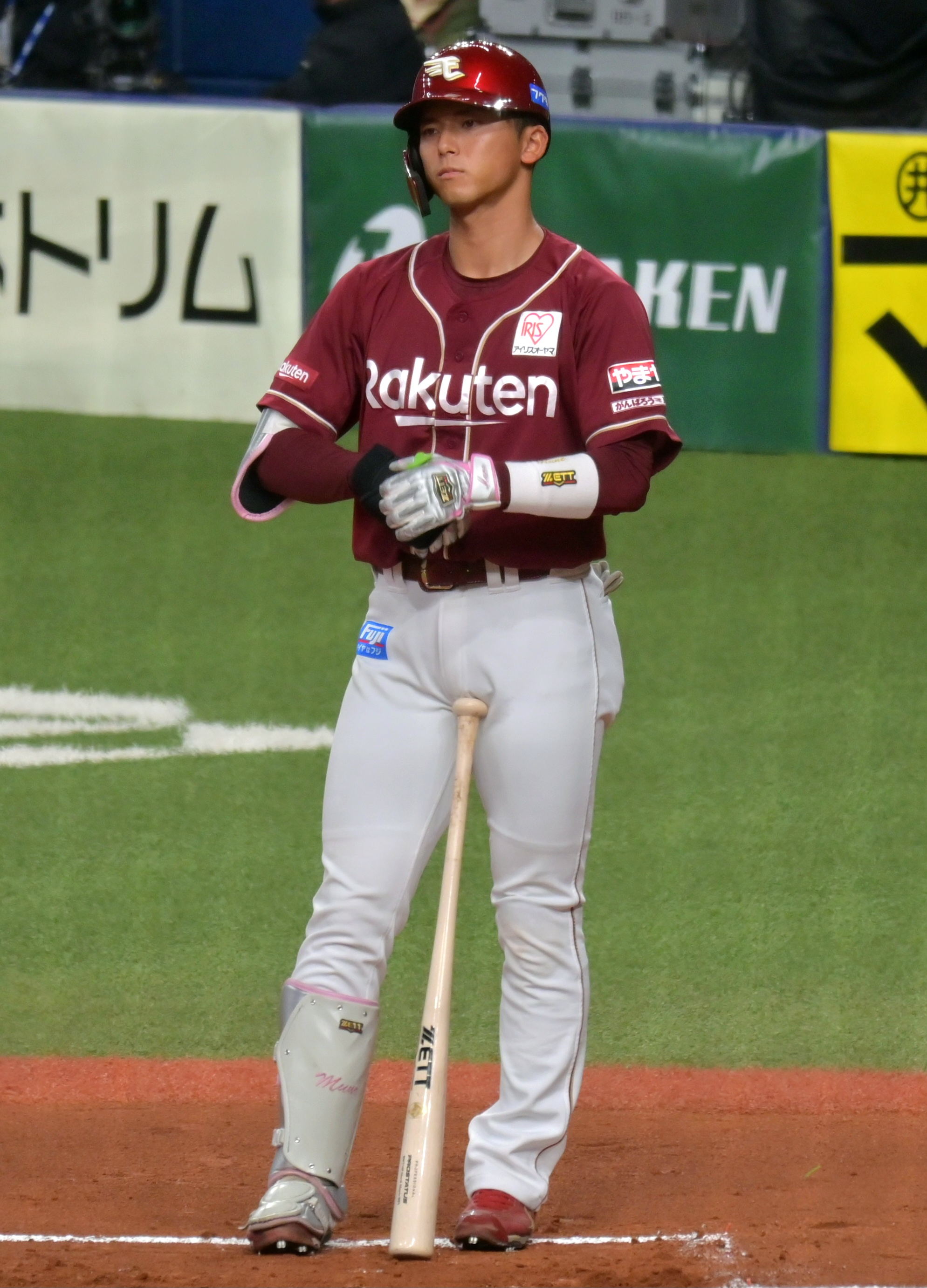

Tohoku Rakuten Golden Eagles – No. 1
- Infielder
- Born: February 27, 2003 (age 22); Miyoshi, Hiroshima, Japan
- Bats: Left Throws: Right

NPB debut
- March 28, 2025, for the Tohoku Rakuten Golden Eagles

NPB statistics (through 2025 season)
- Batting average: .260
- Home runs: 3
- RBI: 27
- Stats at Baseball Reference

Teams
- Tohoku Rakuten Golden Eagles (2025–present)

Career highlights and awards
- 1× NPB All-Star (2025); 1× Pacific League Best Nine Award (2025)

Rui Muneyama (宗山 塁, Muneyama Rui; born February 27, 2003) is a Japanese professional baseball infielder for the Tohoku Rakuten Golden Eagles of Nippon Professional Baseball (NPB).
