= Itsuki Murabayashi =

Japanese baseball player (born 1997)

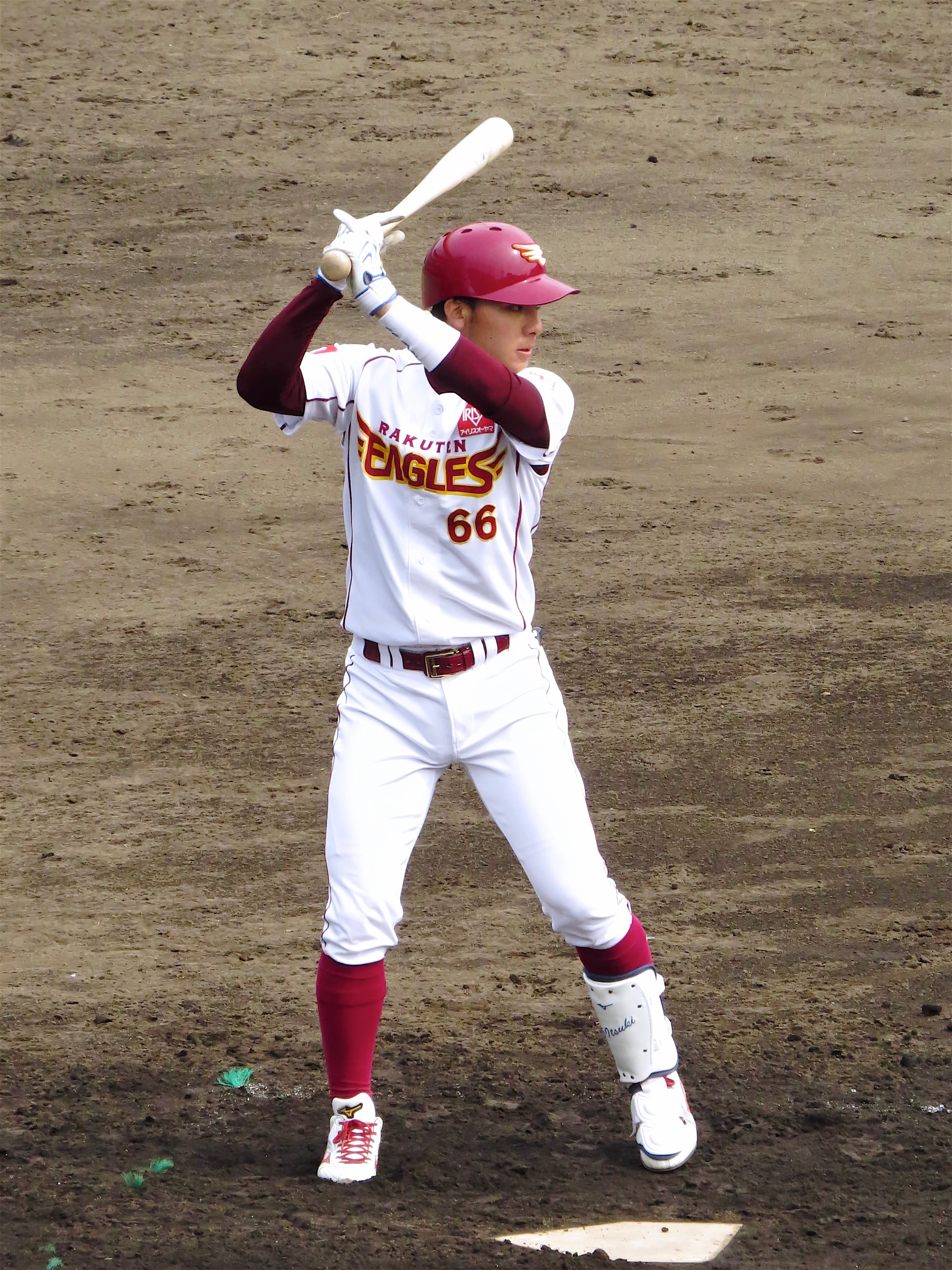

Tohoku Rakuten Golden Eagles – No. 6
- Infielder
- Born: October 6, 1997 (age 28); Sakai, Osaka, Japan
- Bats: Right Throws: Right

NPB debut
- October 10, 2017, for the Tohoku Rakuten Golden Eagles

NPB statistics (through 2025 season)
- Batting average: .249
- Home runs: 12
- Runs batted in: 139
- Stats at Baseball Reference

Teams
- Tohoku Rakuten Golden Eagles (2016–present)

Career highlights and awards
- 1× NPB All-Star (2025); 1× Pacific League Hits champions (2025); 1× Pacific League Best Nine Award (2025); 1× Pacific League Mitsui Golden Glove Award (2025)

Itsuki Murabayashi (村林 一輝, Murabayashi Itsuki; born October 6, 1997) is a Japanese professional baseball infielder for the Tohoku Rakuten Golden Eagles of Nippon Professional Baseball (NPB).
