= Ryosuke Morioka =

Japanese baseball player (born 1984)

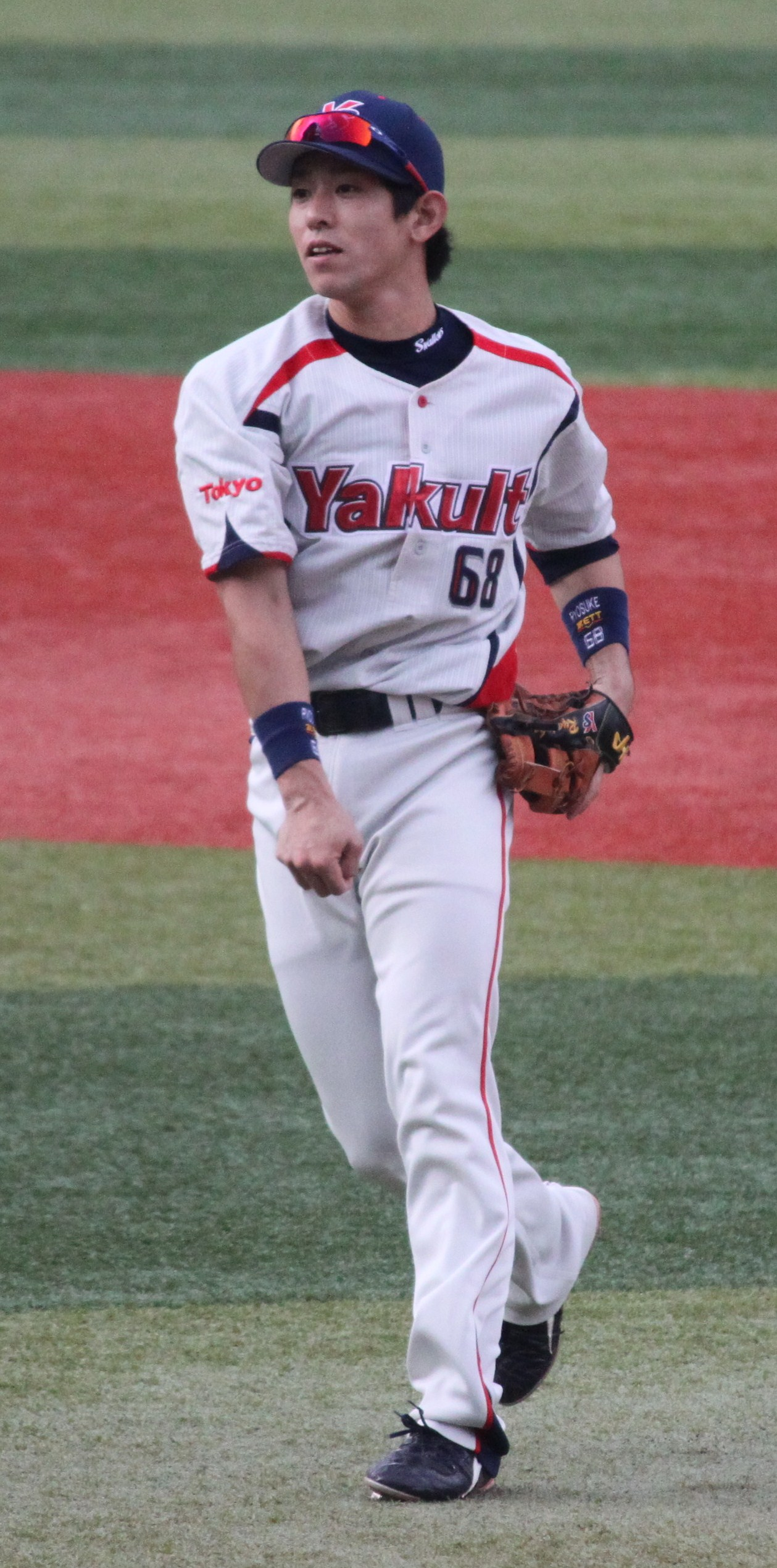

Tohoku Rakuten Golden Eagles – No. 95
- Infielder / Coach
- Born: July 15, 1984 (age 41); Osaka, Japan
- Batted: Left Threw: Right

NPB debut
- August 6, 2003, for the Chunichi Dragons

Last NPB appearance
- September 26, 2016, for the Tokyo Yakult Swallows

NPB statistics (through 2016)
- Batting average: .241
- Hits: 290
- Home runs: 7
- RBI: 97
- Stolen bases: 4
- Stats at Baseball Reference

Teams
- As player: Chunichi Dragons (2003–2008); Tokyo Yakult Swallows (2009–2016); As coach: Tokyo Yakult Swallows (2017–2024); Tohoku Rakuten Golden Eagles (2015–)

Ryosuke Morioka (森岡 良介, Morioka Ryōsuke; born July 15, 1984 in Sasebo, Nagasaki and raised in Jōtō-ku, Osaka, Japan) is a professional Japanese baseball player. He plays infielder for the Tokyo Yakult Swallows.
