= Rikuto Yokoyama =

Japanese baseball player (born 2001)

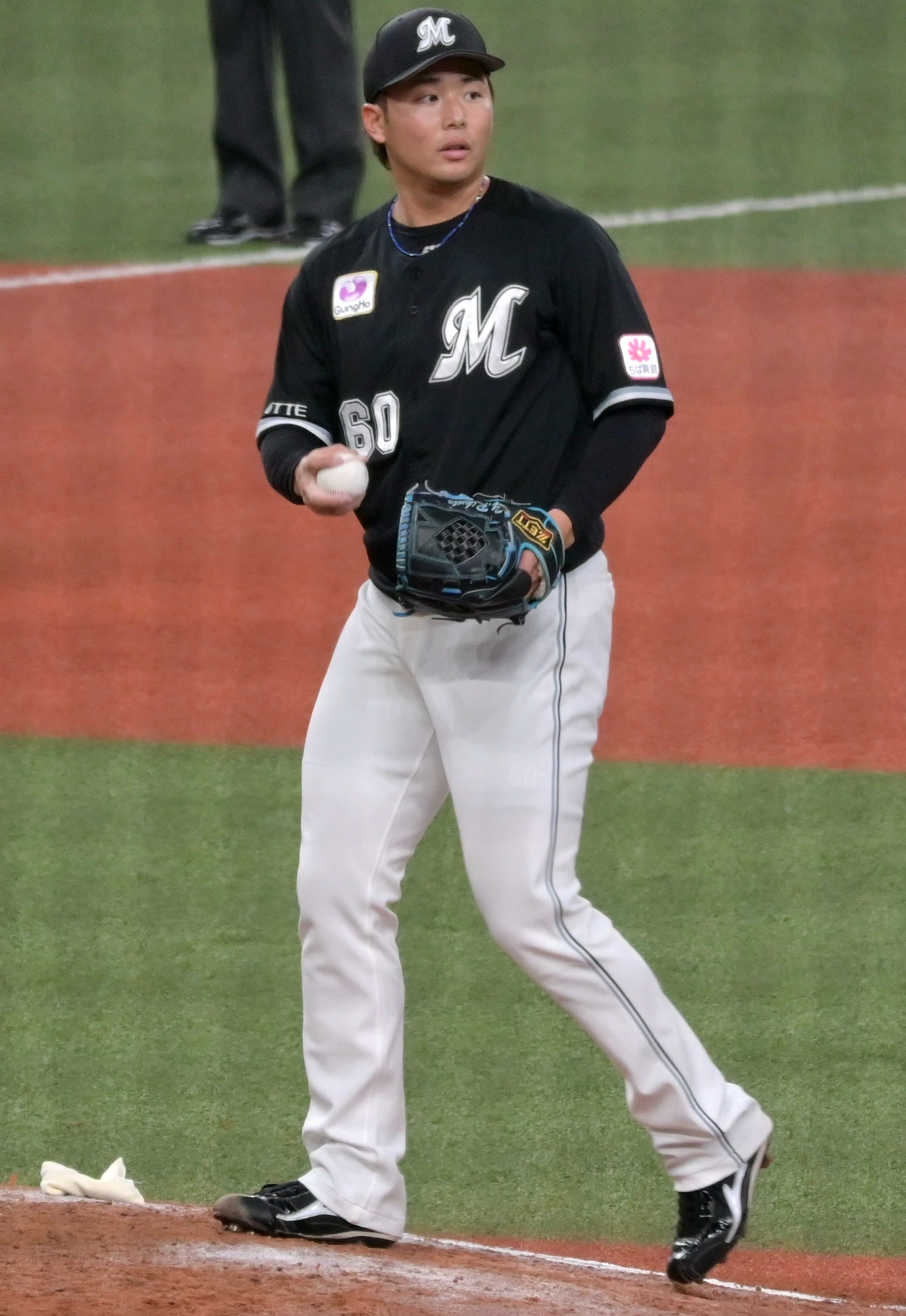

Chiba Lotte Marines – No. 15
- Pitcher
- Born: 5 August 2001 (age 24); Edogawa, Tokyo, Japan
- Bats: Right Throws: Right

NPB debut
- 26 May, 2021, for the Chiba Lotte Marines

NPB statistics (through 2024 season)
- Win–loss record: 5–4
- Earned run average: 3.73
- Strikeouts: 91
- Saves: 4
- Holds: 26
- Stats at Baseball Reference

Teams
- Chiba Lotte Marines (2020–present)
Medals
Men's baseball
Representing Japan
Asia Professional Baseball Championship
Gold medal – first place	2023 Tokyo	Team
WBSC Premier12
Silver medal – second place	2024 Tokyo	Team

Rikuto Yokoyama (横山 陸人, Yokoyama Rikuto; born 5 August 2001) is a Japanese professional baseball pitcher for the Chiba Lotte Marines of Nippon Professional Baseball (NPB).

== Career ==
Yokoyama was selected by the Chiba Lotte Marines in the 2019 Nippon Professional Baseball draft. He made his professional debut in the Nippon Professional Baseball on 26 May 2021 against the Hanshin Tigers, pitching one inning allowing no runs and one hit. In 2010, he pitched ten games posting an ERA of 6.00.

In 2022, Yokoyama pitched only one game, posting an ERA of 27.00. In 2023, he played 38 games, recording two wins, three losses, one save, 42 strikeouts and an ERA of 5.26. In 2024, he played 43 games, finishing with a 3–1 record and three saves, posting an ERA of 1.71.

== International career ==
Yokoyama was part of the Japanese team that won the 2023 Asia Professional Baseball Championship. He was also selected to represent Japan in the 2024 WBSC Premier12.
