= Sun Yi-lei =

Taiwanese baseball player (born 2005)

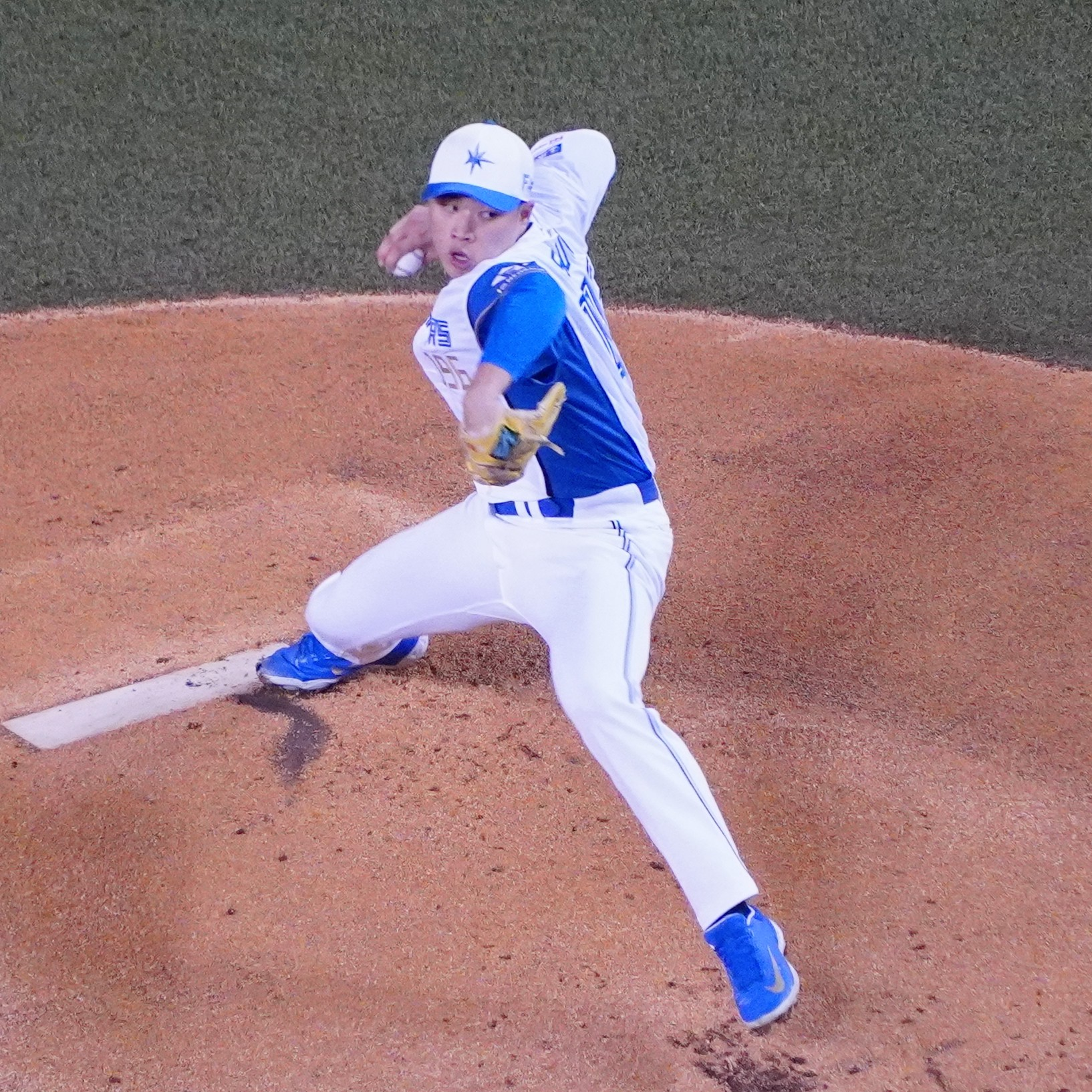

Hokkaido Nippon-Ham Fighters – No. 96
- Relief pitcher
- Born: February 10, 2005 (age 21); Taipei, Taiwan
- Bats: Left Throws: Right

NPB debut
- May 22, 2025, for the Hokkaido Nippon-Ham Fighters

NPB statistics (through September 20, 2026)
- Win–loss record: 2−3
- Earned run average: 3.18
- Strikeouts: 34
- Stats at Baseball Reference

Teams
- Hokkaido Nippon-Ham Fighters (2024–present)

Sun Yi-lei (Chinese: 孫易磊; born 10 February 2005) is a Taiwanese professional baseball pitcher for the Hokkaido Nippon-Ham Fighters of Nippon Professional Baseball (NPB).

== Career ==
=== Hokkaido Nippon-Ham Fighters ===
On October 16, 2023, Sun signed with the Hokkaido Nippon-Ham Fighters a four-year contract worth around ¥90 million.

On May 22, 2025, Sun signed a first-team contract with the Fighters. On the same day, Sun made his professional debut against the Fukuoka SoftBank Hawks, pitching two scoreless innings of relief in a 4–3 loss. On May 27, Sun earned his first save in a 5–2 win over the Hawks.

On June 11, 2026, Sun earned his first professional win in his season-debut against the Yokohama DeNA BayStars, pitching six innings with eight strikeouts and two hits allowed. Sun's second win came against the Chiba Lotte Marines on August 29, where he pitched two innings and giving up one hit.

== International career ==
On November 6, 2023, Sun was selected to play for Chinese Taipei in the 2023 Asian Baseball Championship. On December 3, Sun pitched 2 scoreless innings in Chinese Taipei's 4–0 win over South Korea.

On February 3, 2025, Sun was selected to play in the 2026 World Baseball Classic qualifiers. Sun pitched 1.2 scoreless innings against Spain in the second-place playoff game, striking out 2 batters, helping Chinese Taipei qualify for the 2026 World Baseball Classic.

Sun was selected to play in the 2026 World Baseball Classic, where he pitched 0.2 innings, allowing 1 hit, walking 2, and striking out 1 in a 0–3 defeat against Australia. Sun pitched 1.2 innings against South Korea, striking out two, allowing a walk, a hit, and allowing one run.

== Personal life ==
Sun is of Amis descent, and is the younger brother of former TSG Hawks player Sun Yi-shen.

On August 21, 2026, Sun posted abusive messages he received through direct messages on Threads, sparking discussion about online harassment towards athletes.
