= Tomohisa Ohzeki =

Japanese baseball player (born 1997)

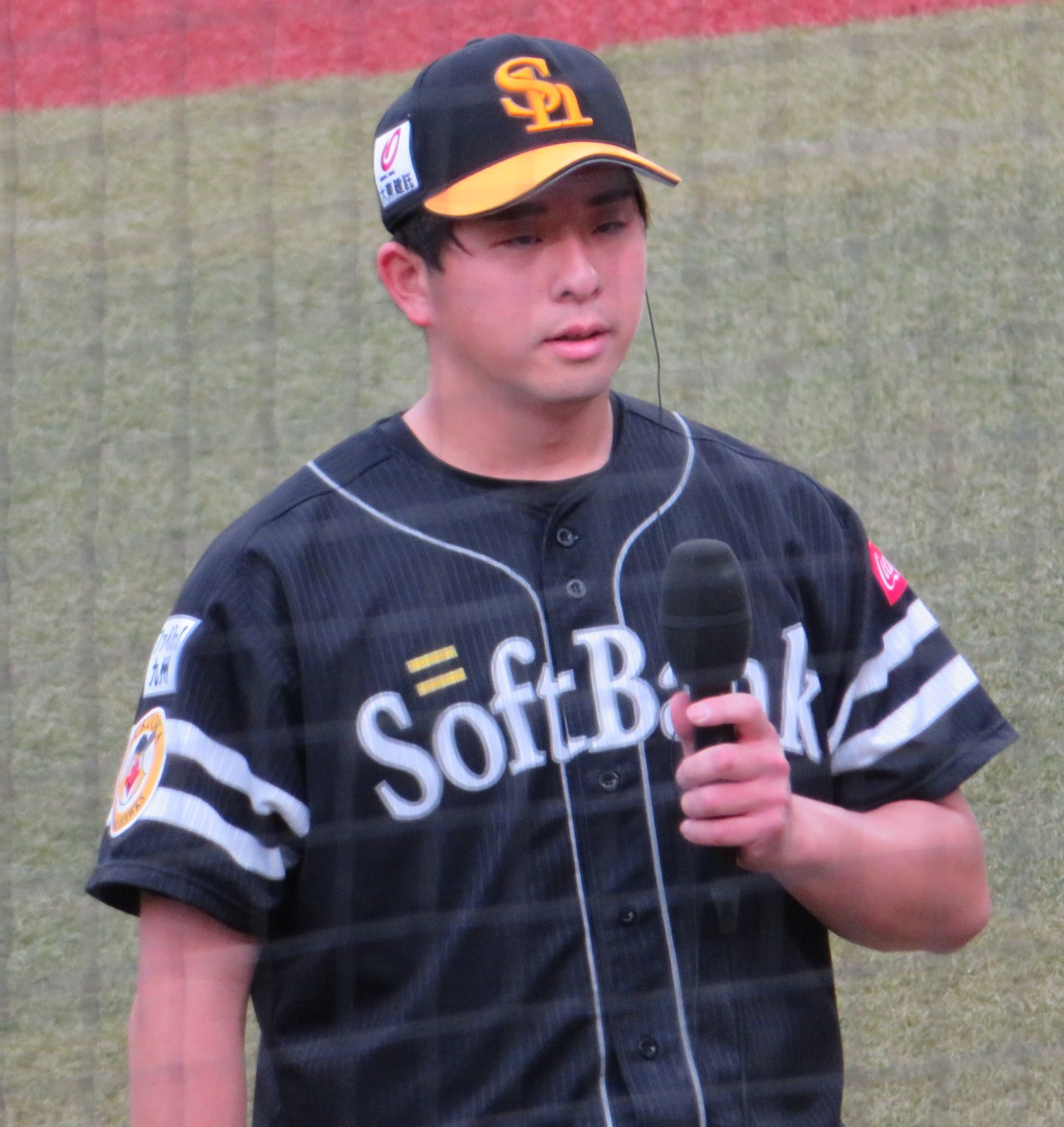
- Ohzeki with the Fukuoka SoftBank Hawks

Fukuoka SoftBank Hawks – No. 47
- Pitcher
- Born: December 14, 1997 (age 28); Tsuchiura, Ibaraki, Japan
- Bats: Left Throws: Left

NPB debut
- June 4, 2021, for the Fukuoka SoftBank Hawks

NPB statistics (through 2024 season)
- Win–loss record: 20-17
- ERA: 2.74
- Strikeouts: 236
- Stats at Baseball Reference

Teams
- Fukuoka SoftBank Hawks (2020–present)

Career highlights and awards
- NPB All-Star (2022); Japan Series champion (2025)

Tomohisa Ohzeki (大関 友久, Ōzeki Tomohisa; born December 14, 1997 in Tsuchiura, Ibaraki) is a Japanese professional baseball pitcher for the Fukuoka SoftBank Hawks of Nippon Professional Baseball (NPB).

== Professional career ==
On October 17, 2019, Ohzeki was drafted as a developmental player by the Fukuoka SoftBank Hawks in the 2019 Nippon Professional Baseball draft.

In 2020 season, he played in informal matches against the Shikoku Island League Plus's teams and amateur baseball teams, and played in the Western League of NPB second league.

On May 28, 2021, Ohzeki re-signed a 8 million yen contract with the Fukuoka SoftBank Hawks as a registered player under control. On June 4, he made his debut as a relief pitcher in the Interleague play against the Hanshin Tigers. In 2021 season, he finished the regular season with 12 Games pitched, a 0–0 Win–loss record, a 2.35 ERA, and a 13 strikeouts in 23 innings.

On March 31, 2022, Ohzeki pitched as a starting pitcher against the Chiba Lotte Marines and recorded his first win. On July 26, he participated the All-Star Game for the first time in My Navi All-Star Game 2022. Ohzeki was pitched as a starting pitcher from the opening, but on August 2, it was announced that he had undergone surgery to remove a tumor on his testicle, and he was recuperating. He is in good condition after surgery, and he pitched on September 25 for the first time in two months. In 2022 season, he finished the regular season with 21 Games pitched, a 7–6 Win–loss record, a 2.93 ERA, and a 70 strikeouts in 101.1 innings.

On March 31, 2023, Ohzeki pitched and won as the opening pitcher for the 2023 season. And he finished the regular season with a 17 Games pitched, a 5-7 Win–loss record, a 2.92 ERA, and a 76 strikeouts in 104.2 innings.

On December 13, 2023, announced that his uniform number would be changed from 42 to 47.
