= Shinya Matsuyama =

Japanese baseball player (born 2000)

Shinya Matsuyama 松山 晋也
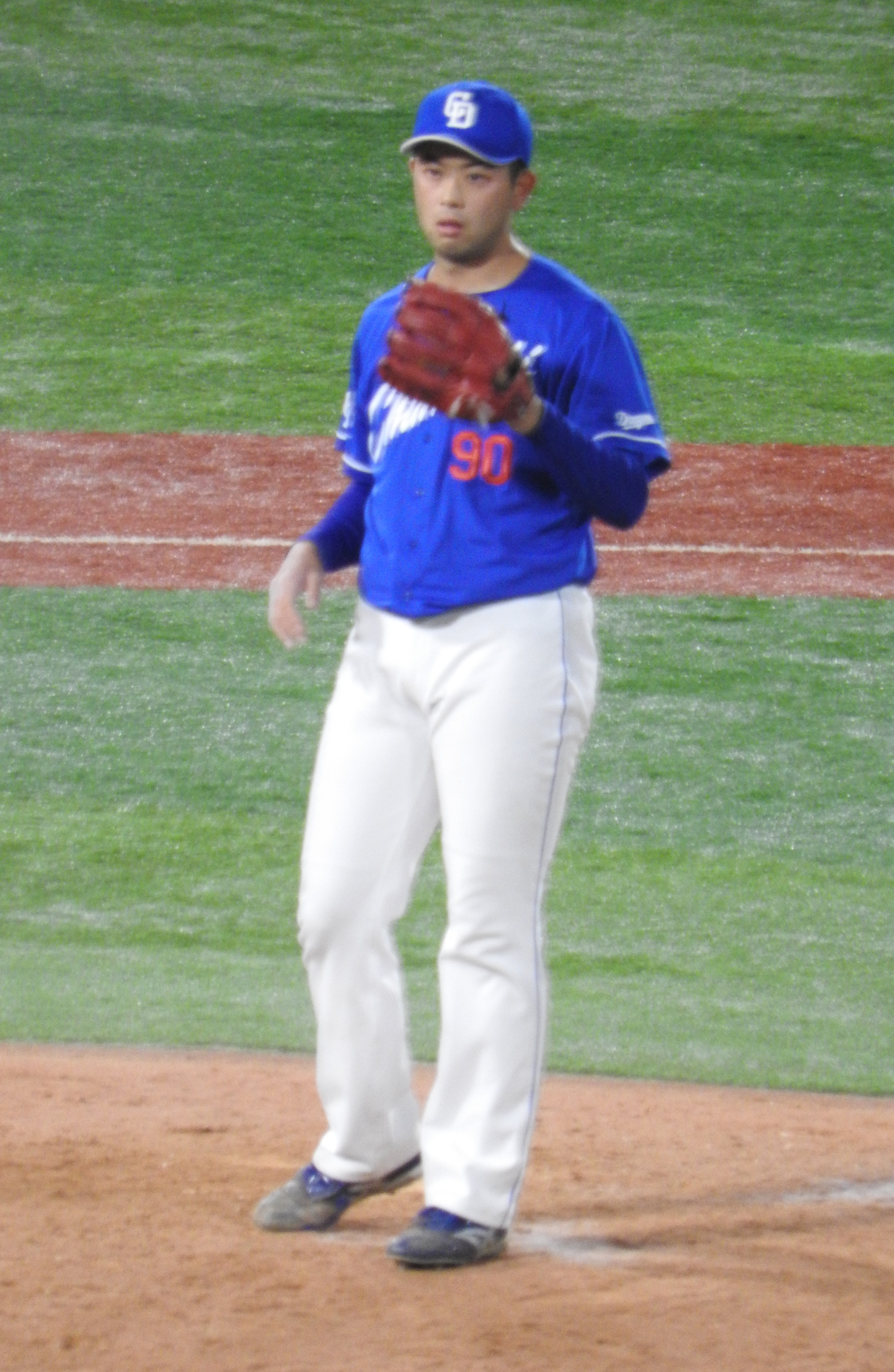

Chunichi Dragons – No. 90
- Relief pitcher
- Born: June 23, 2000 (age 26); Tenmabayashi, Aomori, Japan
- Bats: Right Throws: Right

NPB debut
- June 17, 2023, for the Chunichi Dragons

NPB statistics (through 2026)
- Win–loss record: 4-9
- Earned run average: 1.46
- Strikeouts: 226
- Saves: 77

Teams
- Chunichi Dragons (2023–present)

Career highlights and awards
- 3x NPB All-Star (2024-2026); Central League Most Valuable Setup pitcher (2024); Central League Saves Leader (2025)

Shinya Matsuyama (松山 晋也, Matsuyama Shinya; born June 23, 2000) is a Japanese professional baseball pitcher for the Chunichi Dragons of Nippon Professional Baseball (NPB).

== Early career ==
Matsuyama started playing rubber-ball while in grade two of Nanae Municipal Tenma West elementary school with the Tenma West Giants continuing through to middle school.

In the Aomori prefectural tournament during his senior year while at Hachinohe Gakuin Noheji-Nishi High School, Matsuyama would face off against Aomori Yamada High School's Kenshin Hotta (now Yomiuri Giants) in the second round where he would leave the game after earning 3 runs over 3 innings. As a result, he graduated high school with no kōshien experience.

His debut for Hachinohe Gakuin University would come in fall of his third year, making only 4 appearances in spring of his 4th year. In the fall of his 4th year, Matsuyama pitched 6 2/3 innings in relief in the second game of the season against Iwate University striking out 11, piquing the interest of scouts. He finished his college career making only 13 league appearances and claiming 2 wins.

On 18 November, at the 2022 NPB Draft, Matsuyama was selected by the Chunichi Dragons in the first round of the developmental draft and subsequently signed a ¥3,000,000 per year deal with a ¥30,000,000 signing bonus.

== Professional career ==
In the 2023 Western League season, Matsuyama pitched mostly as a closer, claiming 10 saves over 21 appearances for a 3.26 ERA which lead to his promotion to a first-team contract on the 5th of June. He received a ¥1.2M salary raise as a result.

The following day, he joined the first-team officially, and on the 17th of June made his first team debut against the Hokkaido Nippon Ham Fighters at Vantelin Dome Nagoya. In his debut, Matsuyama made an instant impact striking out three Fighters hitters in a row. After pitching in 9 games, 10 innings for 3 holds, 14 strikeouts and a 1.80 ERA, concerns over hip discomfort led to his demotion to the farm team on the 10th of July. He would return to action on the 26th of July on the farm and rejoined the first team on the 29th.

In August, Matsuyama was largely entrusted with throwing the 8th inning, and on the September 18th marked 19 consecutive games pitched without an earned run. At the end of the season, Matsuyama pitched in 36 games with 17 holds and 50 strikeouts for a 1.27 ERA. At the season's end, he received yet another pay raise, signing a new yearly salary package of ¥17,500,000 per year.

== Pitching style ==
Standing at 188cm tall, Matsuyama has an overarm action with a fastball that tops out at 155km/h (96mp/h). He also throws a curveball, cutter, splitter and a forkball.

== Personal ==
Matsuyama looks up to former Los Angeles Dodgers and New York Yankees starter Hiroki Kuroda. Upon being drafted, he made mention he most wanted to face his Hachnohe Gakuin University senior classman, Shogo Akiyama. On 9 June 2023, he would get his wish, striking out Akiyama on a forkball in a game against the Hiroshima Toyo Carp in Nagoya.
