= Keisuke Sawada =

Japanese baseball player (born 1994)

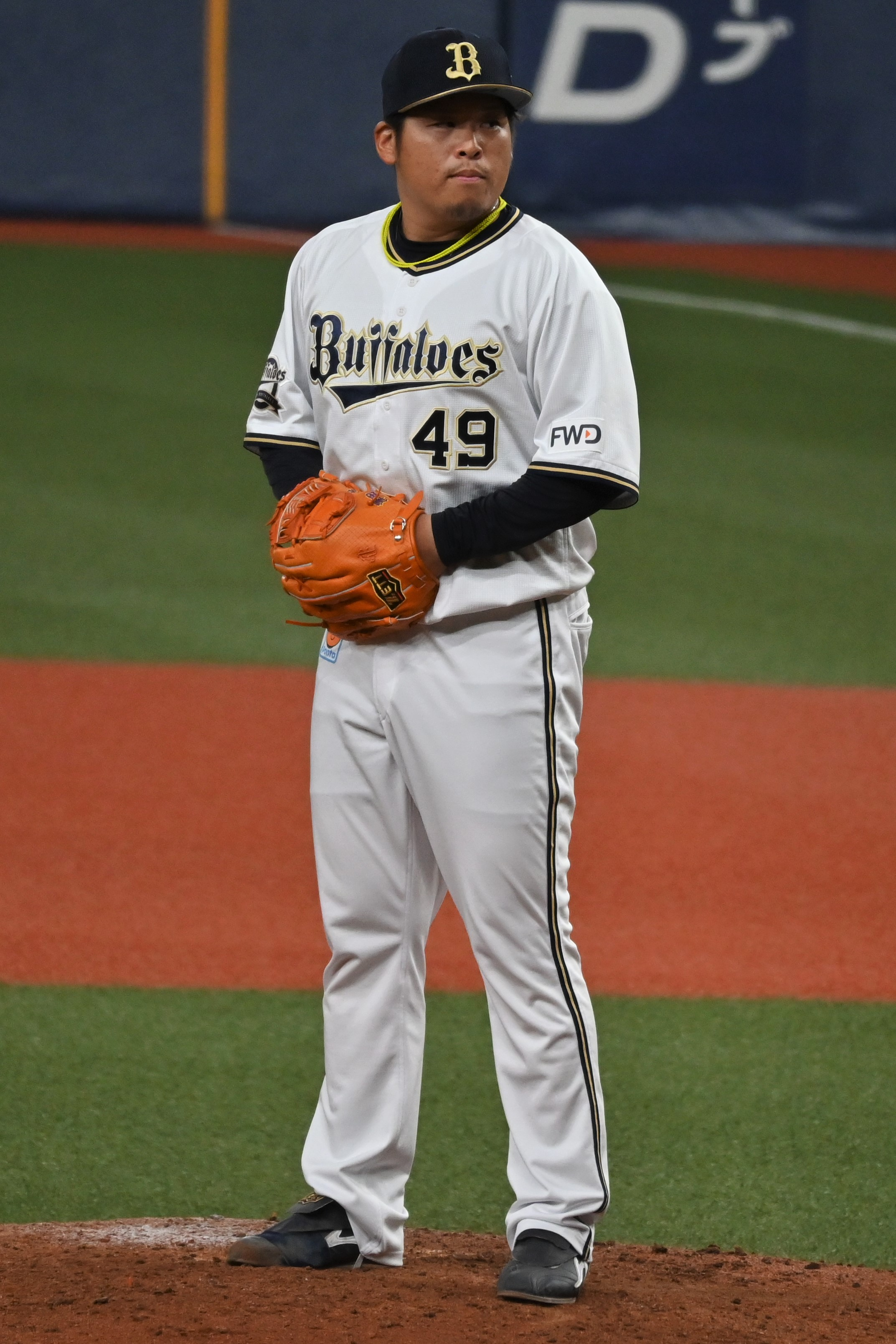

Chiba Lotte Marines – No. 54
- Pitcher
- Born: April 27, 1994 (age 31); Matsuyama, Ehime, Japan
- Bats: Right Throws: Right

NPB debut
- March 31, 2017, for the Orix Buffaloes

Career statistics (through 2024 season)
- Win–loss record: 11–7
- Earned Run Average: 3.26
- Strikeouts: 133
- Stats at Baseball Reference

Teams
- Orix Buffaloes (2017-2022); Chiba Lotte Marines (2023–present)

Keisuke Sawada (澤田 圭佑, Sawada Keisuke; born April 27, 1994) is a Japanese professional baseball pitcher for the Chiba Lotte Marines of the Nippon Professional Baseball (NPB). He has previously played in NPB for the Orix Buffaloes.
