= Kaima Taira =

Japanese baseball player (born 1999)

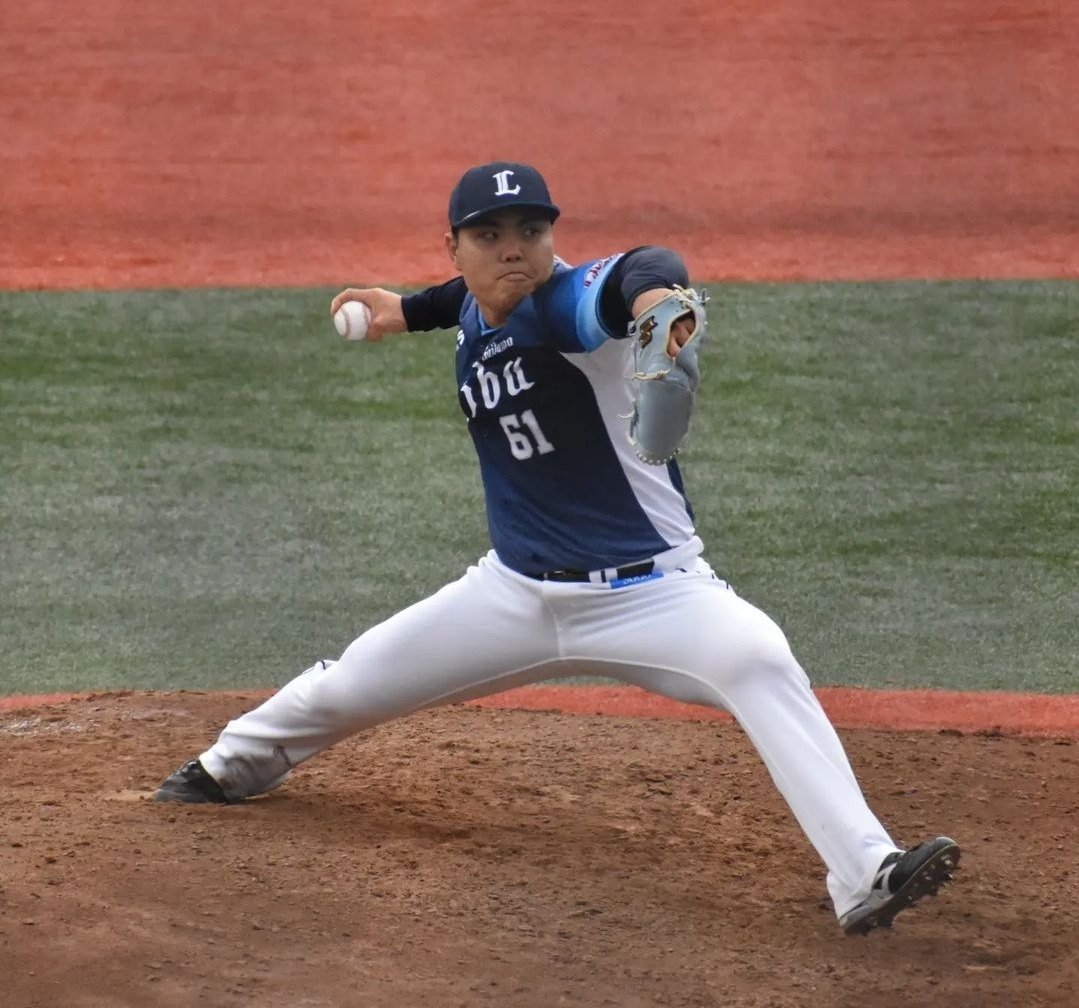
- Taira in 2022

Saitama Seibu Lions – No. 61
- Pitcher
- Born: November 15, 1999 (age 26); Ishigaki, Okinawa, Japan
- Bats: Left Throws: Right

NPB debut
- July 19, 2019, for the Saitama Seibu Lions

NPB statistics (through 2025 season)
- Win–loss record: 25–19
- Earned Run Average: 1.92
- Strikeouts: 479
- Saves: 62
- Stats at Baseball Reference

Teams
- Saitama Seibu Lions (2018–present)

Career highlights and awards
- Pacific League Rookie of the Year (2020); 4× NPB All-Star (2021–2023, 2025); Pitched a combined no-hitter (April 18, 2025); 20 holds and 20 saves in one season (2021); NPB records: 39 consecutive appearances without allowing a run
Medals
Men's baseball
Representing Japan
Summer Olympics
Gold medal – first place	2020 Tokyo	Team

Kaima Taira (平良 海馬, Taira Kaima; born November 15, 1999) is a Japanese professional baseball pitcher for the Saitama Seibu Lions of Nippon Professional Baseball (NPB).

== Career ==
Taira was drafted by the Saitama Seibu Lions with the team's fourth selection in the 2017 Nippon Professional Baseball (NPB) draft out of Yaeyama Commercial High School. Taira spent the 2018 season with Seibu's farm team, posting a 5.40 ERA in 10 appearances.

On July 19, 2019, Taira made his NPB debut. He finished this season with a 2–1 record and 3.38 ERA in 26 appearances. The following season, Taira played in 54 games for Seibu, posting a stellar 1.87 ERA in 53 innings of work. Because of his efforts, Taira was named the 2020 Pacific League Rookie of the Year.

On June 28, 2021, Taira tied the NPB record for consecutive mound appearances without giving up a run, with 38, a record also held by former Hanshin Tigers pitcher Kyuji Fujikawa. On July 1, Taira passed Fujikawa and set a new NPB record by making his 39th consecutive mound appearance without giving up a run. Taira's streak ended during his next appearance on July 6, when he allowed an RBI hit to Hokkaido Nippon-Ham Fighters hitter Yuto Takahama. In 2021, Taira was named an NPB All-Star for the first time in his career.

On April 18, 2025, Tatsuya Imai and Taira combined to no-hit the Fukuoka SoftBank Hawks at the Belluna Dome. Imai pitched the first eight innings, with Taira coming in the complete the no-hitter in the ninth inning.

On November 1, 2026, Taira was posted to Major League Baseball (MLB) by the Lions.
