= 2025 Nippon Professional Baseball season =

76th annual season of Nippon Professional Baseball

2025 NPB season
- League: Nippon Professional Baseball
- Sport: Baseball
- Duration: March 28 – October 5
- Games: 143
- Teams: 12
- Total attendance: 27,040,286

Central League pennant
- League champions: Hanshin Tigers
- Runners-up: Yokohama DeNA BayStars
- Season MVP: Teruaki Sato (Hanshin)

Pacific League pennant
- League champions: Fukuoka SoftBank Hawks
- Runners-up: Hokkaido Nippon-Ham Fighters
- Season MVP: Liván Moinelo (SoftBank)

Climax Series
- CL champions: Hanshin Tigers
- CL runners-up: Yokohama DeNA BayStars
- PL champions: Fukuoka SoftBank Hawks
- PL runners-up: Hokkaido Nippon-Ham Fighters

Japan Series
- Venue: Hanshin Koshien Stadium, Nishinomiya, Hyōgo; Mizuho PayPay Dome Fukuoka, Chūō-ku, Fukuoka
- Champions: Fukuoka SoftBank Hawks
- Runners-up: Hanshin Tigers
- Finals MVP: Hotaka Yamakawa (SoftBank)

NPB seasons
- ← 2024 2026 →

The 2025 Nippon Professional Baseball season was the 76th season of professional baseball in Japan since Nippon Professional Baseball (NPB) was reorganized in 1950. There were 12 NPB teams, split evenly between the Central League and Pacific League. The Yokohama DeNA BayStars entered the season as the defending champions.

The 12 clubs of NPB drew a total of over 27 million attendees or an average of 31,515 per game, setting a second consecutive year of new records for Japanese baseball attendance.

== Regular season standings ==
2025 Central League regular season standings
Pos	Team	G	W	L	T	Pct.	GB	Home	Road
1	Hanshin Tigers^{†}	143	85	54	4	.612	—	41–29–1	44–25–3
2	Yokohama DeNA BayStars*	143	71	66	6	.518	13	36–32–3	35–34–3
3	Yomiuri Giants*	143	70	69	4	.504	15	44–26–1	26–43–3
4	Chunichi Dragons	143	63	78	2	.447	23	35–36–1	28–42–1
5	Hiroshima Toyo Carp	143	59	79	5	.428	25½	37–32–3	22–47–2
6	Tokyo Yakult Swallows	143	57	79	7	.419	26½	32–35–5	25–44–2

2025 Pacific League regular season standings
Pos	Team	G	W	L	T	Pct.	GB	Home	Road
1	Fukuoka SoftBank Hawks^{†}	143	87	52	4	.626	—	44–24–3	43–28–1
2	Hokkaido Nippon-Ham Fighters*	143	83	57	3	.593	4½	43–28	40–29–3
3	Orix Buffaloes*	143	74	66	3	.529	13½	38–32–2	36–34–1
4	Tohoku Rakuten Golden Eagles	143	67	74	2	.475	21	35–36–1	32–38–1
5	Saitama Seibu Lions	143	63	77	3	.450	24½	35–34–2	28–43–1
6	Chiba Lotte Marines	143	56	84	3	.400	31½	33–38–1	23–46–2

^{†} League champion and advanced directly to the final stage of the Climax Series
* Advanced to the first stage of the Climax Series

=== Interleague ===
2025 regular season interleague standings
Pos	Team	G	W	L	T	Pct.	GB	Home	Road
1	Fukuoka SoftBank Hawks^{†}	18	12	5	1	.706	—	7–1–1	5–4
2	Hokkaido Nippon-Ham Fighters	18	11	7	0	.611	1½	6–3	5–4
3	Orix Buffaloes	18	11	7	0	.611	1½	7–2	4–5
4	Saitama Seibu Lions	18	10	8	0	.556	2½	7–2	3–6
5	Chiba Lotte Marines	18	10	8	0	.556	2½	7–2	3–6
6	Tohoku Rakuten Golden Eagles	18	9	8	1	.529	3	5–4	4–4–1
7	Hiroshima Toyo Carp	18	9	9	0	.500	3½	6–3	3–6
8	Hanshin Tigers	18	8	10	0	.444	4½	6–3	2–7
9	Chunichi Dragons	18	8	10	0	.444	4½	5–4	3–6
10	Yokohama DeNA BayStars	18	7	11	0	.389	5½	4–5	3–6
11	Yomiuri Giants	18	6	11	1	.353	6	5–4	1–7–1
12	Tokyo Yakult Swallows	18	5	12	1	.294	7	3–5−1	2–7

^{†} Interleague champion

== Climax Series ==
First stage
Central League
2	Yokohama DeNA BayStars	2
3	Yomiuri Giants	0
Pacific League
2	Hokkaido Nippon-Ham Fighters	2
3	Orix Buffaloes	0

Final stage
1	Hanshin Tigers	4
2	Yokohama DeNA BayStars	0
1	Fukuoka SoftBank Hawks	4
2	Hokkaido Nippon-Ham Fighters	3

Japan Series
CL1	Hanshin Tigers	1
PL1	Fukuoka SoftBank Hawks	4

=== First stage ===
==== Central League ====
DeNA won the series, 2–0.

Game	Date	Score	Location	Time	Attendance
1	October 11	Yomiuri Giants – 2, Yokohama DeNA BayStars – 6	Yokohama Stadium	2:54	33,783
2	October 12	Yomiuri Giants – 6, Yokohama DeNA BayStars – 7	Yokohama Stadium	4:31	33,767

==== Pacific League ====
Nippon-Ham won the series, 2–0.

Game	Date	Score	Location	Time	Attendance
1	October 11	Orix Buffaloes – 0, Hokkaido Nippon-Ham Fighters – 2	Es Con Field Hokkaido	2:52	34,165
2	October 12	Orix Buffaloes – 4, Hokkaido Nippon-Ham Fighters – 5	Es Con Field Hokkaido	3:20	35,024

=== Central League ===
Tigers won the series, 4–0.

Game	Date	Score	Location	Time	Attendance
1	October 15	Yokohama DeNA BayStars – 0, Hanshin Tigers – 2	Koshien Stadium	3:36	42,643
2	October 16	Yokohama DeNA BayStars – 3, Hanshin Tigers – 5 (10)	Koshien Stadium	4:30	42,647
3	October 17	Yokohama DeNA BayStars – 0, Hanshin Tigers – 4	Koshien Stadium	3:00	42,649

=== Pacific League ===
Hawks won the series, 4–3.

Game	Date	Score	Location	Time	Attendance
1	October 15	Hokkaido Nippon-Ham Fighters – 1, Fukuoka SoftBank Hawks – 2	Mizuho PayPay Dome Fukuoka	3:25	40,066
2	October 16	Hokkaido Nippon-Ham Fighters – 0, Fukuoka SoftBank Hawks – 3	Mizuho PayPay Dome Fukuoka	3:07	39,337
3	October 17	Hokkaido Nippon-Ham Fighters – 6, Fukuoka SoftBank Hawks – 0	Mizuho PayPay Dome Fukuoka	3:14	40,142
4	October 18	Hokkaido Nippon-Ham Fighters – 9, Fukuoka SoftBank Hawks – 3	Mizuho PayPay Dome Fukuoka	3:24	40,142
5	October 19	Hokkaido Nippon-Ham Fighters – 7, Fukuoka SoftBank Hawks – 1	Mizuho PayPay Dome Fukuoka	3:03	39,410
6	October 20	Hokkaido Nippon-Ham Fighters – 1, Fukuoka SoftBank Hawks – 2	Mizuho PayPay Dome Fukuoka	2:44	39,942

== 2025 Japan Series ==
Hawks won the series, 4–1.

Game	Date	Score	Location	Time	Attendance
1	October 25	Hanshin Tigers – 2, Fukuoka SoftBank Hawks – 1	Mizuho PayPay Dome Fukuoka	3:17	36,882
2	October 26	Hanshin Tigers – 1, Fukuoka SoftBank Hawks – 10	Mizuho PayPay Dome Fukuoka	3:13	36,910
3	October 28	Fukuoka SoftBank Hawks – 2, Hanshin Tigers – 1	Koshien Stadium	3:27	41,594
4	October 29	Fukuoka SoftBank Hawks – 3, Hanshin Tigers – 2	Koshien Stadium	3:30	41,591
5	October 30	Fukuoka SoftBank Hawks – 3, Hanshin Tigers – 2 (11)	Koshien Stadium	4:09	41,606

Note: All dates and times are in JST (Japan Standard Time).

== League leaders ==
(Updated through September 20)

=== Central League ===
Hitting leaders
Stat	Player	Total
AVG	Kaito Kozono (HIR)	.310
OPS	Teruaki Satō (HAN)	.930
HR	Teruaki Satō (HAN)	38
RBI	Teruaki Satō (HAN)	96
R	Shota Morishita (HAN)	80
H	Kaito Kozono (HIR)	158
SB	Kōji Chikamoto (HAN)	31

Pitching leaders
Stat	Player	Total
W	Katsuki Azuma (YKO)	14
L	Masato Morishita (HIR)	14
ERA	Daichi Ishii (HAN)	0.18
K	Shoki Murakami (HAN)	132
IP	Hiroki Tokoda (HIR)	168.2
SV	Raidel Martínez (YOM)	43
WHIP	Taichi Ishiyama (YKU)	0.69

=== Pacific League ===
Hitting leaders
Stat	Player	Total
AVG	Ryōma Nishikawa (ORX)	.312
OPS	Franmil Reyes (NPN)	.884
HR	Franmil Reyes (NPN)	32
RBI	Franmil Reyes (NPN)	86
R	Kotaro Kiyomiya (NPN); Franmil Reyes (NPN)	58
H	Itsuki Murabayashi (TOH)	138
SB	Ukyo Shuto (FKA)	34

Pitching leaders
Stat	Player	Total
W	Hiromi Itoh (NPN)	14
L	Ryota Takinaka (TOH); Chihiro Sumida (SEI); Austin Voth (LOT)	9
ERA	Naoto Nishiguchi (TOH)	0.94
K	Hiromi Itoh (NPN)	175
IP	Hiromi Itoh (NPN)	175.2
SV	Kaima Taira (SEI); Kazuki Sugiyama (FKA)	28
WHIP	Yuki Matsumoto (FKA)	0.79

== Awards and honors ==
The following players were bestowed awards ranging from the Best Nine to MVP on November 26

- Eiji Sawamura Award
  - Hiromi Itoh, Hokkaido Nippon-Ham Fighters
- Matsutaro Shoriki Award
  - Hiroki Kokubo, Fukuoka SoftBank Hawks
- Nippon Professional Baseball Comeback Player of the Year Award
  - Yūdai Ōno, Chunichi Dragons

=== Central League ===
Award	Player	Team
Most Valuable Player	Teruaki Sato	Hanshin Tigers
Rookie of the Year	Kota Shoji	Tokyo Yakult Swallows
Best Nine
Pitcher	Shoki Murakami	Hanshin Tigers
Catcher	Seishiro Sakamoto	Hanshin Tigers
First Base	Yusuke Ohyama	Hanshin Tigers
Second Base	Takumu Nakano	Hanshin Tigers
Third Base	Teruaki Sato	Hanshin Tigers
Shortstop	Yuta Izuguchi	Yomiuri Giants
Outfield	Yūki Okabayashi	Chunichi Dragons
Outfield	Koji Chikamoto	Hanshin Tigers
Outfield	Shota Morishita	Hanshin Tigers

=== Pacific League ===
Award	Player	Team
Most Valuable Player	Liván Moinelo	Fukuoka SoftBank Hawks
Rookie of the Year	Mishō Nishikawa	Chiba Lotte Marines
Best Nine
Pitcher	Livan Moinelo	Fukuoka SoftBank Hawks
Catcher	Kenya Wakatsuki	Orix Buffaloes
First Base	Tyler Nevin	Saitama Seibu Lions
Second Base	Taisei Makihara	Fukuoka SoftBank Hawks
Third Base	Itsuki Murabayashi	Tohoku Rakuten Golden Eagles
Shortstop	Rui Muneyama	Tohoku Rakuten Golden Eagles
Outfield	Ukyo Shuto	Fukuoka SoftBank Hawks
Outfield	Keita Nakagawa	Orix Buffaloes
Outfield	Tatsuru Yanagimachi	Fukuoka SoftBank Hawks
Designated Hitter	Franmil Reyes	Hokkaido Nippon-Ham Fighters

== Foreign player signings ==
The following list includes players formerly playing for other professional baseball leagues who signed with NPB teams during and prior to the 2025 season.

Date	Player	NPB team	Former team	Source
July 15, 2025	Shintaro Fujinami (RHP)	Yokohama DeNA BayStars	Seattle Mariners (MLB)	
July 14, 2025	Grant Hartwig (RHP)	Hanshin Tigers	New York Mets (MLB)	
July 11, 2025	Michael Chavis (IF)	Chunichi Dragons	Los Angeles Dodgers (MLB)	
July 11, 2025	J. D. Davis (IF)	Seibu Lions	Los Angeles Angels (MLB)	
June 22, 2025	Luke Voit (IF)	Tohoku Rakuten Golden Eagles	Tigres de Quintana Roo (LMB)	
May 22, 2025	Oscar Gonzalez (OF)	Tohoku Rakuten Golden Eagles	San Diego Padres (MLB)	
February 16, 2025	Pedro Avila (RHP)	Tokyo Yakult Swallows	Cleveland Guardians (MLB)	
February 9, 2025	Austin Voth (RHP)	Chiba Lotte Marines	Seattle Mariners (MLB)	
February 6, 2025	Yunior Marte (RHP)	Chunichi Dragons	Seattle Mariners (MLB)	
January 26, 2025	Trevor Bauer (RHP)	Yokohama DeNA BayStars	Diablos Rojos del Mexico (LMB)	
January 11, 2025	Edward Olivares (OF)	Orix Buffaloes	New York Mets (MLB)	
January 10, 2025	Jordan Díaz (IF)	Orix Buffaloes	Athletics (MLB)	
January 9, 2025	Tyler Nevin (IF)	Seibu Lions	Athletics (MLB)	
January 6, 2025	Trey Wingenter (RHP)	Seibu Lions	Chicago Cubs (MLB)	
December 20, 2024	Nick Nelson (RHP)	Hanshin Tigers	Philadelphia Phillies (MLB)	
December 18, 2024	Naoyuki Uwasawa (RHP)	SoftBank Hawks	Boston Red Sox (MLB)	
December 17, 2024	Trey Cabbage (1B/OF)	Yomiuri Giants	Pittsburgh Pirates (MLB)	
December 16, 2024	Jon Duplantier (RHP)	Hanshin Tigers	Milwaukee Brewers (MLB)	
December 15, 2024	Kyle Muller (LHP)	Chunichi Dragons	Athletics (MLB)	
December 14, 2024	Peter Lambert (RHP)	Yakult Swallows	Colorado Rockies (MLB)	
December 13, 2024	Bryan Sammons (LHP)	Chiba Lotte Marines	Detroit Tigers (MLB)	
December 10, 2024	Spencer Howard (RHP)	Rakuten Eagles	San Francisco Giants (MLB)	
December 9, 2024	Mike Baumann (RHP)	Yakult Swallows	Miami Marlins (MLB)	
December 4, 2024	Tayron Guerrero (RHP)	Chiba Lotte Marines	Los Angeles Angels (MLB)	
November 30, 2024	Emmanuel Ramirez (RHP)	Seibu Lions	Toronto Blue Jays (MLB)	
November 30, 2024	Jason Vosler (IF)	Chunichi Dragons	Seattle Mariners (MLB)	
November 20, 2024	Sandro Fabian (OF)	Hiroshima Toyo Carp	Texas Rangers (MLB)	
November 8, 2024	Elehuris Montero (IF)	Hiroshima Toyo Carp	Colorado Rockies (MLB)	

== See also ==
- 2025 Major League Baseball season
- 2025 KBO League season
- 2025 in baseball
