= 2022 Tohoku Rakuten Golden Eagles season =

Professional sports season in Nippon Professional Baseball

2022 Tohoku Rakuten Golden Eagles
- League: Pacific League
- Ballpark: Rakuten Seimei Park Miyagi
- Record: 69–71–3 (.493)
- League place: 4th
- Parent company: Rakuten
- President: Yosuke Yoneda
- General manager: Kazuhisa Ishii
- Manager: Kazuhisa Ishii
- Average attendance: 18,748

The 2022 Tohoku Rakuten Golden Eagles season was the 18th season of the Tohoku Rakuten Golden Eagles franchise. The Eagles played their home games at Rakuten Seimei Park Miyagi in the city of Sendai as members of Nippon Professional Baseball's Pacific League. The team led by Kazuhisa Ishii in his second season as team manager.

Rakuten finished the season with a record of 69–71–3, finishing in fourth place in the PL.

== Regular season ==
=== Standings ===
2022 Pacific League regular season standings
Pos	Team	G	W	L	T	Pct.	GB	Home	Road
1	Orix Buffaloes^{†}	143	76	65	2	.539	—	37–34	39–31–2
2	Fukuoka SoftBank Hawks*	143	76	65	2	.539	—	40–32	36–33–2
3	Saitama Seibu Lions*	143	72	68	3	.514	3½	41–29–2	31–39–1
**4**	**Tohoku Rakuten Golden Eagles**	**143**	**69**	**71**	**3**	**.493**	**6½**	**30–40–1**	**39–31–2**
5	Chiba Lotte Marines	143	69	73	1	.486	7½	34–36–1	35–37
6	Hokkaido Nippon-Ham Fighters	143	59	81	3	.421	16½	34–35–3	25–46

^{†} League champion and advanced directly to the final stage of the Climax Series
* Advanced to the first stage of the Climax Series

=== Record vs. opponents ===
2022 record vs. opponents
Team	Buffaloes	Eagles	Fighters	Hawks	Lions	Marines	CL
Buffaloes	—	11–13–1	15–9–1	15–10	11–14	16–9	8–10
**Eagles**	**13–11–1**	—	**16–9**	**10–15**	**9–15–1**	**12–12–1**	**9–9**
Fighters	9–15–1	9–16	—	11–13–1	11–13–1	11–14	8–10
Hawks	10–15	15–10	13–11–1	—	14–10–1	15–10	9–9
Lions	14–11	15–9–1	13–11–1	10–14–1	—	11–14	9–9
Marines	9–16	12–12–1	14–11	10–15	14–11	—	10–8

=== Interleague ===
2022 regular season interleague standings
Pos	Team	G	W	L	T	Pct.	GB	Home	Road
1	Tokyo Yakult Swallows^{†}	18	14	4	0	.778	—	7–2	7–2
2	Hanshin Tigers	18	12	6	0	.667	2	6–3	6–3
3	Chiba Lotte Marines	18	10	8	0	.556	4	6–3	4–5
4	Fukuoka SoftBank Hawks	18	9	9	0	.500	5	5–4	4–5
5	Saitama Seibu Lions	18	9	9	0	.500	5	6–3	3–6
6	Yokohama DeNA BayStars	18	9	9	0	.500	5	5–4	4–5
**7**	**Tohoku Rakuten Golden Eagles**	**18**	**9**	**9**	**0**	**.500**	**5**	**5–4**	**4–5**
8	Hokkaido Nippon-Ham Fighters	18	8	10	0	.444	6	6–3	2–7
9	Orix Buffaloes	18	8	10	0	.444	6	2–7	6–3
10	Yomiuri Giants	18	8	10	0	.444	6	5–4	3–6
11	Chunichi Dragons	18	7	11	0	.389	7	5–4	2–7
12	Hiroshima Toyo Carp	18	5	13	0	.279	9	3–6	2–7

^{†} Interleague champion

=== Chihō ballparks ===
The Eagles hosted three home games outside of Rakuten Seimei Park Miyagi in 2022. They were played at chihō, or "countryside", ballparks in Aomori, Iwate, and Akita Prefectures in Japan's Tōhoku region

2022 Rakuten Eagles chihō ballparks
Ballpark	City	Prefecture
Haruka Yume Stadium	Hirosaki	Aomori Prefecture
Iwate Prefectural Baseball Stadium	Morioka	Iwate Prefecture
Komachi Stadium	Akita	Akita Prefecture

=== Opening Day starting roster ===
Friday, March 25, 2022 vs. Chiba Lotte Marines

2022 Rakuten Eagles Opening Day starting roster
Order	Player	Position
1	Haruki Nishikawa	Left fielder
2	Tsuyoshi Yamasaki	Shortstop
3	Hideto Asamura	Second baseman
4	Hiroaki Shimauchi	Right fielder
5	Eigoro Mogi	Third baseman
6	Ren Wada	Designated hitter
7	Daichi Suzuki	First baseman
8	Yuma Yasuda	Catcher
9	Hiroto Kobukata	Center fielder
—	Takahiro Norimoto	Starting pitcher

=== Game log ===
2022 game log: 69–71–3 (Home: 30–40–1; Away: 39–31–2)
March/April: 16–6–1 (Home: 6–3–0; Away: 10–3–1)

#	Date	Opponent	Score	Win	Loss	Save	Stadium	Attendance	Record	Streak
1	March 25	Marines	0–4	Ishikawa (1–0)	**Norimoto** (0–1)	—	Rakuten Seimei Park	20,564	0–1–0	L1
—	March 26	Marines	Postponed (rain) – Makeup date: August 4				Rakuten Seimei Park	—	—	—
2	March 27	Marines	6–5 (11)	**Y. Matsui** (1–0)	Suzuki (0–1)	—	Rakuten Seimei Park	19,903	1–1–0	W1
3	March 29	@ Buffaloes	2–1	**M. Tanaka** (1–0)	Kuroki (0–1)	**Y. Matsui** (1)	Kyocera Dome	26,237	2–1–0	W2
4	March 30	@ Buffaloes	6–1	**Hayakawa** (1–0)	Vargas (0–1)	—	Kyocera Dome	17,835	3–1–0	W3
5	March 31	@ Buffaloes	6–1	**Nishiguchi** (1–0)	Yo. Hirano (0–1)	**Y. Matsui** (2)	Kyocera Dome	15,111	4–1–0	W4
6	April 1	Hawks	0–1	Senga (1–0)	**Wakui** (0–1)	Mori (5)	Rakuten Seimei Park	15,111	4–2–0	L1
—	April 2	Hawks	Postponed (COVID-19) – Makeup date: August 25				Rakuten Seimei Park	—	—	—
—	April 3	Hawks	Postponed (COVID-19) – Makeup date: September 29				Rakuten Seimei Park	—	—	—
7	April 5	Lions	7–3	**M. Tanaka** (2–0)	Sato (1–1)	—	Rakuten Seimei Park	16,893	5–2–0	W1
8	April 6	Lions	7–2	**Kishi** (1–0)	Matsumoto (1–1)	—	Rakuten Seimei Park	16,870	6–2–0	W2
9	April 8	@ Fighters	3–0	**Hayakawa** (2–0)	Itoh (0–2)	**Y. Matsui** (3)	Sapporo Dome	9,854	7–2–0	W3
10	April 9	@ Fighters	8–5	**Wakui** (1–1)	Kawano (0–2)	—	Sapporo Dome	13,994	8–2–0	W4
11	April 10	@ Fighters	2–3 (10)	Kitayama (2–0)	**Y. Matsui** (1–1)	—	Sapporo Dome	12,141	8–3–0	L1
—	April 12	Buffaoles	Postponed (COVID-19) – Makeup date: September 12				Rakuten Seimei Park	—	—	—
—	April 13	Buffaoles	Postponed (COVID-19) – Makeup date: September 13				Rakuten Seimei Park	—	—	—
—	April 14	Buffaoles	Postponed (COVID-19) – Makeup date: October 2				Rakuten Seimei Park	—	—	—
12	April 16	@ Hawks	6–5	**Anraku** (1–0)	Mori (0–3)	**Y. Matsui** (4)	Kitakyushu Stadium	18,709	9–3–0	W1
13	April 17	@ Hawks	14–4	**Takinaka** (1–0)	Higashihama (1–1)	—	Heiwa Lease Stadium	17,796	10–3–0	W2
14	April 19	Fighters	0–2	Kato (2–1)	**M. Tanaka** (2–1)	—	Rakuten Seimei Park	15,119	10–4–0	L1
15	April 20	Fighters	4–2	**Kishi** (2–0)	Ponce (0–1)	**Y. Matsui** (5)	Rakuten Seimei Park	14,453	11–4–0	W1
16	April 21	Fighters	8–5	**Ishibashi** (1–0)	Tateno (1–2)	**Y. Matsui** (6)	Rakuten Seimei Park	15,131	12–4–0	W2
17	April 22	@ Lions	0–3	K. Takahashi (2–2)	**Hayakawa** (2–1)	Taira (1)	Belluna Dome	10,224	12–5–0	L1
18	April 23	@ Lions	7–3	**Wakui** (2–1)	Sumida (1–3)	—	Belluna Dome	26,257	13–5–0	W1
19	April 24	@ Lions	3–6	Hirai (2–1)	**Takinaka** (1–1)	—	Belluna Dome	14,901	13–6–0	L1
20	April 26	@ Marines	3–2 (10)	**Anraku** (2–0)	Tojo (0–1)	**Y. Matsui** (7)	Zozo Marine Stadium	15,524	14–6–0	W1
21	April 27	@ Marines	3–3	Game tied after 12 innings			Zozo Marine Stadium	13,258	14–6–1	T1
22	April 28	@ Marines	2–1	**Fujii** (1–0)	Mima (0–3)	**Anraku** (1)	Zozo Marine Stadium	17,531	15–6–1	W1
—	April 29	Hawks	Postponed (rain) – Makeup date: September 30				Rakuten Seimei Park	—	—	—
23	April 30	Hawks (11)	7–6	**Anraku** (3–0)	Tsumori (1–1)	—	Rakuten Seimei Park	25,602	16–6–1	W2

May: 13–13–0 (Home:3–7–0; Away: 10–6–0)

#	Date	Opponent	Score	Win	Loss	Save	Stadium	Attendance	Record	Streak
24	May 1	Hawks	2–1 (6)	**Norimoto** (1–1)	Ohzeki (2–2)	**Yuge** (1)	Rakuten Seimei Park	24,250	17–6–1	W3
25	May 3	@ Fighters	2–1	**M. Tanaka** (3–1)	Kato (2–2)	**Y. Matsui** (8)	Sapporo Dome	20,087	18–6–1	W4
26	May 4	@ Fighters	5–1	**Wakui** (3–1)	Kaneko (0–1)	—	Sapporo Dome	20,184	19–6–1	W5
27	May 5	@ Fighters	8–4	**Kishi** (3–0)	Itoh (3–3)	—	Sapporo Dome	16,420	20–6–1	W6
28	May 6	@ Buffaloes	3–2	**Busenitz** (1–0)	Yo. Hirano (2–2)	**Y. Matsui** (9)	Kyocera Dome	16,430	21–6–1	W7
29	May 7	@ Buffaloes	7–1	**Hayakawa** (3–1)	Yamasaki (0–4)	—	Kyocera Dome	18,340	22–6–1	W8
30	May 8	@ Buffaloes	2–1 (10)	**Sung** (1–0)	Kuroki (0–2)	**Y. Matsui** (10)	Kyocera Dome	16,296	23–6–1	W9
31	May 10	Marines	7–0	**M. Tanaka** (4–1)	Ojima (0–4)	—	Rakuten Seimei Park	22,005	24–6–1	W10
32	May 11	Marines	1–3	Kawamura (2–0)	**Fujii** (1–1)	Masuda (5)	Rakuten Seimei Park	23,110	24–7–1	L1
33	May 12	Marines	2–5	Mima (1–4)	**Kishi** (3–1)	Masuda (6)	Rakuten Seimei Park	20,089	24–8–1	L2
34	May 13	@ Lions	2–4	K. Takahashi (4–2)	**Takinaka** (1–2)	Masuda (8)	Belluna Dome	10,121	24–9–1	L3
35	May 14	@ Lions	4–5	Moriwaki (1–0)	**Anraku** (3–1)	Masuda (9)	Belluna Dome	12,091	24–10–1	L4
36	May 15	@ Lions	3–1	**Norimoto** (2–1)	Enns (2–2)	**Y. Matsui** (11)	Belluna Dome	21,224	25–10–1	W1
37	May 17	@ Marines	3–6	C. Sasaki (1–0)	**M. Tanaka** (4–2)	Masuda (7)	Zozo Marine Stadium	21,001	25–11–1	L1
38	May 18	@ Marines	0–1 (10)	Tojo (1–1)	**Sakai** (0–1)	—	Zozo Marine Stadium	20,084	25–12–1	L2
39	May 19	@ Marines	7–2	**Kishi** (4–1)	C. Sasaki (1–1)	—	Zozo Marine Stadium	19,930	26–12–1	W1
40	May 20	Buffaloes	0–1	Tajima (1–2)	**Takinaka** (1–3)	Yo. Hirano (13)	Rakuten Seimei Park	17,239	26–13–1	L1
41	May 21	Buffaloes	0–6	Yamamoto (5–2)	**Hayakawa** (3–2)	—	Rakuten Seimei Park	18,306	26–14–1	L2
42	May 22	Buffaloes	0–6	Miyagi (3–2)	**Norimoto** (2–2)	—	Rakuten Seimei Park	17,896	26–15–1	L3
43	May 24	@ Tigers	0–1	Y. Nishi (3–3)	**M. Tanaka** (4–3)	Iwazaki (7)	Koshien Stadium	33,186	26–16–1	L4
44	May 25	@ Tigers	6–1	**Karashima** (1–0)	J. Nishi (2–1)	—	Koshien Stadium	31,493	27–16–1	W1
45	May 26	@ Tigers	1–0	**Sung** (2–0)	Iwazaki (1–2)	**Y. Matsui** (12)	Koshien Stadium	26,255	28–16–1	W2
46	May 27	Swallows	1–8	Takahashi (4–1)	**Takinaka** (1–4)	—	Rakuten Seimei Park	17,688	28–17–1	L1
47	May 28	Swallows	4–11	Kizawa (3–1)	**Hayakawa** (3–3)	—	Rakuten Seimei Park	23,629	28–18–1	L2
48	May 29	Swallows	3–1	**Norimoto** (3–2)	Ishikawa (2–3)	**Y. Matsui** (13)	Rakuten Seimei Park	22,534	29–18–1	W1
49	May 31	@ Dragons	0–2	Ogasawara (3–3)	**M. Tanaka** (4–4)	R. Martínez (13)	Vantelin Dome	18,827	29–19–1	L1

June: 9–12–0 (Home:6–5–0; Away: 3–7–0)

#	Date	Opponent	Score	Win	Loss	Save	Stadium	Attendance	Record	Streak
50	June 1	@ Dragons	2–0	**Karashima** (2–0)	Ueda (0–2)	**Y. Matsui** (14)	Vantelin Dome	16,536	30–19–1	W1
51	June 2	@ Dragons	2–3	Matsuba (3–1)	**Kishi** (4–2)	R. Martínez (14)	Vantelin Dome	16,214	30–20–1	L1
52	June 3	@ BayStars	0–7	Ohnuki (4–2)	**Takinaka** (1–5)	—	Yokohama Stadium	26,201	30–21–1	L2
53	June 4	@ BayStars	1–6	Kriske (1–1)	**Sung** (2–1)	—	Yokohama Stadium	31,130	30–22–1	L3
54	June 5	@ BayStars	6–5	**Anraku** (4–1)	Yamasaki (0–2)	**Y. Matsui** (15)	Yokohama Stadium	27,125	31–22–1	W1
55	June 7	Carp	1–3	Tokoda (6–3)	**M. Tanaka** (4–5)	Kuribayashi (12)	Rakuten Seimei Park	14,558	31–23–1	L1
56	June 8	Carp	1–0 (10)	**Sung** (3–1)	Matsumoto (0–1)	—	Rakuten Seimei Park	15,044	32–23–1	W1
57	June 9	Carp	4–1	**Kishi** (5–2)	Kuri (3–4)	**Y. Matsui** (16)	Rakuten Seimei Park	15,186	33–23–1	W2
58	June 10	Giants	1–4	Togo (7–3)	**Fujii** (1–1)	—	Rakuten Seimei Park	19,259	33–24–1	L1
59	June 11	Giants	8–1	**Hayakawa** (4–3)	Mercedes (5–2)	—	Rakuten Seimei Park	25,585	34–24–1	W1
60	June 12	Giants	9–2	**Norimoto** (4–2)	I. Yamasaki (2–3)	—	Rakuten Seimei Park	22,870	35–24–1	W2
61	June 17	@ Hawks	4–9	Senga (4–2)	**M. Tanaka** (4–6)	—	PayPay Dome	31,322	35–25–1	L1
62	June 18	@ Hawks	1–3 (10)	Matayoshi (2–3)	**Y. Matsui** (1–2)	—	PayPay Dome	31,057	35–26–1	L2
63	June 19	@ Hawks	1–4	Wada (2–1)	**Hayakawa** (4–4)	Moinelo (10)	PayPay Dome	31,595	35–27–1	L3
64	June 21	Fighters	3–0	**Norimoto** (5–2)	Yoshida (1–2)	**Y. Matsui** (17)	Komachi Stadium	17,128	36–27–1	W1
65	June 22	Fighters	6–3	**Nishiguchi** (2–0)	Kitayama (3–5)	—	Iwate Stadium	15,585	37–27–1	W2
66	June 24	Lions	3–4	K. Takahashi (6–6)	**M. Tanaka** (4–7)	Masuda (19)	Rakuten Seimei Park	18,045	37–28–1	L1
67	June 25	Lions	0–2	Hirai (4–4)	**Karashima** (2–1)	Masuda (20)	Rakuten Seimei Park	24,914	37–29–1	L2
68	June 26	Lions	0–2	Yoza (5–2)	**Hayakawa** (4–5)	Moriwaki (1)	Rakuten Seimei Park	22,367	37–30–1	L3
69	June 28	@ Buffaloes	4–2	**Norimoto** (6–2)	Miyagi (6–4)	**Y. Matsui** (18)	Hotto Motto Field	16,961	38–30–1	W1
70	June 29	@ Buffaloes	1–6	Tajima (4–3)	**Kishi** (5–3)	—	Hotto Motto Field	17,093	38–31–1	L1

July: 8–12–1 (Home:5–6–0; Away: 3–6–1)

#	Date	Opponent	Score	Win	Loss	Save	Stadium	Attendance	Record	Streak
71	July 1	@ Marines	4–6	Guerrero (2–2)	**Sung** (3–2)	Masuda (18)	Zozo Marine Stadium	20,194	38–32–1	L2
72	July 2	@ Marines	1–3	Osuna (2–0)	**S. Suzuki** (0–1)	Masuda (19)	Zozo Marine Stadium	19,090	38–33–1	L3
73	July 3	@ Marines	14–1	**Hayakawa** (5–5)	Mima (4–5)	—	Zozo Marine Stadium	17,389	39–33–1	W1
74	July 5	Hawks	2–6	Ohzeki (6–3)	**Norimoto** (6–3)	—	Haruka Yume Stadium	10,191	39–34–1	L1
75	July 7	Hawks	5–2	**Kishi** (6–3)	K. Otake (0–2)	**Y. Matsui** (19)	Rakuten Seimei Park	20,058	40–34–1	W1
76	July 8	Lions	4–8	Mizukami (2–1)	**S. Suzuki** (0–2)	—	Rakuten Seimei Park	22,605	40–35–1	L1
77	July 9	Lions	3–6	Mizukami (3–1)	**S. Suzuki** (0–3)	Masuda (22)	Rakuten Seimei Park	19,969	40–36–1	L2
78	July 10	Lions	3–6	Yoza (6–3)	**Hayakawa** (5–6)	—	Rakuten Seimei Park	21,791	40–37–1	L3
79	July 13	@ Fighters	2–3	Ponce (1–1)	**Norimoto** (6–4)	Hori (3)	Kusanagi Stadium	12,535	40–38–1	L4
80	July 14	@ Fighters	0–6	Kato (4–4)	**Kishi** (6–4)	—	Kusanagi Stadium	10,449	40–39–1	L5
81	July 16	Buffaloes	7–3	**M. Tanaka** (5–7)	Yamamoto (6–4)	—	Rakuten Seimei Park	18,730	41–39–1	W1
82	July 17	Buffaloes	3–7	Tajima (6–3)	**Karashima** (2–2)	Yo. Hirano (23)	Rakuten Seimei Park	18,158	41–40–1	L1
83	July 18	Buffaloes	8–3	**Sung** (4–2)	Suzuki (0–1)	—	Rakuten Seimei Park	17,774	42–40–1	W1
84	July 20	@ Hawks	17–3	**Takinaka** (2–5)	Ohzeki (6–5)	—	Kitakyushu Stadium	16,725	43–40–1	W2
85	July 21	@ Hawks	0–7	Senga (8–3)	**Kishi** (6–5)	—	PayPay Dome	29,254	43–41–1	L1
86	July 22	@ Lions	4–9	Y. Watanabe (1–1)	**Norimoto** (6–5)	—	Belluna Dome	19,546	43–42–1	L2
87	July 23	@ Lions	3–3	Game tied after 12 innings			Belluna Dome	26,641	43–42–2	T1
88	July 24	@ Lions	9–2	**Karashima** (3–2)	Hirai (5–5)	—	Belluna Dome	13,973	44–42–2	W1
All-Star Break: PL defeats the CL, 2–0
89	July 29	Fighters	1–2	Ponce (2–2)	**Takinaka** (2–6)	Kitaura (1)	Rakuten Seimei Park	21,057	44–43–2	L1
90	July 30	Fighters	7–0	**M. Tanaka** (6–7)	Tanaka (1–2)	—	Rakuten Seimei Park	26,136	45–43–2	W1
91	July 31	Fighters	10–5	**Ishibashi** (2–0)	Miyanishi (0–3)	—	Rakuten Seimei Park	20,105	46–43–2	W2

August: 12–14–0 (Home:6–8–0; Away: 6–6–0)

#	Date	Opponent	Score	Win	Loss	Save	Stadium	Attendance	Record	Streak
92	August 2	Marines	4–6	Romero (8–5)	**Norimoto** (6–6)	Masuda (24)	Rakuten Seimei Park	16,560	46–44–2	L1
93	August 3	Marines	5–4	**Sakai** (1–1)	R. Sasaki (6–2)	**Y. Matsui** (20)	Rakuten Seimei Park	15,717	47–44–2	W1
94	August 4	Marines	10–1	**Kishi** (7–5)	Motomae (3–2)	—	Rakuten Seimei Park	15,038	48–44–2	W2
95	August 5	@ Hawks	3–7	Matsumoto (4–0)	**Takinaka** (2–7)	—	PayPay Dome	27,439	48–45–2	L1
96	August 6	@ Hawks	1–9	Takeda (1–0)	**M. Tanaka** (6–8)	—	PayPay Dome	29,578	48–46–2	L2
97	August 7	@ Hawks	7–2	**Miyamori** (1–0)	Wada (3–3)	—	PayPay Dome	29,544	49–46–2	W1
98	August 9	@ Buffaloes	1–5	Tajima (8–3)	**Norimoto** (6–7)	—	Kyocera Dome	16,347	49–47–2	L1
99	August 10	@ Buffaloes	2–1 (10)	**Nishiguchi** (3–0)	Waguespack (2–6)	**Y. Matsui** (21)	Kyocera Dome	17,766	50–47–2	W1
100	August 11	@ Buffaloes	1–6	Miyagi (7–6)	**Yuge** (1–0)	—	Kyocera Dome	24,037	50–48–2	L1
101	August 12	Lions	1–5	Imai (3–1)	**Kishi** (7–6)	—	Rakuten Seimei Park	21,128	50–49–2	L2
102	August 13	Lions	4–6	Yoza (9–3)	**M. Tanaka** (6–9)	Smith (1)	Rakuten Seimei Park	19,659	50–50–2	L3
103	August 14	Lions	4–3	**Nishiguchi** (4–0)	Mizukami (4–3)	**Y. Matsui** (22)	Rakuten Seimei Park	19,366	51–50–2	W1
104	August 16	@ Fighters	2–1	**Norimoto** (7–7)	Nemoto (2–3)	**Y. Matsui** (23)	Sapporo Dome	17,859	52–50–2	W2
105	August 17	@ Fighters	8–2	**Karashima** (4–2)	Uehara (3–4)	—	Sapporo Dome	17,341	53–50–2	W3
106	August 18	@ Fighters	2–1	**Busenitz** (2–0)	Itoh (9–8)	**Y. Matsui** (24)	Sapporo Dome	17,632	54–50–2	W4
107	August 19	Marines	5–6	R. Sasaki (7–3)	**Kishi** (7–7)	Osuna (2)	Rakuten Seimei Park	21,215	54–51–2	L1
108	August 20	Marines	5–2	**M. Tanaka** (7–9)	Romero (8–7)	**Y. Matsui** (25)	Rakuten Seimei Park	22,874	55–51–2	W1
109	August 21	Marines	1–0	**Fujihira** (1–0)	Ojima (2–9)	**Y. Matsui** (26)	Rakuten Seimei Park	18,449	56–51–2	W2
110	August 23	Hawks	6–15	Ishikawa (5–7)	**Norimoto** (7–8)	—	Rakuten Seimei Park	16,801	56–52–2	L1
111	August 24	Hawks	3–4 (11)	Kaino (1–0)	**Busenitz** (2–1)	Tsumori (1)	Rakuten Seimei Park	16,259	56–53–2	L2
112	August 25	Hawks	7–5	**S. Suzuki** (1–3)	Bandoh (1–1)	**Y. Matsui** (27)	Rakuten Seimei Park	14,312	57–53–2	W1
113	August 26	@ Marines	0–2	R. Sasaki (8–3)	**Kishi** (7–8)	Osuna (4)	Zozo Marine Stadium	24,313	57–54–2	L1
114	August 27	@ Marines	11–3	**M. Tanaka** (8–9)	Romero (8–8)	—	Zozo Marine Stadium	25,912	58–54–2	W1
115	August 28	@ Marines	2–9	Ojima (3–9)	**Hayakawa** (5–7)	—	Zozo Marine Stadium	26,771	58–55–2	L1
116	August 30	Buffaloes	3–4	Higa (4–0)	**Y. Matsui** (1–3)	Yo. Hirano (28)	Rakuten Seimei Park	18,901	58–56–2	L2
117	August 31	Buffaloes	3–8	Tajima (9–3)	**Karashima** (4–3)	—	Rakuten Seimei Park	13,017	58–57–2	L3

September/October: 11–14–1 (Home:4–11–1; Away: 7–3–0)

#	Date	Opponent	Score	Win	Loss	Save	Stadium	Attendance	Record	Streak
118	September 1	Buffaloes	11–8	**Anraku** (5–1)	Biddle (4–5)	**Y. Matsui** (28)	Rakuten Seimei Park	12,187	59–57–2	W1
119	September 2	Fighters	1–3	Itoh (10–9)	**Kishi** (7–9)	N. Ishikawa (4)	Rakuten Seimei Park	15,068	59–58–2	L1
120	September 3	Fighters	5–4 (10)	**Anraku** (6–1)	Hori (1–3)	—	Rakuten Seimei Park	21,625	60–58–2	W1
121	September 4	Fighters	2–8	Kato (6–6)	**Hayakawa** (5–8)	—	Rakuten Seimei Park	18,748	60–59–2	L1
122	September 6	@ Hawks	2–4	Wada (5–4)	**Takinaka** (2–8)	Moinelo (20)	PayPay Dome	25,851	60–60–2	L2
123	September 7	@ Hawks	4–3	**Karashima** (5–3)	Ishikawa (5–9)	**Y. Matsui** (29)	PayPay Dome	28,441	61–60–2	W1
124	September 8	@ Hawks	7–3	**Wakui** (4–1)	Rea (5–5)	—	PayPay Dome	30,452	62–60–2	W2
125	September 10	Marines	4–6	Nishino (2–2)	**M. Tanaka** (8–10)	Osuna (7)	Rakuten Seimei Park	19,274	62–61–2	L1
126	September 11	Marines	3–2	**Kishi** (8–9)	Karakawa (2–1)	**Y. Matsui** (30)	Rakuten Seimei Park	20,657	63–61–2	W1
127	September 12	Buffaloes	8–2	**Norimoto** (8–8)	Miyagi (10–7)	—	Rakuten Seimei Park	14,115	64–61–2	W2
128	September 13	Buffaloes	3–3	Game tied after 12 innings			Rakuten Seimei Park	12,715	64–61–3	T1
129	September 15	Hawks	3–7	Wada (6–4)	**Karashima** (5–4)	—	Rakuten Seimei Park	15,078	64–62–3	L1
130	September 16	Hawks	2–6	Kaino (2–0)	**Wakui** (4–2)	—	Rakuten Seimei Park	16,336	64–63–3	L2
131	September 17	@ Lions	3–0	**M. Tanaka** (9–10)	Matsumoto (6–6)	**Y. Matsui** (31)	Belluna Dome	24,167	65–63–3	W1
132	September 18	@ Lions	4–3	**Norimoto** (9–8)	Yoza (10–7)	**Y. Matsui** (32)	Belluna Dome	27,471	66–63–3	W2
133	September 19	@ Lions	6–4 (11)	**Busenitz** (3–1)	Masuda (2–5)	**Miyamori** (1)	Belluna Dome	27,475	67–63–3	W3
134	September 20	@ Lions	1–4	K. Takahashi (11–8)	**Takinaka** (2–9)	Taira (8)	Belluna Dome	14,063	67–64–3	L1
135	September 23	Fighters	3–6 (10)	Rodriguez (3–2)	**Miyamori** (1–1)	—	Rakuten Seimei Park	23,319	67–65–3	L2
136	September 24	Buffaloes	1–9	Yamamoto (15–5)	**M. Tanaka** (9–11)	—	Rakuten Seimei Park	21,332	67–66–3	L3
137	September 25	@ Fighters	6–0	**Karashima** (6–4)	Matsuura (0–1)	—	Sapporo Dome	22,619	68–66–3	W1
138	September 26	@ Fighters	2–3	Kato (8–7)	**Hayakawa** (5–9)	Itoh (1)	Sapporo Dome	16,923	68–67–3	L1
139	September 27	@ Buffaloes	6–1	**Norimoto** (10–8)	Miyagi (11–8)	—	Kyocera Dome	20,092	69–67–3	W1
140	September 28	Lions	0–1	Imai (5–1)	**Kishi** (8–10)	Taira (9)	Rakuten Seimei Park	17,313	69–68–3	L1
141	September 29	Hawks	4–5	Ohzeki (7–6)	**Anraku** (6–2)	Moinelo (24)	Rakuten Seimei Park	14,360	69–69–3	L2
142	September 30	Hawks	1–5	Wada (7–4)	**Wakui** (4–3)	—	Rakuten Seimei Park	18,642	69–70–3	L3
143	October 2	Buffaloes	2–5	Udagawa (2–1)	**M. Tanaka** (9–12)	Abe (3)	Rakuten Seimei Park	25,339	69–71–3	L4

Win | Loss | Tie | Postponement | = Interleague play
**Bold** = Eagles team member

== Roster ==
2022 Tohoku Rakuten Golden Eagles
Roster
Pitchers: 1 Yuki Matsui; 11 Takayuki Kishi; 13 Kohei Morihara; 14 Takahiro Norimoto; 16 Hideaki Wakui; 18 Masahiro Tanaka; 20 Tomohiro Anraku; 21 Takahisa Hayakawa; 23 Hayato Yuge; 28 Tomohito Sakai; 29 Koichi Takada; 30 Shinri Komine; 31 Yuya Fukui; 32 Alan Busenitz; 40 Takuma Uchima; 41 Yoshinao Kamata; 43 Sung Chia-hao; 45 Tomotaka Matsui; 46 Shoma Fujihira; 47 Masaru Fujii; 49 Masaya Nishigaki; 52 Taisei Tsurusaki; 53 Hosei Takata; 56 Sora Suzuki; 57 Ryota Takinaka; 58 Wataru Karashima; 60 Ryota Ishibashi; 62 Naoto Nishiguchi; 64 Hiroyuki Fukuyama; 71 Kazuki Yoshikawa; 72 Satoshi Miyamori; 79 Yuki Watanabe	Catchers: 2 Hikaru Ohta; 26 Ginjiro Sumitani; 44 Takaya Tanaka; 55 Yuma Yasuda; 65 Kengo Horiuchi; 70 Tsuyoshi Ishihara; Infielders: 0 Hiroto Kobukata; 3 Hideto Asamura; 5 Eigoro Mogi; 7 Daichi Suzuki; 22 Keizo Kawashima; 24 Fumiya Kurokawa; 33 Ginji Akaminai; 34 Tsuyoshi Yamasaki; 39 Yukiya Itoh; 42 Chris Gittens; 48 Yoshiaki Watanabe; 66 Itsuki Murabayashi; 67 Yasuhito Uchida	Outfielders: 4 Louis Okoye; 6 Haruki Nishikawa; 8 Ryosuke Tatsumi; 12 José Marmolejos; 25 Kazuki Tanaka; 27 Takero Okajima; 35 Hiroaki Shimauchi; 38 Masaki Iwami; 50 Atsuki Mutoh; 51 Yuya Ogo; 54 Ren Wada	Manager: 99 Kazuhisa Ishii; Coaches: 89 Yasunaga Makishi (head); 73 Yoshiie Tachibana (hitting); 74 Naoto Watanabe (hitting); 80 Takashi Ishii (pitching); 75 Shinichiro Koyama (pitching); 90 Hidekazu Mitsuyama (battery/defense strategy); 95 Hiroshi Narahara (infield defense/baserunning); 87 Manabu Satake (outfield defense/baserunning)

== Player statistics ==
=== Batting ===
2022 Tohoku Rakuten Golden Eagles batting statistics
Player	G	AB	R	H	2B	3B	HR	RBI	SB	BB	K	AVG	OBP	SLG	TB
Ginji Akaminai	83	238	18	62	6	0	0	26	0	28	31	.261	.335	.286	68
Hideto Asamura	143	532	73	134	17	0	27	86	4	92	137	.252	.365	.436	232
Chris Gittens	21	62	4	15	2	0	0	8	0	11	25	.242	.365	.274	17
Takahisa Hayakawa	19	1	0	0	0	0	0	0	0	1	1	.000	.500	.000	0
Kengo Horiuchi	5	1	0	0	0	0	0	0	0	0	0	.000	.000	.000	0
Tsuyoshi Ishihara	1	1	0	0	0	0	0	0	0	0	0	.000	.000	.000	0
Yukiya Itoh^{†}	3	8	0	0	0	0	0	0	0	0	4	.000	.000	.000	0
Masaki Iwami	3	7	1	2	1	0	0	0	0	0	3	.286	.286	.429	3
Wataru Karashima	17	4	0	0	0	0	0	0	0	0	2	.000	.000	.000	0
Keizo Kawashima	12	22	1	3	1	0	1	6	0	1	9	.136	.174	.318	7
Takayuki Kishi	22	2	0	0	0	0	0	0	0	0	1	.000	.000	.000	0
Hiroto Kobukata	118	424	54	113	16	5	2	29	21	37	65	.267	.328	.342	145
Fumiya Kurokawa	17	63	4	14	3	0	0	2	0	7	9	.222	.296	.270	17
José Marmolejos	58	202	14	42	6	0	7	28	0	20	68	.208	.278	.342	69
Eigoro Mogi	73	238	26	53	12	1	9	30	4	27	74	.223	.300	.395	94
Itsuki Murabayashi	47	16	9	3	0	0	0	0	0	1	5	.188	.235	.188	3
Atsuki Mutoh	43	88	11	22	2	3	1	9	1	8	28	.250	.323	.375	33
Haruki Nishikawa	108	372	58	81	17	4	7	37	19	68	103	.218	.342	.341	127
Takahiro Norimoto	21	2	0	0	0	0	0	0	0	0	2	.000	.000	.000	0
Yuya Ogo	10	18	2	3	1	0	1	2	0	2	4	.167	.250	.389	7
Hikaru Ohta	71	145	10	31	4	0	3	18	1	21	46	.214	.325	.303	44
Takero Okajima	53	182	20	39	8	3	3	25	2	10	27	.214	.264	.341	62
Louis Okoye	6	25	2	5	0	0	0	0	1	0	8	.200	.200	.200	5
Hiroaki Shimauchi	142	541	59	161	36	3	14	77	5	63	82	.298	.373	.453	245
Ginjiro Sumitani	98	253	21	60	4	0	4	18	0	18	52	.237	.293	.300	76
Daichi Suzuki	125	408	39	105	19	0	5	35	4	38	52	.257	.344	.341	139
Ryota Takinaka	15	1	0	0	0	0	0	0	0	0	1	.000	.000	.000	0
Kazuki Tanaka	77	63	10	9	3	0	1	5	6	6	25	.143	.229	.238	15
Masahiro Tanaka	25	4	0	0	0	0	0	0	0	0	1	.000	.000	.000	0
Takaya Tanaka	18	17	2	2	0	0	0	1	0	1	7	.118	.211	.118	2
Ryosuke Tatsumi	120	409	60	111	14	3	11	35	12	42	103	.271	.354	.401	164
Yasuhito Uchida	8	10	0	1	0	0	0	2	0	2	4	.100	.231	.100	1
Ren Wada	11	29	0	2	0	0	0	1	0	0	10	.069	.067	.069	2
Yoshiaki Watanabe	60	153	14	37	1	2	1	17	2	12	24	.242	.295	.294	45
Tsuyoshi Yamasaki	79	187	19	38	6	5	3	13	15	17	46	.203	.280	.337	63
Yuma Yasuda	5	10	2	2	0	0	1	1	0	2	4	.200	.333	.500	5
Total：36 players	143	4738	533	1,150	179	29	101	511	97	535	1,063	.243	.325	.357	1,690

^{†}Denotes player joined the team mid-season. Stats reflect time with the Eagles only.
^{‡}Denotes player left the team mid-season. Stats reflect time with the Eagles only.
Bold/italics denotes best in the league

=== Pitching ===
2022 Tohoku Rakuten Golden Eagles pitching statistics
Player	W	L	ERA	G	GS	SV	IP	H	R	ER	BB	K
Tomohiro Anraku	6	2	4.38	52	0	1	49.1	51	25	24	12	39
Alan Busenitz	3	1	2.27	34	0	0	31.2	22	8	8	10	25
Shoma Fujihira	1	0	3.97	8	5	0	22.2	15	11	10	12	17
Masaru Fujii	1	2	3.38	4	4	0	18.2	16	8	7	10	10
Yuya Fukui	0	0	4.09	11	0	0	11	14	5	5	4	7
Hiroyuki Fukuyama	0	0	0.00	3	0	0	3	3	0	0	0	3
Takahisa Hayakawa	5	9	3.86	19	19	0	107.1	105	48	46	23	86
Ryota Ishibashi	2	0	6.12	26	0	0	32.1	35	22	22	12	18
Yoshinao Kamata	0	0	6.00	2	2	0	6	10	4	4	3	2
Wataru Karashima	6	4	3.40	17	17	0	90	86	36	34	24	53
Takayuki Kishi	8	10	3.19	22	22	0	141	116	51	50	28	118
Shinri Komine	0	0	6.00	6	0	0	6	9	4	4	5	4
Tomotaka Matsui	0	0	9.00	1	1	0	4	6	4	4	2	3
Yuki Matsui	1	3	1.92	53	0	32	51.2	21	11	11	19	83
Satoshi Miyamori^{†}	1	1	1.54	26	0	1	23.1	12	4	4	12	23
Kohei Morihara^{‡}	0	0	0.00	3	0	0	2.1	3	0	0	1	3
Masaya Nishigaki	0	0	2.66	24	0	0	23.2	20	7	7	10	15
Naoto Nishiguchi	4	0	2.26	61	0	0	55.2	39	16	14	26	59
Takahiro Norimoto	10	8	3.53	21	21	0	125	127	54	49	38	104
Tomohito Sakai	1	1	3.31	34	0	0	32.2	23	12	12	17	32
Sung Chia-hao	4	2	2.61	54	0	0	51.2	45	18	15	15	38
Sora Suzuki	1	3	4.03	38	0	0	38	25	17	17	25	35
Koichi Takada	0	0	7.11	2	1	0	6.1	8	5	5	4	9
Hosei Takata	0	0	7.20	3	0	0	5	5	5	4	5	5
Ryota Takinaka	2	9	4.62	15	15	0	78	94	44	40	27	42
Masahiro Tanaka	9	12	3.31	25	25	0	163	160	65	60	30	126
Taisei Tsurusaki	0	0	4.50	11	0	0	12	16	6	6	6	7
Takuma Uchima	0	0	0.00	1	0	0	1	1	0	0	0	0
Hideaki Wakui	4	3	3.54	10	10	0	56	50	23	22	10	35
Yuki Watanabe	0	0	2.13	13	0	0	12.2	7	3	3	4	10
Kazuki Yoshikawa	0	0	1.80	4	0	0	5	3	1	1	1	2
Hayato Yuge	0	1	3.29	13	1	1	13.2	14	5	5	6	5
Total：32 players	69	71	3.47	143	143	35	1,279.2	1,161	522	493	401	1,018

^{†}Denotes player joined the team mid-season. Stats reflect time with the Eagles only.
^{‡}Denotes player left the team mid-season. Stats reflect time with the Eagles only.
Bold/italics denotes best in the league

== Awards and honors ==
Taiju Life Monthly MVP Award

- Haruki Nishikawa - March/April (batter)
- Hiroaki Shimauchi - August (batter)

Best Nine Award

- Hideto Asamura - second baseman
- Hiroaki Shimauchi - outfielder

Mitsui Golden Glove Award

- Ryosuke Tatsumi - outfielder

All-Star Series selections

- Kazuhisa Ishii - coach
- Hideto Asamura - second baseman
- Takayuki Kishi - pitcher
- Hiroto Kobukata - infielder
- Yuki Matsui - pitcher
- Takahiro Norimoto - pitcher
- Hiroaki Shimauchi - outfielder

SKY PerfecTV! Sayonara Award

- Hideto Asamura - March/April (April 30)
- Hiroaki Shimauchi - June (June 22)

== Farm team ==
2022 Eastern League regular season standings
Pos	Team	G	W	L	T	Pct.	GB	Home	Road
1	Tohoku Rakuten Golden Eagles	114	69	42	3	.622	—	38–20–2	31–22–1
2	Chiba Lotte Marines	109	61	45	3	.575	5½	34–18–2	27–27–1
3	Yomiuri Giants	125	63	52	10	.548	8	35–26–5	28–26–5
4	Tokyo Yakult Swallows	111	54	56	1	.491	14½	29–22–1	25–34
5	Saitama Seibu Lions	111	47	58	6	.448	19	23–25–3	24–33–3
6	Hokkaido Nippon-Ham Fighters	99	38	55	6	.409	22	18–33–3	20–22–3
7	Yokohama DeNA BayStars	105	40	62	3	.392	24½	26–27	14–35–3

^{†} League champion

== Nippon Professional Baseball draft ==
2022 Tohoku Rakuten Golden Eagles draft selections
Round	Name	Position	Affiliation	Signed?
1	Kosei Shoji	Pitcher	Rikkyo University	Yes
2	Ryuji Komago	Pitcher	Saginomiya Seisakusho	Yes
3	Shota Watanabe	Pitcher	Kyushu Sangyo University	Yes
4	Mao Itoh	Pitcher	Tokyo University of Agriculture Okhotsk	Yes
5	Ryuya Taira	Infielder	NTT West	Yes
6	Yuki Hayashi	Pitcher	Seino Transportation	Yes
Development players
1	Konosuke Tatsumi	Infielder	Seinan Gakuin University	Yes
2	Kosei Koga	Pitcher	Shimonoseki International High School	Yes
3	Akihiro Takeshita	Pitcher	Hakodate University	Yes
4	Sotaro Nagata	Infielder	National Taiwan University of Sport	Yes
