= Manabu Satake =

Japanese baseball player (born 1974)

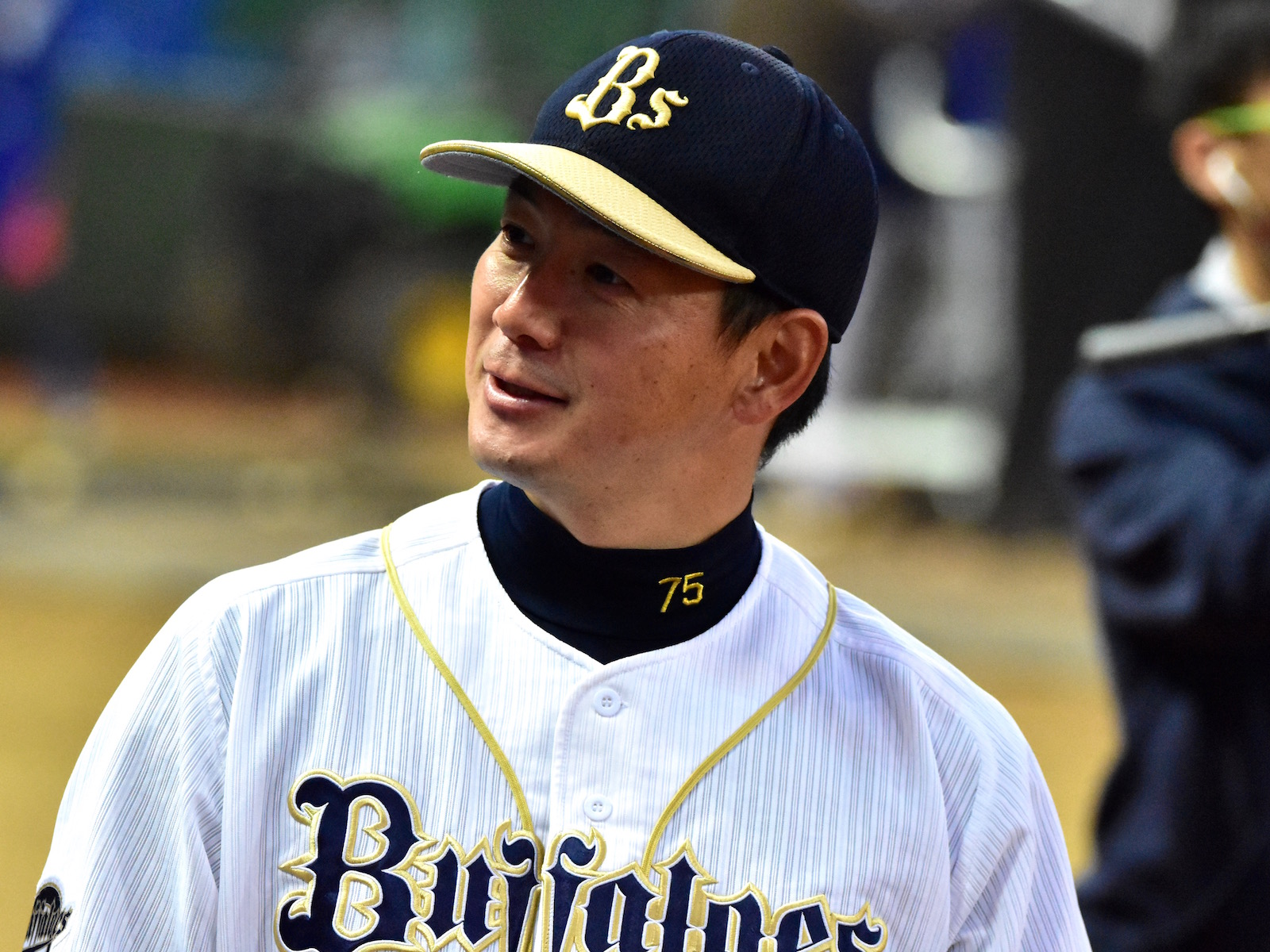
- Infielder / Outfielder / Coach
- Born: October 27, 1974 (age 51); Sapporo, Hokkaido
- Batted: Right Threw: Right

NPB debut
- May 25, 1997, for the Orix BlueWave

Last NPB appearance
- August 2, 2006, for the Tohoku Rakuten Golden Eagles

NPB statistics
- Batting average: .242
- Hits: 251
- RBIs: 78
- Stats at Baseball Reference

Teams
- As player: Orix BlueWave (1997–2004); Tohoku Rakuten Golden Eagles (2005–2006); As coach: Tohoku Rakuten Golden Eagles (2007–2009, 2022–2023); Orix Buffaloes (2011–2021)
- Last updated on: 3 January 2022

Manabu Satake (佐竹 学, Satake Manabu; born October 27, 1974) is a former Japanese professional baseball player. He was the number 4 draft pick for the Orix BlueWave in 1997.
