= Shunsuke Sato (baseball) =

Japanese baseball player (born 2000)

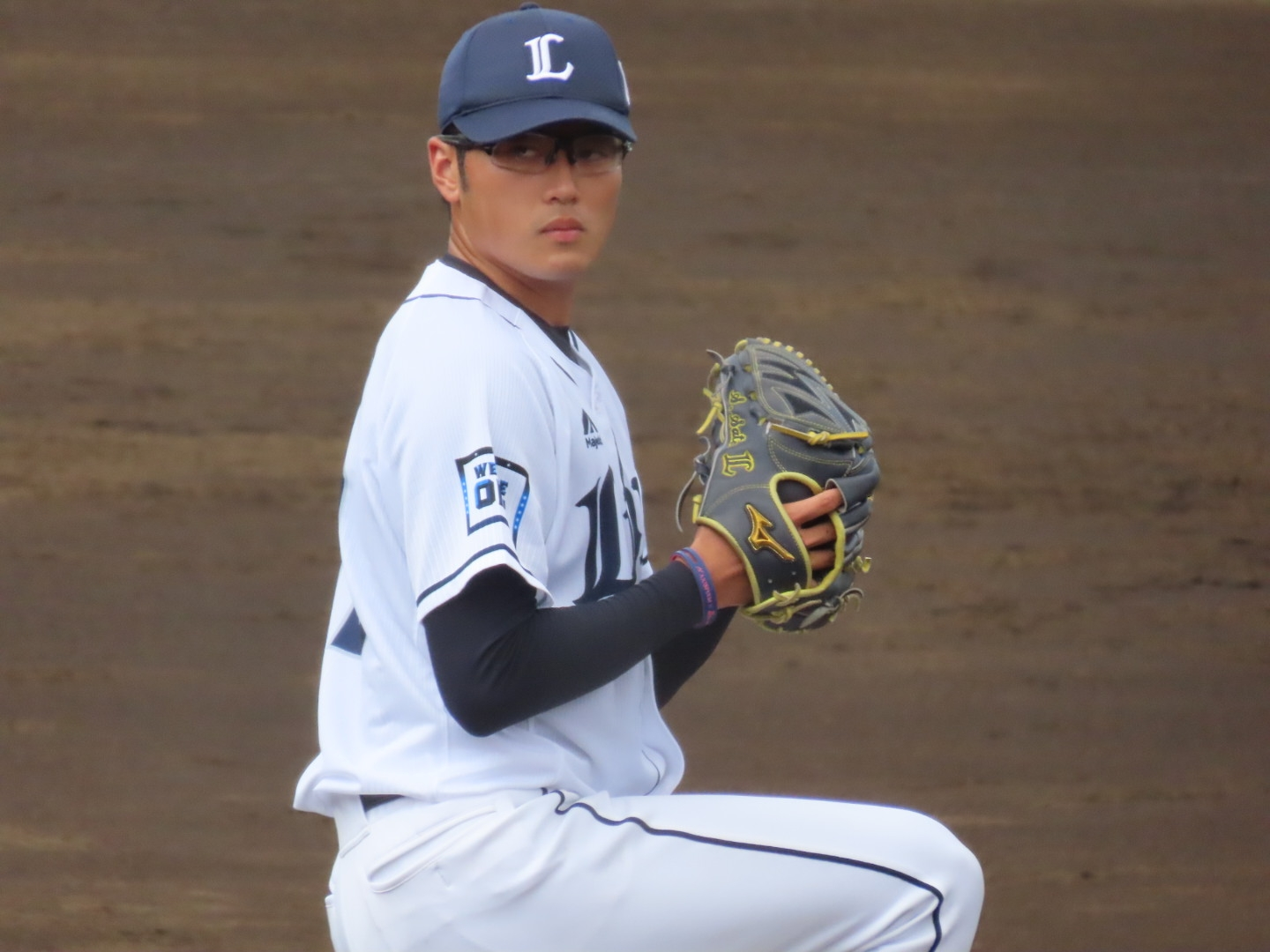

Saitama Seibu Lions – No. 19
- Pitcher
- Born: January 3, 2000 (age 26); Sendai, Miyagi, Japan
- Bats: Left Throws: Left

NPB debut
- March 29, 2022, for the Saitama Seibu Lions

Career statistics (through 2023 season)
- Win–loss record: 1–2
- Earned run average: 3.63
- Strikeouts: 60
- Saves: 0
- Holds: 18
- Stats at Baseball Reference

Teams
- Saitama Seibu Lions (2022–present)

Shunsuke Sato (佐藤 隼輔, Sato Shunsuke; born January 3, 2000, in Sendai, Miyagi, Japan) is a professional Japanese baseball player. He is a pitcher for the Saitama Seibu Lions of Nippon Professional Baseball (NPB).
