= Hiroki Tokoda =

Japanese baseball player (born 1995)

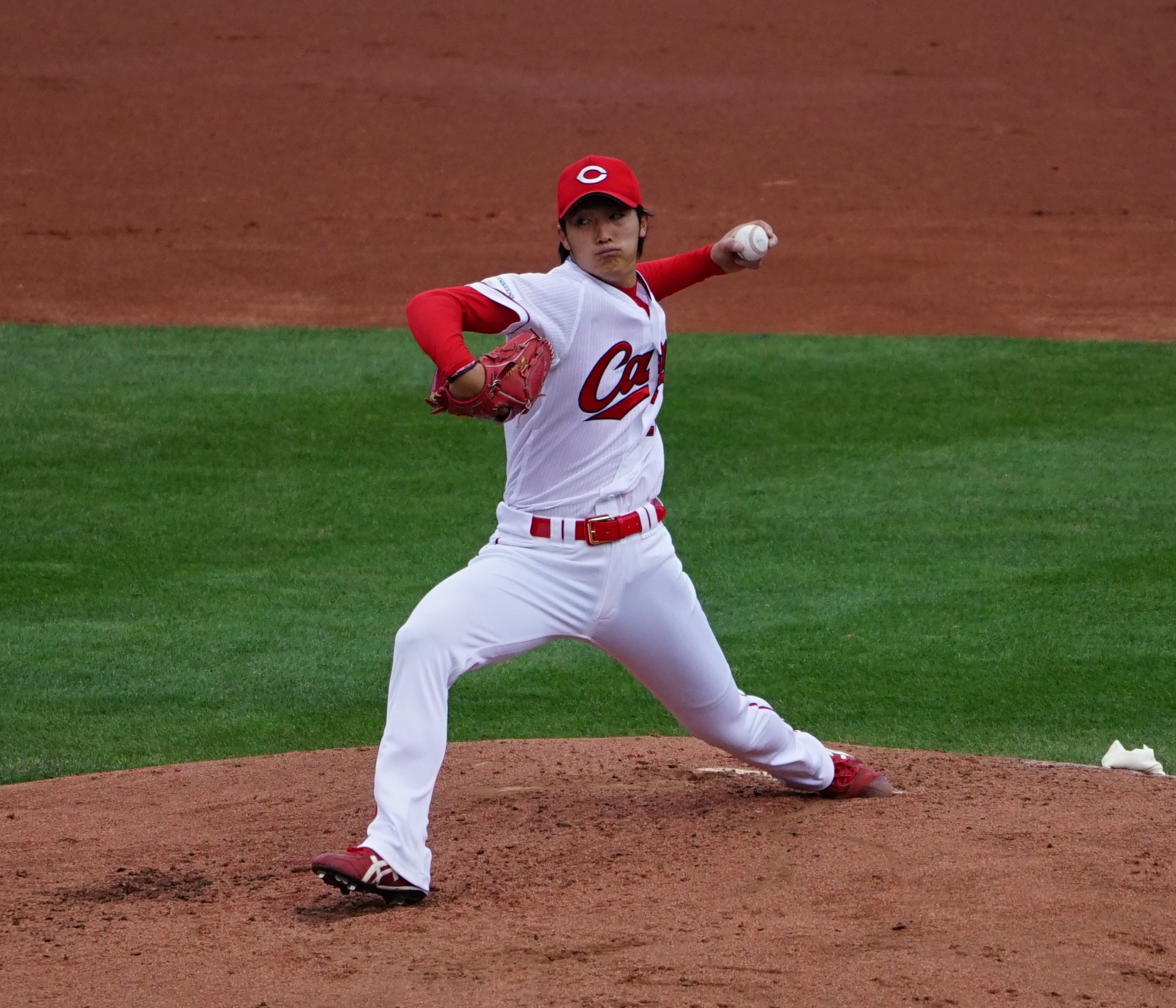

Hiroshima Toyo Carp – No. 19
- Pitcher
- Born: March 1, 1995 (age 31); Amagasaki, Hyōgo, Japan
- Bats: Left Throws: Left

NPB debut
- April 5, 2017, for the Hiroshima Toyo Carp

Career statistics (through 2025 season)
- Win–loss record: 57-53
- Earned Run Average: 2.99
- Strikeouts: 610
- Stats at Baseball Reference

Teams
- Hiroshima Toyo Carp (2017–present)

Career highlights and awards
- 3× NPB All-Star (2019, 2022, 2024)

Hiroki Tokoda (床田 寛樹, Tokoda Hiroki; born March 1, 1995) is a Japanese professional baseball pitcher for the Hiroshima Toyo Carp of Nippon Professional Baseball (NPB).

== Career ==
On May 3, 2025, Tokoda tossed a complete game shutout against the Chunichi Dragons, but did not record a strikeout, becoming the fifth pitcher in Carp history to do so.
