= Katsunori Hirai =

Japanese baseball player (born 1991)

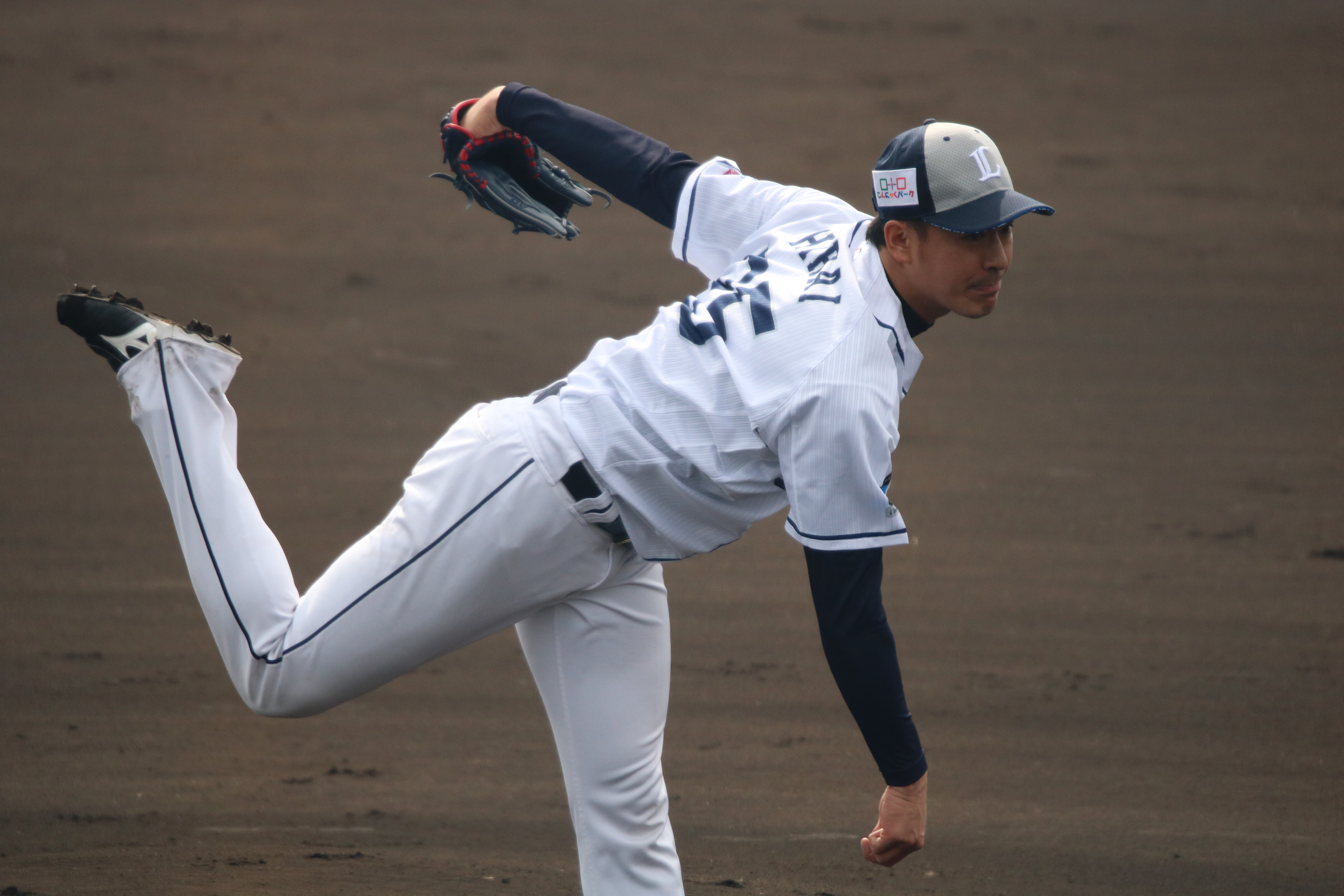
- Hirai with the Saitama Seibu Lions

Free agent
- Pitcher
- Born: December 20, 1991 (age 34); Ichinomiya, Aichi, Japan
- Bats: Right Throws: Right

NPB debut
- May 27, 2017, for the Saitama Seibu Lions

NPB statistics (through 2025 season)
- Win–loss: 29–25
- ERA: 3.39
- Strikeouts: 353
- Stats at Baseball Reference

Teams
- Saitama Seibu Lions (2017–2025)

Career highlights and awards
- NPB All-Star (2019)

Katsunori Hirai (平井 克典, Hirai Katsunori; born December 20, 1991) is a Japanese professional baseball pitcher who is a free agent. He has previously played in Nippon Professional Baseball (NPB) for the Saitama Seibu Lions.

== Career ==
=== Saitama Seibu Lions ===
Hirai was selected in the 5th round in the 2016 Nippon Professional Baseball draft by the Saitama Seibu Lions. In the 2019 NPB season, Hirai appeared in 81 games, breaking the Pacific League Record for most games pitched, previously held by Kazuhisa Inao.

In 350 total appearances for the Lions across parts of eight seasons, Hirai compiled a 29-25 record and 3.39 ERA with 353 strikeouts over 459 innings of work.

=== Algodoneros de Unión Laguna ===
On January 4, 2026, Hirai signed with the Algodoneros de Unión Laguna of the Mexican League. He made three appearances for Unión Laguna, but struggled to a 27.00 ERA with one strikeout across 2 1/3 innings pitched. Hirai was released by the Algodoneros on April 26.
