= Tomohiro Anraku =

Japanese baseball player (born 1996)

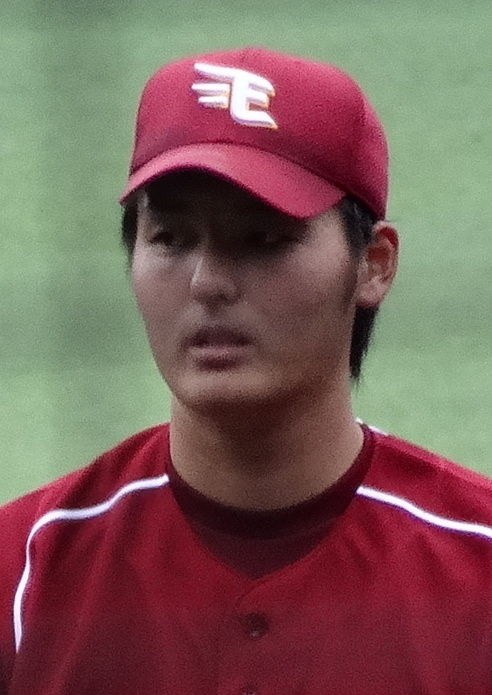
- Anraku with the Tohoku Rakuten Golden Eagles

Diablos Rojos del México – No. 20
- Pitcher
- Born: November 4, 1996 (age 29); Matsuyama, Shikoku, Japan
- Bats: Right Throws: Right

NPB debut
- October 5, 2015, for the Tohoku Rakuten Golden Eagles

NPB statistics (through 2023 season)
- Win–loss record: 18–21
- Earned run average: 3.59
- Strikeouts: 277
- Stats at Baseball Reference

Teams
- Tohoku Rakuten Golden Eagles (2015–2023)
Medals
Men's baseball
Representing Japan
U-23 Baseball World Cup
Gold medal – first place	2016 Monterrey	Team
U-18 Baseball World Cup
Silver medal – second place	2013 Taichung	Team

Tomohiro Anraku (安樂 智大, Anrakū Tōmohiro, born November 4, 1996) is a Japanese professional baseball pitcher for the Diablos Rojos del México of the Mexican League. He has previously played in Nippon Professional Baseball (NPB) for the Tohoku Rakuten Golden Eagles.

== Career ==
=== Amateur ===
Anraku attended Saibi High School in Ehime Prefecture, Japan. As a high school pitcher in 2013, Anraku had a fastball that was measured as high as 157 km/h (98 mph).

During the 2013 Spring Kōshien high school tournament, Anraku threw 772 pitches over five games in nine days, including 232 in one game.

=== Tohoku Rakuten Golden Eagles ===
The Tohoku Rakuten Golden Eagles selected Anraku in the 2014 Nippon Professional Baseball draft. Anraku pitched parts of nine seasons with the Eagles, registering an overall 18–21 win–loss record and 3.59 earned run average with 277 strikeouts across 231 appearances.

On December 1, 2023, the Eagles released Anraku after numerous teammates testified to the team regarding his harassment and physical abuse of younger players.

=== Diablos Rojos del México ===
On March 19, 2024, Anraku signed with the Diablos Rojos del México of the Mexican League. He made 47 appearances for México, compiling a 3.50 ERA with 39 strikeouts and 4 saves across 46 1/3 innings pitched. In addition, Anraku's 20 holds were a league–leading mark. With the team, he won the Serie del Rey.

On March 25, 2025, Anraku re-signed with the Diablos. Anraku make 47 relief appearances for México, compiling a 1–2 record with a 2.98 ERA and 22 saves across 45 1/3 innings pitched. He was named the Mexican League Reliever of the Year following the season. With the team, Anraku won his second consecutive Serie del Rey.
