= Yuki Tsumori =

Japanese baseball player (born 1998)

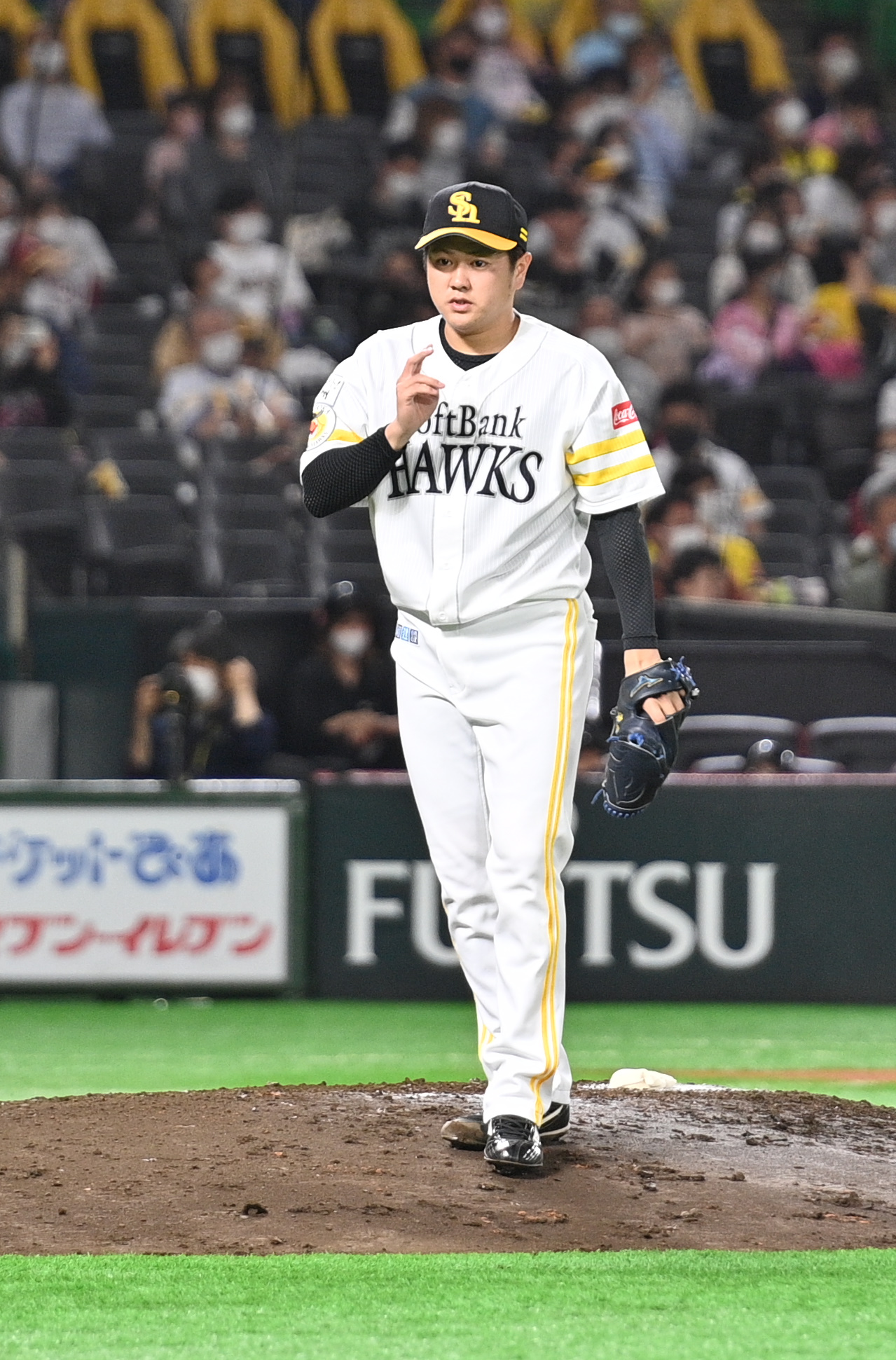
- Tsumori with the Fukuoka SoftBank Hawks

Fukuoka SoftBank Hawks – No. 11
- Pitcher
- Born: January 21, 1998 (age 28); Wakayama, Wakayama, Japan
- Bats: Right Throws: Right

NPB debut
- June 21, 2020, for the Fukuoka SoftBank Hawks

NPB statistics (through 2024 season)
- Win–loss record: 15-12
- ERA: 2.75
- Strikeouts: 193
- Stats at Baseball Reference

Teams
- Fukuoka SoftBank Hawks (2020–present)

Career highlights and awards
- 2× Japan Series champion (2020, 2025); 2× NPB All-Star (2021, 2023)
Medals
Men's baseball
Representing Japan
Haarlem Baseball Week
Gold medal – first place	2018 Haarlem, Netherlands	Team

Yuki Tsumori (津森 宥紀, Tsumori Yūki; born January 21, 1998) is a Japanese professional baseball pitcher for the Fukuoka SoftBank Hawks of Nippon Professional Baseball (NPB).

== Early baseball career ==
Tsumori went on to Tohoku Fukushi University, and he pitched as a relief pitcher in the 67th Japan National Collegiate Baseball Championship and won the Most valuable player Award.

== Professional career ==
On October 17, 2019, Tsumori was drafted by the Fukuoka SoftBank Hawks in the 2019 Nippon Professional Baseball draft.

On June 21, 2020, Tsumori debuted in the Pacific League against the Chiba Lotte Marines as a relief pitcher in a bases-loaded, no-out situation and was hit by a Grand slam. In the match against the Saitama Seibu Lions on June 24, he pitched as a relief pitcher and became his first Winning pitcher. In 2020 season, he recorded with a 14 Games pitched, a 1–0 Win–loss record, a 2.76 ERA, a 3 Holds, a 17 strikeouts in 16.1 innings. In the 2020 Japan Series against the Yomiuri Giants, he was selected as the Japan Series roster.

On July 17, 2021, Tsumori participated the All-Star Game for the first time in My Navi All-Star Game 2021. In 2021 season, he recorded with a 45 Games pitched, a 1–0 Win–loss record, a 2.18 ERA, a 11 Holds, and a 43 strikeouts in 33 innings.

In 2022 season, he finished the regular season with a 51 Games pitched, a 4–6 Win–loss record, a 2.91 ERA, a 18 Holds, one saves, and a 51 strikeouts in 46.1 innings.

On July 19, 2023, Tsumori participated the All-Star Game for the second time in Mynavi All-Star Game 2023. In 2023 season, he finished the regular season as setup man with a 56 Games pitched, a 4–4 win–loss record, a 2.91 ERA, a 22 holds, and a 44 strikeouts in 48.2 innings.

== International career ==
Tsumori was elected to the Japan national baseball team at the 2018 Haarlem Baseball Week, and was elected to the Japan national baseball team at the 2017 USA VS Japan Collegiate All-Star Series and the 2018 USA VS Japan Collegiate All-Star Series.
