= Wataru Karashima =

Japanese baseball player (born 1990)

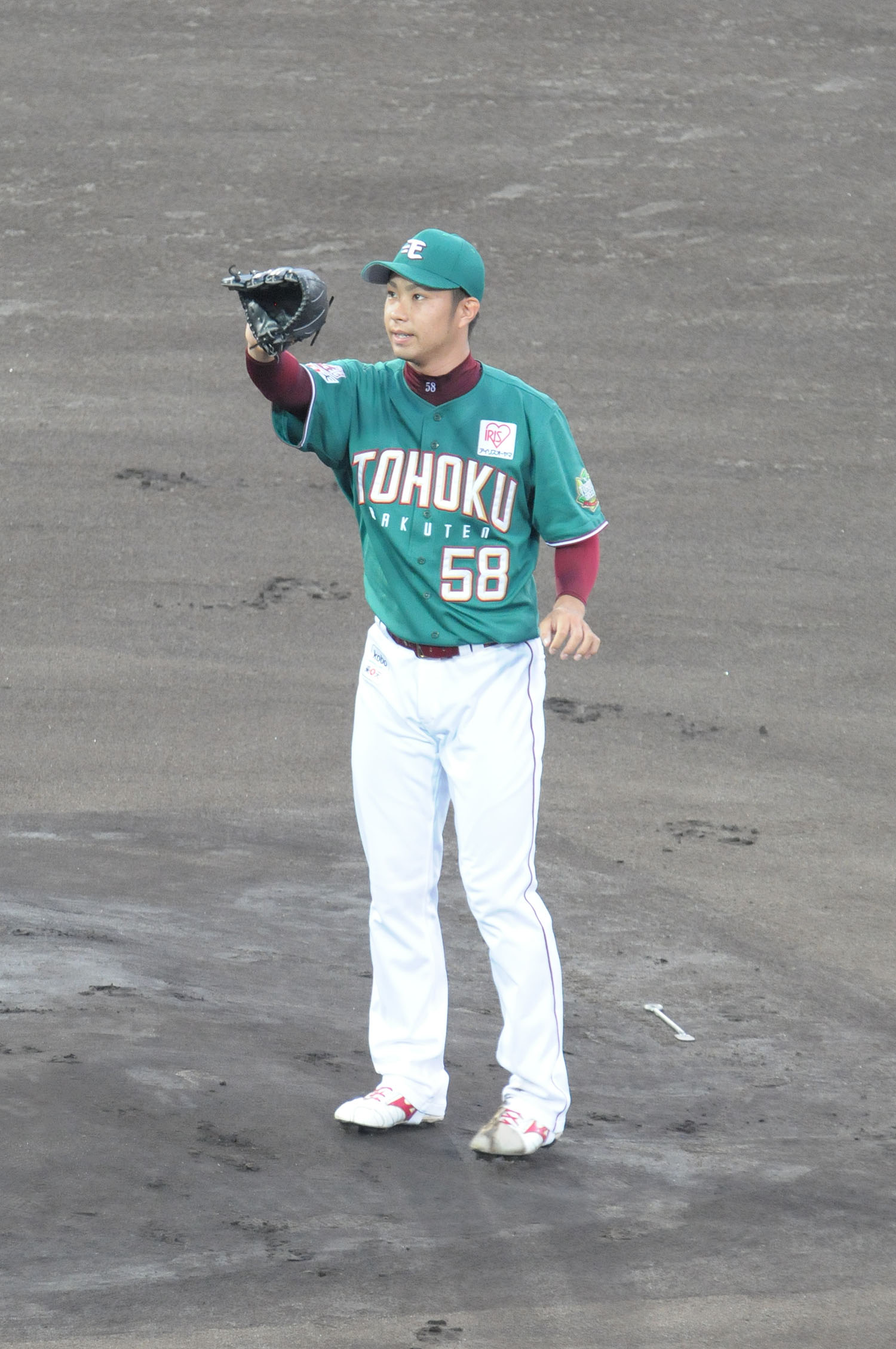
- Karashima with the Tohoku Rakuten Golden Eagles

Tohoku Rakuten Golden Eagles – No. 58
- Pitcher
- Born: October 18, 1990 (age 35)
- Bats: Left Throws: Left

NPB debut
- August 13, 2009, for the Tohoku Rakuten Golden Eagles

Career statistics (through 2023 season)
- Win–loss: 56-72
- ERA: 3.97
- Strikeouts: 700
- Saves: 2
- Holds: 10

Teams
- Tohoku Rakuten Golden Eagles (2009–present)

Career highlights and awards
- 1x Japan Series champion (2013)

Wataru Karashima (辛島 航, born October 18, 1990, in Fukuoka, Fukuoka) is a Japanese professional baseball pitcher for the Tohoku Rakuten Golden Eagles in Japan's Nippon Professional Baseball.
