= Ginjiro Sumitani =

Japanese baseball player (born 1987)

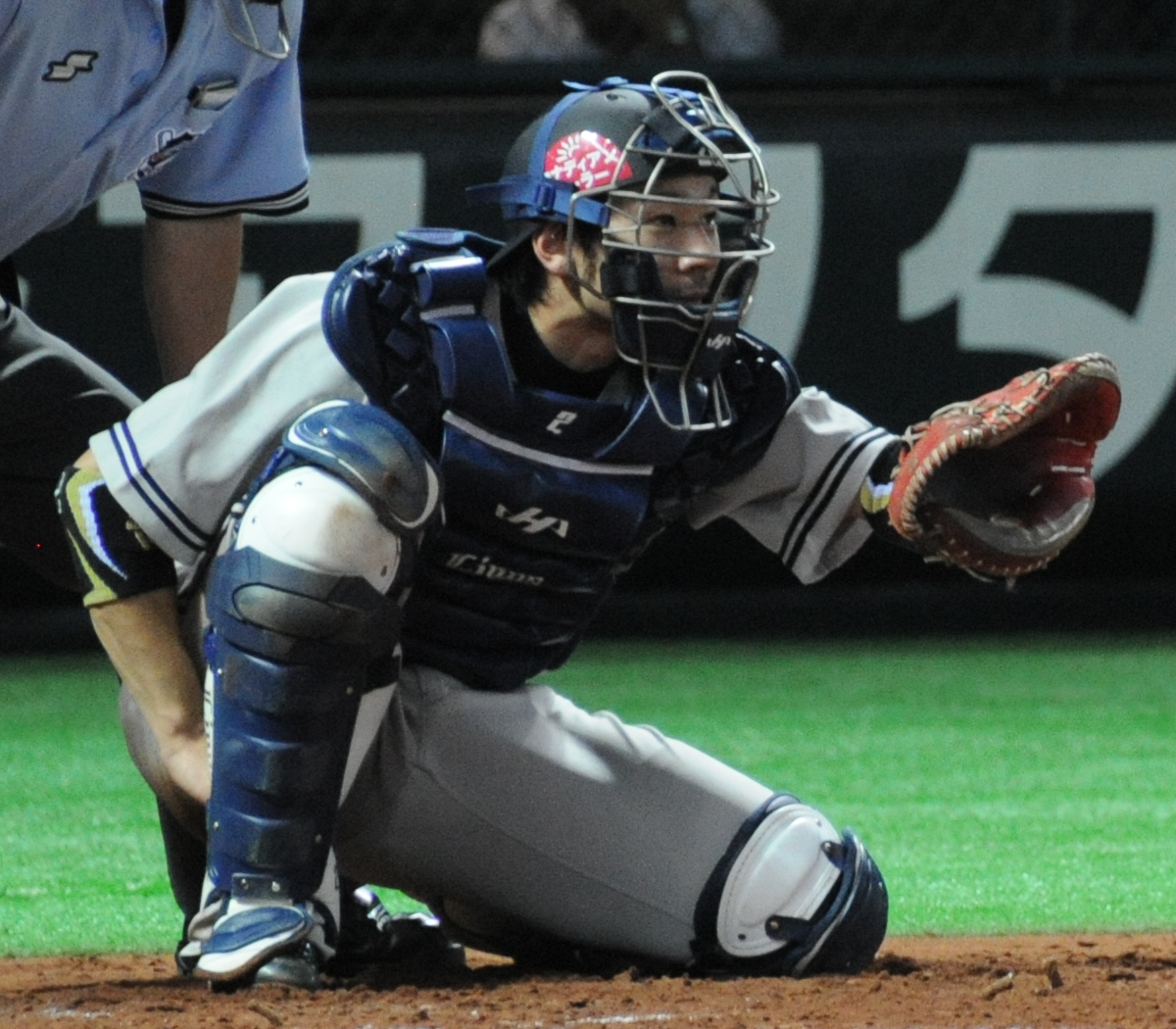
- Sumitani with the Saitama Seibu Lions

Saitama Seibu Lions – No. 27
- Catcher
- Born: July 19, 1987 (age 38); Kyoto, Japan
- Bats: Right Throws: Right

NPB debut
- March 25, 2006, for the Seibu Lions

NPB statistics (through 2024 season)
- Batting average: .214
- Hits: 841
- Home Runs: 47
- RBI: 353
- Stolen bases: 8
- Stats at Baseball Reference

Teams
- Seibu Lions/Saitama Seibu Lions (2006–2018); Yomiuri Giants (2019–2021); Tohoku Rakuten Golden Eagles (2021–2023); Saitama Seibu Lions (2024–present)

Career highlights and awards
- Pacific League Best Nine Award (2015); 2× Pacific League Golden Glove Award (2012, 2015); 3× NPB All-Star (2011, 2015, 2016); Japan Series champion (2008)
Medals
Men's baseball
Representing Japan
2015 WBSC Premier12
Bronze medal – third place	2015 Tokyo	Team

Ginjiro Sumitani (炭谷 銀仁朗, Sumitani Ginjiro; born July 19, 1987) is a Japanese professional baseball player for the Saitama Seibu Lions of Nippon Professional Baseball (NPB). He previously played in NPB for the Tohoku Rakuten Golden Eagles and Yomiuri Giants.

== Career ==
=== Seibu Lions/Saitama Seibu Lions ===
In the 2005 Nippon Professional Baseball draft, the Seibu Lions selected Sumitani with the first selection. On November 15, 2005, he signed with the Lions. On March 25, 2006, Sumitani made his NPB debut, and on March 29, he hit a grand slam off of D.J. Carrasco of the Fukuoka SoftBank Hawks, and became the fifth NPB player drafted out of high school to hit a grand slam in his first season. He also became the first rookie out of high school to homer twice in a game since Hideki Matsui did so 13 years previous. He finished his rookie season with a .181/.193/.290 slash line. In 2007, Sumitani played in 28 games for the Lions, logging a .174/.204/.304 sash line. For the 2008 season, Sumitani played in 46 contests with Seibu, batting .125/.149/.188. Sumitani also won the 2008 Japan Series with the Lions, beating the Yomiuri Giants in 7 games.

In 2009, Sumitani played in 112 games with Seibu, posting a .220/.260/.308 batting line with 3 home runs and 25 RBI. Sumitani only appeared in 5 total games in 2010, 4 for the farm team and 1 for the main club as he dealt with an injury. He had a resurgent season in 2011, posting a .218/.244/.265 slash line with 2 home runs and 22 RBI in 122 games, and earned his first career NPB All-Star selection. The following season, Sumitani played in 139 games for the Lions, slashing .194/.232/.233, and won the Pacific League Gold Glove Award after the season. For the 2013 season, Sumitani hit .215/.274/.291 with 5 home runs and 43 RBI in 141 games with the team. The next year, Sumitani slashed .202/.238/.297 with 7 home runs and 36 RBI in 125 games.

In 2015, Sumitani played in 133 games for Seibu, and hit .211/.247/.281 with 4 home runs and 35 RBI. For the season, he was named a two-time Gold Glove Award winner and a two-time NPB All-Star, and also took home the Pacific League Best Nine Award at catcher. In 2016, Sumitani was an All-Star for the third time in his career after he hit .218/.251/.269 with 1 home run and 22 RBI in 117 games. The following season, Sumitani played in 104 games for Seibu, posting a .251/.289/.348 slash line with 5 home runs and 30 RBI. In 2018, Sumitani played in 47 games for the team, logging a .248/.265/.310 batting line with no home runs and 9 RBI on the year. He became a free agent after the season.

=== Yomiuri Giants ===
On November 26, 2018, Sumitani signed contract with the Yomiuri Giants and was assigned the number 27. For the 2019 season, Sumitani played in 58 games with Yomiuri, slashing .262/.309/.437 with 6 home runs and 26 RBI. In the pandemic delayed 2020 season, Sumitani played in 56 games with Yomiuri, batting .180/.252/.230. Sumitani began the 2021 season with the Giants, posting a .188/.245/.250 slash line in 44 games.

=== Tohoku Rakuten Golden Eagles ===
On July 4, 2021, Sumitani was traded to the Tohoku Rakuten Golden Eagles in exchange for cash considerations.

=== Saitama Seibu Lions (Second stint) ===
On November 20, 2023, Sumitani signed contract with the old team Saitama Seibu Lions

== International career ==
He was selected Japan national baseball team at the 2013 World Baseball Classic, 2015 WBSC Premier12 and 2017 World Baseball Classic.
