= Yūta Kuroki =

Japanese baseball player (born 1994)

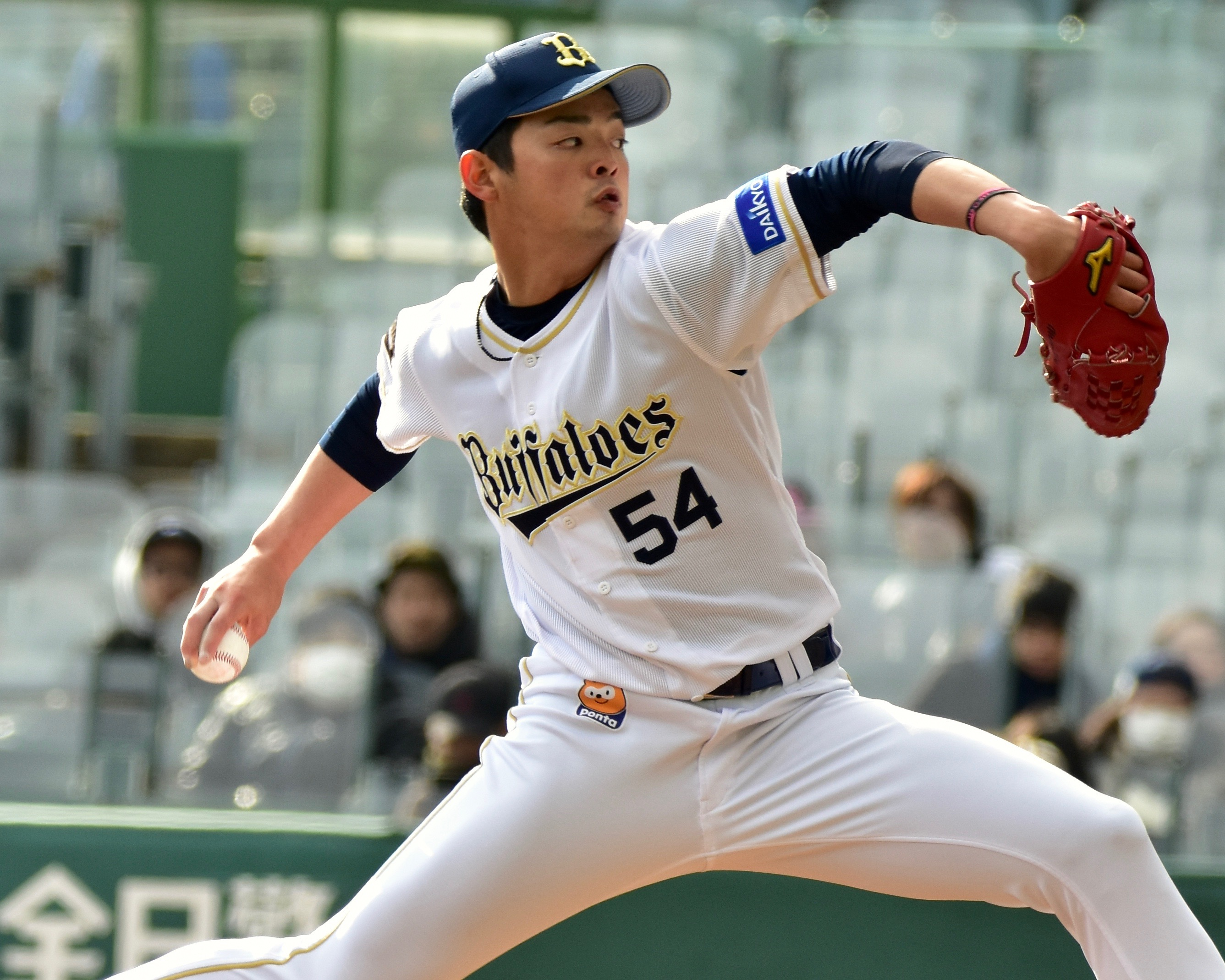

Saitama Seibu Lions – No. 54
- Pitcher
- Born: August 16, 1994 (age 31); Yokohama, Kanagawa, Japan
- Bats: Left Throws: Right

NPB debut
- March 31, 2017, for the Orix Buffaloes

NPB statistics (through 2024 season)
- Win–loss record: 10-11
- ERA: 4.37
- Strikeouts: 130
- Stats at Baseball Reference

Teams
- Orix Buffaloes (2017–2023); Hokkaido Nippon-Ham Fighters (2024)

Career highlights and awards
- Japan Series champion (2022)

Yūta Kuroki (黒木 優太, Kuroki Yūta; born August 16, 1994 in Yokohama, Kanagawa, Japan) is a Japanese professional baseball pitcher for the Saitama Seibu Lions of Nippon Professional Baseball (NPB). He has previously played in NPB for the Orix Buffaloes, with whom he won the Japan Series in 2022, and the Hokkaido Nippon-Ham Fighters.
