= Yuki Watanabe =

Japanese baseball player (born 1995)

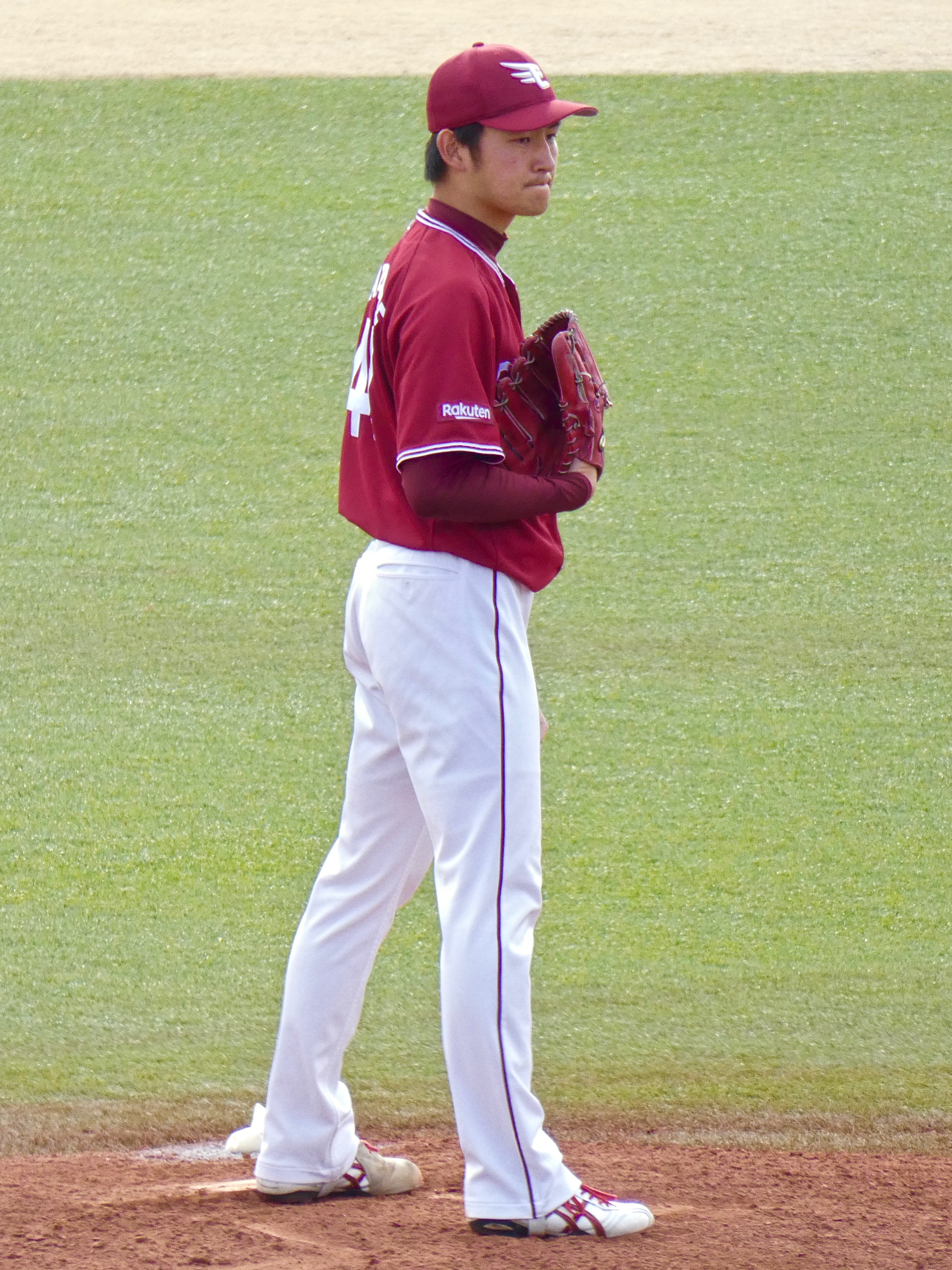
- Watanabe with the Tohoku Rakuten Golden Eagles
- Pitcher
- Born: November 8, 1995 (age 30); Fujiyoshida, Yamanashi, Japan
- Batted: Left Threw: Left

NPB debut
- July 25, 2019, for the Tohoku Rakuten Golden Eagles

Last NPB appearance
- July 18, 2022, for the Tohoku Rakuten Golden Eagles

NPB statistics (through 2022 season)
- Win–loss record: 0-0
- ERA: 2.89
- Holds: 3
- Strikeouts: 17

Teams
- Tohoku Rakuten Golden Eagles (2017–2022); Fukuoka SoftBank Hawks (2023–2024)

Yuki Watanabe (渡邊 佑樹, Watanabe Yūki; born November 8, 1995) is a Japanese professional baseball pitcher for the Fukuoka SoftBank Hawks of Nippon Professional Baseball (NPB).

He previously played for the Tohoku Rakuten Golden Eagles.

== Professional career ==
=== Tohoku Rakuten Golden Eagles ===
On October 26, 2017, Watanabe was drafted by the Tohoku Rakuten Golden Eagles in the 2017 Nippon Professional Baseball draft.

In 2018 season, he played in the Eastern League of NPB's second league.

On July 25, 2019, Watanabe pitched his debut game against the Saitama Seibu Lions as a relief pitcher. In 2019 season, he pitched in one game in the Pacific League.

In 2020 season, he never got a chance to pitch in the first league. On December 8, 2020, the Eagles re-signed him as a developmental player with an estimated salary of 5 million yen.

In 2021 season, Watanabe changed his pitching form to sidearm last offseason and it paid off. On March 1, 2021, the Eagles re-signed him as a registered player under control. He pitched in nine games with a 5.40 ERA and two holds.

In 2022 season, Watanabe had a 2.13 ERA and one hold in 13 appearances and 12.2 innings, but the Eagles announced on October 22, that he was a free agent.

=== Fukuoka SoftBank Hawks ===
On November 21, 2022, the Fukuoka Softbank Hawks announced that they had signed Watanabe as a developmental player.
