= Takayuki Katoh =

Japanese baseball player (born 1992)

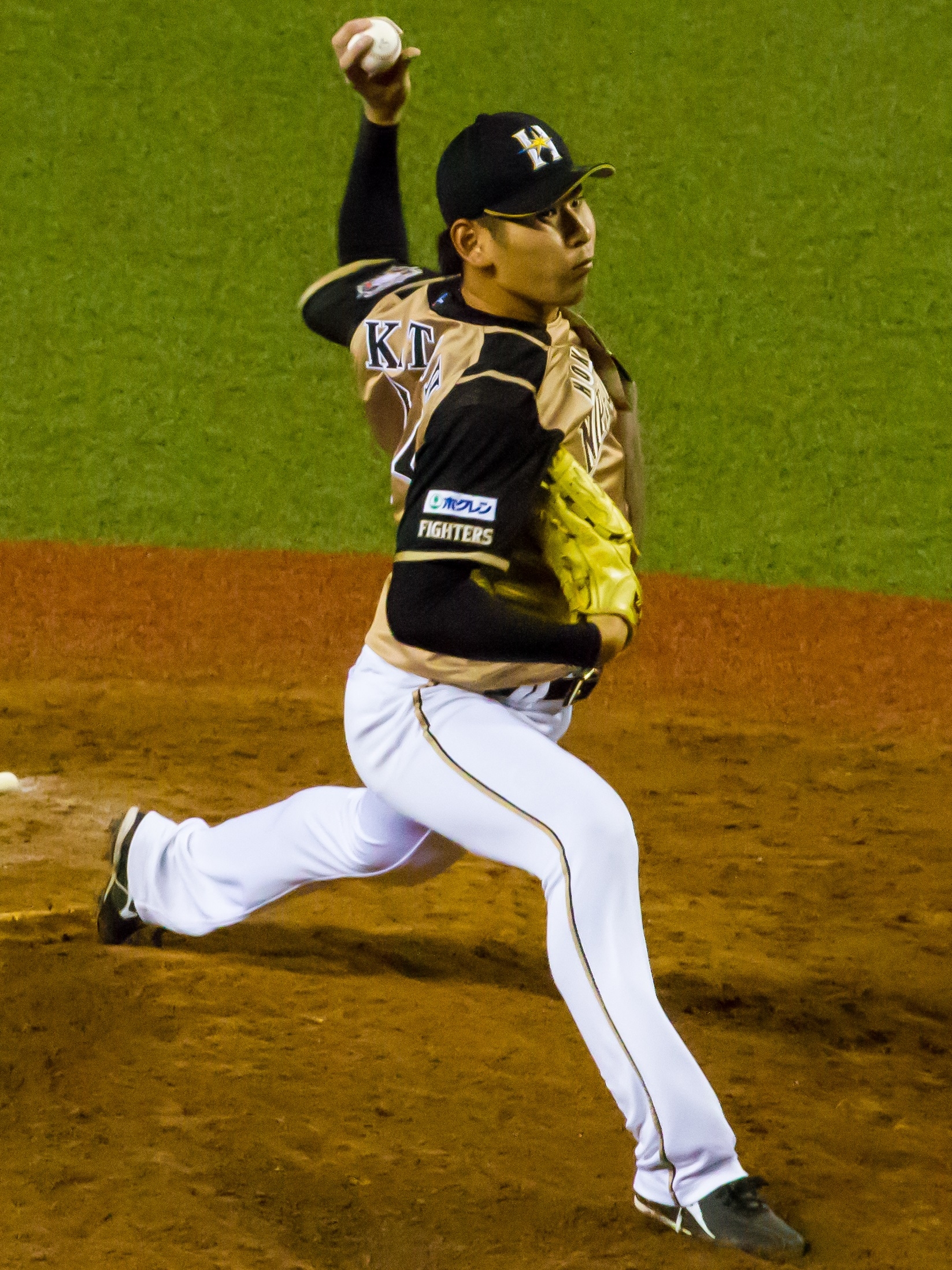

Hokkaido Nippon Ham Fighters – No. 14
- Pitcher
- Born: June 3, 1992 (age 33); Minamibōsō, Chiba, Japan
- Bats: Left Throws: Left

NPB debut
- March 26, 2016, for the Hokkaido Nippon-Ham Fighters

NPB statistics (through 2024 season)
- Win–loss record: 58–58
- Earned run average: 3.17
- Strikeouts: 752
- Saves: 0
- Holds: 7
- Stats at Baseball Reference

Teams
- Hokkaido Nippon-Ham Fighters (2016–present)

Career highlights and awards
- NPB All-Star (2023)

Takayuki Katoh (加藤 貴之, Katō Takayuki; born June 3, 1992) is a professional Japanese baseball pitcher for the Hokkaido Nippon-Ham Fighters of Nippon Professional Baseball (NPB).

== Career ==
Kato made his Nippon Professional Baseball (NPB) debut in 2016 with the Hokkaido Nippon-Ham Fighters.

In the 2022 season, Kato made 22 appearances and posted an 8-7 record and 2.01 ERA with 98 strikeouts in 147.2 innings pitched. In addition, he set an NPB record by only issuing 11 walks all season. The previous record was set by Jiro Noguchi during the 1950 season.
