= Kamoike Ballpark =

Stadium in Yojiro, Kagoshima Prefecture, Japan

Coordinates: 31°33′52.39″N 130°33′28.63″E

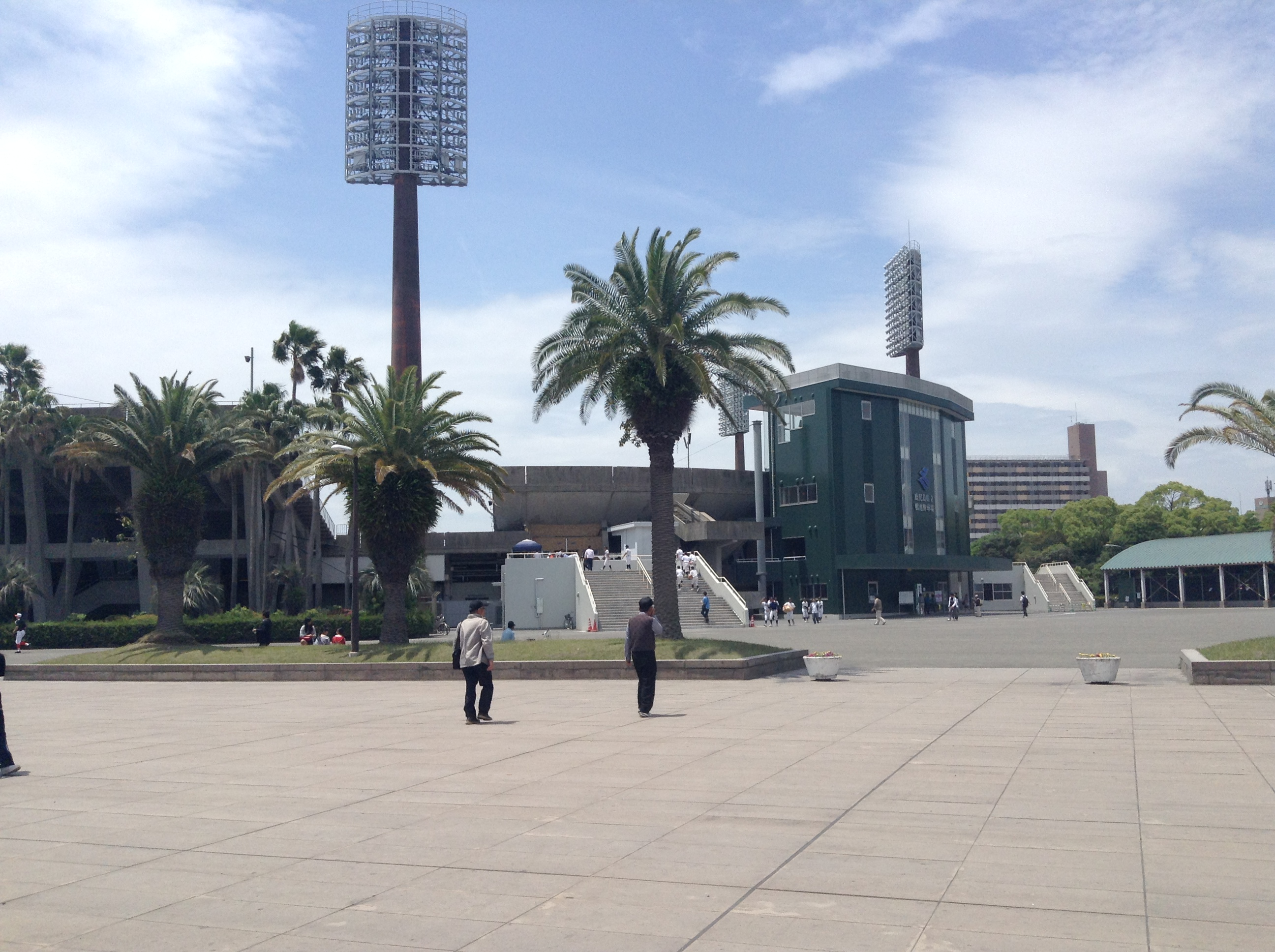

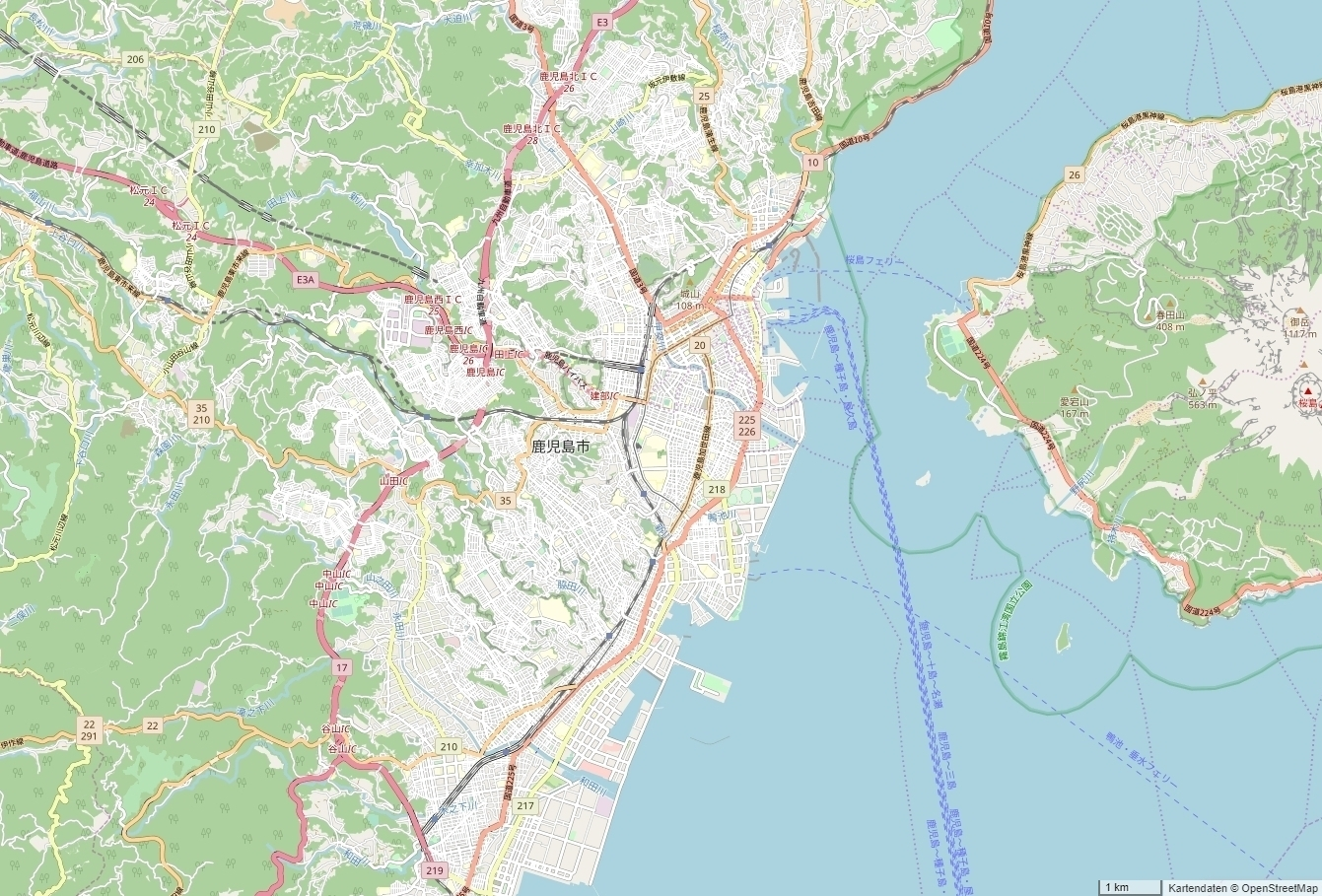
- Location within Kagoshima, Kagoshima Location within Kagoshima Prefecture Location within Japan
- Full name: Kamoike Kagoshima Prefectural Baseball Stadium
- Location: Kagoshima, Japan
- Capacity: 21,000

Construction
- Opened: 1970

Kamoike Ballpark, also known as Kamoike Kagoshima Prefectural Baseball Stadium, is a multi-purpose stadium in Kagoshima, Japan. It is currently used mostly for baseball matches. The stadium was originally opened in 1970 and has a capacity of 21,000 spectators.
