= Daiki Tajima =

Japanese baseball player (born 1996)

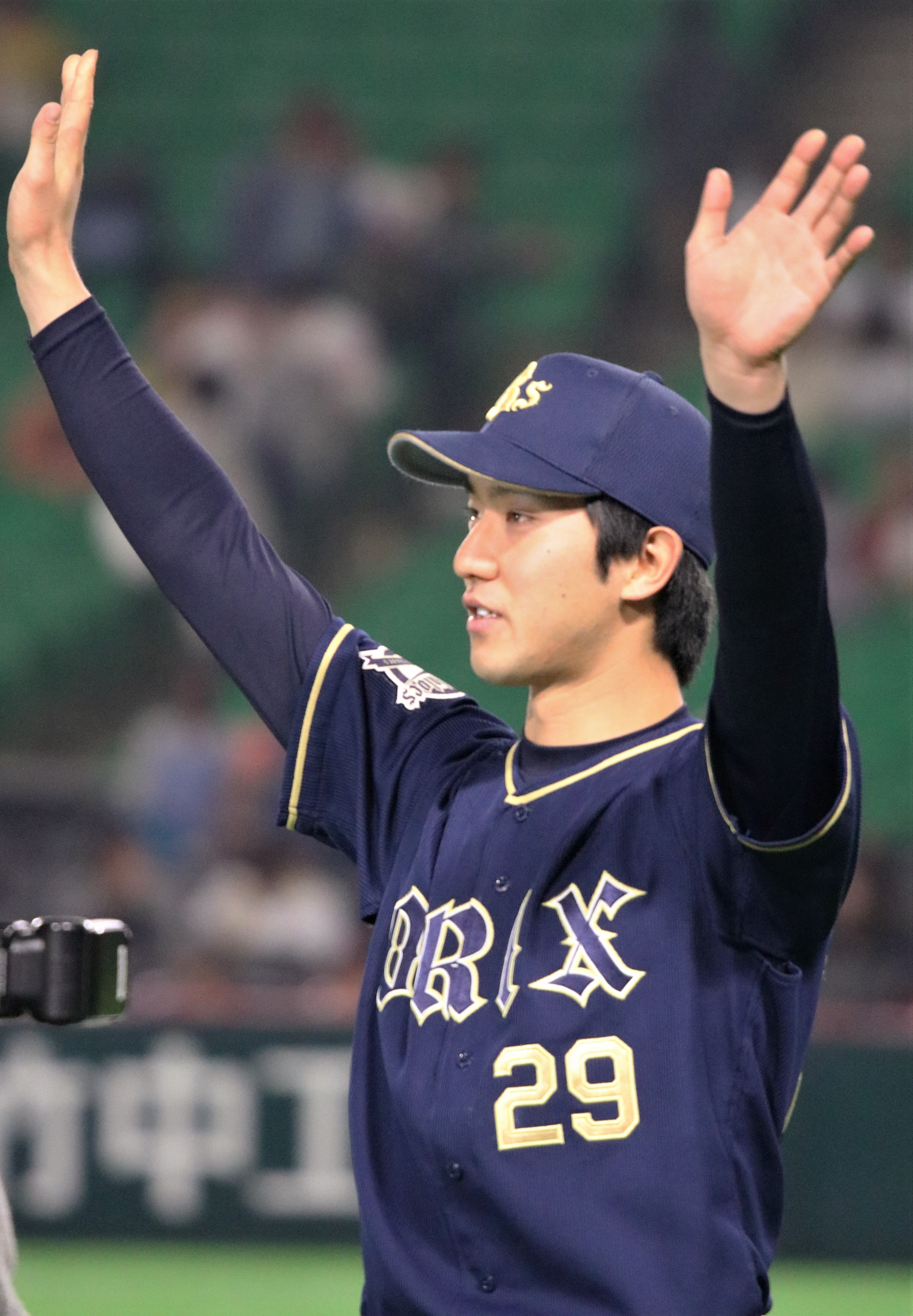

Orix Buffaloes – No. 29
- Pitcher
- Born: August 3, 1996 (age 30); Utsunomiya, Tochigi, Japan
- Bats: Left Throws: Left

NPB debut
- March 31, 2018, for the Orix Buffaloes

Career statistics (through 2022 season)
- Win–loss record: 30-24
- Earned run average: 3.52
- Strikeouts: 425
- Stats at Baseball Reference

Teams
- Orix Buffaloes (2018–present)

Career highlights and awards
- Japan Series champion (2022)

Daiki Tajima (田嶋 大樹, Tajima Daiki; born August 3, 1996) is a professional Japanese baseball player. He plays pitcher for the Orix Buffaloes.
