= Ryuya Matsumoto (baseball, born 1999) =

Japanese baseball player (born 1999)

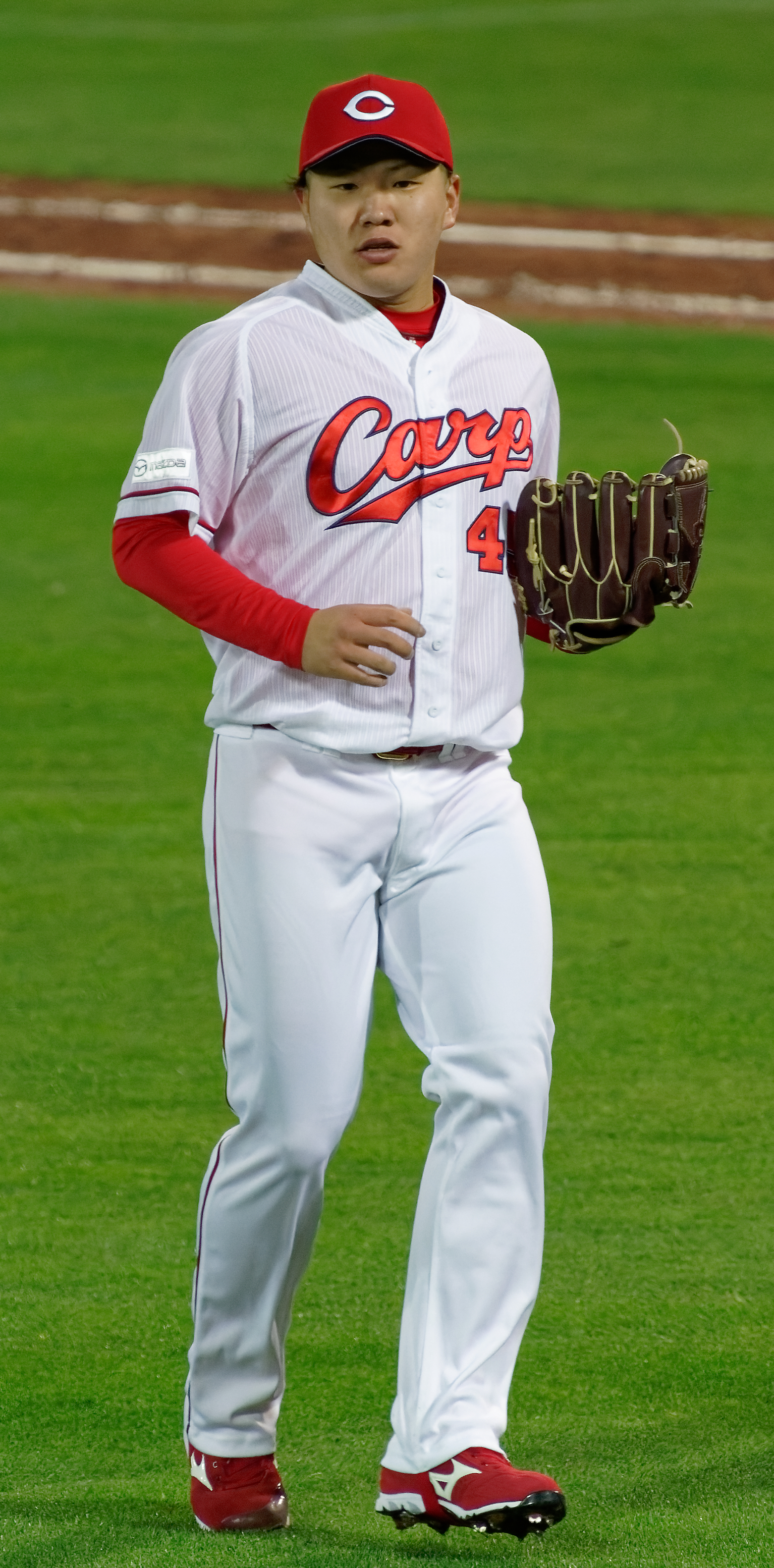

Hiroshima Toyo Carp – No. 45
- Pitcher
- Born: September 18, 1999 (age 27); Sakurai, Nara, Japan
- Bats: Right Throws: Right

NPB debut
- March 26, 2022, for the Hiroshima Toyo Carp

Career statistics (through April 3, 2022)
- Win–loss record: 0–0
- Earned run average: 6.00
- Strikeouts: 2

Teams
- Hiroshima Toyo Carp (2022–present)

Ryuya Matsumoto (松本 竜也, Matsumoto Ryuya; born September 18, 1999, in Sakurai, Nara, Japan) is a professional Japanese baseball player. He is a pitcher for the Hiroshima Toyo Carp of Nippon Professional Baseball (NPB).
