= Haruka Nemoto =

Japanese baseball player (born 2003)

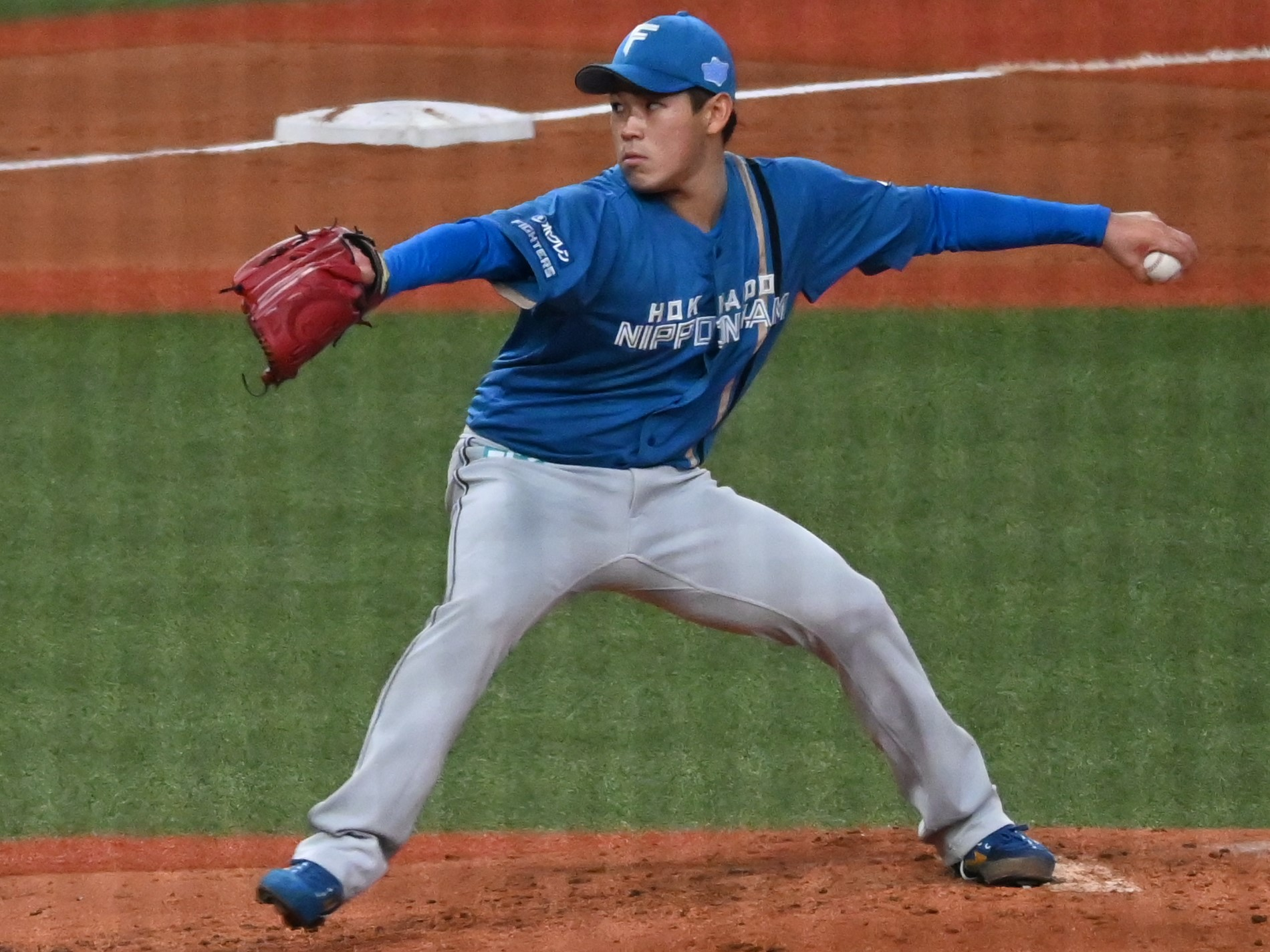

Hokkaido Nippon-Ham Fighters – No. 59
- Pitcher
- Born: March 31, 2003 (age 22); Shiraoi, Hokkaido, Japan
- Bats: Left Throws: Left

NPB debut
- March 25, 2022, for the Hokkaido Nippon-Ham Fighters

Career statistics (through April 1, 2022)
- Win–loss record: 0–1
- Earned run average: 1.93
- Strikeouts: 5

Teams
- Hokkaido Nippon-Ham Fighters (2022–present)

Haruka Nemoto (根本悠楓, Nemoto Haruka; born March 31, 2003) is a professional Japanese baseball player. He is a pitcher for the Hokkaido Nippon-Ham Fighters of Nippon Professional Baseball (NPB).
