= Kona Takahashi =

Japanese baseball player (born 1997)

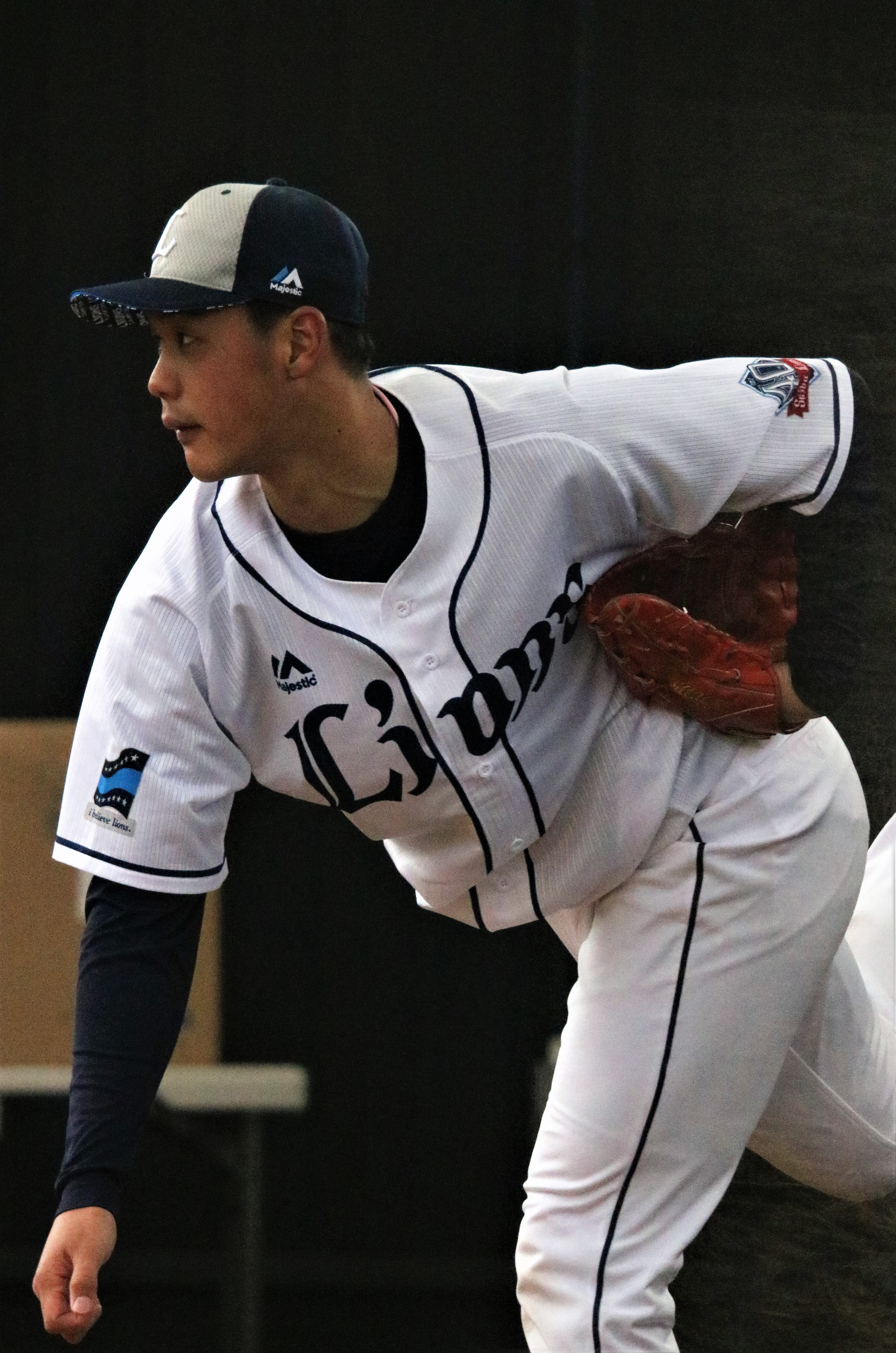
- Takahashi with the Saitama Seibu Lions

Saitama Seibu Lions – No. 13
- Pitcher
- Born: February 3, 1997 (age 29); Numata, Gunma, Japan
- Bats: Right Throws: Right

NPB debut
- August 2, 2015, for the Saitama Seibu Lions

NPB statistics (through August 21, 2026)
- Win–loss record: 81-82
- Earned run average: 3.30
- Strikeouts: 964
- Stats at Baseball Reference

Teams
- Saitama Seibu Lions (2015–present)

Career highlights and awards
- NPB All-Star (2019)
Medals
Men's baseball
Representing Japan
18U Baseball World Cup
Silver medal – second place	2013 Taichung	Team

Kona Takahashi (高橋 光成, Takahashi Kōna; born February 3, 1997) is a Japanese professional baseball pitcher for the Saitama Seibu Lions of Nippon Professional Baseball (NPB).

== Career ==
Takahashi was a member of the Melbourne Aces of the Australian Baseball League for the 2017–18 season.

Takahashi made 26 appearances for the Saitama Seibu Lions in 2022, compiling a 12–8 record and 2.20 ERA with 128 strikeouts across 175 2/3 innings pitched. In 2023, he pitched in 23 games, accumulating a 10–8 record and 2.21 ERA with 120 strikeouts across 155 innings pitched.

Takahashi struggled in 2024, with a 0-11 record and a 3.87 ERA, and spent time in the minor leagues. After bouncing back in 2025, with an ERA under 3 in late August, reports emerged that the Seibu Lions were planning on posting Takahashi for Major League Baseball (MLB) at the season's end. The Lions posted Takahashi, but he did not reach an agreement with an MLB team during the posting window and returned to the Lions.
