= Kaito Yoza =

Japanese baseball player (born 1995)

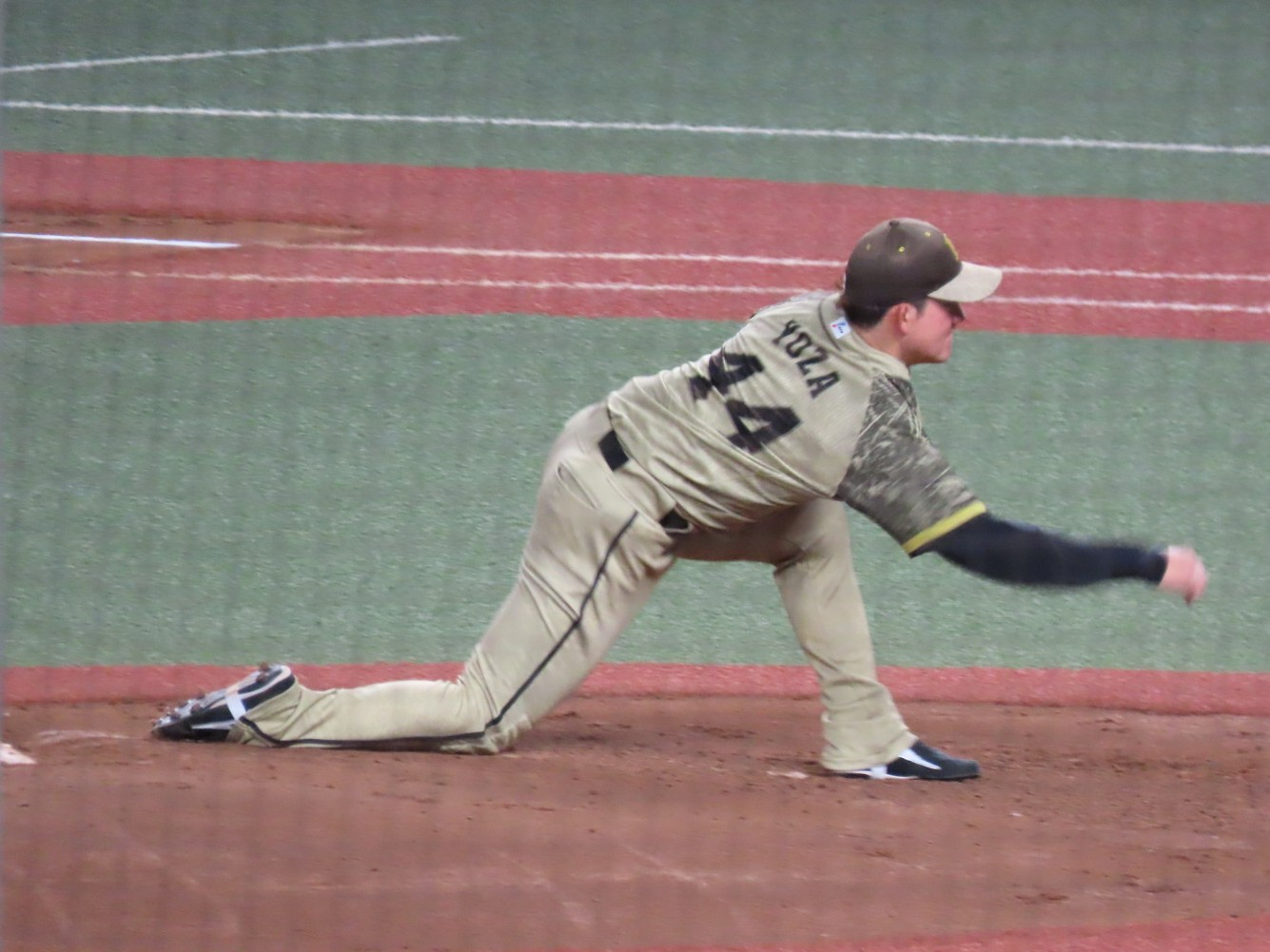

Saitama Seibu Lions – No. 15
- Pitcher
- Born: September 15, 1995 (age 30); Urasoe, Okinawa, Japan
- Bats: Right Throws: Right

NPB debut
- June 21, 2020, for the Saitama Seibu Lions

Career statistics (through 2022 season)
- Win–loss record: 13-12
- Earned Run Average: 3.37
- Strikeouts: 107
- Stats at Baseball Reference

Teams
- Saitama Seibu Lions (2020–present)

Kaito Yoza (與座 海人, Yoza Kaito; born September 15, 1995) is a professional Japanese baseball player. He plays pitcher for the Saitama Seibu Lions.
