= Tsuyoshi Yamasaki =

Japanese baseball player (born 1995)

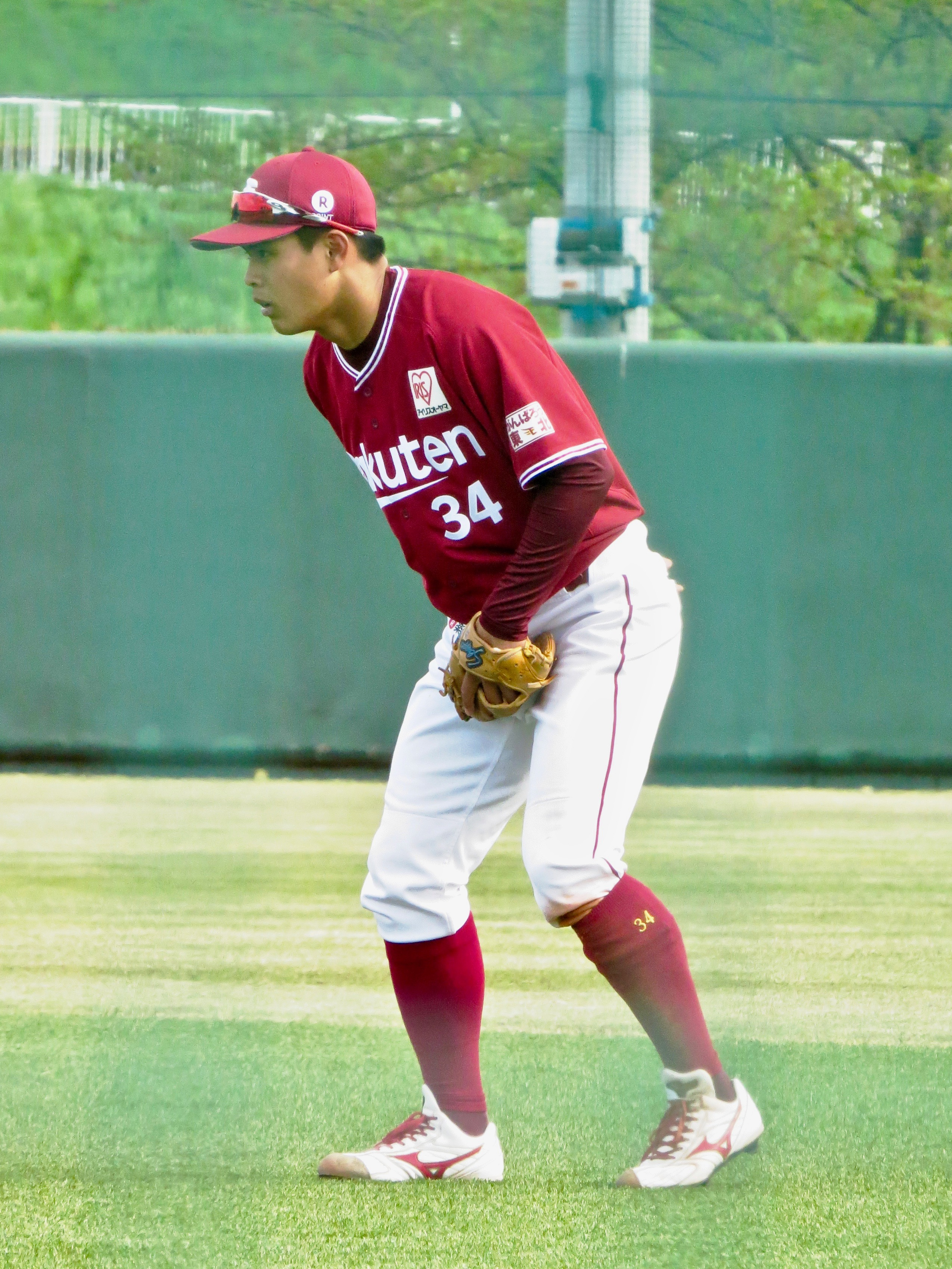

Chiba Lotte Marines – No. 38
- Infielder
- Born: December 29, 1995 (age 30); Fukuoka, Fukuoka, Japan
- Bats: Left Throws: Right

NPB debut
- June 12, 2018, for the Tohoku Rakuten Golden Eagles

NPB statistics (through 2023 season)
- Batting average: .223
- Home runs: 10
- Runs batted in: 66
- Stats at Baseball Reference

Teams
- Tohoku Rakuten Golden Eagles (2018–2025); Chiba Lotte Marines (2026–present)

Tsuyoshi Yamasaki (山﨑 剛, Yamasaki Tsuyoshi; born December 29, 1995) is a professional Japanese baseball player. He plays infielder for the Chiba Lotte Marines.
