= Hiromi Itoh =

Japanese baseball player (born 1997)

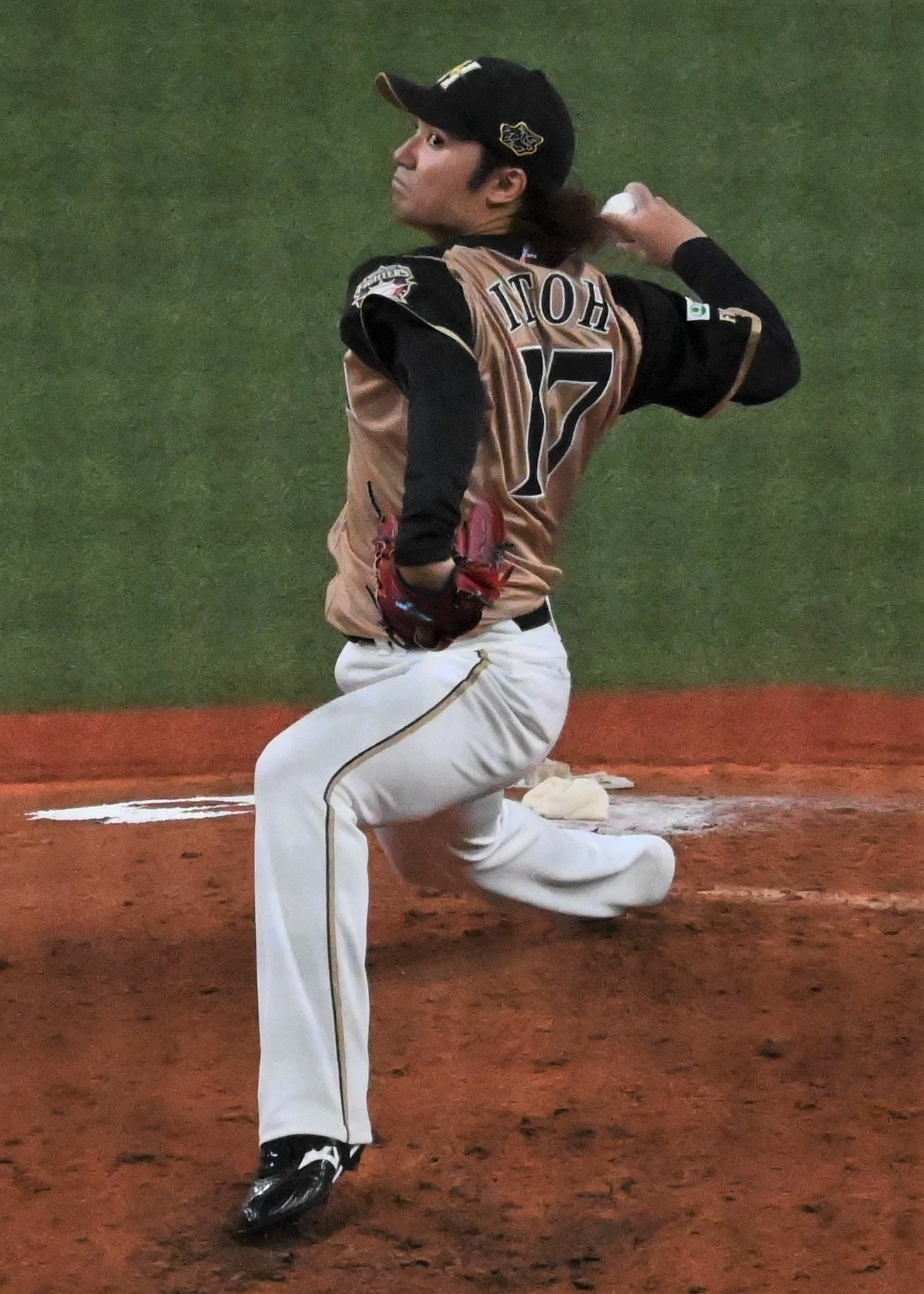
- Itoh in 2021

Hokkaido Nippon Ham Fighters – No. 17
- Pitcher
- Born: August 31, 1997 (age 29); Kayabe, Hokkaido, Japan
- Bats: Left Throws: Right

NPB debut
- March 31, 2021, for the Hokkaido Nippon-Ham Fighters

Career statistics (through 2025 season)
- Win–loss record: 55-41
- Earned Run Average: 2.87
- Strikeouts: 743
- Saves: 1
- Holds: 1
- Stats at Baseball Reference

Teams
- Hokkaido Nippon-Ham Fighters (2021–present)

Career highlights and awards
- Eiji Sawamura Award (2025); Pacific League Special Award (2021); Interleague play PL Nippon Life Award Winner (2021); 1× NPB All-Star (2022)
Medals
Men's baseball
Representing Japan
Summer Olympics
Gold medal – first place	2020 Tokyo	Team
World Baseball Classic
Gold medal – first place	2023 Miami	Team
WBSC Premier12
Silver medal – second place	2024	Team

Hiromi Itoh (伊藤 大海, Itō Hiromi; born August 31, 1997) is a professional Japanese baseball player. He plays pitcher for the Hokkaido Nippon-Ham Fighters.

On November 1, 2026, the Fighters posted Itoh to Major League Baseball, giving him two months to sign with a team.
