= Yoshinobu Mizukami =

Japanese baseball player (born 1998)

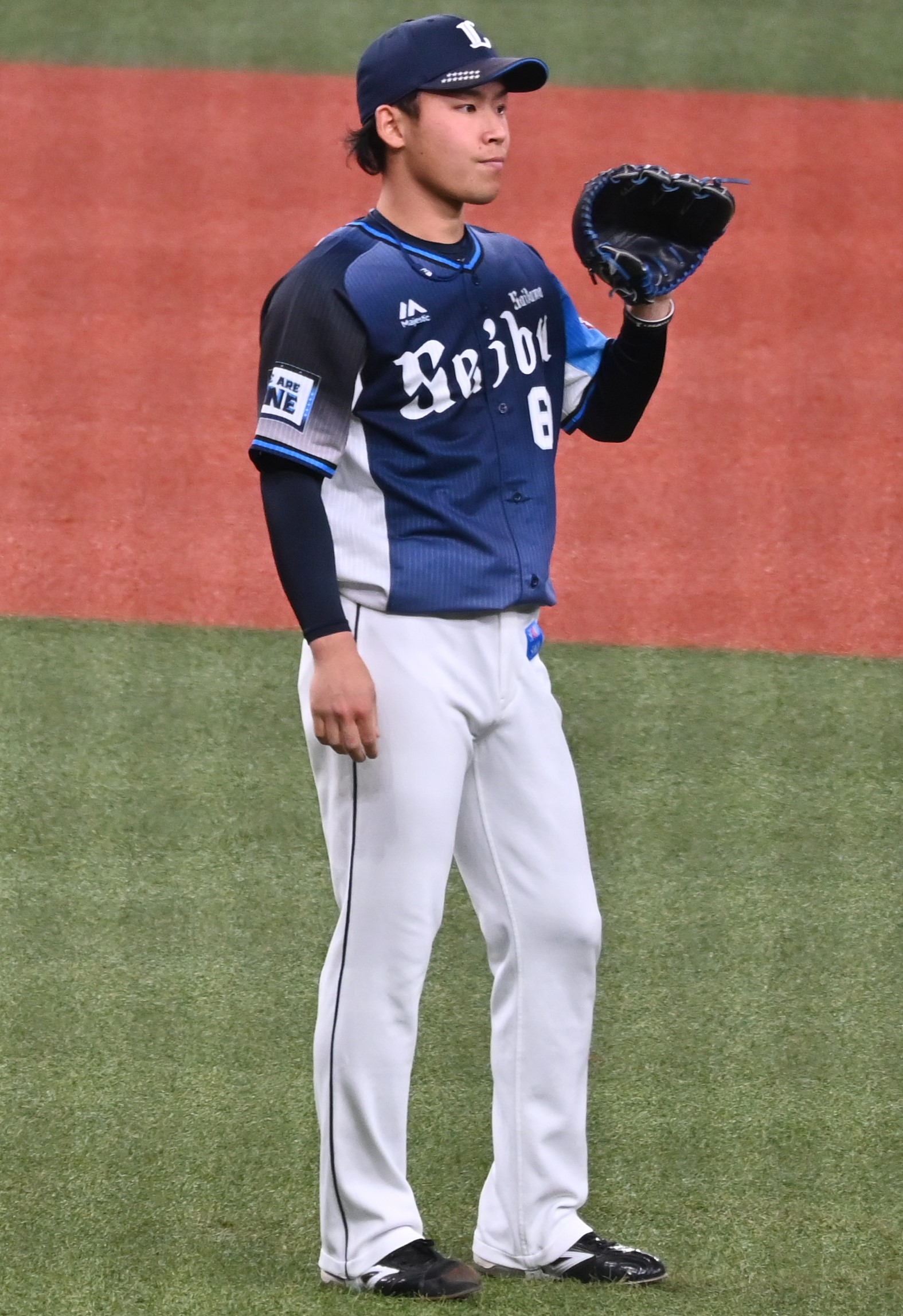

Saitama Seibu Lions – No. 69
- Pitcher
- Born: July 13, 1998 (age 27); Miyada, Nagano, Japan
- Bats: Right Throws: Right

NPB debut
- June 11, 2021, for the Saitama Seibu Lions

Career statistics (through 2023 season)
- Win–loss record: 4–7
- Earned run average: 1.98
- Strikeouts: 75
- Saves: 2
- Holds: 40
- Stats at Baseball Reference

Teams
- Saitama Seibu Lions (2021–present)

Career highlights and awards
- 1× NPB All-Star (2022); 2022 Pacific League Rookie of the Year

Yoshinobu Mizukami (水上 由伸, Mizukami Yoshinobu; born July 13, 1998, in Miyada, Nagano, Japan) is a professional Japanese baseball player. He is a pitcher for the Saitama Seibu Lions of Nippon Professional Baseball (NPB).
