= Ren Wada =

Japanese baseball player (born 1995)

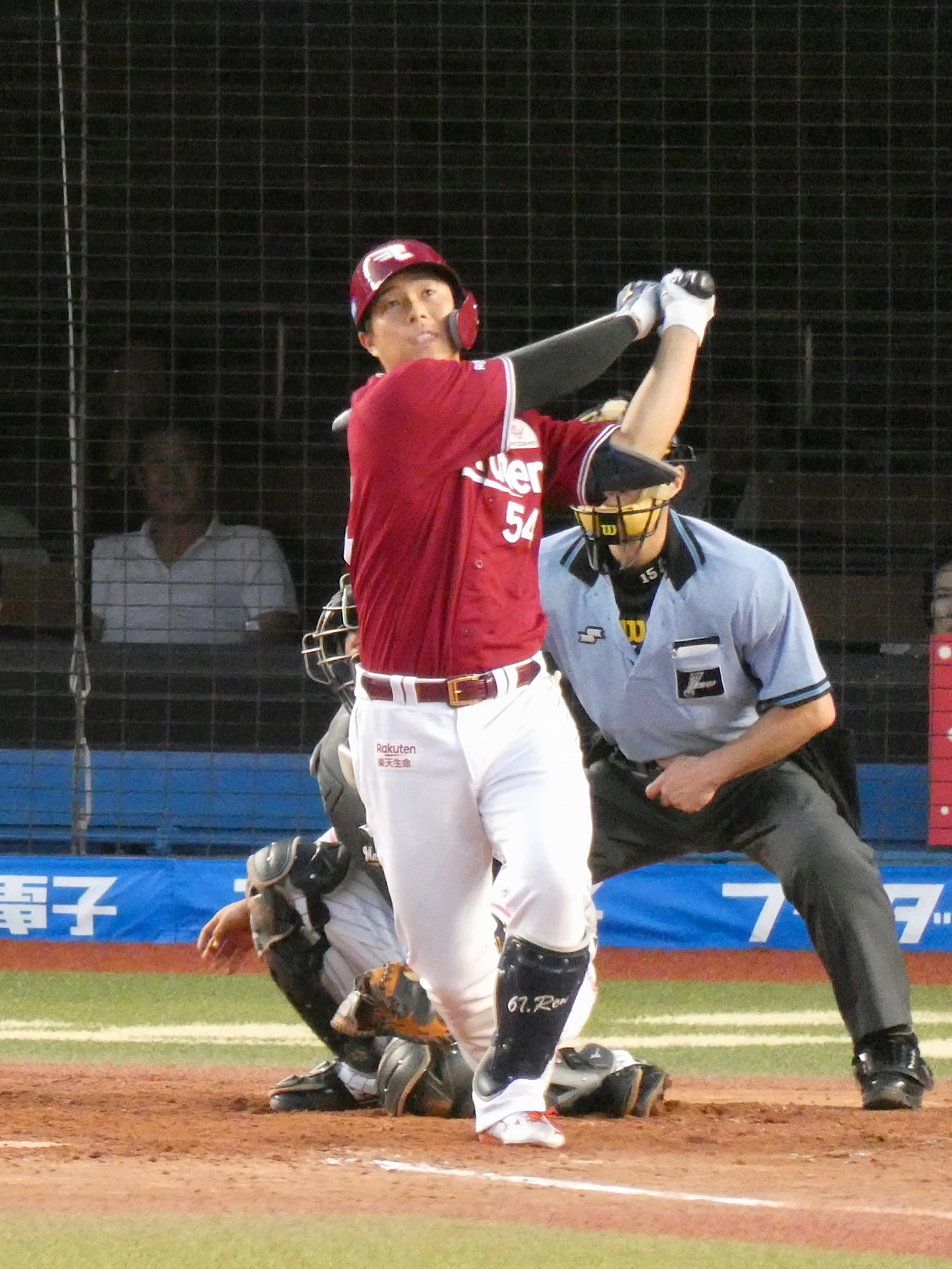
- Outfielder
- Born: September 26, 1995 (age 30); Tosa District, Kōchi, Japan
- Bats: Right Throws: Right

NPB debut
- June 15, 2018, for the Yomiuri Giants

NPB statistics (through 2020 season)
- Batting average: .229
- Hits: 30
- Home runs: 2
- Runs batted in: 12
- Stolen base: 0

Teams
- Yomiuri Giants (2014–2019); Tohoku Rakuten Golden Eagles (2019–2023)

Ren Wada (和田 恋, Wada Ren; born September 26, 1995 in Tosa, Kōchi, Japan) is a professional Japanese baseball player. He plays outfielder for the Tohoku Rakuten Golden Eagles.
