= 2022 Nippon Professional Baseball draft =

Japanese baseball draft event

2022 Nippon Professional Baseball Draft
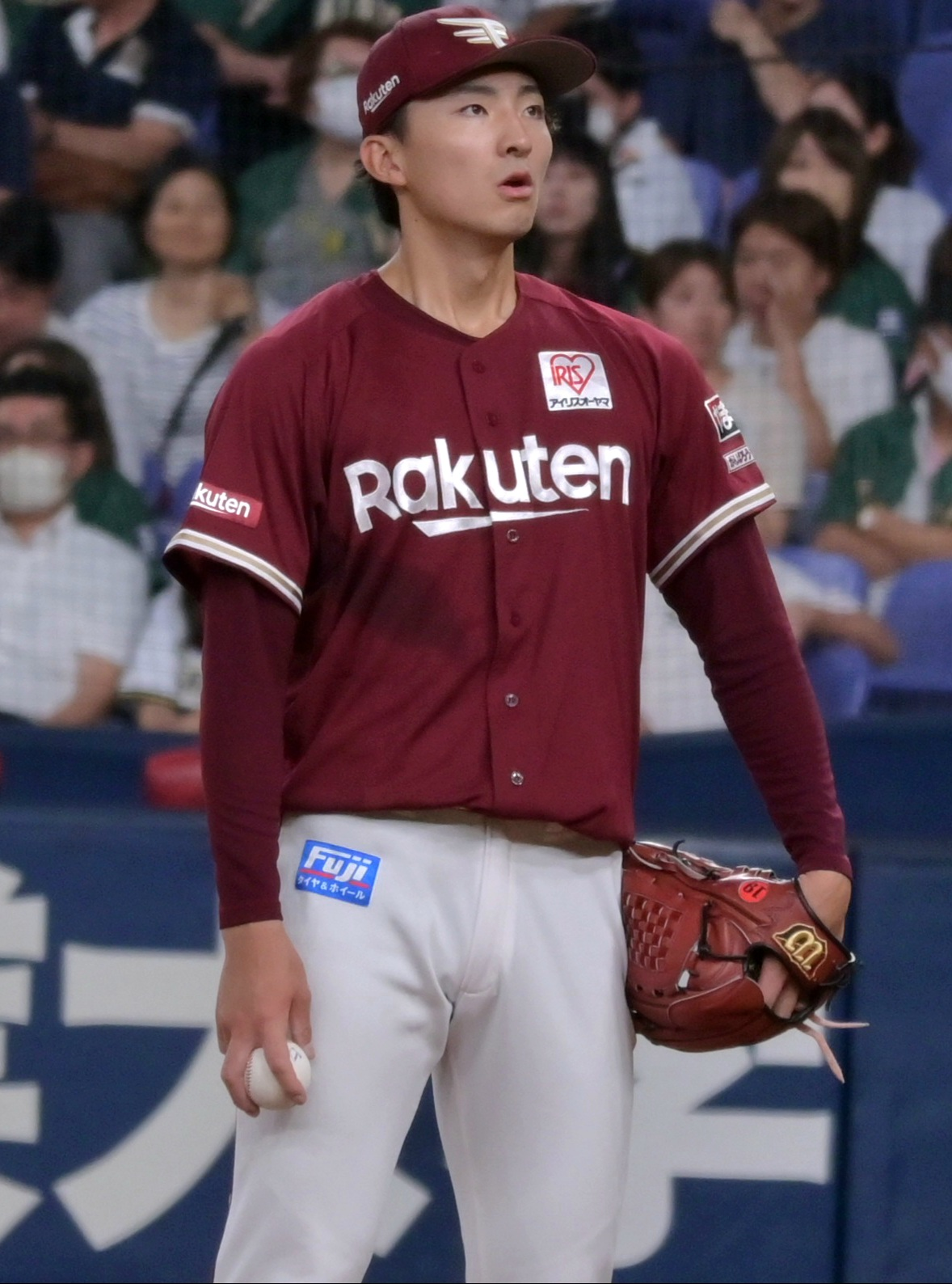
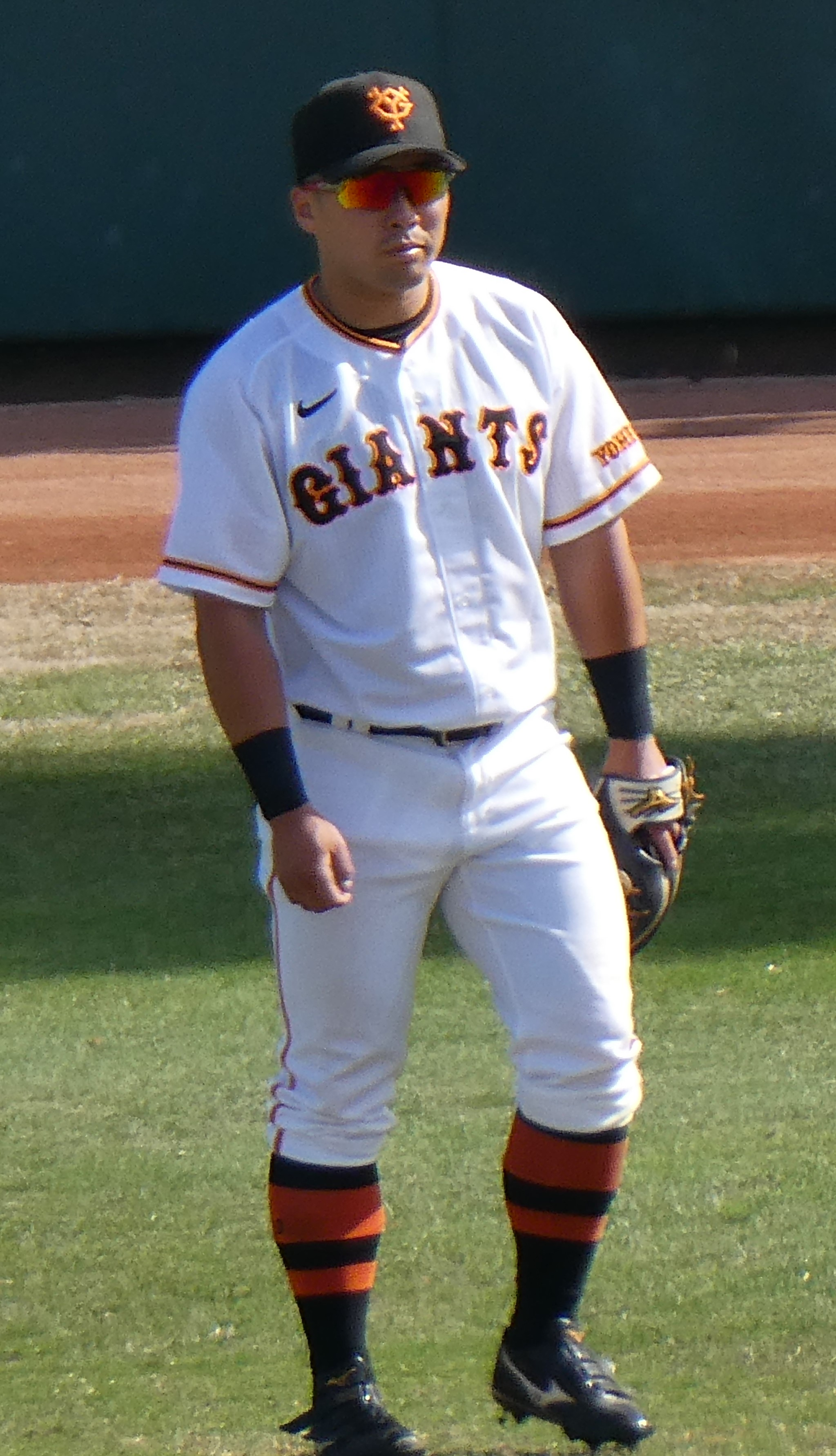
- Kosei Shoji and Shōgo Asano, who was nominated and a bid lottery.

General information
- Sport: Baseball
- Date: October 20, 2022
- Location: Grand Prince Hotel Takanawa, Tokyo
- Networks: TBS (first round), sky-A
- Sponsored by: Taisho Pharmaceutical

Overview
- 126 total selections in 21 (Includes draft for developmental players) rounds
- League: Nippon Professional Baseball
- First round selections: Kosei Shoji; Shōgo Asano

The 2022 Nippon Professional Baseball (NPB) Draft was held on October 20, 2022, for the 58th time at the Grand Prince Hotel Takanawa to assign amateur baseball players to the NPB. It was arranged with the special cooperation of Taisho Pharmaceutical with official naming rights. The draft was officially called "The Professional Baseball Draft Meeting supported by Lipovitan D ". It has been sponsored by Taisho Pharmaceutical for the 10th consecutive year since 2013.

== Summary ==
Only the first round picks will be done by bid lottery. from 2019, the Professional Baseball Executive Committee has decided that the Central League and the Pacific League will be given the second round of waiver priority alternately every other year, and in 2022 Pacific League received the waiver priority. From the third round the order was reversed continuing in the same fashion until all picks were exhausted. It ends when all teams are "selected" or when the total number of selected players reaches 120. Also, if the number of players has not reached 120, we will continue to hold a "developmental squad player selection meeting" with the participation of the desired team.

== First Round Contested Picks ==
	Player name	Position	Teams selected by
First Round	**Kosei Shoji**	Pitcher	**Eagles**, Marines
First Round	**Shōgo Asano**	Pitcher	**Giants**, Tigers

- **Bolded** teams indicate who won the right to negotiate contract following a lottery.
- In the first round, **Kota Yazawa** (Outfielder) was selected by the **Fighters**, **Reia Nakachi** (Pitcher) by the **Dragons**, **Yuta Saito** (Pitcher) by the **Carp**, **Takuya Hiruma** (Outfielder) by the **Lions**, **Ihine Itsua** (Intfielder) by the **Hawks**, **Shion Matsuo** (Catcher) by the **BayStars**, **Ryuhei Sotani** (Pitcher) by the **Buffaloes**, and **Kojiro Yoshimura** (Pitcher) by the **Swallows** without a bid lottery.
- In the second round, **Riku Kikuchi** (Pitcher) was selected by the **Marines**, and **Shota Morishita** (Pitcher) by the **Tigers** without a bid lottery.
- List of selected players.

== Selected Players ==
Key
*	Player did not sign

- The order of the teams is the order of second round waiver priority.
- **Bolded** After that, a developmental player who contracted as a registered player under control.
- List of selected players.

=== Hokkaido Nippon-Ham Fighters ===
Pick	Player name	Position	Team
#1	Kota Yazawa	Pitcher	Nippon Sport Science University
#2	Shōma Kanemura	Pitcher	Fuji University
#3	Gosuke Katoh	Infielder	New York Mets
#4	Kanato Anzai	Pitcher	Tokoha University Kigugawa High School
#5	Taiki Narama	Infielder	Rissho University
#6	Haruki Miyauchi	Pitcher	Nippon Paper Industries Ishinomaki
Developmental Player Draft
#1	Taisei Fujita	Outfielder	Hanasaki Tokuharu High School
#2	Terukazu Nakayama	Pitcher	Tokushima Indigo Socks
#3	Ataru Yamaguchi	Outfielder	University of Texas at Tyler
#4	Kōdai Yamamoto	Pitcher	Shinano Grandserows

=== Chunichi Dragons ===
Pick	Player name	Position	Team
#1	Reia Nakachi	Pitcher	Okinawa University
#2	Kaito Muramatsu	Infielder	Meiji University
#3	Akio Moriyama	Pitcher	Anan Hikari High School
#4	Ryūnosuke Yamaasa	Catcher	Seiko Gakuin High School
#5	Shōnosuke Hama	Infielder	Fukui NEXUS Elephants
#6	Mikiya Tanaka	Infielder	Asia University
#7	Hiroki Fukunaga	Infielder	Nippon Shinyaku
Developmental Player Draft
#1	**Shinya Matsuyama**	Pitcher	Hachinohe Gakuin University
#2	Tento Nonaka	Pitcher	North Asia University Meiou High School
#3	**Seishū Higuchi**	Infielder	Saitama Musashi Heat Bears

=== Chiba Lotte Marines ===
Pick	Player name	Position	Team
#1	Riku Kikuchi	Pitcher	Senshu University
#2	Atsuki Tomosugi	Infielder	Tenri University
#3	Haruya Tanaka	Pitcher	Nihon Bunri High School
#4	Shūta Takano	Pitcher	Nippon Express
#5	Yūta Kaneda	Infielder	Urawa Gakuin High School
Developmental Player Draft
#1	Yūto Yoshikawa	Pitcher	Urawa Reimei High School
#2	Kaiki Shirahama	Pitcher	Iizuka High School
#3	Rui Katsumata	Infielder	Fujinomiya Higashi High School
#4	Kaisei Kurokawa	Infielder	Gakuho Ishikawa High School

=== Hiroshima Toyo Carp ===
Pick	Player name	Position	Team
#1	Yūta Saitō	Pitcher	Tomakomai Chuo High School
#2	Shōta Uchida	Infielder	Tone Commercial High School
#3	Takehisa Masuda	Pitcher	Tokyo Gas
#4	Kanato Shimizu	Catcher	Takasaki University of Health and Welfare Takasaki High School
#5	Kei Kawano	Pitcher	Osaka Gas
#6	Ginji Hasebe	Pitcher	Toyota
#7	Shū Kubo	Outfielder	Osaka University of Tourism
Developmental Player Draft
#1	Norihiko Nabara	Outfielder	Aomori University
#2	**Takahiro Nakamura**	Outfielder	Kyushu Sangyo University
#3	Taiga Tsuji	Pitcher	Nishogakusha University High School

=== Tohoku Rakuten Golden Eagles ===
Pick	Player name	Position	Team
#1	Kosei Shoji	Pitcher	Rikkyo University
#2	Ryuji Komago	Pitcher	Saginomiya Seisakusyo
#3	Shota Watanabe	Pitcher	Kyushu Sangyo University
#4	Mao Itoh	Pitcher	Tokyo University of Agriculture Okhotsk
#5	Ryūya Taira	Infielder	NTT West
#6	Yūki Hayashi	Pitcher	Seino Transportation
Developmental Player Draft
#1	**Kōnosuke Tatsumi**	Infielder	Seinan Gakuin University
#2	Kōsei Koga	Pitcher	Shimonoseki International High School
#3	Akihiro Takeshita	Pitcher	Hakodate University
#4	Sōtarō Nagata	Infielder	National Taiwan University of Sport

=== Yomiuri Giants ===
Pick	Player name	Position	Team
#1	Shōgo Asano	Outfielder	Takamatsu Commercial High School
#2	Masaya Hagio	Outfielder	Keio University
#3	Chiharu Tanaka	Pitcher	Kokugakuin University
#4	Makoto Kadowaki	Infielder	Sōka University
#5	Hiromasa Funabasama	Pitcher	Seino Transportation
Developmental Player Draft
#1	**Hayate Matsui**	Pitcher	Meisei University
#2	Tomoki Tamura	Pitcher	Sakata Minami High School
#3	Yusefu Yoshimura	Pitcher	Meitoku Gijyuku High School
#4	Ayumu Nakata	Infielder	Touoh Gijyuku High School
#5	Hakuto Aizawa	Infielder	Toin Gakuen High School
#6	Rui Mitsuka	Outfielder	Kiryu Daiichi High School
#7	Gen Ohshiro	Outfielder	Mirai Okinawa High School
#8	Rio Kitamura	Pitcher	Kiryu Daiichi High School
#9	Tessei Morimoto	Pitcher	Municipal Funabashi High School

=== Saitama Seibu Lions ===
Pick	Player name	Position	Team
#1	Takuya Hiruma	Outfielder	Waseda University
#2	Yudai Furukawa	Outfielder	Saeki Kakujyo High School
#3	Kaito Noda	Catcher	Kyushu Sangyo University High School
#4	Minato Aoyama	Pitcher	Asia University
#5	Haruto Yamada	Pitcher	Omi High School
#6	Ryōsuke Kodama	Infielder	Osaka Gas
Developmental Player Draft
#1	Kazuki Nomura	Infielder	Ishikawa Million Stars
#2	Montel Higuma	Outfielder	Tokushima Indigo Socks
#3	Daiki Miura	Pitcher	Chukyo University
#4	Ryōsuke Koresawa	Catcher	Hosei University

=== Hanshin Tigers ===
Pick	Player name	Position	Team
#1	Shota Morishita	Outfielder	Chuo University
#2	Keito Monbetsu	Pitcher	Tokai University High School
#3	Hinase Itsubo	Outfielder	Kanto Daiichi High School
#4	Hidetoshi Ibaragi	Pitcher	Teikyo Nagaoka High School
#5	Reiji Toi	Infielder	Tenri High School
#6	Ren Tomida	Pitcher	Mitsubishi Motors Okazaki
Developmental Player Draft
#1	**Kyosuke Noguchi**	Outfielder	Kyushu Sangyo University

=== Fukuoka SoftBank Hawks ===
Pick	Player name	Position	Team
#1	Ihine Itsua	Infielder	North Asia University Homare High School
#2	Ryosuke Ohtsu	Pitcher	Nippon Steel Kashima
#3	Ikumi Kai	Outfielder	Tohoku Fukushi University
#4	Kazuo Ohno	Pitcher	Oshima High School
#5	Haru Matsumoto	Pitcher	Asia University
#6	Kengo Yoshida	Catcher	Toin University of Yokohama
Developmental Player Draft
#1	Ren Akaba	Pitcher	Kasumigaura High School
#2	kyogo Yamashita	Infielder	Fukuoka University High School
#3	**Hikaru Kimura**	Pitcher	Bukkyo University
#4	Kaito Uchino	Pitcher	Takeda High School
#5	Junpei Okaue	Pitcher	Shikama industry High School
#	Akito Sasaki	Pitcher	Shoin Gakuen Fukushima High School
#7	Souta Minakuchi	Pitcher	Kyoto University
#8	Hayto Miyazaki	Pitcher	Tokyo University of Agriculture
#9	Kaito Shigematsu	Outfielder	Asia University
#10	Jun Maeda	Pitcher	Nippon Bunri University
#11	Kota Sato	Infielder	Hachinohe Gakuin Kosei High School
#12	Yusei Tobita	Infielder	Kanazawa High School
#13	Ayuma Nishio	Pitcher	Chukyo Gakuin University
#14	Ryota Morishima	Catcher	Konan High School

=== Yokohama DeNA Baystars ===
Pick	Player name	Position	Team
#1	Shion Matsuo	Catcher	Osaka Toin High School
#2	Teruki Yoshino	Pitcher	Toyota
#3	Takuma Hayashi	Infielder	Komazawa University
#4	Ryūdai Morishita	Pitcher	Kyoto International
#5	Tatsuya Hashimoto	Pitcher	Keio University
Developmental Player Draft
#1	**Ryota Jōkō**	Catcher	Ehime Mandarin Pirates
#2	Ren Suzuki	Infielder	Shiga Gakuen High School
#3	Ryuto Konno	Pitcher	Tokyo City University Shiojiri High School
#4	Aki Watanabe	Pitcher	Ibaraki Astro Planets
#5	Haruto Kusano	Pitcher	Higashi Nippon International University Shohei High School

=== Orix Buffaloes ===
Pick	Player name	Position	Team
#1	Ryuhei Sotani	Pitcher	Hakuoh University
#2	Hō Naito	Infielder	Japan Aviation High School Ishikawa
#3	Kyōsuke Saitō	Pitcher	Morioka Chuo High School
#4	Ryū Sugisawa	Outfielder	Tohoku Fukushi University
#5	Atsumi Hidaka	Pitcher	Tomishima High School
Developmental Player Draft
#1	Yūsei Nishihama	Pitcher	Gunma Diamond Pegasus
#2	Kaito Saiki	Pitcher	Osaka University of Economics
#3	Kaito Iriyama	Pitcher	Tohoku Fukushi University
#4	**Tokumasa Chano**	Outfielder	Tokushima Indigo Socks
#5	Kyōichirō Murakami	Catcher	Hosei University

=== Tokyo Yakult Swallows ===
Pick	Player name	Position	Team
#1	Kojiro Yoshimura	Pitcher	Toshiba
#2	Ruito Nishimura	Outfielder	Kyoto University of Foreign Studies West High School
#3	Ren Sawai	Outfielder	Chukyo University
#4	Takumi Sakamoto	Pitcher	Ube Technical High School
#5	Keigo Kitamura	Infielder	Chuo University
Developmental Player Draft
#1	Seiya Hashimoto	Catcher	Chuo Gakuin University

Preceded by **2021**	**Nippon Professional Baseball draft**	Succeeded by **2023**
