= Mikiya Tanaka =

Japanese baseball player (born 2000)

Mikiya Tanaka 田中幹也
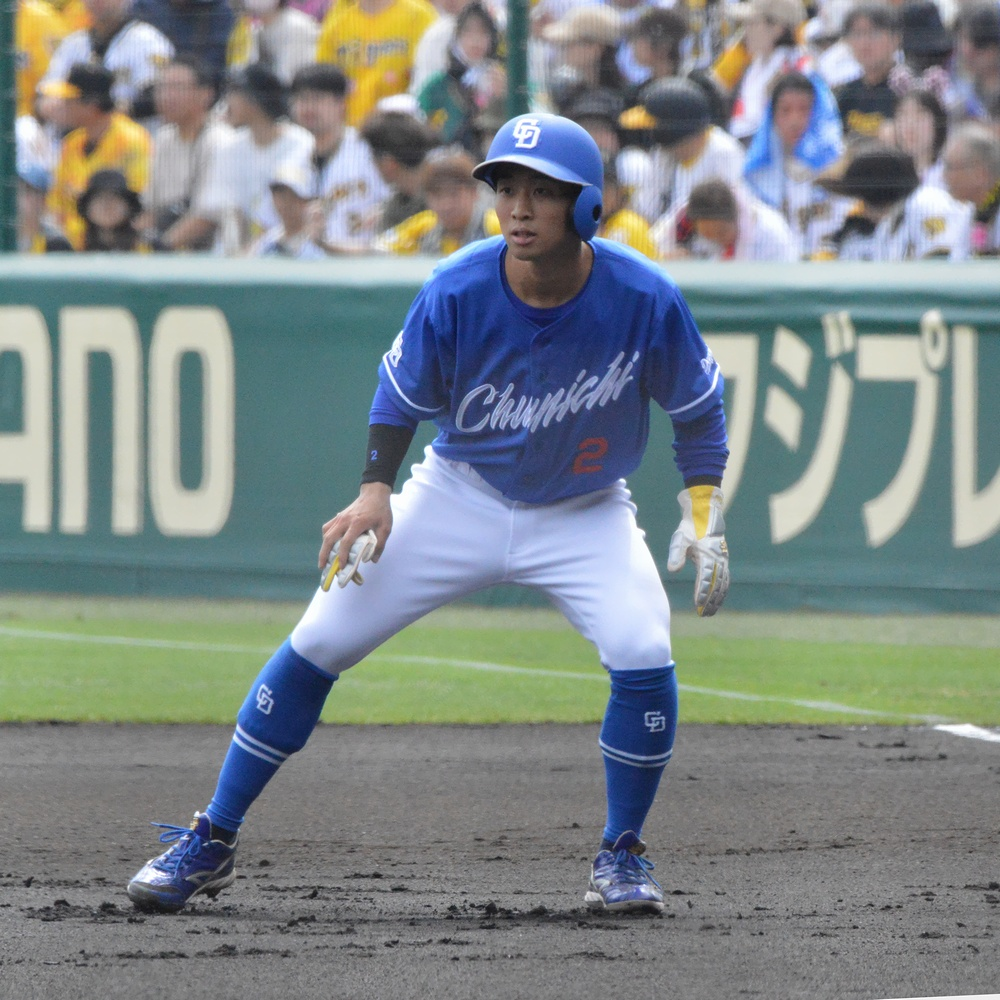

Chunichi Dragons – No. 2
- Infielder
- Born: November 28, 2000 (age 25); Aikawa, Kanagawa, Japan
- Bats: Right Throws: Right

NPB debut
- 29 March, 2024, for the Chunichi Dragons

NPB statistics (through July 21, 2026)
- Batting average: .297
- Home runs: 3
- RBIs: 55

Teams
- Chunichi Dragons (2023–present)

Mikiya Tanaka (田中 幹也, Tanaka Mikiya; born November 28, 2000) is a professional Japanese baseball player. He is currently an infielder for the Chunichi Dragons.

== Early career ==
In elementary school, Tanaka played for Nakatsu Rivers, while in middle school he played for Sagamihara Little Juniors.

While at the prestigious Tokai University Sugao High School, Tanaka was managed by former Chunichi Dragons pitcher, Hiroyasu Wakabayashi. He would get opportunities to play from his freshman year, while in his sophomore year he would help guide his team to victory in the West Tokyo Tournament overcoming Kotaro Kiyomiya's Waseda Jikkyo High School to appear in the annual summer Koshien tournament. His team would reach the semi-finals. He would also appear in the following National Sports Tournament (Kokumin taiiku taikai). At the koshien tournament, Tanaka developed a reputation for his silky defensive skills and baserunning alongside his steady hitting ability.

After graduating high school, Tanaka would join Asia University in the Tohto University Baseball League. He would start his career on the bench in spring of his freshman year, however he would be selected for the Japanese college team to face against the United States alongside Chuo University rival, Shota Morishita. In the time following, Tanaka would start to appear more often at second base and became the regular at short-stop after the graduation of Masaya Yano. In spring of his sophomore year, he was selected in the Best Nine. However, it was at this time he felt something wrong with his body. At the following summer camp, after being stung by a wasp and taken to hospital, he was unexpectedly diagnosed with ulcerative colitis. As treatment via medication would have been a longer path, in Spring he undertook major surgery to remove his large intestine. Due to this, he was in hospital for 2 months, losing 11 kg and only making two plate appearances in the fall league. Tanaka would undergo major rehabilitation and return in spring of his senior year. On 14 April 2022, in the last day of the 2nd week of the season versus Kokugakuin University, he would equal Mitsuru Manaka's record of 6 steals in one game. Tanaka would end the season with half of Asia University's total team steals otherwise breaking records and contributing to large wins.

In the 2022 Nippon Professional Baseball draft, Tanaka was selected in the 6th round by the Chunichi Dragons, and on November 14 signed for a yearly-salary of ¥7,200,000 and a sign-on bonus of ¥35,000,000.

== Professional career ==
=== 2023 ===
Tanaka was selected to train with the first-team in Spring. During spring training games, at one point he led the league in average. However, on March 19 against the Tohoku Rakuten Golden Eagles, he would dislocate his shoulder after trying to return to first-base after a pick-off attempt. Tanaka would rehab in the aftermath, beginning to throw again on 24 June.

On September 7, his rehabilitation hit a snag and he was forbidden from throwing for a week before restarting on the 16 September. As Tanaka was able to do everything but throw, he would return to live games on the 20th of the same month against the Hiroshima Toyo Carp in the Western League, and made his professional debut as a pinch-runner for Nobumasa Fukuda.

On November 8, Tanaka would accept a ¥650,000 decrease in his yearly salary to re-sign at ¥6,550,000 explaining his current injury situation: "I'm able to play defensively in live games and everything is going amazingly well" indicating a desire to break-through as a first-team regular in 2024.

== Play style ==
Tanaka can run 50m in 5.9 seconds and recorded 48 steals in his college career.

Defensively, he uses his small-frame to maximise his agility; his positioning and read of the ball have also been highly praised.

== Personal life ==
Tanaka has said that he wants to emulate former golden glover, Hirokazu Ibata and cites Ryosuke Kikuchi as a player whose movement he wants to learn from.

During his time in high school, his manager nicknamed him saru(monkey) due to his small stature and fast movement. At university he was often nicknamed "ninja" due to his slick baserunning ability.

Tanaka's father was an alumnus of Tokai University Sagami High School and was their captain in 1985. His father's class senior, Hiroyasu Wakabayashi, would become his high school manager.
