= Reia =

Reia may refer to:

- Rhea (mythology)
- Reia, Mozambique
- Reia (programming language)
- Reia Nakachi (仲地 礼亜; born 2001), Japanese baseball player
