= Atsuki =

- Gender: Male

Origin
- Origin: Japanese
- Meaning: Different meanings depending on the kanji used

Atsuki (written: 篤紀, 昌樹 or あつき in hiragana) is a Japanese given name. Notable people with the name include:

- Atsuki Aoyagi (青柳 亮生; born 1999), Japanese professional wrestler
- Atsuki Ito (伊藤 敦樹; born 1998), Japanese footballer
- Atsuki Sato (佐藤 敦紀; born 1961), Japanese film director
- Atsuki Satsukawa (薩川 淳貴; born 1997), Japanese footballer
- Atsuki Taneichi (種市 篤暉; born 1998), Japanese baseball player
- Atsuki Tani (谷 昌樹; born 1959), Japanese voice actor and actor
- Atsuki Tomosugi (友杉 篤輝; born 2000), Japanese baseball player
- Atsuki Wada (和田 篤紀; born 1993), Japanese footballer
- Atsuki Yamanaka (山中 惇希; born 2001), Japanese footballer
- Atsuki Yuasa (湯浅 京己; born 1999), Japanese baseball player
