= MLB Tokyo Series 2025 =

Baseball event in Japan

- Teams: Los Angeles Dodgers; Chicago Cubs
- Date: March 18, 2025 – March 19, 2025; 6:10 a.m. EDT / 7:10 JST (both games)
- Venue: Tokyo Dome
- City: Tokyo, Japan
- Managers: Dave Roberts (Los Angeles Dodgers); Craig Counsell (Chicago Cubs)
- Umpires: Lance Barrett, Mike Estabrook, John Libka, Bill Miller
- Television: Japan: Nippon TV, Prime Video Japan; US: Fox (Game 1), FS1 (Game 2), Fox Deportes (both games)
- TV announcers: US: Jason Benetti (Game 1) and Adam Amin (Game 2) play-by-play; A. J. Pierzynski (both games) color Japan: Kentaro Hiragawa and Koji Uehara
- Radio: WSCR (CHC - English); WRTO (CHC - Spanish); KLAC (LAD - English); KTNQ (LAD - Spanish)

MLB Tokyo Series 2025 was a two-game Major League Baseball (MLB) series between the Los Angeles Dodgers, the defending 2024 World Series champions, and the Chicago Cubs in Tokyo, Japan, at the Tokyo Dome on March 18 and 19, 2025. The series was officially the Tokyo Series presented by Guggenheim due to sponsorship from Guggenheim Partners.

== Background ==
These were the first Major League Baseball (MLB) games to be played in Japan since the 2019 season opened in Japan. MLB has a long history of playing games in Japan, dating back to 1931 when a team of American All-Stars toured the country. This was the sixth MLB season to open in Japan, following opening games in 2000, 2004, 2008, 2012, and 2019. Several notable Japanese players participated in the series, including Shohei Ohtani, Yoshinobu Yamamoto, and Roki Sasaki for the Dodgers, and Shota Imanaga and Seiya Suzuki for the Cubs.

== Broadcast and schedule ==
=== Exhibition games ===
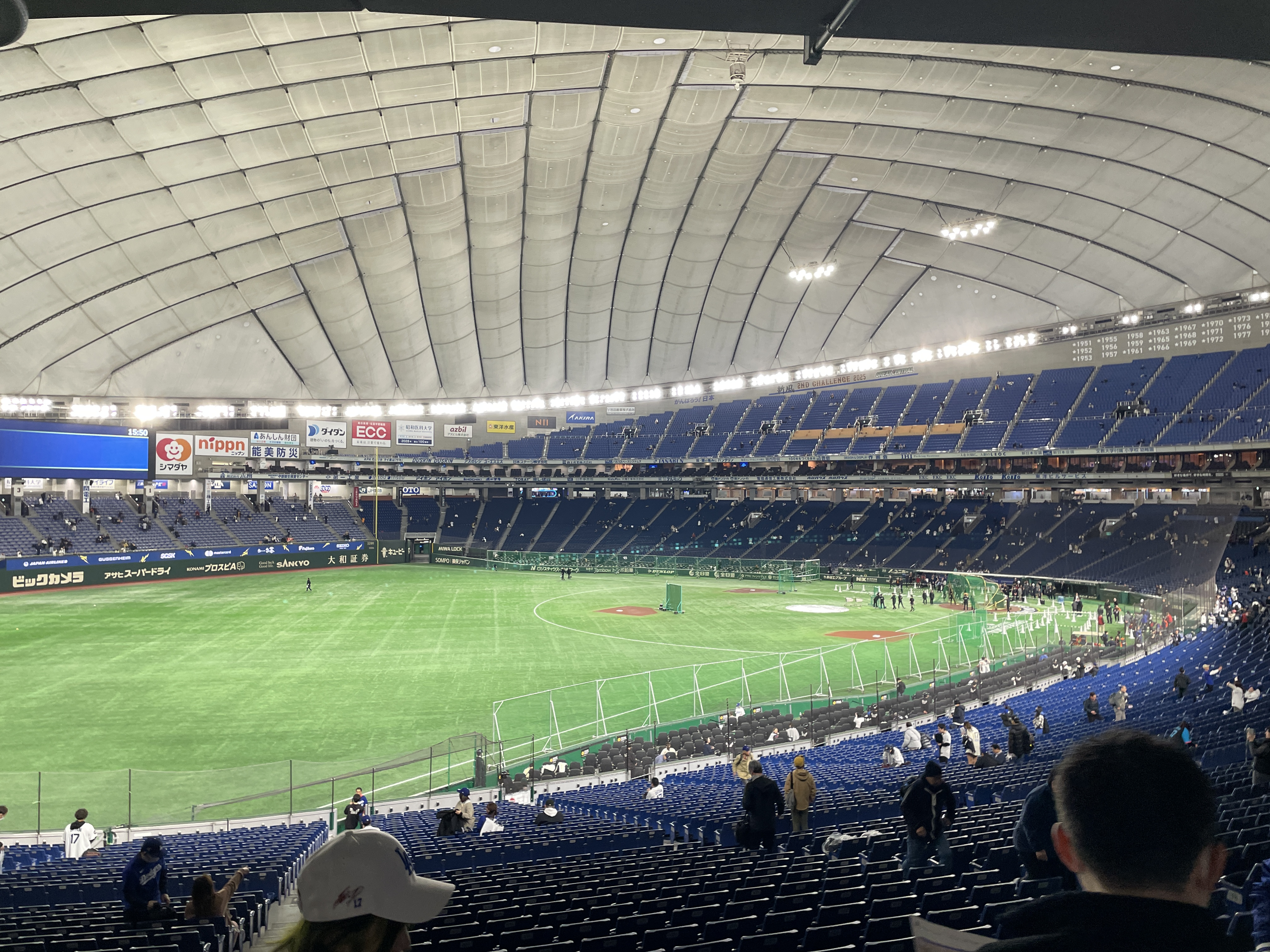
Batting practice before the Dodgers vs Yomiuri Giants exhibition game

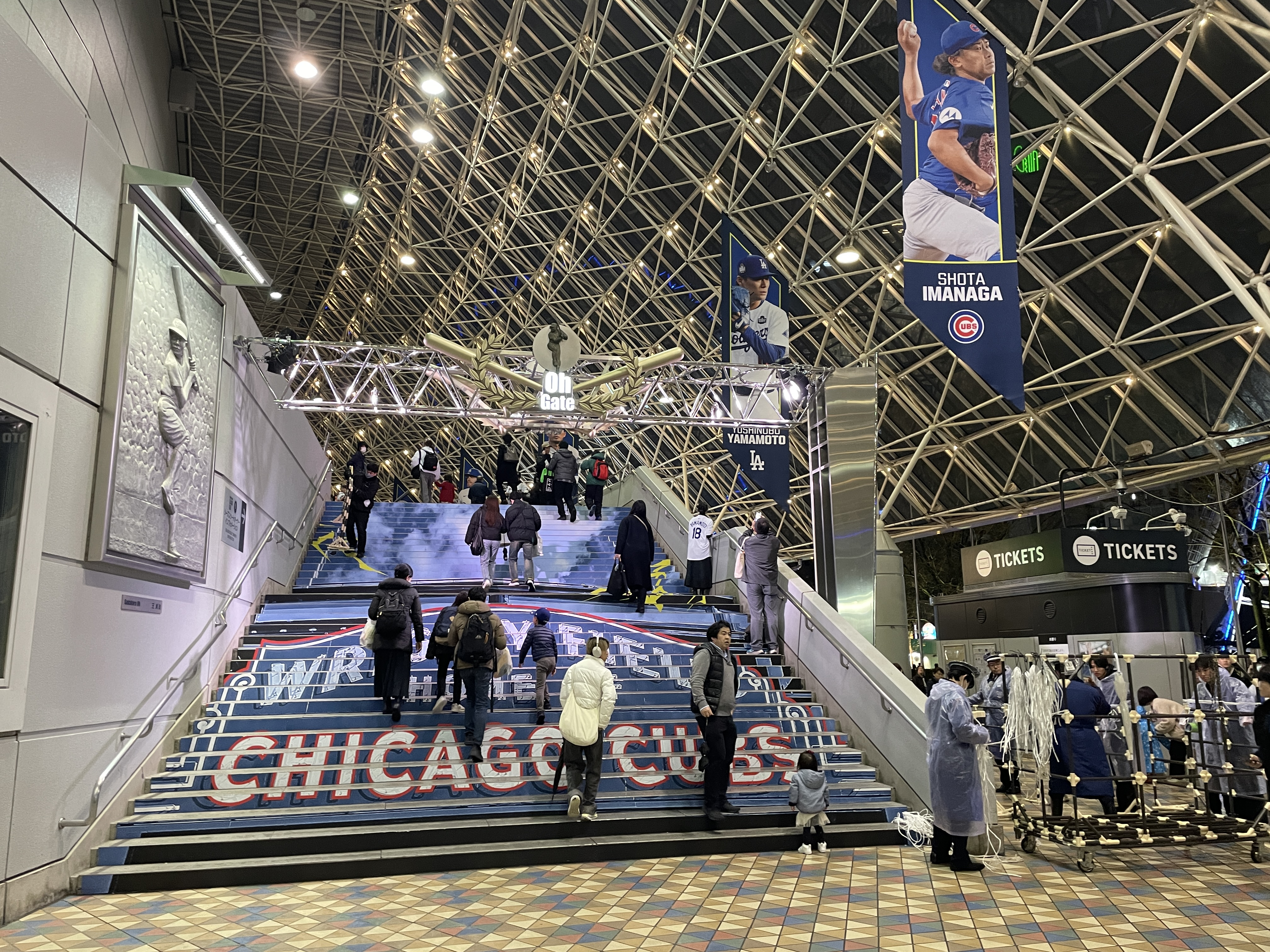
Interior of Tokyo Dome decorated for the series

The Dodgers and Cubs played exhibition games against two Nippon Professional Baseball (NPB) teams, the Hanshin Tigers and the Yomiuri Giants, on March 15 and 16. These exhibition games gave fans an opportunity to see some of the best players from both leagues compete against each other. The exhibitions were aired regionally by SportsNet LA in Los Angeles and Marquee Sports Network in Chicago. Rights in Japan were held by Prime Video Japan. In these four games, the Tigers defeated both the Dodgers and Cubs, while the Dodgers and Cubs each defeated the Giants.

Date	Time	Result	Attendance	Notes	Ref.
March 15, 2025 (Japan)	12:00 p.m. (JST)	Chicago Cubs 0 Hanshin Tigers 3	41,878	WP: Mombetsu, Save: Iwazaki; LP: Thielbar, HR: none	
March 14, 2025 (US)	11:00 p.m. (EDT)	Chicago Cubs 0 Hanshin Tigers 3	41,878	WP: Mombetsu, Save: Iwazaki; LP: Thielbar, HR: none	
March 15, 2025	7:00 p.m. (JST)	Los Angeles Dodgers 5 Yomiuri Giants 1	42,064	WP: Wrobleski, Save: none LP: Togo, HR: Conforto, Ohtani, T. Hernández	
March 15, 2025	6:00 a.m. (EDT)	Los Angeles Dodgers 5 Yomiuri Giants 1	42,064	WP: Wrobleski, Save: none LP: Togo, HR: Conforto, Ohtani, T. Hernández	
March 16, 2025 (Japan)	12:00 p.m. (JST)	Los Angeles Dodgers 0 Hanshin Tigers 3	42,095	WP: Saiki, Save: Ishii; LP: Snell, HR: Sato	
March 15, 2025 (US)	11:00 p.m. (EDT)	Los Angeles Dodgers 0 Hanshin Tigers 3	42,095	WP: Saiki, Save: Ishii; LP: Snell, HR: Sato	
March 16, 2025	7:00 p.m. (JST)	Chicago Cubs 4 Yomiuri Giants 2	42,026	WP: Taillon, Save: none LP: Griffin, HR: none	
March 16, 2025	6:00 a.m. (EDT)	Chicago Cubs 4 Yomiuri Giants 2	42,026	WP: Taillon, Save: none LP: Griffin, HR: none	

=== Tokyo Series games ===
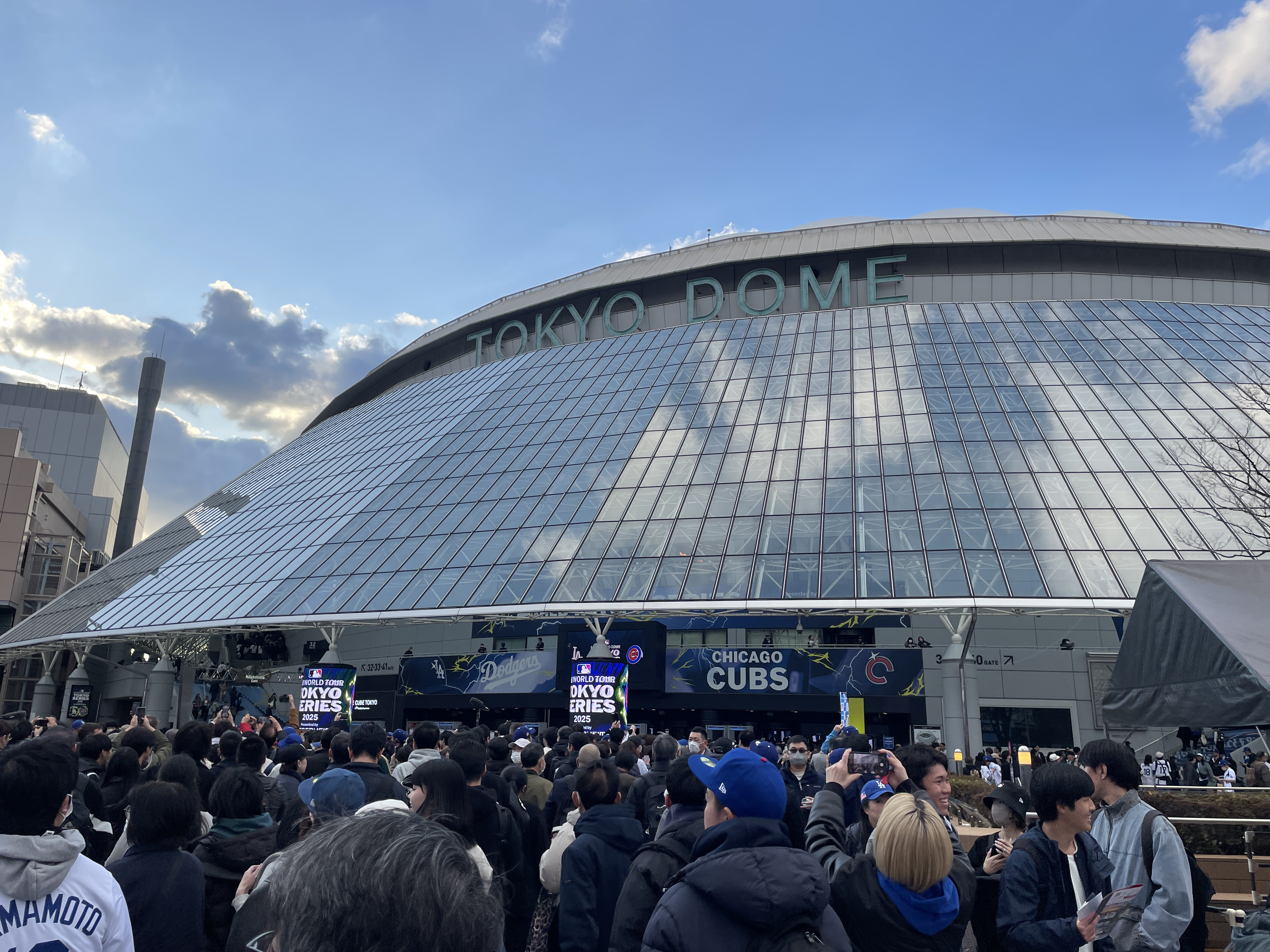
Fans arriving at Tokyo Dome for Game 1 of the series

The Tokyo Series games between the Dodgers and Cubs were broadcast nationally in the United States by Fox Sports in English and Fox Deportes in Spanish. Fox reportedly decided to have their announcers remain in the US and broadcast remotely due to other obligations such as the NCAA Division I men's basketball tournament. Nippon Television and Prime Video Japan held broadcast rights in Japan.

Date	Time	Matchup / Result	Attendance	Notes	Ref.
March 18, 2025	7:10 p.m. (JST)	Los Angeles Dodgers 4 Chicago Cubs 1	42,365	WP: Yamamoto, Save: Scott; LP: Brown, HR: none	
March 18, 2025	6:10 a.m. (EDT)	Los Angeles Dodgers 4 Chicago Cubs 1	42,365	WP: Yamamoto, Save: Scott; LP: Brown, HR: none	
March 19, 2025	7:10 p.m. (JST)	Los Angeles Dodgers 6 Chicago Cubs 3	42,367	WP: Knack, Save: Vesia; LP: Steele, HR: Edman, E. Hernández, Ohtani	
March 19, 2025	6:10 a.m. (EDT)	Los Angeles Dodgers 6 Chicago Cubs 3	42,367	WP: Knack, Save: Vesia; LP: Steele, HR: Edman, E. Hernández, Ohtani	

=== Notes ===
- This was the Dodgers' fourth overseas appearance and their first in Japan. The team previously played in 2014 in Sydney, Australia; in 2018 in Monterrey, Mexico; and 2024 in Seoul, South Korea.
- This was the Cubs' third overseas appearance and second in Japan. The Cubs previously played in Tokyo in 2000 and in London in 2023.
- This was the first Tokyo series to feature five Japanese players: Shohei Ohtani, Roki Sasaki, and Yoshinobu Yamamoto for the Dodgers and Shota Imanaga and Seiya Suzuki for the Cubs. Suzuki is from Arakawa, Tokyo, making Tokyo Dome his hometown stadium.
- Japanese musician Yoshiki performed the U.S. and Japanese national anthems at the Tokyo Series opening ceremony. For the second opening ceremony, Japanese girl group Little Glee Monster performed the U.S. and Japanese national anthems.

== Sponsors and partners ==
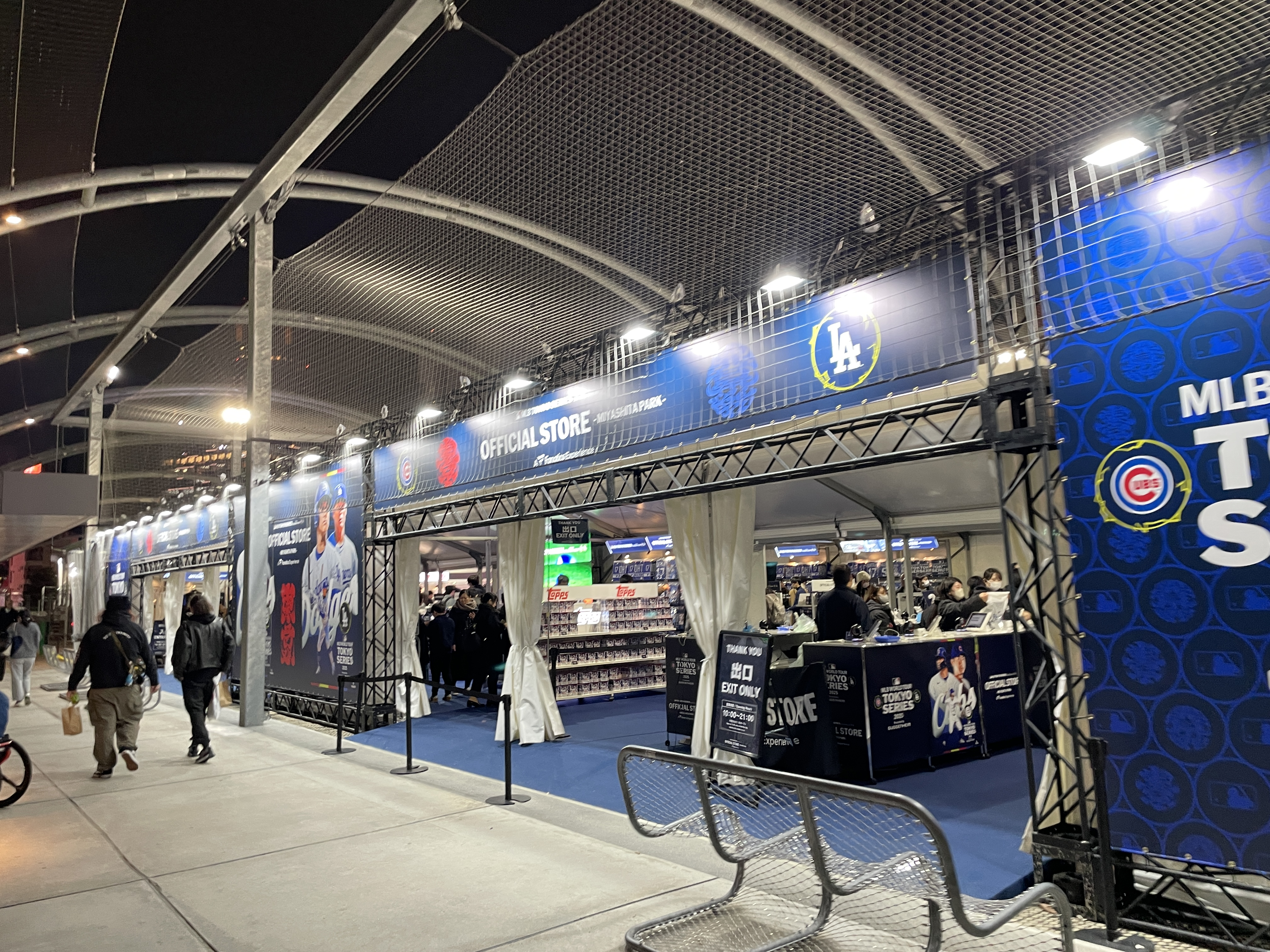
Official pop-up shop at Miyashita Park in the Shibuya section of Tokyo

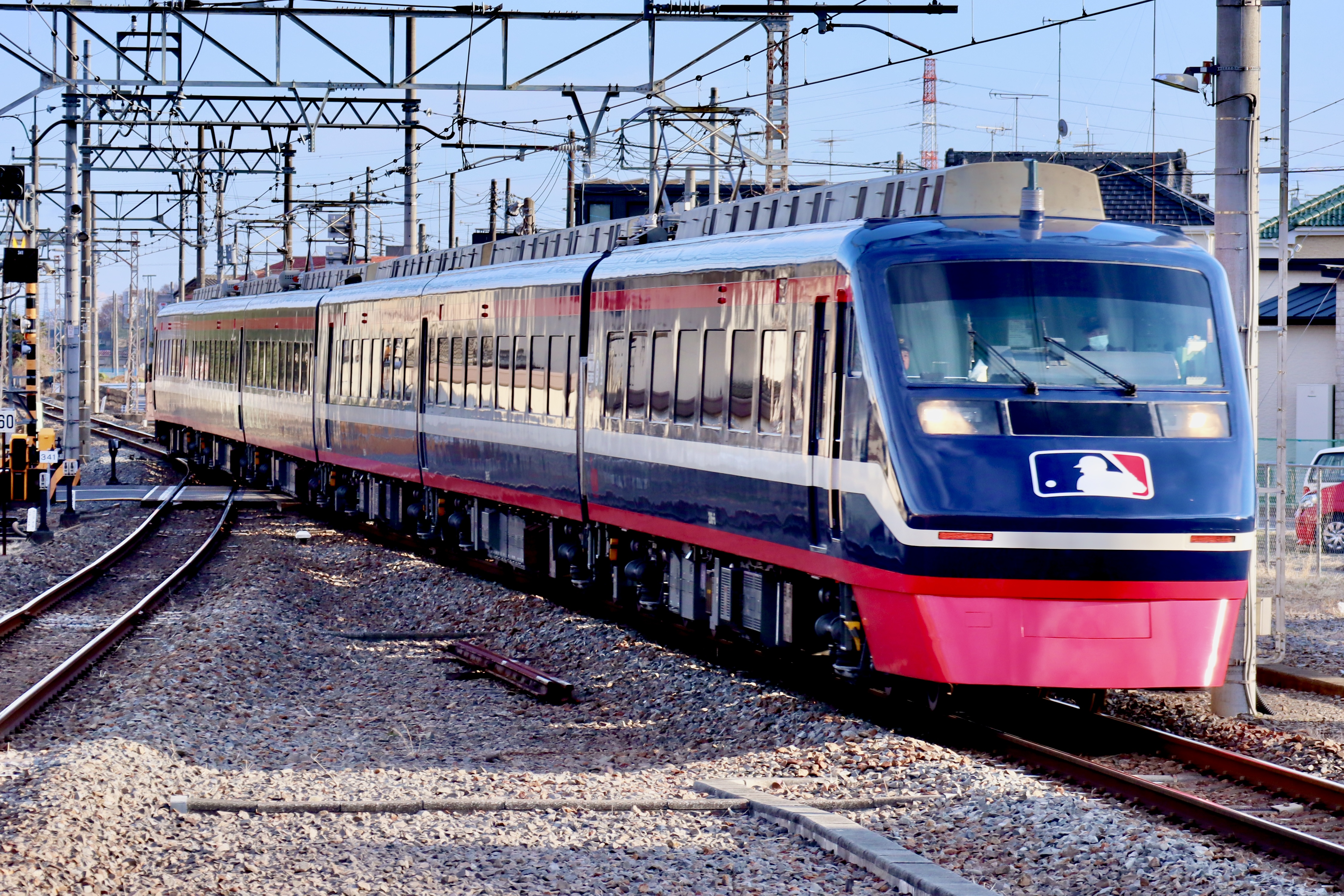
Tobu Railway Ryōmō Line with an MLB-themed livery and logo.

The presenting sponsor of the Tokyo Series was Guggenheim Partners. Guggenheim Partners is led by CEO Mark Walter, who also leads Guggenheim Baseball Management, the entity that owns the Dodgers. (Note: While Guggenheim Partners and Guggenheim Baseball Management are different entities, various sources refer to Guggenheim Partners, or simply "Guggenheim", as the owner of the Dodgers. See also List of Los Angeles Dodgers owners and executives.) The Dodgers, featuring Shohei Ohtani, are a popular team in Japan.

Japan Airlines was an official presenter of the series and a global partner of Major League Baseball. The airline has consistently supported Japanese players in MLB starting with Hideki Matsui in 2003 and now including Shohei Ohtani and Masataka Yoshida. Japan Travel Bureau was also an official partner.

Ito En, the Japanese drinks company that manufactures Ohtani's favorite drink (Oi Ocha, an unsweetened green tea), sponsored the series as part of its ongoing global partnership with Ohtani, the Dodgers, and MLB. Asahi Beer has a global partnership with MLB and its "Super Dry" lager was the official beer of the series.

The Yomiuri Shimbun, a Japanese newspaper, organized the series. MLB also had several collaborations, including with Demon Slayer: Kimetsu no Yaiba, a Japanese manga series, to produce a short anime film about the series. MLB collaborated with Takashi Murakami, a contemporary artist, to launch a limited-edition collection of merchandise released by Complex.

The Pokémon Company also collaborated with MLB. Prior to the first game, a video montage was played featuring "monsters" (notable historical players) of previous MLB games in Japan as well as Japanese players in MLB. Pikachu characters were on the field during player introductions.

Tobu Railway decorated a 200 series train, used for its Ryōmō limited express service, in MLB's colors (red, white, and blue) ahead of the series and for the remainder of the year.

== Reception ==
The Tokyo Series broke several records and became the largest standalone international event in Major League Baseball's history. The event averaged over 25 million viewers across platforms. Fanatics reported that it generated over $40 million in merchandise and trading card sales, a company record for a special event. Sales beat the prior record holder, the 2024 London Series, by 320%.

== See also ==
- List of Major League Baseball games played outside the United States and Canada
- MLB Japan All-Star Series
