= Ikumi Kai =

Japanese baseball player (born 2000)

Ikumi Kai 生海

Fukuoka SoftBank Hawks – No. 154
- Outfielder
- Born: July 11, 2000 (age 25); Kitakyushu, Fukuoka, Japan
- Bats: Right Throws: Right

NPB debut
- July 22, 2023, for the Fukuoka SoftBank Hawks

NPB statistics (through 2023 season)
- Batting average: .200
- Home runs: 0
- RBI: 0

Teams
- Fukuoka SoftBank Hawks (2023–present)

Career highlights and awards
- Japan Series champion (2025)

Ikumi Kai (甲斐 生海, Kai Ikumi; born July 11, 2000) also known as Ikumi (生海) is a Japanese professional baseball outfielder for the Fukuoka SoftBank Hawks of Nippon Professional Baseball (NPB).

== Early baseball career ==
Ikumi went on to Tohoku Fukushi University, and in the fall league game of his fourth year, he recorded 3 home runs and 16 RBIs, winning the double title for home runs and RBIs, and won the Best Nine Award as first basemen.

== Professional career ==
On October 20, 2022, Ikumi was drafted by the Fukuoka SoftBank Hawks in the third round in the 2022 Nippon Professional Baseball draft.

On July 22, 2023, Ikumi made his First League debut in the Pacific League against the Chiba Lotte Marines, and recorded his first hit.

In 2023 season, he appeared in 13 games in the Pacific League.
