= Kengo Yoshida =

Japanese baseball player (born 2001)

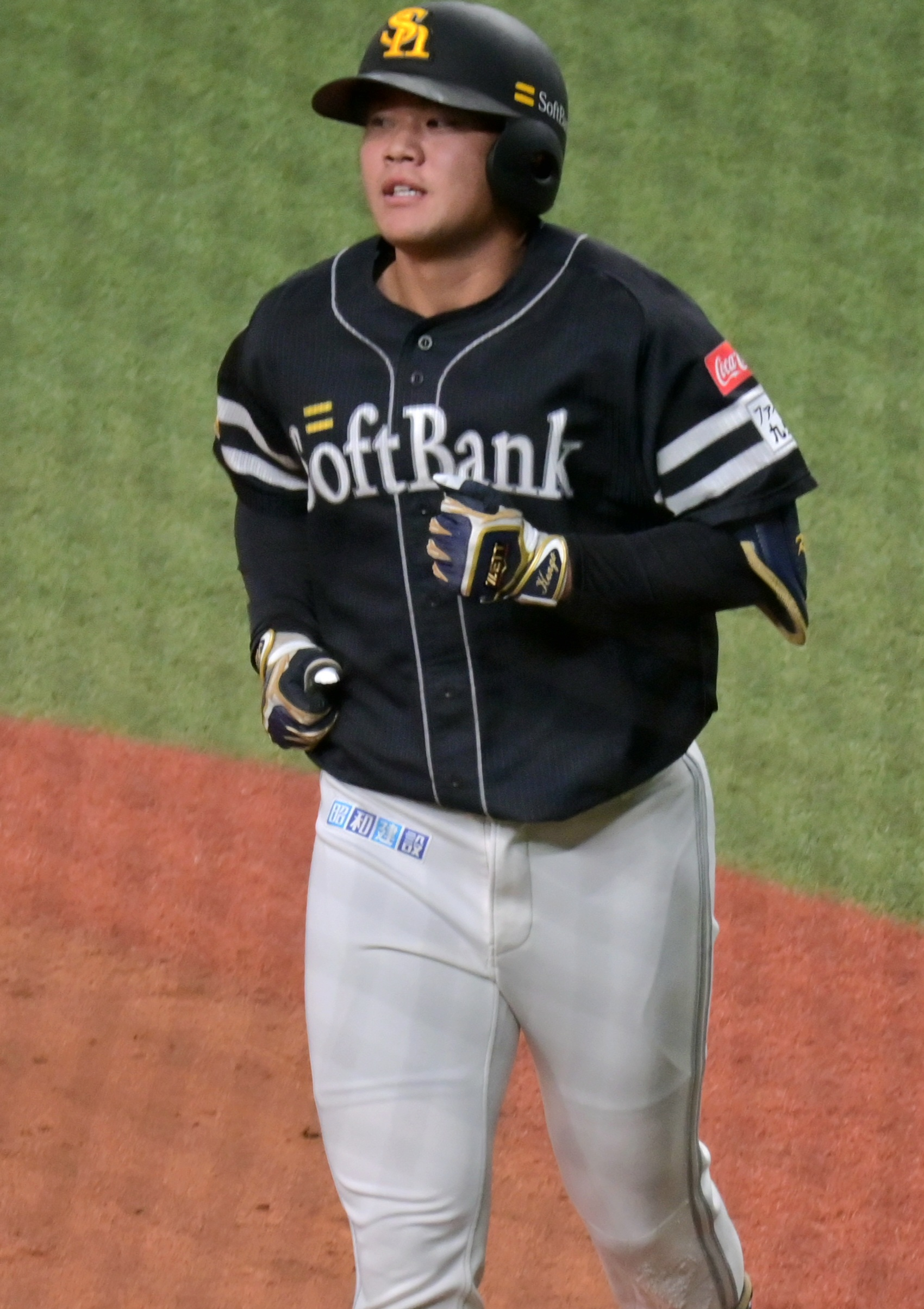
- Yoshida with the Fukuoka SoftBank Hawks

Hokkaido Nippon-Ham Fighters – No. 60
- Catcher
- Born: January 18, 2001 (age 24); Yokohama, Kanagawa, Japan
- Bats: Right Throws: Right

NPB debut
- October 1, 2023, for the Fukuoka SoftBank Hawks

NPB statistics (through 2024 season)
- Batting average: .185
- Home runs: 0
- RBI: 2
- Hits: 5
- Stolen base: 0
- Sacrifice bunt: 0

Teams
- Fukuoka SoftBank Hawks (2023–2024); Hokkaido Nippon-Ham Fighters (2025–present)

Kengo Yoshida (吉田 賢吾, Yoshida Kengo; born January 18, 2001) is a Japanese professional baseball Catcher for the Hokkaido Nippon-Ham Fighters of Nippon Professional Baseball (NPB).

== Early baseball career ==
Yoshida entered Toin University of Yokohama, where he won the spring Kanagawa University Baseball League in his third year and was named the league's MVP and the Best Nine Award. He also played an active role in the fall league, winning the league's MVP and Best Nine awards for two consecutive leagues.

During his college career, Yoshida had a batting average of .404 and 15 home runs, and was named MVP twice, the Best Nine Award four times, the RBI Leader three times, and the Hitting Leader once in the Kanagawa University Baseball League.

== Professional career ==
On October 20, 2022, Yoshida was drafted by the Fukuoka SoftBank Hawks in the 6th round in the 2022 Nippon Professional Baseball draft.

In 2023 season, Yoshida was delayed due to rehabilitation of his right elbow, but appeared in 32 games in the Western League, batting .310 with 2 home runs and 15 RBIs, and was added to the First League roster on September 30. On October 1, Yoshida made his First League debut in the Pacific League against the Fukuoka SoftBank Hawks as a pinch hitter. That was his only appearance in the Pacific League in the 2023 season.
