= Tokumasa Chano =

Japanese baseball player (born 1999)

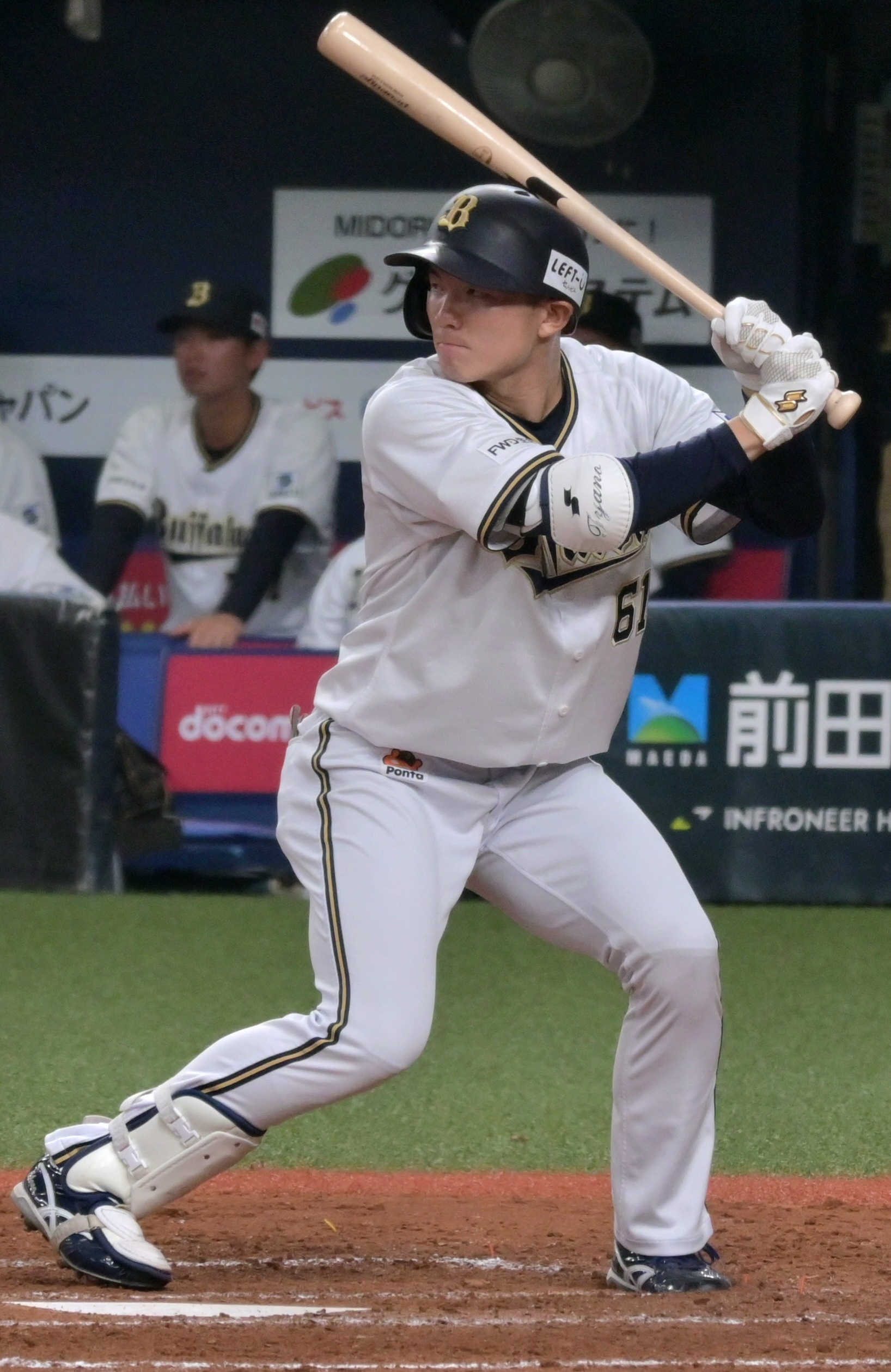
- Chano with the Orix Buffaloes.

Saitama Seibu Lions – No. 31
- Outfielder
- Born: August 4, 1999 (age 27); Yōkaichi, Shiga Prefecture, Japan
- Bats: Left Throws: Right

NPB debut
- March 31, 2023, for the Orix Buffaloes

NPB statistics (through 2025 season)
- Batting average: .239
- Home runs: 1
- Runs batted in: 29

Teams
- Orix Buffaloes (2023–2025); Saitama Seibu Lions (2026–present)

Tokumasa Chano (茶野 篤政, Chano Tokumasa; born August 4, 1999) is a Japanese professional baseball player. He plays outfielder for the Saitama Seibu Lions of Nippon Professional Baseball (NPB).

== Career ==
=== Orix Buffaloes ===
On October 20, 2022, Chano was selected by the Orix Buffaloes with their 4th developmental player pick of the 2022 NPB draft.

After a strong spring training performance, Chano was promoted to the first team on March 24, 2023, and selected as the Buffaloes' starting right-fielder on Opening Day against the Saitama Seibu Lions. Chano singled in his first professional at-bat against Kona Takahashi, and went on to steal 2nd base. Chano had a 14-game hitting streak, which started on April 28. His first NPB home run was a grand slam off Kazuki Yabuta of the Hiroshima Toyo Carp on June 1.

=== Saitama Seibu Lions ===
On December 9, 2025, Chano was selected by the Saitama Seibu Lions in the Active Player Draft.
