= Kojiro Yoshimura =

Japanese baseball player (born 1998)

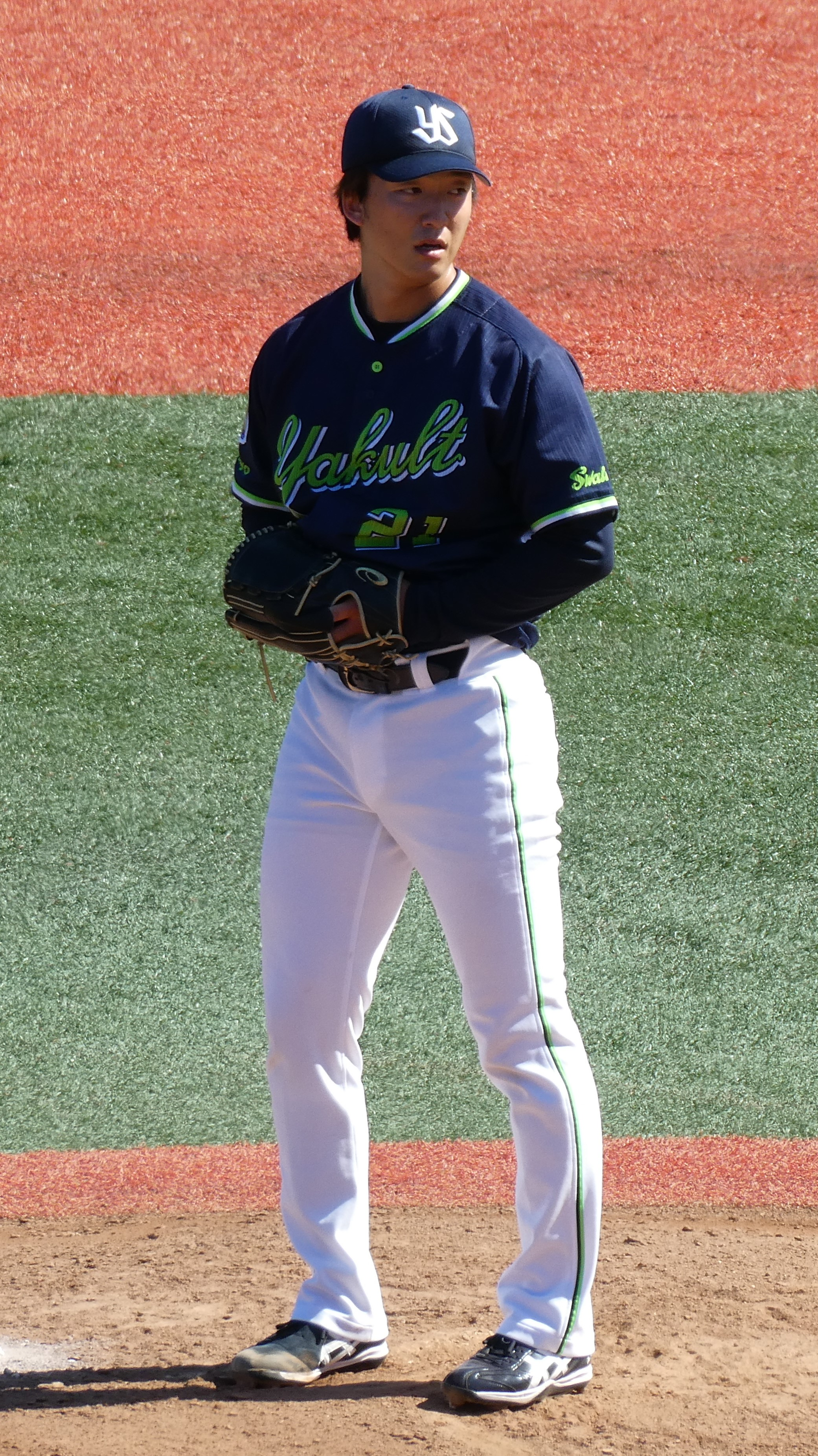
- Yoshimura with the Tokyo Yakult Swallows

Tokyo Yakult Swallows – No. 21
- Pitcher
- Born: January 19, 1998 (age 28); Adachi, Tokyo, Japan
- Bats: Right Throws: Right

NPB debut
- April 2, 2023, for the Tokyo Yakult Swallows

Career statistics (through 2023 season)
- Win–loss record: 4-2
- Earned Run Average: 4.33
- Strikeouts: 46
- Stats at Baseball Reference

Teams
- Tokyo Yakult Swallows (2023–present)

Career highlights and awards
- NPB All-Star (2024)

Kojiro Yoshimura (吉村 貢司郎, Yoshimura Kōjirō; born January 19, 1998 in Adachi, Tokyo, Japan) is a Japanese professional baseball pitcher for the Tokyo Yakult Swallows of Nippon Professional Baseball (NPB).
