= Reia Nakachi =

Japanese baseball player (born 2001)

Reia Nakachi 仲地礼亜
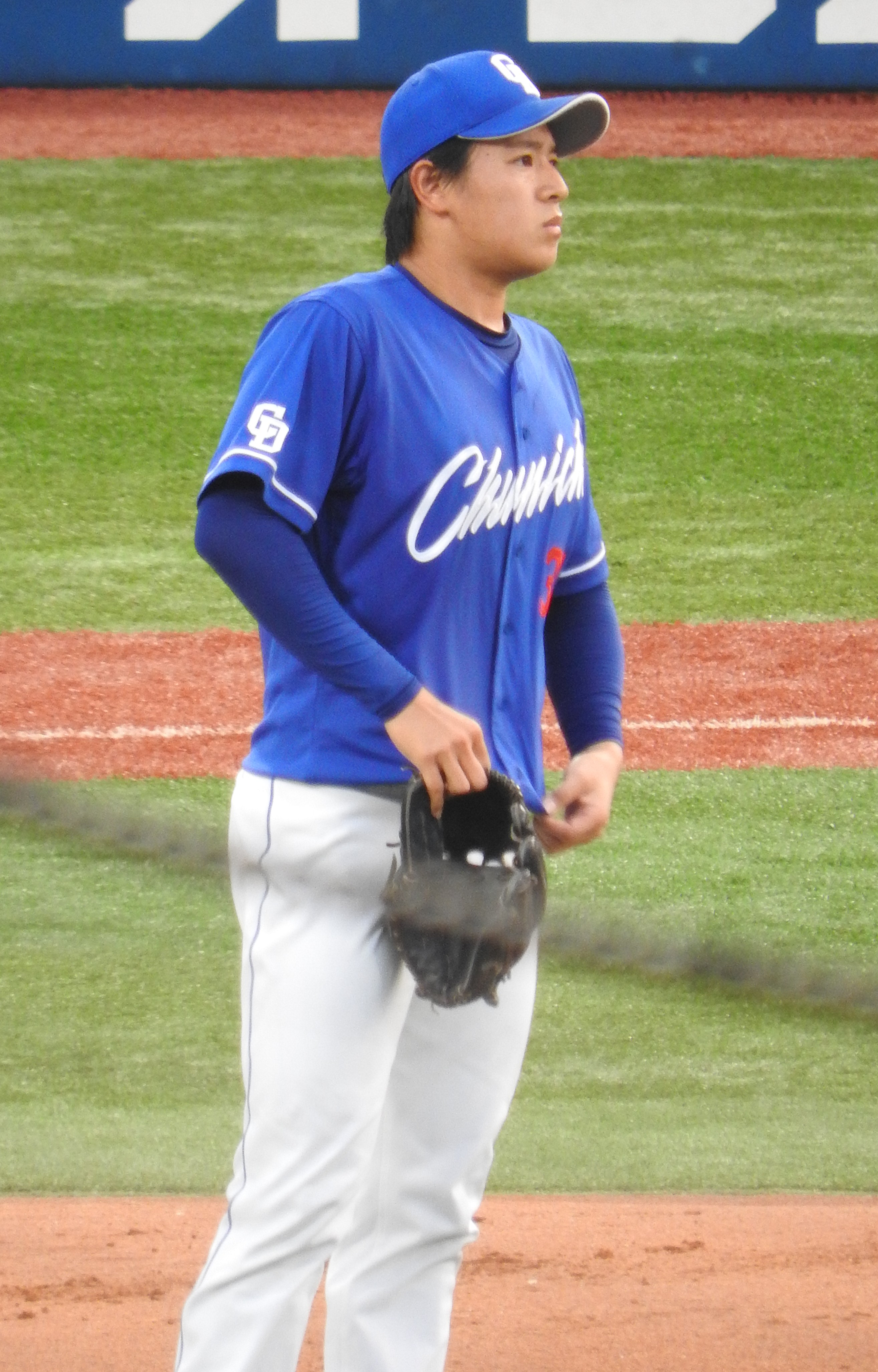

Chunichi Dragons – No. 26
- Pitcher
- Born: February 15, 2001 (age 25); Yomitan, Okinawa, Japan
- Bats: Right Throws: Right

NPB debut
- 13 May 2023, for the Chunichi Dragons

NPB statistics (through May 10, 2026)
- Win–loss record: 2-5
- Earned run average: 5.50
- Strikeouts: 48

Teams
- Chunichi Dragons (2023–present)

Reia Nakachi (仲地礼亜, Nakachi Reia; born February 15, 2001) is a professional Japanese baseball player. He plays pitcher for the Chunichi Dragons.

== Early career ==
Nakachi started playing baseball while at Yomitan Village Furugen Elementary School, and while at Yomitan Village Furugen Middle School, he started playing with Chatan Boys. Chasing after his 2-year senior brother, Kuore, Nakachi entered Okinawa Prefectural Kadena Senior High School. In summer of his first year, his team made it to the Japanese High School Baseball Championship with his brother as the team's ace, but Nakachi hadn't even made the bench. From his second year however, Nakachi would perform as the team's ace but unfortunately was unable to emulate his brother's experience at Koshien, going as far as the semi-finals of the Okinawan Prefectural tournament where he lost out to Kōnan High School's, Hiroya Miyagi.

Nakachi would join Okinawa University, starting on the bench in his first year. In spring of his third year in the All Japan Baseball Championship, he would pitch 8 innings for one earned-run against Meijo University, collecting the interest of scouts.

On September 10, 2022, Nakachi submitted his expression of interest to become a professional baseball player. The Chunichi Dragons would late make public that they would be selecting Nakachi with their first-round pick, and on October 19, the Dragons would make well on the word selecting Nakachi in the first round of the 2022 Nippon Professional Baseball draft. Upon selection, he became the first Okinawa University alumni to be selected in the draft. On 7 November, Nakachi signed a contract worth ¥16,000,000 per year with a sign-on bonus of ¥100,000,000 and ¥50,000,000 in incentives.

== Professional career ==
=== Chunichi Dragons ===
==== 2023 ====
Nakachi started spring training with the second team, however he would later join up with the first team in the latter half. He appeared in some pre-season games. On 13 May, Nakachi made his first-team debut as a starter against the Tokyo Yakult Swallows, however after giving up a 2-run homer to Munetaka Murakami in the first inning, he was replaced in the second inning by a pinch-hitter leaving the game as the losing pitcher. On July 26, Nakachi would record his first win with 6 scoreless innings against the Yokohama DeNA Baystars. He would appear in 9 games in total, going 2–5 with a 4.98 ERA and 37 strieouts. In the offseason, his contract would be downgraded by ¥1,000,000, re-signing at ¥15,000,000 for 2024. In late November, Nakachi would join the NPB WHITE team for the Asia Winter Baseball League in Taiwan.

== Pitching style ==
Nakachi tops out at 152 km/h while equipped with a change-up, curveball, cutter, slider, two-seamer and a split-finger fastball.

== Personal ==
Nakachi says he aims to be a pitcher like fellow Okinawans, Nao Higashihama and Sōhachi Aniya.
