= Taiki Narama =

Japanese baseball player (born 2000)

Taiki Narama 奈良間 大己
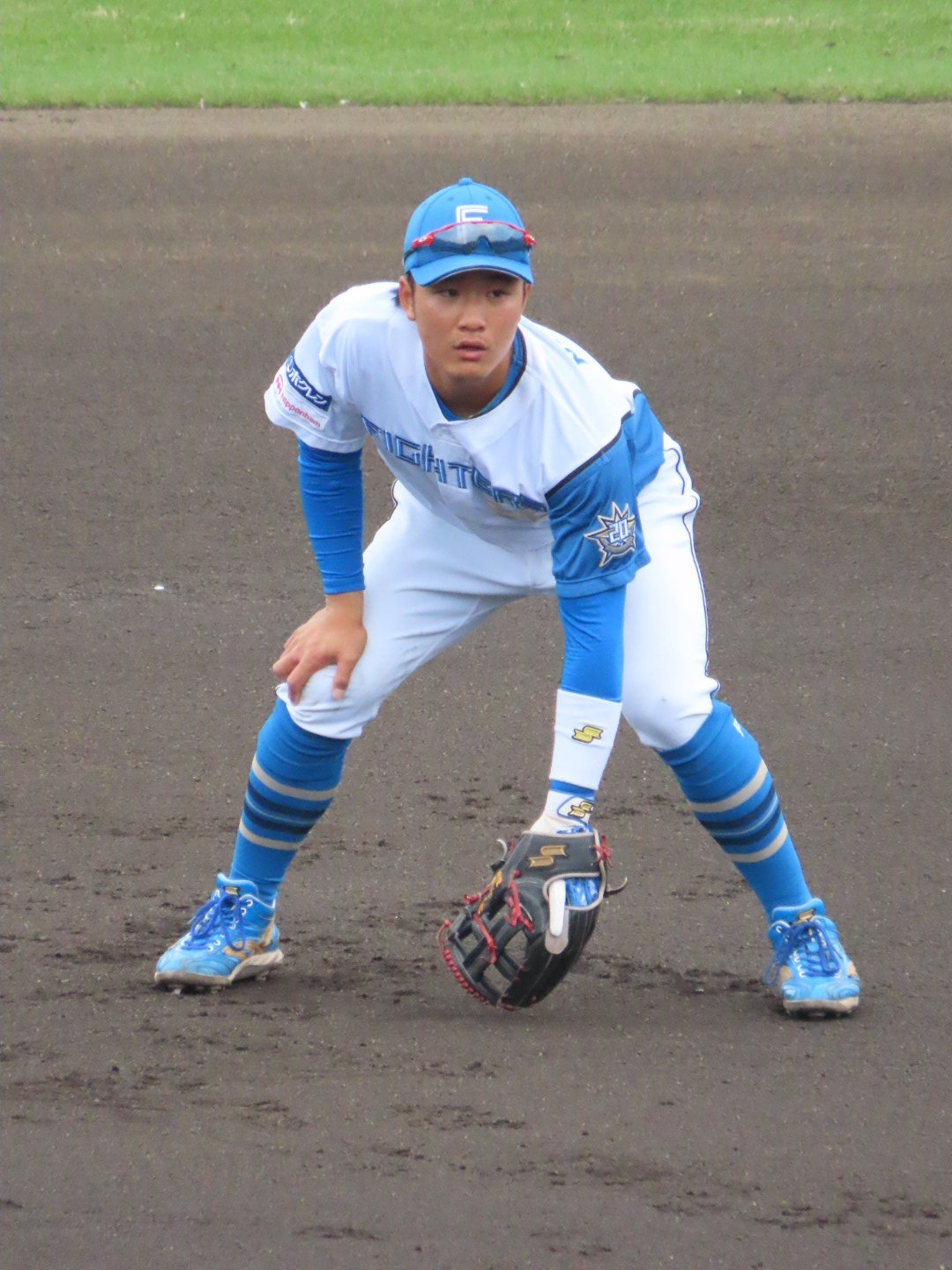

Hokkaido Nippon-Ham Fighters – No. 58
- Infielder
- Born: May 8, 2000 (age 25); Kikugawa, Shizuoka, Japan
- Bats: Right Throws: Right

NPB debut
- April 11, 2023, for the Hokkaido Nippon-Ham Fighters

Career statistics (through 2024 season)
- Batting average: .216
- Home runs: 2
- RBI: 22
- Hits: 69
- Stolen bases: 4

Teams
- Hokkaido Nippon-Ham Fighters (2023–present)

Taiki Narama (奈良間 大己, Narama Taiki; born May 8, 2000 in Kikugawa, Shizuoka, Japan) is a Japanese professional baseball infielder for the Hokkaido Nippon-Ham Fighters of Nippon Professional Baseball (NPB).
