= Keigo Kitamura =

Japanese baseball player (born 2000)

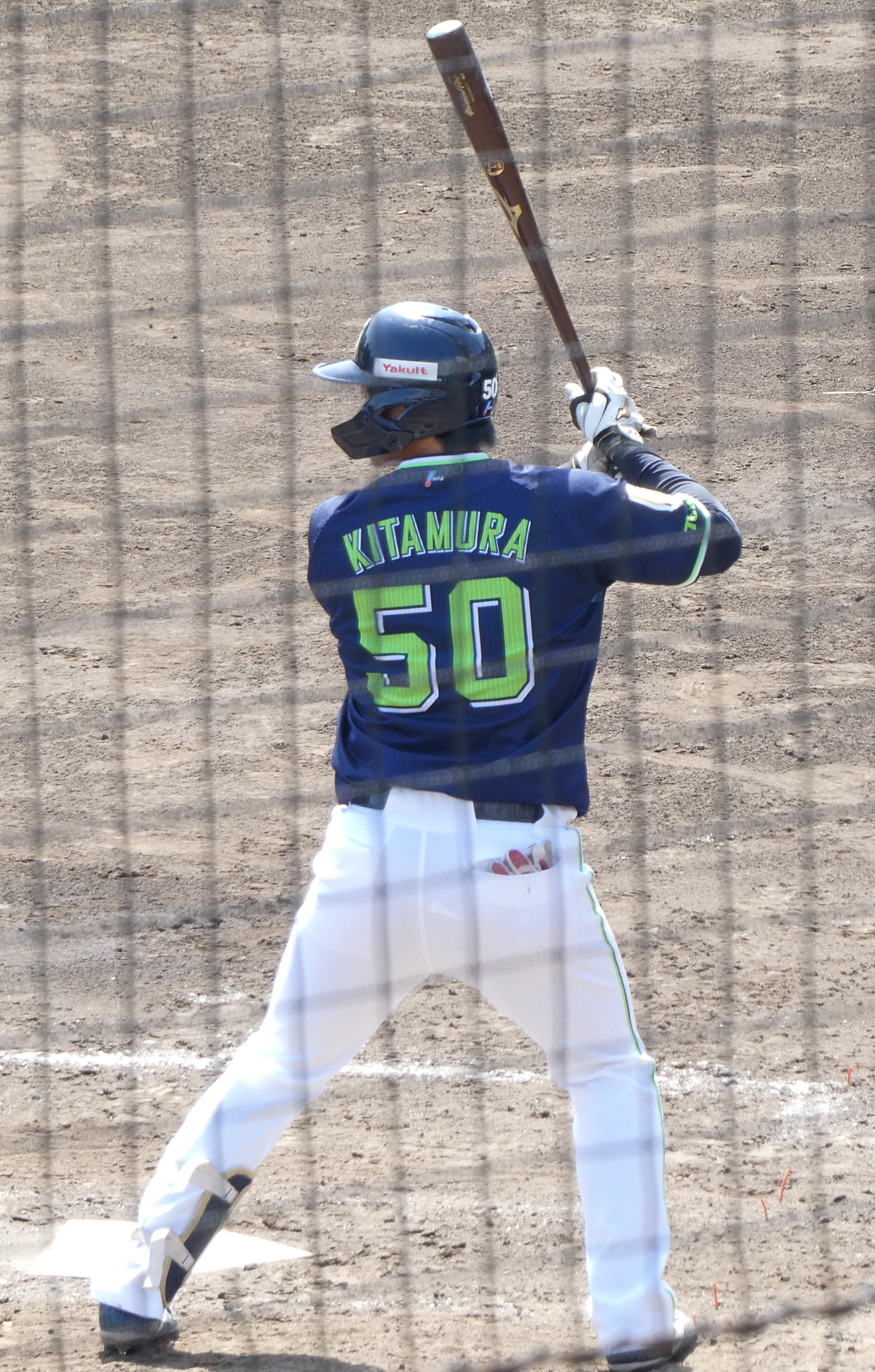

Tokyo Yakult Swallows – No. 50
- Infielder
- Born: December 18, 2000 (age 25); Ōgaki, Gifu, Japan
- Bats: Right Throws: Right

NPB debut
- May 6, 2023, for the Tokyo Yakult Swallows

Career statistics (through 2023 season)
- Batting average: .190
- Hits: 4
- Home runs: 1
- RBIs: 7
- Stolen bases: 0
- Stats at Baseball Reference

Teams
- Tokyo Yakult Swallows (2023–present)

Keigo Kitamura (北村 恵吾, Kitamura Keigo; born December 18, 2000 in Ōgaki, Gifu, Japan) is a professional Japanese baseball player. He plays the infield for the Tokyo Yakult Swallows.
