= Shōta Morishita =

Japanese baseball player (born 2000)

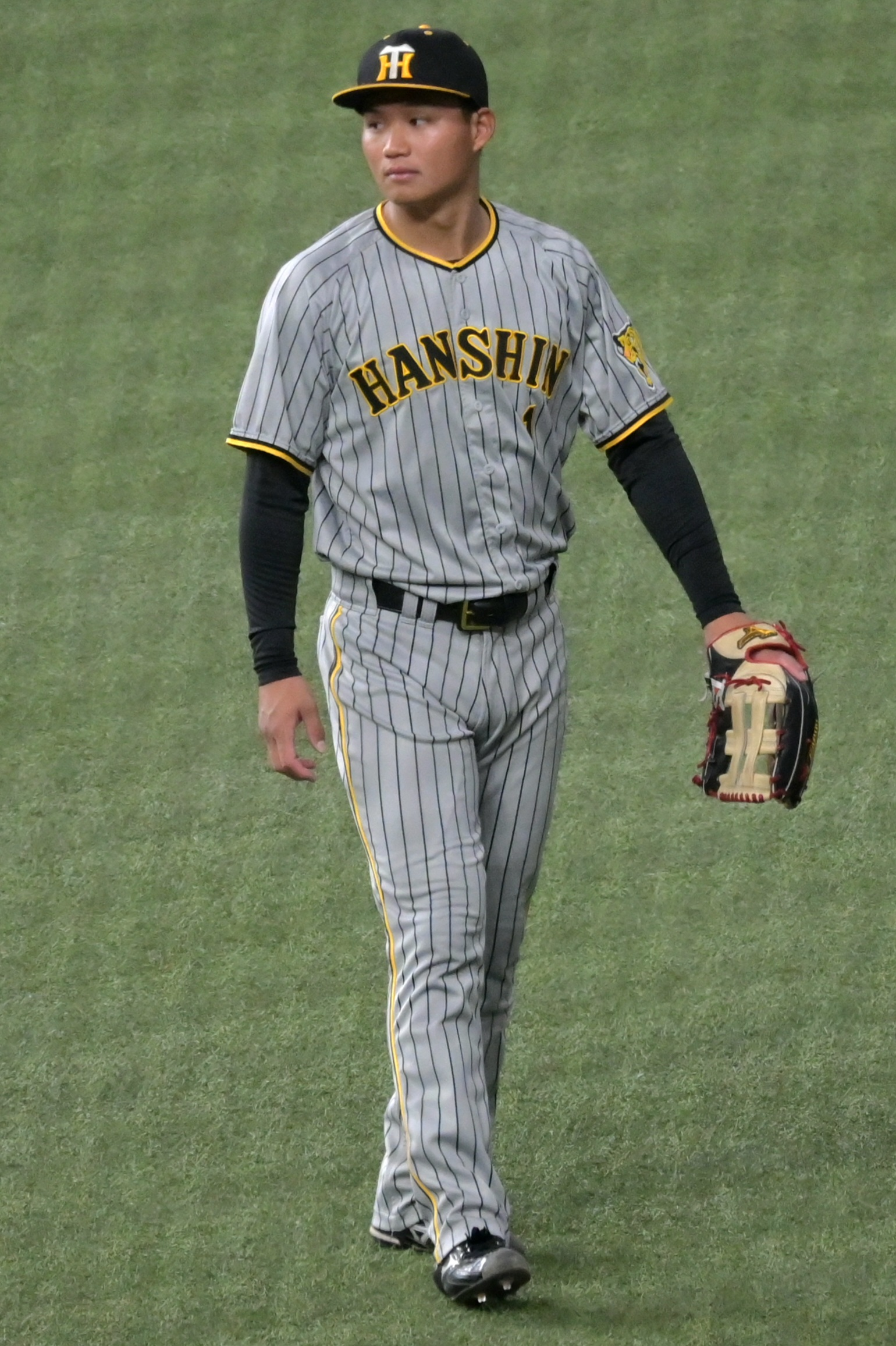

Hanshin Tigers – No. 1
- Outfielder
- Born: August 14, 2000 (age 26); Yokohama, Kanagawa, Japan
- Bats: Right Throws: Right

NPB debut
- March 31, 2023, for the Hanshin Tigers

NPB statistics (through 2025 season)
- Batting average: .266
- Home runs: 49
- Runs batted in: 203
- Stats at Baseball Reference

Teams
- Hanshin Tigers (2023–present)

Career highlights and awards
- Japan Series champion (2023); NPB All-Star (2025)
Medals
Men's baseball
Representing Japan
WBSC Premier12
Silver medal – second place	2024 Tokyo	Team

Shōta Morishita (森下 翔太, Morishita Shōta; born August 14, 2000) is a Japanese professional baseball outfielder for the Hanshin Tigers of Nippon Professional Baseball (NPB).

== Amateur career ==
Born in Yokohama City, Shōta played little league baseball in as early as first grade for the Nobahigiri Phoenix, playing mostly as an outfielder but he switched to third base when he entered Higiriyama Junior High. He continued to play baseball for Tokai Sagami High where he secured the cleanup position and center field right from the start, and even got to participate in the Spring Koshien tournaments of 2018. He hit a total of 57 home runs in all his official appearances in high school.

Despite gaining interest from some NPB teams, he did not submit an application for the 2018 NPB draft and instead opted to enroll in Chuo University in Tokyo to study finance. He still manned the outfield and was a regular in the lineup as his school participated regularly in the Tohto University Baseball League games. He got awarded best 9 in the 2019 spring season, and also got selected to play for the national team (Samurai Japan) to play in the Japan-US College Baseball Championships. He recorded a total of 36 RBIs including 9 home runs, .240 batting average and .412 slugging percentage in 78 Tohto League appearances, and got awarded best nine twice.

== Professional career ==
Morishita was chosen as the Hanshin Tigers' alternative pick during the 1st round of the 2022 Nippon Professional Baseball draft (after they lost the lottery draw for Shogo Asano to the Yomiuri Giants). He signed a 100 million yen contract with the Tigers, plus 50 million yen signing bonus for an estimated 16 million yen annual salary. He was assigned the jersey number 1.
