= Kota Yazawa =

Japanese baseball player (born 2000)

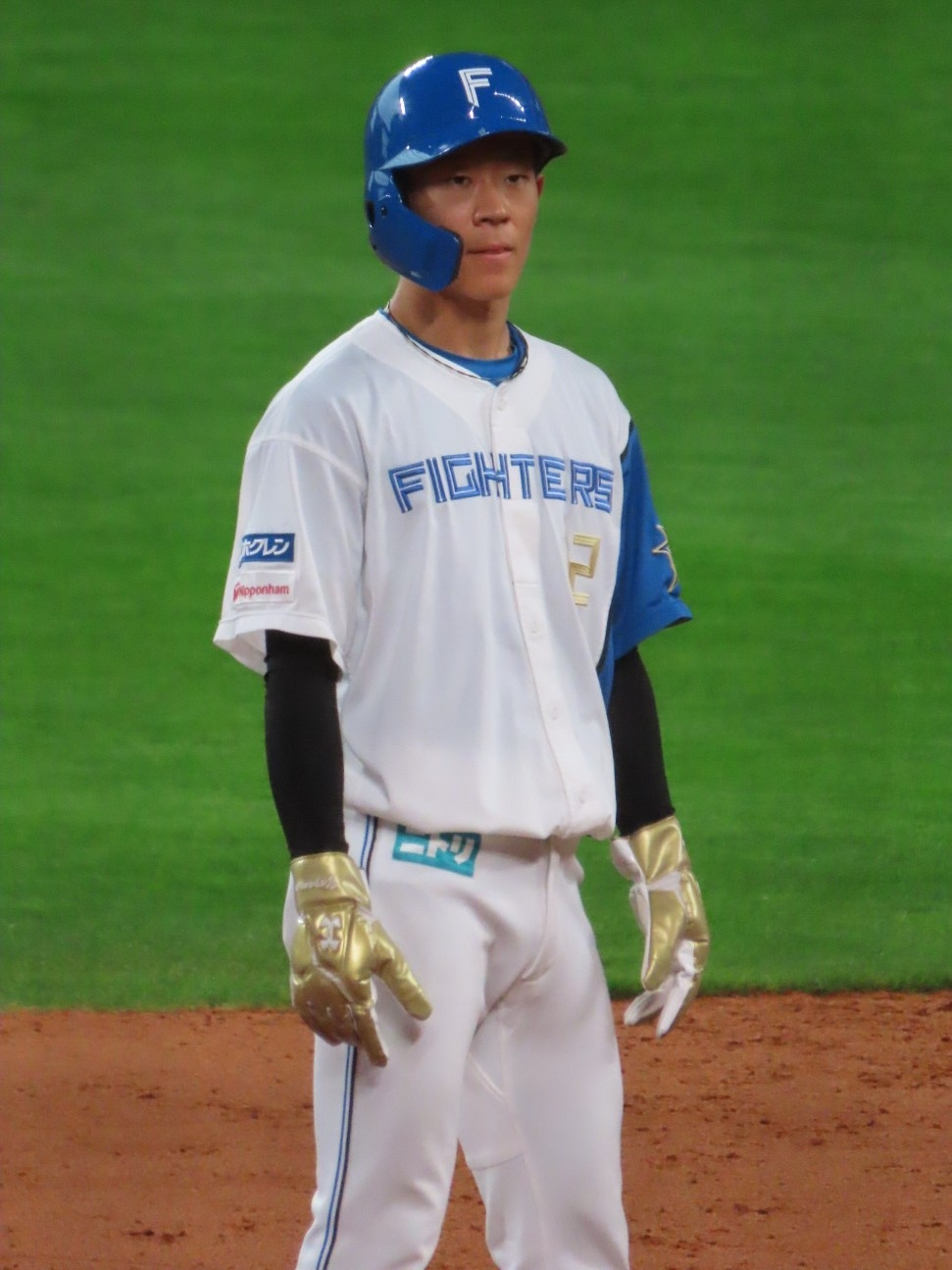
- Yazawa with the Hokkaido Nippon-Ham Fighters

Hokkaido Nippon-Ham Fighters – No. 12
- Pitcher / Outfielder
- Born: August 2, 2000 (age 26); Machida, Tokyo, Japan
- Bats: Left Throws: Left

NPB debut
- April 1, 2023, for the Hokkaido Nippon-Ham Fighters

NPB statistics (through 2025 season)
- Win–loss record: 1–2
- Earned run average: 3.52
- Strikeouts: 15
- Batting average: .214
- Home runs: 2
- Runs batted ins: 22

Teams
- Hokkaido Nippon-Ham Fighters (2023–present)

Kota Yazawa (矢澤 宏太, Yazawa Kota; born August 2, 2000) is a professional baseball player for the Hokkaido Nippon-Ham Fighters of Nippon Professional Baseball. He plays as a two-way player.
