= Ruito Nishimura =

Japanese baseball player (born 2004)

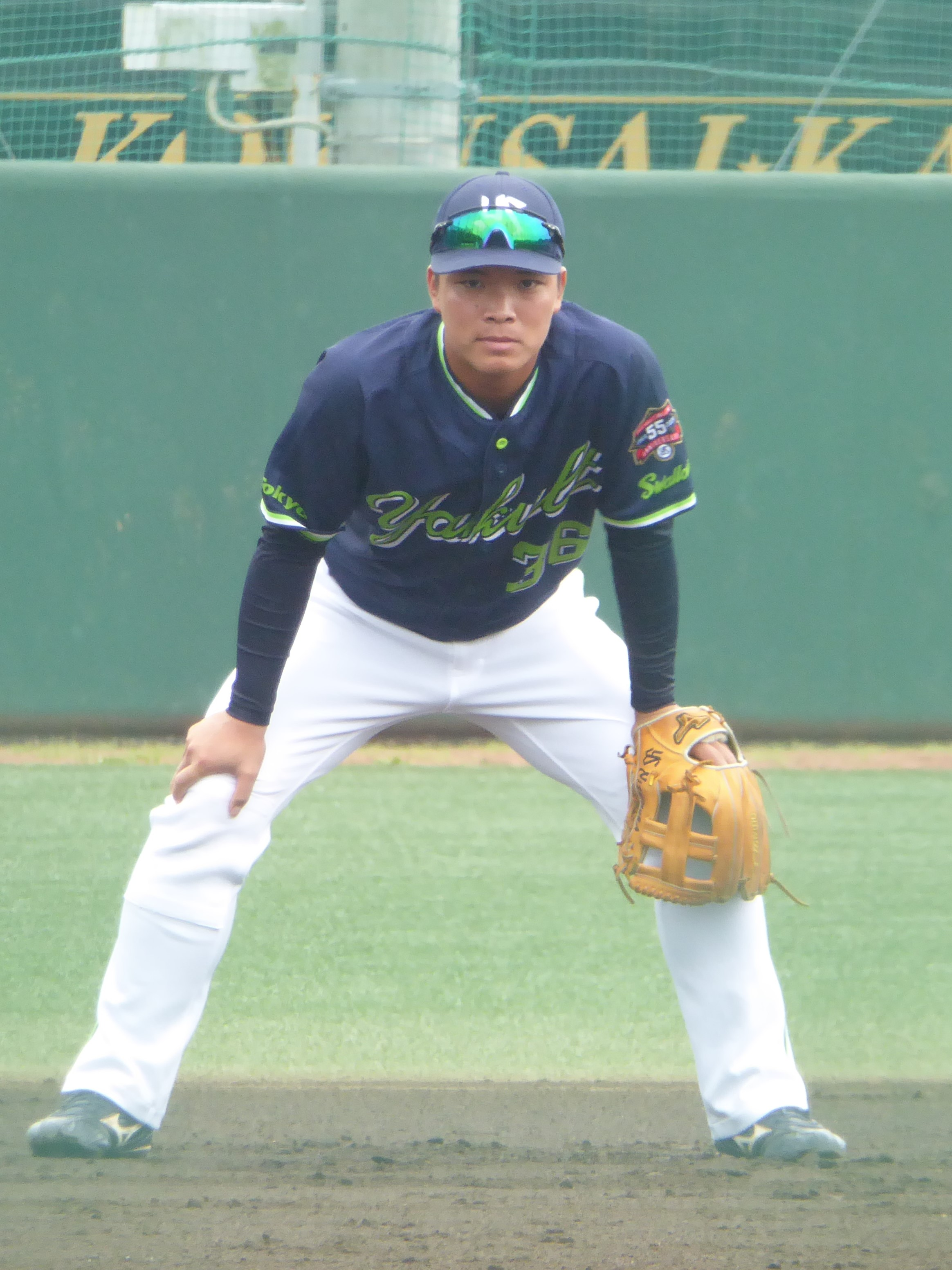

Tokyo Yakult Swallows – No. 36
- Outfielder
- Born: July 1, 2004 (age 22); Kyoto, Kyoto, Japan
- Bats: Left Throws: Right

NPB debut
- October 4, 2023, for the Tokyo Yakult Swallows

Career statistics (through 2025 season)
- Batting average: .083
- Hits: 1
- Home runs: 0
- RBI: 1

Teams
- Tokyo Yakult Swallows (2023–present)

Ruito Nishimura (西村 瑠伊斗, Nishimura Ruito; born July 1, 2004) is a Japanese professional baseball outfielder for the Tokyo Yakult Swallows of Nippon Professional Baseball (NPB).
