= Ren Sawai =

Japanese baseball player (born 2000)

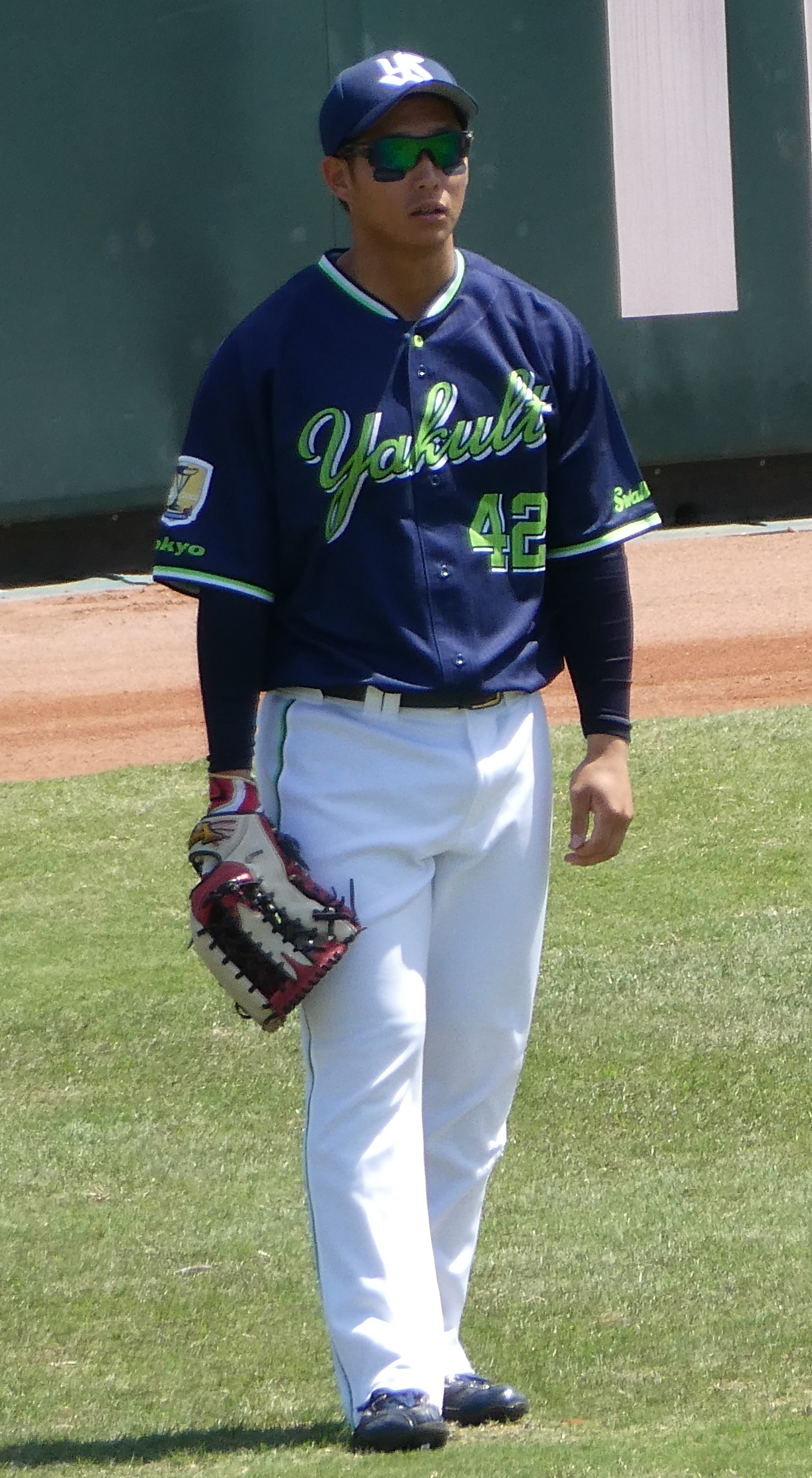

Tokyo Yakult Swallows – No. 42
- Outfielder
- Born: May 31, 2000 (age 25); Chita, Aichi, Japan
- Bats: Left Throws: Left

NPB debut
- May 6, 2023, for the Tokyo Yakult Swallows

Career statistics (through 2024 season)
- Batting average: .158
- Hits: 9
- Home runs: 1
- RBIs: 5
- Stolen bases: 0
- Stats at Baseball Reference

Teams
- Tokyo Yakult Swallows (2023–present)

Ren Sawai (澤井 廉, Sawai Ren; born May 31, 2000 in Chita, Aichi, Japan) is a professional Japanese baseball player. He plays outfielder for the Tokyo Yakult Swallows.
