= Takuya Hiruma =

Japanese baseball player (born 2000)

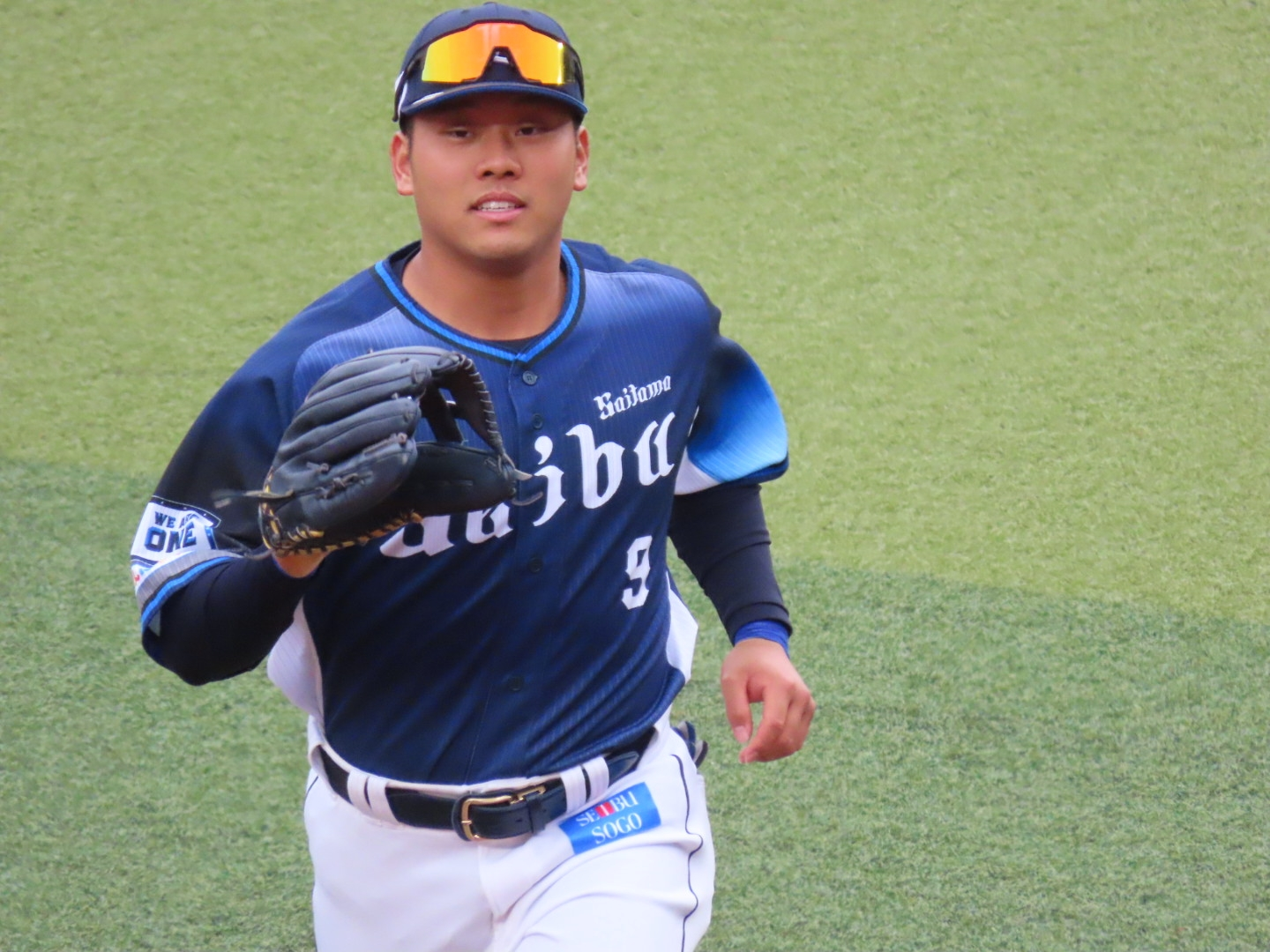

Saitama Seibu Lions – No. 9
- Outfielder
- Born: September 8, 2000 (age 26); Kiryū, Gunma, Japan
- Bats: Left Throws: Left

NPB debut
- June 23, 2023, for the Saitama Seibu Lions

NPB statistics (through 2023 season)
- Batting average: .232
- Hits: 46
- Home runs: 2
- Runs batted in: 20
- Stolen base: 0
- Stats at Baseball Reference

Teams
- Saitama Seibu Lions (2023–present)

Takuya Hiruma (蛭間 拓哉, Hiruma Takuya; born September 8, 2000) is a professional Japanese baseball player. He plays outfielder for the Saitama Seibu Lions.
