= Haruto Yamada =

Japanese baseball player (born 2004)

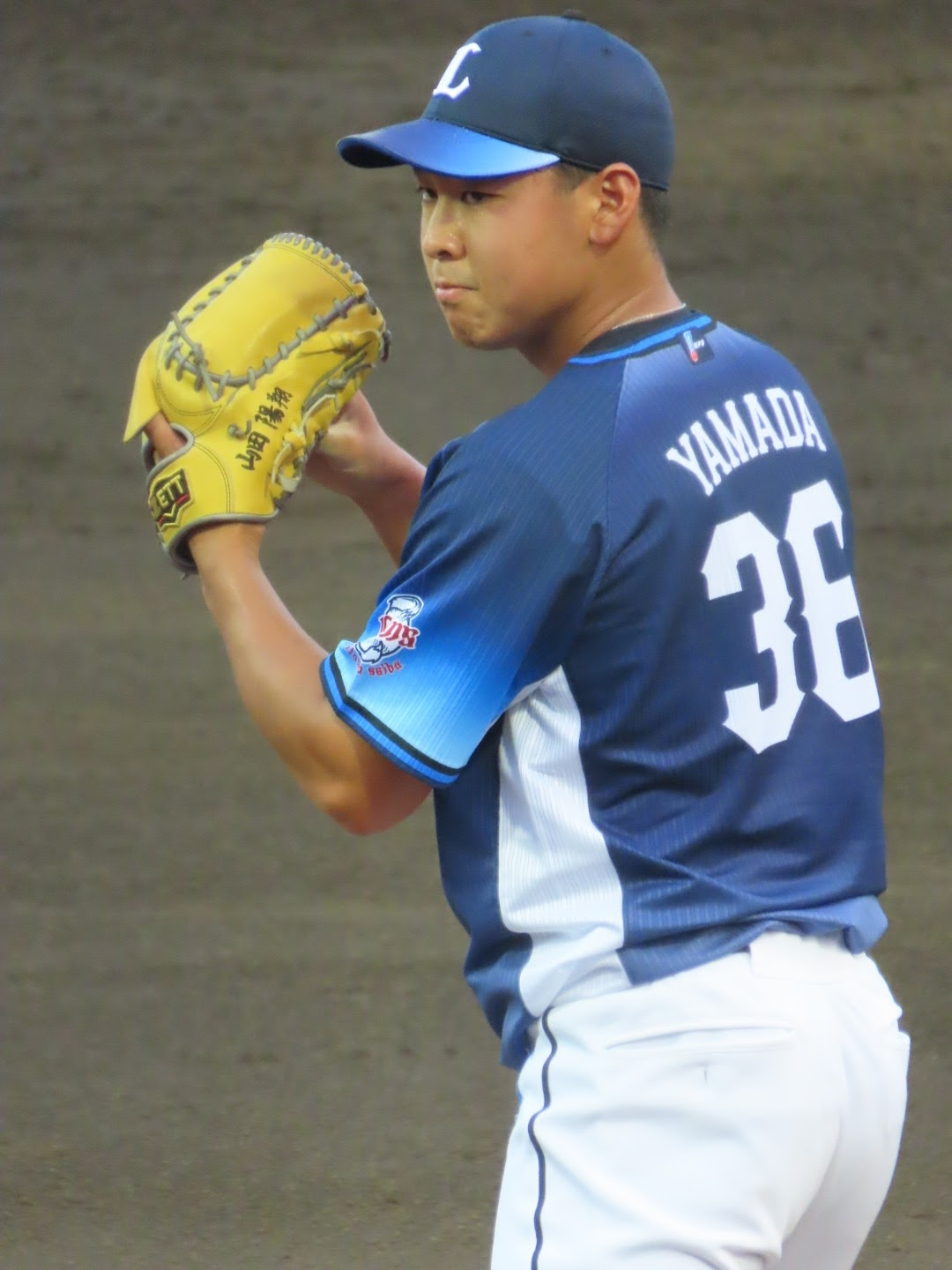

Saitama Seibu Lions – No. 36
- Pitcher
- Born: May 9, 2004 (age 22); Rittō, Shiga, Japan
- Bats: Right Throws: Right

NPB debut
- April 3, 2025, for the Saitama Seibu Lions

Career statistics (through 2025 season)
- Win–loss record: 3-3
- Earned run average: 2.08
- Strikeouts: 31
- Saves: 1
- Holds: 17

Teams
- Saitama Seibu Lions (2023–present)

Haruto Yamada (山田 陽翔, Yamada Haruto; born May 9, 2004) is a Japanese professional baseball pitcher for the Saitama Seibu Lions of Nippon Professional Baseball (NPB).
