= Masaya Hagio =

Japanese baseball player (born 2000)

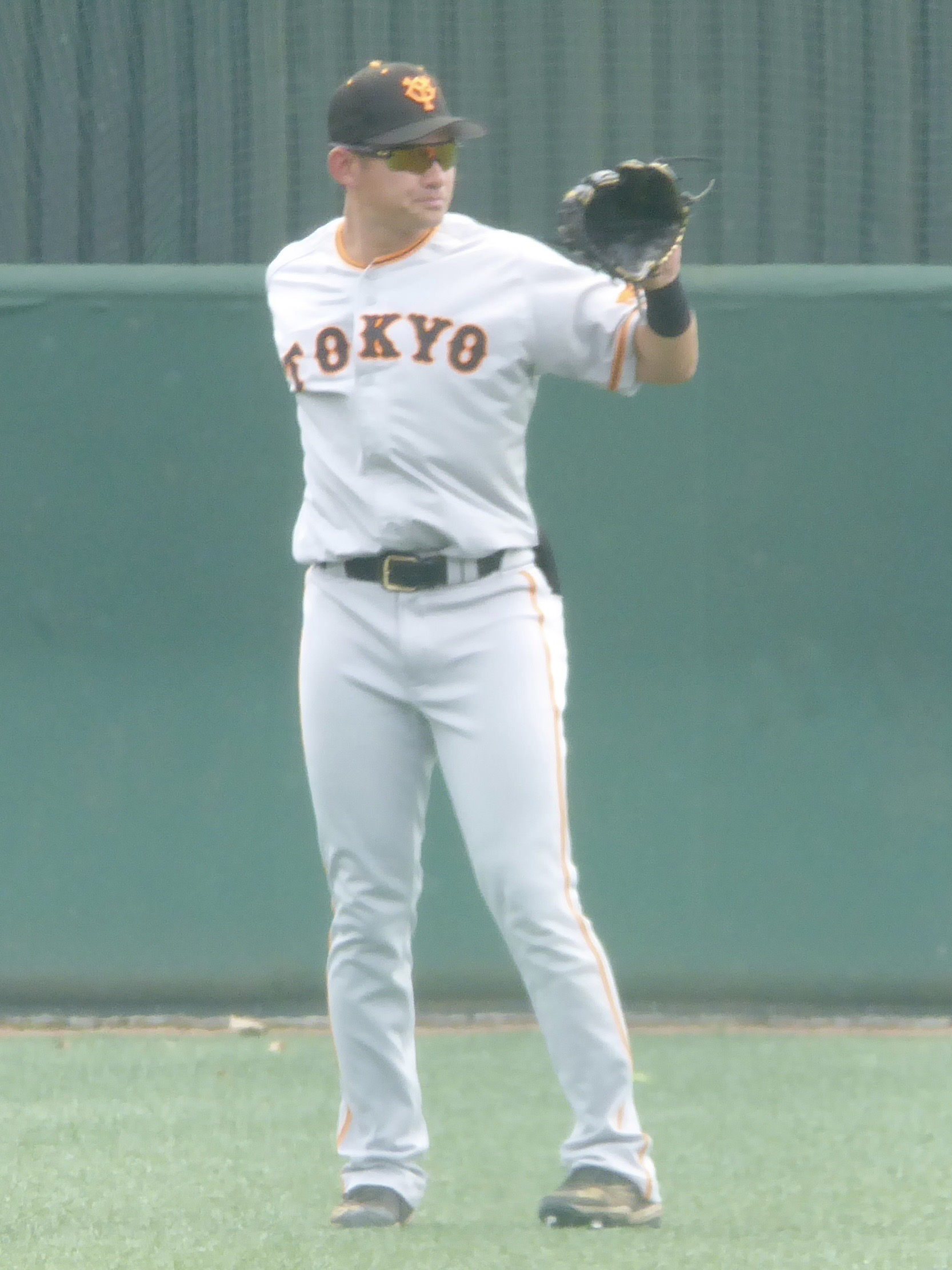

Yomiuri Giants – No. 12
- Outfielder
- Born: December 28, 2000 (age 25); Kikuchi District, Kumamoto, Japan
- Bats: Right Throws: Right

NPB debut
- May 28, 2023, for the Yomiuri Giants

NPB statistics (through 2023 season)
- Batting average: .063
- Home runs: 0
- RBI: 0
- Hits: 1
- Stolen base: 0
- Sacrifice bunt: 0
- Stats at Baseball Reference

Teams
- Yomiuri Giants (2023–present)

Masaya Hagio (萩尾 匡也, Hagio Masaya; born December 28, 2000 in Kikuchi, Kumamoto, Japan) is a professional Japanese baseball player. He plays outfielder for the Yomiuri Giants.
