= Ryōsuke Kodama =

Japanese baseball player (born 1998)

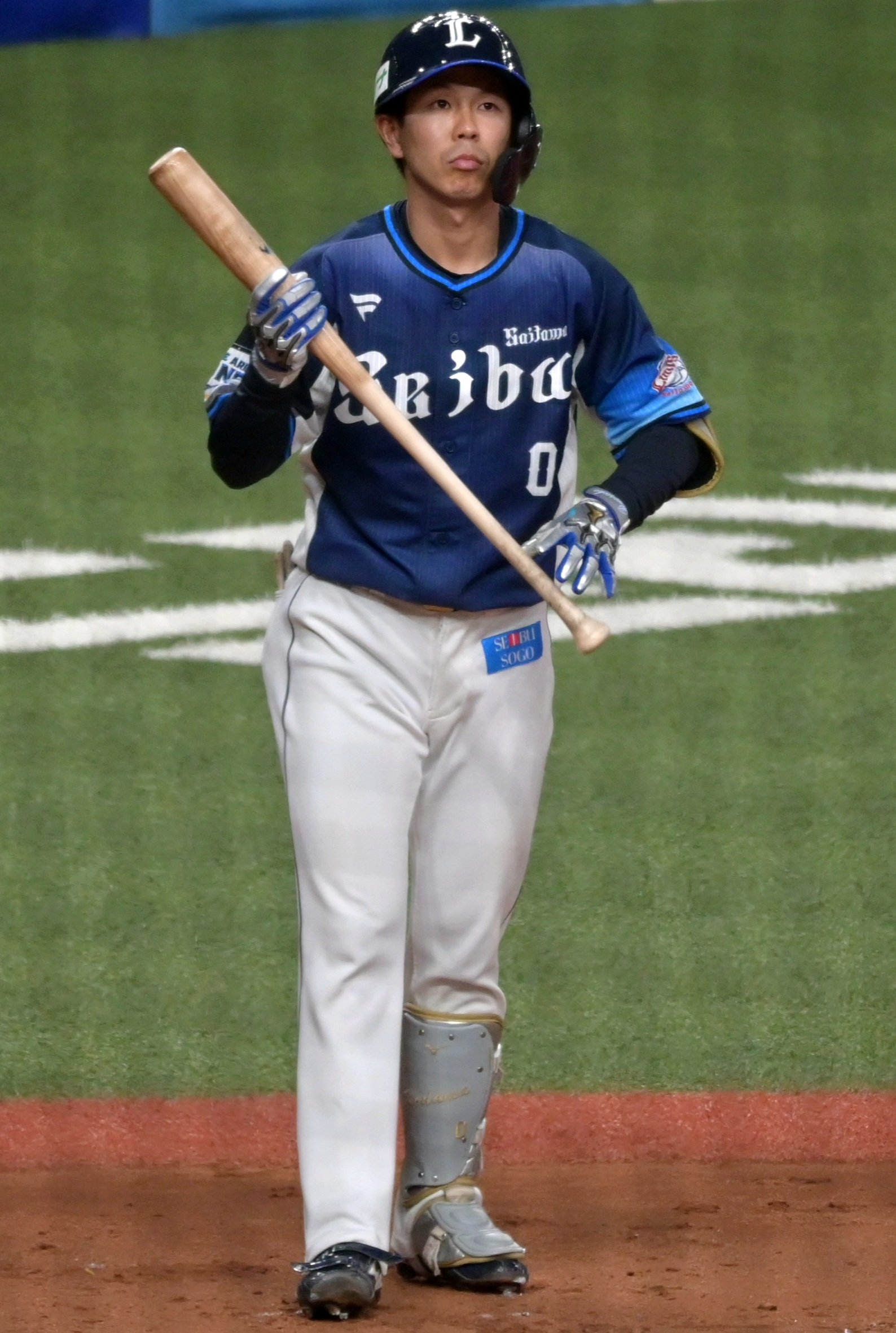

Saitama Seibu Lions – No. 0
- Infielder
- Born: July 10, 1998 (age 27); Tamana, Kumamoto, Japan
- Bats: Right Throws: Right

NPB debut
- March 31, 2023, for the Saitama Seibu Lions

NPB statistics (through 2023 season)
- Batting average: .221
- Hits: 27
- Home runs: 0
- Runs batted in: 8
- Stolen base: 2

Teams
- Saitama Seibu Lions (2023–present)

Ryōsuke Kodama (児玉 亮涼, Kodama Ryōsuke; born July 10, 1998) is a professional Japanese baseball player. He plays infielder for the Saitama Seibu Lions.
