= Keito Mombetsu =

Japanese baseball player (born 2004)

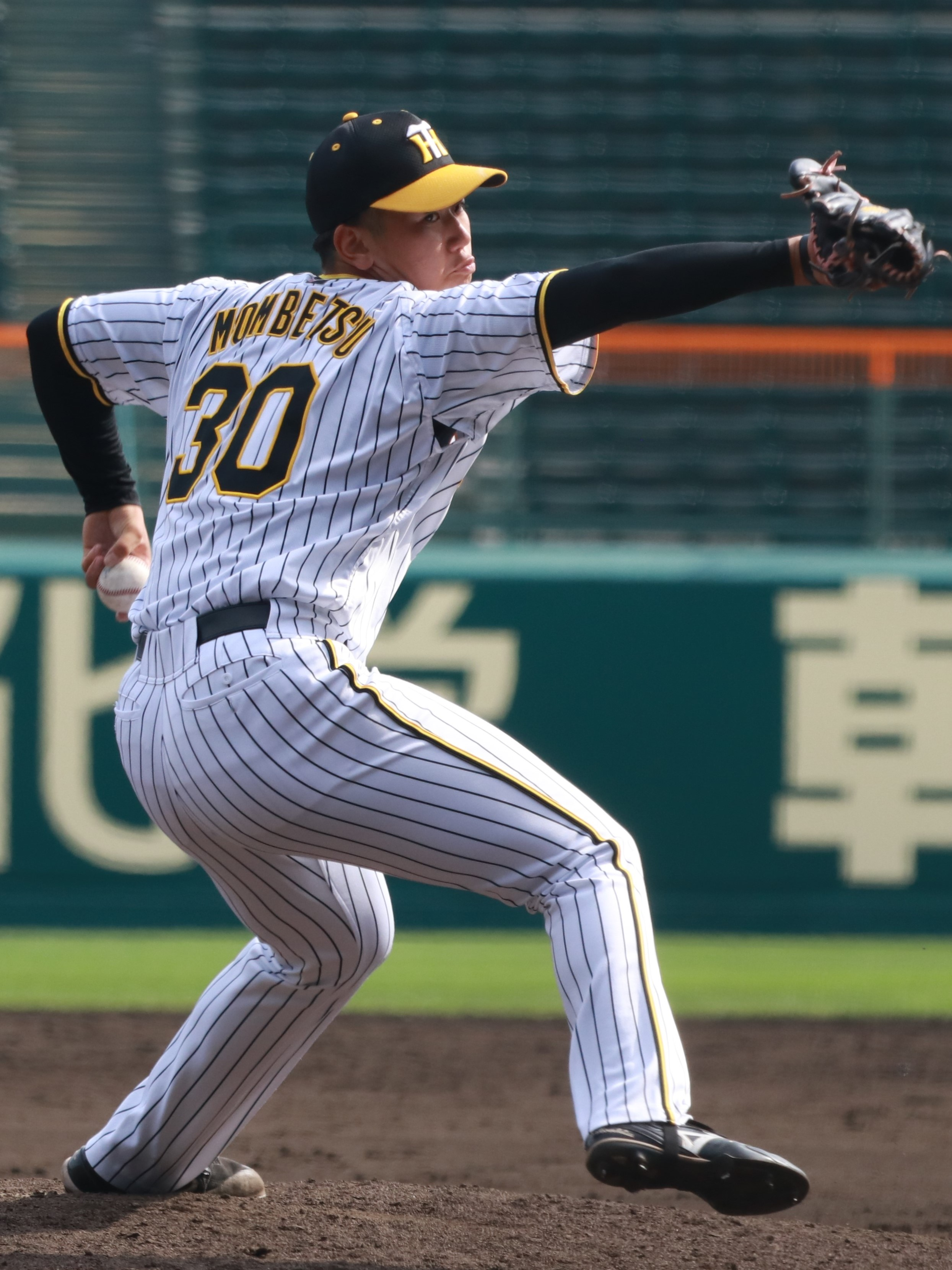

Hanshin Tigers – No. 30
- Pitcher
- Born: July 10, 2004 (age 21); Saru District, Hokkaido, Japan
- Bats: Left Throws: Left

NPB debut
- September 15, 2023, for the Hanshin Tigers

Career statistics (through 2024 season)
- Win–loss record: 0-2
- Earned run average: 4.05
- Strikeouts: 13
- Saves: 0
- Holds: 0

Teams
- Hanshin Tigers (2023–present)

Keito Mombetsu (門別 啓人, Mombetsu Keito; born July 10, 2004) is a professional Japanese baseball player. He is a pitcher for the Hanshin Tigers of Nippon Professional Baseball (NPB).
