= Shogo Asano =

Japanese baseball player (born 2004)

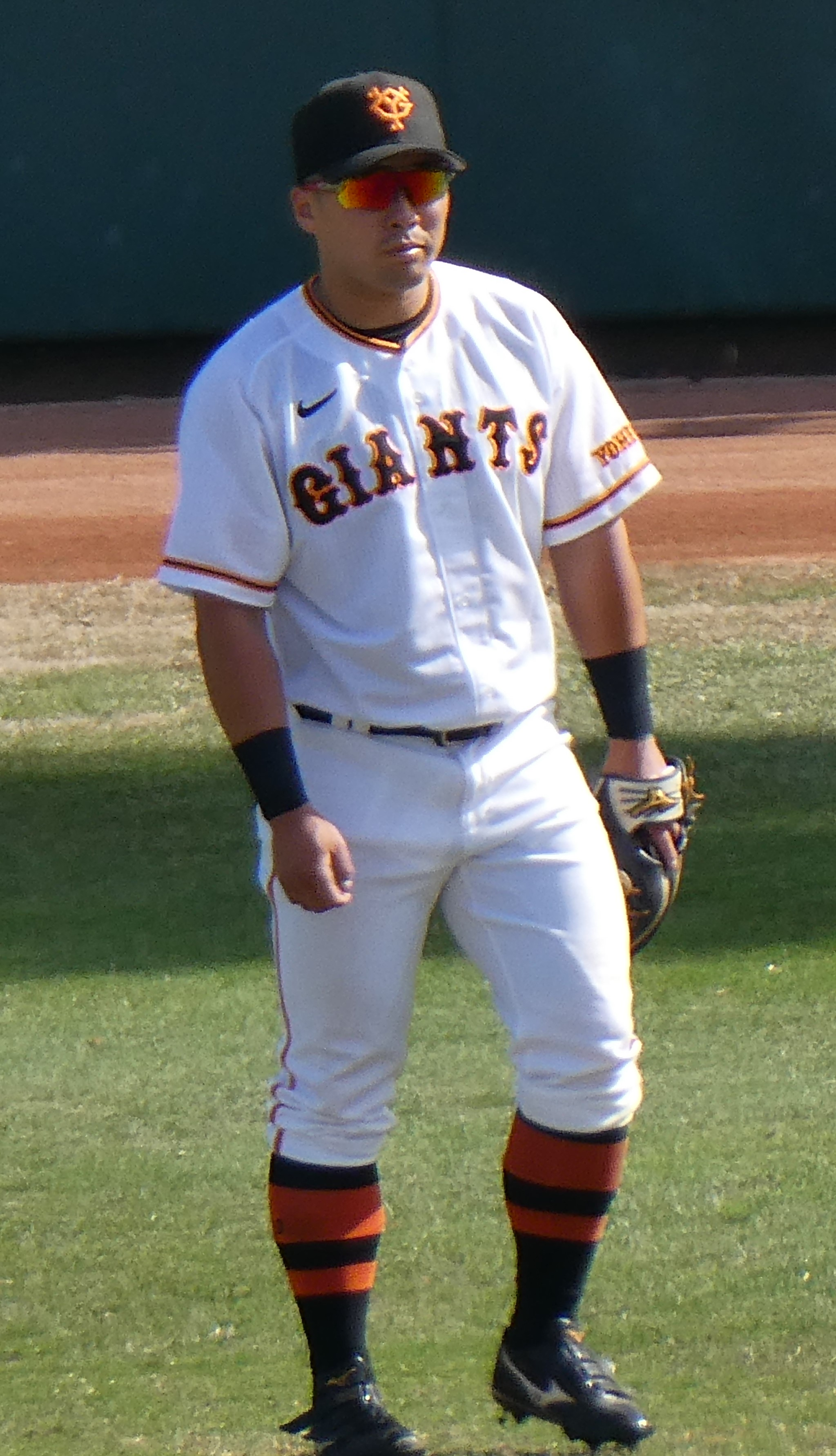
- Asano with the Yomiuri Giants

Yomiuri Giants – No. 51
- Outfielder
- Born: November 24, 2004 (age 21); Takamatsu, Kagawa, Japan
- Bats: Right Throws: Right

NPB debut
- July 8, 2023, for the Yomiuri Giants

NPB statistics (through October 12, 2024)
- Batting average: .242
- Home runs: 4
- RBI: 20
- Hits: 45
- Stolen base: 1

Teams
- Yomiuri Giants (2023–present)

Shogo Asano (浅野 翔吾, Asano Shōgo; born November 24, 2004 in Takamatsu, Kagawa, Japan) is a professional Japanese baseball player. He plays outfielder for the Yomiuri Giants.
