= Atsuki Tomosugi =

Japanese baseball player (born 2000)

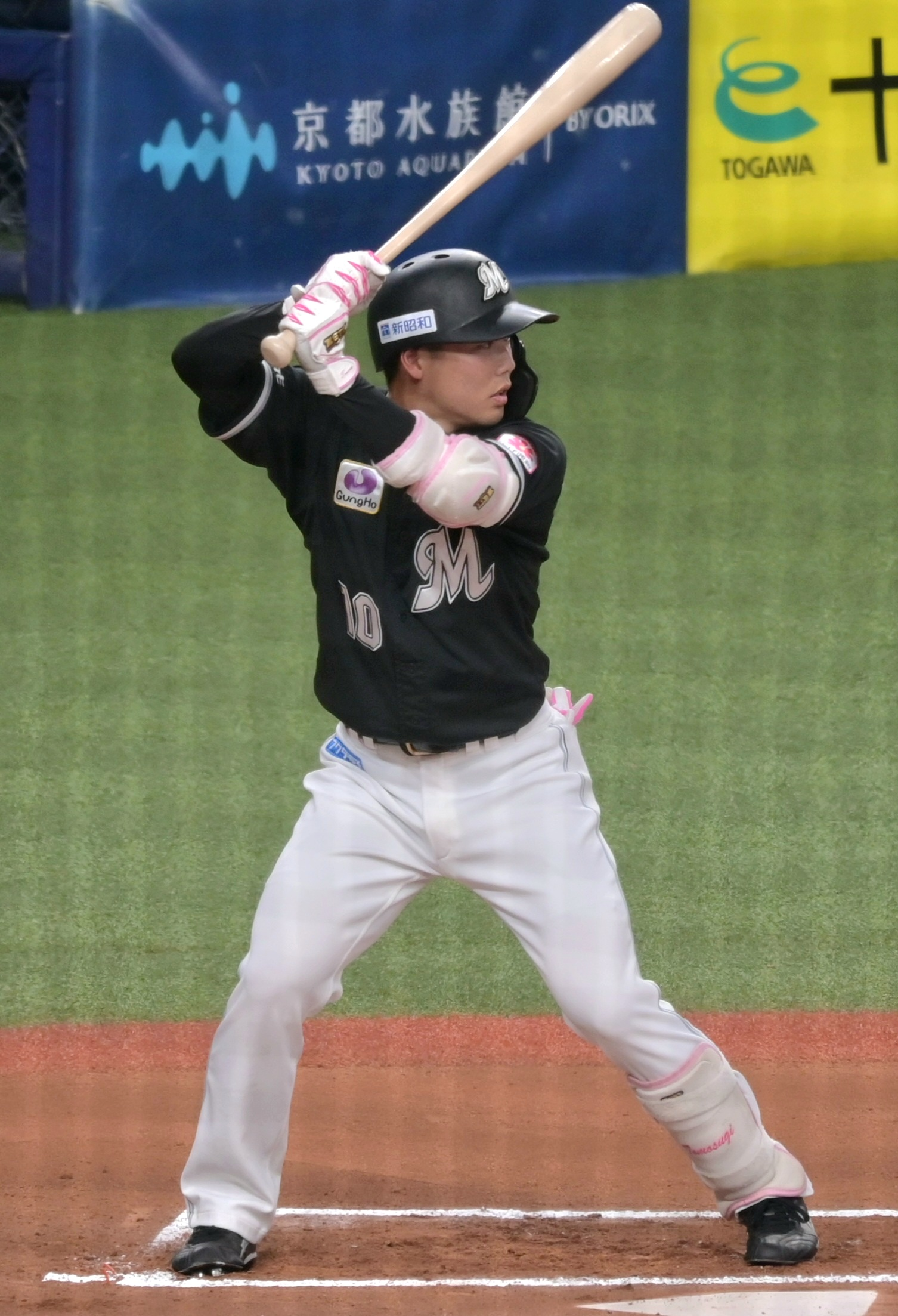

Chiba Lotte Marines – No. 4
- Infielder
- Born: November 7, 2000 (age 25); Osaka, Osaka, Japan
- Bats: Right Throws: Right

NPB debut
- April 1, 2023, for the Chiba Lotte Marines

NPB statistics (through 2023 season)
- Batting average: .254
- Hits: 47
- Home runs: 0
- Runs batted in: 9
- Sacrifice bunt: 14
- Stolen base: 9

Teams
- Chiba Lotte Marines (2023–present)

Atsuki Tomosugi (友杉 篤輝, Tomosugi Atsuki; born November 7, 2000 in Osaka, Osaka Prefecture) is a professional Japanese baseball player. He plays infielder for the Chiba Lotte Marines.
