= 2013 Nippon Professional Baseball draft =

2013 Nippon Professional Baseball Draft
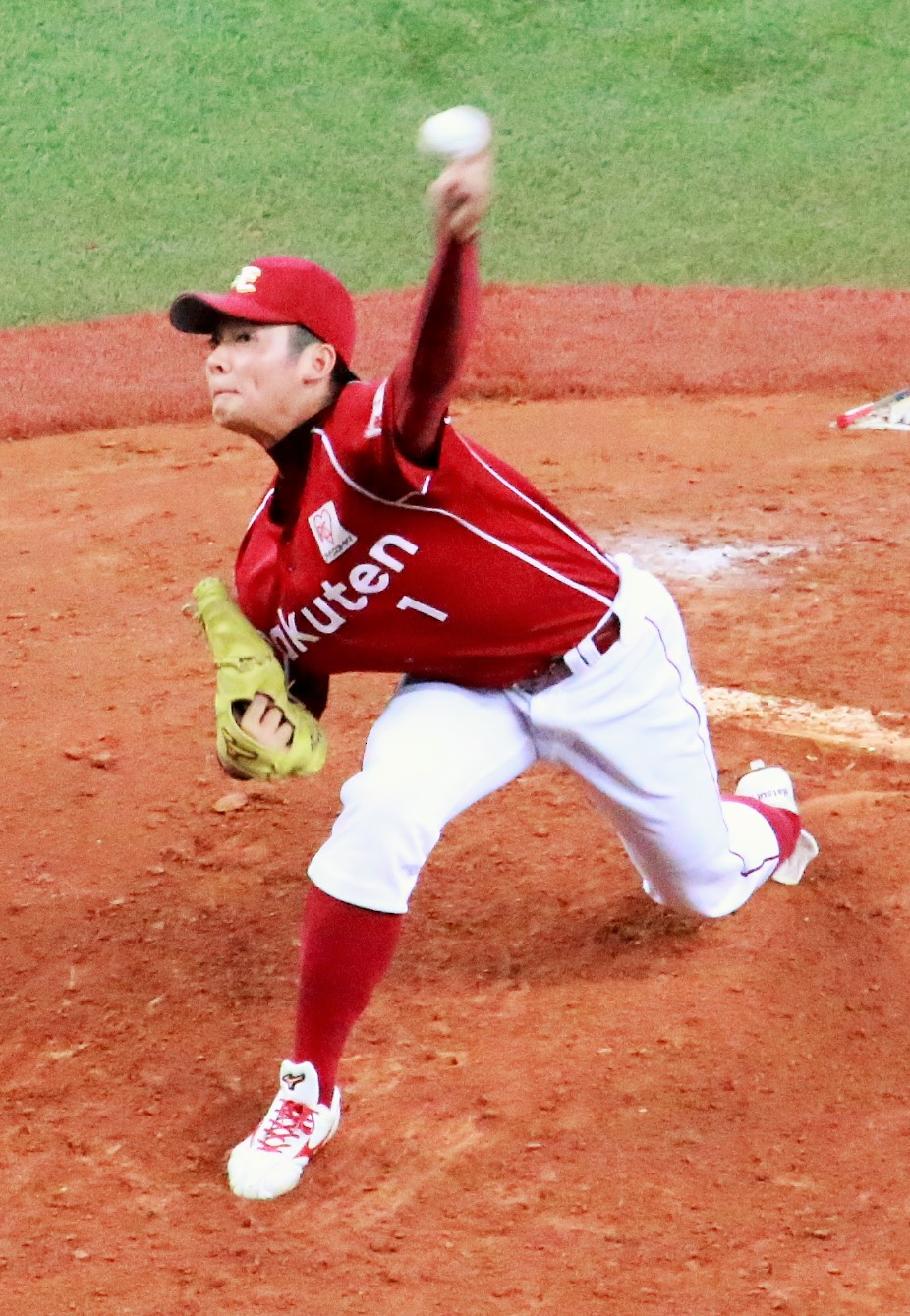
- Yuki Matsui, who was nominated and bid lottery for by five teams.

General information
- Sport: Baseball
- Date: October 24, 2013
- Location: Grand Prince Hotel Takanawa, Tokyo
- Networks: TBS (first round), sky-A
- Sponsored by: Taisho Pharmaceutical

Overview
- 89 total selections in 9 (Includes draft for developmental players) rounds
- League: Nippon Professional Baseball
- First round selections: Yuki Matsui; Daichi Osera; Ayumu Ishikawa

The 2013 Nippon Professional Baseball (NPB) Draft was held on October 24, 2013, for the 49th time at the Grand Prince Hotel Takanawa to assign amateur baseball players to the NPB. It was arranged with the special cooperation of Taisho Pharmaceutical with official naming rights. The draft was officially called "The Professional Baseball Draft Meeting supported by Lipovitan D ".

== Summary ==
Only the first round picks will be done by bid lottery. After the second round, waver selections were made in order from the lowest-ranked team of the 2013 season in both the Central and Pacific League, the third round was reversed and selections were made from the top team, and the fourth round was reversed again, alternating with selections from the lowest-ranked team until all teams had finished selecting players.

Since the 2005 season, the winner of the NPB All-Star Game has determined whether the Central League or the Pacific League gets waiver preference after the second round. However, the 2013 All-Star Game ended with a 1–1–1 record, so the decision was made by lot, with the Pacific League receiving waiver preference.

== First Round Contested Picks ==
	Player name	Position	Teams selected by
First Round	Yuki Matsui	Pitcher	Fighters, Baystars, Hawks, Dragonsi, **Eagles**
First Round	Daichi Osera	Pitcher	Swallows, **Carp**, Tigers
First Round	Ayumu Ishikawa	Pitcher	**Marines**, Giants
Second Round	Yuta Kakita	Pitcher	Fighters, **Baystars**, Tigers
Second Round	Toshihiro Sugiura	Pitcher	**Swallows**, Hawks
Third Round	Yuta Iwasada	Pitcher	Fighters, **Tigers**

- **Bolded** teams indicate who won the right to negotiate contract following a lottery.
- In the first round, **Kazumasa Yoshida** (pitcher) was selected by the **Buffaloes** and **Tomoya Mori** (catcher) by the **Lions** in the first round without a bid lottery.
- In the second round, **Shota Suzuki** (pitcher) was selected by the **Dragons** and **Seiji Kobayashi** (catcher) by the **Giants** without a bid lottery.
- In the thrird round, **Ren Kajiya** (pitcher) was selected by the **Hawks** without a bid lottery.
- In the fourth round, the last remaining the **Fighters**, selected **Ryo Watanabe** (Infielder).
- List of selected players.

== Selected Players ==
Key
*	Player did not sign

- The order of the teams is the order of second round waiver priority.
- **Bolded** After that, a developmental player who contracted as a registered player under control.
- List of selected players.

=== Hokkaido Nippon-Ham Fighters ===
Pick	Player name	Position	Team
#1	Ryo Watanabe	Infielder	Tokai University Kofu High School
#2	Hiroshi Urano	Pitcher	Sega Sammy
#3	Hiromi Oka	Infielder	Meiji University
#4	Hirotoshi Takanashi	Pitcher	Yamanashi Gakuin University
#5	Masashi Kanehira	Pitcher	Tokai Rika
#6	Akihiro Hakumura	Pitcher	Keio University
#7	Ryosuke Kishisato	Outfielder	Hanamaki Higashi High School
#8	Ryo Ishikawa	Catcher	Teikyo High School

=== Tokyo Yakult Swallows ===
Pick	Player name	Position	Team
#1	Toshihiro Sugiura	Pitcher	Kokugakuin University
#2	Naomichi Nishiura	Infielder	Hosei University
#3	Ryo Akiyoshi	Pitcher	Panasonic
#4	Keiji Iwahashi	Pitcher	Kyoto Sangyo University
#5	Yuto Kodama	Pitcher	Kanzei High School
#6	Ryota Fujii	Catcher	CITYLIGHT OKAYAMA

=== Orix Buffaloes ===
Pick	Player name	Position	Team
#1	Kazumasa Yoshida	Pitcher	JR-EAST
#2	Daiki Tohmei	Pitcher	Fuji Heavy Industries
#3	Kenya Wakatsuki	Catcher	Hanasaki Tokuharu High School
#4	Satoshi Sonobe	Infielder	Seiko Gakuin High School
#5	Yuto Yoshida	Outfielder	Hokusho High School
#6	Kyo Okunami	Infielder	Soshi Gakuen High School
#7	Kento Shibata	Pitcher	Shinano Grandserows
#8	Satoshi Ohyama	Pitcher	Sega Sammy
Developmental Player Draft
#1	Hiroaki Azuma	Infielder	Tokushima Indigo Socks

=== Yokohama DeNA Baystars ===
Pick	Player name	Position	Team
#1	Yuta Kakita	Pitcher	Nippon Life
#2	Shingo Hirata	Pitcher	Honda Kumamoto
#3	Hiroki Minei	Catcher	Asia University
#4	Tomoya Mikami	Pitcher	JX-ENEOS
#5	Taiki Sekine	Outfielder	Toho High School
#6	Shun Yamashita	Pitcher	Matsumoto University
Developmental Player Draft
#1	**Yoshiki Sunada**	Pitcher	Meiou High School
#2	**Kouhei Mantani**	Pitcher	Miki House REDS

=== Fukuoka Softbank Hawks ===
Pick	Player name	Position	Team
#1	Ren Kajiya	Pitcher	JR-Kyushu
#2	Yuito Mori	Pitcher	Mitsubishi Motors Kurashiki Oceans
#3	Ken Okamoto	Pitcher	NSSMC Kazusa Magic
#4	Seiji Uebayashi	Outfielder	Sendai Ikuei Gakuen High School
Developmental Player Draft
#1	**Shuta Ishikawa**	Pitcher	Soka University
#2	Shinsuke Toubou	Pitcher	Hamada Commercial High School
#3	**Kaisei Sone**	Catcher	Kyoto International High School
#4	**Masahiro Harimoto**	Catcher	Bukkyo University

=== Chunichi Dragons ===
Pick	Player name	Position	Team
#1	Shota Suzuki	Pitcher	Seirei Christopher High School
#2	Katsuki Matayoshi	Pitcher	Kagawa Olive Guyners
#3	Iori Katsura	Catcher	Osaka University of Commerce
#4	Takuma Achira	Pitcher	JR-EAST
#5	Daisuke Sobue	Pitcher	Toyota
#6	Takuto Fujisawa	Infielder	Seino Transportation
Developmental Player Draft
#1	**Junki Kishimoto**	Pitcher	Tsuruga Kehi High School
#2	Daisuke Hashizume	Infielder	Osaka University of Commerce

=== Chiba Lotte Marines ===
Pick	Player name	Position	Team
#1	Ayumu Ishikawa	Pitcher	Tokyo Gas
#2	Yuta Yoshida	Catcher	Rissho University
#3	Ryo Miki	Infielder	Jobu University
#4	Shohei Yoshihara	Pitcher	Nippon Life
#5	Seiya Inoue	Infielder	Nippon Life
#6	Kota Futaki	Pitcher	Kagoshima Joho High School
Developmental Player Draft
#1	**Ryuzo Hijii**	Catcher	Hojo High School

=== Hiroshima Carp ===
Pick	Player name	Position	Team
#1	Daichi Osera	Pitcher	Kyushu Kyoritsu University
#2	Aren Kuri	Pitcher	Asia University
#3	Kosuke Tanaka	Infielder	JR-EAST
#4	Keita Nishihara	Pitcher	Nichidai
#5	Yuta Nakamura	Pitcher	Kanto Daiichi High School

=== Saitama Seibu Lions ===
Pick	Player name	Position	Team
#1	Tomoya Mori	Catcher	Osaka Toin High School
#2	Hotaka Yamakawa	Infielder	Fuji University
#3	Takuya Toyoda	Pitcher	TDK
#4	Kazuki Kaneko	Infielder	Nihon University Fujisawa High School
#5	Takayuki Yamaguchi	Pitcher	Toyota Motors East Japan
#6	Masatoshi Okada	Catcher	Osaka Gas
#7	Kentaro Fukukura	Pitcher	Daiichi Institute of Technology

=== Hanshin Tigers ===
Pick	Player name	Position	Team
#1	Yuta Iwasada	Pitcher	Yokohama College of Commerce
#2	Shintaro Yokota	Outfielder	Kagoshima Jitsugyo High School
#3	Naomasa Yokawa	Infielder	Tokyo University of Agriculture
#4	Ryutaro Umeno	Catcher	Fukuoka University
#5	Shoya Yamamoto	Pitcher	Oji Paper Company
#6	Suguru Iwazaki	Pitcher	Kokushikan University

=== Tohoku Rakuten Golden Eagles ===
Pick	Player name	Position	Team
#1	Yuki Matsui	Pitcher	Toko Gakuen High School
#2	Yasuhito Uchida	Catcher	Joso Gakuin High School
#3	Kodai Hamaya	Pitcher	Honda Suzuka
#4	Yuri Furukawa	Pitcher	Arita Technical High School
#5	Yusuke Nishimiya	Pitcher	Yokohama College of Commerce
#6	Takaaki Yokoyama	Pitcher	Waseda University
#7	Kazutomo Aihara	Pitcher	The 77 Bank
#8	Susumu Aizawa	Pitcher	Nippon Paper Industries Ishinomaki
#9	Ryuta Konno	Pitcher	Iwadeyama High School

=== Yomiuri Giants ===
Pick	Player name	Position	Team
#1	Seiji Kobayashi	Catcher	Nippon Life
#2	Ren Wada	Intfielder	Kochi High School
#3	Kazuto Taguchi	Pitcher	Hiroshima Shinjo High School
#4	Nobuyuki Okumura	Intfielder	Nihon University Yamagata High School
#5	Kentaro Taira	Pitcher	Hokuzan High School
Developmental Player Draft
#1	**Makoto Aoyama**	Outfielder	Nihon University
#2	Shota Nagae	Pitcher	Osaka University of Economics
#3	Ryusei Kitanosono	Pitcher	Shugakukan High School

Preceded by 2012	Nippon Professional Baseball draft	Succeeded by 2014
