= Naomasa Yokawa =

Japanese baseball player (born 1991)

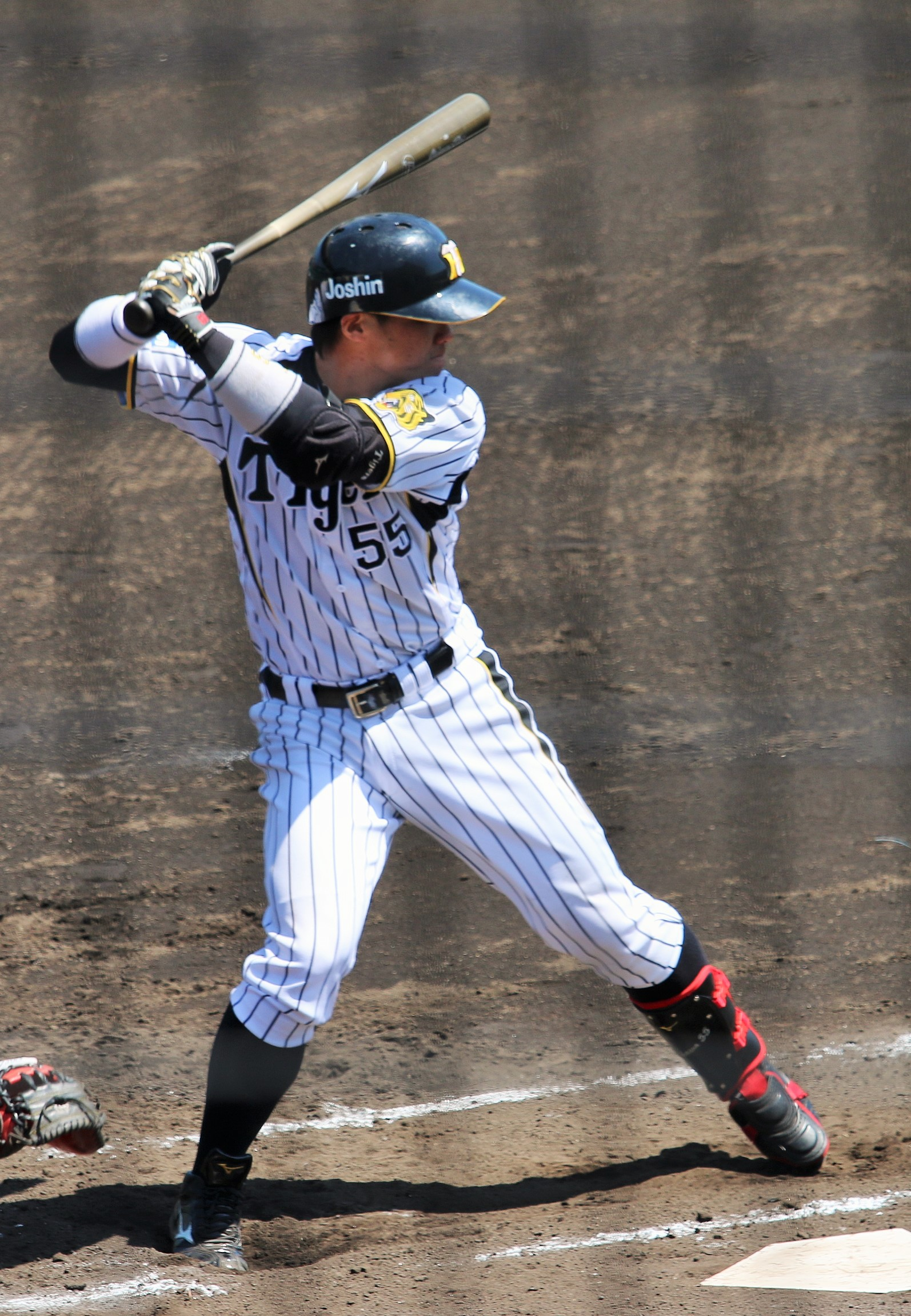
- Yokawa with the Hanshin Tigers

Saitama Seibu Lions – No. 52
- Infielder
- Born: July 17, 1991 (age 34); Jōtō-ku, Osaka, Japan
- Bats: Right Throws: Right

NPB debut
- April 15, 2016, for the Hanshin Tigers

NPB statistics (through 2022 season)
- Batting average: .227
- Home runs: 23
- RBI: 93
- Stats at Baseball Reference

Teams
- Hanshin Tigers (2014–2022); Saitama Seibu Lions (2023–present)

Naomasa Yokawa (陽川 尚将, Yōkawa Naomasa; born July 17, 1991 in Osaka) is a Japanese professional baseball infielder for the Saitama Seibu Lions in Japan's Nippon Professional Baseball.

== Early baseball career ==
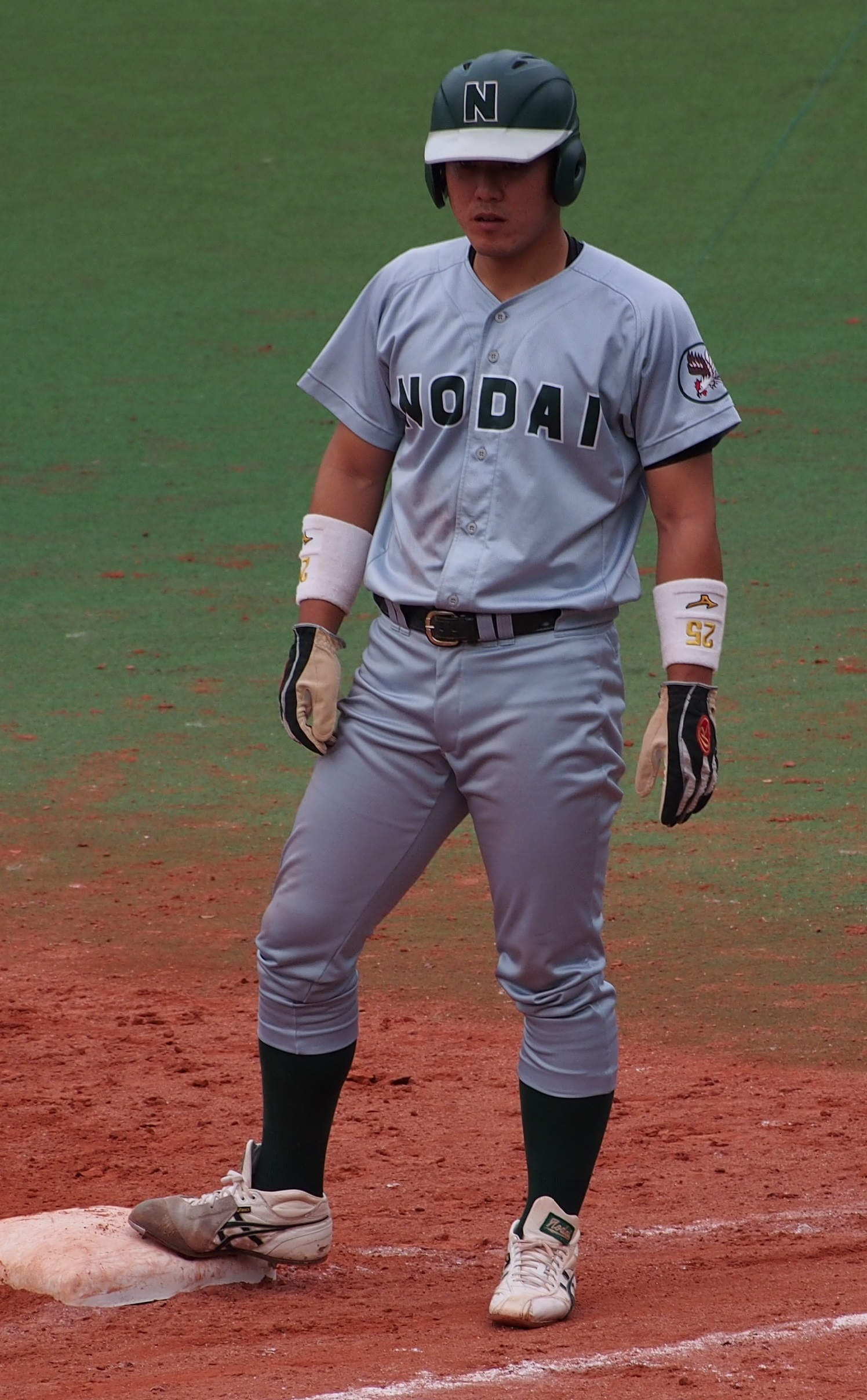
2013 at Meiji Jingu Stadium

Yokawa started playing baseball in 2nd grade as a third baseman for the East Sekime Lions (little league), then he doubled as a pitcher and infielder in junior high. He was converted to a shortstop upon entering Konkōōsaka High School, and experienced playing in the Spring Koshien in his third year. He hit a total of 36 home runs in his high school career.

During the 2009 draft, the Yomiuri Giants chose him as their third pick for the ikusei draft (developmental draft), but he rejected their offer and opted to enroll in Tokyo Nodai instead. He played as third baseman and was a regular in the Tohto League games. In 4 years, he recorded 109 hits, 51 RBIs, and 23 home runs.

== Hanshin Tigers ==
Before the 2013 draft, he said that he would turn pro only if he was drafted in the 3rd round or earlier, but will play for the industrial leagues otherwise. The Tigers chose him as their 3rd pick, and he accepted their offer. He was assigned the jersey number 55.

2014

He spent his first year playing in minor league games. In his 98-game appearances, he batted 0.241, recorded 38 RBIs and 6 home runs. Although he alternated playing as 1st and 3rd baseman, he committed 12 errors when he played the latter.

2015

He started training as an infielder with the main squad during spring camp, but dislocated his left shoulder when he made a diving catch during a friendly match with the Samsung Lions (KBO). Afterwards, he underwent rehabilitation for 3 months. He resumed playing in the Western League (minors) in June, and even got selected as a nominee for Fresh All Star Games. In 54 games, he recorded a batting average of 0.213, 16 RBIs and 3 home runs.

During off-season, he was selected to play for the national team in the Winter League games in Taiwan. He played as a short stop or 2nd baseman in 17 games, batted an average of 0.345, and recorded 13 RBIs including 2 home runs.。

2016

He started the year with an impressive performance during the pre-season exhibition games and farm games. By April, he secured the cleanup position, topped the player rankings by hitting 0.347, and got awarded the MVP of the month for 2 consecutive months for scoring 18 RBIs (5 home runs). He got promoted to the main squad during the April 15 match against the Dragons, and recorded his first hit on his first at-bat during the top of the 7th inning. On April 29, his first career home run won the match against the Baystars, and he got to experience his first hero interview with pitcher and fellow 2013 draftee Yuta Iwasada. He then alternated as a 3rd baseman or left outfielder during his next appearances, though mostly as substitute for other starters, until he fell into a slump and was eventually sent back to the farm. While his performance in the main squad games was not the best, he redeemed himself in the minors where he got the triple crown title; he was the batting champion with an average of 0.301, RBI leader with 62 RBIs, and home run leader with 14 home runs (tied with another Softbank player). He also got awarded the 2016 Hanshin Farm MVP.

2017

Except for a brief and unsuccessful stint with the main squad in July, he spent most of the season in the farms. He continued to play well in the Western League games and peaked in September when he hit home runs in 5 consecutive games. This got him brought back to the main squad again, but saw fewer plate appearances after falling short of expectations. He finished the season in the farms and once again topped the league in RBIs with 91, and tied with Carp's Xavier Batista as the home run leader with 21. But despite these achievements, his lackluster performance in the main squad earned him a half a million pay cut which brought his annual salary to 8.5 million yen, as management deemed the minor league titles useless if he cannot bring his A-game to where it matters.

2018

He once more spent the first half of the season in the minors where he competed with Yutaro Itayama for the clean up position. Only when new import Willin Rosario fell into a slump in June was he finally given a spot in the main squad. He rose to the occasion and went 2-for-4 with 4 RBIs(1 HR) in his first game against the Lions on June 4. He continued his hitting streak and batted 0.358 in June, and by July he was a regular cleanup and starter. Later on, he was assigned to man the outfield as there was a surplus of good infielders. He finished the season in the main squad, where more than half of his 75 appearances were as a clean up hitter. His record was a personal best of 48 RBIs including 6 home runs, and an average of 0.252. In October, he also underwent surgery to clean out his right elbow as he experienced pain with it that caused him to be taken off the roster in August. His productive season earned him an 11.5 million yen pay raise, bringing his annual salary to 20 million.

2019

He was not in top form at the start of the season, owing partly to his surgery in the previous year. He appeared in a handful of outings starting late April, and was used mostly as a pinch hitter throughout the season. He only got included in the line-up during starts of left-handed pitchers, and finished the season with a dismal 0.109 batting average, 4 RBIs which included 3 solo home runs in 28 games. This earned him a 1 million pay cut for the next year.

== Playing Style ==
He employs a powerful swing on the plate, and possesses stamina that can last him throughout an entire game, as he demonstrated during his university days.

== Personal Trivia ==
When his performance began to improve in 2017, his teammates in the farm noticed his habit of pounding his chest with his palms after he hits a home run, and promptly gave him the nickname "Gorilla". By 2018, his teammates would do the "Gorilla Pose" ("Go-ri-ra Po-su" or ゴリラポーズ) after he hit one home run after another, both in the farm and main squad games. This eventually spread and even the main squad members now call him by this nickname, and greet him with this chest-slapping gesture as he returns to the dugout after a successful run.

After his hitting picked up in the latter half of the 2020 season, he owned up to his "Gorilla" character and his home runs became known as the "Gorilla Punch". During a post-match interview with Onelki Garcia on August 26, the pitcher jokingly said that Yokawa's strength came from "banana power" and handed him a banana. Afterwards, Hanshin began selling banana-themed banners to promote him to the fans. Despite not really liking bananas, he said that he was able to hit the winning home run on September 13 against the Carps because he ate a banana before the game. Later on, in addition to chest-slaps, his teammates now present him with bananas when he returns to the dugout after a home run.
