= Shota Suzuki =

Shota Suzuki may refer to:

- Shōta Suzuki (baseball, born 1995) (鈴木 翔太), Japanese baseball player
- Shōta Suzuki (baseball, born 1998) (鈴木 翔太), Japanese baseball player
- Shota Suzuki (footballer, born 1984) (鈴木 将太), Japanese footballer
- Shota Suzuki (footballer, born 1996) (鈴木 翔太), Japanese footballer

== See also ==
- Shoto Suzuki (born 1992), Japanese footballer
