= Yuta Nakamura =

Japanese baseball player (born 1995)

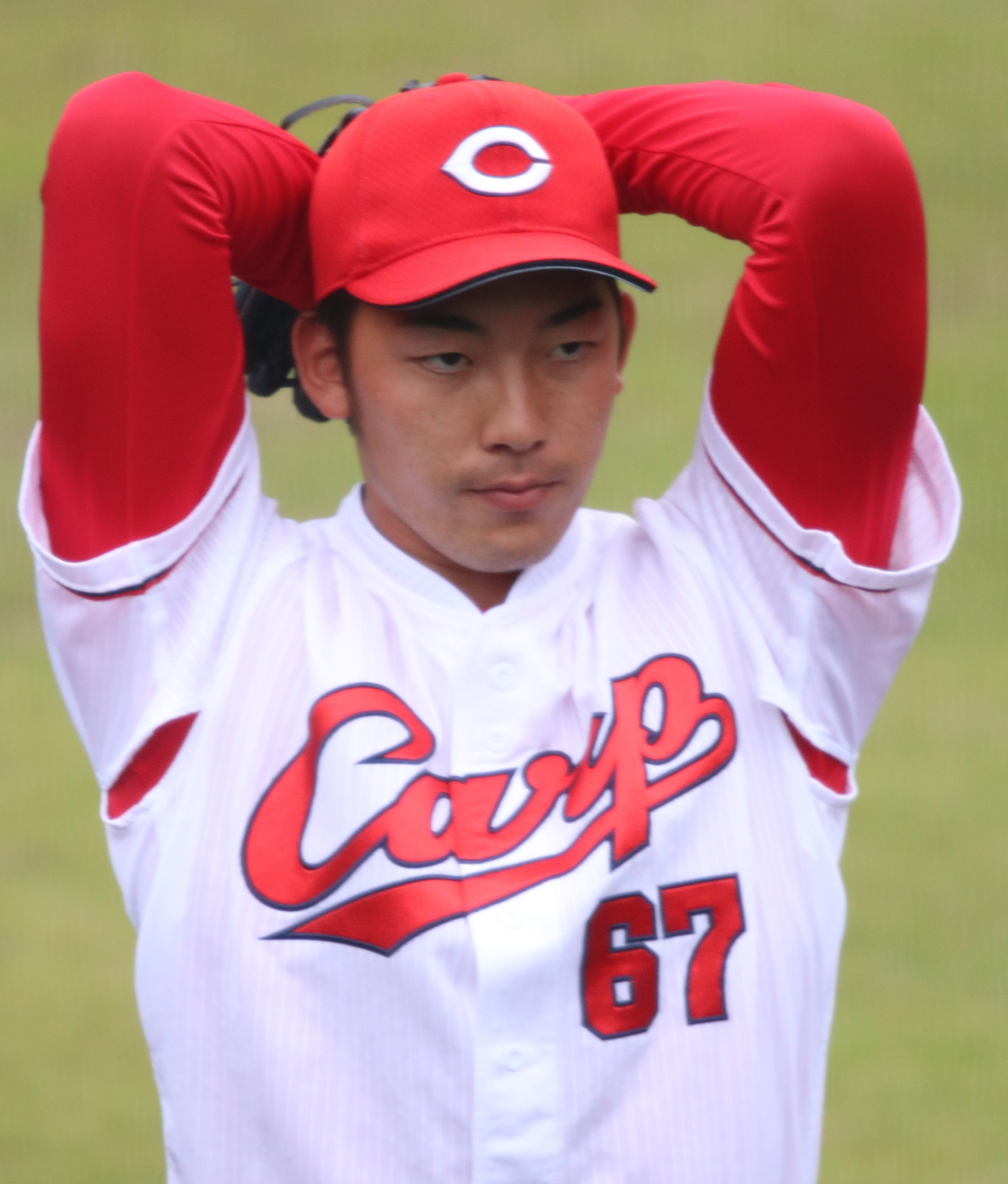

Saitama Seibu Lions – No. 58
- Pitcher
- Born: August 31, 1995 (age 31); Edogawa, Tokyo, Japan
- Bats: Right Throws: Right

NPB debut
- May 3, 2017, for the Hiroshima Toyo Carp

NPB statistics (through 2021 season)
- Win–loss record: 11–15
- Earned run average: 4.73
- Strikeouts: 132

Teams
- Hiroshima Toyo Carp (2017–2023); Saitama Seibu Lions (2024–present)

Yuta Nakamura (中村 祐太, Nakamura Yuta; born August 31, 1995) is a Japanese baseball pitcher for the Saitama Seibu Lions of Nippon Professional Baseball.

Nakamura attended Kanto Daiichi High School, and was selected by the Hiroshima Toyo Carp in the 2013 Nippon Professional Baseball draft as the team's fifth pick. He pitched in the Western League for three full seasons until making his NBP debut with the Carp in 2017. Since his first-team debut in 2017, Nakamura has split time between the Central League's Carp and the Western League's Carp.

On December 8, 2023, Nakamura was nominated and transferred to the Saitama Seibu Lions in the NPB active player draft.
