= Shintaro Yokota =

Japanese baseball player (1995–2023)

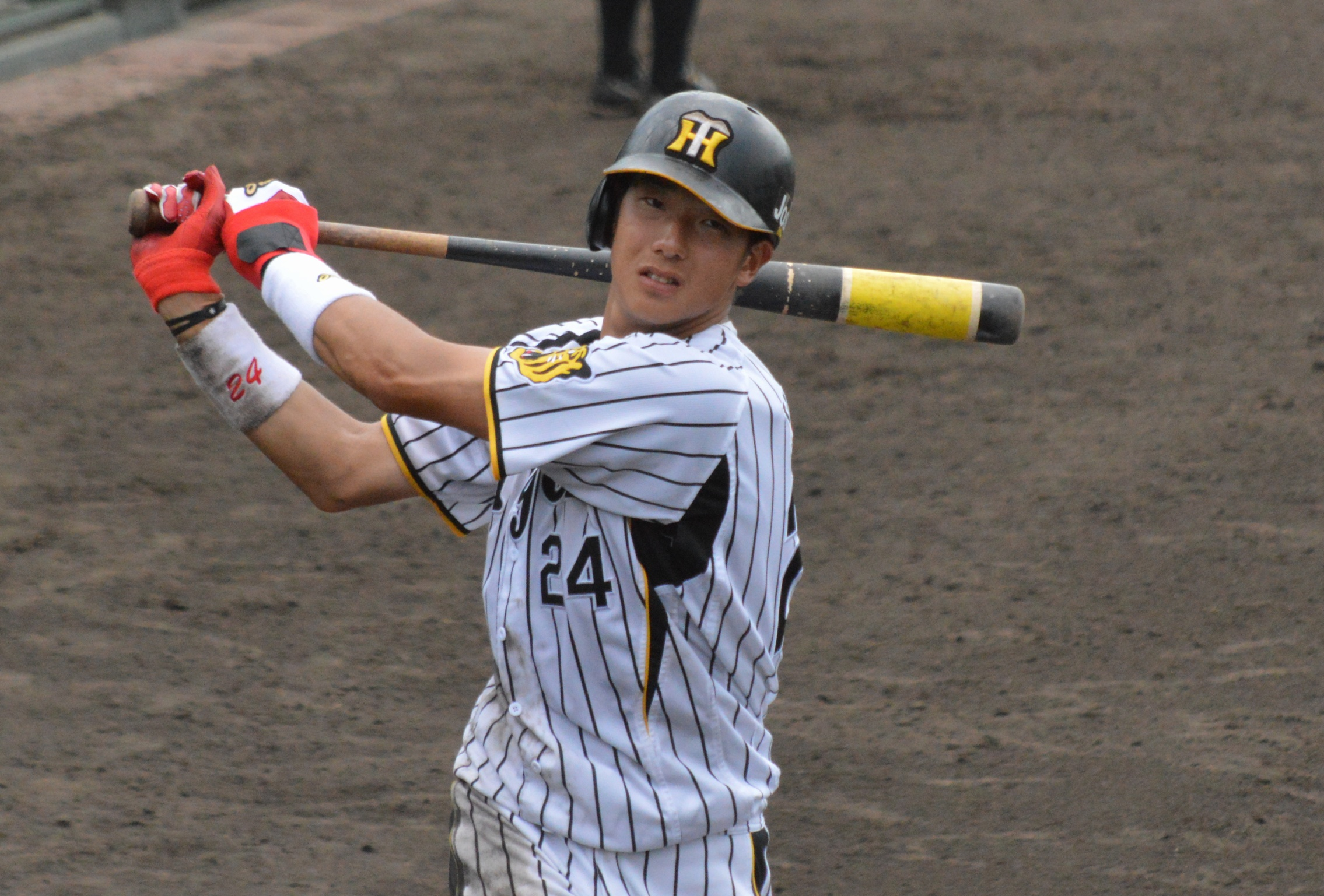
- Yokota with the Hanshin Tigers in 2014
- Outfielder
- Born: June 9, 1995; Hioki, Kagoshima, Japan
- Died: July 18, 2023 (aged 28)
- Batted: Left Threw: Left

NPB debut
- March 25, 2016, for the Hanshin Tigers

NPB statistics
- Batting average: .191
- Runs: 14
- Stolen bases: 4
- Stats at Baseball Reference

Teams
- Hanshin Tigers (2014–2019)

Shintaro Yokota (横田 慎太郎, Yokota Shintarō; June 9, 1995 – July 18, 2023) was a Japanese professional baseball outfielder for the Hanshin Tigers Nippon Professional Baseball. He played for the Tigers from 2014 to 2019.

== Early baseball career ==
Born in Hioki, Kagoshima, Shintaro was the son of Masashi Yokota, a former outfielder for the Lotte Orions (now Chiba Lotte Marines). His family migrated to Kagoshima when he was 3, and he started playing softball in third grade all the way to junior high.

Yokota entered Kagoshima Jitsugyō High School, and batted fourth in his first year. From his third year onwards, he doubled as a pitcher and, with a fastball that surpassed 140 km/h, became the school's ace. Unfortunately, his team always got eliminated during the prefectural tournament. He recorded a total of 29 home runs during his high school career.

== Professional career ==
Yokota was the 2nd pick of the Hanshin Tigers in the 2013 Nippon Professional Baseball draft. He inherited Shinjiro Hiyama's former jersey number, 24. He spent the 2014 and 2015 seasons with Hanshin's Western League affiliate. Yokota made his debut with the Tigers on Opening Day of the 2016 season in centerfield. He would play 38 games in the Central League in 2016, again spending the bulk of the season in the Western League. After a lost 2017 season due to treatment for a brain tumor, Yokota returned to Hanshin on a development player contract for the 2018 season. However, Yokota continued to be plagued by after-effects from his cancer treatment, forcing him to retire at the end of the season.

== Playing style ==
Yokota's physical prowess was highly praised, and even likened to that of Yoshio Itoi's, earning him the moniker "Itoi junior". He employed solid batting techniques, was also known to have a good sense for the ball. He possessed arm strength worthy of a pitcher, and his speed (6.1 seconds for a 50-meter dash) was also one of his better selling points.

== Illness and death ==
In February 2017, Yokota experienced headaches; he was later diagnosed with a brain tumor. He underwent treatment over the following six months. On September 3, 2017, he announced that he was in remission. Yokota made an attempt at returning to baseball after treatment, but due to dealing with the after-effects of his treatment, including blurred and double vision, his comeback attempt was short-lived. Yokota later cited teammate Fumihito Haraguchi, who also dealt with cancer, as an inspiration for his recovery.

Yokota died of brain cancer on July 18, 2023, at age 28.

== Legacy ==
His walk-up song, "Bridge of Glory" (栄光の架橋, Eikō no Kakyō), sung by the due Yuzu; became a way of the Hanshin Tigers (and its fans) to show support during his battle against cancer, and after its death as a way to remember his life and his love for both Baseball and Tigers, such examples include the first team practice following his death, the top of 9th inning at the 2023 Central League pennant clinching game, and at a Koshien Stadium public viewing for 2023 Japan Series game 7.

After the Tigers won the 2023 Central League pennant and the 2023 Japan Series, the team celebrated by throwing closer Suguru Iwazaki in the air, with Iwazaki holding Yokota's #24 jersey. Iwazaki and Yokota joined the Tigers at the same time: the Tigers drafted Iwazaki sixth

The autobiography about Yokota ´s fight with illiness, "Miraculous Back-Home" (奇跡のバックホーム, Kiseki no Back Home) , was adapted intro a TV drama in 2022, and in 2025, days before Hanshin Tigers clinched the 2025 Central League, it was announced that the same book would be adapted to a movie as well with the title "Glorious Back-Home" (栄光のバックホーム, Eikō no bakkuhōmu), the movie also used his walk-up song as theme song.

While his uniform number, 24, was not retired, he is still to this day, often referred to by fans as the "Eternal Number 24".
