= Hiroshi Urano =

Japanese baseball player

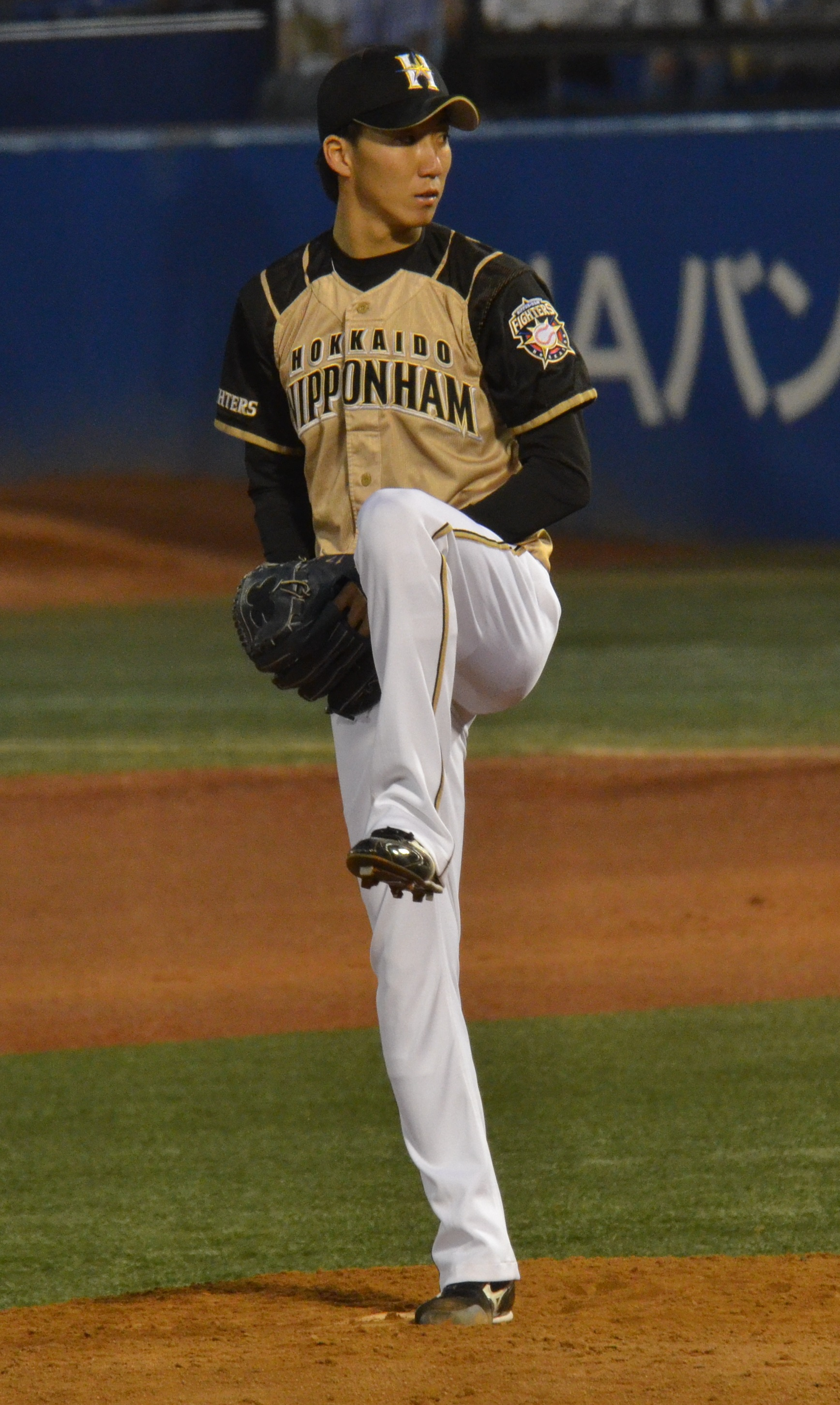
- Urano with the Hokkaido Nippon-Ham Fighters

Hokkaido Nippon Ham Fighters – No. 83
- Pitcher/Coach
- Born: July 22, 1989 (age 36); Fukuroi, Shizuoka, Japan
- Batted: Right Threw: Right

NPB debut
- April 5, 2014, for the Hokkaido Nippon-Ham Fighters

Last NPB appearance
- October 31, 2020, for the Hokkaido Nippon-Ham Fighters

NPB statistics (through 2020 season)
- Win–loss record: 18–13
- Earned run average: 3.87
- Strikeouts: 207
- Saves: 7
- Holds: 16
- Stats at Baseball Reference

Teams
- As player: Hokkaido Nippon-Ham Fighters (2014–2020); As coach: Hokkaido Nippon-Ham Fighters (2024-present)

Hiroshi Urano (浦野 博司, Urano Hiroshi; born July 22, 1989) is a Japanese former professional baseball pitcher. He has played in his entire career with the Nippon Professional Baseball (NPB) for the Hokkaido Nippon-Ham Fighters.

== Career ==
Hokkaido Nippon-Ham Fighters selected Urano with the second selection in the 2013 Nippon Professional Baseball draft.

On April 5, 2014, Urano made his NPB debut.

On October 27, 2020, Urano announced his retirement.
