= Akihiro Hakumura =

Japanese former baseball player

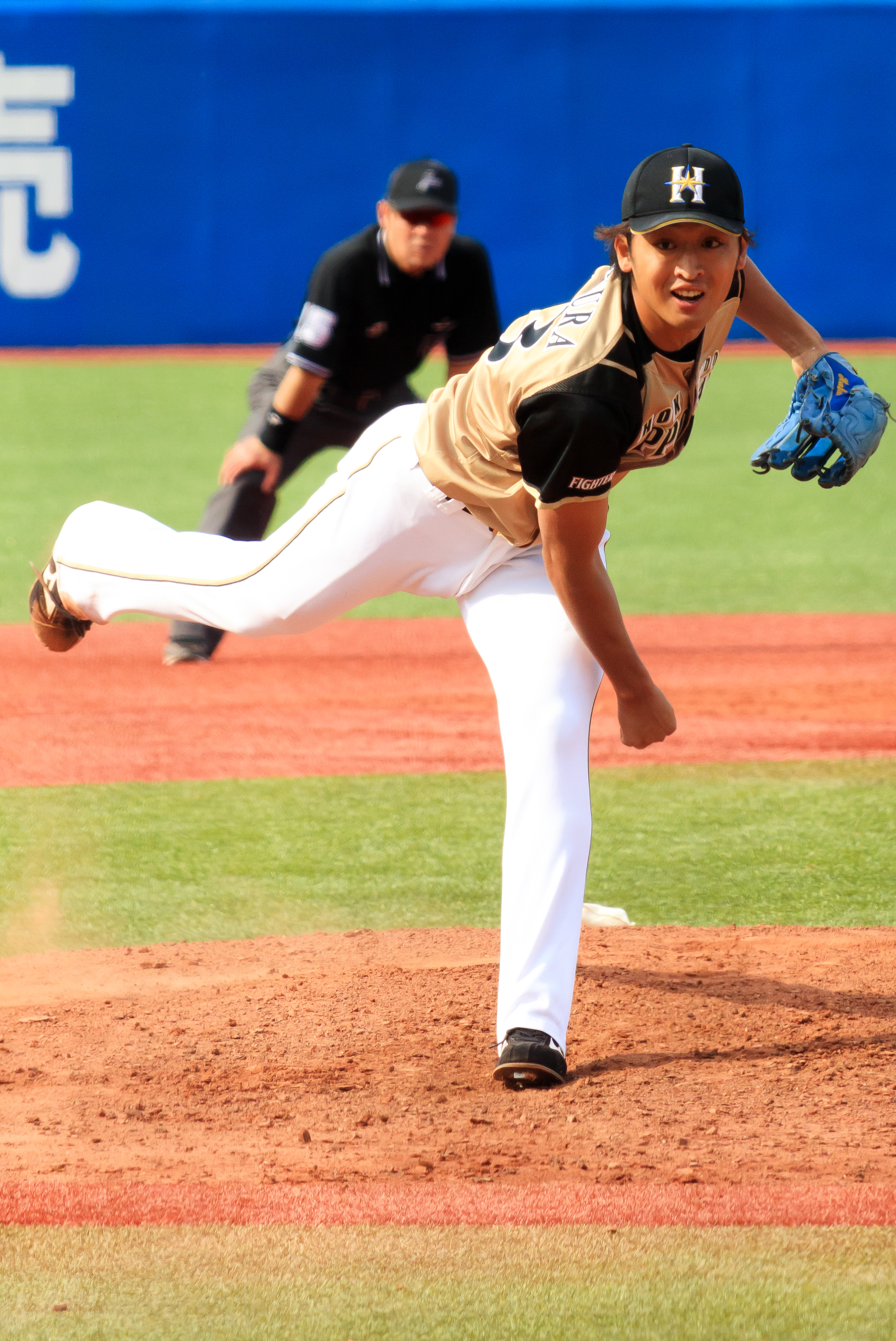
- Hakumura with the Nippon Ham Fighters
- Outfielder
- Born: December 11, 1991 (age 34); Minokamo, Gifu, Japan
- Batted: Left Threw: Right

debut
- June 27, 2014, for the Hokkaido Nippon-Ham Fighters

Last NPB appearance
- September 26, 2019, for the Hokkaido Nippon-Ham Fighters
- Stats at Baseball Reference

Teams
- Hokkaido Nippon-Ham Fighters (2014–2020)

Akihiro Hakumura (白村 明弘, Hakumura Akihiro; born December 11, 1991) is a Japanese former professional baseball outfielder. He has played in his entire career with the Nippon Professional Baseball (NPB) for the Hokkaido Nippon-Ham Fighters.

== Career ==
Hokkaido Nippon-Ham Fighters selected Hakumura with the sixth selection in the 2013 Nippon Professional Baseball draft.

On June 27, 2016, Hakumura made his NPB debut.

On November 5, 2020, Hakumura announced his retirement.
