= Ken Okamoto =

Japanese baseball player

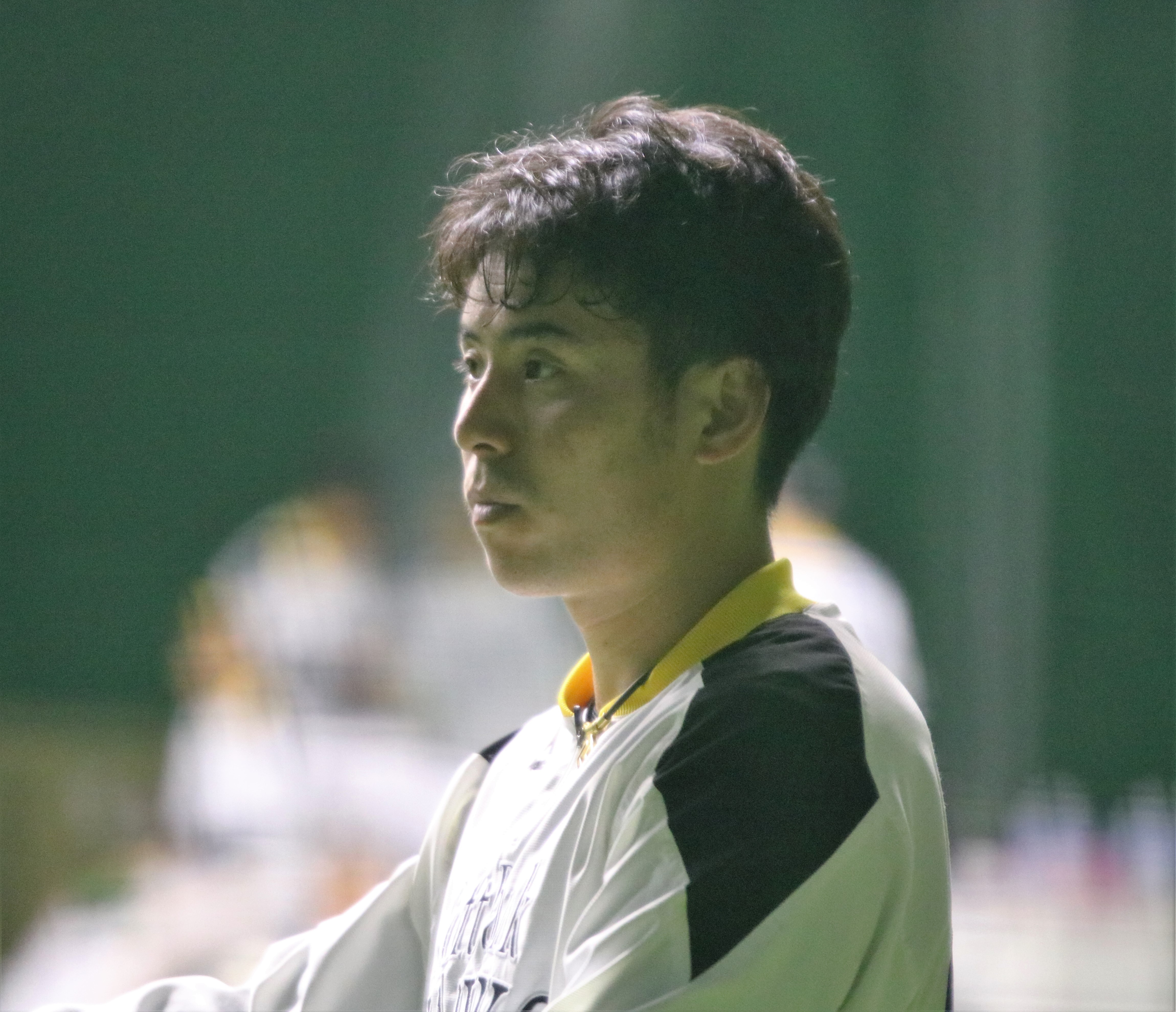
- Okamoto with the Fukuoka SoftBank Hawks
- Pitcher
- Born: October 29, 1992 (age 33); Himeji, Hyōgo, Japan
- Bats: Right Throws: Right

NPB debut
- April 17, 2016, for the Fukuoka SoftBank Hawks

NPB statistics (through 2019 season)
- Win–loss record: 2-1
- ERA: 3.42
- Holds: 1
- Strikeouts: 41
- Stats at Baseball Reference

Teams
- Fukuoka SoftBank Hawks (2014–2019)

Career highlights and awards
- 2× Japan Series Champion (2017, 2018)

Ken Okamoto (岡本 健, Okamoto Ken; born October 29, 1992) is a Japanese Professional baseball pitcher for the Fukuoka SoftBank Hawks of Nippon Professional Baseball.

== Early Baseball career ==
Okamoto participated in the 3rd grade spring 82nd Japanese High School Baseball Invitational Tournament as an ace pitcher at Kobe International University Attached High School.

In 2013, He won the 39th Japan Corporate Baseball Leaguel Championship as the Nippon Steel Kazusa Magic pitcher and was chosen as a Most valuable player.

== Professional career ==
On October 24, 2013, Okamoto was drafted by the Fukuoka Softbank Hawks in the 2013 Nippon Professional Baseball draft.
