= Kodai Hamaya =

Japanese baseball player (born 1993)

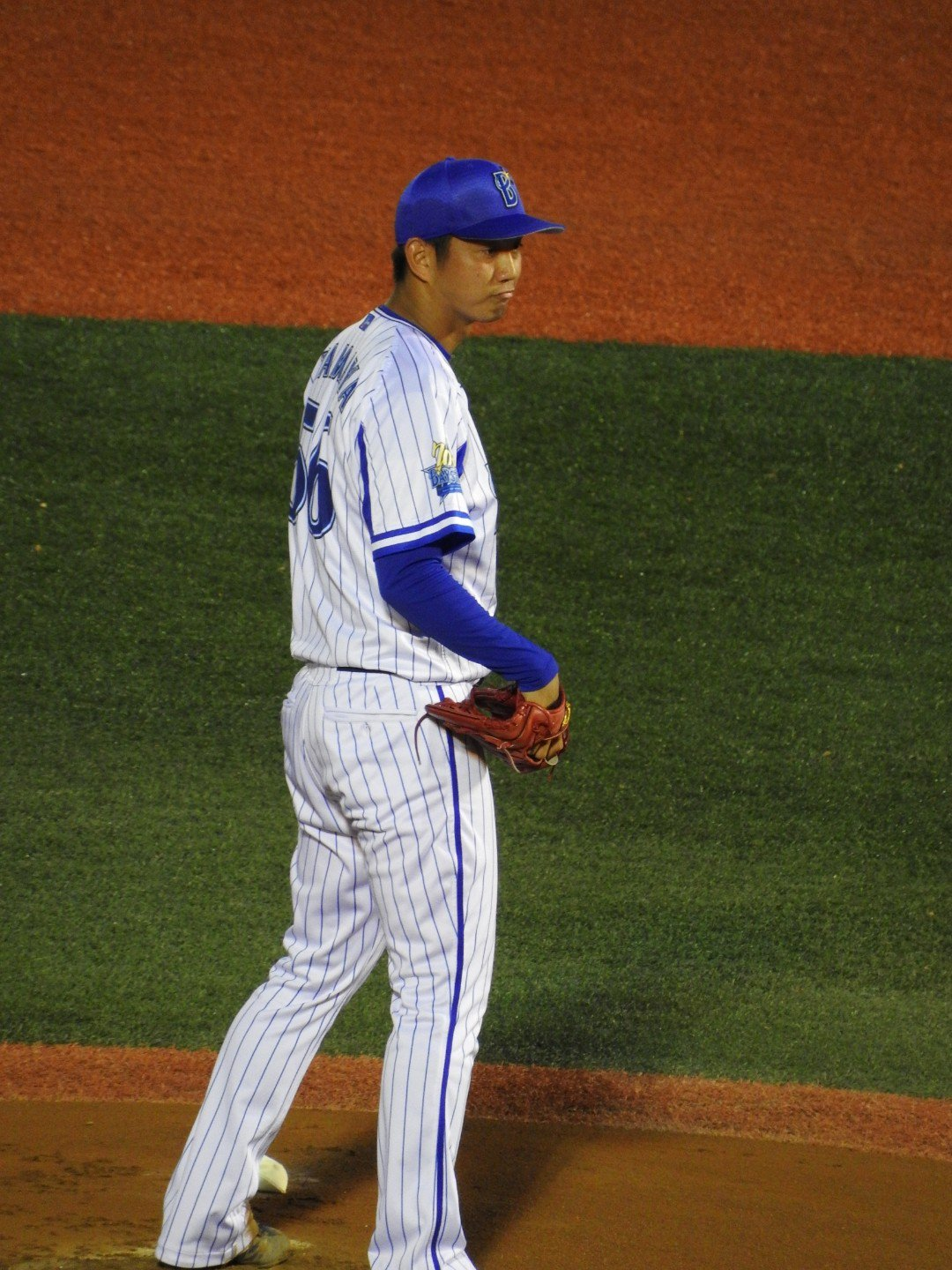
- Hamaya with the Yokohama DeNA Baystars.

Free agent
- Pitcher
- Born: February 27, 1993 (age 33); Totsukawa, Nara Prefecture, Japan
- Bats: Left Throws: Left

NPB debut
- September 28, 2014, for the Tohoku Rakuten Golden Eagles

NPB statistics (through 2020 season)
- Win–loss record: 3–1
- Earned run average: 7.25
- Strikeouts: 45
- Stats at Baseball Reference

Teams
- Tohoku Rakuten Golden Eagles (2014–2018); Yokohama DeNA BayStars (2019–2020)

Kodai Hamaya (濱矢 廣大, Hamaya Kōdai; born February 27, 1993) is a Japanese professional baseball pitcher for the Mid East Falcons of Baseball United. He has previously played in Nippon Professional Baseball (NPB) for the Tohoku Rakuten Golden Eagles and Yokohama DeNA BayStars.

== Career ==
=== Tohoku Rakuten Golden Eagles ===
The Tohoku Rakuten Golden Eagles selected Hamaya with their third round selection in the 2013 Nippon Professional Baseball draft. Hamaya spent the majority of the 2014 season with the farm team, posting a 2.83 ERA in 12 games. On September 28, 2014, Hamaya made his NPB debut.

In 2015, Hamaya made 8 appearances for Rakuten, posting a 7.20 ERA with 14 strikeouts in 10.0 innings pitched. The following season, Hamaya struggled to a 10.24 ERA in 13 appearances with the main club. In 2017, Hamaya played in 7 games with the Eagles, pitching to a 5.19 ERA with 8 strikeouts in 8.2 innings. Hamaya spent the majority of the 2018 season with the farm team, and logged a 3.72 ERA with 8 strikeouts in 9.2 innings of work across 7 appearances with the main team.

=== Yokohama DeNA BayStars ===
On March 26, 2019, Hamaya was traded to the Yokohama DeNA BayStars in exchange for Kento Kumabara. Hamaya spent the majority of the year with Yokohama's farm team, and struggled to a 32.40 ERA in 2 games with the main club. In 2020, Hamaya pitched in 18 games for the BayStars, recording a 3.60 ERA with 18 strikeouts in 25 innings of work. On December 2, 2020, he became a free agent.

=== Ibaraki Astro Planets ===
On February 8, 2021, Hamaya signed with the Ibaraki Astro Planets of the Baseball Challenge League.

=== El Águila de Veracruz ===
On July 19, 2021, Hamaya’s contract was purchased by El Águila de Veracruz of the Mexican League. In 3 games (2 starts) for Veracruz, he logged a 1-1 record and 4.05 ERA with 24 strikeouts across 13 1/3 innings pitched. Hamaya was released by the team on January 19, 2022.

=== Nettuno Baseball Club ===
On March 17, 2022, Hamaya announced that he had signed with the Nettuno Baseball Club of the Italian Baseball League. In 10 games (6 starts) for Nettuno, he posted an 0-2 record and 3.49 ERA with 33 strikeouts across 28 1/3 innings pitched. Hamaya became a free agent following the season.

=== Mid East Falcons ===
In October 2025, Hamaya signed with the Mid East Falcons of Baseball United.
