= Daiki Tohmei =

Japanese baseball player

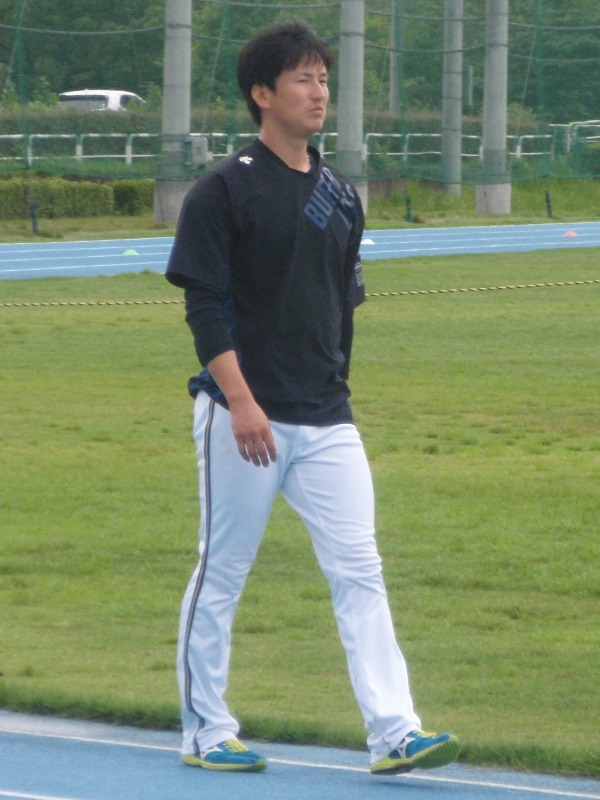

Free Agent
- Pitcher
- Born: June 15, 1989 (age 37); Gifu, Gifu, Japan
- Bats: Right Throws: Right

NPB debut
- March 28, 2014, for the Orix Buffaloes

NPB statistics (through 2020 season)
- Win–loss record: 18–30
- Earned run average: 3.97
- Strikeouts: 337
- Holds: 1
- Saves: 0
- Stats at Baseball Reference

Teams
- Orix Buffaloes (2014–2020)

Daiki Tohmei (東明 大貴, Tōmei Daiki; born June 15, 1989) is a Japanese baseball pitcher who is currently a free agent. He has played in Nippon Professional Baseball (NPB) for the Orix Buffaloes.

== Career ==
Orix Buffaloes selected Tohmei with the second selection in the 2013 Nippon Professional Baseball draft.

On March 29, 2014, Tohmei made his NPB debut.

On December 2, 2020, he become a free agent.
