= Kazuto Taguchi =

Japanese baseball player (born 1995)

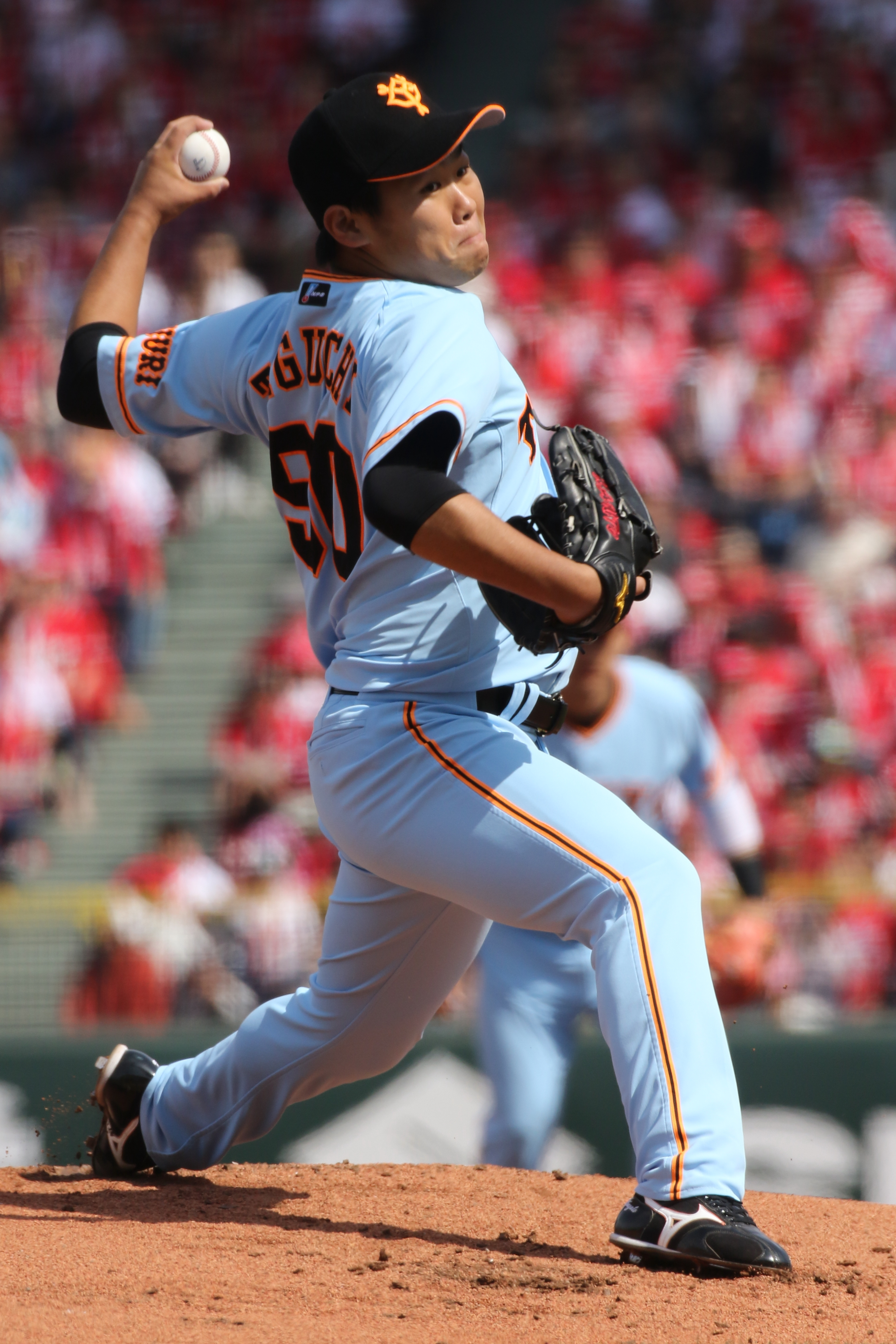
- Taguchi with the Yomiuri Giants

Tokyo Yakult Swallows – No. 34
- Pitcher
- Born: September 14, 1995 (age 30); Hiroshima, Hiroshima, Japan
- Bats: Left Throws: Left

NPB debut
- April 11, 2015, for the Yomiuri Giants

Career statistics (through 2025 season)
- Win–loss record: 47–57
- Earned run average: 3.32
- Strikeouts: 710
- Stats at Baseball Reference

Teams
- Yomiuri Giants (2014–2020); Tokyo Yakult Swallows (2021–present)

Career highlights and awards
- Japan Series champion (2021); NPB All-Star (2023)
Medals
Men's baseball
Representing Japan
18U Baseball World Cup
Silver medal – second place	2013 Taichung	Team
WBSC Premier12
Gold medal – first place	2019 Tokyo	Team

Kazuto Taguchi (田口 麗斗, Taguchi Kazuto; born September 14, 1995) is a Japanese professional baseball pitcher for the Tokyo Yakult Swallows of Nippon Professional Baseball (NPB). He has previously played in NPB for the Yomiuri Giants.

== Professional career ==
=== Yomiuri Giants ===
On October 24, 2013, Taguchi was drafted by the Yomiuri Giants in the 2013 Nippon Professional Baseball draft.

On April 11, 2015, He debuted in the Central League against the Tokyo Yakult Swallows, and recorded his first win.

On November 16, 2018, he was selected Yomiuri Giants roster at the 2018 MLB Japan All-Star Series exhibition game against MLB All-Stars. On February 27, 2019, he was selected for Japan national baseball team at the 2019 exhibition games against Mexico. On October 1, 2019, he was selected at the 2019 WBSC Premier12.

=== Tokyo Yakult Swallows ===
On March 1, 2021, Taguchi was traded to the Tokyo Yakult Swallows.
