= Ayumu Ishikawa =

Japanese baseball player (born 1988)

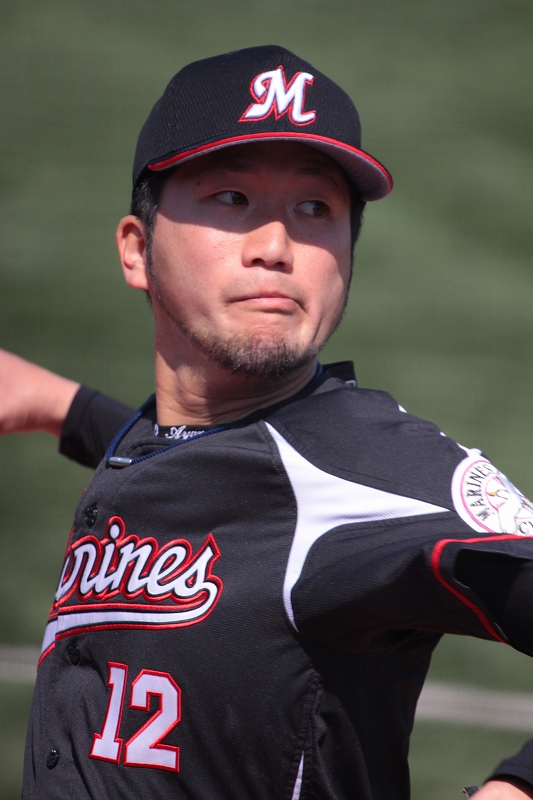

Twins Oosterhout – No. 12
- Pitcher
- Born: April 11, 1988 (age 38)
- Bats: Right Throws: Right

NPB debut
- March 30, 2014, for the Chiba Lotte Marines

NPB statistics (through December 13, 2025)
- Win–loss record: 79-66
- ERA: 3.49
- Strikeouts: 769
- Stats at Baseball Reference

Teams
- Chiba Lotte Marines (2014–2025)

Career highlights and awards
- Pacific League Rookie of the Year (2014); 2× NPB All-Star (2016, 2018); Interleague play PL Nippon Life Award Winner (2018)

Ayumu Ishikawa (石川 歩, Ishikawa Ayumu; born April 11, 1988) is a Japanese professional baseball pitcher for the Twins Oosterhout of the Netherlands' Honkbal Hoofdklasse. He previously played for the Chiba Lotte Marines in Japan's Nippon Professional Baseball.

== Career ==
=== Amateur Days ===
Ishikawa did not attract attention from NPB scouts upon graduation from Chubu University in 2011 despite posting a 0.69 ERA and 1.27 ERA in the 2010 Spring and Fall seasons, respectively. He joined the industrial league team for Tokyo Gas in 2011 and developed into a top prospect over his three years with the team. NPB draft observers highly rated Ishikawa's chances for being drafted early at the 2013 Nippon Professional Baseball draft, and indeed he was selected by both the Yomiuri Giants and Chiba Lotte Marines with the first round draft pick. Lotte manager Tsutomu Ito selected the winning card in the subsequent lottery, and Ishikawa joined the Marines for the 2014 season.

=== Professional career ===
In 2014, Ishikawa began his rookie campaign in the Lotte starting rotation and made an immediate impact, throwing quality starts in 4 of his first 5 games (missing the 5th by just one out) and finishing his first professional month with 3 wins and a 1.19 ERA. His pace slowed a bit from that torrid start as the season progressed, but his season total of 10 wins, 3.43 ERA, and 1.26 WHIP led Lotte's starting rotation in all three categories. He was recognized as the Pacific League Rookie of the Year in 2014.

In 2015, Ishikawa continued to shine, following up his impressive rookie season with another year with double-digit wins (12), becoming the first Lotte pitcher in 64 years to record back-to-back double digit win seasons to start his career. That win total would have been even higher were it not for extremely poor run support throughout the summer months, including being on the losing end of shutout losses three times despite throwing a quality start in all three games.

In 2018, he was selected to the 2018 NPB All-Star game.

Ishikawa announced his retirement from NPB following the 2025 season. He was offered a coaching role to stay with the Marines but decided instead to sign with the Twins Oosterhout of the Netherlands' Honkbal Hoofdklasse.

== Trivia ==
Was given the nickname "Lotte's Goemon" in his rookie season, and the team sold special T-shirts with that nickname.
