= Daichi Osera =

Japanese baseball player (born 1991)

Daichi Ohsera
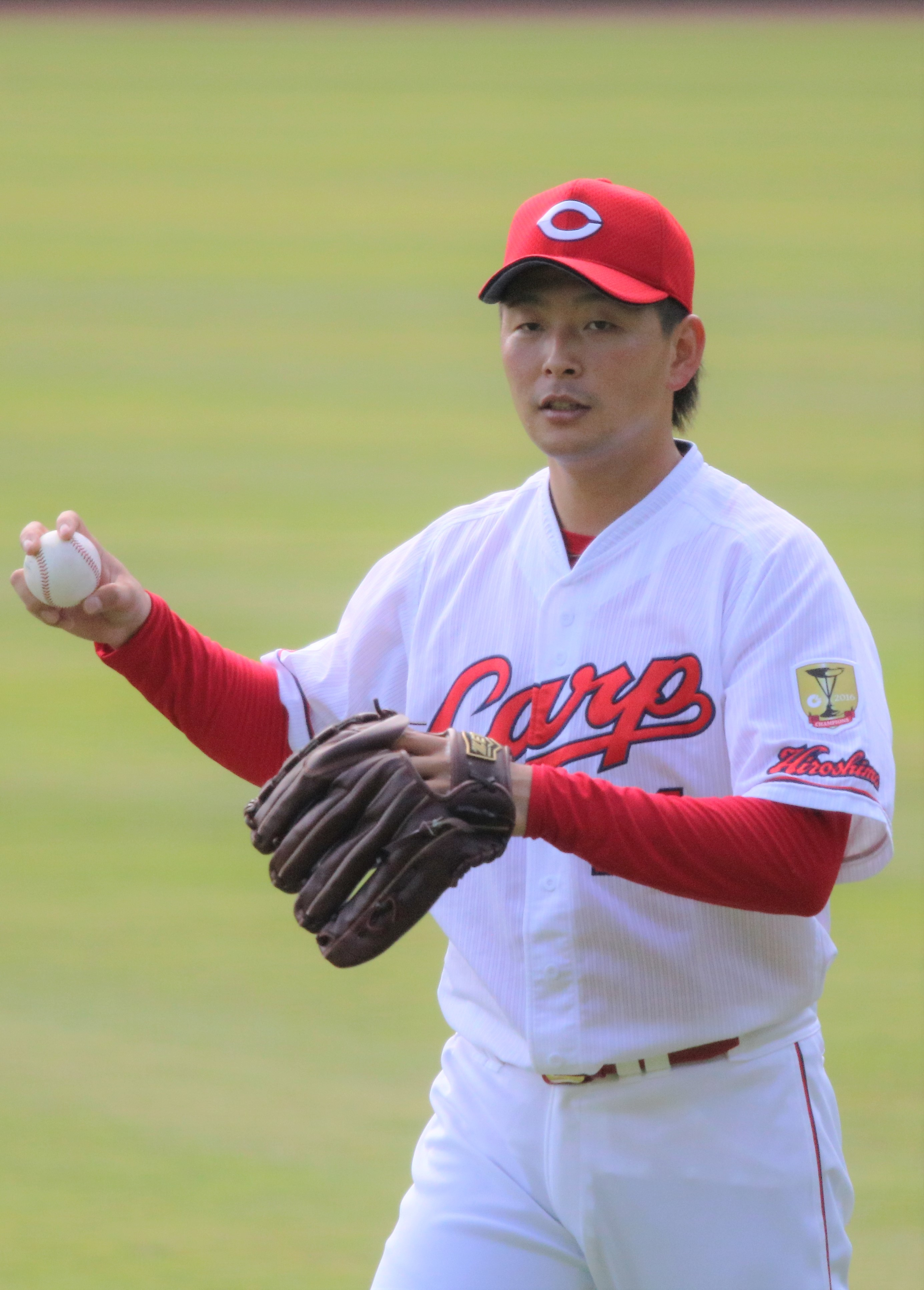
- Ohsera with the Hiroshima Toyo Carp

Hiroshima Toyo Carp – No. 14
- Pitcher
- Born: June 17, 1991 (age 35); Ōmura, Nagasaki
- Bats: Right Throws: Right

NPB debut
- April 2, 2014, for the Hiroshima Toyo Carp

NPB statistics (through 2025 season)
- Win–loss record: 94-79
- Earned run average: 3.38
- Strikeouts: 1,167
- Stats at Baseball Reference

Teams
- Hiroshima Toyo Carp (2014–present)

Career highlights and awards
- 2014 Central League Rookie of the Year; Central League wins champion (2018); 3× NPB All-Star (2018–2019, 2024); Pitched a no-hitter on June 7, 2024

Daichi Ohsera (大瀬良 大地, Ōsera Daichi; born June 17, 1991) is a Japanese professional baseball pitcher for the Hiroshima Toyo Carp of Nippon Professional Baseball (NPB). He was the Carp's top pick in the 2013 autumn draft.

== Career ==
=== Early baseball career ===
Daichi started playing baseball when he was in 4th grade in Kokubu Nishi Elementary School in Kagoshima. He transferred to Sakuragahara Junior High in Nagasaki where he joined its softball club. Due to an injury to his right arm when he was in grade school, however, he pitched with his left arm until his 3rd year when he was finally able to undergo surgery.

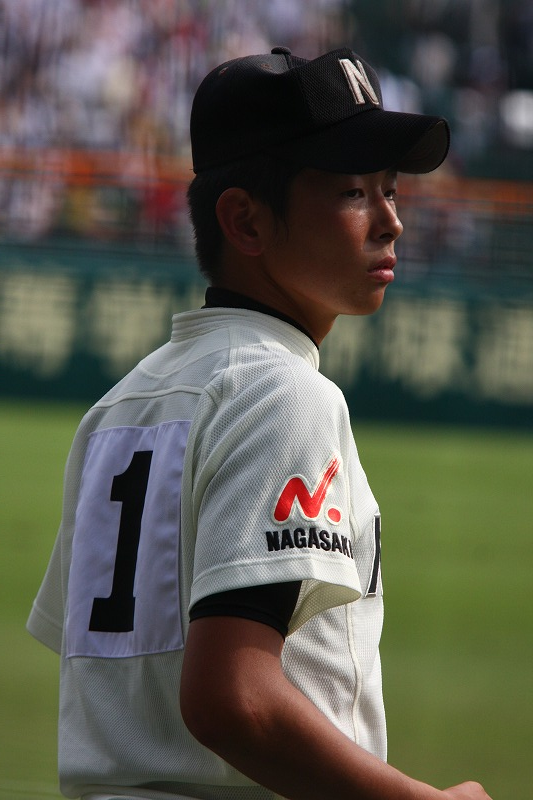
August 2009, 91st Summer Koshien

He then entered Nagasaki Nihon University Junior and Senior High School, where he continued to play as a pitcher. During the quarter-finals of the Nagasaki prefectural tournament in his junior year, he battled with soon-to-be Carp teammate Takeru Imamura of Nagasaki Prefectural Seiho High School, where he pitched a complete game, giving up only 4 hits and one run, and earned the win with a 3-1 score. His team then defeated Sohseikan High school, and proceeded to compete in the Summer Koshien. During the first round match with Hanamaki Higashi High School, however, despite having pitched 5 scoreless innings, he lost to pitcher Yusei Kikuchi (now with the Seibu Lions).

After graduation, he chose to enter Kyushu Kyoritsu University instead of joining the 2009 draft, wanting to be under the guidance of Coach Sei Nakazato who was responsible for rearing notable NPB pitchers such as Nagisa Arakaki and Takahiro Mahara. He took up sports science, and was tasked to further develop his thin upper-body build. Within four years, he was assigned to do pilates workouts, then moved on to full-fledged weight training, making him gain an additional 14 kg.

In the Autumn 2010 Fukuoka Big 6 Baseball Tournament, he obtained a 5-0 win–loss record and a 0.63 ERA, which contributed greatly to his team's championship. He was selected as one of the Best 9, and was given the league's Rookie Award. In his sophomore year, he was given the Most Valuable Player Award in the summer tournament, and Best 9 and MVP award again in the autumn. His team won the championship for both seasons.

In 2011, their team won the Kyushu Tournament championships, but was defeated by Sōka University's Yasuhiro Ogawa in the second round of the Meiji Jingu Tournament, despite Ohsera having delivered 159 pitches in 9 innings and 10 KOs. Later on during the off-season, he was quoted saying he wanted to have a re-match with Ogawa, and that this defeat was his motivation for training harder.

In 2012, he again won the MVP and Best 9 awards, and his team championed again in Fukuoka League's summer and fall tournaments. Then finally, his wish for a rematch came true in June during the quarter-finals of the 61st Japan National Collegiate Baseball Championship. True to his word, he pitched a winning shut-out game, giving up only 3 hits, and delivered eight 151 km/h pitches. They were, however, defeated by Waseda University in the next leg. He was elected as team captain in his senior year. In all his 57 league games, he went 38-5, with an ERA of 1.07.

=== Hiroshima Toyo Carp ===
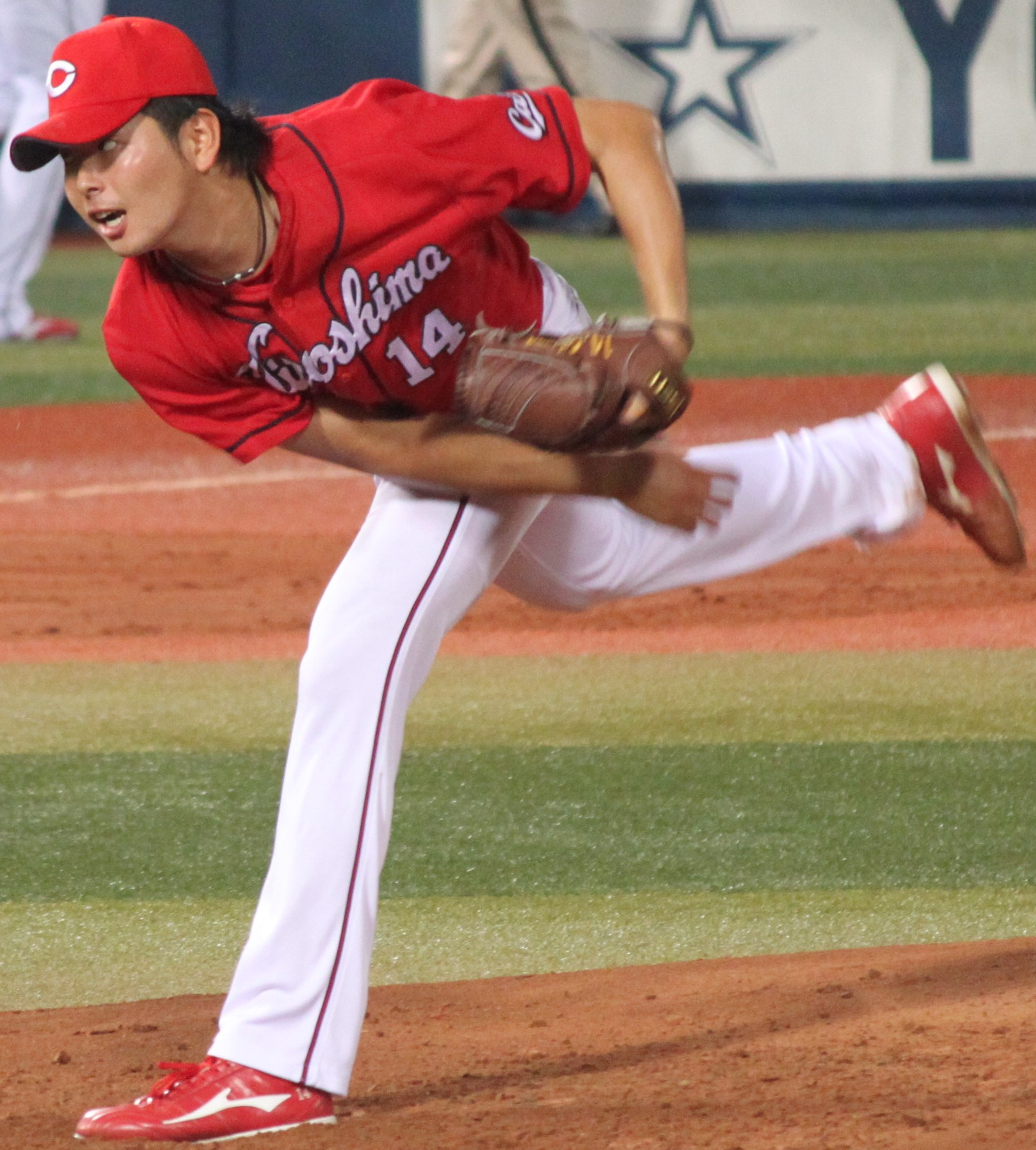
Pitching Form 9-6-2014, Yokohama Stadium

During the 2013 autumn draft, he was chosen as the first pick of three teams: Hiroshima Toyo Carp, Hanshin Tigers, and the Tokyo Yakult Swallows. Hiroshima won the draw and consequent bargaining rights. In November 16, he signed a 100 million yen contract with Hiroshima plus a 50 million yen signing bonus, for an estimated annual salary of 15 million yen. He was given the jersey no. 14.

In 2014, he started the February 22 exhibition game with the Tigers, and pitched 2 scoreless innings. He recorded his first official win on the April 2 game against the Swallows, and along with Allen Kuri, the Carps became the first Central League team to field two first-year rookies that recorded victories in their first career starts in the same season since Yomiuri in 1960 (Ritsuo Horimoto and Hiroaki Aoki). On May 1, he pitched his first complete game against the Hanshin Tigers at Koshien, allowing only eight hits and two walks, while striking out seven, beating fellow rookie Suguru Iwazaki. He extended his personal winning streak to five games on May 16 to become the sixth Hiroshima rookie to win five or more in a row, since Hiroshi Nagadomi won six straight starts in 1985. He also became the fourth pitcher in franchise history to win five or more games before the end of May, and the only one of the four to record all five victories as a starter.

He finished the season at 10-8 with a 4.05 ERA and 115 strikeouts in 26 appearances, and became the first rookie in franchise history to win ten or more games in their first year since Toshikazu Sawazaki won twelve in 1997.

During postseason, he pitched 7 shutout innings in the second game against the Tigers in the first stage of the climax series. The game ended in a scoreless draw; however, Hanshin advanced to the final stage since they won the first game, and ties were awarded to the team with the better season record. This was the second Climax Series game that ended in a tie (the first that ended in a 0-0 tie).

In November, he was named the Central League Rookie of the Year.

He selected 2018 NPB All-Star game.

== International Baseball Career ==
In July 2011, he was selected to participate in the USA College Baseball Championships, where he wore the jersey no. 14 and participated in two games. He was again selected in 2012.

He was also a member of the national team (Samurai Japan) for the 2012 Asian Baseball Championship Tournament, where Japan triumphed for the fifth consecutive time. He struck out 9 consecutive batters in 3 innings during the second leg match against Pakistan.

In November, he became the winning pitcher during the second game of the 2013 Baseball Challenge vs Chinese Taipei held in Taiwan. His jersey was sold for 378,000 yen through a Samurai Japan Charity Auction, where proceeds were given to tsunami relief/reconstruction efforts in the Philippines via the Japan Red Cross Society.

On October 10, 2018, he was selected at the 2018 MLB Japan All-Star Series.
