= Takuma Achira =

Japanese baseball player (born 1992)

Takuma Achira 阿知羅拓馬
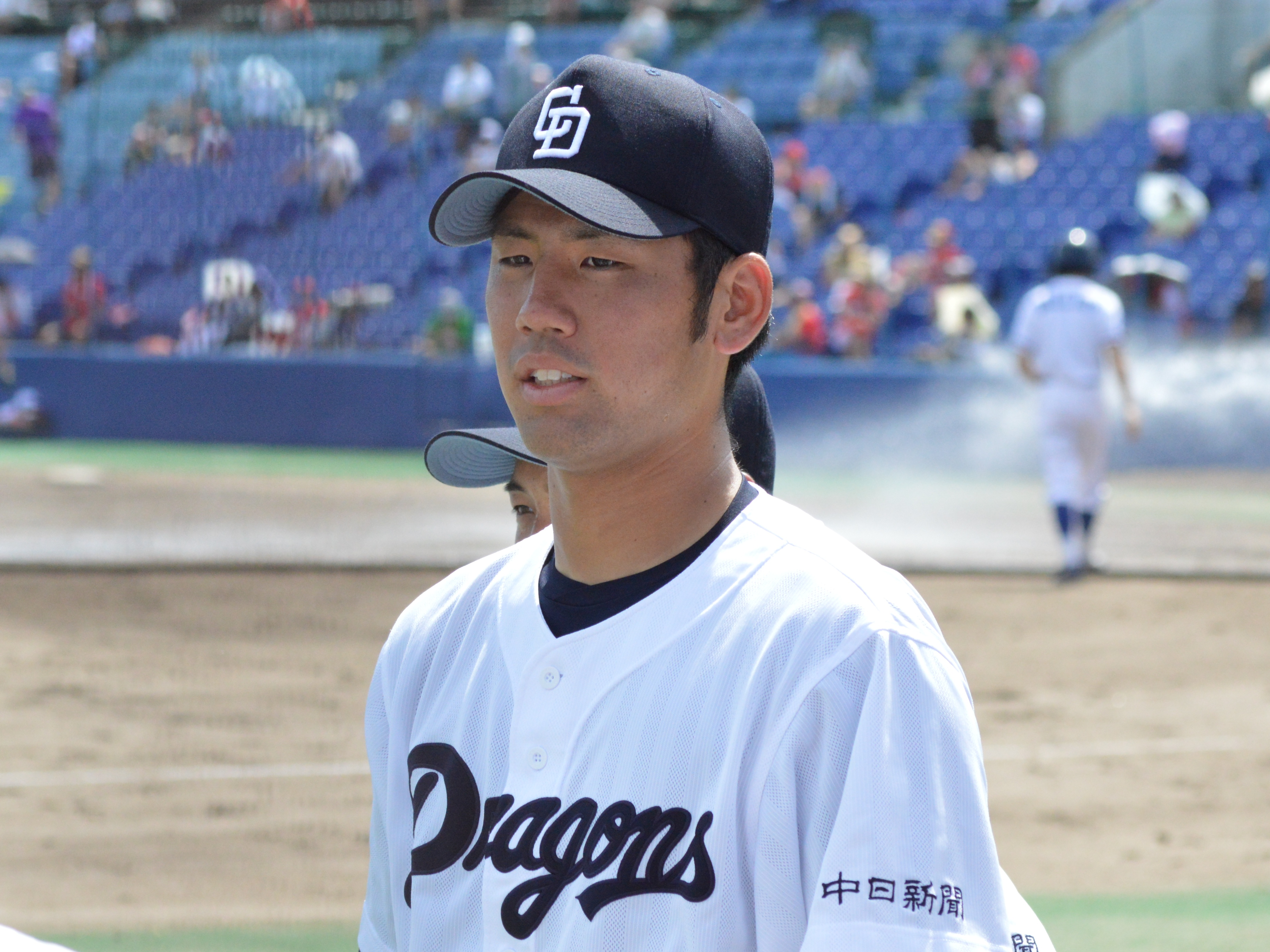
- Pitcher
- Born: November 20, 1992 (age 33); Osaka, Osaka, Japan
- Batted: Right Threw: Right

debut
- April 27, 2016, for the Chunichi Dragons

Last NPB appearance
- September 12, 2020, for the Chunichi Dragons

NPB statistics (through 2020 season)
- Win–loss: 1–4
- ERA: 4.84
- Strikeouts: 43

Teams
- Chunichi Dragons (2014–2020)

Takuma Achira (阿知羅 拓馬, Achira Takuma; born November 20, 1992 in Osaka, Japan) is a Japanese former professional baseball pitcher. He has played in Nippon Professional Baseball (NPB) for the Chunichi Dragons.

== Career ==
Chunichi Dragons selected Achira with the forth selection in the 2013 Nippon Professional Baseball draft.

On April 27, 2016, he made his NPB debut.

After the 2020 season, he announced his retirement.
