= Yūri Furukawa =

Japanese baseball player (born 1995)

Yuri Furukawa
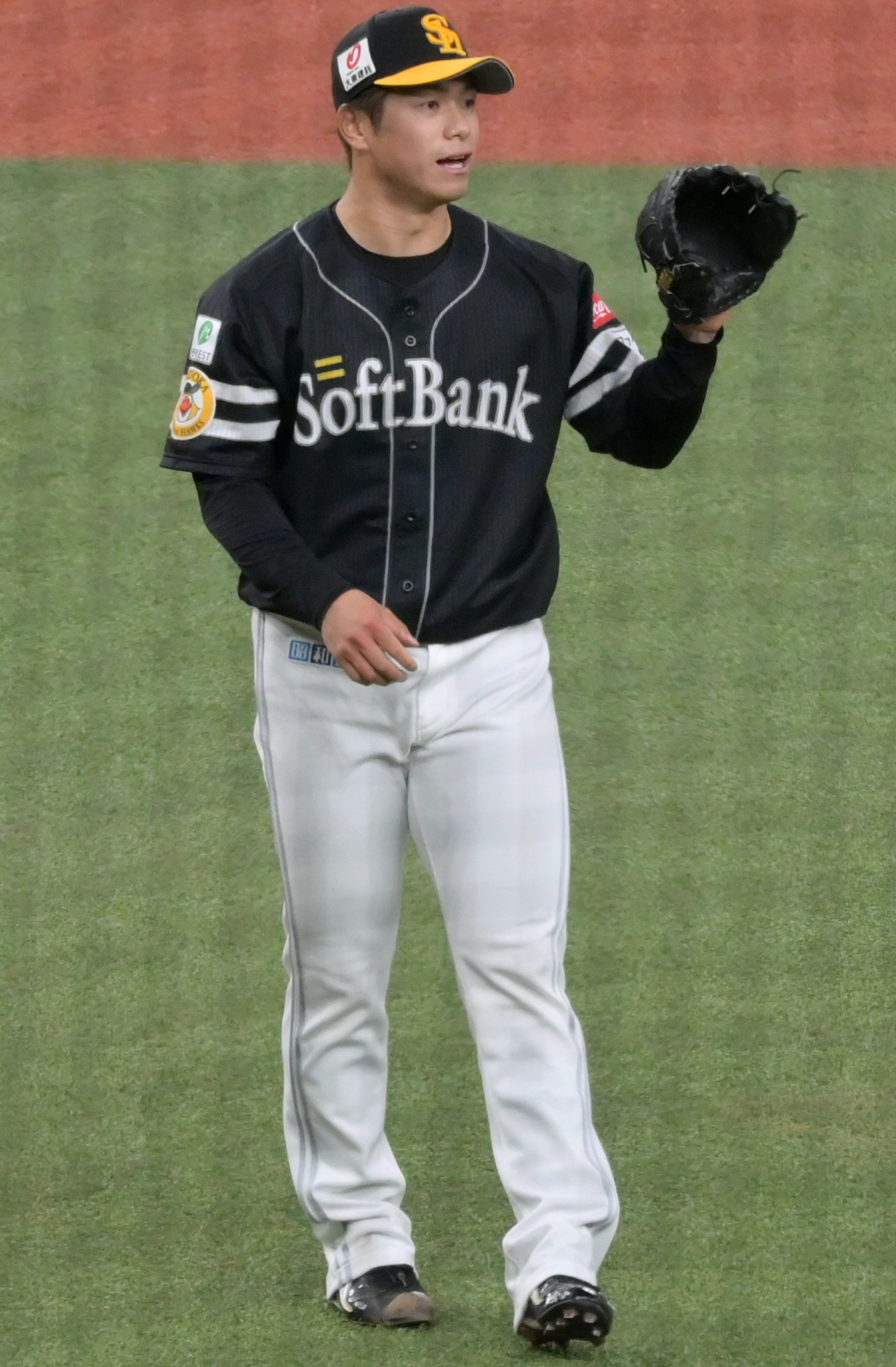
- Furukawa with the Fukuoka SoftBank Hawks.
- Pitcher
- Born: September 8, 1995 (age 29); Takeo, Saga, Japan
- Batted: Right Threw: Right

NPB debut
- September 14, 2014, for the Tohoku Rakuten Golden Eagles

Last NPB appearance
- August 29, 2023, for the Fukuoka SoftBank Hawks

NPB statistics (through 2023 season)
- Win–loss record: 6-15
- ERA: 4.97
- Holds: 3
- Saves: 0
- Strikeouts: 184

Teams
- Tohoku Rakuten Golden Eagles (2014-2019); Yomiuri Giants (2019–2021); Hokkaido Nippon-Ham Fighters (2022); Fukuoka SoftBank Hawks (2023-2024)

Yuri Furukawa (古川 侑利, Furukawa Yūri; born September 8, 1995) is a professional Japanese professional baseball pitcher for the Fukuoka SoftBank Hawks of Nippon Professional Baseball (NPB).

He previously played for the Tohoku Rakuten Golden Eagles, the Yomiuri Giants, and the Hokkaido Nippon-Ham Fighters.

== Early baseball career ==
Furukawa went to Arita Technical High School, and when he was in his third year, the school participated in the Japanese High School Baseball Championship for the first time in 114 years since its founding, winning the school's first game.

== Professional career ==
=== Tohoku Rakuten Golden Eagles ===
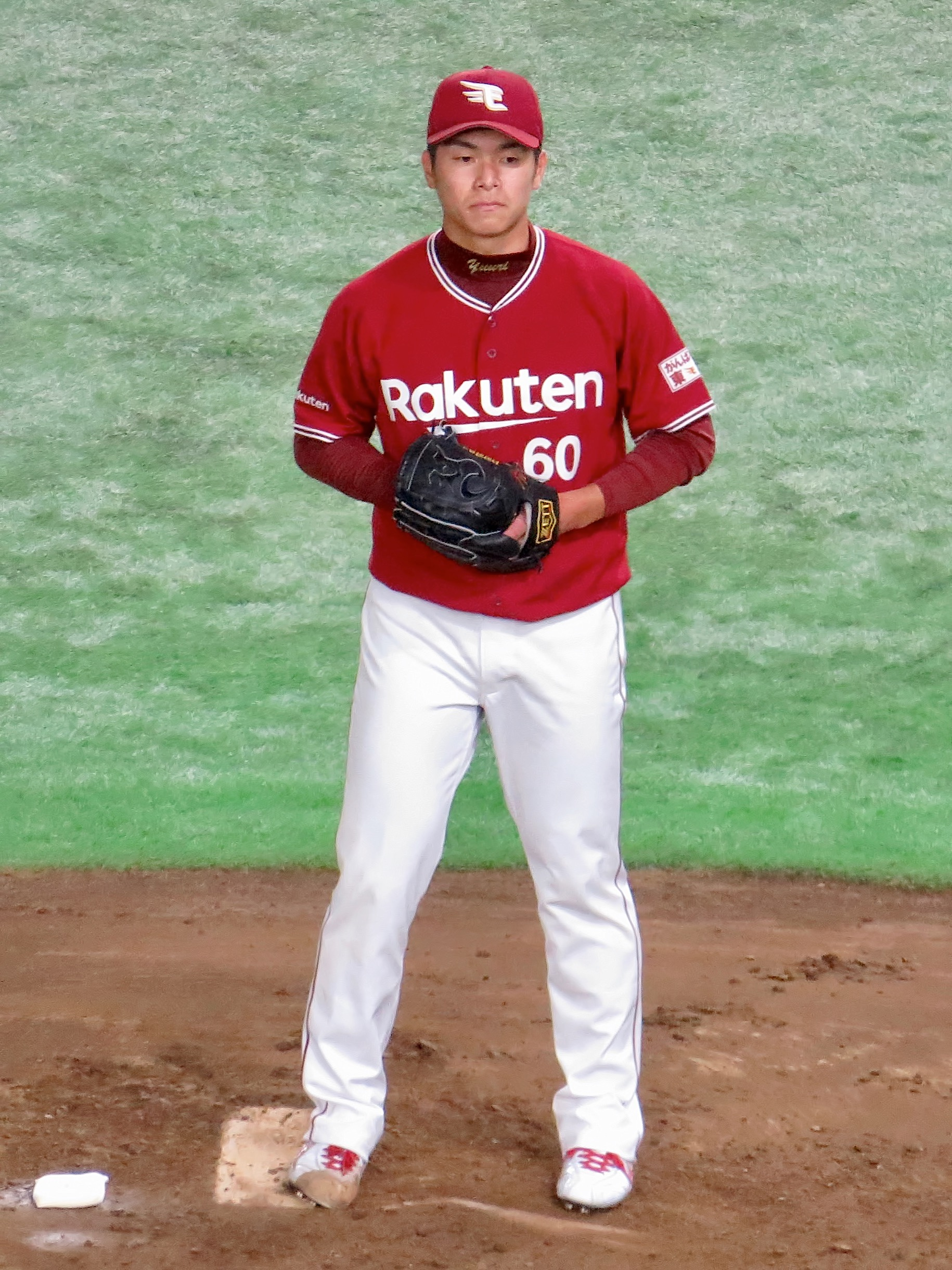
Furukawa with the Tohoku Rakuten Golden Eagles.

On October 24, 2013, Furukawa was drafted fourth round pick by the Tohoku Rakuten Golden Eagles in the 2013 Nippon Professional Baseball draft.

On September 14, 2014, Furukawa pitched his debut game against the Saitama Seibu Lions as a relief pitcher.

In 2015 season, He injured his right shoulder in spring training and spent the season rehabbing the effects.

In 2016 season, he pitched in 6 game in the Pacific League.

In the 2017 season, Furukawa pitched as a starting pitcher, and on October 5, against the Chiba Lotte Marines, he recorded a complete game, although he did not win.

On June 5, 2018, in an interleague play against the Yomiuri Giants, Furukawa became a winning pitcher for the first time in his fifth season since the start of his career. And he finished the regular season with a 18 Games pitched, a 4–9 Win–loss record, a 4.13 ERA, a 77 strikeouts in 98 innings.

=== Yomiuri Giants ===
On July 7, 2019, Furukawa was traded to the Yomiuri Giants exchange to Ren Wada.

In 2019 season, He finished the regular season with a 11 Games pitched, a 2–3 Win–loss record, a 6.44 ERA, a 41 strikeouts in 43.1 innings for both teams combined.

In 2020-2021 season, he pitched only 5 games in the Central League.

On November 28, 2021, the Giants announced the release of Furukawa.

=== Hokkaido Nippon-Ham Fighters ===
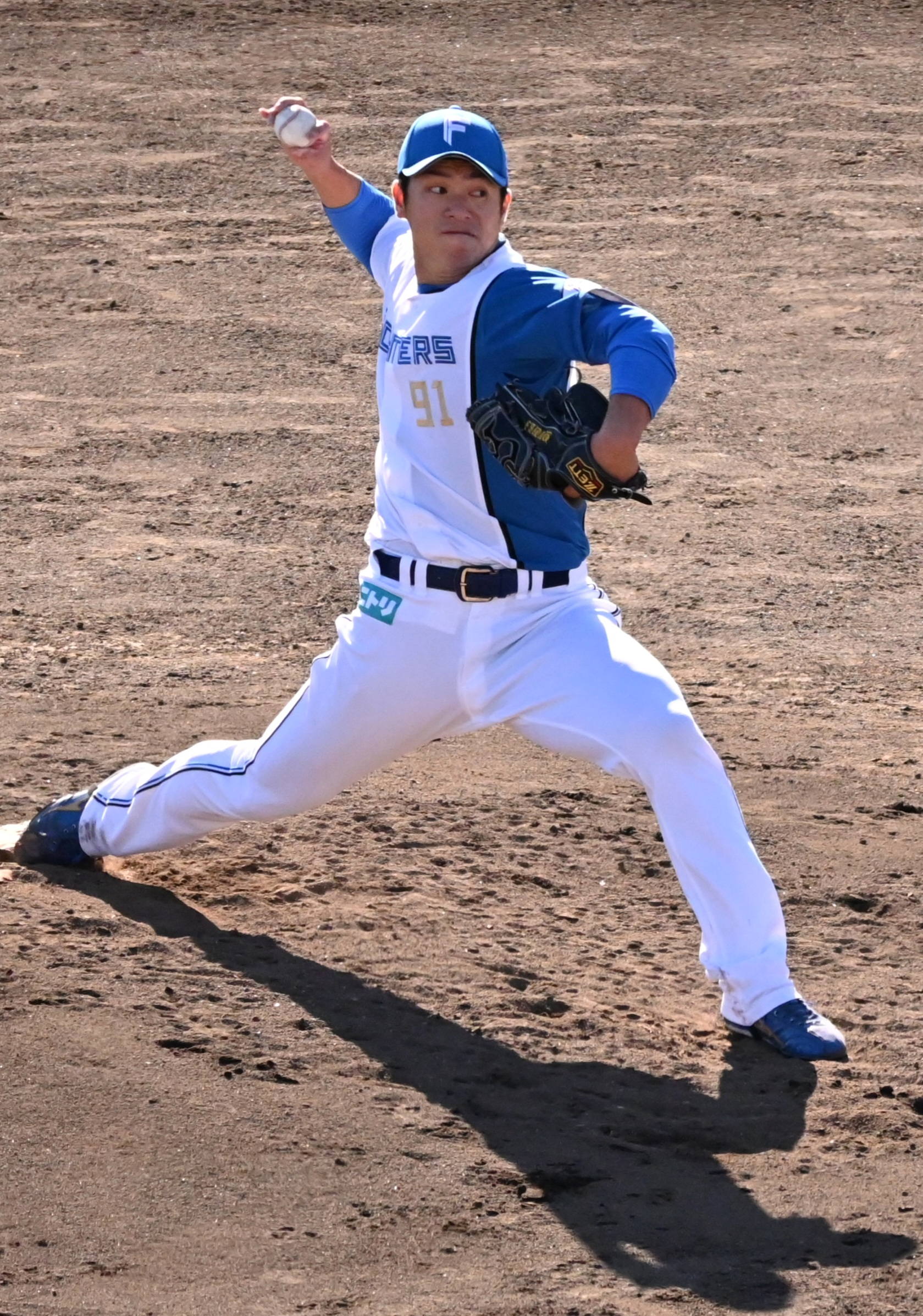
Furukawa with the Hokkaido Nippon-Ham Fighters

On December 13, 2021, Furukawa signed him as a developmental player with the Hokkaido Nippon-Ham Fighters, an estimated salary of 5.5 million yen.

On March 20, 2022, the Eagles re-signed him as a registered player under control, an estimated salary of 7.5 million yen.

In 2022 season, he finished the regular season with a 34 Games pitched, a 0–1 Win–loss record, a 3 holds, a 4.08 ERA, a 32 strikeouts in 35.1 innings as a relief pitcher.

=== Fukuoka SoftBank Hawks ===
On December 9, 2022, NPB held its first Active player draft, and Furukawa was selected by the Fukuoka SoftBank Hawks and transferred.

In 2023 season, he pitched in nine games as a relief pitcher.

On November 18, 2023, the Hawks announced that they had re-signed Furukawa as a developmental player.
