= Seiji Kobayashi =

Japanese baseball player (born 1989)

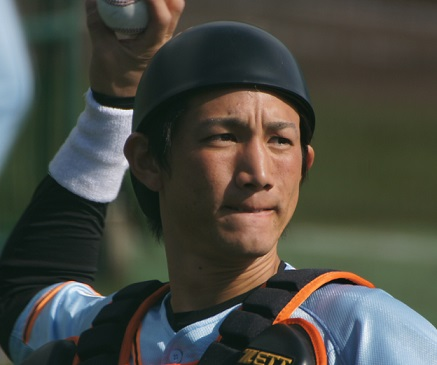
- Kobayashi with the Yomiuri Giants

Yomiuri Giants – No. 22
- Catcher
- Born: June 7, 1989 (age 37); Sakai, Osaka, Japan
- Bats: Right Throws: Right

NPB debut
- March 24, 2014, for the Yomiuri Giants

NPB statistics (through 2023 season)
- Batting average: .208
- Hits: 359
- Home runs: 15
- Runs batted in: 142
- Stats at Baseball Reference

Teams
- Yomiuri Giants (2014–present)

Career highlights and awards
- 1× Mitsui Golden Glove Award (2017); 3× NPB All-Star (2017, 2018, 2022)
Medals
Men's baseball
Representing Japan
WBSC Premier12
Gold medal – first place	2019 Tokyo	Team

Seiji Kobayashi (小林 誠司; born June 7, 1989) is a Japanese professional baseball catcher for the Yomiuri Giants of Nippon Professional Baseball (NPB).

== Career ==
Kobayashi attended Doshisha University, where he played for the school's baseball team. The Yomiuri Giants selected Kobayashi in the 2013 Nippon Professional Baseball draft.

In 2018, he was selected 2018 NPB All-Star game.

== International career ==
Kobayashi represented the Japan national baseball team in the 2014 MLB Japan All-Star Series, 2015 exhibition games against Europe, 2017 World Baseball Classic, 2019 exhibition games against Mexico and 2019 WBSC Premier12.

And also, on November 16, 2018, he was selected Yomiuri Giants roster at the 2018 MLB Japan All-Star Series exhibition game against MLB All-Stars.
