= Yusuke Nishimiya =

Japanese baseball player

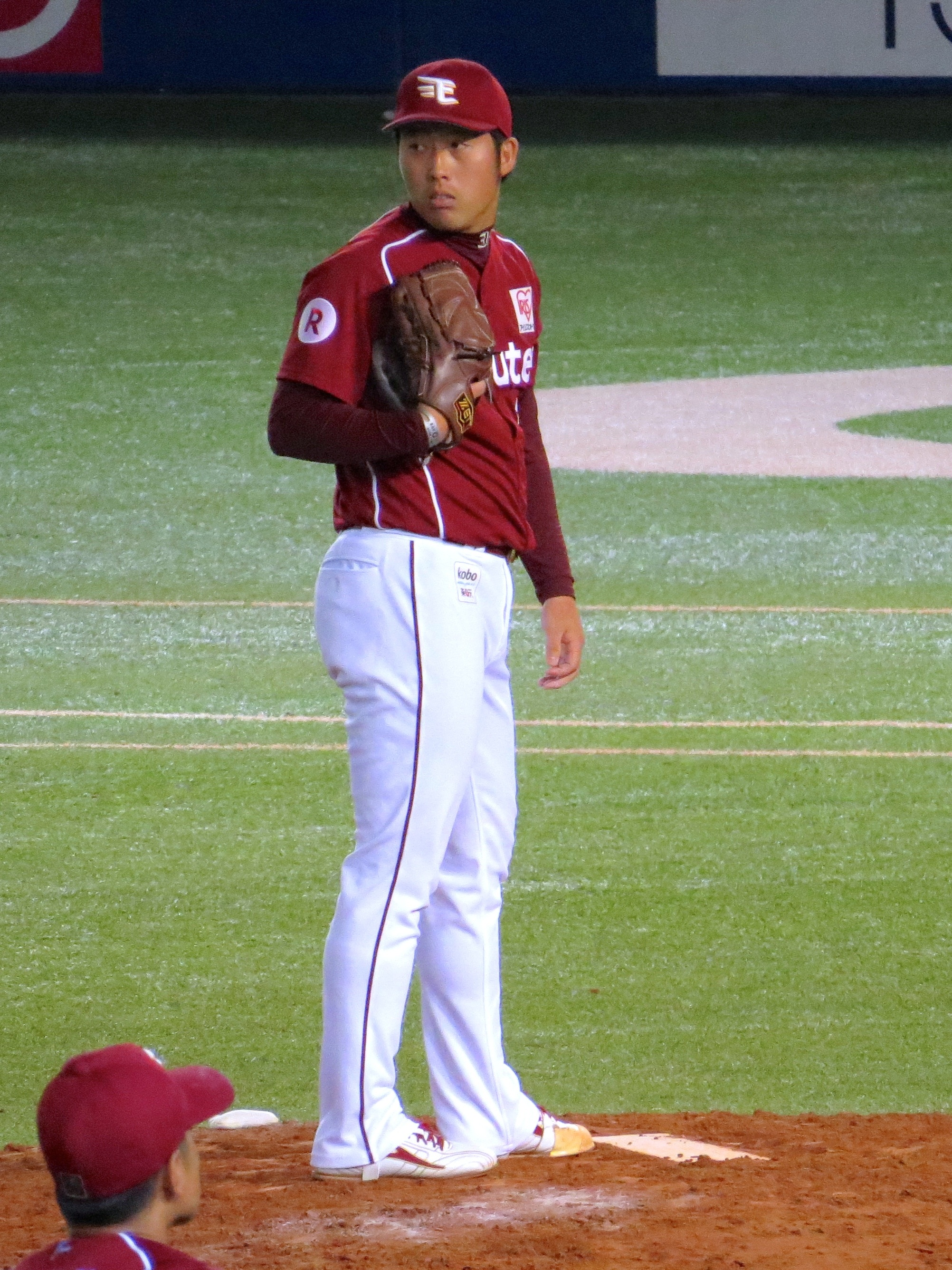
- Nishimiya with the Tohoku Rakuten Golden Eagles
- Pitcher
- Born: May 1, 1991 (age 34)
- Bats: Left Throws: Left

NPB debut
- 2014, for the Tohoku Rakuten Golden Eagles

NPB statistics (through 2016)
- Win–loss record: 9-1
- ERA: 4.60
- Strikeouts: 132

Teams
- Tohoku Rakuten Golden Eagles (2014–2019)

Yusuke Nishimiya (西宮 悠介, Nishimiya Yūsuke; born May 1, 1991 in Tsuchiura, Ibaraki Prefecture) is a Japanese former professional baseball pitcher in Japan's Nippon Professional Baseball. He played for the Tohoku Rakuten Golden Eagles from 2014 to 2019.
