= Hiromi Oka =

Japanese baseball player (born 1991)

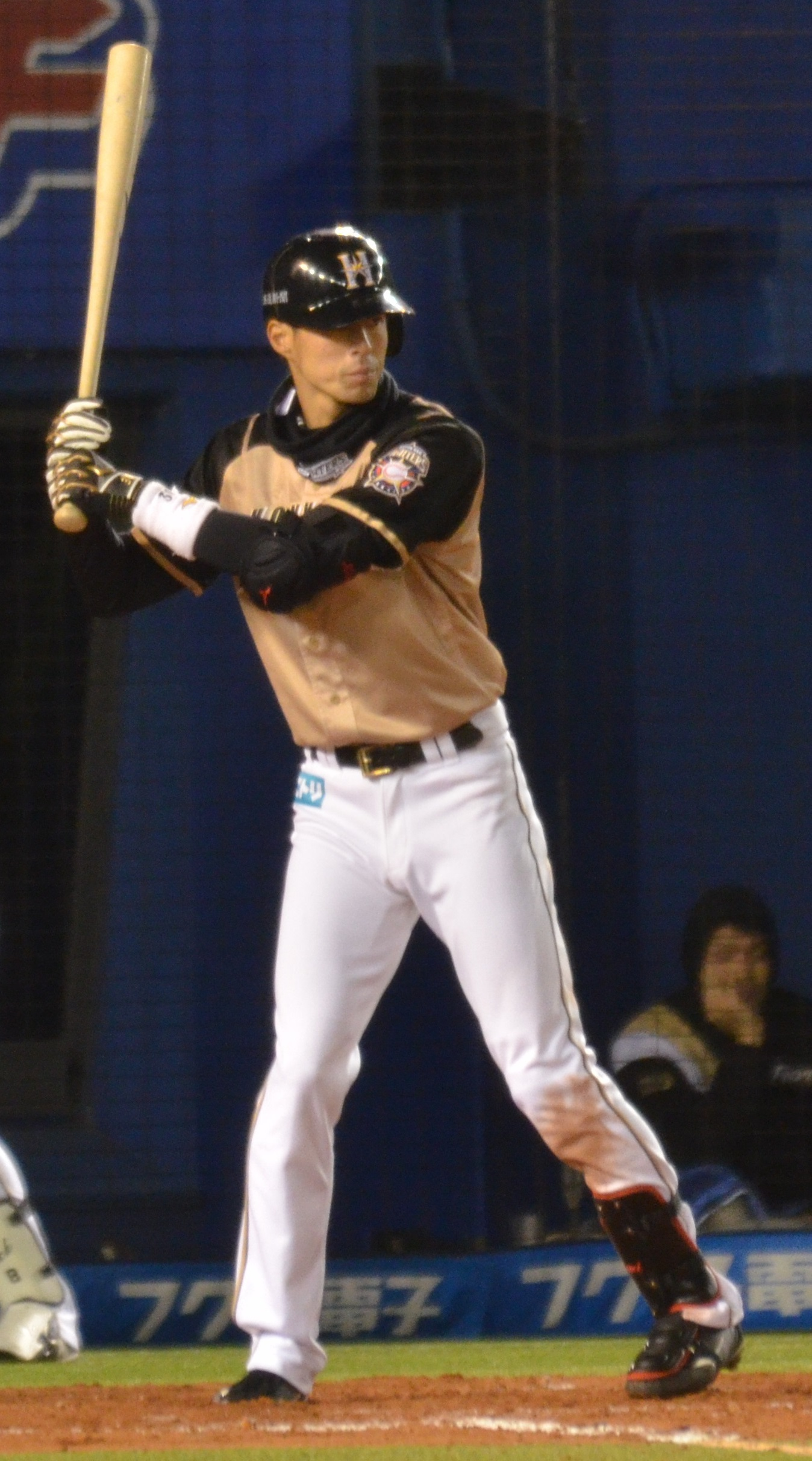

Chiba Lotte Marines – No. 25
- Outfielder
- Born: July 15, 1991 (age 34); Kurashiki, Okayama, Japan
- Bats: Right Throws: Right

NPB debut
- March 28, 2014, for the Hokkaido Nippon-Ham Fighters

NPB statistics (through July 21, 2024)
- Batting average: .244
- Home runs: 40
- Runs batted in: 179
- Stats at Baseball Reference

Teams
- Hokkaido Nippon-Ham Fighters (2014–2018); Chiba Lotte Marines (2018–present)

Career highlights and awards
- NPB All-Star (2024)

Hiromi Oka (岡 大海, Oka Hiromi; born July 15, 1991) is a Japanese professional baseball outfielder for the Chiba Lotte Marines in the Nippon Professional Baseball (NPB) league.
