= Masatoshi Okada =

Japanese baseball player (born 1989)

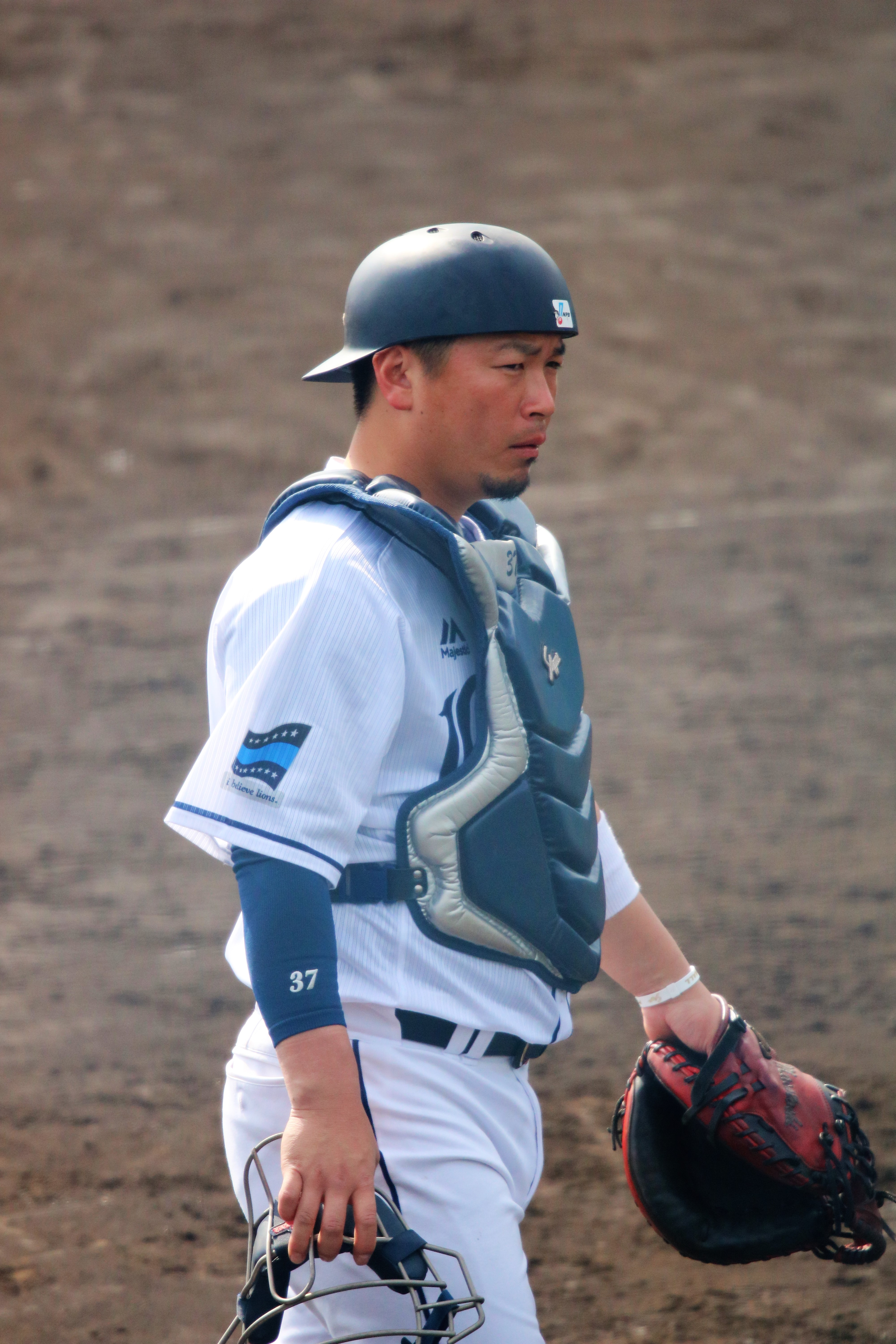

Saitama Seibu Lions – No. 92
- Catcher / Coach
- Born: June 30, 1989 (age 36)
- Batted: Right Threw: Right

NPB debut
- May 17, 2014, for the Saitama Seibu Lions

Last NPB appearance
- September 14, 2024, for the Saitama Seibu Lions

NPB statistics
- Batting average: .216
- Home runs: 6
- RBI: 40
- Stats at Baseball Reference

Teams
- As player: Saitama Seibu Lions (2014–2024); As coach: Saitama Seibu Lions (2026–present)

Masatoshi Okada (岡田 雅利, born June 30, 1989, in Nara, Nara) is a Japanese professional baseball catcher for the Saitama Seibu Lions in Japan's Nippon Professional Baseball.
