= Yuta Yoshida =

Japanese baseball player (born 1991)

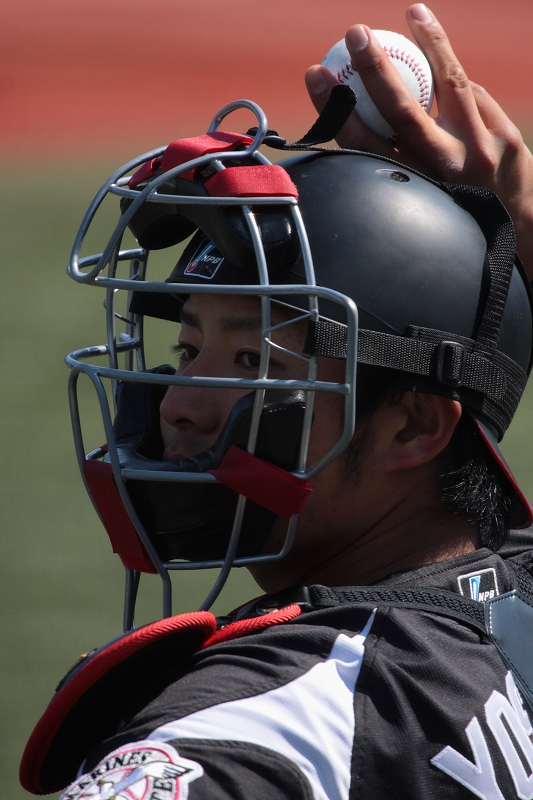
- Yoshida with the Chiba Lotte Marines
- Catcher
- Born: July 21, 1991 (age 34)
- Bats: Right Throws: Right

NPB debut
- March 28, 2014, for the Chiba Lotte Marines

NPB statistics (through 2021)
- Batting average: .191
- Home runs: 9
- RBI: 30
- Stats at Baseball Reference

Teams
- Chiba Lotte Marines (2014–2021)

Yuta Yoshida (吉田 裕太, Yoshida Yūta; born July 21, 1991 in Nagareyama) is a Japanese former professional baseball catcher. He played for the Chiba Lotte Marines in Japan's Nippon Professional Baseball from 2014 to 2021.
