= Yuta Iwasada =

Japanese baseball player (born 1991)

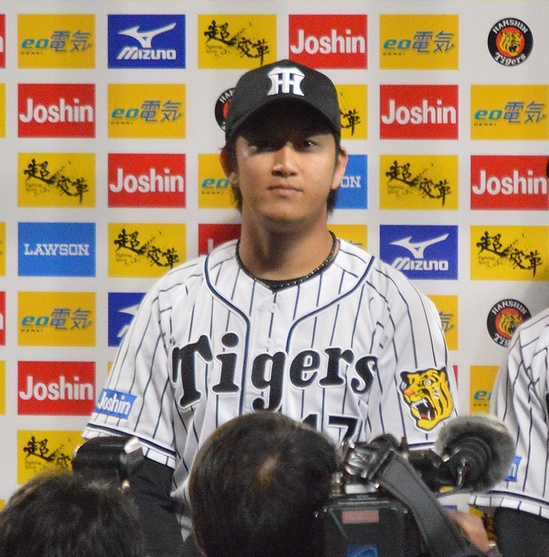

Hanshin Tigers – No. 14
- Pitcher
- Born: September 5, 1991 (age 34); Kumamoto City, Kumamoto, Japan
- Bats: Left Throws: Left

NPB debut
- August 10, 2014, for the Hanshin Tigers

Career statistics (through 2025 season)
- Games: 303
- Win–loss: 43-44
- Earned Run Average: 3.55
- Strikeouts: 624
- Saves: 0
- Holds: 59
- Stats at Baseball Reference

Teams
- Hanshin Tigers (2014–present)

Career highlights and awards
- 2× NPB All-Star (2016, 2018)

Yuta Iwasada (岩貞 祐太, Iwasada Yuta; born September 5, 1991 in Kumamoto City, Kumamoto) is a Japanese professional baseball pitcher for the Hanshin Tigers of Nippon Professional Baseball (NPB).

== Career ==
=== Early career ===
Yuta started his baseball career in 4th grade as an outfielder for the Wakaba Elementary School, and in 6th grade, made it to the semi-finals of a national baseball tournament. He doubled as 1st-base infielder and pitcher for the Kumamoto Hitsuyukan Senior High but his team never made it to nationals.

He entered the Yokohama College of Commerce, and in his sophomore year, was chosen to pitch for the national team for the US-Japan Collegiate Baseball Championships. In his senior year, he was awarded Best Nine in the Kanagawa University Baseball League after winning 6 games in the tournament.

=== Hanshin Tigers ===
He was the Tiger's 1st round 3rd alternative pick during the 2013 Nippon Professional Baseball draft (after not winning the lottery for Daichi Ohsera and Yuta Kakita). He signed a 100 million yen contract with Hanshin plus a 50 million yen signing bonus, for an estimated annual salary of 15 million yen. He was assigned the jersey no. 17.

2014

He joined the main squad for spring camp training in Okinawa, and started the practice game against the Eagles on Feb 19. After the game, he felt pain in his left ankle resulting from a torn ligament, and was consequently restrained from pitching further until he was fully healed. He resumed pitching in the Western League farm games in July, and finally debuted in his first official start on the August 10 home game against the Carps in Kyocera Dome where he gave up 4 runs in 4 innings. His first win came a week after in a match against the Baystars, where he allowed only two runs over 5⅓ innings. He had four more starts after that, but unfortunately lost all of them. He finished the season with a 1–4 record, and an ERA of 4.60.

2015

During spring camp, he competed with fellow 2013 draft and lefty Suguru Iwazaki for a spot in the pitching rotation, but in the end, Iwazaki prevailed. Only when Iwazaki fell into a slump mid-season did Iwasada get a chance to make it to the lineup. He started the May 24 match against the Baystars, but pitched poorly and promptly lost the match. He made up for it in his next start against the Marines during the interleague, where he pitched 7 scoreless innings and earned his first and only win for the season, and his first ever victory in Koshien.

During off-season, he was selected to pitch for the national team in the Winter League games in Taiwan. After pitching in 5 games, he received the league's Most Valuable Pitcher award after a 2–0 record and an astounding ERA of 0.53.

2016

This was Iwasada's breakout season. He trained with the farm team during spring camp, but his good performance on the plate earned him the 6th spot in the starting rotation when the season started. On April 2, he pitched 7 scoreless innings and struck out 12 batters, earning him the win in his first outing against the Baystars. His next start against the Carps was equally successful, and he achieved his first ever consecutive double digit strikeout record. He continued this streak on April 16, and became the first NPB southpaw pitcher and the only one from Central League to start their season with 3 consecutive double digit strikeouts.

On May 27, he single-handedly pitched a 1-0 complete shutout victory against the Giants, and became the first Hanshin pitcher to record a shutout victory against their arch rivals on his first outing against them. He fell into a slump during the Inter-league games in June, but his previous feats earned him his first ever spot in the mid-season All Star Series where he pitched as a reliever in Game 2. He had a few more shaky starts in the following weeks, but he recovered and became unstoppable in September where he recorded 4 wins with a 0.58 ERA. This won him his first ever Central League MVP of the Month award. He recorded his 10th win on his last start in Koshien, and finished the season with a personal best 10-9 record, 156 strike outs and a 2.90 ERA. He also had a 3-0 record and 0.58 ERA against the Giants, the best among the Tigers pitchers for the season.

2018

He was also selected to pitch for the 2018 All-Star Series.

== Playing style ==
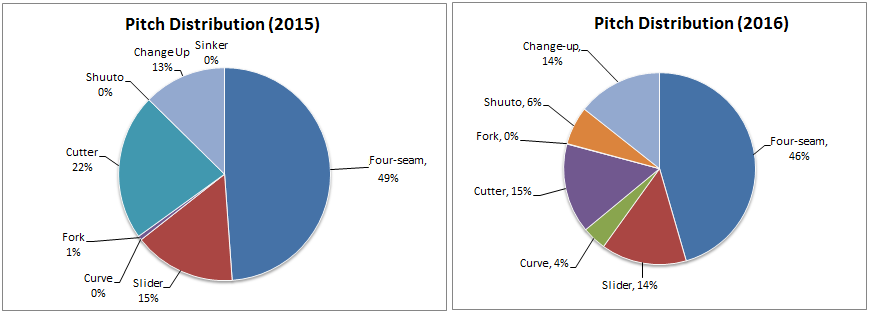
Pitch Distribution for Yuta Iwasada

He throws a four-seam fastball as his main pitch (max velocity of 148 km/h), and alternates with a cutter in the mid 130s, a slider in 120s and a change-up with a wide velocity range. Also included in his arsenal are a shuuto, a slow curveball in the low 110s, and occasionally a fork ball.

In 2016, Tigers ace Atsushi Nohmi started teaching him how to master his specialty pitch, the forkball, as well as tips on how to control his changeup better.

== Career statistics ==
- NPB Statistics
- Career statistics from Baseball Reference (Minors)
