= Yūta Kakita =

Japanese baseball player

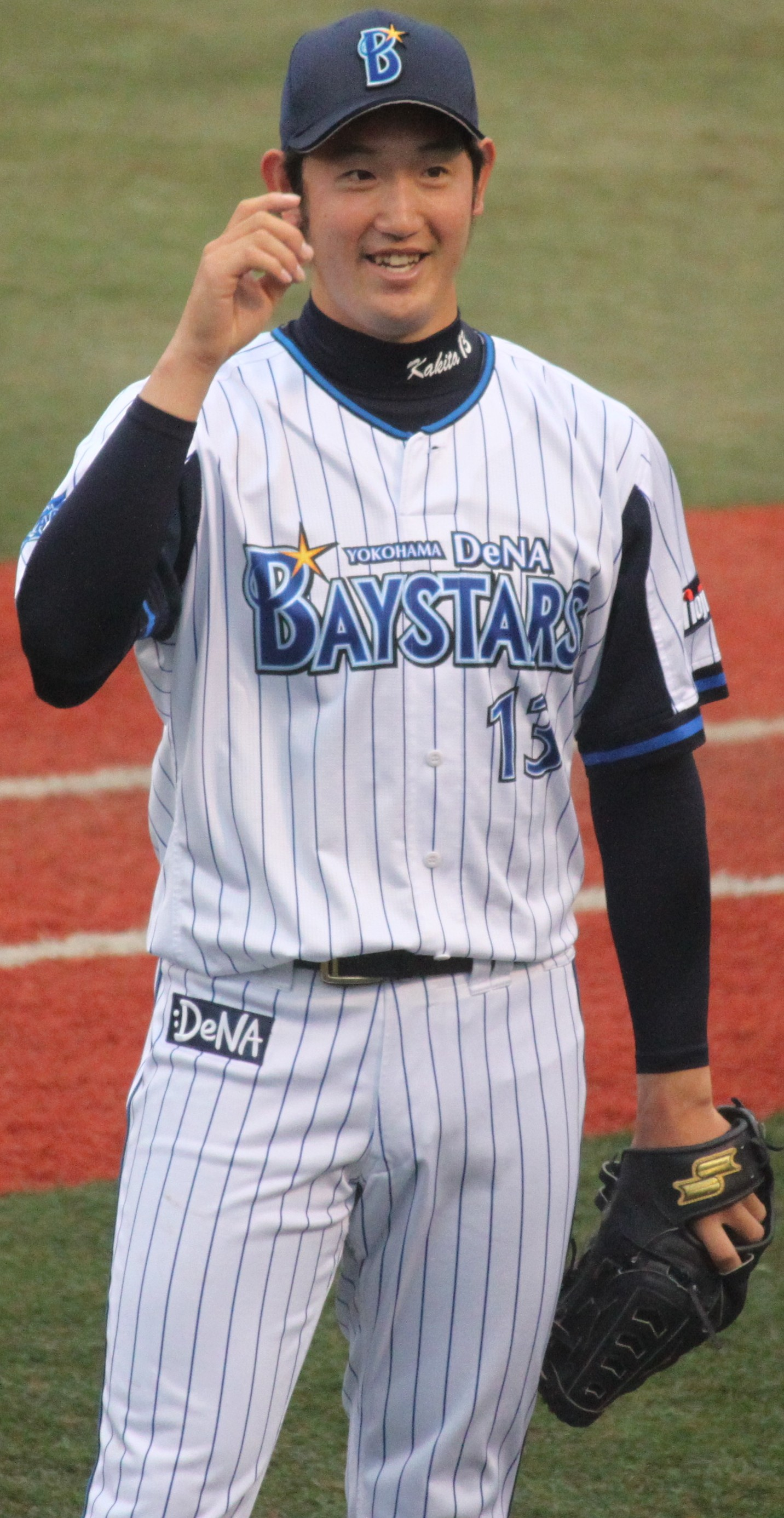
- Kakita with the Yokohama DeNA BayStars

free agent
- Pitcher
- Born: August 27, 1992 (age 33); Matsumoto, Nagano, Japan
- Bats: Right Throws: Right
- Stats at Baseball Reference

Teams
- Yokohama DeNA BayStars (2014–2017)

Yūta Kakita (柿田 裕太, Kakita Yūta; born August 27, 1992 in Matsumoto, Nagano, Japan) is a professional Japanese baseball pitcher, who is a free agent. He previously played for the Yokohama DeNA BayStars.
