= Ryō Miki =

Japanese baseball player (born 1991)

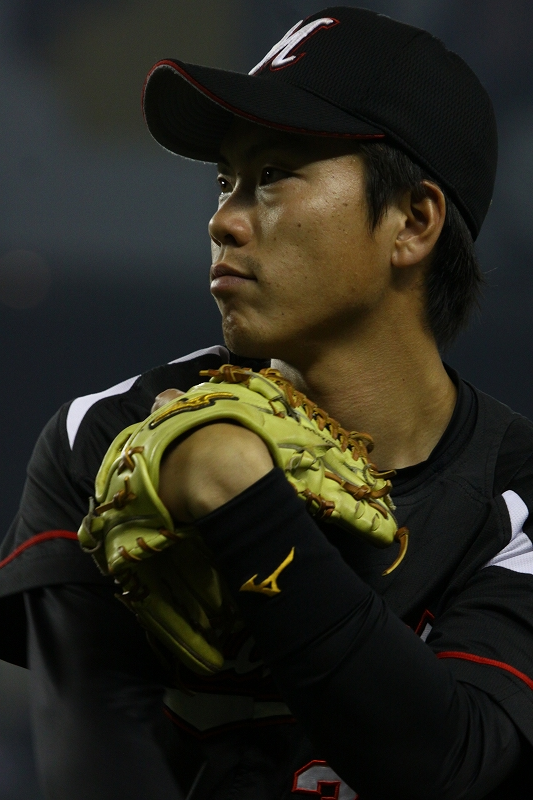

Chiba Lotte Marines – No. 72
- Infielder / Coach
- Born: October 25, 1991 (age 34); Takaishi, Osaka, Japan
- Batted: Right Threw: Right

NPB debut
- April 13, 2014, for the Chiba Lotte Marines

Last NPB appearance
- September 28, 2022, for the Chiba Lotte Marines

NPB statistics
- Batting average: .214
- Hits: 108
- Home runs: 5
- Runs batted in: 45
- Stolen base: 11
- Stats at Baseball Reference

Teams
- As player: Chiba Lotte Marines (2014–2023); As coach: Chiba Lotte Marines (2024–present)

Ryō Miki (三木 亮, Miki Ryō; born October 25, 1991 in Takaishi, Osaka, Japan) is a professional Japanese baseball player. He plays infielder for the Chiba Lotte Marines.
