= Ryota Fujii =

Japanese baseball player (born 1988)

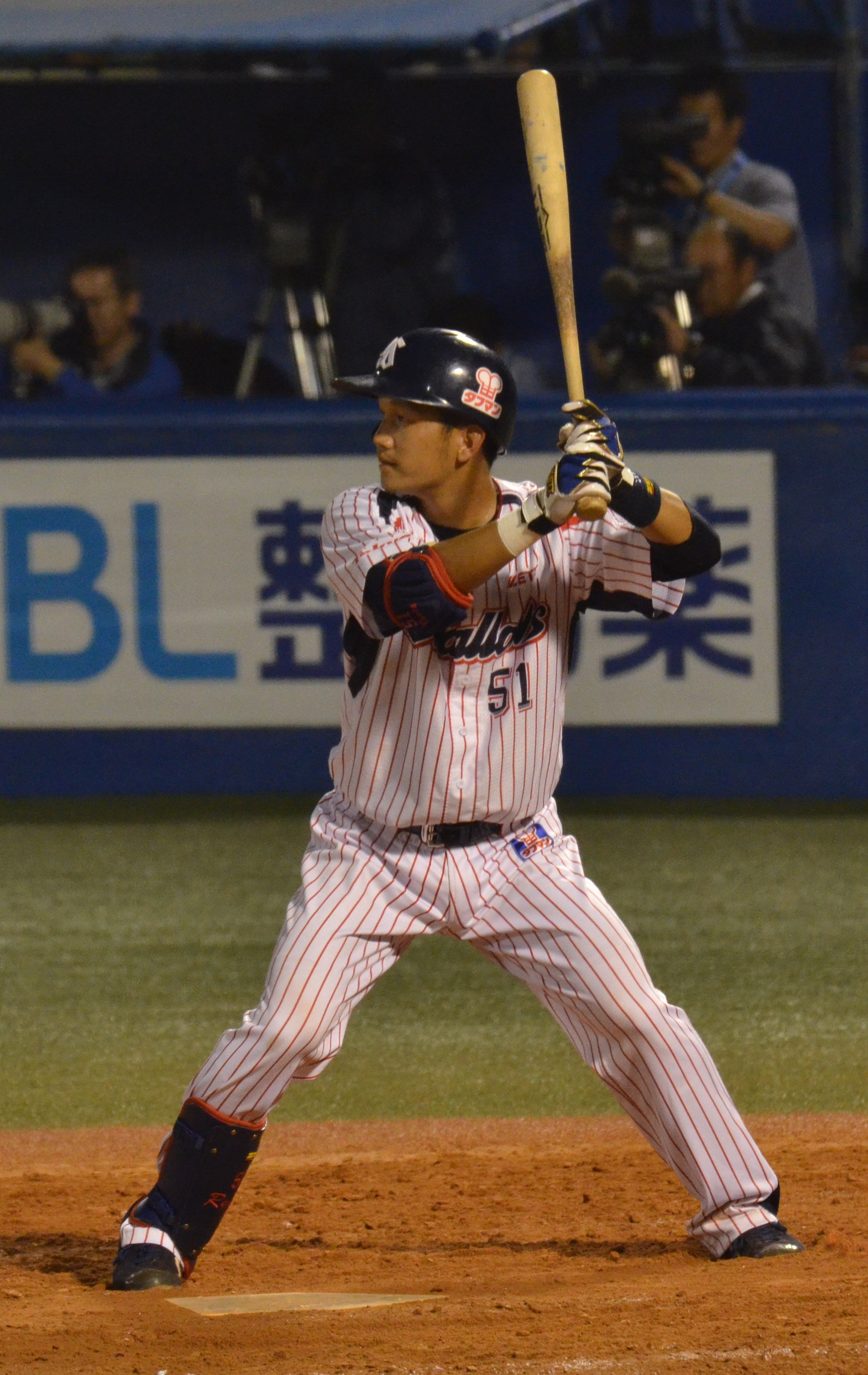
- Catcher/Infielder/Outfielder
- Born: September 30, 1988 (age 37); Kakogawa, Hyōgo, Japan
- Bats: Left Throws: Right

debut
- May 28, 2014, for the Tokyo Yakult Swallows

Career statistics (through 2020 season)
- Batting average: .242
- HR: 2
- RBI: 18
- Stats at Baseball Reference

Teams
- Tokyo Yakult Swallows (2014–2020)

Ryota Fujii (藤井 亮太, Fujii Ryota; born September 30, 1988) is a Japanese baseball player for the CITYLIGHT OKAYAMA. He has played for the Tokyo Yakult Swallows of Nippon Professional Baseball (NPB).

On December 2, 2020, he become free agent.
