= Shōta Suzuki (baseball, born 1995) =

Japanese baseball player (born 1995)

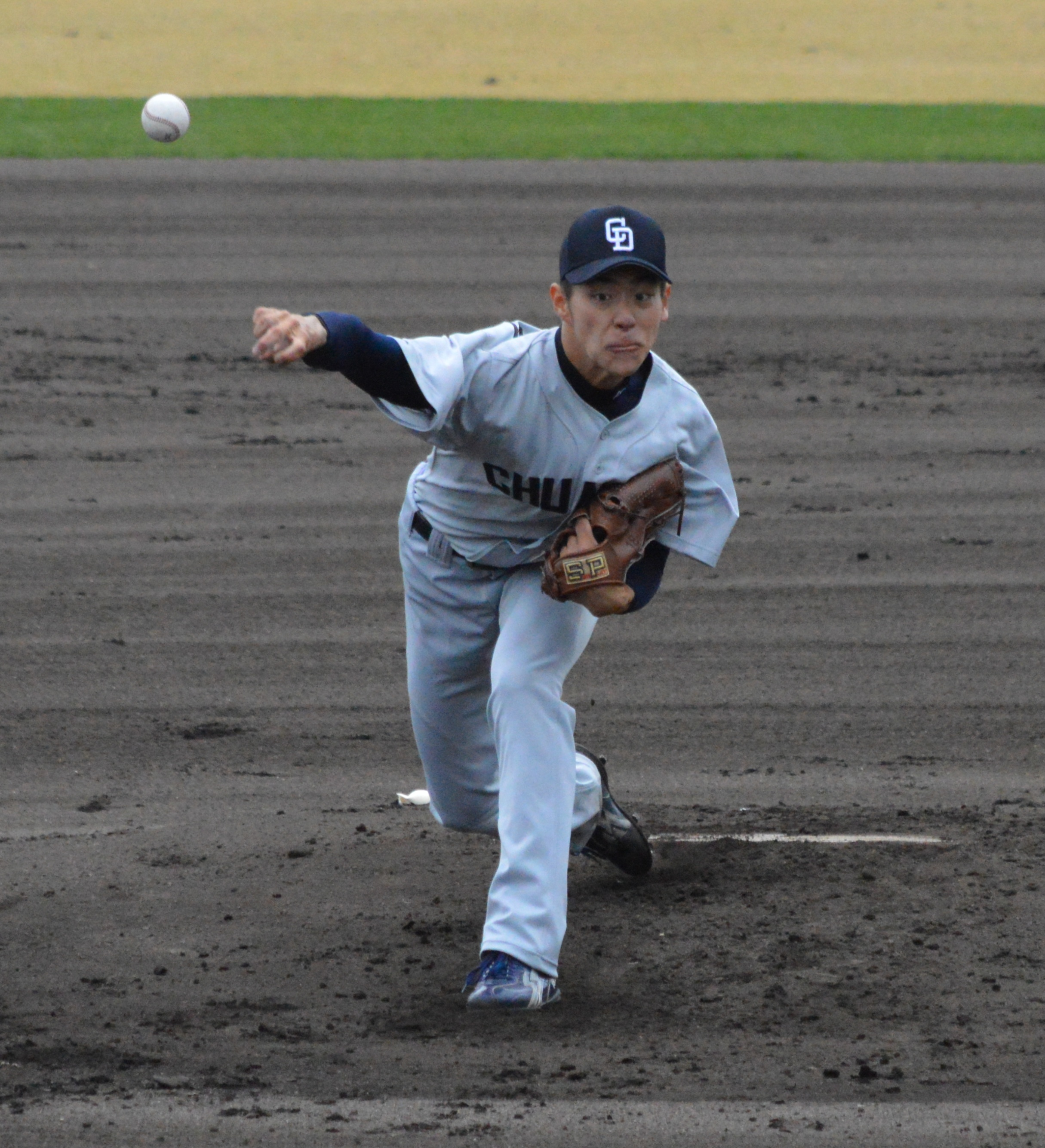
- Pitcher
- Born: June 16, 1995 (age 31); Kita-ku, Hamamatsu, Shizuoka, Japan
- Bats: Right Throws: Right

NPB debut
- June 17, 2014, for the Chunichi Dragons

NPB statistics (through 2020 season)
- Win–loss record: 5-5
- ERA: 4.41
- Strikeouts: 64
- Stats at Baseball Reference

Teams
- Chunichi Dragons (2014–2020); Hanshin Tigers (2021)

Shōta Suzuki (鈴木 翔太, Suzuki Shōta; born June 16, 1995 in Kita-ku, Hamamatsu, Shizuoka, Japan) is a Japanese professional baseball pitcher for the Hanshin Tigers of the Nippon Professional Baseball (NPB). He has played in NPB for the Chunichi Dragons. He last played for the Chunichi Dragons. Suzuki was the first draft pick for the Dragons in the 2013 NPB Draft.

== Early career ==
Suzuki started playing baseball from the first year of elementary school. Starting off as a short-stop he was converted to pitching in the 5th grade. As a student at Kitahamatoubu Junior High, Suzuki played for Hamamatsu Senior where in his 3rd year the team were runners up at the Shizuoka prefectural tournament.

He went to high school at Seirei Christopher High and in his first year was a bench player. In his second year the team made the best four of summer prefectural tournament and in his third year a best eight appearance was the best the school could muster as they failed to qualify for the summer Koshien.

== Professional career ==
=== Chunichi Dragons ===
At the 2013 Nippon Professional Baseball draft, Suzuki was the first pick for the Chunichi Dragons after the team missed out on now Rakuten Golden Eagles closer, Yuki Matsui. He became the first player from Seirei Christopher High School to turn pro. He signed a contract bonus worth ¥80,000,000 with a yearly salary of ¥7,200,000.

On 17 June 2014, in his native Hamamatsu, Suzuki made his NPB debut against the Saitama Seibu Lions. He came in as a relief pitcher in the 8th inning, taking two strikeouts and giving up a solo homerun to Shogo Akiyama in his single inning.

Suzuki would play in a further 4 matches in the 2014 season pitching 6 innings, taking 8 strikeouts for an ERA of 4.50.

In the second team in his rookie season, he would go 2-4 taking 31 strikeouts in 38 innings at an ERA of 4.74 in the Western League.

On 29 June 2015, he made his first appearance of the season with a scoreless one inning against the Hiroshima Carp

On 5 July 2015, he made his first professional start against the Yomiuri Giants. Suzuki only pitched 3 innings after giving up 5 hits including 3 earned runs as well as walking 3 consecutive batters.

Suzuki played in only two games with the first team in the 2015 season, pitching 4 innings with an ERA of 6.75.

His results in the second team in 2015 were not too impressive either as he went 1-6 taking 26 strikeouts in 47 innings at an ERA of 3.45.

In 2016, Suzuki started Spring training in the 2-gun team and impressed early by throwing 121 pitches in practice stating he wanted to give his all in any match and also admitting that last year "there was maybe something lacking technically as well as mentally." 2-gun pitching coach Kenta Asakura pointed to a need for him to strengthen his body if he wanted to compete at the highest level. Suzuki ended the camp having pitched 2200 pitches at an average of 90+ pitches per day.

Suzuki failed to find favour in the first team in 2016, but spent time with the Western League side that took part in the Asian Winter Baseball tournament in Taiwan where he was a mainstay alongside team-mates, Hiroki Kondō and Hayato Mizowaki.

After showing promise in spring training, Suzuki was called up to the first team for the first time in over a year where he pitched 1 inning of relief on 28 April against the Hanshin Tigers in a 6-0 loss. On 2 May Suzuki made his first start since 2015 against the Hiroshima Carp. On May 9, Suzuki recorded his first win in a Chunichi shirt in an 8-3 victory at Gifu Prefectural Baseball Stadium over the Yokohama DeNA Baystars in Gifu.

Following a good showing on the farm in mid-2018, on September 9, Suzuki started his first game of the season against the Hiroshima Carp where he threw 5 innings for 2 earned runs in a no-decision.

On December 2, 2020, he become a free agent.

=== Hanshin Tigers ===
On December 15, 2020, Suzuki signed with the Hanshin Tigers of the NPB and held press conference.

== Pitching Style ==
Suzuki can throw 5 pitches including a fastball that tops out at 143 km/h, a curve, a change-up, a fork and a slider.

== Personal ==
His spikes, glove and batting gloves are all of the "Sure Play" series provided by Sankyo Sports. As of 2014 only a very few players use the sports gear, including Rakuten's Yoshitaka Muto and former Swallow Hiroki Sanada. According to Suzuki, because he used to train late for baseball he is fairly unaware of common trends on television such as Momoiro Clover Z and AKB48. His favorite actress is Nanako Matsushima as he watched the program 24 Hour Emergency Ward which she starred in when he was in middle school. He is said to be a big believer in cleanliness and fully cleaned his dormitory room before making his first pro appearance.
