= 2017 Asia Professional Baseball Championship rosters =

The following contains the team rosters for the 2017 Asia Professional Baseball Championship in Tokyo, Japan.

== Chinese Taipei ==
- Manager: 2 Hong I-chung
- Coaches: 53 Huang Kan-lin, 91 Chiu Chang-jung, 34 Lin Cheng-feng, 93 Kuo Chien-lin, 3 Wu Chun-liang, 63 Tsai Yu-hsiang

Pos.	No.	Player	Date of birth (age)	Bats	Throws	Club
P	15	Lin Hua-ching	October 3, 1994 (aged 23)			(Taiwan) Lamigo Monkeys
P	16	Chu Chun-hsiang	April 15, 1995 (aged 22)			(Taiwan) Lamigo Monkeys
P	17	Chen Kuan-yu	October 29, 1990 (aged 27)			(Japan) Chiba Lotte Marines
P	21	Chen Yu-hsun	May 20, 1989 (aged 28)			(Taiwan) Lamigo Monkeys
P	22	Wang Yao-ling	February 5, 1991 (aged 26)			(Taiwan) Lamigo Monkeys
P	37	Chiu Hao-chun	December 29, 1990 (aged 26)			(Taiwan) Uni Lions
P	60	Wang Hung-chen	September 8, 1991 (aged 26)			(Taiwan) Chinatrust Brothers
P	71	Lo Kuo-hua	October 28, 1992 (aged 25)			(Taiwan) Fubon Guardians
P	72	Peng Shih-ying	July 2, 1992 (aged 25)			(Taiwan) Chinatrust Brothers
P	77	Lin Cheng-hsien	September 13, 1995 (aged 22)			(Taiwan) Fubon Guardians
C	31	Lin Yu-le	June 23, 1992 (aged 25)			(Taiwan) Uni Lions
C	62	Yen Hung-chun	April 30, 1997 (aged 20)			(Taiwan) Lamigo Monkeys
IF	5	Wu Nien-ting	June 7, 1993 (aged 24)			(Japan) Seibu Lions
IF	6	Lin Chen-fei	April 8, 1997 (aged 20)			(Taiwan) Lamigo Monkeys
IF	13	Chen Pin-chieh	July 23, 1991 (aged 26)			(Taiwan) Fubon Guardians
IF	20	Kuo Fu-lin	January 7, 1991 (aged 26)			(Taiwan) Uni Lions
IF	24	Chen Chieh-hsien	January 7, 1994 (aged 23)			(Taiwan) Uni Lions
IF	46	Fan Kuo-chen	November 25, 1994 (aged 22)			(Taiwan) Fubon Guardians
IF	83	Lin Li	January 1, 1996 (aged 21)			(Taiwan) Lamigo Monkeys
IF	85	Chu Yu-hsien	November 26, 1991 (aged 25)			(Taiwan) Lamigo Monkeys
OF	1	Yang Dai-kang	January 17, 1987 (aged 30)			(Japan) Yomiuri Giants
OF	9	Wang Po-jung	September 9, 1993 (aged 24)			(Taiwan) Lamigo Monkeys
OF	10	Chen Tzu-hao	July 29, 1995 (aged 22)			(Taiwan) Chinatrust Brothers
OF	32	Su Chih-chieh	July 28, 1994 (aged 23)			(Taiwan) Uni Lions
OF	39	Chan Tzu-hsien	February 24, 1994 (aged 23)			(Taiwan) Chinatrust Brothers

== Japan ==
- Manager: 2 Atsunori Inaba
- Coaches: 88 Makoto Kaneko, 81 Yoshinori Tateyama, 84 Yoshinori Murata, 82 Hirokazu Ibata, 87 Masaji Shimizu

Pos.	No.	Player	Date of birth (age)	Bats	Throws	Club
P	11	Shogo Noda	June 27, 1993 (aged 24)			(Japan) Saitama Seibu Lions
P	16	Katsuki Matayoshi	November 4, 1990 (aged 27)			(Japan) Chunichi Dragons
P	18	Shinsaburo Tawata	April 13, 1993 (aged 24)			(Japan) Saitama Seibu Lions
P	19	Yasuaki Yamasaki	October 2, 1992 (aged 25)			(Japan) Yokohama DeNA Baystars
P	20	Taisuke Kondoh	May 29, 1991 (aged 26)			(Japan) Orix Buffaloes
P	21	Shota Imanaga	September 1, 1993 (aged 24)			(Japan) Yokohama DeNA Baystars
P	23	Kazuki Yabuta	August 7, 1992 (aged 25)			(Japan) Hiroshima Toyo Carp
P	25	Katsunori Hirai	December 20, 1991 (aged 25)			(Japan) Saitama Seibu Lions
P	30	Tsuyoshi Ishizaki	September 9, 1990 (aged 27)			(Japan) Hanshin Tigers
P	34	Mizuki Hori	May 10, 1998 (aged 19)			(Japan) Hokkaido Nippon-Ham Fighters
P	90	Kazuto Taguchi	September 14, 1995 (aged 22)			(Japan) Yomiuri Giants
C	4	Kenya Wakatsuki	October 4, 1995 (aged 22)			(Japan) Orix Buffaloes
C	10	Kensuke Kondoh	August 9, 1993 (aged 24)			(Japan) Hokkaido Nippon-Ham Fighters
C	22	Tatsuhiro Tamura	May 13, 1994 (aged 23)			(Japan) Chiba Lotte Marines
C	62	Takuya Kai	November 5, 1992 (aged 25)			(Japan) Fukuoka SoftBank Hawks
IF	1	Yota Kyoda	April 20, 1994 (aged 23)			(Japan) Chunichi Dragons
IF	6	Sosuke Genda	February 16, 1993 (aged 24)			(Japan) Saitama Seibu Lions
IF	7	Shuta Tonosaki	December 20, 1992 (aged 24)			(Japan) Saitama Seibu Lions
IF	8	Shogo Nakamura	May 28, 1992 (aged 25)			(Japan) Chiba Lotte Marines
IF	12	Go Matsumoto	August 11, 1993 (aged 24)			(Japan) Hokkaido Nippon-Ham Fighters
IF	33	Hotaka Yamakawa	November 23, 1991 (aged 25)			(Japan) Saitama Seibu Lions
IF	63	Ryoma Nishikawa	December 10, 1994 (aged 22)			(Japan) Hiroshima Toyo Carp
OF	9	Louis Okoye	July 21, 1997 (aged 20)			(Japan) Tohoku Rakuten Golden Eagles
OF	37	Masayuki Kuwahara	July 21, 1993 (aged 24)			(Japan) Yokohama DeNA Baystars
OF	51	Seiji Uebayashi	August 1, 1995 (aged 22)			(Japan) Fukuoka SoftBank Hawks

== South Korea ==
- Manager: 90 Sun Dong-yol
- Coaches: 71 Lee Kang-chul, 77 Lee Jong-beom, 76 Ryu Ji-hyun, 72 Jung Min-chul, 88 Kim Jae-hyun, 92 Jin Kab-yong

Pos.	No.	Player	Date of birth (age)	Bats	Throws	Club
P	46	Kim Myeong-sin	November 29, 1993 (aged 23)			(South Korea) Doosan Bears
P	61	Ham Deok-ju	January 13, 1995 (aged 22)			(South Korea) Doosan Bears
P	59	Koo Chang-mo	February 17, 1997 (aged 20)			(South Korea) NC Dinos
P	29	Lee Min-ho	August 11, 1993 (aged 24)			(South Korea) NC Dinos
P	27	Jang Hyun-sik	February 24, 1995 (aged 22)			(South Korea) NC Dinos
P	10	Kim Dae-hyun	March 8, 1997 (aged 20)			(South Korea) LG Twins
P	28	Kim Yun-dong	April 1, 1993 (aged 24)			(South Korea) Kia Tigers
P	38	Im Gi-yeong	April 16, 1993 (aged 24)			(South Korea) Kia Tigers
P	21	Park Se-woong	November 30, 1995 (aged 21)			(South Korea) Lotte Giants
P	40	Park Jin-hyung	June 10, 1994 (aged 23)			(South Korea) Lotte Giants
P	26	Jang Pill-joon	April 8, 1988 (aged 29)			(South Korea) Samsung Lions
P	34	Shim Jae-min	February 18, 1994 (aged 23)			(South Korea) KT Wiz
C	42	Han Seung-taek	June 21, 1994 (aged 23)			(South Korea) Kia Tigers
C	22	Jang Seung-hyun	March 7, 1994 (aged 23)			(South Korea) Doosan Bears
IF	8	Ryu Ji-hyuk	January 13, 1994 (aged 23)			(South Korea) Doosan Bears
IF	2	Park Min-woo	February 6, 1993 (aged 24)			(South Korea) NC Dinos
IF	1	Kim Ha-seong	October 17, 1995 (aged 22)			(South Korea) Nexen Heroes
IF	6	Choi Won-jun	March 23, 1997 (aged 20)			(South Korea) Kia Tigers
IF	16	Ha Ju-suk	February 25, 1994 (aged 23)			(South Korea) Hanwha Eagles
IF	7	Jung Hyun	June 1, 1994 (aged 23)			(South Korea) KT Wiz
OF	31	Kim Seong-uk	May 1, 1993 (aged 24)			(South Korea) NC Dinos
OF	41	Lee Jung-hoo	August 20, 1998 (aged 19)			(South Korea) Nexen Heroes
OF	15	An Ik-hun	February 12, 1996 (aged 21)			(South Korea) LG Twins
OF	23	Na Kyung-min	December 12, 1991 (aged 25)			(South Korea) Lotte Giants
OF	36	Koo Ja-wook	February 12, 1993 (aged 24)			(South Korea) Samsung Lions
