= 2017 Asia Professional Baseball Championship =

Asia Professional Baseball Championship

Tournament details
- Country: Japan
- Dates: November 16–19
- Teams: 3

Final positions
- Champions: Japan (1st title)
- Runners-up: South Korea
- Third place: Chinese Taipei

Tournament statistics
- Games played: 4
- Attendance: 104,826 (26,207 per game)

Awards
- MVP: (Japan) Shuta Tonosaki

The 2017 Asia Professional Baseball Championship (APBC 2017), sanctioned by the World Baseball Softball Confederation (WBSC) and ortganized with the Chinese Professional Baseball League, Korea Baseball Organization and Nippon Professional Baseball leagues, was the first edition of APBC, and was held in Japan from November 16 to 19.

== Participating teams ==
- Chinese Taipei
- Japan
- South Korea

=== Rosters ===
Only players born in 1993 or later, or that have less than three years of professional experience are eligible for the competition. However, teams are also allowed up to three wild cards which do not meet either of these criteria. Korea is the only team to have elected not to use its wild cards.

== Format ==
Each of the three teams participated in a round-robin series, playing each other team once. The two teams with the best win-loss percentage faced each other in the final, with the team finishing higher considered the "home team", meaning that they had the advantage of batting last.

== Round-robin stage ==
Pos	Team	W	L	Pct.	R	RA
1	Japan	2	0	1.000	16	9
2	South Korea	1	1	.500	8	8
3	Chinese Taipei	0	2	.000	2	9

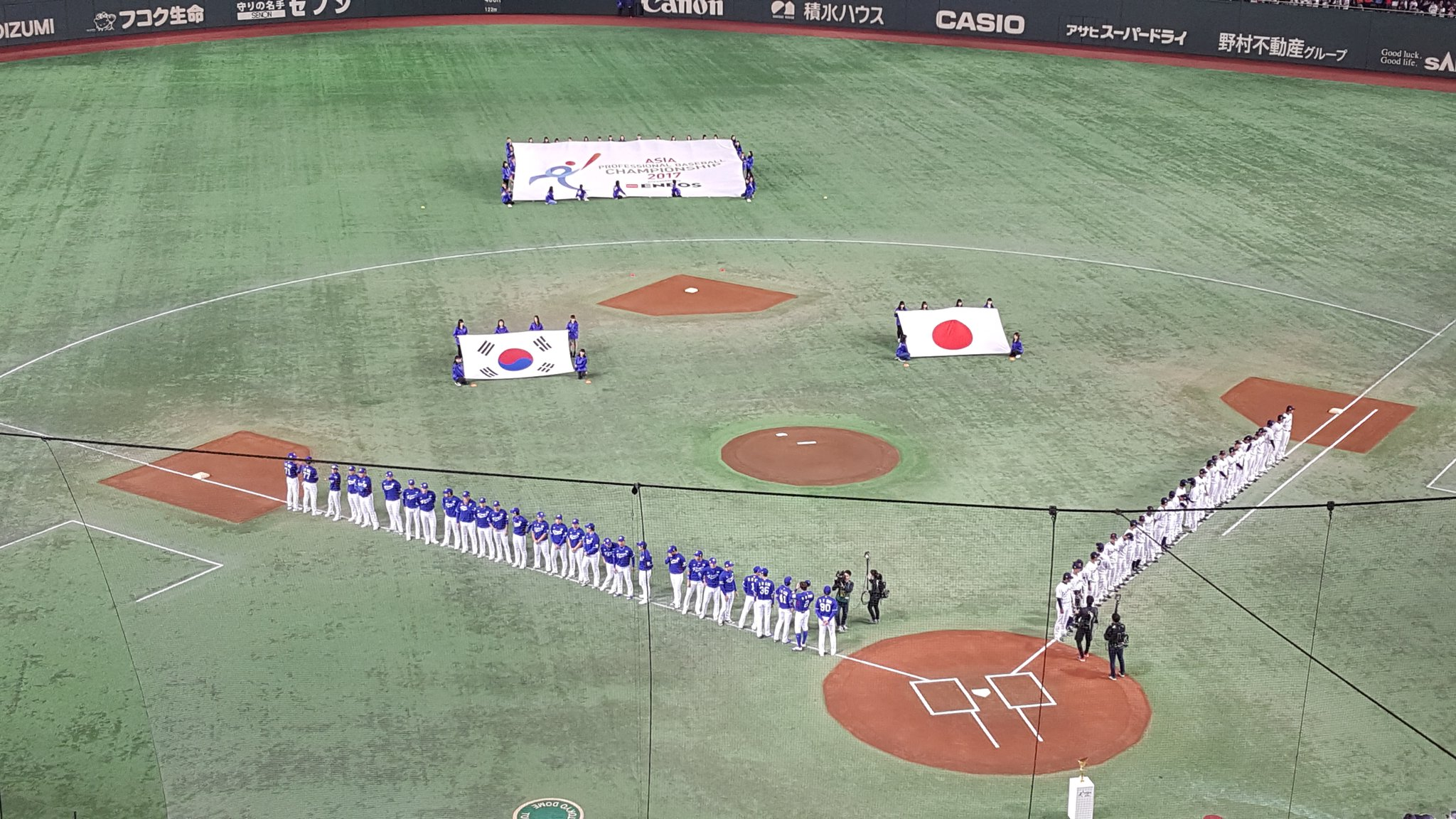
Game 1: Korea vs. Japan, November 16, 2017

November 16, 2017, 19:12 (JST) at Tokyo Dome in Tokyo, Japan
Team	1	2	3	4	5	6	7	8	9	10	R	H	E
South Korea	0	0	0	4	0	0	0	0	0	3	7	10	1
Japan	0	0	1	0	0	2	0	0	1	4	8	11	0
WP: Mizuki Hori (1–0) LP: Lee Min-ho (0–1); Home runs: KOR: Kim Ha-seong (1); JPN: Hotaka Yamakawa (1), Seiji Uebayashi (1); Attendance: 32,815 Game time: 4 hours 29 minutes Boxscore

November 17, 2017, 19:03 (JST) at Tokyo Dome in Tokyo, Japan
Team	1	2	3	4	5	6	7	8	9	R	H	E
Chinese Taipei	0	0	0	0	0	0	0	0	0	0	4	0
South Korea	0	0	0	0	0	1	0	0	X	1	4	0
WP: Im Gi-yeong (1–0) LP: Chen Kuan-yu (0–1) Sv: Jang Pill-joon (1); Attendance: 6,040 Game time: 3 hours 27 minutes Boxscore

November 18, 2017, 18:41 (JST) at Tokyo Dome in Tokyo, Japan
Team	1	2	3	4	5	6	7	8	9	R	H	E
Japan	0	1	0	0	2	0	3	1	1	8	12	1
Chinese Taipei	0	0	0	0	0	0	0	0	2	2	7	0
WP: Shota Imanaga (1–0) LP: Lin Cheng-hsien (0–1); Home runs: JPN: Shuta Tonosaki (1); TWN: Chu Yu-hsien (1); Attendance: 35,473 Game time: 4 hours 4 minutes Boxscore

== Final ==
November 19, 2017, 18:11 (JST) at Tokyo Dome in Tokyo, Japan
Team	1	2	3	4	5	6	7	8	9	R	H	E
South Korea	0	0	0	0	0	0	0	0	0	0	3	0
Japan	0	0	0	1	3	2	1	0	X	7	11	0
WP: Kazuto Taguchi (1–0) LP: Park Se-woong (0–1); Home runs: KOR: None; JPN: Ryoma Nishikawa (1); Attendance: 30,498 Game time: 3 hours 29 minutes Boxscore

== Final standings ==
Rk	Team	W	L	R	RA
1	Japan	3	0	23	9
2	South Korea	1	2	8	15
3	Chinese Taipei	0	2	2	9

APBC 2017

Japan
First title

== Awards ==
The APBC 2017 organization announced MVP and All APBC 2017 team of Asia Professional Baseball Championship 2017 as follows.

MVP
Award	Player
MVP	(Japan) Shuta Tonosaki

All APBC 2017 team
Position	Player
P	(Japan) Kazuto Taguchi
C	(South Korea) Han Seung-taek
1B	(Chinese Taipei) Chu Yu-hsien
2B	(South Korea) Park Min-woo
3B	(Japan) Ryoma Nishikawa
SS	(South Korea) Kim Ha-seong
OF	(Japan) Shuta Tonosaki
OF	(Japan) Go Matsumoto
OF	(Chinese Taipei) Wang Po-jung
DH	(Japan) Kensuke Kondoh
