= Yūya Yanagi =

Japanese baseball player (born 1994)

Yūya Yanagi 柳 裕也
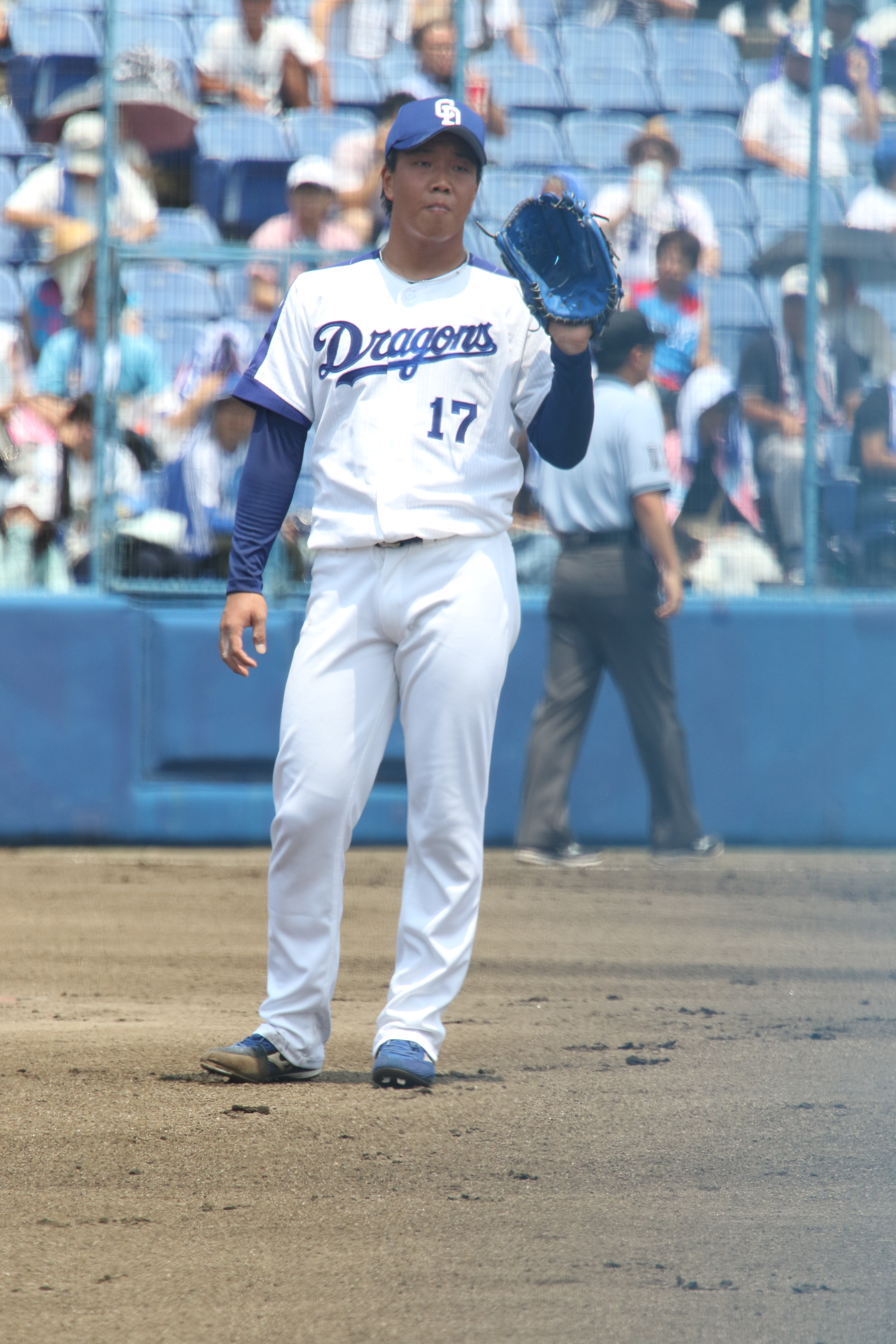

Chunichi Dragons – No. 17
- Pitcher
- Born: April 22, 1994 (age 32); Miyakonojo, Miyazaki, Japan
- Bats: Right Throws: Right

NPB debut
- May 23, 2017, for the Chunichi Dragons

Career statistics (through July 24, 2026)
- Win-Loss: 55–64
- ERA: 3.21
- Strikeouts: 908
- Stats at Baseball Reference

Teams
- Chunichi Dragons (2017–present)

Career highlights and awards
- 1x Central League Best Nine (2021); 1x NPB Golden Glove Award (2021); 1× Central League ERA leader (2021); Central League strikeout leader (2021); 2× NPB All-Star (2019, 2021); 1× Interleague valuable player award (2019)

Yūya Yanagi (柳 裕也, Yanagi Yūya; born April 22, 1994 in Miyakonojo, Miyazaki, Japan) is a professional Japanese baseball player. He pitches for the Chunichi Dragons.

Yanagi pitched for Yokohama High School at the Japanese High School Baseball Championship and captained his Meiji University side to the 2016 Meiji Jingu Tournament title. He has represented Japan at national level in various age groups on several occasions.

== Early career ==
=== Early life ===
Yanagi started playing baseball in 3rd grade for Shibita Boys Sports and when in 6th grade he captured the Japanese national championship.

At around the same time, Yanagi's father died in a traffic accident when Yanagi was 12 years old where he represented his family in mourning. At Miyakonojo Municipal Komatsubara Junior High, Yanagi played for Miyakonojo Seniors. In his 3rd year he was selected in the Japanese national team where he helped the team to victory in a USSSA Championship in 2009 where he was also awarded the Cy Young Award for the tournament as best pitcher.

=== Yokohama High School ===
After joining Yokohama Senior High School, in his junior year, Yanagi participated in the 83rd Japanese High School Baseball Invitational Tournament. In the first round against Nagasaki Prefectural Hasami High School, Yanagi pitched 3 innings in relief giving up just 2 hits and taking 6 strikeouts for one earned run however his team was kept quiet by Hasami ace, Ryoma Matsuda meaning Yokohama were knocked out of the tournament. In Summer of his junior year at the Kanagawa prefectural tournament, he threw down 8 innings for 1 run against 83rd Invitational Tournament winners and Masaru Watanabe led Tokai University Sagami High School helping the team to win. In the tournament final, Yanagi would have a showdown with Toko Gakuen's Yuki Matsui where he threw down 8 innings for 1 earned run where his team would be walk-off winners in the 10th inning allowing them to advance to the 93rd Japanese High School Baseball Championship. In the second round against Kenya Nagasaka led Takasaki Health & Welfare University High school, Yanagi pitched 5 scoreless frames before giving up 5 runs in the 6th inning. His team, however, would rally to win in the 10th inning. In the third round against Chiben Gakuen High school pitching off against a battery of Daiki Aoyama and Katsushi Nakamichi, Yanagi was able to keep his opponent to one run through 8 innings but was withdrawn after giving up a hit to the lead-off batter in the 9th inning, his replacement, however, would unfortunately give up the game in a come-from-behind loss.

In spring of his 3rd year at the 84th Japanese High School Baseball Invitational Tournament, Yanagi tossed a 3-hit complete game shutout against a Ren Wada led Kochi High School. In the second round against Seiko Gakuen high school, Yanagi pitched 9 innings for 1 earned run as well as going 5–3 with a home run with the bat to lead his team to a 7–1 victory. In the quarter-finals against Kanto Daiichi ace Yusuke Nomura, Yanagi pitched 8 innings for 2 earned runs but would give up the winning runs to Kanto in the 9th leading to his team's exit from the tournament. In the summer Kanagawa prefectural tournament, Yanagi would once again come up against Yuki Matsui and Toko Gakuen where his team would be bundled out 3–4 in the quarter-finals.

At Koshien Stadium, Yanagi finished with career statistics of 6 games played, 42 2/3 innings pitched, 37 strikeouts and an ERA of 2.74. At his time at Yokohama, Yanagi played alongside future pros Tomo Otosaka, Kensuke Kondo, Yuto Takahama and Daiki Asama.

=== Meiji University ===
After entering Meiji University, Yanagi started playing in fall of his first year in the Tokyo Big6 Baseball League. At the 44th Meiji Jingu Tournament, against Seisa Dohto University, Yanagi threw 5 scoreless innings in a 4–1 victory. In fall of his sophomore year, Yanagi became the team ace where he went 3–1 in decisions with a 2.21 ERA to help lead his team to the title. At the 45th Meiji Jingu Tournament, he threw 6 scoreless innings in relief over 3 games, helping the team to runners-up. In Summer of his junior year, Yanagi was called up to the Japanese national team for the 2015 Summer Universiade.

In the following fall, Yanagi threw a league top 60 innings, recording 5 wins and gaining selection in the best 9.

In what would become his 4th year, Yanagi became team captain where he threw in 10 games recording a 6-1 record with a league-leading 0.87 ERA and 87 strikeouts where he would once again be selected in the best 9 to contribute to Meji's first spring league win in 3 years. At the 65th Japanese Collegiate National Championships in the first game against Kansai University of International Studies, Yanagi would make an appearance in relief but his team would ultimately lose out in a tie-breaker.

Following the tournament, Yanagi was selected for the Japanese collegiate national team for the USA vs Japan Collegiate All-Star Series. In the second game as a starter, Yanagi threw 7 innings including 8 consecutive punch-outs and 12 strikeouts in total. In the 5th game, Yanagi would once again show his prowess as a starter taking 7 strikeouts over 5 games where he helped his team to victory in the tournaments while Yanagi himself was selected as tournament MVP and as best pitcher. Following the tournament, Yanagi was also selected to play in the 2016 Haarlem Baseball Week tournament.

In fall of his 4th year, Yanagi took his 300th career strikeout, allowing him to enter the top 15 strikeout leaders in Tokyo Big6 history. Against Waseda University he recorded 20 strikeouts in 12 inning complete game. With 5 wins and a 1.64 ERA, Yanagi once again captured Best 9 honours and contributed to his team winning the league once more.

In the 47th Meiji Jingu Tournament in the first game against Kansai University, Yanagi hurled 5 scoreless innings and in the semi-finals against Jobu University he threw a further 7 scoreless innings while hitting a home run. In the final against J. F. Oberlin University, pitching off against Chihaya Sasaki, Yanagi let up a 2-run lead before being replaced in the 4th inning but his team would rally with Tomoya Hoshi throwing down the remaining innings scoreless leading to Meiji University's first national title.

Over his college career, Yanagi had a record of 23-8, 288.1 IP, 338 SO and a 1.84 ERA. At Meiji University, Yanagi played alongside future pros Sachiya Yamasaki, Kento Itohara, Kenta Uehara, Seishirō Sakamoto, Shun Takayama, Tomoya Hoshi, Keita Sano and Katsushi Nakamichi.

=== 2016 Nippon Professional Baseball draft ===
On 20 October 2016, Yanagi was the contested first round pick between the Chunichi Dragons and the Yokohama DeNA Baystars at the 2016 NPB Draft but was selected by the Dragons in a lottery and on 29 November signed a provisional contract with a ¥100,000,000 sign-on bonus and a ¥15,000,000 yearly salary with ¥50,000,000 in incentives.

== Professional career ==
=== Chunichi Dragons ===
==== 2017 ====
Expected to be an immediate contributor, Yanagi was groomed in Spring training to become a part of the starting day rotation and was even challenged to become opening day starter by manager, Shigekazu Mori. Unfortunately, before the start of the 2017 NPB season, Yanagi was injured. Yanagi spent time with the farm team recuperating and pitched 16 scoreless innings with the lower grade team before being registered for the Dragons top team for the first time on May 21. Yanagi made his debut on May 23 with one scoreless inning against the Yokohama DeNA Baystars. On May 28, he was given his first substantial work as a pitcher as he came in for 3 innings of long relief against the Tokyo Yakult Swallows after Raul Valdes gave up 6 runs in his first two innings where he took 4 strikeouts for 1 earned run.

On 18 June, Yanagi claimed his first professional win against the Seibu Lions where he pitched out 7 innings giving up 7 hits and 3 earned runs.

Yanagi ended the season starting 7 games with a 1–4 record, 4.47 ERA and 45 strikeouts.

==== 2018 ====
On 10 April against the Tokyo Yakult Swallows, Yanagi threw a 2-hit, 6 strikeout, complete game shut-out to mark the first of his career. This was the first complete game shutout of the 2018 NPB season.

Yanagi ended his second season having thrown 53.1 innings over 10 starts for a 5.23 ERA and 42 strikeouts.

==== 2019 ====
Yanagi began the season in the starting rotation where he went 9–2 for a 2.73 ERA before the All-Star break. He was subsequently added to the 2019 Central League All-Star roster by manager selection where he pitched 2 innings in relief for 3 earned runs in the second game of the series. On 14 June, Yanagi fanned a career-high 13 batters in 1-run complete game against the Chiba Lotte Marines. At the end of interleague Yanagi was awarded Valuable Player award NPB leading 1.17 ERA. Yanagi would only claim 2 more wins in the second half of the season but would be the only Dragons pitcher to register double-digit wins. During the season he started against the Tokyo Yakult Swallows 9 times with the Yakult hitters' acclimatization to his pitching touted as a reason for his poorer second half results. Yanagi finished the season with a 11-7 record, 170.1 IP and a 3.53 ERA effectively making his break-out season.

Confirming his ability to perform at the highest level, Yanagi's salary was increased three-fold to \45,000,000 for the 2020 season.

== Playing style ==
From an overhand slot, Yanagi throws a four-seam, a cutter and a curveball. Ahead of the 2020 season, Yanagi reported to have added a sinker to his pitch mix.

At college his fastball topped out at 150 km/h and is said to get good vertical spin on his fastball. His curveball has been clocked at 110 km/h and is said to have had so much significant downward movement that unless that catcher signaled for a curve, they wouldn't be able to catch it. After going pro, Yanagi's average speed had been in the 130 km/h range but by 2019 had worked this up to an average speed in the 140km/h range.

== Personal ==
Yanagi followed Daisuke Matsuzaka to play at the same school, Yokohama High School.
