= Keisuke Takano =

Japanese baseball player (born 1991)

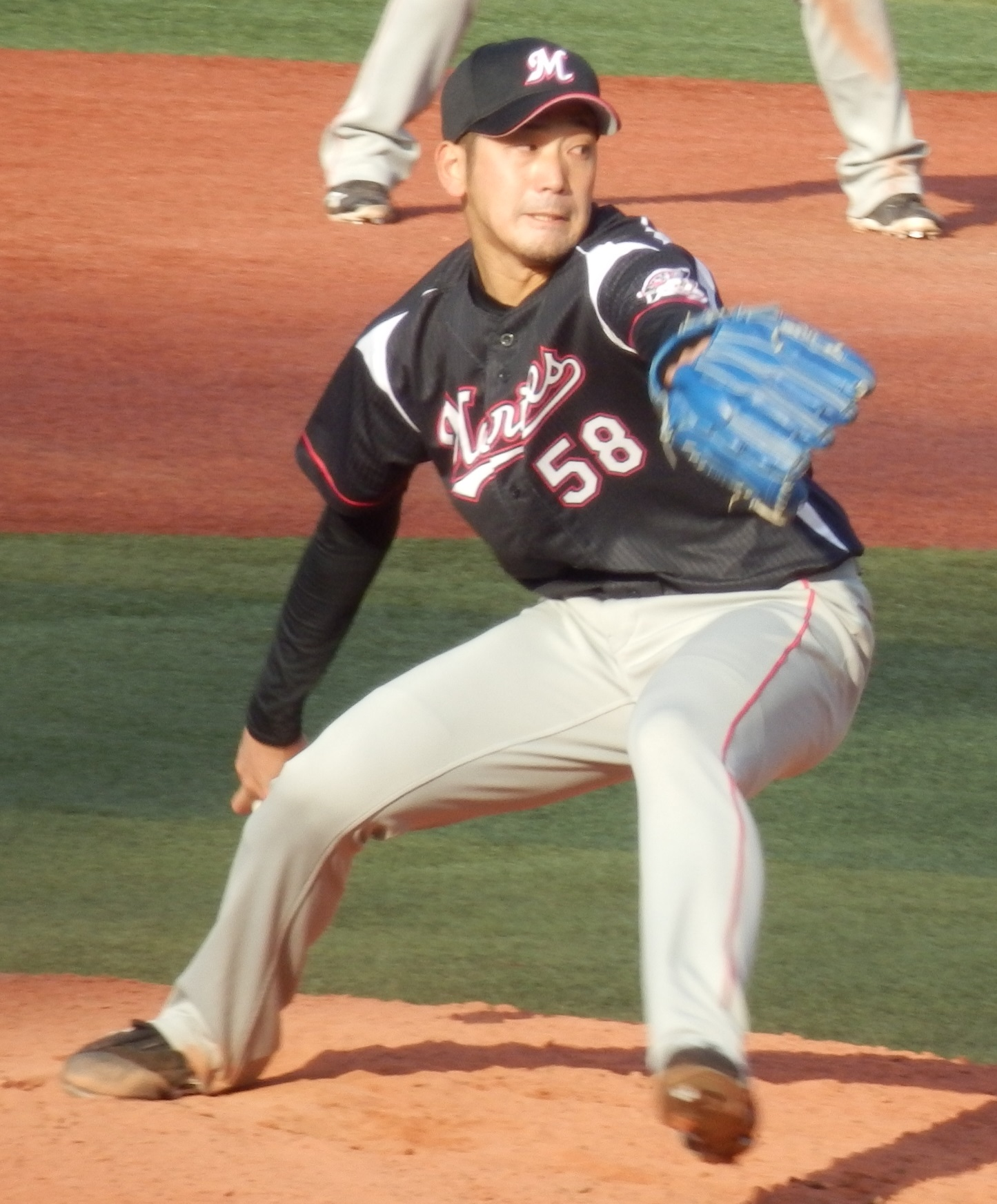
- Pitcher
- Born: December 28, 1991 (age 34); Kure, Hiroshima, Japan
- Batted: Right Threw: Right

Professional debut
- NPB: May 28, 2016, for the Chiba Lotte Marines
- CPBL: October 10, 2021, for the CTBC Brothers

Last NPB appearance
- September 4, 2019, for the Hanshin Tigers

NPB statistics
- Win–loss record: 2–0
- Earned run average: 6.62
- Strikeouts: 30

CPBL statistics
- Win–loss record: 0–0
- Earned run average: 5.40
- Strikeouts: 2
- Stats at Baseball Reference

Teams
- Chiba Lotte Marines (2016–2019); Hanshin Tigers (2019); CTBC Brothers (2021)

Keisuke Takano (高野 圭佑, born December 28, 1991) is a Japanese former professional baseball pitcher. He played in Nippon Professional Baseball (NPB) for the Chiba Lotte Marines and Hanshin Tigers, and in the Chinese Professional Baseball League (CPBL) for the CTBC Brothers.

== Career ==
=== Chiba Lotte Marines ===
The Chiba Lotte Marines selected Takano with the seventh overall selection in the 2015 Nippon Professional Baseball draft. On May 28, 2016, Takano made his Nippon Professional Baseball debut for the Marines. Takano pitched in 14 games for Lotte in 2016, registering a 5.87 ERA with 7 strikeouts in 15.1 innings. Takano struggled greatly the next season, pitching to an ugly 11.81 ERA with 7 strikeouts in 10.2 innings of work across 8 games. Takano had a rebound season in 2018, recording a 4.15 ERA with 10 strikeouts in 17.1 innings across 17 appearances. He began the 2019 season with Lotte, pitching in 2 games for the Marines, giving up two runs in 1.1 innings with no strikeouts for an ERA of 13.50.

=== Hanshin Tigers ===
On July 4, 2019, Takano was traded to the Hanshin Tigers in exchange for reliever Tsuyoshi Ishizaki. Takano made four appearances for the Tigers in 2019, pitching to a 4.76 ERA in 5 2/3 innings to go along with six strikeouts. Takano did not make an appearance for the team in 2020, instead spending the season with their minor league club, pitching in 20 games and recording a 5.83 ERA with 23 strikeouts in 41 2/3 innings of work. On December 2, 2020, Takano became a free agent.

=== CTBC Brothers ===
On April 7, 2021, Takano signed with the CTBC Brothers of the Chinese Professional Baseball League. He was released on October 11.
