= Ha-seong Kim =

South Korean baseball player (born 1995)

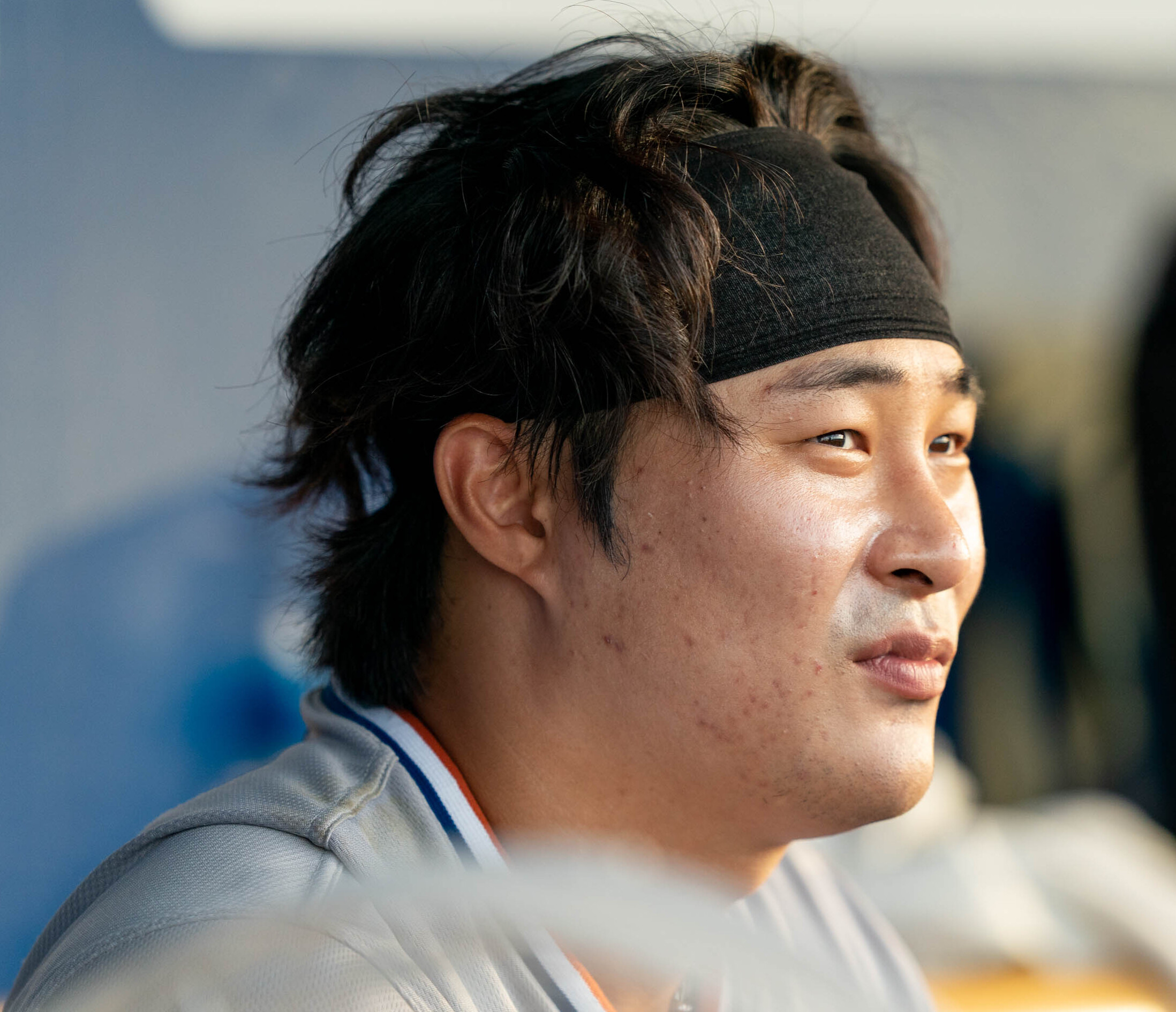
- Kim with the Durham Bulls in 2025

Free agent
- Infielder
- Born: October 17, 1995 (age 31); Bucheon, Gyeonggi, South Korea
- Bats: Right Throws: Right

Professional debut
- KBO: May 16, 2014, for the Nexen Heroes
- MLB: April 1, 2021, for the San Diego Padres

KBO statistics (through 2020 season)
- Batting average: .294
- Home runs: 133
- Runs batted in: 575

MLB statistics (through 2026 season)
- Batting average: .234
- Home runs: 52
- Runs batted in: 226
- Stolen bases: 86
- Stats at Baseball Reference

Teams
- Nexen / Kiwoom Heroes (2014–2020); San Diego Padres (2021–2024); Tampa Bay Rays (2025); Atlanta Braves (2025–2026)

Career highlights and awards
- KBO: 3× KBO Golden Glove Award (2018–2020); MLB: Gold Glove Award (2023); International: WBSC Premier12 All-World Team (2019)
Medals
Men's baseball
Representing South Korea
WBSC Premier12
Silver medal – second place	2019 Tokyo	Team
Asian Games
Gold medal – first place	2018 Jakarta	Team
Asia Professional Baseball Championship
Silver medal – second place	2017 Tokyo	Team

- Ha-seong Kim
- Hangul: 김하성
- Hanja: 金河成
- RR: Gim Haseong
- MR: Kim Hasŏng

Ha-seong Kim (Korean: 김하성; born October 17, 1995) is a South Korean professional baseball infielder who is a free agent. He has played in Major League Baseball (MLB) for the San Diego Padres, Tampa Bay Rays, and Atlanta Braves, and in the KBO League for the Nexen Heroes.

Kim was drafted 41st overall by the Heroes in the 2014 KBO League Draft. He made his KBO debut with the Heroes in May 2014 and won the KBO League Golden Glove Award in 2018, 2019 and 2020. In December 2020, Kim signed with the Padres and made his MLB debut in 2021. In 2023, Kim became the first Korean-born player to win a Gold Glove Award. He has also played for the South Korea national team in international baseball tournaments.

== Early life ==
Kim was born on October 17, 1995, in Bucheon, Gyeonggi Province, the youngest of three children.

Kim attended Yatap High School in Seongnam, Gyeonggi, and in 2013, led his high school to a runner-up finish in the national high school baseball tournament. In his final high school season, Kim hit for a .375 batting average with a .477 on base percentage and 20 stolen bases.

== Professional career ==
=== Nexen/Kiwoom Heroes (2014–2020) ===
==== 2014 ====
On May 18, he came out as a substitute in Game 3 against the Lotte Giants at Sajik Baseball Stadium and doubled with his first hit and tripled with his second hit. On June 4, he scored his first home run against pitcher Lee Tae-yang in the top of the eighth inning in Game 2 of NC Dinos.

On July 3, Kang Jung-ho, who was out with back pain in Game 3 against the Lotte Giants at Mokdong Baseball Stadium, played as a pinch-runner. With the score tied at 9–9 in the top of the eighth inning and Heo Do-hwan's error made it to the third base with two outs, he advanced to catch Son's hit and throw the ball to prevent a run at an important moment. The commentators also praised him for his skillful catch.

He started as the ninth batter and shortstop in Game 2 against the Kia Tigers on July 5. He hit a two-run home run against Park Jun-pyo, which was a 3:3 off-balance home run and a meaningful one that met starting pitcher Andy Van Hekken's 11th win. Kim hit two home runs during his three years in high school, and he reportedly did so in 30 games.

On July 6, he also played as the eighth shortstop in Game 3 against the Kia Tigers. Kim's family visited the stadium on this day, and he quickly caught a hit on the chest of third baseman Yoon Seok-min in the top of the eighth inning and threw it out to first base. On Aug. 15, in Game 16 of the season against Doosan Bears, Seo Geon-chang played in the final defense of the ninth inning. Oh Jae-won's class ball was well cleared with a diving catch and showed his good defense to catch the final out count.

In a game against the Kia Tigers on Aug. 16, Kang started as the eighth batter and shortstop in place of Kang Jung-ho, who was designated as the designated hitter for physical fitness. He showed good performance in both offense and defense on the day, and the commentator kept mentioning the "Kim Ha-sung Project." At bat, he got on base 100 percent with one hit and three walks from four times at bat, and managed to steal base after a walk in the fourth inning, and managed to score a point leisurely despite Seo Geon-chang's outfield forward defense when he had a hit. In particular, his RBI single in the fifth inning completed his team's record of hitting all the starters for the season. He also showed good performance in defense by handling tricky balls without difficulty.

Since then, he has steadily gained experience in the first division with great expectations from the manager, and has met the backup expectations as much as Kang's backup shortstop. He also mentioned that Kang Jung-ho is one of the candidates to occupy the position of shortstop, which will be vacant from the 2015 season due to his entry into the Major League.

==== 2015 ====
He played as the starting shortstop in the opening game against the Hanwha Eagles on March 28. He seemed to work out well with his first at-bat hit, but he dropped the ball in the fourth inning due to a bunt failure and a collision with third baseman Kim Min-sung when he defended. Since then, he has been unstable on the defense side, but he has been criticized for showing unexpectedly good performance in his second year of high school. In particular, Kim Ha-sung, who consistently hits in the Nexen Heroes' lineup at the beginning of the season, stood out.

On April 5, in Game 3 against the SK Wyverns, he hit a home run and began to catch up with the game, which was dragged 8:0. The game eventually lost 13–7, but he showed growth by batting .318 with a .400 on-base percentage, 0.545 with a slugging percentage, 0.945, and 7 hits in 22 at-bats with one homer, two RBIs, two runs and one stolen base.

After a 2–1 game against the Hanwha Eagles on April 13, he changed his jersey number from 0 to 7, the number he used in high school. Since then, he has been praised for his rapid growth and stable defense. On April 15, in the first game against the SK Wyverns at Munhak Baseball Stadium, he showed a good defense reminiscent of Kang Jung-ho. On April 19, in Game 3 against the Kia Tigers at Gwangju Baseball Stadium, he played four hits, including a back-to-back home run against Yoon Suk-min. When he showed good performance in offense and defense, especially in long balls, he was nicknamed "Peace Prince."

By April 30, he showed a tremendous record of batting average, slugging percentage, home run, RBI, and OPS among the main shortstop in the 10th team. The shortstop ops was 1.002, and he also ranked sixth in slugging percentage and fourth in war.

On May 1, he recorded one hit and one stolen base from four times at bat in Game 1 against the LG Twins at Jamsil Baseball Stadium. Against Henry Sosa, he also drew admiration from his fans by showing a unique bat control reminiscent of Kang Jung-ho, who has become a major leaguer.

In Game 3 against the Hanwha Eagles at Mokdong Baseball Stadium on June 4, he went 3 for 5 at-bats for the first time in a long time, with one RBI, two runs scored, and two walks, contributing to his team's victory. He was even interviewed by a trainer after the game. On June 6, he hit a walk-off home run in the bottom of the 10th inning in Game 2 against the Doosan Bears at Mokdong Baseball Stadium. It was even more dramatic because he started with a 0:8 deficit and Kim Min-sung's two-run homer in the bottom of the ninth inning tied the score at 8:8. The extended game's 10th solo homer, also referred to it as Kim's first walk-off homer of his career. Individually, he showed his recovery from the slump by shooting home runs for the second straight day, and the team managed to trade places by beating Doosan, which had been in third place, to fourth place without a hitch. Kim Ha-sung was also still 19 years old, resulting in his sixth all-time teenage double-digit home run.

Because of how he performed this season, he was elected through both fan and team votes to be honored to participate in the KBO All-Star Game for the first time since his debut.

On July 8, in Game 2 against the Kia Tigers at Mokdong Baseball Stadium, after walking in the bottom of the 12th inning, he entered the home after the ball fell due to a collision between first baseman Choi Yong-kyu and batter Ko Jong-wook, and scored a walk-off score.

On September 4, against the Hanwha Eagles, he showed a tremendous defense in charge of all three outcounts in a 6:5 victory at the bottom of the ninth inning. In particular, the last outcount was the highlight, and the laser throw that caught the runner on first base, Song Joo-ho, at home, was a defense that kept the victory.The 2015 season showed incredible performances in the KBO League, where it is increasingly difficult to find high school graduate monster rookies, even though they did not achieve 20–20, but they are now just 20 years old in their second year as professionals.

It is overwhelming compared to Kang Jung-ho's second year as a professional shortstop, and the defense, which was worried about 16 errors in the first half alone, showed a sharp decrease in the number of errors in the second half, showing a clear improvement. Even though he played in 140 of 144 games, he performed well and washed them clean.

In many ways, it was a season that made expectations for more brilliant performances in the future.

==== 2016 ====
On June 5, he went 2 for 4 (one homer) with two RBIs and two runs scored against the Kia Tigers, the final two-run shot in the eighth inning when the home run was losing 3–2. By already hitting 11 homers and 10 steals, his chances of reaching 20–20, which he did not achieve last year, are extremely high.

In the final game of the weekend against KT, he hit his 12th home run that sealed the victory.

On June 18, against the Hanwha Eagles, he fired a two-run shot that broke the tight balance of one-on-one against Yoon Kyu-jin. In the match against Hanwha on June 19, he started his first at-bat poorly with a double play, but then hit two consecutive hits, and in the fourth at-bat, he hit a running solo shot against Lee Dong-gul.

He hit no home runs during July, but on August 4, he finally succeeded in hitting his 15th solo home run of the season against the Lotte Giants at Sajik Baseball Stadium.

On Sept. 4, he had one hit in every four games in September before Hanwha. On Sep. 19, against the Lotte Giants, he contributed to Nexen's victory by hitting a superb defense in the bottom of the fifth inning by catching all three out-counts by himself and his 19th homerun, which went from 5:0 to 8:0. In the final at-bat, he completed a six-run game with an error hit to the second baseman. With only one home run left until 20–20.

On Sept. 20, he also accumulated a home run against Kim Jin-woo against the Kia Tigers, and became the third shortstop in the KBO to join the 20–20 club. In particular, Kim Ha-sung's 20–20 joined the club at the second youngest age.

It is a season in which he succeeded in joining the 20–20 club by coming up to the third batting order after overcoming a short hitting slump in the early stages.

==== 2017 ====
On April 11, he hit his first home run of the season against Sowon against the KT Wiz. On Apr. 18, he went 3 for 4 against the SK Wyverns, with one home run, two RBIs and one run scored. In his first three-hit game of the season, he picked up his second two-run shot of the season against Kelly. On April 23, he went 2-for-5 with one homer, two RBIs and two runs scored against the Lotte Giants. On May 18, he hit a grand slam against Lee Tae-yang in the first inning against the Hanwha Eagles. It is Kim Ha-sung's fifth grand slam of the season and his first.

On June 9, he performed very well against the Kia Tigers. His performance was three hits, two homers, four RBIs and two runs from five times at bat, and he hit his seventh three-run of the season against shaky Yang in the top of the first inning, and he also hit his eighth solo shot of the season against Yang in the top of the fifth inning. With Kim Ha-sung's performance, this season's first multi-homer game, his team won 7–5.

On July 4, he hit a solo home run on the left side against the Hanwha Eagles. On July 29, he went 4 for 5 against the Samsung Lions, one home run, five RBIs and three runs.

On Aug. 8, against the Kia Tigers, Lim pulled out a two-run left-handed hit from the first inning, making it the final hit. He now has only one left on his 20th homer for the second consecutive year. On Aug. 11, he succeeded in achieving 20 home runs for the second consecutive year with three hits and one home run in four at-bats against the Doosan Bears. On August 30, he went 2-for-3 with three RBIs against the SK Lions, becoming the third all-time single-season 100-run shortstop and second in shortstop single-season RBIs.

He has achieved a personal career high season with the second-best RBI in shortstop history, the most career hits, the most RBIs, and the batting average of 300. He has played a role well as the fourth batter, and his value as a young and viable shortstop was said to be inexorable.

==== 2018 ====
On April 4, he recorded three hits and two runs in four at-bats against KT, showing a batting performance that erased his sluggish performance.

On May 5, he recorded a solo shot for Children's Day, tying for the most home runs in his team with six. He also played a role in filling the vacancy of Park Byung-ho and Seo Geon-chang.

On July 2, he was not named the Best All-Star, as the final voting result for the 2018 KBO All-Star Game ranked third in the shortstop category. However, he played on the coach's recommendation list, and on the day of the All-Star Game on July 14, he played as a pinch hitter in the top of the third inning of the main game, hitting a solo home run, and then three-run home run in the eighth inning, recording four RBIs, including a multi-homer game. He eventually beat Jarrod Hoying by just one vote to be named the "Mr. All-Star."

He started as the ninth shortstop in the Asian Games qualifying match against Taiwan, but he remained hitless. However, he came out as the second batter and played a consistent role, including a one-run home run against Japan, making up for his sluggish performance, winning a gold medal, and earning a special military service exemption.

On Sept. 21, with his team losing 3–0 against the Samsung Lions, he hit Baek's first pitch in the bottom of the fourth inning and hit a tying three-run home run over the central fence. And Kim Ha-sung hit 20 home runs for the third consecutive year on the day. He went 2 for 4 with three RBIs and one home run.

On Oct. 16, he went 3 for 5 with two doubles, an RBI, and a run scored in the first wild-card game against the KIA Tigers. Good defense was also seen during the game, resulting in the team's 6:10 win to advance to the semi-playoffs.

In the first half of 2018, Kim Ha-sung won a special military service for winning the Asian Games gold medal thanks to his good performance, and was also selected as Mr. All-Star in the All-Star Game and won the much-awaited "Golden Glove."

He said he was disappointed that he won the Golden Glove for a performance that was not satisfactory to him due to a bad performance in the second half. However, he evaluated 20 home runs for three consecutive years, and the number of errors decreased compared to last year, positively, and was evaluated as a player with potential for development.

==== 2019 ====
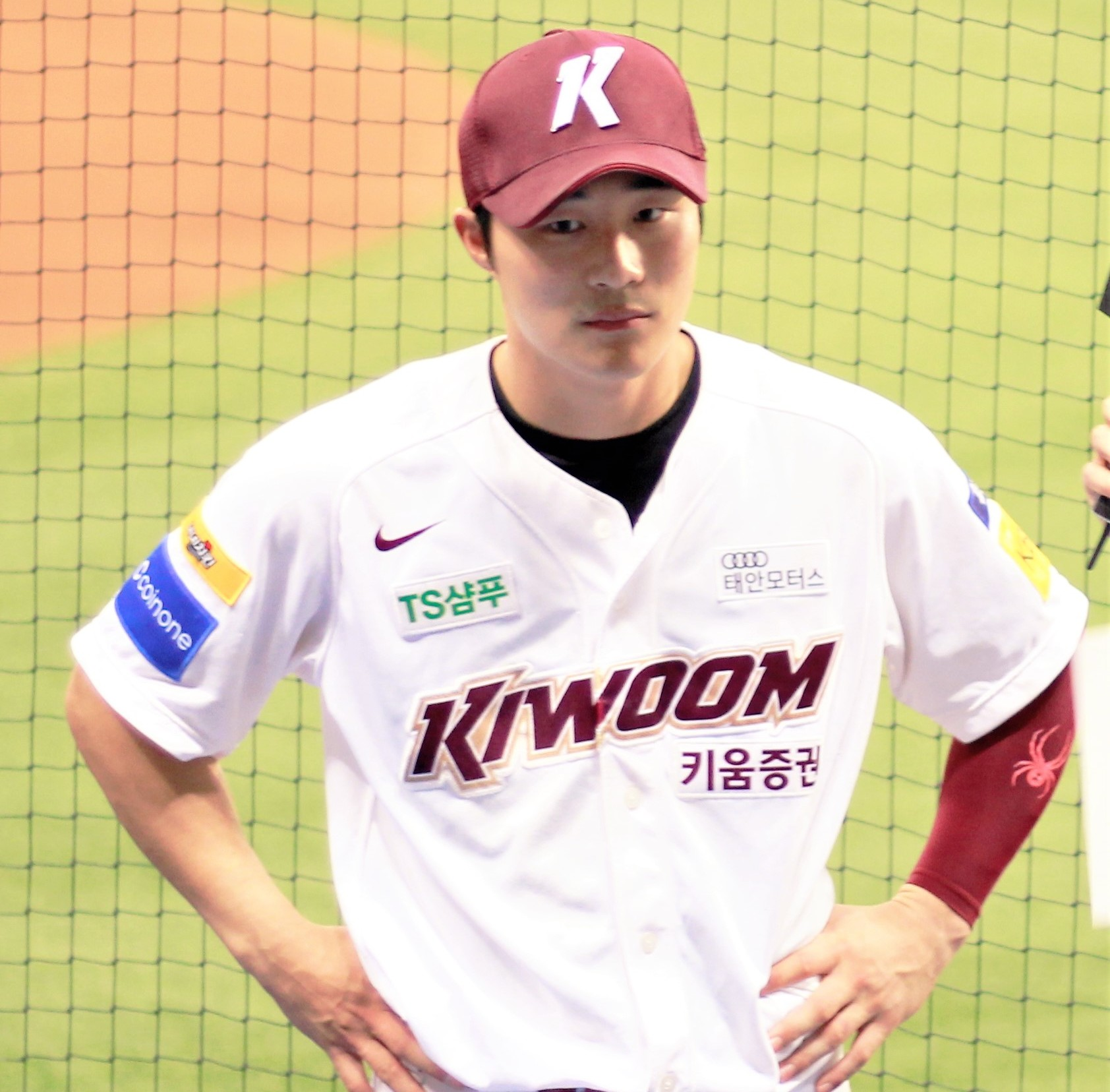
Kim with the Kiwoom Heroes (2019)

By April 29, Kim had hit only two home runs, but he remained active in the central lineup, recording an RBI in almost every game.

On May 19, Kim was the third designated hitter against the Lotte Giants at Gocheok Sky Dome, and he recorded two hits, two runs, one homer and four RBI in four at-bats with a home run behind left field in the second inning and a single in front of left field in the fourth inning. On June 6, Kim came out as the third third baseman in Game 9 against the SK Wyverns, leading his team to victory with a home run behind left field in the first inning, a first-pitch left-center double between runners first and second in the third inning, a hit in front of center field in the seventh inning, and a double in the eighth inning.

On June 27, against the Kia Tigers, he came out as the second shortstop and recorded two hits, one homer, three RBI, and one stolen base in five at-bats with a double to left field in the first inning, and a home run behind left field with two outs and runners on the first and third bases in the seventh inning. On September 11, in Game 15 against the SK Wyverns at Munhak Baseball Stadium, Kim hit a two-run timely hit against Kim Kwang-hyun to achieve his first 100 RBI and 100 runs of the season.

In the semi-playoff, Kim went 2-for-5 with two RBI in Game 4, leading his team to the playoffs. In the first round of the playoffs, he received the Daily MVP award for an RBI double leading 1–0 in the 11th inning of extra time. Kim went 0-for-4 with one walk in Game 3 of the playoffs. He made his second Korean Series appearance since his debut, winning 10–1.

Although most hitters had a much lower season than the previous year due to official balls, Kim showed tremendous productivity, with all records except home runs rising significantly. Thanks to this, he finished the 2019 season with first place in the fielder's WAR and second place in the WPA. In particular, the 7.22 WAR recorded this season was not only a personal career high, but also ranked seventh in the history of shortstops in a single season.

==== 2020 ====
On May 20, Kim hit a solo home run against Park Jong-hoon in the first inning in Game 2 of the season against the SK Wyverns. On May 23, he hit a solo home run against Choi Young-hwan in the third inning in the second game of the season against the Lotte Giants in the Sajik Baseball Stadium. On May 31, Kim hit a three-run home run against Bae Je-seong at a time when his team was trailing 9–4 against the KT Wiz, in Gocheok.

Kim rebounded again by shooting a three-run home run against Lim Chan-kyu in the Gocheok LG Twins match on June 5. On June 12, he made his first blood home run of the season against Koo Chang-mo, drawing a 125-meter-long arch against Koo Chang-mo against the NC Dinos. On June 13, Kim hit a two-run home run against Lee Jae-hak against the Dinos, hitting his second consecutive home run. On June 30, he went 5-for-5 against the Doosan Bears and became the top contributor to his team's victory. After the game, Kim had posted an OPS of 0.919, 16 home runs, 55 RBI, and 11 stolen bases, approaching career- highs in almost all statistics.

On September 4, Kim stole his 19th base of the season against the Hanwha Eagles. On September 8, he went 4-for-6 against the SK Wyverns, showing good performance; he then hit his 24th homer of the season, setting a career-high for a single season. On September 14, Kim hit his 30th home run of the year against the Wiz. He subsequently became the second shortstop in KBO history to reach 30–100–100.

For the second consecutive year, Kim had recorded over 140 wRC+, solidifying his status as the best right-handed hitter in the league. He became the second shortstop to have 30 home runs, 100 RBI, and 100 runs since Kang Jung-ho. It is the first KBO record for a shortstop to join the 20–20 club at the same time. Therefore, due to the KBO league's initial record-crazy nature, Kim produced a formidable performance to become an MVP of the season. Kim won the KBO League Golden Glove Award for his third consecutive year in 2020.

After the 2020 season, on November 25, 2020, the Heroes announced it was allowing Kim to enter the posting system to play in Major League Baseball (MLB).

=== San Diego Padres (2021–2024) ===
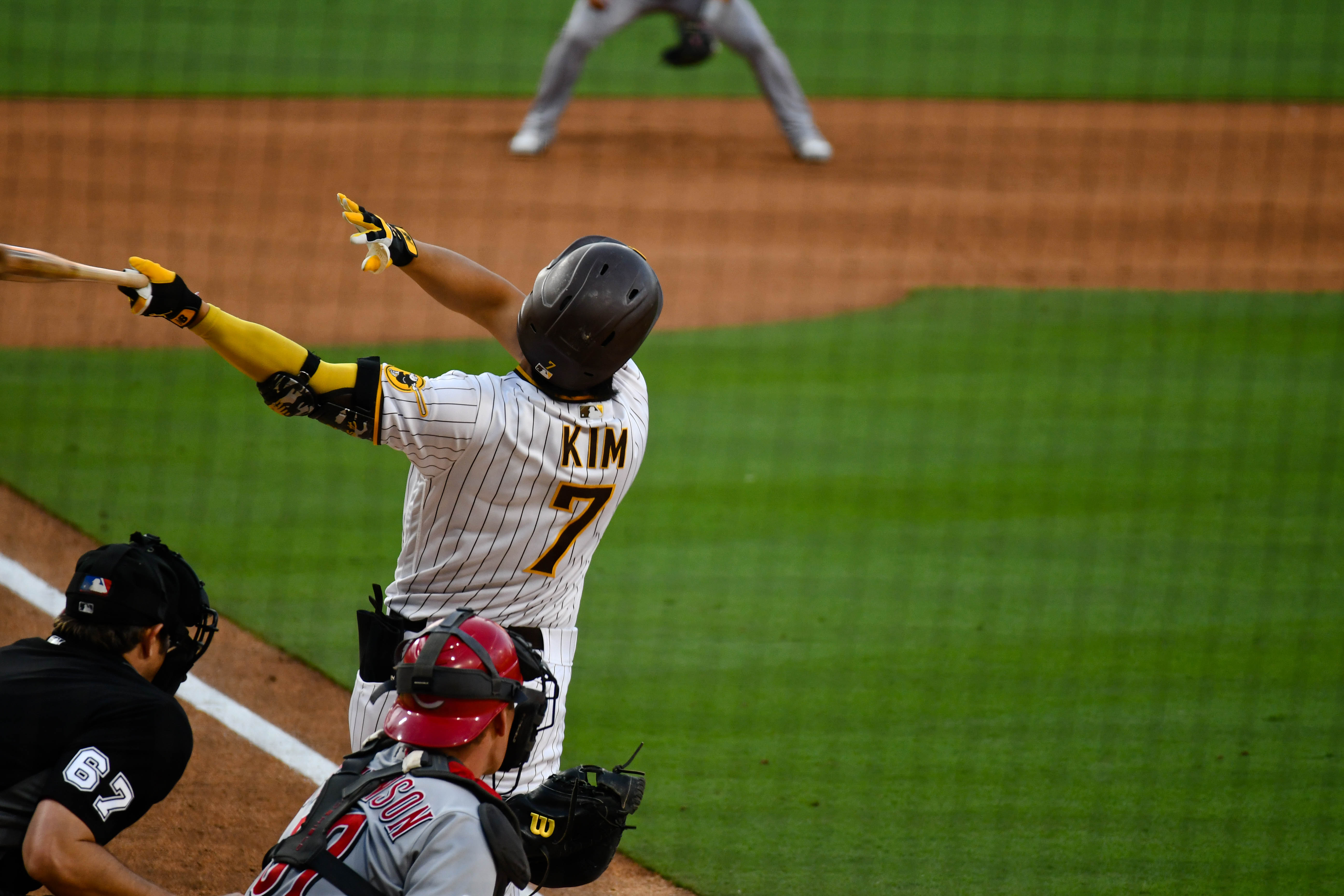
Kim swinging in 2021

On December 31, 2020, Kim signed with the San Diego Padres of MLB for a four-year, $28 million deal, including a mutual option for the 2025 season. Kim made his major-league debut on April 1, 2021. He pinch hit for Emilio Pagán, and struck out against Alex Young of the Arizona Diamondbacks. Kim hit his first MLB home run in a 7–4 victory over the Texas Rangers in Arlington, Texas on April 10, 2021. On June 19, after the Padres lost Fernando Tatís Jr. due to injury, Kim hit a two-run home run in the bottom of the eighth inning to lead the Padres to a 7–5 victory against the Cincinnati Reds. Kim saw increased playing time at shortstop for the Padres after Tatís was placed on the injured list (IL) in late July 2021. On August 1, Kim hit a home run and drove in three runs in his first game filling in for Tatís. Kim finished the 2021 season batting .202 with eight home runs, 34 RBIs, and six stolen bases in 117 games.

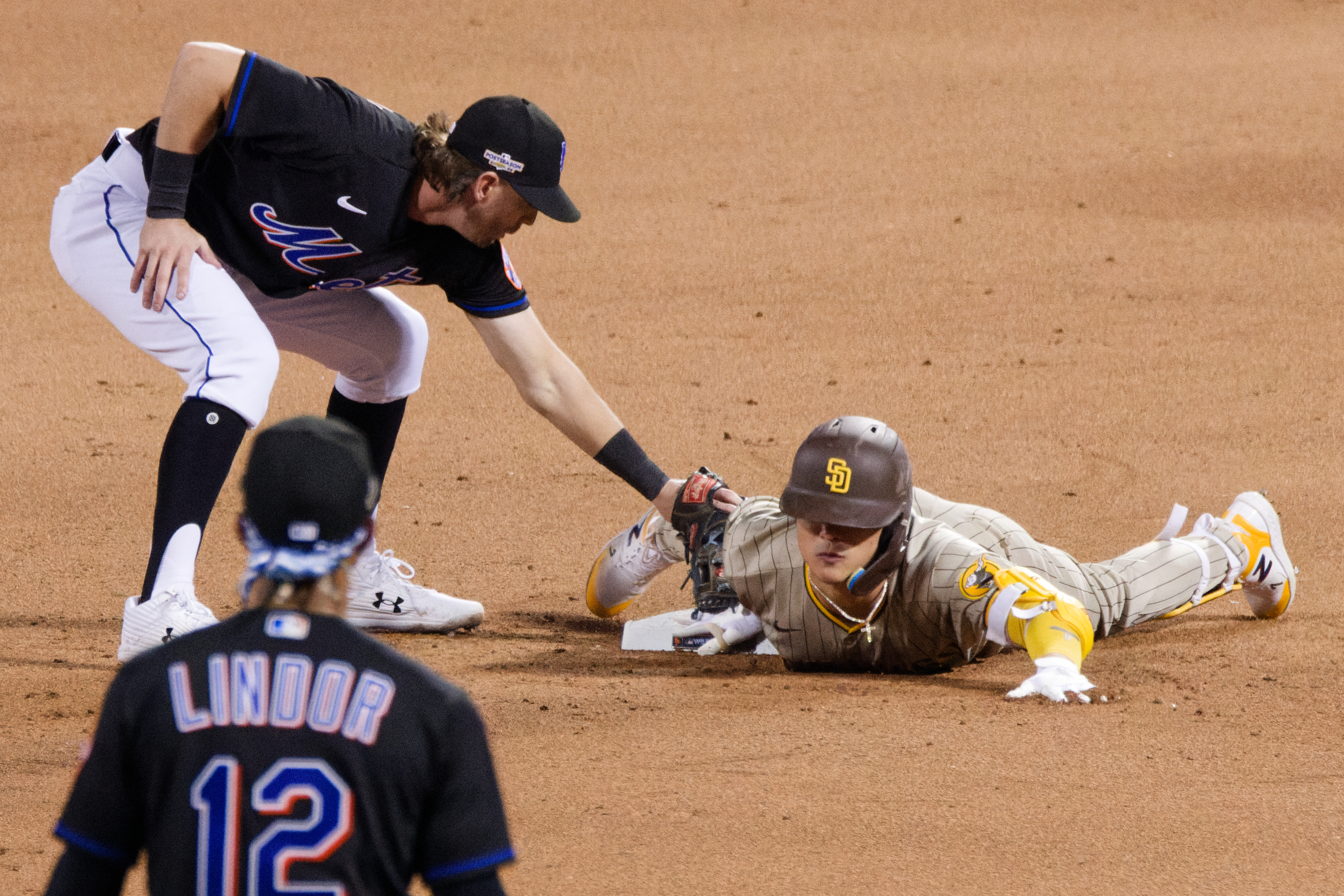
Jeff McNeil tagging out Kim in 2022

On August 26, 2022, Kim had a career-high five RBI against the Kansas City Royals. Kim finished the 2022 season with a .251 batting average, 11 home runs, 59 RBI, 12 stolen bases, and a .708 OPS in 150 games played. He mostly played as a shortstop, filling in for Tatís, who was suspended for performance-enhancing drugs.

On April 3, 2023, Kim hit his first MLB walk-off home run against the Arizona Diamondbacks following a solo home run by pinch hitter David Dahl. On July 24, Kim had his first MLB multi-home-run game against the Pittsburgh Pirates. On August 21, Kim hit his first major league grand slam against Miami Marlins pitcher Ryan Weathers. In 152 games for the Padres, Kim slashed .260/.351/.398 with 17 home runs, 60 RBI, and 38 stolen bases. After the 2023 season, Kim received the National League Gold Glove Award for utility players, becoming the first Korean player to win a Gold Glove.

On August 30, 2024, Kim won a lawsuit against ex-baseball player Lim Hye-dong for breach of contract. The Seoul Central District Court ordered Lim to pay 800 million South Korean won (US$594,000) to Kim. In 121 games for San Diego in 2024, he batted .233/.330/.370 with 11 home runs, 47 RBI, and 22 stolen bases. Due to shoulder surgery, Kim missed the Padres' 2024 postseason run. On October 3, 2024, Kim hired Scott Boras to represent him in free agency. Kim declined his portion of a mutual option on November 4, and became a free agent.

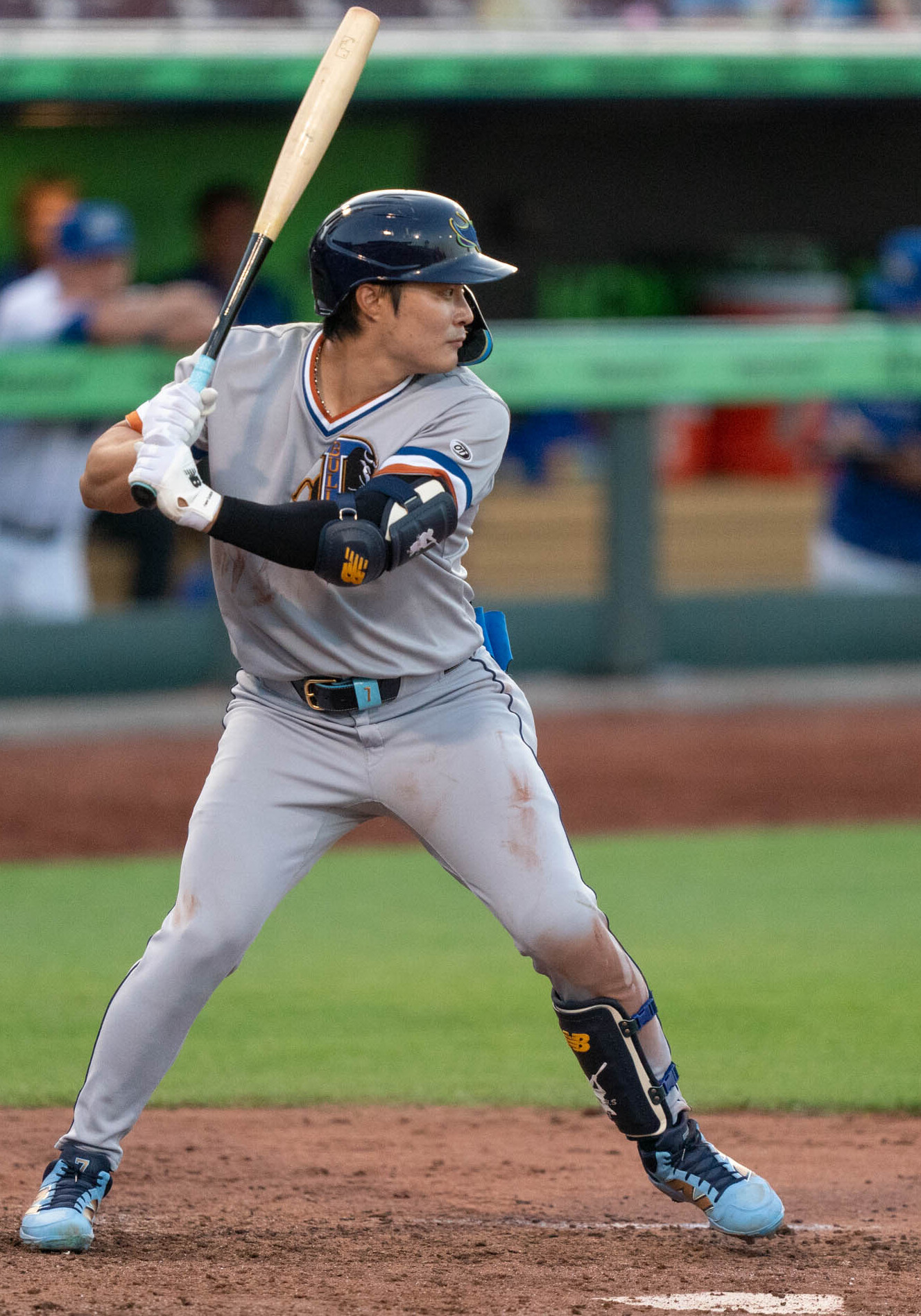
Kim batting in Triple-A in 2025

=== Tampa Bay Rays (2025) ===
On February 3, 2025, Kim signed a two-year, $29 million contract with the Tampa Bay Rays that included an opt-out clause after one season. He began the year on the IL as he continued to recover from shoulder surgery; he was transferred to the 60-day IL on May 9. On July 3, Kim was activated from the injured list to make his Rays debut. He returned to the injured list in late August due to back trouble.

=== Atlanta Braves (2025-Present) ===
On September 1, 2025, Kim was claimed off waivers by the Atlanta Braves. He started for the Braves at shortstop the following night. The next day, Kim hit his first home run as a Brave off of Chicago Cubs pitcher Drew Pomeranz. He finished the season with five home runs and 17 runs batted in. Following the season, Kim declined the mutual option in his contract and became a free agent.

On December 15, 2025, Kim re-signed with the Braves on a one-year contract worth $20 million. On January 18, 2026, it was reported that Kim would miss four to five months after undergoing hand surgery. The procedure was necessitated after Kim suffered a torn tendon in his right middle finger after falling on ice. Kim was activated for his season debut on May 11.

== International career ==
Kim played for the South Korea national baseball team at the 2013 18U Baseball World Cup, 2017 World Baseball Classic (WBC), 2017 Asia Professional Baseball Championship, 2018 Asian Games, 2019 WBSC Premier12, and 2023 WBC.

In 2013 18U Baseball World Cup, Kim batted .433, going 13-for-30, driving in three RBIs and scoring 9 runs. South Korea finished 5th in the tournament.

Kim was named the best shortstop of the 2019 Premier12.
