= Seiji Uebayashi =

Japanese baseball player (born 1995)

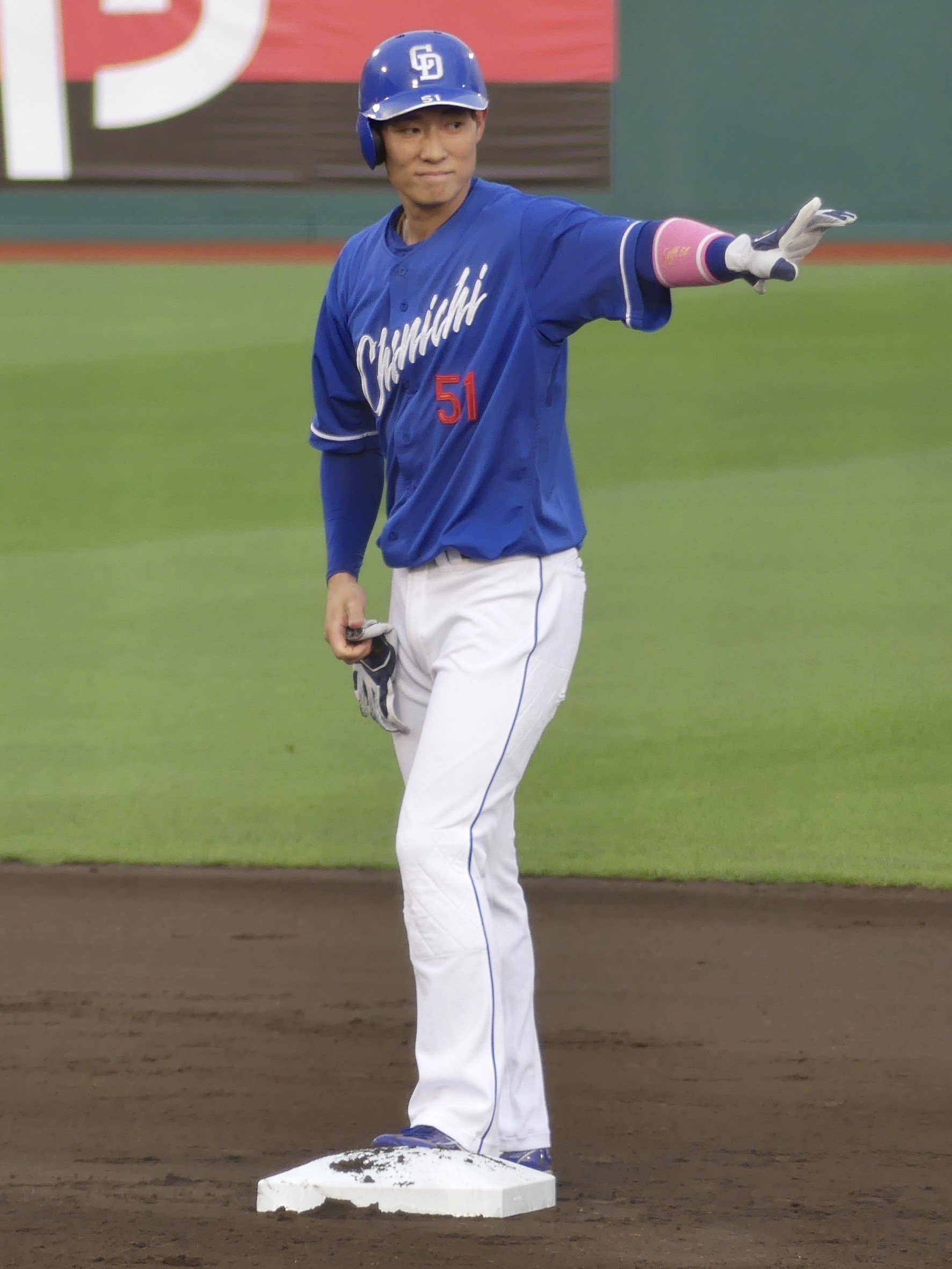
- Uebayashi with the Chunichi Dragons

Chunichi Dragons – No. 51
- Outfielder
- Born: August 1, 1995 (age 31); Saitama, Saitama, Japan
- Bats: Left Throws: Right

debut
- May 21, 2015, for the Fukuoka SoftBank Hawks

NPB statistics (through 2025 season)
- Batting average: .246
- Home runs: 75
- RBI: 258
- Stolen base: 75
- Stats at Baseball Reference

Teams
- Fukuoka SoftBank Hawks (2014–2023); Chunichi Dragons (2024–present)

Career highlights and awards
- 2x NPB All-Star (2017, 2025); 5× Japan Series champion (2015, 2017–2020)
Medals
Men's baseball
Representing Japan
U-18 Baseball World Cup
Silver medal – second place	2013 Taichung	Team
Asia Professional Baseball Championship
Gold medal – first place	2017 Tokyo	Team

Seiji Uebayashi (上林 誠知, Uebayashi Seiji; born August 1, 1995) is a Japanese profesisonal baseball outfielder for the Chunichi Dragons of Nippon Professional Baseball (NPB). He has previously played in NPB for the Fukuoka SoftBank Hawks.

== Early baseball career ==
Uebayashi participated with Takahiro Kumagai and Kosuke Baba in the 2nd grade summer the 94th Japanese High School Baseball Championship, 3rd grade spring the 85th Japanese High School Baseball Invitational Tournament and 3rd grade summer the 98th Japanese High School Baseball Championship at the Sendai Ikuei Gakuen High School.

== Professional career ==
=== Fukuoka SoftBank Hawks ===
On October 24, 2013, Uebayashi was drafted by the Fukuoka SoftBank Hawks in the 2013 Nippon Professional Baseball draft.

==== 2014–2015 season ====
In 2014 season, Uebayashi played in informal matches against Shikoku Island League Plus's teams and amateur baseball teams, and played in the Western League of NPB's minor leagues.

On May 21, 2015, Uebayashi debuted in the Pacific League against the Orix Buffaloes. And on August 25, he recorded his first hit and home run with a Grand slam against the Chiba Lotte Marines. Uebayashi played in the 2015 Pacific League Climax Series and the 2015 Japan Series in the postseason. On November 25, he was honored for the Western League Batting Leader Award, the Western League Most Stolen base Leader Award, the Western League Outstanding Player Award, the Western League Outstanding Performance Award, the Western League Rookie of the Year Award, and the Western League Expectation Award at the NPB AWARDS 2015. In 2015 season, Uebayashi played 15 games in the Pacific League.

==== 2016–2020 season ====
In 2016 season, Uebayashi played 14 games in the Pacific League.

In 2017 season, Uebayashi finished the regular season in 134 games with a batting average of .260, a 13 home runs, a RBI of 51, and a 12 stolen bases. And he played in the 2017 Pacific League Climax Series and the 2017 Japan Series in the postseason.

In 2018 season, Uebayashi played in all 143 games and recorded a batting average of .270, a 22 home runs, a RBI of 62, and a 13 stolen bases. And the 14th triple was the first record in 65 years in the NPB with the top result of the Pacific League in 2018. And he played in the 2018 Pacific League Climax Series and the 2018 Japan Series in the postseason.

In 2019 season, Uebayashi finished the regular season in 99 games with a batting average of .194, a 11 home runs, a RBI of 31, and a 10 stolen bases. And he played in the 2019 Pacific League Climax Series and the 2019 Japan Series in the postseason.

In 2020 season, Uebayashi finished the regular season in 69 games with a batting average of .181, a 6 home runs, a RBI of 20, and a 8 stolen bases. And he played in the 2020 Pacific League Climax Series and the 2020 Japan Series in the postseason.

==== 2021–2023 season ====
On June 29, 2021, Uebayashi was hit in the shoulder by a pitch in a farm game. He was later diagnosed with a fractured right shoulder blade, necessitating a recovery period of 4-6 weeks. As a result, he finished the regular season with only 39 appearances.

In 2022 season, Uebayasi had batted .301 with one home run and 12 RBI in 33 games to start the season. However, he injured his right leg in practice before a game against the Saitama Seibu Lions on May 18, and on May 20 he was diagnosed with a ruptured Achilles tendon that required four weeks of hospitalization and six months of rehabilitation, making it impossible for him to return during the season.

In 2023 season, Uebayashi finished the regular season in 56 games with a batting average of .185, a RBI of 9. On October 22, the Hawks announced release him.

=== Chunichi Dragons ===
On November 29, 2023, Uebayashi signed with the Chunichi Dragons.

== International career ==
In 2013, Uebayashi represented the Japan national baseball team at the 2013 18U Baseball World Cup.

On November 25, 2017, Uebayashi represented the Japan national baseball team at the 2017 Asia Professional Baseball Championship. In the match against South Korea national baseball team On November 16, he hit a three-run home run in the bottom of the tenth inning after the team lost three points in the top of the tenth inning.

On October 26, 2018, he was selected Japan national baseball team at the 2018 MLB Japan All-Star Series.

On February 27, 2019, he was selected for Japan national baseball team at the 2019 exhibition games against Mexico.
