= Interleague play (NPB) =

Baseball Game

The 2021 season logo for interleague play sponsored by Nippon Life

Interleague play (セ・パ交流戦, Se・Pa kōryū-sen), officially titled Nippon Life Interleague Play for event sponsor Nippon Life, is an event consisting of 108 regular-season baseball games played between Central League (CL) and Pacific League (PL) teams in Nippon Professional Baseball (NPB).

Prior to 2005, matchups between CL and PL teams occurred only during spring training, the All-Star Series, a short-lived exhibition tournament called the Suntory Cup, and the Japan Series. Central League teams were reluctant to implement regular-season interleague play, as it would reduce the money generated from games played against the Yomiuri Giants, the hugely popular CL team that generates the most money in Japanese baseball.

However, during the 2004 NPB realignment, the merger of two PL teams that were struggling financially, the rumor of a second PL team merger, and talks of contracting and restructuring the two-league system into one ten-team league prompted the suggestion of interleague play as a possible solution. Team representatives eventually approved one merger, agreed to maintain the two-league system, and approved to hold interleague regular-season games during the 2005 season.

Originally, each team played 36 games against teams in the other league. Two years later, interleague play was cut to 24 games per team for the 2007 season. The amount of interleague regular-season games was again reduced for the start of the 2015 season to 18 games per team where it has remained through today. Interleague play is a single event within the regular season with all games being played during a three-week block beginning in late May. Each CL and PL team plays a three-game series at home against half the teams in the opposing league and a three-game set on the road against the other half. Each consecutive season, teams switch these home-and-away roles. The designated hitter is implemented when PL clubs are the home team.

Since its implementation, the Pacific League has won more games against the Central League every year except three, the 2009, 2021, and 2022 seasons. At the conclusion of interleague play, the team with the best winning percentage during the event is named the winner; a PL team has come out on top every season but four. The event's sponsor also announces three player awards: one interleague Most Valuable Player (MVP) award and two Nippon Life Awards, one from each league.

== History ==
Unlike Major League Baseball (MLB), Nippon Professional Baseball (NPB) does not require teams to participate in revenue sharing strategies that would help correct the revenue imbalances between teams because of game attendance and television broadcasting contracts. These issues are problematic because the Yomiuri Giants, a team in the Central League (CL) and NPB's most popular team, generates revenue much easier than any other team. Daily Yomiuri baseball reporter Jim Allen has estimated that the Giants account for 40% of all NPB television broadcasting revenue, while the eleven remaining teams accounted for the other 60%. Because of this imbalance, Pacific League (PL) team owners had lobbied the commissioner's office and the CL owners for years to introduce interleague play into the regular season, however CL teams rejected the idea. They believed that if PL teams were allowed to play against the Giants, the remaining five CL teams would lose home games against Yomiuri and the sellout crowds and prime time TV and radio broadcasting rights money along with them. Additionally, Giants' owner Tsuneo Watanabe did not want his team competing against the PL teams.

=== Suntory Cup ===
Sponsored by Suntory, the Suntory Cup was a preseason interleague tournament created to serve as a test run for regular-season interleague play. It was held only twice, once before the 1999 and 2000 seasons. The tournament consisted of a series of exhibition games between CL and PL teams. After each team played one game against all six teams in the other league, the team with the highest winning percentage was declared the winner. All of the games featured the designated hitter rule and any game tied at the end of nine innings resulted in a draw. Among other payouts, the winning team received ¥10 million of the ¥34.6 million purse and the most valuable player of the series took home ¥2 million.

=== Discussion and approval ===
Talk of introducing interleague play as regular season games emerged again before the 2004 season. In February, Keio University professor Masaru Ikei wrote an op-ed in the Sankei Shimbun detailing proposals that would help revive Japanese baseball; interleague play was his first idea. A few weeks later, Commissioner of Baseball Yasuchika Negoro expressed interest in exploring the idea of in-season interleague games and was willing to discuss the idea with general managers and team owners.

During the 2004 Nippon Professional Baseball realignment, the planned merger of two PL teams, the Kintetsu Buffaloes and the Orix BlueWave, along with the rumor of a second PL team merger in the near future prompted talk of possibly contracting and restructuring the two-league system into one ten-team league. If NPB was restructured in this way, every team would be playing every other team throughout the regular season. Instead of this restructuring, Hanshin Tigers' president Katsuyoshi Nozaki proposed interleague play as a possible alternative solution. He claimed that interleague play would allow Central and Pacific League teams to play each other an equal number of times so that it would seem that it was a one-league system, however the All-Star Series and the Japan Series, two series played between teams and players from the opposing leagues, could be saved. Eventually, team representatives approved the merger between the Buffaloes and BlueWave but also agreed to maintain the two-league system while still looking into introducing interleague games for the next season. During an owners meeting on September 29, 2004, a plan was approved to hold interleague regular-season games during the 2005 season.

=== Interleague play introduced ===
Nippon Professional Baseball first implemented regular-season interleague games in the 2005 season. Thirty-six interleague games were played by all twelve teams during a single six-week block between May 6 and June 16 and the event was sponsored by Nippon Life. Each team in the Central and Pacific Leagues played three home and three away games against each club from the opposing league. All series during this period consisted of three games. For any weekend rainouts in any outdoor ballparks, Mondays served as makeup days. The four days between the end of interleague play on June 16 and resuming the regular intraleague schedule on June 21 were left open to accommodate any additional makeup games.

After two seasons, the number of interleague games played by each team was reduced from 36 to 24. CL representatives pushed for a reduction in games because they believed that the four off days needed to potentially replay postponed games were too many. Each of the twelve series was reduced from three to two games. For only the 2014 season, the 10th season featuring interleague play, NPB inverted the designated hitter rule. Instead of the designated hitter being used in games where the Pacific League team was the home team, it was in effect in Central League parks. Later that same season, it was announced that the interleague schedule would again be changed for a third time starting with the 2015 season. Again, the CL was unhappy with the interleague schedule. They cited the frequent travel required for the shorter two-game series of the 24-game format as the reason for the change. CL officials used the increased frequency of games being played by the Japan national baseball team as leverage in the negotiations, and argued that the international competitions required a more efficient NPB schedule. Interleague play was again reduced, this time from 24 to 18 games for each team. Due to the COVID-19 pandemic, NPB decided to cancel interleague play for the 2020 season. The cancellation marked the first time since its inception that interleague games would not be held and was an effort to maximize the number of regular-season intraleague games that could be played during the shortened season. Cancellations and modifications of both the All-Star Series and Climax Series were also eventually announced for the same reasons.

== Current format and rules ==
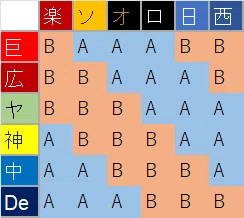
Interleague play stadium

Interleague play is treated as its own event with definitive start and end dates within the regular season. All 108 interleague games are played in a three-week block beginning in late May. Ever since the 2015 season, each CL and PL team plays 18 games via a three-game series at home against half the teams in the opposing league and a three-game set on the road against the other half. Each consecutive season, teams switch these home-and-away roles.

The Central League president is the authority for games played in the CL stadiums, and the Pacific League chairman oversees contests where the PL club is the home team. Likewise, the designated hitter rule is implemented when PL clubs are the home team, however pitchers bat when the traditional style of nine-man baseball is played when a CL team hosts the game. The PL rule of announcing starting pitchers the day before game day was not in effect regardless of where the games are played, and two umpires from each league work the games.

== Records and awards ==
Since interleague play's implementation in the 2005 season, the Pacific League has won more games against the Central League every season except for three, the 2009, 2021, and 2022 seasons. At its conclusion, the team with the best winning percentage during the event is named the winner; a PL team has come out on top every season but four. Of those four CL champions, none of them are based outside of Tokyo Prefecture. All 6 Pacific League teams have won at least one Interleague Play championship. The event's sponsor, Nippon Life, also announces several awards, all of which are accompanied by a monetary prize. Player awards include one interleague Most Valuable Player (MVP) award and two Nippon Life Awards, one from each league. A monetary prize is also distributed to the winning team. In some past seasons, teams that placed in the top-six at the end of the event were also awarded money.

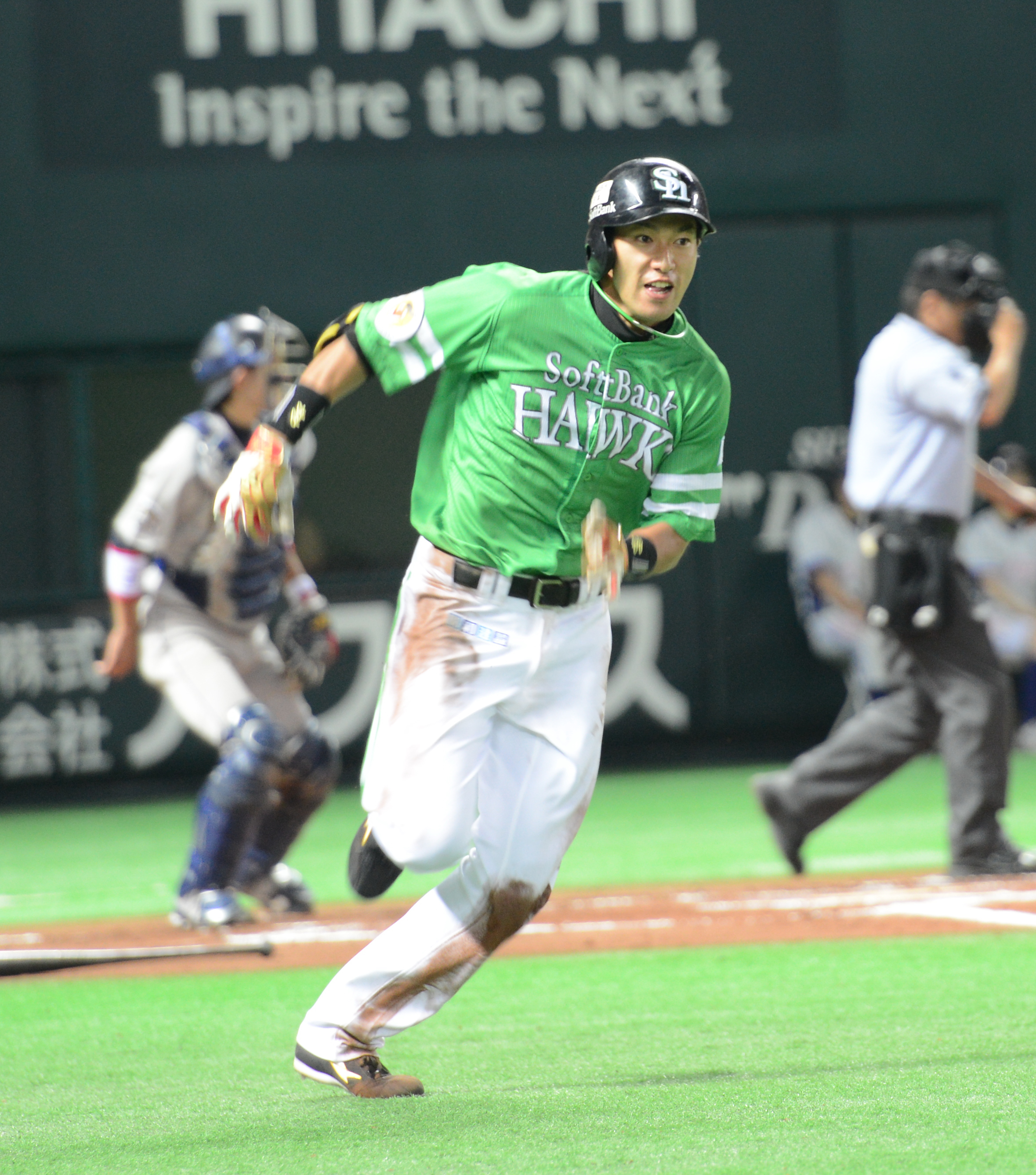
Yuki Yanagita is the only player to win the event's MVP award twice.

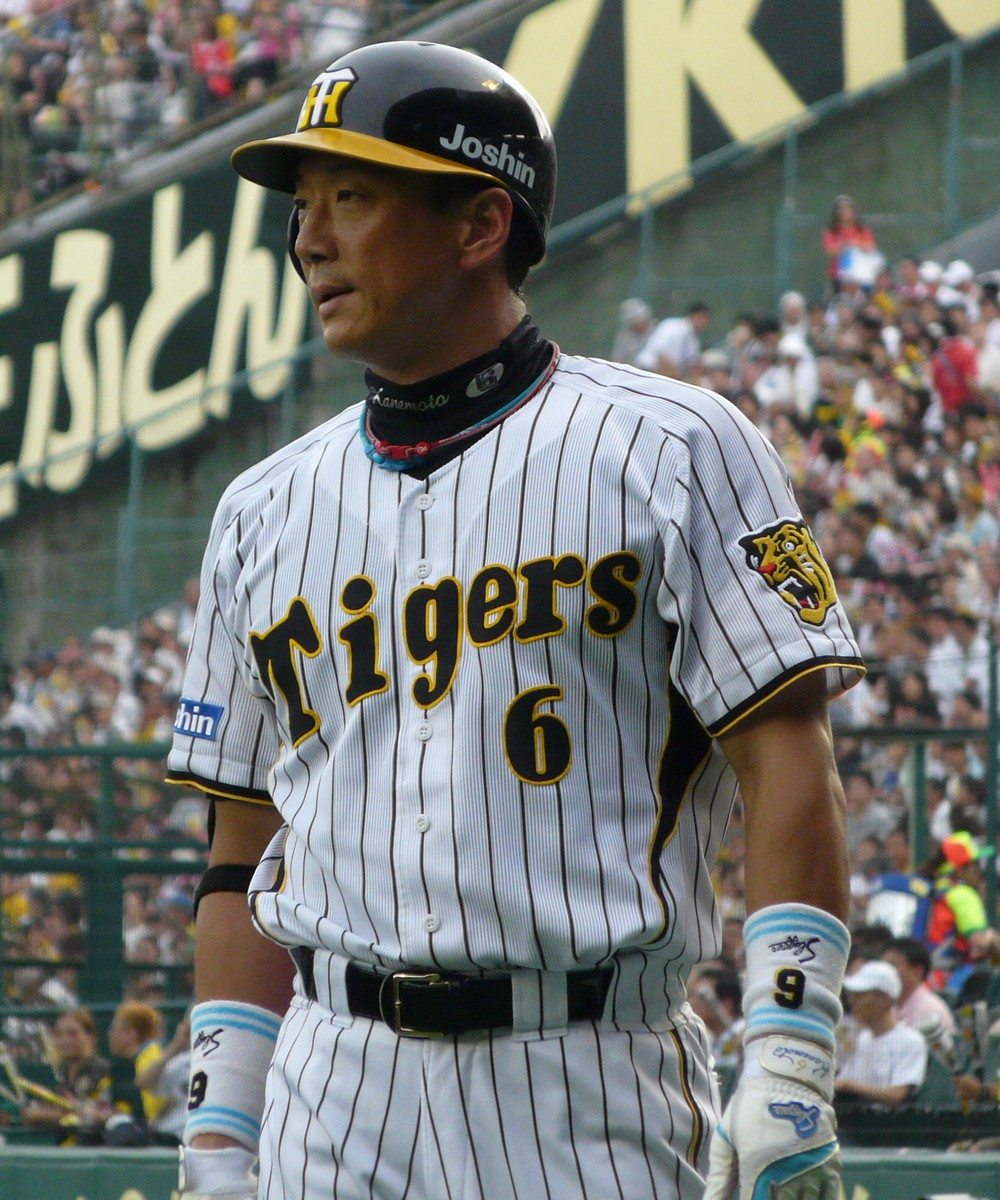
Tomoaki Kanemoto is the only player to win multiple CL Nippon Life Awards, winning them in 2005 and 2008.

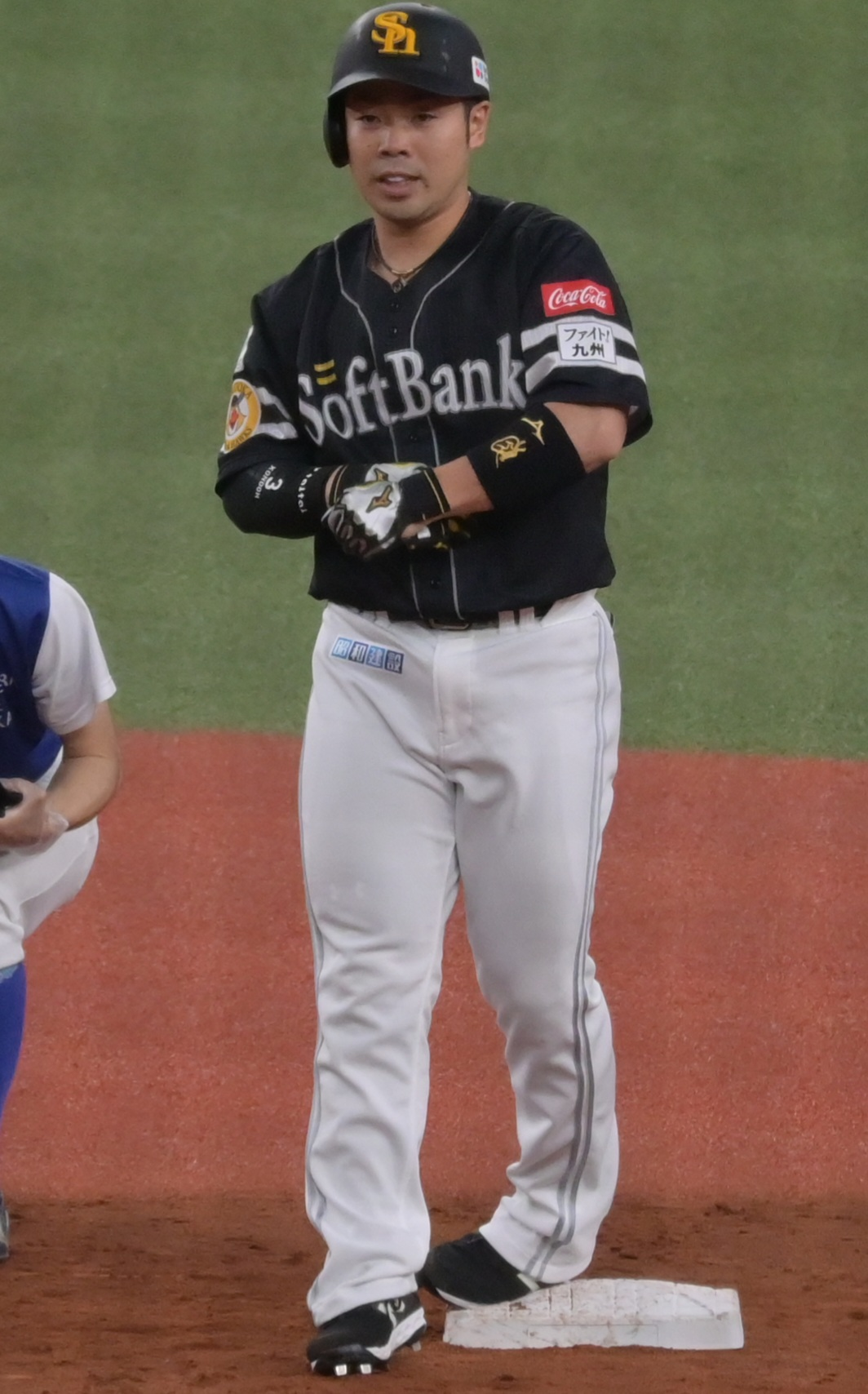
Kensuke Kondoh is the only player to win multiple PL Nippon Life Awards, winning them in back to back seasons in 2023 and 2024.

Yearly interleague records and awards
| Season | Total games | CL wins | PL wins | Ties | Winning team | Most Valuable Player | CL Nippon Life Award winner | PL Nippon Life Award winner | Notes |
|---|---|---|---|---|---|---|---|---|---|
| 2005 | 216 | 104 | 105 | 7 | Chiba Lotte Marines^{‡} | Hiroyuki Kobayashi* | Tomoaki Kanemoto | Takeya Nakamura | |
| 2006 | 216 | 107 | 108 | 1 | Chiba Lotte Marines^{‡} | Masahide Kobayashi* | Mitsuru Sato* | Nobuhiko Matsunaka | |
| 2007 | 144 | 66 | 74 | 4 | Hokkaido Nippon-Ham Fighters^{‡} | Ryan Glynn* | Hisanori Takahashi* | Saburo Omura | |
| 2008 | 144 | 71 | 73 | 0 | Fukuoka SoftBank Hawks^{‡} | Munenori Kawasaki | Tomoaki Kanemoto (2) | Hisashi Iwakuma* | |
| 2009 | 144 | 70 | 67 | 7 | Fukuoka SoftBank Hawks^{‡} | Toshiya Sugiuchi* | Tony Blanco | Yu Darvish* | |
| 2010 | 144 | 59 | 81 | 4 | Orix Buffaloes^{‡} | Takahiro Okada | Shinnosuke Abe | Tsuyoshi Wada* | |
| 2011 | 144 | 57 | 78 | 9^{[a]} | Fukuoka SoftBank Hawks^{‡} | Seiichi Uchikawa | Tetsuya Utsumi* | Tomotaka Sakaguchi | |
| 2012 | 144 | 66 | 67 | 11^{[a]} | Yomiuri Giants^{†} | Tetsuya Utsumi* | Toshiya Sugiuchi* | Mitsuo Yoshikawa* | |
| 2013 | 144 | 60 | 80 | 4 | Fukuoka SoftBank Hawks^{‡} | Yuya Hasegawa | Atsushi Nomi* | Masahiro Tanaka* | |
| 2014 | 144 | 70 | 71 | 3 | Yomiuri Giants^{†} | Yoshiyuki Kamei | Tetsuto Yamada | Takahiro Norimoto* | |
| 2015 | 108 | 44 | 61 | 3 | Fukuoka SoftBank Hawks^{‡} | Yuki Yanagita | Kazuhiro Hatakeyama | Yusei Kikuchi* | |
| 2016 | 108 | 47 | 60 | 1 | Fukuoka SoftBank Hawks^{‡} | Ryuma Kidokoro | Seiya Suzuki | Shohei Ohtani* | |
| 2017 | 108 | 51 | 56 | 1 | Fukuoka SoftBank Hawks^{‡} | Yuki Yanagita (2) | Yoshihiro Maru | Go Matsumoto | |
| 2018 | 108 | 48 | 59 | 1 | Tokyo Yakult Swallows^{†} | Masataka Yoshida | Taichi Ishiyama* | Ayumu Ishikawa* | |
| 2019 | 108 | 46 | 58 | 4 | Fukuoka SoftBank Hawks^{‡} | Nobuhiro Matsuda | Yuya Yanagi* | Daichi Suzuki | |
| 2020 | Interleague play canceled because of the COVID-19 pandemic | | | | | | | | |
| 2021 | 108 | 49 | 48 | 11^{[b]} | Orix Buffaloes^{‡} | Yoshinobu Yamamoto* | Dayán Viciedo | Hiromi Itoh* | |
| 2022 | 108 | 55 | 53 | 0 | Tokyo Yakult Swallows^{†} | Munetaka Murakami | Yusuke Oyama | Yutaro Sugimoto | |
| 2023 | 108 | 52 | 54 | 2 | Yokohama DeNA BayStars^{†} | Kazuma Okamoto | Shugo Maki | Kensuke Kondoh | |
| 2024 | 108 | 52 | 53 | 3 | Tohoku Rakuten Golden Eagles^{‡} | Shun Mizutani | Hiroto Saiki* | Kensuke Kondoh (2) | |
| 2025 | 108 | 43 | 63 | 2 | Fukuoka SoftBank Hawks^{‡} | Tatsuru Yanagimachi | Yūki Okabayashi | Tomohisa Ohzeki* | |
| 2026 | 108 | 39 | 65 | 4 | Saitama Seibu Lions^{‡} | Shinya Hasegawa | Haruto Takahashi* | Ryoya Kurihara | |
| Overall | 2,772 | 1,255 | 1,434 | 82 | Winning League: Pacific League 18, Central League 3 | | | | |

BOLD Indicates the league had the most wins
† Indicates Central League team
‡ Indicates Pacific League team
^{a} In an effort to conserve power after the 2011 Tōhoku earthquake and tsunami, games did not enter a new extra inning after a game's length reached three and a half hours.
^{b} Extra innings were eliminated and all games concluded after nine innings due to the COVID-19 pandemic.
* Indicates the player was a pitcher
(#) Indicates number of times winning MVP Award (if multiple winner)

== See also ==
- Interleague play – Major League Baseball's iteration of the interleague system
