= Makoto Kadowaki =

Japanese baseball player (born 2001)

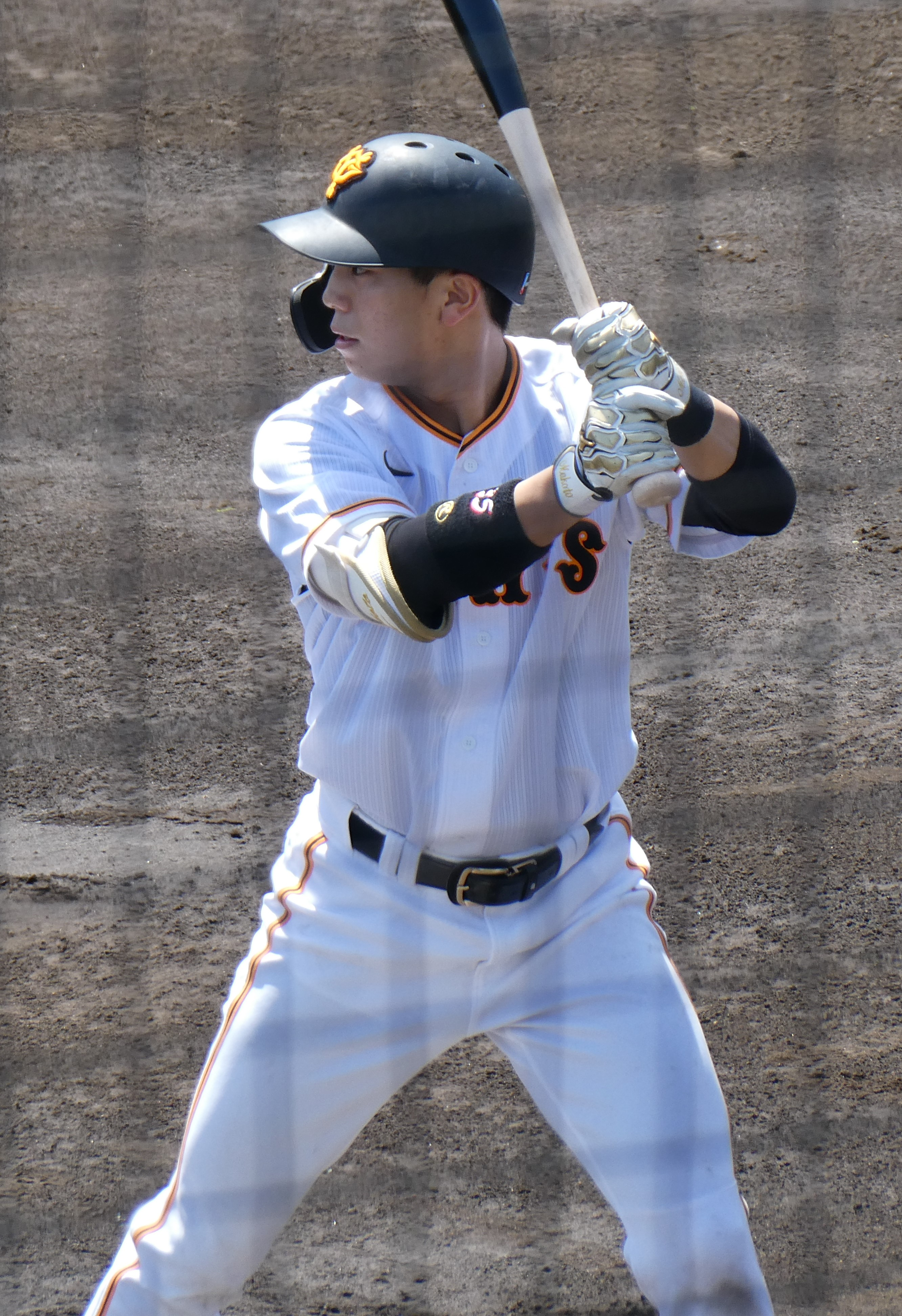

Yomiuri Giants – No. 5
- Infielder
- Born: January 24, 2001 (age 25); Nara, Nara, Japan
- Bats: Left Throws: Right

NPB debut
- April 2, 2023, for the Yomiuri Giants

NPB statistics (through 2023 season)
- Batting average: .263
- Home runs: 3
- RBI: 21
- Hits: 83
- Stolen base: 11
- Sacrifice bunt: 14

Teams
- Yomiuri Giants (2023–present)

Career highlights and awards
- Asia Professional Baseball Championship MVP (2024)

Makoto Kadowaki (門脇 誠, Kadowaki Makoto; born January 24, 2001 in Nara, Nara, Japan) is a professional Japanese baseball player. He plays infielder for the Yomiuri Giants.

He played for Samurai Japan in the 2024 Asia Professional Baseball Championship, and hit a walk-off single in the finals against South Korea, and also winning MVP of the tournament.
