= Shim Jae-min =

South Korean baseball player (born 1994)

Lotte Giants – No. 39
- Pitcher
- Born: February 18, 1994 (age 32)
- Bats: Right Throws: Left

KBO debut
- March 28, 2015, for the KT Wiz

KBO statistics (through 2023 season)
- Win–loss record: 16–21
- Earned run average: 4.77
- Strikeouts: 249
- Stats at Baseball Reference

Teams
- KT Wiz (2015–2018, 2021–2023); Lotte Giants (2023–present)

- Shim Jae-min
- Hangul: 심재민
- Hanja: 沈載敏
- RR: Sim Jaemin
- MR: Sim Chaemin

Shim Jae-min (Korean: 심재민; born February 18, 1994, in Busan) is a South Korean pitcher. He bats right-handed and throws left-handed.

== Professional career ==
In the 2014 KBO Draft, Shim was selected by the KT Wiz as the first overall pick, along with Yu Hui-woon.
