= Yoshinori Murata =

Japanese baseball player (born 1974)

Yomiuri Giants – No. 74
- Catcher / Coach
- Born: April 24, 1974 (age 51); Sasebo, Nagasaki, Japan
- Batted: Right Threw: Right

NPB debut
- October 3, 1995, for the Yomiuri Giants

Last NPB appearance
- October 11, 2008, for the Yomiuri Giants

NPB statistics (through 2008)
- Batting average: .213
- Home runs: 6
- Hits: 132
- Stats at Baseball Reference

Teams
- As player: Yomiuri Giants (1993–2008); As coach: Yomiuri Giants (2016–2017, 2019–present)

Yoshinori Murata (村田 善則, Murata Yoshinori; born April 24, 1974 in Sasebo, Nagasaki, Japan) is a former Nippon Professional Baseball catcher.
