= Jung Hyun =

South Korean baseball player

SSG Landers – No. 6
- Infielder
- Born: June 1, 1994 (age 31); Busan, South Korea
- Bats: Right Throws: Right

KBO debut
- July 10, 2013, for the Samsung Lions

KBO statistics (through July 27, 2019)
- Batting average: .274
- Home runs: 9
- Runs batted in: 55
- Stats at Baseball Reference

Teams
- Samsung Lions (2013–2014); KT Wiz (2017–2018); SK Wyverns / SSG Landers (2019–present)

- Korean name
- Hangul: 정현
- Hanja: 鄭炫
- RR: Jeong Hyeon
- MR: Chŏng Hyŏn

Jung Hyun (Korean: 정현; born June 1, 1994) is a baseball infielder for the SSG Landers of the KBO League. He graduated Busan High School. He joined the Samsung Lions in 2013, and in 2014 he transferred to KT Wiz.
