= Shuta Tonosaki =

Japanese baseball player (born 1992)

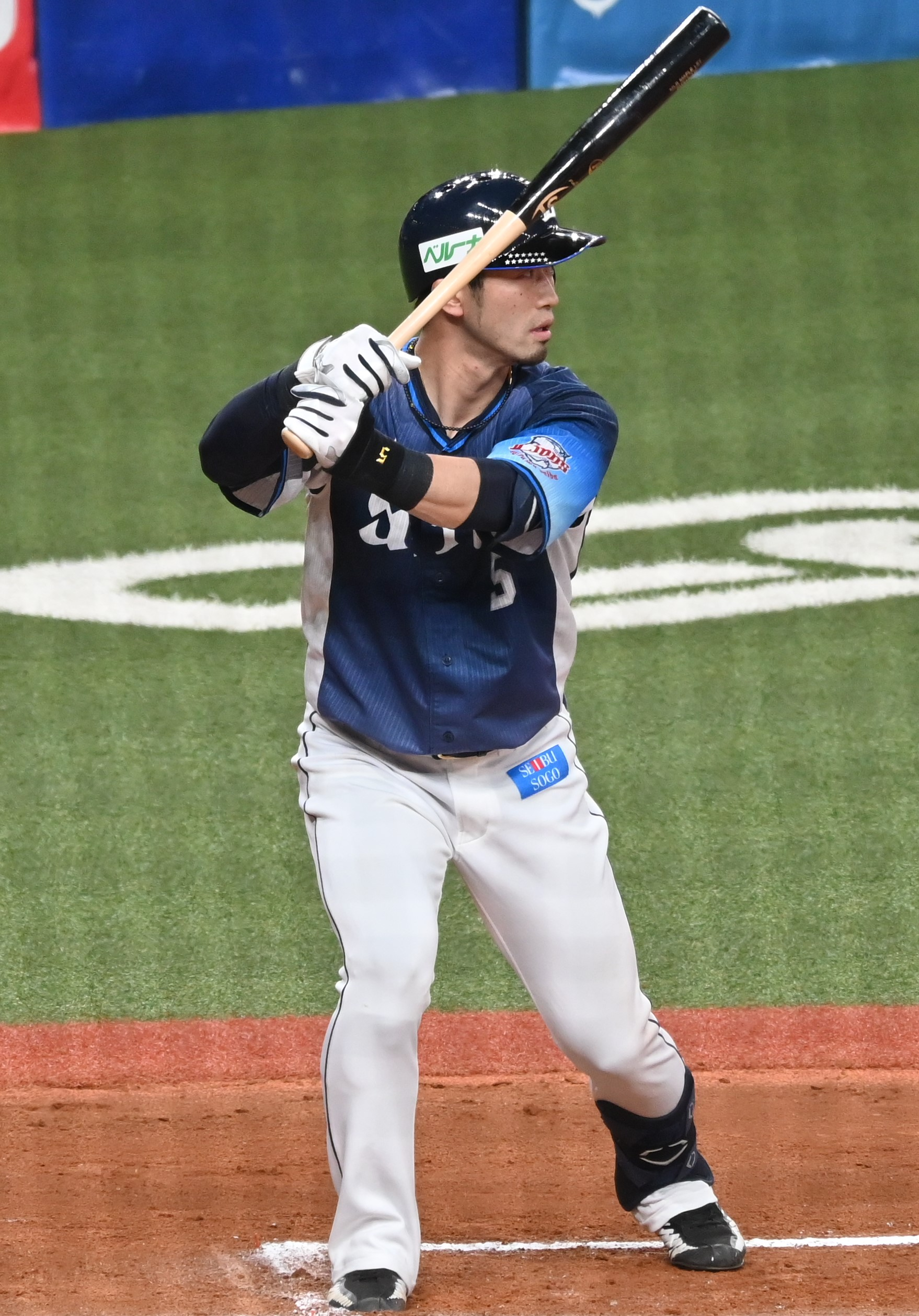

Saitama Seibu Lions – No. 5
- Utility player
- Born: December 20, 1992 (age 33); Hirosaki, Aomori, Japan
- Bats: Right Throws: Right

NPB debut
- July 8, 2015, for the Saitama Seibu Lions

NPB statistics (through 2024 season)
- Batting average: .248
- Home runs: 101
- RBI: 418
- Stolen bases: 162
- Stats at Baseball Reference

Teams
- Saitama Seibu Lions (2015–present)

Career highlights and awards
- 3× NPB All-Star (2018, 2023, 2024); Asia Professional Baseball Championship MVP (2017)
Medals
Men's baseball
Representing Japan
WBSC Premier12
Gold medal – first place	2019 Tokyo	Team

Shuta Tonosaki (外崎 修汰, Tonosaki Shūta; born December 20, 1992 in Hirosaki, Aomori, Japan), nicknamed "Apple Punch", is a Japanese professional baseball infielder for the Saitama Seibu Lions of Nippon Professional Baseball (NPB).

== Career ==
He was selected 2018 NPB All-Star game.

Tonosaki was also named an All–Star in 2023.

== International career ==
Tonosaki represented the Japan national baseball team in the 2017 Asia Professional Baseball Championship, 2018 MLB Japan All-Star Series and 2019 WBSC Premier12.

On October 10, 2018, he was selected Japan national baseball team at the 2018 MLB Japan All-Star Series.

On October 1, 2019, he was selected at the 2019 WBSC Premier12.
