= Kim Myeong-sin =

South Korean baseball player (born 1993)

Doosan Bears – No. 46
- Pitcher
- Born: November 29, 1993 (age 32); Daegu, South Korea
- Bats: Right Throws: Right

KBO League debut
- April 1, 2017, for the Doosan Bears

KBO statistics (through 2025 season)
- Win–loss record: 14–11
- Earned run average: 4.48
- Strikeouts: 249
- Stats at Baseball Reference

Teams
- Doosan Bears (2017, 2020–present)

Kim Myeong-shin (Korean: 김명신; born November 29, 1993) is a South Korean professional baseball pitcher who is currently playing for the Doosan Bears of KBO League. He graduated from Kyungsung University (경성대학교; 慶星大學校) and was selected to Doosan Bears by a draft in 2017.(2nd draft, 2nd round)

== Career Records ==
Year	Team	ERA	G	CG	SHO	W	L	SV	HLD	WPCT	PA	IP	H	HR	BB	HBP	K	R	ER
2017	Doosan Bears	4.37	39	0	0	3	1	0	5	0.750	200	45.1	54	2	12	7	38	23	22
