= Tsuyoshi Ishizaki =

Japanese baseball player (born 1990)

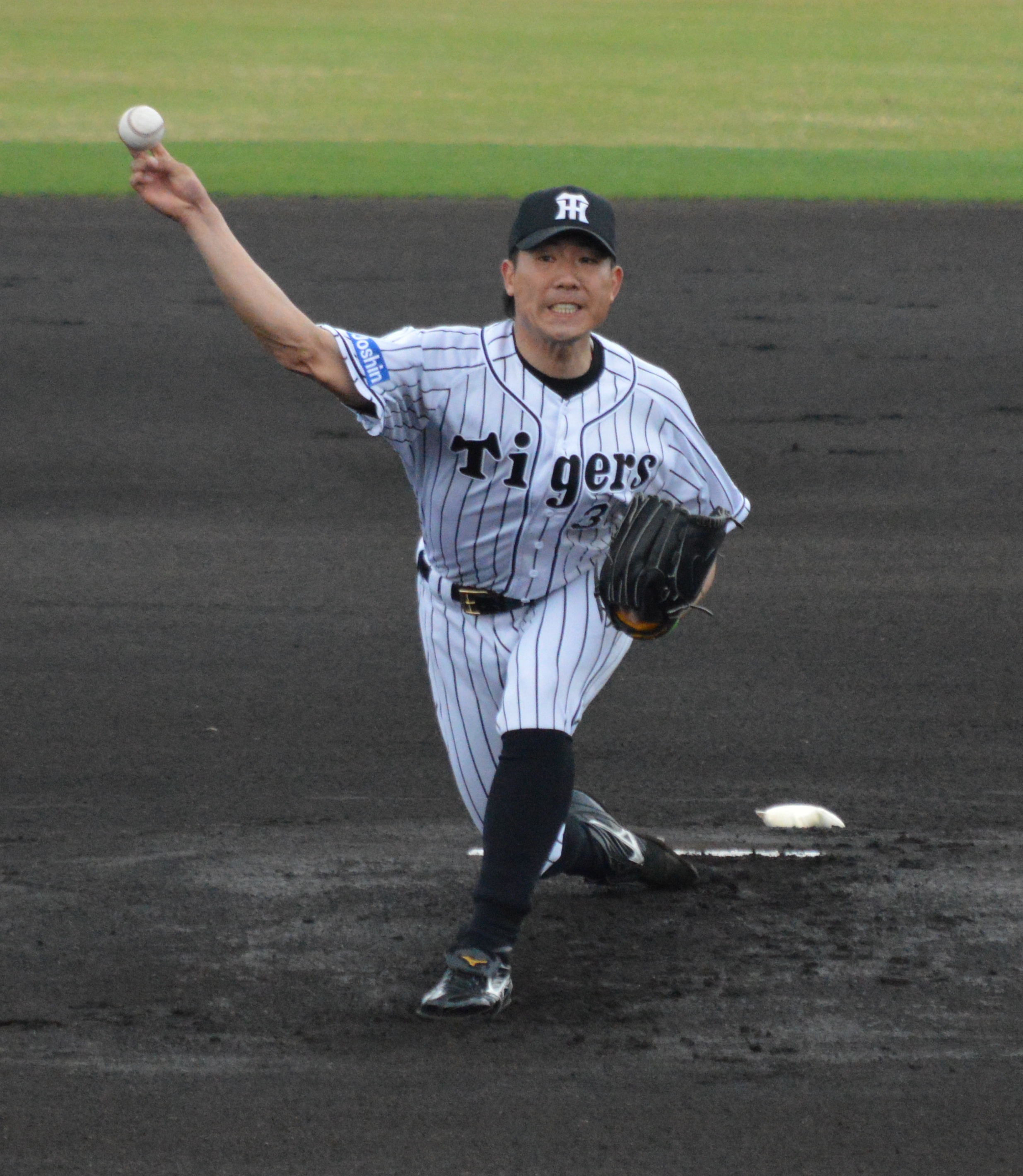
- Ishizaki with the Hanshin Tigers
- Pitcher
- Born: September 9, 1990 (age 35); Koga, Ibaraki
- Batted: Right Threw: Right

debut
- March 29, 2015, for the Hanshin Tigers

Last appearance
- September 19, 2020, for the Chiba Lotte Marines

NPB statistics (through 2020 season)
- Win–loss record: 1–2
- ERA: 4.13
- Strikeouts: 91
- Stats at Baseball Reference

Teams
- Hanshin Tigers (2015–2019); Chiba Lotte Marines (2019–2021)

Tsuyoshi Ishizaki (石崎 剛, Ishizaki, Tsuyoshi; born September 9, 1990) is a Japanese Nippon Professional Baseball former player.

== Early baseball career ==
A native of Ibaraki, Ishizaki started playing baseball in grade school and continued until he entered Sanwa High School. His school made it to the 3rd round of the prefectural tournament, but failed to make it to Koshien. During that time, his fastballs already sparked the interest of some scouts as they reached the 145 km/h levels. However, in the end, none of the 12 NPB teams drafted him when he graduated from high school.

Wanting to pursue a career in baseball, he joined the industrial leagues under Shin Nittetsu Sumikin Kashima. However, he began experiencing lower back pain shortly after he joined the team. Apparently, this was brought about by the strain that resulted from his overhead pitching form. As a solution, he decided to alter his delivery form to a lower arm angle. With a stroke of luck, the altered form worked to his advantage, bringing his pitches to a maximum of 151 km/h, making him indispensable to the team.

== Professional career ==
=== Hanshin Tigers ===
In October 2014, he was chosen as the Hanshin Tigers 2nd pick in the 2014 Nippon Professional Baseball draft. He signed with the Tigers on November 17 for an estimated 12 million yen annual salary, and a 70 million yen signing bonus. He was assigned the jersey number 30.

His teammate from Shin Nittetsu, Yuya Yokoyama was the Tigers' first pick during the same draft, making them the first players from the same team to be drafted as the 1st and 2nd picks in franchise history, and the first pitchers from the same team to be drafted as such in NPB history.

==== 2015 ====
He debuted as a reliever during the March 29 opening card with the Dragons in Kyocera Dome, where he retired 3 consecutive batters in the 8th inning, helping the Tigers sweep their opponent in their first 3 games for the season.

=== Chiba Lotte Marines ===
On July 4, 2019, Ishizaki was traded to the Chiba Lotte Marines in exchange for Keisuke Takano.

== Playing Style ==
With a three-quarter right-handed side throw, his fastballs register up to 151 km/h on the radar gun. And while he can deliver a slider and occasional change-up, he relied mostly on his fastballs during his career in the industrial leagues.
