= Kensuke Kondoh =

Japanese baseball player (born 1993)

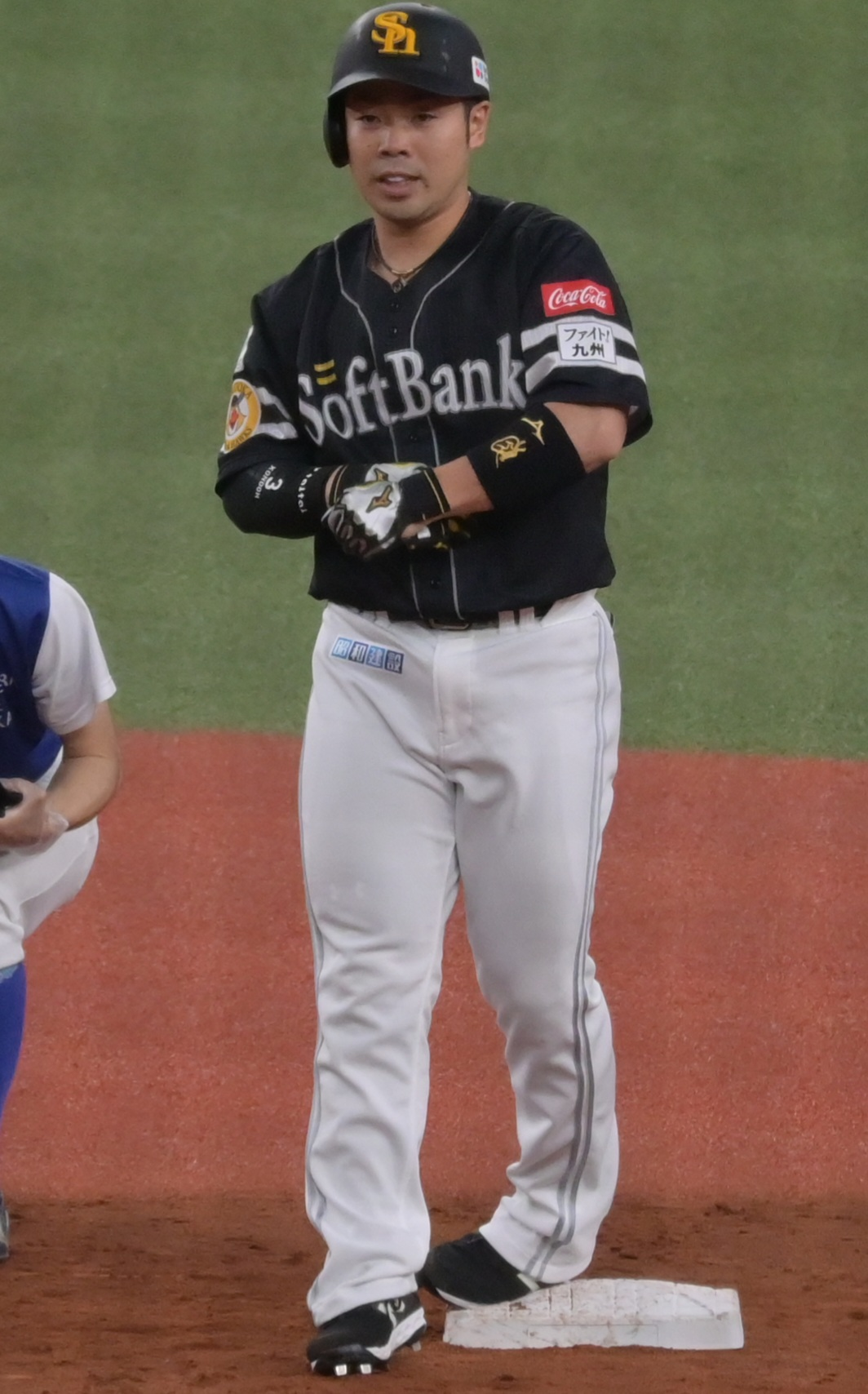
- Kondoh with the Fukuoka SoftBank Hawks

Fukuoka SoftBank Hawks – No. 3
- Catcher / Outfielder / Third baseman
- Born: August 9, 1993 (age 32); Midori-ku, Chiba, Japan
- Bats: Left Throws: Right

NPB debut
- July 4, 2012, for the Hokkaido Nippon-Ham Fighters

NPB statistics (through 2025 season)
- Batting average: .307
- Home runs: 107
- Runs batted in: 646
- Hits: 1,379
- Stats at Baseball Reference

Teams
- Hokkaido Nippon-Ham Fighters (2012–2022); Fukuoka SoftBank Hawks (2023–present)

Career highlights and awards
- Pacific League MVP (2024); Pacific League home run leader (2023); Pacific League RBI leader (2023); Pacific League Batting Leader (2024); 5× Pacific League Best Nine Award (2018, 2020, 2021, 2023, 2024); Pacific League Golden Glove Award (2023); 6× NPB All-Star (2017–2019, 2021, 2023, 2024); NPB All-Star Fighting-spirit player Award (2023); 2× Japan Series champion (2016, 2025)
Medals
Men's baseball
Representing Japan
World Baseball Classic
| Gold medal – first place | 2023 Miami | Team |
Summer Olympics
| Gold medal – first place | 2020 Tokyo | Team |
WBSC Premier12
| Gold medal – first place | 2019 Tokyo | Team |

Kensuke Kondoh (近藤 健介, Kondō Kensuke; born August 9, 1993) is a Japanese professional baseball catcher, outfielder, and third baseman for the Fukuoka SoftBank Hawks of Nippon Professional Baseball (NPB). He has previously played in NPB for the Hokkaido Nippon-Ham Fighters.

== Career ==
=== Hokkaido Nippon-Ham Fighters ===
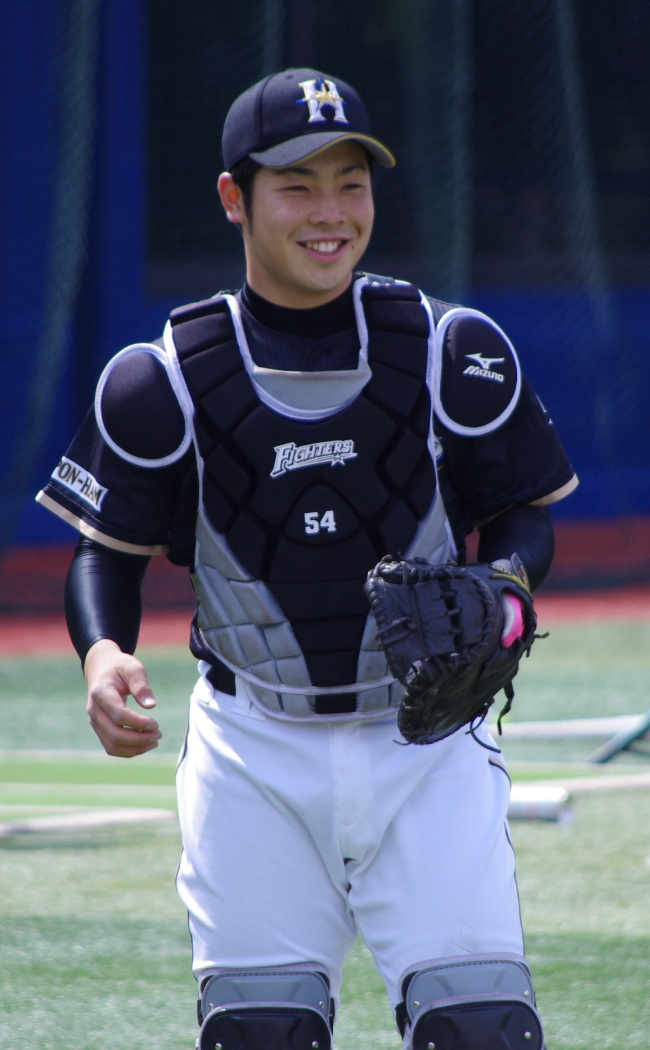
Kondoh with the Nippon-Ham Fighters

On October 27, 2011, Kondoh was drafted in the fourth round by the Hokkaido Nippon-Ham Fighters in the 2011 Nippon Professional Baseball draft.

He debuted in 2012 season with the Nippon-Ham Fighters, batting 5-for-26. He did not fare much better in the Pacific League in 2013, batting .152 in 32 games, spending more time in the minors.

On May 30, 2014, Kondoh hit a grand slam in interleague play against the Tokyo Yakult Swallows at the age of 20 years and 9 months, making him the youngest player in the Pacific League. He finished the 2014 regular season batting .258/.295/.386, with 4 home runs, and 28 RBIs in 89 games.

While not accumulating enough plate appearances to qualify for the batting title, Kondoh hit .413 in 2017 in 57 games.

The following season, Kondoh was selected NPB All-Star Series for the first time. In 2018, he finished the regular season batted .323/.427/.457 (second in on-base percentage (OBP) in the Pacific League) with 9 home runs and 69 RBIs in 129 games. He was named to the Pacific League Best Nine Award for the first time.

On July 12, 2019, Kondoh participated the All-Star Game for the second time. In 2019, he batted .304/.422/.400 in 138 games. He was honored as the Pacific League OBP Leader Award for the first time at the NPB Awards.

In 2020, Kondoh finished the regular season batting .340 (third in the Pacific League), leading the league with a .465 OPB, along with 5 home runs and 60 RBIs in 108 games. He received the Pacific League Best Nine Award for the second time.

In 2021, Kondoh finished the regular season batting .298/.413/.472, with 11 home runs and 69 RBIs in 133 games. He was named to his second consecutive the Pacific League Best Nine Award.

On August 9, 2022, Kondoh recorded his first walk-off home run in a win against the Saitama Seibu Lions. He finished the 2022 regular season batting .302/.418/.462, with 11 home runs and 69 RBIs in 99 games.

=== Fukuoka SoftBank Hawks ===
On December 12, 2022, Kondoh signed with the Fukuoka SoftBank Hawks on a seven-year contract worth 5 billion yen. He would wear the uniform number 3.

In 2023, Kondoh had career bests in almost every statistical category, finishing second in the Pacific League with a .303 batting average and leading the league with a .431 OBP and .528 slugging percentage. He set the single-season Hawks franchise record for walks with 109, hit a career-high 26 home runs, 87 RBI, and played in all 143 games for the first time in his career. He also won the Outstanding Player Award for his batting average of .413, 5 home runs, and 15 RBIs in interleague play. In addition, he was named an All-Star for the third time, and won the a Fighting-spirit player Award in Game 1 of the All-Star Series. This campaign got him close to winning an offensive Triple Crown, which would have made him the first player to top all three categories in the Pacific League since Nobuhiko Matsunaka in 2004. However a breakout season by Yuma Tongu ending in a close race for the batting title, which prevented Kondoh from winning. Kondoh won the Pacific League Home Run Leader Award, the RBI Leader Award, his third Pacific League OBP Leader Award, his fourth the Best Nine Award, and the Pacific League Golden Glove Award at the NPB Awards.

Kondoh played in 129 games for Fukuoka in 2024, slashing .314/.439/.521 with 19 home runs, 72 RBI, and 11 stolen bases. He was named the Pacific League MVP.

Kondoh made 75 appearances for Fukuoka in 2025, slashing .301/.410/.492 with 10 home runs and 41 RBI. With the Hawks, Kondoh won the 2025 Japan Series.

== International career ==
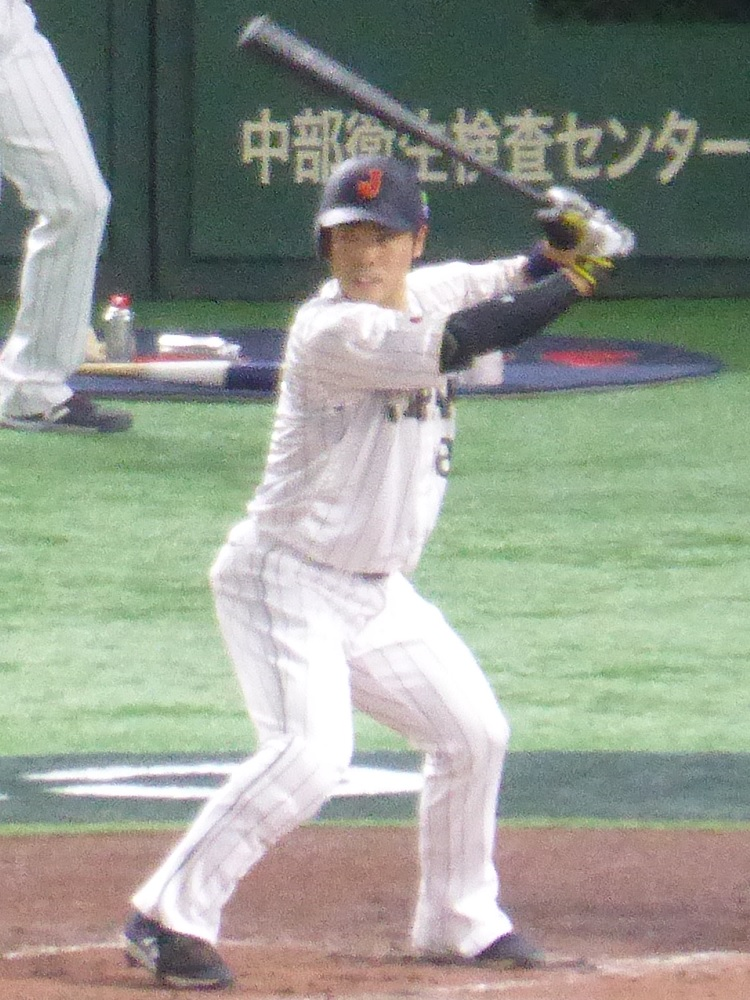
Kondoh with Japan during the 2023 WBC at the Tokyo Dome

Kondoh represented Japan's national baseball team in the 2017 Asia Professional Baseball Championship, 2019 exhibition games against Mexico, and 2019 WBSC Premier12. He led the Premier12 with nine walks.

On January 6, 2023, Kondoh was chosen to participate 2023 World Baseball Classic. He contributed to the team's championship with a .346 batting average, .500 OBP, and 2 home runs.
