= Go Matsumoto =

Japanese baseball player (born 1993)

- Matsumoto with the Yomiuri Giants

Yomiuri Giants
- Infielder / Outfielder
- Born: August 11, 1993 (age 33); Kawaguchi, Saitama, Japan
- Bats: Right Throws: Right

NPB debut
- October 4, 2013, for the Hokkaido Nippon-Ham Fighters

NPB statistics (through August 1, 2026)
- Batting average: .266
- Home runs: 15
- Runs batted in: 170
- Stats at Baseball Reference

Teams
- Hokkaido Nippon-Ham Fighters (2013–2025); Yomiuri Giants (2026)

Career highlights and awards
- Interleague play PL Nippon Life Award Winner (2017); 2× NPB All-Star (2022, 2023); Pacific League Best Nine Award (2022); Pacific League Batting Leader (2022)

Go Matsumoto (松本 剛, Matsumoto Gō) (born August 11, 1993) is a Japanese professional baseball infielder and outfielder for the Yomiuri Giants of Nippon Professional Baseball (NPB). He has previously played in NPB for the Hokkaido Nippon-Ham Fighters.

== Career ==
Matsumoto was a member of the 2006 Little League World Series team from Japan which ultimately lost the world championship to the team from Columbus, Georgia.

=== Hokkaido Nippon-Ham Fighters ===
Matsumoto played for the Hokkaido Nippon-Ham Fighters from 2013 to 2025. Of the five at-bats in his rookie season, none were successful hits.

Matsumoto made 773 total appearances for the Fighters during his 12 seasons with the club, batting .265/.317/.330 with 14 home runs and 157 RBI.

=== Yomiuri Giants ===
On November 25, 2025, Matsumoto agreed to a contract with the Yomiuri Giants.
