= Asia Professional Baseball Championship =

International baseball competition

- Most recent season or competition: 2026 Asia Professional Baseball Championship
- Sport: Baseball
- Founded: 2017; 9 years ago
- First season: 2017
- No. of teams: 4
- Countries: Japan; South Korea; Taiwan; Australia
- Venue: (Japan) Tokyo (2017/2023/2026)
- Continent: Asia Oceania
- Most recent champion: Japan (3rd title)
- Most titles: Japan (3 titles)

The Asia Professional Baseball Championship (APBC) is a World Baseball Softball Confederation-sanctioned international baseball competition and organized with the Chinese Professional Baseball League, Korea Baseball Organization and Nippon Professional Baseball leagues. from 2023, Baseball Australia and the Australian Baseball League were also invited as co-organizers, expanding the competition to a four-nation tournament.

The tournament was organized for the first time in 2017 and is contested by the U-23 national teams of Japan, South Korea, Australia and Taiwan. In the case of Taiwan, the national team plays under the banner and name of Team Taiwan, rather than Chinese Taipei, unlike other WBSC sanctioned tournaments.

Alongside the Asia Winter Baseball League, the APBC serves as successor to the heritage of the defunct and inactive Asia Series.

== Finals results ==
Season	Host city	Champions	Score	Runners-up	MVP	No. of teams
2017; Details	(Japan); Tokyo	Japan	7–0	South Korea	(Japan) Shuta Tonosaki	3
2023; Details	(Japan); Tokyo	Japan	4–3	South Korea	(Japan) Makoto Kadowaki	4
2026; Details	(Japan); Tokyo	Japan	5–1	South Korea	(Japan) Rui Muneyama	4
