= Ryōma Nishikawa =

Japanese baseball player (born 1994)

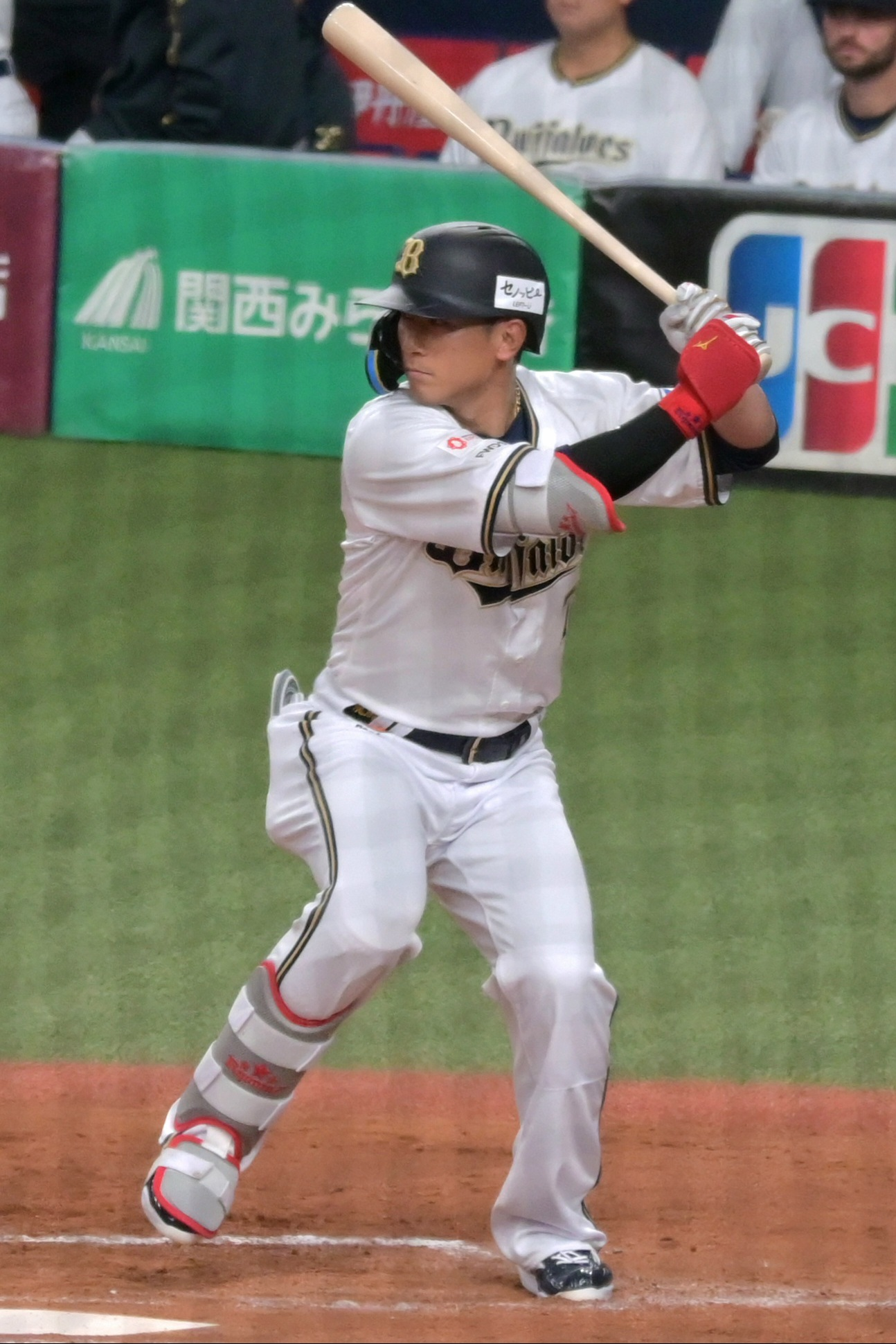

Orix Buffaloes – No. 7
- Outfielder
- Born: December 10, 1994 (age 31); Osaka, Osaka, Japan
- Bats: Left Throws: Right

NPB debut
- March 26, 2016, for the Hiroshima Toyo Carp

NPB statistics (through 2025 season)
- Batting average: .295
- Hits: 1,069
- Home runs: 76
- Runs batted in: 427
- Stats at Baseball Reference

Teams
- Hiroshima Toyo Carp (2016–2023); Orix Buffaloes (2024–present)

Career highlights and awards
- NPB All-Star (2025)

Ryōma Nishikawa (西川 龍馬, Nishikawa Ryōma; born December 10, 1994) is a Japanese baseball outfielder for the Orix Buffaloes of Nippon Professional Baseball (NPB).
