= 2015 Nippon Professional Baseball draft =

2015 Nippon Professional Baseball Draft
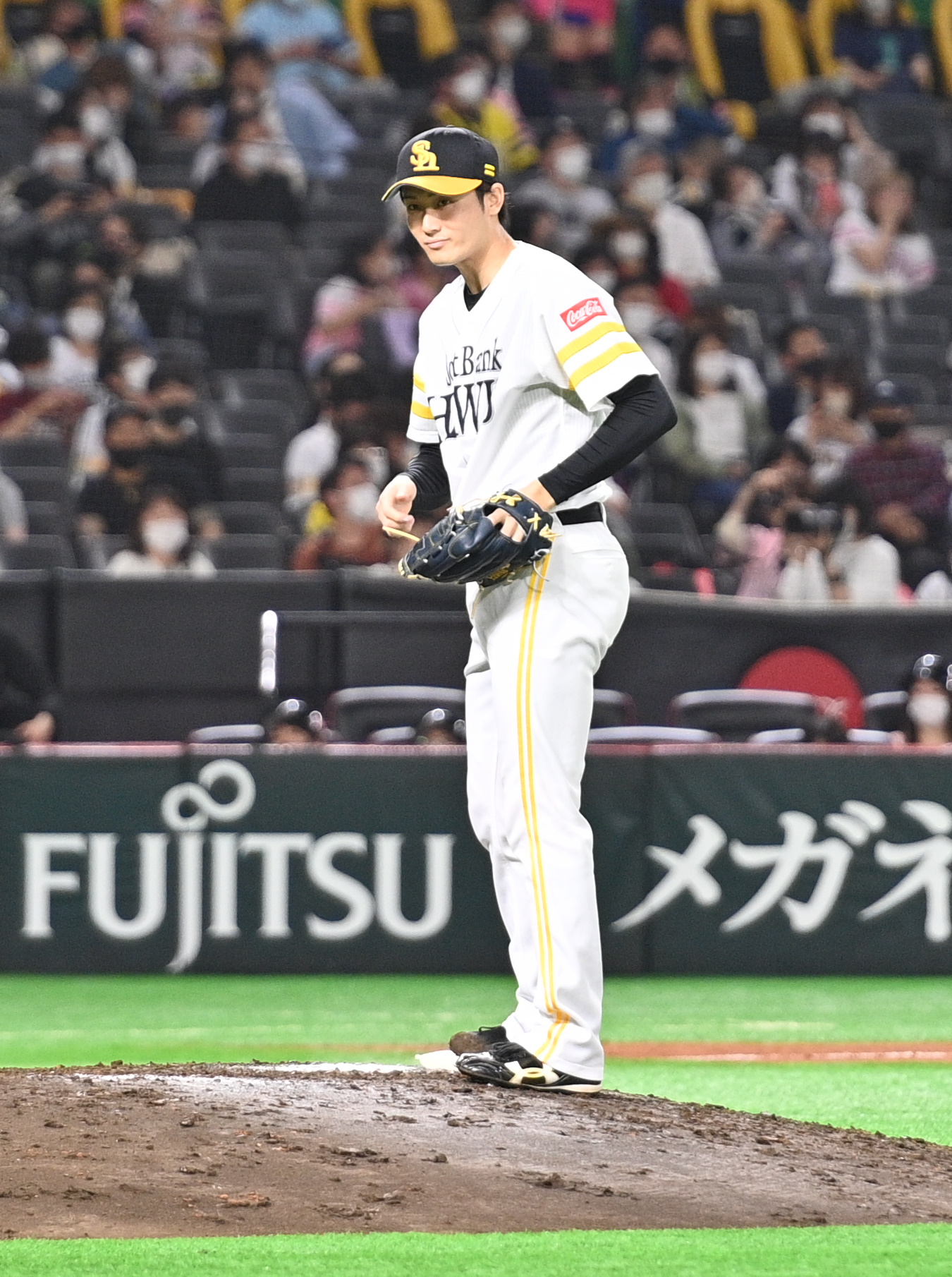
- Jumpei Takahashi, who was nominated and a bid lottery for by three teams.

General information
- Sport: Baseball
- Date: October 22, 2015
- Location: Grand Prince Hotel Takanawa, Tokyo
- Networks: TBS (first round), sky-A
- Sponsored by: Taisho Pharmaceutical

Overview
- 116 total selections in 18 (Includes draft for developmental players) rounds
- League: Nippon Professional Baseball
- First round selections: Jumpei Takahashi; Taiga Hirasawa; Shun Takayama

The 2015 Nippon Professional Baseball (NPB) Draft was held on October 22, 2015, for the 51st time at the Grand Prince Hotel Takanawa to assign amateur baseball players to the NPB. It was arranged with the special cooperation of Taisho Pharmaceutical Co. with official naming rights. The draft was officially called "The Professional Baseball Draft Meeting supported by Lipovitan D".

== Summary ==
This was the third year in a row that Taisho Pharmaceuticals had been a partner for the NPB draft and as such one of their most prominent products "Lipovitan D" was used in the official name becoming "Professional Baseball Draft meeting supported by Lipovitan D."

Only the first round picks were allowed to be contested with all picks from the second round onward being based on table placing in the 2015 NPB season in a waiver system. Waiver priority was changed from All-Star game results to inter-league results. As the Pacific League teams came out on top with 61 wins, 44 losses and 3 draws against Central League opposition, Pacific League teams were given preference. From the third round the order was reversed continuing in the same fashion until all picks were exhausted.

For the first time since 1974, the Yomiuri Giants were without a manager present at the draft. In the previous instance, that year's manager Tetsuharu Kawakami was to be replaced by Shigeo Nagashima who was absent due to his participation in the MLB Japan All-Star Series having still been an active player.

88 new players were signed at the draft with a further 28 development player contracts decided on.

=== Lottery Mistake ===
In the competition for the signature of Meiji University's Shun Takayama between Tokyo Yakult Swallows and the Hanshin Tigers there was an error leading to some trouble at the meeting.

At the lottery, both team managers Tomoaki Kanemoto and Mitsuru Manaka both pulled their tickets and it was Manaka who pulled his ticket first mistaking the draft logo for the "winning" stamp, raising his fist in a victory pose. Kanemoto, after seeing the Swallows manager's delight, felt that he had lost and went back to his seat without checking his ticket.

After checking the "winning" ticket, NPB officials realized immediately that there had been a mistake but before other officials could check the Hanshin ticket, an interview with Manaka had already started. In regards to this, NPB secretary general Atsuhi Iihara later apologized "we should have stopped the interview but we couldn't. It was a clumsy piece of work." After it was confirmed that Hanshin had indeed won the rights to negotiate, Kanemoto laughingly remarked "it was like a home run that had been taken away by video replay."

In the aftermath, Takayama made comment that "it was a meeting where you didn't now what was going to happen, I certainly didn't, but I'm very appreciative to have been selected in the first round of picks." The mistaken Manaka, commented "please return my celebration." As a result of the systems trouble, the draft was delayed by 10 minutes.

== First Round Contested Picks ==
	Player name	Position	Teams selected by
First Round	**Jumpei Takahashi**	Pitcher	Dragons, Fighters, **Hawks**
First Round	**Taiga Hirasawa**	Infielder	Eagles, **Marines**
First Round	**Shun Takayama**	Outfielder	**Tigers**, Swallows
Second Round	**Shinnosuke Ogasawara**	Pitcher	**Dragons**, Fighters

- **Bolded** teams indicate who won the right to negotiate contract following a lottery.
- In the first round, **Taiga Hirasawa** (Infielder) was selected by the **Marines**, **Shota Imanaga** (Pitcher) by the **BayStars**, **Shinsaburo Tawata** (Pitcher) by the **Lions**, **Akitake Okada** (Pitcher) by the **Carp**, and **Toshiki Sakurai** (Pitcher) by the **Giants** without a bid lottery.
- In the second round, **Louis Okoye** (Outfielder) was selected by the **Eagles** without a bid lottery.
- In the thrird round, the last remaining the **Fighters**, selected **Kenta Uehara** (Pitcher).
- List of selected players.

== Selected Players ==
Key
*	Player did not sign

- The order of the teams is the order of second round waiver priority.
- **Bolded** After that, a developmental player who contracted as a registered player under control.
- List of selected players.

=== Tohoku Rakuten Golden Eagles ===
Pick	Player name	Position	Team
#1	Louis Okoye	Outfielder	Kanto Daiichi High School
#2	Ryota Yoshimochi	Infielder	Osaka University of Commerce
#3	Eigoro Mogi	Infielder	Waseda University
#4	Kengo Horiuchi	Catcher	Shizuoka Senior High School
#5	Ryota Ishibashi	Pitcher	Honda
#6	Yuichi Adachi	Catcher	Panasonic
#7	Itsuki Murabayashi	Infielder	Otsuka Senior High School
Developmental Player Draft
#1	Takumi Deguchi	Infielder	Tsuda Gakuen High School
#2	Hiroki Yamada	Infielder	Komono High School

=== Yokohama DeNA BayStars ===
Pick	Player name	Position	Team
#1	Shota Imanaga	Pitcher	Komazawa University
#2	Kento Kumabara	Pitcher	Sendai University
#3	Tatsuhiro Shibata	Infielder	Kokugakuin University
#4	Yasutaka Tobashira	Catcher	NTT West Japan
#5	Kakeru Ayabe	Pitcher	Kasumigaura High School
#6	Koki Aoyagi	Outfielder	Osaka Toin High School
#7	Takuto Nogawa	Pitcher	Saginomiya Seisakusho
Developmental Player Draft
#1	Keisho Amiya	Catcher	Chiba Eiwa High School
#2	Musashi Yamamoto	Infielder	Kyushu International University Senior High School
#3	**Joh Tamura**	Pitcher	Kwansei Gakuin University

=== Orix Buffaloes ===
Pick	Player name	Position	Team
#1	Masataka Yoshida	Outfielder	Aoyama Gakuin University
#2	Taisuke Kondoh	Pitcher	Panasonic
#3	Koji Ohshiro	Infielder	Rikkyo University
#4	Daiki Aoyama	Pitcher	Toyota Motors
#5	Ryo Yoshida	Pitcher	Tokai Sagami High School
#6	Sena Sato	Pitcher	Sendai Ikuei High School
#7	Kohei Suzuki	Infielder	Mitsubishi Heavy Industries Nagoya
#8	Ryuta Kadoya	Pitcher	J-Project Corp
#9	Ken Akama	Pitcher	Saginomiya Seisakusho
#10	Yutaro Sugimoto	Outfielder	JR East
Developmental Player Draft
#1	**Takayuki Tsukada**	Pitcher	Hakuoh University
#2	Kosuke Akamatsu	Catcher	Kagawa Olive Guyners

=== Chunichi Dragons ===
Pick	Player name	Position	Team
#1	Shinnosuke Ogasawara	Pitcher	Tokai Sagami High School
#2	Yu Satoh	Pitcher	Tohoku Fukushi University
#3	Takuya Kinoshita	Catcher	Toyota Motors
#4	Hiroto Fuku	Pitcher	JR Kyushu
#5	Toshiki Abe	Infielder	Honda
#6	Ryota Ishioka	Infielder	JR East
Developmental Player Draft
#1	Seiya Nakagawa	Pitcher	Aichi University
#2	Shu Yoshida	Pitcher	Tokushima Indigo Socks
#3	**Takuya Mitsuma**	Pitcher	Musashi Heat Bears
#4	Mikihiro Nishihama	Pitcher	Seijoh University
#5	Kaito Goya	Pitcher	Hachinohe Gakuin Kosei High School
#6	**Masaru Watanabe**	Outfielder	Tokai University

=== Saitama Seibu Lions ===
Pick	Player name	Position	Team
#1	Shinsaburo Tawata	Pitcher	Fuji University
#2	Seiji Kawagoe	Pitcher	Hokkai Gakuen University
#3	Shogo Noda	Pitcher	Seino Transportation
#4	Aito Ohtaki	Outfielder	Hanasaki Tokuharu High School
#5	Tadasuke Minamikawa	Pitcher	JR Shikoku
#6	Keisuke Honda	Pitcher	Tohoku Gakuin University
#7	Nien Ting Wu	Infielder	Daiichi Institute of Technology
#8	Tsubasa Kokuba	Pitcher	Daiichi Institute of Technology
#9	Koki Fujita	Pitcher	Hirosaki Technical High School
#10	Naoaki Matsumoto	Pitcher	Kagawa Olive Guyners

=== Hiroshima Toyo Carp ===
Pick	Player name	Position	Team
#1	Akitake Okada	Pitcher	Osaka University of Commerce
#2	Hiroki Yokoyama	Pitcher	NTT East Japan
#3	Mikiya Takahashi	Pitcher	Hanamaki East High School
#4	Ryota Funakoshi	Catcher	Oji Paper Company
#5	Ryoma Nishikawa	Infielder	Oji Paper Company
#6	Oscar Nakaoshi	Pitcher	Honda
#7	Riku Aoki	Infielder	Yamagata Chuo High School

=== Chiba Lotte Marines ===
Pick	Player name	Position	Team
#1	Taiga Hirasawa	Infielder	Sendai Ikuei High School
#2	Ryota Sekiya	Pitcher	JR East
#3	Kakeru Narita	Pitcher	Akita Commerce & Business High School
#4	Taiki Tojo	Pitcher	JR East
#5	Shu Hara	Pitcher	Senshu University Matsudo Senior High School
#6	Akifumi Shigaraki	Pitcher	Miyazaki Umeda Gakuen
#7	Keisuke Takano	Pitcher	JR West
Developmental Player Draft
#1	**Takamasa Ohki**	Infielder	Kagawa Olive Guyners
#2	**Tomoya Kakinuma**	Catcher	Nihon University College of International Relations

=== Hanshin Tigers ===
Pick	Player name	Position	Team
#1	Shun Takayama	Outfielder	Meiji University
#2	Seishiro Sakamoto	Catcher	Meiji University
#3	Daichi Takeyasu	Pitcher	Kumamoto Golden Larks
#4	Atsushi Mochizuki	Pitcher	Yokohama So-Gakukan High School
#5	Koyo Aoyagi	Pitcher	Teikyo University
#6	Yutaro Itayama	Outfielder	Asia University

=== Hokkaido Nippon-Ham Fighters ===
Pick	Player name	Position	Team
#1	Kenta Uehara	Pitcher	Meiji University
#2	Takayuki Katoh	Pitcher	Shin Nittetsu Sumikin Kazusa Magic
#3	Kazutomo Iguchi	Pitcher	Tokyo Nogyo University Hokkaido Okhotsk
#4	Shota Hiranuma	Infielder	Tsuruga Kehi High School
#5	Toyoki Tanaka	Pitcher	Nippon Bunri University
#6	Toshitaki Yokoo	Infielder	Keio University
#7	Yuki Yoshida	Pitcher	Tokai University
#8	Yuya Himeno	Outfielder	Osaka Kaisei High School

=== Yomiuri Giants ===
Pick	Player name	Position	Team
#1	Toshiki Sakurai	Pitcher	Ritsumeikan University
#2	Shinnosuke Shigenobu	Outfielder	Waseda University
#3	Hirotaka Yonahara	Pitcher	Futenma High School
#4	Shingo Usami	Catcher	Josai International University
#5	Yasuhiro Yamamoto	Infielder	Keio University
#6	Daisuke Tatsuma	Pitcher	Iwakura High School
#7	Kota Nakagawa	Pitcher	Tokai University
#8	Takuya Matsuzaki	Infielder	Nippon Paper Group
Developmental Player Draft
#1	**Daiki Masuda**	Infielder	Tokushima Indigo Socks
#2	Daisei Kobayashi	Catcher	Musashi Heat Bears
#3	Yusuke Matsuzawa	Outfielder	Kagawa Olive Guyners
#4	Kosei Tajima	Infielder	Musashi Heat Bears
#5	Hideyoshi Ohtake	Pitcher	Musashi Heat Bears
#6	Atsuro Hashimoto	Pitcher	Chinzei High School
#7	Yohei Yajima	Pitcher	Musashi Heat Bears
#8	**Jun Hasegawa**	Pitcher	Ishikawa Million Stars

=== Fukuoka SoftBank Hawks ===
Pick	Player name	Position	Team
#1	Jumpei Takahashi	Pitcher	Gifu Commercial and Business High School
#2	Reiji Kozawa	Pitcher	Nihon University Mishima Senior High School
#3	Kenta Tanigawara	Catcher	Toyohashi Chuo High School
#4	Kenta Chatani	Pitcher	Teikyo Daisan High School
#5	Kenta Kurose	Infielder	Hatsushiba Hashimoto Senior High School
#6	Hikaru Kawase	Infielder	Oita Commercial and Business High School
Developmental Player Draft
#1	Yuto Nozawa	Pitcher	Tsukuba Shuei High School
#2	Ryuya Kodama	Pitcher	Kanagawa University
#3	Yuichi Higoshi	Catcher	Tokyo Nogyo University Hokkaido Okhotsk
#4	Shin Nakamura	Pitcher	Luther High School
#5	Takeshi Watanabe	Pitcher	Iizuka High School

=== Tokyo Yakult Swallows ===
Pick	Player name	Position	Team
#1	Juri Hara	Pitcher	Toyo University
#2	Taishi Hirooka	Infielder	Chiben Gakuen High School
#3	Keiji Takahashi	Pitcher	Ryukoku University Heian High School
#4	Julius Higuma	Pitcher	Kochi Chuo High School
#5	Kotaro Yamasaki	Outfielder	Nihon University
#6	Daiki Watanabe	Infielder	Senshu University Matsudo High School

Preceded by **2014**	**Nippon Professional Baseball draft**	Succeeded by **2016**
