= Takuto =

- Gender: Male

Origin
- Origin: Japanese
- Meaning: Different meanings depending on the kanji used

Takuto (written: 拓人, 拓土, 拓斗, 拓門, 卓人, 巧和, 焚吐, 寛太) is a masculine Japanese given name. Notable people with the name include:

- Takuto (singer) (焚吐; born 1997), Japanese singer and songwriter
- Takuto Haraguchi (原口 拓人; born 1992), Japanese footballer
- Takuto Hashimoto (橋本 拓門; born 1991), Japanese footballer
- Takuto Hayashi (林 卓人; born 1982), Japanese footballer
- Takuto Hirakawa (永川 寛太; born 2003), Japanese footballer
- Takuto Iguchi (井口 卓人; born 1988), Japanese racing driver
- Takuto Inoue (井上 拓斗; born 1995), Japanese badminton player
- Takuto Koyama (小山 拓土; born 1982), Japanese footballer
- Takuto Kurabayashi (倉林 巧和; born 1992), Japanese cyclist
- Takuto Miki (たこみき; born 2003), Japanese footballer
- Takuto Niki (仁木 拓人; born 1987), Japanese tennis player
- Takuto Nogawa (野川 拓斗; born 1991), Japanese former baseball player
- Takuto Otoguro (乙黒 拓斗; born 1998), Japanese sport wrestler
- Takuto Yasuoka (安岡 拓斗; born 1996), Japanese footballer

== Fictional characters ==
- Takuto Maruki (丸喜 拓人), a character in the video game Persona 5 Royal
- Takuto Tsunashi (ツナシ・タクト), the protagonist of the anime series Star Driver: Kagayaki no Takuto
- Takuto (タクト), known in English as Tobias, a recurring character in the anime series Pokémon
