= Kumahara =

Kumahara (熊原, "bear meadow"; also 隈原) is a Japanese surname. The same characters could also be read "Kumabara" or "Kumanohara". People with this surname include:

- Caio Japa, nickname of Caio Takeo Kumahara (born 1983), Brazilian futsal player
- Luca Kumahara (born 1995), Brazilian table tennis player

== See also ==
- Kento Kumabara (熊原 健人, born 1993), Japanese baseball pitcher
