= Akitake =

- Gender: Male

Origin
- Origin: Japanese
- Meaning: Different meanings depending on the kanji used

Akitake (written: 秋武, 昭武 or 明丈) is a masculine Japanese given name. Notable people with the name include:

- Akitake Kōno (河野 秋武; 1911–1978), Japanese actor
- Akitake Okada (岡田 明丈; born 1993), Japanese baseball player
- Tokugawa Akitake (徳川 昭武; 1853–1910), Japanese daimyō
