= Shinsaburō Tawata =

Japanese baseball player (born 1993)

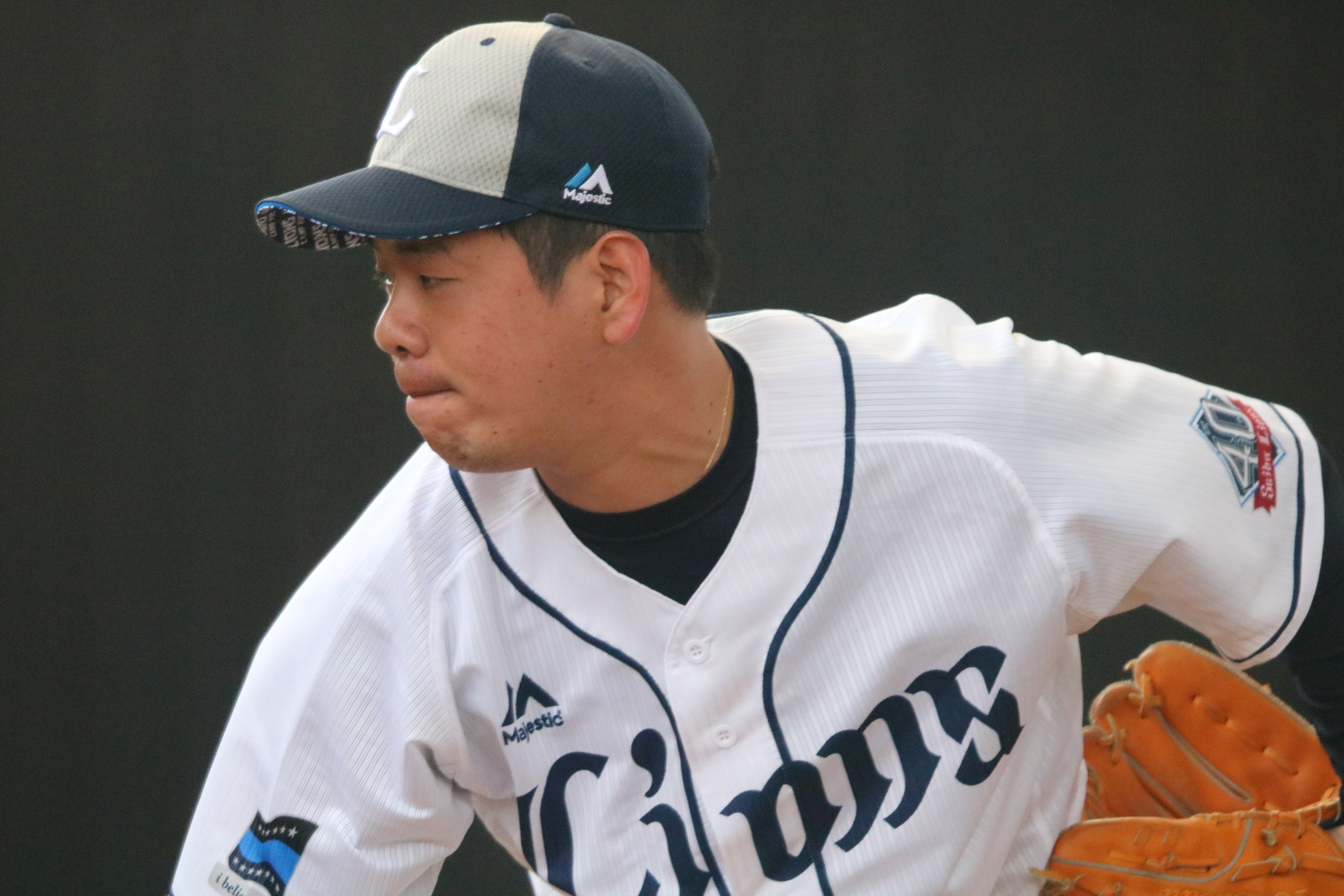

Free agent
- Pitcher
- Born: April 13, 1993 (age 33); Nakagusuku, Okinawa, Japan
- Bats: Right Throws: Right

NPB debut
- May 14, 2016, for the Saitama Seibu Lions

NPB statistics (through 2019 season)
- Win–loss record: 29–21
- Earned run average: 4.17
- Strikeouts: 304
- Stats at Baseball Reference

Teams
- Saitama Seibu Lions (2016–2021)

Shinsaburō Tawata (多和田 真三郎, Tawata Shinsaburō; born April 13, 1993) is a Japanese professional baseball pitcher who is a free agent. He has previously played in Nippon Professional Baseball (NPB) for the Saitama Seibu Lions.

== Career ==
Saitama Seibu Lions selected Tawata with the first selection in the 2015 NPB draft. On May 14, 2016, Tawata made his NPB debut.

On October 10, 2018, Tawata was selected to the Japan national baseball team at the 2018 MLB Japan All-Star Series.

On December 2, 2020, Tawata became a free agent.
