= Jumpei Takahashi =

Japanese baseball player (born 1997)

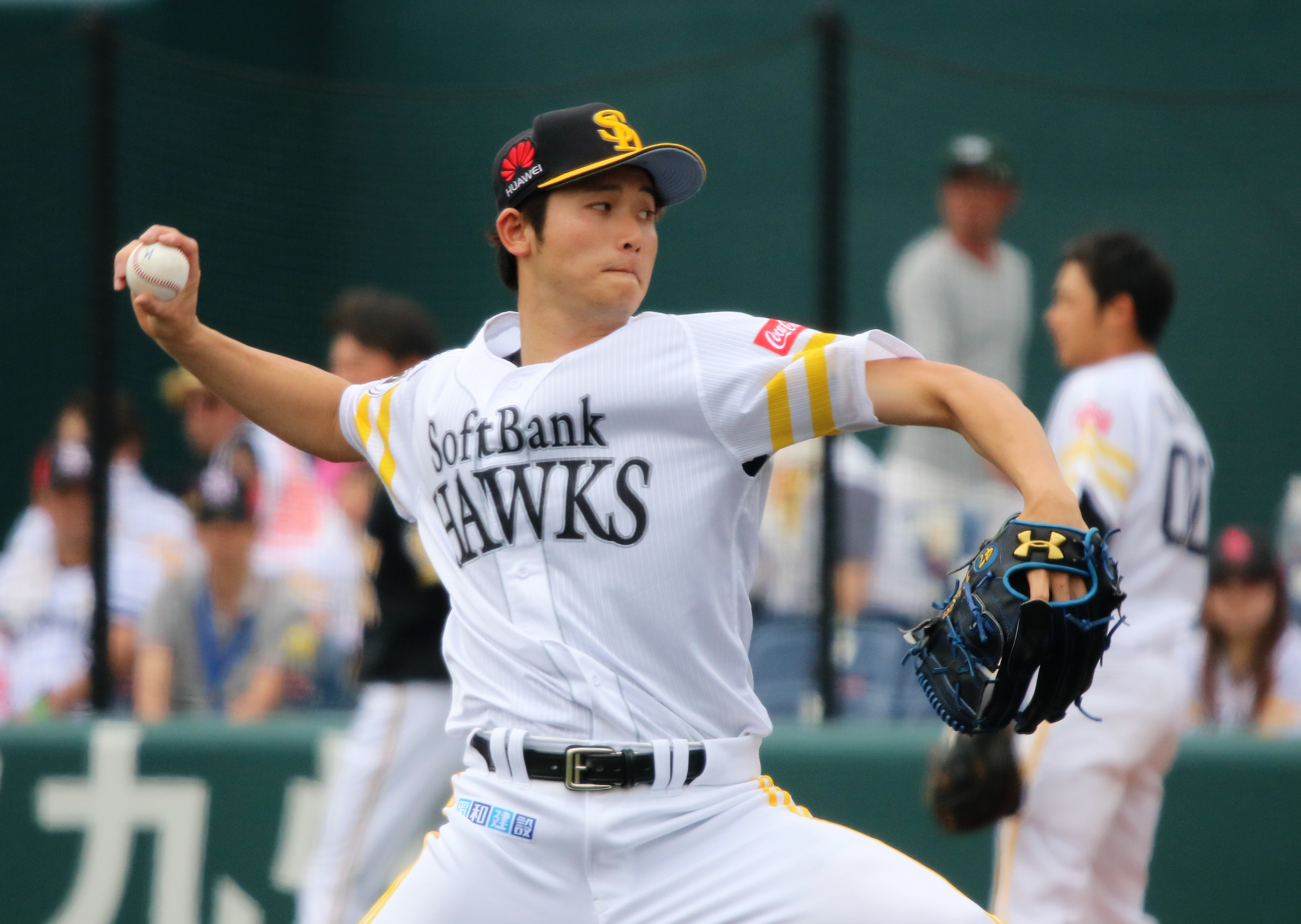
- Takahashi in 2018
- Pitcher
- Born: May 8, 1997 (age 29); Japan
- Batted: Right Threw: Right

NPB debut
- April 14, 2017, for the Fukuoka SoftBank Hawks

Last NPB appearance
- May 3, 2021, for the Fukuoka SoftBank Hawks

NPB statistics
- Win–loss record: 4-3
- Earned run average: 2.63
- Strikeouts: 72
- Stats at Baseball Reference

Teams
- Fukuoka SoftBank Hawks (2016–2023)

Career highlights and awards
- Japan Series champion (2019)
Medals
Men's baseball
Representing Japan
U-18 Baseball World Cup
| Silver medal – second place | 2015 Osaka | Team |

Jumpei Takahashi (高橋 純平, Takahashi Junpei; born May 8, 1997) is a Japanese former professional baseball pitcher. He played in Nippon Professional Baseball (NPB) from 2016 to 2023 for the Fukuoka SoftBank Hawks.

== Early baseball career ==
Takahashi participated in the 3rd grade spring 87th Japanese High School Baseball Invitational Tournament and the 3rd grade summer 97th Japanese High School Baseball Championship as an ace pitcher at Gifu Prefectural Gifu Commercial High School.

He was selected as the Japan national baseball team in the 2015 U-18 Baseball World Cup.

== Professional career ==
=== Fukuoka SoftBank Hawks ===
In the 2015 NPB draft, he was selected as the first pick for the Fukuoka SoftBank Hawks, Chunichi Dragons and Hokkaido Nippon-Ham Fighters where he was won in a lottery by the Hawks.

==== 2016–2020 season ====
On 7 June 2016, Takahashi made his debut for the Hawks Western League team against the Dragons as a relief pitcher claiming the win after pitching 3 scoreless innings and claiming 3 strikeouts. He was selected for the Western League representative team for the 2016 Fresh All-Stars game in Okayama. He was the starting pitcher and threw 1 strikeout and gave up one hit in his single inning.

On April 14, 2017, Takahashi debuted in the Pacific League against the Orix Buffaloes as a relief pitcher. In 2017 season, he pitched only one game in the Pacific League.

In 2018 season, he didn't have a chance to pitch in the Pacific League and pitched in the Western League.

Takahashi finished 2019 season with a record of 3-2 with 42 starts as a Relief pitcher, with a 2.56 ERA, and a 17 Holds and a 58 strikeouts in 51 innings. In the 2019 Japan Series against the Yomiuri Giants, he relief pitched in Game 2.

In 2020 season, Takahashi left the team in March with a pain in his right shoulder. He pitched in the Western League on September 1, but never had a chance to pitch in the Pacific League.

==== 2021-2023 season ====
On April 23, 2021, Takahashi won the match against Chiba Lotte Marines for the first time in two years. He recorded a 1–1 Win–loss record, a 2 holds, and an ERA of 0.00 in 10 pitches, but ended the season with a broken right hand on May 7.

In 2022 season, he didn't have a chance to pitch in the first league, partly because he injured his adductor muscle in spring training and was late to the game.

In 2023 season, he didn't have a chance to pitch in the first league. On October 22, the Hawks announced they would release him.

On December 1, 2023, Takahashi announced that he would retire as an active player. He is also scheduled to be on the team's staff starting next season.
