= Reiji Kozawa =

Japanese baseball player (born 1998)

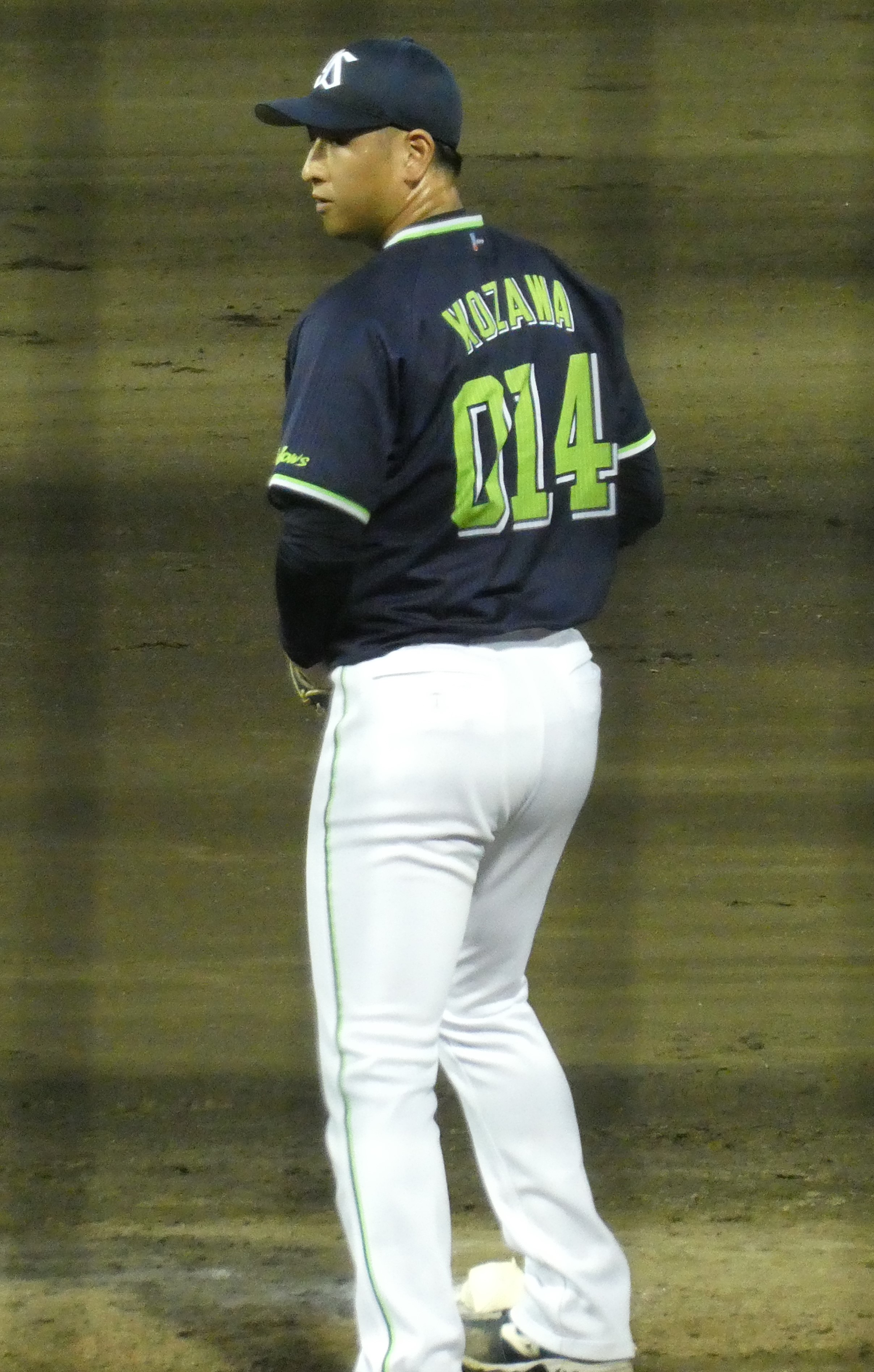

Tokyo Yakult Swallows – No. 45
- Pitcher
- Born: March 9, 1998 (age 28); Mishima, Shizuoka, Japan
- Bats: Left Throws: Right

NPB debut
- August 24, 2017, for the Fukuoka SoftBank Hawks

NPB statistics (through 2024 season)
- Win–loss record: 14-11
- ERA: 3.17
- Holds: 4
- Saves: 11
- Strikeouts: 195
- Stats at Baseball Reference

Teams
- Fukuoka SoftBank Hawks (2016–2020); Tokyo Yakult Swallows (2021–present)

Reiji Kozawa (小澤 怜史, Kozawa Reiji; born March 9, 1998 in Mishima, Shizuoka Prefecture) is a Japanese professional baseball pitcher for the Tokyo Yakult Swallows of Nippon Professional Baseball.

== Professional career ==
On October 22, 2015, Kozawa was drafted by the Fukuoka SoftBank Hawks in the 2015 Nippon Professional Baseball draft. In 2016, Kozawa pitched in informal matches against the Shikoku Island League Plus's teams and amateur baseball teams.

On August 24, 2017, Kozawa debuted in the Pacific League against the Saitama Seibu Lions, and pitched two games in the Pacific League. In June 2018, Kozawa hurt his neck and back and spent the season rehabilitating. On November 20, he left the active roster and signed as a developmental player.

In 2019, Kozawa played in the Western League of NPB's minor leagues, and pitched in eight games and recorded an ERA of .193. In 2020, Kozawa played in the Western League, and pitched in six games and recorded an ERA of .5.51. On November 4, Hawks has released him.

=== Tokyo Yakult Swallows ===
On December 14, 2020, Tokyo Yakult Swallows has signed with him as a developmental player.

June 26, 2022, Kozawa re-signed a 6.5 million yen contract with the Tokyo Yakult Swallows as a registered player under control.
