= Kenta Chatani =

Japanese baseball player (born 1998)

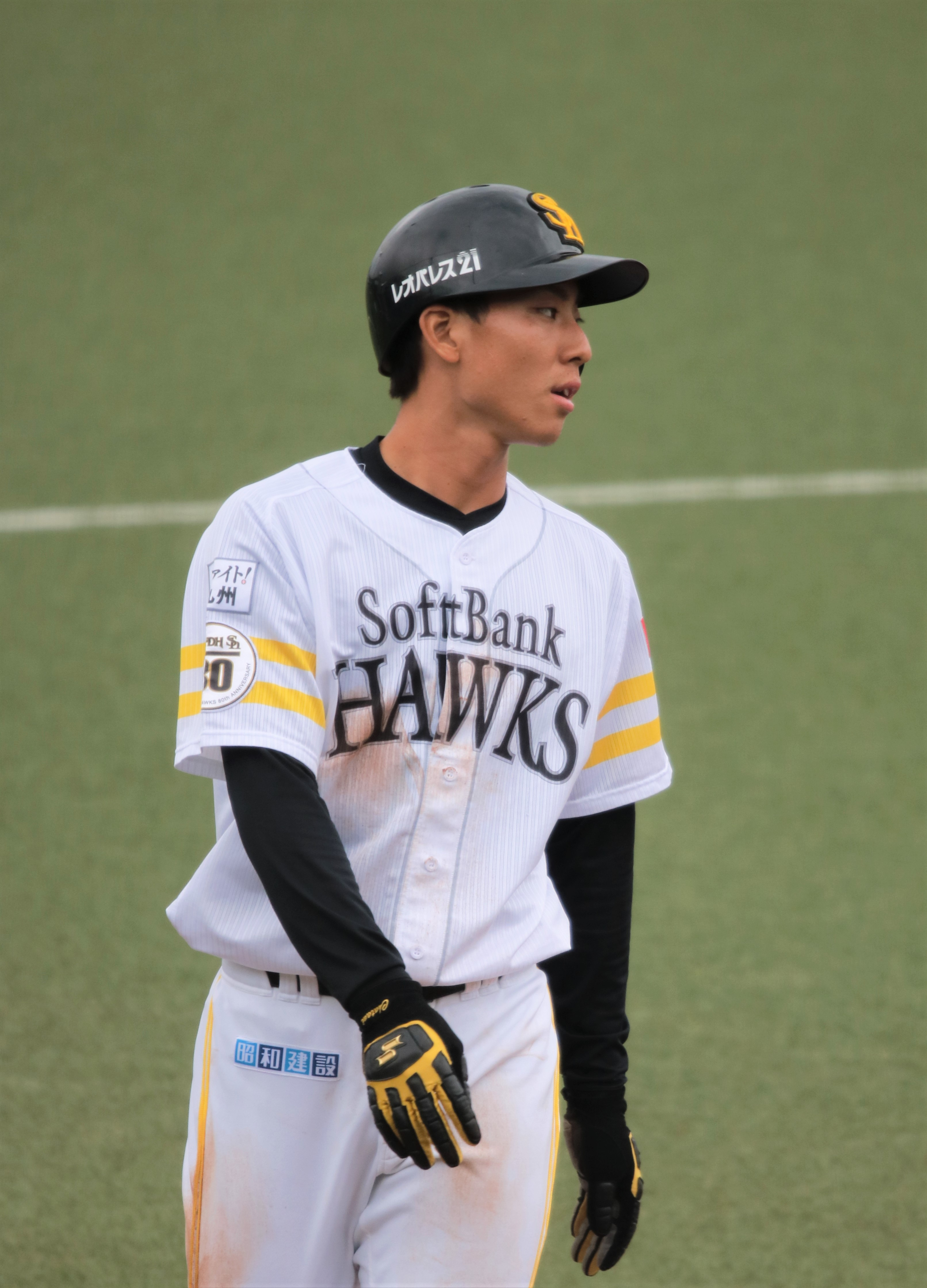
- Chatani with the Fukuoka SoftBank Hawks

Chiba Lotte Marines – No. 67
- Infielders
- Born: January 16, 1998 (age 28); Chigasaki, Kanagawa, Japan
- Bats: Right Throws: Right

NPB debut
- October 8, 2017, for the Fukuoka SoftBank Hawks

NPB statistics (through 2020 season)
- Batting average: .111
- Home runs: 0
- RBI: 0
- Hits: 2
- Stolen base: 1
- Sacrifice bunt: 1

Teams
- Fukuoka SoftBank Hawks (2016-2018); Chiba Lotte Marines (2019-present)

Kenta Chatani (茶谷 健太, Chatani Kenta; born January 16, 1998) is a Japanese professional baseball Infielders for the Chiba Lotte Marines of Nippon Professional Baseball.

== Professional career ==
=== Fukuoka SoftBank Hawks ===
On October 22, 2015, Chatani was drafted by the Fukuoka SoftBank Hawks in the 2015 Nippon Professional Baseball draft.

In 2016 season, he played in the Western League of NPB's minor leagues and played in informal matches against the Shikoku Island League Plus's teams.

On October 8, 2017, Chatani debuted in the Pacific League against the Tohoku Rakuten Golden Eagles, and recorded his first hit.

In 2018 season, he had no chance to play in the Pacific League. Fukuoka SoftBank Hawks offered Chatani a re-contract as a developmental player, but he declined. On November 4, Hawks has released him.

=== Chiba Lotte Marines ===
On January 23, 2019, Chiba Lotte Marines has signed with Chatani as a developmental squad player.

In 2019 season, Chatani played in the Eastern League of NPB's minor leagues. On December 25, he signed a 5 million yen contract with the Chiba Lotte Marines as a registered player under control.

In 2020 season, Chatani finished the regular season in 31 games with a batting average of .063, a one hit, a one stolen base.
