= Shu Yoshida (baseball) =

Japanese baseball player (born 1996)

- Pitcher
- Born: July 8, 1996 (age 29); Shimabara, Nagasaki, Japan
- Bats: Right Throws: Right
- Stats at Baseball Reference

Teams
- Chunichi Dragons (2016–2018)

Shu Yoshida (吉田 嵩, Yoshida Shū; born July 8, 1996 in Shimabara, Nagasaki, Japan) is a Japanese baseball player. He plays pitcher for the Chunichi Dragons on a developmental contract in the Western League.

He was the 2nd pick for the Dragons in the 2015 Development Draft.
