= Hiroto Fuku =

Japanese baseball player (born 1992)

Hiroto Fuku 福 敬登
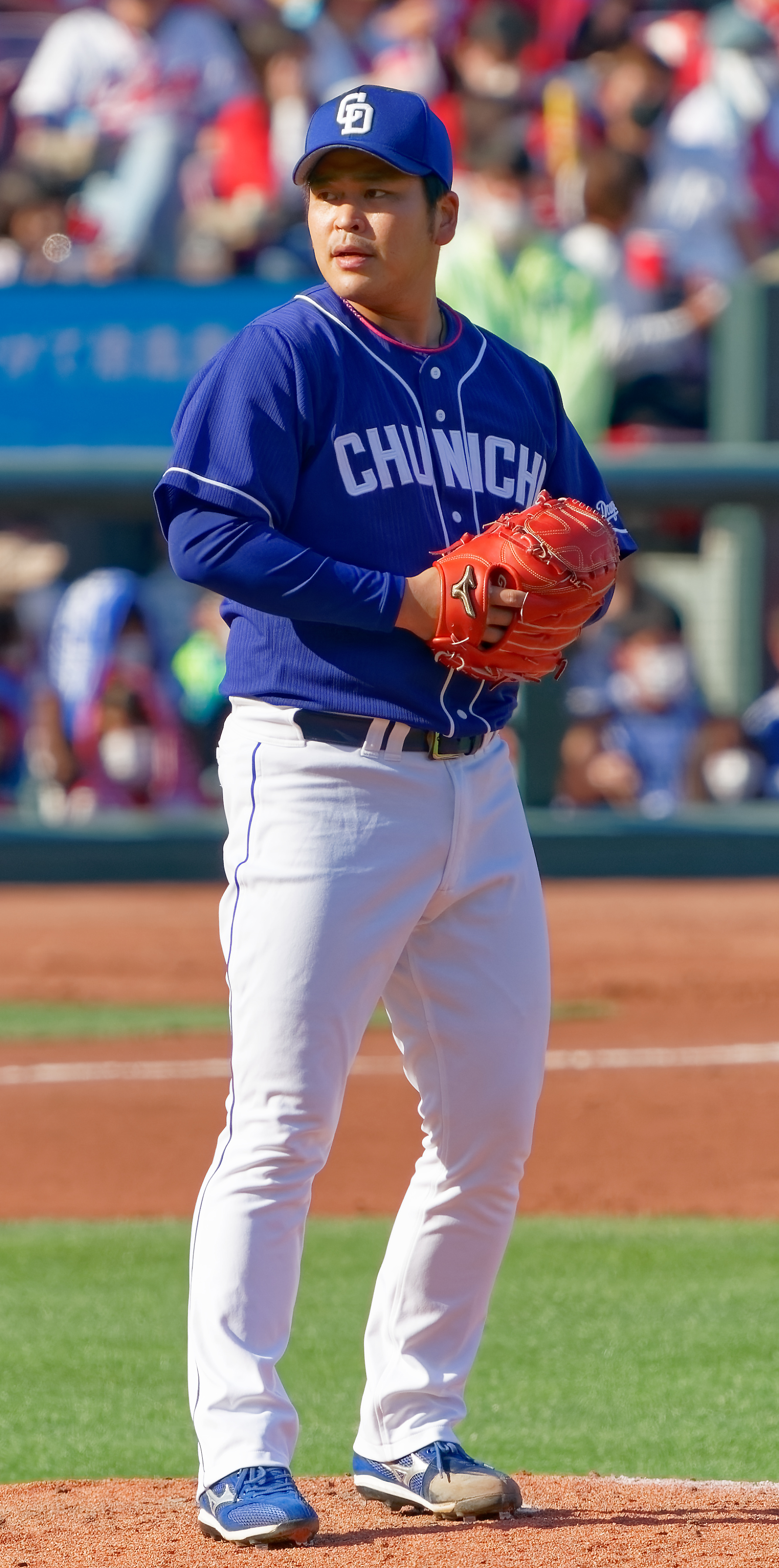

Chunichi Dragons – No. 34
- Pitcher
- Born: June 16, 1992 (age 34); Kobe, Hyōgo, Japan
- Bats: Left Throws: Left

debut
- March 25, 2016, for the Chunichi Dragons

Career statistics (through 2025 season)
- Win-Loss: 13-12
- ERA: 3.25
- Strikeouts: 226
- Saves: 2
- Holds: 86
- Stats at Baseball Reference

Teams
- Chunichi Dragons (2016–present)

Career highlights and awards
- Central League Most Valuable Setup pitcher (2020)

Hiroto Fuku (福 敬登, Fuku Hiroto; born June 16, 1992) is a professional Japanese baseball player. He plays pitcher for the Chunichi Dragons.

Fuku was the fourth draft pick for the Dragons at the 2015 NPB draft.

== Early career ==
Fuku started playing rubber-ball baseball in elementary school. He reached the semi-finals of the Hyogo prefectural high school tournament with his school, Kobe West High School, but was unable to make an appearance at the summer koshien.

He worked for JR Kyushu manning Kokura Station in Fukuoka and playing baseball for the company team where he played at the national baseball championships.

On 22 October 2016, at the 2015 Nippon Professional Baseball draft, Fuku was the fourth pick for the Chunichi Dragons.

At the press conference for the unveiling of the new draftees, it was announced that Fuku would be presented with the number 34 previously worn by the long-serving, 217 win taking pitcher, Masahiro Yamamoto. At the conference, Fuku promised that "the responsibility of carrying on the legacy of a number worn by such a legend as Yamamoto is heavy but I don't think of that as a minus, rather is spurs me on to go out and do it. A professional never uses the word impossible." At the conference, Fuku was asked in a playful way whether he would give an impression of his time working with JR, and he replied with "This is a call for customers riding the express train to Hakata. For those customers taking the number 34 Sonic express please move to the number 4 platform." This playfully mixed in a reference to his new number to the applause and laughter of the crowd.

== Professional career ==
=== Chunichi Dragons ===
==== Rookie Year ====
Fuku was the only rookie in the 2015 draft class to make the opening day roster and he made his professional debut on March 26, 2016, as a relief pitcher in a 7–3 second day loss to the Hanshin Tigers. On 31 March 2016 he made his starting debut against the Hiroshima Carp at Nagoya Dome.

Fuku registered his first win against the Yomiuri Giants at the Tokyo Dome on May 7, 2016, as a reliever following starter Drew Naylor's withdrawal with injury.

On 25 August, he returned to the mound after a long absence from the first team in an extended innings game against the Tokyo Yakult Swallows at Meiji Jingu Stadium where he gave up a walk-off wild pitch in the 11th inning resulting in a 9–8 loss.

==== 2017-2018 ====
At the end of the 2017 season, due to a left shoulder injury, Fuku was demoted to a development contract and assigned the 234 while he was rehabilitating.

On July 19, 2018, after the trade of southpaw reliever, Ryuya Ogawa to the Saitama Seibu Lions, Fuku was reinstated to the full-time roster and reassigned the 34. Fuku made one appearance with the top team to finish the season.

=== 2019 ===
Fuku became a key part of the Dragons bullpen in 2019 pitching in 52 games, 52.2 innings and a 2.05 ERA.
