= Seiya Nakagawa =

Japanese baseball player (born 1993)

- Pitcher
- Born: December 3, 1993 (age 32); Meiwa, Mie, Japan
- Bats: Left Throws: Left

Teams
- Chunichi Dragons (2016)

Seiya Nakagawa (中川 誠也, Nakagawa Seiya; born December 3, 1993 in Meiwa, Mie, Japan) is a Japanese baseball player. He previously played pitcher for the Chunichi Dragons on a developmental contract in the Western League.

He was the 1st pick for the Dragons in the 2015 Development Draft.

On the 28 May 2016, it was announced that Nakagawa had been released by the Dragons.
