= Takuya Mitsuma =

Japanese baseball player (born 1992)

Takuya Mitsuma 三ツ間卓也
- Pitcher
- Born: July 22, 1992 (age 33); Takasaki, Gunma, Japan
- Bats: Right Throws: Right

debut
- 31 March, 2017, for the Chunichi Dragons

NPB statistics (through 2020)
- Win–loss record: 4–3
- ERA: 5.14
- Strikeouts: 72
- Stats at Baseball Reference

Teams
- Musashino Heat Bears (2015); Chunichi Dragons (2016–2021)

Takuya Mitsuma (三ツ間卓也, Mitsuma Takuya; born July 22, 1992 in Takasaki, Gunma, Japan) is a Japanese baseball player. He plays pitcher. He is currently a free agent having previously played for the Chunichi Dragons.

Mitsuma is a descendant of Heian period poet, scholar and politician, Sugawara no Michizane through his mother.

== Early career ==
He was the 3rd pick for the Dragons in the 2015 Development Draft. On 12 November 2015, he signed a development player contract with a ¥2,000,000 moving allowance and a ¥3,000,000 yearly salary.

== Professional career ==
On 25 November 2016, due to positive performances in the Dragons farm team including being the teams' first day starter in the yearly Phoenix League, Mitsuma was awarded with a ¥4,400,000 full time contract being added to the first team roster.
