= Taishi Hirooka =

Japanese baseball player (born 1997)

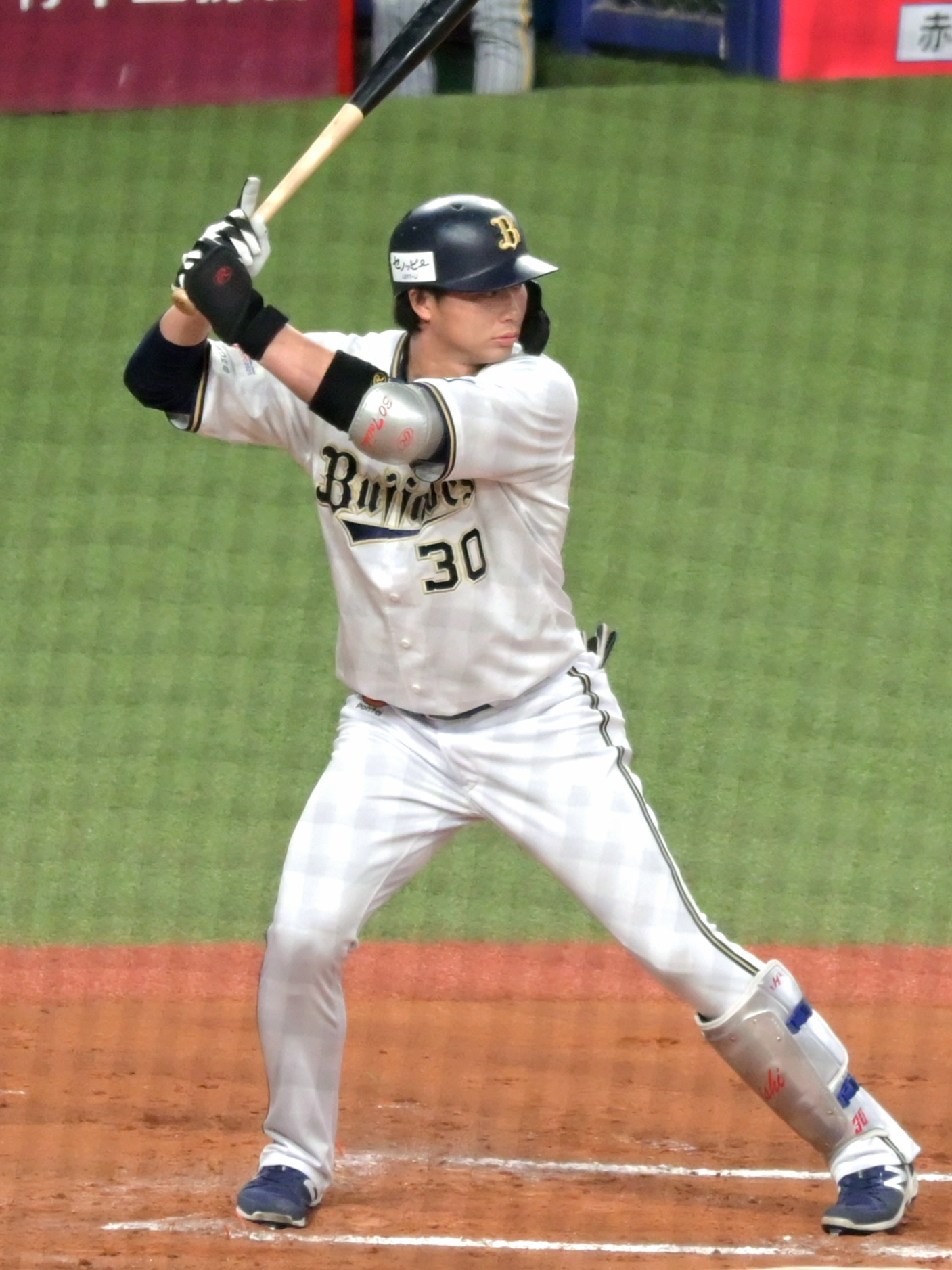
- Hirooka with the Orix Buffaloes

Orix Buffaloes – No. 30
- Infielder/Outfielder
- Born: April 9, 1997 (age 29); Abeno-ku, Osaka, Japan
- Bats: Right Throws: Right

NPB debut
- September 29, 2016, for the Tokyo Yakult Swallows

Career statistics (through 2025 season)
- Batting average: .220
- Hits: 277
- Home runs: 35
- Runs batted in: 123
- Stolen bases: 19
- Stats at Baseball Reference

Teams
- Tokyo Yakult Swallows (2016–2020); Yomiuri Giants (2021–2023); Orix Buffaloes (2023–present)
Medals
Men's baseball
Representing Japan
U-23 Baseball World Cup
Gold medal – first place	2016, Monterrey, Mexico	Team

Taishi Hirooka (廣岡 大志, Hirooka Taishi; born April 9, 1997) is a Japanese professional baseball infielder for the Orix Buffaloes of Nippon Professional Baseball (NPB). He has previously played in NPB for the Tokyo Yakult Swallows and Yomiuri Giants.

== Professional career ==
=== Tokyo Yakult Swallows ===
On October 22, 2015, Hirooka was drafted by the Tokyo Yakult Swallows in the 2015 Nippon Professional Baseball draft.

On September 29, 2016, Hirooka debuted in the Central League against the Yokohama DeNA BayStars, and recorded his first Home run.

In 2016 - 2020 season, he recorded in 236 games with a batting average of .214, a 21 home runs, a RBI of 54.

=== Yomiuri Giants ===
On March 1, 2021, Hirooka was traded to the Yomiuri Giants. Hirooka played in 78 games for Yomiuri, hitting .189/.256/.387 with 5 home runs and 15 RBI. In 2022, Hirooka played in only 28 games for the Giants, struggling to a .180/.293/.280 slash line with no home runs and 4 RBI.

=== Orix Buffaloes ===
On May 17, 2023, Hirooka was traded to the Orix Buffaloes in exchange for Kohei Suzuki (K–Suzuki).
