= Masaru Watanabe =

Japanese baseball player (born 1993)

Masaru Watanabe 渡辺勝
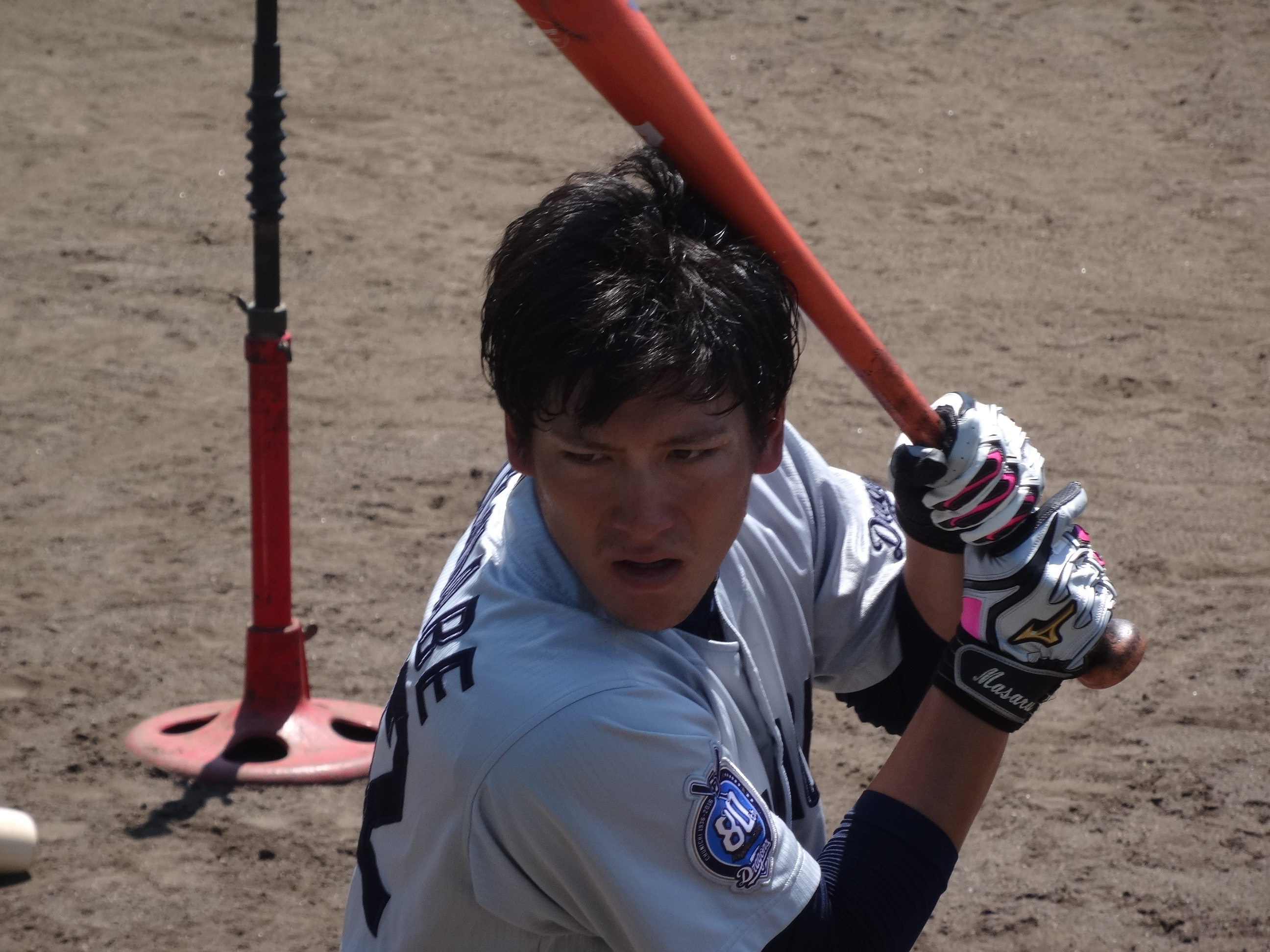
- Outfielder
- Born: October 14, 1993 (age 32); Kōnan-ku, Yokohama, Kanagawa, Japan
- Bats: Left Throws: Right

NPB debut
- 29 March 2019, for the Chunichi Dragons

NPB statistics (through 2020 season)
- Batting average: .167
- Hits: 7
- Homeruns: 0
- RBIs: 2

Teams
- Chunichi Dragons (2016–2022)

Masaru Watanabe (渡辺 勝, Watanabe Masaru; born October 14, 1993 in Kōnan-ku, Yokohama, Kanagawa), Japan is a professional Japanese baseball outfielder. He last played for the Chunichi Dragons.

On 22 October 2015, Watanabe was selected as the 6th draft pick for the Chunichi Dragons at the development player round of the 2015 NPB Draft and on 27 November signed a development player contract with a ¥2,000,000 moving allowance and a ¥3,000,000 yearly salary.

After performing well for the farm team over 3 seasons, Watanabe was upgraded to a fully rostered contract at the end of the 2018 NPB season being presented with the number 31.
