= Yū Satō =

Japanese baseball player (born 1993)

Yū Satō 佐藤優
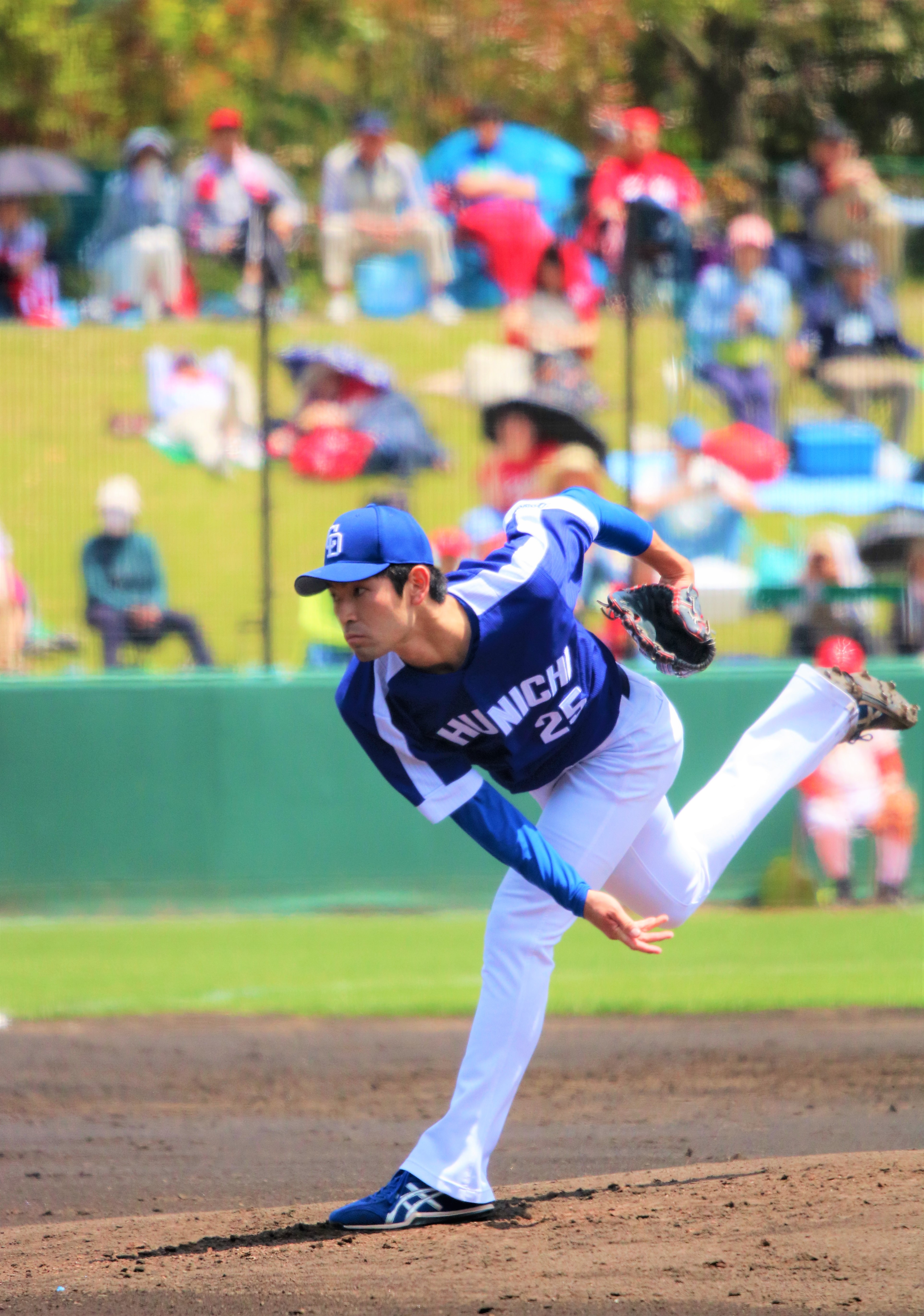
- Pitcher
- Born: June 29, 1993 (age 32); Ōsaki, Miyagi, Japan
- Bats: Left Throws: Right

debut
- 10 May, 2016, for the Chunichi Dragons

NPB statistics (through 2020 season)
- Win–loss record: 5-2
- Innings Pitched: 110
- ERA: 4.34
- Strikeouts: 95
- Stats at Baseball Reference

Teams
- Chunichi Dragons (2016–2022)

Yū Satō (佐藤 優, Satō Yū; born June 28, 1993 in Ōsaki, Miyagi, Japan) is a professional Japanese baseball player. He previously played pitcher for the Chunichi Dragons.

== Early career ==
Satō started playing rubber-ball baseball in elementary school. With his high school, Furukawagakuen, he started his freshman year on the bench and reached the best 8 of the Tohoku Regional high school tournament.

He attended Tohoku Fukushi University and started playing league games in his freshman year. In his senior year in a game against Tohoku Institute of Technology, Satō fanned a remarkable 13 batters. He finished with an 11–2 win–loss record with a 1.29 ERA.

On 22 October 2016, Satō was selected as second pick for the Chunichi Dragons at the 2015 Nippon Professional Baseball draft and on 1 December signed a \10,000,000 per year contract with a \70,000,000 sign-on bonus.

== Professional career ==
=== 2016-2017 ===
On 10 May, in a game against the Yokohama DeNA Baystars at Yokohama Stadium, he claimed a debut win throwing 5 innings for 1 earned run becoming the first Dragons rookie pitcher to win on debut since Kenshin Kawakami in 1998.

Satō finished the 2016 NPB season having started 4 games going 1–0 in decisions with a 3.67 ERA. The following season, Satō was limited to mostly work out of the bullpen claiming 2 wins, 2 holds and a 5.40 ERA.

=== 2018-Present ===
Satō made his first appearance in April, but was immediately demoted to the farm team after surrendering 3 runs. He would later join the team in June and record 11 consecutive games without an earned run. For the end of the season, thanks to the mishaps of Shinji Tajima and Hiroshi Suzuki, Satō was made the closer and on 24 August registered his first career save. Satō would end the season having pitched in 42 games with a 1–2 record, 5 saves, 10 holds and a 2.08 ERA.

Despite breaking out somewhat in 2018, Satō was unable to repeat his success in 2019 making a career lowest 7 mound appearances despite being with the team from opening day. On the farm, Satō would pitch in 24 games, throwing 39 innings for a respectable 3.00 ERA. In the off-season, on October 21, Satō underwent arthroplastic surgery on his right elbow.

== International career ==
On October 26, 2018, he was selected Japan national baseball team at the 2018 MLB Japan All-Star Series.

== Pitching style ==
Satō throws a four-seam fastball that tops out at 151 km/h. He can also throw a forkball that was taught to him by former Seattle Mariners pitcher, Kazuhiro Sasaki.
