= Kotaro Yamasaki =

Japanese baseball player (born 1993)

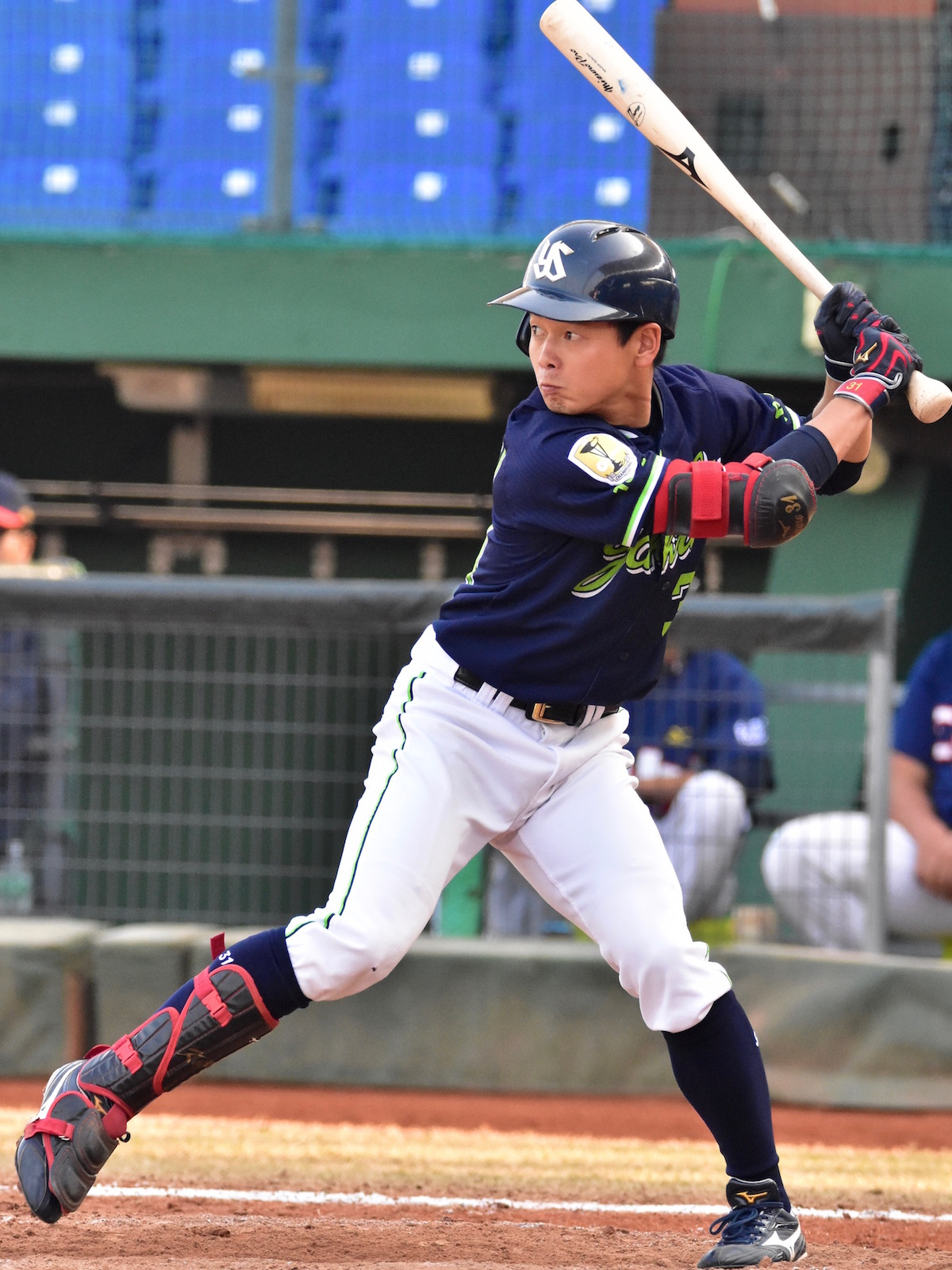

Tokyo Yakult Swallows – No. 77
- Outfielder/Coach
- Born: August 11, 1993 (age 32); Kinokawa, Wakayama, Japan
- Batted: Left Threw: Left

NPB debut
- July 31, 2016, for the Tokyo Yakult Swallows

Last NPB appearance
- October 3, 2024, for the Tokyo Yakult Swallows

Career statistics
- Batting average: .246
- Hits: 356
- Home runs: 7
- RBI: 97
- Stolen bases: 48
- Stats at Baseball Reference

Teams
- As player: Tokyo Yakult Swallows (2016–2024); As coach: Tokyo Yakult Swallows (2025–present)

Career highlights and awards
- 1× Japan Series champion (2021)

Kotaro Yamasaki (山崎 晃大朗, Yamasaki Kotaro; born August 11, 1993) is a Japanese former professional baseball outfielder. He played in Nippon Professional Baseball (NPB) for the Tokyo Yakult Swallows.

== Career ==
Yamasaki played in Nippon Professional Baseball for 9 seasons, slashing .246/.306/.310 with 7 home runs, 97 RBI, and 48 stolen bases. On September 25, 2024, Yamasaki announced that he would be retiring following the conclusion of the season.
