= Yutaro Itayama =

Japanese baseball player (born 1994)

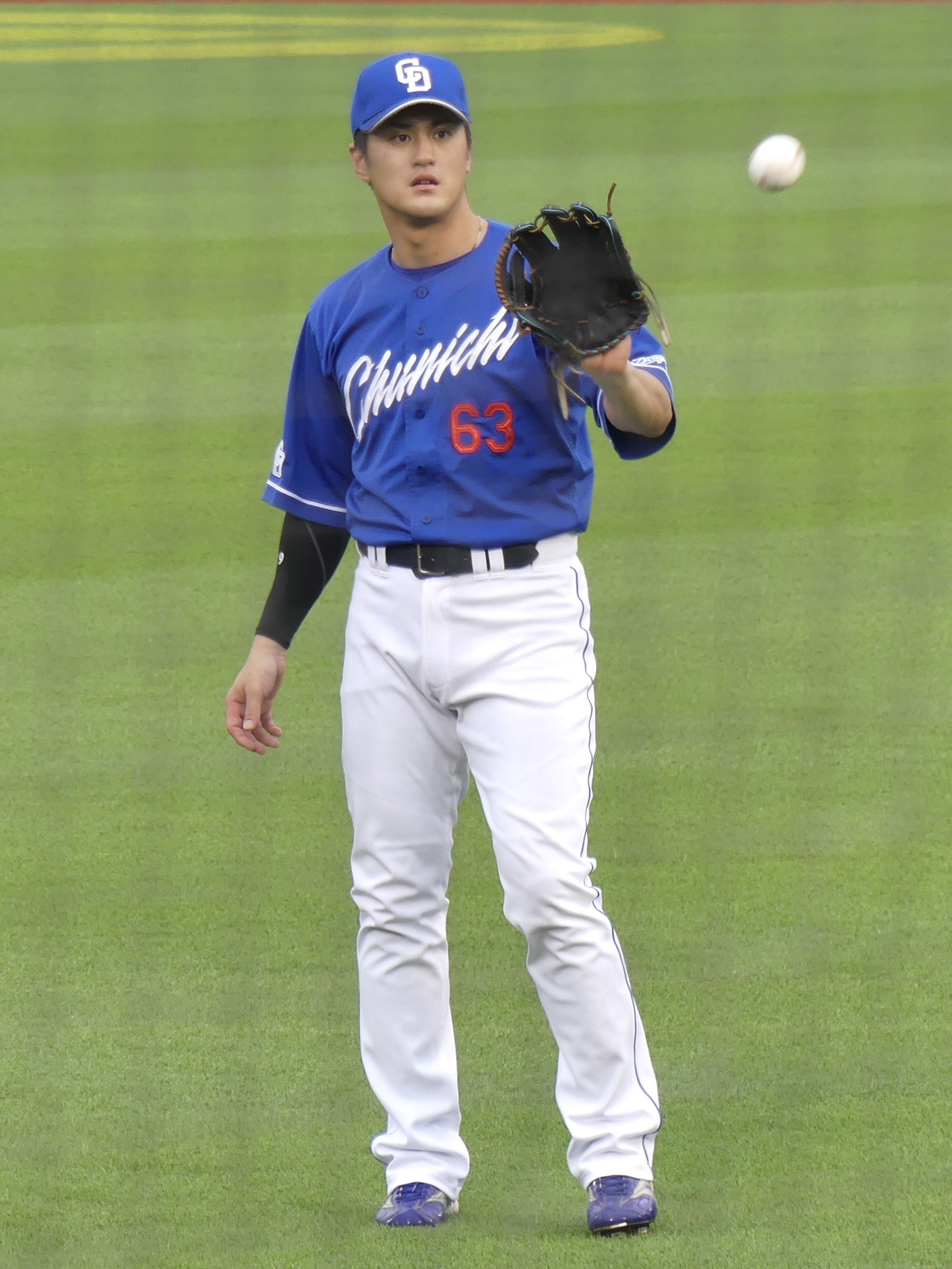

Chunichi Dragons – No. 63
- Outfielder/Infielder
- Born: March 27, 1994 (age 32); Yokohama, Kanagawa, Japan
- Bats: Left Throws: Right

debut
- April 22, 2018, for the Hanshin Tigers

Career statistics (through July 26, 2026)
- Batting average: .223
- Home runs: 12
- Runs batted in: 55
- Stats at Baseball Reference

Teams
- Hanshin Tigers (2016–2023); Chunichi Dragons (2024–Present)

Yutaro Itayama (板山 祐太郎, Itayama Yutaro; born March 27, 1994 in Yokohama, Kanagawa, Japan) is a professional Japanese baseball player. He plays outfielder or infielder for the Chunichi Dragons.
