= Daichi Takeyasu =

Japanese baseball player

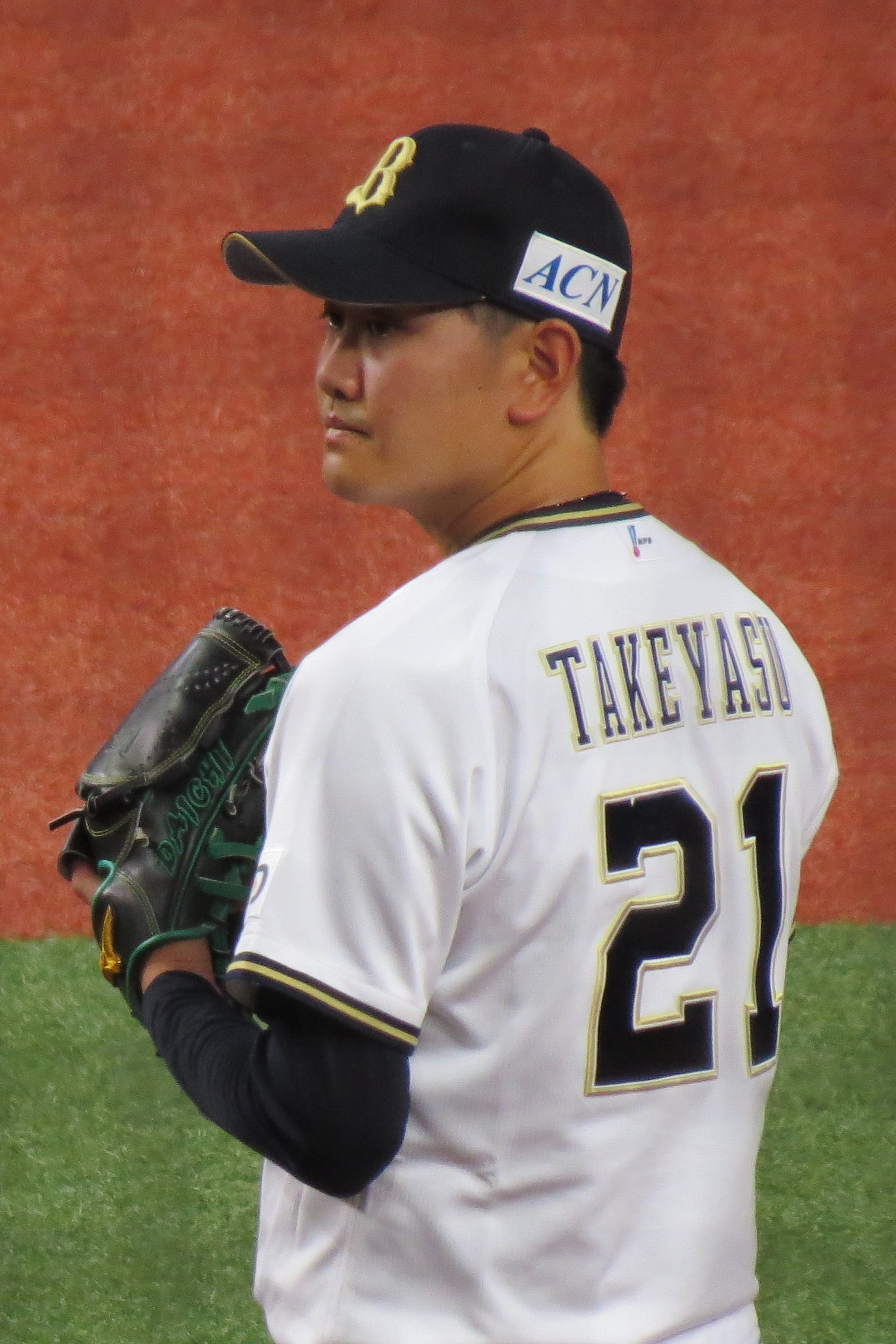
- Pitcher
- Born: September 27, 1994 (age 31); Itō, Shizuoka, Japan
- Bats: Right Throws: Right

NPB debut
- October 5, 2017, for the Hanshin Tigers

Career statistics (through 2022 season)
- Win–loss record: 10-4
- Earned Run Average: 4.11
- Strikeouts: 89
- Saves: 0
- Holds: 0
- Stats at Baseball Reference

Teams
- Hanshin Tigers (2016–2018); Orix Buffaloes (2019–2023)

Career highlights and awards
- Japan Series champion (2022)

Daichi Takeyasu (竹安 大知, Takeyasu Daichi; born September 27, 1994) is a professional Japanese baseball player. He plays pitcher for the Orix Buffaloes.
