= Taisuke Kondoh =

Japanese baseball player (born 1991)

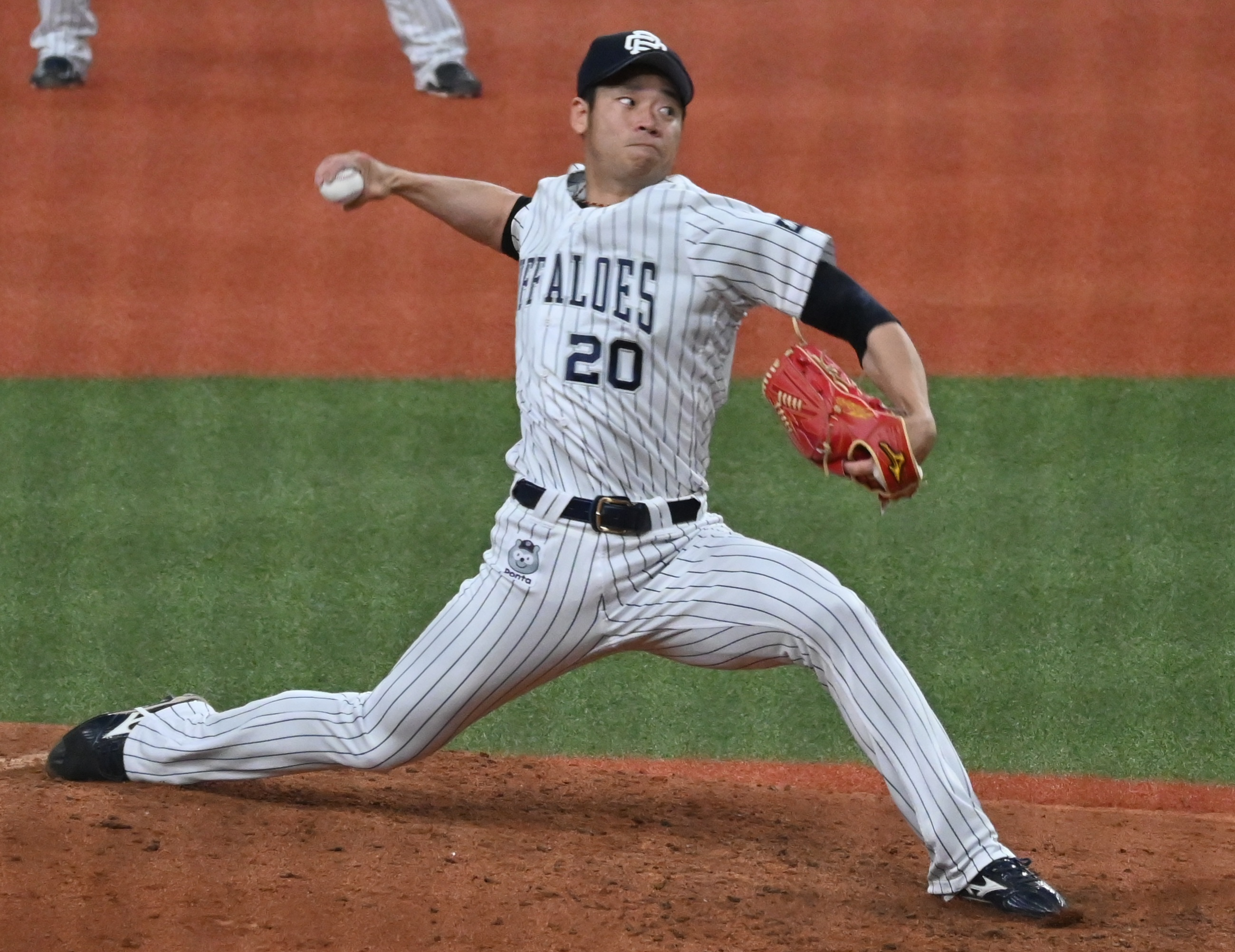
- Pitcher
- Born: May 29, 1991 (age 34); Sakai, Osaka, Japan
- Batted: Right Threw: Right

NPB debut
- March 26, 2016, for the Orix Buffaloes

Last NPB appearance
- October 1, 2023, for the Orix Buffaloes

Career statistics
- Win–loss record: 9-15
- Earned Run Average: 3.17
- Strikeouts: 229
- Saves: 4
- Holds: 71
- Stats at Baseball Reference

Teams
- Orix Buffaloes (2016–2023); Yomiuri Giants (2024–2025)

Career highlights and awards
- 1× Japan Series champion (2022)

Taisuke Kondoh (近藤 大亮, Kondoh Taisuke; born May 29, 1991 in Sakai, Osaka, Japan) is a professional Japanese baseball player. He plays pitcher for the Yomiuri Giants.
