= Hiroki Yokoyama (baseball) =

Japanese baseball player

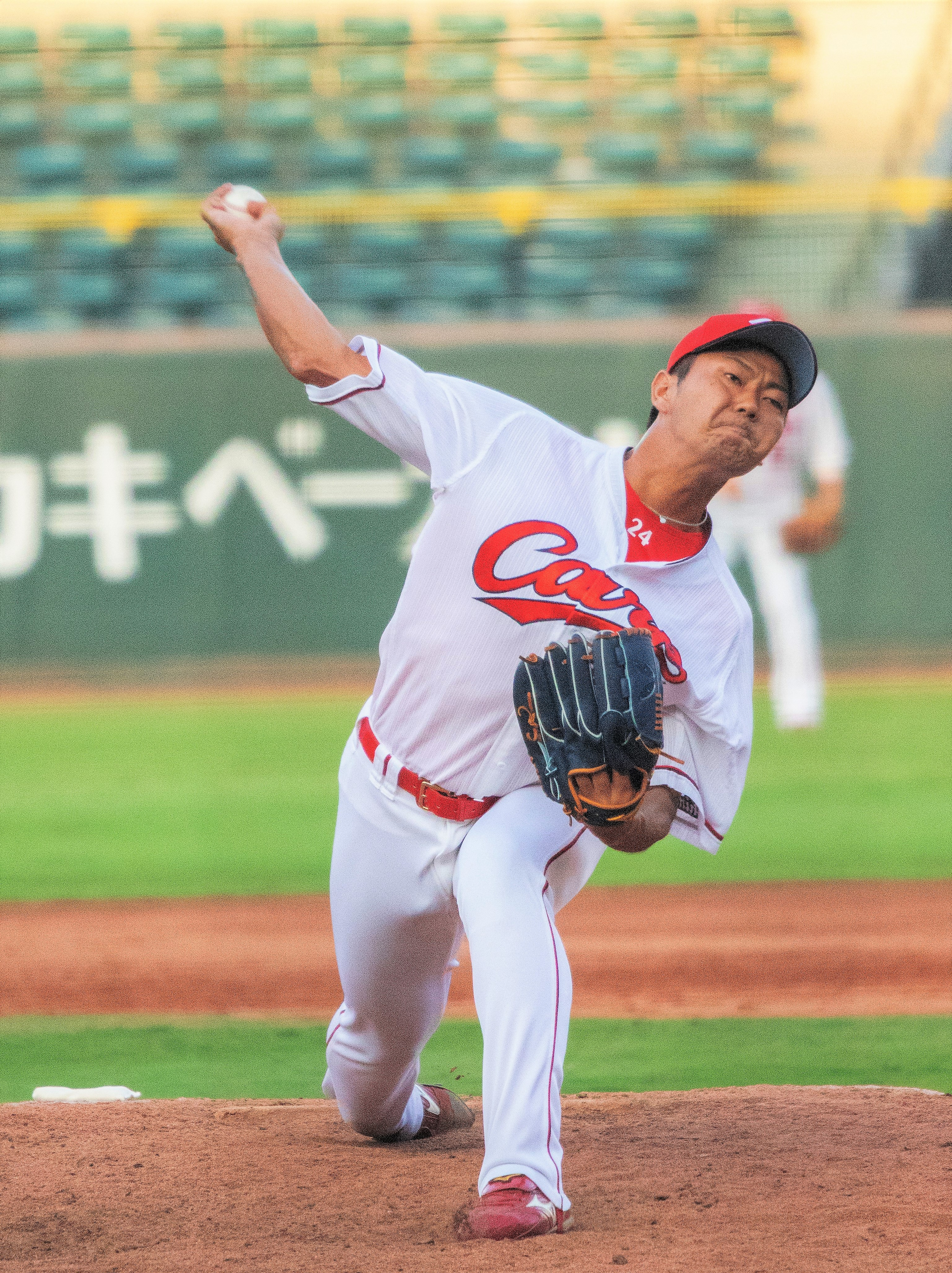
- Pitcher
- Born: March 12, 1992 (age 34); Miyazaki, Miyazaki, Japan
- Bats: Left Throws: Right

debut
- March 30, 2016, for the Hiroshima Toyo Carp

NPB statistics (through 2016 season)
- Win–loss record: 2–2
- ERA: 5.47
- Strikeouts: 17
- Stats at Baseball Reference

Teams
- Hiroshima Toyo Carp (2016–2019)

Hiroki Yokoyama (横山 弘樹, Yokoyama Hiroki; born March 12, 1992) is a professional Japanese baseball player. He plays pitcher for the Hiroshima Toyo Carp.
