= Kakeru Ayabe =

Japanese baseball player (born 1997)

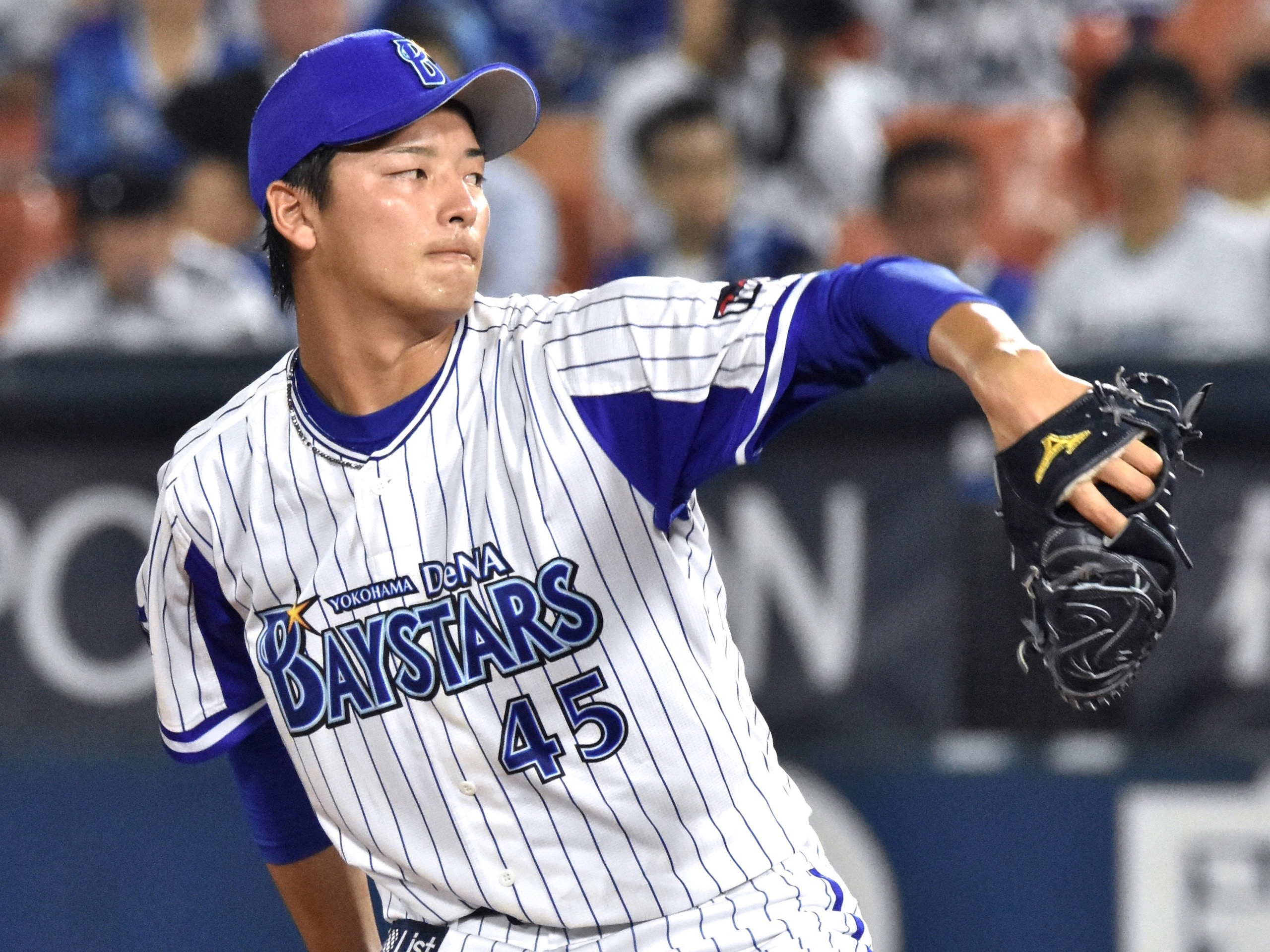
- Ayabe with the Yokohama DeNA BayStars
- Pitcher
- Born: April 25, 1997 (age 28); Toride, Ibaraki, Japan
- Bats: Right Throws: Right

debut
- October 3, 2017, for the Yokohama DeNA BayStars

Career statistics (through 2019 season)
- Win–loss record: 1–0
- Earned run average: 0.00
- Strikeouts: 5
- Stats at Baseball Reference

Teams
- Yokohama DeNA BayStars (2017–2019)

Kakeru Ayabe (綾部 翔, Ayabe Kakeru; born April 25, 1997) is a professional Japanese baseball player. He plays pitcher for the Yokohama DeNA BayStars.
