= Aito Takeda =

Japanese baseball player (born 1997)

Aito (Aito Takeda)
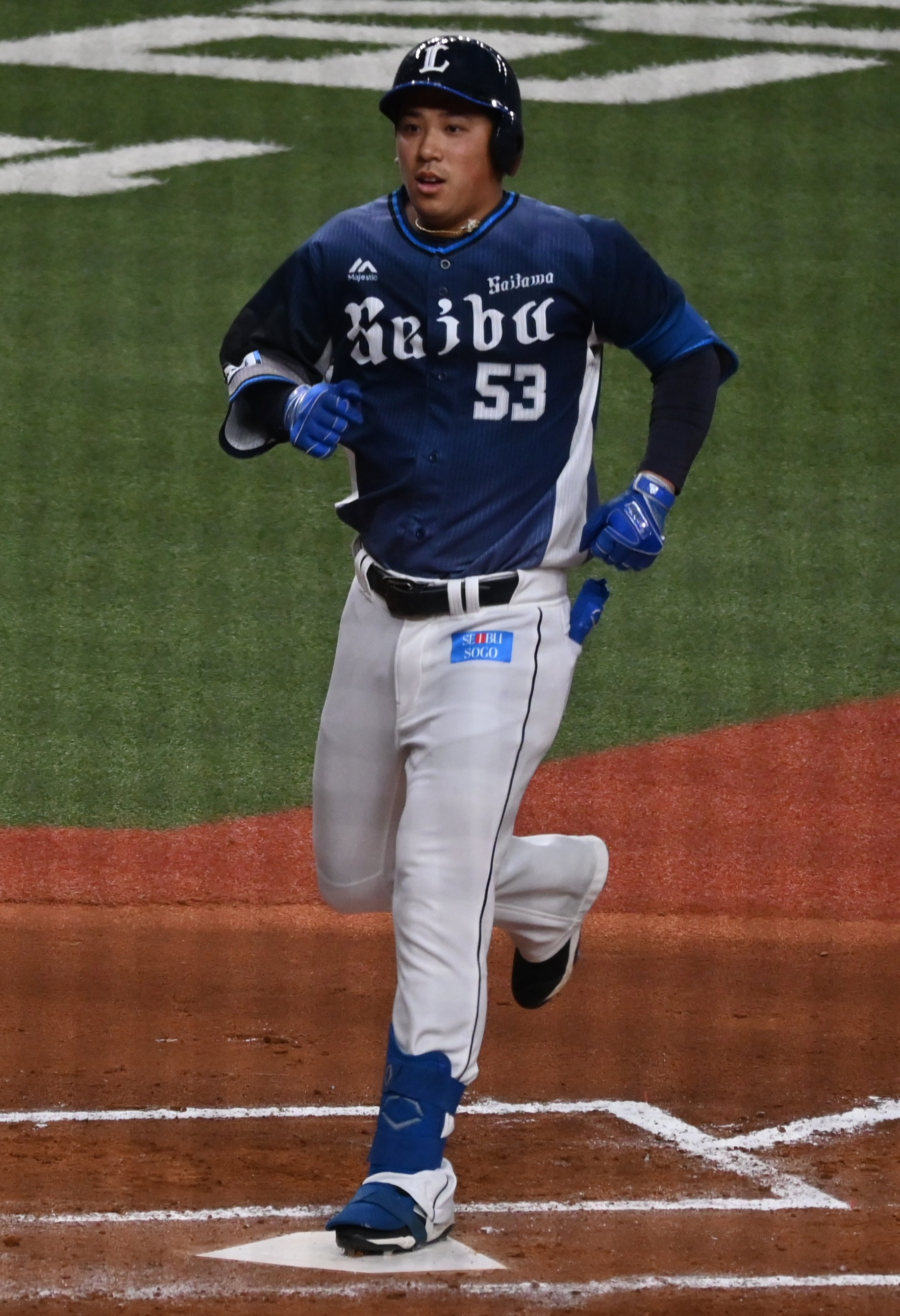

Chiba Lotte Marines – No. 50
- Outfielder
- Born: April 6, 1997 (age 29); Sakai, Osaka, Japan
- Bats: Left Throws: Right

NPB debut
- June 6, 2017, for the Saitama Seibu Lions

NPB statistics (through 2022 season)
- Batting average: .223
- Hits: 163
- Home runs: 17
- Runs batted in: 73
- Stolen base: 10
- Stats at Baseball Reference

Teams
- Saitama Seibu Lions (2016–2023); Chiba Lotte Marines (2024–2026)

Aito Takeda (武田 愛斗, Takeda Aito; born April 6, 1997) also known as Aito (愛斗) is a professional Japanese baseball player for the Chiba Lotte Marines. He played outfield for the Saitama Seibu Lions from 2017 to 2023. He was selected by the Chiba Lotte Marines in the 2023 Active Player Draft.
