= Kento Kumabara =

Japanese baseball player (born 1993)

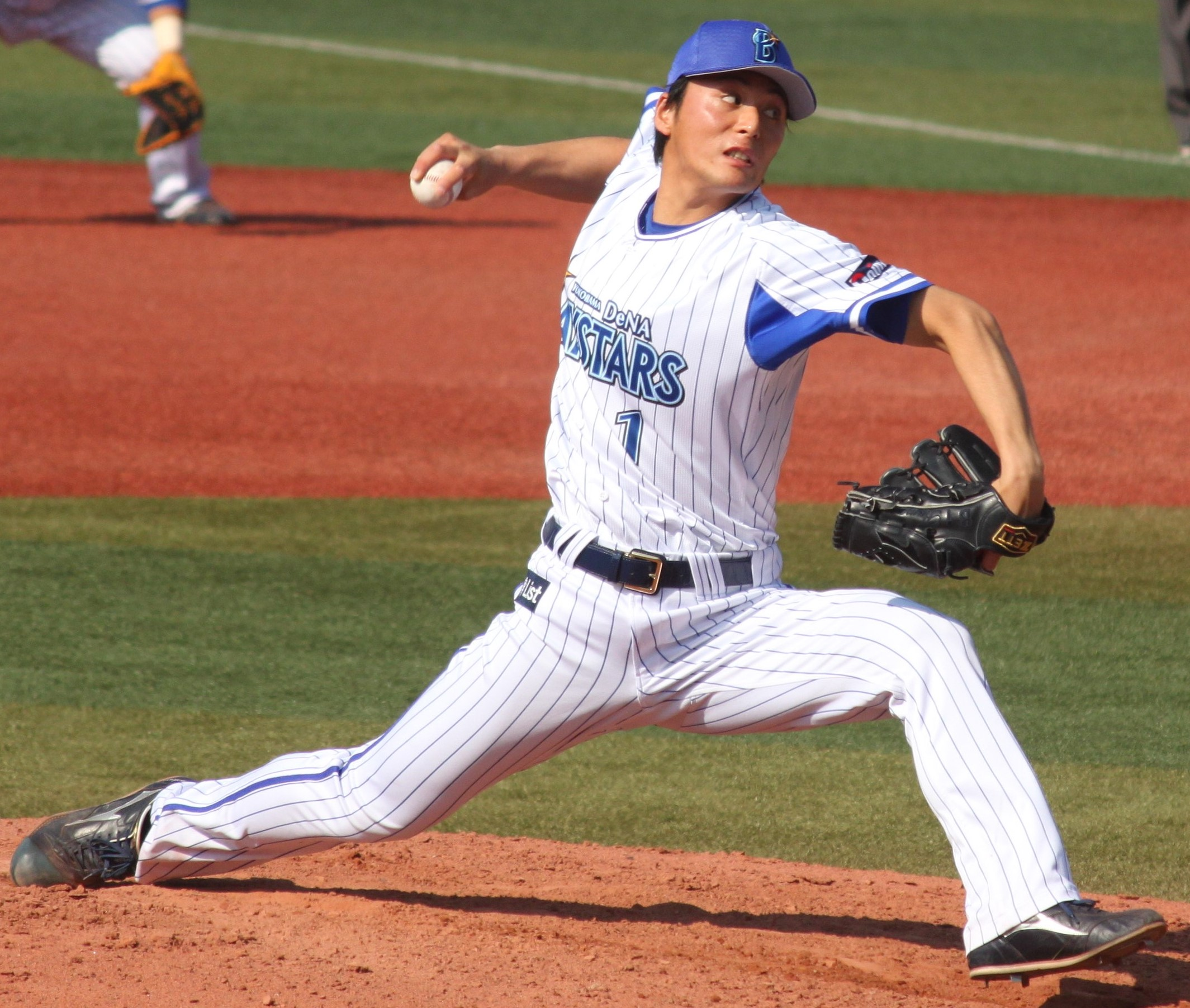
- Kumabara with the Yokohama DeNA BayStars
- Pitcher
- Born: October 19, 1993 (age 32); Kakuda, Miyagi, Japan
- Batted: Left Threw: Right

NPB debut
- May 3, 2016, for the Yokohama DeNA BayStars

Last NPB appearance
- June 12, 2019, for the Tohoku Rakuten Golden Eagles

NPB statistics
- Win–loss record: 4–2
- Earned run average: 5.16
- Strikeouts: 45
- Stats at Baseball Reference

Teams
- Yokohama DeNA BayStars (2016-2017); Tohoku Rakuten Golden Eagles (2019–2020)

Kento Kumabara (熊原 健人, Kumabara Kento; born October 19, 1993) is a Japanese former professional baseball pitcher. He played in Nippon Professional Baseball (NPB) for the Yokohama DeNA BayStars and Tohoku Rakuten Golden Eagles from 2016 to 2020.

== Career ==
Yokohama DeNA BayStars selected Kumabara with the second selection in the 2015 NPB draft.

On May 12, 2019, Kumabara made his NPB debut. On December 2, 2020, Kumabara became a free agent; shortly thereafter, he announced his retirement.
