= Kenta Uehara =

Japanese baseball player (born 1994)

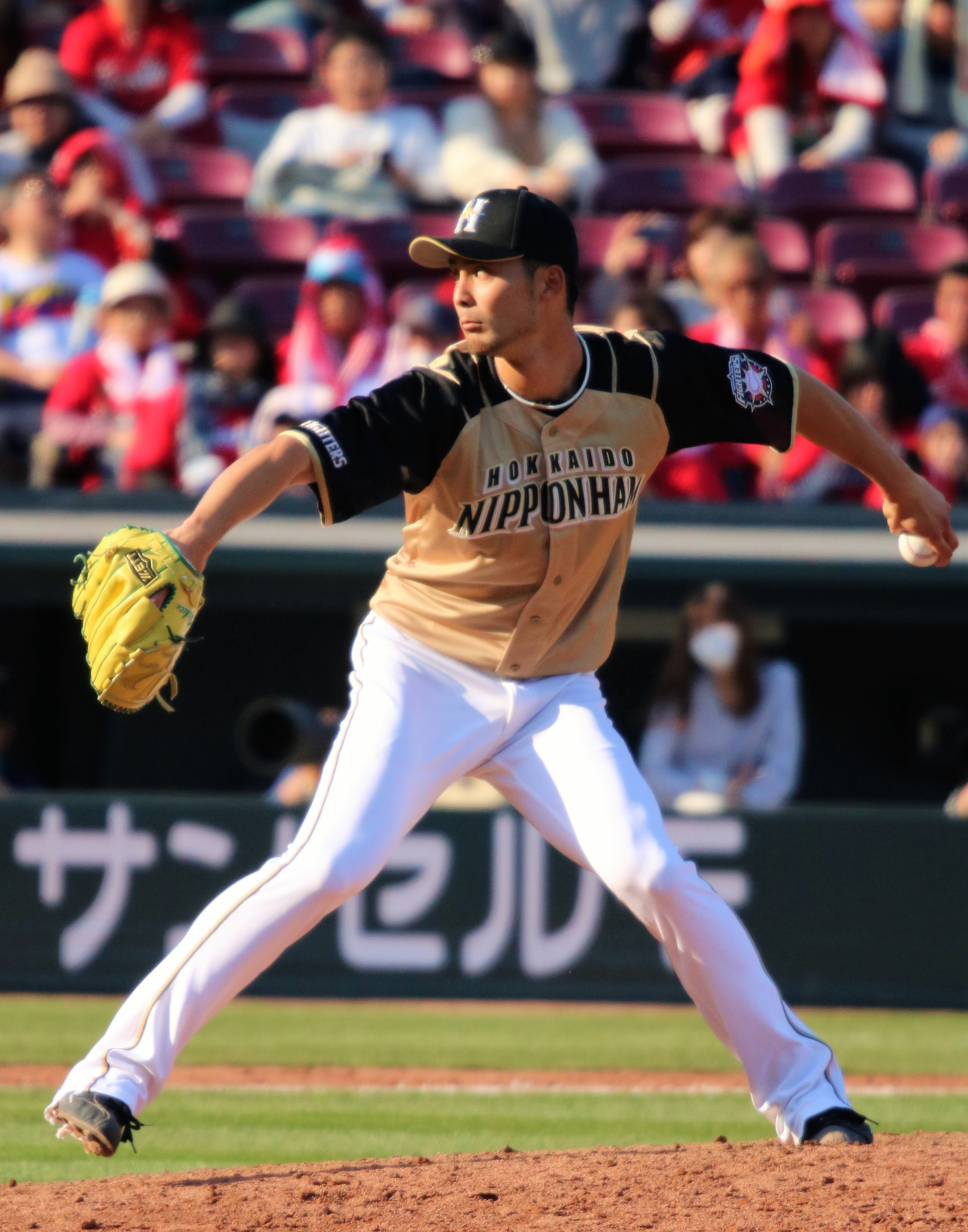

Hokkaido Nippon Ham Fighters – No. 20
- Pitcher, Outfielder
- Born: March 29, 1994 (age 32); Uruma, Okinawa, Japan
- Bats: Left Throws: Left

debut
- September 30, 2016, for the Hokkaido Nippon-Ham Fighters

NPB statistics (through 2022)
- Win-loss record: 10-16
- ERA: 4.28
- Strikeouts: 182
- Stats at Baseball Reference

Teams
- Hokkaido Nippon-Ham Fighters (2016–present)

Kenta Uehara (上原 健太, Uehara Kenta; born March 29, 1994) is a professional Japanese baseball player. He plays pitcher for the Hokkaido Nippon-Ham Fighters.
