= Keishō Amiya =

Japanese baseball player (born 1997)

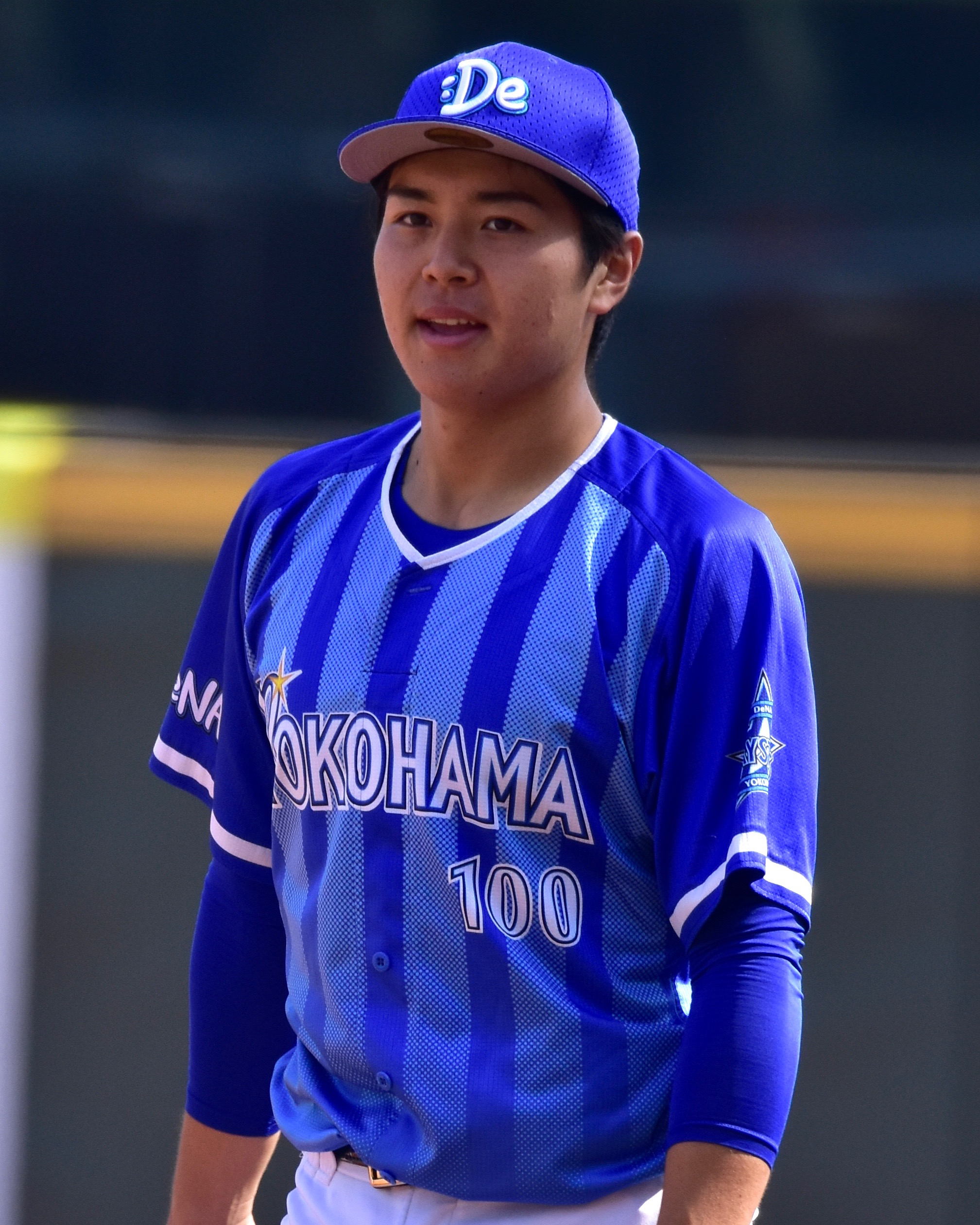
- Amiya with the Yokohama DeNA BayStars
- Catcher, first baseman, third baseman
- Born: October 3, 1997 (age 28); Ichihara, Chiba, Japan
- Bats: Right Throws: Right
- Stats at Baseball Reference

Teams
- Yokohama DeNA BayStars (2016–2018)

Keishō Amiya (網谷 圭将, Amiya Keishō; born October 3, 1997) is a professional Japanese baseball player, who is currently a free agent. He previously played catcher for the Yokohama DeNA BayStars.
