= Toshiki Sakurai =

Japanese baseball player

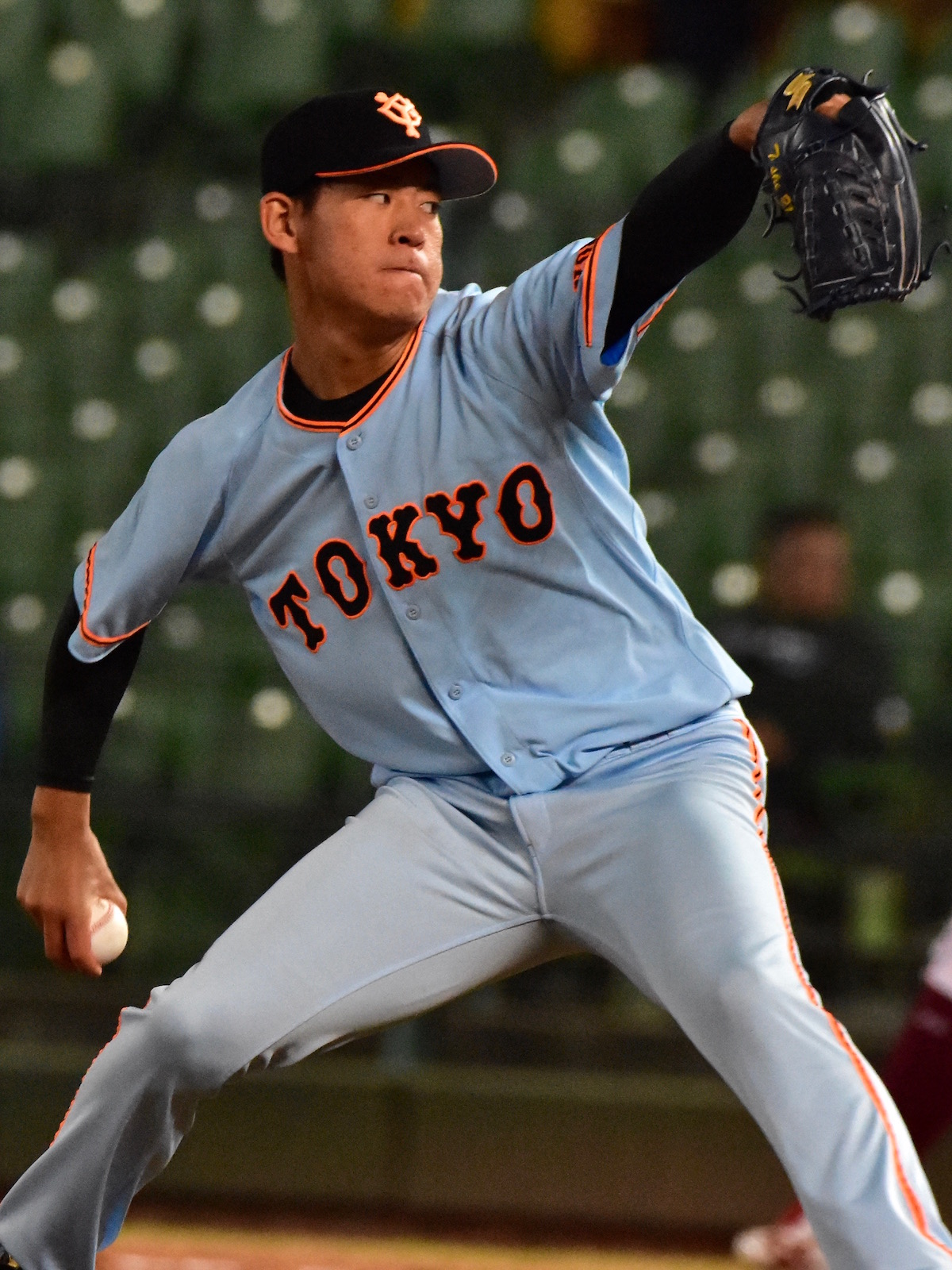
- Sakurai with the Yomiuri Giants
- Pitcher
- Born: October 21, 1993 (age 32); Kobe, Hyōgo, Japan
- Batted: Right Threw: Right

NPB debut
- March 30, 2016, for the Yomiuri Giants

Last NPB appearance
- October 7, 2022, for the Yomiuri Giants

Career statistics (through 2021 season)
- Win–loss record: 13-12
- Earned Run Average: 5.18
- Strikeouts: 175
- Saves: 0
- Stats at Baseball Reference

Teams
- Yomiuri Giants (2016–2022)

Toshiki Sakurai (桜井 俊貴, Sakurai Toshiki; born October 21, 1993 in Kobe, Hyōgo, Japan) is a professional Japanese baseball player. He plays pitcher for the Yomiuri Giants.
