= Kazutomo Iguchi =

Japanese baseball player (born 1994)

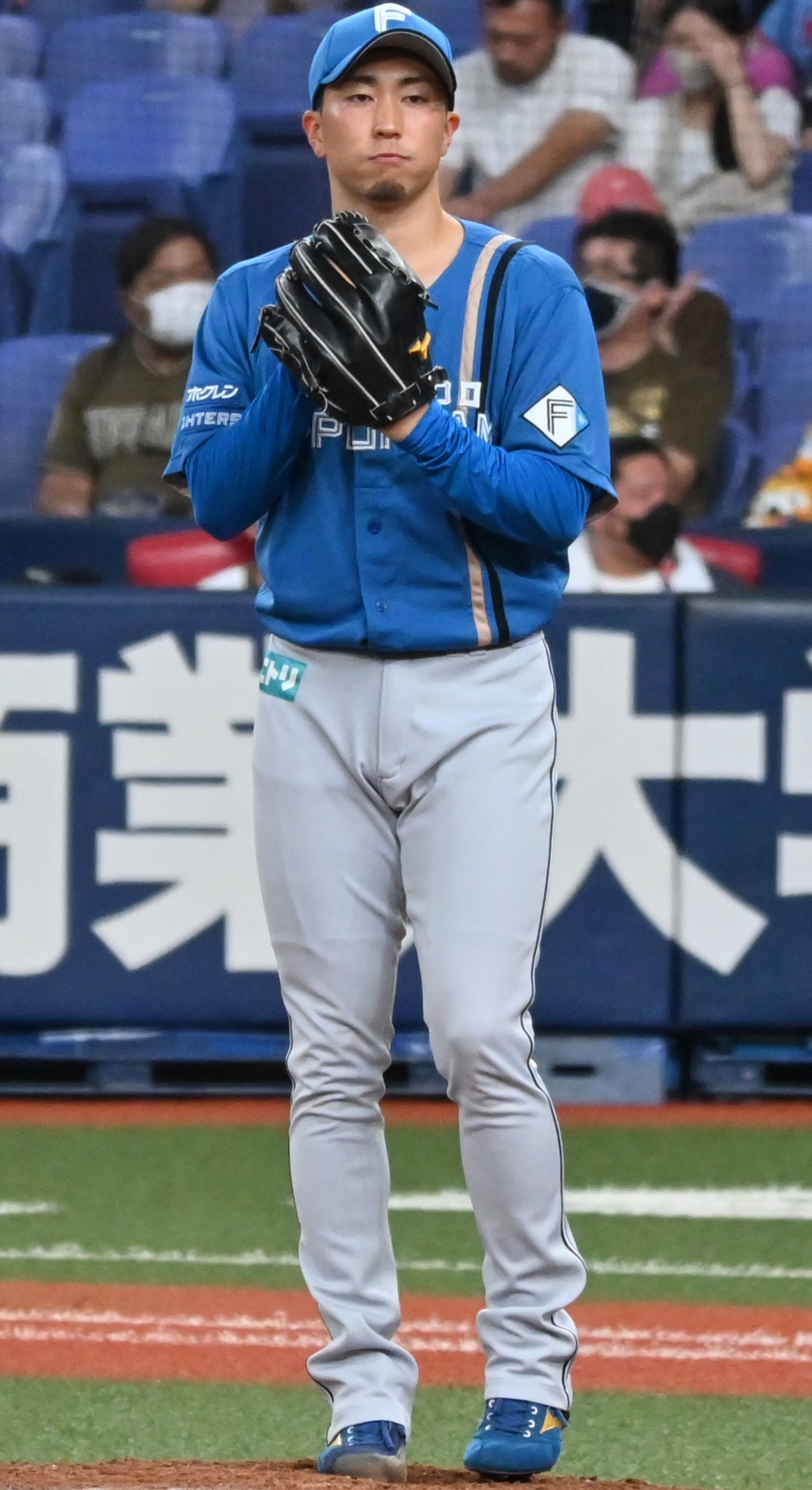
- Iguchi with the Hokkaido Nippon-Ham Fighters

Free agent
- Pitcher
- Born: January 7, 1994 (age 32); Yokohama, Kanagawa, Japan
- Bats: Right Throws: Right

NPB debut
- March 30, 2016, for the Hokkaido Nippon-Ham Fighters

NPB statistics (through 2025 season)
- Win–loss record: 7–7
- Earned run average: 3.66
- Strikeouts: 194
- Stats at Baseball Reference

Teams
- Hokkaido Nippon-Ham Fighters (2016–2023); Orix Buffaloes (2024–2025)

Kazutomo Iguchi (井口 和朋, Iguchi Kazutomo; born January 7, 1994) is a professional Japanese baseball pitcher who is a free agent. He has previously played in Nippon Professional Baseball (NPB) for the Hokkaido Nippon-Ham Fighters and Orix Buffaloes.

== Career ==
Iguchi began his career in Nippon Professional Baseball, playing for the Hokkaido Nippon-Ham Fighters from 2016 to 2023, and for the Orix Buffaloes from 2024 to 2025.

On April 17, 2026, Iguchi signed with El Águila de Veracruz of the Mexican League. He made two appearances for the team, recording a 4.50 ERA with two strikeouts across two innings pitched. Iguchi was released by Veracruz on May 15.
