= Keisuke Honda (baseball) =

Japanese baseball player (born 1993)

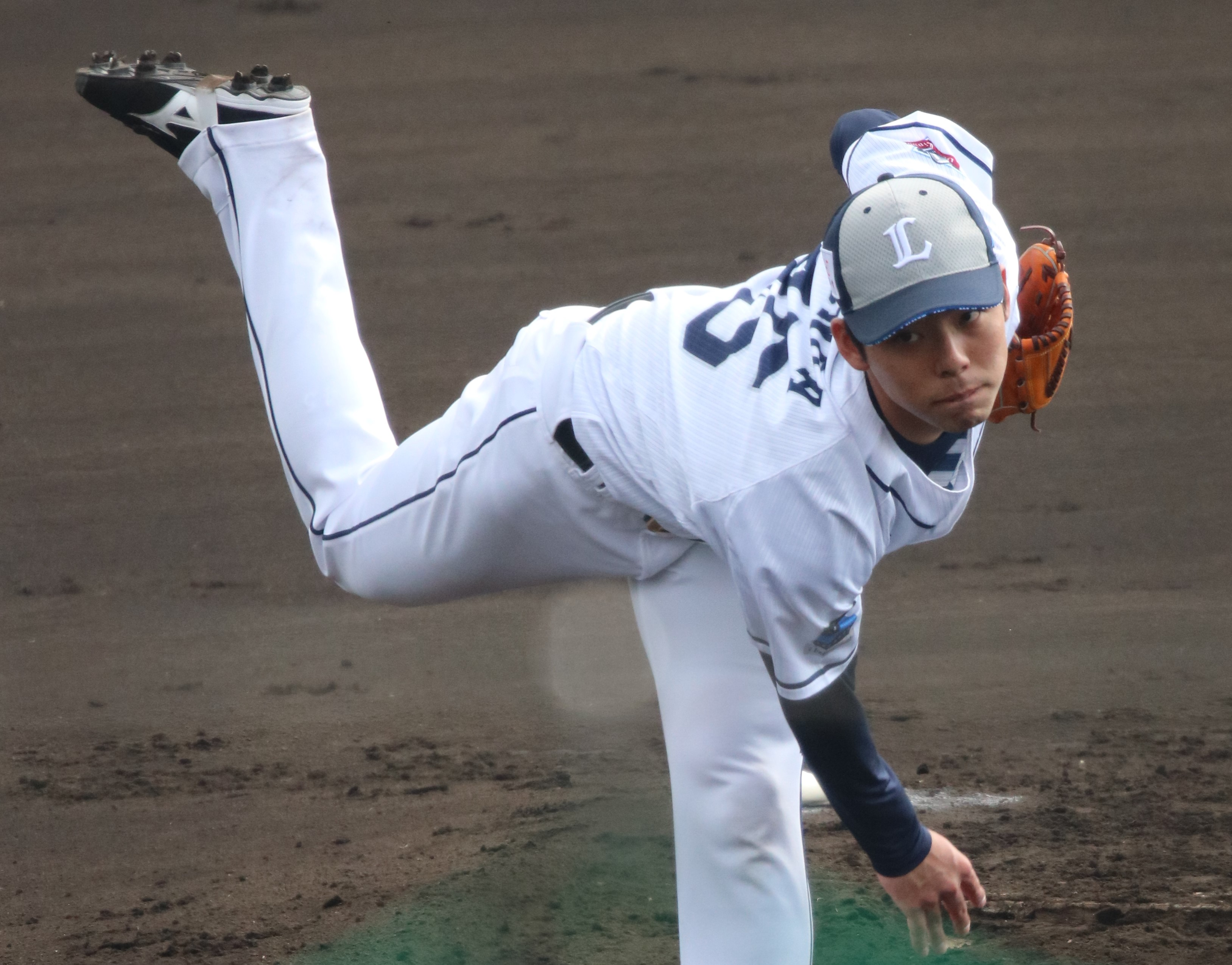

Orix Buffaloes – No. 60
- Pitcher
- Born: April 24, 1993 (age 32); Sendai, Miyagi, Japan
- Bats: Right Throws: Right

NPB debut
- September 11, 2016, for the Saitama Seibu Lions

Career statistics (through 2024 season)
- Win–loss record: 12-21
- Earned Run Average: 3.82
- Strikeouts: 174
- Saves: 0
- Holds: 32
- Stats at Baseball Reference

Teams
- Saitama Seibu Lions (2016–2024); Orix Buffaloes (2025–present)

Career highlights and awards
- 1x NPB All-Star (2022)

Keisuke Honda (本田 圭佑, Honda Keisuke; born April 24, 1993) is a professional Japanese baseball player. He plays pitcher for the Orix Buffaloes.

== Career ==
In 2022, Honda was named a NPB All-Star.
