= Daiki Watanabe =

Japanese baseball player

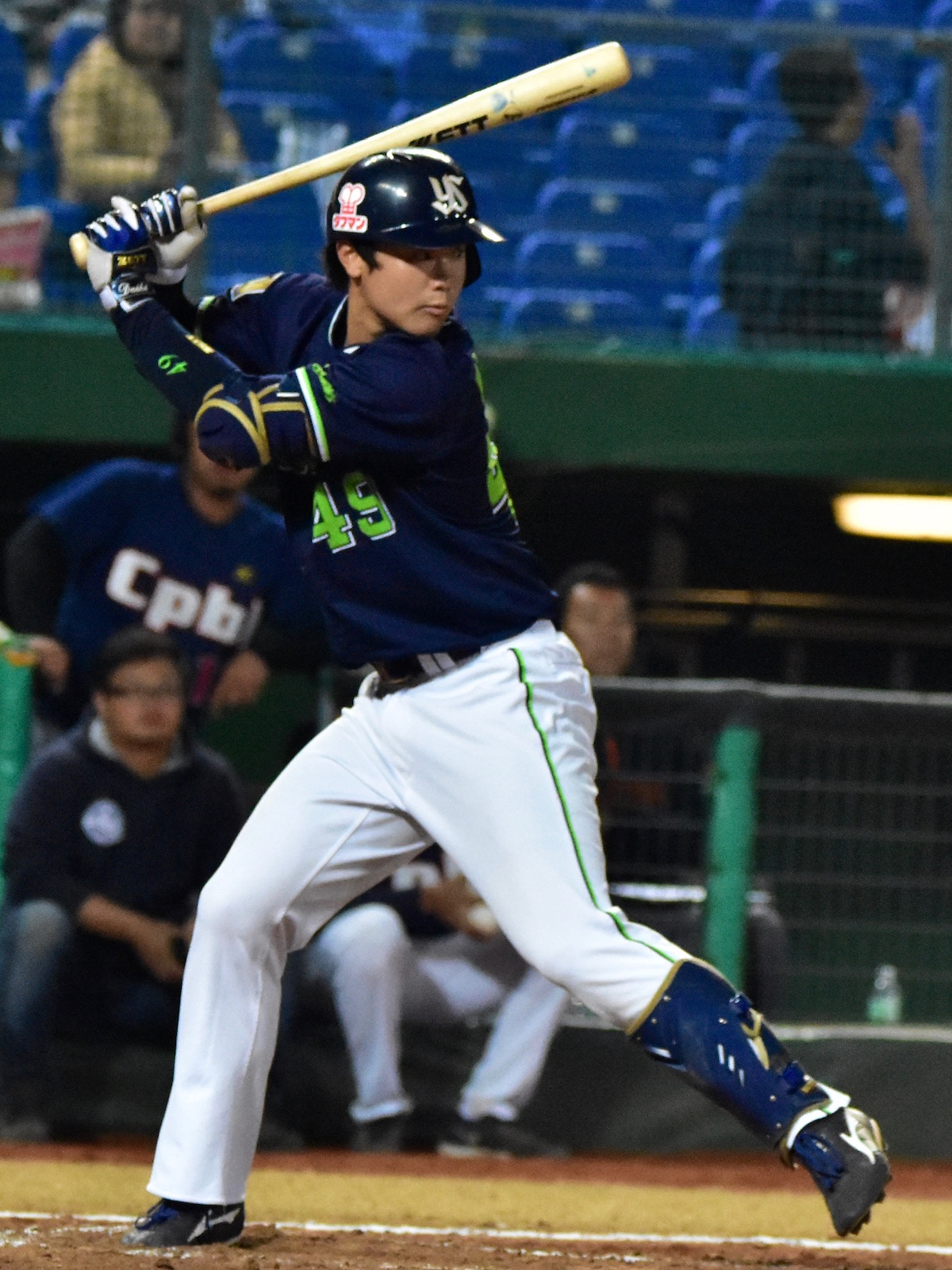
- Outfielder
- Born: June 7, 1997 (age 28); Matsudo, Chiba, Japan
- Bats: Right Throws: Right

NPB debut
- September 3, 2017, for the Tokyo Yakult Swallows

Career statistics (through 2021 season)
- Batting average: .182
- Hits: 10
- Home runs: 1
- RBIs: 4
- Stolen bases: 8
- Stats at Baseball Reference

Teams
- Tokyo Yakult Swallows (2016–2022); Orix Buffaloes (2023)

Career highlights and awards
- 1× Japan Series champion (2021)

Daiki Watanabe (渡邉 大樹, Watanabe Daiki; born June 7, 1997) is a professional Japanese baseball player. He plays outfielder for the Orix Buffaloes.
