= Koji Ohshiro =

Japanese baseball player (born 1993)

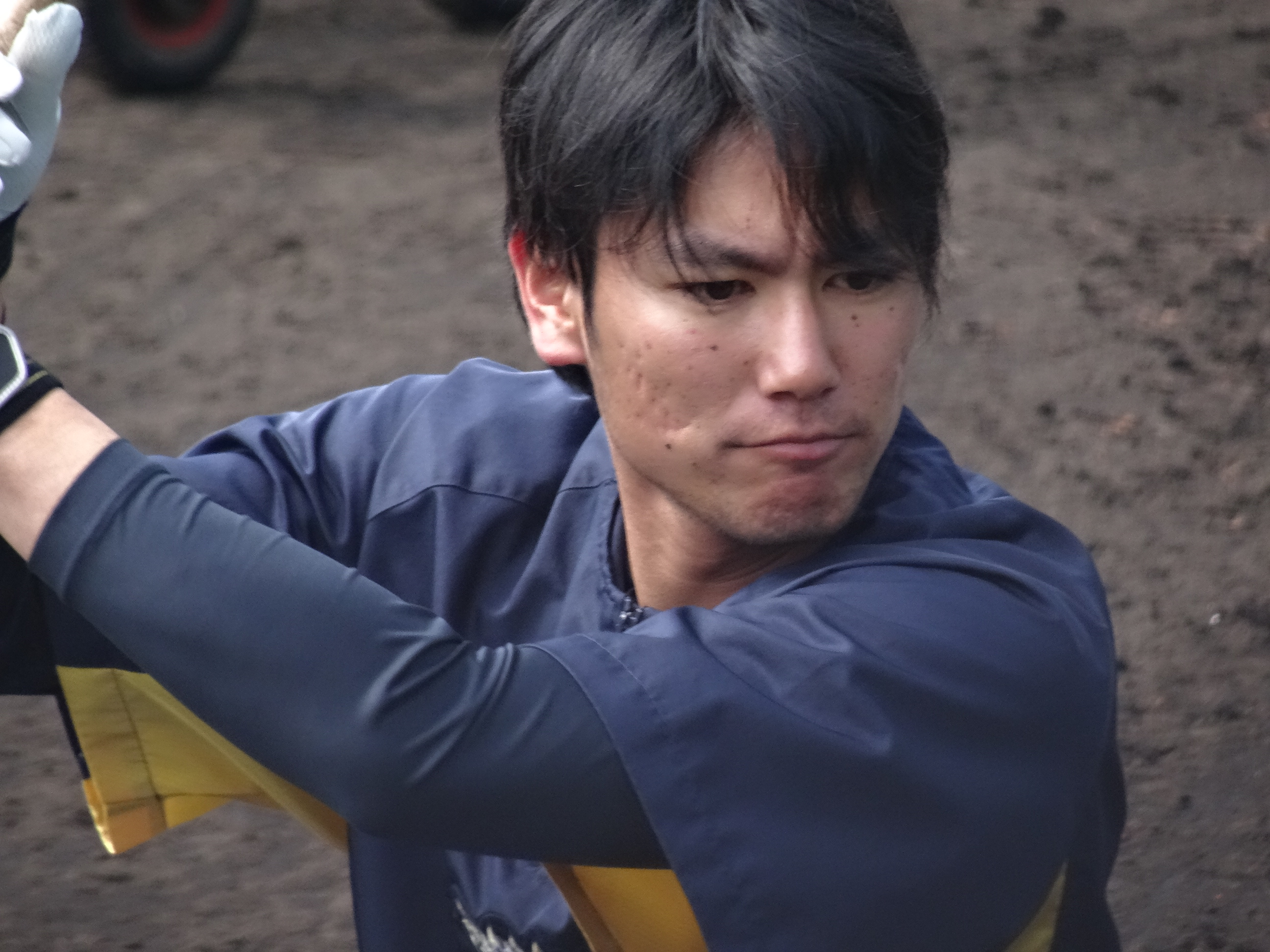

Orix Buffaloes – No. 10
- Infielder
- Born: June 14, 1993 (age 32); Shimajiri District, Okinawa, Japan
- Bats: Right Throws: Right

NPB debut
- April 3, 2016, for the Orix Buffaloes

NPB statistics (through 2021 season)
- Batting average: .234
- Hits: 350
- Home runs: 10
- RBIs: 103
- Stolen bases: 42
- Stats at Baseball Reference

Teams
- Orix Buffaloes (2016–present)

Career highlights and awards
- Japan Series champion (2022)

Koji Ohshiro (大城 滉二, Ohshiro Koji; born June 14, 1993) is a professional Japanese baseball player. He plays infielder for the Orix Buffaloes.
