= Akitake Okada =

Japanese baseball player

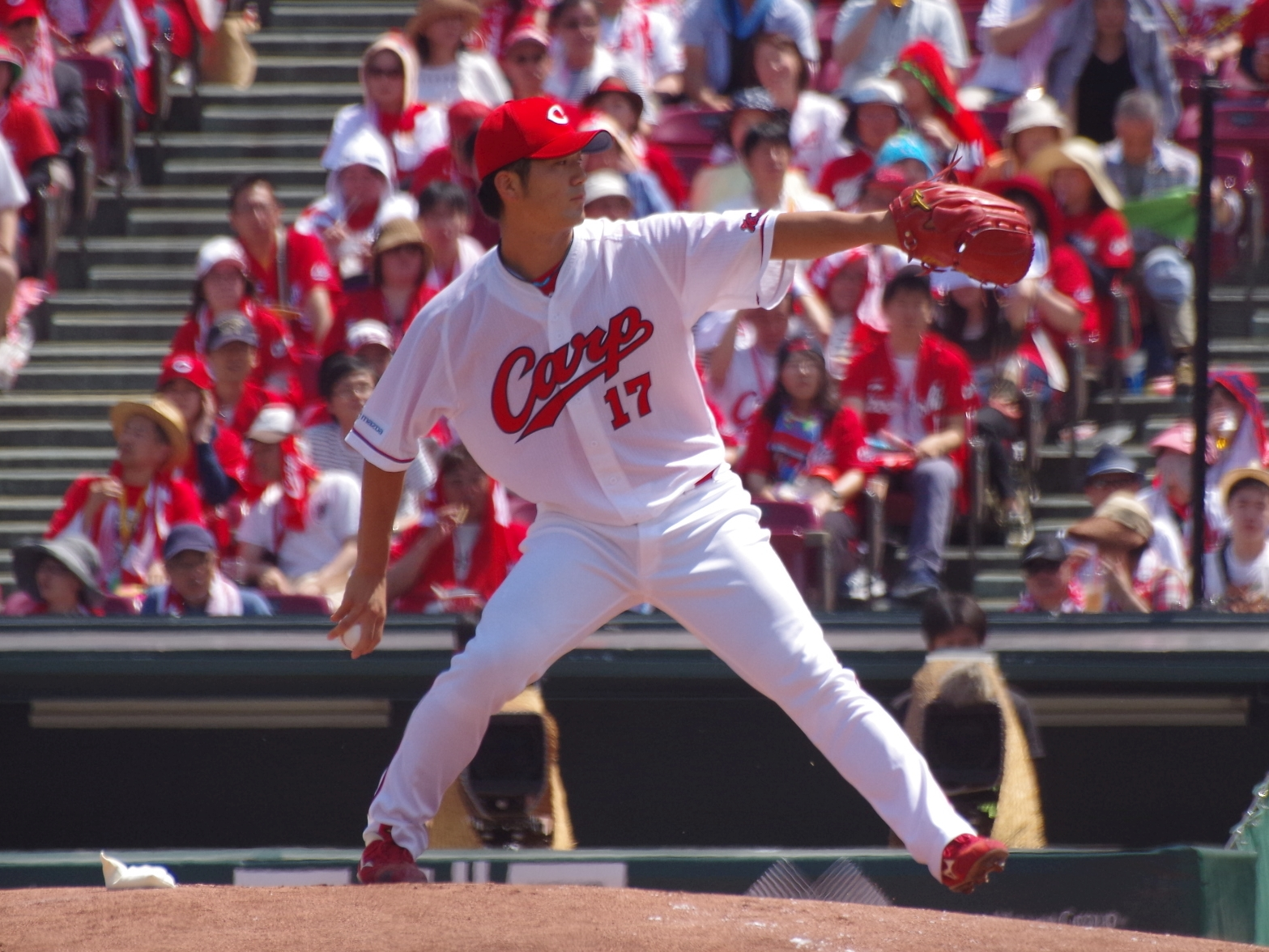

Ulsan Whales
- Pitcher
- Born: October 18, 1993 (age 32); Nerima, Tokyo, Japan
- Batted: Left Threw: Right

debut
- April 1, 2016, for the Hiroshima Toyo Carp

Last appearance
- August 14, 2019, for the Hiroshima Toyo Carp

NPB statistics
- Win–loss record: 24–17
- ERA: 4.36
- Strikeouts: 287
- Stats at Baseball Reference

Teams
- Hiroshima Toyo Carp (2016–2024); Ulsan Whales (2026–)

Akitake Okada (岡田 明丈, Okada Akitake; born October 18, 1993) is a professional Japanese baseball player. He plays pitcher for the Hiroshima Toyo Carp.

On November 1, 2018, he was selected Japan national baseball team at the 2018 MLB Japan All-Star Series.
