= Takuto Nogawa =

Japanese baseball player

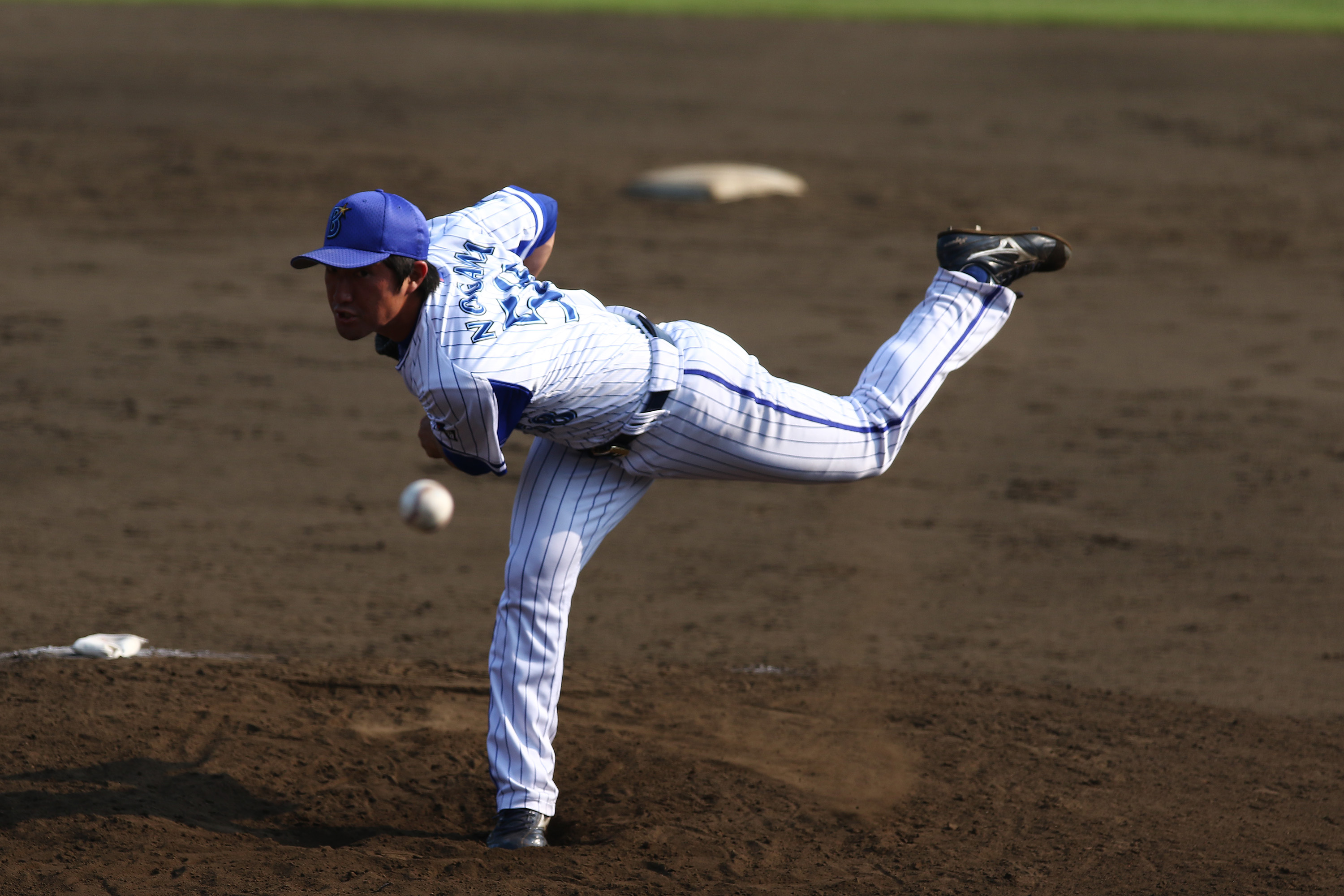
- Nogawa with the Yokohama DeNA BayStars
- Pitcher
- Born: September 6, 1991 (age 34); Toda, Saitama, Japan
- Bats: Left Throws: Left
- Stats at Baseball Reference

Teams
- Yokohama DeNA BayStars (2016–2018)

Takuto Nogawa (野川 拓斗, Nogawa Takuto; born September 6, 1991 in Toda, Saitama, Japan) is a former professional Japanese baseball player. He played pitcher for the Yokohama DeNA BayStars.
