= NPB Farm League =

- Classification: Ni gun (2026–present)
- Sport: Baseball
- Founded: 2026 (0 years ago)
- No. of teams: 14
- Country: Japan
- Website: npb.jp/farm

The NPB Farm League is the main minor league of Japanese professional baseball. The league was formed from a merger of the Eastern League and Western League in 2026, following a restructure of Japanese professional baseball, with six independent baseball leagues forming Japan Regional Professional Baseball being the other significant restructure in 2026.

The restructure was deemed necessary to improve financial stability amongst farm teams, by having reduced expenses for travel by having more games locally. The divisions are not permanent, with teams able to move between them as NPB farm teams start to relocate to their new facilities (e.g. Fighters farm team moving to Hokkaido by 2030).

== Structure and season ==
The league consists of 14 teams, 12 farm teams from the 12 NPB clubs, plus first teams from 2 unaffiliated clubs: Oisix Niigata Albirex and HAYATE Ventures Shizuoka. The 12 farm teams consist of the 42 players on the 70-man roster not on the first team, plus any registered development players. The other teams consist of players signed directly to the clubs: as these teams are not affiliated to clubs in the NPB, players cannot accrue NPB professional service days, and remain eligible for the NPB draft, the same way JRPB players are.

The league is currently based on a round robin system with teams playing a maximum of 146 games in a season. The number of scheduled games will vary from team to team, and games that are cancelled will not be replaced. The league championship is thus decided on winning percentage. In the two weeks preceding the season, 40 educational games are played in the Spring Educational League.

The league is divided into three regional divisions: East, Central, and West. The East and Central divisions each have five teams, while the West has four, with playing blocks of six intra-divisional series, followed by two series of inter-divisional games. This cycle repeats across the season.

An All-Star game is held between Central League and Pacific League Select teams, with players playing for the select team their parent club aligns with. The two non-affiliated clubs will be aligned with either Central or Pacific to allow their players to enter the All-Star game.

The champion of the league is determined by the Farm Japan Championship after the regular season. The three division winners qualify automatically with the second-place team with the highest winning percentage across the three divisions earning a wild-card berth, for a total of four teams. At the end of each season, individual awards are given to players in each division.

== Current teams ==
Team	Location	Stadiums	Capacity	Joined league	Manager
East Divison
Chiba Lotte Marines (2nd team)	Saitama, Saitama	Lotte Urawa Baseball Stadium	300	2026	Kazuya Fukuura
Hokkaido Nippon-Ham Fighters (2nd team)	Kamagaya, Chiba	Fighters Kamagaya Stadium	2,400	2026	Atsunori Inaba
Oisix Niigata Albirex	Niigata, Niigata	HARD OFF ECO Stadium Niigata	30,000	2026	Masaru Takeda
Tohoku Rakuten Golden Eagles (2nd team)	Sendai, Miyagi	Rakuten Eagles Izumi Ground	200	2026	Naoto Watanabe
Tokyo Yakult Swallows (2nd team)	Toda, Saitama	Yakult Toda Baseball Stadium	250	2026	Noriyuki Shiroishi
Central Divison
Chunichi Dragons (2nd team)	Nagoya, Aichi	Nagoya Stadium	4,495	2026	Yuji Iiyama
HAYATE Ventures Shizuoka	Shizuoka, Shizuoka	Chu〜Ru Stadium Shimizu	10,000	2026	Motoyuki Akahori
Saitama Seibu Lions (2nd team)	Tokorozawa, Saitama	Seibu Second Baseball Stadium	300	2026	Tatsuya Koseki
Yokohama DeNA Baystars (2nd team)	Yokosuka, Kanagawa	Yokosuka Stadium	5,000	2026	Shuichi Murata
Yomiuri Giants (2nd team)	Inagi, Tokyo	GIANTS TOWN STADIUM	2,900	2026	Takuro Ishii
West Divison
Fukuoka SoftBank Hawks (2nd team)	Chikugo, Fukuoka	HAWKS Baseball Park Chikugo	3,113	2026	Kazumi Saito
Hanshin Tigers (2nd team)	Amagasaki, Hyōgo	SGL Stadium	3,600	2026	Katsuo Hirata
Hiroshima Toyo Carp (2nd team)	Iwakuni, Yamaguchi	Hiroshima Toyo Carp Yu Training Ground	3,500	2026	Shinji Koh
Orix Buffaloes (2nd team)	Osaka, Osaka	Maishima Baseball Stadium	8,000	2026	Naoyuki Kazaoka
