= Adam Walker (baseball) =

American baseball player (born 1991)

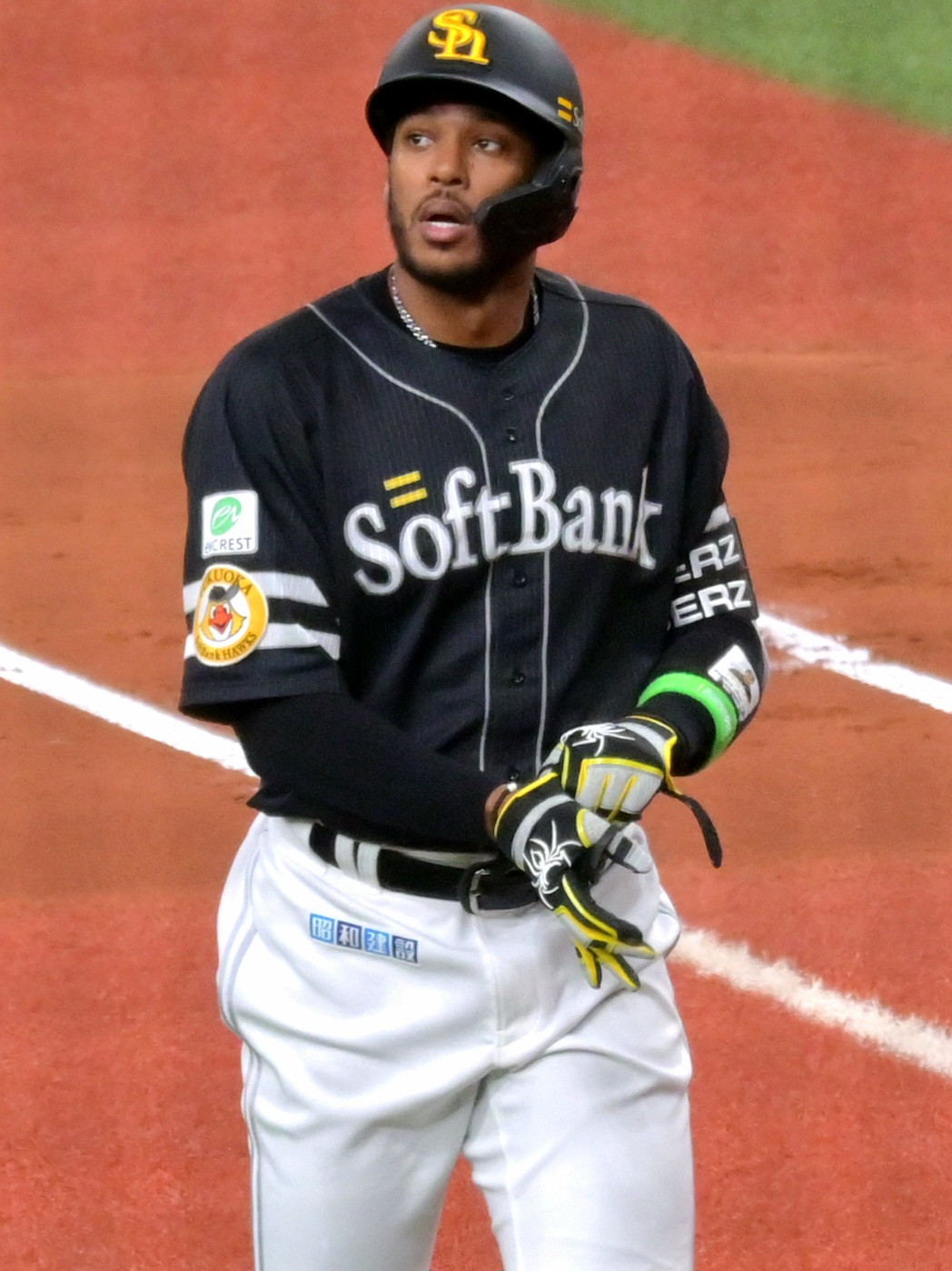
- Walker with the Fukuoka SoftBank Hawks in 2024

Rakuten Monkeys – No. 74
- Outfielder
- Born: October 18, 1991 (age 35); Milwaukee, Wisconsin, U.S.
- Bats: Right Throws: Right

Professional debut
- NPB: March 26, 2022, for the Yomiuri Giants
- CPBL: July 24, 2026, for the Rakuten Monkeys

NPB statistics (through 2024 season)
- Batting Average: .258
- Home Runs: 30
- Runs batted in: 75

CPBL statistics (through August 12, 2026)
- Batting Average: .245
- Home Runs: 4
- Runs batted in: 10
- Stats at Baseball Reference

Teams
- Yomiuri Giants (2022–2023); Fukuoka SoftBank Hawks (2024); Rakuten Monkeys (2026–present)

Career highlights and awards
- NPB All-Star (2022)

Adam Brett Walker II (born October 18, 1991) is an American professional baseball outfielder for the Rakuten Monkeys of the Chinese Professional Baseball League (CPBL). He has previously played in Nippon Professional Baseball (NPB) for the Yomiuri Giants and Fukuoka SoftBank Hawks. He was drafted by the Minnesota Twins in the 3rd round of the 2012 Major League Baseball draft.

== Amateur career ==
A native of Milwaukee, Wisconsin, Walker played college baseball at Jacksonville University. In 2011, he played collegiate summer baseball with the Hyannis Harbor Hawks of the Cape Cod Baseball League.

== Professional career ==
=== Minnesota Twins ===
Walker was drafted in the 3rd round, 97th overall, by the Minnesota Twins in the 2012 Major League Baseball draft. He signed with the Twins on June 17, receiving a signing bonus of $490,400. Walker made his professional debut for the rookie-level Elizabethton Twins and hit 14 home runs in 58 games. In 2013, Walker played in 129 games for the Single-A Cedar Rapids Kernels, batting .278/.319/.526 with 27 home runs and 109 runs batted in. He played for the High-A Fort Myers Miracle the following year, posting a slash of .246/.307/.436 with 25 home runs and 94 runs batted-in, in 132 contests. In 2015, Walker played for the Double-A Chattanooga Lookouts, hitting .239/.309/.498 with a career-high 31 home runs and 106 runs batted in during 133 games. After the 2015 season, Walker was ranked #10 on Minnesota's top 30 prospects list. On November 20, 2015, the Twins added Walker to the 40-man roster to protect him from the Rule 5 draft. Walker spent the 2016 campaign with the Triple-A Rochester Red Wings, hitting .243/.305/.479 with 27 home runs and 75 runs batted in across 132 games for the team.

=== Atlanta Braves ===
On November 18, 2016, Walker was claimed off waivers by the Milwaukee Brewers. On November 28, the Brewers designated Walker for assignment. On December 2, Walker was claimed off waivers by the Baltimore Orioles. On January 20, 2017, the Orioles designated Walker for assignment. On January 26, Walker was claimed off waivers by the Atlanta Braves. On January 31, he was outrighted off of the 40-man roster. Walker began 2017 with the Triple-A Gwinnett Braves, but hit just .128/.205/.282 in 10 games before he was demoted to the Double-A Mississippi Braves. Walker hit .122/.182/.388 in 14 contests before he was released by the Braves organization on May 9.

=== Baltimore Orioles ===
On May 10, 2017, Walker signed a minor league contract with the Baltimore Orioles organization. Walker was assigned to the Double-A Bowie Baysox and in 12 games hit .426/.449/.915 with 6 home runs and 12 runs batted in for the team before he was promoted to the Triple-A Norfolk Tides. After limping to an .090/.090/.164 line in 18 games for Norfolk, he was released by the Orioles on July 23.

=== Cincinnati Reds ===
On August 4, 2017, Walker signed a minor league contract with the Cincinnati Reds organization. He was assigned to the Triple-A Louisville Bats, where he would spend the rest of the season, hitting .207/.275/.370 in 25 appearances. He elected free agency on November 6, 2017.

=== Kansas City T-Bones ===
On April 23, 2018, Walker signed with the Kansas City T-Bones of the American Association of Professional Baseball Walker ended up playing in 3 games for the T-Bones, getting 2 hits in 11 at-bats.

=== Washington Nationals ===
On May 23, 2018, Walker signed a minor league deal with the Washington Nationals. Walker was assigned to the Double-A Harrisburg Senators and posted a slash of .200/.324/.383 in 41 contests. He elected free agency following the season on November 2.

=== Milwaukee Milkmen ===
On April 2, 2019, Walker signed with the Milwaukee Milkmen of the American Association. He played in 98 games for the Milkmen in 2019, carrying a .249/.299/.478 batting mark. On February 12, 2020, Walker re-signed with the Milkmen for the 2020 season. Walker hit .268/.320/.609 with 22 home runs and 50 runs batted in across in 57 games with the Milkmen and would go on to win the American Association championship with the team. Following the season, Walker was named the American Association player of the year.

In 2021, Walker played in 101 games for the Milkmen, and clubbed a league-leading 33 home runs with 101 runs batted in and a slash of .320/.369/.636. Following the year, Walker was named the American Association player of the year for the second consecutive season, becoming the first player in American Association history to win the Most Valuable Player award in back-to-back seasons.

=== Yomiuri Giants ===
On December 15, 2021, Walker signed with the Yomiuri Giants of Nippon Professional Baseball (NPB). He made his NPB debut on March 26, 2022. In 124 games for the team, he batted .271/.306/.515 with 23 home runs and 52 RBI. Walker played in 57 games for Yomiuri in 2023, hitting .263/.275/.483 with 6 home runs and 20 RBI.

=== Fukuoka SoftBank Hawks ===
On November 5, 2023, Walker was traded to the Fukuoka SoftBank Hawks in exchange for Keisuke Izumi and Rei Takahashi. In 20 games for SoftBank in 2024, he batted .169/.182/.262 with one home run, three RBI, and one stolen base. On December 2, 2024, the Hawks announced that they would not be offering Walker a contract in 2025, making him a free agent.

=== Kanagawa Future Dreams ===
On April 25, 2025, Walker signed with the Kanagawa Future Dreams of the Baseball Challenge League.

=== Oisix Albriex ===
On December 16, 2025, Walker signed with the Oisix Albriex, which is an unaffiliated, independent team in the NPB's developmental Eastern League.

=== Rakuten Monkeys ===
On July 6, 2026, Walker signed with the Rakuten Monkeys of the Chinese Professional Baseball League.

== Personal life ==
His father, Adam Walker, played in the National Football League (NFL) for the Minnesota Vikings in 1987.
