= Tetsuro Nishida =

Japanese baseball player (born 1991)

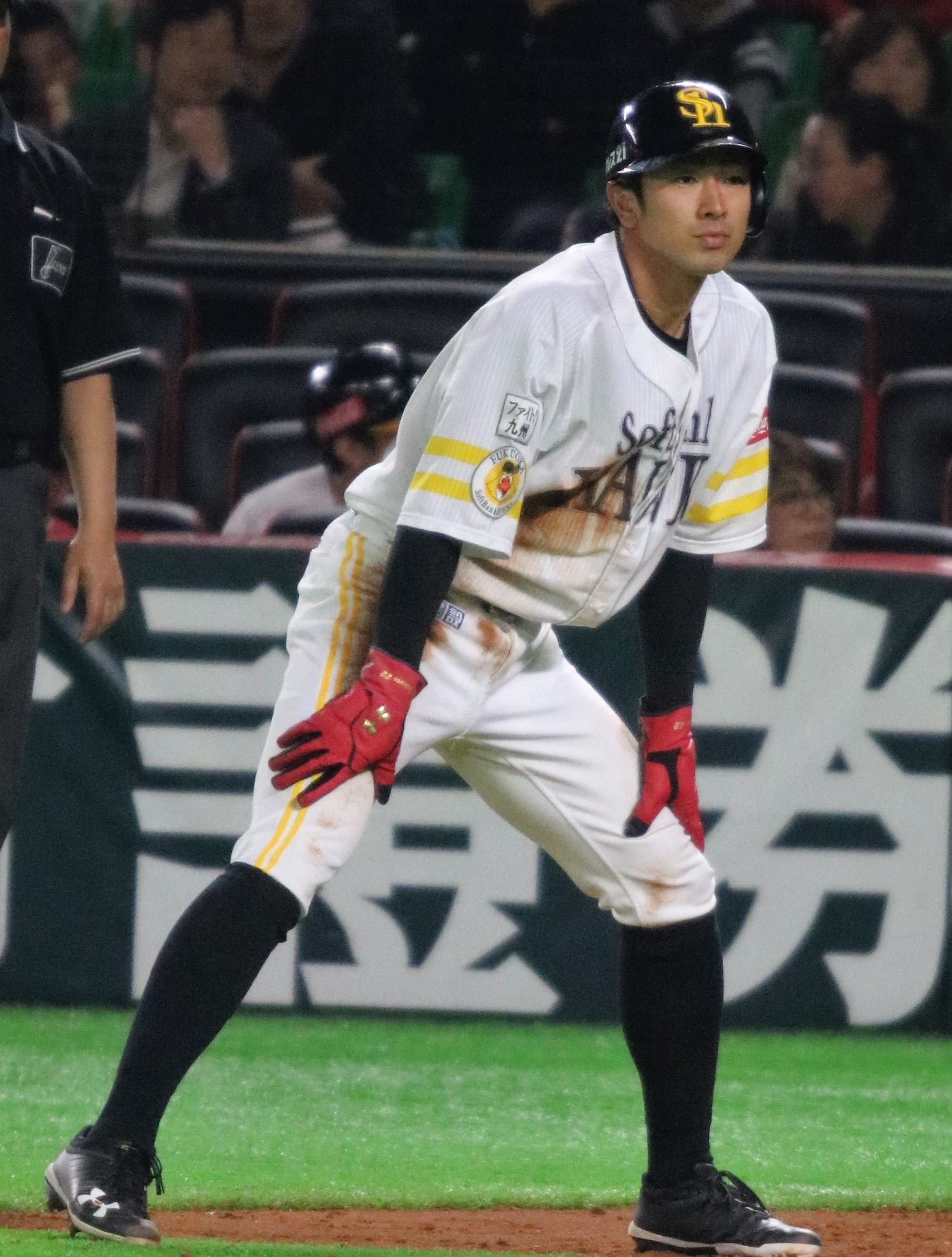
- Nishida with the Fukuoka SoftBank Hawks
- Shortstop
- Born: September 4, 1991 (age 35); Ibaraki, Osaka
- Batted: Right Threw: Right

NPB debut
- October 15, 2011, for the Tohoku Rakuten Golden Eagles

Last NPB appearance
- September 25, 2020, for the Fukuoka SoftBank Hawks

NPB statistics (through 2020 season)
- Batting average: .219
- Home runs: 13
- RBI: 71
- Hits: 171
- Stolen base: 16
- Sacrifice bunt: 23
- Stats at Baseball Reference

Teams
- Tohoku Rakuten Golden Eagles (2010–2017); Fukuoka SoftBank Hawks (2018–2020)

Career highlights and awards
- 2× Japan Series Champion (2013, 2018)

Tetsuro Nishida (西田 哲朗, born September 4, 1991, in Ibaraki, Osaka) is a Japanese former professional baseball player who is currently a staff for the Fukuoka SoftBank Hawks of Nippon Professional Baseball (NPB). He has played in NPB for the Tohoku Rakuten Golden Eagles and Hawks.

== Career ==
=== Tohoku Rakuten Golden Eagles ===
Tohoku Rakuten Golden Eagles selected Nishida with the second selection in the 2009 NPB draft.

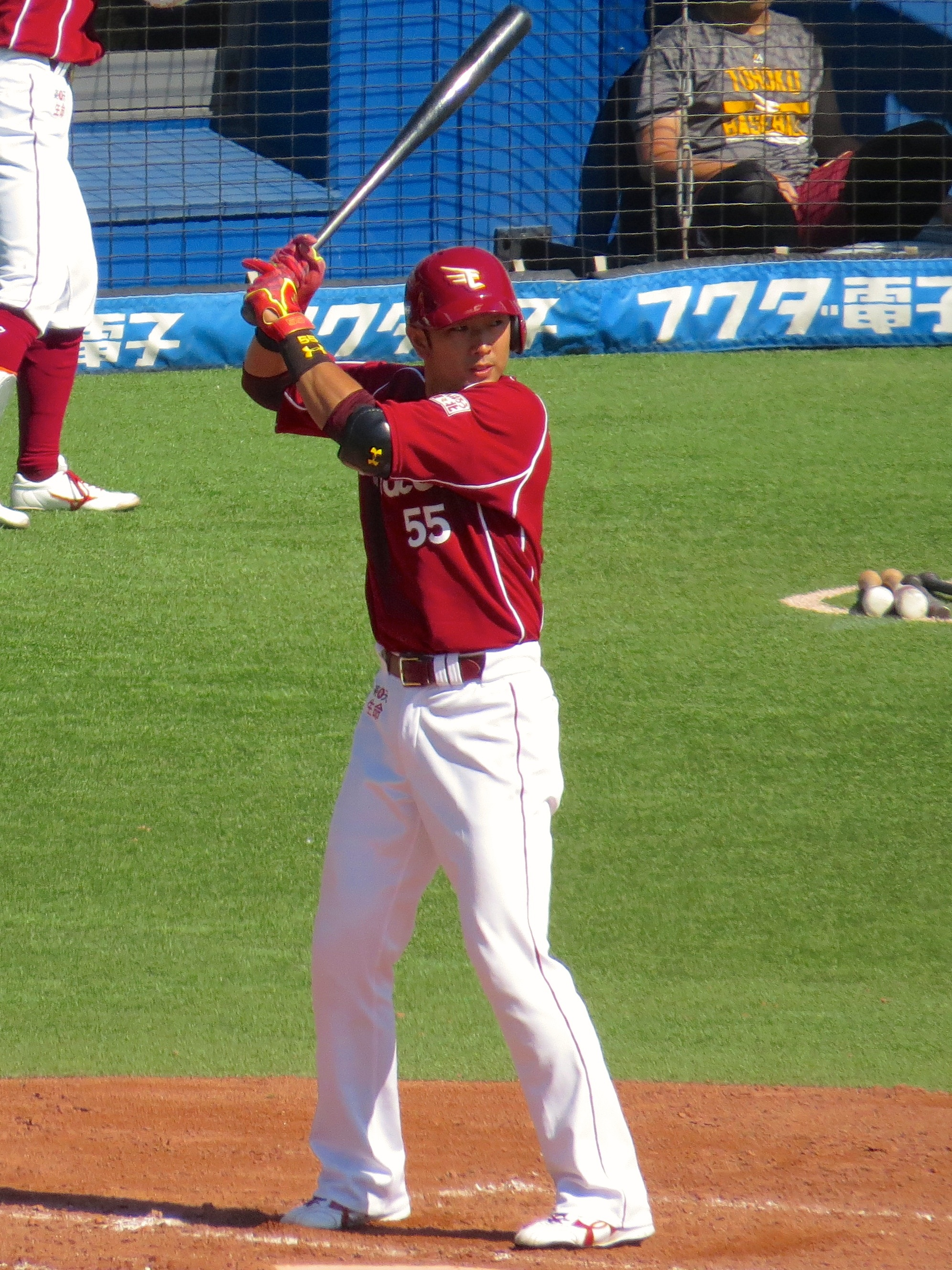
Nishida with the Tohoku Rakuten Golden Eagles.

In 2010 season, Nishida played in the Eastern League of NPB's minor leagues.

On October 15, 2011, Nishida debuted in the Pacific League against the Saitama Seibu Lions.

On September 14, 2012, Nishida recorded his first hit and RBI. In 2012 season, he played 20 games in the Pacific League.

In 2013 season, Nishida played 26 games in the Pacific League. And he was selected as the Japan Series roster in the 2013 Japan Series.

On May 10, 2014, Nishida recorded his first home run. In 2014 season, he finished the regular season in 126 games with a batting average of .250, a 7 home runs, a RBI of 41, and a 8 stolen bases.

In 2015 season, Nishida finished the regular season in 62 games with a batting average of .220, a one home runs, a RBI of 8, and a 2 stolen bases.

In 2016 season, Nishida played 11 games in the Pacific League.

In 2017 season, Nishida played 22 games in the Pacific League.

=== Fukuoka SoftBank Hawks ===
On November 14, 2017, the Tohoku Rakuten Golden Eagles traded Nishida to the Fukuoka SoftBank Hawks for Ayatsugu Yamashita.

In 2018 season, Nishida finished the regular season in 72 games with a batting average of .211, a 4 home runs, a RBI of 16, and a 3 stolen bases. In the 2018 Pacific League Climax Series against the Saitama Seibu Lions, Nishida played an active part in five games with a batting average of .583 (7 hits in 17 at bats). And he played in the 2018 Japan Series and recorded his first hit and RBI in the Japan Series.

In 2019 season, Nishida injured his left flank on April 3 and his right flank on July 26. As a result, he played only seven games.

In 2020 season, Nishida played 36 games in the Pacific League. On December 2, 2020, he became a free agent. On December 23, 2020, he announced his retirement. On December 25, 2020, he became a staff for the Hawks of NPB.
