= Rei Takahashi =

Japanese baseball player (born 1995)

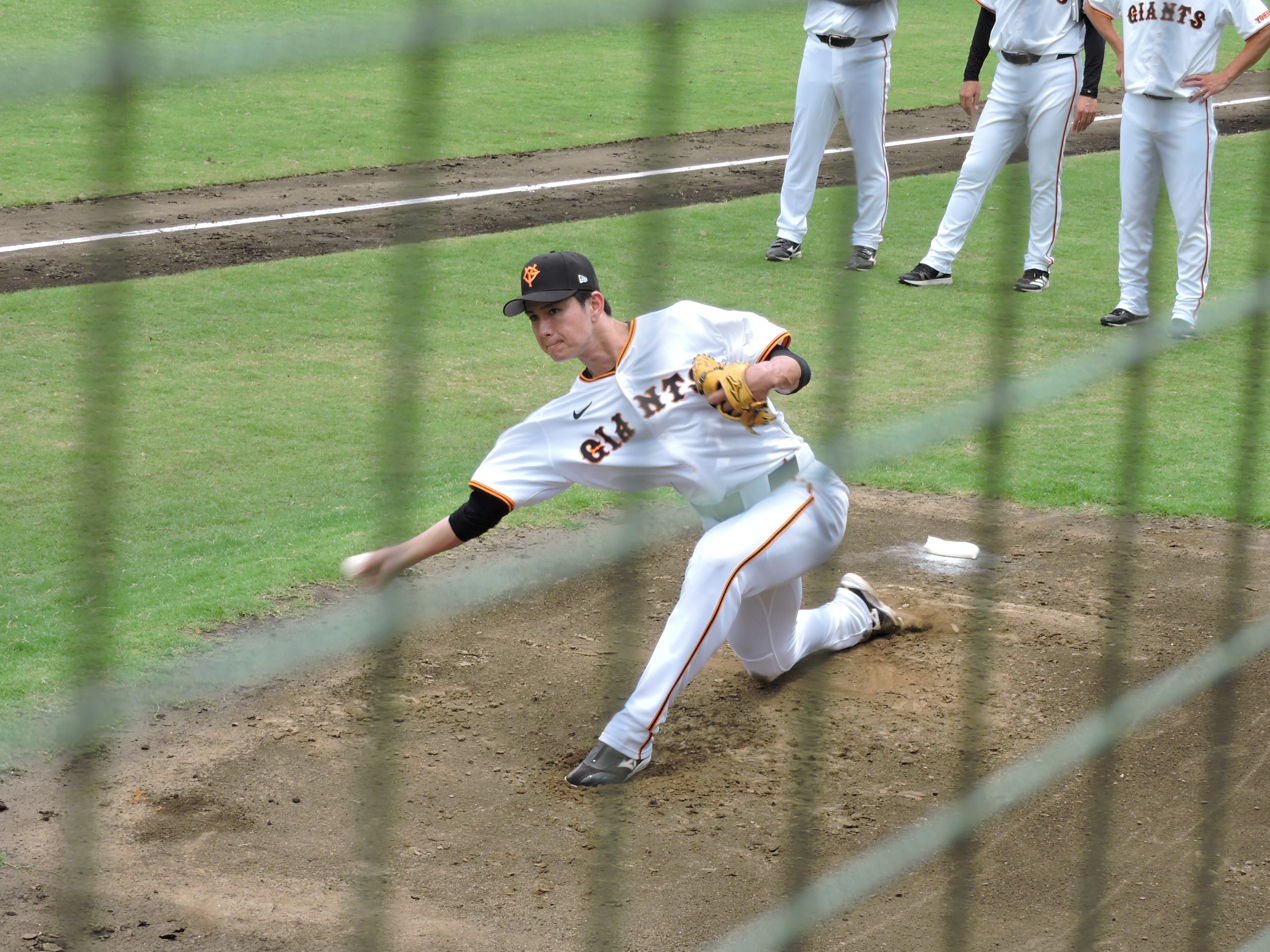
- Takahashi with the Yomiuri Giants

Saitama Seibu Lions – No. 136
- Pitcher
- Born: November 2, 1995 (age 30); Matsudo, Chiba, Japan
- Bats: Right Throws: Right

NPB debut
- April 22, 2018, for the Fukuoka SoftBank Hawks

NPB statistics (through 2024 season)
- Win–loss record: 19–14
- ERA: 3.89
- Strikeouts: 157
- Stats at Baseball Reference

Teams
- Fukuoka SoftBank Hawks (2018–2023); Yomiuri Giants (2024–2025)

Career highlights and awards
- NPB All-Star (2019); 3× Japan Series Champion (2018–2020); 2019 Pacific League Rookie of the Year; Pacific League Speed Up Award (2019)
Medals
Men's baseball
Representing Japan
WBSC Premier12
Gold medal – first place	2019 Tokyo	Team

Rei Takahashi (高橋 礼, Takahashi Rei; born November 2, 1995 in Matsudo, Chiba Prefecture) is a Japanese professional baseball pitcher for the Saitama Seibu Lions of the Nippon Professional Baseball (NPB). He has previously played in NPB for the Fukuoka SoftBank Hawks and Yomiuri Giants.

== Professional career ==
=== Fukuoka SoftBank Hawks ===
On October 26, 2017, Takahashi was drafted by the Fukuoka Softbank Hawks in the 2017 Nippon Professional Baseball draft.

On April 22, 2018, Takahashi pitched his debut game against the Hokkaido Nippon-Ham Fighters as a starting pitcher. In 2018 season, he finished the regular season with a 12 Games pitched, a 0–1 Win–loss record, a 3.00 ERA, a 15 strikeouts in 30 innings. And he pitched against the Hiroshima Toyo Carp as a relief pitcher in the 2018 Japan Series.

On March 31, 2019, Takahashi won the game for the first time in the Pacific League. Through 2019, he was 12–6 with two saves and a 3.34 ERA in 62 games (3 starts). On October 20, he pitched against the Yomiuri Giants as a starting pitcher, and won the game for the first time in the Japan Series. And he was honored with the 2019 Japan Series Excellent Player Award. On November 26, Takahashi was honored with the 2019 Pacific League Rookie of the Year Award.

In 2020 season, Takahashi hurt his left thigh during spring training. As a result, he pitched as a relief pitcher in the 2020 season and finished the regular season with a 52 Games pitched, a 4–2 Win–loss record, a 2.65 ERA, a 23 Holds, a 29 strikeouts in 51 innings. In the 2020 Japan Series against the Yomiuri Giants, He pitched in Game 2 and Game 4 as a relief pitcher, with no hits no runs in both games and a Hold in Game 4 to contribute to the team's fourth consecutive Japan Series champion.

In 2021, Takahashi finished the regular season with 11 games pitched, a 1–1 win–loss record, a 5.82 ERA, and 14 strikeouts across 34 innings.

In 2022, he only pitched in 4 games, accumulating a 0–0 win–loss record, a 13.50 ERA, and 2 strikeouts across 3.1 innings.

In 2023, Takahashi played as a starting pitcher but only pitched in 5 games.

=== Yomiuri Giants ===
On November 6, 2023, Takahashi and Keisuke Izumi were traded to the Yomiuri Giants exchange for Adam Brett Walker.

On October 2, 2025, Takahashi was released by the Giants after not making a first-team appearance that year.

=== Saitama Seibu Lions ===
On December 16, 2025, Takahashi signed with the Saitama Seibu Lions as a development player.

== International career ==
Takahashi represented the Japan national baseball team in the 2015 Summer Universiade, 2018 MLB Japan All-Star Series, 2019 exhibition games against Mexico, and 2019 WBSC Premier12 tournament.

On October 18, 2018, he was selected at the 2018 MLB Japan All-Star Series.

On October 1, 2019, he was selected at the 2019 WBSC Premier12. He led the tournament in groundouts induced, with 21.

== Pitching style ==
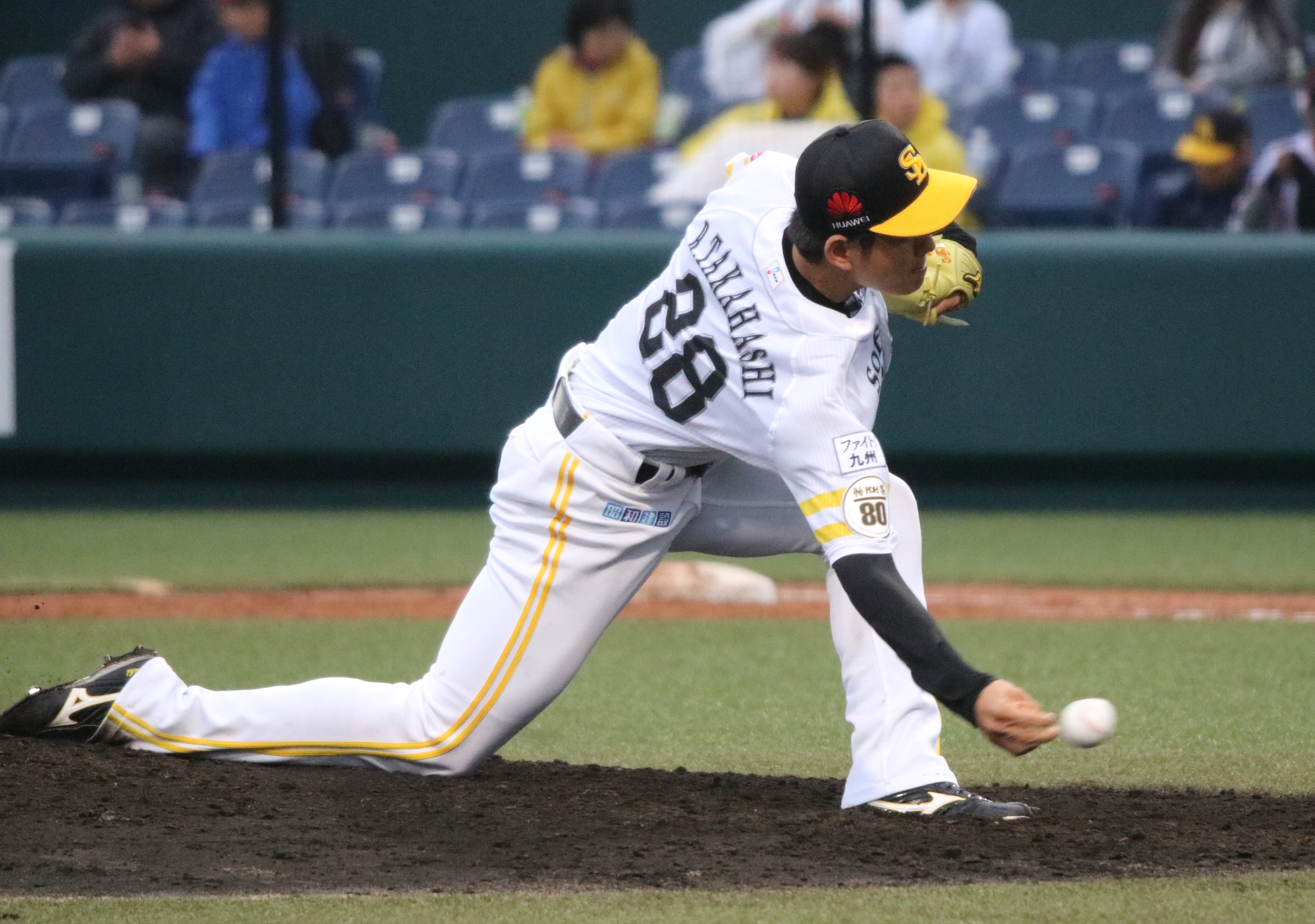
Takahashi delivers a pitch with a submarine motion in 2018.

Takahashi is a tall pitcher and he has a style of delivery that transitions from starting at windup position with his baseball glove raised above the head to finishing submarine with a low release point.

Takahashi's fastball tops out at 146 km/h, unusual for submarine pitchers.

And he throws a curveball, a sinker and a slider.

His pitching style is nicknamed Reiwa no Submarine (令和のサブマリン).
