= Niigata Albirex Baseball Club =

Oisix Niigata Albirex

Logo	Cap insignia

Information
- League: Eastern League
- Ballpark: Niigata Prefectural Baseball Stadium
- Established: 2006
- League championships: 1 (2012)
- Division championships: 2 (2011, 2012)
- Former league: Baseball Challenge League (2007–2023)
- Colors: Blue and orange
- Ownership: Niigata Albirex Baseball Club Inc.
- Manager: Masaru Takeda

Oisix Niigata Albirex Baseball Club (オイシックス新潟アルビレックス・ベースボール・クラブ, Oishikkusu Niigata Arubirekkusu Bēsubōru Kura) is a professional baseball team based in Niigata Prefecture, Japan. Founded in 2006, it competes in the Eastern League, one of the two minor leagues ("ni-gun") of Japanese professional baseball.

The club was member of the Baseball Challenge League from its debut season in 2007 until 2023. In 2024, it joined the Eastern League as the only team in the competition not affiliated with any Nippon Professional Baseball (NPB) franchise.

== History ==
After failing to secure a Nippon Professional Baseball (NPB) franchise during the 2004 realignment, Albirex Niigata’s owner founded the Niigata Albirex Baseball Club and co-founded the independent Baseball Challenge League with other entities in 2006.

The team hired former Yomiuri Giants player Kōji Gotō as its manager and recruited several local players to strengthen ties with the community. The inaugural season of the Baseball Challenge League opened on 28 April 2007 and Albirex lost its debut game 0–9 to the Toyama Thunderbirds.

Niigata Albirex won the 2012 BC League championship. Former Nippon Professional Baseball (NPB) player Itsuki Shoda pitched for the team in 2011. Former NPB and Major League Baseball reliever Shingo Takatsu played for the team in 2011–2012, and was the player-manager in 2012.

On 26 October 2023, the club entered into a naming-rights agreement with Oisix La Daichi, a mail-order food company, and became the Oisix Niigata Albirex Baseball Club. On 22 November 2023, it was announced that the team would join the Eastern League, one of the two NPB minor leagues, starting in 2024.

The team finished its first season in the Eastern League in last position with a 41–79–6 record. Despite this, Albirex performed well in home games, with 33 wins, 28 losses and 3 draws. Additionally, pitcher Tomoki Uemura led the league in saves and Taisei Chinen won the title as leading batter.

== Roster ==
Oisix Niigata Albirex roster
Active roster		Coaches
Pitchers: 11 (Japan) Tomoki Uemura; 14 (Japan) Takuto Takada; 15 (Japan) Riku Nishimura; 17 (Japan) Satoshi Miyamori; 20 (Japan) Kazutomo Iguchi; 26 (Japan) Taiga Yamada; 28 (Japan) Ryota Imai; 29 (Japan) Shu Namba; 31 (Japan) Jui Kobayashi; 34 (Japan) Kaito Irei; 41 (Japan) Hayato Suzuki; 43 (Japan) Kenta Ajiro; 45 (Japan) Yu Takano; 46 (Japan) Shunga Takahashi; 47 (Japan) Shōtarō Kasahara; 48 (Japan) Kazuma Yamashita	Catchers: 12 (Japan) Sora Yamada; 35 (Japan) Hideaki Nakazawa; Infielders: 0 (Japan) Yoshihiro Taka; 3 (Japan) Shunta Tanaka; 7 (Japan) Keita Sonobe; 25 (Japan) Keiji Konishi; 33 (Japan) Tamon Banzai; 52 (Japan) Kazuhiro Kishikawa; Outfielders: 1 (Taiwan) Yang Dai-Kang; 4 (Japan) Genta Urushihara; 5 (Japan) Yodai Ōkawa; 8 (Japan) Ryuhei Matsuyama; 9 (Japan) Shun Takayama; 24 (Japan) Hiroki Uehara; 36 (United States) Daniel Frey; 37 (Japan) Shōta Nakayama; 42 (United States) Adam Walker; 44 (Japan) Tenyu Higa; 55 (Japan) Reo Asai	Manager: 38 (Japan) Masaru Takeda; Coaches: 73 (Japan) Hiroki Inaba (fielding); 76 (Japan) Hayata Ito (head coach); 71 (Japan) Keisuke Kobayashi (pitching); 77 (Japan) Hidemitsu Saitō (fielding); Roster updated on 26 December 2025

== See also ==
- Niigata Prefectural Baseball Stadium (ballpark)
- Albirex Niigata
- Albirex Niigata (Singapore)
- Niigata Albirex BB
