= Chiaki Tone =

Japanese baseball player

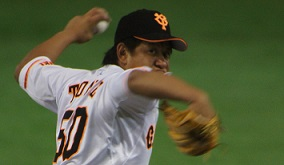
- Tone with the Yomiuri Giants
- Pitcher
- Born: October 17, 1992 (age 33); Tsuzuki District, Kyoto, Japan
- Batted: Left Threw: Left

NPB debut
- March 28, 2015, for the Yomiuri Giants

Last NPB appearance
- August 10, 2023, for the Hiroshima Toyo Carp

NPB statistics
- Win–loss record: 6–2
- Earned run average: 4.04
- Strikeouts: 152
- Saves: 3
- Stats at Baseball Reference

Teams
- Yomiuri Giants (2015–2022); Hiroshima Toyo Carp (2023–2024)

Chiaki Tone (戸根 千明, Tone Chiaki; born October 17, 1992 in Tsuzuki, Kyoto, Japan) is a professional Japanese baseball player. He plays pitcher for the Hiroshima Toyo Carp.

On November 16, 2018, he was selected Yomiuri Giants roster at the 2018 MLB Japan All-Star Series exhibition game against MLB All-Stars.

Tone has a Japanese father and a Filipino mother.
