= Ryūi Itō =

Japanese baseball player (born 2002)

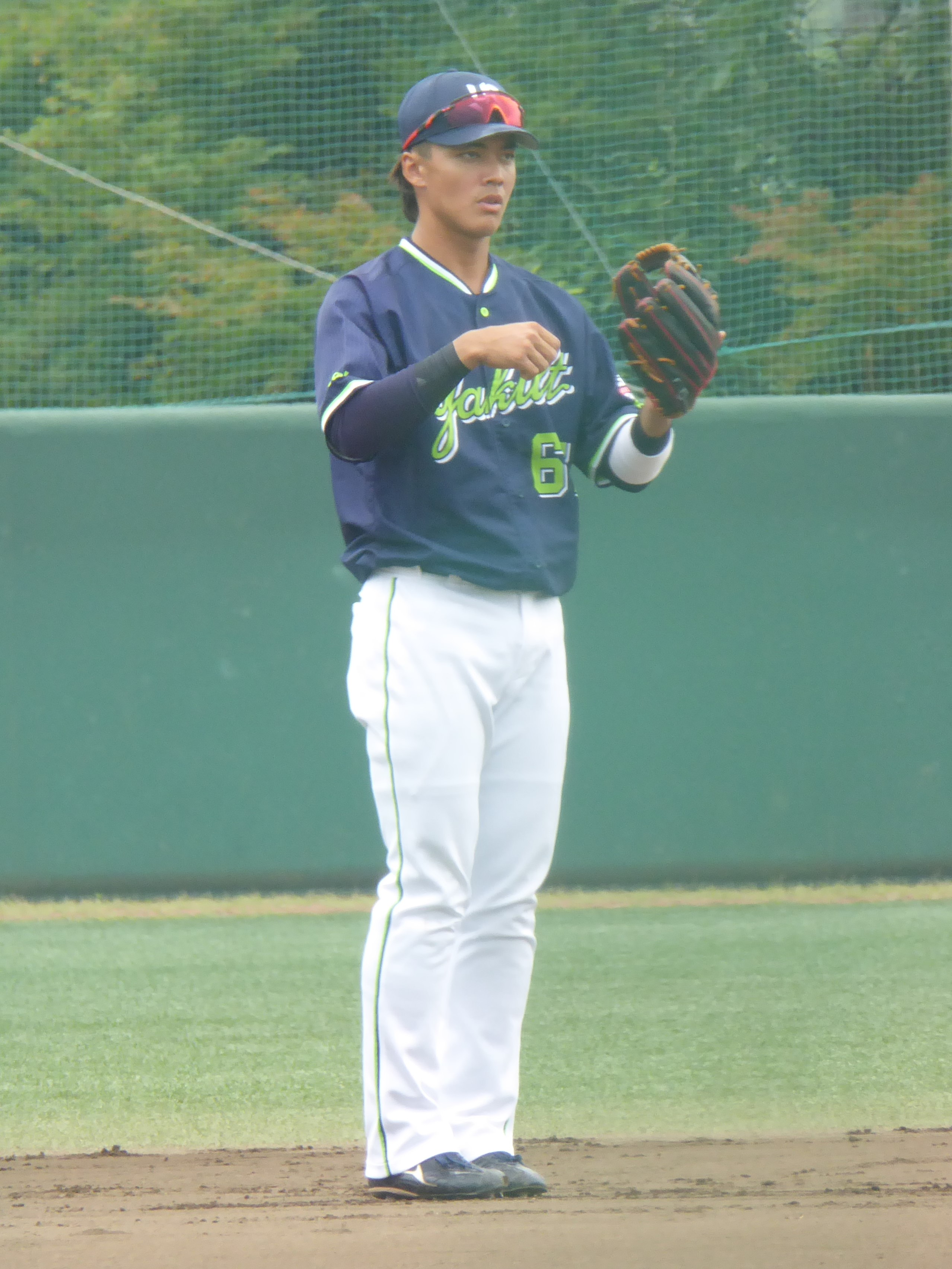

Tokyo Yakult Swallows – No. 67
- Infielder
- Born: September 11, 2002 (age 23); Takasaki, Gunma, Japan
- Bats: Right Throws: Right

NPB debut
- May 11, 2024, for the Tokyo Yakult Swallows

Career statistics (through 2025 season)
- Batting average: .205
- Hits: 38
- Home runs: 3
- RBI: 17

Teams
- Tokyo Yakult Swallows (2024–present)

Ryūi Itō (伊藤 琉偉, Itō Ryūi; born September 11, 2002) is a Japanese professional baseball infielder for the Tokyo Yakult Swallows of Nippon Professional Baseball (NPB).
