= Keisuke Izumi =

Japanese baseball player (born 1997)

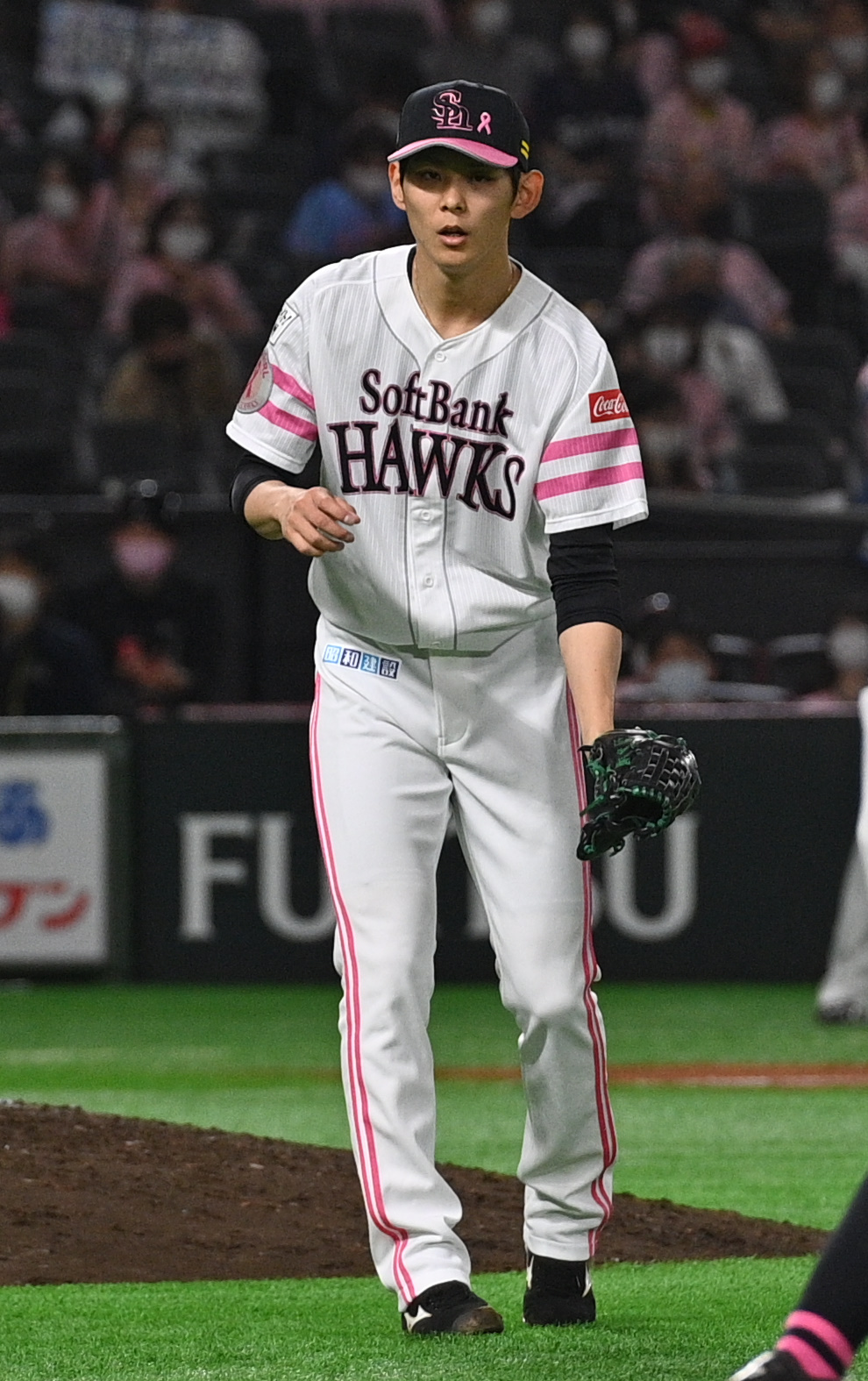
- Izumi with the Fukuoka SoftBank Hawks

Yomiuri Giants – No. 63
- Pitcher
- Born: March 2, 1997 (age 29); Kanazawa, Ishikawa, Japan
- Bats: Right Throws: Right

NPB debut
- April 16, 2019, for the Fukuoka SoftBank Hawks

NPB statistics (through 2023 season)
- Win–loss record: 3-5
- ERA: 3.00
- Holds: 23
- Saves: 0
- Strikeouts: 103
- Stats at Baseball Reference

Teams
- Fukuoka SoftBank Hawks (2019–2023); Yomiuri Giants (2024–present)

Career highlights and awards
- Japan Series champion (2020)

Keisuke Izumi (泉 圭輔, Izumi Keisuke; born March 2, 1997) is a Japanese professional baseball pitcher for the Yomiuri Giants of Nippon Professional Baseball. He has previously played in NPB for the Fukuoka SoftBank Hawks.

== Professional career ==
=== Fukuoka SoftBank Hawks ===
On October 25, 2018, Izumi was drafted by the Fukuoka Softbank Hawks in the 2018 Nippon Professional Baseball draft.

On April 16, 2019, Izumi debuted in the Pacific League against the Chiba Lotte Marines as a relief pitcher. And in the match against the Orix Buffaloes on April 22, he pitched as a relief pitcher and became his first Winning pitcher. In 2019 season, Izumi recorded with a 14 Games pitched, a 2–0 Win–loss record, a 1.96 ERA, a 3 Holds, a 18 strikeouts in 18.1 innings.

During the 2020 season, Izumi recorded 40 games pitched, a 0–1 win–loss record, a 2.08 ERA, an 8 Hold, and 28 strikeouts in 34.2 innings. In the 2020 Japan Series against the Yomiuri Giants, he was selected for the Japan Series roster.

In 2021 season, Izumi had a 16-game scoreless streak from the start of the season, but slowly lost his form and lost his chance to pitch in June. He finished the season with a record of 31 games pitched, a 0–2 Win–loss record, a 2.73 ERA, a 6 Holds, and a 30 strikeouts in 26.1 innings.

In 2022 season, he finished the regular season with a 30 Games pitched, a 0–2 Win–loss record, a 3.73 ERA, a 6 Holds, and a 25 strikeouts in 29 innings.

In 2023 season, Izumi only pitched in three games in the first league.

=== Yomiuri Giants ===
On November 6, 2023, Izumi and Rei Takahashi were traded to the Yomiuri Giants in exchange for Adam Brett Walker.
