= Soichiro Tateoka =

Japanese baseball player (born 1990)

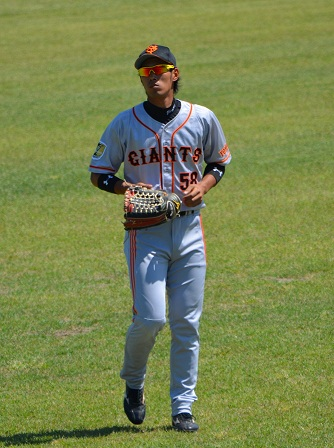
- Tateoka with the Yomiuri Giants

Yomiuri Giants – No. 107
- Outfielder / Coach
- Born: May 18, 1990 (age 36); Kumamoto Prefecture, Japan
- Batted: Right Threw: Right

NPB debut
- August 15, 2010, for the Fukuoka SoftBank Hawks

Last NPB appearance
- September 14, 2024, for the Yomiuri Giants

NPB statistics
- Batting average: .245
- Hits: 262
- Home runs: 4
- RBI: 62
- Stolen Bases: 44
- Stats at Baseball Reference

Teams
- As player: Fukuoka SoftBank Hawks (2010); Yomiuri Giants (2013–2024); As coach: Yomiuri Giants (2025–)

Soichiro Tateoka (立岡 宗一郎, born May 18, 1990) is a Japanese former professional baseball outfielder. He played in Nippon Professional Baseball (NPB) from 2010 to 2024 for the Fukuoka SoftBank Hawks and Yomiuri Giants.

== Career ==
On November 16, 2018, Tateoka was selected to the Yomiuri Giants's roster at the 2018 MLB Japan All-Star Series exhibition game against Major League Baseball all-stars.

Tateoka played in 48 games for Yomiuri in 2024, slashing .214/.305/.214 with no home runs, eight RBI, and three stolen bases. On October 27, 2024, Tateoka announced his retirement from professional baseball.
