= Shunta Tanaka =

Shunta Tanaka may refer to:

- Shunta Tanaka (baseball) (田中 俊太, born 1993), Japanese baseball player
- Shunta Tanaka (footballer) (田中 駿汰, born 1997), Japanese footballer
