= Yuhei Takanashi =

Japanese baseball player (born 1992)

Yūhei Takanashi
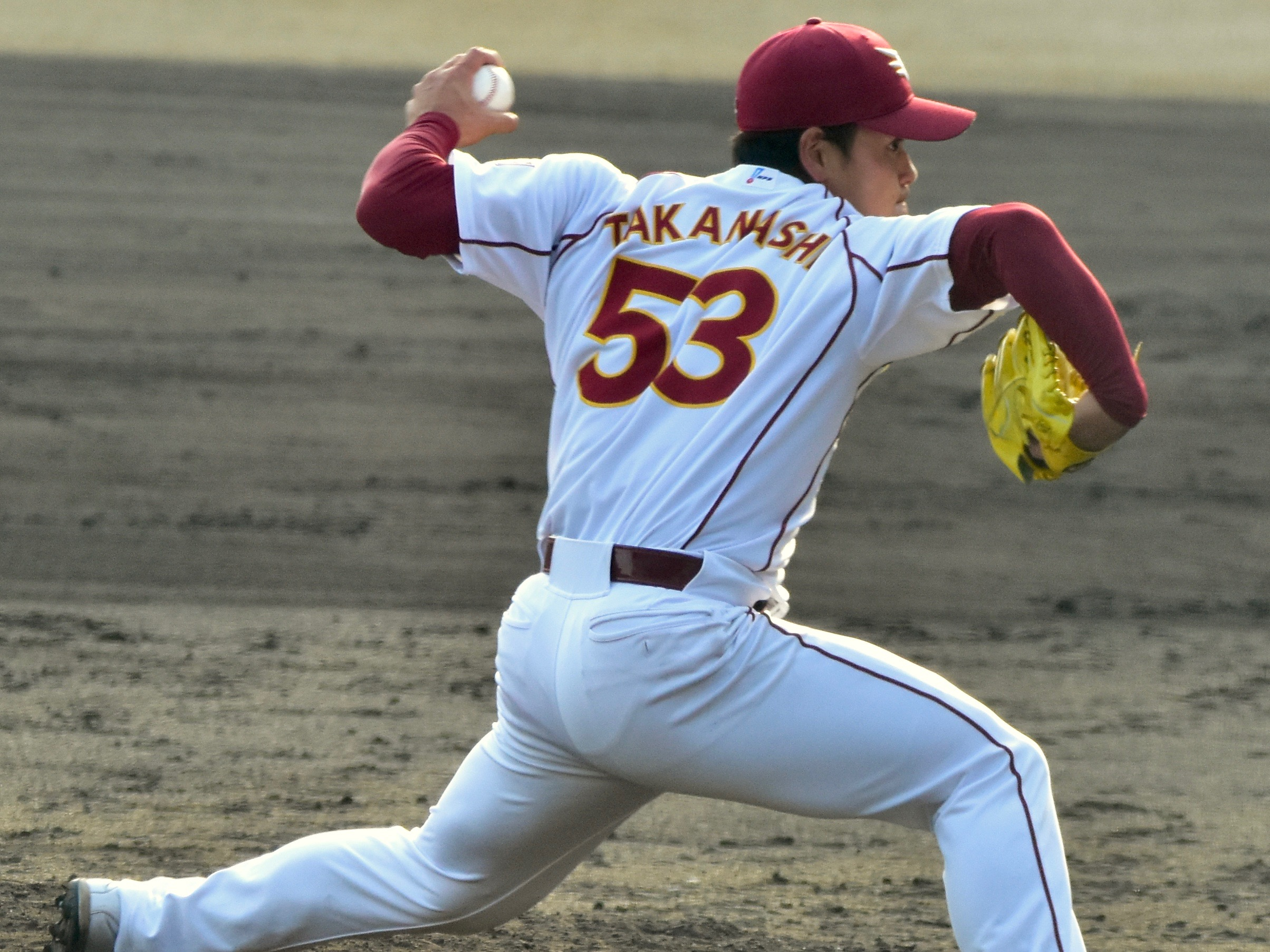

Yomiuri Giants – No. 53
- pitcher
- Born: July 13, 1992 (age 33); Kawagoe, Saitama, Japan
- Bats: Left Throws: Left

debut
- April 2, 2017, for the Tohoku Rakuten Golden Eagles

NPB statistics (through 2024 season)
- Win–loss record: 15-12
- Earned run average: 2.47
- Strikeouts: 348
- Saves: 4
- Holds: 158
- Stats at Baseball Reference

Teams
- Tohoku Rakuten Golden Eagles (2017–2020); Yomiuri Giants (2020–present)

Career highlights and awards
- NPB All-Star (2021)

Yūhei Takanashi (高梨 雄平, Takanashi Yūhei; born July 13, 1992 in Kawagoe, Saitama, Japan) is a professional Japanese baseball player. He plays pitcher for the Yomiuri Giants of Nippon Professional Baseball (NPB).

On October 10, 2018, he was selected for the Japan national baseball team to play at the 2018 MLB Japan All-Star Series.
