= Ayatsugu Yamashita =

Japanese baseball player (born 1992)

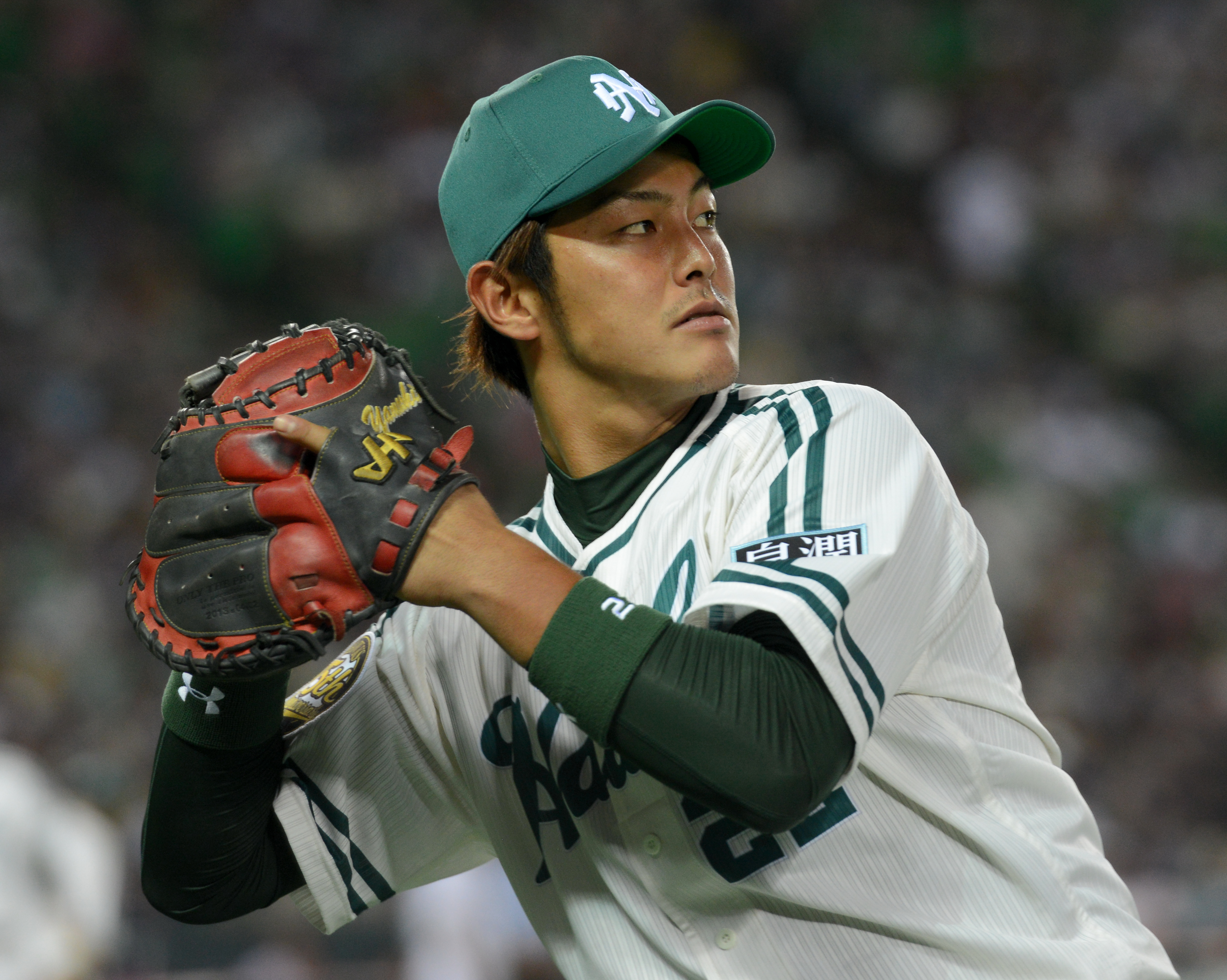
- Yamashita with the Fukuoka SoftBank Hawks
- Catcher
- Born: November 16, 1992 (age 33); Sapporo, Hokkaido, Japan
- Batted: Left Threw: Right

NPB debut
- May 6, 2013, for the Fukuoka SoftBank Hawks

Last NPB appearance
- July 20, 2022, for the Chunichi Dragons

NPB statistics
- Batting average: .189
- Hits: 46
- Home runs: 6
- RBIs: 16
- Stolen bases: 0
- Stats at Baseball Reference

Teams
- Fukuoka SoftBank Hawks (2011–2017); Tohoku Rakuten Golden Eagles (2018–2020); Chunichi Dragons (2021-2022)

Ayatsugu Yamashita (山下 斐紹, Yamashita Ayatsugu; born November 16, 1992) is a Japanese professional baseball catcher. He has played in Nippon Professional Baseball (NPB) for the Fukuoka SoftBank Hawks and Tohoku Rakuten Golden Eagles and Chunichi Dragons.

== Career ==
=== Fukuoka SoftBank Hawks ===
Fukuoka SoftBank Hawks selected Yamashita with the first selection in the 2010 NPB draft.

On May 6, 2013, Yamashita made his NPB debut.

=== Tohoku Rakuten Golden Eagles ===
On November 14, 2017, Hawks traded Yamashita to the Tohoku Rakuten Golden Eagles for Tetsuro Nishida.

On December 2, 2020, he became a free agent.

=== Chunichi Dragons ===
On December 12, 2020, Yamashita signed with Chunichi Dragons of NPB. December 18, 2020, Yamashita held press conference.
