= Tsubasa Aizawa =

Japanese baseball player (born 1988)

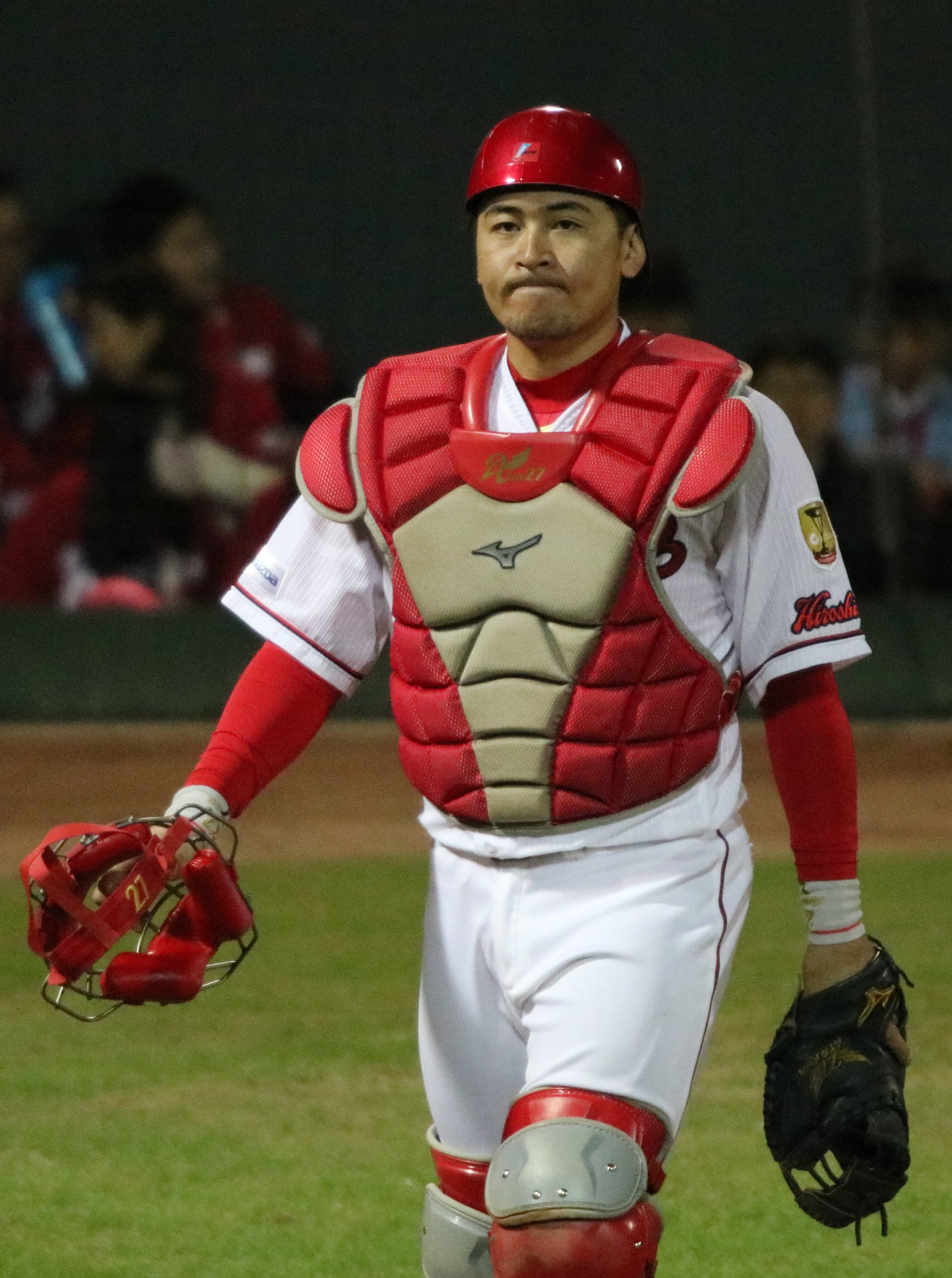
- Aizawa with the Hiroshima Toyo Carp

Hiroshima Toyo Carp – No. 27
- Catcher
- Born: April 13, 1988 (age 38); Hitachi, Ibaraki, Japan
- Bats: Right Throws: Right

NPB debut
- May 27, 2009, for the Hiroshima Toyo Carp

Career statistics (through 2022 season)
- Batting average: .257
- Hits: 655
- Home runs: 71
- Runs batted in: 332
- Stolen bases: 5
- Stats at Baseball Reference

Teams
- Hiroshima Toyo Carp (2007–present)

Career highlights and awards
- 3× NPB All-Star (2015, 2018, 2019); NPB All-Star Game MVP (2015 Game 2)
Medals
Men's baseball
Representing Japan
WBSC Premier12
Gold medal – first place	2019 Tokyo	Team

Tsubasa Aizawa (會澤 翼, Aizawa Tsubasa; born April 13, 1988 in Hitachi, Ibaraki, Japan) is a Japanese professional baseball catcher for the Hiroshima Toyo Carp.

He was selected 2018 NPB All-Star game.

== International career ==
Yamada represented the Japan national baseball team in the 2010 Intercontinental Cup, 2015 exhibition games against Europe, 2018 MLB Japan All-Star Series and 2019 WBSC Premier12.

On October 10, 2018, he was selected at the 2018 MLB Japan All-Star Series.

On October 1, 2019, he was selected at the 2019 WBSC Premier12.
