= Seiya Hosokawa =

Japanese baseball player (born 1998)

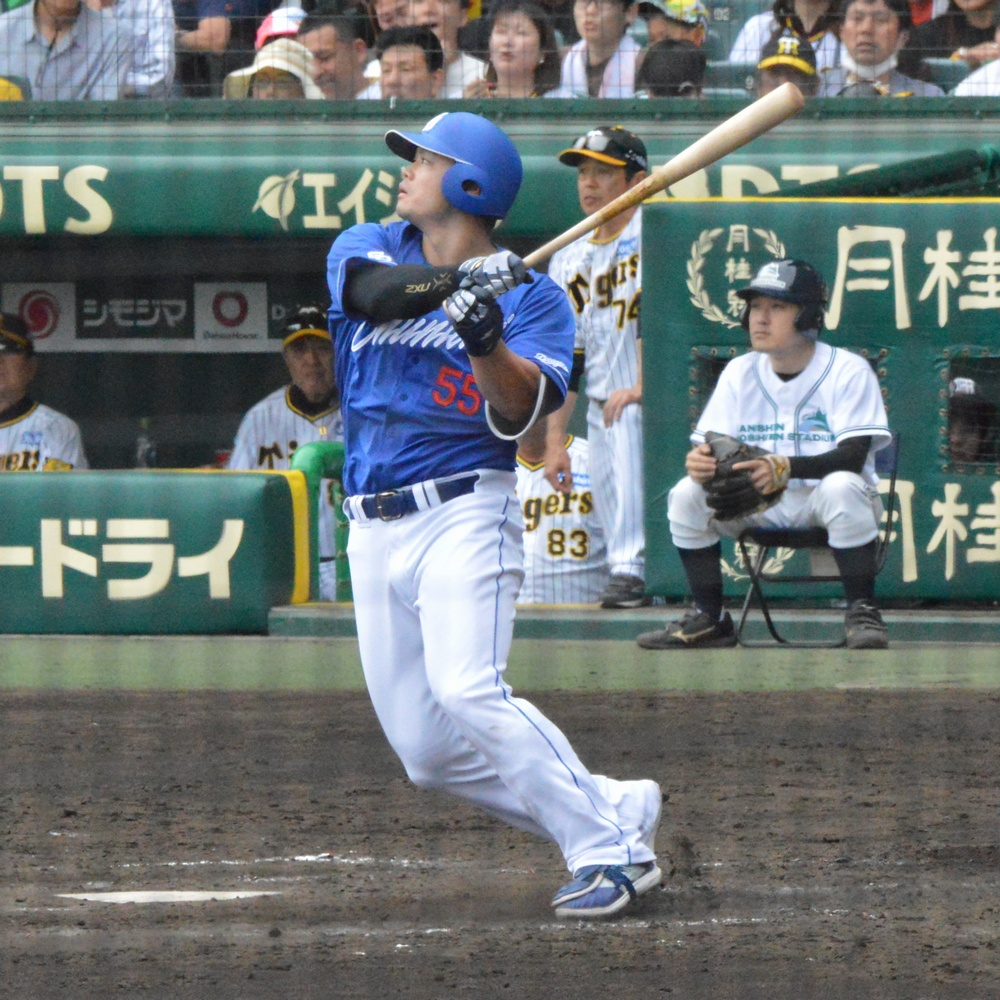
- Hosokawa with the Chunichi Dragons

Chunichi Dragons – No. 55
- Outfielder
- Born: August 4, 1998 (age 28); Atsugi, Kanagawa, Japan
- Bats: Right Throws: Right

NPB debut
- October 5, 2017, for the Yokohama DeNA BayStars

Career statistics (through July 26, 2026)
- Batting average: .254
- Home runs: 88
- Runs batted in: 269
- Stats at Baseball Reference

Teams
- Yokohama DeNA BayStars (2017–2022); Chunichi Dragons (2023–present)

Career highlights and awards
- 2× NPB All-Star (2023–2024); 1× Central League Best Nine Award (2024)

Seiya Hosokawa (細川 成也, Hosokawa Seiya; born August 4, 1998) is a Japanese professional baseball outfielder for the Chunichi Dragons of Nippon Professional Baseball (NPB). He has previously played in NPB for the Yokohama DeNA BayStars.

== Career ==
On 9 December 2022, Hosokawa was traded to the Chunichi Dragons for Shōtarō Kasahara in the 2022 Current Player Draft.
