= Shinnosuke Shigenobu =

Japanese baseball player (born 1993)

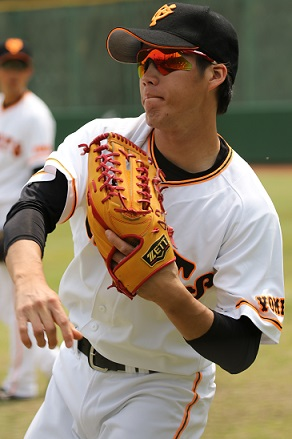
- Shigenobu with the Yomiuri Giants
- Outfielder
- Born: April 17, 1993 (age 33); Sakura, Chiba, Japan
- Batted: Left Threw: Right

NPB debut
- March 26, 2016, for the Yomiuri Giants

Last NPB appearance
- May 30, 2025, for the Yomiuri Giants

NPB statistics
- Batting average: .230
- Hits: 189
- Home runs: 7
- RBI: 55
- Stolen Bases: 70
- Stats at Baseball Reference

Teams
- Yomiuri Giants (2016–2025)

Shinnosuke Shigenobu (重信 慎之介, Shigenobu Shinnosuke; born August 18, 1993) is a Japanese professional baseball outfielder for the Yomiuri Giants in Japan's Nippon Professional Baseball.

On November 16, 2018, he was selected Yomiuri Giants roster at the 2018 MLB Japan All-Star Series exhibition game against MLB All-Stars.
