= Fighters Kamagaya Stadium =

Stadium in Kamagaya, Chiba, Japan

Coordinates: 35.760°N 139.978°E

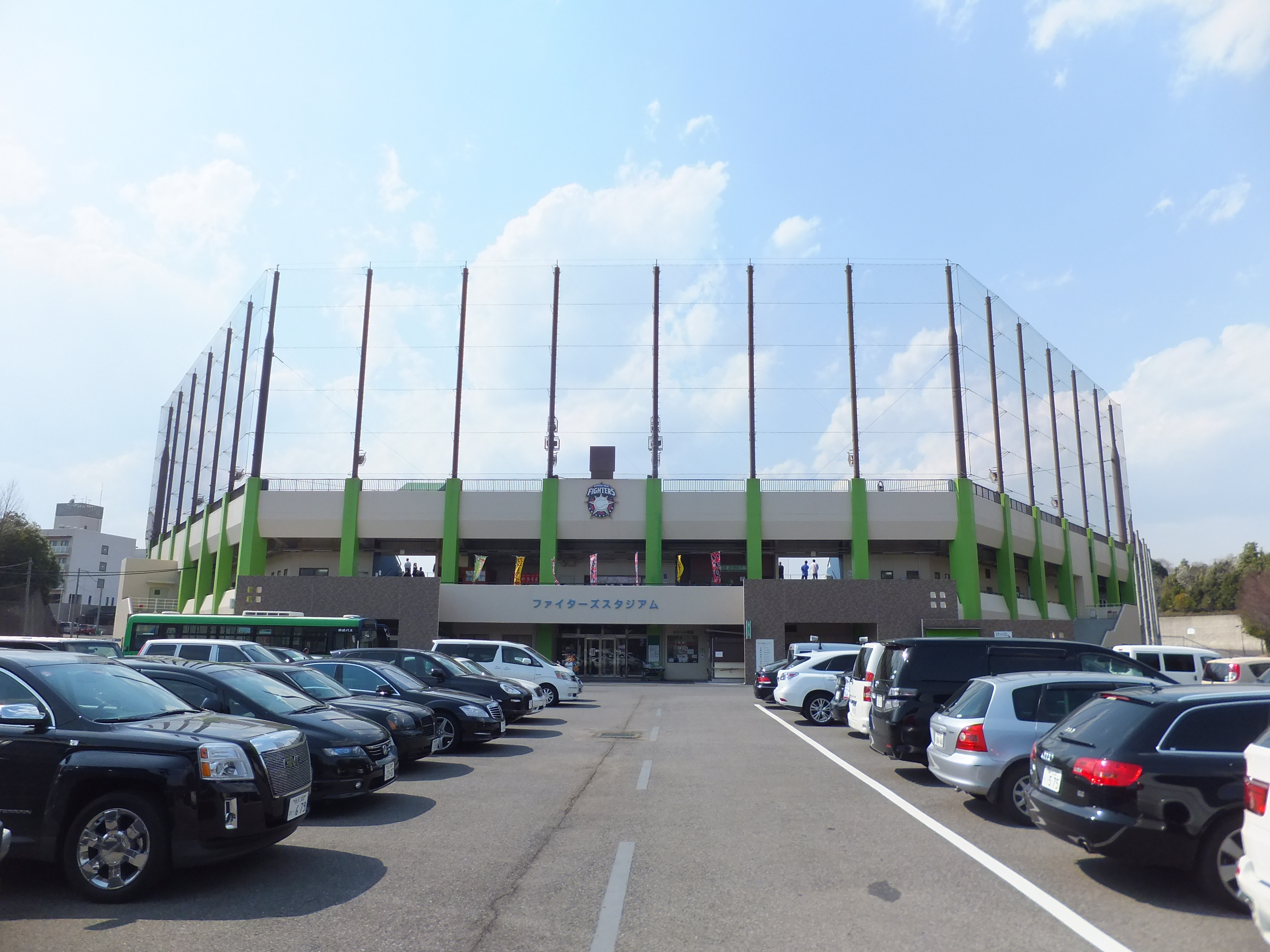
- Interactive map of Fighters Kamagaya Stadium
- Address: 459 Nakazawa, Kamagaya, Chiba Prefecture; Kamagaya
- Capacity: 2,400

Construction
- Opened: March 1997

Tenants
- Kamagaya Fighters (1997-present)

Website
- https://www.fighters.co.jp/stadium/kamagaya/

Fighters Kamagaya Stadium is a stadium located in Kamagaya, Chiba Prefecture, Japan, and is primarily used for baseball. It is home to the Kamagaya Fighters, the Eastern League farm squad of the Hokkaido Nippon-Ham Fighters of the NPB. The stadium is also used as a training facility for the Fighters.

== History ==
Fighters Kamagaya Stadium opened in March 1997 as a replacement for the Fighters farm stadium located near the Tama River. The stadium, due to its proximity near the river, had poor drainage, had deteriorated facilities, and no viewing facilities. Also, the stadium was near a bridge on the Tokyu Toyoko Line, so games had to be interrupted when a train passed by. The stadium construction only had a few issues, primarily with opposition with residents of Kawasaki. Despite this, construction began in October 1994. In 2013, the stadium's scoreboard got upgraded to a Daktronics and became the first full-vision scoreboard in a second army stadium in Japan.
