= Toshiya Satoh =

Japanese baseball player (born 1998)

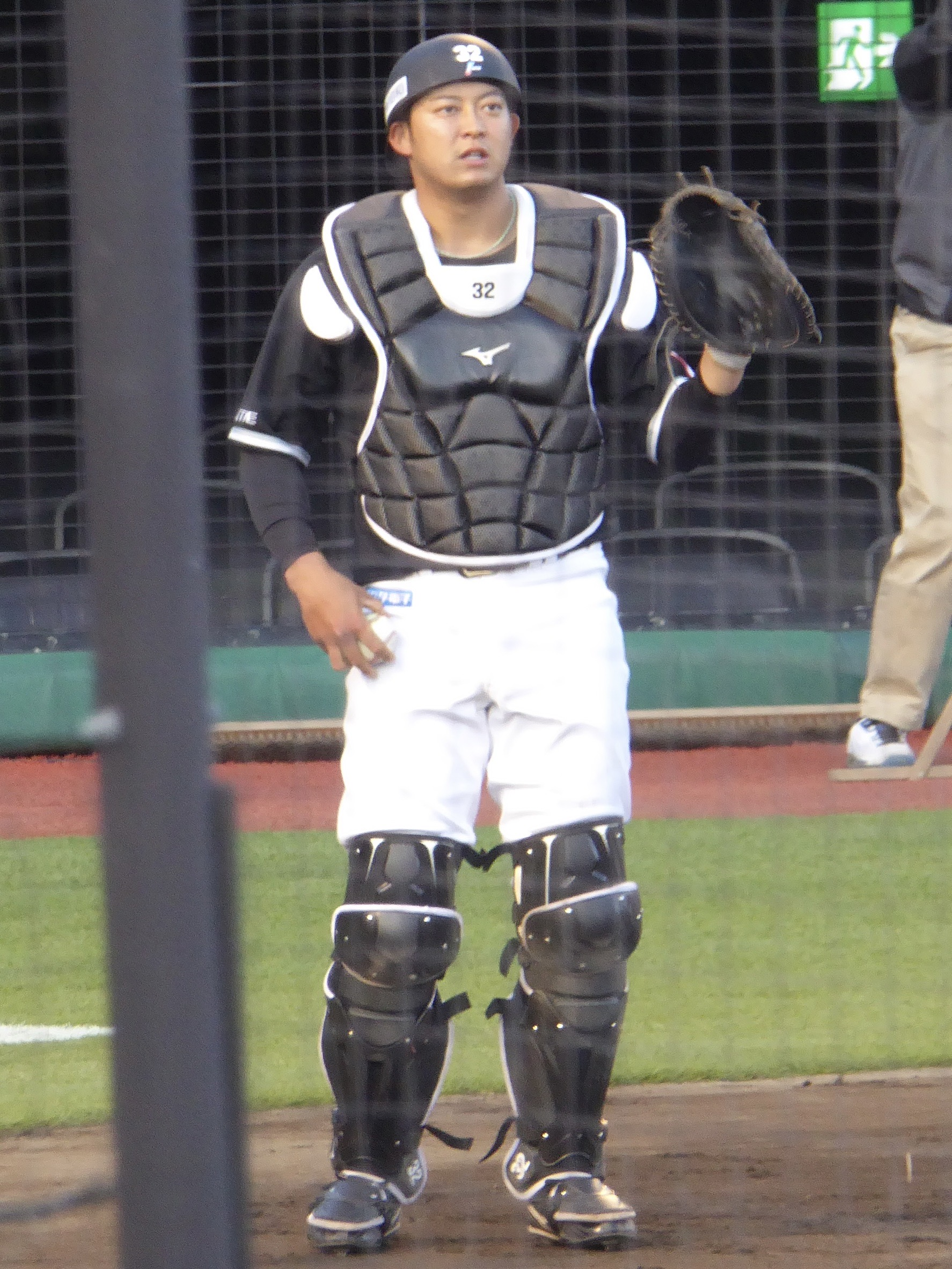
- Satoh with the Chiba Lotte Marines

Chiba Lotte Marines – No. 32
- Catcher
- Born: January 27, 1998 (age 28); Iwaki, Fukushima, Japan
- Bats: Right Throws: Right

NPB debut
- June 25, 2020, for the Chiba Lotte Marines

Career statistics (through 2024 season)
- Batting Average: .236
- Home Runs: 25
- RBI: 128
- Stats at Baseball Reference

Teams
- Chiba Lotte Marines (2020-present)

Career highlights and awards
- 1× NPB All-Star (2024); 1× Best Nine Award (2024)
Medals
Men's baseball
Representing Japan
WBSC Premier12
Silver medal – second place	2024	Team

Toshiya Satoh (佐藤 都志也, Satoh Toshiya; born January 27, 1998 in Iwaki, Fukushima, Japan) is a Japanese professional baseball catcher for the Chiba Lotte Marines of Nippon Professional Baseball (NPB).
