= 2018 MLB Japan All-Star Series =

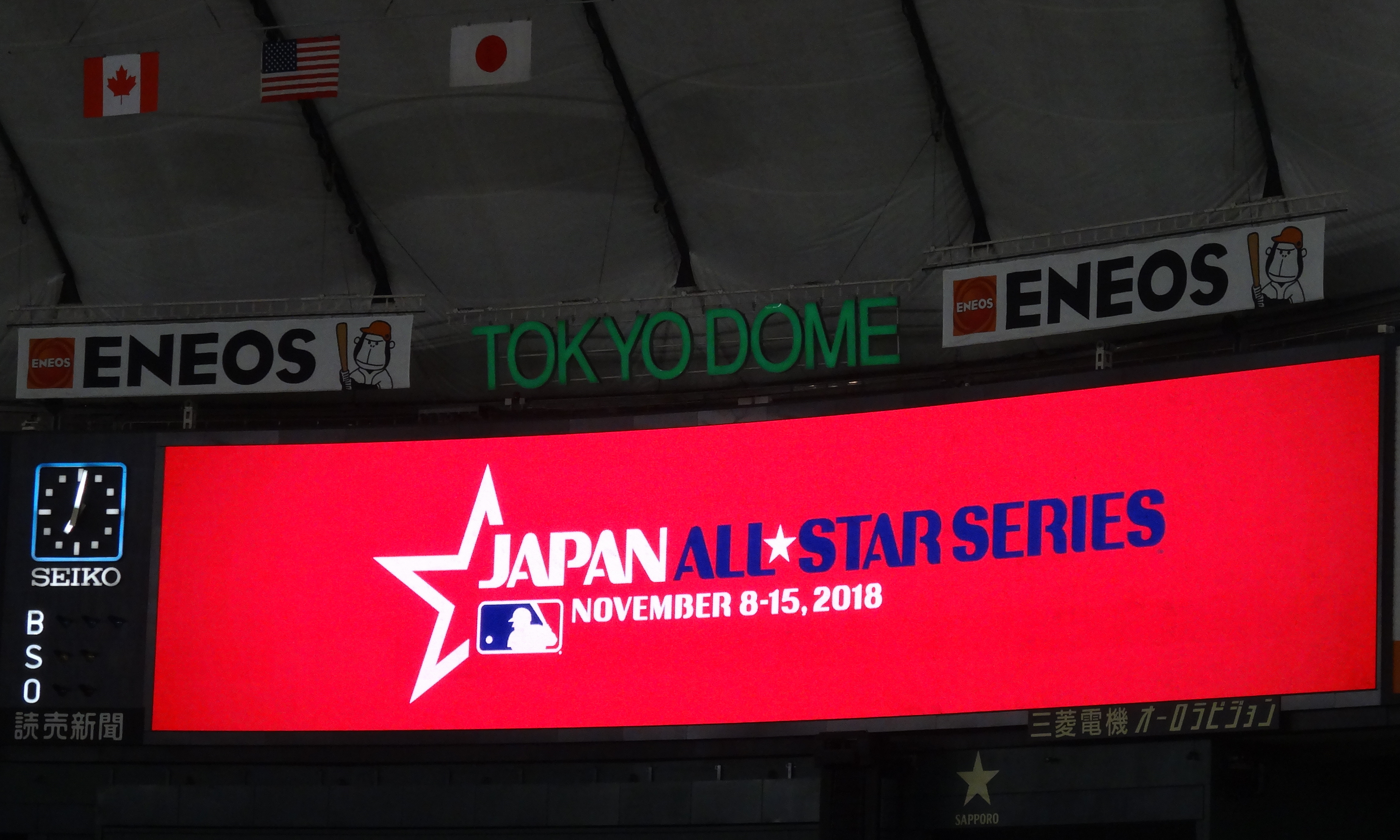
Team (Wins)	Managers
Samurai Japan (5)	Atsunori Inaba
MLB All-Stars (1)	Don Mattingly
- Dates: November 8–15, 2018
- Venues: Fukuoka Dome (Fukuoka); Mazda Zoom-Zoom Stadium Hiroshima (Hiroshima); Nagoya Dome (Nagoya); Osaka Dome (Osaka); Tokyo Dome (Tokyo)

Broadcast
- Television: TV Asahi, Nippon Television, Fuji TV, TBS, BS-TBS (Japan); MLB Network (United States & Canada)

The 2018 MLB Japan All-Star Series was the twelfth edition of the MLB Japan All-Star Series, a best-of-six series between an All-Star team from Major League Baseball (MLB) and for the second time in series history, the Japanese national team, Samurai Japan won. The manager of Samurai Japan saw in this championship a big opportunity for Japan to gain momentum for the 2020 Olympics.

== History ==
On May 1, 2018, MLB announced that it would send an all-star team to tour Japan after the end of the current season, with six games scheduled against a select Nippon Professional Baseball squad from November 9 to 15.

On August 20, 2018, Samurai Japan announced one exhibition game against Chinese Taipei, five coaches and six selected players.

On September 10, 2018, Major League Baseball Players Association and MLB announced the first eight selected MLB players.

On October 9, Tomoyuki Sugano canceled his participation for Samurai Japan.

On October 10, Samurai Japan announced all selected 28 players.

On October 15, Chinese Taipei announced all selected 24 players.

On October 18, 2018, Katsuki Azuma canceled his participation for Samurai Japan.

On October 26, 2018, Taichi Ishiyama and Yoshitomo Tsutsugo canceled their participation for Samurai Japan.

On October 29, 2018, Christian Yelich canceled his participation for MLB, Roster rules changed 28 to 29, announced all selected MLB players, and Chen Chong-You and Jerry Wu canceled their participation for Chinese Taipei.

On November 1, 2018, Takahiro Matsunaga canceled his participation for Samurai Japan.

On November 2, 2018, Shuta Ishikawa canceled his participation for Samurai Japan, and Che-hsuan Lin canceled his participation for Chinese Taipei.

On November 5, 2018, Lai Hung-Cheng canceled his participation for Chinese Taipei.

On November 16, 2018, Yomiuri Giants announced all selected players.

For the first time, the MLB All-Star team stopped in Hawai'i en route to the Japan All-Star series. The 28 player team batted in two workout games in front of fans at Les Murakami Stadium on November 3 & 4, 2018.

== Results ==
Exhibition

Game	Date / Time (JST)	Home team	Score	Away team	Duration	Location	Ref
1	November 7	Samurai Japan	5–6	Chinese Taipei		Fukuoka Dome	
2	November 8 / 6pm	MLB All-Stars (United States) (Canada)	9–6	(Japan) Yomiuri Giants		Tokyo Dome	

Championship

Game	Date / Time (JST)	Home team	Score	Away team	Duration	Location	Ref
1	November 9 / 6pm	Samurai Japan	7–6	(United States) (Canada) MLB All-Stars	3:29	Tokyo Dome	
2	November 10 / 6.30pm	MLB All-Stars (United States) (Canada)	6–12	Samurai Japan	3:19	Tokyo Dome	
3	November 11 / 7pm	Samurai Japan	3–7	(United States) (Canada) MLB All-Stars	2:59	Tokyo Dome	
4	November 13 / 6.30pm	MLB All-Stars (United States) (Canada)	3–5	Samurai Japan	3:27	Mazda Zoom-Zoom Stadium Hiroshima	
5	November 14 / 7pm	Samurai Japan	6–5	(United States) (Canada) MLB All-Stars	3:13	Nagoya Dome	
6	November 15 / 6pm	Samurai Japan	4–1	(United States) (Canada) MLB All-Stars	3:07	Nagoya Dome	

== Rosters ==
MLB All-Stars roster
Active roster		Coaches/Other
Pitchers: 35 (United States) Matt Andriese (ARI); 58 (United States) Scott Barlow (KC); 60 (United States) John Brebbia (STL); 41 (Venezuela) Junior Guerra (MIL); 61 (United States) Brian Johnson (BOS); 18 (Japan) Kenta Maeda (LAD); 31 (United States) Chris Martin (TEX); 31 (United States) Collin McHugh (HOU); 44 (United States) Daniel Norris (DET); 38 (United States) Vidal Nuño (TB); 61 (United States) Dan Otero (CLE); 36 (Venezuela) Yusmeiro Petit (OAK); 31 (Nicaragua) Erasmo Ramírez (SEA); 76 (Mexico) Héctor Velázquez (BOS); 39 (United States) Kirby Yates (SD)	Catchers: 4 (Puerto Rico) Yadier Molina (STL); 14 (Venezuela) Robinson Chirinos (FA); 11 (United States) J. T. Realmuto (MIA); Infielders: 15 (United States) Whit Merrifield (KC); 41 (Dominican Republic) Carlos Santana (PHI); 7 (Venezuela) Eugenio Suárez (CIN); 3 (United States) Chris Taylor (LAD); 1 (Dominican Republic) Amed Rosario (NYM); Outfielders: 13 (Venezuela) Ronald Acuña Jr. (ATL); 17 (United States) Mitch Haniger (SEA); 14 (Puerto Rico) Enrique Hernández (LAD); 17 (United States) Rhys Hoskins (PHI); 11 (United States) Kevin Pillar (TOR); 22 (Dominican Republic) Juan Soto (WAS)	Manager: 8 (United States) Don Mattingly (MIA); Coaches: 35 (Venezuela) Henry Blanco (WAS); 33 (Cuba) Fredi González (MIA); 11 (Puerto Rico) Edgar Martínez (SEA); 55 (Japan) Hideki Matsui (NYY); 31 (Curaçao) Hensley Meulens (SF); 56 (United States) Brent Strom (HOU)

Samurai Japan roster
Active roster		Coaches/Other
Pitchers: 11 (Japan) Takayuki Kishi; 14 (Japan) Daichi Osera; 15 (Japan) Naoyuki Uwasawa; 16 (Japan) Nao Higashihama; 17 (Japan) Akitake Okada; 18 (Japan) Shinsaburō Tawata; 19 (Japan) Yasuaki Yamasaki; 21 (Japan) Yuta Iwasada; 24 (Japan) Yuki Matsui; 25 (Japan) Yu Sato; 26 (Japan) Haruhiro Hamaguchi; 28 (Japan) Rei Takahashi; 41 (Japan) Kakeru Narita; 47 (Japan) Shotaro Kasahara; 53 (Japan) Yūhei Takanashi	Catchers: 10 (Japan) Tomoya Mori; 27 (Japan) Tsubasa Aizawa; 62 (Japan) Takuya Kai; Infielders: 1 (Japan) Tetsuto Yamada; 2 (Japan) Kosuke Tanaka; 4 (Japan) Ryosuke Kikuchi; 5 (Japan) Shuta Tonosaki; 6 (Japan) Sōsuke Genda; 8 (Japan) Kazuma Okamoto; 33 (Japan) Hotaka Yamakawa; Outfielders: 7 (Japan) Kazuki Tanaka; 22 (Japan) Yuki Yanagita; 51 (Japan) Seiji Uebayashi; 55 (Japan) Shogo Akiyama	Manager: 80 (Japan) Atsunori Inaba; Coaches: 87 (Japan) Masaji Shimizu; 84 (Japan) Yoshinori Murata; 82 (Japan) Hirokazu Ibata; 88 (Japan) Makoto Kaneko; 81 (Japan) Yoshinori Tateyama

Chinese Taipei roster
Active roster		Coaches/Other
Pitchers: 12 (Taiwan) Chen Yun-wen; 15 (Taiwan) Jyu Jyun-Shan; 16 (Taiwan) Jyan Chen-Yen; 17 (Taiwan) Lin Twu-Wei; 19 (Taiwan) Cheng Kai-wen; 21 (Taiwan) Yu-Hsun Chen; 37 (Taiwan) Chu Hao-Jyun; 45 (Taiwan) Si Tzu-Chen; 69 (Taiwan) Huang Tzu-Pong; 77 (Taiwan) Wu Cheng-Che	Catchers: 11 (Taiwan) Lin Hung-yu; 26 (Taiwan) Huang Jyung-Shong; 31 (Taiwan) Ling Young-Lang; Infielders: 5 (Taiwan) Kuo Fu-Lin; 7 (Taiwan) Kuo Yong-Wei; 9 (Taiwan) Oh Wei-Chung; 14 (Taiwan) Wang Seng-wei; 29 (Taiwan) Chen Chun-Hsiu; 36 (Taiwan) Yu Te-Lung; 51 (Taiwan) Yu Meng-Kui; 85 (Taiwan) Chu Yu-Hsien; Outfielders: 10 (Taiwan) Chen Zi-Hao; 24 (Taiwan) Chen Chieh-Hsien; 55 (Taiwan) Pan Wu-hsiung; 88 (Taiwan) Lang Ing-Lung	Manager: 53 (Taiwan) Huang Kan-lin; Coaches: 76 (Taiwan) Lin Ming-hsien; 75 (Taiwan) Chuan Chin-Her; 81 (Taiwan) Cheng Po-jen; 34 (Taiwan) Lin Cheng-feng; 22 (Taiwan) Lau Ka-ho; 92 (Taiwan) Lau Yui-chun

Yomiuri Giants roster
Active roster		Coaches/Other
Pitchers: 29 (Japan) Takuya Kuwahara; 30 (Japan) Ryosuke Miyaguni; 35 (Japan) Toshiki Sakurai; 50 (Japan) Chiaki Tone; 53 (Japan) Hōsei Takata; 57 (Japan) Kyosuke Takagi; 64 (Japan) Ryusei Ohe; 90 (Japan) Kazuto Taguchi	Catchers: 22 (Japan) Seiji Kobayashi; 27 (Japan) Shingo Usami; 38 (Japan) Yukinori Kishida; 46 (Japan) Takumi Ohshiro; Infielders: 0 (Japan) Naoki Yoshikawa; 6 (Japan) Hayato Sakamoto; 10 (Japan) Shinnosuke Abe; 52 (Japan) Takumi Kitamura; 56 (Japan) Yasuhiro Yamamoto; 60 (Japan) Akihiro Wakabayashi; 63 (Japan) Shunta Tanaka; 68 (Japan) Daiki Yoshikawa; 98 (Japan) Daiki Masuda; Outfielders: 2 (Taiwan) Dai-Kang Yang; 7 (Japan) Hisayoshi Chōno; 9 (Japan) Yoshiyuki Kamei; 43 (Japan) Shinnosuke Shigenobu; 49 (Japan) Shingo Ishikawa; 58 (Japan) Soichiro Tateoka; 59 (Japan) Seiya Matsubara; 67 (Japan) Ren Wada	Manager: 83 (Japan) Tatsunori Hara; Coaches: 87 (Japan) Sadaaki Yoshimura; 81 (Japan) Kazutomo Miyamoto; 71 (Japan) Katsuhito Mizuno; 77 (Japan) Daisuke Motoki; 79 (Japan) Ryoji Aikawa; 91 (Japan) Ikuo Anafuki; 74 (Japan) Tatsuhiko Kinjō

== Live broadcasting ==
- TV Asahi, Nippon Television, Fuji TV, TBS, BS-TBS (Japan)
- MLB Network (US & Canada)
