= Hamaya (surname) =

Hamaya (written: 浜谷 or 濱谷) is a Japanese surname. Notable people with the surname include:

- Hiroshi Hamaya (濱谷 浩, 1915–1999), Japanese photographer
- Kimihiro Hamaya (浜谷 公宏, born 1963), Japanese speed skater
- Kodai Hamaya (濱矢 廣大, born 1993), Japanese baseball player
