= Hideki Nagaoka =

Japanese baseball player (born 2001)

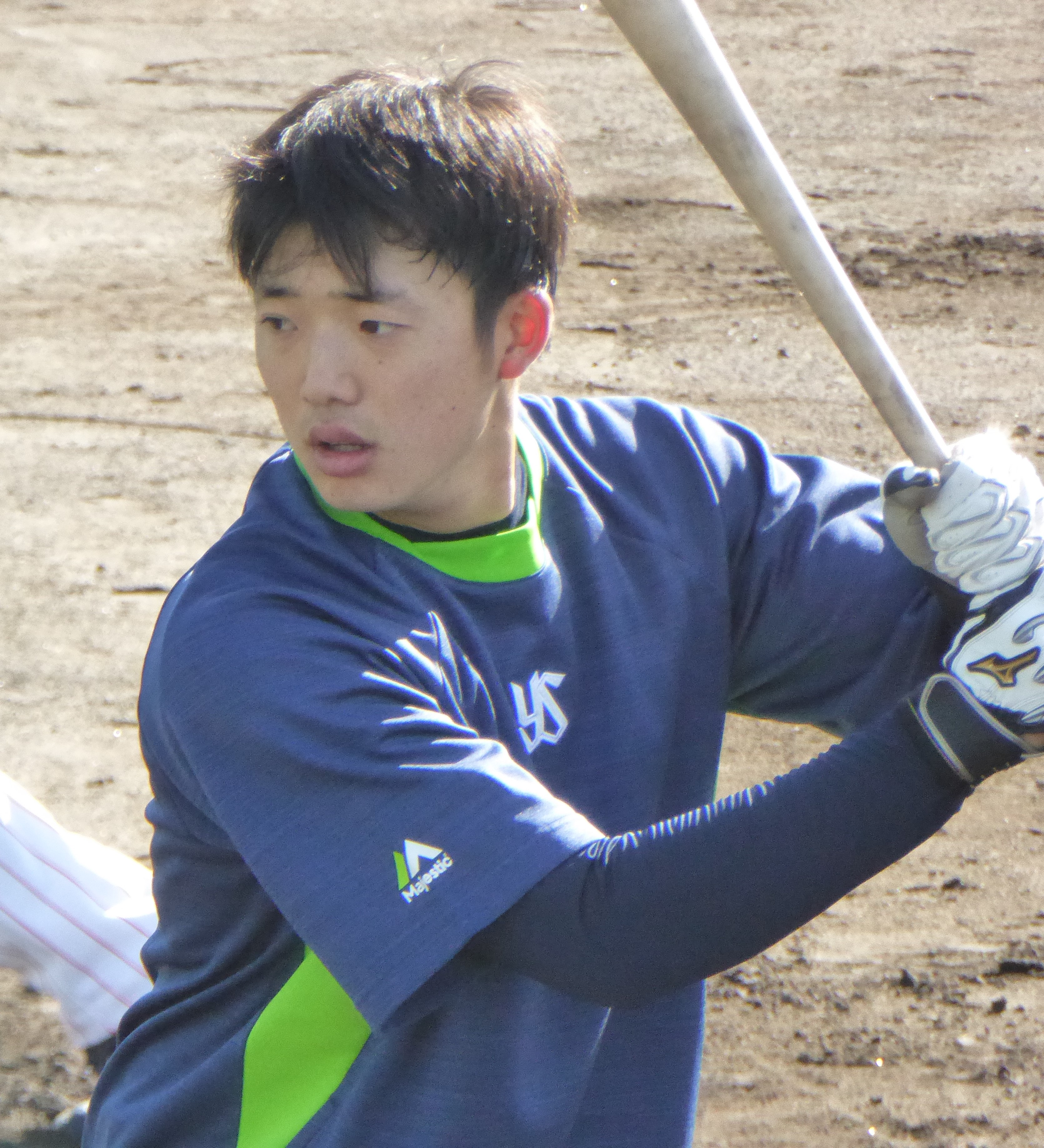
- Nagaoka with the Tokyo Yakult Swallows

Tokyo Yakult Swallows – No. 7
- Infielder
- Born: September 26, 2001 (age 23); Funabashi, Chiba, Japan
- Bats: Left Throws: Right

NPB debut
- October 23, 2020, for the Tokyo Yakult Swallows

Career statistics (through 2024 season)
- Batting average: .251
- Hits: 388
- Home runs: 18
- RBI: 141

Teams
- Tokyo Yakult Swallows (2020–present)

Career highlights and awards
- 3× NPB All-Star (2022–2024); 1× Mitsui Golden Glove Award (2022); 1× Best Nine Award (2024)

Hideki Nagaoka (長岡 秀樹, Nagaoka Hideki; born September 26, 2001) is a Japanese professional baseball infielder for the Tokyo Yakult Swallows of Nippon Professional Baseball (NPB).
