= Shōtarō Kasahara =

Japanese baseball player (born 1995)

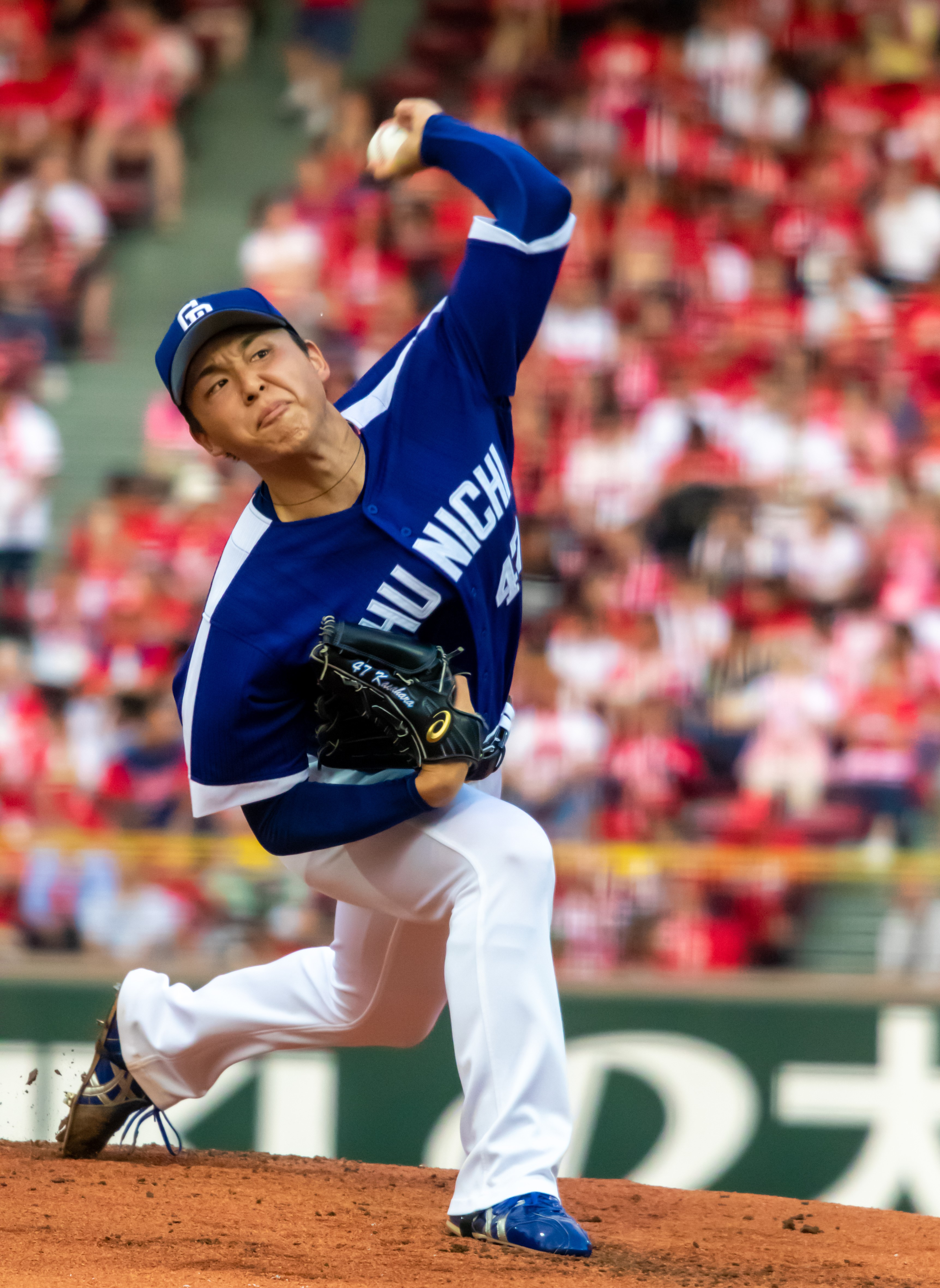
- Kasahara with the Chunichi Dragons

Oisix Niigata Albirex – No. 47
- Pitcher
- Born: March 17, 1995 (age 31); Niigata, Niigata, Japan
- Bats: Left Throws: Left

Professional debut
- NPB: 30 June, 2017, for the Chunichi Dragons
- CPBL: 5 April, 2024, for the TSG Hawks

NPB statistics (through 2023 season)
- Win–loss record: 11–15
- Earned run average: 4.44
- Strikeouts: 179

CPBL statistics (through 2024 season)
- Win–loss record: 1–1
- Earned run average: 3.18
- Strikeouts: 13
- Stats at Baseball Reference

Teams
- Chunichi Dragons (2017–2022); Yokohama DeNA BayStars (2023); TSG Hawks (2024)

Shōtarō Kasahara (笠原 祥太郎, Kasahara Shōtarō; born March 17, 1995) is a Japanese professional baseball pitcher for the Mid East Falcons of Baseball United. He has previously played in Nippon Professional Baseball (NPB) for the Yokohama DeNA BayStars and Chunichi Dragons and in the Chinese Professional Baseball League (CPBL) for the TSG Hawks.

== Career ==
=== Amateur career ===
Kashara was admitted to Niigata University of Health and Welfare without consideration for his baseball talent and was able to, over time, increase his velocity from throwing in the mid 130s (km/h) to throwing in the high 140s (km/h).In the 2016 university fall league, he achieved a 0.72 ERA, claimed the most wins title and was chosen in the Best 9.

=== Chunichi Dragons ===
Kasahara was the 4th pick for the Chunichi Dragons at the 2016 Nippon Professional Baseball draft.

=== Yokohama DeNA Baystars ===
On 9 December 2022, Kasahara was traded for Seiya Hosokawa in the 2022 Current Player Draft. He made only two starts for Yokohama in 2023, posting an 0–2 record and 4.50 ERA with five strikeouts in six innings of work.

=== TSG Hawks ===
On November 26, 2023, Kasahara signed with the TSG Hawks of the Chinese Professional Baseball League. In three starts for the Hawks, he compiled a 3.18 ERA with 13 strikeouts across 17 innings pitched. Kasahara was released by the Hawks on June 8, 2024.

=== Oisix Niigata Albirex ===
In July 2024, Kasahara signed with the Oisix Niigata Albirex of the Eastern League.

=== Mid East Falcons ===
In October 2025, Kasahara signed with the Mid East Falcons of Baseball United.

== International career ==
On October 10, 2018, he was selected Japan national baseball team at the 2018 MLB Japan All-Star Series.
