= Yokosuka Stadium =

Baseball stadium in Yokosuka, Kanagawa, Japan

Coordinates: 35°19′06″N 139°38′07″E

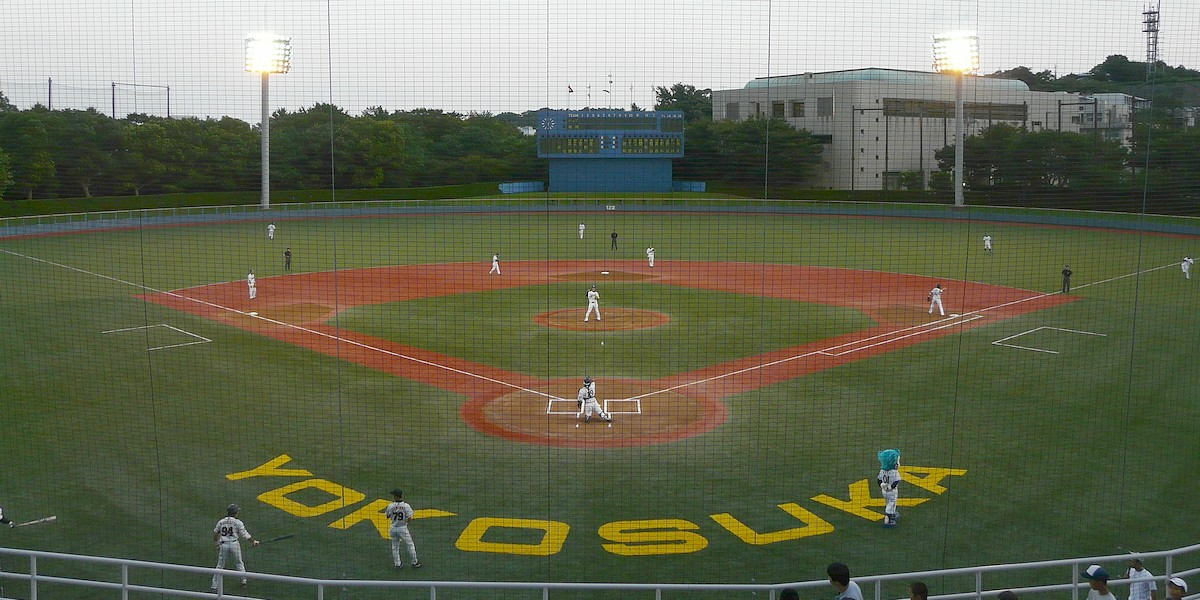
- Yokosuka Stadium
- Interactive map of Yokosuka Stadium
- Location: Yokosuka, Kanagawa, Japan
- Owner: Yokosuka City
- Capacity: 5,000
- Field size: Left Field – 98 m (322'); Center Field – 122 m (400'); Right Field – 98 m (322')

Construction
- Opened: 1949
- Renovated: 1997

Tenant
- Yokohama DeNA BayStars (Eastern League) (1997-Present)

Yokosuka Stadium is a baseball stadium in Japan, and the home ground of the Yokohama DeNA BayStars Eastern League affiliate. It was opened in 1949 as Oppama Park, and rebuilt in 1997.

Prior tenants of the stadium are Yokohama BayStars, Shonan Searex, and Yokohama BayStars.

== Transportation ==
- Approximately a 15-minute walk from Oppama Station, on the Keikyu Main Line
