= Niigata Prefectural Baseball Stadium =

Baseball stadium in Niigata, Japan

- Hard Off Eco Stadium Niigata
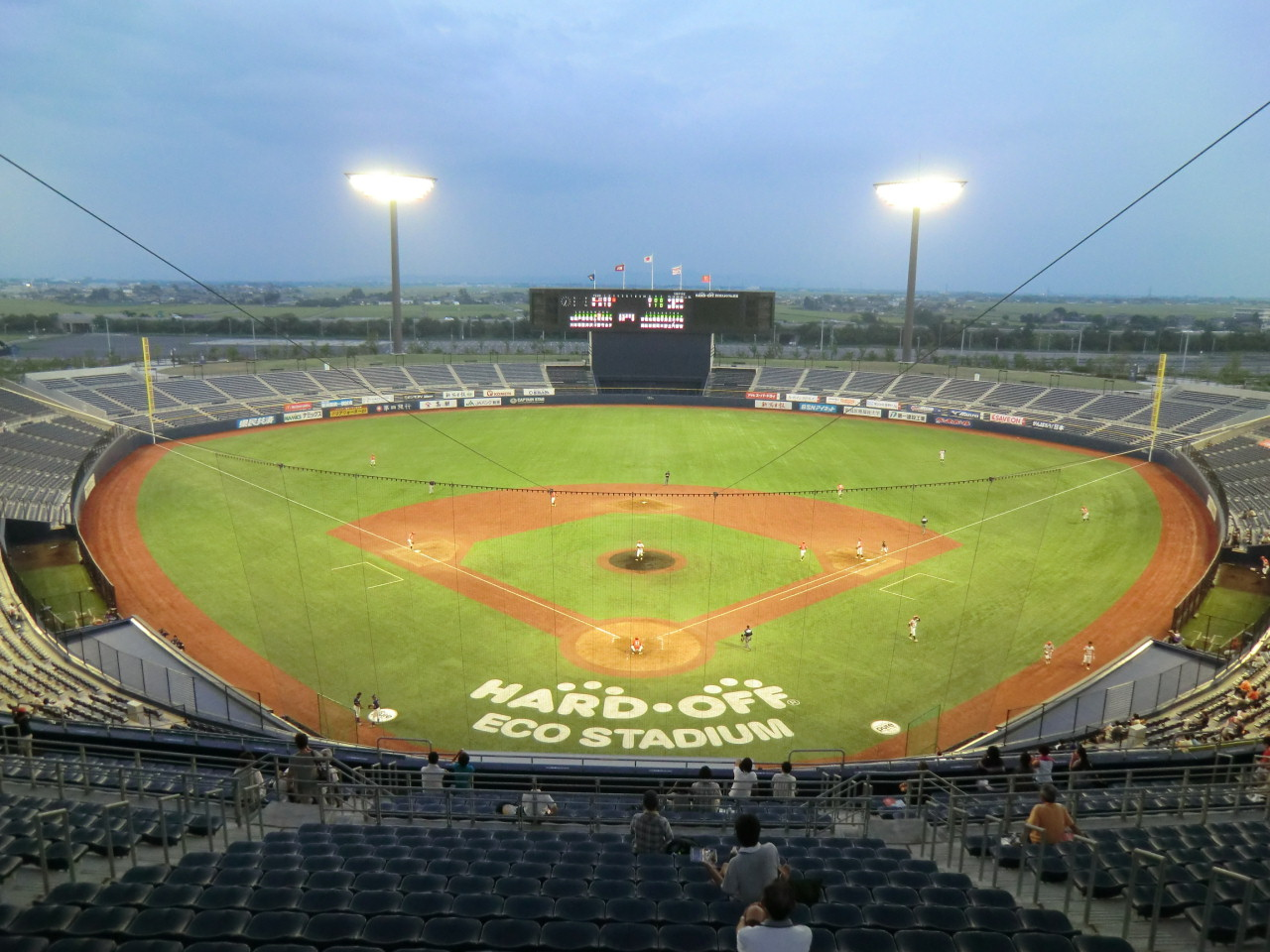
- Interactive map of Niigata Prefectural Baseball Stadium
- Location: Niigata, Niigata
- Coordinates: 37.879418°N 139.064266°E
- Owner: Niigata Prefecture
- Operator: Albirex Niigata
- Capacity: 30,000
- Field size: left: 100 m center: 122 m right: 100 m

Construction
- Built: January 24, 2007
- Opened: July 1, 2009

Tenant
- Niigata Albirex Baseball Club

Niigata Prefectural Baseball Stadium (新潟県立野球場), officially HARD OFF ECO Stadium Niigata, is a baseball stadium in Niigata, Niigata opened on July 1, 2009. It is primarily used for baseball and is the home of the Niigata Albirex Baseball Club. The stadium hosted one NPB All-Star Game in 2010.

== Access ==
Transit bus

There is a bus stop ' Sports Koen mae (スポーツ公園前)', 2 minutes walk away from the stadium. Transit bus operated by Niigata Kotsu S70, S71, S72 (line: S7) runs from Niigata Station South Exit.

== See also ==
- Denka Big Swan Stadium
