= Shunta Tanaka (baseball) =

Japanese baseball player (born 1993)

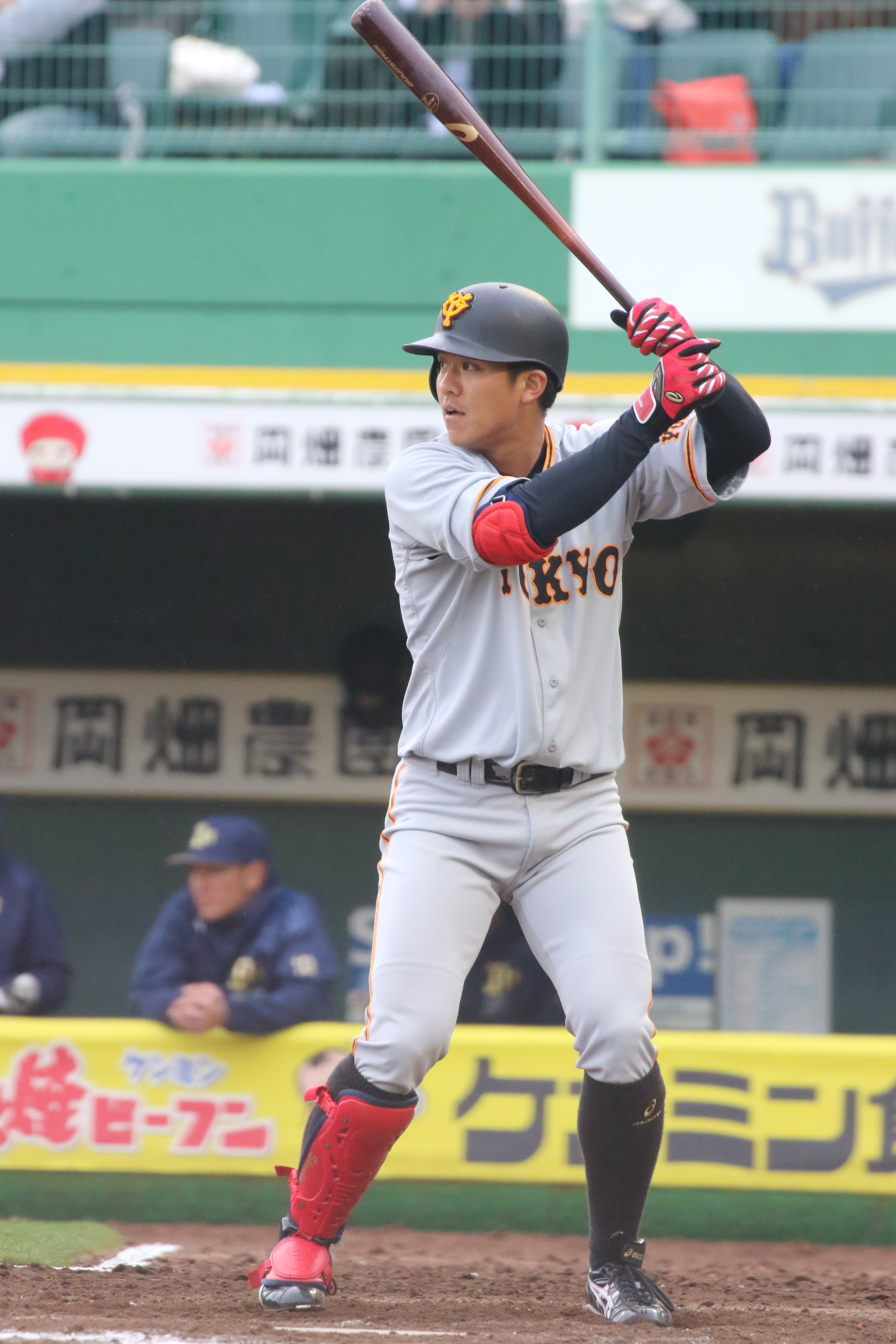
- Tanaka with the Yomiuri Giants

Oisix Niigata Albirex – No. 3
- Infielder
- Born: August 18, 1993 (age 33); Kanagawa, Kanagawa, Japan
- Bats: Left Throws: Right

NPB debut
- March 30, 2018, for the Yomiuri Giants

NPB statistics (through 2020 season)
- Batting average: .239
- Home runs: 7
- RBI: 32
- Stats at Baseball Reference

Teams
- Yomiuri Giants (2018–2020); Yokohama DeNA BayStars (2021–2023)

Shunta Tanaka (田中 俊太, Tanaka Shunta; born August 18, 1993) is a Japanese professional baseball infielder. He previous played for the Yomiuri Giants and the Yokohama DeNA BayStars in Nippon Professional Baseball (NPB).

On November 16, 2018, he was selected Yomiuri Giants roster at the 2018 MLB Japan All-Star Series exhibition game against MLB All-Stars.

His elder brother Kosuke is also a professional baseball player currently playing for Hiroshima Toyo Carp of Nippon Professional Baseball.
