= Eastern League (Japanese baseball) =

Japanese professional baseball league

- Sport: Baseball
- Founded: 1955
- Folded: 1956 (revived in 1961)
- No. of teams: 8
- Country: Japan

The Eastern League (イースタン・リーグ) is one of the two minor leagues ("ni-gun") of Japanese professional baseball. The league is owned and managed by the Central League of Nippon Professional Baseball (NPB). Teams in the Eastern League generally play an 80-game schedule every year.

== Current teams ==
The league currently contains the minor league affiliates of seven Japanese professional teams plus one independent team. With a few exceptions, Eastern League teams currently carry the same name, and use the same uniforms, as their parent team.

Team	City	Main stadium
Chiba Lotte Marines	Saitama, Saitama	Lotte Urawa Stadium
Hokkaido Nippon-Ham Fighters	Kamagaya, Chiba	Fighters Stadium
Saitama Seibu Lions (Note: The minor league team name depends on the sponsoring company; from 2004–2006 they were known as the Invoice Lions; in 2007 naming rights were acquired by Goodwill, but they reverted to the major league team name in 2008 because of Goodwill's illegal commercial activities.)	Tokorozawa, Saitama	Seibu No. 2 Stadium
Yokohama DeNA BayStars	Yokosuka, Kanagawa	Yokosuka Stadium
Tohoku Rakuten Golden Eagles	Sendai, Miyagi	Rakuten Eagles Izumi Practice Field
Tokyo Yakult Swallows	Toda, Saitama	Yakult Toda Stadium
Yomiuri Giants	Inagi, Tokyo	Yomiuri Giants Stadium
Oisix Niigata Albirex Baseball Club	Niigata, Niigata	Niigata Prefectural Baseball Stadium

== History ==
=== Shin Nippon League ===
In 1954 the six teams of NPB's Central League agreed to form their own minor league — the Shin Nippon League (or "New Japan League") — as a complement to the already extant Kansai Farm League, which had begun play in 1952. The minor league affiliates of the Chunichi Dragons and Hanshin Tigers moved over from the Kansai Farm League.

The initial roster of Shin Nippon League teams (NPB parent team in parentheses):

- Chunichi Diamonds (Chunichi Dragons)
- Hiroshima Greens (Hiroshima Carp)
- Kokutetsu Fresh Swallows (Kokutetsu Swallows)
- Osaka Jaguars (Osaka Tigers)
- Taiyō-Shochiku Junior Robins (Taiyō-Shochiku Robins)
- Yomiuri Junior Giants (Yomiuri Giants)

=== Formation of the Eastern League ===
Both minor leagues decided to join forces with Nippon Professional Baseball in 1955, and the 14 farm teams of the Central League and Pacific League were split up to create the Eastern League and the Western League, each with seven teams.

The Eastern League contained the minor league teams of the seven professional teams that had their homefields in the Eastern region of Japan (NPB parent team in parentheses):

- Daiei Junior Stars (Daiei Stars)
- Kokutetsu Fresh Swallows (Kokutetsu Swallows)
- Mainichi Little Orions (Mainichi Orions)
- Taiyo Junior Whales (Taiyo Whales)
- Toei Chick Flyers (Toei Flyers)
- Tombo Unions ni-gun (Tombo Unions)
- Yomiuri Junior Giants (Yomiuri Giants)

=== 1956-1960 hiatus ===
After one year of operation, the league dissolved in 1956 for financial reasons.

=== Rebirth ===
The Eastern League restarted in 1961 with five teams: in the interim the Daiei Stars and the Takahashi Unions (formerly the Tombo Unions) had merged into the Daiei Unions, who in turn merged with the Mainichi Orions to ultimately form the Daimai Orions (now known as the Chiba Lotte Marines). From that point until the year 2000, all Japanese minor league teams used the same name as their NPB parent club.

In 1979, the Nishitetsu Lions moved their franchise to Saitama, with their minor league team leaving the Western League to join the Eastern League.

In 2005 the Tohoku Rakuten Golden Eagles were formed to join NPB, and their farm team became part of the Eastern League as well.

The independent Niigata Albirex Baseball Club was added to Eastern League for the 2024 season.
