= 2024 Nippon Professional Baseball season =

75th annual season of Nippon Professional Baseball

2024 NPB season
- League: Nippon Professional Baseball
- Sport: Baseball
- Duration: March 29 – October 9
- Games: 858
- Teams: 12
- Total attendance: 26,681,715

Central League pennant
- League champions: Yomiuri Giants
- Runners-up: Hanshin Tigers
- Season MVP: Tomoyuki Sugano (Yomiuri)

Pacific League pennant
- League champions: Fukuoka SoftBank Hawks
- Runners-up: Hokkaido Nippon-Ham Fighters
- Season MVP: Kensuke Kondoh (SoftBank)

Climax Series
- CL champions: Yokohama DeNA BayStars
- CL runners-up: Yomiuri Giants
- PL champions: Fukuoka SoftBank Hawks
- PL runners-up: Hokkaido Nippon-Ham Fighters

Japan Series
- Venue: Mizuho PayPay Dome Fukuoka, Chūō-ku, Fukuoka; Yokohama Stadium, Yokohama, Kanagawa
- Champions: Yokohama DeNA BayStars
- Runners-up: Fukuoka SoftBank Hawks
- Finals MVP: Masayuki Kuwahara (DeNA)

NPB seasons
- ← 2023 2025 →

The 2024 Nippon Professional Baseball season was the 75th season of professional baseball in Japan since Nippon Professional Baseball (NPB) was reorganized in 1950 and the 90th anniversary of the founding of professional baseball in Japan. There were 12 NPB teams, split evenly between the Central League and Pacific League.

The Hanshin Tigers entered the season as the defending champions. They were eliminated in the first stage of the Central League Climax Series against the Yokohama DeNA BayStars.

== Regular season standings ==
2024 Central League regular season standings
#	Team	G	W	L	T	Pct.	GB	Home	Road
1	Yomiuri Giants	143	77	59	7	.566	—	39–30–3	38–29–4
2	Hanshin Tigers	143	74	63	6	.540	3½	43–27–2	31–36–4
3	Yokohama DeNA BayStars	143	71	69	3	.507	8	34–37–1	37–32–2
4	Hiroshima Toyo Carp	143	68	70	5	.493	10	39–29–3	29–41–2
5	Tokyo Yakult Swallows	143	62	77	4	.446	16½	34–33–4	28–44
6	Chunichi Dragons	143	60	75	8	.444	16½	35–32–4	25–43–4

2024 Pacific League regular season standings
#	Team	G	W	L	T	Pct.	GB	Home	Road
1	Fukuoka SoftBank Hawks	143	91	49	3	.650	—	49–21–2	42–28–1
2	Hokkaido Nippon-Ham Fighters	143	75	60	8	.556	13½	41–25–6	34–35–2
3	Chiba Lotte Marines	143	71	66	6	.518	18½	37–33–1	34–33–5
4	Tohoku Rakuten Golden Eagles	143	67	72	4	.482	23½	30–39–2	37–33–2
5	Orix Buffaloes	143	63	77	3	.450	28	34–36–1	29–41–2
6	Saitama Seibu Lions	143	49	91	3	.350	42	31–40–1	18–51–2

=== Interleague ===
2024 regular season interleague standings
#	Team	G	W	L	T	Pct.	GB	Home	Road
1	Tohoku Rakuten Golden Eagles	18	13	5	0	.722	—	6–3	7–2
2	Fukuoka SoftBank Hawks	18	12	6	0	.667	1	7–2	5–4
3	Yokohama DeNA BayStars	18	11	7	0	.611	2	3–6	8–1
4	Tokyo Yakult Swallows	18	9	7	2	.563	3	5–2−2	4–5
5	Orix Buffaloes	18	10	8	0	.556	3	4–5	6–3
6	Hiroshima Toyo Carp	18	10	8	0	.556	3	6–3	4–5
7	Yomiuri Giants	18	8	9	1	.471	4½	4–5	4–4–1
8	Chiba Lotte Marines	18	7	9	2	.438	5	4–5	3–4−2
9	Hokkaido Nippon-Ham Fighters	18	7	10	1	.412	5½	3–5–1	4–5
10	Hanshin Tigers	18	7	11	0	.388	6	4–5	3–6
11	Chunichi Dragons	18	7	11	0	.388	6	3–6	4–5
12	Saitama Seibu Lions	18	4	14	0	.222	9	3–6	2–7

Overall, the Pacific League won 53 games and lost 52 against the Central League, with 3 ties.

== Climax Series ==
First stage
Central League
2	Hanshin Tigers	0
3	Yokohama DeNA BayStars	2
Pacific League
2	Hokkaido Nippon-Ham Fighters	2
3	Chiba Lotte Marines	1

Final stage
1	Yomiuri Giants	3
3	Yokohama DeNA BayStars	4
1	Fukuoka SoftBank Hawks	4
2	Hokkaido Nippon-Ham Fighters	0

Japan Series
CL	Yokohama DeNA BayStars	4
PL	Fukuoka SoftBank Hawks	2

=== First stage ===
==== Central League ====
Yokohama DeNA BayStars won the series, 2–0.

Game	Date	Score	Location	Time	Attendance
1	October 12	Yokohama DeNA BayStars – 3, Hanshin Tigers – 1	Koshien Stadium	3:19	42,642
2	October 13	Yokohama DeNA BayStars – 10, Hanshin Tigers – 3	Koshien Stadium	3:45	42,646

==== Pacific League ====
Hokkaido Nippon-Ham Fighters won the series, 2–1.

Game	Date	Score	Location	Time	Attendance
1	October 12	Chiba Lotte Marines – 2, Hokkaido Nippon-Ham Fighters – 0	Es Con Field Hokkaido	2:55	37,553
2	October 13	Chiba Lotte Marines – 2, Hokkaido Nippon-Ham Fighters – 3 (10)	Es Con Field Hokkaido	3:33	37,638
3	October 14	Chiba Lotte Marines – 2, Hokkaido Nippon-Ham Fighters – 5	Es Con Field Hokkaido	3:04	37,478

=== Central League ===
Yokohama DeNA BayStars won the series, 4–2.

Game	Date	Score	Location	Time	Attendance
1	October 16	Yokohama DeNA BayStars – 2, Yomiuri Giants – 0	Tokyo Dome	3:05	42,076
2	October 17	Yokohama DeNA BayStars – 2, Yomiuri Giants – 1	Tokyo Dome	2:31	42,006
3	October 18	Yokohama DeNA BayStars – 2, Yomiuri Giants – 1	Tokyo Dome	3:06	42,180
4	October 19	Yokohama DeNA BayStars – 1, Yomiuri Giants – 4	Tokyo Dome	2:54	42,222
5	October 20	Yokohama DeNA BayStars – 0, Yomiuri Giants – 1	Tokyo Dome	2:40	42,152
6	October 21	Yokohama DeNA BayStars – 3, Yomiuri Giants – 2	Tokyo Dome	3:43	41,856

=== Pacific League ===
SoftBank won the series, 4–0.

Game	Date	Score	Location	Time	Attendance
1	October 16	Hokkaido Nippon-Ham Fighters – 2, Fukuoka SoftBank Hawks – 5	Mizuho PayPay Dome	2:40	40,142
2	October 17	Hokkaido Nippon-Ham Fighters – 2, Fukuoka SoftBank Hawks – 7	Mizuho PayPay Dome	3:18	40,142
3	October 18	Hokkaido Nippon-Ham Fighters – 2, Fukuoka SoftBank Hawks – 3	Mizuho PayPay Dome	2:50	40,142

== 2024 Japan Series ==
DeNA won the series, 4–2.

Game	Date	Score	Location	Time	Attendance
1	October 26	Fukuoka SoftBank Hawks – 5, Yokohama DeNA BayStars – 3	Yokohama Stadium	3:46	33,147
2	October 27	Fukuoka SoftBank Hawks – 6, Yokohama DeNA BayStars – 3	Yokohama Stadium	3:20	32,953
3	October 29	Yokohama DeNA BayStars – 4, Fukuoka SoftBank Hawks – 1	Mizuho PayPay Dome	3:37	36,736
4	October 30	Yokohama DeNA BayStars – 5, Fukuoka SoftBank Hawks – 0	Mizuho PayPay Dome	3:19	36,623
5	October 31	Yokohama DeNA BayStars – 7, Fukuoka SoftBank Hawks – 0	Mizuho PayPay Dome	3:38	36,636
6	November 3 (Note: Game 6 was scheduled to be played on November 2nd, but was postponed due to rain.)	Fukuoka SoftBank Hawks – 2, Yokohama DeNA BayStars – 11	Yokohama Stadium	3:11	33,136

== Awards ==
The following players were bestowed awards ranging from the Best Nine to MVP.

=== Central League ===
Award	Player	Team
Most Valuable Player	Tomoyuki Sugano	Yomiuri Giants
Rookie of the Year	Hiromasa Funabasama	Yomiuri Giants
Best Nine
Pitcher	Tomoyuki Sugano	Yomiuri Giants
Catcher	Yūdai Yamamoto	Yokohama DeNA BayStars
First Base	Kazuma Okamoto	Yomiuri Giants
Second Base	Naoki Yoshikawa	Yomiuri Giants
Third Base	Munetaka Murakami	Tokyo Yakult Swallows
Shortstop	Hideki Nagaoka	Tokyo Yakult Swallows
Outfield	Domingo Santana	Tokyo Yakult Swallows
Outfield	Seiya Hosokawa	Chunichi Dragons
Outfield	Kōji Chikamoto	Hanshin Tigers

=== Pacific League ===
Award	Player	Team
Most Valuable Player	Kensuke Kondoh	SoftBank Hawks
Rookie of the Year	Natsuki Takeuchi	Seibu Lions
Best Nine
Pitcher	Kohei Arihara	SoftBank Hawks
Catcher	Toshiya Satoh	Chiba Lotte Marines
First Base	Hotaka Yamakawa	SoftBank Hawks
Second Base	Hiroto Kobukata	Tohoku Rakuten Golden Eagles
Third Base	Ryoya Kurihara	SoftBank Hawks
Shortstop	Kenta Imamiya	SoftBank Hawks
Outfield	Ryosuke Tatsumi	Tohoku Rakuten Golden Eagles
Outfield	Kensuke Kondoh	SoftBank Hawks
Outfield	Ukyo Shuto	SoftBank Hawks
Designated Hitter	Franmil Reyes	Hokkaido Nippon-Ham Fighters

== Attendances ==
The average attendance was 31,097.

#	Team	Average
1	Hanshin Tigers	41,801
2	Yomiuri Giants	39,247
3	Fukuoka SoftBank Hawks	37,862
4	Chunichi Dragons	32,951
5	Yokohama DeNA BayStars	32,754
6	ORIX Buffaloes	30,270
7	Hiroshima Toyo Carp	29,376
8	Hokkaido Nippon-Ham Fighters	28,830
9	Tokyo Yakult Swallows	28,153
10	Chiba Lotte Marines	26,975
11	Tohoku Rakuten Golden Eagles	23,132
12	Saitama Seibu Lions	21,601

== See also ==
- 2024 Major League Baseball season
- 2024 KBO League season
- 2024 Mexican League season
- 2024 Chinese Professional Baseball League season
- 2024 Frontier League season
- 2024 Pioneer League season
