= 2023 Tohoku Rakuten Golden Eagles season =

Professional sports season in Nippon Professional Baseball

2023 Tohoku Rakuten Golden Eagles
- League: Pacific League
- Ballpark: Rakuten Mobile Park Miyagi
- Record: 70–71–2 (.497)
- League place: 4th
- Parent company: Rakuten
- President: Yosuke Yoneda; Masayuki Morii
- General manager: Kazuhisa Ishii
- Manager: Kazuhisa Ishii
- Captain: Hideto Asamura
- Average attendance: 18,868

The 2023 Tohoku Rakuten Golden Eagles season was the 19th season of the Tohoku Rakuten Golden Eagles franchise. The Eagles play their home games at Rakuten Mobile Park Miyagi in the city of Sendai as members of Nippon Professional Baseball's Pacific League. The team was led by Kazuhisa Ishii in his third season as team manager.

== Regular season ==
=== Standings ===
2023 Pacific League regular season standings
Pos	Team	G	W	L	T	Pct.	GB	Home	Road
1	Orix Buffaloes^{†}	143	86	53	4	.619	—	41–28–3	45–25–1
2	Chiba Lotte Marines*	143	70	68	5	.507	15½	42–27–2	28–40–3
3	Fukuoka SoftBank Hawks*	143	71	69	3	.507	15½	39–32–0	32–37–3
**4**	**Tohoku Rakuten Golden Eagles**	**143**	**70**	**71**	**2**	**.496**	**17**	**38–33–1**	**32–38–1**
5	Saitama Seibu Lions	143	65	77	1	.458	22½	33–37–1	32–40–0
6	Hokkaido Nippon-Ham Fighters	143	60	82	1	.423	27½	31–40–0	29–42–1

^{†} = League champion and advanced directly to the final stage of the Climax Series
* = Advanced to the first stage of the Climax Series

=== Record vs. opponents ===
2023 record vs. opponents
Team	Buffaloes	Eagles	Fighters	Hawks	Lions	Marines	CL
Buffaloes	—	15–10	15–9–1	13–11−1	17–8	15–8−2	11–7
**Eagles**	**10–15**	—	**15–10**	**14–10−1**	**10–14–1**	**12–13**	**9–9**
Fighters	9–15–1	10–15	—	11–14	9–16	11–14	10–8
Hawks	11–13−1	10–14−1	14–11	—	13–12	12–12−1	11–7
Lions	8–17	14–10–1	16–9	12–13	—	9–16	6–12
Marines	8–15−2	13–12	14–11	12–12−1	16–9	—	7–9−2

=== Interleague ===
2023 regular season interleague standings
Pos	Team	G	W	L	T	Pct.	GB	Home	Road
1	Yokohama DeNA BayStars^{†}	18	11	7	0	.611	—	6–3	5–4
2	Fukuoka SoftBank Hawks	18	11	7	0	.611	—	4–5	7–2
3	Yomiuri Giants	18	11	7	0	.611	—	5–4	6–3
4	Orix Buffaloes	18	11	7	0	.611	—	4–5	7–2
5	Hokkaido Nippon-Ham Fighters	18	10	8	0	.556	1	4–5	6–3
**6**	**Tohoku Rakuten Golden Eagles**	**18**	**9**	**9**	**0**	**.500**	**2**	**5–4**	**4–5**
7	Hiroshima Toyo Carp	18	9	9	0	.500	2	4–5	5–4
8	Chiba Lotte Marines	18	7	9	2	.438	3	5–4	2–5−2
9	Chunichi Dragons	18	7	10	1	.412	3½	2–6−1	5–4
10	Hanshin Tigers	18	7	10	1	.412	3½	4–4−1	3–6
11	Tokyo Yakult Swallows	18	7	11	0	.389	4	3–6	4–5
12	Saitama Seibu Lions	18	6	12	0	.333	5	4–5	2–7

^{†} = Interleague champion

=== Chihō ballparks ===
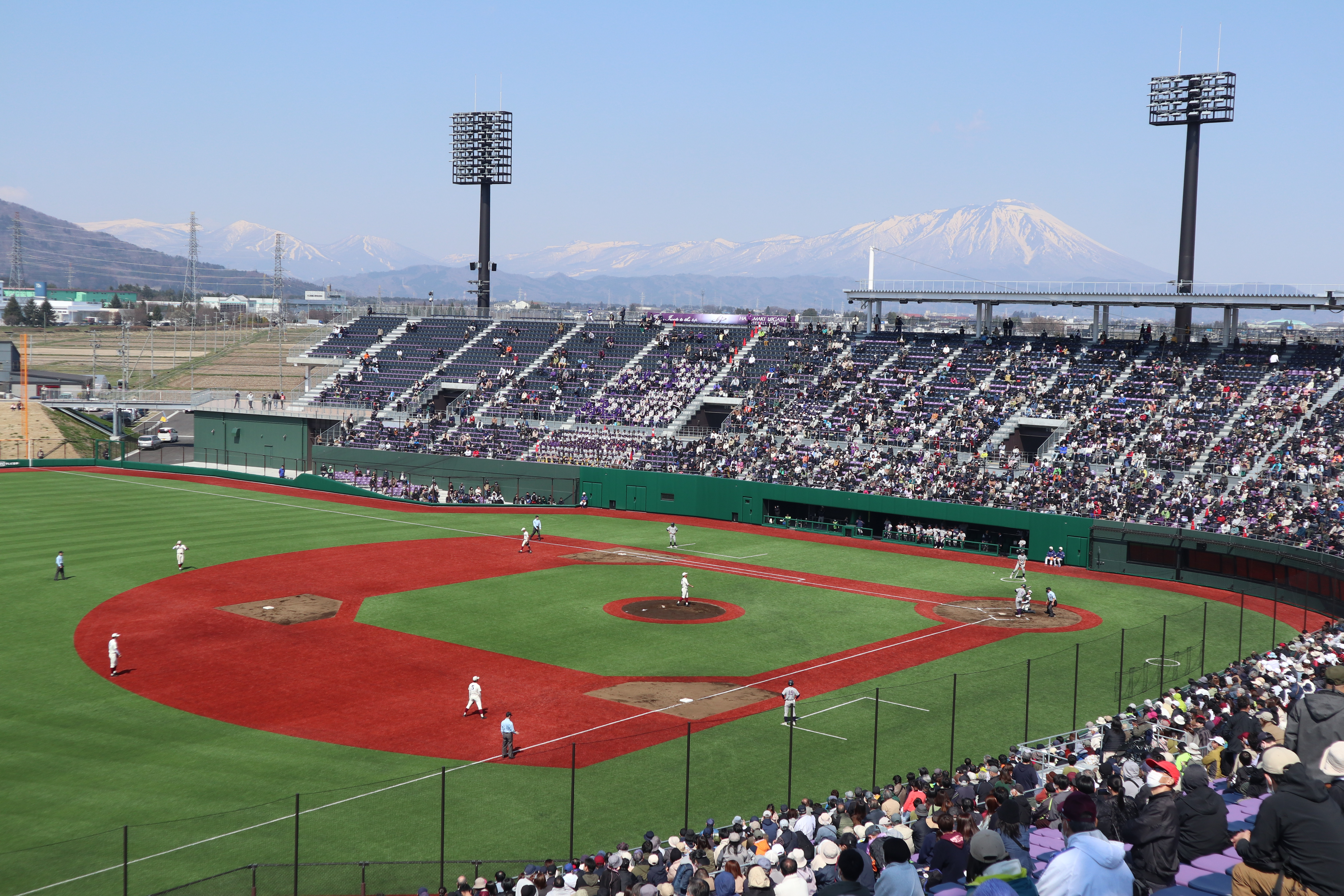
The first professional NPB game played at Kitagin Ballpark was hosted by the Eagles in 2023.

The Eagles hosted three home games outside of Rakuten Mobile Park Miyagi in 2023. Two were played at chihō, or "countryside", ballparks in Yamagata and Iwate Prefectures in Japan's Tōhoku region and the third was played at the Tokyo Dome in Tokyo. The game in Iwate Prefecture was played at the new Kitagin Ballpark; it was the first time a professional baseball game was played in the stadium.

2023 Tohoku Rakuten Golden Eagles chihō ballparks
Ballpark	City	Prefecture
Kirayaka Stadium	Yamagata	Yamagata Prefecture
Kitagin Ballpark	Morioka	Iwate Prefecture
Tokyo Dome	Bunkyō	Tokyo

=== Opening Day starting roster ===
Rakuten's 2023 Opening Day game was on Thursday, March 30, against the Hokkaido Nippon-Ham Fighters at Es Con Field Hokkaido. The game was the first official NPB game to be played at the new stadium.

2023 Rakuten Eagles Opening Day starting roster
Order	Player	Position
1	Ryosuke Tatsumi	Center fielder
2	Hiroto Kobukata	Left fielder
3	Maikel Franco	Designated hitter
4	Hideto Asamura	Second baseman
5	Hiroaki Shimauchi	Right fielder
6	Toshiki Abe	First baseman
7	Tsuyoshi Yamasaki	Shortstop
8	Yukiya Itoh	Third baseman
9	Yuma Yasuda	Catcher
—	Masahiro Tanaka	Starting pitcher

=== Game log ===
2023 game log: 70–71–2 (Home: 38–33–1; Away: 32–38–1)
March/April: 9–14–0 (Home: 4–6–0; Away: 5–8–0)

#	Date	Opponent	Score	Win	Loss	Save	Stadium	Attendance	Record	Streak
1	March 30	@ Fighters	3–1	**M. Tanaka** (1–0)	Kato (0–1)	**Y. Matsui** (1)	Es Con Field	31,092	1–0–0	W1
2	April 1	@ Fighters	3–4 (10)	Suzuki (1–0)	**Miyamori** (0–1)	—	Es Con Field	30,637	1–1–0	L1
3	April 2	@ Fighters	2–1	**Fujihira** (1–0)	Kitayama (0–1)	**Y. Matsui** (2)	Es Con Field	30,775	2–1–0	W1
4	April 4	Lions	0–4	Imai (1–0)	**Norimoto** (0–1)	—	Rakuten Mobile Park	24,365	2–2–0	L1
5	April 5	Lions	1–0	**Hayakawa** (1–0)	Sumida (0–1)	**Y. Matsui** (3)	Rakuten Mobile Park	21,526	3–2–0	W1
6	April 6	Lions	1–2	Matsumoto (1–0)	**M. Tanaka** (1–1)	Masuda (1)	Rakuten Mobile Park	19,034	3–3–0	L1
7	April 8	@ Marines	4–5	Sawamura (1–0)	**Nishiguchi** (0–1)	Masuda (3)	Zozo Marine Stadium	27,444	3–4–0	L2
8	April 9	@ Marines	1–10	Taneichi (1–1)	**Kishi** (0–1)	—	Zozo Marine Stadium	28,848	3–5–0	L3
9	April 11	Buffaloes	0–6	Yamashita (1–0)	**Norimoto** (0–2)	—	Rakuten Mobile Park	13,165	3–6–0	L4
10	April 12	Buffaloes	2–7	Tajima (1–1)	**Hayakawa** (1–1)	—	Rakuten Mobile Park	12,488	3–7–0	L5
11	April 14	Hawks	3–0	**M. Tanaka** (2–1)	Wada (1–1)	**Y. Matsui** (4)	Rakuten Mobile Park	15,728	4–7–0	W1
—	April 15	Hawks	Postponed (rain) – Makeup date: October 7				Rakuten Mobile Park	—	—	—
12	April 16	Hawks	3–6	Tsumori (2–0)	**Nishiguchi** (0–2)	Osuna (3)	Rakuten Mobile Park	18,504	4–8–0	L1
13	April 18	@ Buffaloes	5–1	**M. Itoh** (1–0)	Waguespack (2–1)	—	Kyocera Dome	15,173	5–8–0	W1
14	April 19	@ Buffaloes	1–2	Tajima (2–1)	**Nishiguchi** (0–3)	Yo. Hirano (4)	Kyocera Dome	14,983	5–9–0	L1
15	April 20	@ Buffaloes	1–3	Yamasaki (1–0)	**Fujihira** (1–1)	Waguespack (1)	Kyocera Dome	13,873	5–10–0	L2
16	April 21	Fighters	8–7	**Suzuki** (1–0)	S. Tanaka (0–1)	—	Rakuten Mobile Park	16,442	6–10–0	W1
17	April 22	Fighters	3–5	Uwasawa (2–1)	**Shoji** (0–1)	Miyanishi (1)	Rakuten Mobile Park	17,161	6–11–0	L1
18	April 23	Fighters	4–3 (11)	**Uchi** (1–0)	Tamai (0–1)	—	Rakuten Mobile Park	21,128	7–11–0	W1
—	April 25	@ Hawks	Postponed (rain) – Makeup date: October 2				Kitakyushu Stadium	—	—	—
19	April 26	@ Hawks	2–4	Wada (2–1)	**Hayakawa** (1–2)	Osuna (4)	PayPay Dome	34,858	7–12–0	L1
20	April 27	@ Hawks	3–5	Mori (1–0)	**Takinaka** (0–1)	Osuna (5)	PayPay Dome	35,102	7–13–0	L2
21	April 28	@ Lions	0–4	Imai (3–0)	**M. Tanaka** (2–2)	—	Belluna Dome	16,453	7–14–0	L3
22	April 29	@ Lions	8–2	**Fujihira** (2–1)	K. Takahashi (3–1)	—	Belluna Dome	24,148	8–14–0	W1
23	April 30	@ Lions	7–6 (10)	**Y. Matsui** (1–0)	Yoza (0–1)	**Sakai** (1)	Belluna Dome	22,176	9–14–0	W2

May: 9–13–1 (Home: 7–8–0; Away: 2–5–1)

#	Date	Opponent	Score	Win	Loss	Save	Stadium	Attendance	Record	Streak
24	May 2	Marines	5–1	**Kishi** (1–1)	Nishino (3−1)	**Y. Matsui** (5)	Rakuten Mobile Park	21,550	10–14–0	W3
25	May 3	Marines	0−2 (10)	Sawamura (3–0)	**Uchi** (1–1)	Masuda (9)	Rakuten Mobile Park	25,143	10−15−0	L1
26	May 4	Marines	6−0	**T. Matsui** (1−0)	Mori (1−1)	—	Rakuten Mobile Park	25,134	11−15−0	W1
27	May 5	@ Fighters	2−5	Miyauchi (1−0)	**Nishiguchi** (0–4)	S. Tanaka (4)	Es Con Field	26,342	11−16−0	L1
28	May 6	@ Fighters	5−0	**Takinaka** (1–1)	Uwasawa (3–2)	—	Es Con Field	26,761	12−16−0	W1
29	May 7	@ Fighters	2−3	S. Tanaka (1−1)	**Miyamori** (0–2)	—	Es Con Field	25,250	12−17−0	L1
30	May 9	Buffaloes	0−2	Miyagi (4−0)	**Hayakawa** (1–3)	—	Rakuten Mobile Park	17,459	12−18−0	L2
31	May 10	Buffaloes	2−8	Tajima (4–2)	**Kishi** (1–2)	—	Rakuten Mobile Park	23,480	12−19−0	L3
32	May 11	Buffaloes	7−3	**Norimoto** (1–2)	Kuroki (0−2)	—	Rakuten Mobile Park	21,709	13−19−0	W1
33	May 12	@ Lions	4−4	Game tied after 12 innings			Belluna Dome	12,675	13−19−1	T1
34	May 13	@ Lions	4−7	K. Takahashi (3–1)	**Fujihira** (2–2)	Moriwaki (1)	Belluna Dome	18,417	13−20−1	L1
35	May 14	@ Lions	5−0	**Takinaka** (2–1)	Sumida (1–4)	—	Belluna Dome	22,257	14−20−1	W1
36	May 16	Hawks	3−0	**Hayakawa** (2–3)	Ohzeki (2−4)	**Y. Matsui** (6)	Kitagin Ballpark	16,070	15−20−1	W2
37	May 17	Hawks	1−10	Wada (3–1)	**Shoji** (0–2)	—	Kirayaka Stadium	9,912	15−21−1	L1
—	May 19	Marines	Postponed (rain) – Makeup date: October 9				Rakuten Mobile Park	—	—	—
38	May 20	Marines	1−6	Nishino (5−1)	**Norimoto** (1–3)	—	Rakuten Mobile Park	18,119	15−22−1	L2
39	May 21	Marines	4−6	Hirohata (1−0)	**Takinaka** (2–2)	Perdomo (1)	Rakuten Mobile Park	17,859	15−23−1	L3
40	May 23	@ Buffaloes	0−8	Yamashita (4–0)	**M. Tanaka** (2–3)	—	Hotto Motto Field	21,055	15−24−1	L4
41	May 24	@ Buffaloes	5−6	Waguespack (2–2)	**Y. Matsui** (1–1)	—	Hotto Motto Field	21,362	15−25−1	L5
42	May 26	Fighters	4−3	**Uchi** (2–1)	H. Itoh (2−4)	**Y. Matsui** (7)	Rakuten Mobile Park	16,444	16−25−1	W1
43	May 27	Fighters	1−3	Suzuki (4–2)	**T. Matsui** (1−1)	S. Tanaka (7)	Rakuten Mobile Park	20,111	16−26−1	L1
44	May 28	Fighters	3−2 (12)	**Sung** (1−0)	Rodriguez (0−3)	—	Rakuten Mobile Park	20,954	17−26−1	W1
45	May 30	BayStars	2−3	Imanaga (3−1)	**Norimoto** (1–4)	—	Rakuten Mobile Park	13,061	17−27−1	L1
46	May 31	BayStars	3−1	**M. Tanaka** (3–3)	Wendelken (1−1)	**Y. Matsui** (8)	Rakuten Mobile Park	13,677	18−27−1	W1

June: 10–13–0 (Home: 4–6–0; Away: 6–7–0)

#	Date	Opponent	Score	Win	Loss	Save	Stadium	Attendance	Record	Streak
47	June 1	BayStars	3−11	K. Azuma (5−2)	**Takinaka** (2–3)	—	Rakuten Mobile Park	12,406	18−28−1	L1
—	June 2	@ Swallows	Postponed (rain) – Makeup date: June 20				Meiji Jingu Stadium	—	—	—
48	June 3	@ Swallows	5−9	Peters (2−1)	**Hayakawa** (2–4)	—	Meiji Jingu Stadium	29,345	18−29−1	L2
49	June 4	@ Swallows	2−5	Kozawa (1−1)	**Shoji** (0–3)	Taguchi (12)	Meiji Jingu Stadium	29,602	18−30−1	L3
50	June 6	Tigers	4−1	**Norimoto** (2–4)	Murakami (5−2)	**Y. Matsui** (9)	Rakuten Mobile Park	16,028	19−30−1	W1
51	June 7	Tigers	3−11	Y. Nishi	**M. Tanaka** (3–4)	—	Rakuten Mobile Park	17,168	19−31−1	L1
52	June 8	Tigers	6−4	**Uchi** (3–1)	Yuasa (0−1)	—	Rakuten Mobile Park	16,498	20−31−1	W1
53	June 9	Dragons	5−4	**S. Watanabe** (1−0)	Ogasawara (4−3)	**Y. Matsui** (10)	Rakuten Mobile Park	15,302	21−31−1	W2
54	June 10	Dragons	1−0	**Hayakawa** (3–4)	Matsuba (0−1)	**Y. Matsui** (11)	Rakuten Mobile Park	23,562	22−31−1	W3
—	June 11	Dragons	Postponed (rain) – Makeup date: June 21				Rakuten Mobile Park	—	—	—
55	June 13	@ Carp	6−3	**Norimoto** (3–4)	Ohsera (2−5)	**Y. Matsui** (12)	Mazda Stadium	28,430	23−31−1	W4
56	June 14	@ Carp	3−4	Yasaki (4−0)	**Y. Matsui** (1−2)	—	Mazda Stadium	23,949	23−32−1	L1
57	June 15	@ Carp	11−7	**S. Watanabe** (2−0)	Shimauchi (1−2)	—	Mazda Stadium	23,169	24−32−1	W1
58	June 16	@ Giants	5−6	Ohe (4−0)	**Sakai** (0−1)	—	Tokyo Dome	36,916	24−33−1	L1
59	June 17	@ Giants	2−1	**Hayakawa** (4–4)	Griffin (4−3)	**Y. Matsui** (13)	Tokyo Dome	40,845	25−33−1	W1
60	June 18	@ Giants	2−1	**Kishi** (2–2)	Sugano (1−1)	**Y. Matsui** (14)	Tokyo Dome	40,929	26−33−1	W2
61	June 20	@ Swallows	0−13	Yamamoto (1−0)	**Fujihira** (2–3)	—	Meiji Jingu Stadium	16,182	26−34−1	L1
62	June 21	Dragons	2−5	Takahashi (3−6)	**Takinaka** (2–4)	Martínez (15)	Rakuten Mobile Park	13,959	26−35−1	L2
63	June 23	Lions	4−5	Hirai (3−2)	**Sakai** (0−2)	Masuda (10)	Rakuten Mobile Park	13,794	26−36−1	L3
64	June 24	Lions	0−1	K. Takahashi (5–5)	**Karashima** (0−1)	Masuda (11)	Rakuten Mobile Park	18,276	26−37−1	L4
65	June 25	Lions	2−5	Sumida (3–6)	**Hayakawa** (4–5)	Moriwaki (3)	Rakuten Mobile Park	17,065	26−38−1	L5
66	June 26	@ Hawks	3−1	**M. Tanaka** (4–4)	Wada (5–3)	**Y. Matsui** (15)	Tokyo Dome	41,876	27−38−1	W1
67	June 28	@ Hawks	2−3	Moinelo (3−0)	**S. Watanabe** (2−1)	Osuna (14)	PayPay Dome	34,351	27−39−1	L1
68	June 29	@ Hawks	2−3	Ohtsu (2−0)	**Uchi** (3–2)	Osuna (15)	PayPay Dome	36,157	27−40−1	L2
69	June 30	@ Marines	5−4	**Sakai** (1−2)	Perdomo (0−1)	**Y. Matsui** (16)	Zozo Marine Stadium	18,546	28−40−1	W1

July: 15–7–0 (Home: 8–4–0; Away: 7–3–0)

#	Date	Opponent	Score	Win	Loss	Save	Stadium	Attendance	Record	Streak
70	July 1	@ Marines	2−10	Taneichi (5–3)	**Karashima** (0−2)	—	Zozo Marine Stadium	25,370	28−41−1	L1
71	July 2	@ Marines	11−4	**Fujii** (1−0)	Mercedes (3−4)	—	Zozo Marine Stadium	23,051	29−41−1	W1
72	July 4	Buffaloes	7−9	Udagawa (1−0)	**M. Tanaka** (4–5)	Yo. Hirano (13)	Tokyo Dome	40,502	29−42−1	L1
73	July 5	Buffaloes	6−1	**Shoji** (1–3)	Miyagi (6−3)	—	Rakuten Mobile Park	12,575	30−42−1	W1
74	July 6	Buffaloes	3−0	**Kishi** (3–2)	Yamashita (7–2)	**Y. Matsui** (17)	Rakuten Mobile Park	12,087	31−42−1	W2
75	July 7	Hawks	6−5	**Norimoto** (4–4)	Arihara (3−1)	**Y. Matsui** (18)	Rakuten Mobile Park	14,613	32−42−1	W3
76	July 8	Hawks	8−1	**Karashima** (1−2)	Higashihama (5−6)	—	Rakuten Mobile Park	23,950	33−42−1	W4
77	July 9	Hawks	5−1	**Fujii** (2−0)	Ishikawa (3−4)	—	Rakuten Mobile Park	20,028	34−42−1	W5
78	July 11	@ Fighters	3−2	**M. Tanaka** (5–5)	Kitayama (5–4)	**Y. Matsui** (19)	Es Con Field	26,855	35−42−1	W6
79	July 12	@ Fighters	4−3	**Sung** (2−0)	H. Itoh (5−5)	**Y. Matsui** (20)	Es Con Field	25,936	36−42−1	W7
80	July 13	@ Fighters	3−2	**Sakai** (2−2)	S. Tanaka (2–2)	**Y. Matsui** (21)	Es Con Field	29,010	37−42−1	W8
81	July 15	@ Marines	7−9	T. Nakamura (1−0)	**Sakai** (2−3)	Masuda (23)	Zozo Marine Stadium	25,560	37−43−1	L1
82	July 16	@ Marines	7−6	**S. Watanabe** (3−1)	Masuda (2−2)	**Y. Matsui** (22)	Zozo Marine Stadium	26,617	38−43−1	W1
83	July 17	@ Marines	4−2	**Anraku** (1−0)	Taneichi (6–4)	**Y. Matsui** (23)	Zozo Marine Stadium	22,098	39−43−1	W2
All-Star Break: PL defeats the CL, 2–0
84	July 22	@ Lions	1−2	Imai (5–2)	**Karashima** (2−2)	Masuda (16)	Belluna Dome	17,606	39−44−1	L1
85	July 23	@ Lions	4−2	**Norimoto** (5–4)	Enns (1−8)	**S. Suzuki** (1)	Belluna Dome	15,685	40−44−1	W1
86	July 25	Fighters	3−1	**Hayakawa** (5–5)	Kato (5–7)	**S. Watanabe** (1)	Rakuten Mobile Park	16,158	41−44−1	W2
87	July 26	Fighters	2−3	Ikeda (1−3)	**S. Suzuki** (1−1)	S. Tanaka (15)	Rakuten Mobile Park	16,935	41−45−1	L1
88	July 27	Fighters	5−9	Kitayama (6–4)	**M. Tanaka** (5–6)	—	Rakuten Mobile Park	15,082	41−46−1	L2
89	July 28	Lions	5−1	**Kishi** (4–2)	Taira (6−5)	—	Rakuten Mobile Park	15,164	42−46−1	W1
90	July 29	Lions	1−3	Imai (6–2)	**Karashima** (2−4)	Masuda (18)	Rakuten Mobile Park	18,855	42−47−1	L1
91	July 30	Lions	5−4 (10)	**Sakai** (3−3)	Mizukami (0−1)	—	Rakuten Mobile Park	17,209	43−47−1	W1

August: 12–12–0 (Home: 9–5–0; Away: 3–7–0)

#	Date	Opponent	Score	Win	Loss	Save	Stadium	Attendance	Record	Streak
92	August 1	@ Buffaloes	2−6	Yamamoto (10−4)	**Hayakawa** (5–6)	Yamazaki (5)	Kyocera Dome	28,527	43−48−1	L1
93	August 2	@ Buffaloes	2−3	Yo. Hirano (3−1)	**Anraku** (1−1)	—	Kyocera Dome	21,651	43−49−1	L2
94	August 3	@ Buffaloes	9−1	**M. Tanaka** (6–6)	Waguespack (3–5)	—	Kyocera Dome	23,016	44−49−1	W1
95	August 4	Marines	3−5	Taneichi (8–4)	**Kishi** (4–3)	Tojo (1)	Rakuten Mobile Park	17,035	44−50−1	L1
96	August 5	Marines	7−6	**Sakai** (4−3)	Perdomo (1−2)	**Y. Matsui** (24)	Rakuten Mobile Park	16,501	45−50−1	W1
97	August 6	Marines	2−1	**Norimoto** (6–4)	Ojima (5−4)	**Y. Matsui** (25)	Rakuten Mobile Park	18,018	46−50−1	W2
98	August 8	@ Hawks	9−3	**Hayakawa** (6–6)	Taura (2−1)	—	PayPay Dome	35,203	47−50−1	W3
—	August 9	@ Hawks	Postponed (Typhoon Khanun) – Makeup date: October 3				PayPay Dome	—	—	—
99	August 10	@ Hawks	4−11	Wada (6–4)	**M. Tanaka** (6–7)	—	PayPay Dome	37,974	47−51−1	L1
100	August 11	Buffaloes	5−0	**Kishi** (5–3)	Yamasaki (8–3)	—	Rakuten Mobile Park	22,313	48−51−1	W1
—	August 12	Buffaloes	Postponed (rain) – Makeup date: September 14				Rakuten Mobile Park	—	—	—
101	August 13	Buffaloes	0−1	Udagawa (3−0)	**Norimoto** (6–5)	Yo. Hirano (19)	Rakuten Mobile Park	20,526	48−52−1	L1
102	August 15	@ Lions	5−3	**S. Watanabe** (4−1)	Masuda (4−3)	**Y. Matsui** (26)	Belluna Dome	20,414	49−52−1	W1
103	August 16	@ Lions	1−4	Imai (7–3)	**Karashima** (1−5)	—	Belluna Dome	18,194	49−53−1	L1
104	August 17	@ Lions	2−4	Sumida (7–7)	**M. Tanaka** (6–8)	Aoyama (3)	Belluna Dome	16,496	49−54−1	L2
105	August 18	Marines	1−4	Taneichi (10–4)	**Kishi** (5–4)	Masuda (30)	Rakuten Mobile Park	20,021	49−55−1	L3
106	August 19	Marines	7−5	**S. Watanabe** (5−1)	Perdomo (1−3)	**Y. Matsui** (27)	Rakuten Mobile Park	21,266	50−55−1	W1
107	August 20	Marines	3−4	Nishimura (3−0)	**Y. Matsui** (1−3)	Masuda (31)	Rakuten Mobile Park	20,028	50−56−1	L1
108	August 22	@ Fighters	2−6	Kato (5–7)	**Hayakawa** (6–7)	—	Es Con Field	23,563	50−57−1	L2
109	August 23	@ Fighters	4−10	Ponce (2−4)	**T. Matsui** (1−2)	—	Es Con Field	22,435	50−58−1	L3
110	August 25	Hawks	3−2 (10)	**S. Watanabe** (6−1)	Kaino (1−1)	—	Rakuten Mobile Park	26,372	51−58−1	W1
111	August 26	Hawks	2−1	**M. Tanaka** (7–8)	Bando (4−3)	**Y. Matsui** (28)	Rakuten Mobile Park	25,669	52−58−1	W2
112	August 27	Hawks	7−1	**Shoji** (2–3)	Matsumoto (0−1)	—	Rakuten Mobile Park	18,408	53−58−1	W3
113	August 29	Lions	2−1	**Norimoto** (7–5)	Matsumoto (4–8)	**Y. Matsui** (29)	Rakuten Mobile Park	13,952	54−58−1	W4
114	August 30	Lions	6−4	**Uchi** (4–2)	Masuda (4−4)	—	Rakuten Mobile Park	14,812	55−58−1	W5
115	August 31	Lions	4−5	Kumon (1−0)	**S. Watanabe** (6−2)	Kriske (1)	Rakuten Mobile Park	13,537	55−59−1	L1

September/October: 15–11–1 (Home: 6–3–1; Away: 9–8–0)

#	Date	Opponent	Score	Win	Loss	Save	Stadium	Attendance	Record	Streak
116	September 1	@ Marines	0−5	Mima (2−7)	**Kishi** (5–5)	—	Zozo Marine Stadium	22,535	55−60−1	L2
117	September 2	@ Marines	5−3	**Anraku** (2−1)	Masuda (2−4)	**Y. Matsui** (30)	Zozo Marine Stadium	28,857	56−60−1	W1
118	September 3	@ Marines	5−4	**Shoji** (3–3)	Nakamori (1−2)	**Y. Matsui** (31)	Zozo Marine Stadium	27,729	57−60−1	W2
—	September 5	Fighters	Postponed (rain) – Makeup date: September 22				Rakuten Mobile Park	—	—	—
—	September 6	Fighters	Postponed (rain) – Makeup date: October 5				Rakuten Mobile Park	—	—	—
119	September 8	@ Hawks	8−6	**Kishi** (6–5)	Ishikawa (4−7)	**Y. Matsui** (32)	PayPay Dome	34,795	58−60−1	W3
120	September 9	@ Hawks	2−7	Kaino (2−1)	**M. Tanaka** (7–9)	—	PayPay Dome	38,331	58−61−1	L1
121	September 10	@ Hawks	6−4	**Shoji** (4–3)	Bando (5−4)	**Y. Matsui** (33)	PayPay Dome	38,139	59−61−1	W1
122	September 12	@ Marines	3−5	Sawada (2−0)	**Norimoto** (7–6)	Masuda (35)	Zozo Marine Stadium	24,234	59−62−1	L1
123	September 13	@ Marines	5−3	**S. Watanabe** (7−2)	Masuda (2−5)	**Y. Matsui** (34)	Zozo Marine Stadium	24,200	60−62−1	W1
124	September 14	Buffaloes	0−2 (11)	Yamazaki (1−0)	**Anraku** (2−2)	Yamaoka (1)	Rakuten Mobile Park	21,539	60−63−1	L1
125	September 16	@ Buffaloes	3−1	**Kishi** (7–5)	Yamamoto (14−6)	**Y. Matsui** (35)	Kyocera Dome	35,360	61−63−1	W1
126	September 17	@ Buffaloes	4−6	Udagawa (4−0)	**Sung** (2−1)	Yamazaki (8)	Kyocera Dome	35,688	61−64−1	L1
127	September 18	@ Buffaloes	3−6	Kogita (3−0)	**M. Tanaka** (7–10)	Yamazaki (9)	Kyocera Dome	33,773	61−65−1	L2
128	September 19	Hawks	3−2	**Norimoto** (8–6)	Matayoshi (2−2)	**Y. Matsui** (36)	Rakuten Mobile Park	20,048	62−65−1	W1
129	September 20	Hawks	6−1	**Fujii** (3−0)	Ohzeki (4−7)	—	Rakuten Mobile Park	20,300	63−65−1	W2
130	September 21	Lions	2−7	Imai (10–4)	Shiomi (0−1)	—	Rakuten Mobile Park	14,031	63−66−1	L1
131	September 22	Fighters	0−3	Kanemura (2−1)	**Fujihira** (2–4)	S. Tanaka (24)	Rakuten Mobile Park	15,811	63−67−1	L2
132	September 23	Fighters	4−1	**Kishi** (8–5)	Uwasawa (8–9)	**Y. Matsui** (37)	Rakuten Mobile Park	25,946	64−67−1	W1
133	September 24	Fighters	3−1	**Y. Matsui** (2−3)	Ikeda (1−5)	—	Rakuten Mobile Park	25,561	65−67−1	W2
134	September 25	@ Fighters	9−1	**S. Watanabe** (8−2)	Itoh (7−10)	—	Es Con Field	26,010	66−67−1	W3
135	September 27	@ Lions	1−2	Hirai (4−3)	**S. Watanabe** (8−3)	Kriske (7)	Belluna Dome	24,873	66−68−1	L1
136	September 28	Buffaloes	9−5	**Anraku** (3−2)	Abe (3−5)	—	Rakuten Mobile Park	22,911	67−68−1	W1
137	September 30	@ Buffaloes	5−4	**Kishi** (9–5)	Tajima (6–4)	**Y. Matsui** (38)	Kyocera Dome	26,159	68−68−1	W2
138	October 1	@ Buffaloes	8−2	**Shoji** (5–3)	Kuroki (1−5)	—	Kyocera Dome	28,162	69−68−1	W3
139	October 2	@ Hawks	0−6	Ohzeki (5−7)	**M. Tanaka** (7–11)	—	PayPay Dome	37,413	69−69−1	L1
140	October 3	@ Hawks	3−7	Wada (8–6)	**Norimoto** (8–7)	Osuna (26)	PayPay Dome	38,597	69−70−1	L2
141	October 5	Fighters	5−3	**Sakai** (5−3)	Nemoto (3−1)	**Y. Matsui** (39)	Rakuten Mobile Park	24,997	70−70−1	W1
142	October 7	Hawks	5−5	Game tied after 12 innings			Rakuten Mobile Park	25,841	70−70−2	T1
—	October 9	Marines	Postponed (rain) – Makeup date: October 10				Rakuten Mobile Park	—	—	—
143	October 10	Marines	0−5	Ojima (10−6)	**Norimoto** (8–8)	—	Rakuten Mobile Park	25,630	70−71−2	L1

Win | Loss | Tie | Postponement | = Interleague play
**Bold** = Eagles team member

== Roster ==
2023 Tohoku Rakuten Golden Eagles
Roster
Pitchers: 1 Yuki Matsui; 11 Takayuki Kishi; 13 Manny Bañuelos; 14 Takahiro Norimoto; 17 Takahiro Shiomi; 18 Masahiro Tanaka; 19 Kosei Shoji; 20 Tomohiro Anraku; 21 Takahisa Hayakawa; 22 Ryuji Komago; 28 Tomohito Sakai; 29 Koichi Takada; 31 Shota Watanabe; 38 Hayato Yuge; 41 Mao Itoh; 43 Sung Chia-hao; 45 Tomotaka Matsui; 46 Shoma Fujihira; 47 Masaru Fujii; 49 Masaya Nishigaki; 52 Taisei Tsurusaki; 56 Sora Suzuki; 57 Ryota Takinaka; 58 Wataru Karashima; 60 Ryota Ishibashi; 62 Naoto Nishiguchi; 69 Seiryu Uchi; 72 Satoshi Miyamori	Catchers: 2 Hikaru Ohta; 26 Ginjiro Sumitani; 55 Yuma Yasuda; 65 Kengo Horiuchi; Infielders: 0 Hiroto Kobukata; 3 Hideto Asamura; 4 Toshiki Abe; 5 Eigoro Mogi; 7 Daichi Suzuki; 23 Maikel Franco; 24 Fumiya Kurokawa; 33 Ginji Akaminai; 34 Tsuyoshi Yamasaki; 39 Yukiya Itoh; 48 Yoshiaki Watanabe; 66 Itsuki Murabayashi	Outfielders: 6 Haruki Nishikawa; 8 Ryosuke Tatsumi; 25 Kazuki Tanaka; 27 Takero Okajima; 35 Hiroaki Shimauchi; 51 Yuya Ogo; 54 Ren Wada; 67 Yuya Shozui	Manager: 16 Kazuhisa Ishii; Coaches: 87 Manabu Satake (outfield defense/baserunning); 93 Taketoshi Goto (hitting); 98 Toshiaki Imae (hitting); 84 Yuhei Takai (hitting); 80 Takashi Ishii (pitching); 83 Satoshi Nagai (pitching); 75 Shinichiro Koyama (pitching); 82 Naoki Matoba (battery); 86 Tatsuya Shiokawa (infield defense/baserunning); 74 Naoto Watanabe (infield defense/baserunning/hitting)

== Player statistics ==
=== Batting ===
2023 Tohoku Rakuten Golden Eagles batting statistics
Player	G	AB	R	H	2B	3B	HR	RBI	SB	BB	K	AVG	OBP	SLG	TB
Toshiki Abe	78	216	16	55	17	1	4	24	0	27	47	.255	.340	.398	86
Ginji Akaminai	6	10	0	1	0	0	0	1	0	0	1	.100	.100	.100	1
Hideto Asamura	143	522	64	143	20	0	26	78	2	75	108	.274	.368	.462	241
Maikel Franco	95	312	31	69	11	0	12	32	0	21	52	.221	.273	.372	116
Takahisa Hayakawa	17	3	1	1	0	0	0	0	0	0	0	.333	.333	.333	1
Kengo Horiuchi	3	2	0	1	0	0	0	0	0	1	0	.500	.667	.500	1
Yukiya Itoh	87	188	20	46	6	1	5	16	3	15	48	.245	.301	.367	69
Wataru Karashima	10	1	0	0	0	0	0	0	0	0	1	.000	.000	.000	0
Takayuki Kishi	20	1	0	0	0	0	0	0	0	0	1	.000	.000	.000	0
Hiroto Kobukata	134	477	67	123	8	6	5	37	36	48	83	.258	.329	.331	158
Fumiya Kurokawa	9	22	1	2	0	0	1	2	0	0	5	.091	.087	.227	5
Eigoro Mogi	8	12	1	1	0	0	0	1	0	3	3	.083	.267	.083	1
Itsuki Murabayashi	98	301	35	77	14	2	2	32	11	21	55	.256	.311	.336	101
Haruki Nishikawa	35	72	11	13	2	1	1	4	2	11	24	.181	.286	.278	20
Takahiro Norimoto	24	3	0	0	0	0	0	0	0	0	3	.000	.000	.000	0
Yuya Ogo	120	390	53	102	16	3	10	49	13	36	85	.262	.321	.395	154
Hikaru Ohta	104	173	19	42	6	0	3	14	1	27	47	.243	.356	.330	57
Takero Okajima	114	361	33	96	20	0	6	43	3	33	67	.266	.327	.371	134
Hiroaki Shimauchi	104	322	21	76	13	0	7	38	2	41	41	.236	.325	.342	110
Kosei Shoji	19	2	0	0	0	0	0	0	0	0	0	.000	.000	.000	0
Yuya Shozui	1	1	0	0	0	0	0	0	0	1	0	.000	.500	.000	0
Ginjiro Sumitani	65	131	9	29	2	0	1	10	0	5	23	.221	.259	.260	34
Daichi Suzuki	101	250	25	61	9	1	5	27	0	24	36	.244	.330	.348	87
Kazuki Tanaka	95	34	22	3	0	0	2	3	3	5	13	.088	.205	.265	9
Masahiro Tanaka	24	2	0	0	0	0	0	0	0	0	2	.000	.000	.000	0
Ryosuke Tatsumi	133	434	45	114	16	5	9	43	13	40	99	.263	.341	.385	167
Ren Wada	2	5	0	1	0	0	0	2	0	0	3	.200	.167	.200	1
Yoshiaki Watanabe	25	49	3	7	0	0	0	3	0	5	7	.143	.222	.143	7
Tsuyoshi Yamasaki	117	261	29	53	6	5	2	19	13	35	58	.203	.303	.287	75
Yuma Yasuda	53	110	7	24	2	0	3	7	0	16	25	.218	.323	.318	35
Total：30 players	143	4,667	513	1,140	168	25	104	485	102	490	937	.244	.321	.358	1,670

Bold/italics denotes best in the league

=== Pitching ===
2023 Tohoku Rakuten Golden Eagles pitching statistics
Player	W	L	ERA	G	GS	SV	IP	H	R	ER	BB	K
Tomohiro Anraku	3	2	3.04	57	0	0	47.1	48	16	16	18	32
Manny Bañuelos	0	0	81.00	1	0	0	0.2	4	6	6	2	0
Shoma Fujihira	2	4	4.44	11	11	0	50.2	50	30	25	27	42
Masaru Fujii	3	0	2.29	10	6	0	35.1	28	12	9	18	24
Takahisa Hayakawa	6	7	3.44	17	17	0	96.2	102	42	37	27	78
Ryota Ishibashi	0	0	18.90	2	0	0	3.1	8	7	7	1	2
Mao Itoh	1	0	3.27	25	0	0	22	18	11	8	14	9
Wataru Karashima	1	5	4.56	10	10	0	51.1	57	27	26	16	24
Takayuki Kishi	9	5	3.07	20	20	0	120.1	123	44	41	20	76
Ryuji Komago	0	0	9.00	4	0	0	4	4	4	4	6	3
Tomotaka Matsui	1	2	3.86	6	3	0	18.2	15	9	8	8	13
Yuki Matsui	2	3	1.57	59	0	39	57.1	38	14	10	13	72
Satoshi Miyamori	0	2	7.71	24	0	0	21	30	18	18	14	15
Masaya Nishigaki	0	0	81.00	1	0	0	0.1	1	3	3	1	0
Naoto Nishiguchi	0	4	4.56	26	0	0	23.2	32	14	12	9	18
Takahiro Norimoto	8	8	2.61	24	24	0	155	134	57	45	44	111
Tomohito Sakai	5	3	2.98	47	0	1	42.1	36	17	14	25	30
Takahiro Shiomi	0	1	9.00	1	1	0	4	4	4	4	1	4
Kosei Shoji	5	3	3.36	19	19	0	109.2	90	43	41	48	93
Sung Chia-hao	2	1	2.89	49	0	0	46.2	41	16	15	11	35
Sora Suzuki	1	1	3.30	61	0	1	43.2	37	18	16	25	47
Koichi Takada	0	0	1.86	7	0	0	9.2	14	4	2	2	6
Ryota Takinaka	2	4	3.83	8	8	0	42.1	45	20	18	11	18
Masahiro Tanaka	7	11	4.91	24	24	0	139.1	156	79	76	38	81
Taisei Tsurusaki	0	0	1.86	7	0	0	9.2	11	2	2	0	7
Seiryu Uchi	4	2	2.28	53	0	0	55.1	38	17	14	17	35
Shota Watanabe	8	3	2.40	51	0	1	48.2	30	15	13	20	41
Hayato Yuge	0	0	5.59	12	0	0	9.2	12	7	6	4	5
Total：28 players	70	71	3.52	143	143	42	1,268.2	1,206	556	496	440	921

Bold/italics denotes best in the league

== Awards and honors ==
Taiju Life Monthly MVP Award

- Hideto Asamura - July (batter)

Best Nine Award

- Hideto Asamura - second baseman

Mitsui Golden Glove Award

- Ryosuke Tatsumi - outfielder

All-Star Series selections

- Masahiro Tanaka - pitcher
- Hiroto Kobukata - infielder

SKY PerfecTV! Sayonara Award

- Hiroto Kobukata - June (June 8)
- Hideto Asamura - August (August 30)

== Farm team ==
2023 Eastern League regular season standings
Pos	Team	G	W	L	T	Pct.	GB	Home	Road
1	Yomiuri Giants^{†}	124	74	44	6	.627	—	45–18	29–26–6
2	Tohoku Rakuten Golden Eagles	129	78	48	3	.619	0	41–22–2	37–26–1
3	Saitama Seibu Lions	124	71	49	4	.592	4	24–24–2	37–25–2
4	Yokohama DeNA BayStars	132	59	66	7	.472	18½	35–29–3	24–37–4
5	Hokkaido Nippon-Ham Fighters	128	54	67	7	.446	21½	29–30–6	25–37–1
6	Tokyo Yakult Swallows	122	45	73	4	.381	29	26–31–3	19–42–1
7	Chiba Lotte Marines	124	43	75	6	.364	31	21–37–3	22–38–3

^{†} = League champion

== Nippon Professional Baseball draft ==
2023 Tohoku Rakuten Golden Eagles draft selections
Round	Name	Position	Affiliation	Signed?
1	Tatsuki Koja	Pitcher	Toin University of Yokohama	Yes
2	Haruto Sakai	Pitcher	Takigawa Daini High School	Yes
3	Hinata Naoki	Pitcher	Tokai University Sugao High School	Yes
4	Jumil Rikai Waters	Infielder	Nihon Wellness Okinawa High School	Yes
5	Takuma Matsuda	Pitcher	Osaka Sangyo University	Yes
6	Daisuke Nakajima	Outfielder	Aoyama Gakuin University	Yes
7	Seiya Ouchi	Pitcher	Nihon Wellness Miyagi High School	Yes
8	Takumi Aono	Infielder	Himi High School	Yes
