= 2023 Pacific League Climax Series =

Japanese baseball series

First stage
Team (Wins)		Manager	Season
Chiba Lotte Marines (2)		Masato Yoshii	70–68–5 (.507), 15½ GB
Fukuoka SoftBank Hawks (1)		Hiroshi Fujimoto	71–69–3 (.507), 15½ GB
- Dates: October 14–16

Final stage
Team (Wins)		Manager	Season
Orix Buffaloes (4)		Satoshi Nakajima	86–53–4 (.619), 15½ GA
Chiba Lotte Marines (1)		Masato Yoshii	70–68–5 (.507), 15½ GB
- Dates: October 18–21
- MVP: Yutaro Sugimoto (Orix)

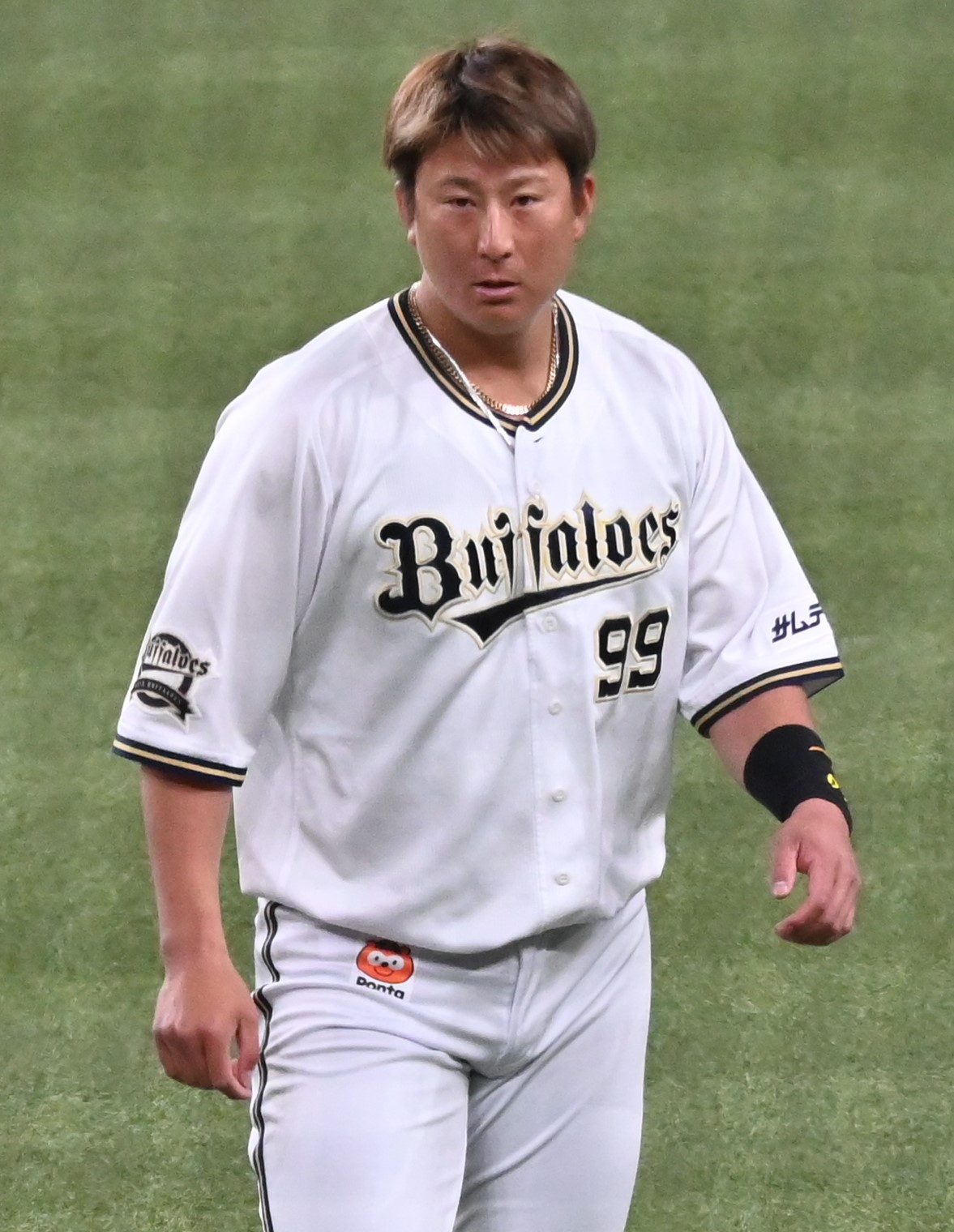

The 2023 Pacific League Climax Series (PLCS) was a set of two consecutive playoff series in Nippon Professional Baseball (NPB). The first stage began on October 14 and the final stage concluded on October 21. The first stage was a best-of-three series between the second-place Chiba Lotte Marines and the third-place Fukuoka SoftBank Hawks. The final stage was a best-of-six with the Orix Buffaloes, the Pacific League champion, being awarded a one-win advantage against the Marines, the winner of the first stage. The Buffaloes advanced to the 2023 Japan Series to compete against the Hanshin Tigers, the 2023 Central League Climax Series winner. This is the third straight year that the Orix Buffaloes have won the Climax Series.

== Background ==
For the sixth year in a row, Persol Holdings sponsored the naming rights for the Pacific League Climax Series, and it was officially known as the "2023 Persol Climax Series PA".

The Orix Buffaloes clinched their third-straight and 15th overall Pacific League pennant on September 20th. Despite slugging outfielder Masataka Yoshida leaving the team in the offseason to play in Major League Baseball, Orix was still able to lead in the standings throughout the majority of the season and clinched the title relatively early compared to the previous two seasons. It was the Buffaloes third three-peat in its history, its first since 1975–1978 when they won four straight as the Braves. It was the first three consecutive Pacific League championships since the Seibu Lions won five straight between 1990 and 1994.

The race for the second and third Climax Series spots came down to the end of the season. The Fukuoka SoftBank Hawks clinched a playoff berth on October 7th, however the seeding and the final team wasn't decided until the last game of the season between the Chiba Lotte Marines and the Tohoku Rakuten Golden Eagles. With the final rescheduled regular-season game rained out on October 9th, the third- and fourth-placed Marines and Eagles, respectively, played their final game on October 10th. A win for either team would allow that team to qualify for the Climax Series while eliminating the other. Lotte won the game which allowed them to clinch second place in the Pacific League, bump SoftBank to third place and eliminate Rakuten entirely.

== First stage ==
Intra-league teams play 25 games against each other during the regular season. The Marines and the Hawks split the season series 12–12–1. The two teams had met in the postseason five times prior to this year, with the Marines only winning two of the five series.

=== Summary ===
Chiba Lotte Marines won the series, 2–1.

Game	Date	Score	Location	Time	Attendance
1	October 14	Fukuoka SoftBank Hawks – 2, Chiba Lotte Marines – 8	Zozo Marine Stadium	3:02	29,126
2	October 15	Fukuoka SoftBank Hawks – 3, Chiba Lotte Marines – 1	Zozo Marine Stadium	3:23	29,147
3	October 16	Fukuoka SoftBank Hawks – 3, Chiba Lotte Marines – 4 (10)	Zozo Marine Stadium	4:18	29,050

=== Game 1 ===
Saturday, October 14, 2023, 6:01 pm (JST) at Zozo Marine Stadium in Chiba, Chiba Prefecture
Team	1	2	3	4	5	6	7	8	9	R	H	E
SoftBank	0	0	0	0	0	2	0	0	0	2	4	1
Lotte	2	0	2	0	0	3	0	1	X	8	9	0
WP: Toshiya Nakamura (1–0) LP: Carter Stewart (0–1); Home runs: SOF: Yuki Yanagita (1); LOT: Takashi Ogino (1), Gregory Polanco (1); Attendance: 29,126; Boxscore

=== Game 2 ===
Sunday, October 15, 2023, 6:00 pm (JST) at Zozo Marine Stadium in Chiba, Chiba Prefecture
Team	1	2	3	4	5	6	7	8	9	R	H	E
SoftBank	1	0	2	0	0	0	0	0	0	3	8	0
Lotte	1	0	0	0	0	0	0	0	0	1	6	1
WP: Kohei Arihara (1–0) LP: Yuji Nishino (0–1) Sv: Roberto Osuna (1); Attendance: 29,147; Boxscore

=== Game 3 ===
Monday, October 16, 2023, 6:00 pm (JST) at Zozo Marine Stadium in Chiba, Chiba Prefecture
Team	1	2	3	4	5	6	7	8	9	10	R	H	E
SoftBank	0	0	0	0	0	0	0	0	0	3	3	8	0
Lotte	0	0	0	0	0	0	0	0	0	4X	4	8	0
WP: Koshiro Sakamoto (1–0) LP: Ryosuke Otsu (0–1); Home runs: SOF: None; LOT: Yudai Fujioka; Attendance: 29,050

== Final stage ==
The championship advanced the Buffaloes directly to the final stage of the Climax Series to host the Marines, the eventual winner of the first stage. In the season series, Orix came out on top 15–8–2 and finished 15.5 games ahead of Lotte. The series is the second time the two teams have met in the Climax Series, the other time being the final stage of the 2021 PLCS that Orix won.

=== Summary ===
Orix Buffaloes won the series, 4–1*.

Game	Date	Score	Location	Time	Attendance
1	October 18	Chiba Lotte Marines – 5, Orix Buffaloes – 8	Kyocera Dome	3:09	35,930
2	October 19	Chiba Lotte Marines – 6, Orix Buffaloes – 5	Kyocera Dome	3:22	33,634
3	October 20	Chiba Lotte Marines – 0, Orix Buffaloes – 2	Kyocera Dome	3:09	35,943
4	October 21	Chiba Lotte Marines – 2, Orix Buffaloes – 3	Kyocera Dome	2:32	35,804

* The Pacific League regular season champion is given a one-game advantage in the final stage.

=== Game 1 ===
Wednesday, October 18, 2023, 6:01 pm JST at Kyocera Dome in Osaka, Osaka Prefecture
Team	1	2	3	4	5	6	7	8	9	R	H	E
Lotte	3	0	0	0	0	1	1	0	0	5	11	0
Orix	0	0	0	3	0	4	0	1	X	8	9	0
WP: Yoshinobu Yamamoto (1–0) LP: Toshiya Nakamura (0–1) Sv: Yoshihisa Hirano (1); Attendance: 35,930; Boxscore

=== Game 2 ===
Thursday, October 19, 2023, 6:01 pm JST at Kyocera Dome in Osaka, Osaka Prefecture
Team	1	2	3	4	5	6	7	8	9	R	H	E
Lotte	1	0	0	0	0	3	0	0	2	6	5	0
Orix	3	0	0	0	0	0	2	0	0	5	9	0
WP: Taiki Tojo (1–0) LP: Taisuke Yamaoka (0–1) Sv: Naoya Masuda (1); Home runs: LOT: None; ORX: Leandro Cedeño (1); Attendance: 33,634; Boxscore

=== Game 3 ===
Friday, October 20, 2023, 6:01 pm JST at Kyocera Dome in Osaka, Osaka Prefecture
Team	1	2	3	4	5	6	7	8	9	R	H	E
Lotte	0	0	0	0	0	0	0	0	0	0	6	1
Orix	0	0	0	0	0	0	0	2	X	2	8	0
WP: Yuki Udagawa (1–0) LP: Takahiro Nishimura (0–1) Sv: Yoshihisa Hirano (2); Attendance: 35,943; Boxscore

=== Game 4 ===
Saturday, October 21, 2023, 6:00 pm JST at Kyocera Dome in Osaka, Osaka Prefecture
Team	1	2	3	4	5	6	7	8	9	R	H	E
Lotte	0	0	0	0	0	0	0	1	1	2	7	0
Orix	2	0	0	0	0	1	0	0	X	3	9	0
WP: Hiroya Miyagi (1–0) LP: Atsuki Taneichi (0–1) Sv: Yoshihisa Hirano (3); Home runs: LOT: Kyota Fujiwara (1), Gregory Polanco (1); ORX: Tomoya Mori (1); Attendance: 35,804; Boxscore
