= Takumi Ohshiro =

Japanese baseball player (born 1993)

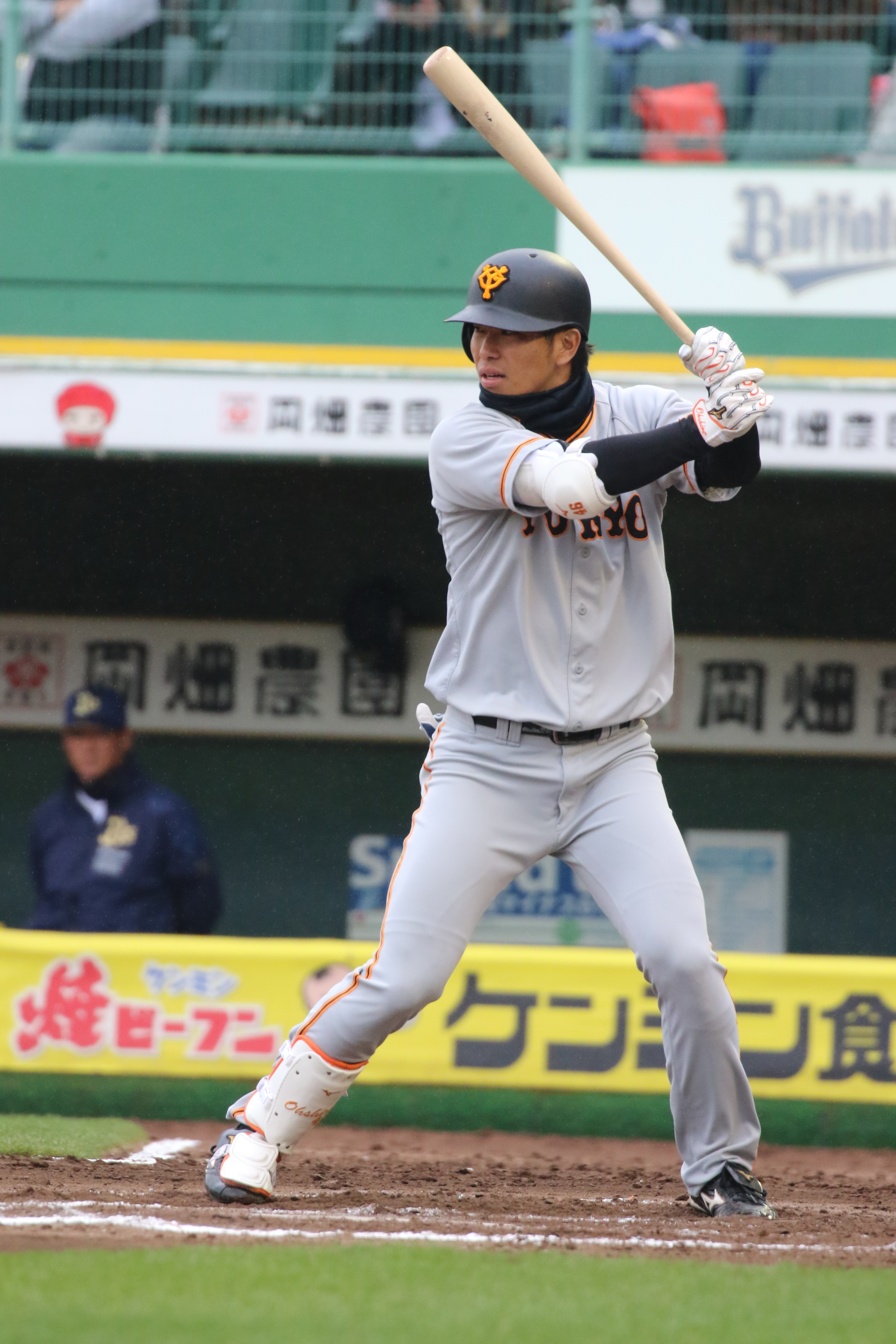
- Ohshiro with the Yomiuri Giants

Yomiuri Giants – No. 24
- Catcher / Infielder
- Born: February 11, 1993 (age 33); Naha, Okinawa, Japan
- Bats: Left Throws: Right

NPB debut
- March 30, 2018, for the Yomiuri Giants

NPB statistics (through 2025 season)
- Batting average: .259
- Home runs: 65
- Runs batted in: 260
- Stats at Baseball Reference

Teams
- Yomiuri Giants (2018–present)

Career highlights and awards
- NPB All-Star (2023); 2× Best Nine Award (2020, 2023)
Medals
Men's baseball
Representing Japan
World Baseball Classic
| Gold medal – first place | 2023 Miami | Team |

Takumi Ohshiro (大城 卓三, Ohshiro Takumi; born February 11, 1993) is a Japanese professional baseball catcher and infielder for the Yomiuri Giants of Nippon Professional Baseball (NPB).

== Career ==
On November 16, 2018, he was selected for the Yomiuri Giants roster at the 2018 MLB Japan All-Star Series exhibition game against MLB All-Stars.

On June 3, 2020, it was announced that Ohshiro and Giants teammate Hayato Sakamoto both tested positive for COVID-19.

On June 19, 2025, Ohshiro hit a solo home run off of Hokkaido Nippon-Ham Fighters pitcher Koki Kitayama, breaking up a perfect game that Kitayama had pitched until the bottom of the ninth inning, with one out.
