= Toshiki Abe =

Japanese baseball player (born 1989)

Toshiki Abe 阿部 寿樹
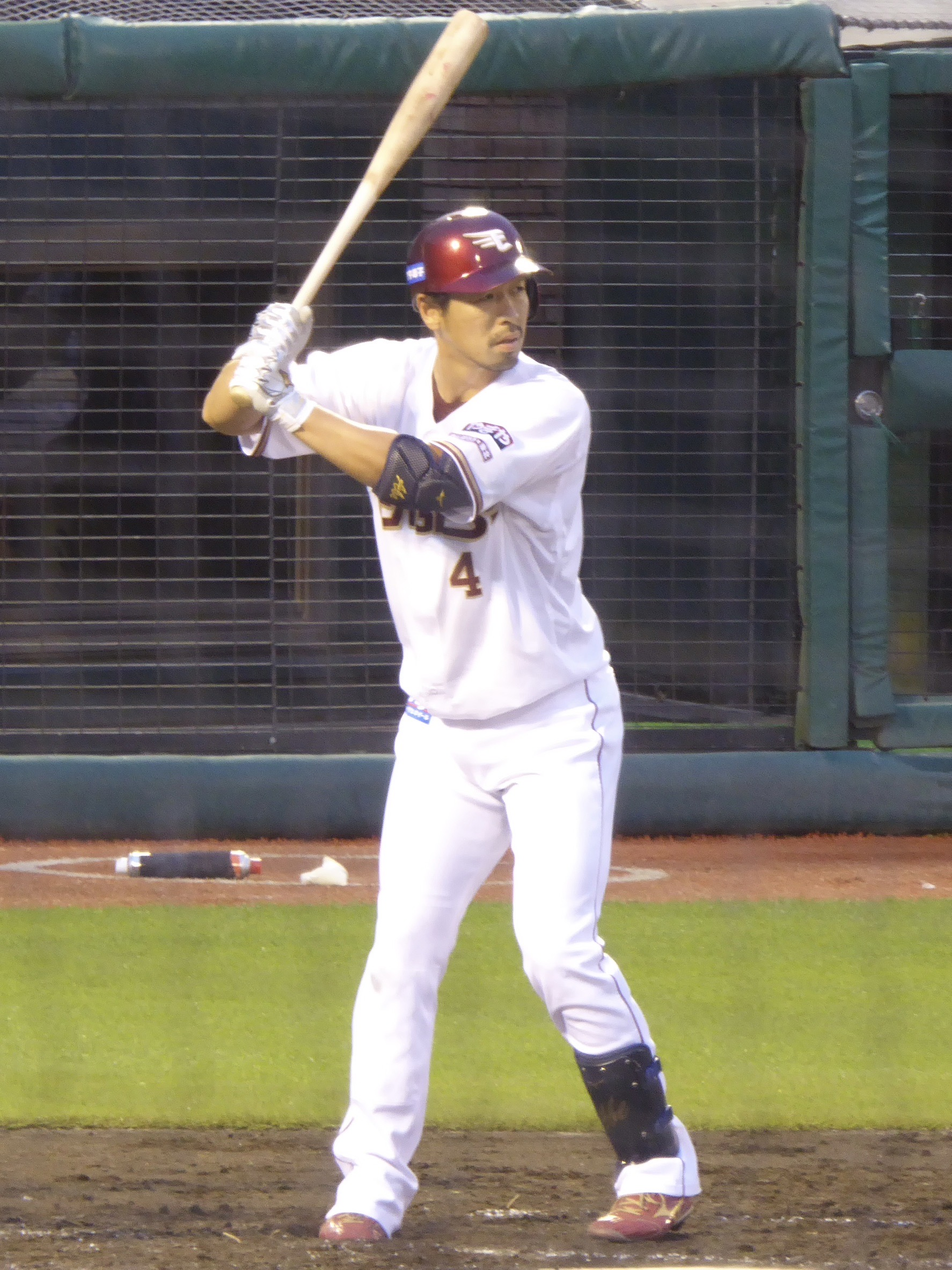

Chunichi Dragons – No. 48
- Infielder
- Born: December 3, 1989 (age 36); Ichinoseki, Iwate, Japan
- Bats: Right Throws: Right

NPB debut
- August 11, 2016, for the Chunichi Dragons

Career statistics (through July 24, 2026)
- Batting average: .256
- Home runs: 54
- Runs batted in: 286
- Stats at Baseball Reference

Teams
- Chunichi Dragons (2016–2022); Tohoku Rakuten Golden Eagles (2023–2025); Chunichi Dragons (2026–)

Toshiki Abe (阿部 寿樹, Abe Toshiki; born December 3, 1989) is a Japanese professional baseball infielder for the Chunichi Dragons of Nippon Professional Baseball (NPB). He has previously played in NPB for the Tohoku Rakuten Golden Eagles.

== Early career ==
Abe started playing rubber-ball baseball in elementary school and continued at junior high school.

He experienced victory in the Iwate Prefectural and Tohoku regional tournaments with his high school Ichinoseki Daiichi Senior High School but did not make an appearance at Koshien.

In his freshman year at Meiji University, Abe started on the bench while in his junior year he became a regular at third base. In Fall of his senior year he contributed to the school's first league victory in 15 years.

He was employed by Honda and did wiring work while playing baseball for the company team. In his second year with the company he made an appearance in the industrial league Japan championships.

On 22 October 2015, Abe was selected as the 5th draft pick for the Chunichi Dragons at the 2015 NPB Draft and on 26 November signed a provisional contract with a \50,000,000 sign-on bonus and a \10,000,000 yearly salary.

== Professional career ==
=== Chunichi Dragons ===
On 11 August, Abe made his first team debut as a pinch-runner against the Tokyo Yakult Swallows in a 2-8 loss. He then hit his first home run and RBI on 14 September against the Yomiuri Giants at Nagoya Dome. From his debut, Abe stayed with the first team until the end of the season making 24 appearances with a .170 batting average filing in at short-stop, third and second base.

In 2017, Abe was able to play in 21 games with the top team while hitting a slash line of .244/.309/.333 on the farm over 85 games.

In 2018, Abe once again had a limited role playing mostly as a pinch-hitter and defensive replacement in 18 games with the top team while in the fall he started training to play in the outfield. His results on the farm were less impactful than the previous season hitting a clip of .212/.296/.318 with 5 homeruns over 82 games.

From spring training, Abe was marked for a starting role alongside fellow utility Naomichi Donoue and appeared in the opening day line-up of the 2019 season at second base. On the April 5, Abe hit his first homerun since his rookie season against the Tokyo Yakult Swallows. Abe was a UZR leader at second base for the Dragons leading the, batting .291 and a .742 OPS.

=== Tohoku Rakuten Golden Eagles ===
On November 19, 2022, Abe was traded to the Tohoku Rakuten Golden Eagles in exchange for Hideaki Wakui.

On September 29, 2025, Abe was non-tendered and became a free agent.

=== Chunichi Dragons (second stint) ===
On December 5, 2025, the Chunichi Dragons announced the re-signing of Abe.

== Career statistics ==
Nippon Professional Baseball
Year	Age	Team	G	AB	R	H	2B	3B	HR	TB	RBI	SB	AVG	OBP	SLG	OPS
2016	26	Chunichi	25	49	2	9	1	0	1	13	4	1	.184	.212	.265	.477
2017	27	Chunichi	21	41	33	11	1	0	0	12	2	1	.268	.333	.293	.626
2018	28	Chunichi	18	23	1	5	3	0	0	8	4	0	.217	.308	.348	.656
2019	29	Chunichi	129	447	51	130	24	3	7	181	59	1	.291	.337	.405	.742
2020	30	Chunichi	115	459	44	108	25	0	13	172	61	2	.257	.306	.409	.715
2021	31	Chunichi	66	215	18	45	10	0	5	70	16	0	.209	.271	.326	.597
2022	32	Chunichi	133	486	44	131	31	2	9	193	57	3	.270	.338	.397	.735
2023	33	Rakuten	78	216	16	55	17	1	4	86	24	0	.255	.340	.398	.738
2024	34	Rakuten	78	229	19	52	13	2	9	96	32	0	.227	.292	.419	.711
2025	35	Rakuten	43	105	11	23	5	1	3	39	8	1	.219	.352	.371	.723
**Career**			706	2232	209	569	130	9	51	870	267	9	.255	.319	.390	.708

Bold indicates league leader; statistics current as of December 8, 2025
