= Mao Itoh =

Japanese baseball player (born 2000)

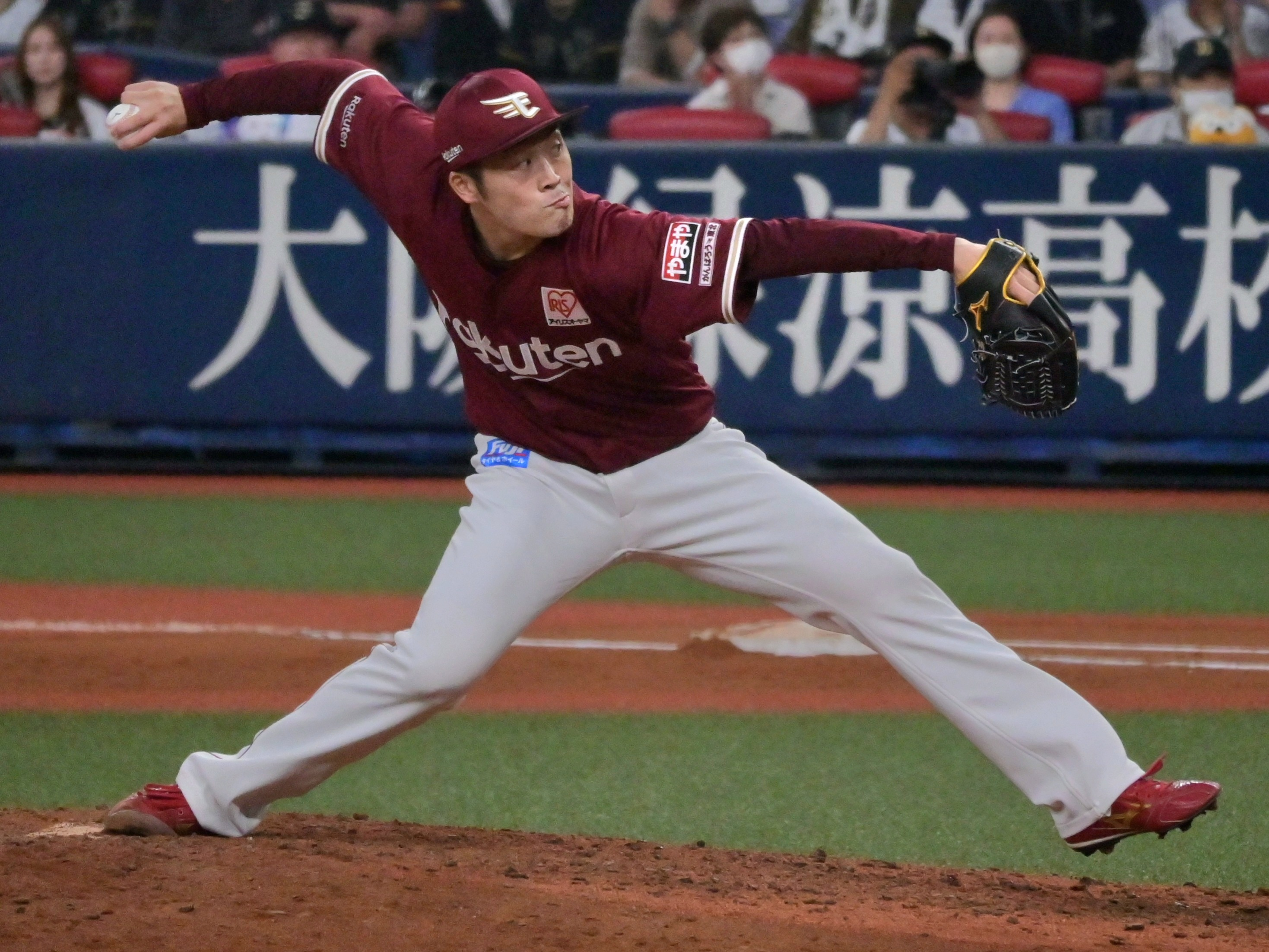

Chunichi Dragons – No. 32
- Pitcher
- Born: November 19, 2000 (age 25); Kitakata, Fukushima, Japan
- Bats: Left Throws: Right

NPB debut
- April 1, 2023, for the Tohoku Rakuten Golden Eagles

NPB statistics (through July 25, 2026)
- Win–loss record: 2-1
- ERA: 2.91
- Strikeouts: 28

Teams
- Tohoku Rakuten Golden Eagles (2023–(2024); Chunichi Dragons (2025-Present)

Mao Itoh (伊藤 茉央, Itō Mao; born November 19, 2000 in Kitakata, Fukushima, Japan) is a professional Japanese baseball player. He plays pitcher for the Chunichi Dragons. He moved via the active player draft from the Tohoku Rakuten Golden Eagles.
