= Soichiro Yamazaki =

Japanese baseball player (born 1998)

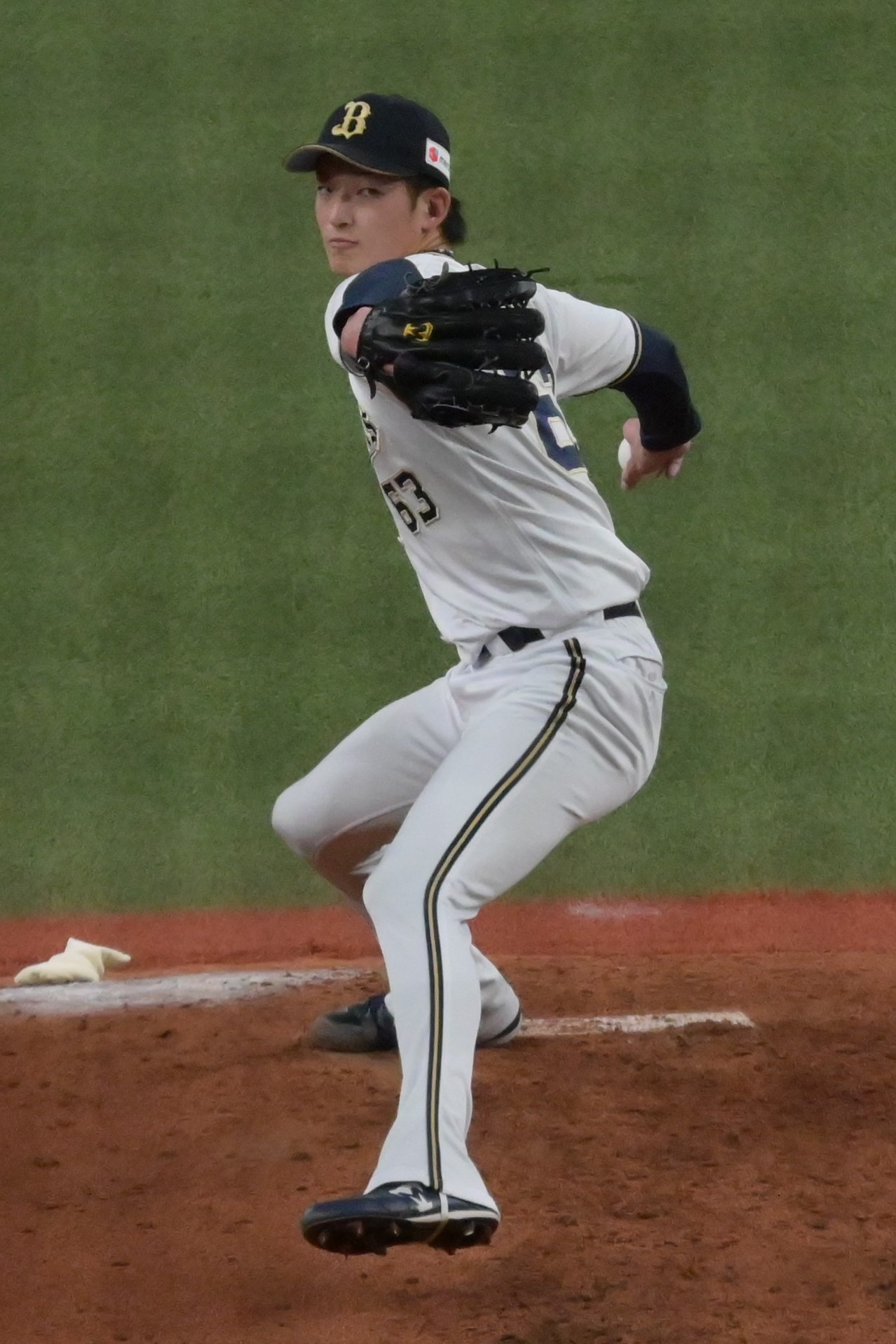

Orix Buffaloes – No. 63
- Pitcher
- Born: June 15, 1998 (age 27); Kaga, Ishikawa Prefecture, Japan
- Bats: Right Throws: Right

NPB debut
- May 1, 2021, for the Orix Buffaloes

Career statistics (through 2024 season)
- Win–loss record: 3-6
- Earned Run Average: 2.76
- Strikeouts: 120
- Saves: 10
- Holds: 33
- Stats at Baseball Reference

Teams
- Orix Buffaloes (2017–present)

Career highlights and awards
- Japan Series champion (2022); NPB All-Star (2023)
Medals
Men's baseball
Representing Japan
World Baseball Classic
Gold medal – first place	2023 Miami	Team

Soichiro Yamazaki (山﨑 颯一郎, Yamazaki Soichiro; born June 15, 1998 in Kaga, Ishikawa, Japan) is a professional Japanese baseball player. He plays pitcher for the Orix Buffaloes.
