= Yuki Matsui =

Japanese baseball player (born 1995)

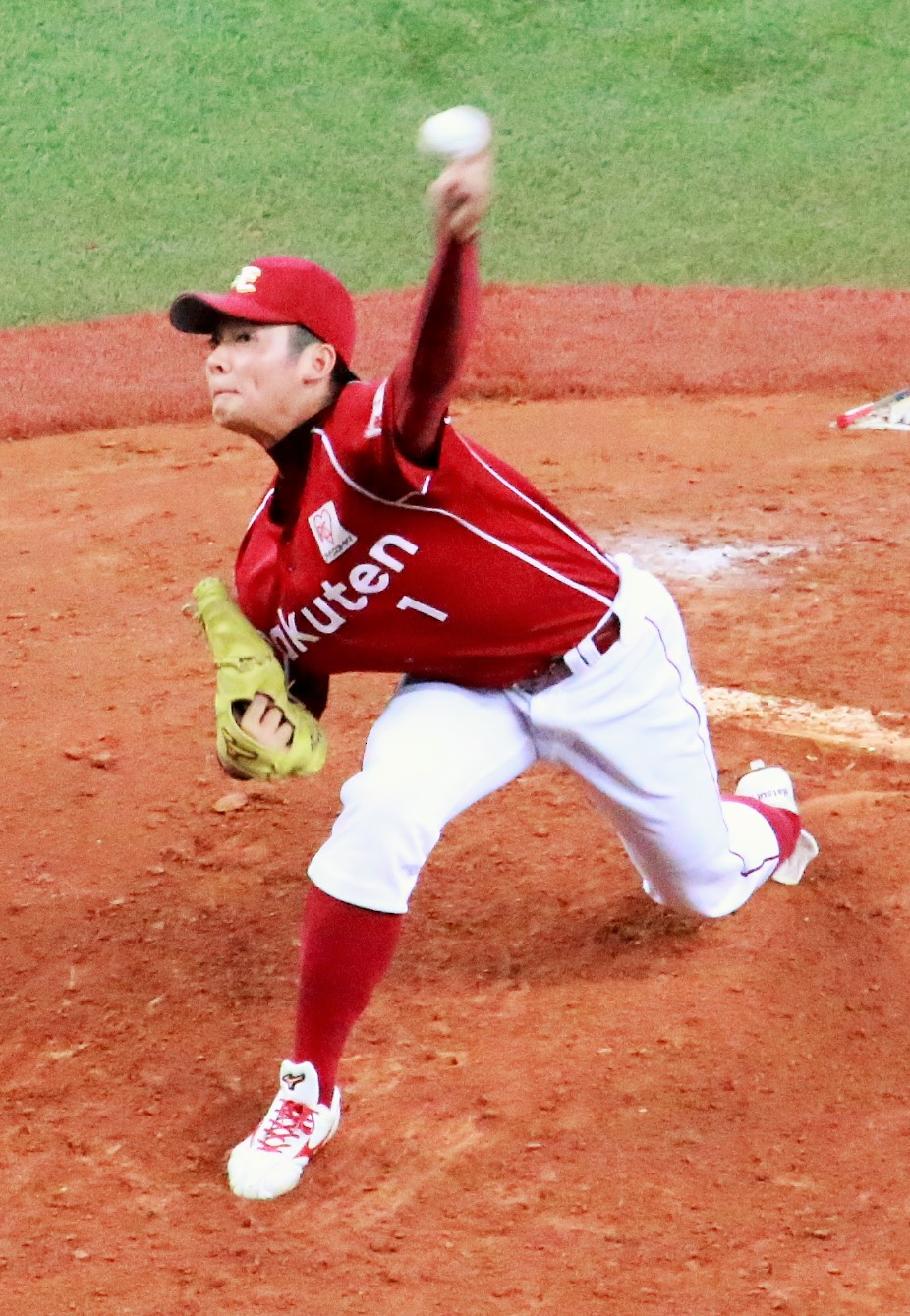
- Matsui in 2014 with the Tohoku Rakuten Golden Eagles

San Diego Padres – No. 1
- Pitcher
- Born: October 30, 1995 (age 30); Aoba-ku, Yokohama, Kanagawa, Japan
- Bats: Left Throws: Left

Professional debut
- NPB: April 2, 2014, for the Tohoku Rakuten Golden Eagles
- MLB: March 20, 2024, for the San Diego Padres

NPB statistics (through 2023 season)
- Win–loss record: 25-46
- Earned run average: 2.40
- Strikeouts: 860
- Saves: 236

MLB statistics (through 2026 season)
- Win–loss record: 12–4
- Earned run average: 3.17
- Strikeouts: 198
- Stats at Baseball Reference

Teams
- Tohoku Rakuten Golden Eagles (2014–2023); San Diego Padres (2024–present)

Career highlights and awards
- 5× NPB All-Star (2015, 2017, 2019, 2021, 2022); 3× Pacific League Saves Leader (2019, 2022, 2023)
Medals
Men's baseball
Representing Japan
World Baseball Classic
Gold medal – first place	2023 Miami	Team
18U Baseball World Cup
Silver medal – second place	2013 Taichung	Team
2015 WBSC Premier12
Bronze medal – third place	2015 Tokyo	Team

Yuki Matsui (松井 裕樹, Matsui Yūki; born October 30, 1995) is a Japanese professional baseball pitcher for the San Diego Padres of Major League Baseball (MLB). He previously played in Nippon Professional Baseball (NPB) for the Tohoku Rakuten Golden Eagles from 2014 to 2023.

== Career ==
=== Amateur career ===
As a pitcher for Toko Gakuen High School, he won a 7–0 victory against Imabari-Nishi high school where he racked up 22 strikeouts. Later on, he struck out 19 batters at Koshien Stadium and won a 7–5 game over Joso Gakuin. He also struck out the same amount in 2005, which ranked him along with Yoshinori Toda in 1963.

=== Tohoku Rakuten Golden Eagles ===
In October 2013, five Nippon Professional Baseball (NPB) teams selected Matsui in the 2013 NPB draft. The Tohoku Rakuten Golden Eagles winning the rights to negotiate with him. Matsui signed with the Golden Eagles and made his NPB debut on April 2, 2014.

On October 11, 2023, Matsui had exercised his international free agent rights to be released from the Golden Eagles to seek a Major League Baseball contract.

=== San Diego Padres ===
On December 23, 2023, Matsui signed a five-year contract worth $28 million guaranteed with the San Diego Padres of Major League Baseball. The contract included an opt out after both the third and fourth seasons and an injury clause which would change the fifth and final year of the contract into a $7 million club option in the case of Matsui suffering a "serious elbow injury" during the length of the deal.

== International career ==
Matsui was selected Japan national baseball team at the 2013 18U Baseball World Cup, 2015 exhibition games against Europe, 2015 WBSC Premier12, 2017 World Baseball Classic, and 2023 World Baseball Classic.

On October 10, 2018, Matsui was selected at the 2018 MLB Japan All-Star Series.

Matsui was selected at the 2019 WBSC Premier12 but on October 21, it was announced that he would not participate due to left elbow discomfort.

== Playing style ==
Matsui is a 5-foot-8-inch (1.73 m), 165-pound (75 kg) left-handed pitcher. With an overhand delivery, he throws a fastball averaging 92–93 miles per hour (148–150 km/h) which tops out at 96 miles per hour (154 km/h), a split-finger fastball, and a slider. The splitter is the best off-speed pitch in his arsenal.

== Private life ==
Matsui married actress Anna Ishibashi in 2018. In May 2020, they announced the birth of their first child, a daughter, and on October 14, 2022, Ishibashi gave birth to the couple's second child, a son.
