= Seigi Tanaka =

Japanese baseball player (born 1994)

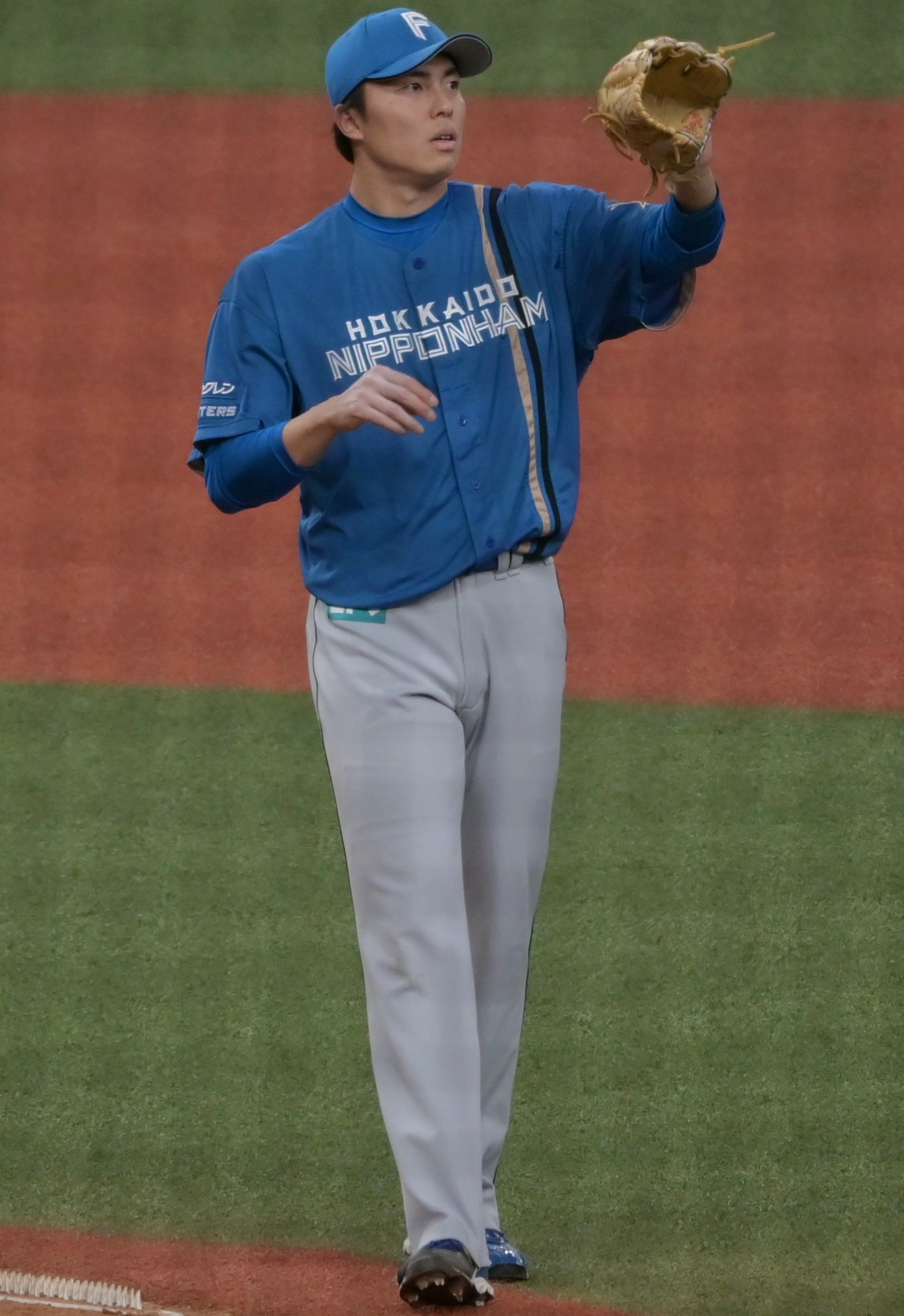

Hokkaido Nippon-Ham Fighters – No. 26
- Pitcher
- Born: July 19, 1994 (age 31); Yokohama, Kanagawa, Japan
- Bats: Right Throws: Right

NPB debut
- April 1, 2018, for the Fukuoka SoftBank Hawks

NPB statistics (through 2025 season)
- Win–loss record: 7–9
- Earned run average: 2.71
- Strikeouts: 176
- Stats at Baseball Reference

Teams
- Fukuoka SoftBank Hawks (2017–2022); Hokkaido Nippon-Ham Fighters (2023–present)

Career highlights and awards
- 3x NPB All-Star (2023–2025)
Medals
Men's baseball
Representing Japan
Haarlem Baseball Week
Silver medal – second place	2014 Haarlem, Netherlands	Team
Baseball at the Summer Universiade
Gold medal – first place	2015, Gwangju, South Korea	Team

Seigi Tanaka (田中 正義, Tanaka Seigi; born July 19, 1994) is a Japanese professional baseball pitcher for the Hokkaido Nippon-Ham Fighters of Nippon Professional Baseball (NPB). He has previously played in NPB for the Fukuoka SoftBank Hawks after being drafted in 2016.

== Early baseball career ==
Tanaka was selected to the Japan national baseball team for 2014 Haarlem Baseball Week and Baseball at the 2015 Summer Universiade while attending Sōka University.

== Professional career ==
=== Fukuoka SoftBank Hawks ===
On October 20, 2016, Tanaka was drafted by the Fukuoka Softbank Hawks first overall pick in the 2016 Nippon Professional Baseball draft.

In 2017 season, Tanaka played in the Western League of NPB's minor leagues and played in informal matches against Shikoku Island League Plus's teams.

On April 1, 2018, Tanaka pitched his debut game against the Orix Buffaloes as a relief pitcher. In 2018 season, he pitched in 10 games.

In 2019 season, Tanaka hurt his right shoulder in spring training and spent 4 months in rehabilitation. And he pitched only one game.

In 2020 season, Tanaka hurt his right elbow in spring training and spent the season in rehabilitation. As a result, he had no chance to pitch in the Pacific League.

On June 27, 2021, Tanaka pitched in the Pacific League for the first time in two years against the Tohoku Rakuten Golden Eagles. In 2021 season, he finished the regular season with a 18 Games pitched, a 0–0 Win–loss record, a 2.16 ERA, a one Holds, and a 14 strikeouts in 16.2 innings.

In 2022 season, he injured his right shoulder in the preseason game on March 20, and the effect delayed his start in the Pacific League on August 14. He finished the regular season with a 5 Games pitched, a 0–0 Win–loss record, a 0.00 ERA, a one Holds, and a 6 strikeouts in 5 innings.

=== Hokkaido Nippon-Ham Fighters ===
On January 12, 2023, Tanaka was traded to the Hokkaido Nippon-Ham Fighters as compensation for Kensuke Kondo, who exercised his right to free agency and moved to the Fukuoka SoftBank Hawks.
