= Taiki Tojo =

Japanese baseball player

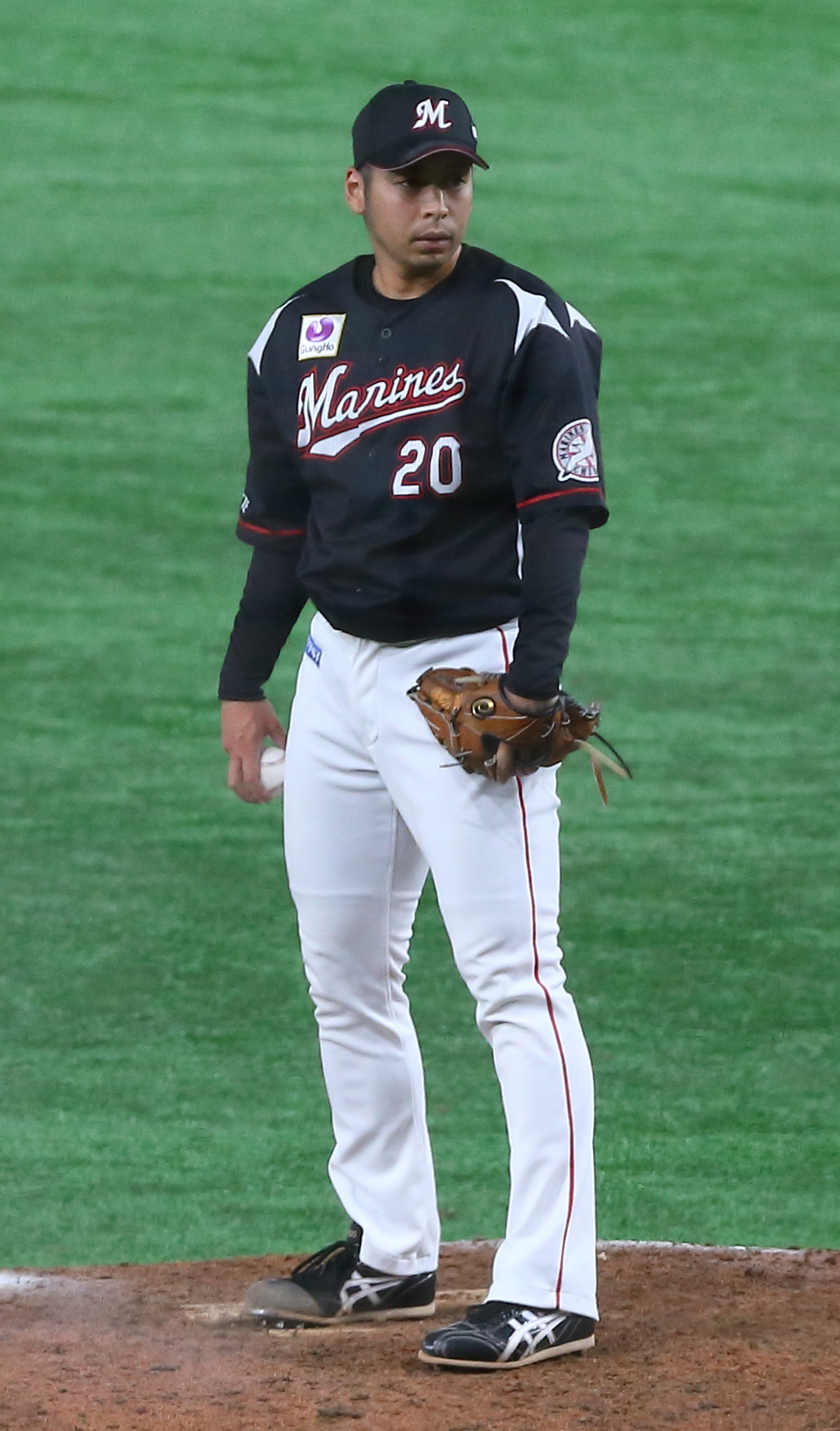
- Pitcher
- Born: August 15, 1991 (age 34); Fujisawa, Kanagawa, Japan
- Bats: Right Throws: Right

NPB debut
- May 1, 2016, for the Chiba Lotte Marines

NPB statistics (through 2023 season)
- Win–loss record: 6-5
- Earned run average: 3.83
- Strikeouts: 185
- Saves: 1
- Holds: 58
- Stats at Baseball Reference

Teams
- Chiba Lotte Marines (2016–2023)

Career highlights and awards
- 1× NPB All-Star (2022)

Taiki Tojo (東條 大樹, Tōjō Taiki; born August 15, 1991 in Fujisawa, Kanagawa, Japan) is a former Nippon Professional Baseball pitcher who played for the Chiba Lotte Marines from 2016 to 2023.
