= Atsuki Taneichi =

Japanese baseball player (born 1998)

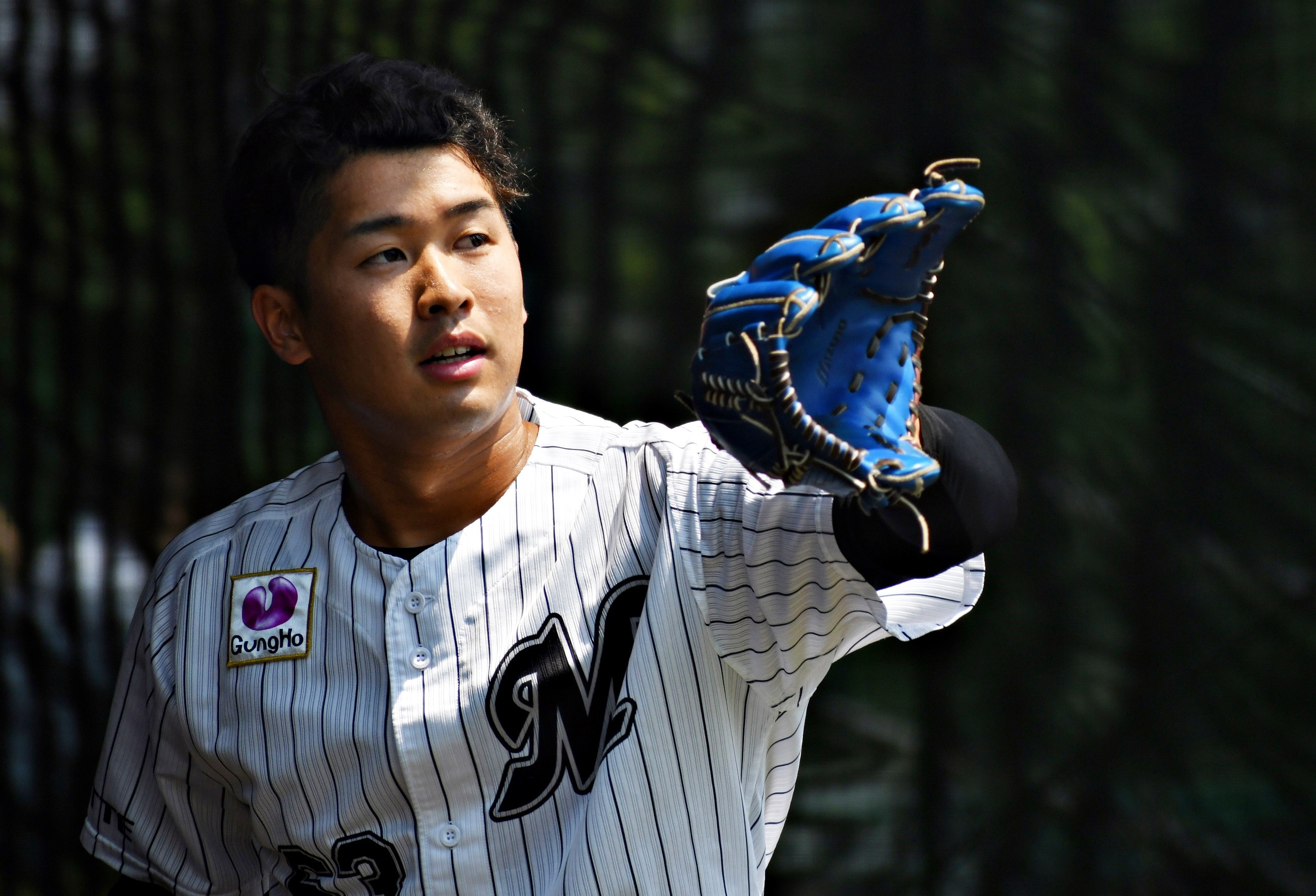

Chiba Lotte Marines – No. 16
- Pitcher
- Born: September 7, 1998 (age 27); Misawa, Aomori, Japan
- Bats: Right Throws: Right

NPB debut
- October 21, 2018, for the Chiba Lotte Marines

Career statistics (through 2025 season)
- Win–loss record: 37–31
- Earned run average: 3.30
- Strikeouts: 672
- Stats at Baseball Reference

Teams
- Chiba Lotte Marines (2017–present)

Career highlights and awards
- NPB All-Star (2023)
Medals
Men's baseball
Representing Japan
U-23 Baseball World Cup
Silver medal – second place	2018 Barranquilla	Team

Atsuki Taneichi (種市 篤暉, Taneichi Atsuki; born September 7, 1998) is a professional Japanese baseball player. He plays pitcher for the Chiba Lotte Marines.

== Professional career ==
Taneichi's professional career began when he was drafted by the Chiba Lotte Marines in the sixth round of the 2016 NPB draft. He spent his rookie year honing his skills in the NPB Farm Leagues. He represented Japan in the 2018 U-23 Baseball World Cup. He underwent surgery that sidelined him for most of the 2021 season. He was selected as an NPB All-Star in 2023.
