= Takahiro Nishimura =

Japanese baseball player (born 1993)

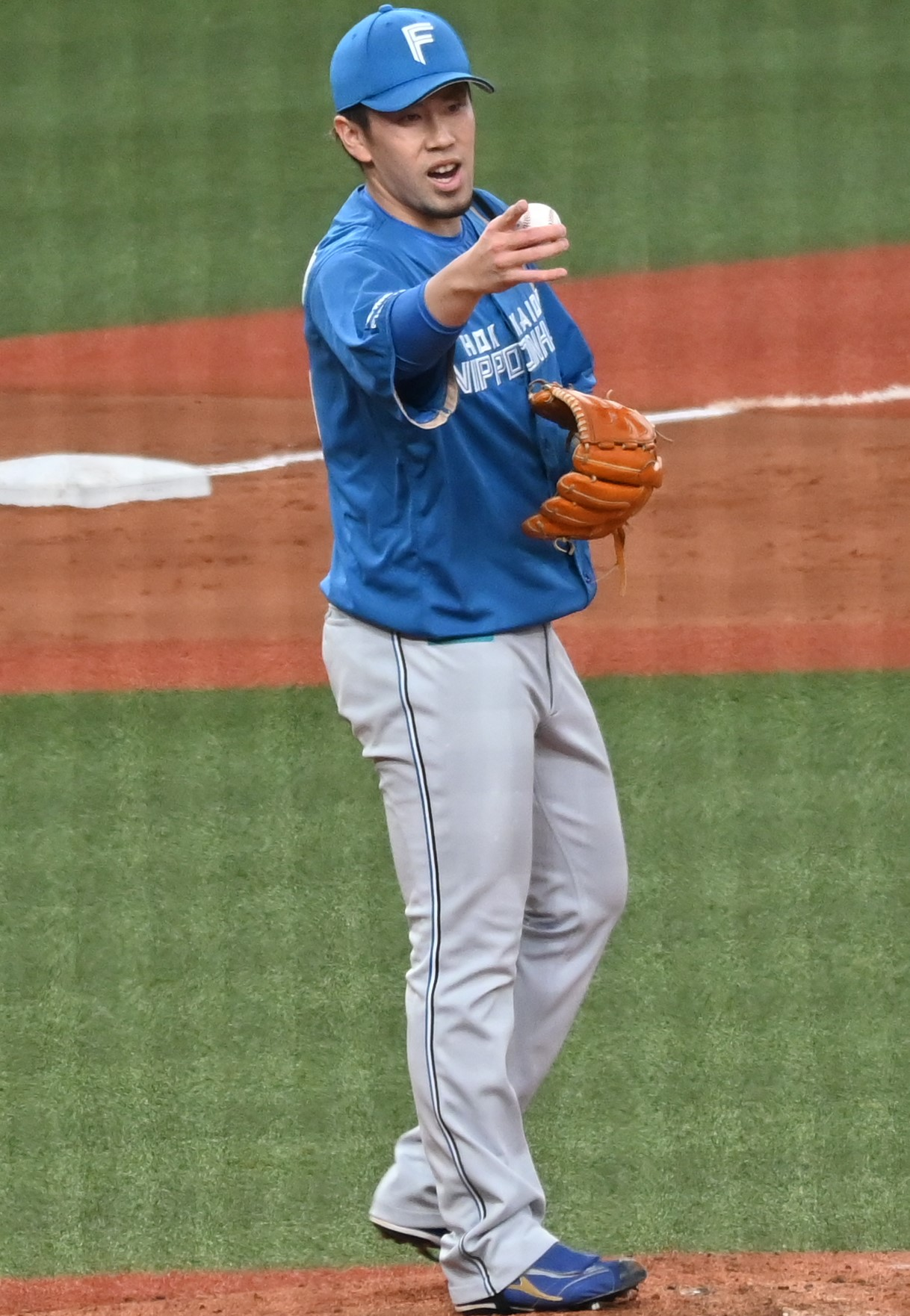
- Pitcher
- Born: May 6, 1993 (age 32); Wakayama, Wakayama, Japan
- Batted: Right Threw: Right

NPB debut
- March 30, 2018, for the Hokkaido Nippon-Ham Fighters

Last NPB appearance
- May 21, 2025, for the Chiba Lotte Marines

Career statistics
- Win–loss record: 7–2
- Earned run average: 3.77
- Strikeouts: 223
- Saves: 1
- Holds: 33
- Stats at Baseball Reference

Teams
- Hokkaido Nippon-Ham Fighters (2018–2022); Chiba Lotte Marines (2023–2025)

Takahiro Nishimura (西村 天裕, Nishimura Takahiro; born May 5, 1993, in Wakayama, Wakayama, Japan) is a professional Japanese baseball pitcher for the Chiba Lotte Marines of Nippon Professional Baseball (NPB). He previously played in NPB for the Hokkaido Nippon-Ham Fighters.

== Career ==
On March 30, 2018, Nishimura made his Nippon Professional Baseball (NPB) debut for the Hokkaido Nippon-Ham Fighters.

On March 5, 2023, Nishimura was traded to the Chiba Lotte Marines in exchange for infielder Koki Fukuda.
