= Yoshihisa Hirano (baseball) =

Japanese baseball player (born 1984)

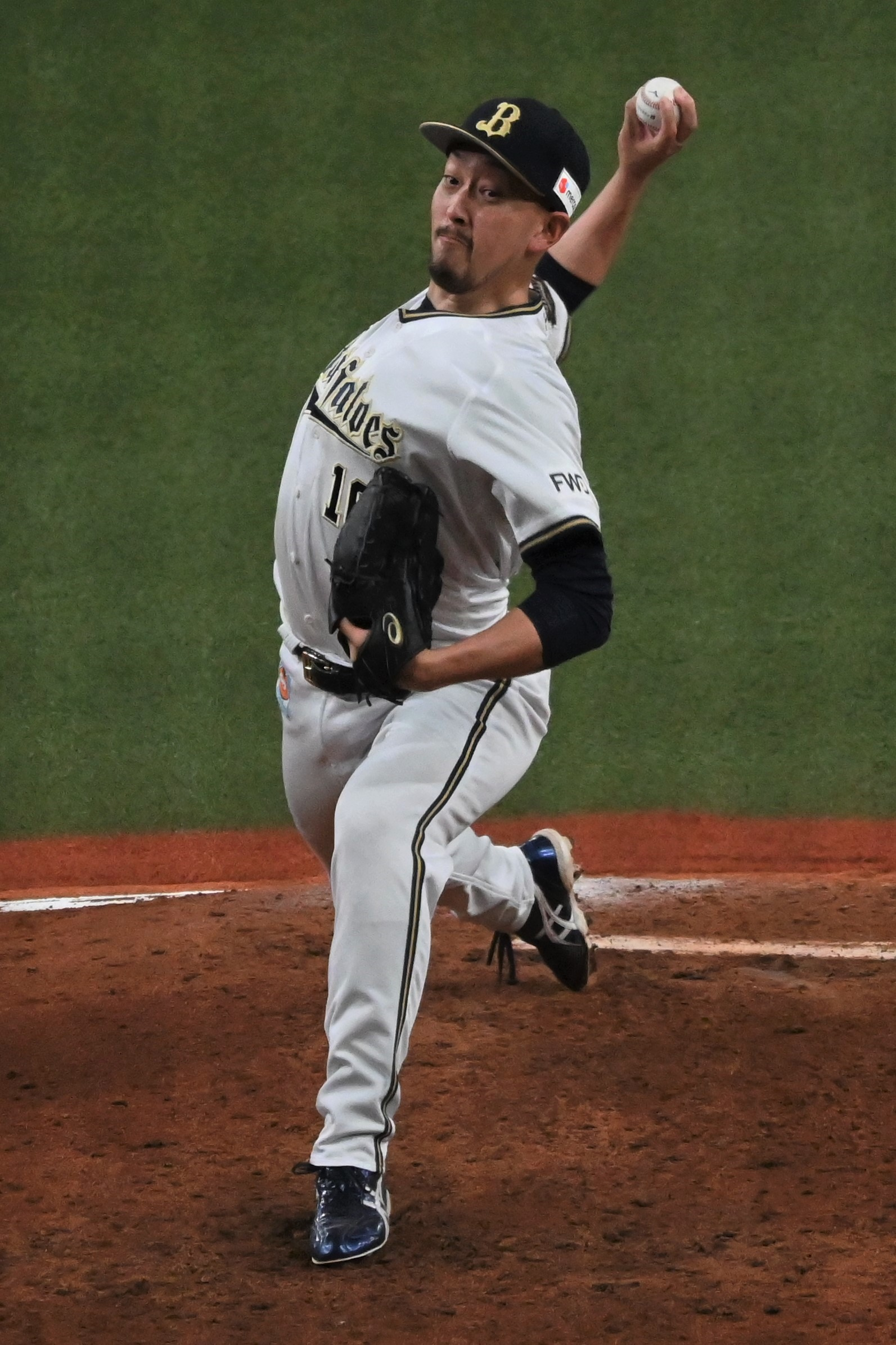
- Hirano with the Orix Buffaloes in 2021

Orix Buffaloes – No. 16
- Pitcher
- Born: March 8, 1984 (age 42); Kyoto, Japan
- Bats: Right Throws: Right

Professional debut
- NPB: March 26, 2006, for the Orix Buffaloes
- MLB: March 29, 2018, for the Arizona Diamondbacks

NPB statistics (through August 21, 2026)
- Win–loss record: 56-78
- Earned run average: 2.98
- Strikeouts: 1,000
- Saves: 250
- Holds: 156

MLB statistics (through 2020 season)
- Win–loss record: 9–9
- Earned run average: 3.69
- Strikeouts: 131
- Stats at Baseball Reference

Teams
- As player: Orix Buffaloes (2006–2007, 2009–2017, 2021–present); Arizona Diamondbacks (2018–2019); Seattle Mariners (2020); As coach: Orix Buffaloes (2026–present)

Career highlights and awards
- NPB: 5× All-Star (2006, 2010–2013); Pacific League Saves Leader (2014); Middle Reliever of the Year (2011); Japan Series Champion (2022); 250 saves (2023); Meikyukai Member (on 2023)

Yoshihisa Hirano (平野 佳寿, Hirano Yoshihisa) (born March 8, 1984) is a Japanese professional baseball pitcher for the Orix Buffaloes of Nippon Professional Baseball (NPB). He has previously played in Major League Baseball (MLB) for the Arizona Diamondbacks and Seattle Mariners.

Hirano is a right-handed pitcher with a three-quarters delivery. As a reliever, he throws a fastball topping out at mid-90s and a forkball as his primary pitches.

== Career ==
=== Orix Buffaloes ===
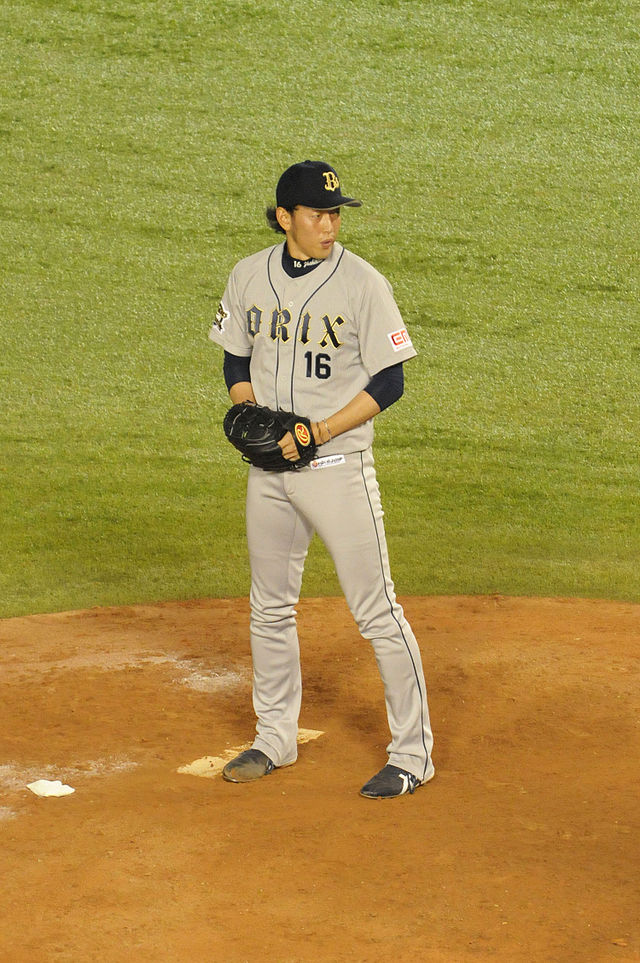
Hirano with the Orix Buffaloes in 2014

The Orix Buffaloes selected him with the first overall selection in the 2005 Nippon Professional Baseball draft. Hirano made his professional debut in 2006, pitching 172 1/3 innings of 3.81 ERA ball. The next year, Hirano logged an 8-13 record and 3.72 ERA in 27 appearances with the team. In 2008, Hirano did not make an appearance with the major club, pitching in 6 games for Orix's minor league club. He returned to Orix in 2009, pitching to a 3–12 record and 4.72 ERA in 20 appearances. In 2010, Hirano improved on his performance from the previous year, recording a stellar 7–2 record and 1.67 ERA with 101 strikeouts in 80 2/3 innings of work. He continued his success in 2011, logging a 6–2 record and 1.94 ERA in 83 2/3 innings of work. He also won NPB’s best middle reliever award in 2011. His fine work continued in 2012, with an ERA of 2.15 paired with a record of 7–4 in 70 appearances. Hirano carried his success into 2013 as well, pitching to a 1.87 ERA with 71 strikeouts in 62 2/3 innings pitched for Orix. He was not as successful in 2014, but still had a solid year, registering a 3.43 ERA with 70 strikeouts in 60 1/3 innings pitched. Hirano also led the Pacific League in 2014 in saves, with 40. In 2015, Hirano posted a 3.82 ERA with 43 strikeouts in 33 innings across 33 appearances for the team. In 2016, Hirano had a strong year, posting a 4–4 record and 1.92 ERA in 58 appearances for Orix. During the 2017 season, his last before signing with a Major League Baseball team, the right-handed Hirano saved 29 games and pitched to a 2.67 ERA with 47 strikeouts in 57 1/3 innings.

Hirano pitched 12 seasons of professional ball in Japan with Orix. He became a full-time reliever in 2010 and was the Buffaloes closer from 2012–2017. In his time with the Buffaloes, he recorded a total of 156 saves.

=== Arizona Diamondbacks ===
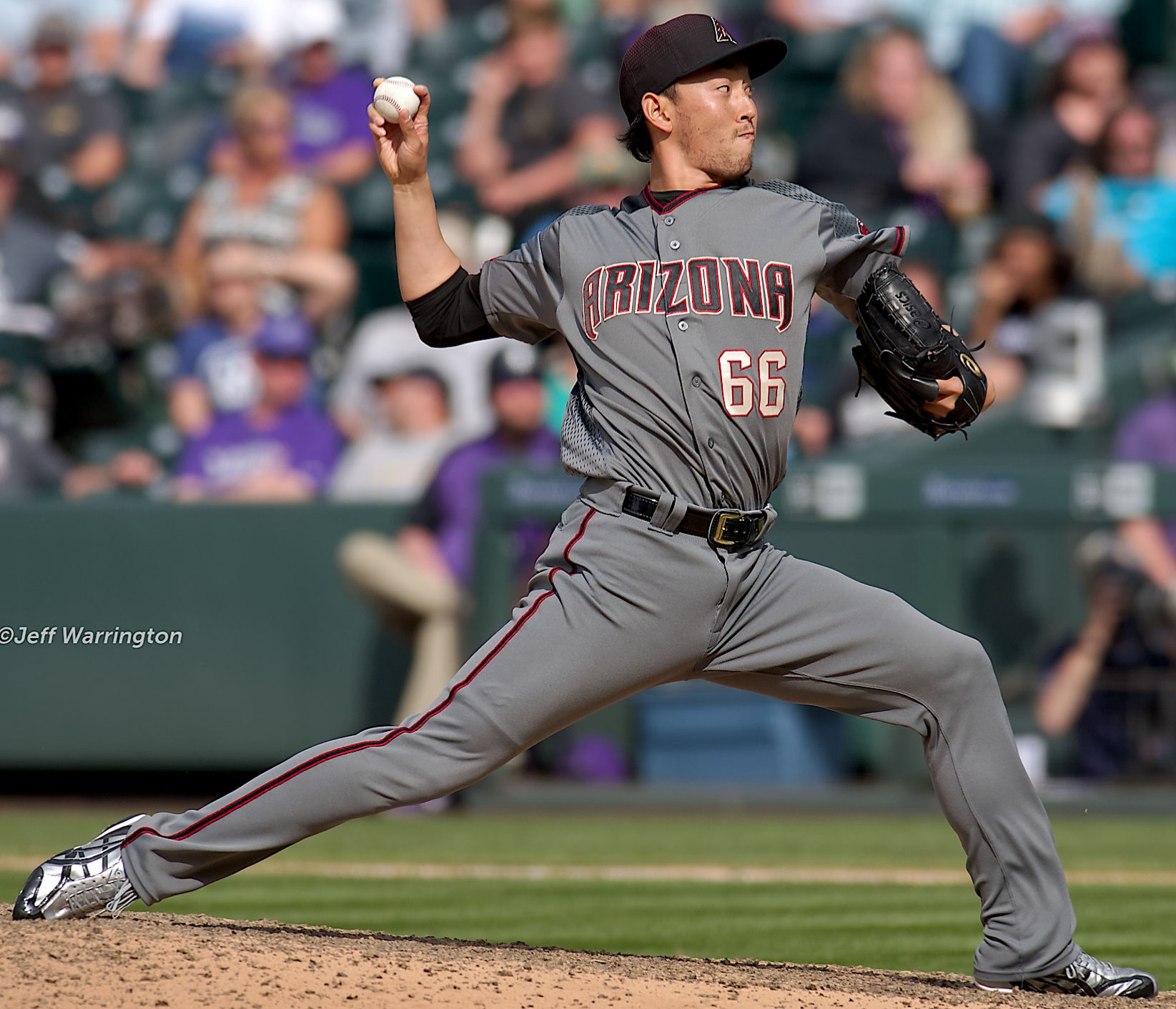
Hirano with the Arizona Diamondbacks in 2019

On December 22, 2017, Hirano agreed to a two-year, $6 million contract with the Arizona Diamondbacks. In his first season with Arizona, Hirano finished with a record of 4–3 with a 2.44 ERA in 75 appearances. He collected 3 saves in 66 1/3 innings. In 2019, Hirano could not replicate his success, posting a less appealing 5-5 record and 4.75 ERA across 62 contests.

=== Seattle Mariners ===
Hirano agreed to a one-year, $1.6M contract with the Seattle Mariners on January 30, 2020. On July 14, Hirano mentioned that he had tested positive for COVID-19. On August 22, he made his Mariners debut. In 13 appearances for the Mariners, Hirano pitched to a 5.84 ERA with 11 strikeouts in 12 1/3 innings pitched. On October 28, Hirano became a free agent.

=== Orix Buffaloes (second stint) ===
On February 6, 2021, Hirano signed a one-year, $1.4MM contract to return to the Orix Buffaloes of Nippon Professional Baseball, the team with which he had begun his career and pitched for from 2005 to 2017.

On October 2, 2023, he recorded his 250th save combined between his time in Japan and the USA. He became the 4th pitcher to reach over 250 saves, after Hitoki Iwase, Shingo Takatsu and Kazuhiro Sasaki.

== International career ==
Hirano played for the Japanese National Team at the 2017 World Baseball Classic. After advancing to the championship round, Japan lost to the United States 2–1 in the semifinal, finishing the tournament in third place. Hirano earned a bronze medal for his performance in the games.
