= Kenya Suzuki =

Japanese baseball player (born 1997)

Kenya Suzuki 鈴木 健矢
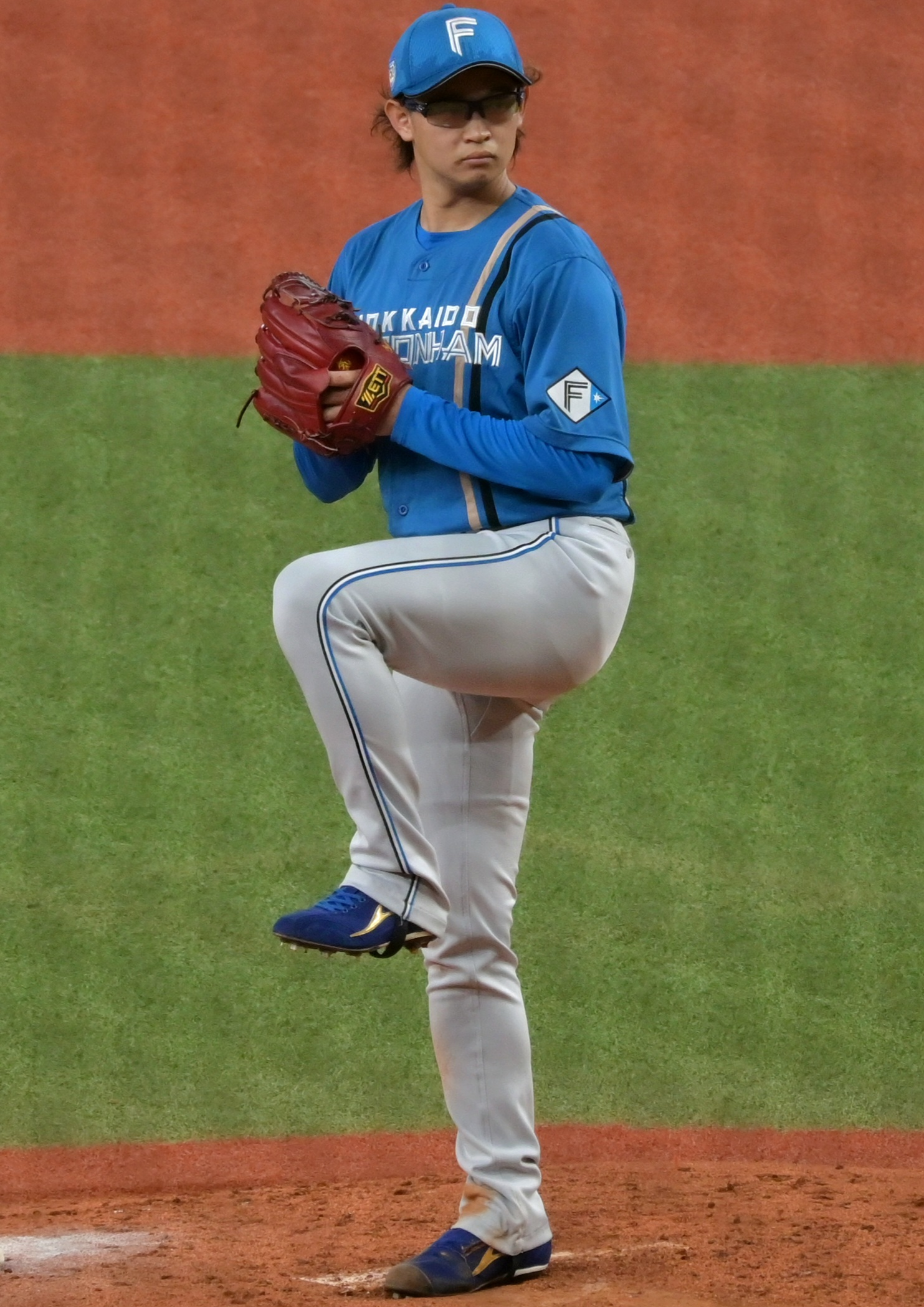

Hiroshima Toyo Carp – No. 41
- Pitcher
- Born: December 11, 1997 (age 28); Sodegaura, Chiba, Japan
- Bats: Right Throws: Right

NPB debut
- June 23, 2020, for the Hokkaido Nippon-Ham Fighters

Career statistics (through 2024 season)
- Win–loss record: 9-8
- Earned Run Average: 3.27
- Strikeouts: 76
- Saves: 0
- Holds: 5
- Stats at Baseball Reference

Teams
- Hokkaido Nippon-Ham Fighters (2020–2024); Hiroshima Toyo Carp (2025–present)

Kenya Suzuki (鈴木 健矢, Suzuki Kenya; born December 11, 1997 in Sodegaura, Chiba, Japan) is a Japanese professional baseball pitcher for the Hiroshima Toyo Carp of Nippon Professional Baseball (NPB).
