= Koki Kitayama =

Japanese baseball player (born 1999)

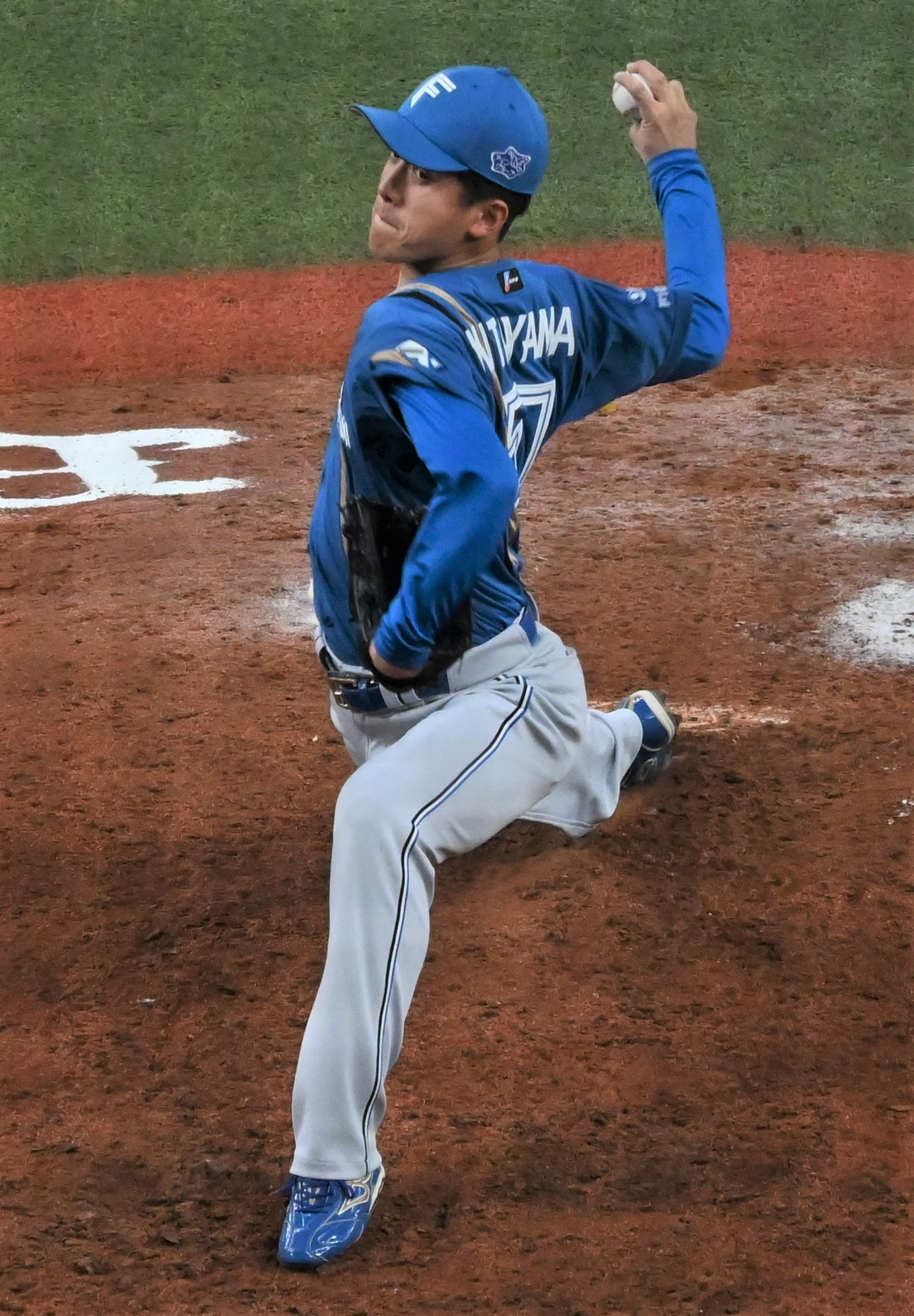
- Kitayama with the Hokkaido Nippon-Ham Fighters

Hokkaido Nippon-Ham Fighters – No. 15
- Pitcher
- Born: April 10, 1999 (age 26); Keihoku, Kyoto, Japan
- Bats: Right Throws: Right

NPB debut
- March 25, 2022, for the Hokkaido Nippon-Ham Fighters

NPB statistics (through 2025 season)
- Win–loss record: 23–16
- Earned run average: 2.41
- Strikeouts: 346
- Stats at Baseball Reference

Teams
- Hokkaido Nippon-Ham Fighters (2022–present)

Career highlights and awards
- NPB All-Star (2025)
Medals
Men's baseball
Representing Japan
WBSC Premier12
Silver medal – second place	2024	Team

Koki Kitayama (北山 亘基, Kitayama Kōki; born April 10, 1999) is a Japanese professional baseball pitcher for the Hokkaido Nippon-Ham Fighters of Nippon Professional Baseball (NPB).

== Career ==
On June 19, 2025, Kitayama pitched a no-hitter until the bottom of the 9th inning, when he allowed a solo home run to Yomiuri Giants catcher Takumi Ohshiro. He was named an NPB All-Star for the first time in 2025.
