= Ryōsuke Tatsumi =

Japanese baseball player (born 1996)

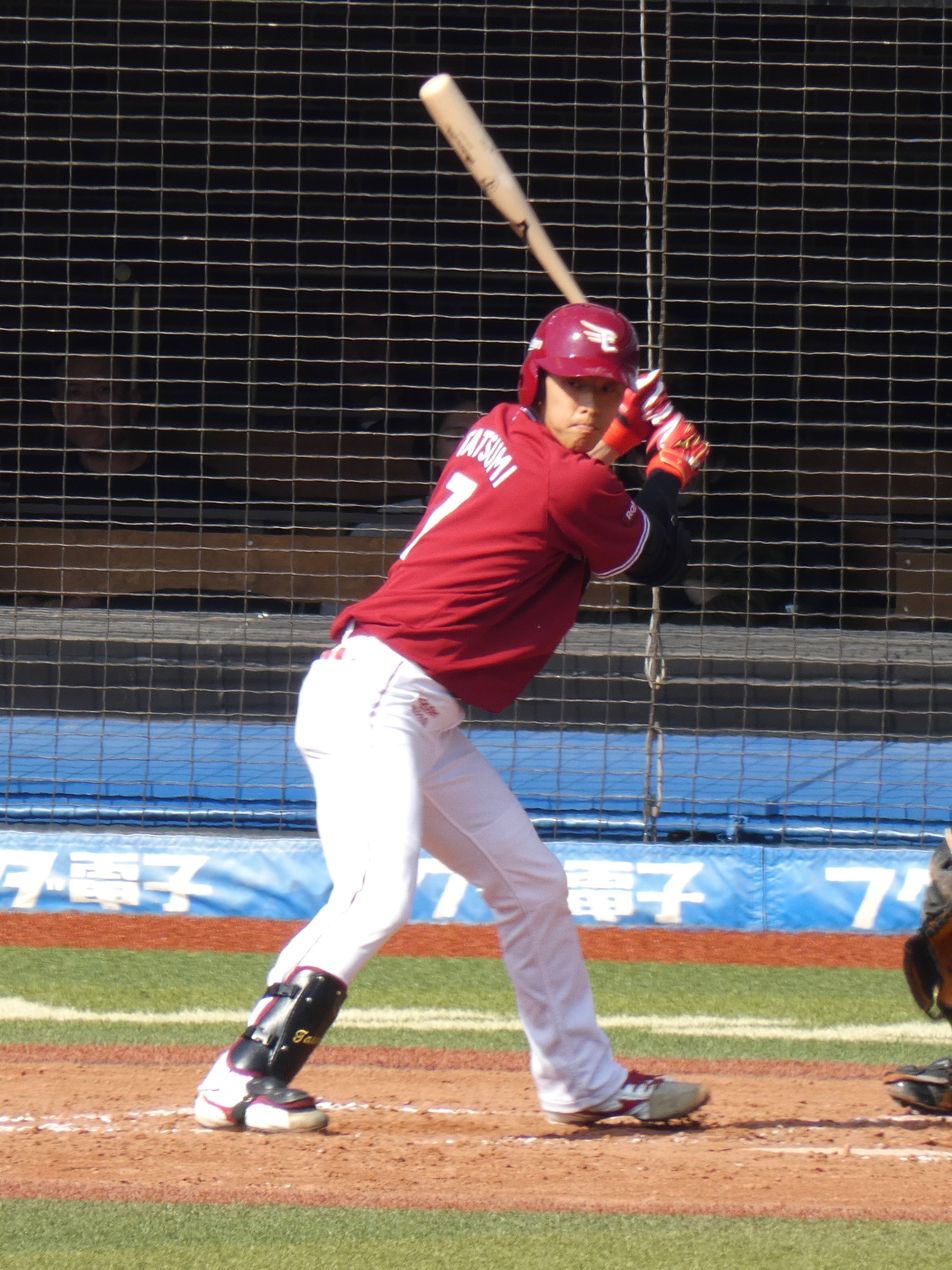
- Tatsumi with the Tohoku Rakuten Golden Eagles

Tohoku Rakuten Golden Eagles – No. 8
- Outfielder
- Born: December 27, 1996 (age 29); Kobe, Hyōgo, Japan
- Bats: Left Throws: Right

NPB debut
- March 30, 2019, for the Tohoku Rakuten Golden Eagles

NPB statistics (through August 21, 2026)
- Batting average: .257
- Hits: 793
- Home runs: 66
- Runs batted in: 289
- Stolen base: 101
- Stats at Baseball Reference

Teams
- Tohoku Rakuten Golden Eagles (2019–present)

Career highlights and awards
- 5× Pacific League Golden Glove Award (2021–2025); NPB All-Star (2024)
Medals
Men's baseball
Representing Japan
WBSC Premier12
Silver medal – second place	2024	Team

Ryōsuke Tatsumi (辰己 涼介, Tatsumi Ryōsuke; born December 27, 1996 in Kobe, Hyōgo, Japan) is a Japanese professional baseball outfielder for the Tohoku Rakuten Golden Eagles of Nippon Professional Baseball (NPB).
