= Yuki Udagawa =

Japanese baseball player (born 1998)

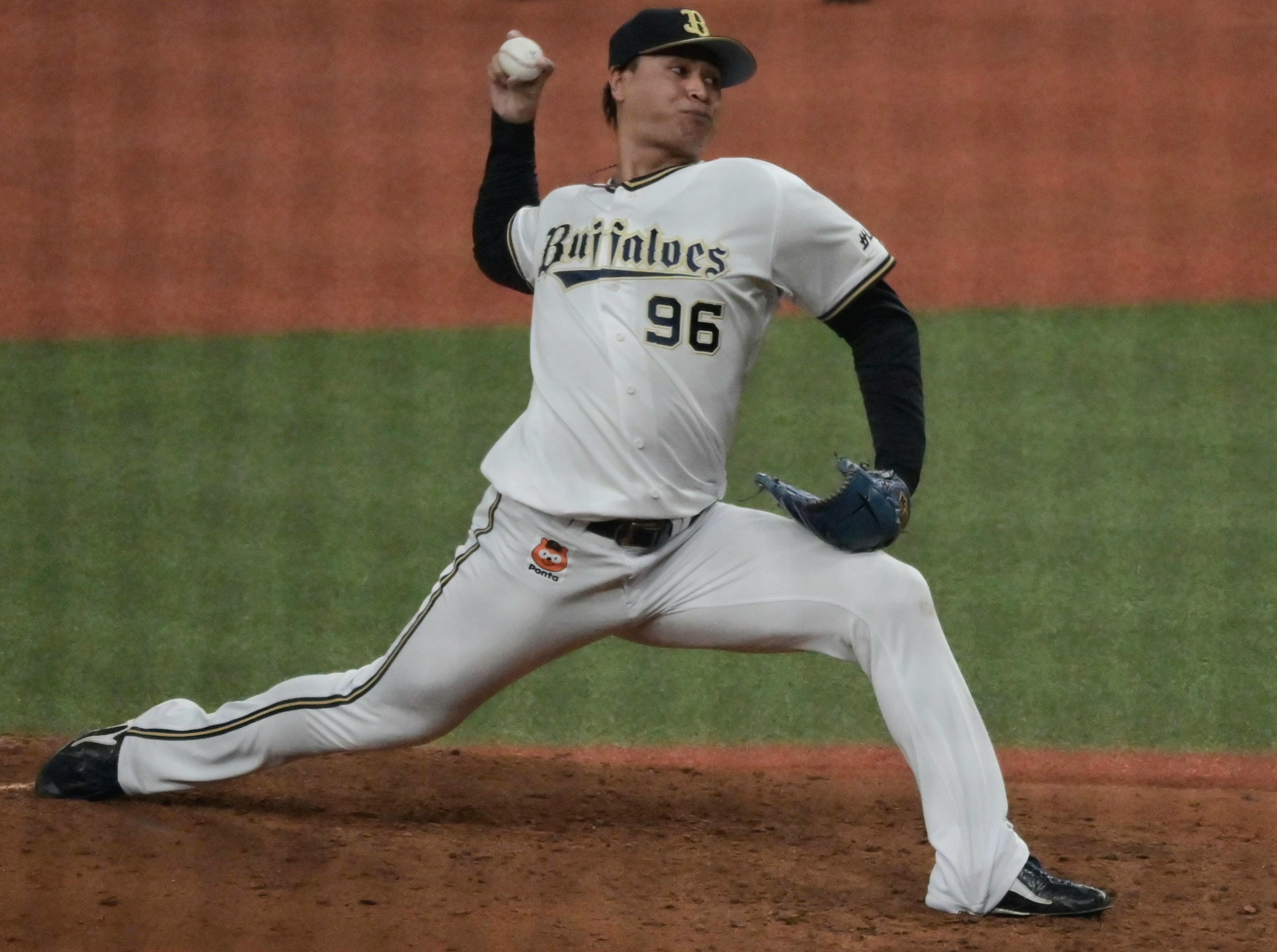

Orix Buffaloes – No. 14
- Pitcher
- Born: November 10, 1998 (age 27); Koshigaya, Saitama, Japan
- Bats: Right Throws: Right

NPB debut
- August 3, 2022, for the Orix Buffaloes

Career statistics (through 2023 season)
- Win–loss record: 6–1
- Earned run average: 1.46
- Strikeouts: 84
- Saves: 2
- Holds: 23
- Stats at Baseball Reference

Teams
- Orix Buffaloes (2021–present)

Career highlights and awards
- Japan Series champion (2022)
Medals
Men's baseball
Representing Japan
World Baseball Classic
Gold medal – first place	2023 Miami	Team

Yuki Udagawa (宇田川 優希, Udagawa Yuki; born November 10, 1998 in Koshigaya, Saitama, Japan) is a professional Japanese baseball player. He plays pitcher for the Orix Buffaloes.
