= Yuji Nishino =

Japanese baseball player (born 1991)

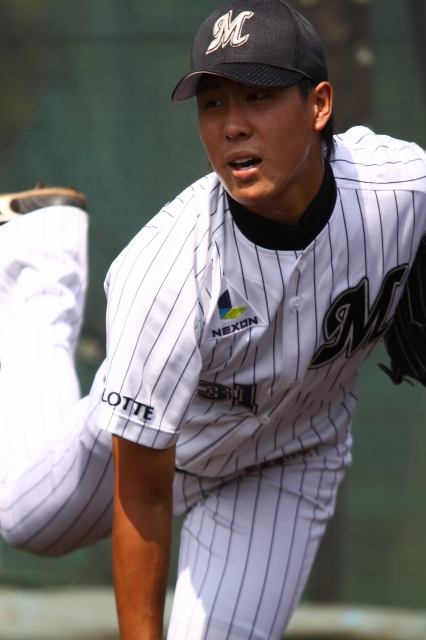
- Nishino with the Chiba Lotte Marines

Chiba Lotte Marines – No. 29
- Pitcher
- Born: March 6, 1991 (age 35)
- Bats: Right Throws: Right

NPB debut
- March 30, 2013, for the Chiba Lotte Marines

NPB statistics (through 2024 season)
- Win–loss record: 38–37
- ERA: 3.06
- Strikeouts: 580
- Saves: 88
- Holds: 38
- Stats at Baseball Reference

Teams
- Chiba Lotte Marines (2013–present)

Career highlights and awards
- 2× NPB All-Star (2013, 2016)

Yuji Nishino (西野 勇士, born March 6, 1991) is a Japanese professional baseball pitcher for the Chiba Lotte Marines of Nippon Professional Baseball (NPB).

Nishino was added to the Japanese baseball team's roster for the 2014 Major League Baseball Japan All-Star Series.
