= 2023 Nippon Professional Baseball season =

74th annual season of Nippon Professional Baseball

2023 NPB season
- League: Nippon Professional Baseball
- Sport: Baseball
- Duration: March 30 – October 9
- Games: 143
- Teams: 12

Central League pennant
- League champions: Hanshin Tigers
- Runners-up: Hiroshima Toyo Carp
- Season MVP: Shoki Murakami

Pacific League pennant
- League champions: Orix Buffaloes
- Runners-up: Chiba Lotte Marines
- Season MVP: Yoshinobu Yamamoto

Climax Series
- CL champions: Hanshin Tigers
- CL runners-up: Hiroshima Toyo Carp
- PL champions: Orix Buffaloes
- PL runners-up: Chiba Lotte Marines

Japan Series
- Venue: Hanshin Koshien Stadium, Nishinomiya, Hyōgo; Kyocera Dome Osaka, Nishi-ku, Osaka
- Champions: Hanshin Tigers
- Runners-up: Orix Buffaloes
- Finals MVP: Koji Chikamoto (Hanshin)

NPB seasons
- ← 2022 2024 →

The 2023 Nippon Professional Baseball season was the 74th season of professional baseball in Japan since Nippon Professional Baseball (NPB) was reorganized in 1950. There are 12 NPB teams, split evenly between the Central League and Pacific League.

== Regular season standings ==
Central League regular season standings
Rank	Team	G	W	L	T	Pct.	GB	Home	Road
1	Hanshin Tigers	143	85	53	5	.616	—	45–23–3	40–30–2
2	Hiroshima Toyo Carp	143	74	65	4	.532	11½	44–26–2	30–39–2
3	Yokohama DeNA BayStars	143	74	66	3	.529	12	39–30–2	35–36–1
4	Yomiuri Giants	143	71	70	2	.504	15½	39–30–2	32–40–0
5	Tokyo Yakult Swallows	143	57	83	3	.407	29	36–36–0	21–47–3
6	Chunichi Dragons	143	56	82	5	.406	29	30–39–3	26–43–2

Pacific League regular season standings
Rank	Team	G	W	L	T	Pct.	GB	Home	Road
1	Orix Buffaloes	143	86	53	4	.619	—	41–28–3	45–25–1
2	Chiba Lotte Marines	143	70	68	5	.507	15½	42–27–2	28–40–3
3	Fukuoka SoftBank Hawks	143	71	69	3	.507	15½	39–32–0	32–37–3
4	Tohoku Rakuten Golden Eagles	143	70	71	2	.496	17	38–33–1	32–38–1
5	Saitama Seibu Lions	143	65	77	1	.458	22½	33–37–1	32–40–0
6	Hokkaido Nippon-Ham Fighters	143	60	82	1	.423	27½	31–40–0	29–42–1

=== Interleague ===
Regular season interleague standings
Team	G	W	L	T	Win%	GB	Home	Away
Yokohama DeNA BayStars	18	11	7	0	.611	—	6–3	5–4
Fukuoka SoftBank Hawks	18	11	7	0	.611	—	4–5	7–2
Yomiuri Giants	18	11	7	0	.611	—	5–4	6–3
Orix Buffaloes	18	11	7	0	.611	—	4–5	7–2
Hokkaido Nippon-Ham Fighters	18	10	8	0	.556	1	4–5	6–3
Tohoku Rakuten Golden Eagles	18	9	9	0	.500	2	5–4	4–5
Hiroshima Toyo Carp	18	9	9	0	.500	2	4–5	5–4
Chiba Lotte Marines	18	7	9	2	.438	3	5–4	2–5−2
Chunichi Dragons	18	7	10	1	.412	3½	2–6−1	5–4
Hanshin Tigers	18	7	10	1	.412	3½	4–4−1	3–6
Tokyo Yakult Swallows	18	7	11	0	.389	4	3–6	4–5
Saitama Seibu Lions	18	6	12	0	.333	5	4–5	2–7

Overall, the Pacific League won 54 games and lost 52 against the Central League, with 2 ties.

== Climax Series ==
First stage
Central League
2	Hiroshima Toyo Carp	2
3	Yokohama DeNA BayStars	0
Pacific League
2	Chiba Lotte Marines	2
3	Fukuoka SoftBank Hawks	1

Final stage
1	Hanshin Tigers	4
2	Hiroshima Toyo Carp	0
1	Orix Buffaloes	4
2	Chiba Lotte Marines	1

Japan Series
CL	Hanshin Tigers	4
PL	Orix Buffaloes	3

=== First stage ===
==== Central League ====
Hiroshima Toyo Carp won the series, 2−0.

Game	Date	Score	Location	Time	Attendance
1	October 14	Hiroshima Toyo Carp − 3, Yokohama DeNA BayStars − 2 (11)	Mazda Stadium	3:52	31,041
2	October 15	Hiroshima Toyo Carp − 4, Yokohama DeNA BayStars − 2	Mazda Stadium	3:32	31,059

==== Pacific League ====
Chiba Lotte Marines won the series, 2−1.

Game	Date	Score	Location	Time	Attendance
1	October 14	Chiba Lotte Marines − 8, Fukuoka SoftBank Hawks − 2	ZOZO Marine Stadium	3:02	29,126
2	October 15	Chiba Lotte Marines − 1, Fukuoka SoftBank Hawks − 3	ZOZO Marine Stadium	3:23	29,147
3	October 16	Chiba Lotte Marines − 4, Fukuoka SoftBank Hawks − 3 (10)	ZOZO Marine Stadium	4:18	29,050

=== Final stage ===
The series started with a 1–0 advantage for the first-placed team.

==== Central League ====
Hanshin Tigers won the series, 4−0.

Game	Date	Score	Location	Time	Attendance
1	October 18	Hanshin Tigers − 4, Hiroshima Toyo Carp − 1	Koshien Stadium	2:52	42,641
2	October 19	Hanshin Tigers − 2, Hiroshima Toyo Carp − 1	Koshien Stadium	3:13	42,630
3	October 20	Hanshin Tigers − 4, Hiroshima Toyo Carp − 2	Koshien Stadium	3:41	42,642

==== Pacific League ====
Orix Buffaloes won the series, 4−1.

Game	Date	Score	Location	Time	Attendance
1	October 18	Orix Buffaloes − 8, Chiba Lotte Marines − 5	Kyocera Dome Osaka	3:09	35,930
2	October 19	Orix Buffaloes − 5, Chiba Lotte Marines − 6	Kyocera Dome Osaka	3:22	33,634
3	October 20	Orix Buffaloes − 2, Chiba Lotte Marines − 0	Kyocera Dome Osaka	3:09	35,943
4	October 21	Orix Buffaloes − 3, Chiba Lotte Marines − 2	Kyocera Dome Osaka	2:32	35,804

=== 2023 Japan Series ===
Hanshin Tigers (4) vs. Orix Buffaloes (3)

Game	Date	Score	Location	Time	Attendance
1	October 28	Hanshin Tigers − 8, Orix Buffaloes − 0	Kyocera Dome Osaka	3:20	33,701
2	October 29	Hanshin Tigers − 0, Orix Buffaloes − 8	Kyocera Dome Osaka	3:09	33,584
3	October 31	Orix Buffaloes − 5, Hanshin Tigers− 4	Koshien Stadium	3:51	40,994
4	November 1	Orix Buffaloes − 3, Hanshin Tigers − 4	Koshien Stadium	4:06	41,050
5	November 2	Orix Buffaloes − 2, Hanshin Tigers− 6	Koshien Stadium	3:28	41,031
6	November 4	Hanshin Tigers − 1, Orix Buffaloes − 5	Kyocera Dome Osaka	3:01	33,633
7	November 5	Hanshin Tigers − 7, Orix Buffaloes − 1	Kyocera Dome Osaka	3:10	33,405

== Attendances ==
#	Team	Average
1	Hanshin Tigers	41,064
2	Yomiuri Giants	38,145
3	Fukuoka SoftBank Hawks	35,705
4	Yokohama DeNA BayStars	32,126
5	Chunichi Dragons	30,333
6	Hokkaido Nippon-Ham Fighters	26,515
7	Chiba Lotte Marines	25,055
8	Hiroshima Toyo Carp	28,540
9	Tokyo Yakult Swallows	27,447
10	ORIX Buffaloes	27,048
11	Saitama Seibu Lions	20,040
12	Tohoku Rakuten Golden Eagles	18,868

== See also ==
- 2023 Major League Baseball season
- 2023 KBO League season
- 2023 Mexican League season
- 2023 Chinese Professional Baseball League season
- 2023 Frontier League season
- 2023 Pioneer League season
