= 2021 Tohoku Rakuten Golden Eagles season =

Professional sports season in Nippon Professional Baseball

2021 Tohoku Rakuten Golden Eagles
- Climax Series berth
- League: Pacific League
- Ballpark: Rakuten Seimei Park Miyagi
- Record: 66–62–15 (.516)
- League place: 3rd
- Parent company: Rakuten
- President: Yozo Tachibana
- General manager: Kazuhisa Ishii
- Manager: Kazuhisa Ishii
- Captain: Eigoro Mogi
- Average attendance: 8,545

The 2021 Tohoku Rakuten Golden Eagles season was the 17th season of the Tohoku Rakuten Golden Eagles franchise. The Eagles played their home games at Rakuten Seimei Park Miyagi in the city of Sendai as members of Nippon Professional Baseball's Pacific League. The team was led by Kazuhisa Ishii in his first season as team manager.

Rakuten finished the season with a record of 66–62–15, securing third place in the PL and qualifying for the Climax Series. They were eliminated by the Chiba Lotte Marines in the First Stage in two games.

== Regular season ==
=== Standings ===
2021 Pacific League regular season standings
Pos	Team	G	W	L	T	Pct.	GB	Home	Road
1	Orix Buffaloes^{†}	143	70	55	18	.560	—	38–22–12	32–33–6
2	Chiba Lotte Marines*	143	67	57	19	.540	2½	33–32–7	34–25–12
**3**	**Tohoku Rakuten Golden Eagles***	**143**	**66**	**62**	**15**	**.514**	**5½**	**31–33–8**	**35–29–7**
4	Fukuoka SoftBank Hawks	143	60	62	21	.492	8½	31–29–11	29–33–10
5	Hokkaido Nippon-Ham Fighters	143	55	68	20	.447	14	25–36–10	30–32–10
6	Saitama Seibu Lions	143	55	70	18	.440	15	30–34–7	25–36–11

^{†} League champion and advanced directly to the final stage of the Climax Series
* Advanced to the first stage of the Climax Series

=== Record vs. opponents ===
2021 record vs. opponents
Team	Buffaloes	Eagles	Fighters	Hawks	Lions	Marines	CL
Buffaloes	—	10–10–5	10–11–4	13–11–1	15–8–2	10–10–5	12–5–1
**Eagles**	**10–10–5**	—	**12–11–2**	**11–10–4**	**15–8–2**	**9–15–1**	**9–8–1**
Fighters	11–10–4	11–12–2	—	6–13–6	13–9–3	7–13–5	7–11
Hawks	11–13–1	10–11–4	13–6–6	—	9–13–3	12–10–3	5–9–4
Lions	8–15–2	8–15–2	9–13–3	13–9–3	—	10–11–4	7–7–4
Marines	10–10–5	15–9–1	13–7–5	10–12–3	11–10–4	—	8–9–1

=== Interleague ===
2021 regular season interleague standings
Pos	Team	G	W	L	T	Pct.	GB	Home	Road
1	Orix Buffaloes^{†}	18	12	5	1	.706	—	7–1–1	5–4
2	Hanshin Tigers	18	11	7	0	.611	1.5	3–6	8–1
3	Yokohama DeNA BayStars	18	9	6	3	.600	2	6–2–1	3–4–2
4	Chunichi Dragons	18	9	7	2	.563	2.5	5–2–2	4–5
5	Tokyo Yakult Swallows	18	10	8	0	.556	2.5	5–4	5–4
**6**	**Tohoku Rakuten Golden Eagles**	**18**	**9**	**8**	**1**	**.529**	**3**	**3–5–1**	**6–3**
7	Saitama Seibu Lions	18	7	7	4	.500	3.5	5–3–1	2–4–3
8	Chiba Lotte Marines	18	8	9	1	.471	4	5–4	3–5–1
9	Yomiuri Giants	18	7	8	3	.467	4	4–3–2	3–5–1
10	Hokkaido Nippon-Ham Fighters	18	7	11	0	.389	5.5	2–7	5–4
11	Fukuoka SoftBank Hawks	18	5	9	4	.357	5.5	3–4–2	2–5–2
12	Hiroshima Toyo Carp	18	3	12	3	.200	8	2–6–1	1–6–2

^{†} Interleague champion

=== Opening Day starting roster ===
Friday, March 26, 2021, vs. Hokkaido Nippon-Ham Fighters

2021 Rakuten Eagles Opening Day starting roster
Order	Player	Position
1	Ryosuke Tatsumi	Center fielder
2	Hiroto Kobukata	Shortstop
3	Hiroaki Shimauchi	Left fielder
4	Hideto Asamura	Second baseman
5	Eigoro Mogi	Third baseman
6	Daichi Suzuki	First baseman
7	Kazuki Tanaka	Right fielder
8	Yuya Ogo	Designated hitter
9	Hikaru Ohta	Catcher
—	Hideaki Wakui	Starting pitcher

=== Game log ===
2021 game log: 66–62–15 (Home: 31–33–8; Away: 35–29–7)
March/April: 14–9–6 (Home: 7–5–4; Away: 7–4–2)

#	Date	Opponent	Score	Win	Loss	Save	Stadium	Attendance	Record	Streak
1	March 26	Fighters	8–2	**Wakui** (1–0)	Uwasawa (0–1)	—	Rakuten Seimei Park	14,559	1–0–0	W1
2	March 27	Fighters	4–9	Kato (1–0)	**Takata** (0–1)	—	Rakuten Seimei Park	14,681	1–1–0	L1
3	March 28	Fighters	5–0	**Hayakawa** (1–0)	Ikeda (0–1)	—	Rakuten Seimei Park	14,425	2–1–0	W1
4	March 30	@ Marines	5–0	**Kishi** (1–0)	Ojima (0–1)	—	Zozo Marine Stadium	9,931	3–1–0	W2
5	March 31	@ Marines	2–1	**T. Norimoto** (1–0)	Iwashita (0–1)	**Matsui** (1)	Zozo Marine Stadium	9,594	4–1–0	W3
6	April 1	@ Marines	5–16	Motomae (1–0)	**Takinaka** (0–1)	—	Zozo Marine Stadium	7,447	4–2–0	L1
7	April 2	Buffaloes	4–2	**Wakui** (2–0)	Yamasaki (0–1)	**Matsui** (2)	Rakuten Seimei Park	7,247	5–2–0	W1
8	April 3	Buffaloes	3–2	**Anraku** (1–0)	Yamaoka (0–2)	**Matsui** (3)	Rakuten Seimei Park	9,856	6–2–0	W2
9	April 4	Buffaloes	0–4	Miyagi (2–0)	**Hayakawa** (1–1)	—	Rakuten Seimei Park	7,376	6–3–0	L1
10	April 6	@ Lions	13–2	**Kishi** (2–0)	Matsumoto (1–1)	—	MetLife Dome	8,608	7–3–0	W1
11	April 7	@ Lions	6–3	**T. Norimoto** (2–0)	Imai (0–1)	—	MetLife Dome	7,390	8–3–0	W2
12	April 8	@ Lions	4–0	**Takinaka** (1–1)	Uema (0–1)	—	MetLife Dome	6,653	9–3–0	W3
13	April 9	Hawks	1–1	Game tied after 9 innings			Rakuten Seimei Park	5,049	9–3–1	T1
14	April 10	Hawks	8–8	Game tied after 9 innings			Rakuten Seimei Park	8,122	9–3–2	T2
15	April 11	Hawks	0–2	Taura (1–0)	**Hayakawa** (1–2)	Mori (3)	Rakuten Seimei Park	8,515	9–4–2	L1
16	April 13	Marines	2–6	Ishikawa (1–0)	**Kishi** (2–1)	Masuda (2)	Rakuten Seimei Park	6,188	9–5–2	L2
17	April 14	Marines	2–2	Game tied after 9 innings			Rakuten Seimei Park	6,303	9–5–3	T1
18	April 15	Marines	3–7	Iwashita (2–1)	**Takinaka** (1–2)	—	Rakuten Seimei Park	5,874	9–6–3	L1
19	April 16	@ Fighters	4–1	**Wakui** (3–0)	Hori (1–1)	**Matsui** (4)	Tokyo Dome	9,559	10–6–3	W1
20	April 17	@ Fighters	1–4	Uwasawa (1–2)	**M. Tanaka** (0–1)	Sugiura (4)	Tokyo Dome	9,985	10–7–3	L1
21	April 18	@ Fighters	4–1	**Hayakawa** (2–2)	Kaneko (0–1)	**Matsui** (5)	Tokyo Dome	9,981	11–7–3	W1
22	April 20	@ Hawks	4–6	Kayama (1–0)	**Kishi** (2–2)	Mori (5)	Kitakyushu Stadium	9,801	11–8–3	L1
23	April 21	@ Hawks	1–4	Wada (2–1)	**T. Norimoto** (2–1)	Mori (6)	PayPay Dome	12,049	11–9–3	L2
24	April 23	Lions	2–2	Game tied after 9 innings			Rakuten Seimei Park	6,205	11–9–4	T1
25	April 24	Lions	2–1	**M. Tanaka** (1–1)	Honda (0–1)	**Matsui** (6)	Rakuten Seimei Park	6,619	12–9–4	W1
26	April 25	Lions	8–4	**Hayakawa** (3–2)	Hirai (3–1)	—	Rakuten Seimei Park	7,037	13–9–4	W2
27	April 27	@ Buffaloes	5–5	Game tied after 9 innings			Kyocera Dome	—	13–9–5	T1
28	April 28	@ Buffaloes	0–0	Game tied after 9 innings			Kyocera Dome	—	13–9–6	T2
—	April 29	@ Buffaloes	Postponed (COVID-19) – Makeup date: October 20				Kyocera Dome	—	—	—
29	April 30	Marines	8–1	**Wakui** (4–0)	T. Nakamura (0–1)	—	Rakuten Seimei Park	4,734	14–9–6	W1

May: 11–11–3 (Home: 5–3–2; Away: 6–8–1)

#	Date	Opponent	Score	Win	Loss	Save	Stadium	Attendance	Record	Streak
30	May 1	Marines	3–0	**M. Tanaka** (2–1)	Futaki (1–2)	**Matsui** (7)	Rakuten Seimei Park	7,914	15–9–6	W2
31	May 2	Marines	5–6	Karakawa (2–1)	**Matsui** (0–1)	Masuda (6)	Rakuten Seimei Park	7,622	15–10–6	L1
32	May 3	@ Hawks	7–4	**Takinaka** (2–2)	Niho (0–1)	**Matsui** (8)	PayPay Dome	18,382	16–10–6	W1
33	May 4	@ Hawks	4–6	Tsumori (1–0)	**Kishi** (2–3)	Moinelo (2)	PayPay Dome	18,584	16–11–6	L1
34	May 5	@ Hawks	5–5	Game tied after 9 innings			PayPay Dome	17,902	16–11–7	T1
35	May 7	@ Fighters	1–6	VerHagen (1–2)	**Wakui** (4–1)	—	Sapporo Dome	5,674	16–12–7	L1
36	May 8	@ Fighters	1–4	Uwasawa (3–2)	**M. Tanaka** (2–2)	B. Rodriguez (1)	Sapporo Dome	13,022	16–13–7	L2
37	May 9	@ Fighters	6–3	**Hayakawa** (4–2)	Ikeda (2–4)	**Matsui** (9)	Sapporo Dome	9,698	17–13–7	W1
38	May 11	Lions	3–3	Game tied after 9 innings			Rakuten Seimei Park	5,128	17–13–8	T1
39	May 12	Lions	4–3	**T. Norimoto** (3–1)	Neal (0–1)	**Matsui** (10)	Rakuten Seimei Park	5,128	18–13–8	W1
40	May 14	@ Buffaloes	4–9	Yamaoka (2–3)	**Wakui** (4–2)	—	Hotto Motto Field	4,888	18–14–8	L1
41	May 15	@ Buffaloes	3–4	Takeyasu (2–0)	**M. Tanaka** (2–3)	K. Suzuki (1)	Hotto Motto Field	7,795	18–15–8	L2
42	May 16	@ Buffaloes	1–0	**Hayakawa** (5–2)	Yamasaki (1–4)	—	Kyocera Dome	—	19–15–8	W1
43	May 18	Fighters	3–2	**Sung** (1–0)	B. Rodriguez (0–1)	**Matsui** (11)	Rakuten Seimei Park	6,016	20–15–8	W2
44	May 19	Fighters	3–2	**T. Norimoto** (4–1)	Kato (3–1)	**Matsui** (12)	Rakuten Seimei Park	7,035	21–15–8	W3
45	May 20	Fighters	1–4	Hori (2–1)	**Fukuyama** (0–1)	Sugiura (9)	Rakuten Seimei Park	8,448	21–16–8	L1
46	May 21	@ Marines	13–6	**Wakui** (5–2)	Ishikawa (2–2)	—	Zozo Marine Stadium	7,742	22–16–8	W1
47	May 22	@ Marines	1–3	Karakawa (3–1)	**Fukuyama** (0–2)	Masuda (11)	Zozo Marine Stadium	11,788	22–17–8	L1
48	May 23	@ Marines	6–5	**Hayakawa** (6–2)	Ojima (1–2)	**Matsui** (13)	Zozo Marine Stadium	10,605	23–17–8	W1
49	May 25	@ Giants	4–9	Togo (4–2)	**Kishi** (2–4)	—	Tokyo Dome	10,329	23–18–8	L1
50	May 26	@ Giants	2–5	Takahashi (6–1)	**T. Norimoto** (4–2)	De La Rosa (6)	Tokyo Dome	9,778	23–19–8	L2
51	May 27	@ Giants	2–0	**Takinaka** (3–2)	Yokogawa (0–1)	**Matsui** (14)	Tokyo Dome	8,953	24–19–8	W1
52	May 28	BayStars	6–7	Kuniyoshi (1–0)	**Wakui** (5–3)	Mishima (7)	Rakuten Seimei Park	10,822	24–20–8	L1
53	May 29	BayStars	1–1	Game tied after 9 innings			Rakuten Seimei Park	13,057	24–20–9	T1
54	May 30	BayStars	5–1	**Sakai** (1–0)	Ishida (1–1)	—	Rakuten Seimei Park	12,426	25–20–9	W1

June: 11–10–1 (Home: 5–8–1; Away: 6–2–0)

#	Date	Opponent	Score	Win	Loss	Save	Stadium	Attendance	Record	Streak
55	June 1	@ Swallows	4–7	Onishi (1–0)	**Sakai** (1–1)	McGough (6)	Meiji Jingu Stadium	7,809	25–21–9	L1
56	June 2	@ Swallows	3–1	**T. Norimoto** (5–2)	Taguchi (2–4)	**Matsui** (15)	Meiji Jingu Stadium	7,543	26–21–9	W1
57	June 3	@ Swallows	4–2	**Takinaka** (4–2)	Sneed (1–1)	**Matsui** (16)	Meiji Jingu Stadium	7,105	27–21–9	W2
58	June 4	@ Carp	12–5	**Wakui** (6–3)	Y. Nakamura (0–3)	—	Mazda Stadium	14,274	28–21–9	W3
59	June 5	@ Carp	7–3	**Anraku** (2–0)	Horie (1–2)	—	Mazda Stadium	16,231	29–21–9	W4
60	June 6	@ Carp	6–4	**Hayakawa** (7–2)	K. Takahashi (2–2)	**Matsui** (17)	Mazda Stadium	16,246	30–21–9	W5
61	June 8	Dragons	5–2	**Kishi** (3–4)	Yanagi (5–2)	**Matsui** (18)	Rakuten Seimei Park	10,850	31–21–9	W6
62	June 9	Dragons	3–7	Ogasawara (4–2)	**T. Norimoto** (5–3)	—	Rakuten Seimei Park	8,854	31–22–9	L1
63	June 10	Dragons	6–2	**Takinaka** (5–2)	Katsuno (3–4)	—	Rakuten Seimei Park	8,782	32–22–9	W1
64	June 11	Tigers	2–3	Aoyagi (5–2)	**Wakui** (6–4)	Robert Suárez (20)	Rakuten Seimei Park	12,525	32–23–9	L1
65	June 12	Tigers	1–9	M. Ito (4–3)	**M. Tanaka** (2–4)	—	Rakuten Seimei Park	13,257	32–24–9	L2
66	June 13	Tigers	5–6	Fujinami (4–3)	**Matsui** (0–2)	Robert Suárez (21)	Rakuten Seimei Park	13,155	32–25–9	L3
67	June 18	Buffaloes	2–5	Yamamoto (7–5)	**Wakui** (6–5)	Yo. Hirano (6)	Rakuten Seimei Park	10,976	32–26–9	L4
—	June 19	Buffaloes	Postponed (rain) – Makeup date: June 21				Rakuten Seimei Park	—	—	—
68	June 20	Buffaloes	0–3	Miyagi (7–1)	**Hayakawa** (7–3)	Yo. Hirano (7)	Rakuten Seimei Park	13,091	32–27–9	L5
69	June 21	Buffaloes	3–4	Yamasaki (3–5)	**Takinaka** (5–3)	Yo. Hirano (8)	Rakuten Seimei Park	5,396	32–28–9	L6
70	June 22	@ Lions	0–2	Matsumoto (6–3)	**Kishi** (3–5)	Taira (8)	MetLife Dome	8,420	32–29–9	L7
71	June 23	@ Lions	6–4	**M. Tanaka** (3–4)	Y. Watanabe (0–1)	**Matsui** (19)	MetLife Dome	10,292	33–29–9	W1
72	June 25	Hawks	5–1	**T. Norimoto** (6–3)	Ishikawa (3–7)	—	Rakuten Seimei Park	7,917	34–29–9	W2
73	June 26	Hawks	3–2	**Nishiguchi** (1–0)	Martinez (5–2)	**Matsui** (20)	Rakuten Seimei Park	12,428	35–29–9	W3
74	June 27	Hawks	3–2	**Anraku** (3–0)	Wada (4–5)	**Matsui** (21)	Rakuten Seimei Park	9,680	36–29–9	W4
75	June 29	Fighters	5–5	Game tied after 9 innings			Rakuten Seimei Park	6,214	36–29–10	T1
76	June 30	Fighters	0–3	Tateno (1–0)	**Wakui** (6–6)	Sugiura (14)	Rakuten Seimei Park	8,358	36–30–10	L1

July: 5–6–1 (Home: 1–2–0; Away: 4–4–1)

#	Date	Opponent	Score	Win	Loss	Save	Stadium	Attendance	Record	Streak
77	July 1	Fighters	1–2	Ito (6–4)	**Kishi** (3–6)	Sugiura (15)	Rakuten Seimei Park	5,843	36–31–10	L2
—	July 2	@ Marines	Postponed (rain) – Makeup date: July 5				Zozo Marine Stadium	—	—	—
78	July 3	@ Marines	3–5	Flores (1–0)	**Sung** (1–1)	Masuda (19)	Zozo Marine Stadium	12,409	36–32–10	L3
79	July 4	@ Marines	6–8	Ojima (5–2)	**Takinaka** (5–4)	Masuda (20)	Zozo Marine Stadium	9,132	36–33–10	L4
80	July 5	@ Marines	1–8	Iwashita (7–4)	**Nishiguchi** (1–1)	—	Zozo Marine Stadium	3,802	36–34–10	L5
81	July 6	@ Buffaloes	7–2	**T. Norimoto** (7–3)	Yo. Hirano (0–3)	—	Kyocera Dome	4,942	37–34–10	W1
82	July 7	@ Buffaloes	6–5	**Busenitz** (1–0)	Urushihara (2–2)	**Matsui** (22)	Kyocera Dome	4,989	38–34–10	W2
83	July 8	@ Buffaloes	1–1	Game tied after 9 innings			Kyocera Dome	4,997	38–34–11	T1
84	July 10	Lions	2–6	Imai (6–3)	**Nishiguchi** (1–1)	—	Rakuten Seimei Park	13,049	38–35–11	L1
85	July 11	Lions	9–3	**Sakai** (2–1)	Togame (1–1)	—	Rakuten Seimei Park	11,832	39–35–11	W1
86	July 12	@ Hawks	0–8	Rea (3–1)	**T. Norimoto** (7–4)	—	PayPay Dome	9,957	39–36–11	L1
87	July 13	@ Hawks	6–2	**M. Tanaka** (4–5)	Ishikawa (3–8)	—	PayPay Dome	9,845	40–36–11	W1
88	July 14	@ Hawks	4–2	**Kishi** (4–6)	Higashihama (2–2)	**Matsui** (23)	PayPay Dome	9,930	41–36–11	W2
All-Star Break: CL and PL split series, 1–1
Olympic Break: Japan places first

August: 5–6–2 (Home: 1–4–1; Away: 4–2–1)

#	Date	Opponent	Score	Win	Loss	Save	Stadium	Attendance	Record	Streak
Olympic Break: Japan places first
89	August 13	@ Lions	5–0	**Kishi** (5–6)	Matsumoto (7–5)	—	MetLife Dome	7,477	42–36–11	W3
90	August 14	@ Lions	7–6	**Sakai** (3–1)	Masuda (0–3)	**Matsui** (24)	MetLife Dome	7,340	43–36–11	W4
91	August 15	@ Lions	2–10	Y. Watanabe (1–2)	**Wakui** (6–7)	—	MetLife Dome	7,291	43–37–11	L1
—	August 17	Hawks	Postponed (rain) – Makeup date: October 23				Rakuten Seimei Park	—	—	—
92	August 18	Hawks	0–3	Senga (2–1)	**Hayakawa** (7–4)	Iwasaki (6)	Rakuten Seimei Park	10,193	43–38–11	L2
93	August 20	@ Fighters	3–3	Game tied after 9 innings			Sapporo Dome	5,566	43–38–12	T1
94	August 21	@ Fighters	8–4	**Kishi** (6–6)	Itoh (7–5)	—	Sapporo Dome	8,413	44–38–12	W1
95	August 22	@ Fighters	1–2	Uwasawa (7–5)	**Wakui** (6–8)	Sugiura (17)	Sapporo Dome	7,699	44–39–12	L1
—	August 24	Buffaloes	Postponed (rain) – Makeup date: October 25				Rakuten Seimei Park	—	—	—
96	August 25	Buffaloes	2–2	Game tied after 9 innings			Rakuten Seimei Park	4,405	44–39–13	T1
97	August 26	Buffaloes	7–6	**T. Norimoto** (8–4)	Yamazaki (0–1)	**Sung** (1)	Rakuten Seimei Park	4,194	45–39–13	W1
98	August 27	Marines	1–3	Kuniyoshi (1–0)	**Anraku** (3–1)	Masuda (27)	Rakuten Seimei Park	6,135	45–40–13	L1
99	August 28	Marines	1–5	R. Sasaki (2–2)	**Kishi** (6–7)	—	Rakuten Seimei Park	8,111	45–41–13	L2
100	August 29	Marines	0–1	C. Sasaki (7–0)	**Sung** (1–2)	Masuda (28)	Rakuten Seimei Park	6,306	45–42–13	L3
101	August 31	@ Hawks	6–3	**Nishiguchi** (2–1)	Higashihama (3–3)	**Sung** (2)	Sun Marine Stadium	7,484	46–42–13	W1

September: 11–11–1 (Home: 7–4–0; Away: 4–7–1)

#	Date	Opponent	Score	Win	Loss	Save	Stadium	Attendance	Record	Streak
102	September 2	@ Hawks	2–5	Senga (4–1)	**T. Norimoto** (8–5)	Kaino (1)	PayPay Dome	1,630	46–43–13	L1
103	September 3	Lions	4–8	Moriwaki (2–0)	**Sung** (1–3)	—	Rakuten Seimei Park	4,742	46–44–13	L2
104	September 4	Lions	8–5	**Kishi** (7–7)	Imai (6–5)	**Sakai** (1)	Rakuten Seimei Park	5,088	47–44–13	W1
105	September 5	Lions	8–2	**Nishiguchi** (3–1)	Y. Watanabe (2–3)	—	Rakuten Seimei Park	6,531	48–44–13	W2
106	September 7	@ Fighters	2–4	Itoh (9–5)	**Hayakawa** (7–5)	B. Rodriguez (3)	Sapporo Dome	4,990	48–45–13	L1
107	September 8	@ Fighters	8–0	**Takinaka** (6–4)	Uwasawa (8–6)	—	Sapporo Dome	4,992	49–45–13	W1
108	September 9	@ Fighters	4–0	**T. Norimoto** (9–5)	VerHagen (3–7)	—	Sapporo Dome	4,989	50–45–13	W2
109	September 10	@ Marines	2–3	Masuda (1–4)	**Sakai** (3–2)	—	Zozo Marine Stadium	8,387	50–46–13	L1
110	September 11	@ Marines	1–4	Ojima (7–3)	**Kishi** (7–8)	—	Zozo Marine Stadium	9,924	50–47–13	L2
111	September 12	@ Marines	2–9	Kawamura (2–0)	**Ishibashi** (0–1)	—	Zozo Marine Stadium	7,794	50–48–13	L3
112	September 14	Buffaloes	4–1	**Hayakawa** (8–5)	Miyagi (11–2)	**Sakai** (2)	Rakuten Seimei Park	6,034	51–48–13	W1
113	September 15	Buffaloes	7–0	**Takinaka** (7–4)	Yamazaki (0–2)	—	Rakuten Seimei Park	6,739	52–48–13	W2
114	September 16	Buffaloes	1–3	Tajima (6–7)	**Anraku** (3–2)	Yo. Hirano (18)	Rakuten Seimei Park	6,003	52–49–13	L1
—	September 18	Hawks	Postponed (rain) – Makeup date: October 24				Rakuten Seimei Park	—	—	—
115	September 19	Hawks	4–2	**Nishiguchi** (4–1)	Iwasaki (2–4)	**Sakai** (3)	Rakuten Seimei Park	9,993	53–49–13	W1
116	September 20	Hawks	4–5	Matsumoto (2–3)	**M. Tanaka** (4–6)	Mori (9)	Rakuten Seimei Park	9,143	53–50–13	L1
117	September 22	@ Lions	4–2	**Hayakawa** (9–5)	Hamaya (1–4)	**Sung** (3)	MetLife Dome	8,756	54–50–13	W1
118	September 23	@ Lions	3–4	Taira (2–2)	**Sakai** (3–3)	—	MetLife Dome	9,396	54–51–13	L1
119	September 24	@ Buffaloes	4–3	**T. Norimoto** (10–5)	Miyagi (11–3)	**Sung** (4)	Kyocera Dome	5,275	55–51–13	W1
120	September 25	@ Buffaloes	2–3	Yamamoto (15–5)	**Kishi** (7–9)	Yo. Hirano (21)	Kyocera Dome	9,560	55–52–13	L1
121	September 26	@ Buffaloes	1–1	Game tied after 9 innings			Kyocera Dome	9,589	55–52–14	T1
122	September 28	Fighters	1–3	Kawano (3–4)	**Hayakawa** (9–6)	Sugiura (23)	Rakuten Seimei Park	4,986	55–53–14	L1
123	September 29	Fighters	5–0	**Takinaka** (8–4)	Itoh (9–7)	—	Rakuten Seimei Park	4,980	56–53–14	W1
124	September 30	Fighters	8–5	**Yuge** (1–0)	Kaneko (0–4)	—	Rakuten Seimei Park	4,991	57–53–14	W2

October: 9–9–1 (Home: 5–7–0; Away: 4–2–1)

#	Date	Opponent	Score	Win	Loss	Save	Stadium	Attendance	Record	Streak
—	October 1	Marines	Postponed (rain) – Makeup date: October 27				Rakuten Seimei Park	—	—	—
125	October 2	Marines	6–1	**Kishi** (8–9)	Futaki (5–6)	—	Rakuten Seimei Park	9,851	58–53–14	W3
126	October 3	Marines	0–2	Ojima (10–3)	**M. Tanaka** (4–7)	—	Rakuten Seimei Park	9,967	58–54–14	L1
127	October 5	@ Hawks	7–7	Game tied after 9 innings			PayPay Dome	8,019	58–54–15	T1
128	October 6	@ Hawks	5–0	**Takinaka** (9–4)	Martinez (9–4)	—	PayPay Dome	8,233	59–54–15	W1
129	October 7	@ Marines	3–2	**Sung** (2–3)	Masuda (1–6)	**Anraku** (1)	Zozo Marine Stadium	9,933	60–54–15	W2
130	October 9	@ Lions	2–1	**Nishiguchi** (5–1)	Taira (2–4)	**Anraku** (2)	MetLife Dome	9,301	61–54–15	W3
131	October 10	@ Lions	2–3	Taira (3–4)	**Nishiguchi** (5–2)	—	MetLife Dome	9,435	61–55–15	L1
132	October 13	Hawks	2–1	**Sung** (3–3)	Mori (1–2)	—	Rakuten Seimei Park	7,334	62–55–15	W1
133	October 14	Hawks	5–6	Furuya (1–1)	**Anraku** (3–3)	Mori (15)	Rakuten Seimei Park	8,108	62–56–15	L1
134	October 15	Lions	1–5	Imai (8–7)	**Takinaka** (9–5)	—	Rakuten Seimei Park	9,054	62–57–15	L2
135	October 16	Lions	3–0	**Kishi** (9–9)	Hamaya (1–6)	**Sung** (5)	Rakuten Seimei Park	8,127	63–57–15	W1
136	October 17	Lions	5–6	Y. Watanabe (4–4)	**M. Tanaka** (4–8)	Moriwaki (1)	Rakuten Seimei Park	9,987	63–58–15	L1
137	October 18	Fighters	0–5	Kato (5–7)	**Yuge** (1–1)	—	Rakuten Seimei Park	8,170	63–59–15	L2
138	October 19	@ Buffaloes	3–6	Tajima (8–8)	**Hayakawa** (9–7)	Yo. Hirano (28)	Kyocera Dome	11,274	63–60–15	L3
139	October 20	@ Buffaloes	5–2	**T. Norimoto** (11–5)	Tomiyama (2–1)	**Sung** (6)	Kyocera Dome	11,317	64–60–15	W1
140	October 23	Hawks	8–1	**Takinaka** (10–5)	Higashihama (4–4)	—	Rakuten Seimei Park	10,554	65–60–15	W2
141	October 24	Hawks	2–6	Kasaya (3–4)	**Kishi** (9–10)	—	Rakuten Seimei Park	11,275	65–61–15	L1
142	October 25	Hawks	0–4	Yamamoto (18–5)	**M. Tanaka** (4–9)	—	Rakuten Seimei Park	9,573	65–62–15	L2
143	October 27	Marines	2–1	**Sakai** (4–3)	C. Sasaki (8–1)	**Sung** (7)	Rakuten Seimei Park	11,074	66–62–15	W1

Win | Loss | Tie | Postponement | = Interleague play
**Bold** = Eagles team member

== Postseason ==
=== Game log ===
2021 postseason game log: 0–1–1 (Away: 0–1–1)
Climax Series first stage: 0–1–1 (Away: 0–1–1)

#	Date	Opponent	Score	Win	Loss	Save	Stadium	Attendance	Record	Streak
1	November 6	@ Marines	4–5	Masuda (1–0)	**Sung** (0–1)	—	Zozo Marine Stadium	14,904	0–1–0	L1
2	November 7	@ Marines	4–4	Game tied after 9 innings			Zozo Marine Stadium	14,891	0–1–1	T1

Win | Loss | Tie | Postponement
**Bold** = Eagles team member

== Roster ==
2021 Tohoku Rakuten Golden Eagles
**Roster**
**Pitchers**: 1 Yuki Matsui; 11 Takayuki Kishi; 13 Kohei Morihara; 14 Takahiro Norimoto; 16 Hideaki Wakui; 17 Takahiro Shiomi; 18 Masahiro Tanaka; 20 Tomohiro Anraku; 21 Takahisa Hayakawa; 22 Kazuhisa Makita; 23 Hayato Yuge; 28 Tomohito Sakai; 29 Koichi Takada; 31 Yuya Fukui; 32 Alan Busenitz; 40 Takuma Uchima; 41 Yoshinao Kamata; 43 Sung Chia-hao; 45 Yuki Watanabe; 52 Taisei Tsurusaki; 53 Hosei Takata; 56 Sora Suzuki; 57 Ryota Takinaka; 59 Shu Sugahara; 60 Ryota Ishibashi; 62 Naoto Nishiguchi; 64 Hiroyuki Fukuyama	**Catchers**: 2 Hikaru Ohta; 26 Ginjiro Sumitani; 44 Yuichi Adachi; 55 Takaya Tanaka; 67 Takahiro Shimotsuma; **Infielders**: 0 Hiroto Kobukata; 3 Hideto Asamura; 5 Eigoro Mogi; 7 Daichi Suzuki; 9 Brandon Dixon; 24 Fumiya Kurokawa; 30 Toshitake Yokoo; 33 Ginji Akaminai; 34 Tsuyoshi Yamasaki; 36 Yasuhito Uchida; 48 Yoshiaki Watanabe; 66 Itsuki Murabayashi	**Outfielders**: 4 Louis Okoye; 8 Ryosuke Tatsumi; 12 Rusney Castillo; 25 Kazuki Tanaka; 27 Takero Okajima; 35 Hiroaki Shimauchi; 38 Masaki Iwami; 46 Ko Shimozuru; 50 Atsuki Mutoh; 51 Yuya Ogo; 54 Ren Wada	**Manager**: 99 Kazuhisa Ishii; **Coaches**: 89 Yasunaga Makishi (head); 81 Eiji Kanamori (hitting); 74 Naoto Watanabe (hitting); 96 Teppei Tsuchiya (hitting); 80 Takashi Ishii (pitching); 75 Shinichiro Koyama (pitching); 90 Hidekazu Mitsuyama (battery/defense strategy); 95 Hiroshi Narahara (infield defense); 76 Yoshifumi Okada (outfield defense)

== Player statistics ==
=== Batting ===
2021 Tohoku Rakuten Golden Eagles batting statistics
Player	G	AB	R	H	2B	3B	HR	RBI	SB	BB	K	AVG	OBP	SLG	TB
Yuichi Adachi	10	17	0	1	1	0	0	1	0	1	2	.059	.111	.118	2
Ginji Akaminai	35	91	5	26	1	0	0	3	0	14	11	.286	.381	.297	27
Hideto Asamura	143	483	70	130	18	1	18	67	1	**101**	96	.269	.395	.422	204
Rusney Castillo	33	71	4	16	1	0	1	3	0	4	17	.225	.276	.282	20
Brandon Dixon	38	108	6	18	3	1	4	15	2	12	42	.167	.268	.324	35
Takahisa Hayakawa	24	3	0	0	0	0	0	0	0	0	1	.000	.000	.000	0
Masaki Iwami	4	7	1	1	1	0	0	0	0	1	3	.143	.250	.286	2
Takayuki Kishi	25	2	0	0	0	0	0	0	0	0	1	.000	.000	.000	0
Hiroto Kobukata	121	391	60	97	10	3	3	21	5	44	65	.248	.328	.312	122
Fumiya Kurokawa	34	75	4	14	2	0	1	8	0	3	17	.187	.228	.253	19
Eigoro Mogi	120	410	50	106	19	4	14	53	6	48	107	.259	.343	.427	175
Itsuki Murabayashi	79	40	3	6	1	0	1	4	4	2	8	.150	.191	.250	10
Atsuki Mutoh	44	19	4	2	0	1	0	0	4	0	8	.105	.105	.211	4
Takahiro Norimoto	23	4	0	0	0	0	0	0	0	0	2	.000	.000	.000	0
Yuya Ogo	38	77	6	14	3	1	2	6	1	6	23	.182	.259	.325	25
Hikaru Ohta	107	240	25	45	4	0	4	23	1	17	64	.188	.260	.254	61
Takero Okajima	126	461	40	129	30	4	8	56	3	28	94	.280	.331	.414	191
Louis Okoye	42	94	7	21	1	0	0	6	3	8	21	.223	.291	.234	22
Hiroaki Shimauchi	141	486	64	125	34	5	21	**96**	2	97	87	.257	.385	.477	232
Takahiro Shimotsuma	16	23	2	4	0	0	0	2	0	4	5	.174	.296	.174	4
Ko Shimozuru	6	10	0	1	0	0	0	0	0	0	4	.100	.100	.100	1
Takahiro Shiomi	1	2	0	0	0	0	0	0	0	0	1	.000	.000	.000	0
Ginjiro Sumitani^{†}	51	105	11	23	3	0	3	8	0	7	24	.219	.272	.333	35
Daichi Suzuki	**143**	552	70	153	19	3	10	53	3	52	51	.277	.343	.377	208
Ryota Takinaka	20	5	0	0	0	0	0	0	0	0	4	.000	.000	.000	0
Kazuki Tanaka	61	59	5	8	0	0	0	3	0	7	16	.136	.239	.136	8
Masahiro Tanaka	23	2	0	1	0	0	0	0	0	0	1	.500	.500	.500	1
Takaya Tanaka	31	38	2	10	2	0	2	3	0	3	9	.263	.317	.474	18
Ryosuke Tatsumi	130	374	49	84	13	1	10	32	6	51	99	.225	.326	.345	129
Yasuhito Uchida	25	54	2	11	2	0	1	11	0	1	19	.204	.220	.296	16
Ren Wada	7	8	0	2	0	0	0	0	0	1	4	.250	.333	.250	2
Hideaki Wakui	21	2	0	0	0	0	0	0	0	0	1	.000	.000	.000	0
Yoshiaki Watanabe	45	99	12	27	2	0	1	7	0	11	19	.273	.351	.323	32
Tsuyoshi Yamasaki	56	168	29	43	6	3	4	24	4	15	41	.256	.326	.399	67
Toshitake Yokoo	30	61	1	11	2	0	0	3	0	0	8	.180	.254	.213	13
Total：35 players	143	4,641	532	1,129	178	27	108	508	45	538	975	.243	.329	.363	1,685

^{†}Denotes player joined the team mid-season. Stats reflect time with the Eagles only.
^{‡}Denotes player left the team mid-season. Stats reflect time with the Eagles only.
Bold/italics denotes best in the league

=== Pitching ===
2021 Tohoku Rakuten Golden Eagles pitching statistics
Player	W	L	ERA	G	GS	SV	IP	H	R	ER	BB	K
Tomohiro Anraku	3	3	2.08	58	0	2	56.1	45	13	13	33	50
Alan Busenitz	1	0	4.97	31	0	0	29	32	16	16	9	23
Yuya Fukui	0	0	4.43	19	0	0	20.1	17	10	10	6	21
Hiroyuki Fukuyama	0	2	2.38	24	0	0	22.2	23	6	6	12	13
Takahisa Hayakawa	9	7	3.86	24	23	0	137.2	132	59	59	30	127
Ryota Ishibashi	0	1	3.46	3	3	0	13	12	5	5	6	4
Yoshinao Kamata	0	0	11.25	1	1	0	4	8	5	5	1	2
Takayuki Kishi	9	**10**	3.44	25	25	0	149	149	62	57	34	131
Kazuhisa Makita	0	0	3.31	17	0	0	16.1	17	10	6	3	5
Yuki Matsui	0	2	0.63	43	0	24	43	22	3	3	21	59
Kohei Morihara	0	0	2.78	34	0	0	32.1	29	10	10	8	30
Naoto Nishiguchi	5	2	3.28	33	1	0	57.2	46	23	21	23	55
Takahiro Norimoto	11	5	3.17	23	23	0	144.2	123	56	51	35	152
Tomohito Sakai	4	3	2.28	54	0	3	51.1	33	15	13	24	44
Takahiro Shiomi	0	0	3.6	1	1	0	5	5	2	2	1	4
Shu Sugahara	0	0	16.88	1	0	0	2.2	2	5	5	5	0
Sung Chia-hao	3	3	2.23	63	0	7	60.2	46	18	15	23	49
Sora Suzuki	0	0	0	5	0	0	4.1	3	0	0	4	5
Koichi Takada	0	0	1.35	3	1	0	6.2	6	2	1	1	6
Hosei Takata	0	1	9.39	4	1	0	7.2	13	9	8	5	8
Ryota Takinaka	10	5	3.21	20	20	0	103.2	97	40	37	27	75
Masahiro Tanaka	4	9	3.01	23	23	0	155.2	131	54	52	29	126
Taisei Tsurusaki	0	0	5.06	11	0	0	10.2	11	6	6	5	7
Takuma Uchima	0	0	5.91	11	0	0	10.2	9	7	7	4	16
Hideaki Wakui	6	8	5.04	21	17	0	96.1	110	57	54	26	76
Yuki Watanabe	0	0	5.4	9	0	0	5	5	3	3	2	4
Hayato Yuge	1	1	7.24	5	4	0	13.2	20	11	11	6	6
Total：27 players	66	62	3.40	566	143	36	1,260	1,146	507	476	383	1,098

^{†}Denotes player joined the team mid-season. Stats reflect time with the Eagles only.
^{‡}Denotes player left the team mid-season. Stats reflect time with the Eagles only.
Bold/italics denotes best in the league

== Awards and honors ==
Taiju Life Monthly MVP Award

- Hideaki Wakui - March/April (pitcher)

All-Star Series selections

- Hideto Asamura - second baseman
- Hiroto Kobukata - infielder
- Yuki Matsui - closing pitcher
- Takahiro Norimoto - pitcher
- Hiroaki Shimauchi - outfielder
- Sung Chia-hao - pitcher
- Masahiro Tanaka - pitcher

All-Star Series MVP

- Hiroaki Shimauchi - Game 2

== Farm team ==
2021 Eastern League regular season standings
Pos	Team	G	W	L	T	Pct.	GB	Home	Road
1	Chiba Lotte Marines	108	60	42	6	.588	—	33–20–2	27–22–4
2	Yomiuri Giants	116	56	57	3	.496	9½	33–29	23–28–3
**3**	**Tohoku Rakuten Golden Eagles**	**114**	**54**	**55**	**5**	**.4954**	**9½**	**28–27–3**	**26–28–2**
4	Tokyo Yakult Swallows	104	49	50	5	.4949	9½	24–21–5	25–29
5	Hokkaido Nippon-Ham Fighters	108	49	51	8	.490	10	31–19–2	18–32–6
6	Yokohama DeNA BayStars	111	51	55	5	.481	11	24–25–4	27–30–1
7	Saitama Seibu Lions	107	48	53	6	.475	11½	29–23–3	19–30–3

^{†} League champion

== Nippon Professional Baseball draft ==
2021 Tohoku Rakuten Golden Eagles draft selections
Round	Name	Position	Affiliation	Signed?
1	Soshi Yoshino	Outfielder	Shohei High School	Yes
2	Yuma Yasuda	Catcher	Aichi University	Yes
3	Ginji Maeda	Infielder	Mishima Minami High School	Yes
4	Katsutoshi Tai	Pitcher	Kamimura Gakuen High School	Yes
5	Tomotaka Matsui	Pitcher	Kanazawa Gakuin University	Yes
6	Masaya Nishigaki	Pitcher	Waseda University	Yes
7	Yudai Yoshikawa	Pitcher	JFE West	Yes
Development players
1	Satoshi Miyamori	Pitcher	Kochi Fighting Dogs	Yes
2	Ozora Yanagisawa	Outfield	Nihon University Fujisawa High School	Yes
3	Sho Okawara	Outfielder	Tokai University Yamagata High School	Yes
