= Yoshiaki Watanabe (baseball) =

Japanese baseball player (born 1997)

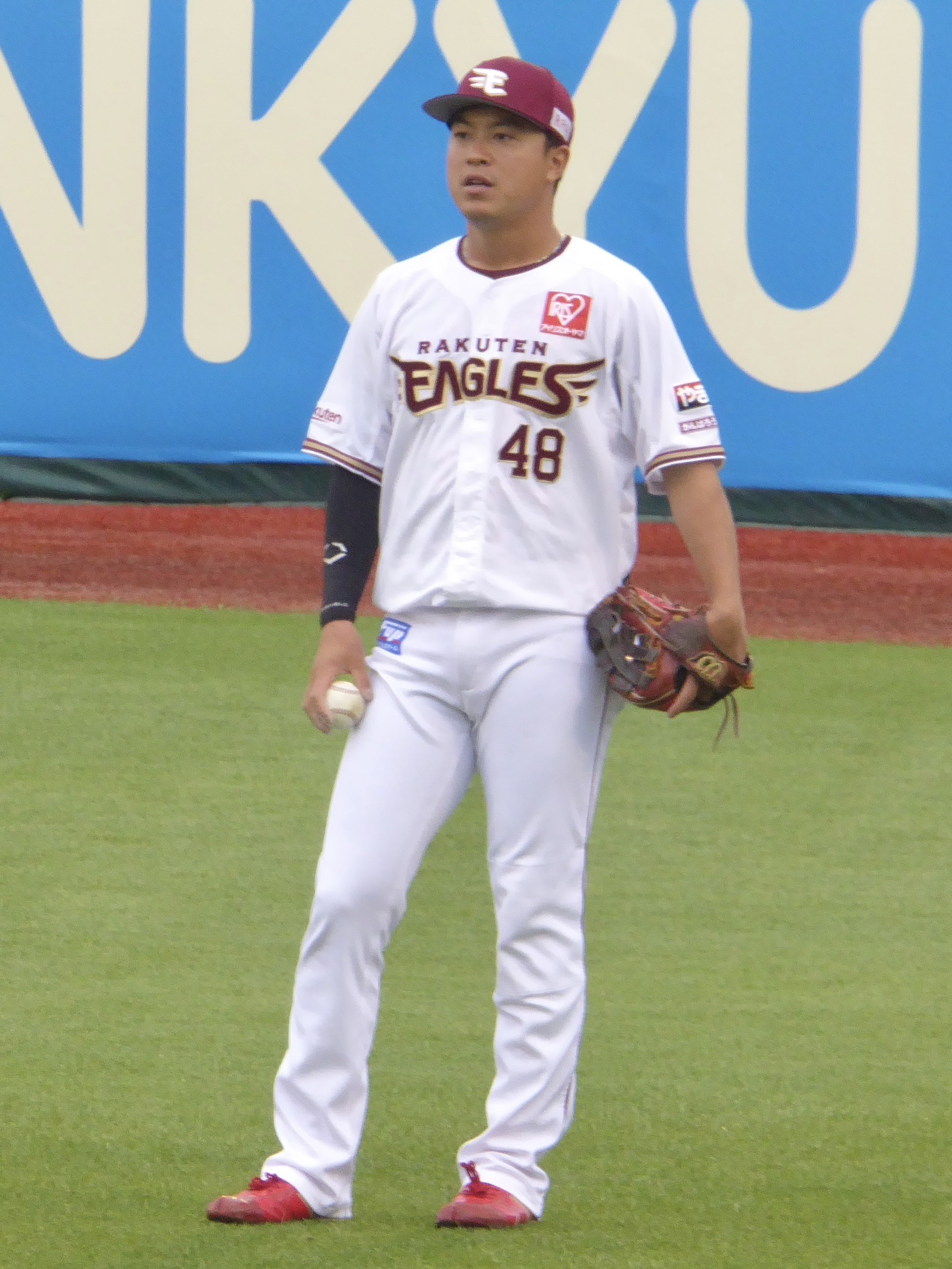
- Watanabe with the Eagles, June 10, 2023

Tohoku Rakuten Golden Eagles – No. 35
- Infielder, Outfielder
- Born: January 8, 1997 (age 29); Yokohama, Kanagawa, Japan
- Bats: Left Throws: Right

NPB debut
- May 21, 2019, for the Tohoku Rakuten Golden Eagles

NPB statistics (through 2025 season)
- Batting average: .242
- Hits: 215
- Home runs: 3
- Runs batted in: 95
- Stolen base: 2
- Stats at Baseball Reference

Teams
- Tohoku Rakuten Golden Eagles (2019–present)

Yoshiaki Watanabe (渡邊 佳明, Watanabe Yoshiaki; born January 8, 1997 in Yokohama, Kanagawa, Japan) is a professional Japanese baseball player. He plays infield and outfield for the Tohoku Rakuten Golden Eagles.

== Early baseball career ==
Because his grandfather, Motonori, was the coach of the Yokohama High School baseball team, he lived in the dormitory from a young age. He started playing baseball in the second grade of elementary school, played for the Yokohama BayStars Junior team in the sixth grade, and joined the Nakahonmoku Little Seniors in junior high.

He entered Yokohama High School, where his grandfather was the coach, and played first base as his team participated twice in the Koshien Tournaments.

He entered Meiji University. In his second year, he played third base and contributed to the team's consecutive spring and fall championships in the Tokyo Big6 Baseball League. In his fourth year, when he switched to shortstop, he was selected for the Best Nine in both the spring and fall seasons, and in his final season, the fall league, he won the batting title with a batting average of .420. He joined the national team to compete at the Baseball at the 2017 Summer Universiade and the 2018 Haarlem Baseball Week.

== Professional career ==
=== Tohoku Rakuten Golden Eagles ===
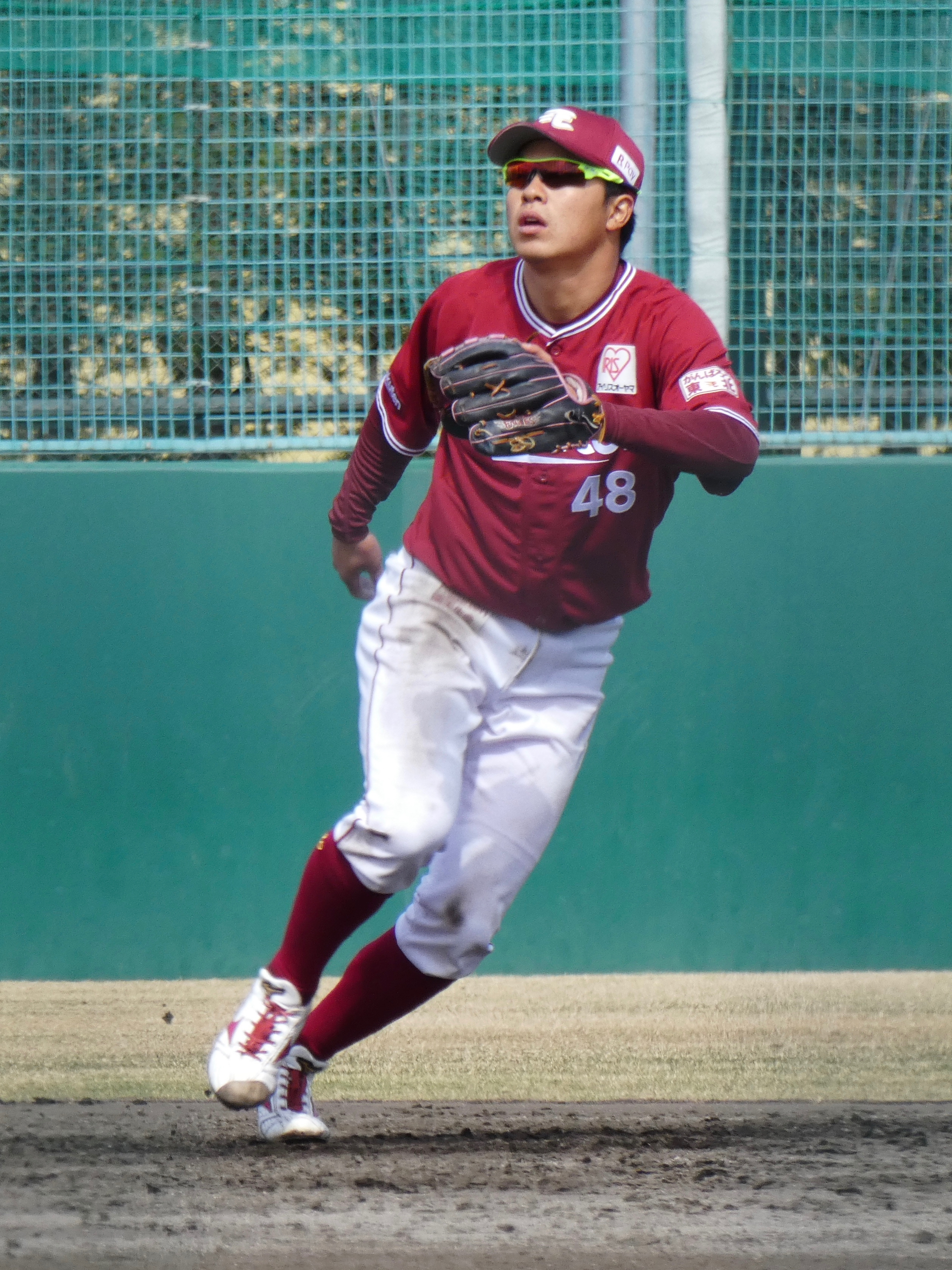
Watanabe with the Eagles, April 11, 2019

He was the Tohoku Rakuten Golden Eagles' 6th round pick in the 2018 Nippon Professional Baseball draft. He inked a 30 million yen contract with the Eagles for a 7.5 million yen annual salary. He was assigned the jersey number 48.

=== 2019 ===
On May 21st, in a game against the Hokkaido Nippon-Ham Fighters (at Sapporo Dome), he made his professional debut as a pinch runner for Toshiaki Imae in the top of the 9th inning. In the game on May 23rd, he made his first professional start as third baseman, and in his second at-bat in the top of the 5th inning, he got his first professional hit off Toshihiro Sugiura. On August 24, in a game against the Saitama Seibu Lions (at MetLife Dome), he hit his first professional home run.

=== 2022 ===
On April 10th, in a game against the Hokkaido Nippon-Ham Fighters (at Sapporo Dome), he recorded his first professional stolen base. In the minor leagues, he recorded a good batting average of .383 and participated in the Farm Japan Championship held on October 8th, where he had a great performance with 3 hits in 5 at-bats, including a game-winning RBI, and 2 RBIs, earning him the MVP award and contributing to the team's victory.

=== 2023 ===
He played in 77 games in the minor leagues, achieving impressive batting averages of .372 and on-base percentages of .437, which earned him the batting title and the highest on-base percentage.

=== 2025 ===
In the game against the Fukuoka SoftBank Hawks on April 27th (at Rakuten Mobile Park Miyagi), he came in as a pinch hitter in the 11th inning with no outs and the bases loaded, and hit a walk-off RBI single over left field off of Yuki Tsumori. On May 13, in a game against the Chiba Lotte Marines (at Rakuten Mobile Park Miyagi), he came in as a pinch hitter in the 9th inning with one out and runners on first and third base, and hit a walk-off sacrifice fly to left field off Tayron Guerrero. During the offseason, following the release of Hiroaki Shimauchi, a senior from Meiji University, he changed his jersey number from 48 to 35, the same number Shimauchi had worn until that year.
