= Hiroto Kobukata =

Japanese baseball player (born 1995)

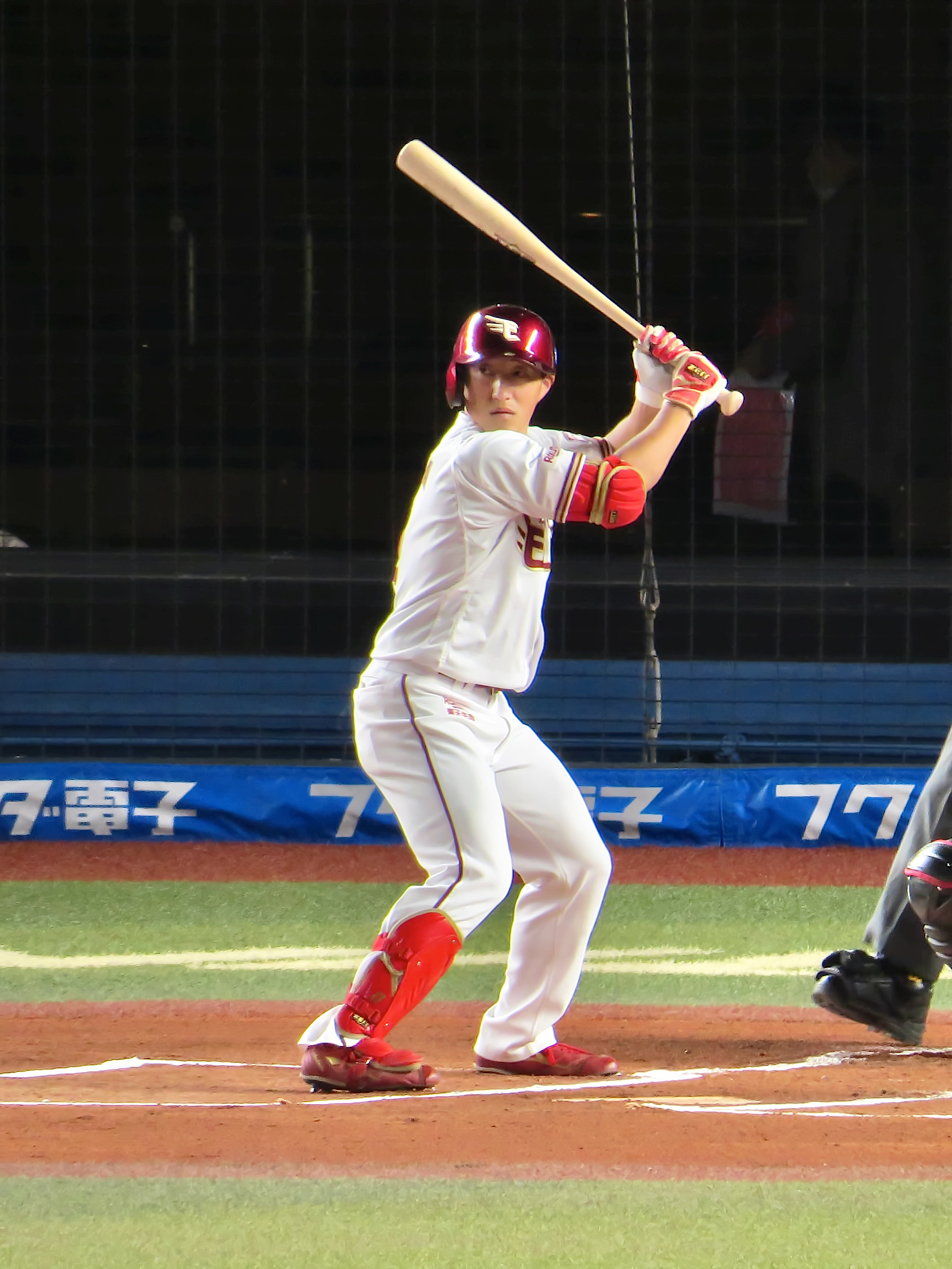

Tohoku Rakuten Golden Eagles – No. 0
- Infielder
- Born: September 28, 1995 (age 30); Sayō, Hyōgo, Japan
- Bats: Left Throws: Right

NPB debut
- June 19, 2020, for the Tohoku Rakuten Golden Eagles

NPB statistics (through 2025 season)
- Batting average: .252
- Home runs: 17
- RBIs: 155
- Hits: 610
- Stolen bases: 136
- Sacrifice bunts: 100
- Stats at Baseball Reference

Teams
- Tohoku Rakuten Golden Eagles (2020–present)

Career highlights and awards
- 3× NPB All-Star (2021–2023); Pacific League Stolen bases Leader (2023); 1× Pacific League Best Nine Award (2024); 1× Mitsui Golden Glove Award (2024)

Hiroto Kobukata (小深田 大翔, Kobukata Hiroto; born September 28, 1995) is a professional Japanese baseball player. He plays infielder for the Tohoku Rakuten Golden Eagles of Nippon Professional Baseball (NPB).

== Career ==
In the 2023 NPB season, Kobukata tied Ukyo Shuto with 36 stolen bases and won the Pacific League Stolen bases Leader Award.
