= Fumiya Motomae =

Japanese baseball player (born 1997)

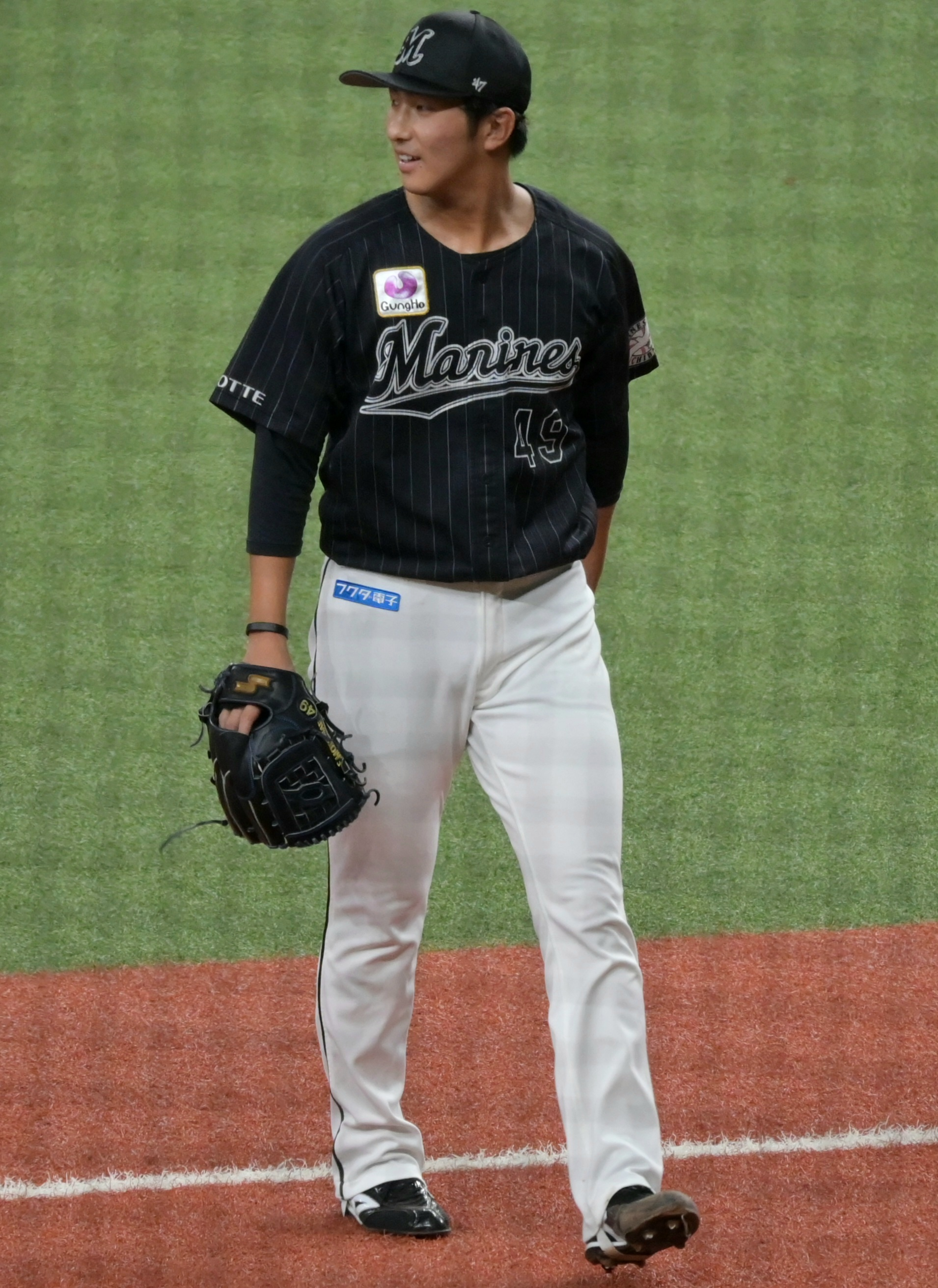

Chiba Lotte Marines – No. 121
- Pitcher
- Born: October 2, 1997 (age 28); Sapporo, Hokkaido, Japan
- Bats: Left Throws: Left

NPB debut
- April 1, 2021, for the Chiba Lotte Marines

Career statistics (through 2022 season)
- Win–loss record: 4–4
- Earned run average: 4.71
- Strikeouts: 57
- Holds: 0
- Saves: 0

Teams
- Chiba Lotte Marines (2021–present)

Fumiya Motomae (本前 郁也, Motomae Fumiya; born October 2, 1997) is a professional Japanese baseball player. He is a pitcher for the Chiba Lotte Marines of Nippon Professional Baseball (NPB).
