= Yūichi Adachi =

Japanese baseball player (born 1989)

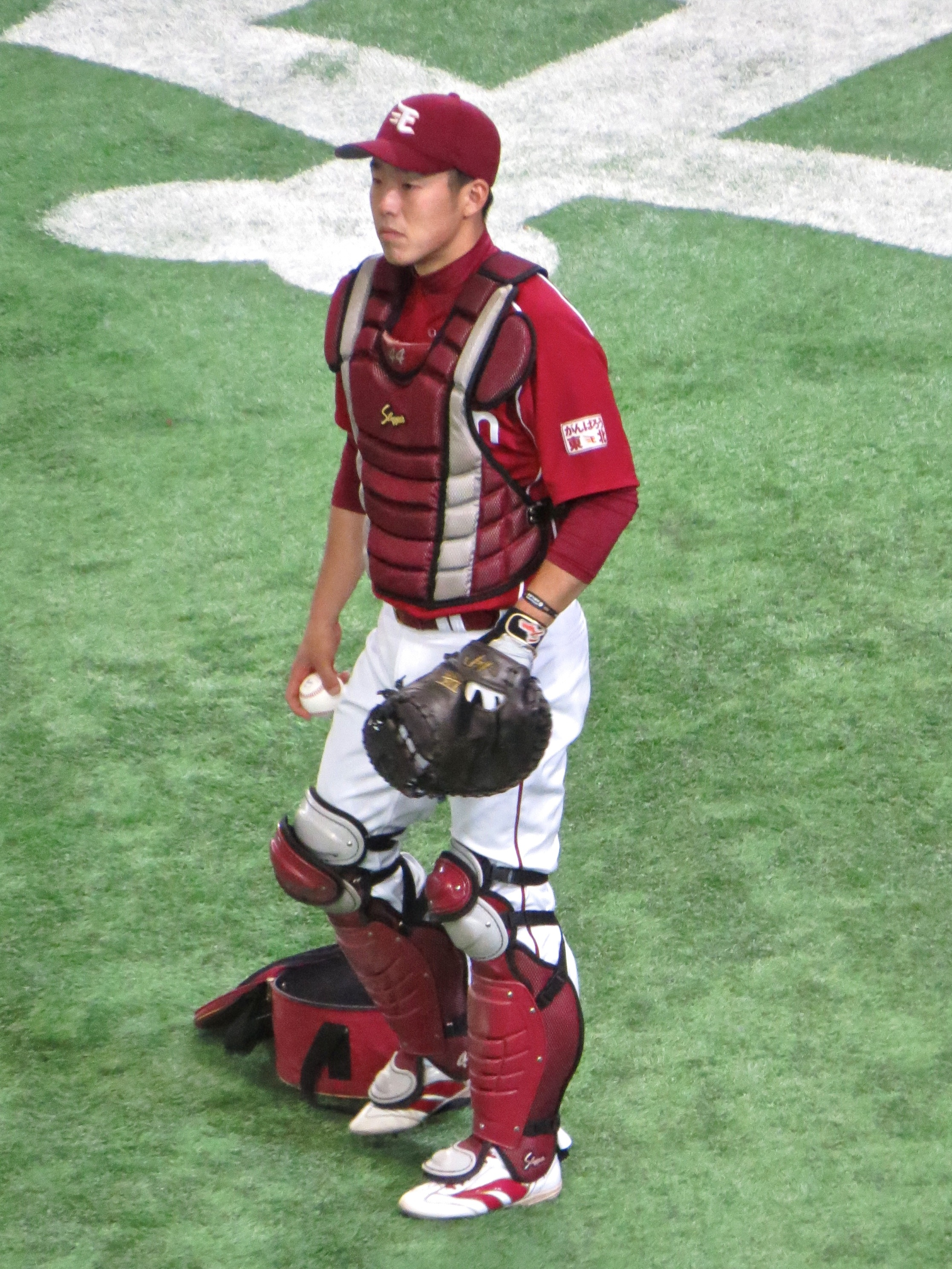
- Catcher
- Born: September 22, 1989 (age 36); Machida, Tokyo, Japan
- Batted: Right Threw: Right

NPB debut
- May 21, 2016, for the Tohoku Rakuten Golden Eagles

Last NPB appearance
- July 4, 2021, for the Tohoku Rakuten Golden Eagles

NPB statistics (through 2021 season)
- Batting average: .195
- Hits: 77
- Home runs: 5
- Runs batted in: 29
- Stolen base: 0

Teams
- Tohoku Rakuten Golden Eagles (2016–2021)

Yūichi Adachi (足立 祐一, Adachi Yūichi; born September 22, 1989 in Machida, Tokyo, Japan) is a professional Japanese baseball player. He plays catcher for the Tohoku Rakuten Golden Eagles.
