= Takahide Ikeda =

Japanese baseball player (born 1994)

Takahide Ikeda 池田 隆英
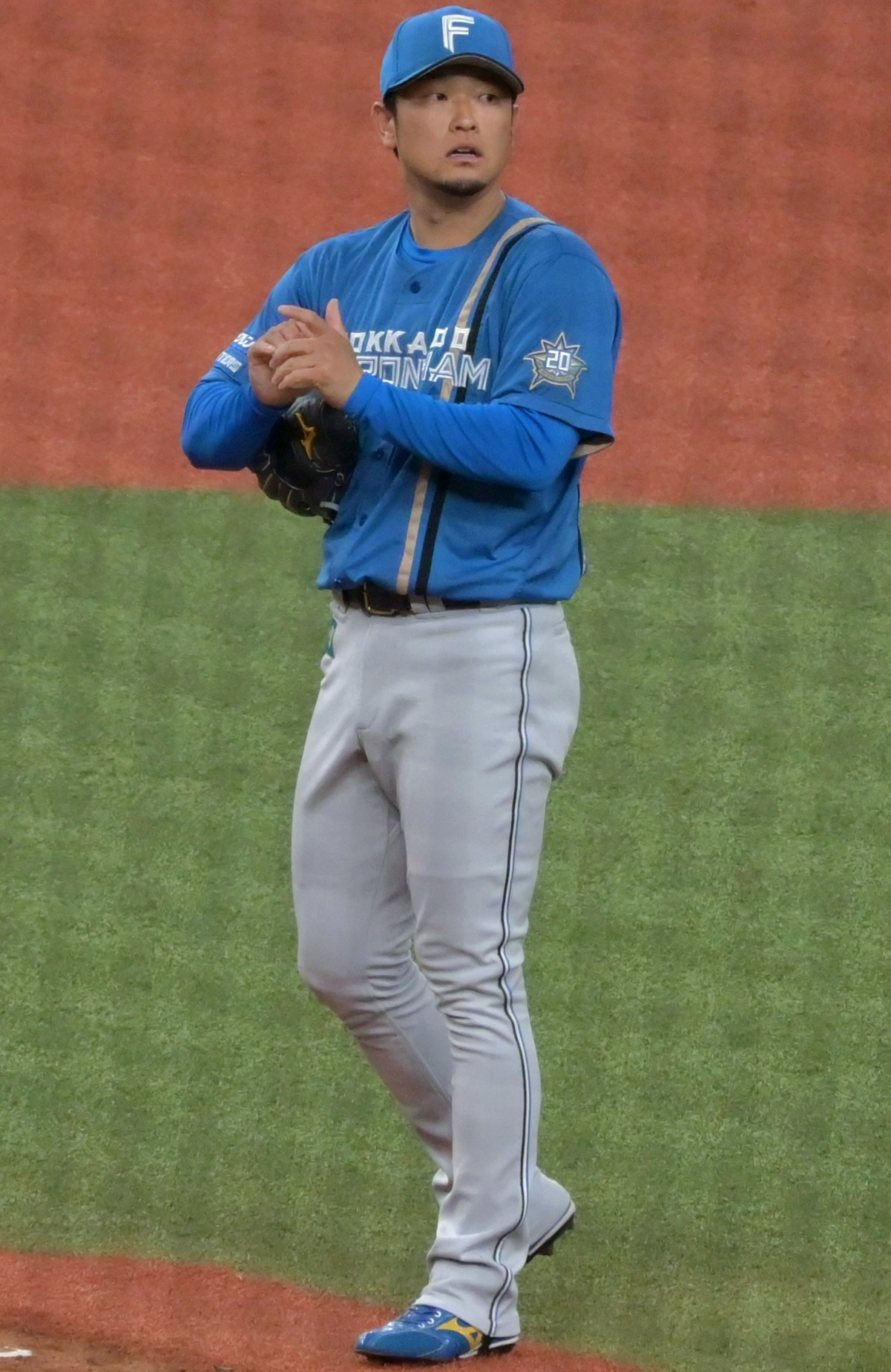

Hokkaido Nippon-Ham Fighters – No. 52
- Pitcher
- Born: October 1, 1994 (age 31); Karatsu, Saga, Japan
- Bats: Right Throws: Right

NPB debut
- April 1, 2018, for the Tohoku Rakuten Golden Eagles

Career statistics (through 2024 season)
- Win–loss record: 8-24
- Earned Run Average: 4.01
- Strikeouts: 154
- Saves: 0
- Holds: 45

Teams
- Tohoku Rakuten Golden Eagles (2019–2020); Hokkaido Nippon-Ham Fighters (2021–present)

Takahide Ikeda (池田 隆英, Ikeda Takahide; born October 1, 1994 in Karatsu, Saga, Japan) is a Japanese professional baseball pitcher for the Hokkaido Nippon-Ham Fighters of Nippon Professional Baseball (NPB).
