= Takashi Ogino =

Japanese baseball player (born 1985)

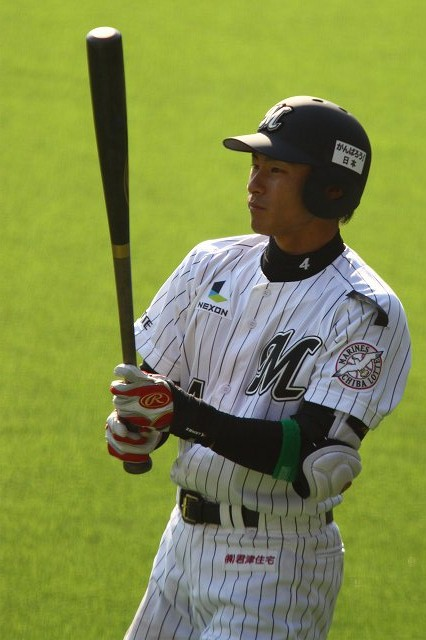
- Ogino with the Chiba Lotte Marines

Chiba Lotte Marines – No. 0
- Outfielder/Shortstop
- Born: October 21, 1985 (age 40)
- Bats: Right Throws: Right

NPB debut
- March 20, 2010, for the Chiba Lotte Marines

NPB statistics (through 2020 season)
- Batting average: .280
- Hits: 774
- Home runs: 32
- RBI: 214
- Stolen bases: 220
- Stats at Baseball Reference

Teams
- Chiba Lotte Marines (2010 - 2025)

Career highlights and awards
- 1× Pacific League Best Nine Award (2019); 1× Pacific League Golden Glove Award (2019); 1× Japan Series champion (2010); 3× NPB All-Star (2018, 2019, 2021)

Takashi Ogino (荻野 貴司, born October 21, 1985, in Asuka, Nara) is a Japanese professional baseball outfielder and shortstop for the Chiba Lotte Marines in Japan's Nippon Professional Baseball.

He was selected to the 2018 NPB All-Star game.
