= Yutaro Watanabe =

Japanese baseball player (born 2000)

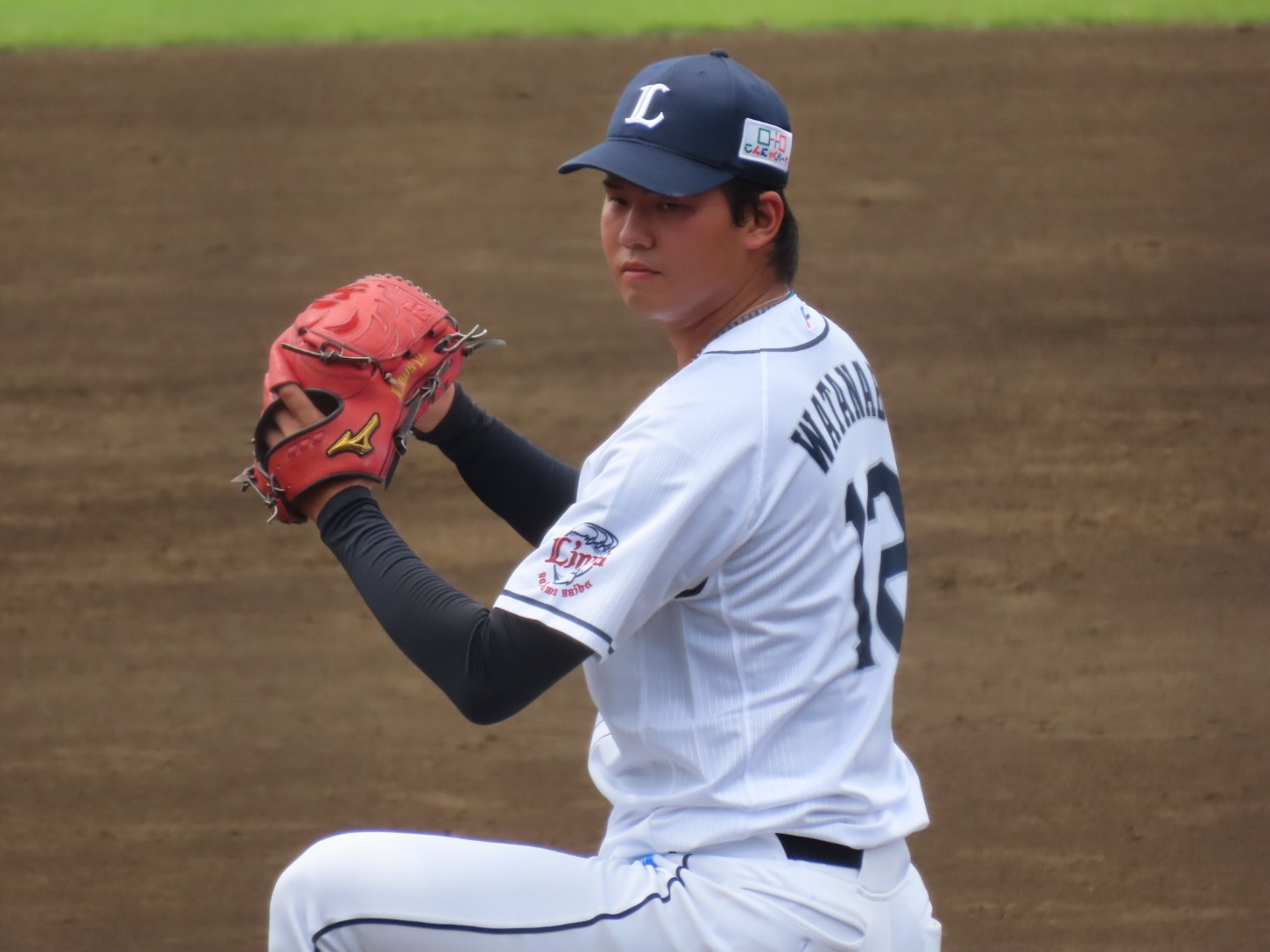

Saitama Seibu Lions – No. 12
- Pitcher
- Born: September 21, 2000 (age 25); Hanyū, Saitama, Japan
- Bats: Right Throws: Right

NPB debut
- June 9, 2021, for the Saitama Seibu Lions

Career statistics (through April 3, 2022)
- Win–loss record: 4–5
- Earned run average: 3.98
- Strikeouts: 36
- Stats at Baseball Reference

Teams
- Saitama Seibu Lions (2021–present)

Yutaro Watanabe (渡邉 勇太朗, Watanabe Yutaro; born September 21, 2000, in Hanyū, Saitama, Japan) is a professional Japanese baseball player. He is a pitcher for the Saitama Seibu Lions of Nippon Professional Baseball (NPB).
