= Naoyuki Uwasawa =

Japanese baseball player (born 1994)

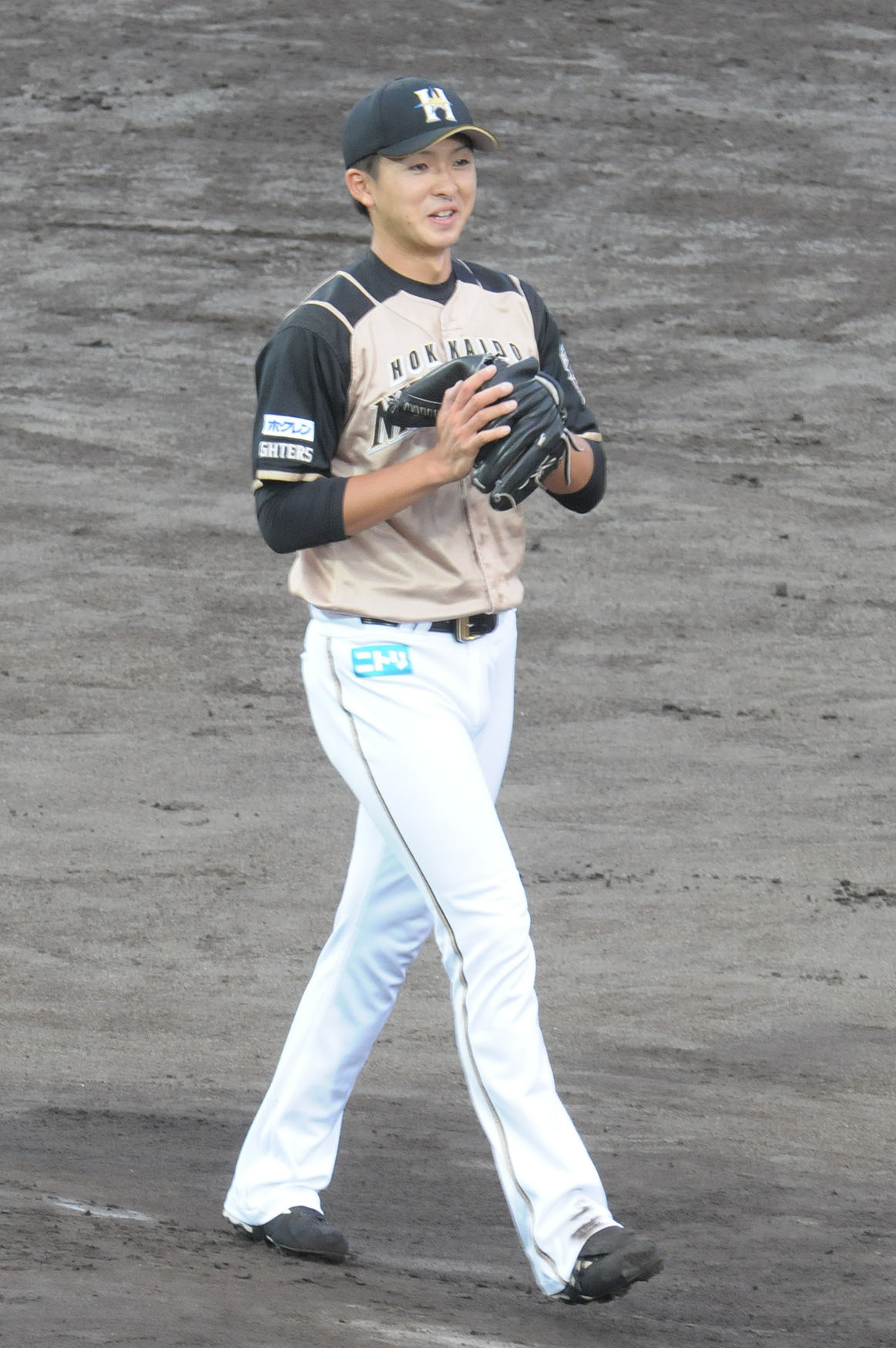
- Uwasawa with the Fighters

Fukuoka SoftBank Hawks – No. 10
- Pitcher
- Born: February 6, 1994 (age 32); Matsudo, Japan
- Bats: Right Throws: Right

Professional debut
- NPB: April 2, 2014, for the Hokkaido Nippon-Ham Fighters
- MLB: May 2, 2024, for the Boston Red Sox

NPB statistics (through August 21, 2026)
- Win–loss record: 89–72
- Earned run average: 3.11
- Strikeouts: 1,115

MLB statistics (through 2024 season)
- Win–loss record: 0–0
- Earned run average: 2.25
- Strikeouts: 3
- Stats at Baseball Reference

Teams
- Hokkaido Nippon-Ham Fighters (2014–2023); Boston Red Sox (2024); Fukuoka SoftBank Hawks (2025–present)

Career highlights and awards
- 3× NPB All-Star (2018, 2021, 2023); 2× Japan Series champion (2016, 2025)
Medals
Men's baseball
Representing Japan
21U Baseball World Cup
Silver medal – second place	2014 Taichung	Team

Naoyuki Uwasawa (上沢 直之, Uwasawa Naoyuki; born February 6, 1994) is a Japanese professional baseball pitcher for the Fukuoka SoftBank Hawks of Nippon Professional Baseball (NPB). He has previously played in NPB for the Hokkaido Nippon-Ham Fighters and in Major League Baseball (MLB) for the Boston Red Sox.

== Career ==
=== Hokkaido Nippon-Ham Fighters ===
Uwasawa debuted for the Hokkaido Nippon-Ham Fighters in 2014. He was selected to the 2018 NPB All-Star game. On October 10, 2018, he was selected Japan national baseball team at the 2018 MLB Japan All-Star Series.

After the 2023 season, the Fighters posted Uwasawa to Major League Baseball teams.

=== Boston Red Sox ===
On January 11, 2024, Uwasawa signed a minor league contract with the Tampa Bay Rays. On March 27, after triggering an assignment clause in his contract, he was traded to the Boston Red Sox in exchange for cash considerations. The next day, he was selected to the 40-man roster and optioned to extended spring training. On April 28, Uwasawa was recalled from the Triple-A Worcester Red Sox and promoted to the majors for the first time. On May 2, Uwasawa made his MLB debut, pitching two innings in a game against the San Francisco Giants; he collected his first MLB strikeout, against Michael Conforto. Uwasawa was optioned to Triple–A on May 8. Uwasawa was designated for assignment by the Red Sox on July 9. He cleared waivers and was sent outright to Worcester on July 13. Uwasawa elected free agency on October 31.

=== Fukuoka SoftBank Hawks ===
On December 18, 2024, Uwasawa signed a four–year contract with the Fukuoka SoftBank Hawks of Nippon Professional Baseball. He made 23 appearances for Fukuoka in 2025, logging a 12–6 record and 2.74 ERA with 115 strikeouts across 144 2/3 innings pitched. With the Hawks, Uwasawa won the 2025 Japan Series.
