= Sung Chia-hao =

Taiwanese baseball player (born 1992)

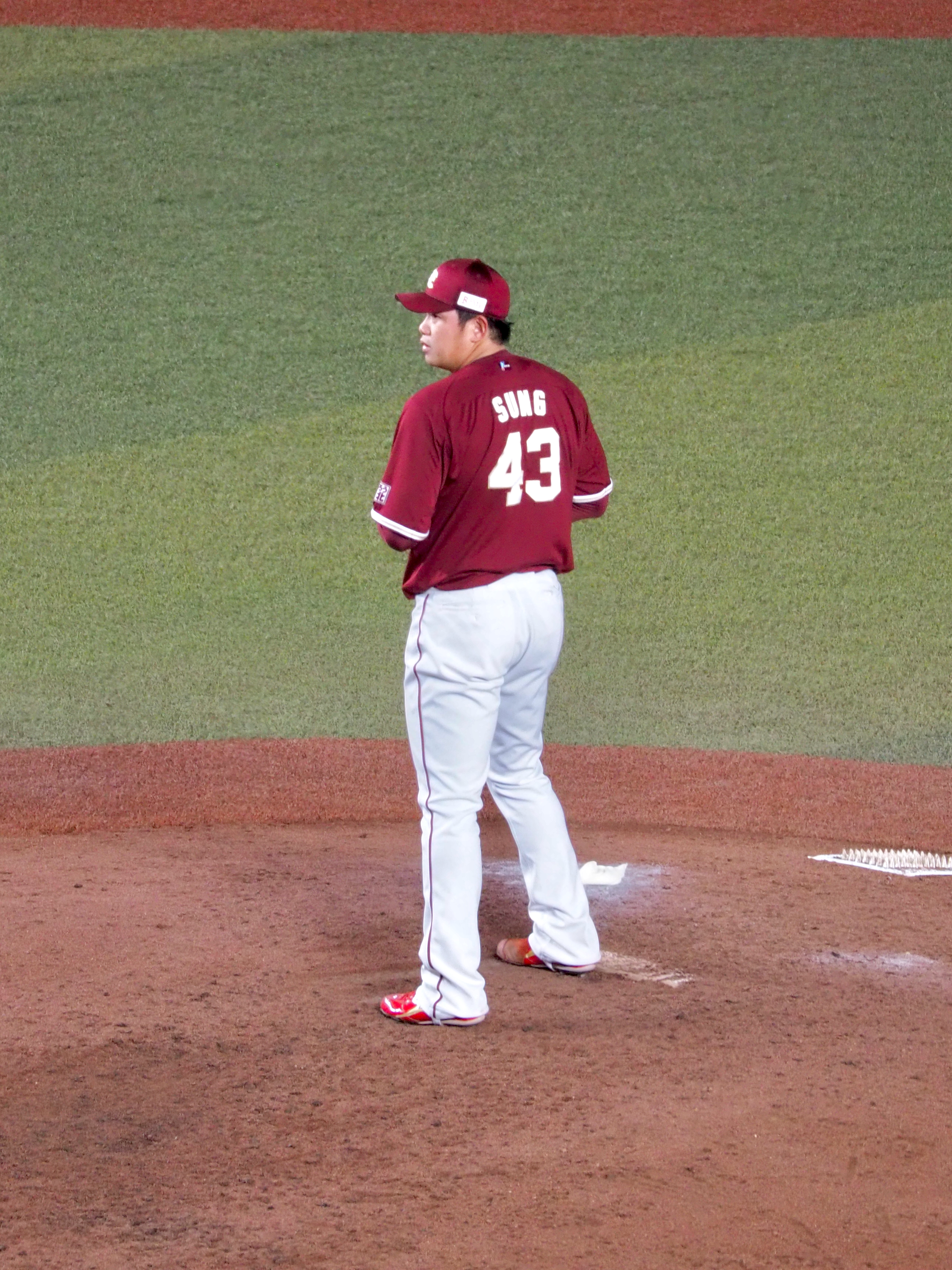
- Sung with the Eagles

Tohoku Rakuten Golden Eagles – No. 43
- Pitcher
- Born: 6 September 1992 (age 33); Taitung County, Taiwan
- Bats: Left Throws: Right

NPB debut
- August 11, 2017, for the Tohoku Rakuten Golden Eagles

NPB statistics (through April 5, 2026)
- Win–loss record: 21–15
- Earned run average: 2.99
- Strikeouts: 264
- Saves: 8
- Holds: 122
- Stats at Baseball Reference

Teams
- Tohoku Rakuten Golden Eagles (2017–present)

Career highlights and awards
- NPB All-Star (2021)

Sung Chia-hao (Chinese: 宋家豪; born 6 September 1992) is a Taiwanese professional baseball pitcher for the Tohoku Rakuten Golden Eagles of Nippon Professional Baseball (NPB). He attended National Taiwan Sport University.

== Career ==
On October 20, 2015, Sung signed with the Tohoku Rakuten Golden Eagles of the Nippon Professional Baseball(NPB).

On December 3, 2019, Sung signed a 1-year extension to remain with the Eagles.

== International career ==
Sung represented Taiwan at the 2014 21U Baseball World Cup, 2014 Asian Games, 2015 Universiade, 2015 WBSC Premier12 2017 World Baseball Classic, and 2023 World Baseball Classic.
