= Kazuaki Tateno =

Japanese baseball player

- Pitcher
- Born: April 3, 1998 (age 28); Toyoyama, Nishikasugai, Aichi
- Batted: Right Threw: Right

NPB debut
- June 5, 2021, for the Hokkaido Nippon-Ham Fighters

Last NPB appearance
- August 9, 2023, for the Hokkaido Nippon-Ham Fighters

Career statistics
- Win–loss record: 5-6
- Earned Run Average: 3.89
- Strikeouts: 58
- Stats at Baseball Reference

Teams
- Hokkaido Nippon-Ham Fighters (2021-2023)

Kazuaki Tateno (立野 和明, Tateno Kazuaki; born April 3, 1998) is a professional Japanese baseball player. He is a pitcher for the Hokkaido Nippon-Ham Fighters of Nippon Professional Baseball (NPB).
