= Kazuya Ojima =

Japanese baseball player (born 1996)

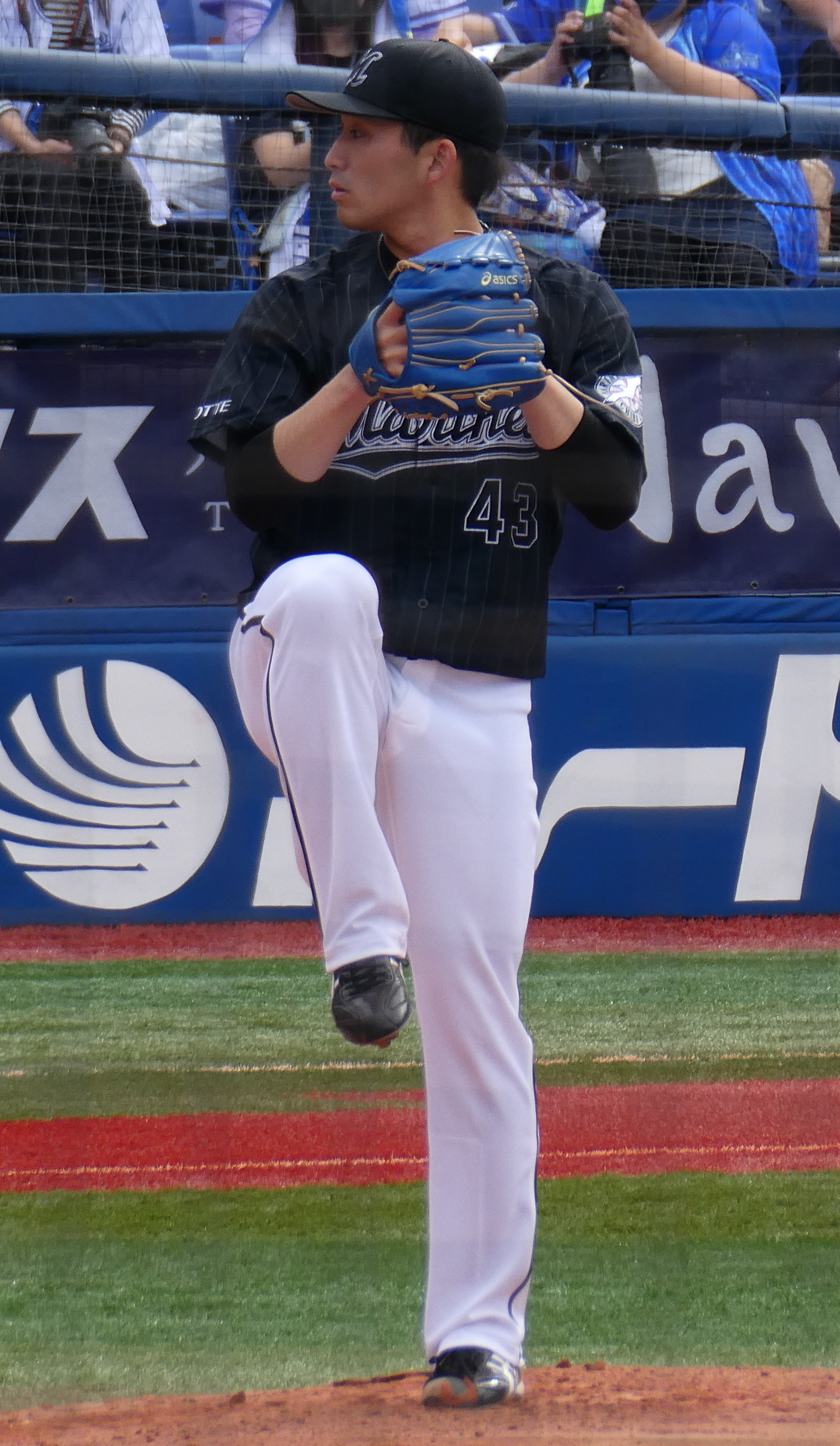

Chiba Lotte Marines – No. 14
- Pitcher
- Born: July 7, 1996 (age 30); Kōnosu, Saitama, Japan
- Bats: Left Throws: Left

NPB debut
- April 4, 2019, for the Chiba Lotte Marines

Career statistics (through 2023 season)
- Win–loss record: 33-34
- Earned Run Average: 3.58
- Strikeouts: 423
- Saves: 0
- Stats at Baseball Reference

Teams
- Chiba Lotte Marines (2019–present)

Kazuya Ojima (小島 和哉, Ojima Kazuya; born July 7, 1996) is a professional Japanese baseball player. He plays pitcher for the Chiba Lotte Marines of Nippon Professional Baseball (NPB).
