= Bryan Rodriguez (baseball) =

Dominican baseball player (born 1991)

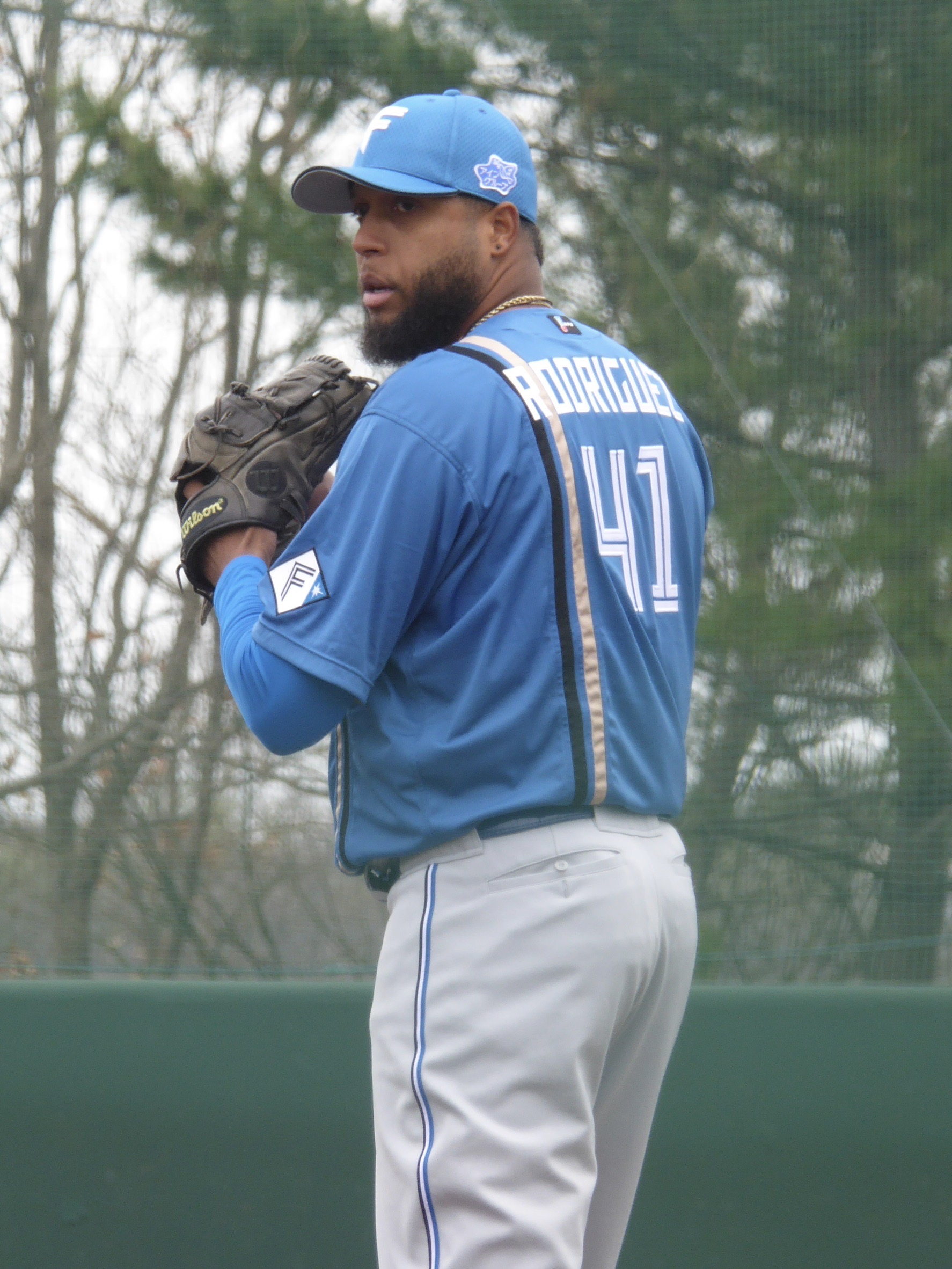
- Rodriguez with the Hokkaido Nippon-Ham Fighters in 2024

Free agent
- Pitcher
- Born: July 6, 1991 (age 34); San Pedro de Macorís, Dominican Republic
- Bats: Right Throws: Right

NPB debut
- March 30, 2018, for the Hokkaido Nippon-Ham Fighters

NPB statistics (through 2024 season)
- Win–loss record: 14-21
- Earned run average: 3.59
- Strikeouts: 157
- Stats at Baseball Reference

Teams
- Hokkaido Nippon-Ham Fighters (2018–2024)

Bryan De Jesus Rodriguez Guillen (born July 6, 1991) is a Dominican professional baseball pitcher who is a free agent. He has previously played in Nippon Professional Baseball (NPB) for the Hokkaido Nippon-Ham Fighters.

== Career ==
=== San Diego Padres ===
On May 29, 2010, Rodriguez signed with the San Diego Padres organization as an international free agent. He made his professional debut for the Dominican Summer League Padres and did not play in a game in 2011. Rodriguez split the 2012 season between the rookie-level Arizona League Padres and the Low-A Eugene Emeralds, accumulating a 6.46 ERA in 13 appearances. In 2013, Rodriguez spent the year in Single-A with the Fort Wayne TinCaps, pitching to a 2-8 record and 3.19 ERA in 19 games. He spent the 2014 season with the High-A Lake Elsinore Storm, recording a 8-9 record and 4.16 ERA with 104 strikeouts in 149 1/3 innings of work.

Rodriguez split the 2015 season between the Double-A San Antonio Missions and the Triple-A El Paso Chihuahuas, posting a 7-16 record and 4.88 ERA in 145 2/3 innings pitched. He split the 2016 season between El Paso and San Antonio, pitching to a 7-13 record and 4.46 ERA in 26 appearances. Rodriguez again played for El Paso and San Antonio in 2017, registering an 8-8 record and 4.76 ERA with 68 strikeouts. He elected free agency following the season on November 6, 2017.

=== Hokkaido Nippon-Ham Fighters ===
On December 8, 2017, Rodriguez signed with the Hokkaido Nippon-Ham Fighters of Nippon Professional Baseball. On March 30, 2018, he made his NPB debut as the Opening Day starting pitcher. He finished the year with a 5.26 ERA in 9 games. In 2019, Rodriguez pitched to a 6-7 record and 3.25 ERA in 91 1/3 innings of work. On October 18, 2019, Rodriguez signed a 1-year extension to remain with the Fighters. In 2020, he posted a 2.25 ERA in 7 appearances for the Fighters.

On November 1, 2022, Rodriguez re-signed a one–year deal for the 2023 season.

Rodriguez returned to the Fighters for the 2024 season as well. In 10 appearances for the team, he posted a 1–1 record and 2.08 ERA with 3 strikeouts over 8 2/3 innings pitched. On October 15, 2024, the Fighters announced they would not be offering Rodriguez a contract for the 2025 season, making him a free agent.

=== Toros de Tijuana ===
On April 16, 2025, Rodriguez signed with the Toros de Tijuana of the Mexican League. In seven appearances for Tijuana, he posted an 0-2 record and 4.76 ERA with six strikeouts across 5 2/3 innings pitched. Rodriguez was released by the Toros on May 5.

== International career ==
He was selected to the roster for the Dominican Republic national baseball team at the 2015 WBSC Premier12 and 2017 World Baseball Classic.
