= Hiroyuki Fukuyama =

Japanese baseball player

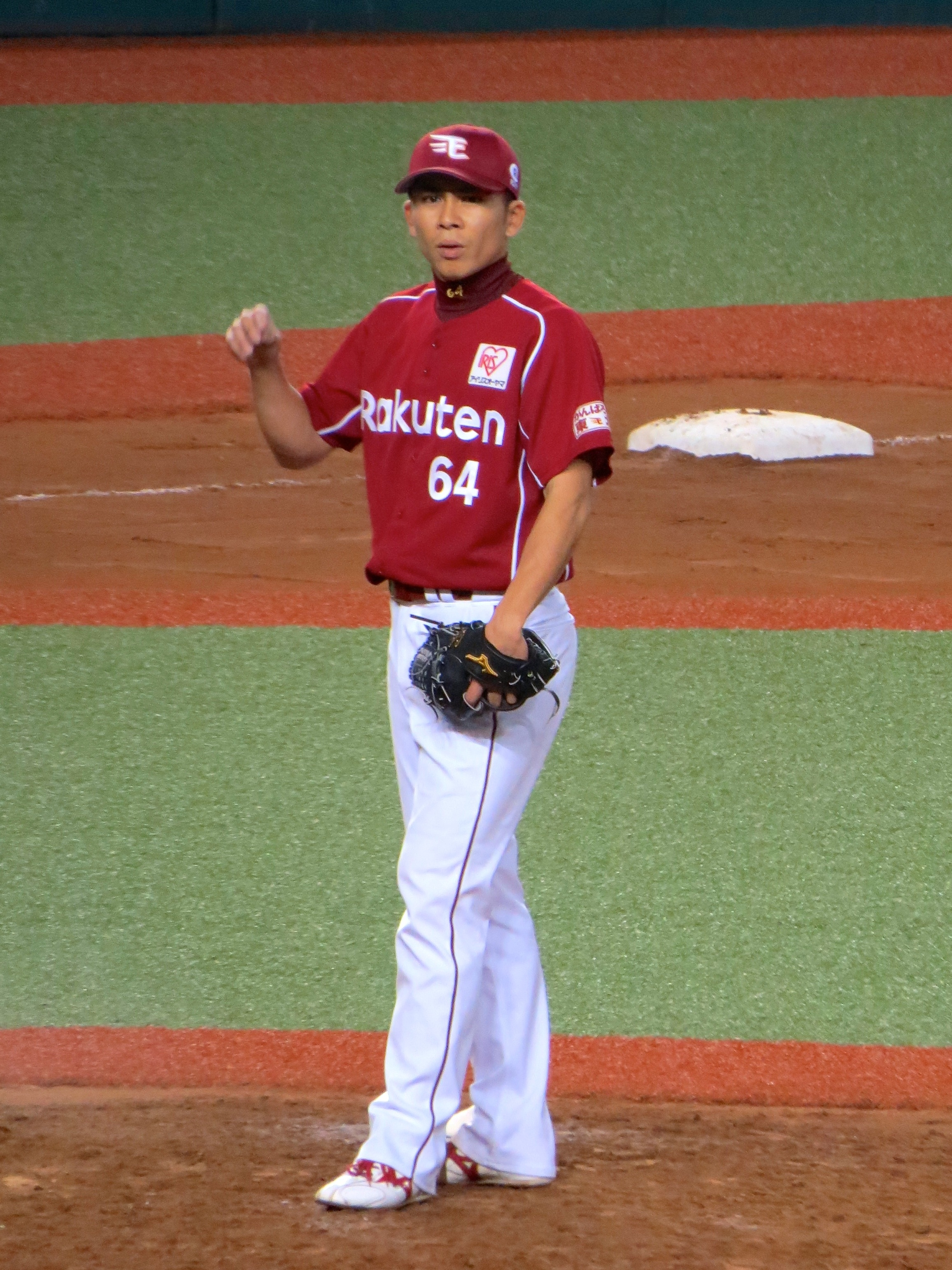
- Pitcher
- Born: March 27, 1989 (age 36)
- Batted: Right Threw: Right

NPB debut
- August 13, 2011, for the Yokohama BayStars

Last NPB appearance
- July 9, 2022, for the Tohoku Rakuten Golden Eagles

Career statistics (through 2022 season)
- Win–loss record: 17–15
- Earned run average: 2.92
- Strikeouts: 184
- Saves: 9
- Holds: 102

Teams
- Yokohama BayStars/Yokohama DeNA BayStars (2011–2012); Tohoku Rakuten Golden Eagles (2013–2022)

Career highlights and awards
- 1× Japan Series champion (2013); 1× NPB All-Star (2014)

Hiroyuki Fukuyama (福山 博之, born March 27, 1989) is a Japanese professional baseball pitcher for the Tohoku Rakuten Golden Eagles in Japan's Nippon Professional Baseball.
