= Hōsei Takata =

Japanese baseball player

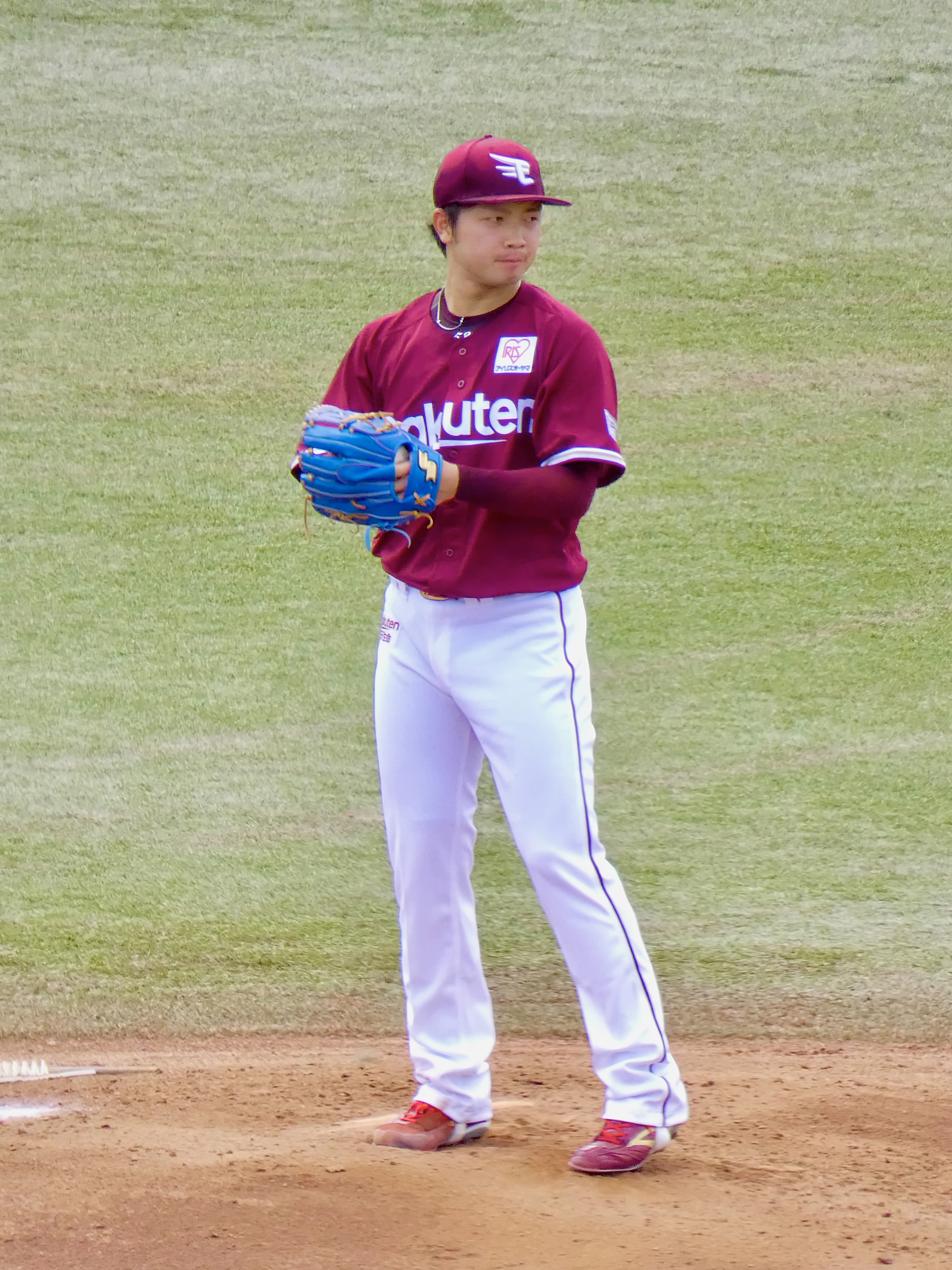
- Takata with the Tohoku Rakuten Golden Eagles
- Pitcher
- Born: July 4, 1998 (age 27)
- Bats: Right Throws: Right

NPB debut
- 2018, for the Yomiuri Giants

NPB statistics (through 2021)
- Win–loss record: 0-1
- ERA: 10.43
- Strikeouts: 15

Teams
- Yomiuri Giants (2018–2019); Tohoku Rakuten Golden Eagles (2020–2022)

Hōsei Takata (髙田 萌生, born July 4, 1998) is a Japanese professional baseball pitcher who played for the Yomiuri Giants and Tohoku Rakuten Golden Eagles in Japan's Nippon Professional Baseball from 2018 to 2022.
