= Shū Sugahara =

Japanese baseball player

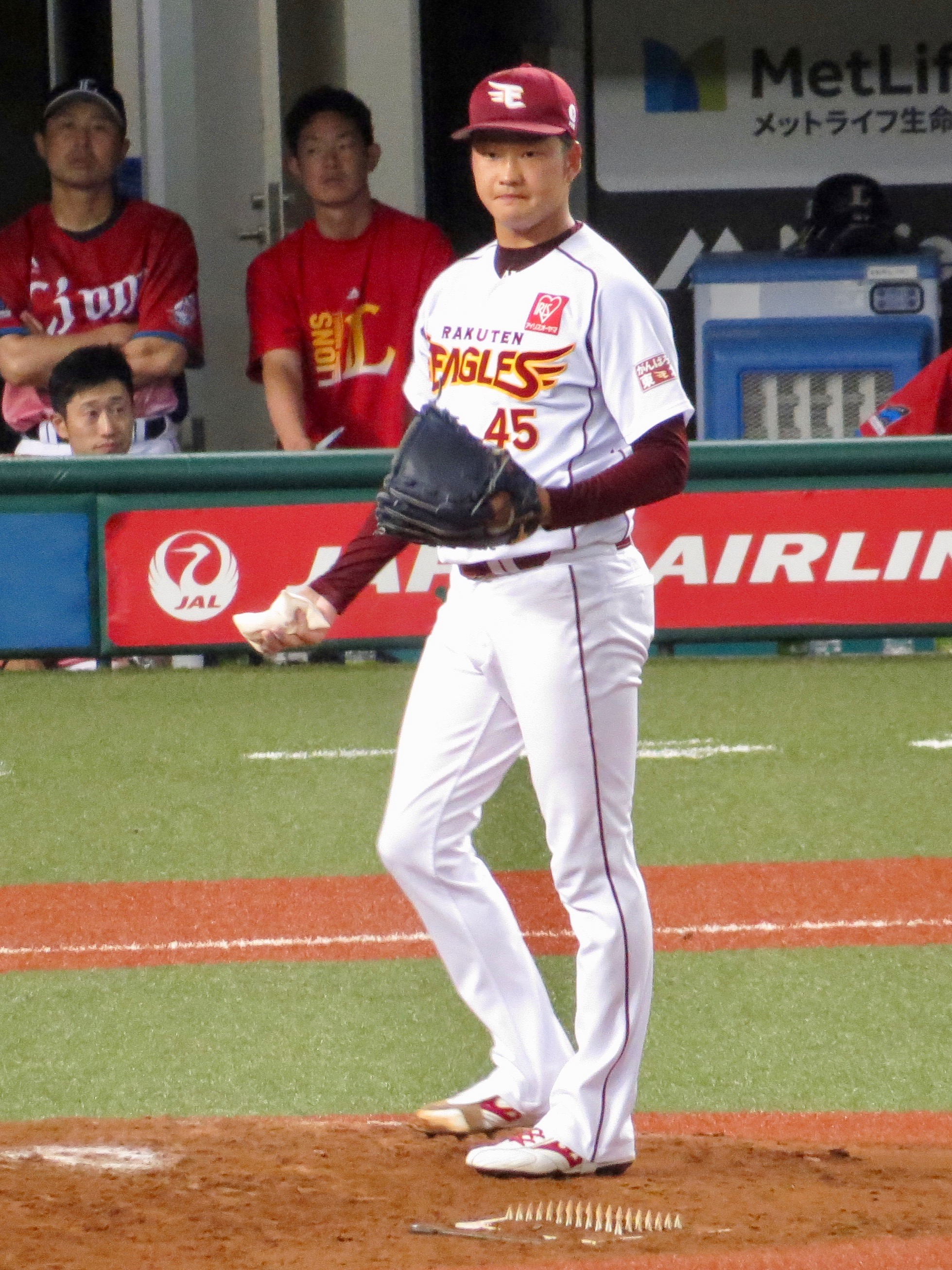

Tohoku Rakuten Golden Eagles – No. 45
- Pitcher
- Born: April 5, 1994 (age 31); Suita, Osaka, Japan
- Bats: Left Throws: Left

debut
- April 2, 2017, for the Tohoku Rakuten Golden Eagles

Career statistics (through 2020 season)
- Win–loss record: 2–3
- Earned run average: 5.26
- Strikeouts: 64
- Saves: 0
- Holds: 1

Teams
- Tohoku Rakuten Golden Eagles (2017–present)

Shū Sugahara (菅原 秀, Sugahara Shū; born April 5, 1994 in Suita, Osaka, Japan) is a professional Japanese baseball player. He plays pitcher for the Tohoku Rakuten Golden Eagles.
