= Tomohito Sakai =

Japanese baseball player (born 1993)

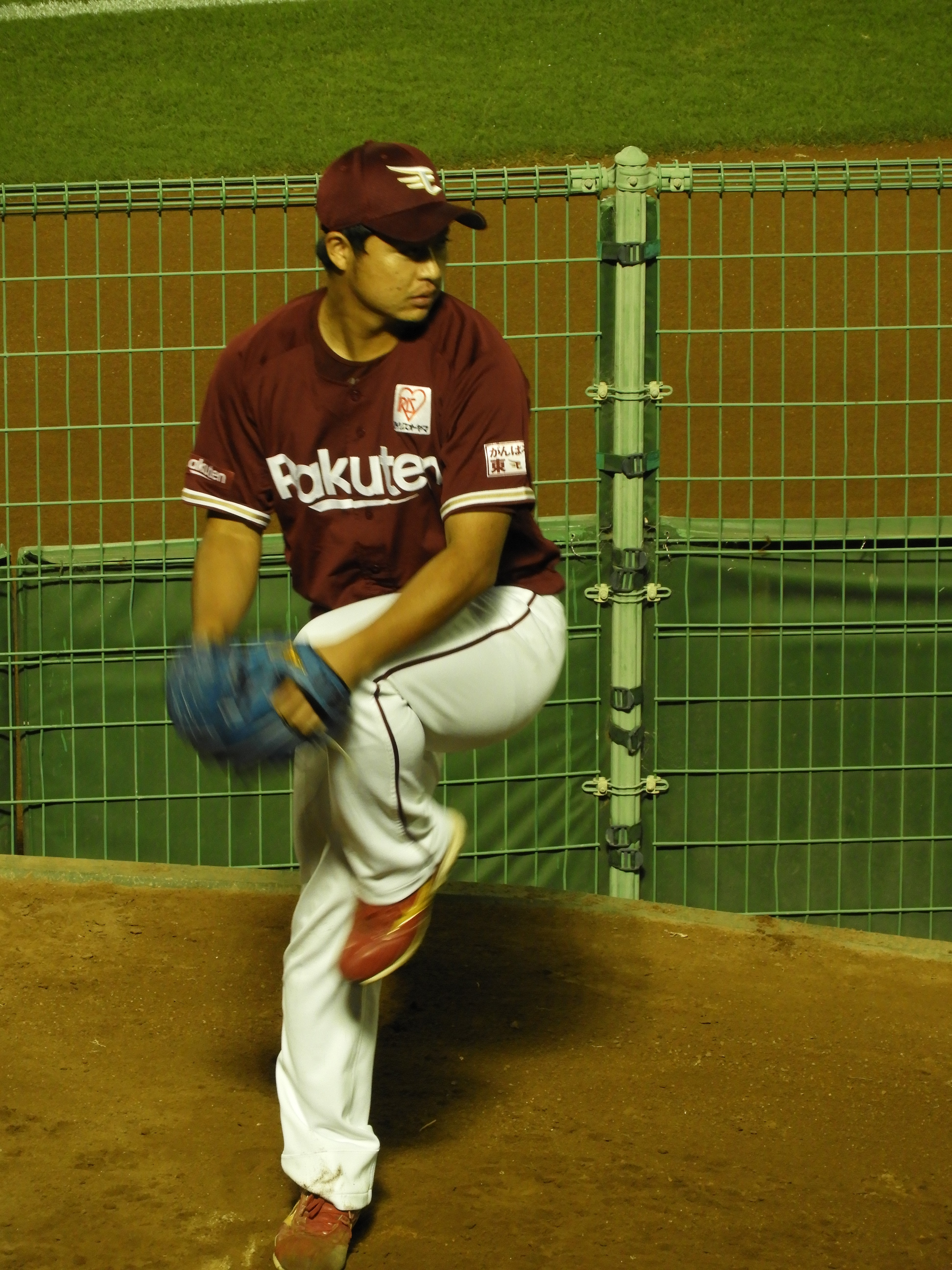

Tohoku Rakuten Golden Eagles – No. 28
- Pitcher
- Born: January 2, 1993 (age 33); Hirakata, Osaka, Japan
- Bats: Right Throws: Right

NPB debut
- April 25, 2017, for the Chiba Lotte Marines

NPB statistics (through 2024 season)
- Win–loss record: 27-22
- ERA: 3.64
- Strikeouts: 332
- Saves: 4
- Holds: 108
- Stats at Baseball Reference

Teams
- Chiba Lotte Marines (2017-2019); Tohoku Rakuten Golden Eagles (2020-present)

Tomohito Sakai (酒居 知史, Sakai Tomohito; born January 2, 1993 in Hirakata, Osaka Prefecture) is a Japanese professional baseball pitcher for the Tohoku Rakuten Golden Eagles of Nippon Professional Baseball (NPB). He previously played for the Chiba Lotte Marines.

== Career ==
On December 19, 2018, he was sent to Tohoku Rakuten Golden Eagles as compensation from the earlier transferred for Manabu Mima.
