= Naoto Nishiguchi =

Japanese baseball player (born 1996)

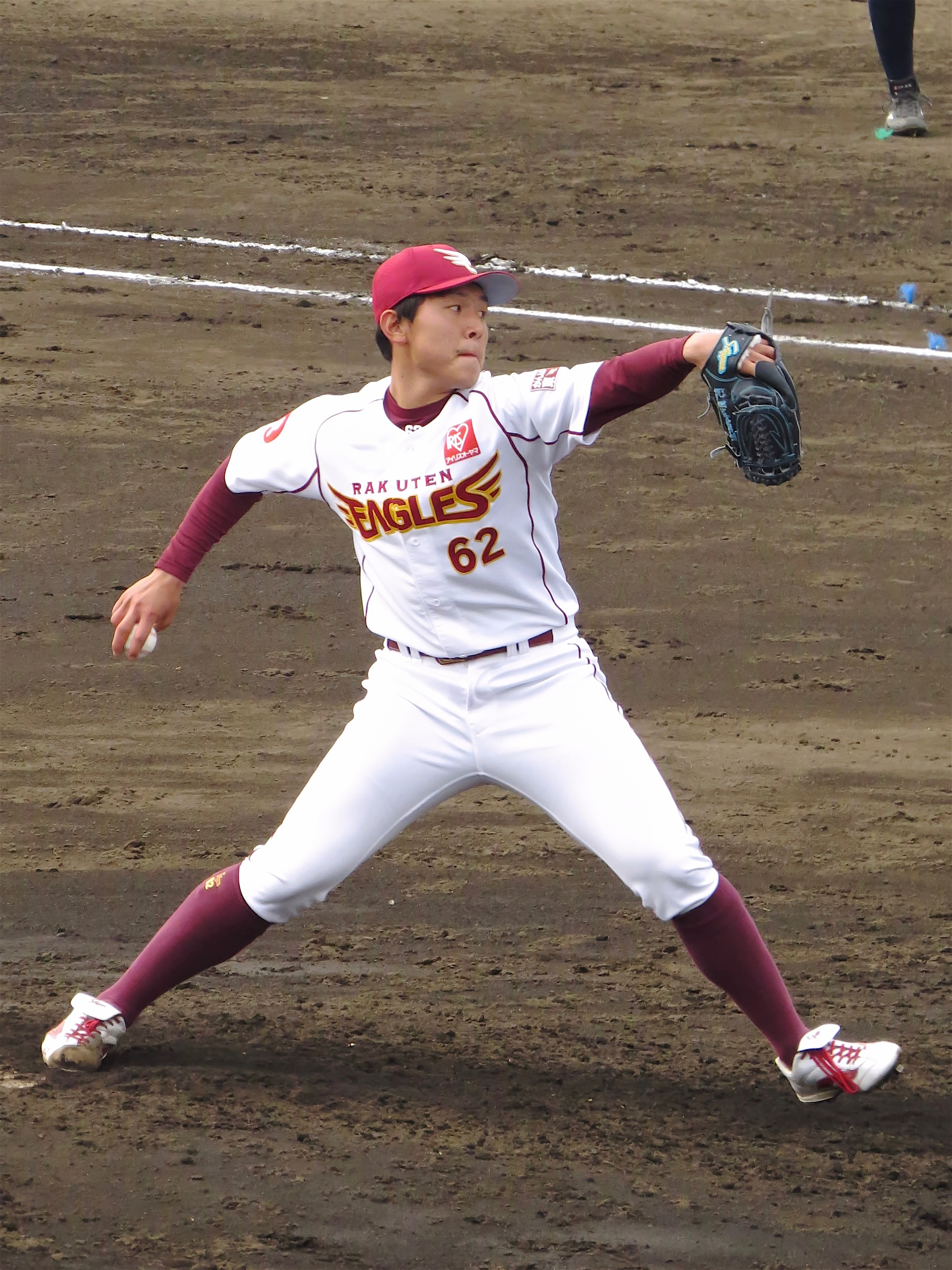
- Nishiguchi with the Tohoku Rakuten Golden Eagles

Tohoku Rakuten Golden Eagles – No. 62
- Pitcher
- Born: November 14, 1996 (age 29); Yao, Osaka, Japan
- Bats: Right Throws: Right

NPB debut
- 2018, for the Tohoku Rakuten Golden Eagles

NPB statistics (through 2025 season)
- Win–loss record: 12–7
- ERA: 2.53
- Strikeouts: 205
- Stats at Baseball Reference

Teams
- Tohoku Rakuten Golden Eagles (2018–present)

Career highlights and awards
- NPB All-Star (2025)

Naoto Nishiguchi (西口 直人, born November 14, 1996) is a Japanese professional baseball pitcher for the Tohoku Rakuten Golden Eagles of Nippon Professional Baseball (NPB). He made his NPB debut in 2018, pitching in one game that season.
