= Naoya Masuda =

Japanese baseball player (born 1989)

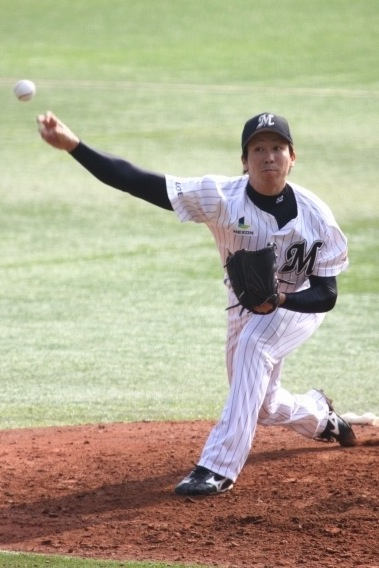
- Masuda with the Chiba Lotte Marines

Chiba Lotte Marines – No. 52
- Pitcher
- Born: October 25, 1989 (age 36); Tokyo Japan
- Bats: Right Throws: Right

NPB debut
- March 30, 2012, for the Chiba Lotte Marines

NPB statistics (through 2025 season)
- Win–loss record: 34-56
- ERA: 2.96
- Strikeouts: 678
- Saves: 250
- Holds: 174
- Stats at Baseball Reference

Teams
- Chiba Lotte Marines (2012–present)

Career highlights and awards
- Pacific League Rookie of the Year (2012); 2× Pacific League Saves leader (2013, 2021); 5× NPB All-Star (2012, 2013, 2016, 2021, 2022)

Naoya Masuda (益田 直也, born October 25, 1989, in Kinokawa, Wakayama) is a Japanese professional baseball pitcher for the Chiba Lotte Marines of Japan's Nippon Professional Baseball.

== Career ==
In the 2021 season, Masuda set a Marines club record for saves, with 38, while posting a 2.24 ERA with 68 strikeouts and earning NPB All-Star honors on the year.
