= Toshihiro Sugiura =

Japanese baseball player (born 1992)

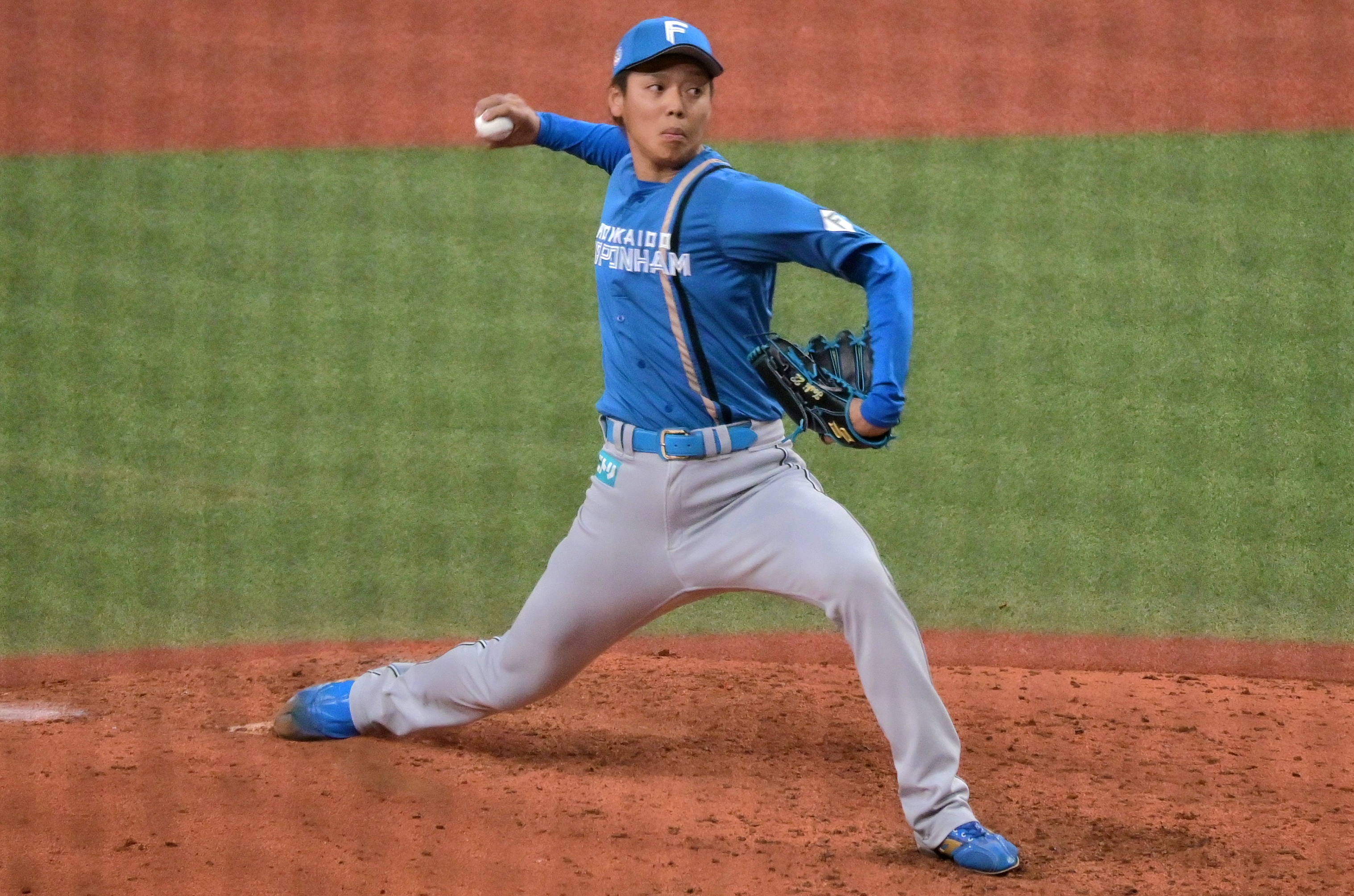
- Sugiura with the Hokkaido Nippon Ham Fighters

Chunichi Dragons – No. 33
- Pitcher
- Born: February 25, 1992 (age 34); Obihiro, Hokkaido, Japan
- Bats: Right Throws: Right

NPB debut
- September 10, 2014, for the Tokyo Yakult Swallows

NPB statistics (through 2024 season)
- Win–loss record: 27-27
- Earned run average: 3.76
- Strikeouts: 398
- Holds: 16
- Saves: 32
- Stats at Baseball Reference

Teams
- Tokyo Yakult Swallows (2014–2017); Hokkaido Nippon-Ham Fighters (2017–2026); Chunichi Dragons (2026–present)

Toshihiro Sugiura (杉浦 稔大, Sugiura Toshihiro; born February 25, 1992 in Obihiro, Hokkaido, Japan) is a professional Japanese baseball player who currently pitches for the Chunichi Dragons.

His wife is Japanese announcer Asami Konno.
