= Mizuki Hori =

Japanese baseball player (born 1998)

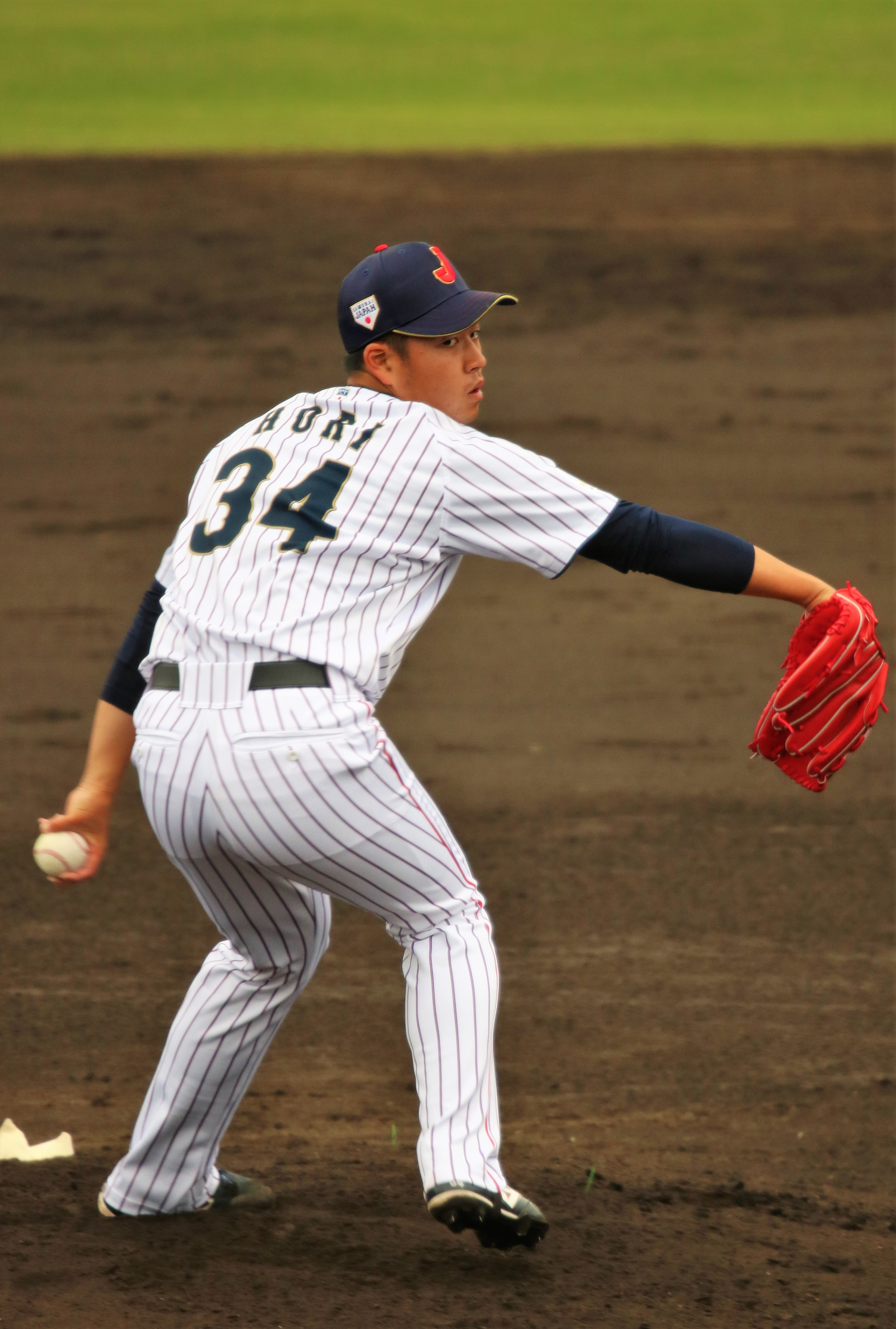

Hokkaido Nippon Ham Fighters – No. 34
- Pitcher
- Born: May 10, 1998 (age 27); Kure, Hiroshima, Japan
- Bats: Left Throws: Left

debut
- August 9, 2017, for the Hokkaido Nippon-Ham Fighters

NPB statistics (through 2024 season)
- Win–loss record: 13-16
- ERA: 4.72
- Strikeouts: 248
- Holds: 70
- Saves: 8
- Stats at Baseball Reference

Teams
- Hokkaido Nippon-Ham Fighters (2017–present)

Career highlights and awards
- 1× Pacific League Most Valuable Setup Pitcher (2021)

Mizuki Hori (堀 瑞輝, Hori Mizuki; born May 10, 1998 in Kure, Hiroshima, Japan) is a professional Japanese baseball player. He plays pitcher for the Hokkaido Nippon-Ham Fighters.
