= Hiroaki Shimauchi =

Japanese baseball player (born 1990)

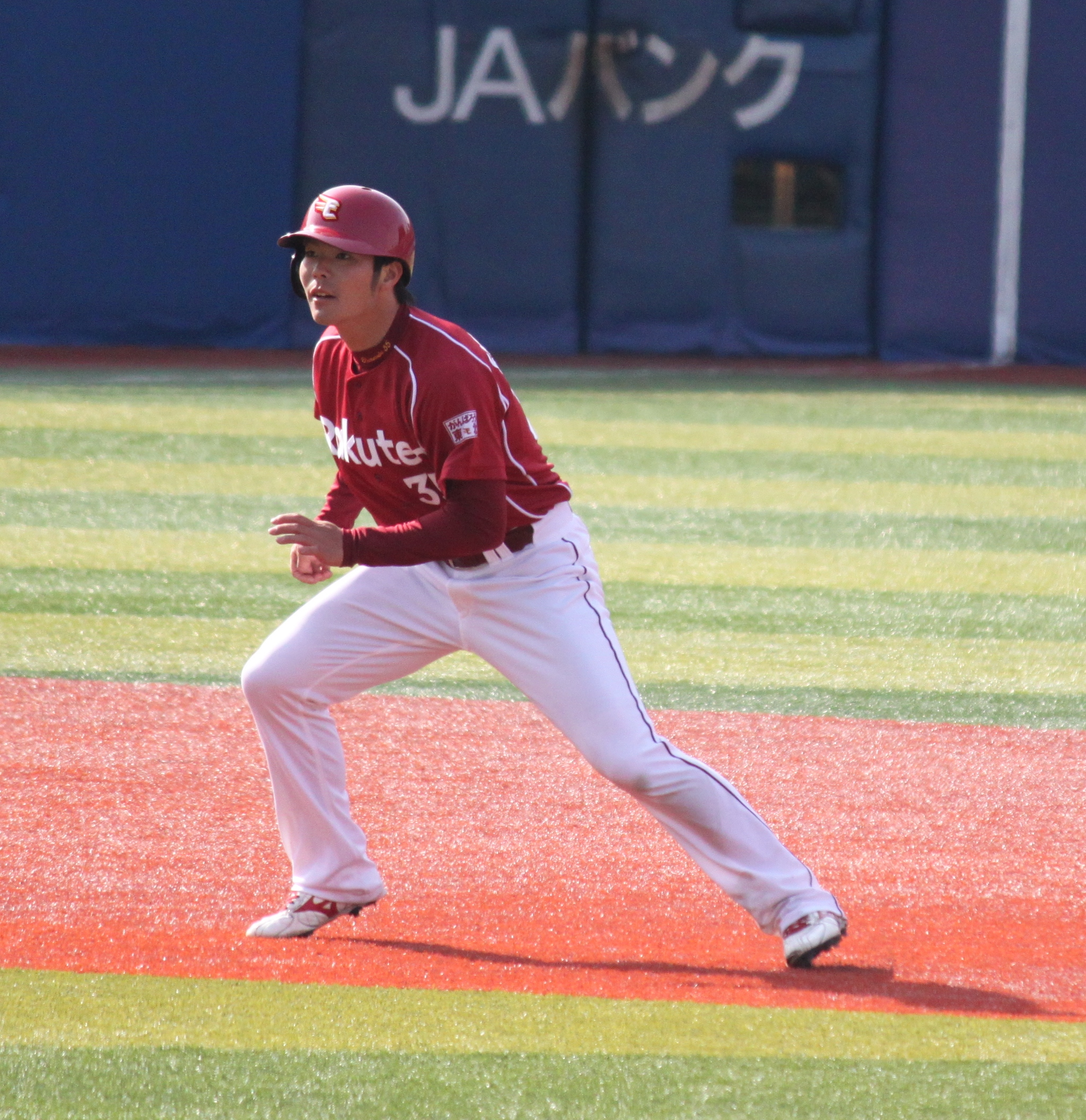
- Shimauchi with the Tohoku Rakuten Golden Eagles

Tohoku Rakuten Golden Eagles – No. 35
- Outfielder
- Born: February 2, 1990 (age 36)
- Bats: Left Throws: Left

NPB debut
- March 30, 2012, for the Tohoku Rakuten Golden Eagles

NPB statistics (through May 8, 2024)
- Batting average: .273
- Home runs: 104
- Runs batted in: 550
- Stats at Baseball Reference

Teams
- Tohoku Rakuten Golden Eagles (2012–present)

Career highlights and awards
- Japan Series champion (2013); NPB All-Star MVP (2021); Pacific League RBI Leader (2021); 2× NPB All-Star (2021, 2022)

Hiroaki Shimauchi (島内 宏明, born February 2, 1990) is a Japanese professional baseball outfielder for the Tohoku Rakuten Golden Eagles in Japan's Nippon Professional Baseball.
