= 2021 Nippon Professional Baseball season =

72nd annual season of Nippon Professional Baseball

2021 NPB season
- League: Nippon Professional Baseball
- Sport: Baseball
- Duration: March 26 – November 21
- Games: 143
- Teams: 12

Central League pennant
- League champions: Tokyo Yakult Swallows
- Runners-up: Hanshin Tigers
- Season MVP: Munetaka Murakami (Yakult)

Pacific League pennant
- League champions: Orix Buffaloes
- Runners-up: Chiba Lotte Marines
- Season MVP: Yoshinobu Yamamoto (Orix)

Climax Series
- CL champions: Tokyo Yakult Swallows
- CL runners-up: Yomiuri Giants
- PL champions: Orix Buffaloes
- PL runners-up: Chiba Lotte Marines

Japan Series
- Venue: Hotto Motto Field Kobe, Suma-ku, Kobe; Kyocera Dome Osaka, Nishi-ku, Osaka; Tokyo Dome, Bunkyō, Tokyo
- Champions: Tokyo Yakult Swallows
- Runners-up: Orix Buffaloes
- Finals MVP: Yuhei Nakamura (Yakult)

NPB seasons
- ← 2020 2022 →

The 2021 Nippon Professional Baseball season was the 72nd season of professional baseball in Japan since Nippon Professional Baseball (NPB) was reorganized in 1950. There were 12 NPB teams, split evenly between the Central League and Pacific League.

Following the All-Star Series held on 16–17 July, the regular season went on hiatus in preparation for the 2020 Summer Olympics baseball tournament. The season resumed on 13 August. In the postseason, the Tokyo Yakult Swallows defeated the Orix Buffaloes in the Japan Series.

== Regular season standings ==
Central League regular season standings
Rank	Team	G	W	L	T	Pct.	GB	Home	Road
1	Tokyo Yakult Swallows	143	73	52	18	.584	—	36–29–7	37–23–11
2	Hanshin Tigers	143	77	56	10	.579	0	36–31–4	41–25–6
3	Yomiuri Giants	143	61	62	20	.496	11	32–30–10	29–32–10
4	Hiroshima Toyo Carp	143	63	68	12	.481	13	30–34–8	33–34–4
5	Chunichi Dragons	143	55	71	17	.437	18½	33–27–11	22–44–6
6	Yokohama DeNA BayStars	143	54	73	16	.425	20	27–37–7	27–36–9

Pacific League regular season standings
Rank	Team	G	W	L	T	Pct.	GB	Home	Road
1	Orix Buffaloes	143	70	55	18	.560	—	38–22–12	32–33–6
2	Chiba Lotte Marines	143	67	57	19	.540	2½	33–32–7	34–25–12
3	Tohoku Rakuten Golden Eagles	143	66	62	15	.514	5½	31–33–8	35–29–7
4	Fukuoka SoftBank Hawks	143	60	62	21	.492	8½	31–29–11	29–33–10
5	Hokkaido Nippon-Ham Fighters	143	55	68	20	.447	14	25–36–10	30–32–10
6	Saitama Seibu Lions	143	55	70	18	.440	15	30–34–7	25–36–11

=== Interleague ===
Regular season interleague standings
Team	G	W	L	T	Win%	GB	Home	Away
Orix Buffaloes	18	12	5	1	.706	—	7–1–1	5–4
Hanshin Tigers	18	11	7	0	.611	1½	3–6	8–1
Yokohama DeNA BayStars	18	9	6	3	.600	2	6–2–1	3–4–2
Chunichi Dragons	18	9	7	2	.563	2½	5–2–2	4–5
Tokyo Yakult Swallows	18	10	8	0	.556	2½	5–4	5–4
Tohoku Rakuten Golden Eagles	18	9	8	1	.529	3	3–5–1	6–3
Saitama Seibu Lions	18	7	7	4	.500	3½	5–3–1	2–4–3
Chiba Lotte Marines	18	8	9	1	.471	4	5–4	3–5–1
Yomiuri Giants	18	7	8	3	.467	4	4–3–2	3–5–1
Hokkaido Nippon-Ham Fighters	18	7	11	0	.389	5½	2–7	5–4
Fukuoka SoftBank Hawks	18	5	9	4	.357	5½	3–4–2	2–5–2
Hiroshima Toyo Carp	18	3	12	3	.200	8	2–6–1	1–6–2

== Climax Series ==
First stage
Central League
2	Hanshin Tigers	0
3	Yomiuri Giants	2
Pacific League
2	Chiba Lotte Marines	1
3	Tohoku Rakuten Golden Eagles	0

Final stage
1	Tokyo Yakult Swallows	3
3	Yomiuri Giants	0
1	Orix Buffaloes	3
2	Chiba Lotte Marines	0

Japan Series
CL1	Tokyo Yakult Swallows	4
PL1	Orix Buffaloes	2

=== First stage ===
==== Central League ====
Yomiuri Giants won the series, 2–0.

Game	Date	Score	Location	Time	Attendance
1	November 6	Yomiuri Giants − 4, Hanshin Tigers − 0	Koshien Stadium	3:11	21,478
2	November 7	Yomiuri Giants − 4, Hanshin Tigers − 2	Koshien Stadium	3:33	21,492

==== Pacific League ====
Chiba Lotte Marines won the series, 1−0−1 as a higher seed.

Game	Date	Score	Location	Time	Attendance
1	November 6	Tohoku Rakuten Golden Eagles − 4, Chiba Lotte Marines − 5	Zozo Marine Stadium	3:10	14,904
2	November 7	Tohoku Rakuten Golden Eagles − 4, Chiba Lotte Marines − 4	Zozo Marine Stadium	3:07	14,891

=== Final stage ===
The series started with a 1–0 advantage for the first-placed team.

==== Central League ====
Tokyo Yakult Swallows won the series, 3−0−1 as a higher seed.

Game	Date	Score	Location	Time	Attendance
1	November 10	Tokyo Yakult Swallows − 4, Yomiuri Giants − 0	Meiji Jingu Stadium	2:38	17,792
2	November 11	Tokyo Yakult Swallows − 5, Yomiuri Giants − 0	Meiji Jingu Stadium	3:19	17,230
3	November 12	Tokyo Yakult Swallows − 2, Yomiuri Giants − 2	Meiji Jingu Stadium	3:08	19,022

==== Pacific League ====
Orix Buffaloes won the series, 3−0−1 as a higher seed.

Game	Date	Score	Location	Time	Attendance
1	November 10	Orix Buffaloes − 1, Chiba Lotte Marines − 0	Kyocera Dome Osaka	2:23	17,915
2	November 11	Orix Buffaloes − 2, Chiba Lotte Marines − 0	Kyocera Dome Osaka	2:42	17,913
3	November 12	Orix Buffaloes − 3, Chiba Lotte Marines − 3	Kyocera Dome Osaka	3:33	18,006

== Japan Series ==
Tokyo Yakult Swallows won the series, 4–2.

Game	Date	Score	Location	Time	Attendance
1	November 20	Orix Buffaloes – 4, Tokyo Yakult Swallows – 3	Kyocera Dome Osaka	3:46	19,297
2	November 21	Orix Buffaloes – 0, Tokyo Yakult Swallows – 2	Kyocera Dome Osaka	2:56	17,075
3	November 23	Tokyo Yakult Swallows − 5, Orix Buffaloes − 4	Tokyo Dome	3:45	24,565
4	November 24	Tokyo Yakult Swallows – 2, Orix Buffaloes – 1	Tokyo Dome	2:50	20,617
5	November 25	Tokyo Yakult Swallows – 5, Orix Buffaloes – 6	Tokyo Dome	3:16	20,580
6	November 27	Orix Buffaloes – 1, Tokyo Yakult Swallows – 2 (12)	Hotto Motto Field	5:00	15,239

== League leaders ==
=== Central League ===
Batting leaders
Stat	Player	Team	Total
Batting average	Seiya Suzuki	Hiroshima Toyo Carp	.317
Home runs	Munetaka Murakami; Kazuma Okamoto	Tokyo Yakult Swallows; Yomiuri Giants	39
Runs batted in	Kazuma Okamoto	Yomiuri Giants	113
Hits	Kōji Chikamoto	Hanshin Tigers	178
Stolen bases	Takumu Nakano	Hanshin Tigers	30
On-base percentage	Seiya Suzuki	Hiroshima Toyo Carp	.433

Pitching leaders
Stat	Player	Team	Total
Wins	Kōyō Aoyagi; Aren Kuri	Hanshin Tigers; Hiroshima Toyo Carp	13
Earned run average	Yūya Yanagi	Chunichi Dragons	2.20
Strikeouts	Yūya Yanagi	Chunichi Dragons	168
Saves	Robert Suárez	Hanshin Tigers	42
Holds	Noboru Shimizu	Tokyo Yakult Swallows	53
Winning percentage	Kōyō Aoyagi	Hanshin Tigers	.684

=== Pacific League ===
Batting leaders
Stat	Player	Team	Total
Batting average	Masataka Yoshida	Orix Buffaloes	.339
Home runs	Yutaro Sugimoto	Orix Buffaloes	32
Runs batted in	Hiroaki Shimauchi	Tohoku Rakuten Golden Eagles	96
Hits	Takashi Ogino	Chiba Lotte Marines	169
Stolen bases	Sōsuke Genda; Takashi Ogino; Koshiro Wada; Haruki Nishikawa	Saitama Seibu Lions; Chiba Lotte Marines; Chiba Lotte Marines; Hokkaido Nippon-Ham Fighters	24
On-base percentage	Masataka Yoshida	Orix Buffaloes	.429

Pitching leaders
Stat	Player	Team	Total
Wins	Yoshinobu Yamamoto	Orix Buffaloes	18
Earned run average	Yoshinobu Yamamoto	Orix Buffaloes	1.39
Strikeouts	Yoshinobu Yamamoto	Orix Buffaloes	206
Saves	Naoya Masuda	Chiba Lotte Marines	38
Holds	Mizuki Hori	Hokkaido Nippon-Ham Fighters	42
Winning percentage	Yoshinobu Yamamoto	Orix Buffaloes	.783

== See also ==
- 2021 in baseball
- 2021 Major League Baseball season
- 2021 KBO League season
- 2021 Chinese Professional Baseball League season
- Impact of the COVID-19 pandemic on sports
