= 2020 Tohoku Rakuten Golden Eagles season =

Professional sports season in Nippon Professional Baseball

2020 Tohoku Rakuten Golden Eagles
- 2020 Tohoku Blue logo
- League: Pacific League
- Ballpark: Rakuten Seimei Park Miyagi
- Record: 55–57–8 (.491)
- League place: 4th
- Parent company: Rakuten
- President: Yozo Tachibana
- General manager: Kazuhisa Ishii
- Manager: Hajime Miki
- Captain: Eigoro Mogi
- Average attendance: 3,935

The 2020 Tohoku Rakuten Golden Eagles season was the sixteenth season of the Tohoku Rakuten Golden Eagles franchise. The Eagles played their home games at Rakuten Seimei Park Miyagi in the city of Sendai as members of Nippon Professional Baseball's Pacific League. The team was led by Hajime Miki on his first and only season as team manager.

Rakuten did not qualify for the Climax Series, finishing the COVID-shortened season in fourth place with a record of 55–57–8.

== Regular season ==
=== Standings ===
2020 Pacific League regular season standings
Pos	Team	G	W	L	T	Pct.	GB	Home	Road
1	Fukuoka SoftBank Hawks^{†}	120	73	42	5	.635	—	40–19–1	33–23–4
2	Chiba Lotte Marines*	120	60	57	3	.513	14	35–23–2	25–34–1
3	Saitama Seibu Lions	120	58	58	4	.500	15½	35–22–3	23–36–1
**4**	**Tohoku Rakuten Golden Eagles**	**120**	**55**	**57**	**8**	**.491**	**16½**	**31–25–4**	**24–32–4**
5	Hokkaido Nippon-Ham Fighters	120	53	62	5	.461	20	31–26–3	22–36–2
6	Orix Buffaloes	120	45	68	7	.398	27	26–31–3	19–37–4

^{†} League champion and advanced to the Climax Series
* Advanced to the Climax Series

=== Record vs. opponents ===
2020 record vs. opponents
Team	Buffaloes	Eagles	Fighters	Hawks	Lions	Marines
Buffaloes	—	12–10–2	11–12–1	5–17–2	12–11–1	5–18–1
**Eagles**	**10–12–2**	—	**11–10–3**	**9–15**	**10–12–2**	**15–8–1**
Fighters	12–11–1	10–11–3	—	6–17–1	14–10	11–13
Hawks	17–5–2	15–9	17–6–1	—	13–10–1	11–12–1
Lions	11–12–1	12–10–2	10–14	10–13–1	—	15–9
Marines	18–5–1	8–15–1	13–11	12–11–1	9–15	—

=== Chihō ballparks ===
The Eagles had planned to host two home games outside of Rakuten Seimei Park Miyagi in 2020. Both were to be played at chihō, or "countryside", ballparks in Aomori and Akita Prefectures in Japan's Tōhoku region. Due to the COVID-19 pandemic, however, both of games were cancelled.

2020 Rakuten Eagles chihō ballparks
Ballpark	City	Prefecture
Haruka Yume Stadium^{†}	Hirosaki	Aomori Prefecture
Komachi Stadium^{†}	Akita	Akita Prefecture

^{†} Game was cancelled due to the COVID-19 pandemic.

=== Opening Day starting roster ===
Friday, June 19, 2020 at Orix Buffaloes

2020 Rakuten Eagles Opening Day starting roster
Order	Player	Position
1	Eigoro Mogi	Shortstop
2	Daichi Suzuki	Third baseman
3	Jabari Blash	Designated hitter
4	Hideto Asamura	Second baseman
5	Hiroaki Shimauchi	Left fielder
6	Stefen Romero	Right fielder
7	Ginji Akaminai	First baseman
8	Hikaru Ohta	Catcher
9	Ryosuke Tatsumi	Center fielder
—	Takahiro Norimoto	Starting pitcher

=== Game log ===
2020 game log: 55–57–8 (Home: 31–25–4; Away: 24–32–4)
June: 7–3 (Home: 5–2; Away: 2–1)

#	Date	Opponent	Score	Win	Loss	Save	Stadium	Attendance	Record	Streak
1	June 19	@ Buffaloes	9–1	**T. Norimoto** (1–0)	Kambe (0–1)	—	Kyocera Dome	—	1–0–0	W1
2	June 20	@ Buffaloes	2–1 (10)	**Morihara** (1–0)	Sawada (0–1)	**Karashima** (1)	Kyocera Dome	—	2–0–0	W2
3	June 21	@ Buffaloes	0–4	Yamamoto (1–0)	**Ishibashi** (0–1)	—	Kyocera Dome	—	2–1–0	L1
4	June 23	Fighters	4–0	**Yuge** (1–0)	Martinez (0–1)	—	Rakuten Seimei Park	—	3–1–0	W1
5	June 24	Fighters	5–2	**Wakui** (1–0)	Kawano (0–1)	**Morihara** (1)	Rakuten Seimei Park	—	4–1–0	W2
6	June 25	Fighters	5–8	VerHagen (1–0)	**Shiomi** (0–1)	—	Rakuten Seimei Park	—	4–2–0	L1
7	June 26	Fighters	7–1	**T. Norimoto** (2–0)	Arihara (0–2)	—	Rakuten Seimei Park	—	5–2–0	W1
8	June 27	Fighters	18–4	**Sakai** (1–0)	Tamai (1–1)	—	Rakuten Seimei Park	—	6–2–0	W2
9	June 28	Fighters	4–6	Sugiura (1–0)	**Ishibashi** (0–2)	Akiyoshi (2)	Rakuten Seimei Park	—	6–3–0	L1
10	June 30	Marines	15–4	**Yuge** (2–0)	Futaki (0–1)	—	Rakuten Seimei Park	—	7–3–0	W1

July: 12–13–1 (Home: 8–7–1; Away: 4–6)

#	Date	Opponent	Score	Win	Loss	Save	Stadium	Attendance	Record	Streak
11	July 1	Marines	5–3	**Wakui** (2–0)	Ojima (1–1)	**Morihara** (2)	Rakuten Seimei Park	—	8–3–0	W2
12	July 2	Marines	5–8	Iwashita (2–0)	**Shiomi** (0–2)	—	Rakuten Seimei Park	—	8–4–0	L1
13	July 3	Marines	3–1	**T. Norimoto** (3–0)	Ishikawa (0–1)	**Morihara** (3)	Rakuten Seimei Park	—	9–4–0	W1
14	July 4	Marines	3–1 (7)	**Kishi** (1–0)	Taneichi (0–1)	**Chargois** (1)	Rakuten Seimei Park	—	10–4–0	W2
15	July 5	Marines	8–1	**Ishibashi** (1–2)	Mima (1–1)	—	Rakuten Seimei Park	—	11–4–0	W3
16	July 7	@ Hawks	3–4	Senga (1–0)	**Yuge** (2–1)	Mori (3)	PayPay Dome	—	11–5–0	L1
17	July 8	@ Hawks	12–8	**Wakui** (3–0)	Kasaya (0–1)	—	PayPay Dome	—	12–5–0	W1
18	July 9	@ Hawks	9–1	**Shiomi** (1–2)	van den Hurk (1–1)	—	PayPay Dome	—	13–5–0	W2
19	July 10	@ Hawks	1–2 (10)	R. Takahashi (2–0)	**Chargois** (0–1)	—	PayPay Dome	1,839	13–6–0	L1
20	July 11	@ Hawks	4–8	Niho (1–2)	**Karashima** (0–1)	—	PayPay Dome	3,419	13–7–0	L2
21	July 12	@ Hawks	1–6	Ishikawa (2–0)	**Ishibashi** (1–3)	—	PayPay Dome	4,873	13–8–0	L3
—	July 14	Lions	Postponed (rain) – Makeup date: November 7				Rakuten Seimei Park	—	—	—
22	July 15	Lions	11–0	**Wakui** (4–0)	Imai (1–3)	—	Rakuten Seimei Park	2,320	14–8–0	W1
23	July 16	Lions	7–4	**Anraku** (1–0)	K. Takahashi (1–3)	**Morihara** (4)	Rakuten Seimei Park	2,381	15–8–0	W2
24	July 17	Lions	2–10	Neal (1–0)	**T. Norimoto** (3–1)	—	Rakuten Seimei Park	3,111	15–9–0	L1
25	July 18	Lions	3–4	Matsumoto (1–2)	**Shiomi** (1–3)	Masuda (7)	Rakuten Seimei Park	3,355	15–10–0	L2
26	July 19	Lions	9–5	**Busenitz** (1–0)	Hirai (2–1)	—	Rakuten Seimei Park	3,559	16–10–0	W1
27	July 21	Buffaloes	3–10 (8)	Albers (2–2)	**Sung** (0–1)	—	Rakuten Seimei Park	2,435	16–11–0	L1
28	July 22	Buffaloes	7–11	K. Yoshida (1–0)	**Morihara** (1–1)	—	Rakuten Seimei Park	3,668	16–12–0	L2
29	July 23	Buffaloes	2−2	Game tied after 10 innings			Rakuten Seimei Park	3,414	16–12–1	T1
30	July 24	Buffaloes	2–6	Sakakibara (1–1)	**T. Norimoto** (3–2)	—	Rakuten Seimei Park	3,898	16–13–1	L1
31	July 25	Buffaloes	3–6	Yamada (2–1)	**Morihara** (1–2)	Dickson (5)	Rakuten Seimei Park	3,140	16–14–1	L2
32	July 26	Buffaloes	5–4	**Makita** (1–0)	Higgins (1–1)	**Busenitz** (1)	Rakuten Seimei Park	2,491	17–14–1	W1
33	July 28	@ Marines	12–13	Masuda (1–2)	**Chargois** (0–2)	—	Zozo Marine Stadium	3,986	17–15–1	L1
34	July 29	@ Marines	5–1	**Wakui** (5–0)	Ojima (2–3)	—	Zozo Marine Stadium	4,098	18–15–1	W1
35	July 30	@ Marines	4–3	**Kubo** (1–0)	Iwashita (3–2)	**Busenitz** (2)	Zozo Marine Stadium	4,236	19–15–1	W2
36	July 31	@ Marines	4–5	Ishikawa (1–2)	**T. Norimoto** (3–3)	Masuda (10)	Zozo Marine Stadium	4,990	19–16–1	L1

August: 12–12–2 (Home: 6–6; Away: 6–6–2)

#	Date	Opponent	Score	Win	Loss	Save	Stadium	Attendance	Record	Streak
37	August 1	@ Marines	8–0	**Shiomi** (2–3)	Taneichi (3–2)	—	Zozo Marine Stadium	4,967	20–16–1	W1
38	August 2	@ Marines	6–7	K.Y. Chen (1–0)	**Sakai** (1–1)	Masuda (11)	Zozo Marine Stadium	4,996	20–17–1	L1
39	August 4	Hawks	7–6	**Tsurusaki** (1–0)	Moinelo (0–1)	**Busenitz** (3)	Rakuten Seimei Park	3,442	21–17–1	W1
40	August 5	Hawks	6–0	**Wakui** (6–0)	Wada (3–1)	—	Rakuten Seimei Park	4,037	22–17–1	W2
41	August 6	Hawks	1–3	Bandoh (1–1)	**Matsui** (0–1)	Mori (10)	Rakuten Seimei Park	3,757	22–18–1	L1
42	August 7	Hawks	7–4	**Sung** (1–1)	Higashihama (2–1)	—	Rakuten Seimei Park	4,336	23–18–1	W1
43	August 8	Hawks	4–2	**Shiomi** (3–3)	Niho (3–3)	**Busenitz** (4)	Rakuten Seimei Park	4,277	24–18–1	W2
44	August 9	Hawks	0–5	Bandoh (2–1)	**Fukui** (0–1)	—	Rakuten Seimei Park	4,562	24–19–1	L1
45	August 11	@ Lions	7–5	**Yuge** (3–1)	K. Takahashi (2–5)	**Busenitz** (5)	MetLife Dome	4,715	25–19–1	W1
46	August 12	@ Lions	6–2	**Wakui** (7–0)	Itoh (0–1)	—	MetLife Dome	4,670	26–19–1	W2
47	August 13	@ Lions	7–4	**Sakai** (2–1)	Yoza (2–4)	**Makita** (1)	MetLife Dome	4,718	27–19–1	W3
48	August 14	@ Lions	8–13	Imai (3–3)	**Tsurusaki** (1–1)	—	MetLife Dome	4,681	27–20–1	L1
49	August 15	@ Lions	3−3	Game tied after 10 innings			MetLife Dome	4,677	27–20–2	T1
50	August 16	@ Lions	1–11	Honda (1–4)	**Fukui** (0–2)	—	MetLife Dome	4,659	27–21–2	L1
51	August 18	@ Fighters	4–9	Uwasawa (3–2)	**Yuge** (3–2)	—	Sapporo Dome	3,380	27–22–2	L2
52	August 19	@ Fighters	12–2	**Wakui** (8–0)	Sugiura (4–2)	—	Sapporo Dome	3,048	28–22–2	W1
53	August 20	@ Fighters	3−3	Game tied after 10 innings			Sapporo Dome	2,919	28–22–3	T1
54	August 21	@ Fighters	4–1	**T. Norimoto** (4–3)	Tamai (4–2)	**Busenitz** (6)	Sapporo Dome	4,927	29–22–2	W1
55	August 22	@ Fighters	1–5	Arihara (3–5)	**Shiomi** (3–4)	—	Sapporo Dome	4,947	29–23–2	L1
56	August 23	@ Fighters	0–11	VerHagen (5–1)	**Fukui** (0–3)	—	Sapporo Dome	4,936	29–24–2	L2
57	August 25	Marines	4–8	Mima (5–2)	**Chargois** (0–2)	—	Rakuten Seimei Park	3,424	29–25–2	L3
58	August 26	Marines	0–2	Ojima (4–4)	**Wakui** (8–1)	Masuda (17)	Rakuten Seimei Park	4,130	29–26–2	L4
59	August 27	Marines	15–0	**Matsui** (1–1)	Iwashita (3–4)	—	Rakuten Seimei Park	3,503	30–26–2	W1
60	August 28	Lions	2–1	**T. Norimoto** (5–3)	Neal (2–4)	**Busenitz** (7)	Rakuten Seimei Park	4,208	31–26–2	W2
61	August 29	Lions	3–6	Nolin (1–0)	**Shiomi** (3–5)	Masuda (13)	Rakuten Seimei Park	4,446	31–27–2	L1
62	August 30	Lions	2–3	Moriwaki (2–0)	**Busenitz** (1–1)	Masuda (14)	Rakuten Seimei Park	4,008	31–28–2	L2

September: 12–14 (Home: 8–6; Away: 4–8)

#	Date	Opponent	Score	Win	Loss	Save	Stadium	Attendance	Record	Streak
63	September 1	@ Fighters	1–8	Uwasawa (5–2)	**Sung** (1–2)	—	Sapporo Dome	4,041	31–29–2	L3
64	September 2	@ Fighters	5–3	**S. Ikeda** (1–0)	Akiyoshi (1–2)	**Busenitz** (8)	Sapporo Dome	3,552	32–29–2	W1
65	September 3	@ Fighters	0–4	Katoh (1–1)	**Matsui** (1–2)	—	Sapporo Dome	3,917	32–30–2	L1
66	September 4	Buffaloes	4–3	**Aoyama** (1–0)	Yamaoka (0–2)	**Busenitz** (9)	Rakuten Seimei Park	3,661	33–30–2	W1
67	September 5	Buffaloes	6–5	**Shiomi** (4–5)	Yamasaki (2–4)	**Busenitz** (10)	Rakuten Seimei Park	3,458	34–30–2	W2
68	September 6	Buffaloes	6–9	Y. Iida (1–0)	**Fukui** (0–4)	Dickson (9)	Rakuten Seimei Park	4,287	34–31–2	L1
69	September 8	Hawks	0–2	Senga (6–3)	**Karashima** (0–2)	Mori (19)	Rakuten Seimei Park	3,628	34–32–2	L2
70	September 9	Hawks	1–8	Wada (5–1)	**Wakui** (8–2)	—	Rakuten Seimei Park	4,033	34–33–2	L3
71	September 10	Hawks	2–9	Higashihama (3–1)	**Matsui** (1–3)	—	Rakuten Seimei Park	3,362	34–34–2	L4
72	September 11	Fighters	5–4 (10)	**Aoyama** (2–0)	Tamai (4–2)	—	Rakuten Seimei Park	4,178	35–34–2	W1
—	September 12	Fighters	Postponed (rain) – Makeup date: September 14				Rakuten Seimei Park	—	—	—
73	September 13	Fighters	14–6	**Teraoka** (1–0)	Arihara (4–7)	—	Rakuten Seimei Park	4,376	36–34–2	W2
74	September 14	Fighters	1–2	VerHagen (6–3)	**Shiomi** (4–6)	Miyanishi (1)	Rakuten Seimei Park	3,143	36–35–2	L1
75	September 15	@ Buffaloes	1–5	Yamamoto (5–3)	**Karashima** (0–3)	—	Hotto Motto Field	4,933	36–36–2	L2
76	September 16	@ Buffaloes	0–2	Tajima (2–4)	**Wakui** (8–3)	—	Hotto Motto Field	4,939	36–37–2	L3
77	September 17	@ Buffaloes	5–4	**Matsui** (2–3)	Masui (0–2)	**Busenitz** (11)	Hotto Motto Field	4,455	37–37–2	W1
78	September 18	@ Hawks	3–9	Moore (2–3)	**Ishibashi** (1–4)	—	PayPay Dome	4,988	37–38–2	L1
79	September 19	@ Hawks	3–1	**Sakai** (3–1)	R. Takahashi (4–2)	**Busenitz** (12)	PayPay Dome	11,937	38–38–2	W1
80	September 20	@ Hawks	3–2	**Kishi** (2–0)	Ishikawa (6–3)	**Busenitz** (13)	PayPay Dome	11,972	39–38–2	W2
81	September 22	Marines	12–4	**Johnson** (1–0)	Ishikawa (6–3)	—	Rakuten Seimei Park	6,421	40–38–2	W3
82	September 23	Marines	5–3	**Wakui** (9–3)	Karakawa (0–1)	**Busenitz** (14)	Rakuten Seimei Park	4,565	41–38–2	W4
83	September 24	Marines	3–0	**Matsui** (3–3)	Iwashita (5–6)	**Busenitz** (15)	Rakuten Seimei Park	3,421	42–38–2	W5
84	September 25	@ Lions	4–5	Moriwaki (4–0)	**Makita** (1–1)	Masuda (22)	MetLife Dome	7,691	42–39–2	L1
85	September 26	@ Lions	1–5	Moriwaki (5–0)	**Sakai** (3–2)	—	MetLife Dome	9,401	42–40–2	L2
86	September 27	@ Lions	2–6	Matsumoto (4–3)	**Takinaka** (0–1)	—	MetLife Dome	9,412	42–41–2	L3
87	September 29	Hawks	2–6	Senga (7–5)	**T. Norimoto** (5–4)	—	Rakuten Seimei Park	5,603	42–42–2	L4
88	September 30	Hawks	9–3	**Wakui** (10–3)	Takeda (2–2)	—	Rakuten Seimei Park	6,051	43–42–2	W1

October: 10–13–3 (Home: 3–4–2; Away: 7–9–1)

#	Date	Opponent	Score	Win	Loss	Save	Stadium	Attendance	Record	Streak
89	October 1	Hawks	1–4	Ishikawa (7–3)	**Matsui** (3–4)	Mori (23)	Rakuten Seimei Park	5,751	43–43–2	L1
90	October 2	@ Buffaloes	4–0	**Matsui** (4–4)	Tomiyama (0–2)	—	Kyocera Dome	6,355	44–43–2	W1
91	October 3	@ Buffaloes	5–3	**Teraoka** (2–0)	Saito (1–1)	**Busenitz** (16)	Kyocera Dome	8,759	45–43–2	W2
92	October 4	@ Buffaloes	2–9	Yamada (3–4)	**Teraoka** (2–1)	—	Kyocera Dome	9,604	45–44–2	L1
93	October 6	@ Fighters	3–5	Uwasawa (8–4)	**T. Norimoto** (5–5)	Miyanishi (5)	Sapporo Dome	3,938	45–45–2	L2
94	October 7	@ Fighters	3−3	Game tied after 10 innings			Sapporo Dome	3,708	45–45–3	T1
95	October 8	@ Fighters	4–1	**Kishi** (3–0)	Martinez (1–6)	**Busenitz** (17)	Sapporo Dome	3,580	46–45–3	W1
96	October 9	Lions	2–5	Neal (4–6)	**Shiomi** (4–7)	Masuda (26)	Rakuten Seimei Park	10,052	46–46–3	L1
—	October 10	Lions	Called after three innings (rain) – Makeup date: October 12				Rakuten Seimei Park	—	—	—
97	October 11	Lions	8–2	**Takinaka** (1–1)	Matsumoto (4–5)	—	Rakuten Seimei Park	8,758	47–46–3	W1
—	October 12	Lions	Postponed (rain) – Makeup date: November 6				Rakuten Seimei Park	—	—	—
98	October 13	@ Marines	3–4	Masuda (3–2)	**Busenitz** (1–2)	—	Zozo Marine Stadium	8,684	47–47–3	L1
99	October 14	@ Marines	4–1	**Wakui** (11–3)	W.Y. Chen (0–1)	**Busenitz** (18)	Zozo Marine Stadium	10,252	48–47–3	W1
100	October 15	@ Marines	6–0	**Kishi** (4–0)	Ojima (7–7)	—	Zozo Marine Stadium	9,044	49–47–3	W2
101	October 16	@ Hawks	3–7	Moore (5–3)	**Shiomi** (4–8)	—	PayPay Dome	15,887	49–48–3	L1
102	October 17	@ Hawks	0–5	Higashihama (8–1)	**Ishibashi** (1–5)	—	PayPay Dome	18,013	49–49–3	L2
103	October 18	@ Hawks	4–11	Moinelo (2–2)	**Makita** (1–2)	—	PayPay Dome	19,657	49–50–3	L3
104	October 20	Buffaloes	2−2	Game tied after 10 innings			Rakuten Seimei Park	5,837	49–50–4	T1
105	October 21	Buffaloes	5–6	Higgins (3–3)	**Matsui** (4–5)	Dickson (15)	Rakuten Seimei Park	6,612	49–51–4	L1
106	October 22	Buffaloes	6–3	**Kishi** (5–0)	Tajima (4–6)	**Makita** (2)	Rakuten Seimei Park	10,414	50–51–4	W1
107	October 23	Fighters	4−4	Game tied after 10 innings			Rakuten Seimei Park	6,109	50–51–5	T1
108	October 24	Fighters	4–5	Hori (2–1)	**Busenitz** (1–3)	Miyanishi (7)	Rakuten Seimei Park	9,617	50–52–5	L1
109	October 25	Fighters	13–4	**Takinaka** (2–1)	Arihara (7–9)	—	Rakuten Seimei Park	10,194	51–52–5	W1
110	October 27	@ Lions	3–4	K. Takahashi (8–8)	**T. Norimoto** (5–6)	Masuda (30)	MetLife Dome	4,480	51–53–5	L1
111	October 28	@ Lions	3–4	Hamaya (3–2)	**Wakui** (11–4)	Masuda (31)	MetLife Dome	4,776	51–54–5	L2
112	October 29	@ Lions	13–5	**Karashima** (1–3)	Neal (5–8)	—	MetLife Dome	5,645	52–54–5	W1
113	October 30	@ Marines	2–1	**Kishi** (6–0)	Sawamura (0–2)	**Matsui** (1)	Zozo Marine Stadium	11,632	53–54–5	W2
114	October 31	@ Marines	3–6	Futaki (8–3)	**Ishibashi** (1–6)	Masuda (30)	Zozo Marine Stadium	13,224	53–55–5	L1

November: 2–2–2 (Home: 1–0–1; Away: 1–2–1)

#	Date	Opponent	Score	Win	Loss	Save	Stadium	Attendance	Record	Streak
115	November 1	@ Marines	3−3	Game tied after 10 innings			Zozo Marine Stadium	12,919	53–55–6	T1
116	November 3	@ Buffaloes	3–6	Yamasaki (5–5)	**T. Norimoto** (5–7)	—	Kyocera Dome	9,759	53–56–6	L1
117	November 4	@ Buffaloes	7–8	Yamada (4–5)	**Busenitz** (1–4)	Urushihara (2)	Kyocera Dome	6,369	53–57–6	L2
118	November 5	@ Buffaloes	4–2	**Makita** (2–2)	Chang (2–4)	**Matsui** (2)	Kyocera Dome	6,555	54–57–6	W1
119	November 6	Lions	4–2	**Kishi** (7–0)	Hamaya (3–3)	—	Rakuten Seimei Park	8,271	55–57–6	W2
120	November 7	Lions	6−6	Game tied after 10 innings			Rakuten Seimei Park	12,380	53–55–7	T1

Win | Loss | Tie | Postponement
**Bold** = Eagles team member

== Roster ==
2020 Tohoku Rakuten Golden Eagles
Roster
Pitchers: 1 Yuki Matsui; 11 Takayuki Kishi; 12 Hiroki Kondo; 13 Kohei Morihara; 14 Takahiro Norimoto; 15 J. T. Chargois; 16 Hideaki Wakui; 17 Takahiro Shiomi; 19 Shoma Fujihira; 20 Tomohiro Anraku; 21 Yoshinao Kamata; 22 Kazuhisa Makita; 23 Hayato Yuge; 28 Tomohito Sakai; 31 Yuya Fukui; 32 Alan Busenitz; 41 Koji Aoyama; 42 DJ Johnson; 43 Sung Chia-hao; 52 Taisei Tsurusaki; 56 Sora Suzuki; 57 Ryota Takinaka; 58 Wataru Karashima; 60 Ryota Ishibashi; 64 Hiroyuki Fukuyama; 68 Kanji Teraoka; 72 Shun Ikeda; 91 Yuya Kubo	Catchers: 2 Hikaru Ohta; 29 Ayatsugu Yamashita; 44 Yuichi Adachi; 55 Takaya Tanaka; 65 Kengo Horiuchi; 67 Takahiro Shimotsuma; 70 Tsuyoshi Ishihara; Infielders: 0 Hiroto Kobukata; 3 Hideto Asamura; 5 Eigoro Mogi; 6 Kazuya Fujita; 7 Daichi Suzuki; 24 Fumiya Kurokawa; 26 Naoto Watanabe; 33 Ginji Akaminai; 34 Tsuyoshi Yamasaki; 36 Yasuhito Uchida; 38 Masaki Iwami; 48 Yoshiaki Watanabe; 66 Itsuki Murabayashi	Outfielders: 8 Ryosuke Tatsumi; 9 Stefen Romero; 25 Kazuki Tanaka; 27 Takero Okajima; 35 Hiroaki Shimauchi; 46 Ko Shimozuru; 51 Yuya Ogo; 54 Ren Wada; 69 Jabari Blash	Manager: 88 Hajime Miki; Coaches: 73 Katsunori Nomura (strategy); 81 Eiji Kanamori (hitting); 96 Teppei Tsuchiya (hitting); 26 Naoto Watanabe (hitting); 84 Tomohito Ito (head pitching); 75 Shinichiro Koyama (pitching); 90 Hidekazu Mitsuyama (battery/defense); 86 Tatsuya Shiokawa (infield defense); 79 Seiji Tomashino (outfield defense)

== Player statistics ==
=== Batting ===
2020 Tohoku Rakuten Golden Eagles batting statistics
Player	G	AB	R	H	2B	3B	HR	RBI	SB	BB	K	AVG	OBP	SLG	TB
Yuichi Adachi	42	60	6	10	1	1	1	3	0	6	15	.167	.242	.267	16
Ginji Akaminai	88	212	16	50	8	0	0	23	3	23	28	.236	.313	.274	58
Hideto Asamura	120	432	72	121	25	0	32	104	1	91	111	.280	.408	.560	242
Jabari Blash	37	119	25	28	7	0	2	18	1	25	46	.235	.369	.345	41
Kazuya Fujita	55	35	3	7	1	0	0	4	0	1	5	.200	.222	.229	8
Kengo Horiuchi	10	7	0	0	0	0	0	0	0	0	4	.000	.000	.000	0
Tsuyoshi Ishihara	18	23	1	4	1	0	0	1	0	0	13	.174	.174	.217	5
Masaki Iwami	16	37	2	8	1	1	1	4	0	1	11	.216	.237	.378	14
Hiroto Kobukata	112	378	61	109	16	5	3	31	17	42	59	.288	.364	.381	144
Fumiya Kurokawa	10	14	0	2	0	0	0	2	0	1	6	.143	.235	.143	2
Eigoro Mogi	73	276	43	83	14	4	7	33	8	39	52	.301	.396	.457	126
Itsuki Murabayashi	3	1	0	0	0	0	0	0	0	0	0	.000	.000	.000	0
Yuya Ogo	58	105	23	31	3	0	4	12	8	19	34	.295	.405	.438	46
Hikaru Ohta	67	130	17	26	10	0	2	16	0	18	38	.200	.301	.323	42
Takero Okajima	35	75	10	15	6	1	0	9	0	8	26	.200	.277	.307	23
Stefen Romero	103	356	46	97	19	2	24	63	0	38	108	.272	.354	.539	192
Hiroaki Shimauchi	114	406	50	114	17	2	8	53	9	48	71	.281	.363	.392	159
Takahiro Shimotsuma	43	77	5	12	4	0	1	9	0	1	26	.156	.165	.247	19
Ko Shimozuru	20	32	1	6	0	1	1	5	0	2	11	.188	.257	.344	11
Daichi Suzuki	120	478	71	141	27	1	4	55	1	46	58	.295	.363	.381	182
Kazuki Tanaka	80	254	38	61	10	1	8	25	6	23	76	.240	.305	.382	97
Takaya Tanaka^{†}	9	15	5	6	0	0	1	4	0	1	7	.400	.438	.600	9
Ryosuke Tatsumi	104	251	38	56	9	3	8	28	11	20	57	.223	.286	.378	95
Yasuhito Uchida	38	93	9	16	3	0	5	18	1	14	31	.172	.284	.366	34
Ren Wada	7	16	0	2	1	0	0	1	0	1	4	.125	.176	.188	3
Naoto Watanabe	1	4	1	2	1	0	0	0	0	0	1	.500	.500	.750	3
Yoshiaki Watanabe	35	85	9	20	5	1	0	12	0	3	15	.235	.258	.318	27
Tsuyoshi Yamasaki	20	12	4	2	1	0	0	1	1	1	2	.167	.214	.250	3
Ayatsugu Yamashita	8	7	1	0	0	0	0	0	0	1	3	.000	.125	.000	0
Total：29 players	120	3,990	557	1,029	190	23	112	534	67	473	918	.258	.341	.401	1,601

^{†}Denotes player joined the team mid-season. Stats reflect time with the Eagles only.
^{‡}Denotes player left the team mid-season. Stats reflect time with the Eagles only.
Bold/italics denotes best in the league

=== Pitching ===
2020 Tohoku Rakuten Golden Eagles pitching statistics
Player	W	L	ERA	G	GS	SV	IP	H	R	ER	BB	K
Tomohiro Anraku	1	0	3.48	27	0	0	31	24	12	12	17	30
Koji Aoyama	2	0	4.35	11	0	0	10.1	11	6	5	6	8
Alan Busenitz	1	4	2.86	46	0	18	44	46	16	14	18	32
J. T. Chargois	0	3	5.81	31	0	1	26.1	23	17	17	14	19
Shoma Fujihira	0	0	—	1	1	0	0	1	2	2	0	0
Yuya Fukui	0	4	5.46	7	7	0	29.2	26	18	18	14	18
Hiroyuki Fukuyama	0	0	0.75	14	0	0	12	12	1	1	5	8
Shun Ikeda	1	0	4.32	21	0	0	16.2	21	8	8	7	13
Ryota Ishibashi	1	6	6.11	13	13	0	63.1	72	43	43	28	46
DJ Johnson^{†}	1	0	3.07	16	0	0	14.2	13	6	5	6	16
Yoshinao Kamata	0	0	9.82	4	0	0	3.2	9	5	4	4	4
Wataru Karashima	1	3	4.93	19	6	1	38.1	43	22	21	15	26
Takayuki Kishi	7	0	3.21	11	11	0	67.1	48	24	24	20	70
Hiroki Kondo	0	0	5.40	6	0	0	6.2	5	4	4	5	4
Yuya Kubo	1	0	13.5	5	0	0	2	4	3	3	0	1
Kazuhisa Makita	2	2	2.16	52	0	2	50	39	15	12	12	33
Yuki Matsui	4	5	3.18	25	10	2	68	56	25	24	28	82
Kohei Morihara	1	2	7.56	17	0	4	16.2	23	14	14	7	14
Takahiro Norimoto	5	7	3.96	18	18	0	109	110	56	48	34	105
Tomohito Sakai	3	2	3.65	46	0	0	44.1	38	20	18	18	34
Takahiro Shiomi	4	8	4.8	16	16	0	84.1	88	45	45	20	63
Sung Chia-hao	1	2	6.94	38	0	0	36.1	35	29	28	17	29
Sora Suzuki	0	0	13.50	2	0	0	1.1	2	2	2	1	1
Ryota Takinaka	2	1	3.40	8	8	0	45	34	18	17	15	29
Kanji Teraoka	2	1	3.15	24	0	0	20	15	7	7	11	14
Taisei Tsurusaki	1	1	4.19	33	0	0	34.1	30	17	16	18	24
Hideaki Wakui	11	4	3.6	20	20	0	130	110	53	52	38	110
Hayato Yuge	3	2	5.01	10	10	0	50.1	57	34	28	20	34
Total：28 players	55	57	4.19	541	120	28	1,055.2	995	522	491	398	867

^{†}Denotes player joined the team mid-season. Stats reflect time with the Eagles only.
^{‡}Denotes player left the team mid-season. Stats reflect time with the Eagles only.
Bold/italics denotes best in the league

== Awards and honors ==
Monthly MVP Award

- Hideaki Wakui - June/July (pitcher)
- Takayuki Kishi - October/November (pitcher)
- Hideto Asamura - September (batter)

Best Nine Award

- Hideto Asamura - second baseman
- Daichi Suzuki - third baseman

Mitsui Golden Glove Award

- Daichi Suzuki - third baseman

Best Battery Award

- Hideaki Wakui and Hikaru Ohta - June/July

SKY PerfecTV! Sayonara Award

- Eigoro Mogi - September (September 11)

== Farm team ==
2020 Eastern League regular season standings
Pos	Team	G	W	L	T	Pct.	GB	Home	Road
1	Tohoku Rakuten Golden Eagles^{†}	79	42	28	9	.600	—	23–13–1	19–15–8
2	Yokohama DeNA BayStars	76	42	32	2	.568	2	22–22–1	20–10–1
3	Yomiuri Giants	79	38	33	8	.535	4½	18–18–5	20–15–3
4	Chiba Lotte Marines	70	34	31	5	.523	5½	14–14–2	20–17–3
5	Tokyo Yakult Swallows	79	32	38	9	.457	10	18–14–5	14–24–4
6	Hokkaido Nippon-Ham Fighters	76	28	41	7	.406	13½	11–20–6	17–21–1
7	Saitama Seibu Lions	75	28	41	6	.406	13½	15–21–3	13–20–3

^{†} League champion

== Nippon Professional Baseball draft ==
2020 Tohoku Rakuten Golden Eagles draft selections
Round	Name	Position	Affiliation	Signed?
1	Takahisa Hayakawa	Pitcher	Waseda University	Yes
2	Koichi Takada	Pitcher	Hosei University	Yes
3	Masaru Fujii	Pitcher	Eneos Holdings	Yes
4	Takuma Uchima	Pitcher	Asia University	Yes
5	Daiki Irie	Infielder	Sendai Ikuei Gakuen High School	Yes
6	Seiryu Uchi	Pitcher	Riseisha High School	Yes
Development players
1	Shun Ishida	Pitcher	Tochigi Golden Braves	Yes
