= Tatsushi =

- Gender: Male

Origin
- Origin: Japanese
- Meaning: Different meanings depending on the kanji used

Tatsushi (written: 達司 or 立嗣) is a masculine Japanese given name. Notable people with the name include:

- Tatsushi Koyanagi (小柳 達司; born 1990), Japanese footballer
- Tatsushi Masuda (増田 達至; born 1988), Japanese baseball pitcher
- Tatsushi Ōmori (大森 立嗣; born 1970), Japanese film director and actor
