= Seaver King =

American baseball player (born 2003)

Washington Nationals
- Third baseman / Outfielder
- Born: April 25, 2003 (age 23); Athens, Georgia, U.S.
- Bats: Right Throws: Right
- Stats at Baseball Reference

Seaver King (born April 25, 2003) is an American professional baseball third baseman and outfielder in the Washington Nationals organization. He played college baseball for the Wake Forest Demon Deacons and Wingate Bulldogs. King was selected tenth overall in the 2024 MLB draft by the Nationals.

== Amateur career ==
King was born on April 25, 2003, in Athens, Georgia, later attending Athens Christian School.

King began his college baseball career at Wingate University. He batted .381 with 18 doubles, four home runs, and 44 RBIs during his freshman season with the Bulldogs and was named first-team All-South Atlantic Conference (SAC). After the season, King played summer collegiate baseball for the Harrisonburg Turks of the Valley Baseball League (VBL) and was named a league all-star and the MVP of the VBL Southern Division. As a sophomore he hit .411 with 91 hits and 53 RBIs and repeated as a first-team All-SAC selection. Following the 2023 season he played collegiate summer baseball with the Harwich Mariners of the Cape Cod Baseball League. He transferred to Wake Forest before his junior year. In his lone season at Wake Forest, King started 60 games and hit .308 with 16 home runs and 64 RBIs.

== Professional career ==
King was selected by the Washington Nationals with the 10th overall pick of the 2024 Major League Baseball draft. On July 19, 2024, he signed with the Nationals on a contract worth $5.15 million.

King made his professional debut after signing with the Fredericksburg Nationals, hitting .295 over twenty games. He was assigned to the Wilmington Blue Rocks to open the 2025 season. In June, he was promoted to the Harrisburg Senators. Over 125 games between the two affiliates, he batted .244 with six home runs, 43 RBIs, and 30 stolen bases. After the season, he played in the Arizona Fall League with the Scottsdale Scorpions and hit .359 with two home runs and 24 RBIs across 18 games.

King returned to Harrisburg to begin the 2026 season and hit .336 with five home runs and 27 RBIs over 35 games. In mid-May, he was promoted to the Rochester Red Wings. King appeared in 77 games with Rochester and batted .289 with 16 home runs and 47 RBIs.
