= Athens Christian School =

Private, coeducational school in Athens, Georgia, United States

Location
- 1270 Highway 29 North; Athens, (Clarke County), Georgia 30601; United States; 34°00′26″N 83°19′35″W

Information
- School type: Private, coeducational Private Christian School
- Motto: "Quality Education in a Christian Atmosphere."
- Religious affiliation: Christian
- Established: 1970
- Founder: Drs. Buhl and Lois Cummings
- School number: (706) 549-7586
- Head of school: Steve Cummings
- Grades: PreKindergarten – 12
- Enrollment: 494 (2021-2022)
  - Grade 9: 48
  - Grade 10: 70
  - Grade 11: 63
  - Grade 12: 41
- Average class size: 19–70
- Student to teacher ratio: 11.7
- Classrooms: 40 +
- Campus type: urban
- Colors: Purple and gold
- Sports: Baseball, basketball, cheerleading, cross country, flag corps, football, golf, soccer, softball, tennis, track, volleyball, wrestling
- Mascot: Golden Eagle
- Team name: Golden Eagles
- Accreditation: Georgia Accrediting Commission
- Website: https://www.athenschristianschool.org/

Athens Christian School (ACS) is a private, PreK–12 non-denominational Christian school located in Athens, Georgia, United States.

== History ==
Radio minister and bookstore owner Buhl Cummings opened Athens Christian School with his wife in 1970. They offered Bible study and opened each day with worship and prayer.

The initial enrollment consisted of white children whose parents wanted to avoid enrolling them in racially integrated public schools. According to historian Ashton Ellett, white elites enrolled their children in Athens Christian School as part of the transition to a class-based system of racial exclusion that was nominally colorblind and revolved around the rhetoric of individual rights, personal freedom, and meritocratic enrollment.

In 1985, Athens Christian School suspend a student for participating in an off-campus theater's production of Jesus Christ Superstar. Headmaster Buhl Cummings explained that school banned dancing because "it inflames the passions of youth". Rock-n-roll music was also banned because the "jungle type beat" was reminiscent of the "drums of Africa where they don't know the gospel".

In 1995, an Athens Christian School representative stated that the school was seeing additional applications in response to Clarke County School District's "controlled choice" plan to reduce school segregation.

== Academics ==
ACS is accredited by the Georgia Accrediting Commission.

== Notable alumni ==
- Alan Busenitz (2008), MLB pitcher
- Seaver King (2021), third baseman and outfielder in the Washington Nationals organization
- Nine Vicious (2020), Rapper, formerly signed to YSL Records, now signed to Create Music Group
