= Shun Ikeda =

Japanese baseball player

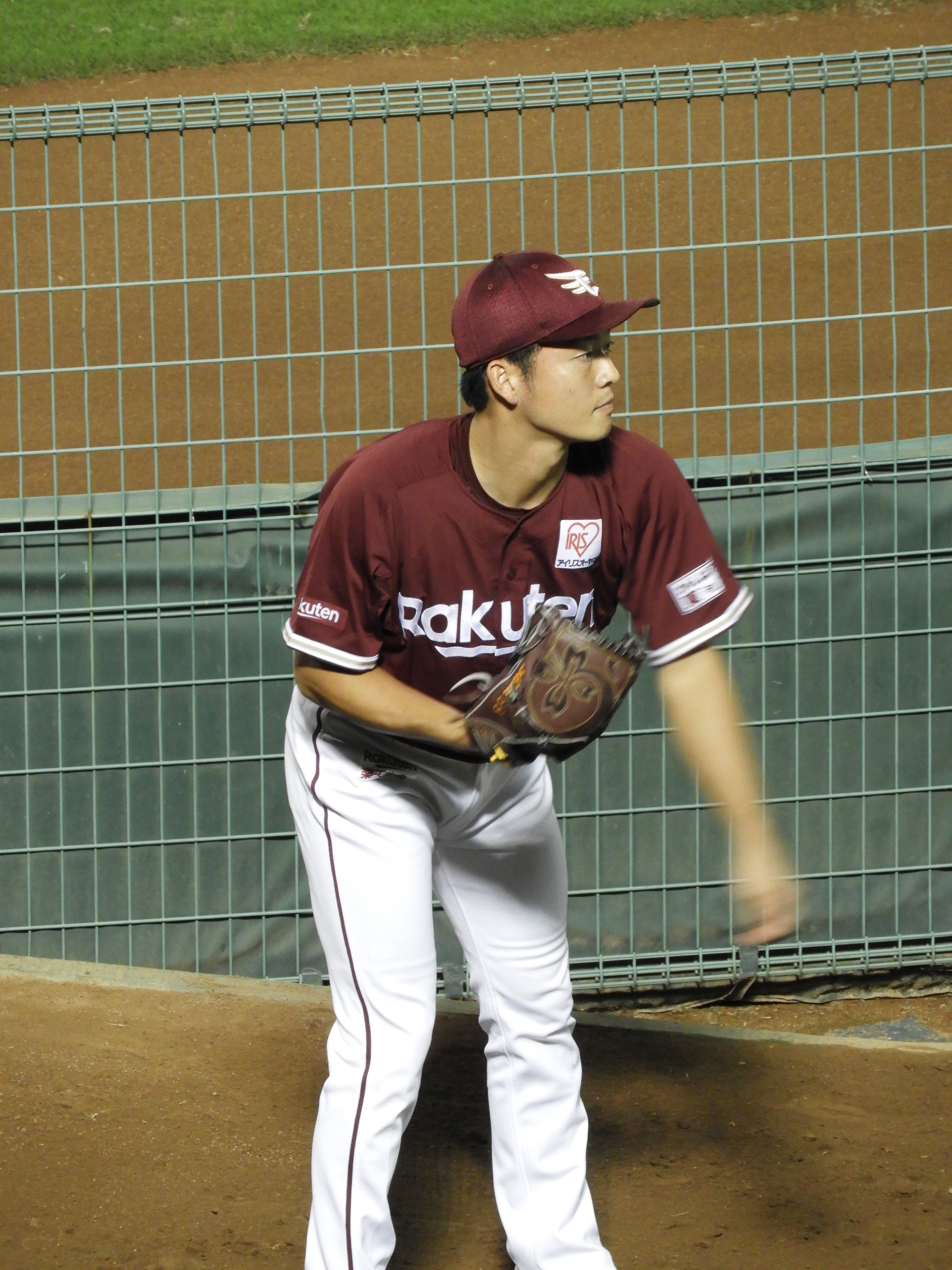
- Ikeda with the Tohoku Rakuten Golden Eagles
- Pitcher
- Born: November 29, 1992 (age 33)
- Batted: Left Threw: Left

NPB debut
- 2017, for the Yomiuri Giants

Last NPB appearance
- October 4, 2020, for the Tohoku Rakuten Golden Eagles

NPB statistics (through 2020)
- Win–loss record: 2-3
- ERA: 3.95
- Strikeouts: 58
- Stats at Baseball Reference

Teams
- Yomiuri Giants (2017–2019); Tohoku Rakuten Golden Eagles (2020)

Shun Ikeda (池田 駿, born November 29, 1992, in Izumozaki, Niigata Prefecture) is a Japanese former professional baseball pitcher. He played in Japan's Nippon Professional Baseball for the Yomiuri Giants from 2017 to 2019 and the Tohoku Rakuten Golden Eagles in 2020.
