= Taishō Tamai =

Japanese baseball player (born 1992)

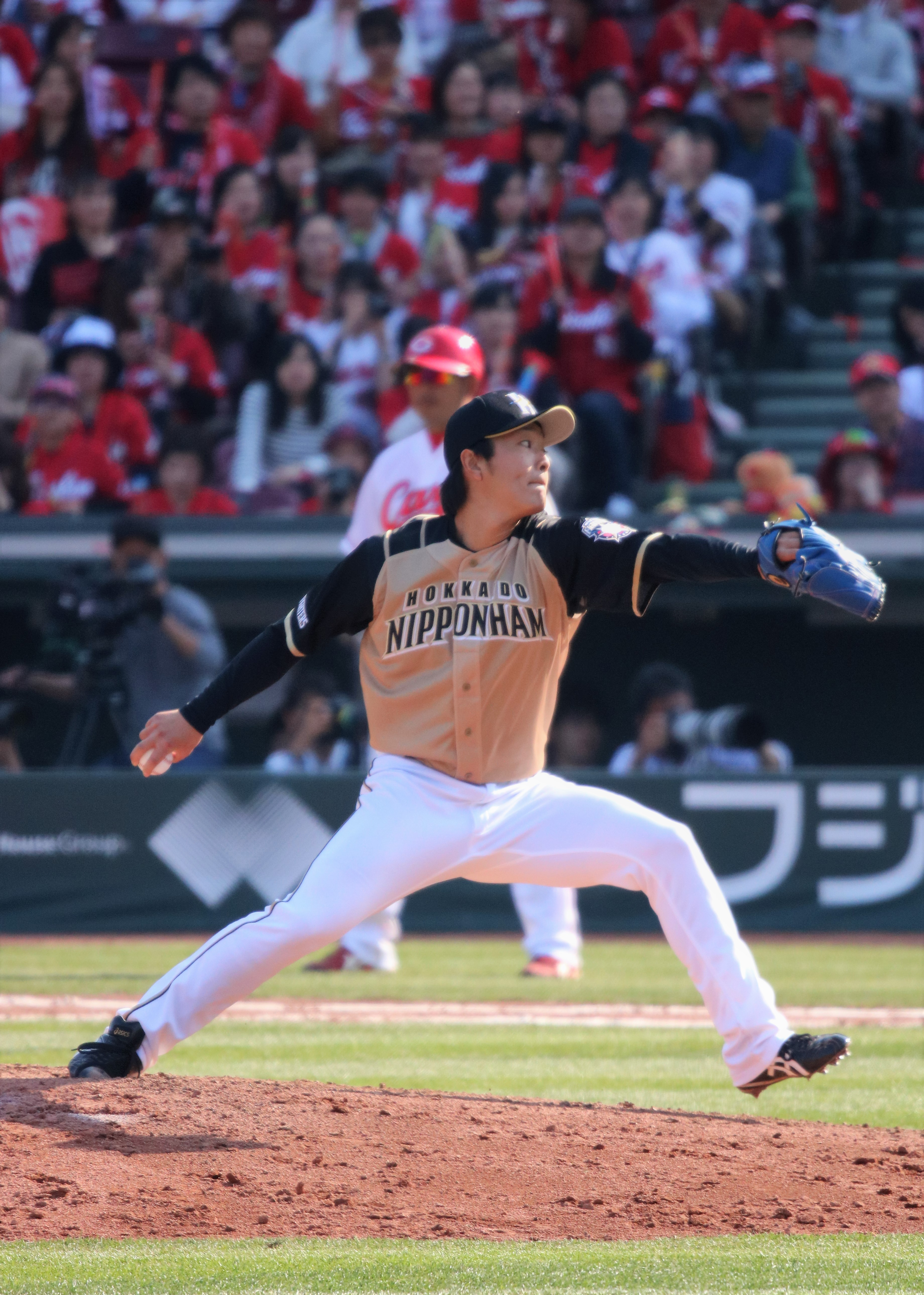

Hokkaido Nippon Ham Fighters – No. 19
- Pitcher
- Born: June 16, 1992 (age 33); Tokoro District, Hokkaido, Japan
- Bats: Right Throws: Right

debut
- May 28, 2017, for the Hokkaido Nippon-Ham Fighters

NPB statistics (through 2023 season)
- Win-loss record: 10-15
- ERA: 3.15
- Strikeouts: 175
- Holds: 72
- Saves: 2
- Stats at Baseball Reference

Teams
- Hokkaido Nippon-Ham Fighters (2017–present)

Taishō Tamai (玉井 大翔, Tamai Taishō; born June 16, 1992 in Tokoro, Hokkaido, Japan) is a professional Japanese baseball player. He plays pitcher for the Hokkaido Nippon-Ham Fighters.
