= Eigoro Mogi =

Japanese baseball player (born 1994)

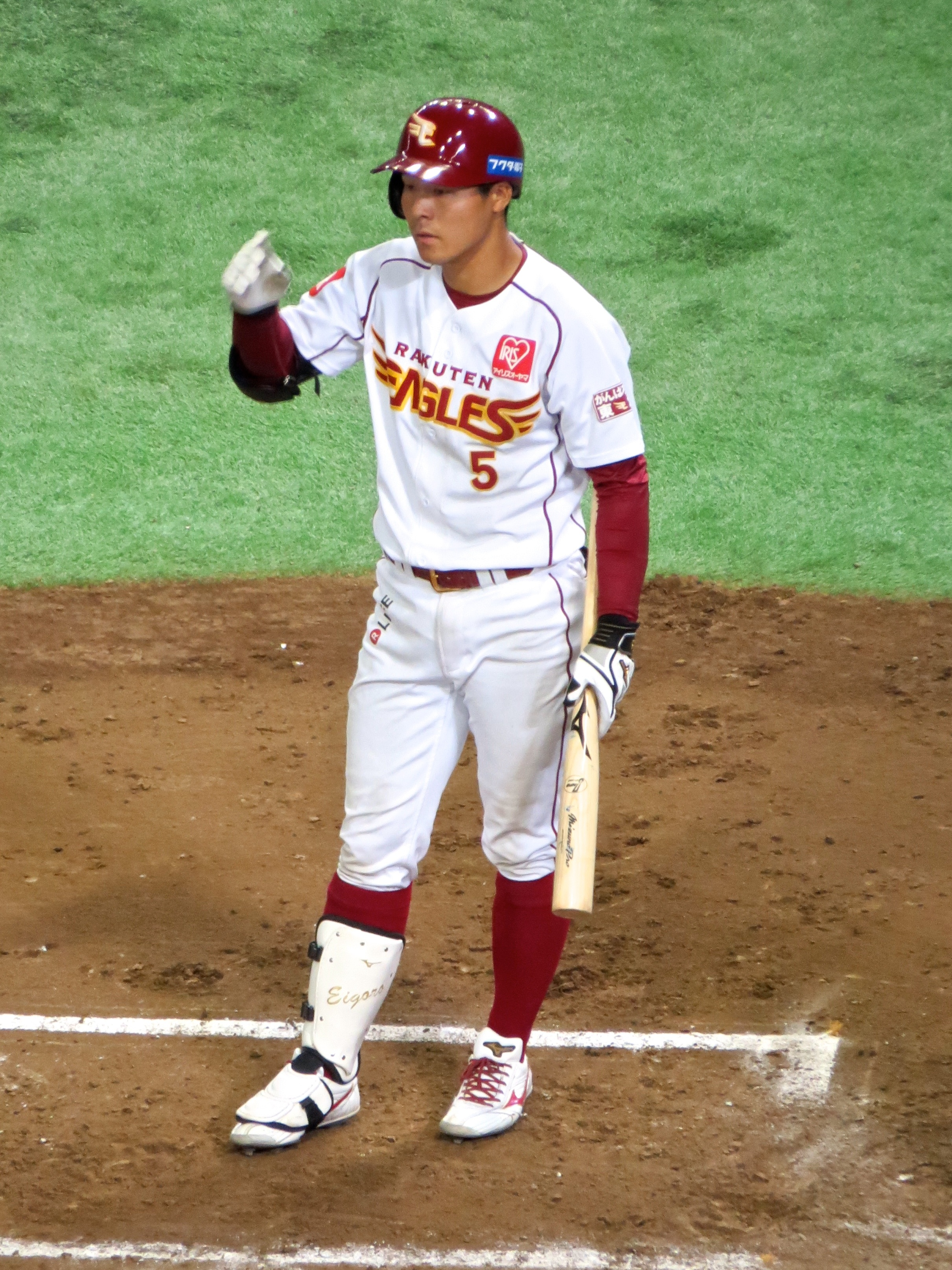
- Mogi with the Tohoku Rakuten Golden Eagles

Tokyo Yakult Swallows – No. 8
- Infielder
- Born: February 14, 1994 (age 32); Japan
- Bats: Left Throws: Right

NPB debut
- March 25, 2016, for the Tohoku Rakuten Golden Eagles

NPB statistics (through 2025 season)
- Batting average: .269
- Hits: 782
- Home runs: 80
- Run batted in: 307
- Stolen bases: 51
- Stats at Baseball Reference

Teams
- Tohoku Rakuten Golden Eagles (2016–2024); Tokyo Yakult Swallows (2025–present)

Career highlights and awards
- NPB All-Star (2019)

Eigoro Mogi (茂木 栄五郎, Mogi Eigorō; born February 14, 1994) is a Japanese professional baseball infielder for the Tokyo Yakult Swallows of Nippon Professional Baseball (NPB). He has previously played in NPB for the Tohoku Rakuten Golden Eagles.

== Career ==
Mogi played in 53 games for the Swallows in 2025, batting .240/.333/.353 with five home runs and 16 RBI. On July 16, 2025, Mogi underwent meniscal surgery on his left knee.
