= Takahiro Shiomi =

Japanese baseball player

- Shiomi with the Tohoku Rakuten Golden Eagles

Tohoku Rakuten Golden Eagles – No. 96
- Pitcher / Coach
- Born: September 6, 1988 (age 37)
- Batted: Left Threw: Left

NPB debut
- May 5, 2011, for the Tohoku Rakuten Golden Eagles

Last NPB appearance
- September 21, 2023, for the Tohoku Rakuten Golden Eagles

NPB statistics
- Win–loss record: 46-57
- ERA: 3.80
- Strikeouts: 648
- Stats at Baseball Reference

Teams
- As player: Tohoku Rakuten Golden Eagles (2011–2023); As coach: Tohoku Rakuten Golden Eagles (2026–present)

Takahiro Shiomi (塩見 貴洋, born September 6, 1988, in Moriguchi, Osaka) is a Japanese professional baseball pitcher for the Tohoku Rakuten Golden Eagles in Japan's Nippon Professional Baseball.
