= Kazuhisa Makita =

Japanese baseball player (born 1984)

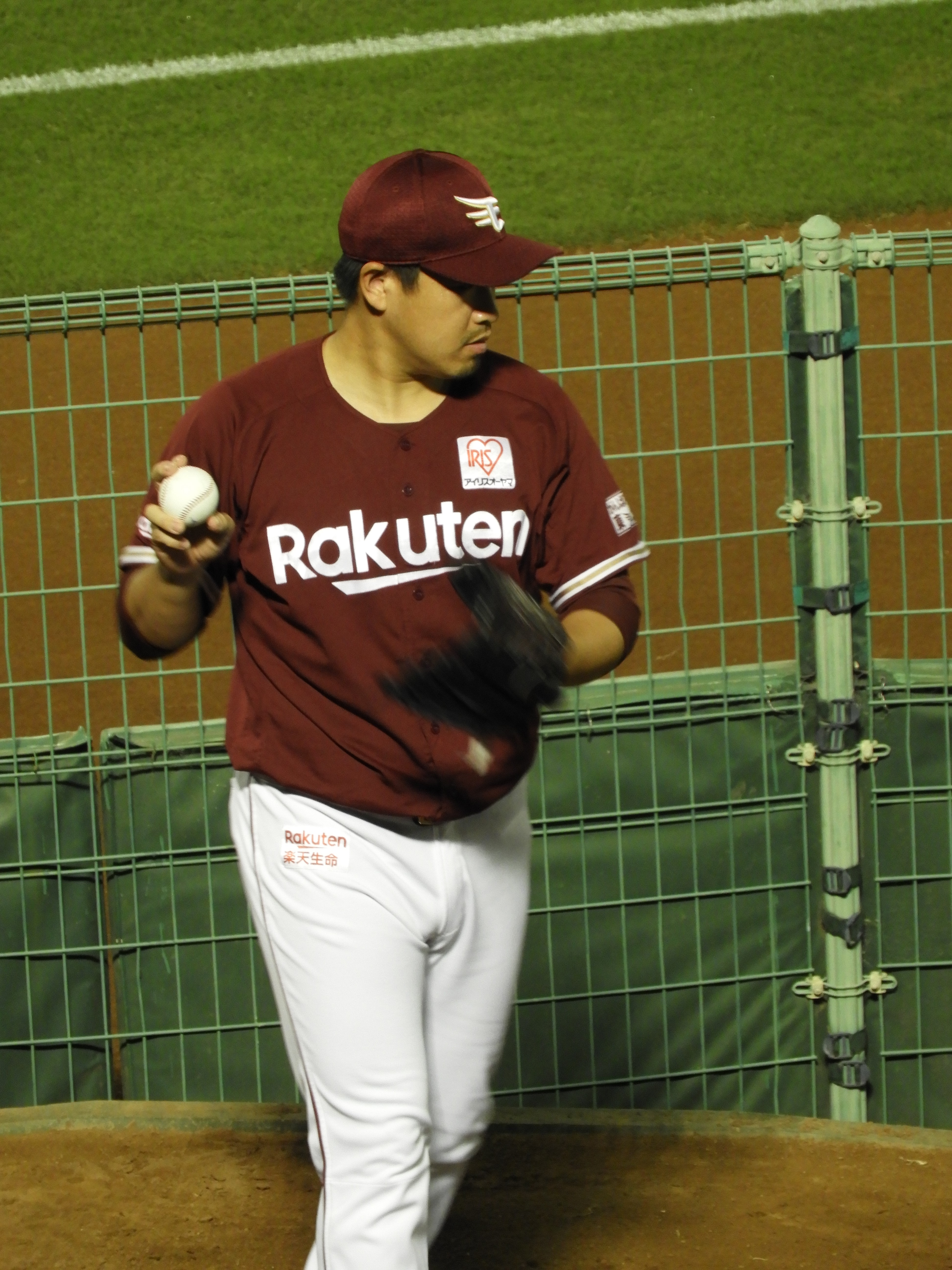
- Makita with the Tohoku Rakuten Golden Eagles

Fukuoka SoftBank Hawks – No. 97
- Pitcher / Coach
- Born: November 10, 1984 (age 41); Yaizu, Shizuoka, Japan
- Batted: Right Threw: Right

Professional debut
- NPB: 2011, for the Saitama Seibu Lions
- MLB: March 30, 2018, for the San Diego Padres
- CPBL: July 12, 2022, for the CTBC Brothers

Last appearance
- NPB: September 3, 2021, for the Tohoku Rakuten Golden Eagles
- MLB: September 29, 2018, for the San Diego Padres
- CPBL: August 6, 2022, for the CTBC Brothers

NPB statistics
- Win–loss record: 55–51
- Earned run average: 2.81
- Strikeouts: 552

MLB statistics
- Win–loss record: 0–1
- Earned run average: 5.40
- Strikeouts: 37

CPBL statistics
- Win–loss record: 0–0
- Earned run average: 8.44
- Strikeouts: 4
- Stats at Baseball Reference

Teams
- As player: Saitama Seibu Lions (2011–2017); San Diego Padres (2018); Tohoku Rakuten Golden Eagles (2020–2021); CTBC Brothers (2022); As coach: Fukuoka SoftBank Hawks (2024–present)

Career highlights and awards
- As player: 2011 Pacific League Rookie of the Year; 4× NPB All-Star (2011, 2013, 2016, 2017); As coach: Japan Series champion (2025)
Medals
Men's baseball
Representing Japan
2015 WBSC Premier12
Bronze medal – third place	2015 Tokyo	Team

Kazuhisa Makita (牧田 和久, Makita Kazuhisa; born November 10, 1984) is a Japanese former professional baseball pitcher, and current the third squad pitching coach for the Fukuoka SoftBank Hawks of Nippon Professional Baseball (NPB). He played in NPB for the Saitama Seibu Lions and Tohoku Rakuten Golden Eagles. He also played in Major League Baseball (MLB) for the San Diego Padres, and in the Chinese Professional Baseball League (CPBL) for the CTBC Brothers.

== Career ==
=== Saitama Seibu Lions ===
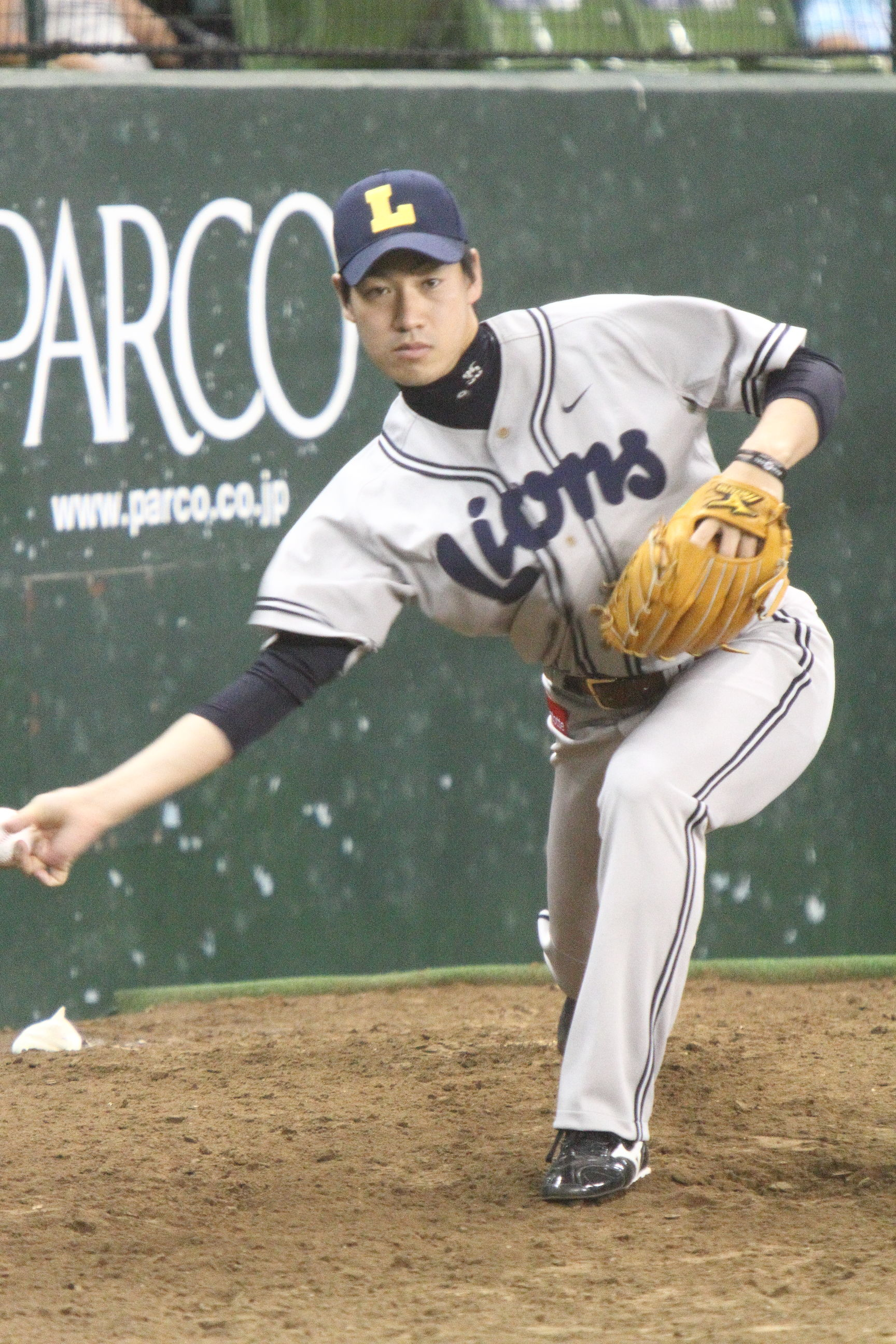
Makita with the Saitama Seibu Lions

Makita played collegiately at Heisei Kokusai University but was not drafted out college. He went on to play for Nippon Express in the Japanese industrial leagues for several years after college before being selected by the Saitama Seibu Lions with their second pick in the 2010 Nippon Professional Baseball draft. Makita made his professional debut in 2011 with Seibu, logging a 5–7 record and 2.61 ERA with 22 saves in 55 appearances, and earned Pacific League Rookie of the Year honors, as well as being named an NPB All-Star. In 2012, Makita improved upon the previous year, recording a 13–9 record and 2.43 ERA in 27 appearances. In 2013, Makita was named an NPB All-Star for the second time in his career after pitching to an 8–9 record and 2.60 ERA with 87 strikeouts in 166.0 innings of work. In 2014, Makita logged an 8-9 record and 3.74 ERA with 89 strikeouts in 170.2 innings pitched. The next year, Makita pitched in 34 games for the Lions, registering a 9–11 record and 3.66 ERA in 137.2 innings. In the 2016 season, Makita posted a stellar 7–1 record and 1.60 ERA with 43 strikeouts in 78.2 innings across 50 contests. In 2017, Makita pitched to a 3–3 record and 2.30 ERA with 35 strikeouts in 62.2 innings of work.

In seven seasons with the Saitama Seibu Lions, Makita compiled a career 2.83 earned run average (ERA) with 514 strikeouts and 206 walks in 921 1/3 innings.

On December 1, 2017, the Lions announced that they would be posting Makita to be made available to MLB teams before the end of the month.

=== San Diego Padres ===
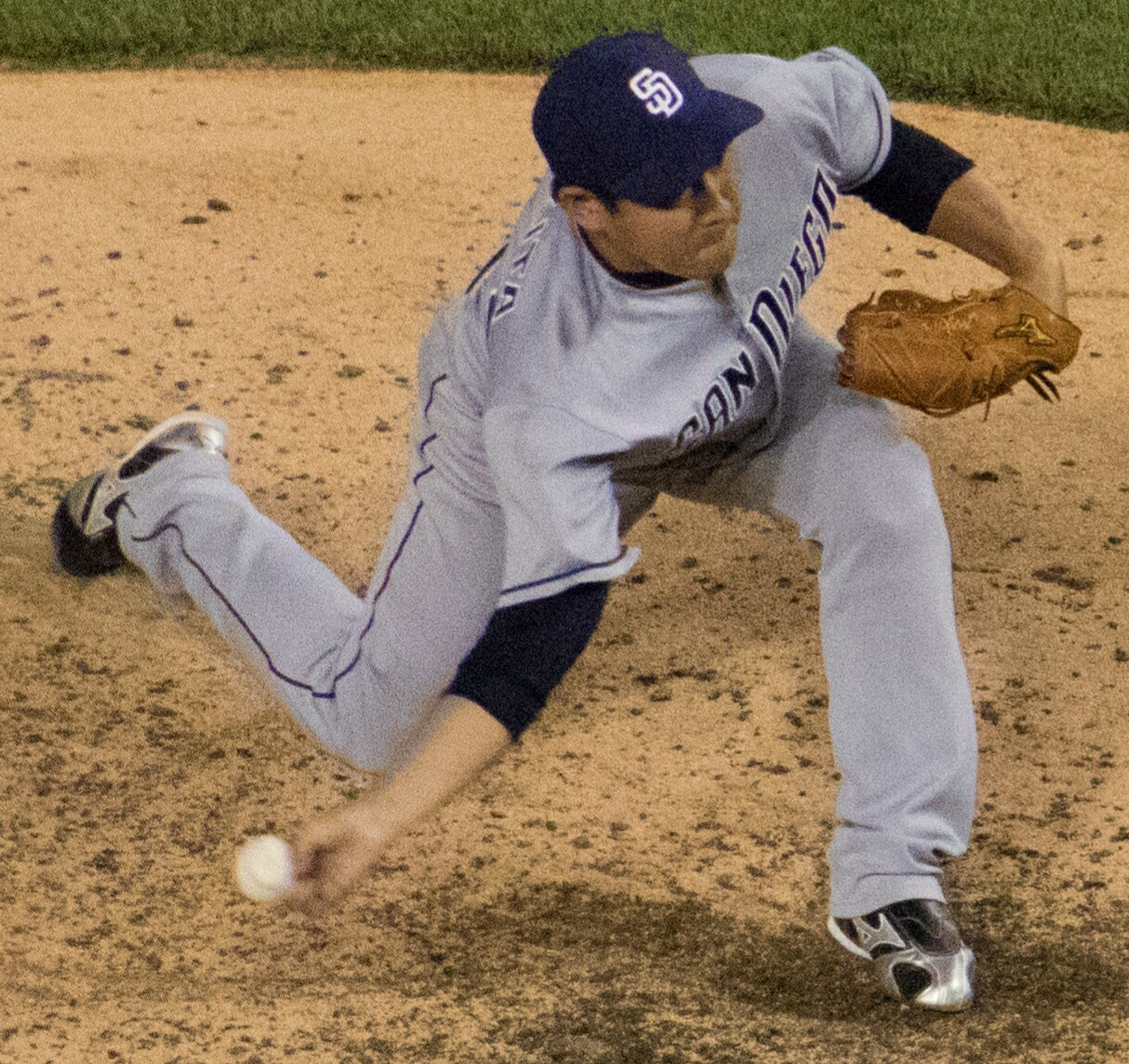
Makita with the San Diego Padres

On January 6, 2018, Makita signed a two-year contract with the San Diego Padres. He made 27 appearances in the 2018 season, registering an ERA of 5.40 in 35 innings. On November 2, 2018, Makita was designated for assignment by the Padres.

Makita was invited to Spring Training as a non-roster invitee in 2019 and was assigned to the Double-A Amarillo Sod Poodles to begin the year. Makita had his contract selected to the active roster by the Padres on June 17, 2019, but was designated for assignment the next day without making an appearance for the club. He was outrighted to Amarillo on June 25. He spent the remainder of the 2019 season split between Amarillo and the Triple-A El Paso Chihuahuas, and logged a 6-3 record and 3.33 ERA with 67 strikeouts in 70.1 innings between the two teams. He elected free agency on October 1.

=== Tohoku Rakuten Golden Eagles ===
On November 26, 2019, Makita signed with the Tohoku Rakuten Golden Eagles of Nippon Professional Baseball. In 2020 with the Eagles, Makita pitched to a 2-2 record and 2.16 ERA in 52 appearances. He was released by Rakuten on October 26, 2021.

=== CTBC Brothers ===
On May 2, 2022, Makita signed with the CTBC Brothers of the Chinese Professional Baseball League. In 6 games, Makita struggled to an 8.44 ERA with 4 strikeouts in 5 1/3 innings pitched. He was released by the Brothers on September 13.

On October 25, 2022, Makita announced his retirement from professional baseball.

=== After retirement ===
On October 31, 2023, Makita served as the third squad pitching coach of the Fukuoka SoftBank Hawks.

== International career ==
Makita played for the Japan national baseball team in the 2013 World Baseball Classic, 2014 MLB Japan All-Star Series, 2015 exhibition series against Europe, 2015 WBSC Premier12, and 2017 World Baseball Classic as a relief pitcher.

In 2014, Makita was one of four pitchers who combined to throw a no-hitter for Samurai Japan against a team of Major League players in the MLB-Japan All-Star Series at the Tokyo Dome.

== Playing style ==
With an unconventional submarine delivery, Makita throws a fastball which sits at 80 mph (tops out at 84–85 mph), a sinker (shuuto), a slider, and a curveball. Makita's pace is very quick; he took approximately eight seconds between pitches in 2016, making him the fastest-working pitcher in NPB that season.
