= Daichi Suzuki (baseball) =

Japanese baseball player (born 1989)

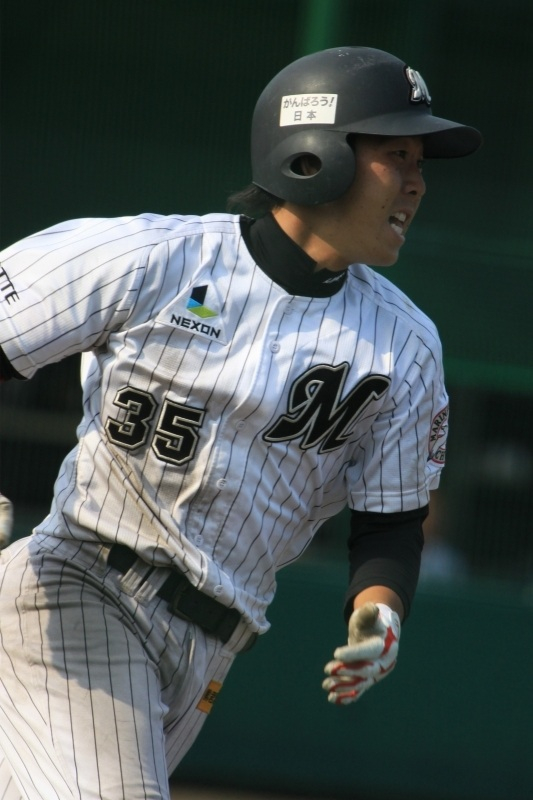
- Suzuki with the Chiba Lotte Marines

Tohoku Rakuten Golden Eagles – No. 7
- Infielder
- Born: August 18, 1989 (age 36); Suntō District, Shizuoka, Japan
- Bats: Left Throws: Right

NPB debut
- June 2, 2012, for the Chiba Lotte Marines

Career statistics (through 2023 season)
- Batting average: .273
- Hits: 1,459
- Home runs: 78
- Runs batted in: 554
- Stolen base: 38
- Stats at Baseball Reference

Teams
- Chiba Lotte Marines (2012–2019); Tohoku Rakuten Golden Eagles (2020–present)

Career highlights and awards
- 3× Pacific League Best Nine Award (2013, 2016); 1× Mitsui Golden Glove Award (2017); 5× NPB All-Star selection (2013, 2014, 2016, 2019, 2024); Interleague play PL Nippon Life Award Winner (2019)

Daichi Suzuki (鈴木 大地, Suzuki Daichi; born August 18, 1989) is a Japanese professional baseball infielder for the Tohoku Rakuten Golden Eagles of Nippon Professional Baseball (NPB). He has previously played in NPB for the Chiba Lotte Marines.

== Career ==
On November 18, 2019, Suzuki signed with the Tohoku Rakuten Golden Eagles.
