= Stefen Romero =

American baseball player (born 1988)

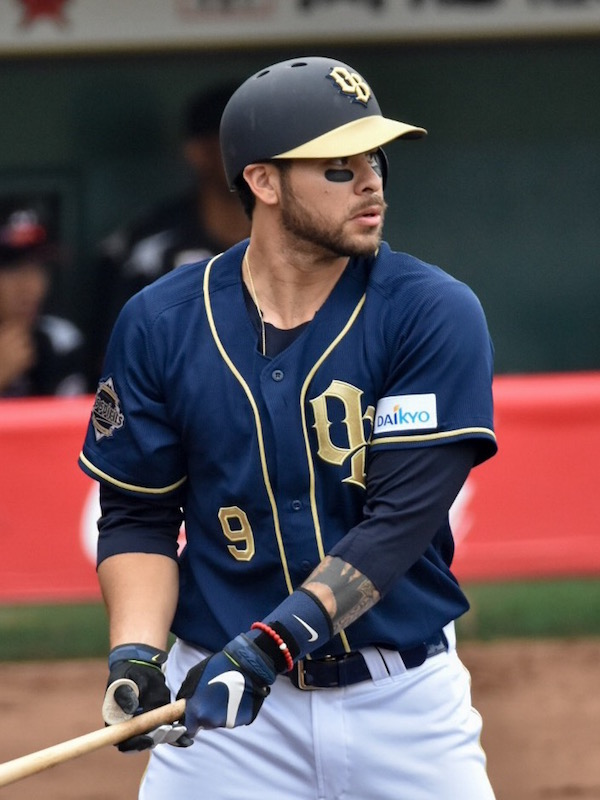
- Romero with the Orix Buffaloes
- Right fielder
- Born: October 17, 1988 (age 37); Tucson, Arizona, U.S.
- Batted: Right Threw: Right

Professional debut
- MLB: April 1, 2014, for the Seattle Mariners
- NPB: March 31, 2017, for the Orix Buffaloes

Last appearance
- MLB: August 19, 2016, for the Seattle Mariners
- NPB: July 2, 2021, for the Orix Buffaloes

MLB statistics
- Batting average: .195
- Home runs: 4
- Runs batted in: 17

NPB statistics
- Batting average: .264
- Home runs: 96
- Runs batted in: 264
- Stats at Baseball Reference

Teams
- Seattle Mariners (2014–2016); Orix Buffaloes (2017–2019); Tohoku Rakuten Golden Eagles (2020); Orix Buffaloes (2021)

Stefen Daniel Romero (STEFF-ehn, born October 17, 1988) is an American former professional baseball right fielder. He played for the Seattle Mariners in Major League Baseball (MLB) and Tohoku Rakuten Golden Eagles and Orix Buffaloes in Nippon Professional Baseball (NPB).

== Career ==
=== Amateur ===
Romero attended Sunnyside High School in Tucson, Arizona. Playing for the school's baseball team, he earned an all-southern Arizona honorable mention from the Tucson Citizen following his senior season. He also played for the school's basketball team.

Romero enrolled at Pima Community College. After playing college baseball at Pima for two years, he transferred to Oregon State University, where he played for the Oregon State Beavers baseball team. In 2009, he played collegiate summer baseball with the Bourne Braves of the Cape Cod Baseball League. He had a .326 batting average in 2010, and was named to the All-Pac-10 Conference First Team.

=== Seattle Mariners ===
The Seattle Mariners drafted Romero in the 12th round, with the 372nd overall selection, of the 2010 Major League Baseball draft. He made his professional debut in 2011 with the Single-A Clinton LumberKings, logging a .280/.342/.462 slash line with 16 home runs and 65 RBI.

In 2012, Romero was the Mariners Minor League Player of the Year after he hit .352/.391/.599 with 23 home runs and 101 runs batted in with the Jackson Generals of the Double-A Southern League. He was assigned to the Tacoma Rainiers of the Triple-A Pacific Coast League in 2013, but started the season on the disabled list with an oblique injury. On November 20, the Mariners added Romero to their 40-man roster to protect him from the Rule 5 draft.

In 2014, Romero made the Mariners' Opening Day roster, and made his major league debut on April 1. He struggled, batting .192 in 73 games. He began the 2015 season in Tacoma, playing in 116 games for the team, and also went 4-for-21 in 24 plate appearances for the Mariners. He began the 2016 season in Tacoma, and went 4-for-17 in 19 plate appearances for the Mariners that year.

On November 19, the Mariners released Romero to allow him to pursue an opportunity to play in Japan.

=== Orix Buffaloes ===
He signed with the Orix Buffaloes of Nippon Professional Baseball's Pacific League on November 24, 2016. In 2017, Romero slashed .274/.330/.508 with 26 home runs and 66 RBI. He signed a three-year contract extension with the Buffaloes on August 4, 2017, earning $2.5 million per season. In 2018, Romero batted .237/.313/.451 with 25 home runs and 63 RBI. In 2019, Romero played in 81 games for Orix, batting .305/.363/.539 with 18 home runs and 63 RBI. On December 2, 2019, he became a free agent.

=== Tohoku Rakuten Golden Eagles ===
On January 27, 2020, Romero signed with the Rakuten Golden Eagles of Nippon Professional Baseball(NPB). On February 15, 2020, he held press conference. On the year, Romero slashed .272/.354/.539 with 24 home runs and 63 RBI for Rakuten. On December 2, he became a free agent.

=== Orix Buffaloes (second stint) ===
On January 8, 2021, Romero signed a one-year contract to return to the Orix Buffaloes of NPB. Due to the influence of COVID-19, he was in a situation where his family could not come to Japan and lived away from his family. The Buffaloes acknowledged his desire to prioritize his family and he decided to leave the team on August 3.

=== Los Angeles Dodgers ===
On February 12, 2022, Romero signed a minor league contract with the Los Angeles Dodgers. After beginning the season with the Triple-A Oklahoma City Dodgers he was added to the major league roster on June 22. Romero was designated for assignment on June 25, without appearing in a game. He cleared waivers and was sent outright to Triple-A Oklahoma City on June 27. Romero played in 30 games for Oklahoma City, hitting .265/.353/.431 with three home runs and 22 RBI before he was placed on the injured list on July 9 and stayed there the rest of the season. He elected free agency following the season on November 10.

=== Diablos Rojos del México ===
On March 6, 2023, Romero signed with the Diablos Rojos del México of the Mexican League. In 36 games for México, he slashed .322/.403/.568 with eight home runs and 28 RBI.

Romero was placed on the reserve list on March 23, 2024, and did not appear in a game for the team. The Diablos would go on to win the Serie del Rey. Romero retired from professional baseball on November 19.

== Personal life ==
Stefen's younger brother, Santiago, was a teammate on their high school baseball team.
