= Hayato Yuge =

Japanese baseball player (born 1994)

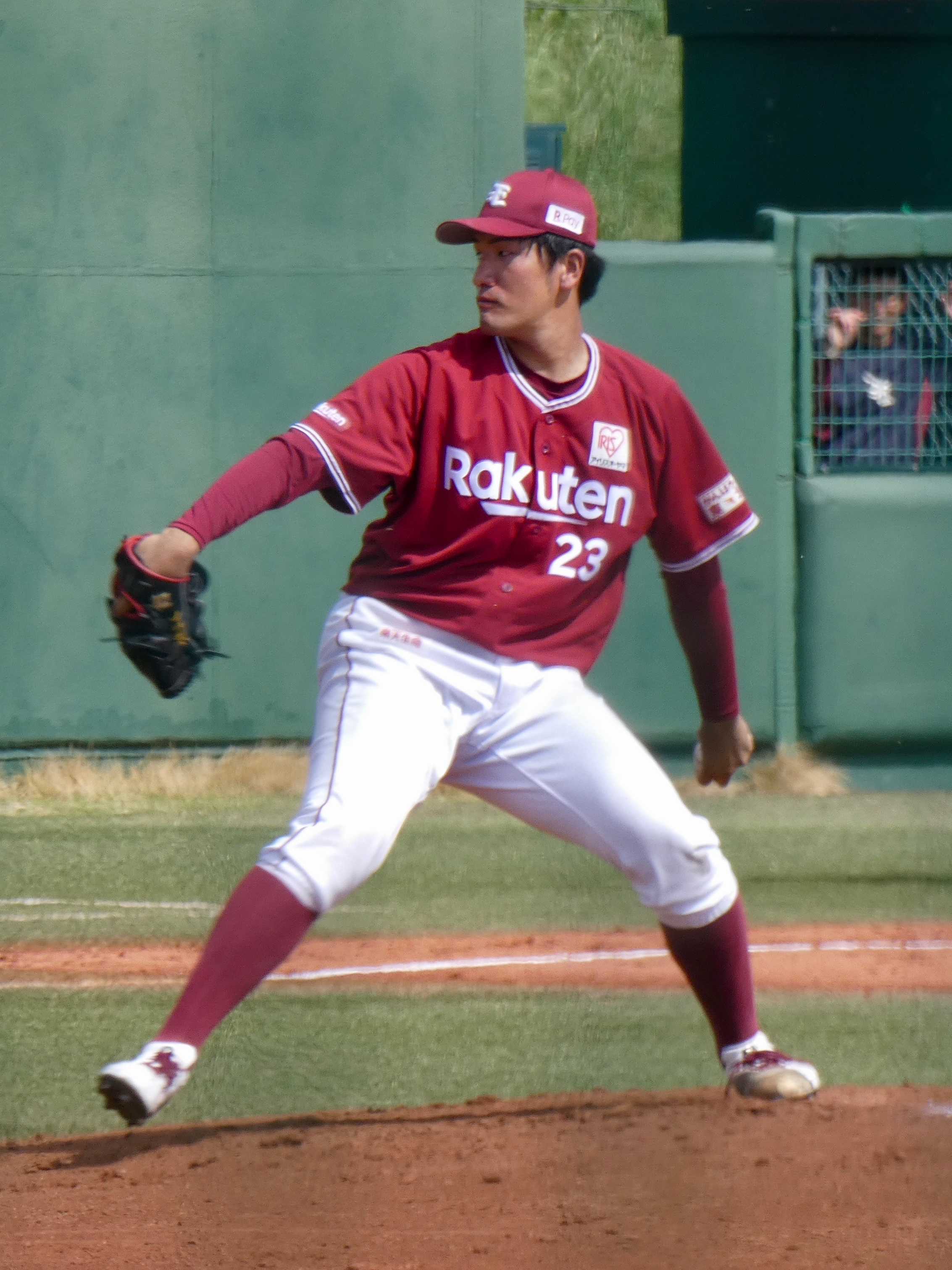
- Yuge with the Tohoku Rakuten Golden Eagles
- Pitcher
- Born: April 6, 1994 (age 32)
- Batted: Left Threw: Left

NPB debut
- April 4, 2019, for the Tohoku Rakuten Golden Eagles

Last NPB appearance
- September 11, 2024, for the Tohoku Rakuten Golden Eagles

NPB statistics
- Win–loss record: 9-7
- ERA: 4.94
- Strikeouts: 112
- Stats at Baseball Reference

Teams
- Tohoku Rakuten Golden Eagles (2019–2024)

Hayato Yuge (弓削 隼人, (born April 6, 1994) is a Japanese former professional baseball pitcher. He played for the Tohoku Rakuten Golden Eagles in Japan's Nippon Professional Baseball (NPB) from 2019 to 2024.
