= Yugo Bandoh =

Japanese baseball player (born 1995)

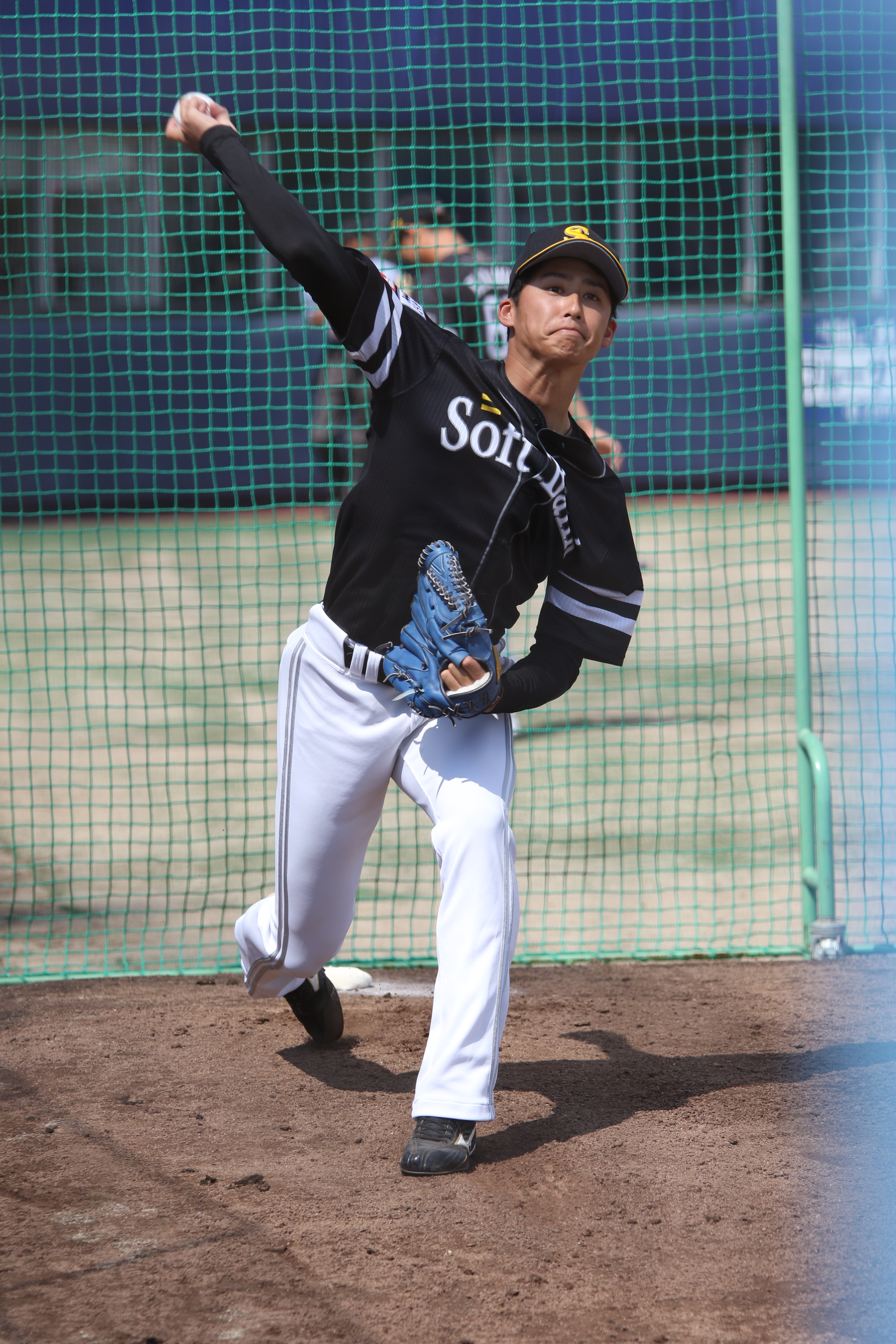
- Bandoh with the Fukuoka SoftBank Hawks

Yomiuri Giants – No. 050
- Pitcher
- Born: December 27, 1995 (age 30); Naruto, Tokushima, Japan
- Bats: Right Throws: Right

NPB debut
- July 14, 2020, for the Fukuoka SoftBank Hawks

NPB statistics (through 2023 season)
- Win–loss record: 10-11
- ERA: 2.91
- Strikeouts: 176
- Stats at Baseball Reference

Teams
- Fukuoka SoftBank Hawks (2019–2025); Yomiuri Giants (2026–present)

Career highlights and awards
- Japan Series champion (2025)

Yugo Bandoh (板東 湧梧, Bandō Yūgo; born December 27, 1995 in Naruto, Tokushima, Japan) is a Japanese professional baseball Pitcher for the Fukuoka SoftBank Hawks of Nippon Professional Baseball (NPB).

== Early career ==
Bandoh participated in the 84th Japanese High School Baseball Invitational Tournament in the spring of his 2nd grade, the 94th Japanese High School Baseball Championship in the summer of his 2nd grade, the 85th Japanese High School Baseball Invitational Tournament in the spring of his 3rd grade, and the 95th Japanese High School Baseball Championship in the summer of 3rd grade, as a pitcher for Naruto High School.

== Professional career ==
On October 25, 2018, Bandoh was drafted by the Fukuoka SoftBank Hawks in the 2018 Nippon Professional Baseball draft. During the 2019 season, Bandoh pitched in the Western League of NPB's minor leagues.

On July 14, 2020, Bandoh debuted in the Pacific League against the Orix Buffaloes as a relief pitcher. In the match against the Tohoku Rakuten Golden Eagles on August 6, he pitched as a relief pitcher and became his first Winning pitcher. He also recorded his first Hold on August 14. However, he developed inflammation of his right elbow on September 12, left the team for treatment, and underwent surgery on his right elbow on October 13. During the 2020 season, Bandoh recorded 15 games pitched, a 2–2 win–loss record, a 2.56 ERA, 2 holds, and 29 strikeouts in 31.2 innings.

On August 22, 2021, he pitched against the Chiba Lotte Marines and recorded his first Save. In 2021 season, he contributed to the team as a setup man, and finished the regular season with a 44 Games pitched, a 0–2 Win–loss record, a 2.52 ERA, a 16 Holds, a one Save, and a 41 strikeouts in 39.1 innings.

In 2022 season, Bandoh was appointed as a starter pitcher from the middle of the season, and recorded a shutout victory against the Chiba Lotte Marines on September 24. And he finished the regular season with a 25 Games pitched, a 3–3 Win–loss record, a 3.18 ERA, a 3 Holds, and a 48 strikeouts in 62.1 innings.

In 2023 season, Bandoh He contributed to the team as a relief pitcher, but was appointed as the starting pitcher in the game against the Tokyo Yakult Swallows on June 15. He finished the regular season with a 30 Games pitched, a 5-4 Win–loss record, a 3.04 ERA, a one holds, and a 58 strikeouts in 83 innings.
