= Tyler Higgins =

American baseball player (born 1991)

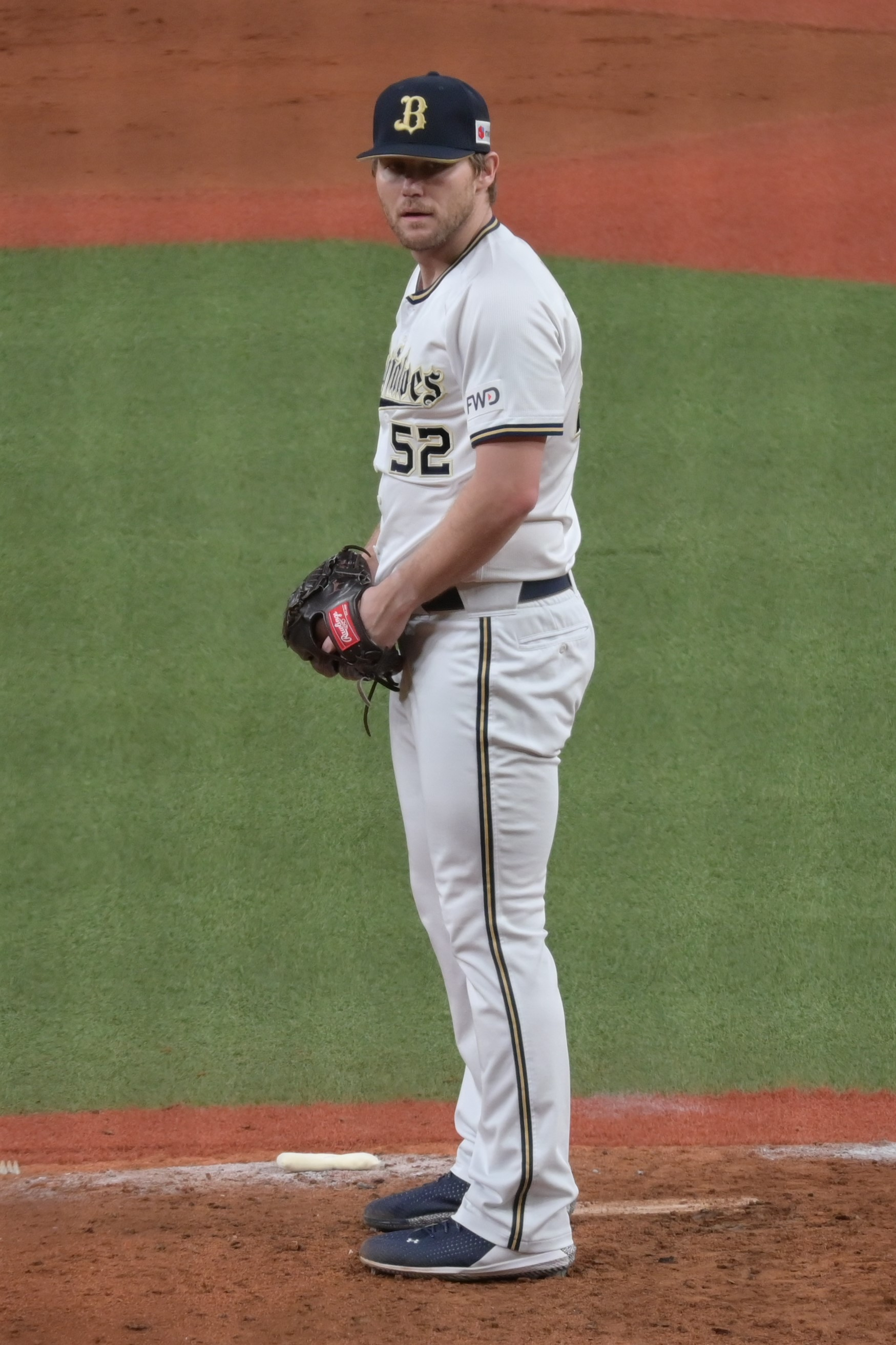
- Higgins with the Orix Buffaloes
- Pitcher
- Born: April 22, 1991 (age 34); Flint, Michigan, U.S.
- Batted: Right Threw: Right

NPB debut
- June 26, 2020, for the Orix Buffaloes

Last NPB appearance
- October 21, 2021, for the Orix Buffaloes

NPB statistics
- Win–loss record: 4-5
- Earned run average: 2.46
- Strikeouts: 81
- Stats at Baseball Reference

Teams
- Orix Buffaloes (2020–2021)

Tyler E. Higgins (born April 22, 1991) is an American former professional baseball pitcher. He played in Nippon Professional Baseball (NPB) for the Orix Buffaloes. He currently serves as the pitching coach for the Clearwater Threshers.

== Playing career ==
=== Florida/Miami Marlins ===
The Florida Marlins chose Higgins in the 23rd round, 703rd overall, in the 2011 Major League Baseball draft. Higgins made his professional debut with the rookie-level Gulf Coast League Marlins. In 2012, Higgins split the year between the GCL Marlins and the High-A Jupiter Hammerheads, pitching to a 2.57 ERA in 23 appearances. He spent the 2013 season in Jupiter, recording a 2-7 record and 4.01 ERA in 45 games. Higgins spent the 2014 season in Double-A with the Jacksonville Suns, registering a 4.97 ERA in 29 innings of work.

In 2015, Higgins split the year between Jacksonville and Jupiter, accumulating a 3.55 ERA with 41 strikeouts in 50 2/3 innings pitched. He spent the entirety of the 2016 season in Jacksonville, pitching to a 3-5 record and 3.45 ERA with 45 strikeouts in 44 appearances. In 2017, Higgins again spent the year in Jacksonville, posting a 3-3 record and 3.43 ERA in 60 1/3 innings pitched across 34 games. He elected free agency following the season on November 6, 2017.

=== New Britain Bees ===
On March 27, 2018, Higgins signed with the New Britain Bees of the Atlantic League of Professional Baseball. Higgins pitched to a stellar 1.88 ERA in 14 appearances for New Britain.

=== Seattle Mariners ===
On June 1, 2018, Higgins' contract was purchased by the Seattle Mariners organization and was assigned to the Triple-A Tacoma Rainiers. In 28 games for Tacoma, he posted a 2.83 ERA with 38 strikeouts. Higgins elected free agency following the season on November 2.

=== San Diego Padres ===
On December 21, 2018, Higgins signed a minor league contract with the San Diego Padres organization. He split the season between the Triple-A El Paso Chihuahuas and the Double-A Amarillo Sod Poodles, recording a 5-1 record and 4.75 ERA between the two clubs. On December 18, 2019, Higgins was released by the Padres.

=== Orix Buffaloes ===
On December 23, 2019, Higgins signed with the Orix Buffaloes of the Nippon Professional Baseball (NPB). On June 26, 2020, Higgins made his NPB debut. In 41 appearances for Orix, Higgins pitched to a 2.40 ERA with 45 strikeouts. On February 11, 2021, Higgins tested positive for COVID-19. Higgins made 49 appearances for Orix in 2021, logging a 2.53 ERA with 36 strikeouts in 46 1/3 innings of work. Higgins became a free agent following the season.

=== San Diego Padres (second stint) ===
On March 7, 2022, Higgins signed a minor league contract to return to the San Diego Padres organization. In 24 games for the Triple–A El Paso Chihuahuas, he posted a 4.97 ERA with 24 strikeouts across 25 1/3 innings of work. Higgins was released by San Diego on July 12.

=== High Point Rockers ===
On August 4, 2022, Higgins signed with the High Point Rockers of the Atlantic League of Professional Baseball. In 15 relief appearances for the Rockers, he posted a strong 1.72 ERA with 19 strikeouts and 4 saves across 15 2/3 innings pitched. Higgins became a free agent after the season.

== Coaching career ==
=== Philadelphia Phillies ===
On February 5, 2024, Higgins was hired by the Philadelphia Phillies to serve as the pitching coach for their Triple–A affiliate, the Lehigh Valley IronPigs. On February 7, 2025, Higgins was named a pitching coach for Philadelphia's Single-A affiliate, the Clearwater Threshers.

=== Tampa Bay Rays ===
In 2026, Higgins was named as pitching coach of the Charleston RiverDogs the Single-A affiliate of the Tampa Bay Rays.
