= Kota Futaki =

Japanese baseball player (born 1995)

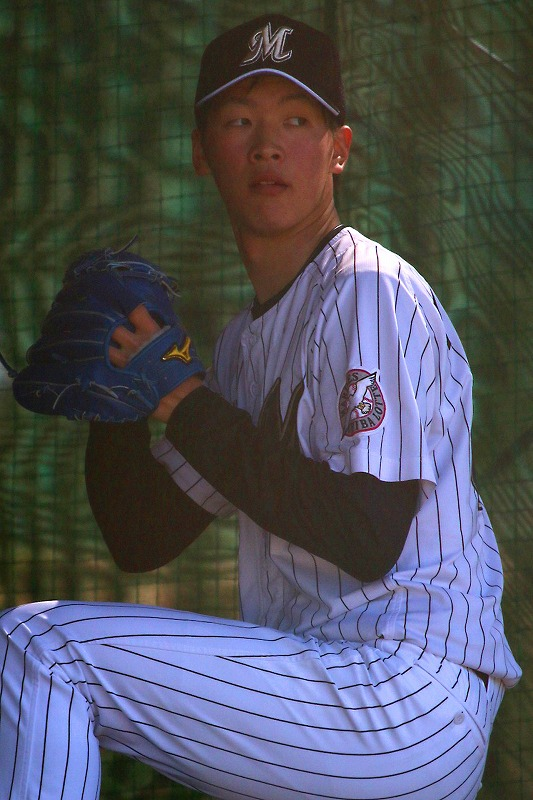
- Pitcher
- Born: August 1, 1995 (age 30)
- Batted: Right Threw: Right

NPB debut
- October 5, 2015, for the Chiba Lotte Marines

Last NPB appearance
- October 5, 2025, for the Chiba Lotte Marines

Career statistics
- Win–loss record: 41-50
- Earned run average: 4.18
- Strikeouts: 615
- Saves: 0
- Holds: 0
- Stats at Baseball Reference

Teams
- Chiba Lotte Marines (2015–2025)

Career highlights and awards
- NPB All-Star (2019)

Kota Futaki (二木 康太, born August 1, 1995) is a Japanese professional baseball pitcher for the Chiba Lotte Marines in Japan's Nippon Professional Baseball.
