= Nobuyoshi Yamada =

Japanese baseball player (born 1991)

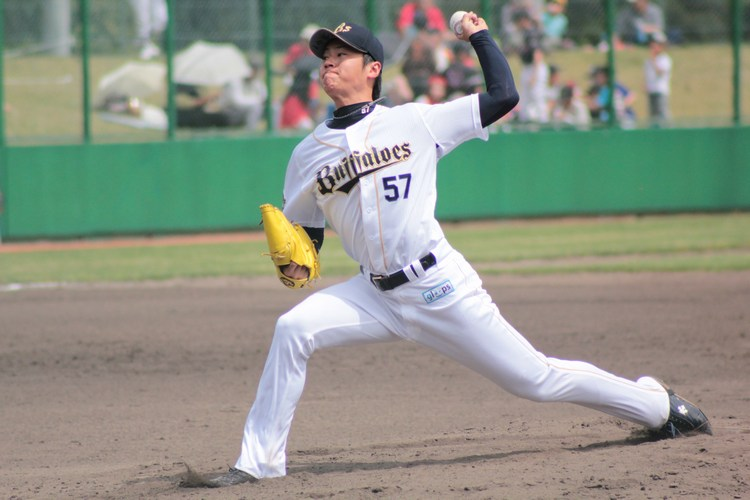

Orix Buffaloes – No. 57
- Pitcher
- Born: September 19, 1991 (age 34); Fukui, Fukui, Japan
- Bats: Left Throws: Left

NPB debut
- September 5, 2010, for the Orix Buffaloes

Career statistics (through 2024 season)
- Win–loss record: 12-22
- Earned run average: 3.75
- Strikeouts: 306
- Saves: 0
- Holds: 66
- Stats at Baseball Reference

Teams
- Orix Buffaloes (2010–present)

Nobuyoshi Yamada (山田 修義, Yamada Nobuyoshi; born September 19, 1991 in Fukui, Fukui, Japan) is a professional Japanese baseball player. He plays pitcher for the Orix Buffaloes.
