= Ryōsuke Moriwaki =

Japanese baseball player (born 1992)

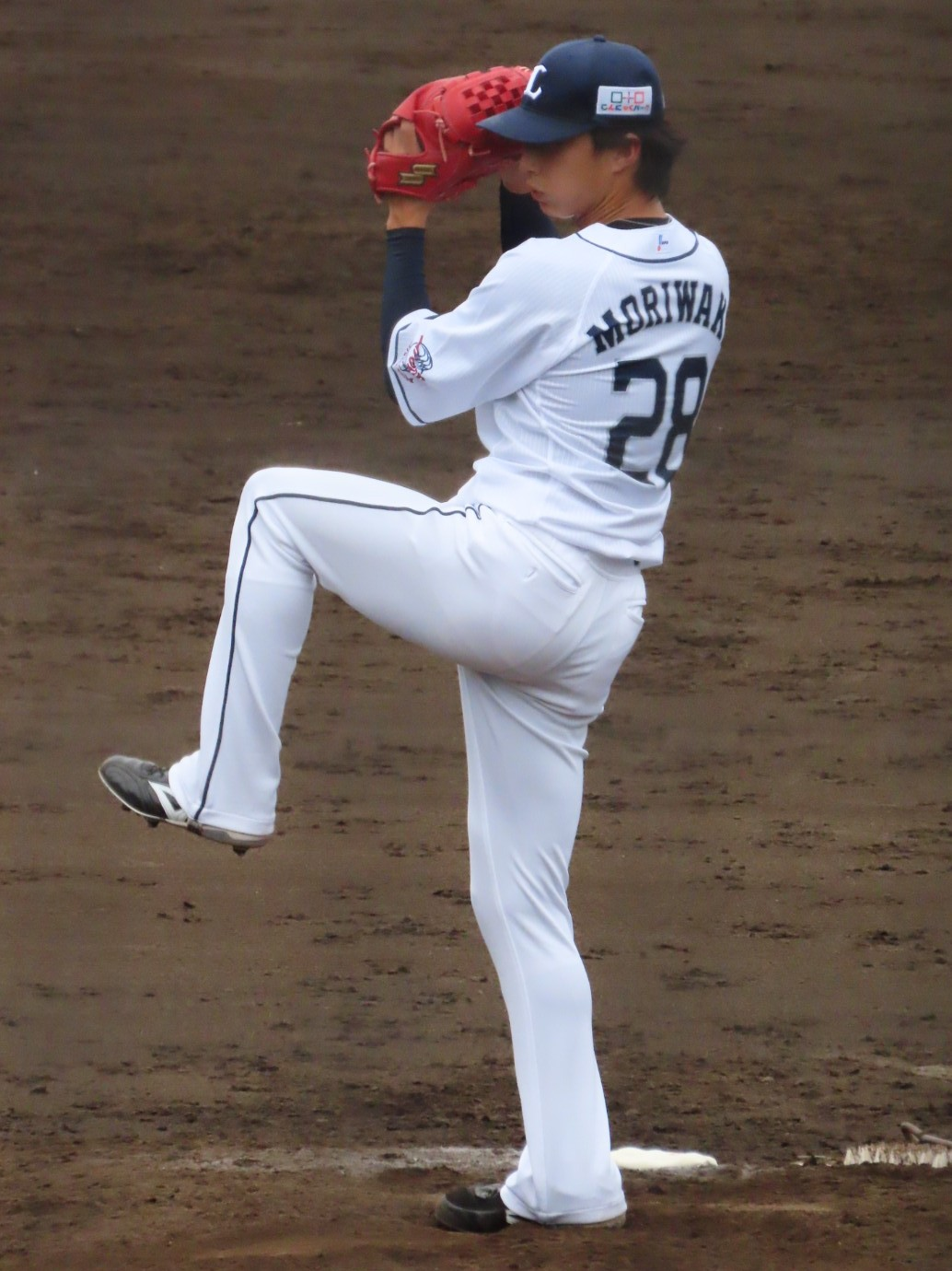

Saitama Seibu Lions – No. 127
- Pitcher
- Born: July 13, 1992 (age 33); Fukuchiyama, Kyoto, Japan
- Bats: Right Throws: Right

NPB debut
- May 6, 2019, for the Saitama Seibu Lions

Career statistics (through 2022 season)
- Win–loss record: 13-4
- Earned Run Average: 2.85
- Strikeouts: 127
- Saves: 3
- Holds: 41
- Stats at Baseball Reference

Teams
- Saitama Seibu Lions (2019–present)

Ryōsuke Moriwaki (森脇 亮介, Moriwaki Ryōsuke; born July 13, 1992 in Fukuchiyama, Kyoto, Japan) is a professional Japanese baseball player. He plays pitcher for the Saitama Seibu Lions.
