= Tatsuya Shiokawa =

Japanese baseball player (born 1983)

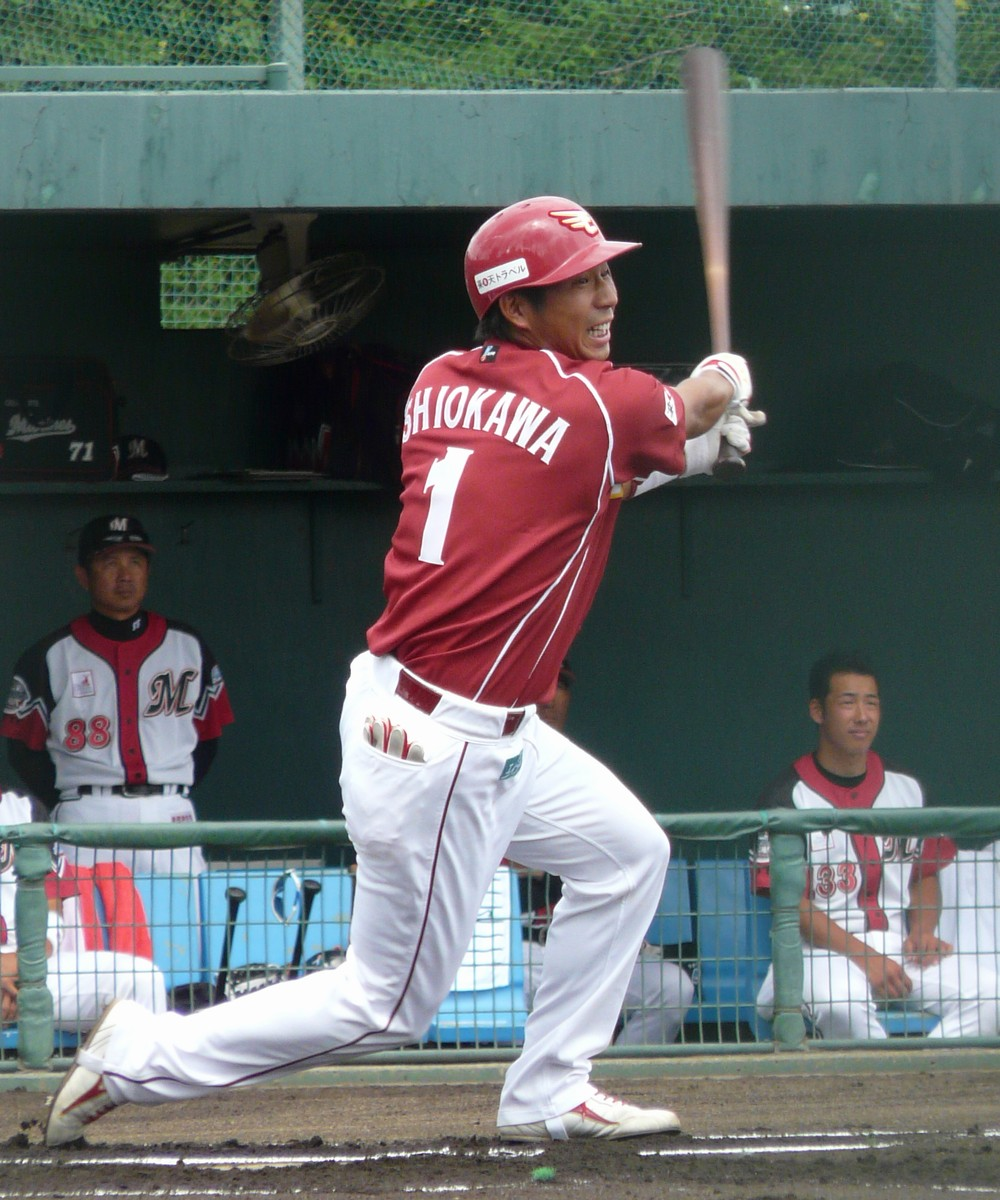

Tohoku Rakuten Golden Eagles – No. 86
- Infielder / Coach
- Born: March 15, 1983 (age 43); Kobe, Japan
- Batted: Switch Threw: Right

NPB debut
- June 1, 2006, for the Tohoku Rakuten Golden Eagles

Last appearance
- June 6, 2011, for the Tohoku Rakuten Golden Eagles

NPB statistics
- Batting average: .199
- Home runs: 1
- RBIs: 13
- Stolen Bases: 16
- Stats at Baseball Reference

Teams
- As player: Tohoku Rakuten Golden Eagles (2005–2011); As coach: Tohoku Rakuten Golden Eagles (2018–present)
- Last updated on: 24 June 2020

Tatsuya Shiokawa (塩川 達也, Shiokawa Tatsuya; born March 15, 1983 in Kobe, Japan) is a former Japanese Nippon Professional Baseball player. He is currently a coach for Tohoku Rakuten Golden Eagles in Japan's Pacific League.
