= Kōhei Morihara =

Japanese baseball player (born 1991)

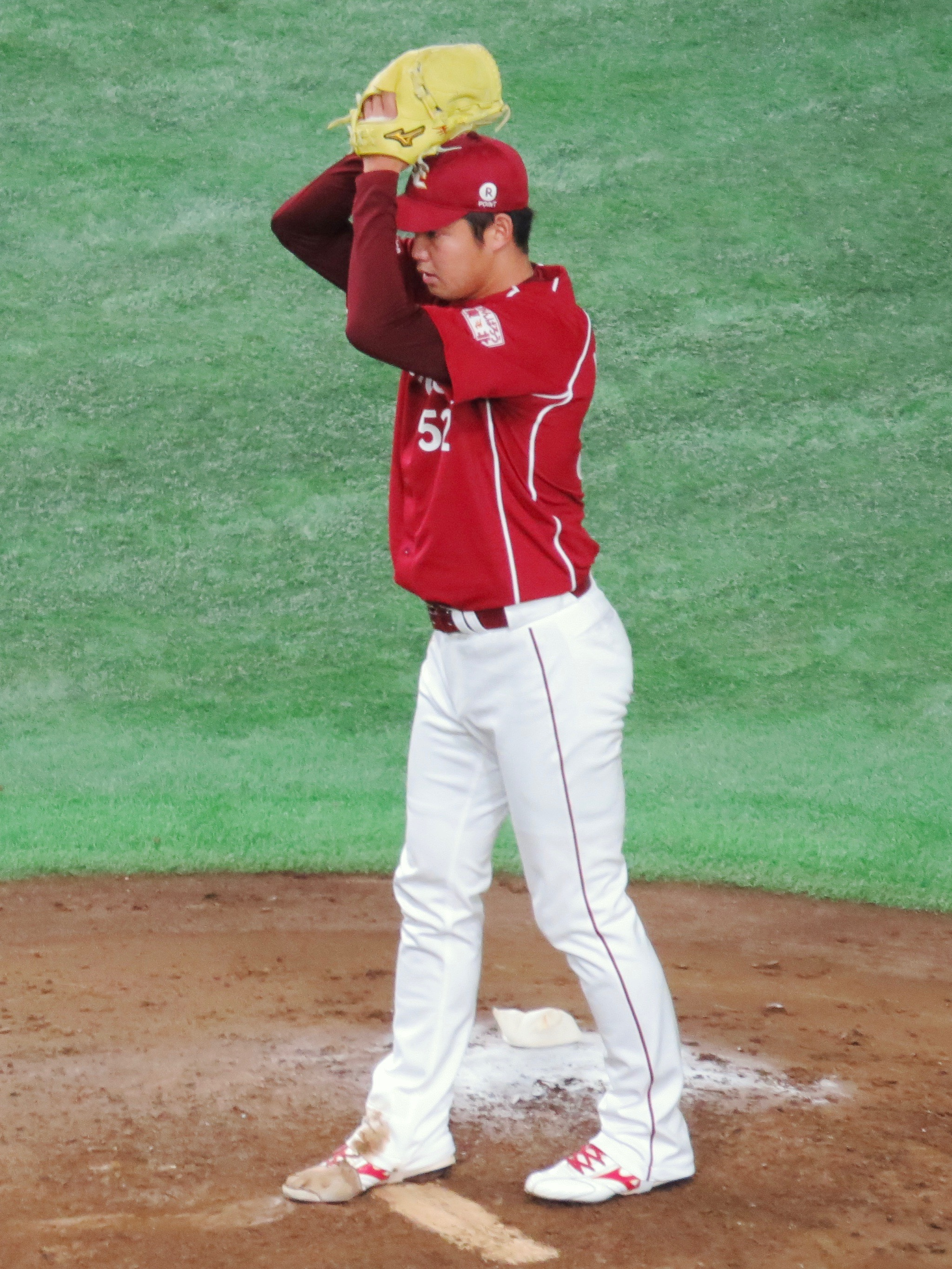

Yokohama DeNA BayStars – No. 45
- Pitcher
- Born: December 26, 1991 (age 34); Fukuyama, Hiroshima, Japan
- Bats: Left Throws: Right

NPB debut
- March 31, 2017, for the Tohoku Rakuten Golden Eagles

NPB statistics (through 2024 season)
- Win–loss record: 12-17
- Earned run average: 3.25
- Strikeouts: 253
- Saves: 50
- Holds: 70
- Stats at Baseball Reference

Teams
- Tohoku Rakuten Golden Eagles (2017–2022); Yokohama DeNA BayStars (2022–present)

Career highlights and awards
- Japan Series champion (2024); NPB All-Star (2024)

Kōhei Morihara (森原 康平, Morihara Kōhei; born December 26, 1991) is a Japanese professional baseball pitcher for the Yokohama DeNA BayStars of the Nippon Professional Baseball (NPB). He has previously played in NPB for the Tohoku Rakuten Golden Eagles.

== Career ==
=== Tohoku Rakuten Golden Eagles ===
Morihara began his career with the Tohoku Rakuten Golden Eagles, making his NPB debut on March 31, 2017. In his rookie campaign, he pitched to a 2–4 record and 4.81 ERA across 42 appearances. His numbers took a dip in 2018, regressing to a 5.82 ERA with 19 strikeouts across 17.0 innings pitched. Morihara made 64 appearances for the Eagles in 2019, posting the best season of his career. In 64.0 innings of work, he struck out 65 batters, while working to a 4–2 record and 1.97 ERA.

In the COVID-19-affected 2020 season, Morihara took a big step back, struggling to a 7.56 ERA with 14 strikeouts across 17 contests. He returned the next year to make 34 appearances, posting a tidy 2.78 ERA with 30 strikeouts in 32.1 innings pitched. In 2022, Morihara pitched in 3 games for the Eagles, allowing no runs in any of the games.

=== Yokohama DeNA BayStars ===
On July 26, 2022, Morihara was traded to the Yokohama DeNA BayStars in exchange for Yukiya Itoh. He made 6 appearances for Yokohama to close out the season, allowing 4 earned runs while striking out 8 in 6.0 innings pitched.

== International career ==
Morihara represented the Japan national baseball team in the 2019 exhibition games against Mexico.

On February 27, 2019, he was selected at the 2019 exhibition games against Mexico.

On October 1, 2019, he was selected at the 2019 WBSC Premier12. But, on October 21, he canceled due to right elbow discomfort.
