= Yuya Fukui =

Japanese baseball player (born 1988)

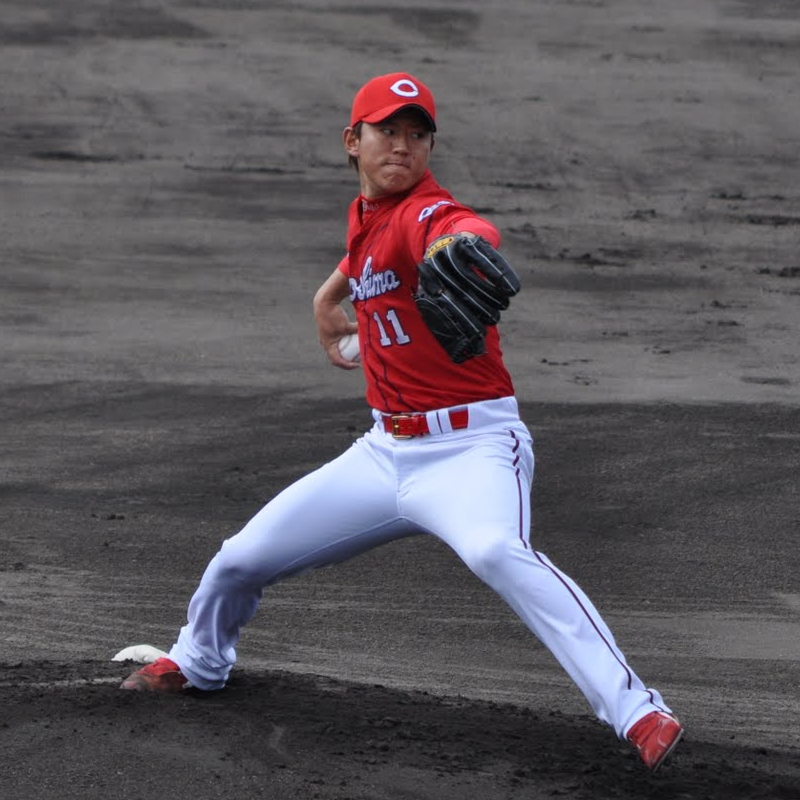
- Fukui with the Hiroshima Toyo Carp

Fukushima RedHopes – No. 11
- Pitcher
- Born: February 8, 1988 (age 37); Aida District, Okayama, Japan
- Bats: Right Throws: Right

debut
- April 17, 2011, for the Hiroshima Toyo Carp

NPB statistics (through 2020 season)
- Win–loss record: 32-41
- Earned run average: 4.59
- Strikeouts: 451

Teams
- Hiroshima Toyo Carp (2011–2018); Tohoku Rakuten Golden Eagles (2019–2022)

Yuya Fukui (福井 優也, Fukui Yuya; born February 8, 1988 in Aida District, Okayama, Japan) is a former professional Japanese baseball player.
