= Ko Shimozuru =

Japanese baseball player (born 1988)

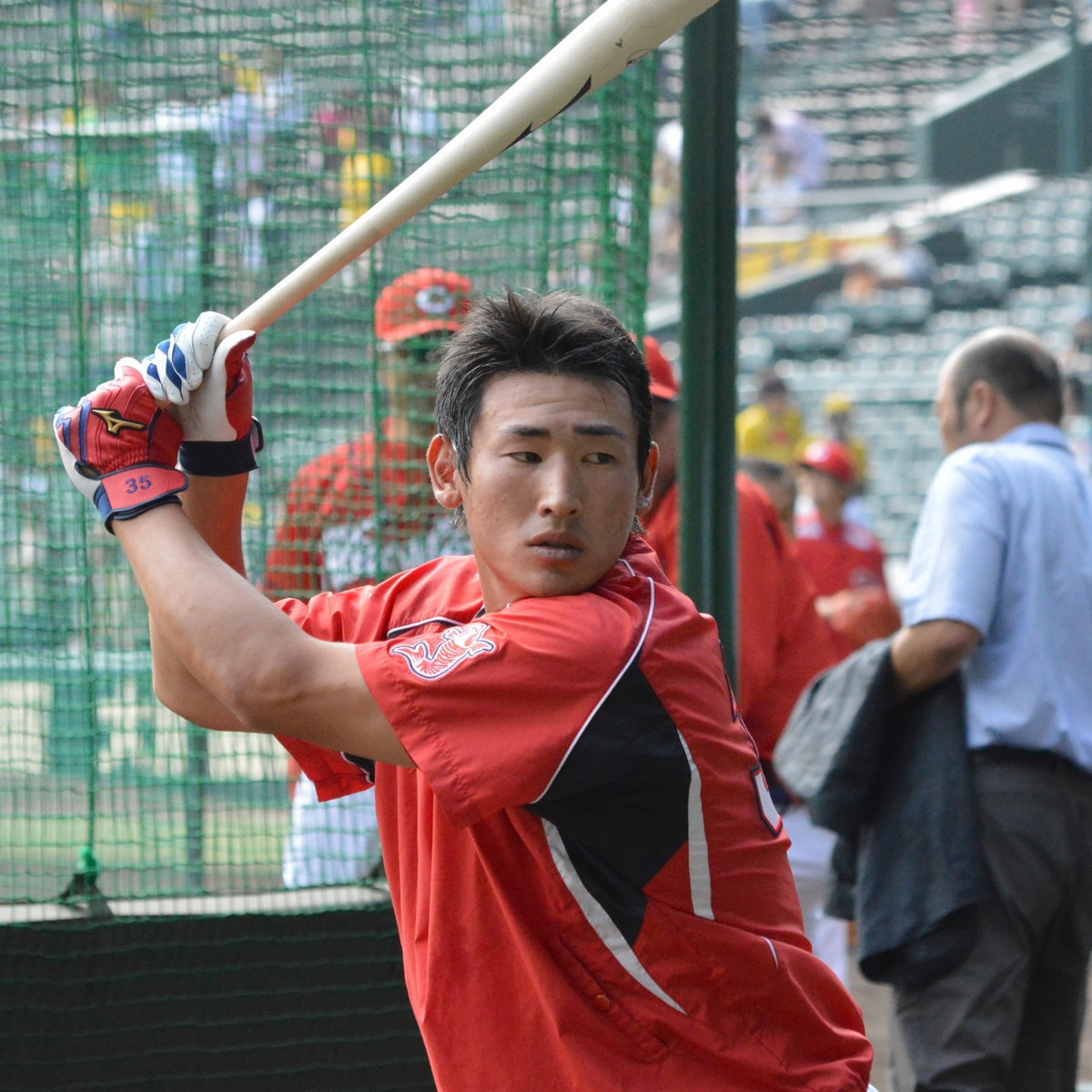
- Outfielder
- Born: April 23, 1988 (age 37); Yokohama, Kanagawa, Japan
- Batted: Right Threw: Right

NPB debut
- October 3, 2013, for the Hiroshima Toyo Carp

Last NPB appearance
- Jule 7, 2021, for the Tohoku Rakuten Golden Eagles

Career statistics (through 2021 season)
- RBI: 42
- Home runs: 12
- Batting average: .237

Teams
- Hiroshima Toyo Carp (2013–2019); Tohoku Rakuten Golden Eagles (2019–2021)

Ko Shimozuru (下水流 昂, Shimozuru Ko; born April 23, 1988) is a former professional Japanese baseball player. He was an outfielder for the Hiroshima Toyo Carp and Tohoku Rakuten Golden Eagles of the Nippon Professional Baseball (NPB).

== Early Baseball Career ==
Shimozuru was born in Aoba-ku, Yokohama, Kanagawa Prefecture. He attended Kamoshida Elementary School and Kamoshida Junior High School. He started baseball when he was in elementary school and played in the Midori Chuo Little Senior when he was in junior high school. He attended Yokohama High School, one of the country's best high school baseball team and became the cleanup hitter in his second year of high school. His team managed to win the championship in the 78th National School High School Invitation Tournament in the Spring of 2006. His team also made it to the Japanese High School Baseball Championship in the Summer of 2006, but was lost 6–11 to Osaka Toin High School in the first round. He played in the same team with Nobumasa Fukuda (now player for Chunichi Dragons) from elementary school to high school.

After graduating high school, he enrolled in Aoyama Gakuin University and played as a regular in the Tohto University Baseball League since his freshman year. In his junior year, his posterior cruciate ligament was injured and his team dropped to Division Two of the League in the same year. He became the captain of the team in his senior year and led the team back to Division One. He was named the League Best Nine in the spring season of his sophomore year and fall season of his senior year. He batted 13 home runs in his university career, 9 in Division 1 and 4 in Division 2.

He played for Honda's baseball team as an outfielder after graduating from university. He worked at Honda's car manufacturing factory and was responsible for inspecting engines.

== Professional career ==
He was selected as Hiroshima Toyo Carp's 4th pick in the 2012 Nippon Professional Baseball draft.

2013

He started with the farm team in the spring camp but was promoted to ichigun (Japanese equivalent of the major league). However, he got his adductor muscle injured in March and spent most of his season with the farm team. He was promoted to the ichigun again on October 3, when there were two games left for the season. He made his NPB debut on the same day as a starter and got his first career hit. In the last game of the season on October 6, he recorded his first career RBI as a pinch hitter. He also appeared as a pinch hitter in the first game of the Climax Series first stage against the Hanshin Tigers.

2014

2015

2016

He was on the 2016 Opening Day roster and had six plate appearances in the first four games of the season, but was struck out four times and had no hits. He was promoted to ichigun again on June 10 and hit his first career home run on June 19.

2019

He was traded to the Tohoku Rakuten Golden Eagles on 2 July.

2021

Shimozuru was released by the Tohoku Rakuten Golden Eagles on 26 Oct and announced his retirement from NPB on 18 December.
