= Alan Busenitz =

American baseball player (born 1990)

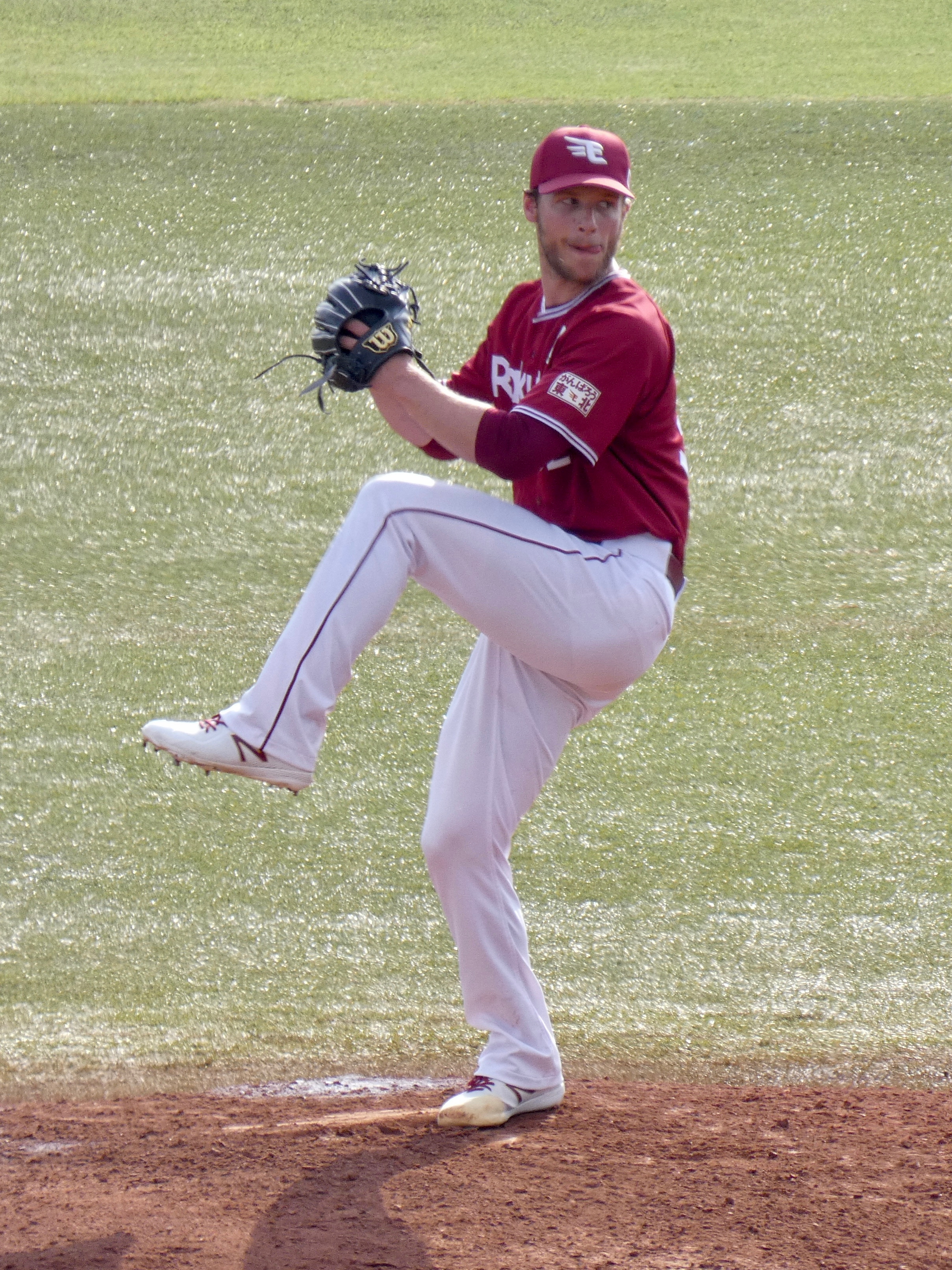
- Busenitz with the Tohoku Rakuten Golden Eagles

Free agent
- Pitcher
- Born: August 22, 1990 (age 36); Watkinsville, Georgia, U.S.
- Bats: Right Throws: Right

Professional debut
- MLB: June 17, 2017, for the Minnesota Twins
- NPB: May 15, 2019, for the Tohoku Rakuten Golden Eagles

MLB statistics (through 2024 season)
- Win–loss record: 5–2
- Earned run average: 4.90
- Strikeouts: 57

NPB statistics (through 2022 season)
- Win–loss record: 9-8
- Earned run average: 2.83
- Strikeouts: 125
- Saves: 18
- Stats at Baseball Reference

Teams
- Minnesota Twins (2017–2018); Tohoku Rakuten Golden Eagles (2019–2022); Cincinnati Reds (2023–2024)

Alan Paul Busenitz (born August 22, 1990) is an American professional baseball pitcher who is a free agent. He has previously played in Major League Baseball (MLB) for the Minnesota Twins and Cincinnati Reds, and in Nippon Professional Baseball (NPB) for the Tohoku Rakuten Golden Eagles.

== Career ==
=== Los Angeles Angels ===
Busenitz attended Athens Christian School in Athens, Georgia, and Kennesaw State University, where he played college baseball for the Kennesaw State Owls. The Los Angeles Angels selected him in the 25th round of the 2013 Major League Baseball draft. He made his professional debut with the rookie ball Orem Owlz, logging a 5–2 record and 2.33 ERA in 21 appearances. The next year, Busenitz played for the Single-A Burlington Bees, pitching to a 4–5 record and 1.94 ERA in 49 games. In 2015, the Angels tried to use Busenitz as a starting pitcher with the Double-A Arkansas Travelers, but returned to using him as a relief pitcher with the High-A Inland Empire 66ers after he struggled to a 6.75 ERA in 16 contests. In 2016, the Angels promoted Busenitz to the Salt Lake Bees of the Triple–A Pacific Coast League. In 10 games for Salt Lake, Busenitz struggled to a 7.62 ERA, and also logged a 1.93 ERA in 24 appearances for Arkansas.

=== Minnesota Twins ===
On August 1, 2016, The Angels traded Busenitz to the Minnesota Twins alongside Hector Santiago in exchange for Alex Meyer and Ricky Nolasco. Busenitz finished the year with the Rochester Red Wings of the Triple-A International League and the Double-A Chattanooga Lookouts, posting a 2–0 record with 10 strikeouts.

Busenitz began the 2017 season with Rochester, and pitched to a 1.25 earned run average in his first 29 1/3 innings pitched of the season. On June 17, 2017, he was selected to the 40-man roster and promoted to the major leagues for the first time. He made his MLB debut that day, pitching 2.0 innings of 1-run ball against the Cleveland Indians. He finished his rookie season with a neat 1.99 ERA in 31.2 innings pitched across 28 contests. In 2018, Busenitz could not replicate his success from the previous year, struggling to a 4–1 record and 7.82 ERA in 23 major league appearances. He was granted his unconditional release on November 20, 2018, so he could sign with a team in Nippon Professional Baseball.

=== Tohoku Rakuten Golden Eagles ===
On November 20, 2018, Busenitz signed with the Tohoku Rakuten Golden Eagles of Japan's Nippon Professional Baseball (NPB). In his first NPB season, Busenitz logged a 4–3 record and stellar 1.94 ERA in 54 appearances for Rakuten. On December 3, 2019, Busenitz signed a 1-year extension to remain with the Eagles. By 2022, Busenitz had pitched in 165 games for the Eagles, recording a 9–8 record and 2.83 ERA in 155 2/3 innings pitched.

=== Cincinnati Reds ===
On December 27, 2022, Busenitz signed a minor league contract with an invitation to spring training with the Cincinnati Reds. He was assigned to the Triple-A Louisville Bats to begin the 2023 season, where he recorded a 1.80 ERA with 13 strikeouts and 3 saves across 15 appearances. On May 14, 2023, Busenitz's contract was selected to the active roster. In 5 games for Cincinnati, he registered a 3.60 ERA with 3 strikeouts in 5 innings of work. On September 1, Busenitz was designated for assignment. He cleared waivers and was sent outright to Triple–A Louisville on September 4. On October 1, the Reds selected Busenitz back to the major league roster. He struck out two in two perfect innings against the St. Louis Cardinals in Cincinnati's final game of the year. On October 9, Busenitz was removed from the 40–man roster and sent outright to Triple–A Louisville. He elected free agency on October 12.

On January 3, 2024, Busenitz re–signed with the Reds organization on a minor league contract. In 40 games for Louisville, he compiled a 5–2 record and 3.93 ERA with 51 strikeouts over 55 innings pitched. On August 23, the Reds selected Busenitz's contract, adding him to their active roster. He allowed 4 runs (3 earned) in one inning pitched and was designated for assignment the following day. Busenitz cleared waivers and was sent outright to Louisville on August 29. On September 20, Busenitz was added back to the major league roster. After two more outings, he was designated for assignment on September 22. Busenitz cleared waivers and was sent outright to Louisville on September 24.

On October 28, 2024, Busenitz re-signed with the Reds organization on a minor league contract. He made 18 appearances for Louisville in 2025, but struggled to a 2-3 record and 6.75 ERA with 21 strikeouts and one save across 25 1/3 innings pitched. Busenitz elected free agency following the season on November 6, 2025.
