= Tatsushi Masuda =

Japanese baseball player

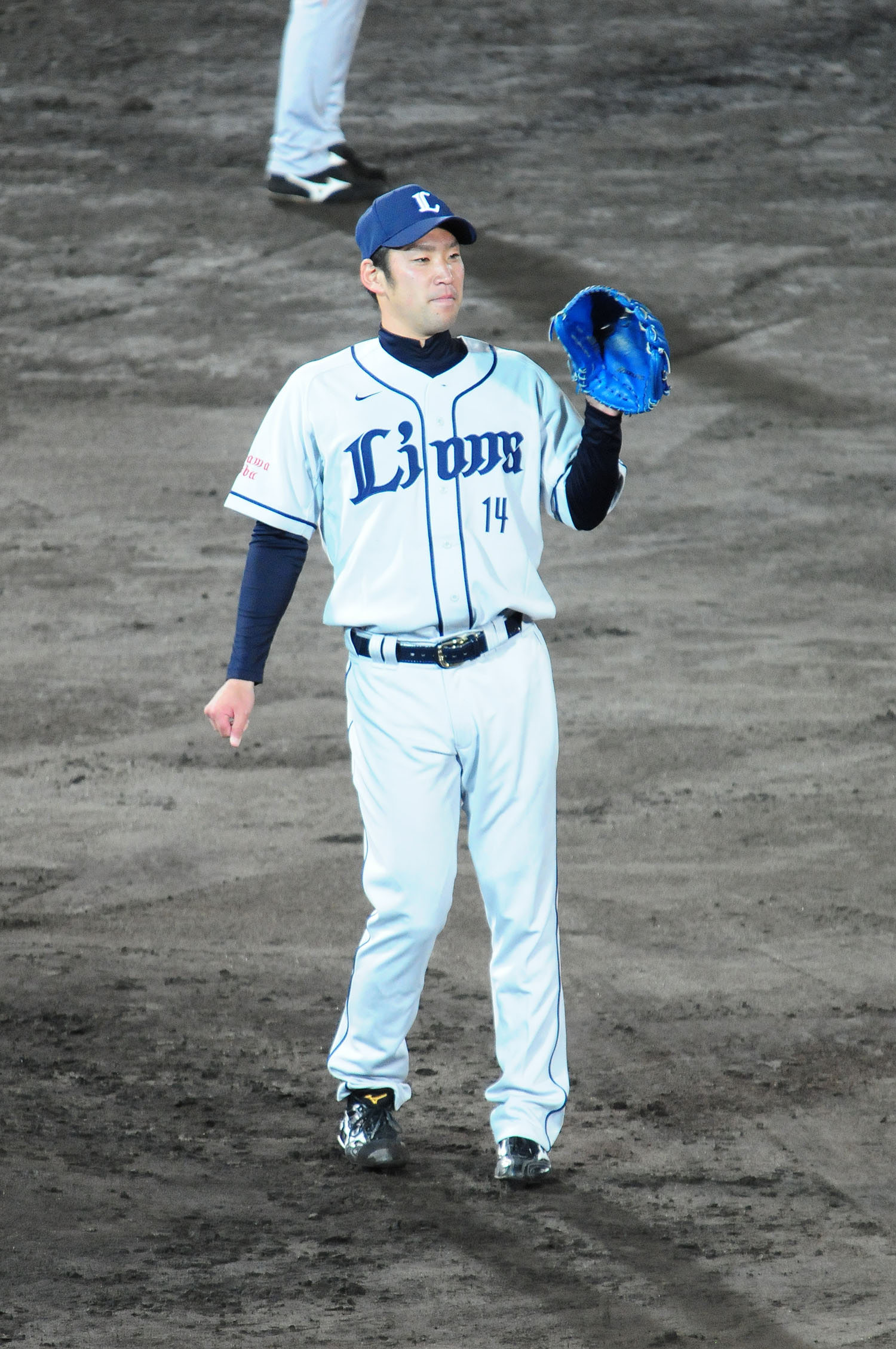
- Masuda with the Saitama Seibu Lions
- Pitcher
- Born: April 23, 1988 (age 37); Sumoto, Hyōgo, Japan
- Batted: Right Threw: Right

debut
- June 13, 2013, for the Saitama Seibu Lions

Last appearance
- September 28, 2024, for the Saitama Seibu Lions

NPB statistics
- Win–loss record: 31-40
- Earned run average: 3.03
- Strikeouts: 482
- Saves: 194
- Holds: 109
- Stats at Baseball Reference

Teams
- Saitama Seibu Lions (2013–2024)

Career highlights and awards
- 3× NPB All-Star (2015, 2019, 2022); Pacific League Most Valuable Setup Pitcher (2015); 1× Best Battery Award with Catcher Tomoya Mori (2019); Pacific League saves leader (2020)

Tatsushi Masuda (増田 達至, Masuda Tatsushi; born April 23, 1988 in Hyōgo, Hyōgo, Japan) is a former Japanese professional baseball pitcher. He previous plays for the Saitama Seibu Lions of Nippon Professional Baseball (NPB).
