= Geronimo Franzua =

Dominican baseball player (born 1993)

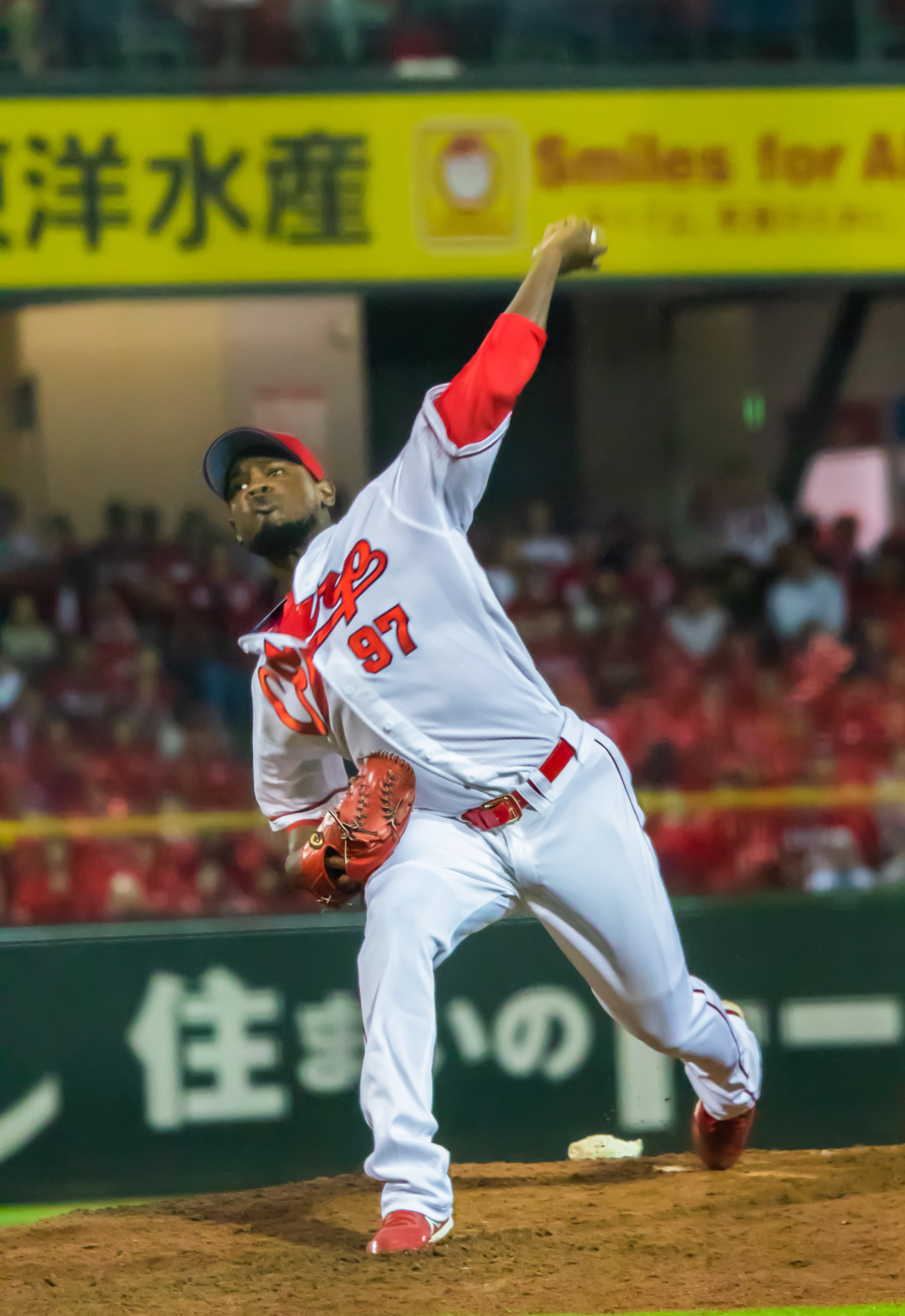
- Franzua with the Hiroshima Toyo Carp

Free agent
- Pitcher
- Born: September 25, 1993 (age 32); La Romana, Dominican Republic
- Bats: Left Throws: Left

NPB debut
- May 26, 2018, for the Hiroshima Toyo Carp

NPB statistics (through 2022 season)
- Win–loss record: 14–15
- Earned run average: 2.60
- Strikeouts: 246

Teams
- Hiroshima Toyo Carp (2018–2022)

Career highlights and awards
- NPB All-Star (2019)

Geronimo Franzua (born September 25, 1993) is a Dominican Republic professional baseball pitcher who is a free agent. He has previously played in Nippon Professional Baseball (NPB) for the Hiroshima Toyo Carp.

== Playing career ==
=== Houston Astros ===
Franzua was signed by the Houston Astros on September 23, 2010. He was a member of the Dominican Summer League Astros for three years from 2011 to 2013. Franzua was released by the Astros organization on January 7, 2014.

=== Hiroshima Toyo Carp ===
Franzua joined the Dominican Carp Academy in 2014. He came to Japan as a trainee in September 2014, and was sent to the Kōchi Fighting Dogs of the Shikoku Island League Plus in March 2016. He pitched in 14 games that season, posting a 1-5 record and a 4.43 earned-run average.

On March 7, 2018, Franzua signed a developmental player contract with the Hiroshima Toyo Carp, and was assigned uniform number 143. He began the season with eight appearances in the Western League, posting a 2-1 record and a 2.57 earned-run average, then signed a controlled player contract with the team on May 20. The contract contained a $100,000 (11,042,318 yen) signing bonus and an annual salary of $80,000 (8,833,854 yen). His uniform number was changed to 97. He recorded his first professional win on June 26 against the Yomiuri Giants, and in August, he had a 0.51 earned-run average in 18 appearances. He also pitched in the 2018 Central League Climax Series and the 2018 Japan Series, ultimately ending his season with a 1.66 ERA with 81 strikeouts in 47 games. Franzua pitched in 67 contests for the Carp in 2019, compiling an 8-6 record and 2.76 ERA with 94 strikeouts and 12 saves across 83 2/3 innings pitched.

Franzua made 53 appearances for the Carp during the 2020 campaign, posting a 2-3 record and 2.45 ERA with 62 strikeouts and 19 saves across 55 innings pitched. In 2021, he made only 8 appearances for the main team, and struggled to a 1-2 record and 9.53 ERA with 5 strikeouts across 5 2/3 innings pitched. Franzua pitched in 3 game for Hiroshima in 2022, and again struggled to an 8.10 ERA with 4 strikeouts across 3 1/3 innings pitched. He became a free agent following the season.

=== Pittsburgh Pirates ===
On February 10, 2023, Franzua signed a minor league contract with the Pittsburgh Pirates. He split the year between the rookie-level Florida Complex League Pirates, Single-A Bradenton Marauders, and Double-A Altoona Curve, accumulating a combined 4-3 record and 6.54 ERA with 35 strikeouts across 27 appearances.

Franzua spent 2024 with the Triple-A Indianapolis Indians, registering a 5-6 record and 4.55 ERA with 80 strikeouts and 5 saves in 61 1/3 innings pitched across 48 games. Franzua elected free agency following the season on November 4, 2024.

=== Sultanes de Monterrey ===
On February 25, 2025, Franzua signed with the Diablos Rojos del México of the Mexican League. On April 15, Franzua was traded to the Sultanes de Monterrey. In 41 relief appearances, he posted a 2–0 record with a stellar 0.95 ERA and 29 strikeouts across 38 innings pitched.

Franzua made 34 relief appearances for the Sultanes in 2026, compiling a 4–0 record with a 4.88 ERA and 24 strikeouts across 27 2/3 innings of work. On July 17, 2026, Franzua was released by Monterrey.
