= Fumikazu Kimura =

Japanese baseball player (born 1988)

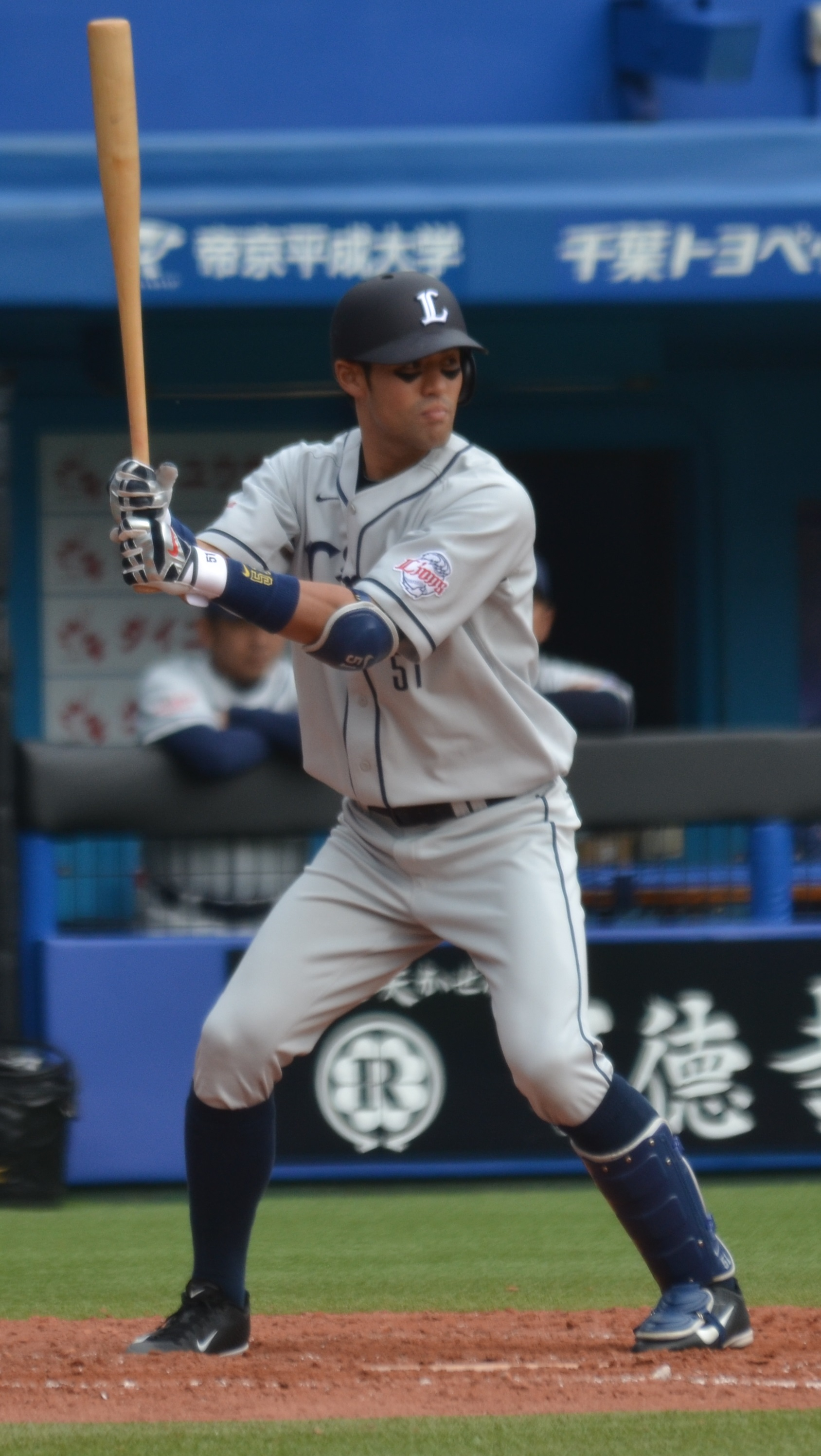
- Kimura with the Saitama Seibu Lions

Saitama Seibu Lions – No. 89
- Outfielder / Coach
- Born: September 13, 1988 (age 38); Ōta, Tokyo, Japan
- Batted: Right Threw: Right

NPB debut
- August 31, 2007, for the Seibu Lions

Last NPB appearance
- September 20, 2023, for the Hokkaido Nippon-Ham Fighters

NPB statistics
- Batting average: .213
- Hits: 326
- Home runs: 42
- RBI: 154
- Stats at Baseball Reference

Teams
- As player: Seibu Lions/Saitama Seibu Lions (2007–2021); Hokkaido Nippon-Ham Fighters (2021–2023); As coach: Saitama Seibu Lions (2025–present)

Fumikazu Kimura (木村 文紀, Kimura Fumikazu; born September 13, 1988 in Ōta, Tokyo, Japan) is a Japanese former professional baseball outfielder. He played in Nippon Professional Baseball (NPB) for the Saitama Seibu Lions and Hokkaido Nippon-Ham Fighters.

== Professional career ==
=== Saitama Seibu Lions ===
On November 21, 2006, Kimura was drafted by the Seibu Lions first overall pick high school draft in the 2006 Nippon Professional Baseball draft.

On August 31, 2007, he made his debut as a relief pitcher in the Pacific League against the Tohoku Rakuten Golden Eagles.

In the match against the Orix Buffaloes on July 31, 2011, Kimura pitched as a relief pitcher and earned his first win.

From 2007 to 2012 season, he pitched 41 games in the Pacific League.

In 2013, Kimura converted from pitcher to an outfielder. On May 23, he recorded his first hit. And he recorded his first home run and RBI against the Yokohama DeNA BayStars in the Interleague play on May 28. He played in 11 games in the Pacific League.

In the 2014 season, Kimura finished the regular season in 100 games with a batting average of .215, 10 home runs, 27 RBI, and 16 stolen bases.

In 2015, he finished the regular season in 49 games with a batting average of .195, 5 home runs, 12 RBI, and a stolen bases.

In the 2016 season, he played only 28 games in the Pacific League.

In 2017, Kimura finished the regular season in 105 games with a batting average of .201, 2 home runs, 13 RBI, and 7 stolen bases. In the 2018 season, he finished the regular season in 75 games with a batting average of .260, 3 home runs, 12 RBI, and 7 stolen bases. In 2019, he played in 130 regular season games with a batting average of .220, 10 home runs, 38 RBI, and 16 stolen bases. In the 2020 season, he finished the regular season in 90 games with a batting average of .231, 8 home runs, 33 RBI, and 5 stolen bases.

=== Hokkaido Nippon-Ham Fighters ===
On August 12, 2021, Kimura and Ryusei Satoh was traded to the Hokkaido Nippon-Ham Fighters in exchange for Katsuhiko Kumon and Shota Hiranuma.

On September 20, 2023, Kimura announced his retirement and played in his final game against the Lions, his former team.
