= Mitsuo Yoshikawa =

Japanese baseball player (born 1988)

Mitsuo Yoshikawa 吉川 光夫
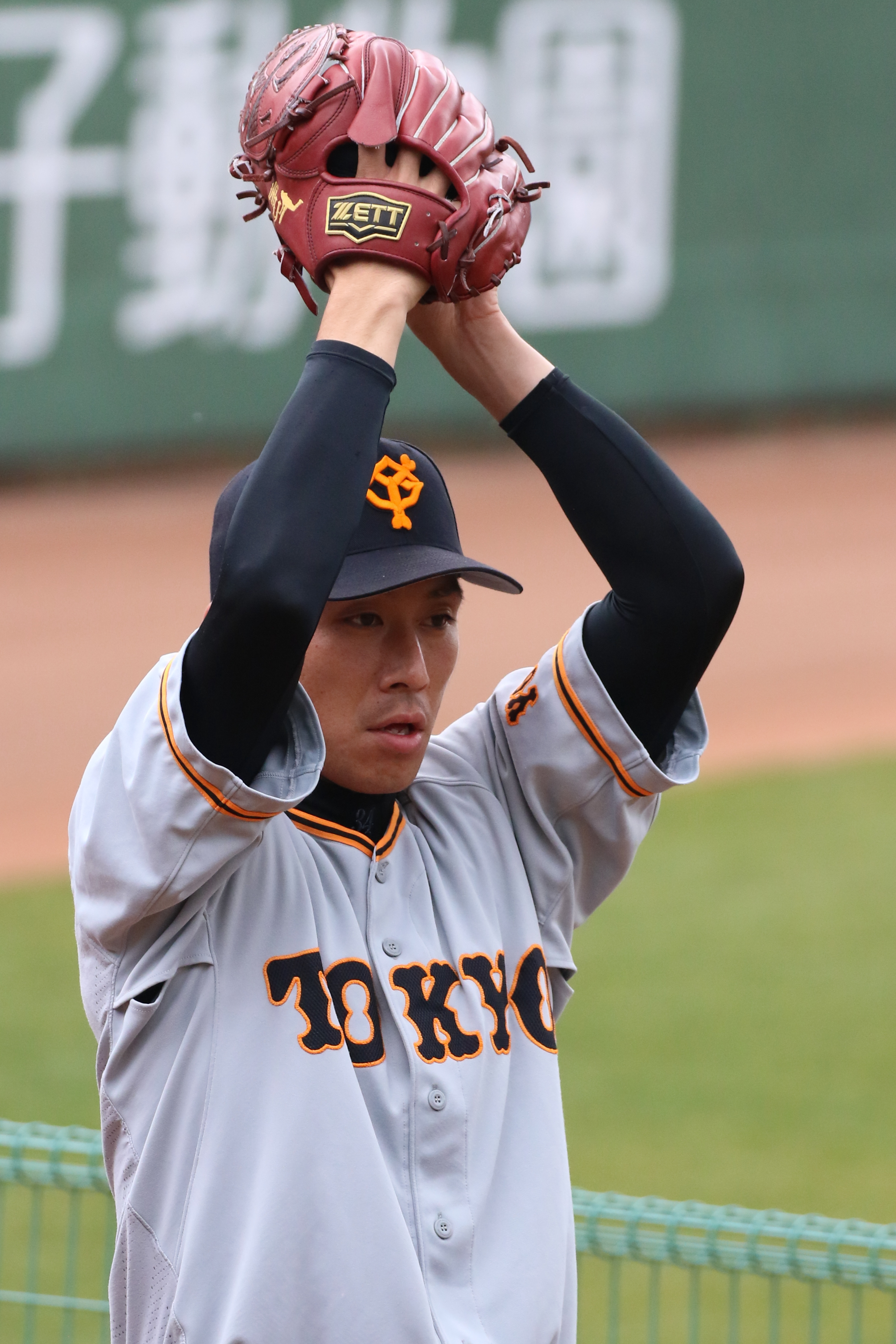
- Yoshikawa with the Yomiuri Giants

Tochigi Golden Braves – No. 18
- Pitcher / Coach
- Born: April 6, 1988 (age 38); Fukuoka, Fukuoka Japan
- Bats: Left Throws: Left

debut
- May 17, 2007, for the Hokkaido Nippon-Ham Fighters

NPB statistics (through 2020 season)
- Win–loss record: 55–70
- Innings Pitched: 1045.1
- ERA: 3.91
- Strikeouts: 745
- Stats at Baseball Reference

Teams
- As player: Hokkaido Nippon-Ham Fighters (2007–2016, 2019–2020); Yomiuri Giants (2017–2019); Saitama Seibu Lions (2021); Tochigi Golden Braves (2022–present); As coach: Tochigi Golden Braves (2022–present)

Career highlights and awards
- 2× NPB All-Star (2012–2013); Pacific League MVP 2012; 1× Best Nine Award 2012; PL MVP 2012; PL ERA title 2012

Mitsuo Yoshikawa (吉川 光夫, born April 6, 1988) is a Japanese professional baseball player. A pitcher, he plays for the Hokkaido Nippon Ham Fighters of Nippon Professional Baseball (NPB). He previously played for the Yomiuri Giants of Nippon Professional Baseball (NPB).

== Career ==
=== Hokkaido Nippon Ham Fighters ===
Yoshikawa was a first-round pick of the Hokkaido Nippon-Ham Fighters out of high school. He went 4-3 with a 3.66 ERA in 2007, with 46 walks in 93 1/3 innings. In the 2007 Japan Series, the 19-year-old relieved Ryan Glynn in game two but walked two batters following three free passes issued by Glynn to set a Japan Series record for one team in one inning. Two games later, manager Trey Hillman gave Yoshikawa the ball, only the 5th rookie out of high school to start a Japan Series game and the first since Kazuhisa Ishii. Yoshikawa again struggled with his control, taking the loss to the Chunichi Dragons (who would win the Series). Overall, he allowed seven walks, three hits and three runs (two earned) in six innings in the Series.

The Fukuoka native fell to 2-4, 6.23 in his seven starts in 2008, walking 22 in 34 2/3 innings. #34 was 0-2 with a 6.61 ERA and 10 walks in 16 1/3 innings in 2009 and 0-4 with a 6.92 ERA and .330 opponent average in 2010. He was 0-5 with a 4.74 ERA in 2011 to bring his career record to 6-18.

He then turned things around in a big way in 2012, going 14-5 with a 1.71 ERA. He was among the Pacific League leaders in wins (2nd, 3 behind Tadashi Settsu), ERA (1st by .16 over Masahiro Tanaka), complete games (tied for 3rd with 5, even with Yoshihisa Naruse and Hiroshi Kisanuki), shutouts (3, tied for first with Kenji Otonari and Tanaka), innings (173 2/3, 7th, between Otonari and Tanaka), walks (45, 6th between Otonari and Ishii), strikeouts (158, 2nd, 11 behind Tanaka) and WHIP (0.88, 1st, .08 ahead of runner-up Takayuki Kishi). In the 2012 Japan Series, he did not fare as well, giving up 9 runs on 13 hits in 6 2/3 IP and losing games 1 and 5 as the Fighters fell to the Yomiuri Giants. He did win the Best Nine Award as the PL's top pitcher and also easily took home the 2012 Pacific League Most Valuable Player Award, with 181 first-place votes out of 210. He lost out the Sawamura Award to Settsu, who was a distant second place in the MVP voting.

=== Yomiuri Giants ===
On 2 November 2016, it was revealed that Yoshikawa had been included in a trade with the Yomiuri Giants with Shingo Ishikawa for Giants outfielder Taishi Ota and Katsuhiko Kumon.

=== Return to the Fighters ===
On June 26, 2019, Yoshikawa and teammate, catcher Shingo Usami were traded to the Fighters for pitchers, Yohei Kagiya and Takahiro Fujioka.

== Pitching Style ==
With an overhand delivery Yoshikawa throws a fastball (tops out at 94 mph), slider, changeup, and curveball.
