= Taishi Ohta =

Japanese baseball player (born 1990)

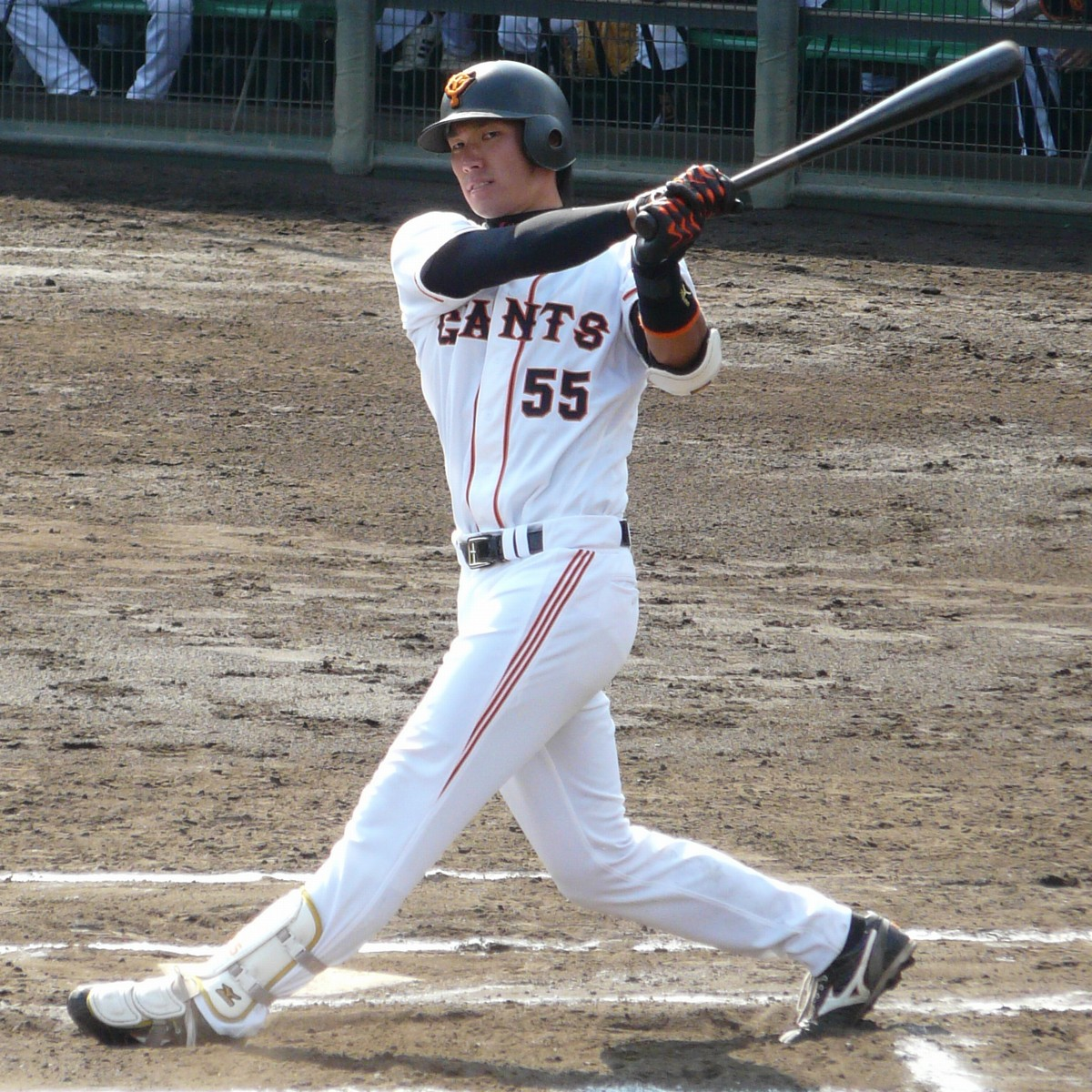
- Ohta with the Yomiuri Giants

Yomiuri Giants
- Outfielder / Coach
- Born: June 9, 1990 (age 36); Miyoshi, Hiroshima, Japan
- Batted: Right Threw: Right

NPB debut
- June 21, 2009, for the Yomiuri Giants

Last NPB appearance
- October 4, 2014, for the Yokohama DeNA BayStars

NPB statistics
- Batting average: .259
- Hits: 718
- Home runs: 84
- Runs batted in: 343
- Stolen bases: 29
- Stats at Baseball Reference

Teams
- As player: Yomiuri Giants (2009–2016); Hokkaido Nippon-Ham Fighters (2017–2021); Yokohama DeNA BayStars (2022–2024); As coach: Yomiuri Giants (2026–present)

Career highlights and awards
- NPB All-Star (2018); Mitsui Golden Glove Award (2020)

Taishi Ohta (大田 泰示, Ohta Taishi; born June 9, 1990) is a Japanese professional baseball outfielder for the Yokohama DeNA BayStars in Japan's Nippon Professional Baseball.

== Professional career ==
=== Hokkaido Nippon-Ham Fighters ===
On 2 November 2016, it was revealed that Ohta had been included in a trade with the Hokkaido Nippon-Ham Fighters with teammate Katsuhiko Kumon for Fighters pitcher Mitsuo Yoshikawa and Shingo Ishikawa.

He selected 2018 NPB All-Star game. Ohta became a free agent following the 2021 season.

On December 20, 2021, Ohta signed with the Yokohama DeNA BayStars of Nippon Professional Baseball.
