= Katsuhiko Kumon =

Japanese baseball player (born 1992)

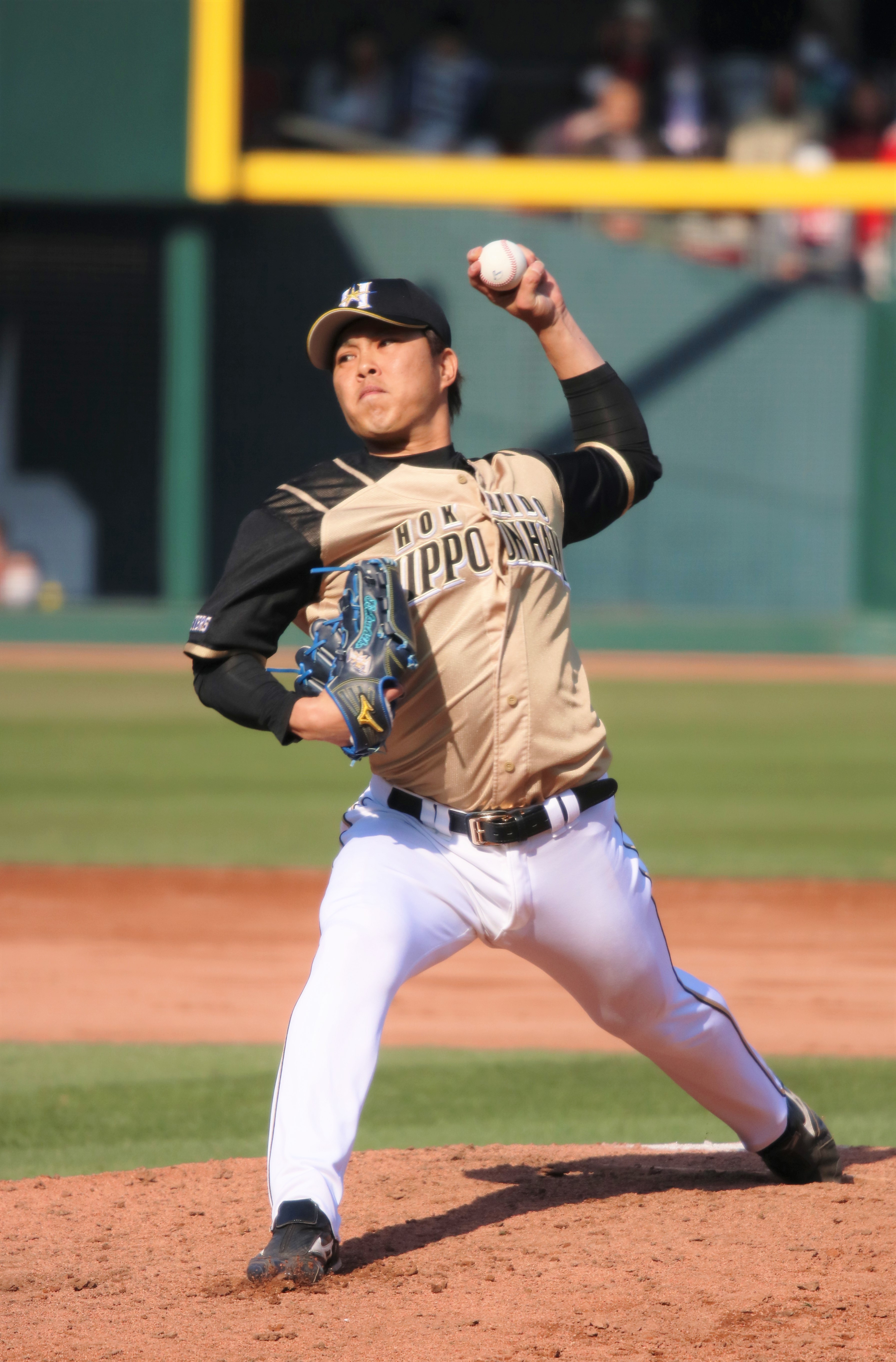
- Kumon with the Hokkaido Nippon-Ham Fighters
- Pitcher
- Born: March 4, 1992 (age 34); Aki District, Kōchi, Japan
- Batted: Left Threw: Left

NPB debut
- September 25, 2013, for the Yomiuri Giants

Last NPB appearance
- September 12, 2023, for the Saitama Seibu Lions

NPB statistics
- Win–loss: 8–3
- Earned run average: 3.45
- Strikeouts: 174
- Stats at Baseball Reference

Teams
- Yomiuri Giants (2013–2016); Hokkaido Nippon-Ham Fighters (2017–2021); Saitama Seibu Lions (2021–2023)

Katsuhiko Kumon (公文 克彦, Kumon Katsuhiko; born March 4, 1992) is a Japanese former professional baseball pitcher. He played in Nippon Professional Baseball (NPB) from 2013 to 2023 for the Yomiuri Giants, Hokkaido Nippon-Ham Fighters, and Saitama Seibu Lions.

== Professional career ==
=== Yomiuri Giants ===
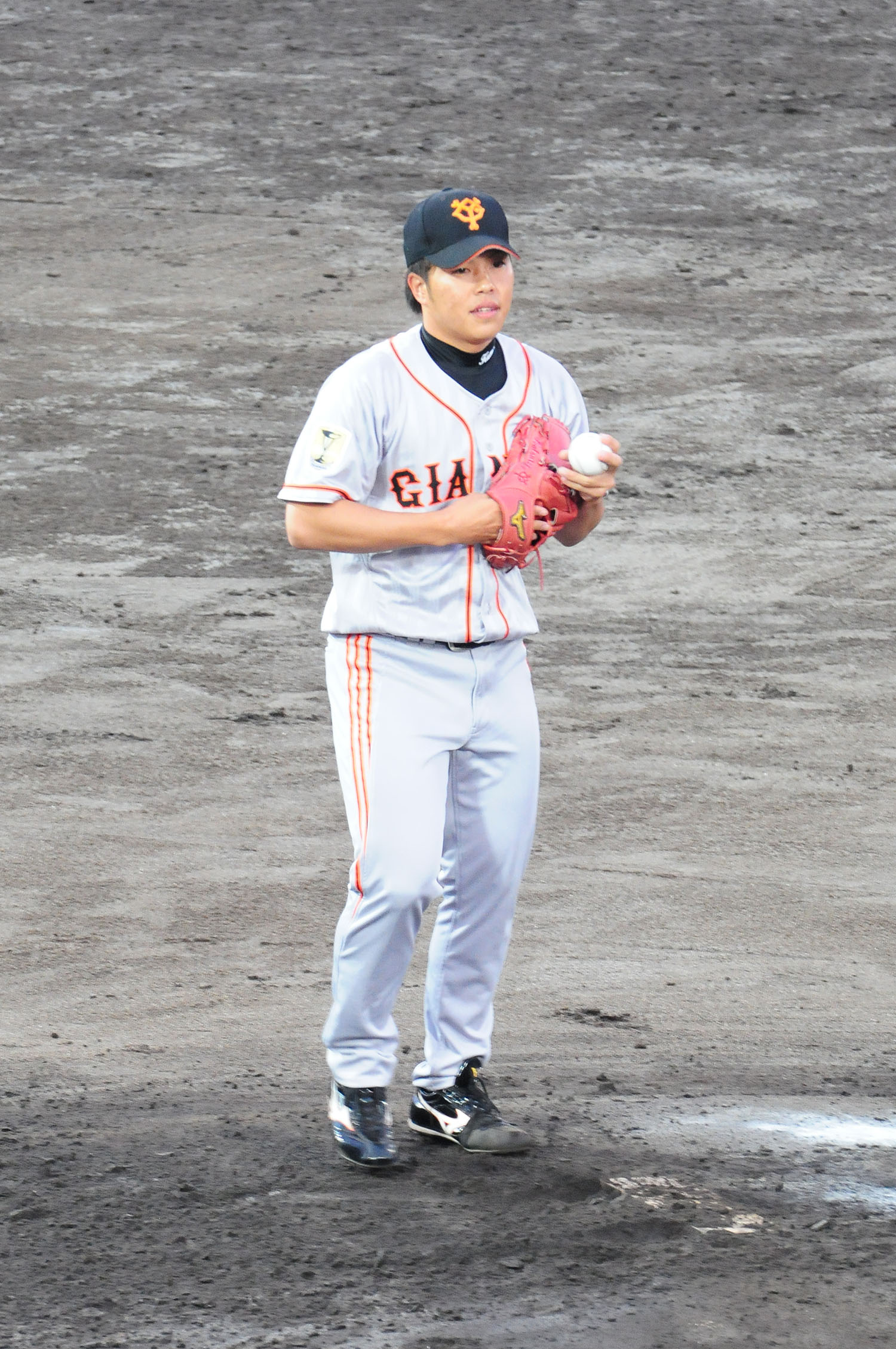
Kumon with the Yomiuri Giants

On October 25, 2012, Kumon was drafted by the Yomiuri Giants in the 2012 Nippon Professional Baseball draft.

On September 25, 2013, Kumon made his debut as a relief pitcher in the Central League against the Tokyo Yakult Swallows.

Spanning the 2013 to 2016 seasons, Kumon pitched 15 total games in the Central League.

=== Hokkaido Nippon-Ham Fighters ===
On November 2, 2016, Kumon and Taishi Ohta were traded to the Hokkaido Nippon-Ham Fighters in exchange for Mitsuo Yoshikawa and Shingo Ishikawa.

In 2017 season, Kumon finished the regular season having compiled a 3–0 record and 2.70 ERA with 33 strikeouts in 36 2/3 innings pitched across 41 appearances. He pitched in 57 games for the Fighters in 2018, recording a 2.17 ERA with 11 holds and 52 strikeouts over 54 innings of work.

On August 29, 2019, Kumon broke the NPB record for undefeated pitchers in 165 games. In the regular season, he logged a 2–0 record and 3.96 ERA with 17 holds and 31 strikeouts spanning 52 1/3 innings pitched across 61 games.

Kumon pitched in 29 contests for Hokkaido during the 2020 season, struggling to an 0–2 record and 7.88 ERA with 19 strikeouts and one save across 24 innings pitched.

=== Saitama Seibu Lions ===
On August 12, 2021, Kumon and Shota Hiranuma were traded to the Saitama Seibu Lions in exchange for Fumikazu Kimura and Ryusei Satoh.
