= Shōta Hiranuma =

Japanese baseball player (born 1997)

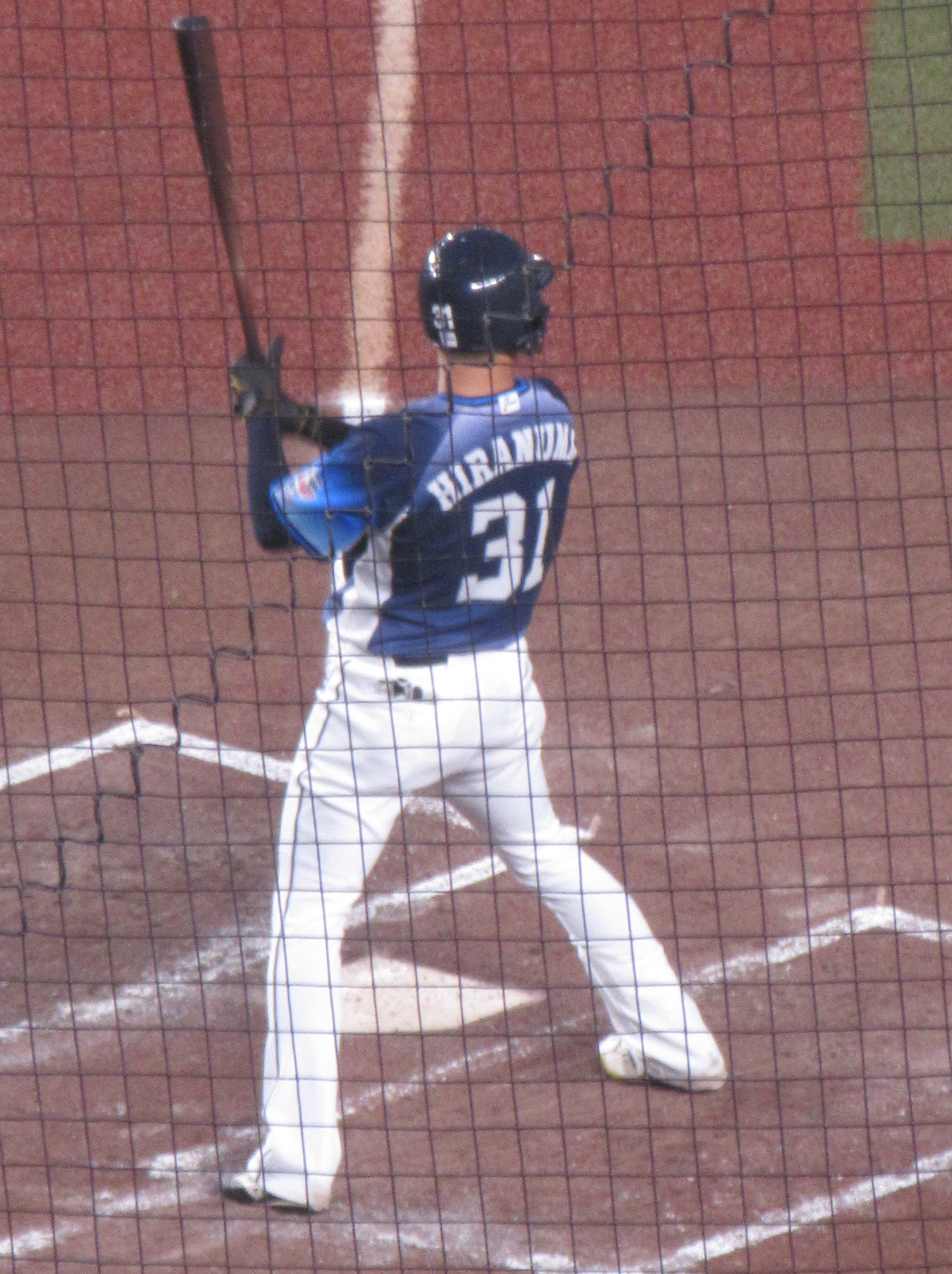

Orix Buffaloes – No. 61
- Infielder
- Born: August 16, 1997 (age 28); Fukui, Fukui, Japan
- Bats: Left Throws: Right

NPB debut
- April 20, 2017, for the Hokkaido Nippon-Ham Fighters

NPB statistics (through 2025 season)
- Batting average: .233
- Hits: 207
- Home runs: 4
- Runs batted in: 54
- Stolen base: 15
- Stats at Baseball Reference

Teams
- Hokkaido Nippon-Ham Fighters (2016–2021); Saitama Seibu Lions (2021–2025); Orix Buffaloes (2026–)

Shōta Hiranuma (平沼 翔太, Hiranuma Shōta; born August 16, 1997) is a professional Japanese baseball player. He plays infielder for the Orix Buffaloes of Nippon Professional Baseball (NPB).

== Career ==
=== Hokkaido Nippon-Ham Fighters ===
On October 25, 2015, Hiranuma was selected by the Hokkaido Nippon-Ham Fighters in the 4th round of the 2015 NPB draft.

On June 17, 2018, Hiranuma recorded his first hit in the NPB, a single to left field off Tokyo Yakult Swallows pitcher Taichi Ishiyama.

On July 26, 2019, in a game against his future team, the Saitama Seibu Lions, Hiranuma hit his first career home run off Ken Togame.

=== Saitama Seibu Lions ===
On August 12, 2021, Hiranuma was traded to the Saitama Seibu Lions along with Katsuhiko Kumon in exchange for Fumikazu Kimura and Ryūsei Satō.

=== Orix Buffaloes ===
On December 19, 2025, Hiranuma was selected by the Orix Buffaloes in the Active Player Draft.
