= Tomoya Mori =

Japanese baseball player (born 1995)

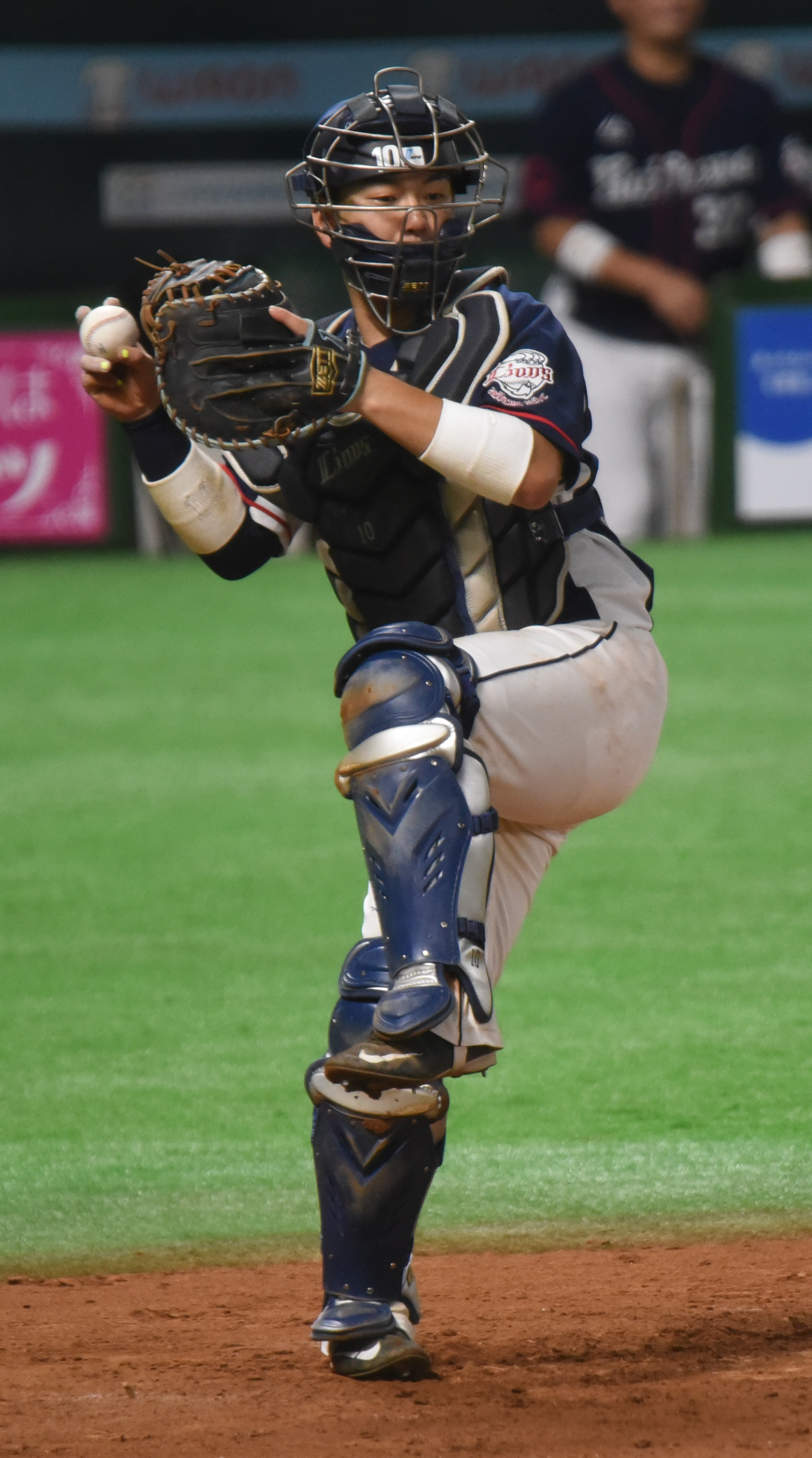

Orix Buffaloes – No. 4
- Catcher
- Born: August 8, 1995 (age 30)
- Bats: Left Throws: Right

NPB debut
- July 30, 2014, for the Saitama Seibu Lions

NPB statistics (through 2023 Season)
- Batting average: .289
- Hits: 1,022
- Home runs: 120
- Runs batted in: 513
- Stats at Baseball Reference

Teams
- Saitama Seibu Lions (2014–2022); Orix Buffaloes (2023–present)

Career highlights and awards
- Pacific League MVP (2019); 4× Best Nine Award (2018, 2019, 2021, 2023); 1× Pacific League batting champion (2019); 6× NPB All-Star (2015, 2018, 2019, 2021, 2022, 2023); 2× Best Battery Award with Pitcher Shinsaburō Tawata (2018) and Pitcher Tatsushi Masuda (2019); 2× NPB All-Star Most Valuable Player Award (2018, 2019); SKY PerfecTV! Dramatic Sayonara Award Annual Grand Prize (2018); Outstanding Player Award (2014)
Medals
Men's baseball
Representing Japan
18U Baseball World Cup
Silver medal – second place	2013 Taichung	Team

Tomoya Mori (森 友哉, Mori Tomoya; born August 8, 1995) is a Japanese professional baseball catcher for the Orix Buffaloes of Nippon Professional Baseball. He has previously played in NPB for the Saitama Seibu Lions.

== Career ==
=== Saitama Seibu Lions ===
In 2015, Mori was named an All-Star for the first time in his career.

He was a member of the Melbourne Aces of the Australian Baseball League for the 2017-18 season.

He was again selected as an all-star in 2018.

In 2019 he was named Pacific League MVP.

In 2022, he became a free agent.

=== Orix Buffaloes ===
In 2023, he signed with the Orix Buffaloes.

On September 10, 2023, Mori collected his 1,000th career NPB hit, becoming the 316th player to accomplish the feat.

== International career ==
On October 10, 2018, he was selected Japan national baseball team at the 2018 MLB Japan All-Star Series.
