= Ryosuke Kikuchi =

Japanese baseball player (born 1990)

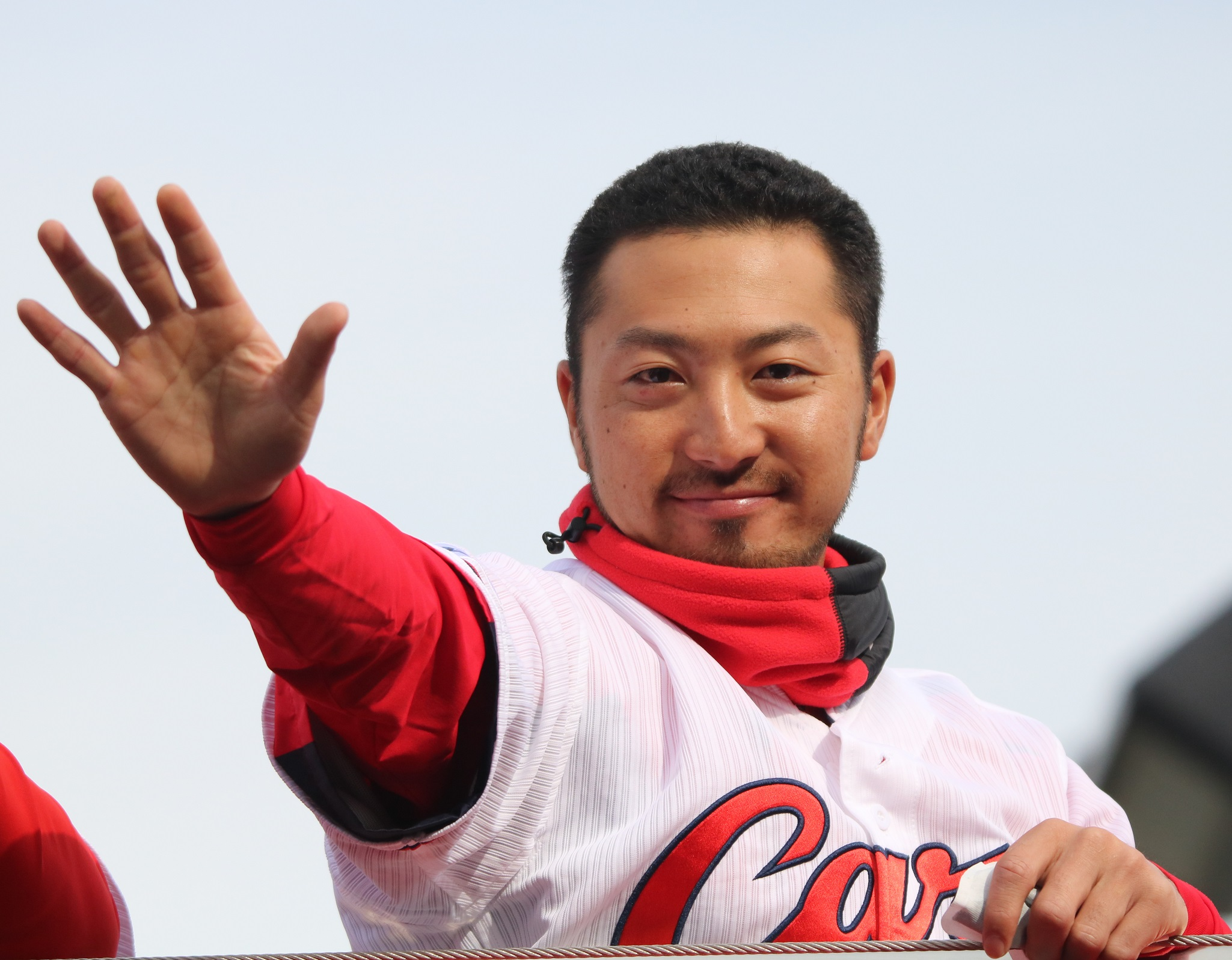
- Kikuchi with the Hiroshima Toyo Carp

Hiroshima Toyo Carp – No. 33
- Infielder
- Born: March 11, 1990 (age 36); Higashiyamato, Tokyo, Japan
- Bats: Right Throws: Right

NPB debut
- June 30, 2012, for the Hiroshima Toyo Carp

NPB statistics (through 2025)
- Batting average: .267
- Hits: 1,789
- Home runs: 135
- RBI: 618
- Stolen Bases: 127
- Stats at Baseball Reference

Teams
- Hiroshima Toyo Carp (2012–present)

Career highlights and awards
- NPB: 10× Central League Golden Glove Award (2013–2022); 7× NPB All-Star (2014–2019, 2021); 2× Best Nine Award (2017, 2020); 2018 CLCS MVP; International: WBSC Premier12 Outstanding Defensive Player (2019); WBSC Premier12 All-World Team (2019)
Medals
Men's baseball
Representing Japan
Summer Olympics
Gold medal – first place	2020 Tokyo	Team
WBSC Premier12
Gold medal – first place	2019 Tokyo	Team

Ryosuke Kikuchi (菊池 涼介, Kikuchi Ryōsuke; born March 11, 1990) is a Japanese professional baseball player for the Hiroshima Toyo Carp of the Nippon Professional Baseball (NPB).

He has the records for most assists (535) and highest fielding percentage (1.000) in a single-season and longest error-free streak (569), these are all NPB records by a second baseman.

== Early baseball career ==
A native of Tokyo, he played as a third baseman for Tokyo City University Shiojiri High School, but his team never made it past the qualifying round for Summer Koshien. He enrolled in Chukyo Gakuin University in Gifu Prefecture, and from the spring of his 1st year, he played as a shortstop as his school competed in the Tokai Region Baseball League. He won a triple-crown in his second year, and throughout his university career, he was awarded League Best Nine 5 times. His dynamic fielding earned him praise when he participated in the US-Japan University Baseball Championship Series.

== Professional career ==
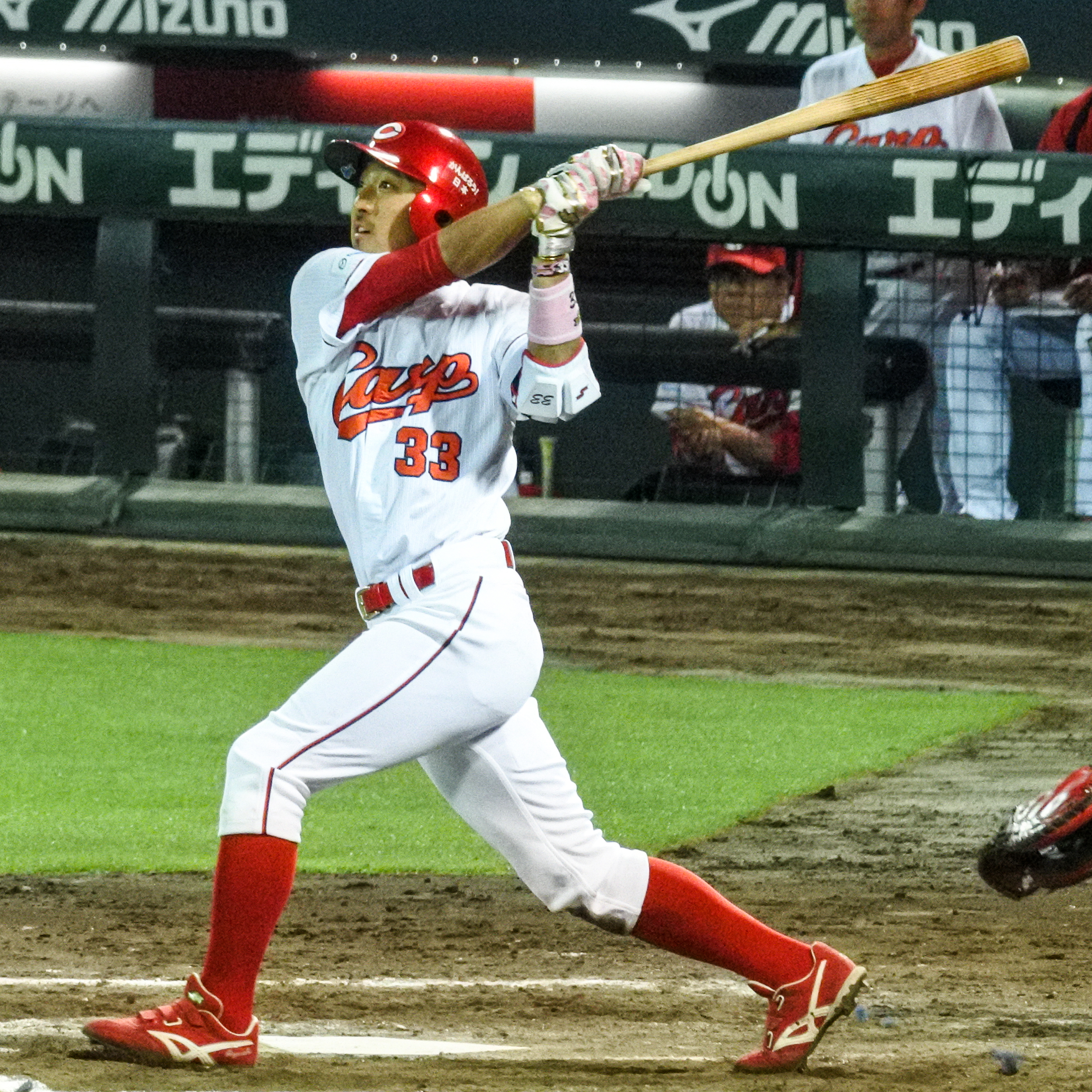
Kikuchi batting for the Carp in 2015

He was selected as the Hiroshima Toyo Carp's 2nd pick during the autumn 2011 Nippon Professional Baseball draft. He wished to be given Manager Kenjiro Nomura's previous jersey number 7, but was instead assigned the number 33.

In 2012, he appeared in his first official game on June 29 as a pinch runner for Tetsuya Okubo. From July onwards, he filled in the role of 2nd baseman after Akihiro Higashide was sidelined by an injury in his right middle finger. He appeared in 63 games, and batted in 12 runs.

In 2013, After Higashide injured his knee during spring training, Kikuchi eventually became fixed in the starting line-up. On May 12, he and Yoshihiro Maru hit two grand slams in the game against the Chunichi Dragons, the 22nd time it happened in NPB history. This was the first time in both the player's professional careers to hit a grand slam. Maru hit one in the 4th inning, and Kikuchi followed in the 6th. A plaque commemorating the team's two-grand-slam game was installed beyond the left field wall at Mazda Stadium two days later. On September 26, he recorded his 497th assist as second baseman, breaking the previous NPB record held by Chunichi's Masahiro Araki in 2005. He finished the season with 528 assists, setting an all-time NPB high. Three days later in a match with the Giants, he batted in his 50th sac bunt, beating the franchise record held by Higashide in 2001, and also topped the league. He appeared in 141 games of the 144 on the schedule, and though he batted only .247, he hit 11 home runs and drove in 57.

In 2018, he was selected to the 2018 NPB All-Star game, making it his fifth consecutive appearance at the NPB All-Star series.

After the 2019 season, Carp announced it was allowing Kikuchi to enter the posting system to play in Major League Baseball (MLB). However, Kikuchi signed a 4-year contract extension worth ¥300 million ($2.7 million) a year with the Carp on December 27, 2019 after failing to secure a deal with any of the MLB teams.

== International career ==
Kikuchi represented the Japan national baseball team in the 2013 exhibition game against Chinese Taipei national baseball team, 2014 MLB Japan All-Star Series, 2015 exhibition games against Europe, 2016 exhibition games against Chinese Taipei, 2016 exhibition games against Mexico and Netherlands, 2017 World Baseball Classic, 2018 MLB Japan All-Star Series and 2019 WBSC Premier12.

On August 20, 2018, he was selected 2018 MLB Japan All-Star Series.

On October 1, 2019, he was selected at the 2019 WBSC Premier12, where he was named the tournament's outstanding defensive player.
