= Shingo Ishikawa =

Japanese baseball player (born 1993)

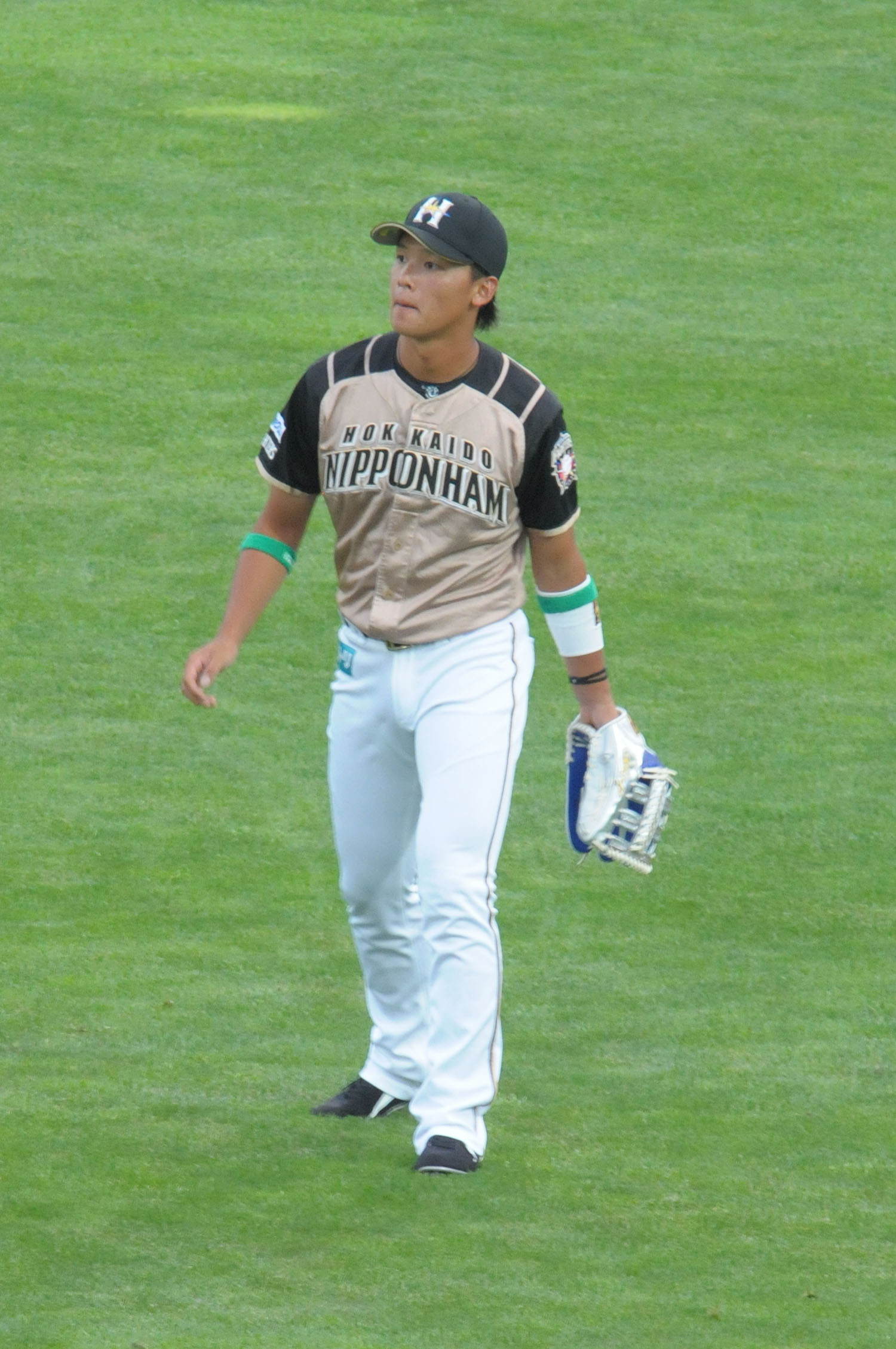
- Ishikawa with the Hokkaido Nippon Ham Fighters

Chiba Lotte Marines – No. 23
- Outfielder
- Born: April 27, 1993 (age 33); Sakai, Osaka, Japan
- Bats: Right Throws: Right

NPB debut
- August 22, 2013, for the Hokkaido Nippon-Ham Fighters

Career statistics (through 2024 season)
- Batting average: .240
- Hits: 203
- Home runs: 17
- RBI: 77
- Stolen Bases: 3
- Stats at Baseball Reference

Teams
- Hokkaido Nippon-Ham Fighters (2013–2016); Yomiuri Giants (2017–2023); Chiba Lotte Marines (2023–present)

Shingo Ishikawa (石川 慎吾, Ishikawa Shingo; born April 27, 1993), nicknamed "Dynamite Shingo", is a Japanese professional baseball outfielder of the Chiba Lotte Marines for Nippon Professional Baseball (NPB). He previously played in NPB for the Hokkaido Nippon-Ham Fighters and Yomiuri Giants.

== Professional career ==
=== Hokkaido Nippon-Ham Fighters ===
Ishikawa began career in the Nippon Professional Baseball (NPB) league with the Hokkaido Nippon-Ham Fighters in 2013. His debut marked the start of a promising career in Japan's top baseball league. During his tenure with the Fighters from 2013 to 2016, Ishikawa showed potential with his right-handed batting and throwing skills. Although his batting average was not among the highest, he was known for his agility and speed on the field. His time with the Fighters, however, laid the foundation for his professional growth in the NPB league.

=== Yomiuri Giants ===
On November 2 2016, it was revealed that Ishikawa had been included in a trade with the Yomiuri Giants with Mitsuo Yoshikawa for Giants outfielder Taishi Ota and Katsuhiko Kumon.

=== Chiba Lotte Marines ===
On 3 July 2023, Ishikawa was traded to the Chiba Lotte Marines in exchange for Kenta Onuma.

== International career ==
On November 16, 2018, he was selected Yomiuri Giants roster at the 2018 MLB Japan All-Star Series exhibition game against MLB All-Stars.
