= Hideto Asamura =

Japanese baseball player (born 1990)

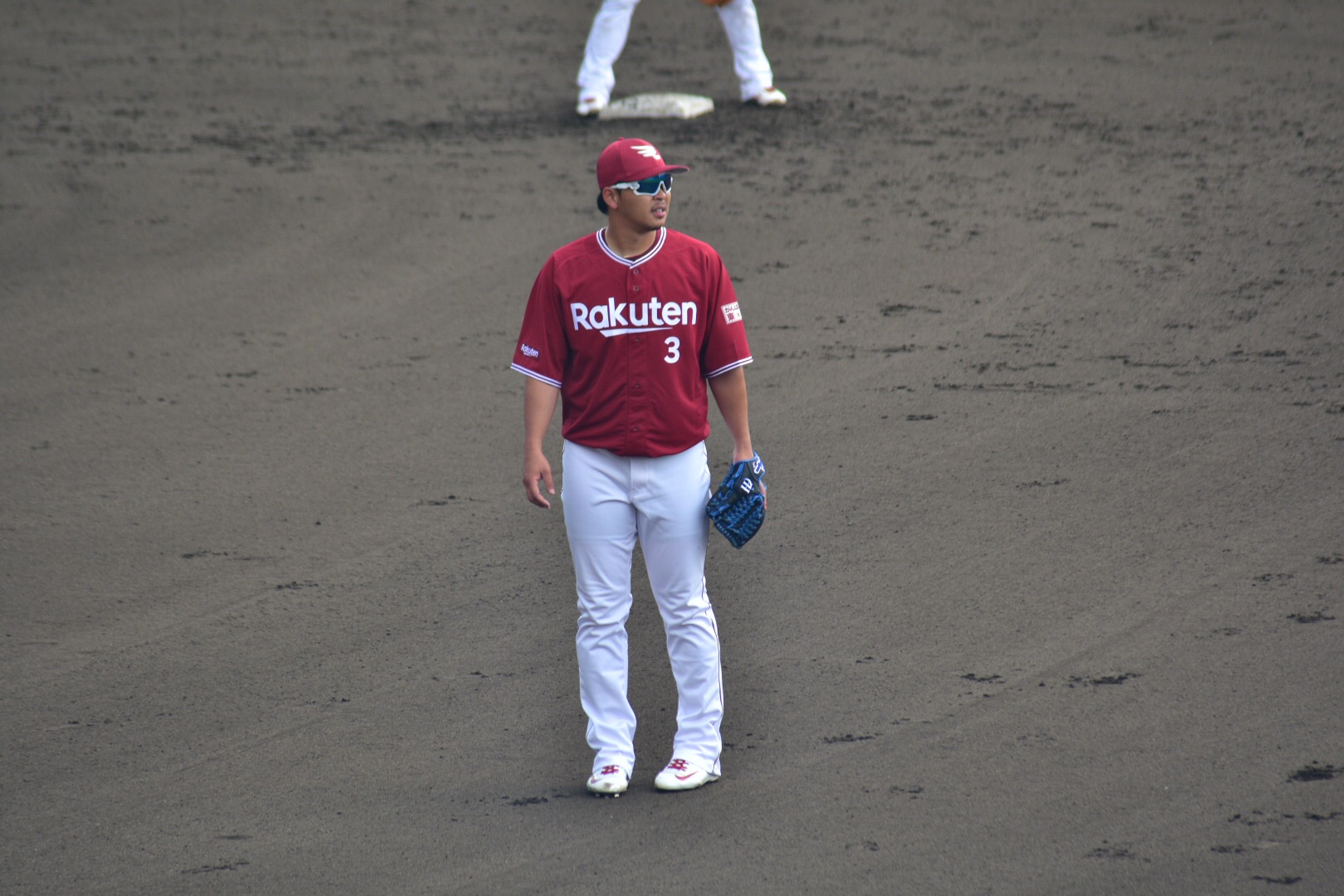
- Asamura with the Tohoku Rakuten Golden Eagles

Tohoku Rakuten Golden Eagles – No. 3
- Infielder
- Born: November 12, 1990 (age 35); Higashiyodogawa-ku, Osaka, Japan
- Bats: Right Throws: Right

NPB debut
- March 31, 2010, for the Saitama Seibu Lions

NPB statistics (through 2026 season)
- Batting average: .274
- Hits: 2,105
- Home runs: 315
- Runs batted in: 1,201
- Stolen base: 80
- Stats at Baseball Reference

Teams
- Saitama Seibu Lions (2009–2018); Tohoku Rakuten Golden Eagles (2019–present)

Career highlights and awards
- 9× NPB All-Star (2013–2019, 2021, 2022); 8× Best Nine Award (2013, 2016–2020, 2022, 2023); 2× Golden Glove Award (2013, 2019); 2× Pacific League RBI leader (2013, 2018); 2× Pacific League home run leader (2020, 2023); SKY PerfecTV! Dramatic Sayonara Award Annual Grand Prize (2013)
Medals
Men's baseball
Representing Japan
Summer Olympics
| Gold medal – first place | 2020 Tokyo | Team |
WBSC Premier12
| Gold medal – first place | 2019 Tokyo | Team |

Hideto Asamura (浅村 栄斗, Asamura Hideto; born November 12, 1990) is a Japanese professional baseball infielder for the Tohoku Rakuten Golden Eagles of the Nippon Professional Baseball (NPB). He has previously played in NPB for the Saitama Seibu Lions.

== Early life ==
Asamura attended Osaka Tōin High School and contributed to the school's victory at the 2008 national championships. He hit a total of 22 home runs during his three years of high school, including one in his final at bat for the school in October 2008. He was drafted by the Lions in the third round of the 2008 rookie draft.

== Professional career ==
=== Saitama Seibu Lions ===
After spending 2009 with the Lions' farm team in the Eastern League, Asamura was a part of the first-team squad at the start of the 2010 season. In 2011, he spent the entire year as a starting member of the team. However, his fielding position was not constant, including stints in the outfield. In the month of October he recorded a batting average of .460 and won the Monthly MVP award. In 2012, he again started the year with the first-team squad, but poor batting form saw him relegated to the farm team in late May. He became the team's leadoff hitter in August following an injury to Takumi Kuriyama.

In 2013, his fourth year as a professional and at age 23, Asamura tied the record for the youngest person in Japanese baseball history to record 100 RBIs in a season. He finished the year leading the Pacific League with 110 RBIs.

Asamura started the 2014 season as the Lions' number 4 batter due to Takeya Nakamura's absence because of injury. After the first 15 games batting in this position, he led his team with a .333 batting average, 4 home runs and 16 RBIs. On 21 May 2014, Asamura collided with a teammate in a match against the Yomiuri Giants. In the following days he started to feel pain in his left knee but continued as a starter until June 4. He eventually succumbed to the injury and was removed from the Lions' roster on June 5; he missed 6 weeks of play before returning just prior to the All-Star break as a pinch hitter on 15 July. At the time of his injury he was leading the Lions in both home runs and RBIs but struggled upon his return, finishing the season with only half of the RBIs he scored in the previous year. He described 2014 as a "miserable season in all facets". At the end of the season he underwent surgery on his left shoulder.

Asamura had a limited pre-season but was at full health for the start of the 2015 season; he maintained his fitness and missed only 2 of the Lions' 143 games. He scored 81 RBIs in the season but his 13 home runs remained low when compared to the 27 hit in 2013.

He was selected 2018 NPB All-Star game.

=== Tohoku Rakuten Golden Eagles ===
During the 2018 offseason, Asamura exercised his free-agent option and he agreed to a contract with Tohoku Rakuten Golden Eagles on November 21.

== International career ==
Asamura represented the Japan national baseball team in the 2013 exhibition games against Chinese Taipei and 2019 WBSC Premier12.

In September 2015 Asamura was included in the 45-man squad that was selected to represent Japan at the 2015 WBSC Premier12 tournament in Taiwan, however was not included in the final 28-man roster that was announced in October.

On October 1, 2019, he was selected at the 2019 WBSC Premier12.

== See also ==
- List of top Nippon Professional Baseball home run hitters
- List of Nippon Professional Baseball players with 1,000 runs batted in
- List of Nippon Professional Baseball career hits leaders
