= Neftalí Soto (baseball) =

Puerto Rican baseball player (born 1989)

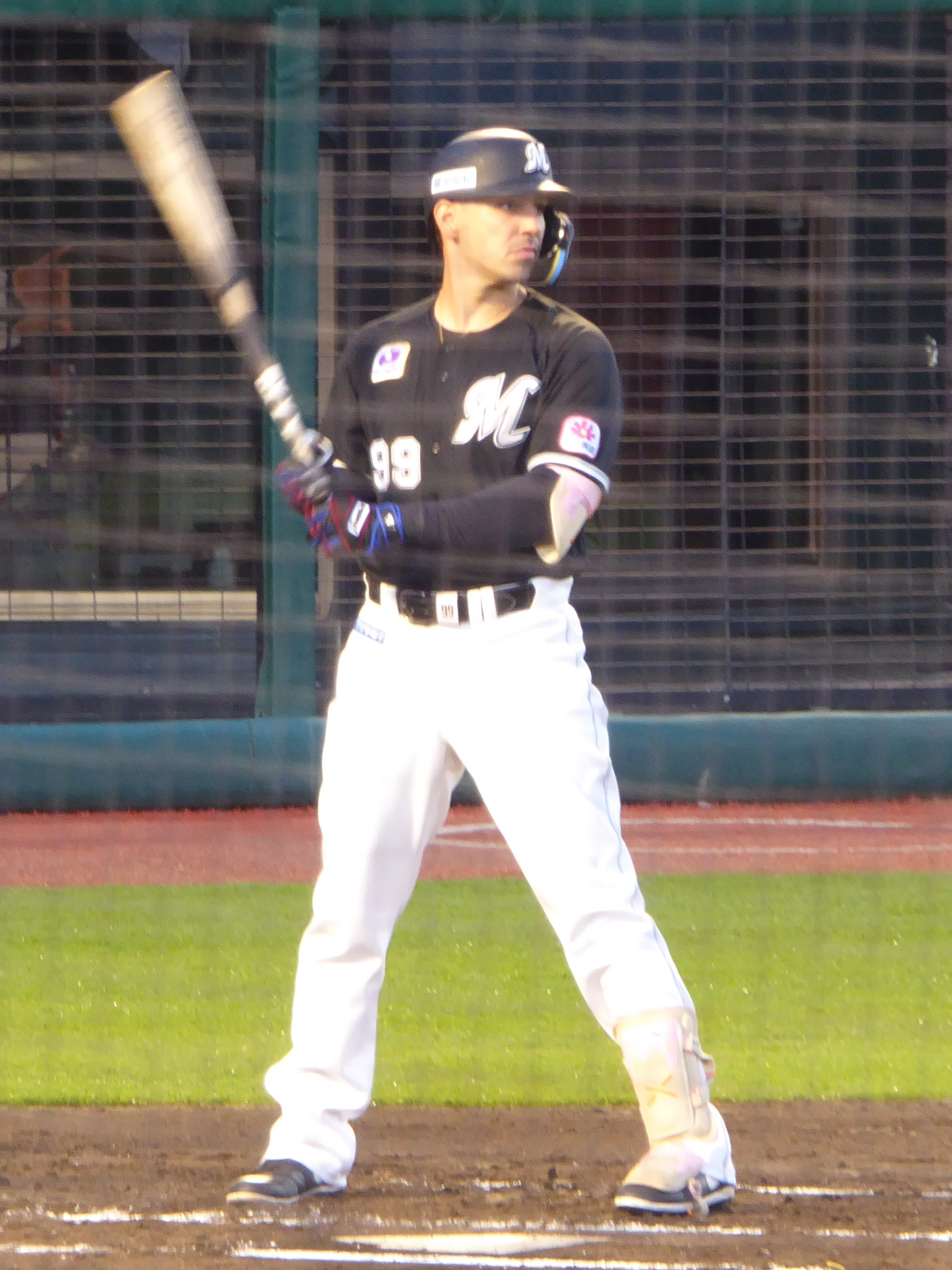
- Soto with the Chiba Lotte Marines in 2024

Chiba Lotte Marines – No. 99
- First baseman / Third baseman
- Born: February 28, 1989 (age 37); Manatí, Puerto Rico
- Bats: Right Throws: Right

Professional debut
- MLB: 18 May, 2013, for the Cincinnati Reds
- NPB: 7 May, 2018, for the Yokohama DeNA BayStars

MLB statistics (through 2014 season)
- Batting average: .071
- Home runs: 0
- Runs batted in: 1

NPB statistics (through August 19, 2026)
- Batting average: .257
- Home runs: 210
- Runs batted in: 616
- Stats at Baseball Reference

Teams
- Cincinnati Reds (2013–2014); Yokohama DeNA BayStars (2018–2023); Chiba Lotte Marines (2024–present)

Career highlights and awards
- JCL home run leader (2018, 2019); JCL RBI leader (2019)

Neftalí O. Soto (born February 28, 1989) is a Puerto Rican professional baseball first baseman for the Chiba Lotte Marines of Nippon Professional Baseball (NPB). He has previously played in Major League Baseball (MLB) for the Cincinnati Reds and in NPB for the Yokohama DeNA BayStars.

He led the Central League with 41 home runs in the 2018 season, and with 43 in the 2019 season.

== Early life ==
Soto was born in Manatí, Puerto Rico and attended Colegio Marista High School.

== Professional career ==
=== Cincinnati Reds ===
The Reds drafted Soto with a supplemental third-round pick in the 2007 Major League Baseball draft. He played the rest of the 2007 season with the Gulf Coast League Reds rookie-class team, hitting .303 with two homers and 28 RBI.

Soto started 2008 with the rookie-class Billings Mustangs, where he hit .388 in 67 at-bats, belting four homers with 11 RBI. His performance earned him a promotion to low-A Dayton. In 218 at-bats for the Dragons, he hit .326 with seven homers and 36 RBI.

Soto was promoted again for 2009, this time to the advanced-A Sarasota Reds. He played a full season at Sarasota, getting 505 at-bats and hitting .248 with 11 homers and 57 RBI. The Reds advanced-A team moved to Lynchburg for 2010, where Soto played for the 2010 season. In 522 at-bats he hit .268 with 21 homers and 73 RBI.

In 2011, Soto played for the double-A Carolina Mudcats. He played in 102 games (379 at-bats), hitting .272 with an impressive 30 homers and 76 RBI. After the double-A season, he played in four games for triple-A Louisville, going 7-for-17 with another home run and four more RBI. His season slugging percentage was .576. Soto was named Southern League player of the week twice during the season for Carolina.

Entering his fifth year of eligibility (which would make him eligible for the Rule 5 Draft), the Reds placed him on the 40-man roster following the 2011 season.

Soto was called up to the Major Leagues for the first time on 18 May 2013. In 13 games with the Reds, he batted 0-for-12.

In 2014, he began the season on the Reds' big-league roster, and tallied his first career RBI on 7 April against the St. Louis Cardinals with a sacrifice fly off Trevor Rosenthal to drive in Ryan Ludwick. On 14 April he got his first big-league hit, a fifth-inning double off the Pittsburgh Pirates' Wandy Rodriguez.

Soto was outrighted off the Reds roster on 28 October 2014.

=== Chicago White Sox ===
On 23 March 2015, Soto was traded to the Chicago White Sox for cash considerations. He spent the year with the Triple-A Charlotte Knights and elected free agency after the season.

=== Washington Nationals ===
On 8 February 2016, Soto signed a minor league deal with the Washington Nationals. After splitting time between the Double-A Harrisburg Senators and the Triple-A Syracuse Chiefs in 2016 and putting up a combined .274/.318/.408 slash line with 10 home runs, Soto was invited to major league spring training as a non-roster player in 2017. Soto was not selected to the Nationals roster, but he went on to have a much stronger season with Harrisburg and then Syracuse, with a .311/.364/.528 slash line and 24 home runs across both levels.

On 6 November 2017, he elected free agency.

=== Yokohama DeNA BayStars ===
On 10 November 2017, Soto signed with the Yokohama DeNA BayStars of Nippon Professional Baseball (NPB).

In 2018 season, Soto finished the 2018 season with a .310 batting average, 41 home runs, 95 RBI, a .364 on-base percentage, a .644 slugging percentage, and 1.008 on-base plus slugging. He led the Central League with 41 home runs.

On 18 November 2019, Soto signed a 1-year extension to remain with the BayStars.

On 19 September 2020, Soto hit his 100th home run in Japan in a 7–1 win. He is the 81st imported player to reach the 100-home run milestone in Japan.

On 17 May 2023, Soto hit his 150th home run in NPB, placing him 4th all-time in BayStars history for foreign players. In 109 games for Yokohama he batted .235/.316/.415 with 14 home runs and 50 RBI. On 30 November, Soto elected free agency.

=== Chiba Lotte Marines ===
On 13 December 2023, Soto signed with the Chiba Lotte Marines of Nippon Professional Baseball.

On 30 January 2026, Soto was appointed captain for 2026, making him the second foreign captain in the franchise's history.
