= 2018 Central League Climax Series =

First stage
Team (Wins)		Manager	Season
Yomiuri Giants (2)		Yoshinobu Takahashi	67–71–5 (.486), 13.5 GB
Tokyo Yakult Swallows (0)		Junji Ogawa	75–66–2 (.532), 7 GB
- Dates: October 13–14

Final stage
Team (Wins)		Manager	Season
Hiroshima Toyo Carp (4)		Koichi Ogata	82–59–2 (.582), 7 GA
Yomiuri Giants (0)		Yoshinobu Takahashi	67–71–5 (.486), 13.5 GB
- Dates: October 17–19
- MVP: Ryosuke Kikuchi (Carp)

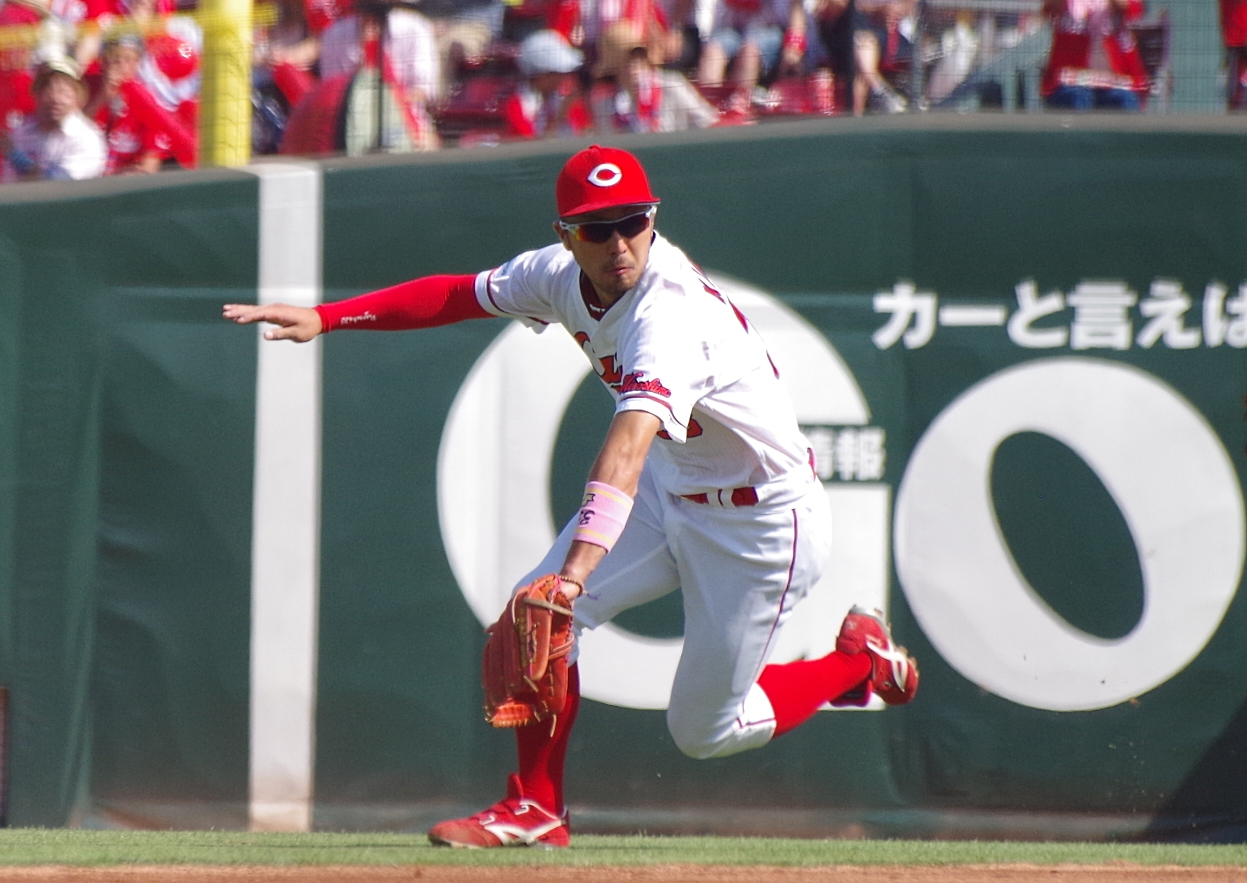

The 2018 Central League Climax Series (CLCS) was a post-season playoff consisting of two consecutive series that determined who would represent the Central League in the Japan Series. The First Stage was a best-of-three series and the Final Stage was a best-of-six with the top seed being awarded a one-win advantage. The winner of the series advanced to the 2018 Japan Series, where they competed against the 2018 Pacific League Climax Series winner. The top three regular-season finishers played in the two series. The CLCS began with the first game of the First Stage on October 13.

== First stage ==
=== Summary ===
Yomiuri Giants won the series, 2–0.

Game	Date	Score	Location	Time	Attendance
1	October 13	Yomiuri Giants – 4, Tokyo Yakult Swallows – 1	Meiji Jingu Stadium	3:06	30,735
2	October 14	Yomiuri Giants – 4, Tokyo Yakult Swallows – 0	Meiji Jingu Stadium	2:40	30,798

=== Game 1 ===
Saturday, October 13, 2018, 6:00 pm (JST) at Meiji Jingu Stadium in Shinjuku, Tokyo
Team	1	2	3	4	5	6	7	8	9	R	H	E
Yomiuri	1	0	1	0	0	0	2	0	0	4	6	1
Yakult	0	1	0	0	0	0	0	0	0	1	4	0
WP: Koji Uehara (1–0) LP: Yasuhiro Ogawa (0–1) Sv: Shun Yamaguchi (1); Home runs: YOM: Hayato Sakamoto (1); YAK: None; Attendance: 30,735

=== Game 2 ===
Sunday, October 14, 2018, 6:00 pm (JST) at Meiji Jingu Stadium in Shinjuku, Tokyo
Team	1	2	3	4	5	6	7	8	9	R	H	E
Yomiuri	0	1	0	3	0	0	0	0	0	4	7	0
Yakult	0	0	0	0	0	0	0	0	0	0	0	0
WP: Tomoyuki Sugano (1–0) LP: Juri Hara (0–1); Home runs: YOM: Hisayoshi Chono (1), Casey McGehee (1), Yoshiyuki Kamei (1); YAK: None; Attendance: 30,798

== Final stage ==
=== Summary ===
Hiroshima Toyo Carp won the series, 4–0*.

Game	Date	Score	Location	Time	Attendance
1	October 17	Yomiuri Giants – 1, Hiroshima Toyo Carp – 6	Mazda Stadium	3:07	31,311
2	October 18	Yomiuri Giants – 1, Hiroshima Toyo Carp – 4	Mazda Stadium	2:26	31,356
3	October 19	Yomiuri Giants – 1, Hiroshima Toyo Carp – 5	Mazda Stadium	3:02	31,371

* The Central League regular season champion is given a one-game advantage in the Final Stage.

=== Game 1 ===
Wednesday, October 17, 2018, 6:00 pm (JST) at Mazda Zoom-Zoom Stadium Hiroshima in Hiroshima, Hiroshima Prefecture
Team	1	2	3	4	5	6	7	8	9	R	H	E
Yomiuri	0	0	0	0	0	1	0	0	0	1	5	0
Hiroshima	1	0	0	3	0	0	1	1	X	6	9	0
WP: Daichi Osera (1–0) LP: Cristopher Mercedes (0–1); Home runs: YOM: None; HIR: Seiya Suzuki (1), Yoshihiro Maru (1); Attendance: 31,311

=== Game 2 ===
Thursday, October 18, 2018, 6:00 pm (JST) at Mazda Zoom-Zoom Stadium Hiroshima in Hiroshima, Hiroshima Prefecture
Team	1	2	3	4	5	6	7	8	9	R	H	E
Yomiuri	0	0	0	0	0	1	0	0	0	1	3	0
Hiroshima	0	0	0	0	0	0	0	4	X	4	3	1
WP: Kris Johnson (1–0) LP: Seishu Hatake (0–1) Sv: Shota Nakazaki (1); Home runs: YOM: None; HIR: Ryosuke Kikuchi (1); Attendance: 31,356

=== Game 3 ===
Thursday, October 19, 2018, 6:00 pm (JST) at Mazda Zoom-Zoom Stadium Hiroshima in Hiroshima, Hiroshima Prefecture
Team	1	2	3	4	5	6	7	8	9	R	H	E
Yomiuri	0	0	0	0	0	1	0	0	0	1	4	2
Hiroshima	0	2	1	0	2	0	0	0	X	5	5	1
WP: Aren Kuri (1–0) LP: Nobutaka Imamura (0–1) Sv: Geronimo Franzua (1); Home runs: YOM: None; HIR: Yoshihiro Maru (2); Attendance: 31,371
