= Shogo Akiyama =

Japanese baseball player (born 1988)

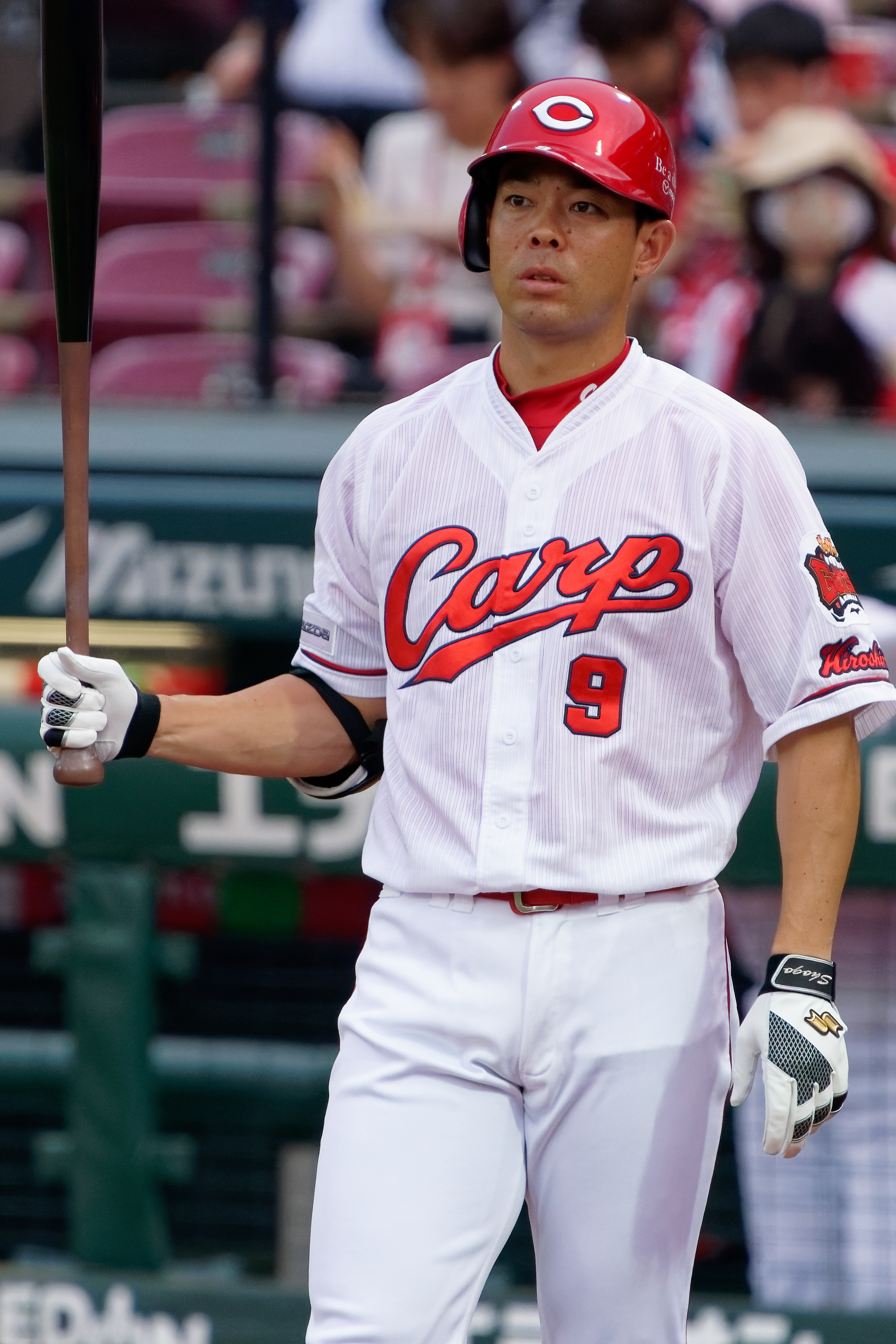
- Akiyama with the Hiroshima Toyo Carp

Hiroshima Toyo Carp – No. 9
- Outfielder
- Born: April 16, 1988 (age 38); Yokosuka, Kanagawa, Japan
- Bats: Left Throws: Right

Professional debut
- NPB: April 12, 2011, for the Saitama Seibu Lions
- MLB: July 24, 2020, for the Cincinnati Reds

NPB statistics (through August 18, 2026)
- Batting average: .296
- Hits: 1,803
- Home runs: 133
- Runs batted in: 623

MLB statistics
- Batting average: .224
- Hits: 71
- Home runs: 0
- Runs batted in: 21
- Stats at Baseball Reference

Teams
- Saitama Seibu Lions (2011–2019); Cincinnati Reds (2020–2021); Hiroshima Toyo Carp (2022–present)

Career highlights and awards
- 6× Pacific League Golden Glove Award (2013, 2015–2019); 4× Pacific League Best Nine Award (2015, 2017–2019); 7× NPB All-Star (2015–2019, 2023, 2024); NPB records: Most hits in a single season (216) (2015)
Medals
Men's baseball
Representing Japan
WBSC Premier12
Bronze medal – third place	2015 Tokyo	Team

Shogo Akiyama (秋山 翔吾, Akiyama Shōgo; Japanese pronunciation: [akiꜜjama ɕoꜜːɡo], born April 16, 1988) is a Japanese professional baseball outfielder for the Hiroshima Toyo Carp of Nippon Professional Baseball (NPB). He has previously played in Major League Baseball (MLB) for the Cincinnati Reds and in NPB for the Saitama Seibu Lions.

== Career ==
=== Saitama Seibu Lions ===
The Saitama Seibu Lions of Nippon Professional Baseball (NPB) selected Akiyama with the third selection in the 2010 NPB draft.

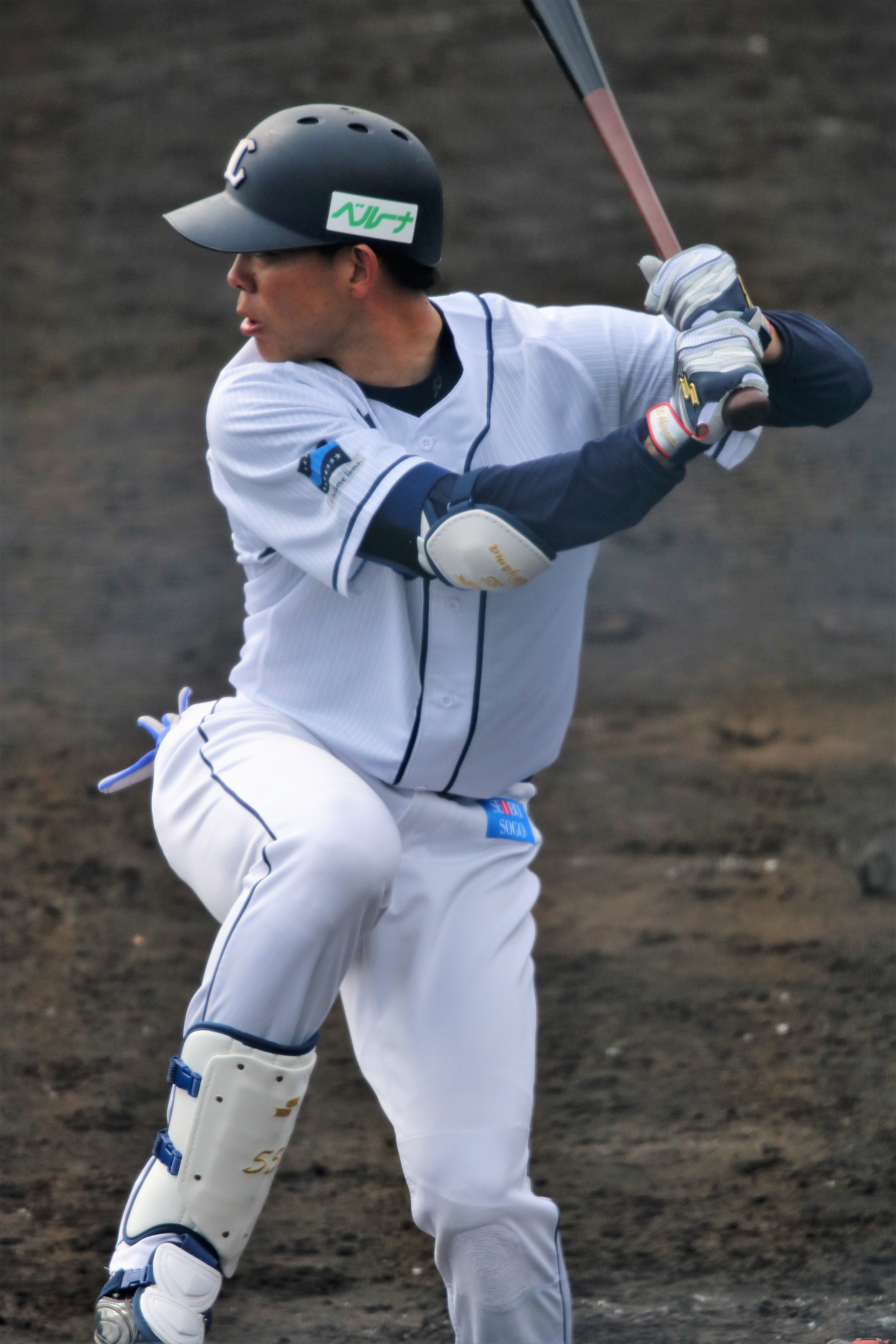
Akiyama batting for the Lions

In 2015, Akiyama set the NPB record for hits in a single season with 216, surpassing the 214 collected by Matt Murton of the Hanshin Tigers in 2010. He also batted a career-best .359 average for the year. In 2017, he led the NPB with a .322 average. Over the last 5 seasons of his career in NPB (2015–2019), Akiyama batted a .321 average and appeared in 5 consecutive NPB All-Star games.

On October 29, 2019, Akiyama held a press conference to announce that he had filed for free agency for the rights to play overseas in Major League Baseball (MLB).

=== Cincinnati Reds ===
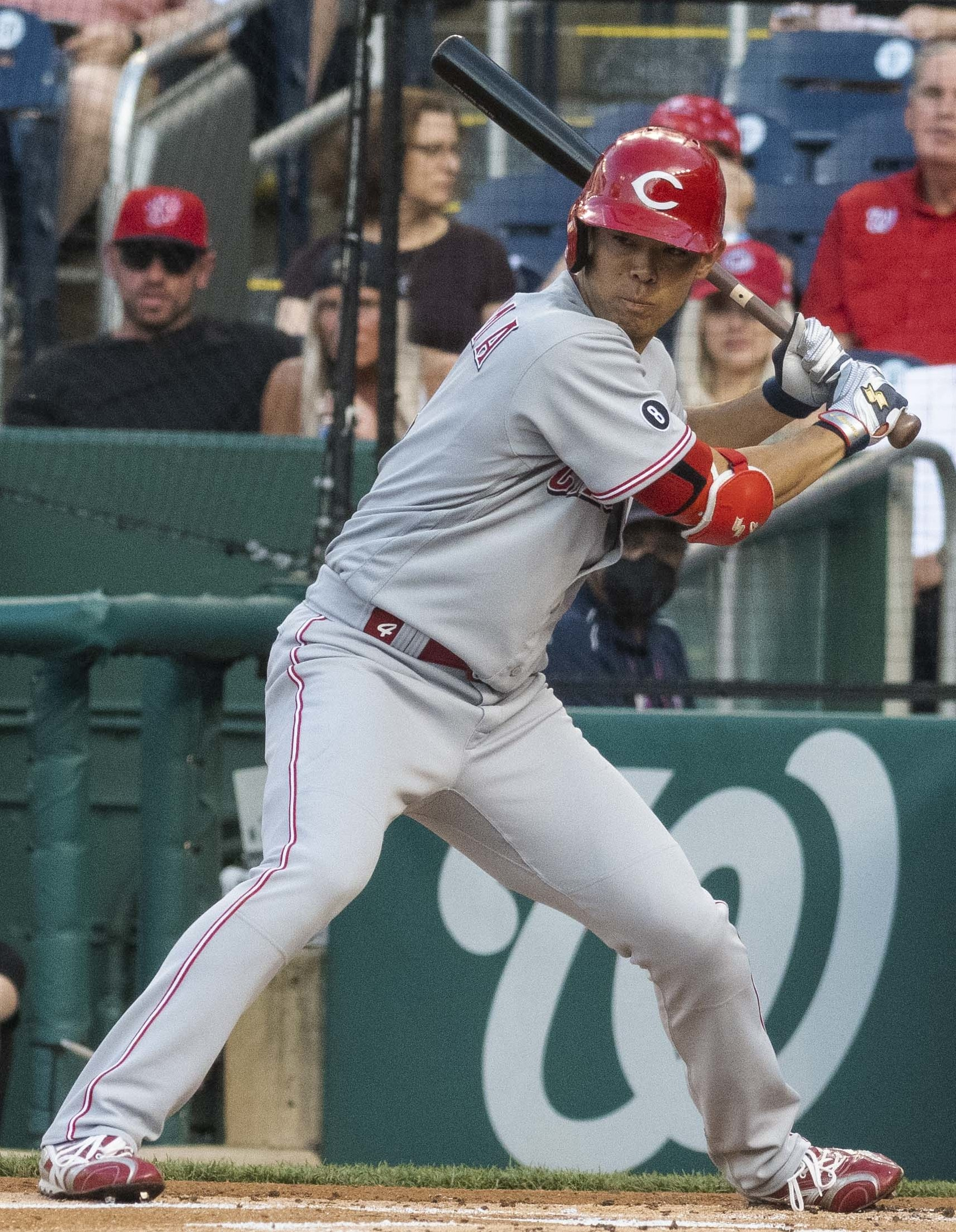
Akiyama with the Cincinnati Reds

On January 6, 2020, Akiyama signed a three-year, $21 million contract with the Cincinnati Reds. At the time, the Reds were the last team to have never had a Japanese-born player play for them. On July 24, 2020, Akiyama made his MLB debut. During the pandemic-shortened 2020 season, Akiyama hit .245/.357/.297 and made no defensive errors in 54 games. He was released by the Reds on April 5, 2022.

=== San Diego Padres ===
On April 30, 2022, Akiyama signed a minor league contract with the San Diego Padres. In 16 games for the Triple-A El Paso Chihuahuas, he batted .343/.378/.529 with three home runs and 21 runs batted in (RBIs). On June 16, Akiyama opted out of his contract and was released by the Padres organization.

=== Hiroshima Toyo Carp ===
On June 27, 2022, Akiyama signed a three-year contract with the Hiroshima Toyo Carp of NPB. Akiyama was given uniform number 9, which was once worn by the legendary player and former manager of the Carp, Koichi Ogata. In 2022, Akiyama played in 44 games as an outfielder and batted .265 with five home runs and 26 RBIs.

On April 15, 2023, Akiyama hit a game-ending home run (Sayonara home run) in the ninth inning, giving the Carp a 5–4 win over Yakult Swallows. It was the first game-ending home run for Akiyama in almost 11 years. He played in 115 games for the Carp in 2023, hitting .274/.333/.376 with four home runs, 38 RBI, and eight stolen bases. Following the season on October 31, Akiyama underwent surgery to remove part of the lateral meniscus in his right knee.

== International career ==
Akiyama represented the Japan national baseball team in the 2012 exhibition games against Cuba, 2013 exhibition games against Chinese Taipei, 2015 WBSC Premier12, 2016 exhibition games against Chinese Taipei, 2016 exhibition games against Mexico and Netherlands, 2017 World Baseball Classic and 2018 MLB Japan All-Star Series.

On October 1, 2019, Akiyama was selected to the 2019 WBSC Premier12. But on October 31, he broke his right toe due to a hit by pitch (HBP) in a practice game with Canada, and he withdrew from the 2019 WBSC Premier12.

== See also ==
- List of Major League Baseball players from Japan
