= 2018 Nippon Professional Baseball season =

2018 NPB season
- League: Nippon Professional Baseball
- Sport: Baseball
- Duration: March 30 – November 3
- Games: 143
- Teams: 12

Central League pennant
- League champions: Hiroshima Toyo Carp
- Runners-up: Tokyo Yakult Swallows
- Season MVP: Yoshihiro Maru (Hiroshima)

Pacific League pennant
- League champions: Saitama Seibu Lions
- Runners-up: Fukuoka SoftBank Hawks
- Season MVP: Hotaka Yamakawa (Seibu)

Climax Series
- CL champions: Hiroshima Toyo Carp
- CL runners-up: Yomiuri Giants
- PL champions: Fukuoka SoftBank Hawks
- PL runners-up: Saitama Seibu Lions

Japan Series
- Venue: Fukuoka Yafuoku! Dome, Chūō-ku, Fukuoka; Mazda Zoom-Zoom Stadium Hiroshima, Minami-ku, Hiroshima
- Champions: Fukuoka SoftBank Hawks
- Runners-up: Hiroshima Toyo Carp
- Finals MVP: Takuya Kai (SoftBank)

NPB seasons
- ← 2017 2019 →

The 2018 Nippon Professional Baseball season was the 69th season since the NPB was reorganized in 1950.

== Regular season standings ==
Central League regular season standings
Pos	Team	G	W	L	T	Pct.	GB	Home	Road
1	Hiroshima Toyo Carp	143	82	59	2	.582	—	45-25–2	37-34–0
2	Tokyo Yakult Swallows	143	75	66	2	.532	7.0	41-30–0	34-36–2
3	Yomiuri Giants	143	67	71	5	.482	13.5	33–38–1	34–33–4
4	Yokohama DeNA BayStars	143	67	74	2	.475	14.0	33–38–1	34–36–1
5	Chunichi Dragons	143	63	78	2	.447	19.0	36–33-2	27–45–0
6	Hanshin Tigers	143	62	79	2	.440	20.0	27–42–2	35–37–0

Pacific League regular season standings
Pos	Team	G	W	L	T	Pct.	GB	Home	Road
1	Saitama Seibu Lions	143	88	53	2	.624	—	45–24–2	43–29–0
2	Fukuoka SoftBank Hawks	143	82	60	1	.577	6.5	40–30–1	42–30–0
3	Hokkaido Nippon-Ham Fighters	143	74	66	3	.529	13.5	40–29–2	34–37–1
4	Orix Buffaloes	143	65	73	5	.471	21.5	33–37–2	32–36–3
5	Chiba Lotte Marines	143	59	81	3	.421	28.5	28–43–1	31–38–2
6	Tohoku Rakuten Golden Eagles	143	58	82	3	.414	29.5	22–50–0	36–32–3

== Interleague results ==
Current as of 25 September 2018

Interleague results are placed in order of current regular season standings. The 'I' column indicates the teams' interleague position.

The interleague results are indicative only of the teams playing ability against those teams in the opposing league, and have no bearing on the placings or Climax Series'. The sponsor, Nippon Life, does hand out awards to players and teams based on their finishing in the Interleague standings, however.

Central League regular season standings
Pos	Team	G	W	L	T	Pct.	I	Home	Road
1	Hiroshima Toyo Carp	18	7	11	0	.389	4	5–4–0	2–7–0
2	Tokyo Yakult Swallows	18	12	6	0	.667	1	6–3–0	6–3–0
3	Yomiuri Giants	18	8	10	0	.444	2	4–5–0	4–5–0
4	Chunichi Dragons	18	7	11	0	.389	4	4–5–0	3–6–0
5	Yokohama DeNA BayStars	18	8	10	0	.444	2	6–3–0	2–7–0
6	Hanshin Tigers	18	6	11	1	.353	6	2–6–1	4–5–0

Pacific League regular season standings
Pos	Team	G	W	L	T	Pct.	I	Home	Road
1	Saitama Seibu Lions	18	10	8	0	.556	4	5–4–0	5–4–0
2	Fukuoka SoftBank Hawks	18	11	7	0	.611	2	6–3–0	5–4–0
3	Hokkaido Nippon-Ham Fighters	18	10	8	0	.556	4	6–3–0	4–5–0
4	Orix Buffaloes	18	11	6	1	.647	1	7–2–0	4–4–1
5	Chiba Lotte Marines	18	11	7	0	.611	2	6–3–0	5–4–0
6	Tohoku Rakuten Golden Eagles	18	6	12	0	.333	6	3–6–0	3–6–0

== Climax Series ==
First stage
Central League
2	Tokyo Yakult Swallows	0
3	Yomiuri Giants	2
Pacific League
2	Fukuoka SoftBank Hawks	2
3	Hokkaido Nippon-Ham Fighters	1

Final stage
1	Hiroshima Toyo Carp	4
3	Yomiuri Giants	0
1	Saitama Seibu Lions	2
2	Fukuoka SoftBank Hawks	4

Japan Series
CL	Hiroshima Toyo Carp	1
PL	Fukuoka SoftBank Hawks	4

=== First stage ===
==== Central League ====
Tokyo Yakult Swallows (0) vs. Yomiuri Giants (2)

Game	Date	Score	Location	Time	Attendance
1	October 13	Yomiuri Giants – 4, Tokyo Yakult Swallows – 1	Meiji Jingu Stadium	3:06	30,735
2	October 14	Yomiuri Giants – 4, Tokyo Yakult Swallows – 0	Meiji Jingu Stadium	2:40	30,798

==== Pacific League ====
Fukuoka SoftBank Hawks (2) vs. Hokkaido Nippon-Ham Fighters (1)

Game	Date	Score	Location	Time	Attendance
1	October 13	Hokkaido Nippon-Ham Fighters – 3, Fukuoka SoftBank Hawks – 8	Fukuoka Yahuoku! Dome	3:35	35,301
2	October 14	Hokkaido Nippon-Ham Fighters – 4, Fukuoka SoftBank Hawks – 2	Fukuoka Yahuoku! Dome	3:32	38,125
3	October 15	Hokkaido Nippon-Ham Fighters – 2, Fukuoka SoftBank Hawks – 5	Fukuoka Yahuoku! Dome	3:46	34,794

=== Final stage ===
==== Central League ====
Hiroshima Carp (4) vs. Yomiuri Giants (0)

Game	Date	Score	Location	Time	Attendance
1	October 17	Yomiuri Giants – 1, Hiroshima Carp – 6	Mazda Stadium	3:07	31,311
2	October 18	Yomiuri Giants – 1, Hiroshima Carp – 4	Mazda Stadium	2:36	31,356
3	October 19	Yomiuri Giants – 1, Hiroshima Carp – 5	Mazda Stadium	3:02	31,371

==== Pacific League ====
Saitama Seibu Lions (2) vs. Fukuoka SoftBank Hawks (4)

Game	Date	Score	Location	Time	Attendance
1	October 17	Fukuoka SoftBank Hawks – 10, Saitama Seibu Lions – 4	MetLife Dome	3:25	31,961
2	October 18	Fukuoka SoftBank Hawks – 5, Saitama Seibu Lions – 13	MetLife Dome	3:30	31,106
3	October 19	Fukuoka SoftBank Hawks – 15, Saitama Seibu Lions – 4	MetLife Dome	3:30	31,238
4	October 20	Fukuoka SoftBank Hawks – 8, Saitama Seibu Lions – 2	MetLife Dome	3:31	32,170
5	October 21	Fukuoka SoftBank Hawks – 6, Saitama Seibu Lions – 5	MetLife Dome	3:26	31,532

== Japan Series ==
SoftBank Hawks won the series, 4–1–1.

Game	Date	Score	Location	Time	Attendance
1	October 27	Fukuoka SoftBank Hawks – 2 @ Hiroshima Toyo Carp – 2 (12)	Mazda Stadium	4:38	30,727
2	October 28	Fukuoka SoftBank Hawks – 1 @ Hiroshima Toyo Carp – 5	Mazda Stadium	2:55	30,724
3	October 30	Hiroshima Toyo Carp – 8 @ Fukuoka SoftBank Hawks – 9	Fukuoka Yahuoku! Dome	3:57	35,746
4	October 31	Hiroshima Toyo Carp – 1 @ Fukuoka SoftBank Hawks – 4	Fukuoka Yahuoku! Dome	3:21	35,796
5	November 1	Hiroshima Toyo Carp – 4 @ Fukuoka SoftBank Hawks – 5 (10)	Fukuoka Yahuoku! Dome	4:25	35,917
6	November 3	Fukuoka SoftBank Hawks – 2 @ Hiroshima Toyo Carp – 0	Mazda Stadium	3:14	30,723

== League leaders ==
=== Central League ===
Batting leaders
Stat	Player	Team	Total
Batting average	Dayan Viciedo	Chunichi Dragons	.348
Home runs	Neftali Soto	Yokohama DeNA BayStars	41
Runs batted in	Wladimir Balentien	Tokyo Yakult Swallows	131
Runs	Tetsuto Yamada	Tokyo Yakult Swallows	130
Hits	Dayan Viciedo	Chunichi Dragons	178
Stolen bases	Tetsuto Yamada	Tokyo Yakult Swallows	33
On Base Percentage	Yoshihiro Maru	Hiroshima Toyo Carp	.468
Slugging Percentage	Neftali Soto	Yokohama DeNA BayStars	.644

Pitching leaders
Stat	Player	Team	Total
Wins	Daichi Osera; Tomoyuki Sugano	Hiroshima Toyo Carp; Yomiuri Giants	15
Earned run average	Tomoyuki Sugano	Yomiuri Giants	2.14
Strikeouts	Tomoyuki Sugano	Yomiuri Giants	200
Innings pitched	Tomoyuki Sugano	Yomiuri Giants	202
Saves	Yasuaki Yamasaki	Yokohama DeNA BayStars	37
Holds	Kazuki Kondo	Tokyo Yakult Swallows	35
Winning percentage	Katsuki Azuma; Kris Johnson	Yokohama DeNA BayStars; Hiroshima Toyo Carp	.688

=== Pacific League ===
Batting leaders
Stat	Player	Team	Total
Batting average	Yuki Yanagita	Fukuoka SoftBank Hawks	.352
Home runs	Hotaka Yamakawa	Saitama Seibu Lions	47
Runs batted in	Hideto Asamura	Saitama Seibu Lions	127
Runs	Hotaka Yamakawa	Saitama Seibu Lions	115
Hits	Shogo Akiyama	Saitama Seibu Lions	195
Stolen bases	Haruki Nishikawa	Hokkaido Nippon-Ham Fighters	44
On Base Percentage	Yuki Yanagita	Fukuoka SoftBank Hawks	.431
Slugging Percentage	Yuki Yanagita	Fukuoka SoftBank Hawks	.661

Pitching leaders
Stat	Player	Team	Total
Wins	Shinsaburo Tawata	Saitama Seibu Lions	16
Earned run average	Takayuki Kishi	Tohoku Rakuten Golden Eagles	2.72
Strikeouts	Takahiro Norimoto	Tohoku Rakuten Golden Eagles	187
Innings pitched	Takahiro Norimoto	Tohoku Rakuten Golden Eagles	180.1
Saves	Yuito Mori	Fukuoka SoftBank Hawks	37
Holds	Naoki Miyanishi	Hokkaido Nippon-Ham Fighters	37
Winning percentage	Yusei Kikuchi	Saitama Seibu Lions	.778

== Attendances ==
#	Team	Average
1	Yomiuri Giants	41,699
2	Hanshin Tigers	40,831
3	Fukuoka SoftBank Hawks	36,149
4	Hiroshima Toyo Carp	31,001
5	Chunichi Dragons	30,231
6	Yokohama DeNA BayStars	28,166
7	Hokkaido Nippon-Ham Fighters	27,731
8	Tokyo Yakult Swallows	27,152
9	Saitama Seibu Lions	24,833
10	Tohoku Rakuten Golden Eagles	23,972
11	Chiba Lotte Marines	23,127
12	ORIX Buffaloes	22,575

== See also ==
- 2018 KBO League season
- 2018 Major League Baseball season
