= Ryūsei Satō =

Japanese baseball player (born 1997)

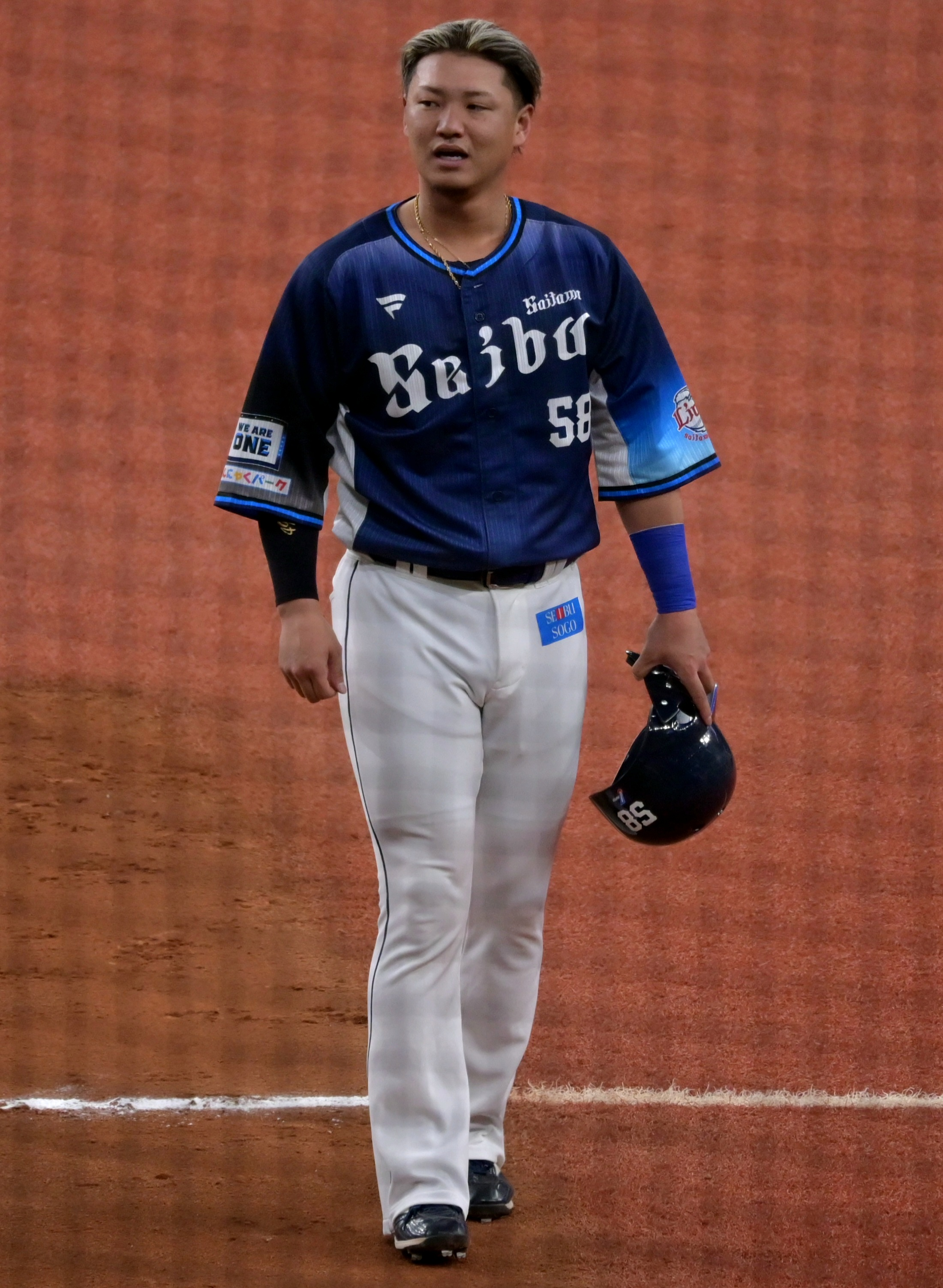

Chunichi Dragons – No. 65
- Infielder
- Born: January 15, 1997 (age 29); Akkeshi, Hokkaido, Japan
- Bats: Right Throws: Right

NPB debut
- March 29, 2019, for the Saitama Seibu Lions

NPB statistics (through July 29, 2025)
- Batting average: .224
- Home runs: 13
- Runs batted in: 70
- Stats at Baseball Reference

Teams
- Saitama Seibu Lions (2019–2021); Hokkaido Nippon-Ham Fighters (2021–2022); Saitama Seibu Lions (2023–2025); Chunichi Dragons (2025–present)

Ryūsei Satō (佐藤 龍世, Satō Ryūsei; born January 15, 1997) is a Japanese professional baseball infielder for the Chunichi Dragons of Nippon Professional Baseball (NPB). He has previously played in NPB for the Saitama Seibu Lions and Hokkaido Nippon-Ham Fighters.

== Career ==
Satō began his Nippon Professional Baseball career in 2019 with the Saitama Seibu Lions. He joined the Hokkaido Nippon-Ham Fighters partway through the 2021 campaign, and remained with the team through the end of the 2022 season, after which he returned to the Lions. In 2025, Satō played in 41 games for Seibu's farm team, batting .324/.402/.483 with four home runs, 16 RBI, and one stolen base.

On June 15, 2025, Satō was traded to the Chunichi Dragons in exchange for cash considerations.
