= 2019 Nippon Professional Baseball season =

70th annual season of Nippon Professional Baseball

2019 NPB season
- League: Nippon Professional Baseball
- Sport: Baseball
- Duration: March 29 – October 23
- Games: 143
- Teams: 12

Central League pennant
- League champions: Yomiuri Giants
- Runners-up: Yokohama DeNA Baystars
- Season MVP: Hayato Sakamoto (Yomiuri)

Pacific League pennant
- League champions: Saitama Seibu Lions
- Runners-up: Fukuoka SoftBank Hawks
- Season MVP: Tomoya Mori (Seibu)

Climax Series
- CL champions: Yomiuri Giants
- CL runners-up: Hanshin Tigers
- PL champions: Fukuoka SoftBank Hawks
- PL runners-up: Saitama Seibu Lions

Japan Series
- Venue: Fukuoka Yafuoku! Dome, Chūō-ku, Fukuoka; Tokyo Dome, Bunkyō, Tokyo
- Champions: Fukuoka SoftBank Hawks
- Runners-up: Yomiuri Giants
- Finals MVP: Yurisbel Gracial (SoftBank)

NPB seasons
- ← 2018 2020 →

The 2019 Nippon Professional Baseball season began on March 29. It was the 70th season since Nippon Professional Baseball (NPB) was reorganized in 1950. There are 12 teams NPB, split evenly between the Central League and Pacific League. The 2019 NPB season was 143 games long; teams in each league played 125 games against each other and 18 interleague games. The regular season was scheduled to end on September 24 except for any make-up games scheduled after it; the regular season eventually concluded on September 30. The top three teams in each league proceed to the Climax Series, NPB's postseason system.

== Regular season standings ==
Central League regular season standings
Rank	Team	G	W	L	T	Pct.	GB	Home	Road
1	Yomiuri Giants	143	77	64	2	.546	-	39–32–0	38–32–2
2	Yokohama DeNA BayStars	143	71	69	3	.519	4.5	42–25–1	26–38–2
3	Hanshin Tigers	143	69	68	6	.504	6.0	39–32–1	30–36–5
4	Hiroshima Toyo Carp	143	70	70	3	.500	6.5	39–31–1	31–39–2
5	Chunichi Dragons	143	68	73	2	.482	9.0	39–31–2	29–42–0
6	Tokyo Yakult Swallows	143	59	82	2	.418	18.0	28–41–2	31-41–0

Pacific League regular season standings
Rank	Team	G	W	L	T	Pct.	GB	Home	Road
1	Saitama Seibu Lions	143	80	62	1	.563	-	43–29–0	37–33–1
2	Fukuoka SoftBank Hawks	143	76	62	5	.551	2.0	42–27–3	34–35-2
3	Tohoku Rakuten Golden Eagles	143	71	68	4	.511	7.5	36–33–2	35–35–2
4	Chiba Lotte Marines	143	69	70	4	.504	9.5	37–32–2	32–38–2
5	Hokkaido Nippon-Ham Fighters	143	65	73	5	.471	12.0	35–34–3	30–39–2
6	Orix Buffaloes	143	61	75	7	.452	14.0	32–34–5	29–41–2

== Climax Series ==
First stage
Central League
2	Yokohama DeNA BayStars	1
3	Hanshin Tigers	2
Pacific League
2	Fukuoka SoftBank Hawks	2
3	Tohoku Rakuten Golden Eagles	1

Final stage
1	Yomiuri Giants	4
3	Hanshin Tigers	1
1	Saitama Seibu Lions	1
2	Fukuoka SoftBank Hawks	4

Japan Series
CL1	Yomiuri Giants	0
PL2	Fukuoka SoftBank Hawks	4

=== First stage ===
==== Central League ====
Hanshin Tigers won the series, 2–1.

Game	Date	Score	Location	Time	Attendance
1	October 5	Hanshin Tigers – 8, Yokohama DeNA BayStars – 7	Yokohama Stadium	3:57	31,832
2	October 6	Hanshin Tigers – 4, Yokohama DeNA BayStars – 6	Yokohama Stadium	3:50	31,818
3	October 7	Hanshin Tigers – 2, Yokohama DeNA BayStars – 1	Yokohama Stadium	3:57	31,807

==== Pacific League ====
Fukuoka Hawks won the series, 2–1.

Game	Date	Score	Location	Time	Attendance
1	October 5	Tohoku Rakuten Golden Eagles – 5, Fukuoka SoftBank Hawks – 3	Fukuoka Yahuoku! Dome	3:15	39,745
2	October 6	Tohoku Rakuten Golden Eagles – 4, Fukuoka SoftBank Hawks – 6	Fukuoka Yahuoku! Dome	3:39	40,178
3	October 7	Tohoku Rakuten Golden Eagles – 1, Fukuoka SoftBank Hawks – 2	Fukuoka Yahuoku! Dome	3:05	38,265

=== Final stage ===
==== Central League ====
Yomiuri Giants won the series, 4–1.

Game	Date	Score	Location	Time	Attendance
1	October 9	Hanshin Tigers – 2, Yomiuri Giants – 5	Tokyo Dome	3:13	45,277
2	October 10	Hanshin Tigers – 0, Yomiuri Giants – 6	Tokyo Dome	2:43	45,168
3	October 11	Hanshin Tigers – 7, Yomiuri Giants – 6	Tokyo Dome	4:52	45,677
4	October 13	Hanshin Tigers – 1, Yomiuri Giants – 4	Tokyo Dome	2:58	45,931

==== Pacific League ====
Fukuoka SoftBank Hawks won the series, 4–1.

Game	Date	Score	Location	Time	Attendance
1	October 9	Fukuoka SoftBank Hawks – 8, Saitama Seibu Lions – 4	MetLife Dome	3:38	29,679
2	October 10	Fukuoka SoftBank Hawks – 8, Saitama Seibu Lions – 6	MetLife Dome	4:26	30,599
3	October 11	Fukuoka SoftBank Hawks – 7, Saitama Seibu Lions – 0	MetLife Dome	3:34	29,828
4	October 13	Fukuoka SoftBank Hawks – 9, Saitama Seibu Lions – 3	MetLife Dome	4:00	29,146

== Japan Series ==
Fukuoka SoftBank Hawks won the series, 4–0.

Game	Date	Score	Location	Time	Attendance
1	October 19	Yomiuri Giants – 2, Fukuoka SoftBank Hawks – 7	Fukuoka Yahuoku! Dome	3:15	37,198
2	October 20	Yomiuri Giants – 3, Fukuoka SoftBank Hawks – 6	Fukuoka Yahuoku! Dome	3:12	37,052
3	October 22	Fukuoka SoftBank Hawks – 6, Yomiuri Giants – 2	Tokyo Dome	3:38	44,411
4	October 23	Fukuoka SoftBank Hawks – 4, Yomiuri Giants – 3	Tokyo Dome	3:22	44,708

== League leaders ==
=== Central League ===
Batting leaders
Stat	Player	Team	Total
Batting average	Seiya Suzuki	Hiroshima Toyo Carp	.335
Home runs	Neftali Soto	Yokohama DeNA BayStars	43
Runs batted in	Neftali Soto	Yokohama DeNA BayStars	108
Runs	Seiya Suzuki	Hiroshima Toyo Carp	112
Hits	Yohei Oshima	Chunichi Dragons	174
Stolen bases	Kōji Chikamoto	Hanshin Tigers	36
On-base percentage	Seiya Suzuki	Hiroshima Toyo Carp	.453
Slugging percentage	Hayato Sakamoto	Yomiuri Giants	.575

Pitching leaders
Stat	Player	Team	Total
Wins	Shun Yamaguchi	Yomiuri Giants	15
Earned run average	Yudai Ono	Chunichi Dragons	2.58
Strikeouts	Shun Yamaguchi	Yomiuri Giants	188
Innings pitched	Yudai Ono	Chunichi Dragons	177.2
Saves	Yasuaki Yamasaki	Yokohama DeNA BayStars	30
Holds	Joely Rodríguez	Chunichi Dragons	41
Winning percentage	Shun Yamaguchi	Yomiuri Giants	.789

=== Pacific League ===
Batting leaders
Stat	Player	Team	Total
Batting average	Tomoya Mori	Saitama Seibu Lions	.329
Home runs	Hotaka Yamakawa	Saitama Seibu Lions	43
Runs batted in	Takeya Nakamura	Saitama Seibu Lions	123
Runs	Shogo Akiyama	Saitama Seibu Lions	112
Hits	Shogo Akiyama	Saitama Seibu Lions	179
Stolen bases	Yuji Kaneko	Saitama Seibu Lions	41
On-base percentage	Kensuke Kondo	Hokkaido Nippon Ham Fighters	.422
Slugging percentage	Tomoya Mori	Saitama Seibu Lions	.547

Pitching leaders
Stat	Player	Team	Total
Wins	Kohei Arihara	Hokkaido Nippon Ham Fighters	15
Earned run average	Yoshinobu Yamamoto	Orix Buffaloes	1.95
Strikeouts	Kodai Senga	Fukuoka SoftBank Hawks	227
Innings pitched	Kodai Senga	Fukuoka SoftBank Hawks	180.1
Saves	Yuki Matsui	Tohoku Rakuten Golden Eagles	38
Holds	Naoki Miyanishi	Hokkaido Nippon Ham Fighters	43
Winning percentage	Taisuke Yamaoka	Orix Buffaloes	.765

== Awards ==
=== Regular season ===
NPB Awards
	Central League		Pacific League	
Award	Player	Team	Player	Team
Rookie of the Year	Munetaka Murakami	Tokyo Yakult Swallows	Rei Takahashi	Fukuoka SoftBank Hawks
Most Valuable Player	Hayato Sakamoto	Yomiuri Giants	Tomoya Mori	Saitama Seibu Lions
Eiji Sawamura Award	Not awarded		Not awarded	
Best Relief Pitcher	Joely Rodríguez	Chunichi Dragons	Naoki Miyanishi	Hokkaido Nippon-Ham Fighters
Matsutaro Shoriki Award			Kimiyasu Kudo	Fukuoka SoftBank Hawks
Best Nine Award
Position	Player	Team	Player	Team
Pitcher	Shun Yamaguchi	Yomiuri Giants	Kodai Senga	Fukuoka SoftBank Hawks
Catcher	Tsubasa Aizawa	Hiroshima Toyo Carp	Tomoya Mori	Saitama Seibu Lions
1st Base	Dayán Viciedo	Chunichi Dragons	Hotaka Yamakawa	Saitama Seibu Lions
2nd Base	Tetsuto Yamada	Tokyo Yakult Swallows	Hideto Asamura	Tohoku Rakuten Golden Eagles
3rd Base	Shuhei Takahashi	Chunichi Dragons	Takeya Nakamura	Saitama Seibu Lions
Shortstop	Hayato Sakamoto	Yomiuri Giants	Sosuke Genda	Saitama Seibu Lions
Outfield	Yoshihiro Maru	Yomiuri Giants	Shogo Akiyama	Saitama Seibu Lions
Outfield	Seiya Suzuki	Hiroshima Toyo Carp	Masataka Yoshida	Orix Buffaloes
Outfield	Neftalí Soto	Yokohama DeNA BayStars	Takashi Ogino	Chiba Lotte Marines
Designated hitter	Not applicable		Alfredo Despaigne	Fukuoka SoftBank Hawks

Mitsui Golden Glove Award
	Central League		Pacific League	
Position	Player	Team	Player	Team
Pitcher	Yuki Nishi	Hanshin Tigers	Kodai Senga	Fukuoka SoftBank Hawks
Catcher	Ryutaro Umeno	Hanshin Tigers	Takuya Kai	Fukuoka SoftBank Hawks
1st Base	José López	Yokohama DeNA BayStars	Seiichi Uchikawa	Fukuoka SoftBank Hawks
2nd Base	Ryosuke Kikuchi	Hiroshima Toyo Carp	Hideto Asamura	Tohoku Rakuten Golden Eagles
3rd Base	Shuhei Takahashi	Chunichi Dragons	Nobuhiro Matsuda	Fukuoka SoftBank Hawks
Shortstop	Hayato Sakamoto	Yomiuri Giants	Sosuke Genda	Saitama Seibu Lions

=== Monthly MVPs ===
Position players
	Central League		Pacific League	
Month	Player	Team	Player	Team
March/April	Hayato Sakamoto	Yomiuri Giants	Hotaka Yamakawa	Saitama Seibu Lions
May	Shuhei Takahashi	Chunichi Dragons	Shogo Akiyama	Saitama Seibu Lions
June	Yoshio Itoi	Hanshin Tigers	Daichi Suzuki	Chiba Lotte Marines
July	José López	Yokohama DeNA BayStars	Masataka Yoshida	Orix Buffaloes
August	Ryoma Nishikawa	Hiroshima Toyo Carp	Tomoya Mori	Saitama Seibu Lions
September	Nobumasa Fukuda	Chunichi Dragons	Masataka Yoshida	Orix Buffaloes

Pitchers
	Central League		Pacific League	
Month	Player	Team	Player	Team
March/April	Shun Yamaguchi	Yomiuri Giants	Kohei Arihara	Hokkaido Nippon-Ham Fighters
May	Shota Imanaga	Yokohama DeNA BayStars	Kodai Senga	Fukuoka SoftBank Hawks
June	Shun Yamaguchi	Yomiuri Giants	Kodai Senga	Fukuoka SoftBank Hawks
July	Yasuaki Yamasaki	Yokohama DeNA BayStars	Taisuke Yamaoka	Orix Buffaloes
August	David Buchanan	Tokyo Yakult Swallows	Alan Busenitz	Tohoku Rakuten Golden Eagles
September	Yuki Nishi	Hanshin Tigers	Zach Neal	Saitama Seibu Lions

== Attendances ==
#	Team	Average
1	Hanshin Tigers	42,935
2	Yomiuri Giants	42,643
3	Fukuoka SoftBank Hawks	36,891
4	Chunichi Dragons	31,741
5	Yokohama DeNA BayStars	31,716
6	Hiroshima Toyo Carp	31,319
7	Tokyo Yakult Swallows	27,543
8	Hokkaido Nippon-Ham Fighters	27,368
9	Tohoku Rakuten Golden Eagles	25,659
10	Saitama Seibu Lions	25,299
11	ORIX Buffaloes	24,423
12	Chiba Lotte Marines	23,463

== See also ==
- 2019 KBO League season
- 2019 Major League Baseball season
