= 2019 Pacific League Climax Series =

Japanese baseball series

First stage
Team (Wins)		Manager	Season
Fukuoka SoftBank Hawks (2)		Kimiyasu Kudo	76–62–5 (.551), 2 GB
Tohoku Rakuten Golden Eagles (1)		Yosuke Hiraishi	71–68–4 (.511), 7½ GB
- Dates: October 5–7

Final stage
Team (Wins)		Manager	Season
Fukuoka SoftBank Hawks (4)		Kimiyasu Kudo	76–62–5 (.551), 2 GB
Saitama Seibu Lions (1)		Hatsuhiko Tsuji	80–62–1 (.563), 2 GA
- Dates: October 9–13
- MVP: Kenta Imamiya (Hawks)

The 2019 Pacific League Climax Series (PLCS) was a post-season Climax Series playoff consisting of two consecutive series that determined which of the three teams who finished in the top three during the 2019 regular season would represent the Pacific League in the Japan Series. The First Stage was a best-of-three series played between the second-place hosts Fukuoka SoftBank Hawks and the third-place Tohoku Rakuten Golden Eagles. The series was played between October 5 to 7. The Hawks defeated the Eagles 2–1 and advanced to the Final Stage to face the pennant-winning Saitama Seibu Lions.

The Final Stage was a best-of-six series hosted by the Lions. Having won the regular season, Seibu was awarded a one-win advantage over the Hawks. The series was played between October 9 to 13. SoftBank swept Seibu 4–1 in four games to advance to the 2019 Japan Series, where they competed against the 2019 Central League Climax Series winner, the Yomiuri Giants.

== First Stage ==
The Fukuoka SoftBank Hawks clinched a postseason berth on September 19, their sixth straight. After failing to overtake the Lions in the final week of the season, the Hawks were ensured home field advantage in the First Stage of the Climax Series. The Tohoku Rakuten Golden Eagles clinched a third-place finish and a spot in the Climax Series on September 24. It was their first postseason appearance in two years. The Hawks were 13–12 against the Eagles during the regular season.

=== Series summary ===
Fukuoka SoftBank Hawks won the series, 2–1.

Game	Date	Score	Location	Time	Attendance
1	October 5	Tohoku Rakuten Golden Eagles – 5, Fukuoka SoftBank Hawks – 3	Yafuoku Dome	3:15	39,745
2	October 6	Tohoku Rakuten Golden Eagles – 4, Fukuoka SoftBank Hawks – 6	Yafuoku Dome	3:39	40,178
3	October 7	Tohoku Rakuten Golden Eagles – 1, Fukuoka SoftBank Hawks – 2	Yafuoku Dome	3:05	38,265

=== Game 1 ===
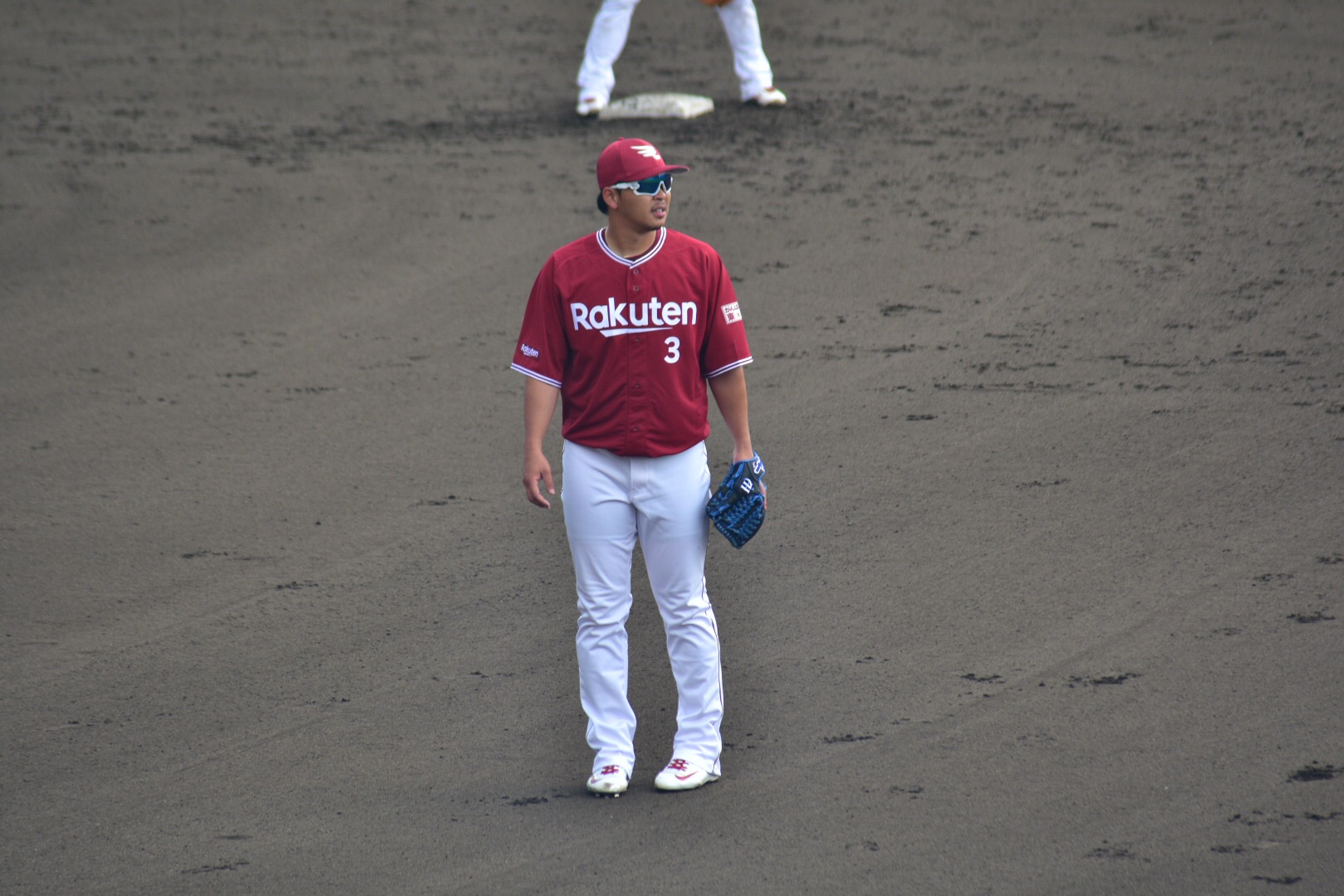
Hideto Asamura hit two solo home runs in the Eagles' Game 1 win.

Saturday, October 5, 2019, 1:00 pm (JST) at Fukuoka Yahuoku! Dome in Fukuoka, Fukuoka Prefecture
Team	1	2	3	4	5	6	7	8	9	R	H	E
Rakuten	1	0	1	0	1	0	1	0	1	5	8	0
SoftBank	1	2	0	0	0	0	0	0	0	3	6	1
WP: Takahiro Norimoto (1–0) LP: Kodai Senga (0–1) Sv: Yuki Matsui (1); Home runs: RAK: Hideto Asamura 2 (2), Louis Okoye (1), Eigoro Mogi (1); SOF: Kenta Imamiya (1), Seiichi Uchikawa (1); Attendance: 39,745

The Eagles quickly took the lead in the top of the first inning with a solo home run by Hideto Asamura off of Hawks' starting pitcher Kodai Senga. SoftBank quickly responded in the bottom of the same inning with a solo home run of their own by Kenta Imamiya off of Eagles' starter Takahiro Norimoto. In the bottom of the next inning, Seiichi Uchikawa's two-run home run gave the Hawks the lead. However, Rakuten continued to score and eventually took the lead after three solo home runs in three separate innings: the third, fifth and seventh. In the top of the ninth inning, Hiroaki Shimauchi walked and then advanced to third base after a wild pitch and a throwing error. Asamura gave the Eagles an insurance run when he singled to drive Shimauchi home, the only run in the game scored via a method other than home run. Eagles closer Yuki Matsui retired all three Hawks' batters in the bottom of the ninth inning to record the save.

=== Game 2 ===
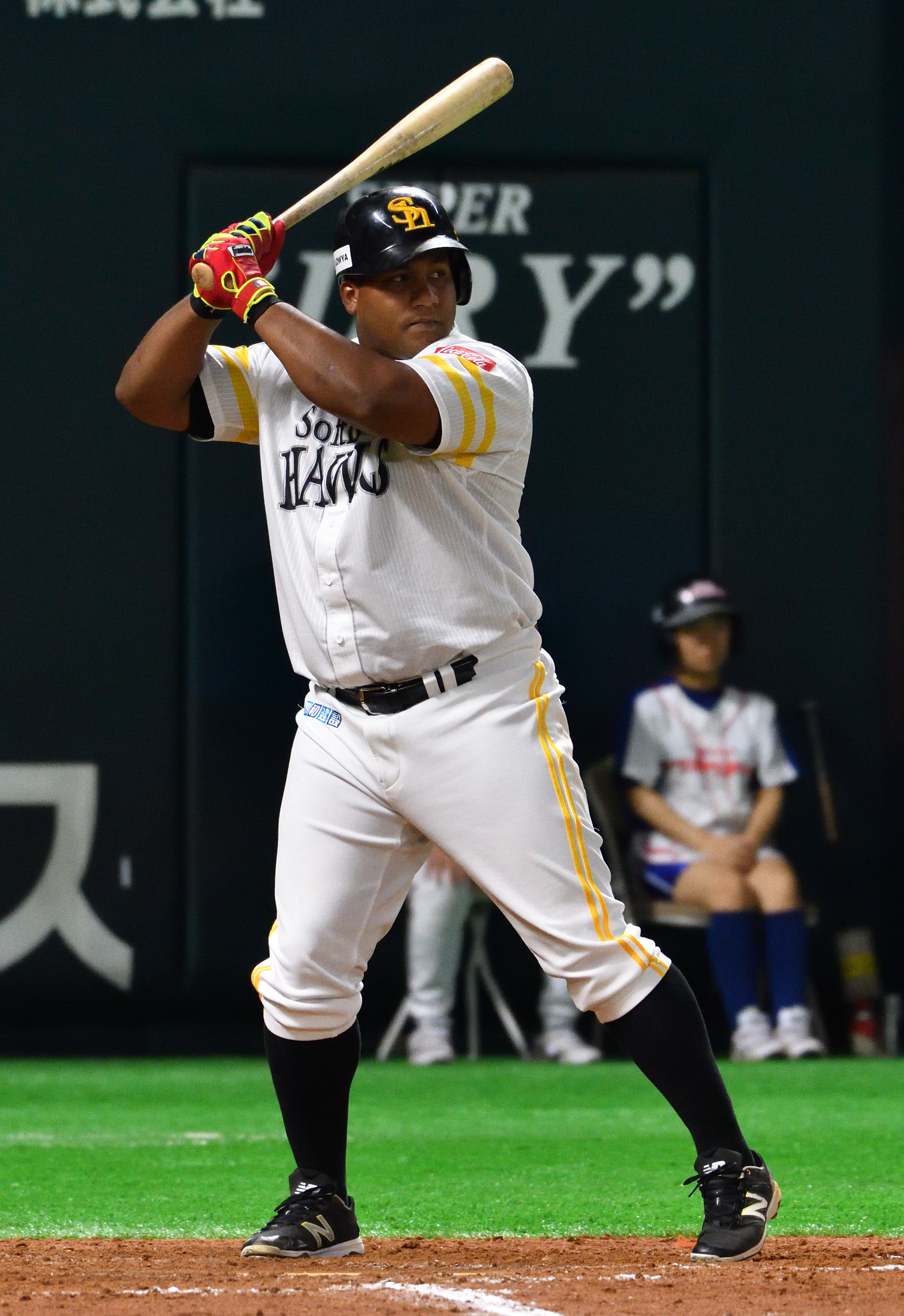
Alfredo Despaigne's three RBIs helped the Hawks win Game 2.

Sunday, October 6, 2019, 1:00 pm (JST) at Fukuoka Yahuoku! Dome in Fukuoka, Fukuoka Prefecture
Team	1	2	3	4	5	6	7	8	9	R	H	E
Rakuten	1	0	1	2	0	0	0	0	0	4	7	0
SoftBank	1	0	3	1	1	0	0	0	0	6	12	0
WP: Shinya Kayama (1–0) LP: Manabu Mima (0–1) Sv: Yuito Mori (1); Home runs: RAK: Hideto Asamura (3); SOF: Yuki Yanagita (1), Alfredo Despaigne (1), Shuhei Fukuda (1); Attendance: 40,178

After the Eagles scored a run in the top of the first inning, the Hawks again followed suit, tying it up in the bottom of the inning via Yuki Yanagita's solo home. In the bottom of the third, Yanagita again tied the game with an RBI double after Asamura hit a solo home run in the bottom of the inning. Alfredo Despaigne' two-run homer later that same inning briefly gave the Hawks the lead. After Hawks starter Rick van den Hurk was removed with two outs in the forth inning, reliever Shinya Kayama walked two batters. Asamura then tied it up by singling in two runs in the fourth, collecting two more RBIs. Shuhei Fukuda broke the 4–4 tie with a solo home run in the bottom of the fourth inning, putting the Hawks ahead for good. They added an insurance run in the fifth when Despaigne singled in Yanagita. The Hawks bullpen kept the Eagles scoreless from the fifth inning on to secure the win.

=== Game 3 ===
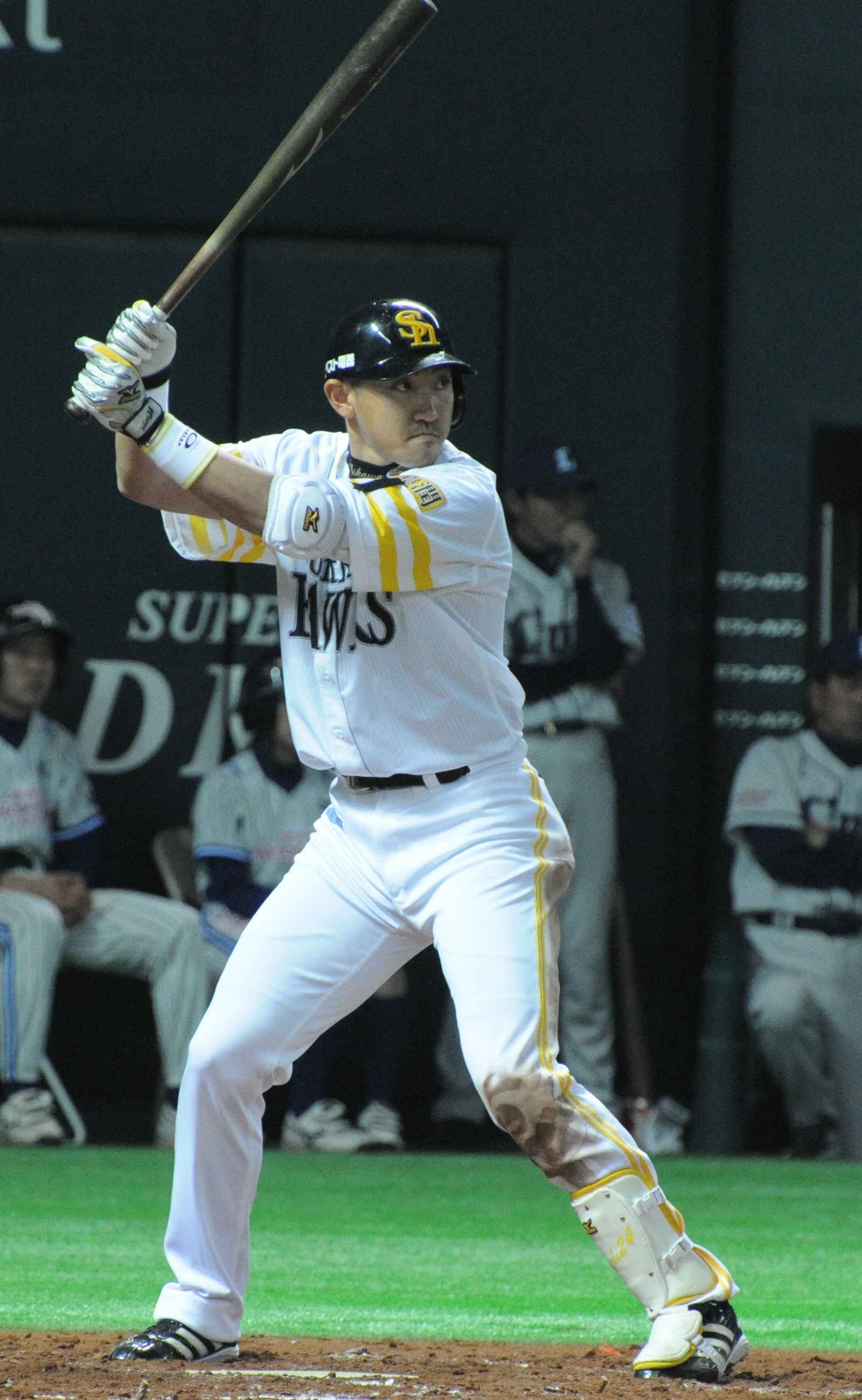
Seiichi Uchikawa drove in all of the Hawks' runs in Game 3.

Monday, October 7, 2019, 6:00 pm (JST) at Fukuoka Yahuoku! Dome in Fukuoka, Fukuoka Prefecture
Team	1	2	3	4	5	6	7	8	9	R	H	E
Rakuten	0	0	0	1	0	0	0	0	0	1	3	0
SoftBank	0	0	0	1	0	0	1	0	X	2	6	0
WP: Hiroshi Kaino (1–0) LP: Sung Chia-hao (0–1) Sv: Yuito Mori (2); Home runs: RAK: Hideto Asamura (4); SOF: Seiichi Uchikawa (2); Attendance: 38,265

Unlike the previous two games in the series, scoring in Game 3 didn't start for either team until the fourth inning. Eagles' and Hawks' starting pitchers Takayuki Kishi and Rei Takahashi, respectively, kept both teams scoreless through the first three innings. Rakuten's Asamura scored the first run of the game with a solo home run in the top of the fourth. He homered in all three games and hit four home runs in total in the series. Kishi had not allowed a hit until giving up back-to-back singles to Despaigne and Yurisbel Gracial in the bottom of the inning. Seiichi Uchikawa then tied the game by driving in a run. The tie continued until the seventh inning, when Uchikawa homered off of Rakuten reliever Sung Chia-hao to give the Hawks the lead. The Hawks couldn't breakthrough in the remaining innings with SoftBank reliever Liván Moinelo and closer Yuito Mori keeping them scoreless to allow the Hawks to win and advance to the Final Stage of the Climax Series.

== Final Stage ==
The Saitama Seibu Lions clinched the Pacific League pennant, their second straight, on September 24. The title also insured that the Lions would be awarded both a one-game and home field advantages in the Final Stage of the Climax Series. At the end of the season, the Lions battled the Fukuoka SoftBank Hawks, who finished the season only two games behind, for the league title. This Final Stage series was a rematch of last year's PLCS Final Stage series in which the Hawks defeated the pennant-winning Lions to advance to the Japan Series. During the regular season, Seibu went 12–13 against the Hawks.

=== Series summary ===
Fukuoka SoftBank Hawks won the series, 4–1*.

Game	Date	Score	Location	Time	Attendance
1	October 9	Fukuoka SoftBank Hawks – 8, Saitama Seibu Lions – 5	MetLife Dome	3:38	29,679
2	October 10	Fukuoka SoftBank Hawks – 8, Saitama Seibu Lions – 6	MetLife Dome	4:26	30,599
3	October 11	Fukuoka SoftBank Hawks – 7, Saitama Seibu Lions – 0	MetLife Dome	3:34	29,828
4	October 13^{†}	Fukuoka SoftBank Hawks – 9, Saitama Seibu Lions – 3	MetLife Dome	4:00	29,146

* The Pacific League regular season champion is given a one-game advantage in the Final Stage.
^{†} This game was originally scheduled to be played on Saturday, October 12, but was postponed one day due to Typhoon Hagibis.

=== Game 1 ===
Wednesday, October 9, 2019, 6:00 pm (JST) at MetLife Dome in Tokorozawa, Saitama Prefecture
Team	1	2	3	4	5	6	7	8	9	R	H	E
SoftBank	2	0	0	0	0	0	1	2	3	8	11	0
Seibu	0	0	3	0	0	1	0	0	0	4	8	0
WP: Hiroshi Kaino (1–0) LP: Katsunori Hirai (0–1); Home runs: SOF: Yurisbel Gracial (1); SEI: None; Attendance: 29,679

=== Game 2 ===
Thursday, October 10, 2019, 6:00 pm (JST) at MetLife Dome in Tokorozawa, Saitama Prefecture
Team	1	2	3	4	5	6	7	8	9	R	H	E
SoftBank	1	1	4	1	0	1	0	0	0	8	13	0
Seibu	0	0	0	1	3	0	1	1	0	6	10	0
WP: Shuta Ishikawa (1–0) LP: Tatsuya Imai (0–1) Sv: Yuito Mori (1); Home runs: SOF: Akira Nakamura (1), Yurisbel Gracial (2); SEI: Shuta Tonosaki (1); Attendance: 30,599

=== Game 3 ===
Friday, October 11, 2019, 6:01 pm (JST) at MetLife Dome in Tokorozawa, Saitama Prefecture
Team	1	2	3	4	5	6	7	8	9	R	H	E
SoftBank	1	2	0	2	0	0	0	0	2	7	14	1
Seibu	0	0	0	0	0	0	0	0	0	0	2	1
WP: Kodai Senga (1–0) LP: Ken Togame (0–1); Home runs: SOF: Taisei Makihara (1); SEI: None; Attendance: 29,828

=== Game 4 ===
Sunday, October 13, 2019, 2:00 pm (JST) at MetLife Dome in Tokorozawa, Saitama Prefecture
Team	1	2	3	4	5	6	7	8	9	R	H	E
SoftBank	0	0	1	2	0	2	2	0	2	9	17	1
Seibu	0	0	0	1	1	1	0	0	0	3	10	2
WP: Jumpei Takahashi (1–0) LP: Keisuke Honda (0–1); Home runs: SOF: Kenta Imamiya 3 (3), Yurisbel Gracial (3); SEI: Ernesto Mejía (1), Hotaka Yamakawa (1); Attendance: 29,146
