= 2018 Pacific League Climax Series =

Japanese baseball series

First stage
Team (Wins)		Manager	Season
Fukuoka SoftBank Hawks (2)		Kimiyasu Kudo	82–60–1 (.577), 6½ GB
Hokkaido Nippon-Ham Fighters (1)		Hideki Kuriyama	74–66–3 (.529), 13½ GB
- Dates: October 13–15

Final stage
Team (Wins)		Manager	Season
Fukuoka SoftBank Hawks (4)		Kimiyasu Kudo	82–60–1 (.577), 6½ GB
Saitama Seibu Lions (2)		Hatsuhiko Tsuji	88–53–2 (.624), 6½ GA
- Dates: October 17–21
- MVP: Yuki Yanagita (Hawks)

The 2018 Pacific League Climax Series (PLCS) consisted of two consecutive series, Stage 1 being a best-of-three series and Stage 2 being a best-of-six with the top seed being awarded a one-win advantage. The winner of the series advanced to the 2018 Japan Series, where they competed against the 2018 Central League Climax Series winner. The top three regular-season finishers played in the two series. The PLCS began on with the first game of Stage 1 on October 13.

== First stage ==
=== Summary ===
Fukuoka SoftBank Hawks won the series, 2–1.

Game	Date	Score	Location	Time	Attendance
1	October 13	Hokkaido Nippon-Ham Fighters – 3, Fukuoka SoftBank Hawks – 8	Yafuoku Dome	3:35	35,301
2	October 14	Hokkaido Nippon-Ham Fighters – 4, Fukuoka SoftBank Hawks – 2	Yafuoku Dome	3:32	38,125
3	October 15	Hokkaido Nippon-Ham Fighters – 2, Fukuoka SoftBank Hawks – 5	Yafuoku Dome	3:46	37,794

=== Game 1 ===
Saturday, October 13, 2018, 1:01 pm (JST) at Fukuoka Yahuoku! Dome in Fukuoka, Fukuoka Prefecture
Team	1	2	3	4	5	6	7	8	9	R	H	E
Nippon-Ham	1	0	0	2	0	0	0	0	0	3	7	0
SoftBank	5	0	2	0	0	1	0	0	X	8	12	0
WP: Shota Takeda (1–0) LP: Naoyuki Uwasawa (0–1); Home runs: NIP: Kensuke Kondo (1); SOF: Alfredo Despaigne (1), Takuya Kai (1); Attendance: 35,301

=== Game 2 ===
Sunday, October 14, 2018, 1:00 pm (JST) at Fukuoka Yahuoku! Dome in Fukuoka, Fukuoka Prefecture
Team	1	2	3	4	5	6	7	8	9	R	H	E
Nippon-Ham	0	0	1	1	0	0	0	2	0	4	7	0
SoftBank	0	0	0	1	0	0	1	0	0	2	6	1
WP: Nick Martinez (1–0) LP: Ren Kajiya (0–1) Sv: Naoya Ishikawa (1); Home runs: NIP: Toshitake Yokoo (1); SOF: Akira Nakamura (1); Attendance: 38,125

=== Game 3 ===
Monday, October 15, 2018, 6:01 pm (JST) at Fukuoka Yahuoku! Dome in Fukuoka, Fukuoka Prefecture
Team	1	2	3	4	5	6	7	8	9	R	H	E
Nippon-Ham	0	1	0	0	0	1	0	0	0	2	8	1
SoftBank	1	0	0	2	0	2	0	0	X	5	12	1
WP: Shuta Ishikawa (1–0) LP: Toshihiro Sugiura (0–1) Sv: Yuito Mori (1); Home runs: NIP: Toshitake Yokoo (2); SOF: Kenji Akashi (1), Alfredo Despaigne 2 (3), Nobuhiro Matsuda (1), Akira Nakamura (2); Attendance: 38,125

== Final stage ==
=== Summary ===
Fukuoka SoftBank Hawks won the series, 4–2*.

Game	Date	Score	Location	Time	Attendance
1	October 17	Fukuoka SoftBank Hawks – 10, Saitama Seibu Lions – 4	MetLife Dome	3:25	31,961
2	October 18	Fukuoka SoftBank Hawks – 5, Saitama Seibu Lions – 13	MetLife Dome	3:30	31,106
3	October 19	Fukuoka SoftBank Hawks – 15, Saitama Seibu Lions – 4	MetLife Dome	3:30	31,238
4	October 20	Fukuoka SoftBank Hawks – 8, Saitama Seibu Lions – 2	MetLife Dome	3:31	32,170
5	October 21	Fukuoka SoftBank Hawks – 6, Saitama Seibu Lions – 5	MetLife Dome	3:26	31,532

* The Pacific League regular season champion is given a one-game advantage in the Final Stage.

=== Game 1 ===
Wednesday, October 17, 2018, 6:01 pm (JST) at MetLife Dome in Tokorozawa, Saitama Prefecture
Team	1	2	3	4	5	6	7	8	9	R	H	E
SoftBank	1	0	0	5	0	1	3	0	0	10	16	1
Seibu	0	0	2	1	0	1	0	0	0	4	8	1
WP: Rick van den Hurk (1–0) LP: Yusei Kikuchi (0–1); Home runs: SOF: None; SEI: Takumi Kuriyama (1), Hotaka Yamakawa (1); Attendance: 31,961

=== Game 2 ===
Thursday, October 18, 2018, 6:00 pm (JST) at MetLife Dome in Tokorozawa, Saitama Prefecture
Team	1	2	3	4	5	6	7	8	9	R	H	E
SoftBank	0	3	2	0	0	0	0	0	0	5	8	1
Seibu	3	4	1	0	0	1	4	0	X	13	11	1
WP: Shinsaburo Tawata (1–0) LP: Ariel Miranda (0–1); Home runs: SOF: None; SEI: Takumi Kuriyama (2), Hideto Asamura (1); Attendance: 31,106

=== Game 3 ===
Friday, October 19, 2018, 6:00 pm (JST) at MetLife Dome in Tokorozawa, Saitama Prefecture
Team	1	2	3	4	5	6	7	8	9	R	H	E
SoftBank	0	0	4	3	5	1	0	0	2	15	16	0
Seibu	0	0	0	1	0	0	2	1	0	4	8	1
WP: Kodai Senga (1–0) LP: Daiki Enokida (0–1); Home runs: SOF: Seiji Uebayashi (1), Seiichi Uchikawa (1); SEI: Hotaka Yamakawa (2), Shuta Tonosaki (1); Attendance: 31,238

=== Game 4 ===
Saturday, October 20, 2018, 2:00 pm (JST) at MetLife Dome in Tokorozawa, Saitama Prefecture
Team	1	2	3	4	5	6	7	8	9	R	H	E
SoftBank	2	2	0	0	0	0	4	0	0	8	11	0
Seibu	0	0	2	0	0	0	0	0	0	2	5	1
WP: Shota Takeda (1–0) LP: Tatsuya Imai (0–1); Home runs: SOF: Yuki Yanagita (1), Takuya Kai (1); SEI: Fumikazu Kimura (1); Attendance: 32,170

=== Game 5 ===
Sunday, October 21, 2018, 1:01 pm (JST) at MetLife Dome in Tokorozawa, Saitama Prefecture
Team	1	2	3	4	5	6	7	8	9	R	H	E
SoftBank	3	0	0	0	0	1	0	2	0	6	12	0
Seibu	0	0	0	0	2	1	0	1	1	5	9	0
WP: Shuta Ishikawa (1–0) LP: Brian Wolfe (0–1) Sv: Yuito Mori (1); Home runs: SOF: Yuki Yanagita (2); SEI: Hideto Asamura (2), Takeya Nakamura (1); Attendance: 32,170
