= Kenta Imamiya =

Japanese baseball player (born 1991)

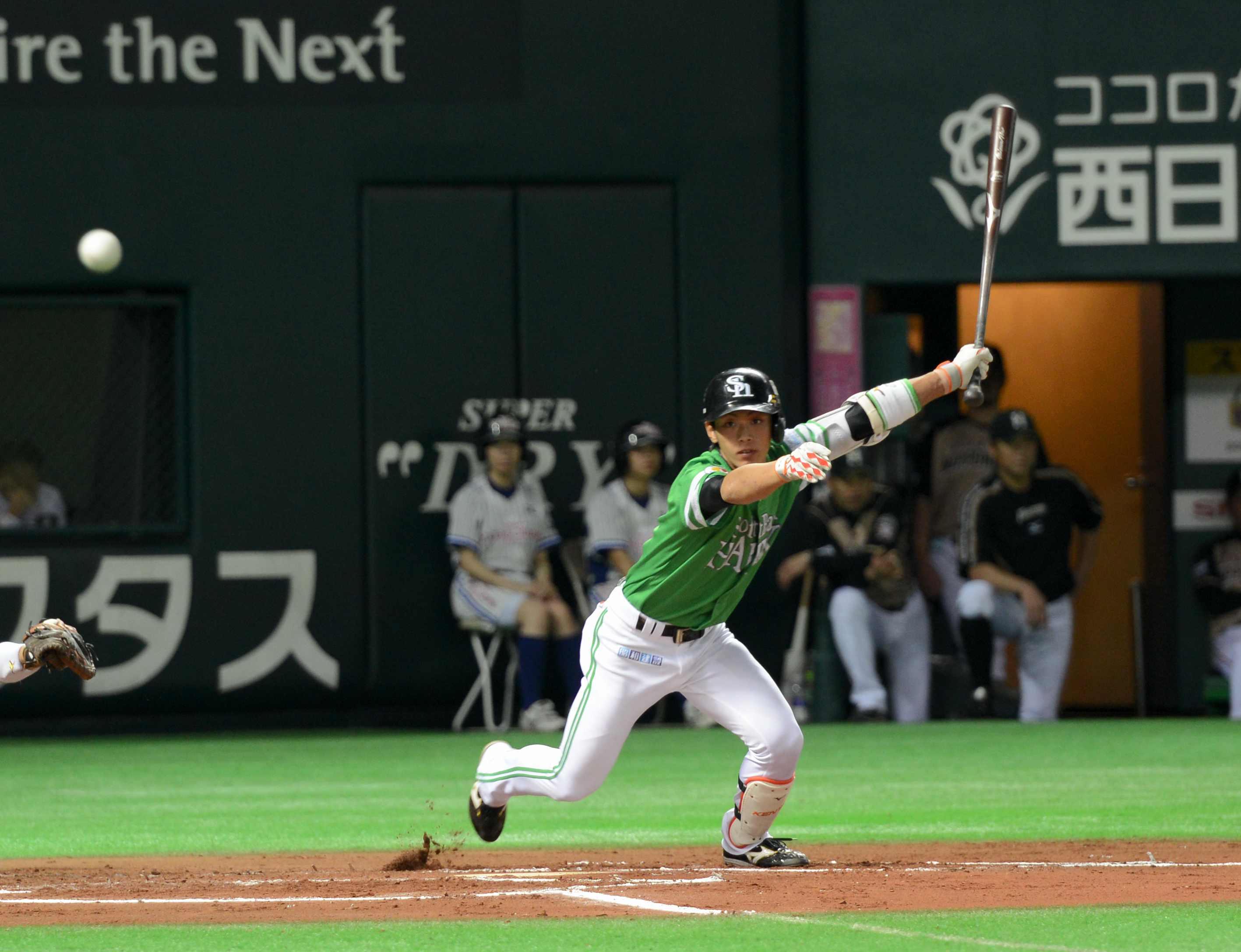
- Imamiya with the Fukuoka SoftBank Hawks.

Fukuoka SoftBank Hawks – No. 6
- Infielder
- Born: July 15, 1991 (age 34)
- Bats: Right Throws: Right

NPB debut
- April 12, 2011, for the Fukuoka SoftBank Hawks

NPB statistics (through 2025 season)
- Batting average: .252
- Hits: 1,412
- Home runs: 100
- Runs batted in: 548
- Stats at Baseball Reference

Teams
- Fukuoka SoftBank Hawks (2010–present)

Career highlights and awards
- 6× NPB All-Star (2014-2017, 2019, 2022); 3× Pacific League Best Nine Award (2014, 2017, 2022); 5× Pacific League Golden Glove Award (2013-2017); 7× Japan Series champion (2011, 2014, 2015, 2017, 2018, 2019, 2025); Pacific League Climax Series MVP (2019)
Medals
Men's baseball
Representing Japan
WBSC Premier12
| Bronze medal – third place | 2015 Tokyo | Team |

Kenta Imamiya (今宮 健太, Imamiya Kenta; born July 15, 1991) is a Japanese professional baseball shortstop for the Fukuoka SoftBank Hawks of Nippon Professional Baseball (NPB). He has also played for the Japan national team.

He is the Pacific League record holder for sacrifice bunts. He is a six-time NPB All-Star and has won seven Japan Series championships with the Hawks.

== Early baseball career ==
Imamiya attended Meiho High School. He played pitcher and shortstop, hitting 62 home runs and throwing as hard as 154 km/h(96 mph). He participated in the 2nd grade spring the 80th Japanese High School Baseball Invitational Tournament, 3rd grade spring the 81st Japanese High School Baseball Invitational Tournament, and 3rd grade summer the 91st Japanese High School Baseball Championship as a third baseman, shortstop and pitcher. He pitched a 154km/h (95.69mph) fastball as a pitcher in the quarterfinals of 91st Japanese High School Baseball Championship against the Hanamaki Higashi High School's Yusei Kikuchi.

== Professional career ==
The Fukuoka SoftBank Hawks drafted him in the first round in the 2009 Nippon Professional Baseball draft.

=== 2010–2015 ===
In 2010 season, Imamiya played in the Western League of NPB's minor leagues.

In 2011 season, Imamiya made his debut with the Pacific League on April 12, 2011, as a defensive sub at 1B. For the year, he played 18 games (11 at first base, 7 not appearing in the field) but only had one at-bat (he was retired). He had two steals and three runs, indicating he pinch-ran at times. And he was selected as the Japan Series roster in the 2011 Japan Series.

After the 2011 NPB season, Imamiya played in the Australian Baseball League for the Brisbane Bandits, and was named to the 2011 Australian Baseball League All-Star Game.

On April 30, 2012, Imamiya hit his first hit in the Pacific League. And he hit his first home run against the Saitama Seibu Lions, on August 4, and also hit a home run on the 5th, recording two days consecutive home runs. In 2012 season, Imamiya finished the regular season in 126 games with a batting average of .238, a two home runs, a RBI of 14, a 8 stolen bases, and a 21 sacrifice bunts.

In 2013 season, Imamiya broke the Pacific League season record with 62 sacrifice bunts. And he recorded in 143 games with a batting average of .253, a 5 home runs, a RBI of 43, and a 10 stolen bases. On November 26, Imamiya was honored for the Mitsui Golden Glove Award at the 2013 Professional Baseball Convention.

On July 18, 2014, Imamiya participated in the MAZADA All-Star Game 2014 for the first time. In 2014 season, Imamiya recorded 62 sacrifice bunts and achieved 60 sacrifice bunts for the first time in NPB history for the second consecutive year. And he recorded in all 144 games with a batting average of .240, a 3 home runs, a RBI of 42, and a 10 stolen bases. In the 2014 Japan Series against the Hanshin Tigers, he recorded his first hit in the Japan Series in Game 1. On November 26, Imamiya was honored the Pacific League Best Nine Award for the first time and the Mitsui Golden Glove Award for the second consecutive year at the NPB Awards 2014.

On July 2, 2015, Imamiya was elected an MAZDA all-star Game 2015. In 2015 season, he finished the regular season in 142 games with a batting average of .228, a 7 home runs, a RBI of 45, a 3 stolen bases, and a 35 sacrifice bunts. In the 2015 Japan Series against the Tokyo Yakult Swallows, he contributed to the team's second consecutive Japan Series champion with a batting average of .278 and one home run. On November 25, Imamiya was honored for the Mitsui Golden Glove Award for the third consecutive year at the NPB Awards 2015.

=== 2016–2020 ===
On June 2, 2016, Imamiya achieved 200 sacrifice bunts, the youngest in NPB's history. In 2016 season, he finished the regular season in 137 games with a batting average of .245, a 10 home runs, a RBI of 56, a 8 stolen bases, and a 38 sacrifice bunts. On October 28, Imamiya underwent surgery on his right elbow. On November 28, Imamiya was honored for the Mitsui Golden Glove Award for the fourth consecutive year at the NPB Awards 2016.

On January 26, 2017, Imamiya declined to participate in the 2017 World Baseball Classic due to rehabilitation of his right elbow. He returned to the team at the start of the 2017 season. On June 26, Imamiya was selected by fan voting for MyNavi All-Star Game 2017, and has participated for the fourth time in a row since 2014. He finished the regular season in 141 games with a batting average of .264, a 14 home runs, a RBI of 64, a 15 stolen bases, and a 52 sacrifice bunts. In the 2017 Japan Series against the Yokohama DeNA BayStars, He contributed to the team's second consecutive Japan Series champion with a good defense of diving catches in Game 4 and three hits and two stolen bases in Game 5. On November 20, Imamiya was honored for the Pacific League Best Nine Award for the second time in three years and the Mitsui Golden Glove Award for the Fifth consecutive year at the NPB Awards 2017.

On June 14, 2018, Imamiya left the team for rehabilitation due to pain in his right elbow. He returned to the team in about a month, but the number of games played was reduced to 99. And he recorded .266 batting average, 11 home runs, 45 RBIs, 5 stolen bases and 22 sacrifice bunts. In the 2018 Japan Series against the Hiroshima Toyo Carp, Imamiya contributed to the team's second consecutive Japan Series champion with a batting average of .357 (5 hits in 14 at bats) in four games.

In 2019 season, Imamiya changed his uniform number from 2 to 6. On June 4, 2019, he achieved 1,000 appearances. In the match against Chiba Lotte Marines on August 8, Imamiya hit a reversal home run with a pinch hitter for the first time. He finished the regular season in 106 games with a batting average of .256, a 14 home runs, a RBI of 41, a 4 stolen bases, and a 7 sacrifice bunts. In the 2019 Pacific League Climax Series against the Saitama Seibu Lions, Imamiya won the Pacific League Climax Series Most valuable player Award with 5 hits and 6 RBIs including 3 home runs in Game 4. In the 2019 Japan Series against the Yomiuri Giants, Imamiya contributed to the team's third consecutive Japan Series champion with a batting average of .313 (5 hits in 16 at bats) in four games.

In the match against the Hokkaido Nippon-Ham Fighters on July 3, 2020, Imamiya achieved the youngest 300 sacrifice bunts in NPB history. On August 22, Imamiya was diagnosed with a muscle injury in his left calf. He spent the rest of his time rehabilitating, reducing his participation in the 2019 season to 43 games.

=== 2021–present ===
On April 8, 2021, Imamiya set a Pacific League record with a total of 306 sacrifice bunts. On October 5, he reached a total of 1,000 hits against the Tohoku Rakuten Golden Eagles. However, he was diagnosed with a bone bruise in the tibia of his left leg, ending his season on October 23. Early in the 2021 season, he played 125 games with rest while both calves were not in perfect condition, but his batting average was his worst at .214. He also hit four home runs and drove in 30 RBI.

In 2022 season, Imamiya has been focusing on hitting compactly, not on hitting home runs, and as a result, he had a .348 batting average in May. However, on May 25, he was removed from the first team registration as a close contact of a COVID-19-positive person according to regulations, and was re-registered on the 31. He returned and recorded a hit in the interleague play on the 31st against the Yomiuri Giants. On July 26, he himself played in his sixth All-Star game, the My navi All-Star Game 2022. He finished the regular season with a .296 batting average, fourth in the league, as well as seven home runs and 47 RBI in 130 games. On November 25, Imamiya won the Pacific League Best Nine Award for the third time in five years and was recognized at the NPB Awards 2022.

On April 12, 2023, Imamiya hit 350 sacrifice bants the fourth players in the NPB history, and the youngest record. He also hit a walk-off double in a game against the Orix Buffaloes on August 31. In 2023 season, he played 126 games, and finished the season with a .255 batting average, a 9 home runs, 24 sacrifice bants, and a 48 RBIs.

== International career ==
In 2013, Imamiya was elected to the Japan national baseball team at the 2013 Baseball Challenge Japan vs. Chinese Taipei.

In 2014, Imamiya was elected to the Japan national baseball team at the 2014 MLB Japan All-Star Series.

On February 16, 2015, Imamiya was elected to the Japan national baseball team at the 2016 Global Baseball Match against a team of European players.

On November 2, 2015, Imamiya was elected to the Japan national baseball team at the 2015 WBSC Premier12.

February 15, 2016, Imamiya was elected to the Japan national baseball team at the 2016 warm-up game against Chinese Taipei.

On March 1, 2018, Imamiya was elected to the Japan national baseball team at the Samurai Japan Series Japan against Australia.
