= Shinya Kayama =

Japanese baseball player (born 1989)

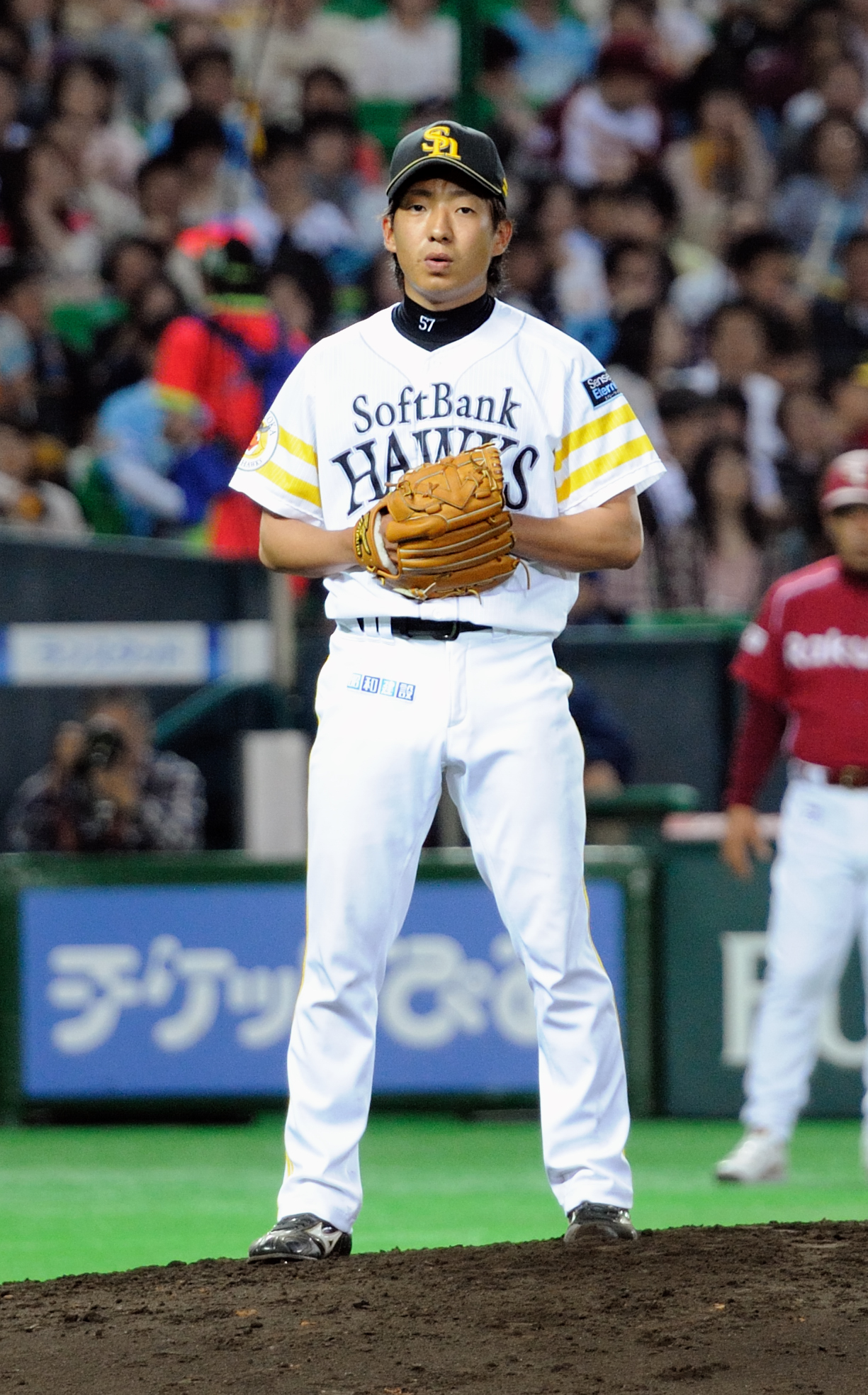
- Kayama in 2012

Free agent
- Pitcher
- Born: November 23, 1989 (age 36); Ishigaki, Okinawa, Japan
- Bats: Left Throws: Left

NPB debut
- May 4, 2012, for the Fukuoka SoftBank Hawks

NPB statistics (through 2024 season)
- Win–loss record: 14–7
- ERA: 3.24
- Strikeouts: 308
- Stats at Baseball Reference

Teams
- Fukuoka SoftBank Hawks (2012–2023); Tokyo Yakult Swallows (2024)

Career highlights and awards
- 6× Japan Series champion (2014–2015, 2017–2020)
Medals
Men's baseball
Representing Japan
WBSC Premier12
Gold medal – first place	2019 Tokyo	Team

Shinya Kayama (嘉弥真 新也, Kayama Shinya; born November 23, 1989) is a Japanese professional baseball pitcher who is a free agent. He has previously played in Nippon Professional Baseball (NPB) for the Fukuoka SoftBank Hawks and Tokyo Yakult Swallows.

== Professional career ==
=== Fukuoka SoftBank Hawks ===
In 2011 Nippon Professional Baseball draft, Fukuoka SoftBank Hawks selected Kayama in the fifth round.

==== 2012–2015 season ====
On Nay 4, 2012, Kayama debuted in the Pacific League against the Tohoku Rakuten Golden Eagles as a relief pitcher. In 2012 season, he pitched in four games in the Pacific League.

In the match against the Chiba Lotte Marines on July 15, 2013, he pitched as a relief pitcher and became his first Winning pitcher. He also recorded his first Hold on August 2. In 2013 season, kayama recorded with a 40 Games pitched, a 3–1 Win–loss record, a 2.32 ERA, a 4 Holds, a 50 strikeouts in 54.1 innings.

In 2014 season, kayama recorded with a 32 Games pitched, a 0–2 Win–loss record, a 3.19 ERA, a one Hold, a 40 strikeouts in 36.2 innings. In the 2014 Japan Series against the Hanshin Tigers, he was selected as the Japan Series roster.

In 2015 season, Kayama recorded with a 16 Games pitched, a 0–0 Win–loss record, a 4.20 ERA, a one Hold, a 14 strikeouts in 15 innings. In the 2015 Japan Series against the Tokyo Yakult Swallows, he was selected as the Japan Series roster.

==== 2016–2020 season ====
In 2016 season, Kayama pitched only five games in the Pacific League. He changed the three-quarter overhand pitching foam to sidearm in the fall training and learned the slow curveball.

In 2017 season, Kayama pitched in relief as a situational lefty, and recorded with a 58 Games pitched, a 2–0 Win–loss record, a 2.76 ERA, a 14 Holds, a 47 strikeouts in 32.2 innings. In the 2017 Japan Series against the Yokohama DeNA BayStars, kayama pitched in relief as a situational lefty and gave him walks in Game 3, but contributed to the team's Japan Series Champion by recording no hits and no runs in Game 1, Game 2, and Game 6.

In 2018 season, Kayama pitched in the best 67 games of his career, and recorded a 2–1 Win–loss record, a 2.45 ERA, a 25 Holds, a 28 strikeouts in 33 innings. In the 2018 Japan Series against the Hiroshima Toyo Carp, he pitched in every game from Game 2 to Game 6, and contributed to the team's second consecutive Japan Series champion with good pitches without any runs.

In the match against the Tokyo Yakult Swallows in the Interleague play on June 18, 2019, he recorded a save for the first time. In 2019 season, Kayama recorded with a 54 Games pitched, a 2–2 Win–loss record, a 2.61 ERA, a 19 Holds, a 26 strikeouts in 31 innings. In the 2019 Japan Series against the Yomiuri Giants, he pitched in Game 4 and contributed to the team's third consecutive Japan Series champion.

In the match against the Orix Buffaloes on September 3, 2020, Kayama has achieved a total of 300 pitches. In 2020 season, he recorded with a 50 Games pitched, a 3–1 Win–loss record, a 2.10 ERA, a 18 Holds, a 33 strikeouts in 30 innings. In the 2020 Japan Series against the Yomiuri Giants, he pitched in Game 2 and Game 4 and contributed to the team's fourth consecutive Japan Series champion with no hits and no runs.

==== 2021 –2023 season ====
On April 23, 2021, Kayama won national free agent rights. He achieved his 100th career Holds on October 5 against the Tohoku Rakuten Golden Eagles. He finished the 2021 season with a 1–0 Win–loss record, a 4.71 ERA, a 19 Holds, and a 27 strikeouts in 28.2 innings, in five straight seasons as a one-point reliever against left-handed batters, pitching in 50 or more games. He signed a two-year contract with the team for an estimated salary of 160 million yen plus incentives without exercising his domestic free agent rights.

kayama continued to serve the team as a one-point reliever during the 2022 season, going scoreless in 21 consecutive games from the opening game until he gave up a goal against the Chunichi Dragons on June 4. He pitched in 58 games, posting a career-best 0.99 ERA and 28 holds, and also finished the season with 22 strikeouts in 27.1 innings pitched.

In 2023 season, Kayama recorded with a 23 Games pitched, a 1–0 Win–loss record, a 5.25 ERA, a 7 Hold, a 7 strikeouts in 12 innings.

On October 22, 2023, the Hawks announced they would release him.

=== Tokyo Yakult Swallows ===
On November 28, 2023, Kayama signed with the Tokyo Yakult Swallows. He made 9 appearances for the Swallows in 2024, struggling to a 14.54 ERA with 4 strikeouts across 4 1/3 innings pitched. Kayama was released by the Swallows on September 30, 2024.

== International career ==
On October 24, 2019, he was selected as the Japan national baseball team in the 2019 WBSC Premier12.
