= Hiroshi Kaino =

Japanese baseball player (born 1996)

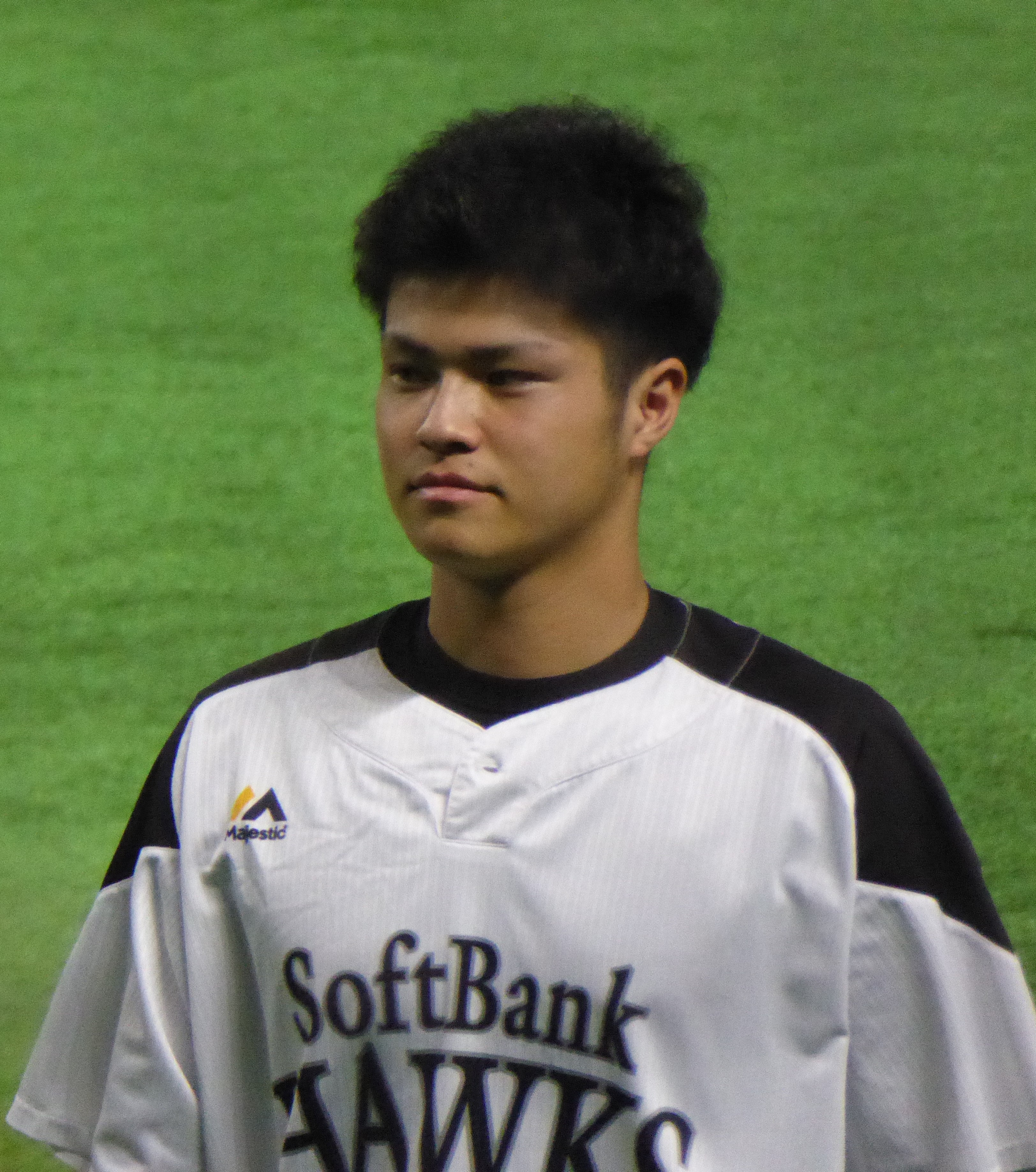
- Kaino with the Fukuoka SoftBank Hawks

Saitama Seibu Lions – No. 34
- Pitcher
- Born: November 16, 1996 (age 29); Nishiwaki, Hyōgo, Japan
- Bats: Left Throws: Right

NPB debut
- March 29, 2019, for the Fukuoka SoftBank Hawks

NPB statistics (through 2025 season)
- Win–loss record: 9–13
- Earned run average: 3.19
- Strikeouts: 215
- Saves: 11
- Holds: 85
- Stats at Baseball Reference

Teams
- Fukuoka SoftBank Hawks (2019–2023); Saitama Seibu Lions (2024–present)

Career highlights and awards
- Japan Series champion (2019); NPB All-Star (2025)
Medals
Men's baseball
Representing Japan
WBSC Premier12
Gold medal – first place	2019 Tokyo	Team
Haarlem Baseball Week
Gold medal – first place	2018 Haarlem, Netherlands	Team

Hiroshi Kaino (甲斐野 央, Kaino Hiroshi; born November 16, 1996) is a Japanese professional baseball pitcher for the Saitama Seibu Lions of Nippon Professional Baseball.

== Career ==
On October 25, 2018, Kaino was drafted by the Fukuoka SoftBank Hawks first overall pick in the 2018 Nippon Professional Baseball draft.

On March 29, 2019, kaino pitched his debut game against the Saitama Seibu Lions as a relief pitcher, and won the game for the first time in the Pacific League. In 2019, the rookie year, he finished the regular season with a 2–5 Win–loss record, a 4.14 ERA, 73 strikeouts in 58 2/3 innings, 26 Holds, and 8 saves. And he pitched as a Setup man against the Yomiuri Giants in the 2019 Japan Series.

In 2020, Kaino hurt his right elbow in spring training and spent the season rehabilitating his right elbow. And he had surgery on his right elbow on December 4.

In 2021 season, Kaino spent the first half of the season in rehabilitation, but on August 15, against the Hokkaido Nippon-Ham Fighters, he pitched for the first time in 662 days in the Pacific League. He recorded with a 22 Games pitched, a 0–2 Win–loss record, a 4.35 ERA, a 4 Holds, a one saves. and a 25 strikeouts in 20.2 innings.

In 2022 season, he finished the regular season with a 27 Games pitched, a 2–0 Win–loss record, a 2.52 ERA, a 3 Holds, and a 27 strikeouts in 25 innings.

On July 1, 2023, Kaino pitched as a closer against the Saitama Seibu Lions and recorded a save for the first time in two years. In 2023 season, he finished the regular season with a 46 Games pitched, a 3-1 Win–loss record, a 2.53 ERA, a 8 holds, a 2 saves, and a 39 strikeouts in 42.2 innings.

On January 11, 2024, Kaino transferred to the Saitama Seibu Lions to compensate for Hotaka Yamakawa go to the Fukuoka SoftBank Hawks via free agent.

== International career ==
Kaino represented the Japan national baseball team at the 2018 USA VS Japan Collegiate All-Star Series, 2018 Haarlem Baseball Week and 2019 WBSC Premier12.

During Toyo University era, Kaino was selected as the Japan for the 2018 USA VS Japan Collegiate All-Star Series and 2018 Haarlem Baseball Week.

On October 24, 2019, he was selected as the Japan national baseball team in the 2019 WBSC Premier12.
