= Yurisbel Gracial =

Cuban baseball player (born 1985)

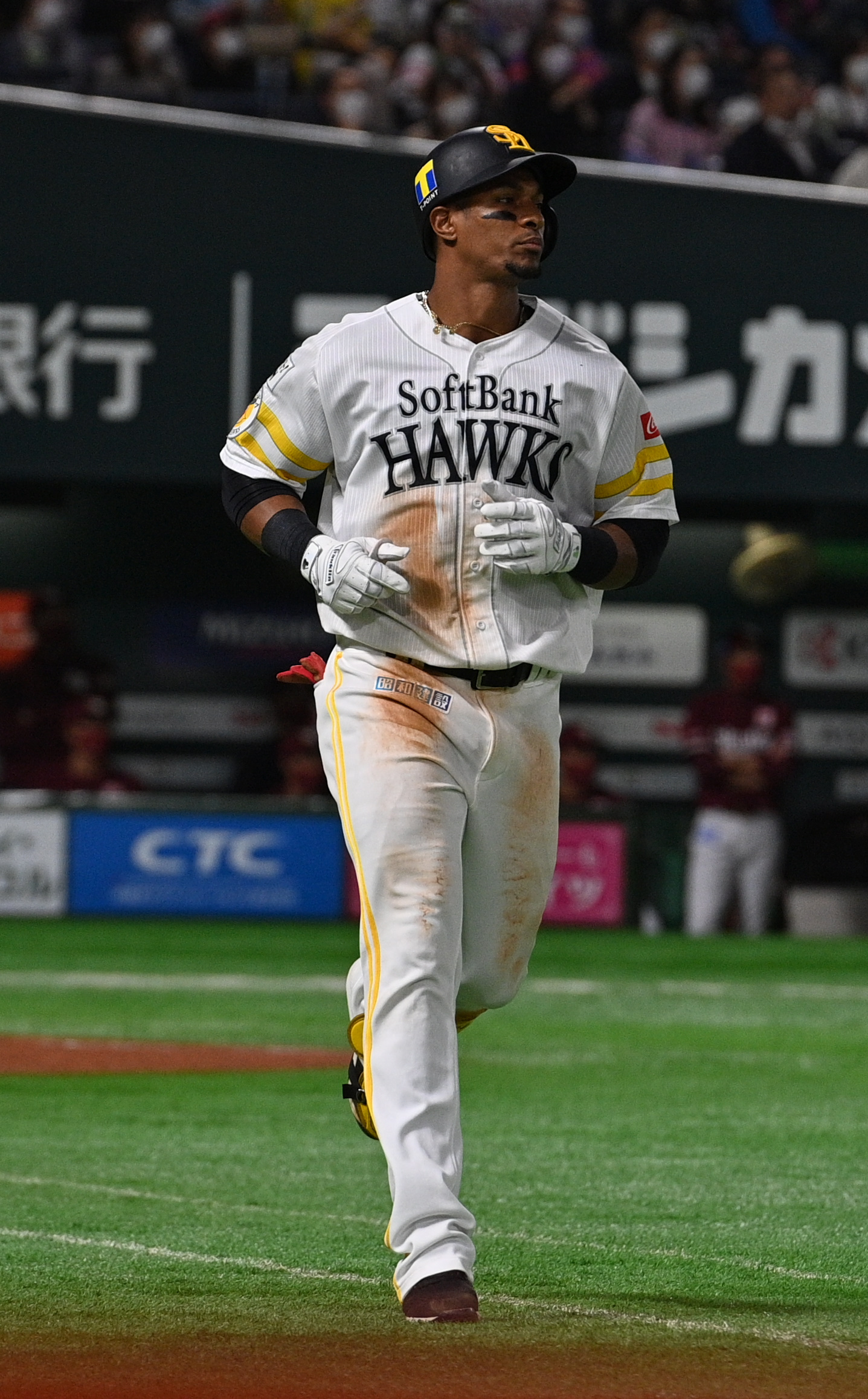
- Gracial Garcia with the Fukuoka SoftBank Hawks

Conspiradores de Querétaro – No. 47
- Third baseman
- Born: 14 October 1985 (age 40); Guantánamo, Cuba
- Bats: Right Throws: Right

NPB debut
- April 19, 2018, for the Fukuoka SoftBank Hawks

NPB statistics (through 2022 season)
- Batting average: .293
- Home runs: 59
- Runs batted in: 178
- Stats at Baseball Reference

Teams
- Fukuoka SoftBank Hawks (2018–2022)

Career highlights and awards
- 3× Japan Series champion (2018–2020); 2019 Japan Series MVP; 2× NPB All-Star (2019, 2022)
Medals
Men's baseball
Representing Cuba
Central American and Caribbean Games
Silver medal – second place	2018 Barranquilla	Team
Silver medal – second place	2023 San Salvador	Team
Caribbean Cup
Gold medal – first place	2023 Puerto Rico	Team

Yurisbel Gracial Garcia (born October 14, 1985) is a Cuban professional baseball third baseman for the Conspiradores de Querétaro of the Mexican League. He has previously played in Nippon Professional Baseball (NPB) for the Fukuoka SoftBank Hawks.

== Career ==
=== Québec Capitales ===
Gracial served in the Cuban military before playing for Matanzas in the Cuban National Series. In 2016, Gracial played for the Québec Capitales of the Canadian American Association of Professional Baseball, slashing .320/.376/.476 with 9 home runs and 58 RBI. He signed back with the club in 2017, and batted .333/.399/.524 with 13 home runs and 65 RBI. Gracial was released by Québec prior to the 2018 season.

=== Fukuoka SoftBank Hawks ===
On February 13, 2018, Gracial signed with the Fukuoka SoftBank Hawks of Nippon Professional Baseball's Pacific League. In 2018, he finished the regular season playing in 54 games and logging a batting average of .292, 9 home runs, and 30 RBI. He additionally participated in the 2018 Japan Series.

Gracial re-signed with the Hawks for the 2019 season. He went 6-for-16 (.375) with three home runs and six RBI in the 2019 Japan Series and won the Japan Series Most Valuable Player Award. Gracial finished the regular season playing in 103 games, with a batting average of .319, 28 home runs, and 68 RBI.

On January 22, 2020, Gracial signed a two-year contract extension with Fukuoka. However, due to the influence of the COVID-19 pandemic, he was unable to leave Cuba and was not able to come to Japan until July 19. In 2020, Gracial finished the year playing in 69 games and recording a batting average of .277, 10 home runs and 35 RBI. In the 2020 Japan Series against the Yomiuri Giants, Gracial contributed to the team's fourth consecutive Japan Series victory with two hits in Game 1, a home run in Game 2, and an RBI hit in Game 3.

In 2021, Gracial had been hitting well with a .305 batting average, five home runs, and 15 RBI, but on May 8, while reaching base as a runner against the Saitama Seibu Lions, he made contact with second baseman Nien-Ting Wu, breaking the ring finger on his right hand and making a long rehabilitation period inevitable. He ended up finishing the season as he did, playing only 37 games.

In 2022 season, Gracial had been in the starting lineup for all of the opening games but was benched on June 25 due to a sore left wrist. On June 27, he tested positive for COVID-19 and was removed from the first team registration according to regulations. On July 20, he was re-registered and played a pinch-hitter against the Tohoku Rakuten Golden Eagles. On July 27, Gracial played in his second career All-Star game. He finished the regular season with a .271 batting average, seven home runs, and 30 RBI across 99 games, due in part to his removal from the first team registration because of COVID-19. He became a free agent after the 2022 season.

=== Conspiradores de Querétaro ===
On February 5, 2024, Gracial signed with the Conspiradores de Querétaro of the Mexican League. In 87 appearances for Querétaro, he slashed .382/.437/.670 with 24 home runs and 83 RBI.

In 2025, Gracial returned for a second season with Querétaro. In 63 games he hit .348/.431/.567 with 15 home runs and 49 RBIs.

== International career ==
In 2017, Gracial was elected to the Cuba national baseball team at the 2017 World Baseball Classic.

In 2019, Gracial was elected to the Cuba national baseball team at the 2019 WBSC Premier12.
