= Yoshiyuki Kamei (baseball) =

Japanese baseball player

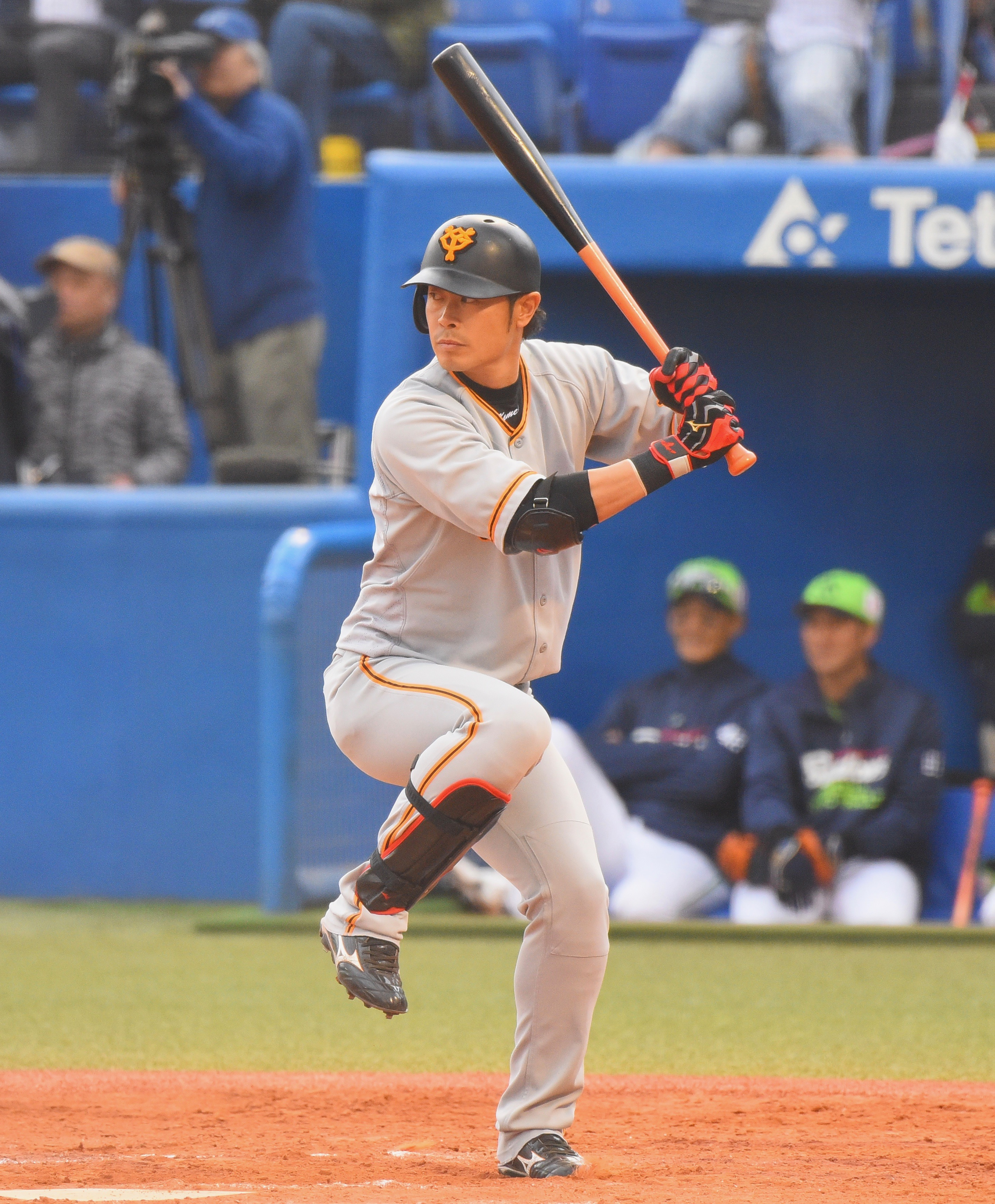
- Kamei with the Yomiuri Giants

Yomiuri Giants – No. 79
- Outfielder / Coach
- Born: July 28, 1982 (age 44); Yamatokōriyama, Nara, Japan
- Batted: Left Threw: Right

NPB debut
- July 9, 2005, for the Yomiuri Giants

Last NPB appearance
- November 12, 2021, for the Yomiuri Giants

NPB statistics (through 2021 season)
- Batting average: .257
- Home runs: 101
- Hits: 1,069
- RBI: 462
- Stolen bases: 61
- Stats at Baseball Reference

Teams
- As player: Yomiuri Giants (2005–2021); As coach: Yomiuri Giants (2022–present)

Career highlights and awards
- 2× Japan Series champion (2009, 2012); 2019 Fighting Spirit Award
Medals
Representing Japan
Men's baseball
World Baseball Classic
Gold medal – first place	2009 Los Angeles	Team

Yoshiyuki Kamei (亀井 善行, Kamei Yoshiyuki; born July 28, 1982 in Yamatokōriyama, Nara, Japan) is a Japanese professional baseball player for the Yomiuri Giants in Japan's Nippon Professional Baseball.

He was selected Japan national baseball team at the 2009 World Baseball Classic.

During a brief stint in the 2010–11 Australian Baseball League season he played for the Melbourne Aces and although he did not qualify for any statistical leaders, he has the highest single season slugging (.859) and OPS (1.359) for any player with more than 50 at-bats (64).

On November 16, 2018, he was selected Yomiuri Giants roster at the 2018 MLB Japan All-Star Series exhibition game against MLB All-Stars.
