= 2019 Japan Series =

70th edition of Nippon Professional Baseball's championship series

Team (Wins)	Managers	Season
Fukuoka SoftBank Hawks (4)	Kimiyasu Kudo	76–62–5 (.551)
Yomiuri Giants (0)	Tatsunori Hara	77–64–2 (.546)
- Dates: October 19–23
- MVP: Yurisbel Gracial (Fukuoka)
- FSA: Yoshiyuki Kamei (Yomiuri)

Broadcast
- Television: Fuji TV (Game 1); NHK-BS1 (Games 1–3); TBS (Game 2); NTV (Games 3–4)

The 2019 Japan Series (known as the SMBC Nippon Series 2019 for sponsorship reasons) was the championship series of Nippon Professional Baseball (NPB) for the 2019 season. The 70th edition of the Japan Series, it was played from 19-23 October. The series was a best-of-seven playoff between the Fukuoka SoftBank Hawks, the Pacific League's (PL) Climax Series champion and defending Japan Series champions, and the Yomiuri Giants, the Central League's (CL) Climax Series champion. The Hawks defeated the Giants in a four game sweep to win their third consecutive Japan Series championship, their fifth title in six years; they are also the first team to win three straight Japan Series titles since the Seibu Lions did it from 1990 to 1992.

The Hawks finished the 2019 regular season in second place in the Pacific League. They advanced to the Japan Series after defeating the Tohoku Rakuten Golden Eagles and the Saitama Seibu Lions in the PL Climax Series. The Giants finished in first place in the Central League, earning a bye in the first stage of the CL Climax Series, followed by a victory over the Hanshin Tigers to reach the Japan Series.

Mirroring the 1959 Japan Series in which the Nankai Hawks beat Yomiuri in four games to capture their first Japan Series championship, SoftBank beat Yomiuri in four games to capture the franchise's tenth Japan Series championship. This marked the sixth time the Japan Series ended in a sweep, with the most recent being in 2005. The first two games were played at the Fukuoka Yafuoku! Dome and the other two at the Tokyo Dome. Yurisbel Gracial was given the Japan Series Most Valuable Player Award and Yoshiyuki Kamei was awarded with the Fighting Spirit Award.

== Climax Series ==
For the second year in a row, the Fukuoka SoftBank Hawks finished the 2019 regular season in second place in the Pacific League (PL) behind the Saitama Seibu Lions, securing them a place as host team for the First Stage of the Climax Series, a best-of-three series against the Tohoku Rakuten Golden Eagles. After defeating the Eagles 2–1, SoftBank advanced to the Final Stage, where they competed against the pennant winning Lions. The series was best-of-six and the Lions were awarded a one-win advantage as well as home field advantage for the entire series. For the second time in as many years, the Hawks went into the MetLife Dome and overcame the Lions' one-win advantage, defeating the Lions in four games to advance to their third consecutive Japan Series, as well as their fifth in the past six seasons.

For the first time since 2014, the Yomiuri Giants finished with the best record in the Central League, giving them a First Stage bye and advancing them directly to the Final Stage. They defeated the third place Hanshin Tigers 4–1, securing them a place in the Japan Series for the first time since 2013.

First Stage
Central League
2	Yokohama DeNA BayStars	1
3	Hanshin Tigers	2
Pacific League
2	Fukuoka SoftBank Hawks	2
3	Tohoku Rakuten Golden Eagles	1

Final Stage
1	Yomiuri Giants	4
3	Hanshin Tigers	1
1	Saitama Seibu Lions	1
2	Fukuoka SoftBank Hawks	4

Japan Series
CL1	Yomiuri Giants	0
PL2	Fukuoka SoftBank Hawks	4

== Series notes ==
2019 Japan Series managers

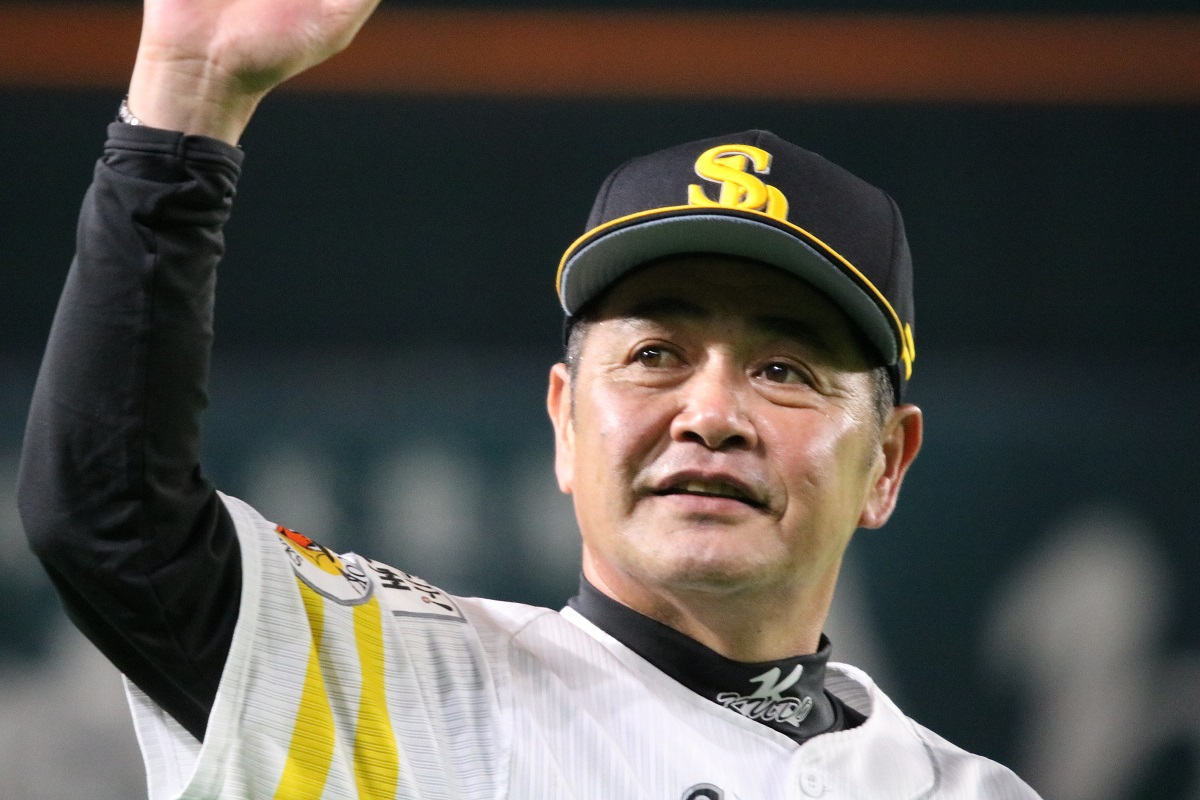
Kimiyasu Kudo

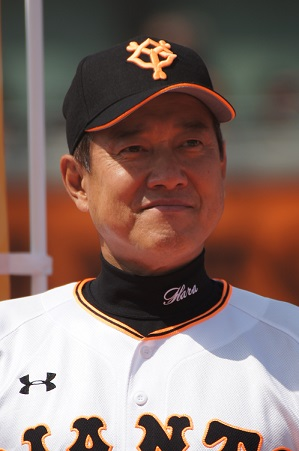
Tatsunori Hara

A Japanese baseball dynasty of the 2010s, the Fukuoka SoftBank Hawks had won the previous two Japan Series and four in the last five years. The Yomiuri Giants had won 22 Japan Series championships, more than any other team in the Nippon Professional Baseball (NPB). The last time the Giants won the championship was in the 2012 Japan Series, which was also the last time a Central League team had won the Japan Series. The Giants and the Hawks last played against each other in the Japan Series in 2000, when the Giants defeated the Hawks in six games. Kimiyasu Kudo, the Hawks manager in 2019, had pitched for the Giants in the 2000 series and Tatsunori Hara was Giants manager both times. A week before the post-season began, Yomiuri catcher Shinnosuke Abe announced that he would be retiring at the end of the season after 19 years with the Giants. Abe has been described as one of the greatest catchers to have played in the NPB.

Home field advantage for the Japan Series alternates between the Pacific and Central leagues every year. For this series, it was the PL's turn to receive the advantage so it was awarded to the Hawks. SoftBank beat Yomiuri 2–1 in their only interleague series during the 2019 regular season. For the sixth year in a row, Sumitomo Mitsui Banking Corporation (SMBC) sponsored the naming rights for the Japan Series, so it was officially known as the "2019 SMBC Japan Series".

== Series overview ==
Fukuoka SoftBank Hawks won the series, 4–0.

Game	Date	Score	Location	Time	Attendance
1	October 19	Yomiuri Giants – 2, Fukuoka SoftBank Hawks – 7	Fukuoka Yahuoku! Dome	3:15	37,194
2	October 20	Yomiuri Giants – 3, Fukuoka SoftBank Hawks – 6	Fukuoka Yahuoku! Dome	3:12	37,052
3	October 22	Fukuoka SoftBank Hawks – 6, Yomiuri Giants – 2	Tokyo Dome	3:38	44,411
4	October 23	Fukuoka SoftBank Hawks – 4, Yomiuri Giants – 3	Tokyo Dome	3:22	44,708

== Game summaries ==
=== Game 1 ===
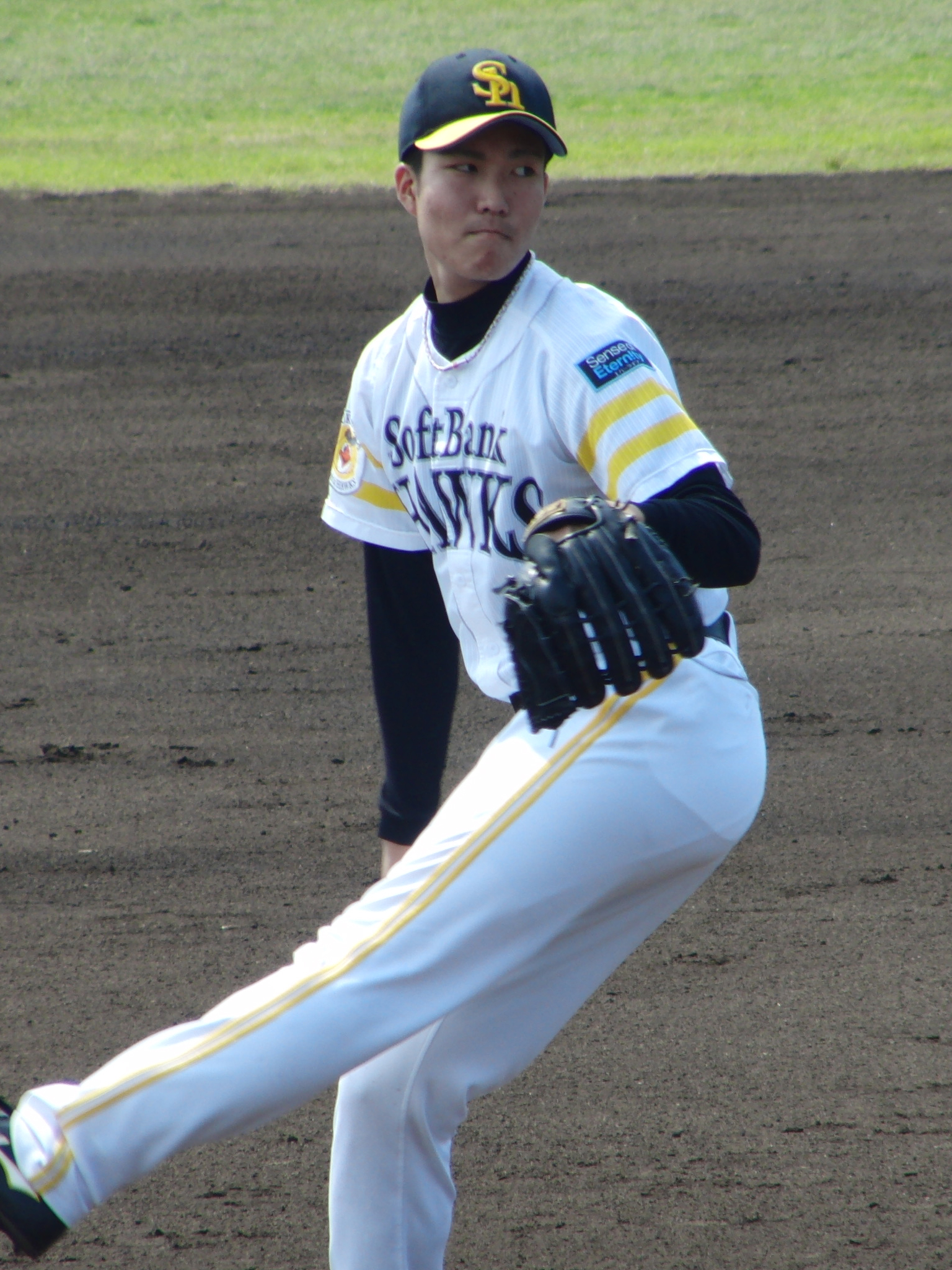
Hawks starting pitcher Kodai Senga allowed only one run in a Game 1 win.

Saturday, October 19, 2019, 6:34 pm (JST) at Fukuoka Yahuoku! Dome in Fukuoka, Fukuoka Prefecture
Team	1	2	3	4	5	6	7	8	9	R	H	E
Yomiuri	0	1	0	0	0	0	0	0	1	2	6	0
SoftBank	0	2	0	0	0	1	4	0	X	7	10	1
WP: Kodai Senga (1–0) LP: Shun Yamaguchi (0–1); Home runs: YOM: Shinnosuke Abe (1), Takumi Ohshiro (1); SBH: Yurisbel Gracial (1); Attendance: 37,194; Boxscore

In Game 1, the starting pitchers for the Fukuoka SoftBank Hawks and Yomiuri Giants were Kodai Senga and Shun Yamaguchi, respectively. It was Senga's third straight year starting Game 1 of the Japan Series and it was Yamaguchi's first Japan Series start. Both starting pitchers were Eiji Sawamura Award candidates during the regular season. Senga allowed a home run to Shinnosuke Abe in the top of the second inning, but Yurisbel Gracial hit a two-run home run n the bottom of the second inning. Senga allowed only the one run in seven innings. Meanwhile, SoftBank scored a third run in the sixth inning with a run batted in (RBI) sacrifice fly by Akira Nakamura, and scored four runs in the seventh inning with a two-RBI single by Taisei Makihara, an RBI single by Yuki Yanagita, and an RBI ground out by Shuhei Fukuda. Takumi Ohshiro hit a solo home run for the Giants in the ninth inning to complete the game's scoring.

=== Game 2 ===
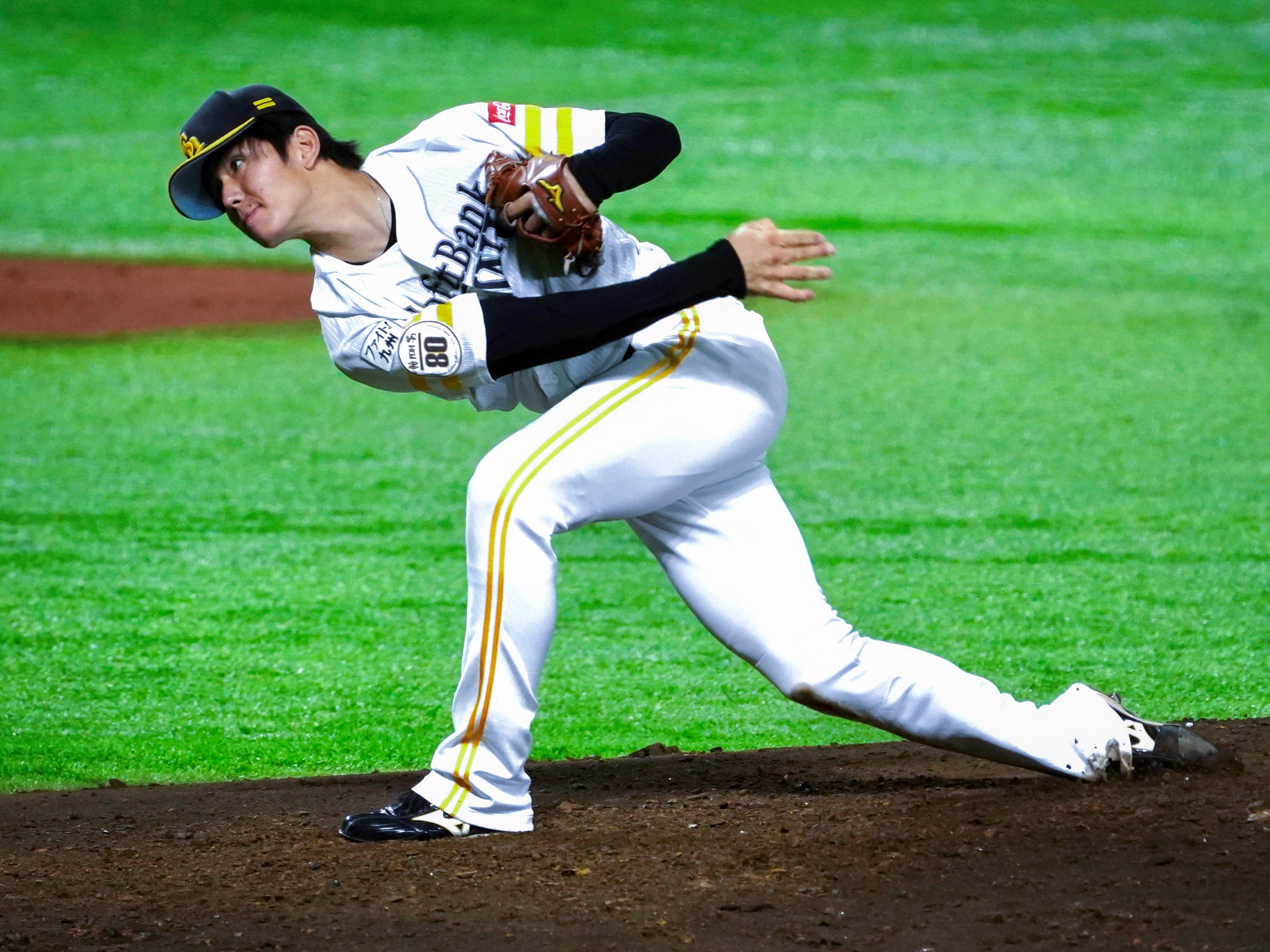
SoftBank's Rei Takahashi did not allow a hit to Yomiuri into the seventh inning in Game 2.

Sunday, October 20, 2019, 6:31 pm (JST) at Fukuoka Yahuoku! Dome in Fukuoka, Fukuoka Prefecture
Team	1	2	3	4	5	6	7	8	9	R	H	E
Yomiuri	0	0	0	0	0	0	0	0	3	3	4	1
SoftBank	0	0	0	0	0	0	3	3	X	6	7	0
WP: Rei Takahashi (1–0) LP: Kan Otake (0–1); Home runs: YOM: None; SBH: Nobuhiro Matsuda (1), Yuki Yanagita (1), Shuhei Fukuda (1); Attendance: 37,052; Boxscore

Rei Takahashi started Game 2 for SoftBank, and did not allow a hit into the seventh inning. C.C. Mercedes, the starting pitcher for Yomiuri, also allowed one hit to SoftBank in six innings. With Kan Otake pitching for the Giants in the seventh inning, an error then a single allowed two players to reach base. SoftBank then scored the game's first runs on a three-run home run by Nobuhiro Matsuda. SoftBank added three more runs in the bottom of the eighth inning on a solo home run by Yuki Yanagita and a two-run home run by Shuhei Fukuda. In the ninth inning, SoftBank's Jumpei Takahashi recorded one out but walked the bases loaded. Yuito Mori, their closer, entered the game and Kazuma Okamoto drove in two runs, but was tagged out running the bases. Abe singled for the Giants to close the score to 6–3, but Mori retired the next batter, ending the game. With the win, SoftBank extended their championship finals series home winning streak to fourteen.

=== Game 3 ===
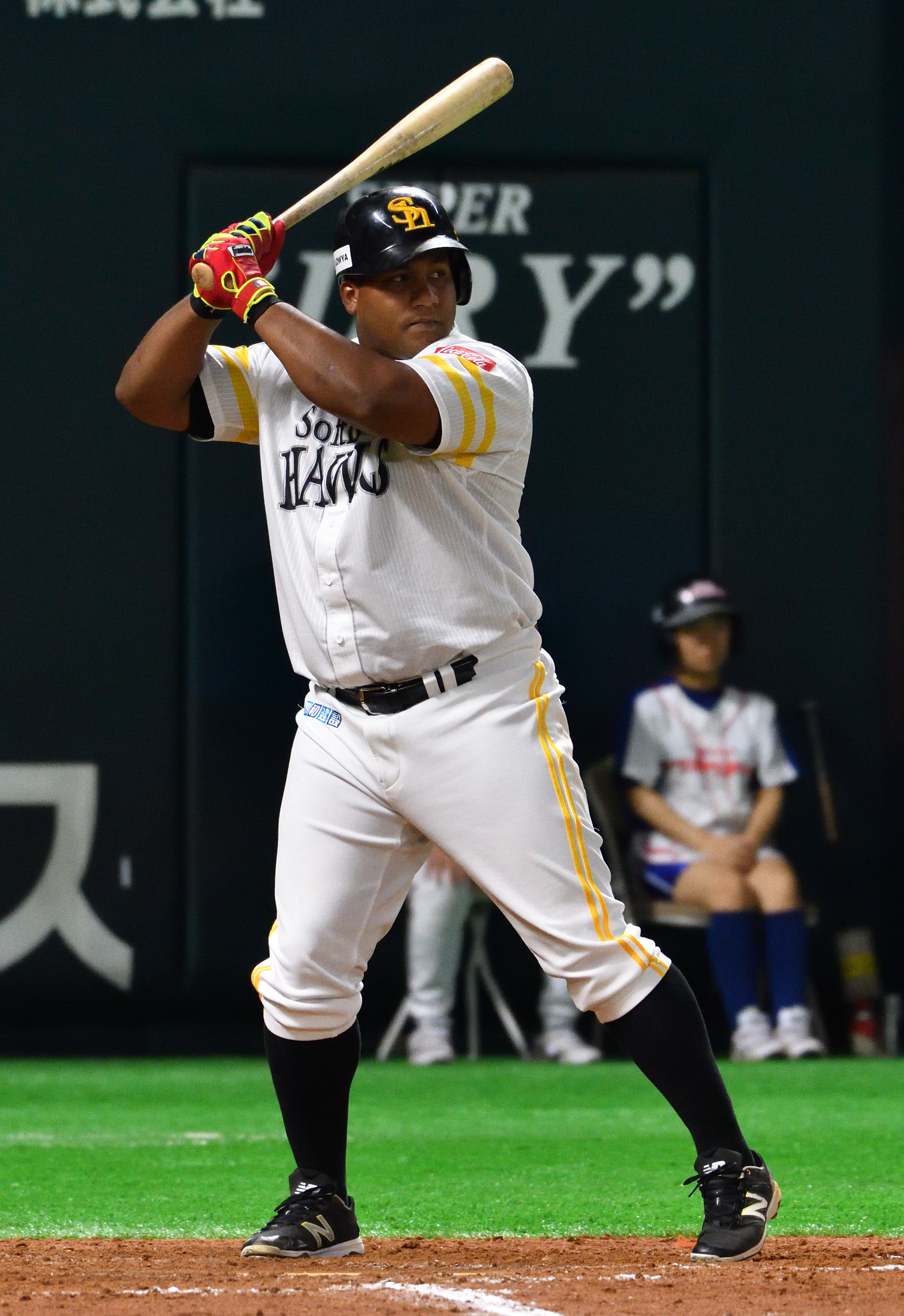
Alfredo Despaigne had three RBIs for SoftBank in Game 3.

Tuesday, October 22, 2019, 6:18 pm (JST) at Tokyo Dome in Bunkyō, Tokyo
Team	1	2	3	4	5	6	7	8	9	R	H	E
SoftBank	0	1	1	4	0	0	0	0	0	6	7	0
Yomiuri	1	0	1	0	0	0	0	0	0	2	6	1
WP: Shuta Ishikawa (1–0) LP: Shosei Togo (0–1); Home runs: SBH: Yurisbel Gracial (2); YOM: Yoshiyuki Kamei 2 (2); Attendance: 44,411; Boxscore

Yuki Takahashi started Game 3 for Yomiuri and Rick van den Hurk started for SoftBank. Yomiuri's Yoshiyuki Kamei scored the game's first run with a solo home run in the first inning. Gracial hit a solo home run for SoftBank in the top of the second inning. Alfredo Despaigne hit an RBI single in the top of the third inning, but Yomiuri tied the game at 2–2 in the bottom of the third inning with another home run by Kamei. Shosei Togo relieved for the Giants in the fourth inning, but allowed four runs, including an RBI sacrifice fly by Yuya Hasegawa, a bases loaded base on balls to Yuki Yanagita, and a two-RBI single by Despaigne. Both teams prevented each other from scoring again, as SoftBank won 6–2, to move to within a victory of a three-peat.

=== Game 4 ===
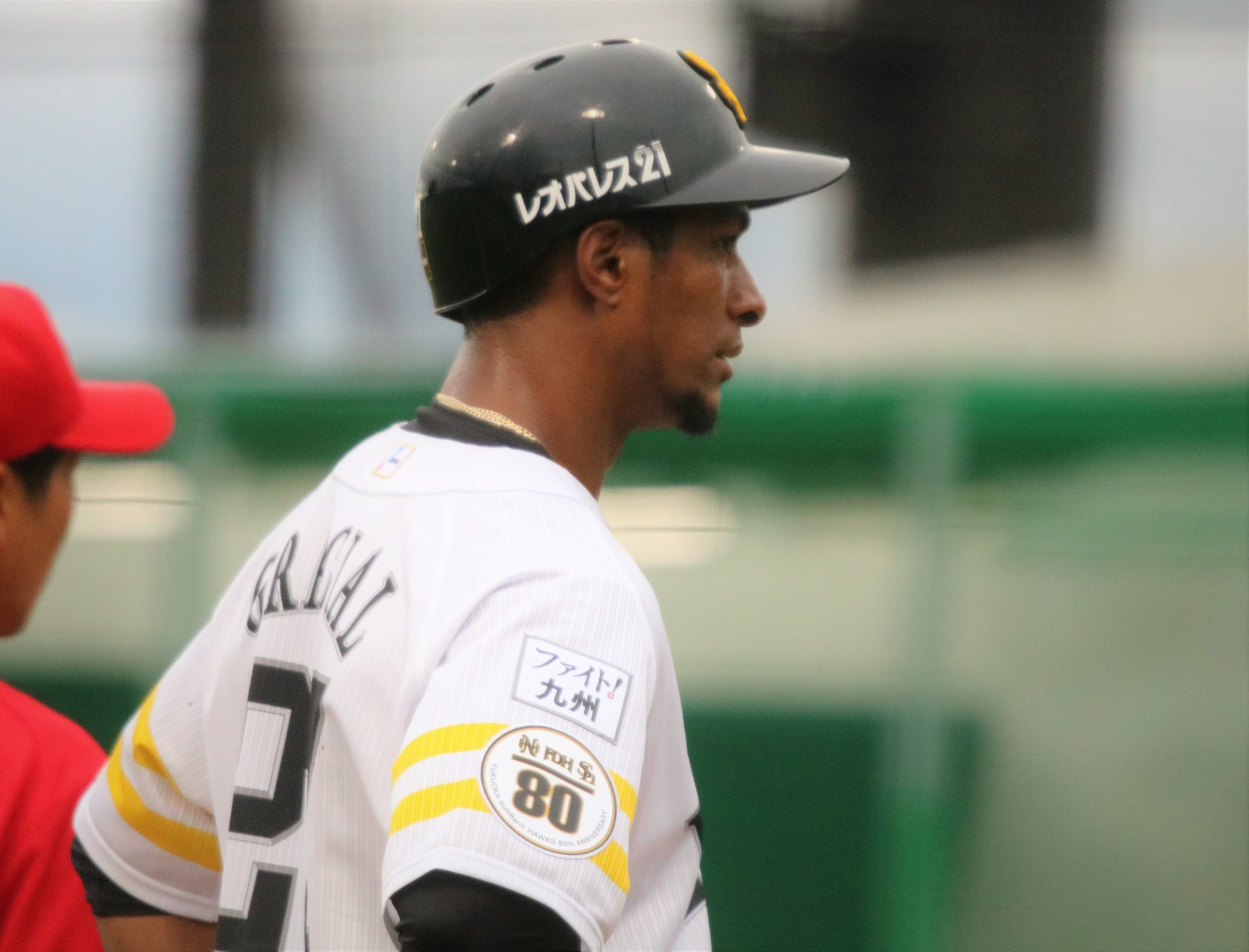
Yurisbel Gracial won the Japan Series Most Valuable Player Award

Wednesday, October 23, 2019, 6:18 pm (JST) at Tokyo Dome in Bunkyō, Tokyo
Team	1	2	3	4	5	6	7	8	9	R	H	E
SoftBank	0	0	0	3	0	0	1	0	0	4	8	0
Yomiuri	0	0	0	0	0	2	1	0	0	3	6	2
WP: Tsuyoshi Wada (1–0) LP: Tomoyuki Sugano (0–1) Sv: Yuito Mori (1); Home runs: SBH: Yurisbel Gracial (3); YOM: Kazuma Okamoto (1); Attendance: 44,708; Boxscore

Tomoyuki Sugano started Game 4 for Yomiuri and Tsuyoshi Wada started for SoftBank. Gracial hit a three-run home run in the fourth inning for SoftBank to open the scoring. Wada struck out six Giants in five innings without allowing a run. The Giants scored their first runs when Kazuma Okamoto hit a two-run home run off of Robert Suárez in the sixth inning. The Hawks and Giants both scored another run in the seventh inning. Mori finished the victory for SoftBank by pitching a scoreless ninth inning, earning the save, to cap the sweep.

The Hawks clinched their third straight Japan Series title with the victory. Gracial, who batted 6-for-16 (.375) with three home runs and six RBIs in the series, won the Japan Series Most Valuable Player Award.

== See also ==
- 2019 Korean Series
- 2019 World Series
