= Nobuhiro Matsuda =

Japanese baseball player (born 1983)

Nobuhiro Matsuda 松田 宣浩
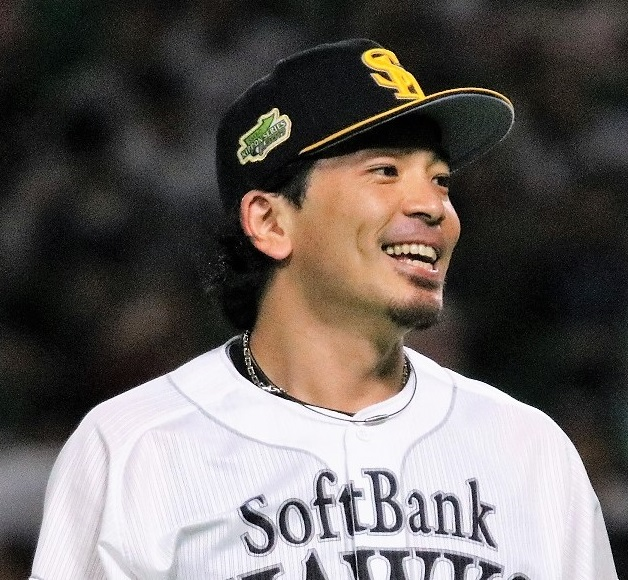
- Matsuda with the Fukuoka SoftBank Hawks
- Infielder
- Born: May 17, 1983 (age 42); Shiga, Japan
- Batted: Right Threw: Right

NPB debut
- March 25, 2006, for the Fukuoka SoftBank Hawks

Last NPB appearance
- October 1, 2023, for the Yomiuri Giants

NPB statistics
- Batting average: .264
- Home runs: 307
- RBI: 1,032
- Hits: 1,886
- Stolen base: 138
- Stats at Baseball Reference

Teams
- Fukuoka SoftBank Hawks (2006–2022); Yomiuri Giants (2023)

Career highlights and awards
- 10× NPB All-Star Game (2011–2013, 2015–2019, 2021); 8× Golden Glove Award (2011, 2013–2019); Best Nine Award (2018); Interleague play MVP (2019); Japan Series Outstanding Player Award (2019); 7× Japan Series champion (2011, 2014–2015, 2017–2020)
Medals
Men's baseball
Representing Japan
World Baseball Classic
Bronze medal – third place	2013 San Francisco	Team
Bronze medal – third place	2017 Los Angeles	Team
WBSC Premier12
Bronze medal – third place	2015 Tokyo	Team
Gold medal – first place	2019 Tokyo	Team

Nobuhiro Matsuda (松田 宣浩, Matsuda Nobuhiro; born May 17, 1983) is a Japanese former professional baseball infielder. He played in Nippon Professional Baseball (NPB) for the Fukuoka SoftBank Hawks and Yomiuri Giants.

== Professional career ==
=== Fukuoka SoftBank Hawks ===
On November 18, 2005, Matsuda was drafted by the Fukuoka SoftBank Hawks in the 2005 Nippon Professional Baseball draft.

==== 2006–2010 season ====
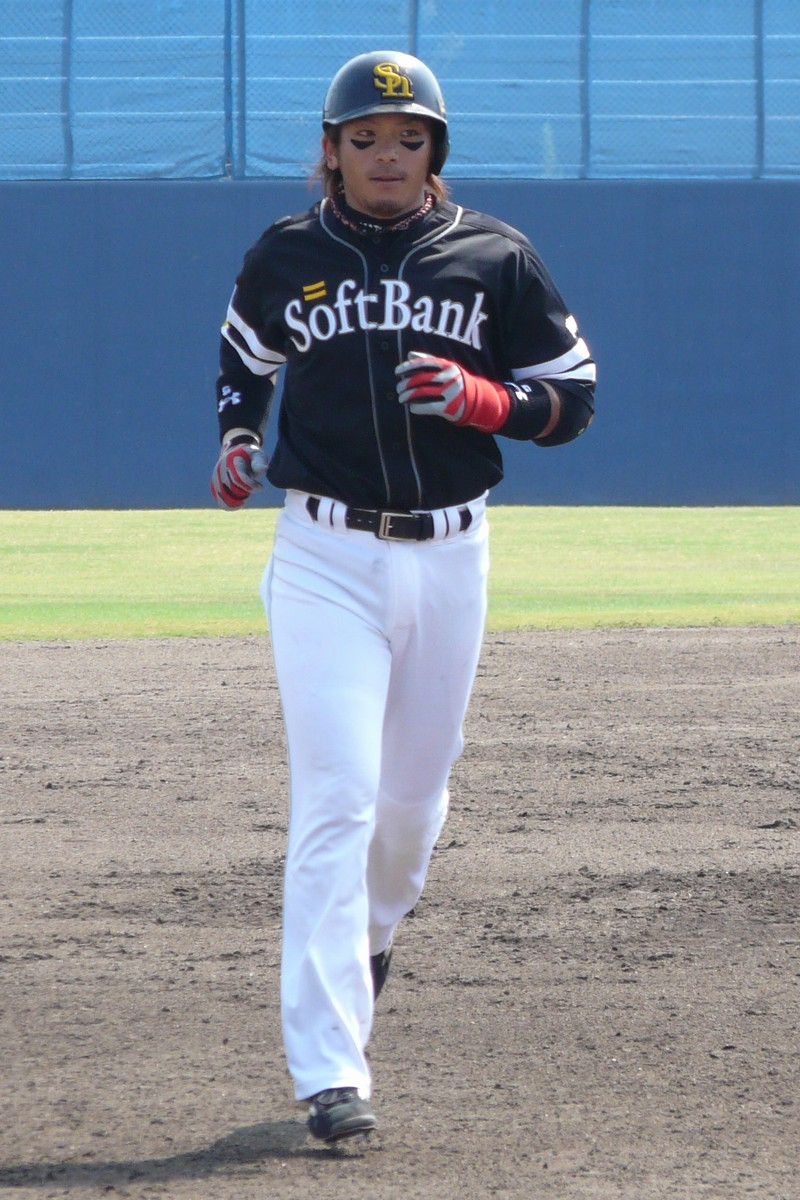
Matsuda in 2009 season.

On March 25, 2006, Matsuda debuted in the Pacific League against the Chiba Lotte Marines, and he recorded his first hit on March 28. On April 22, Matsuda recorded his first home run. In 2006 season, he finished the regular season in 62 games with a batting average of .211, a 3 home runs, a RBI of 18.

In 2007 season, Matsuda did not have a chance to participate in the first half of the season because Hiroki Kokubo, who had been with the Yomiuri Giants until the previous year, returned to the team. but he finished the regular season in 74 games with a batting average of .254, a 7 home runs, a RBI of 22, and a 3 stolen bases.

In 2008 season, Matsuda has become established as a starter for Third baseman. He finished the regular season in 142 games with a batting average of .279, a 17 home runs, a RBI of 63, and a 12 stolen bases. His 10th 3B was the top record in the 2008 Pacific League.

In 2009 season, Matsuda broke his right hand in the opening round on April 3. He returned to the team on June 3 and had four home runs in the Interleague play, but on July 19 he broke his right hand on a hit by pitch. He reduced his number of appearances to 46 due to the impact of his right hand fracture twice during the season.

Matsuda hit his first Walk-off hit from Masahiro Tanaka in the match against the Tohoku Rakuten Golden Eagles on April 18, 2010. And he recorded his first Grand Slam on May 4. He broke his left hand on May 8 and left the team, but returned to the team on June 22. In 2010 season, he finished the regular season in 113 games with a batting average of .255, a 19 home runs, a RBI of 71, and a 17 stolen bases.

==== 2011–2015 season ====
Matsuda hit his first Walk-off home run in the match against the Saitama Seibu Lions on April 17, 2011. On July 22, he participated in the MAZADA All-Star Game 2011 for the first time. In 2011 season, he finished the regular season in all 144 games with a batting average of .282, a 25 home runs, a RBI of 83, and a 27 stolen bases. He participated in the 2011 Japan Series. December 1, Matsuda was honored for the Mitsui Golden Glove Award at the Professional Baseball Convention 2011.

On July 20, 2012, Matsuda participated in the MAZADA All-Star Game 2012 for the 2nd time. In 2012 season, Matsuda had a batting average of .300 or more, 9 home runs and 56 RBIs, but he broke his right hand with a hit by pitch on August 1. He returned to the team on October 5, but had 95 appearances due to injury. And he finished the regular season with a batting average of .300, a 9 home runs, a RBI of 56, and a 16 stolen bases.

On June 13, 2013, Matsuda recorded five hits in one game for the first time in a professional game in the Interleague Play against the Tokyo Yakult Swallows . On July 19, 2013, Matsuda participated in the MAZADA All-Star Game 2013 for the 3rd time. In 2013 season, he finished the regular season in all 144 games with a batting average of .279, a 20 home runs, a RBI of 90, and a 13 stolen bases. On November 26, Matsuda was honored for the Mitsui Golden Glove Award at the 2013 Professional Baseball Convention for the first time in two years.

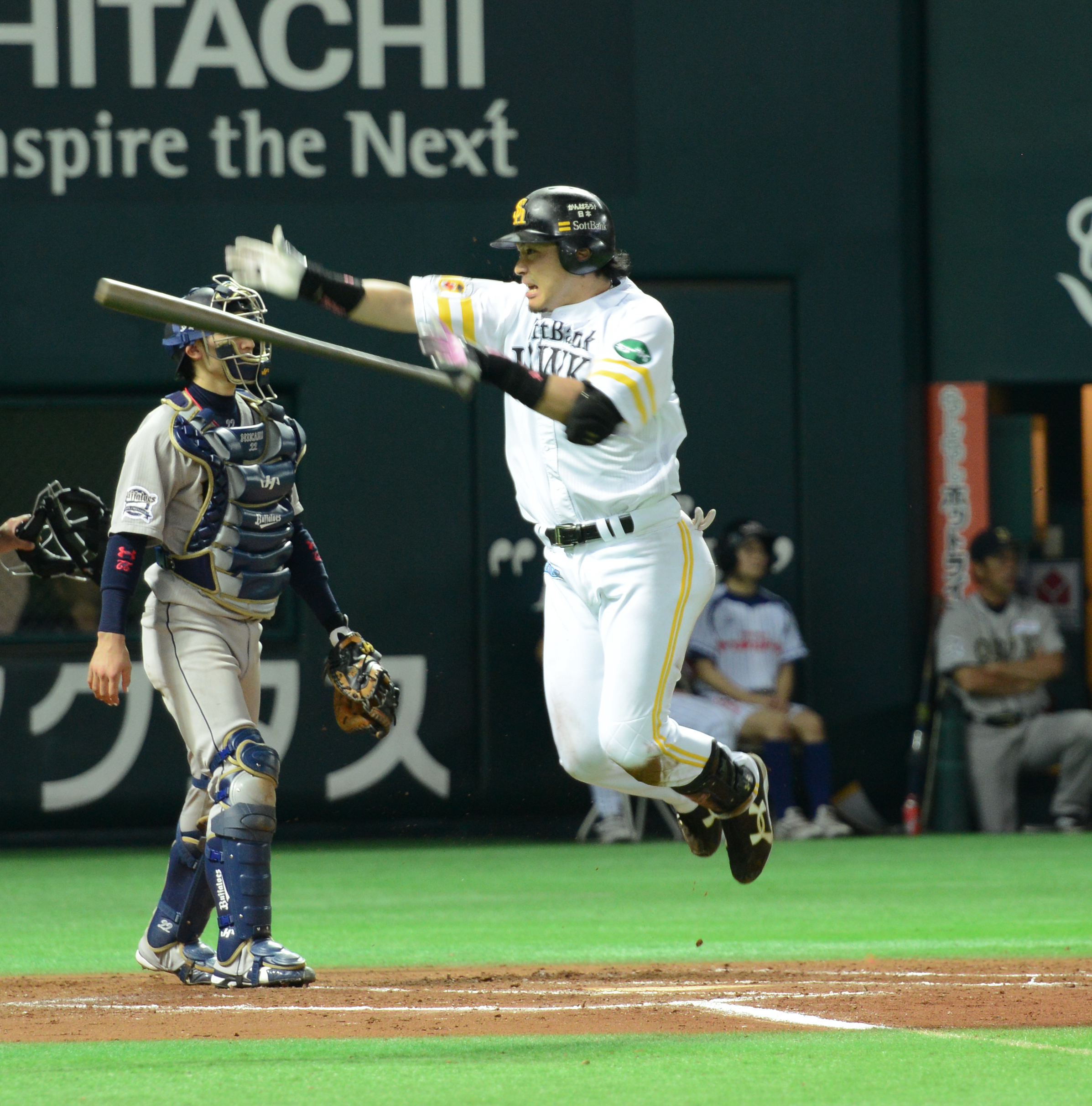
Matsuda's Walk-off hit on October 2, 2014.

In the match against the Chiba Lotte Marines on May 13, 2014, Matsuda recorded NPB's 95,000th home run in the official NPB match. On July 2, he broke his right finger and left the team. For that reason he was elected to the MAZADA All-Star Game 2014 but declined. On August 26, he returned to the team and recorded Hawks' 8,500th home run in total on September 10. In the Pacific League championship match against the Orix Buffaloes on October 2, Matsuda won the Hawks's champion by hitting Walk-off hit in the bottom of the 10th inning, 1 outs, bases loaded. In 2014 season, he finished the regular season in 101 games with a batting average of .301, a 18 home runs, a RBI of 56, and a 12 stolen bases. In the 2014 Japan Series against the Hanshin Tigers, he hit RBI hits in Game 4 and Game 5 and contributed to the team's Japan Series champion. On November 26, Matsuda was honored for the Mitsui Golden Glove Award for the second consecutive year at the NPB Awards 2014.

On June 9, 2015, Matsuda recorded a his total of 1,000 hits in the interleague game against the Hanshin Tigers. And on July 12, he has made 1000 appearances. On July 17, Matsuda participated in the MAZADA All-Star Game 2015 for the 4th time. On August 11, Matsuda has achieved a total of 150 home runs. In 2015 season, he finished the regular season in all 143 games with a batting average of .287, a 35 home runs, a RBI of 94, and a 8 stolen bases. In the 2015 Japan Series against the Tokyo Yakult Swallows, he contributed to the team's second consecutive Japan Series champion by hitting his first home run in the Japan Series in Game 1. On November 25, Matsuda was honored for the Mitsui Golden Glove Award for the third consecutive year at the NPB Awards 2015.

==== 2016–2020 season ====
On July 15, Matsuda participated in the MAZADA All-Star Game 2016 for the 5th time. In 2016 season, he finished the regular season in all 143 games with a batting average of .259, a 27 home runs, a RBI of 85, and a 6 stolen bases. On November 28, Matsuda was honored for the Mitsui Golden Glove Award for the fourth consecutive year at the NPB Awards 2016.

In 2017 season, Matsuda changed his uniform number from 5 to 3. On June 27, he has achieved a total of 200 home runs. On July 14, Matsuda participated in the Mynavi All-Star Game 2017 for the 6th time. He finished the regular season in all 143 games with a batting average of .264, a 24 home runs, a RBI of 71, and a 5 stolen bases. In the 2017 Japan Series against the Yokohama DeNA BayStars, He contributed to the team's Japan Series champion with a hitting home run in Game 6. On November 20, Matsuda was honored for the Mitsui Golden Glove Award for the Fifth consecutive year at the NPB Awards 2017.

On July 13, 2018, Matsuda participated in the Mynavi All-Star Game 2018 for the 7th time. In 2018 season, he finished the regular season in all 143 games with a batting average of .248, a 32 home runs, a RBI of 82, and a 3 stolen bases. In the 2018 Japan Series against the Hiroshima Toyo Carp, he had a bad batting average of .083 in five games. On November 27, Matsuda was honored for the Pacific League Best Nine Award for first time and the Mitsui Golden Glove Award for the 6th consecutive year at the NPB Awards 2018.

In 2019 season, Matsuda changed his uniform number back from 3 to 5. In the opening game on March 29, he achieved 1,500 hits in his home run. And he achieved 1,000 appearances on April 5. Matsuda recorded a total of 250 home runs in the match against the Tohoku Rakuten Golden Eagles on May 3. In the 2019 interleague game, he hit 15 out of 18 games and won the 2019 interleague Most Valuable Player Award with a batting average of .348, 23 hits and 7 home runs. On July 12, Matsuda participated in the Mynavi All-Star Game 2019 for the 8th time. He finished the regular season in all 143 games with a batting average of .260, a 30 home runs, a RBI of 76, and a 5 stolen bases. In the 2019 Japan Series against the Yomiuri Giants, he won the Japan Series Outstanding Player Award with a batting average of .333 (5 hits in 15 at bats), 1 home run, and 3 RBIs in 4 games and contributed to the team's 3rd consecutive Japan Series champion.

In 2020 season, Matsuda had a low batting average of .162 with 71 at-bats in the unattended game for COVID-19 pandemic measures, but in the game on July 10 when Hawks welcomed the spectators, he made his first home run in the 2020 season. He finished the regular season in 116 games with a batting average of .228, a 13 home runs, a RBI of 46, and a one stolen bases. In the 2020 Pacific League Climax Series against the Chiba Lotte Marines, Matsuda contributed by hitting a home run following Akira Nakamura's home run in Game 2. In the 2020 Japan Series against the Yomiuri Giants, although his batting average was .133 in four games, he contributed to the Japan Series champion for the fourth consecutive year with a good defense to help Matt Moore no-hitter pitch in Game 3.

==== 2021–2022 season ====
In 2021 season, Matsuda finished the regular season with a 234 batting average, 14 home runs and 47 runs batted in in 115 games. On August 22, 2021, he recorded his first hit as a substitute in 12 years against the Chiba Lotte Marines. On September 29 against the Saitama Seibu Lions, Matsuda became the 44th player in NPB history to hit a total of 300 homers.

In 2022 season, Matsuda played in only 43 games, and his batting average was a sluggish .204 with seven runs batted in. He also did not hit a home run for the first time in his 17-season career. He was not considered by the team to be a contender for the 2023 season, and faced with the choice of retiring or leaving the team, he announced his decision to retire from the Hawks at a press conference on September 29. A leaving ceremony was held for Matsuda after his last appearance as a Hawks player in a Western League game against the Chunichi Dragons on October 1 at the HAWKS Baseball Park Chikugo, a facility of the Hawks farm team.

=== Yomiuri Giants ===
On November 10, 2022, Matsuda signed with the Yomiuri Giants.

On October 1, 2023, Matsuda retired from professional baseball after 18 years active in the NPB.

== International career ==
Matsuda represented the Japan national baseball team in the 2002 World University Baseball Championship, 2012 exhibition games against Cuba, 2013 World Baseball Classic, 2014 MLB Japan All-Star Series, 2015 exhibition games against Europe, 2015 WBSC Premier12, 2016 exhibition games against Chinese Taipei, 2016 exhibition games against Mexico and Netherlands, 2017 World Baseball Classic and 2019 WBSC Premier12.

On October 1, 2019, he was selected at the 2019 WBSC Premier12.
