= Yuki Yanagita =

Japanese baseball player (born 1988)

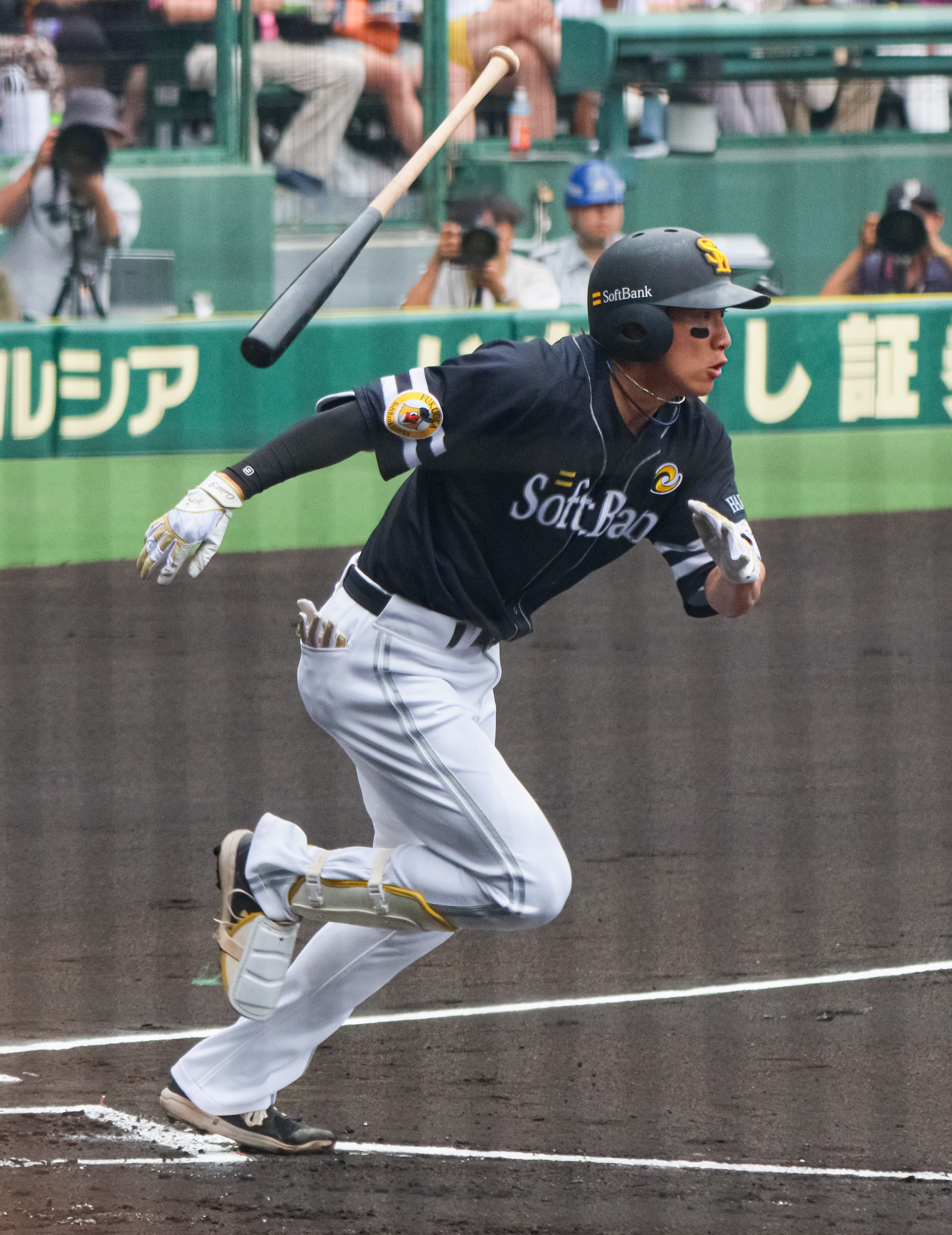
- Yanagita with the Fukuoka SoftBank Hawks

Fukuoka SoftBank Hawks – No. 9
- Outfielder / Designated hitter
- Born: October 9, 1988 (age 38); Hiroshima, Hiroshima, Japan
- Bats: Left Throws: Right

NPB debut
- May 8, 2011, for the Fukuoka SoftBank Hawks

NPB statistics (through 2026)
- Batting average: .311
- Hits: 1,755
- Home runs: 287
- Runs batted in: 969
- Stolen bases: 162
- Stats at Baseball Reference

Teams
- Fukuoka SoftBank Hawks (2011–present)

Career highlights and awards
- NPB: 8× Japan Series champion (2014–2015, 2017–2020, 2025–2026); 4× Japan Series Outstanding Player Award (2014, 2017-2018, 2020); 2× Pacific League MVP (2015, 2020); 2018 PLCS MVP; 8× Pacific League Best Nine Award (2014, 2015, 2017, 2018, 2020, 2021, 2022, 2023); 6× Pacific League Golden Glove Award (2014, 2015, 2017, 2018, 2020, 2021); 2× Pacific League Batting Leader (2015, 2018); 4× Pacific League OBP Leader (2015-2018); 2× Pacific League Hitting Leader (2020, 2023); 5× Pacific League OPS Leader (2015-2018, 2020); Triple 3 (min. .300 BA, 30 HR, 30 SB) (2015); 2× Interleague play (NPB) MVP (2015, 2017); 11× NPB All-Star (2014–2019, 2021-2024, 2026); 3× NPB All-Star Game MVP (2014, 2022, 2023); Hit for the cycle on April 21, 2018; Hochi Professional Sports Award (2015); New Word/Buzzword Award Annual Grand Prize (2015); Pacific League Special Award (2015); SKY PerfecTV! Dramatic Sayonara Award Annual Grand Prize (2015); Yanase 100th Anniversary Award (2016)
Medals
Men's baseball
Representing Japan
Summer Olympics
Gold medal – first place	2020 Tokyo	Team

Yuki Yanagita (柳田 悠岐, Yanagita Yūki; born October 9, 1988 in Hiroshima, Hiroshima, Japan), nicknamed "Gita (ギータ)" and sometimes condescendingly referred to as "Japan's Mike Trout" in English-speaking reports of baseball in Japan, is a Japanese professional baseball outfielder for the Fukuoka SoftBank Hawks of Nippon Professional Baseball (NPB). He is an eleven-time All-Star and a two-time Pacific League MVP, earning those honors in 2015 and 2020.

Yanagita is recognized as one of the most successful players in NPB since the 21st century, based on his accomplishments both team and individual, including eight Japan Series championships and five-time OPS leader.

== Career ==
=== Amateur career ===
After graduating from high school, Yanagita attended the Hiroshima University of Economics. He hit .428 with 8 home runs, 60 RBIs in 82 games during his university career, winning the league batting title in four seasons. Yanagita was drafted in the 2nd round of the 2010 Nippon Professional Baseball draft, selected by the Fukuoka SoftBank Hawks.

=== Professional career ===
==== 2011-2015 season ====
2011

Yanagita appeared in 6 NPB games in 2011, going 0-for-5 with 3 strikeouts. He appeared in 77 games for the Hawks' farm team, with a batting average of .291, an on-base percentage of .375, and a slugging percentage of .518, leading the Western League with 13 home runs.

2012

On June 23, 2012, Yanagita recorded his first career hit, a single against Hokkaido Nippon-Ham Fighters' Mitsuo Yoshikawa in a 7–6 win. Two months later, on August 5, he hit his first NPB home run against Seibu Lions' Hironori Matsunaga.

He appeared in 68 NPB games in 2012, batting .246/.300/.385 with 5 home runs.

2013

Yanagita made the opening day roster in 2013, batting 7th and playing center field, going 1-for-4 in a 7–1 victory against the Tohoku Rakuten Golden Eagles. On June 25, he suffered an injury while attempting to make a diving catch. Three days later, the Hawks announced that his right shoulder had a minor rotator cuff injury, ruling him out for three weeks. Yanagita returned to the team on July 15, unable to play defense until late September. In 104 games, Yanagita hit .295/.377/.483 with 11 home runs, 41 RBIs, and 10 stolen bases.

2014

In May, Yanagita batted .395 with 2 home runs and 8 RBIs and was named the Pacific League Player of the Month for the first time in his career. He was named for his first career NPB All-Star Series via manager selection, hitting a home run against Chunichi Dragons' Daisuke Yamai in game 2. In 2014, Yanagita said that after his first professional season, he played in Puerto Rico and that one thing that helped him improve his game were tips he received from Hall-of-Famer Iván Rodríguez.

Yanagita finished the season with a .317 batting average (3rd in the Pacific League), a .413 OBP (2nd), 33 stolen bases (2nd). With the Hawks going 78–60 with 6 ties, the team clinched the Pacific League pennant, and went on to win the Japan Series over the Hanshin Tigers. During the Japan Series, Yanagita hit 8-for-20 (.400) with 1 RBIs and 5 runs scored. After the season, he won his first Golden Glove Award and Best Nine Award. On December 1, the Hawks announced that Yanagita's uniform number would be changed to No. 9 from #44.

2015: MVP season

In 2015, Yanagita won the Pacific League MVP award after ranking at or near the top of the league in several offensive categories. Yanagita led both leagues with a .363 batting average and led the Pacific League in runs (110), total bases (317), slugging percentage (.631), on base percentage (.469), and walks (88). He ranked second in hits (182) and stolen bases (32) and third in home runs (34, tied) and RBI (99). With the exception of stolen bases, all of these stats were career highs, and Yanagita became the just the 10th player in either league to join the "Triple 3" club (.300 average, 30 home runs, 30 stolen bases). The Hawks went 90–49 with 4 ties, winning the Pacific League pennant, and went on to win their second consecutive Japan Series over the Tokyo Yakult Swallows.

After the season, Yanagita won his second consecutive Golden Glove Award and Best Nine Award. On November 13, he underwent a right elbow surgery, expected to recover in time for the 2016 season.

==== 2016-2020 season ====
2016

On April 15, 2016, Yanagita drew a walk for the 16th consecutive game, breaking Teruo Tabe's Pacific League record in 1951. He eventually tied Sadaharu Oh's NPB record in 1970 with 18 consecutive games with a walk. Yanagita was named for the 2016 NPB All-Star, receiving more votes than any other player in the league. The Hawks finished second in the Pacific League and moved on to the Pacific League Climax Series, but lost to the Hokkaido Nippon-Ham Fighters in the Final Stage.

Yanagita finished the season hitting .306/.446/.523 with 18 home runs, 73 RBIs, and 22 stolen bases, leading the Pacific League in OBP.

2017

On April 28, Yanagita was hit by a 142 km/h (88.2 MPH) fastball by Orix Buffaloes pitcher Yuki Nishi on his left knee and left the game in the third inning, but returned to the lineup on May 2. He was named for the 2017 NPB All-Star, receiving the most votes in the NPB for the second consecutive year. On September 20, Yanagita suffered an injury on his right flank, ruling him out for three weeks. Yanagita returned to the lineup in game 5 of the 2017 Pacific League Climax Series Final Stage, hitting an RBI single in the 4th inning. The Hawks went on to win the Japan Series, with Yanagita hitting 8-for-25 (.320) and 4 RBIs during the series.

Yanagita finished the season hitting .310/.426/.589 with 31 home runs (3rd in the Pacific League), 99 RBIs (2nd), with 14 stolen bases (8th). He won his third Golden Glove and Best Nine Award this season.

2018

In an April 22 game against the Hokkaido Nippon-Ham Fighters, Yanagita became the 65th player in NPB history to hit for the cycle. He was named for the 2018 NPB All-Star, receiving the most votes in the NPB for the third consecutive year. On September 16, he was hit by a batted ball during a pre-game batting practice, and was deactivated from the roster the following day. He returned to the team seven days later. During the 2018 Pacific League Climax Series Final Stage, Yanagita hit .450 with 2 home runs and 8 RBIs, and was named the 2018 PL Climax Series Most Valuable Player. He hit a walk-off home run in game 5 of the 2018 Japan Series against Hiroshima Toyo Carp pitcher Shota Nakazaki, helping his team win their second consecutive Japan Series.

Yanagita led the Pacific League in batting average (.352), on-base percentage (.431), slugging percentage (.661), OPS (1.092), with 36 home runs (2nd), 102 RBIs (4th), 21 stolen bases (7th). He became the 11th player in NPB history to record a batting average above .350 in multiple seasons, and won his fourth Golden Glove and Best Nine Award.

2019

On April 8, 2019, Yanagita left the game after injuring his left knee while attempting to steal third base. The following day, the Hawks announced that he had pulled a muscle, with an expected recovery period of three weeks. His injury was revealed to be more severe after its initial inspection, and he returned to the team on August 21. The Hawks swept the Yomiuri Giants to win their third consecutive Japan Series, with Yanagita going 3–13 (.231) with a home run and 3 RBIs.

He appeared in 38 games in 2019, hitting .289/.420/.516 with 7 home runs and 23 RBIs. After the season, Yanagita underwent a right elbow surgery, expected to recover in three months. On December 25, Yanagita held a press conference, announcing that he signed a seven-year contract with the Hawks that would begin from the 2020 season. He commented that he would "finish" after completing his final year on the contract.

2020

On July 28, 2020, Yanagita recorded a total of 1,000 hits. And he scored 32 runs a month, an equal to the current record at NPB, and won the July Monthly MVP. Yanagita finished the regular season hitting .342/.449/.623 (2nd in the Pacific League) with 29 home runs (3rd), 86 RBIs (3nd). And he won the Pacific League Hits Leader Award with 146 hits. In the 2020 Japan Series against the Yomiuri Giants, Yanagita won the 2020 Japan Series Outstanding Player Award with 6 hits in 14 at bats, batting average of .429, a one home run, and a RBI of 3 in 4 games, including reversal 2-run home run in the Game 4. And he contributed to the team's fourth consecutive Japan Series champion. December 17, Yanagita was honored for the 2nd Pacific League MVP for the first time in 5 years, the fifth Mitsui Golden Glove Award for the first time in 2 years, the fifth Pacific League Best Nine Award for the first time in 2 years, and the Pacific League Hitting Leader Award for the first time at the NPB AWARD 2020.

==== 2021 season-present ====
2021

In the 2021 season, Yanagita hit .300 with 28 home runs and 80 RBIs in 141 games and was also a member of Japan's gold-winning Olympic baseball team. However, the Hawks failed to make the 2021 Pacific League Climax Series, finishing fourth in the Pacific League, missing the playoffs for the first time since Yanagita's sophomore season in 2013. Yanagita agreed to a ¥620 million ($5.46 million) annual salary for the 2022 season on December 17, which made him the highest-paid position player in NPB history.

2022

In the 2022 season, Yanagita was appointed to the position of Hawks' captain by new manager Hiroshi Fujimoto. On April 7, he was diagnosed with rotator cuff tendinitis in his left shoulder and was removed from the first team registration, later returning on April 26. He played as a designated hitter as he recovered from injury, but on May 22 he returned to the right fielder position. He was selected as an All-Star for the eighth time, his eighth consecutive^{§} appearance in the All-Star Series and won All-Star Game 2 MVP after hitting the game-winning home run on July 27. However, he tested positive for COVID-19 and was again removed from the first team registration by regulation on August 23. On September 2, he made his comeback against the Saitama Seibu Lions and was put back in the starting lineup. Despite being frequently hit by injuries and illness, Yanagita played a key role in carrying a beleaguered Hawks squad to nearly winning their 20th Pacific League pennant, only to lose on a head-to-head tiebreaker with the eventual 2022 Japan Series champions, the Orix Buffaloes. In spite of playing in only 117 games and finishing the season with a .275 batting average, 24 home runs, and 79 RBI, due to the weakened offensive climate of the 2022 NPB season, especially in the Pacific League, Yanagita was awarded with his seventh Pacific League Best Nine Award for his role as an outfielder on November 25. On December 6, Yanagita extended his existing contract with the Hawks by multiple years (length undisclosed) with an estimated average annual value of ¥620 million.

^§There was no NPB All-Star Series in 2020 due to complications onset by the COVID-19 pandemic. Yanagita had made every All-Star game from 2014 to 2019.

2023

Yanagida recorded the 69th player in NPB history to hit 250 home runs in a game against the Tohoku Rakuten Golden Eagles on June 28. He was selected as an All-Star for the nine time, his 9th consecutive appearance in the All-Star Series and won All-Star Game 1 MVP after hitting the home run on July 19. Yanagita also achieved the 135th player in NPB history to 1,500 hits, with a home run, in a game against the Saitama Seibu Lions on August 18. Yanagita finished the regular season hitting .299/.378/.484 (3rd in the Pacific League) with 22 home runs (5th), 82 RBIs (2nd). And he won the Pacific League Hits Leader Award with 163 hits. On November 28, 2023, Yanagida was honored with the Pacific League Hits Leader Award for the second time in three season and the Pacific League Best Nine Award for the eighth time in fourth consecutive.

== International career ==
Yanagita was a member of the Japan national baseball team at the 2014 MLB Japan All-Star Series, and was named the series MVP.

On August 20, 2018, he was selected to play in the 2018 MLB Japan All-Star Series. He hit a walk-off two-run home run off of San Diego Padres closer Kirby Yates in the first game of the series.

On June 16, 2021, he was selected as the Japan national baseball team in the Baseball at the 2020 Summer Olympics. He played in all games and became a gold medalist.
