= Shuhei Fukuda =

Japanese baseball player (born 1989)

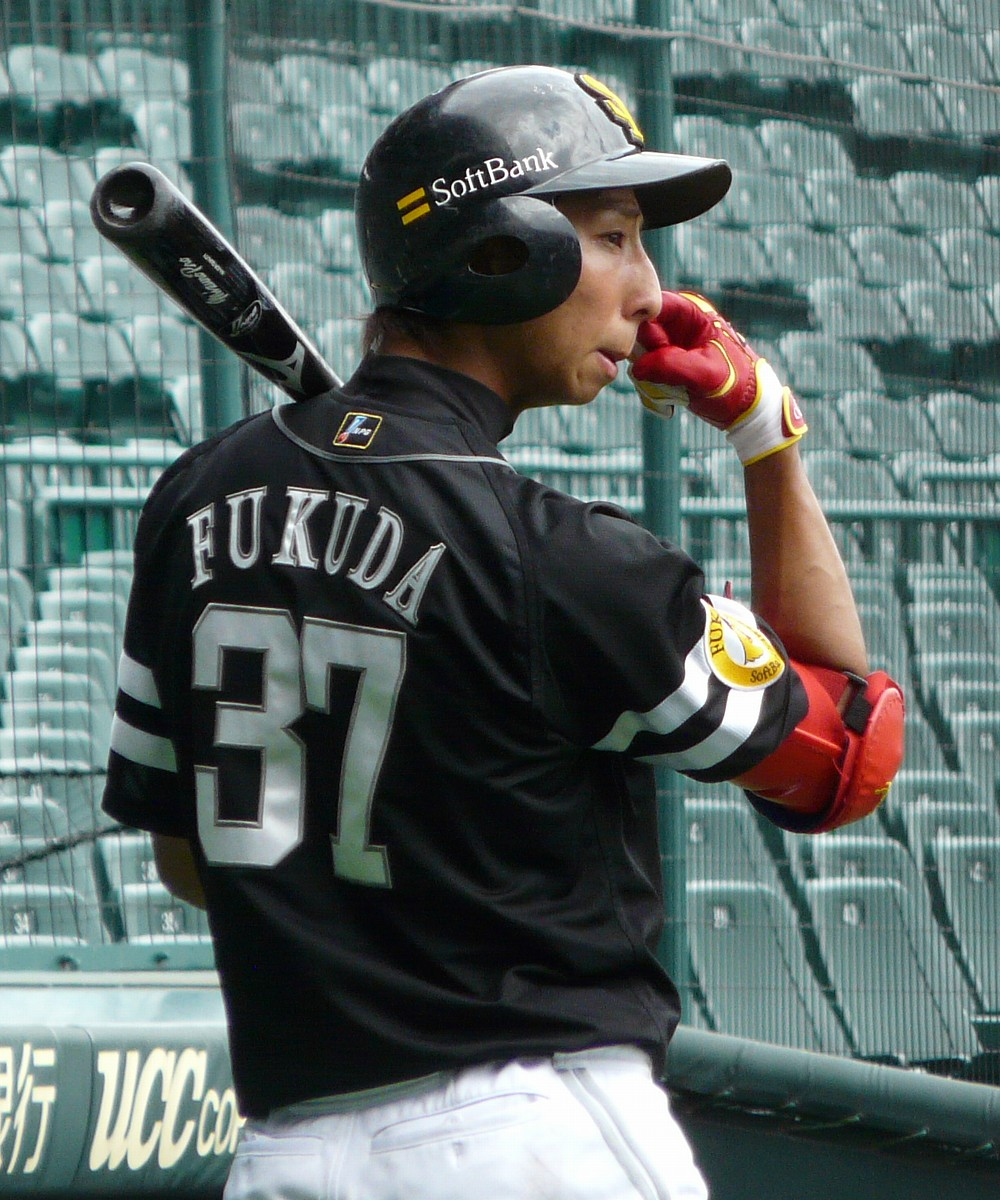
- Fukuda with the Fukuoka SoftBank Hawks

Free agent
- Outfielder / First baseman
- Born: February 10, 1989 (age 37); Kanagawa, Japan
- Bats: Switch Throws: Right

NPB debut
- April 30, 2010, for the Fukuoka SoftBank Hawks

NPB statistics (through 2023 season)
- Batting average: .229
- Home runs: 29
- Runs batted in: 145
- Stats at Baseball Reference

Teams
- Fukuoka SoftBank Hawks (2007–2019); Chiba Lotte Marines (2020–2023)

Career highlights and awards
- 3× Japan Series champion (2011, 2015, 2017)

Shuhei Fukuda (Japanese:福田 秀平, born February 10, 1989) is a Japanese professional baseball player for the Mid East Falcons of Baseball United. He has previously played in Nippon Professional Baseball (NPB) for the Fukuoka SoftBank Hawks and Chiba Lotte Marines. He played for the Brisbane Bandits of the Australian Baseball League in 2010.

== Career ==
On November 26, 2019, Fukuda signed with the Chiba Lotte Marines.

In October 2025, Fukuda signed with the Mid East Falcons of Baseball United.
