= Yuito Mori =

Japanese baseball player (born 1992)

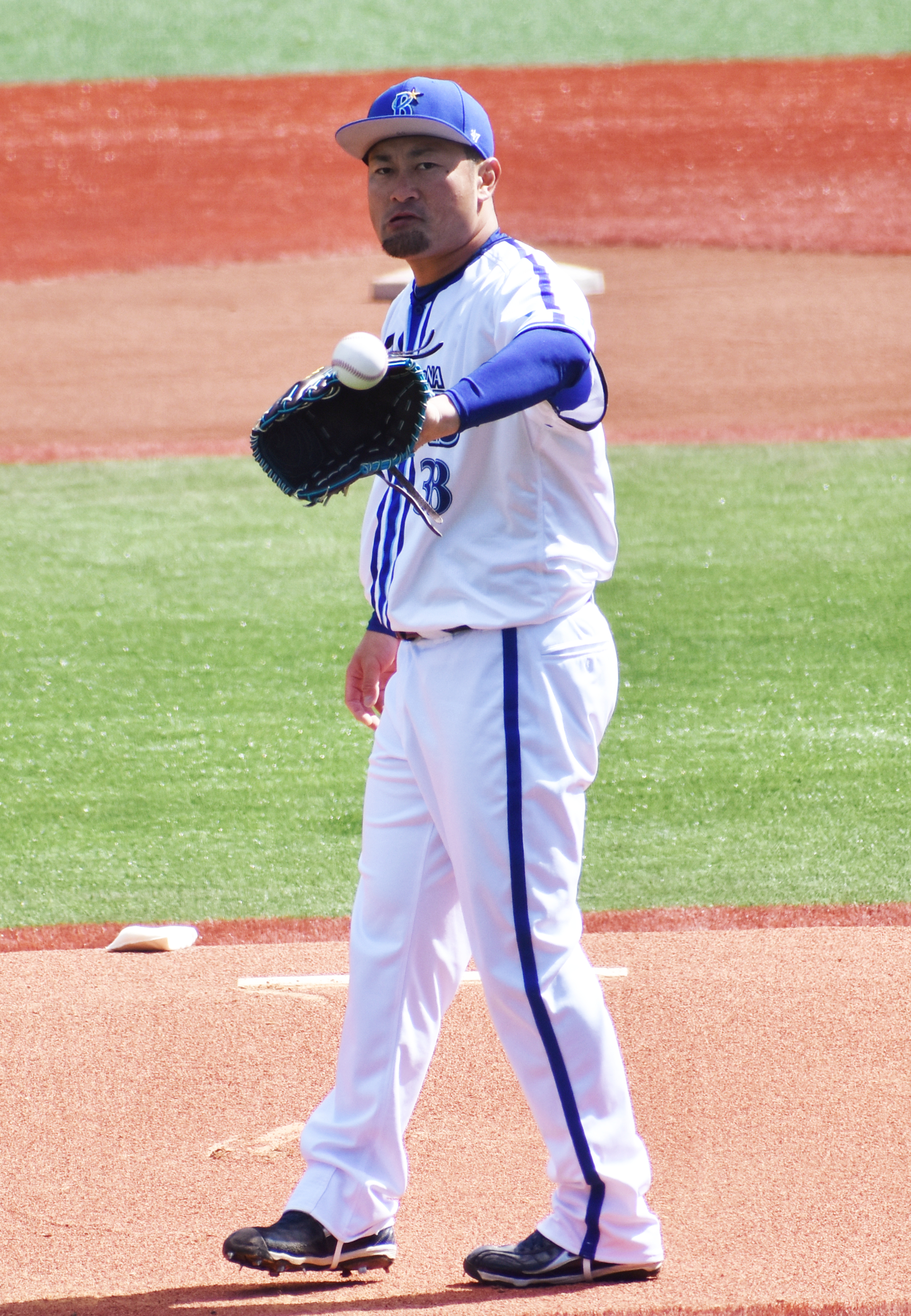
- Mori with the Yokohama DeNA BayStars
- Pitcher
- Born: January 8, 1992 (age 34); Kaifu District, Tokushima, Japan
- Batted: Right Threw: Right

NPB debut
- May 11, 2014, for the Fukuoka SoftBank Hawks

Last NPB appearance
- September 30, 2025, for the Yokohama DeNA BayStars

NPB statistics
- Win–loss record: 27–30
- ERA: 3.21
- Saves: 127
- Strikeouts: 500
- Stats at Baseball Reference

Teams
- Fukuoka SoftBank Hawks (2014–2023); Yokohama DeNA BayStars (2024–2025)

Career highlights and awards
- 2× NPB All-Star (2015, 2018); 6× Japan Series Champion (2014–2015, 2017–2020); Pacific League Saves leader (2018); Japan Series Outstanding Player Award (2018)

Yuito Mori (森 唯斗, Mori Yuito; born January 8, 1992) is a Japanese former professional baseball pitcher. He played in Nippon Professional Baseball (NPB) for the Fukuoka SoftBank Hawks and Yokohama DeNA BayStars from 2014 to 2025.

== Professional career ==
=== Fukuoka SoftBank Hawks ===
On October 24, 2013, Mori was drafted by the Fukuoka Softbank Hawks in the 2013 Nippon Professional Baseball draft.

==== 2014–2015 season ====
On May 11, 2014, Mori debuted in the Pacific League against the Saitama Seibu Lions as a relief pitcher. In the match against the Chunichi Dragons in the Interleague play on May 26, he recorded a Hold for the first time. And in the match against the Hokkaido Nippon-Ham Fighters on July 12, he pitched as a relief pitcher and became his first Winning pitcher. In 2014 season, Mori recorded with a 58 Games pitched, a 4–1 Win–loss record, a 2.33 ERA, a 20 Holds, a one a 54 strikeouts in 65.2 innings. In the 2014 Japan Series against the Hanshin Tigers, he pitched in Game 1, Game 4, and Game 5 as a relief pitcher, scoring 2 Holds in each inning with no runs.

On July 19, 2015, Mori participated the All-Star Game for the first time in MAZDA All-Star Game 2015. In 2015 season, he recorded with a 55 Games pitched, a 5–2 Win–loss record, a 2.69 ERA, a 16 Holds, a 66 strikeouts in 60.1 innings. In the 2015 Japan Series against the Tokyo Yakult Swallows, he pitched in Game 4 and Game 5 as a relief pitcher, contributing to the team's second consecutive Japan Series champion with no runs in either match.

==== 2016–2020 season ====
In the match against the Tohoku Rakuten Golden Eagles on May 8, 2016, he recorded a save for the first time. In 2016 season, he pitched as a setup man, and finished the regular season with a 56 Games pitched, a 4–3 Win–loss record, a 2.98 ERA, a 14 Holds, a one Save, a 51 strikeouts in 60.1 innings.

In 2017 season, Mori finished the regular season with a 64 Games pitched, a 2–3 Win–loss record, a 3.92 ERA, a 33 Holds, a one Save, a 60 strikeouts in 64.1 innings. In the 2017 Japan Series against the Yokohama DeNA BayStars, as a setup man, he pitched in four games, Game 1, Game 2, Game 3, and Game 6, and contributed to the team's first Japan Series champion in two years.

Mori pitched as a setup man until the 2016 season, but he pitched as a closer pitcher because Dennis Sarfate was out of the team for surgery from the 2018 season. On July 13, 2018, he participated in the mynavi All-Star Game 2018 for the 2nd time. Mori recorded seven consecutive Saves on the NPB record between September 18 and 25. He finished the regular season with a 66 Games pitched, a 2–4 Win–loss record, a 2.79 ERA, a 6 Holds, a 37 Saves (League Saves leader), a 61 strikeouts in 61.1 innings. In the 2018 Japan Series against the Hiroshima Toyo Carp, he pitched as a closer and contributed to the team's second consecutive Japan Series champion with a 3 saves in 5 games. On November 27, Mori was honored for the Pacific League Saves leader Award at the NPB AWARD 2018.

Mori had recorded 19 saves as a closer since the start of the 2019 season, but left the team on June 16 due to a back muscle injury. On July 21, he returned to the team and pitched for the rest of the season as a closer. Mori finished the regular season with a 54 Games pitched, a 2–3 Win–loss record, a 2.21 ERA, a 7 Holds, a 35 Saves, a 59 strikeouts in 53 innings. In the 2019 Japan Series against the Yomiuri Giants, he pitched as a closer and contributed to the team's third consecutive Japan Series champion with a one Save in 4 games.

In the match against the Chiba Lotte Marines on August 20, 2020, Mori recorded a total of 100 Holds. And in the match against the Chiba Lotte Marines on October 11, he recorded a total of 100 Saves. In 2020 season, Mori finished the regular season with a 52 Games pitched, a 1–1 Win–loss record, a 2.28 ERA, a 6 Holds, a 32 Saves, a 40 strikeouts in 51.1 innings. In the 2020 Japan Series against the Yomiuri Giants, he pitched as a closer and contributed to the team's fourth consecutive Japan Series champion with a one Save in 3 games.

==== 2021–2023 season ====
On April 29, 2021, Mori was diagnosed with left olecranon bursitis. The Hawks announced he underwent surgery on May 28 and will require four weeks of hospitalization. On September 8, he pitched against the Saitama Seibu Lions after four months of medical treatment. In 2021 season, he finished the regular season with 30 Games pitched, a 1–3 Win–loss record, a 4.03 ERA, a 15 Saves, and a 26 strikeouts in 29 innings.

On September 16, 2022, Mori pitched for the first time as a starting pitcher in his 461st career game. He was recorded as the pitcher who starting pitcher for the first time after playing the most games in NPB. In 2022 season, he finished the regular season with 29 Games pitched, a 2–4 Win–loss record, a 2.62 ERA, a 3 Holds, a 6 Saves, and a 27 strikeouts in 34.1 innings.

In 2023 season, Mori played as a starting pitcher but only pitched in two games.

On October 22, 2023, the Hawks announced they would release him.

=== Yokohama DeNA BayStars ===
==== 2024–2025 ====
On December 1, 2023, Mori signed with the Yokohama DeNA BayStars.

On September 20, 2025, Mori announced that he would be retiring following the conclusion of the season.

== International career ==
On February 23, 2016, Mori was selected for the Japan national baseball team for the 2016 BASEBALL CHALLENGE Japan vs. Chinese Taipei.

On February 27, 2019, he was selected for the Japan national baseball team for the 2019 exhibition games against Mexico.
