= Taisei Makihara =

Japanese baseball player (born 1992)

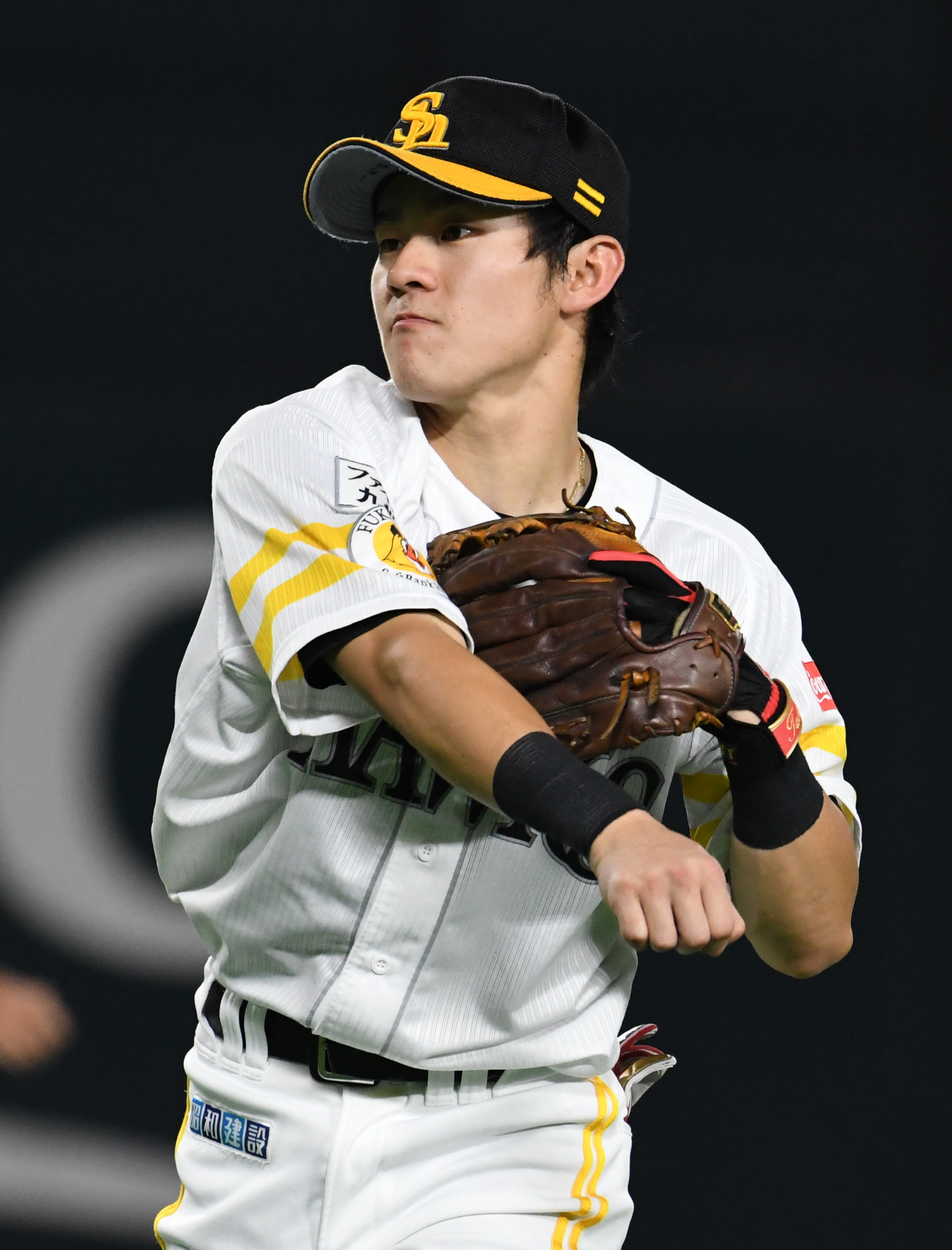
- Makihara with the Fukuoka SoftBank Hawks.

Fukuoka SoftBank Hawks – No. 8
- Infielder
- Born: October 15, 1992 (age 33); Kurume, Fukuoka, Japan
- Bats: Left Throws: Right

NPB debut
- June 14, 2012, for the Fukuoka SoftBank Hawks

NPB statistics (through 2025 season)
- Batting average: .278
- Home runs: 31
- Runs batted in: 276
- Stats at Baseball Reference

Teams
- Fukuoka SoftBank Hawks (2011–present)

Career highlights and awards
- Pacific League Best Nine Award (2025); Pacific League Golden Glove Award (2025); Pacific League Batting Leader (2025); 6× Japan Series champion (2015, 2017–2020, 2025); NPB All-Star (2022)
Medals
Men's baseball
Representing Japan
World Baseball Classic
Gold medal – first place	2023 Miami	Team
21U Baseball World Cup
Silver medal – second place	2014 Taichung	Team

Taisei Makihara (牧原 大成, Makihara Taisei; born October 15, 1992), nicknamed "King JOKER", is a Japanese professional baseball infielder for the Fukuoka SoftBank Hawks of Nippon Professional Baseball (NPB).

King JOKER's nickname comes from his utility player playing style, which allows him to play every defensive position except pitcher and catcher, every batting position in the starting lineup, and even as a pinch hitter and pinch runner, making him a trump card for the team.

== Professional career ==
On October 28, 2010, Makihara was drafted by the Fukuoka SoftBank Hawks as a developmental player in the 2010 Nippon Professional Baseball draft with Kodai Senga and Takuya Kai.

=== 2010–2015 season ===
From 2011 to mid-2012 season, he played in informal matches against Shikoku Island League Plus's teams and amateur baseball teams, and played in the Western League of NPB's minor leagues.

On June 11, 2012, Makihara signed a 4.4 million yen re-contract with the Fukuoka SoftBank Hawks as a registered player under control . On June 14, he debuted in the Interleague play (NPB) against the Chunichi Dragons as a Pinch runner. In 2012 season, he played as a pinch runner in 5 games. And In the Western League, he was chosen as Mizuno Corporation Monthly MVP with recorded a monthly Batting average of .347 and a 3 Stolen bases in June.

In 2013 season, although he played only 6 games, he recorded the most Stolen bases in the Western League and was honored at the Japan Professional Baseball Convention 2013 on November 26.

On July 22, 2014, Makihara recorded his first hit. In 2014 season, although he played only 11 games, he recorded 120 hits in the new Western League record. And on November 26, he was honored with the Western League Batting Champions (batting average of .375) and Western League Excellent Player Award in the NPB AWARDS 2014.

In 2015 season, Makihara finished the regular season in 43 games with a batting average of .159, a 2 Stolen base, and a RBI of 4. And he was selected as the Japan Series roster in the 2015 Japan Series.

=== 2016–2020 season ===
In 2016 season, Makihara finished the regular season in 41 games with a batting average of .244, a 4 Stolen base, and a RBI of 6. On December 14, it was announced that he will change his uniform number from 69 to 36 beginning with the 2017 season.

Makihara could only play 10 games in the 2017 season due to his right shoulder injury in late June.

On July 16, 2018, Makihara recorded his first home run. In 2018 season, he became a starting member, played 59 games and had a batting average of .317, 3 home runs, 9 Stolen base, and RBI of 26, but injured his right foot on September 27. And he was unable to participate in the 2018 Japan Series.

In the 2019 season, Makihara finished the regular season in 114 games with a batting average of .242, a 3 home runs, 9 Stolen base, and a RBI of 27. In the 2019 Pacific League Climax Series against the Saitama Seibu Lions on October 11, he hit a two-run home run and supported starter pitcher Senga. In the 2019 Japan Series against the Yomiuri Giants, he contributed to Hawks' third consecutive Japan Series Champion with offense and defensive, such as recording two consecutive plate appearance hits.

In 2020 season, Makihara finished the regular season in 77 games with a batting average of .241, a one home runs, and a RBI of 8, and a 6 stolen bases. In the 2020 Pacific League Climax Series against the Chiba Lotte Marines, he set a rare record of a double before the Shortstop. In the 2020 Japan Series against the Yomiuri Giants, Makihara participated in all games and contributed to the team's fourth consecutive Japan Series champion.

=== 2021 season–present ===
In 2021 season, Makihara had a .441 batting average from May 1 to May 23, but was removed from the first team registration on June 4 with a strained left thigh area. He was reregistered and returned to the team on June 28, but on July 1 he was diagnosed with a muscle injury to his left biceps femoris muscle and was removed from the first team registration again. When he returned again on August 24, he recorded hits in eight consecutive games from that game. He was limited to 98 games due to injury, but was a utility player, playing 20 games at second base, 15 games at third base, 30 games at shortstop, and 55 games in the outfield at his position for the team.

In 2022 season, Makihara had a strong start to the season through July 3, a batting average .302 with 4 home runs and 24 RBI in 63 games as a utility player. On May 24, in the interleague play against the Yokohama DeNA BayStars, he scored a run on a hit to left off Hiromu Ise, who had gone 21 consecutive games without allowing a run since the start of the season. On July 27, Makihara scored a hit at the My-navi All-Star Game 2022, an all-sue game selected in the 12th year of his career. On August 2 against the Hokkaido Nippon-Ham Fighters, he recorded his sixth homer, his highest of the season. However, on August 20 he was suspected to be positive for COVID-19 and was removed from the first team registration by the regulations. On September 6, he returned and left his name in the starting lineup against the Tohoku Rakuten Golden Eagles. On September 12 against the Saitama Seibu Lions, he achieved his career high of 100 hits in a season. He finished the regular season with career highs of 120 games played, a .301 batting average, six home runs, 123 hits, and 42 runs batted in. His batting average was third in the league, but he was two at bats short of the qualifying number of at bats.

November 27, 2022, Makihara will change his uniform number from 36 to 8 beginning with the 2023 season, it was announced. 8 is the uniform number of Kenji Akashi, who retired at the end of the 2022 season, and Makihara decided to change it to this number because of his respect for him. 36 was also the uniform number Akashi used in the past.

On April 27, 2023, Makihara injured his left thigh and spent a month in rehabilitation. He returned and hit a home run in against the Chiba Lotte Marines on May 27. Also, in the interleague play against the Yokohama DeNA BayStars on June 6, he recorded his first walk-off hit. However, in a game against the Orix Buffaloes on August 30, Makihara was hit by a pitch from opposing pitcher Daiki Tajima, fracturing his right wrist and spending the rest of the season in rehabilitation.

== International career ==
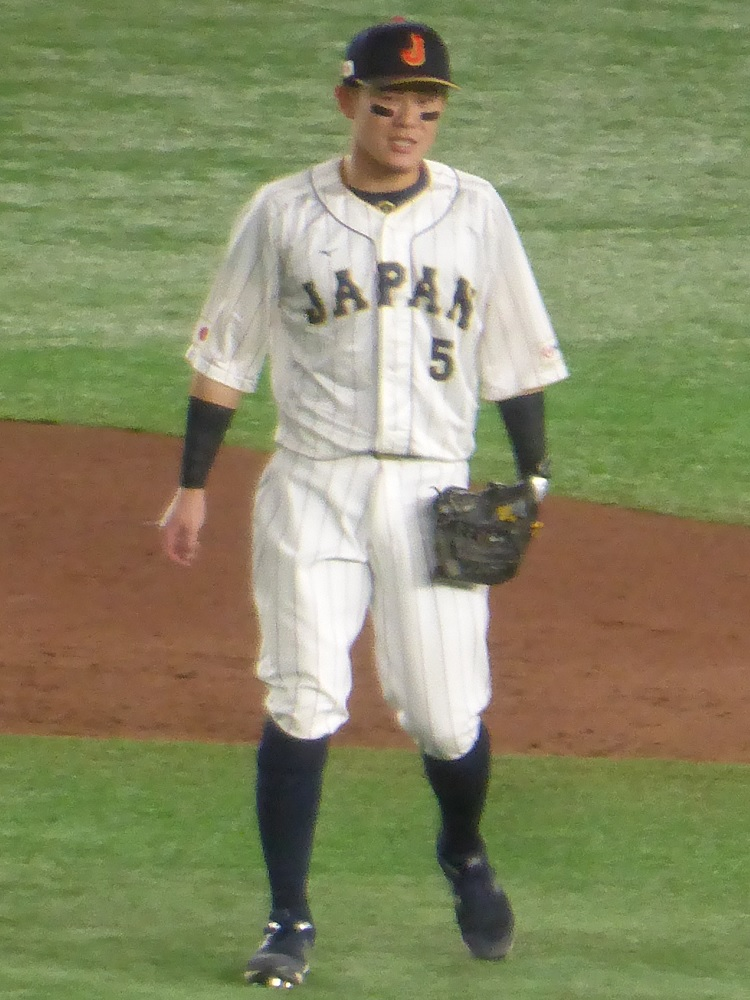
Makihara with the WBC Japan national team at Tokyo Dome on March 16, 2023

On October 21, 2014, Makihara was selected as the Japan national baseball team in the 2014 21U Baseball World Cup. And on November 16, he was honored with the best nine and Best Defensive Player Award at the 2014 21U Baseball World Cup.

On March 1, 2023, Makihara was chosen to participate 2023 World Baseball Classic as a member of Japan national baseball team as a replacement member of Seiya Suzuki, who withdrew from the tournament due to injury.

Makihara appeared in six of the seven games as a pinch runner and as a defensive soldier in the outfield. Also, although he only had two at-bats, he came on as a substitute in the game against the Czech Republic and made a timely hit. He supported the team by utilizing his abilities as a utility player.
