= 2020 Pacific League Climax Series =

Japanese baseball series

N/A		N/A	N/A
N/A		N/A	N/A
- Dates: N/A
Team (Wins)		Manager	Season
Fukuoka SoftBank Hawks (3)		Kimiyasu Kudo	73–42–5 (.635), 14 GA
Chiba Lotte Marines (0)		Tadahito Iguchi	60–57–3 (.513), 14 GB
- Dates: November 14–15
- MVP: Akira Nakamura (SoftBank)
- Umpires: Hideshi Honda, Kazuhiro Kobayashi, Kinji Nishimoto, Koichi Tanba, Tetsuo Yamaji, Fumihiro Yoshimoto
- Television: NHK-BS1 (Games 1–2); Sports Live + (Games 1–2)

The 2020 Pacific League Climax Series (PLCS) was Nippon Professional Baseball's (NPB) playoff series to decide which Pacific League (PL) team would advance to the 2020 Japan Series. Due to the COVID-19 pandemic, the PL decided to modify the traditional Climax Series format and eliminate the First Stage series to instead only play one modified Final Stage series: a best-of-five series, with the PL champion receiving an automatic one-win advantage over the league's runner-up. The Fukuoka SoftBank Hawks, the league's champion, competed against runner-up Chiba Lotte Marines to determine who would advance to the 2020 Japan Series. The series was played from November 14 to 15 at Fukuoka PayPay Dome. With the advantage and two consecutive come-from-behind wins, the Hawks advanced past the Marines to the Japan Series and the Hawks' Akira Nakamura was named the series' Most Valuable Player. SoftBank will compete against the Central League's (CL) regular-season champion, the Yomiuri Giants, in the Japan Series. Because of the pandemic, the CL cancelled their Climax Series altogether, instead opting to send their regular-season champion.

== Background ==
Due to the COVID-19 pandemic, Nippon Professional Baseball pushed back the start of the season from March 20 to June 19 and shortened it from 143 games to 120 games. To maximize the number of intraleague games that could be played, interleague play and the All-Star Series were eliminated. The First Stages of the Climax Series were originally scheduled to be played from October 24 to 26, with the Final Stages taking place between October 28 and November 2. However, with the start of the season being delayed, the series was postponed three weeks. The Pacific League (PL) also decided to eliminate the First Stage to instead only play a modified Final Stage. The league's champion and the runner-up competed in a best-of-five series, with the champion receiving an automatic one-win advantage. As with the regular season's pandemic-related change, the games in the series would end in a tie if no winner was determined after ten innings, a change from the usual 12-innings from previous seasons. The first team to win three games advanced to the Japan Series. The Central League decided to eliminate their Climax Series altogether, instead opting to sending the regular-season champion directly to the Japan Series.This marked the first time since the 2006 NPB season that a playoff series was only played in the Pacific League. For the third year in a row, Persol Holdings sponsored the naming rights for the Pacific League Climax Series, and it is officially known as the "2020 Persol Climax Series PA". In accordance with government guidelines, attendance of the games was limited to 50% of the stadium's capacity.

The Fukuoka SoftBank Hawks clinched the PL pennant on October 27, securing the opportunity to host the runner-up in the Climax Series. The title was the Hawks' first since 2017. A reigning Japanese baseball dynasty, the team had finished either first- or second-place in the league in nine of the last 11 seasons, including every year since 2014, and was fighting for a chance to win their fourth straight Japan Series championship.

A week before the end of the Pacific League's season, three teams were battling for second place and the Climax Series' final playoff slot. The Chiba Lotte Marines, Saitama Seibu Lions, and Tohoku Rakuten Golden Eagles were all within 2.5 games of each other. Lotte and Seibu's second-to-last game of the season was head-to-head. The Marines' win over the Lions secured the team a second-place finish and a place in the Climax Series. It was the Marines first playoff appearance since 2016.

During the regular season, the Hawks and the Marines played 24 games against each other. The Marines won the season series with a 12–11–1 record, however the Hawks won seven of the last eight games. Lotte finished the season 14 games behind the first-place SoftBank. Previously the two teams met in the Climax Series a total of five times, twice in the First Stage, three times in the Final Stage. Lotte won three of the five of those series, however SoftBank is 5–0 in the last two series played.

== Summary ==
Fukuoka SoftBank Hawks won the series, 3–0*.

Game	Date	Score	Location	Time	Attendance
1	November 14	Chiba Lotte Marines – 3, Fukuoka SoftBank Hawks – 4	PayPay Dome	3:19	19,901
2	November 15	Chiba Lotte Marines – 4, Fukuoka SoftBank Hawks – 6	PayPay Dome	3:27	19,995

* The Pacific League regular season champion is given a one-game advantage in the final stage.

== Game summaries ==
=== Game 1 ===
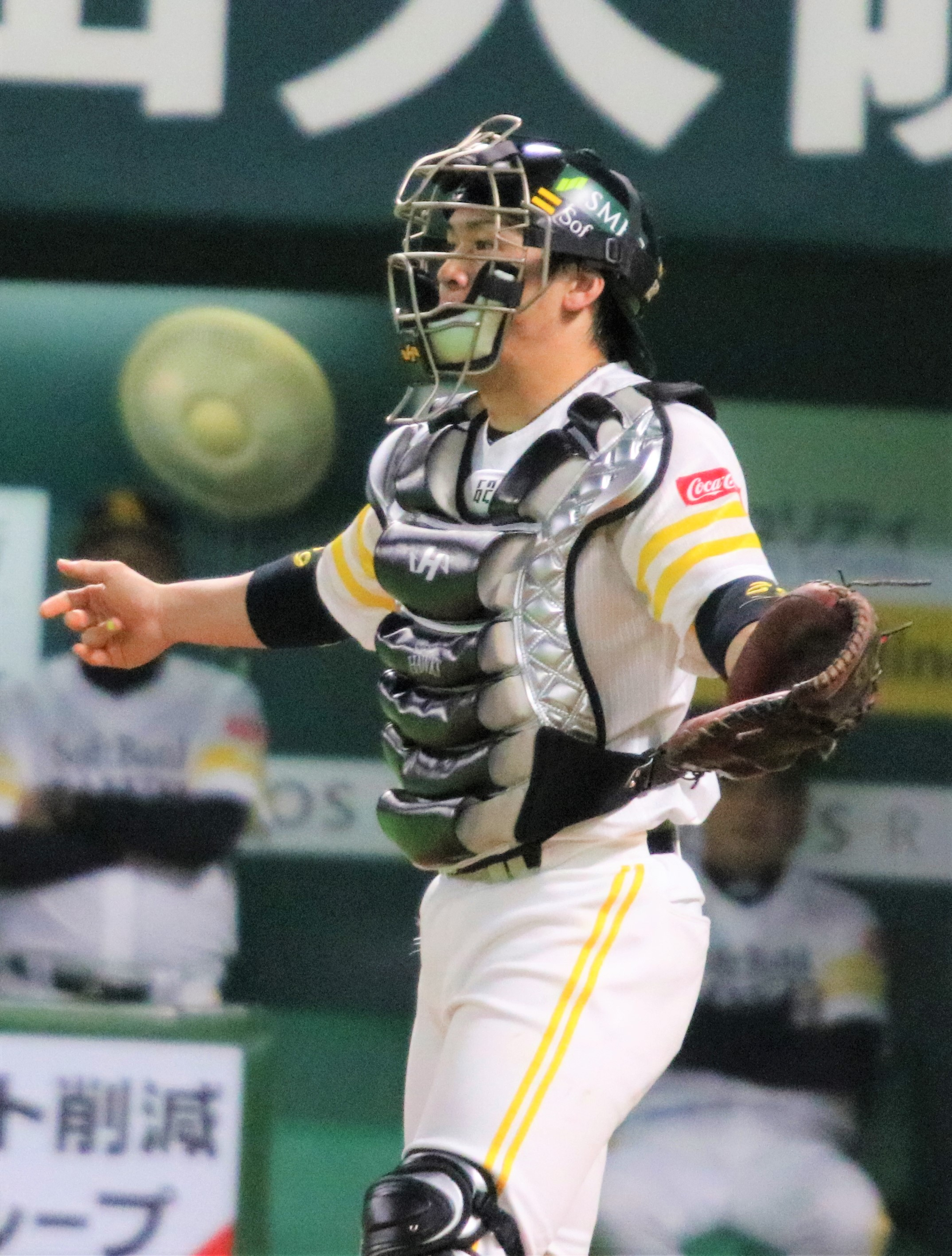
Takuya Kai drove in the winning run in Game 1.

Saturday, November 14, 2020, 1:01 pm (JST) at Fukuoka PayPay Dome in Fukuoka, Fukuoka Prefecture
Team	1	2	3	4	5	6	7	8	9	R	H	E
Lotte	0	2	0	0	1	0	0	0	0	3	8	1
SoftBank	0	0	0	1	0	2	0	1	X	4	11	0
WP: Liván Moinelo (1–0) LP: Hirokazu Sawamura (0–1) Sv: Yuito Mori (1); Home runs: LOT: Hisanori Yasuda (1); SOF: Yuki Yanagita (1); Attendance: 19,901; Boxscore

In Game 1, the Fukuoka SoftBank Hawks' starting pitcher was Kodai Senga, the PL regular-season earned run average leader. Rookie Hisanori Yasuda hit a two-run home run off Senga in the second inning for the first runs of the series. Marines starting pitcher Manabu Mima gave up a solo home run to Yuki Yanagita in the fourth, pulling the Hawks to within one run, 2–1. Lotte made it 3–1 in the fifth after Tatsuhiro Tamura hit a double who then scored on a single by Tadahiro Ogino.

Mima was removed from the game in the sixth inning after giving up back-to-back singles and a sacrifice bunt. Marines relief pitcher Taiki Tojo then allowed a run batted in (RBI) single. With one out, Yurisbel Gracial tied the game when he scored from third base after Seiya Inoue dropped a throw to first base. The Hawks took the lead in the eighth inning. Marines reliever Hirokazu Sawamura gave up two walks before Takuya Kai drove in the winning run. Hawks pitcher Liván Moinelo, in relief of Senga, retired three straight batters in the eighth inning to earn the win, and closer Yuito Mori did the same in the ninth to earn the save.

=== Game 2 ===
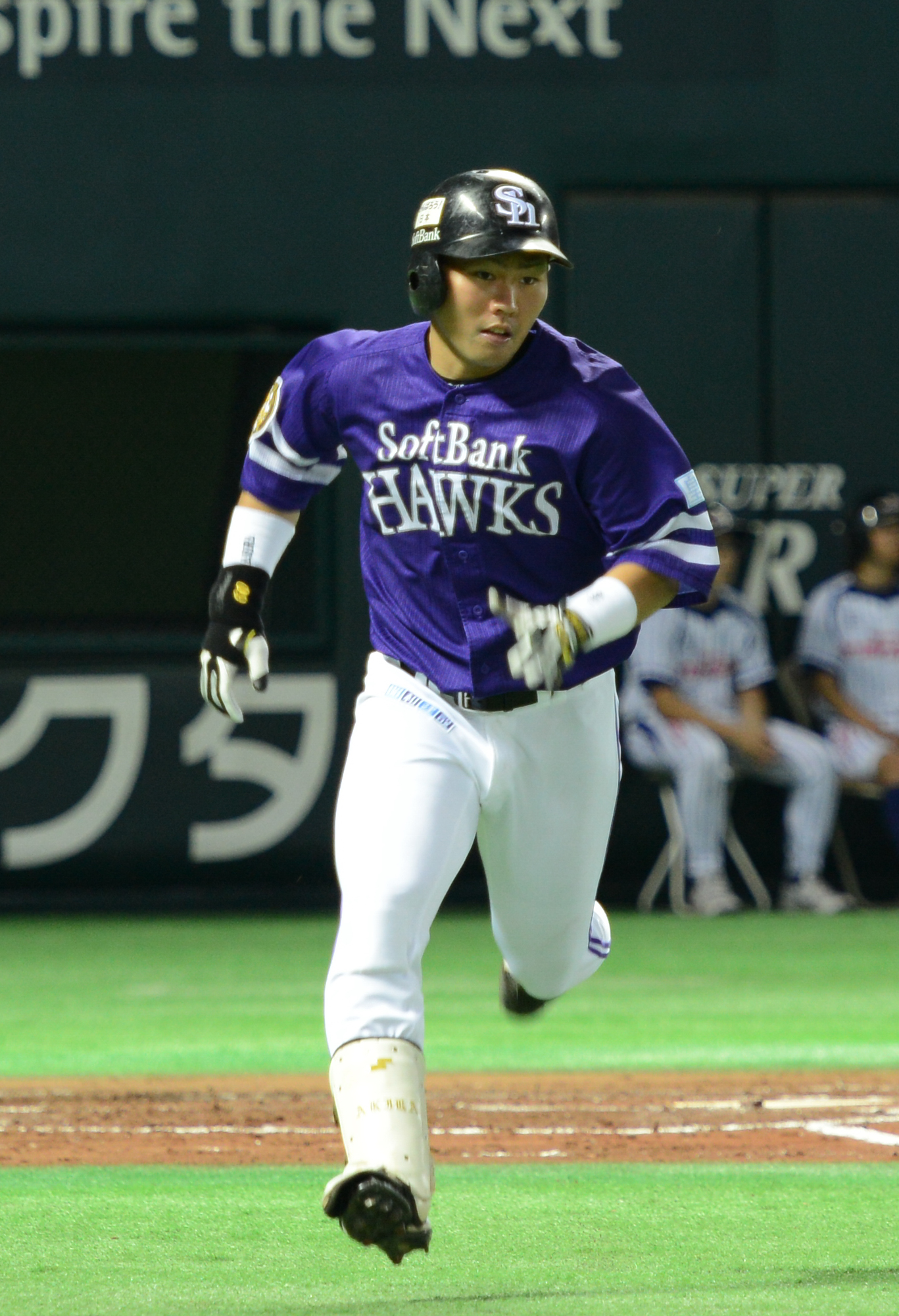
Akira Nakamura hit two two-run home runs in Game 2.

Sunday, November 15, 2020, 1:00 pm (JST) at Fukuoka PayPay Dome in Fukuoka, Fukuoka Prefecture
Team	1	2	3	4	5	6	7	8	9	R	H	E
Lotte	3	0	0	0	0	0	1	0	0	4	12	0
SoftBank	0	2	0	3	0	0	1	0	X	6	10	0
WP: Liván Moinelo (2–0) LP: Wei-Yin Chen (0–1) Sv: Yuito Mori (2); Home runs: LOT: None; SOF: Akira Nakamura 2 (2), Nobuhiro Matsuda (1); Attendance: 19,995; Boxscore

In the first inning of Game 2, the Marines quickly took the lead when Hawks starter Nao Higashihama allowed three runs. Yasuda hit a two-run double and then went on to score on a groundball from Shuhei Fukuda. The next inning, Akira Nakamura cut Lotte's lead to one run when he hit a two-run home run off of Marines starter Wei-Yin Chen. Nakamura then gave SoftBank the lead with a second two-run home run in the fourth inning. On Chen's next pitch, Nobuhiro Matsuda hit a solo home run, prompting the pitcher to be removed from the game.

The Marines had offensive opportunities in both the fourth and fifth innings, however they weren't able to score any runs, in part because of Hawks catcher Kai throwing out a base runner attempting a steal of second base. Higashihama allowed seven hits and struck out four over four innings. Lotte came within one run in the seventh inning with an RBI groundout by Shogo Nakamura, however SoftBank answered with an RBI triple by Ukyo Shuto in the same inning. Hawks closer Mori loaded the bases in the last inning, but was able to close out the inning and earn a save. Akira Nakamura was named the series Most Valuable Player and the Hawks' win was a record-breaking 12th consecutive postseason win.

== See also ==
- Impact of the COVID-19 pandemic on sports
