= Takuya Kai =

Japanese baseball player (born 1992)

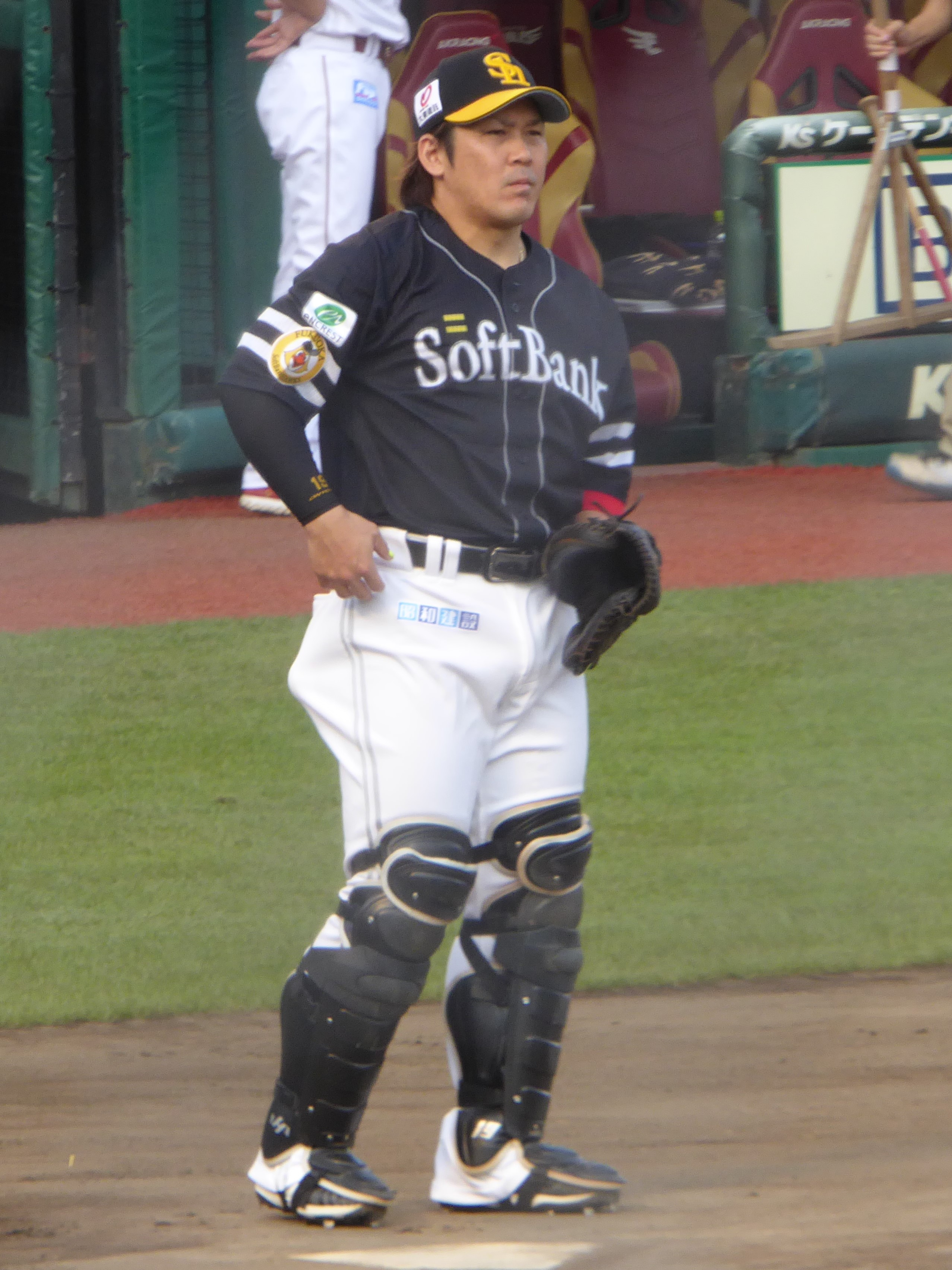
- Kai with the Fukuoka SoftBank Hawks

Yomiuri Giants – No. 10
- Catcher
- Born: November 5, 1992 (age 34); Ōita, Ōita, Japan
- Bats: Right Throws: Right

NPB debut
- June 7, 2014, for the Fukuoka SoftBank Hawks

NPB statistics (through 2025 season)
- Batting average: .226
- Home runs: 66
- Runs batted in: 310
- Stats at Baseball Reference

Teams
- Fukuoka SoftBank Hawks (2011–2024); Yomiuri Giants (2025–present)

Career highlights and awards
- NPB: 6× Japan Series champion (2014–2015, 2017–2020); Japan Series MVP (2018); 4× NPB All-Star (2018, 2019, 2021, 2025); 6× Pacific League Golden Glove Award (2017–2022); 3× Pacific League Best Nine Award (2017, 2020, 2022); International: Tokyo 2020 All-Olympic Baseball Team (2021)
Medals
Men's baseball
Representing Japan
Summer Olympics
Gold medal – first place	2020 Tokyo	Team
World Baseball Classic
Gold medal – first place	2023 Miami	Team
WBSC Premier12
Gold medal – first place	2019 Tokyo	Team
Asia Professional Baseball Championship
Gold medal – first place	2017 Tokyo	Team

Takuya Kai (甲斐 拓也, Kai Takuya; born November 5, 1992) is a Japanese professional baseball catcher for the Yomiuri Giants of the Nippon Professional Baseball (NPB). He has previously played in NPB for the Fukuoka SoftBank Hawks.

== Professional career ==
=== Fukuoka SoftBank Hawks ===
On October 28, 2010, Kai was drafted by the Fukuoka SoftBank Hawks as a developmental player in the 2010 Nippon Professional Baseball draft with Kodai Senga and Taisei Makihara.

==== 2011–2015 ====
In 2011–2013 season, Kai played in informal matches against the Shikoku Island League Plus's teams and amateur baseball teams, and played in the Western League of NPB's second league.

On November 21, 2013, Kai re–signed with Fukuoka on a ¥5 million contract with the as a registered player under control.

On June 7, 2014, Kai debuted in the Interleague play (NPB) against the Hiroshima Toyo Carp. Afterwards, he was selected as the Japan Series roster in the 2014 Japan Series.

In 2015, although Kai played in only one game, he was selected to the team's Japan Series roster in the 2015 Japan Series.

==== 2016–2020 ====
On June 16, 2016, Kai recorded his first career hit and RBI as a pinch hitter. On the season, he finished the regular season having played in 13 games with a batting average of .167 and only one RBI.

In the 2017 season, Kai mainly teamed up with young starter pitchers such as Kodai Senga, Nao Higashihama, Shuta Ishikawa, and Yuki Matsumoto. On May 3, he recorded his first home run in NPB, a grand slam. Kai finished the regular season having made 103 appearances and batting .232 with five home runs and 18 RBI.

In the 2017 Japan Series, Kai and Senga's battery were the first to win the Japan Series as players who was drafted as a developmental squad player. On November 17, he won the 2017 Pacific League Mitsui Golden Glove Award and 2017 Pacific League Best Nine Award for the first time as a player drafted as a developmental squad player.

In the 2018 season, Kai played in 133 games and hit .213 with seven home runs and 37 RBI. On July 3, he was selected to the 2018 NPB All-Star game. In the 2018 Japan Series, Kai set a Japan Series record with six consecutive caught stealings, and won the Japan Series Most Valuable Player Award. On November 29, he won the 2018 Pacific League Mitsui Golden Glove Award.

In the 2019 season, Kai made 137 appearances for Fukuoka, batting .260 with 11 home runs and 43 RBI, as a regular catcher of the Hawks. On July 1, he was selected to the 2019 NPB All-Star game. On September 6, Kai caught Kodai Senga's no–hitter. In the 2019 Japan Series, he started at catcher, and the Hawks achieved their third consecutive Japan Series victory. On October 31, he was selected as a 2019 Pacific League Mitsui Golden Glove Award winner.

In 2020, Kai changed his uniform number from 62 to Katsuya Nomura's Hawks era number 19. He supported the pitchers as the starting catcher and finished the regular season with a batting average of .211, 11 home runs, 33 RBI, 44 stolen bases, and 22 sacrifice bunts in 104 games. Kai recorded more than 10 home runs for the second consecutive year, becoming the first catcher to achieve the feat since Kenji Jojima, and his 22 sacrifice hits were the most in the Pacific League in 2020. In the postseason, Kai recorded home runs in Game 2 and Game 3 and contributed to the team's fourth consecutive Japan Series championship in the 2020 Japan Series against the Yomiuri Giants. December 17, Kai was honored with his fourth Mitsui Golden Glove Award in four consecutive years, his second Pacific League Best Nine Award for the first time in three years, and the Best Battery Award with Kodai Senga.

==== 2021–2024 ====
In 2021, Kai played in all 143 games and finished the year with a .227 batting average, 12 home runs and 44 RBI. He also had 26 sacrifice bunts, a .999 fielding percentage, a .452 stolen base prevention percentage, and 102 assists, which led the league. On December 16, 2021, Kai was honored with a Pacific League Golden Glove Award for the fifth consecutive season. The next day, he re–signed with the Hawks for an estimated annual salary of 210 million yen, making him the highest paid active catcher.

On June 28, 2022, Kai tested positive for COVID-19 and was removed from the roster by regulation, but returned on July 17. As a result, his appearances were reduced to 130, even though he was a regular catcher, and his batting average slumped to .180. However, Kai's 38 sacrifice bunts, the most in his career, were the highest in the league. On November 25, Kai won the Pacific League Golden Glove Award for the sixth consecutive year, and the Pacific League Best Nine Award for the third time in two years.

On August 18, 2023, Kai caught Shuta Ishikawa's no–hitter. In a game against the Saitama Seibu Lions on September 3, Kai hit two home runs, reaching 10 home runs for the first time in two years. Kai played 139 games, and finished the season with a .202 batting average, 10 home runs, and 44 RBI.

=== Yomiuri Giants ===
==== 2025–present ====
On December 17, 2024, Kai signed with the Yomiuri Giants.

== International career ==
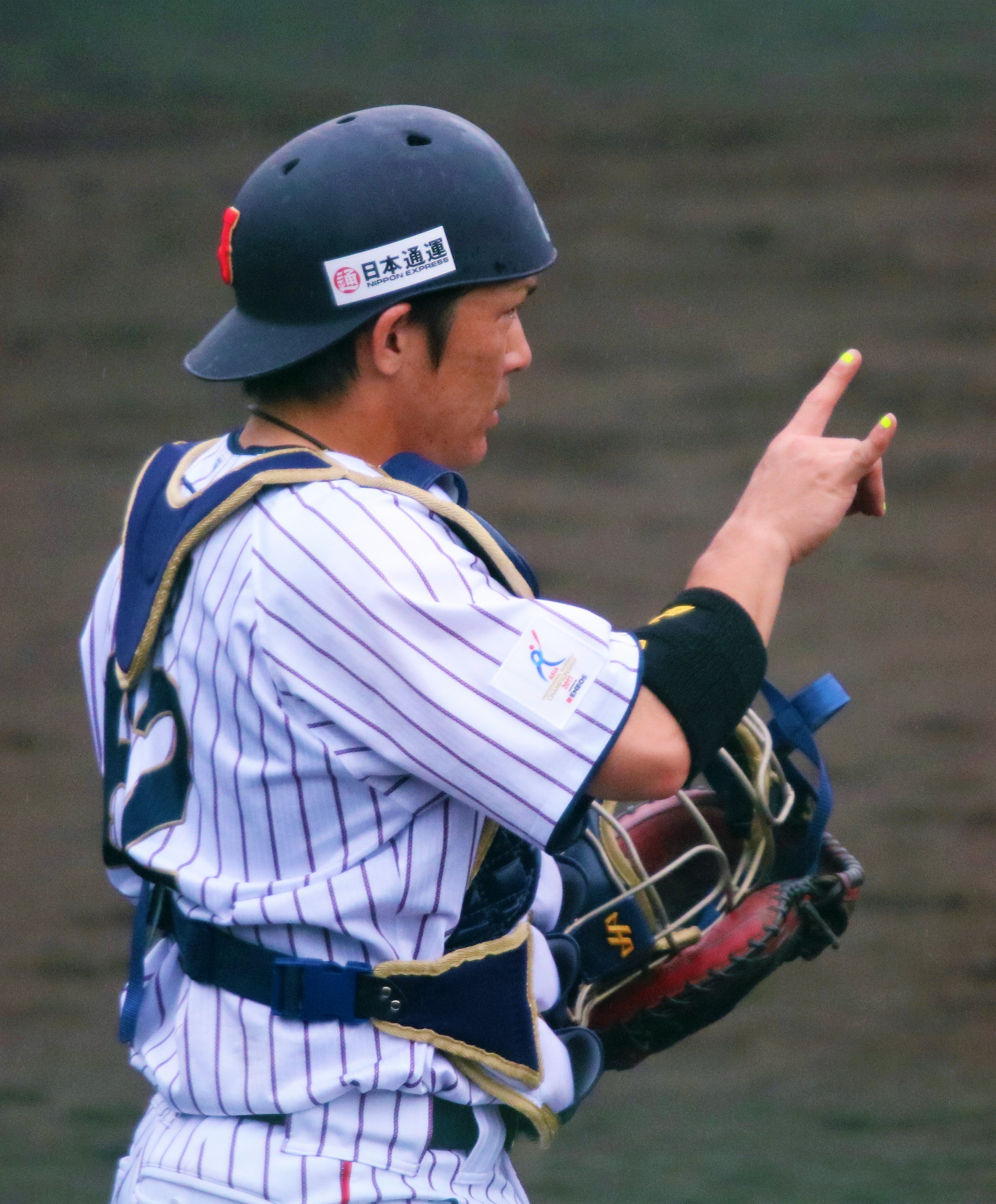
Kai with the Japan national baseball team

Kai represented the Japan national baseball team in the 2018 MLB Japan All-Star Series and 2019 WBSC Premier12.

On October 12, 2017, he was selected as the Japan national baseball team in the 2017 Asia Professional Baseball Championship.

On October 10, 2018, he was selected to the 2018 MLB Japan All-Star Series. He was presented with a bat, Catcher's mitts, leggers and protector from Yadier Molina.

On October 1, 2019, he was selected as the Japan national baseball team to the 2019 WBSC Premier12.

On June 16, 2021, he was selected as the Japan national baseball team in the Baseball at the 2020 Summer Olympics. He appeared in four games and went 5-for-10, .500 batting average. And he didn't commit an error. On August 7, he was selected Tokyo 2020 All-Olympic Baseball Team (Best Nine Award) by the WBSC.

Kai represented the Japan national baseball team in the Samurai Japan Series 2022.

== Skills profile ==
Kai's pop-time averaged 1.83 seconds (855 2/3 Innings), the fastest recorded 1.73 seconds.

His strong throw is called Kai Cannon (甲斐キャノン). "Kai Cannon" is named after Guncannon appearing in Mobile Suit Gundam and its pilot Kai Shiden.
