= Seiya Inoue =

Seiya Inoue may refer to:

- Seiya Inoue (baseball)
- Seiya Inoue (footballer)
