= 2020 Japan Series =

71st edition of the Japan Series

| Team (Wins) | Managers | Season |
|---|---|---|
| Fukuoka SoftBank Hawks (4) | Kimiyasu Kudo | 73–42–5 (.635) |
| Yomiuri Giants (0) | Tatsunori Hara | 67–45–8 (.598) |
- Dates: November 21–25
- MVP: Ryoya Kurihara (Fukuoka)
- FSA: Shosei Togo (Yomiuri)
- Umpires: Atsushi Fukaya, Masaharu Kasahara, Naoto Shikita, Tetsuya Shimata, Chikara Tsugawa, Takanori Yamamoto

Broadcast
- Television: NTV (Games 1–2); NHK-BS1 (Games 2–4); TV Asahi (Game 3); Fuji TV (Game 4)

The 2020 Japan Series (known as the SMBC Nippon Series 2020 for sponsorship reasons) was the championship series of Nippon Professional Baseball's (NPB) 2020 season. The 71st edition of the Japan Series, it was played from November 21 to 25. The series was a best-of-seven playoff between the Fukuoka SoftBank Hawks, the Pacific League's (PL) Climax Series champion, and the defending Japan Series champions, and the Yomiuri Giants, the Central League's (CL) regular-season champion. The series was a rematch of the previous year's Japan Series.

The Hawks finished the season in 1st place, their first PL title since 2017. Due to the COVID-19 pandemic, the PL decided to modify the traditional Climax Series format and eliminate the First Stage series to instead play only one modified Final Stage series. In this series, SoftBank defeated the Chiba Lotte Marines, the regular season runner-up to advance to the Japan Series. The CL cancelled their Climax Series altogether due to the pandemic, opting instead to send their regular-season champion, the Giants, directly to the Japan Series.

The Hawks swept the Giants for the second straight year to win the series, their fourth straight. SoftBank outfielder Ryoya Kurihara was named the Japan Series Most Valuable Player.

With the Hawks' Japan Series win, for the first time since 1950, the Pacific League led in Japan Series titles.

The series would also be the second most one-sided Japan Series, with the Hawks outscoring the Giants, 26-4. Only the 2005 Japan Series was more one-sided, 33–4 in favor of the Chiba Lotte Marines over the Hanshin Tigers.

== Climax Series ==
The COVID-19 pandemic prompted Nippon Professional Baseball (NPB) to modify the Climax Series. Instead of having the regular season's top three teams participate in the usual two-stage playoff, the Pacific League (PL) decided to eliminate the First Stage series and play only one modified Final Stage series. The league's champion and the runner-up competed in a best-of-four series, with the champion receiving a one-win advantage. The first team to win three games advanced to the Japan Series. The Central League (CL) decided to eliminate their Climax Series altogether, instead opting to sending the regular-season champion directly to the Japan Series.

The Fukuoka SoftBank Hawks finished the PL regular season in first place, winning the team its first PL pennant since 2017. The team had finished either first- or second-place in the league in nine of the last 11 seasons, including every year since 2014. The Chiba Lotte Marines narrowly edged out the Saitama Seibu Lions at the end of the season to secure second place and the chance to play the Hawks in the Climax Series. During the regular season, the Hawks and the Marines played 24 games against each other. The Marines won the season series with a 12–11–1 record, however the Hawks won seven of the last eight games. Lotte finished the season 14 games behind the first-place SoftBank. With the one-win advantage and two consecutive come-from-behind Climax Series wins, the Hawks advanced past the Marines to the Japan Series to compete against the Yomiuri Giants. Because the CL's decision to eliminate its Climax Series, the Giants advanced directly to the Japan Series. Yomiuri finished the season 7.5 games ahead of the nearest runner-up, the Hanshin Tigers.

| Pacific League Climax Series | | | Japan Series |
| | | | CL1 | Yomiuri Giants | 0 |
| 1 | Fukuoka SoftBank Hawks | 3 | PL1 | Fukuoka SoftBank Hawks | 4 |
| 2 | Chiba Lotte Marines | 0 |

== Series notes ==
The series was a rematch of last year's Japan Series between the Fukuoka SoftBank Hawks and the Yomiuri Giants, in which the Hawks swept the Giants to win in four straight games. SoftBank won the previous three Japan Series and five in the last six years and were looking to become only the second NPB team to ever win four or more titles consecutively, behind only the Giants' nine-year streak from 1965 to 1973. Yomiuri had won 22 Japan Series championships, more than any other team in the NPB, However, the last time they had won was in 2012, which was also the last time a Central League team had won. Heading into the series, the CL and PL had both claimed an equal number of championships, each having won 35 times. The Hawks were looking to put the PL ahead for the first time since the Mainichi Orions won the first Japan Series in 1950.

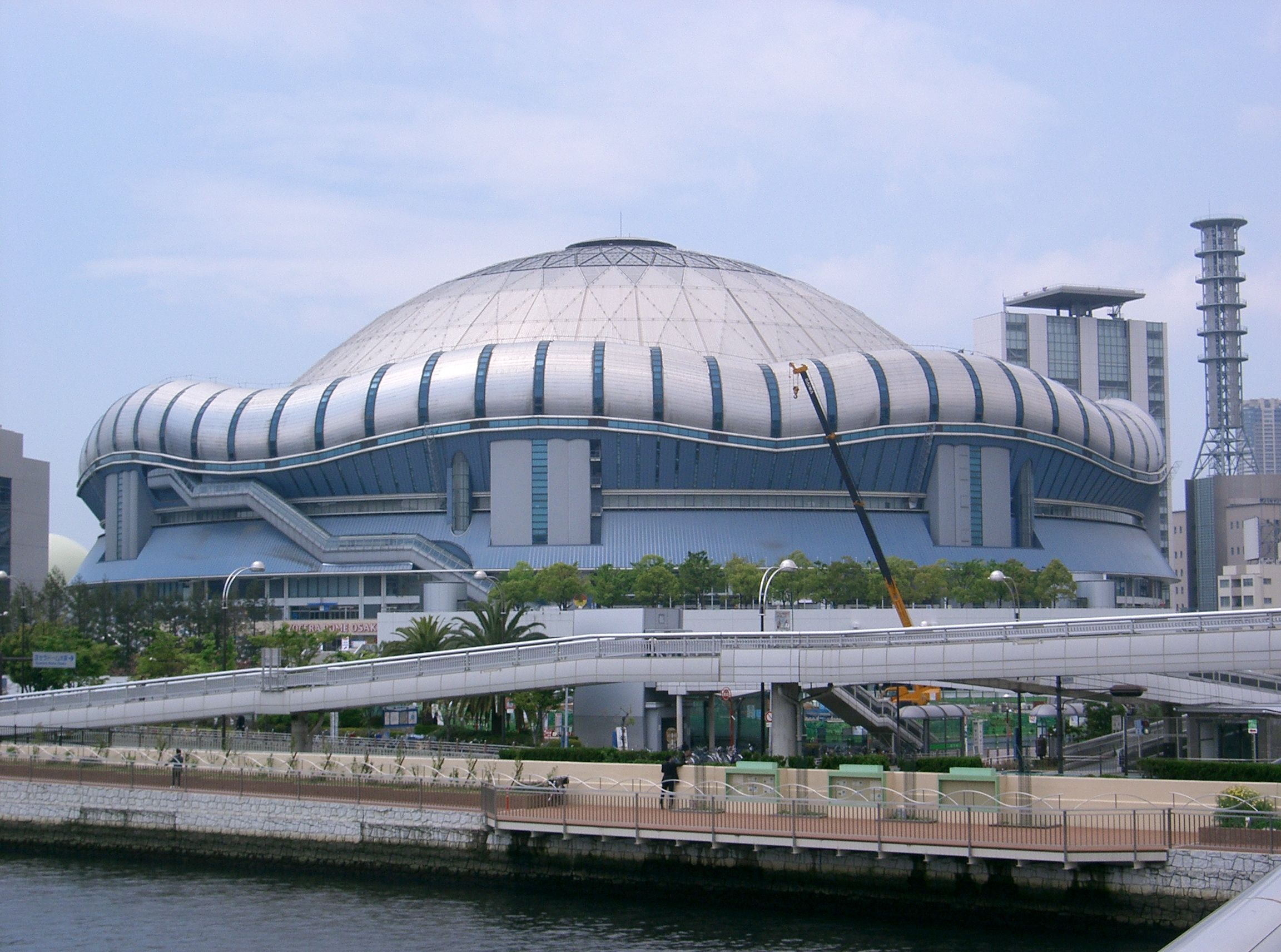
Kyocera Dome Osaka served as the Giants' home field due to a scheduling conflict at Tokyo Dome.

Home field advantage for the Japan Series alternates between the Pacific and Central leagues every year. For this series, it was the CL's turn to receive the advantage, so home field was awarded to the Giants. Due to the COVID-19 pandemic, Nippon Professional Baseball (NPB) pushed back the start of the season from March 20 to June 19 and shortened it from 143 games to 120 games. The change in schedule forced the Japan Series to be postponed from its original November 7–15 schedule. Before the schedule was shifted, however, the Giants' home stadium, Tokyo Dome, was already planned to be used for the Intercity baseball tournament for the period of time that the Japan Series would eventually be rescheduled for. Therefore, because of the scheduling conflict, the Giants' Japan Series home games were instead played at Kyocera Dome Osaka, the PL's Orix Buffaloes home stadium. It was the first time a Japan Series game was held outside either of the two participating teams' home stadiums since the 1980 Japan Series. For the seventh year in a row, Sumitomo Mitsui Banking Corporation (SMBC) sponsored the naming rights for the Japan Series, so it was officially known as the "2020 SMBC Japan Series".

=== COVID-19 measures ===
Along with the All-Star Series, interleague play was removed from the 2020 season to maximize the number of intraleague games that could be played during the pandemic-shortened season. Therefore, the Giants and the Hawks did not play each other during the regular season. Another pandemic-related change enacted during the regular season and the PL Climax Series dictated that games would end in a tie if no winner was determined after ten innings, a change from the usual 12-innings from previous seasons. Games played in the Japan Series, however, will be played through 12 innings if necessary. Two days before the start of the series, NPB also decided to adopt the designated hitter (DH) rule for all games in the series, including games hosted by the Central League team. Typically, games played at the CL team's stadium would require pitchers to bat in accordance with the CL rules. However, with the shortened and condensed season, pitchers had been fatigued more than usual. Also, with interleague play cancelled, PL pitchers never needed to bat all season. Therefore, the DH rule was implemented to lower the risk of injury to pitchers. It was the first time since the 1985 Japan Series that all games in the series featured the DH. In accordance with government guidelines, attendance of the games was limited to 50% of the stadiums' respective capacities. Because of this, the series' total attendance was 69,798, the lowest in Japan Series history. The series started and completed without any outbreaks, but if the series could not be continued due to an outbreak of COVID-19, the team with the most wins at the time would be declared the champions. If the series was tied at the time, the team with the better Team Quality Balance (TQB) (Note: Team Quality Balance is calculated as follows: (runs scored/innings played at bat) – (runs allowed/innings played on defense)) would be declared the champions.

== Summary ==
Fukuoka SoftBank Hawks won the series, 4–0.

| Game | Date | Score | Location | Time | Attendance |
|---|---|---|---|---|---|
| 1 | November 21 | Fukuoka SoftBank Hawks – 5, Yomiuri Giants – 1 | Kyocera Dome Osaka | 3:34 | 16,489 |
| 2 | November 22 | Fukuoka SoftBank Hawks – 13, Yomiuri Giants – 2 | Kyocera Dome Osaka | 3:40 | 16,333 |
| 3 | November 24 | Yomiuri Giants – 0, Fukuoka SoftBank Hawks – 4 | PayPay Dome | 2:58 | 17,297 |
| 4 | November 25 | Yomiuri Giants – 1, Fukuoka SoftBank Hawks – 4 | PayPay Dome | 3:22 | 19,679 |

== Game summaries ==
=== Game 1 ===
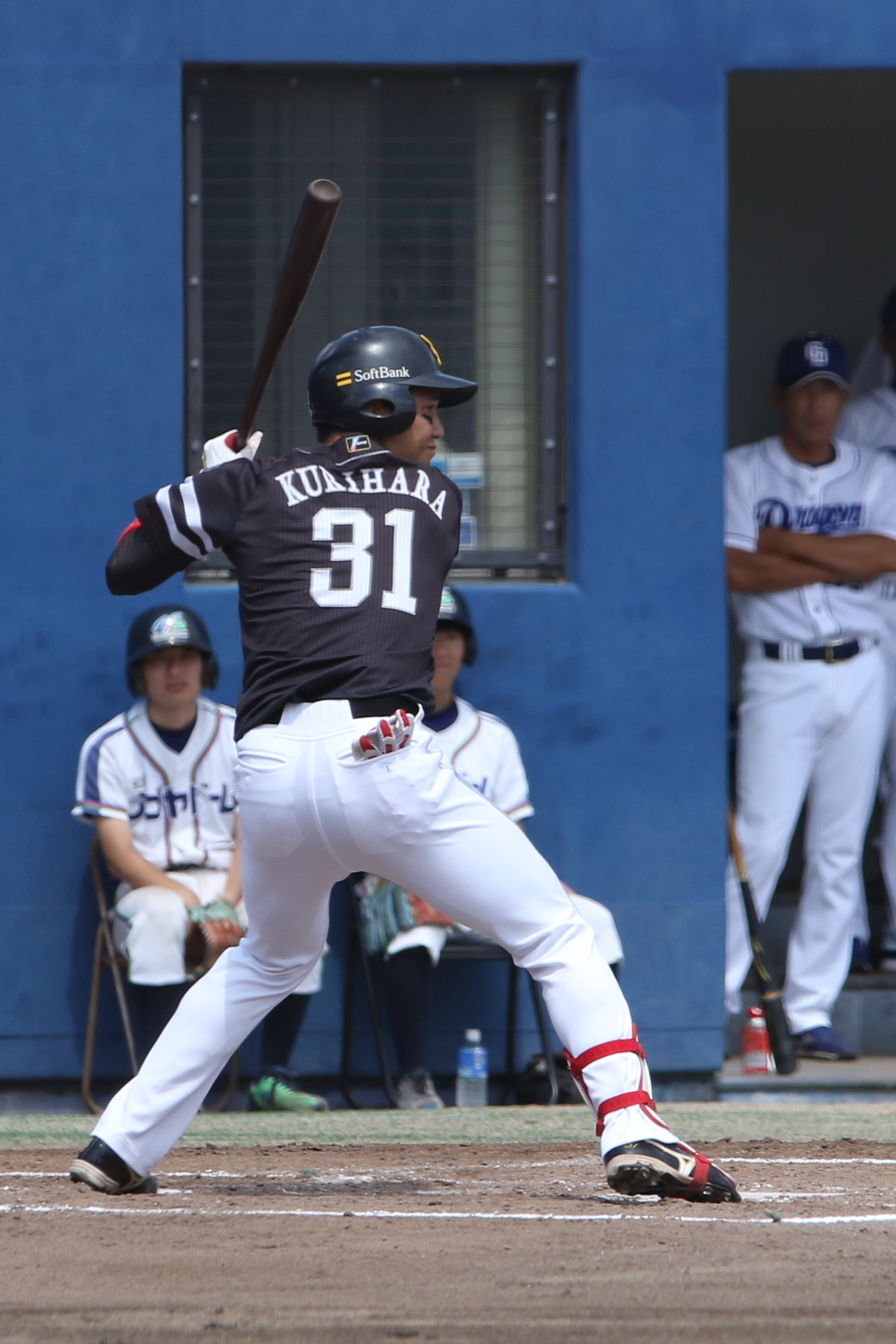
Ryoya Kurihara drove in four runs for the Hawks in their Game 1 win.

Saturday, November 21, 2020, 6:13 pm (JST) at Kyocera Dome Osaka in Osaka, Osaka Prefecture
| Team | 1 | 2 | 3 | 4 | 5 | 6 | 7 | 8 | 9 | R | H | E |
|---|---|---|---|---|---|---|---|---|---|---|---|---|
| SoftBank | 0 | 2 | 0 | 0 | 0 | 2 | 0 | 1 | 0 | 5 | 8 | 0 |
| Yomiuri | 0 | 0 | 0 | 0 | 0 | 0 | 0 | 0 | 1 | 1 | 4 | 0 |
WP: Kodai Senga (1–0) LP: Tomoyuki Sugano (0–1); Home runs: SBH: Ryoya Kurihara (1); YOM: None; Attendance: 16,489; Boxscore

In the first Japan Series game held outside either of the two participating teams' home stadiums since 1980, Tomoyuki Sugano started the game for the Yomiuri Giants. After the Hawks' Yurisbel Gracial singled in the second inning, Sugano gave up a two-run home run to Ryoya Kurihara to give the Hawks the early lead. Kurihara later hit a two-out double in the fourth inning and attempted to score on a single by Alfredo Despaigne, however he was thrown out at the plate to end the inning. Then, with two outs in the sixth inning, Sugano hit Yuki Yanagita and allowed Gracial to reach base with a single. Kurihara then collected two more runs batted in (RBIs) on his second double of the game. Sugano was removed after the inning; it was the first time he had allowed four runs in a start since his second game of the season. Akira Nakamura drove in the Hawks' final run in the eighth inning with an RBI single.

SoftBank starter Kodai Senga lasted seven scoreless innings, striking out six batters and walking three. The Giants had a scoring opportunity in the fourth when he walked two batters to start the inning, however Yoshihiro Maru hit into a double play and Senga retired the next batter. Yomiuri loaded the bases with one out in the ninth inning against Hawks closer Yuito Mori, but they were only able to score one run on a sacrifice fly by Zelous Wheeler. The Hawks' win was their record ninth-straight Japan Series win and their record 13th-straight postseason win.

=== Game 2 ===
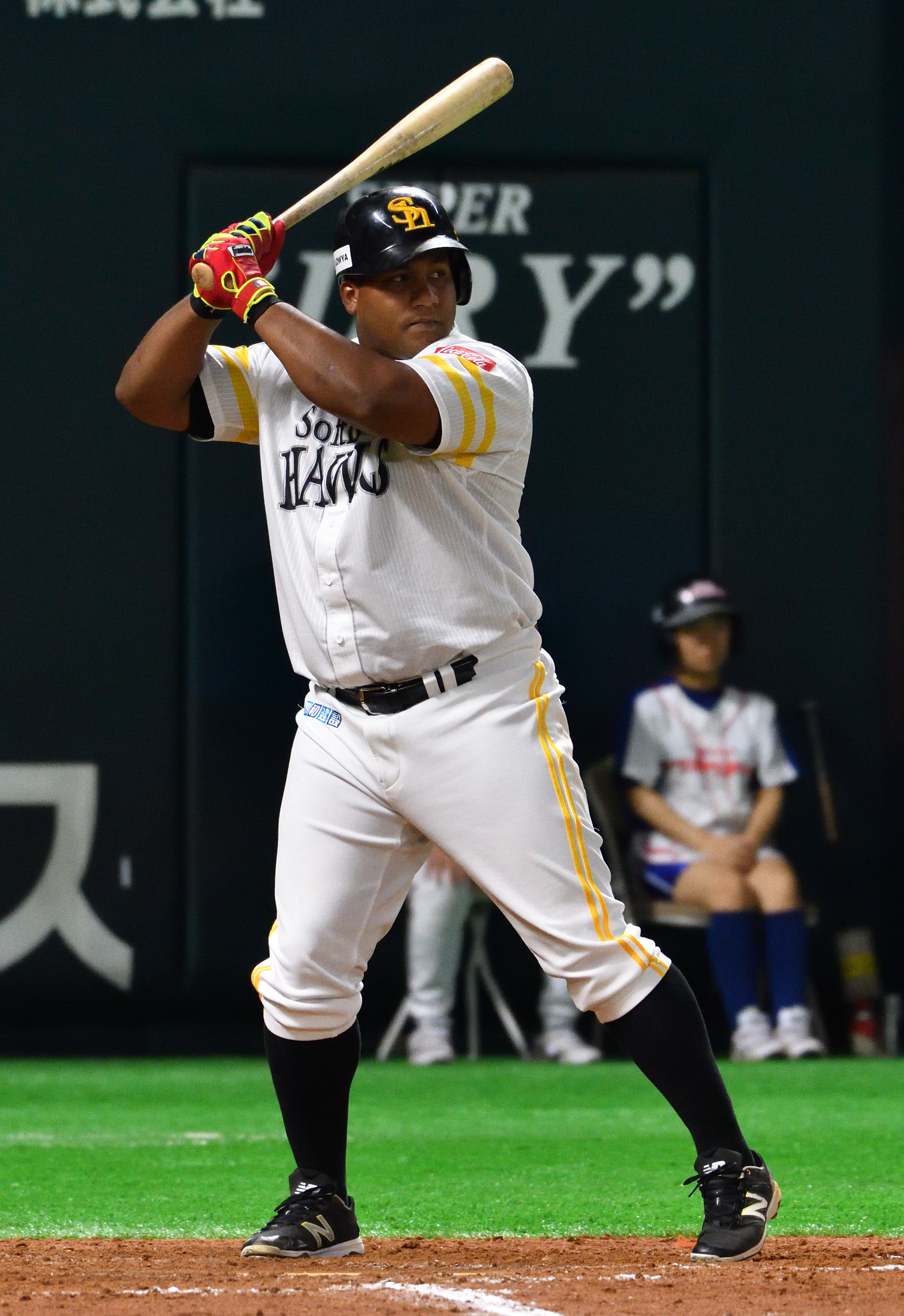
In Game 2, Alfredo Despaigne tied a Japan Series single-game record with six runs batted in.

Sunday, November 22, 2020, 6:11 pm (JST) at Kyocera Dome Osaka in Osaka, Osaka Prefecture
| Team | 1 | 2 | 3 | 4 | 5 | 6 | 7 | 8 | 9 | R | H | E |
|---|---|---|---|---|---|---|---|---|---|---|---|---|
| SoftBank | 3 | 1 | 2 | 0 | 1 | 0 | 4 | 0 | 2 | 13 | 15 | 0 |
| Yomiuri | 0 | 0 | 0 | 0 | 2 | 0 | 0 | 0 | 0 | 2 | 5 | 2 |
WP: Shuta Ishikawa (1–0) LP: Nobutaka Imamura (0–1); Home runs: SBH: Takuya Kai (1), Yurisbel Gracial (1), Alfredo Despaigne (1); YOM: Zelous Wheeler (1); Attendance: 16,333; Boxscore

The Giants' Nobutaka Imamura and the Hawks' Shuta Ishikawa, the starting pitchers, made their first Japan Series starts in game 2. SoftBank immediately took the lead in the first inning after Imamura issued a one-out walk and Yanagita doubled to drive home the game's first run. Then, after catching a ground ball, a wild throw to first base by Yomiuri second baseman Naoki Yoshikawa allowed Gracial to reach the base safely and the second run to score. Another single followed by a Despaigne groundout drove in Gracial for the third Hawks' run of the inning. The Hawks scoring continued next inning when Takuya Kai hit a one-out solo home run to give the Hawks a 4–1 lead. Imamura was replaced later that same inning by regular-season starter Shosei Togo. SoftBank continued to score, however, as Yanagita opened the third inning with a single and Gracial hit a home run to drive him home. After failing to score in the fourth inning, the Hawks bounced back in the fifth when the Giants brought in another regular-season starter, Kazuto Taguchi, to relive Togo. With one out, Taguchi walked Gracial and Kurihara singled before Despaigne's sacrifice fly gave the Hawks their seventh run.

After four scoreless innings, Ishikawa hit Hiroyuki Nakajima with one out and Wheeler gave the Giants their only runs of the night via a two-run home run. Wheeler drove in all three of Yomiuri's runs through the first two games of the series. Ishikawa was removed from the game after giving up back-to-back singles with one out in the sixth inning. He allowed two runs on four hits, a walk and a hit batsman, while striking out seven. The Giants went on to load the bases but didn't score after the Hawks' second reliever of the inning struck out Hiroyuki Nakajima to end the threat. Despaigne, however, capitalized on a bases loaded chance when he hit a grand slam in the seventh inning to put the Hawks ahead by seven. Despaigne's grand slam was the Hawks' first in franchise history in the Japan Series and also allowed him to tie the Japan Series record for the most RBIs in one game, with six. SoftBank added to their lead one last time in the ninth inning when they scored two runs on a throwing error by Giants pitcher Kan Otake. The win extended the Hawks' record consecutive Japan Series win streak to ten games.

=== Game 3 ===
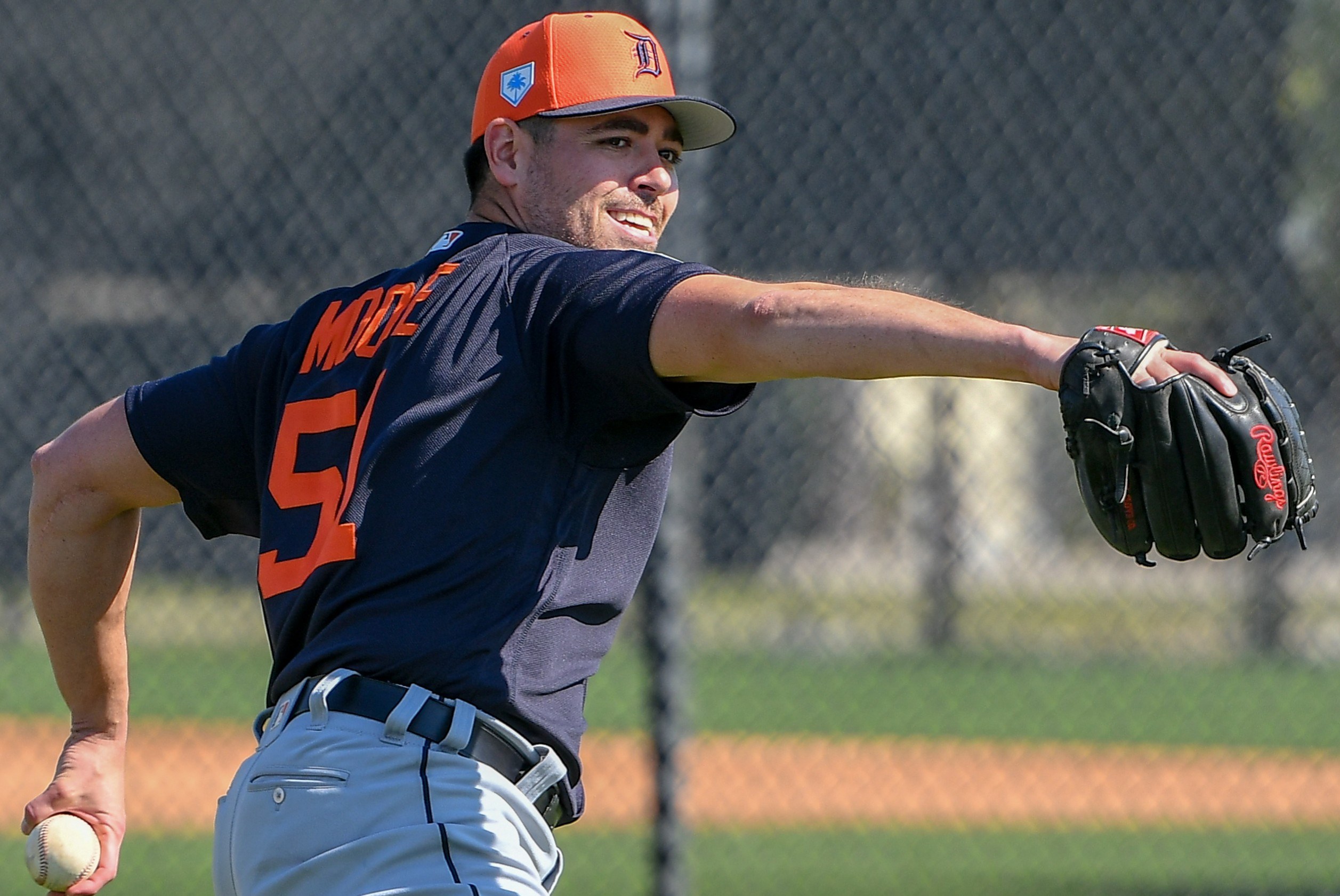
Matt Moore didn't allow a hit through seven innings.

Tuesday, November 24, 2020, 6:33 pm (JST) at Fukuoka PayPay Dome in Fukuoka, Fukuoka Prefecture
| Team | 1 | 2 | 3 | 4 | 5 | 6 | 7 | 8 | 9 | R | H | E |
|---|---|---|---|---|---|---|---|---|---|---|---|---|
| Yomiuri | 0 | 0 | 0 | 0 | 0 | 0 | 0 | 0 | 0 | 0 | 1 | 1 |
| SoftBank | 0 | 0 | 2 | 0 | 0 | 0 | 2 | 0 | X | 4 | 8 | 2 |
WP: Matt Moore (1–0) LP: Ángel Sánchez (0–1); Home runs: YOM: None; SBH: Akira Nakamura (1); Attendance: 17,297; Boxscore

In Game 3, Matt Moore started for SoftBank and Ángel Sánchez for Yomiuri. Sánchez retired eight of the first nine Hawks batters he faced before allowing a two-out single in the third inning. Akira Nakamura then put the Hawks ahead with a two-run home run. Sánchez didn't allow another run into the sixth inning when the Giants intentionally loaded the bases with only one out. Giants second baseman Naoki Yoshikawa, however, made an impressive defensive play to save runs and end the inning. The next inning, Sanchez was removed from the game after allowing a single and a sacrifice. Relief pitcher Yuhei Takanashi then went on to hit a batter and allow Nakamura to hit an RBI single, his third RBI of the night. Kan Otake replaced Takanashi but gave up an RBI single to Yurisbel Gracial to extend the Hawks' lead to 4–0.

After doubling their lead in the bottom of the seventh inning, Hawks manager Kimiyasu Kudo made the decision to pull Moore from the game after throwing 93 pitches despite him having a no-hitter at the time. No pitcher has thrown a complete game no-hitter in Japan Series history, however the Chunichi Dragons made a similar decision in the 2007 Japan Series when Daisuke Yamai after eight perfect innings in Game 5 that resulted in a combined perfect game. In addition to not allowing any hits, Moore pitched seven scoreless innings, struck out five, walked two, and two batters reached base on errors against him. Livan Moinelo, Moore's relief, hit one batter and walked another in the eighth inning but kept the no-hitter intact by striking out three Giants hitters. Hawks closer Mori then picked up two outs in the ninth inning before giving up a single to Yoshihiro Maru, the Giants' first and only hit of the game. Game 3 extended three Hawks win streaks: 11 consecutive Japan Series games, 15 consecutive Japan Series games at home, and 15 consecutive postseason games.

=== Game 4 ===
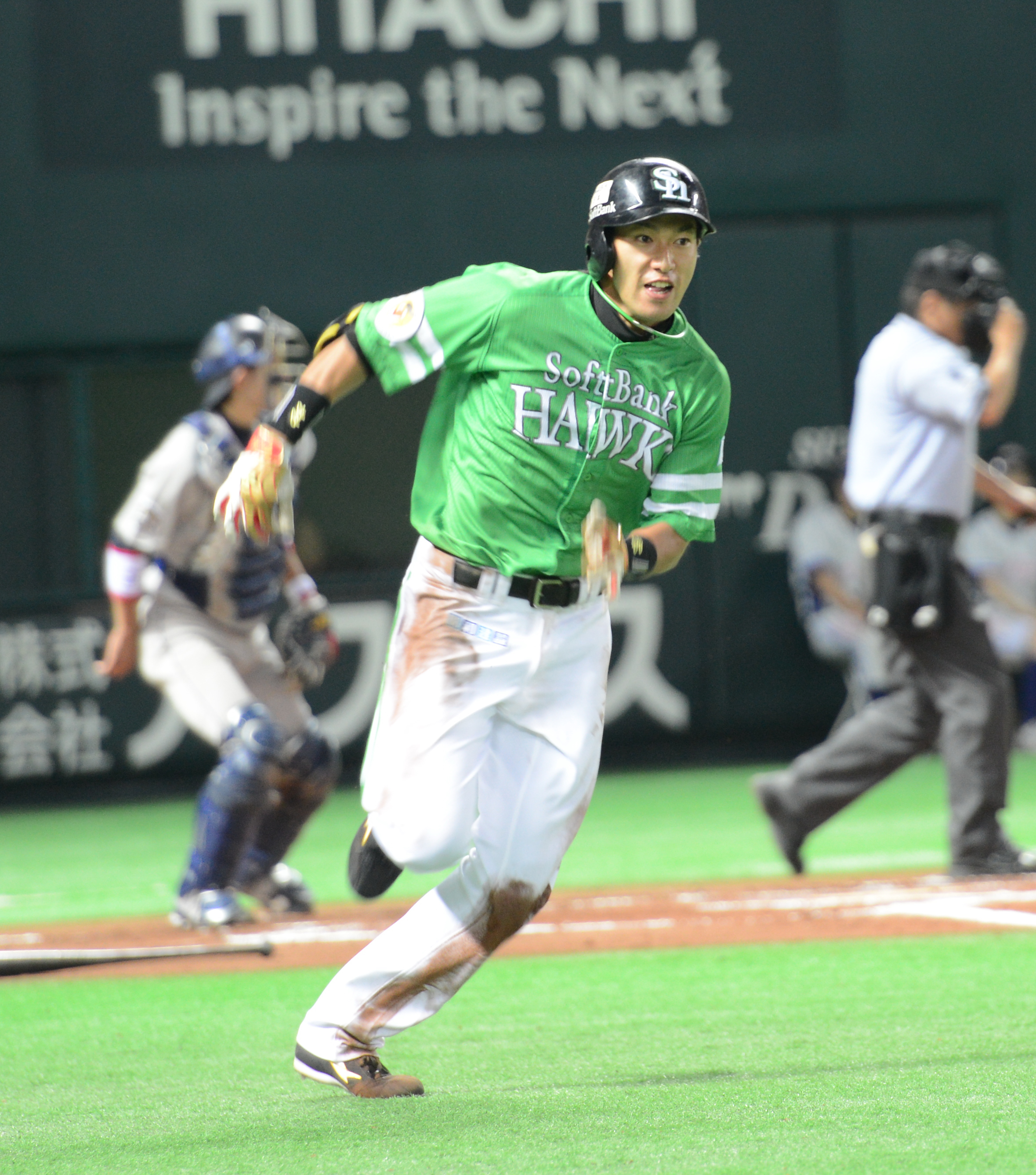
Yuki Yanagita hit a two-run home run in Game 4.

Wednesday, November 25, 2020, 6:34 pm (JST) at Fukuoka PayPay Dome in Fukuoka, Fukuoka Prefecture
| Team | 1 | 2 | 3 | 4 | 5 | 6 | 7 | 8 | 9 | R | H | E |
|---|---|---|---|---|---|---|---|---|---|---|---|---|
| Yomiuri | 1 | 0 | 0 | 0 | 0 | 0 | 0 | 0 | 0 | 1 | 6 | 0 |
| SoftBank | 2 | 2 | 0 | 0 | 0 | 0 | 0 | 0 | X | 4 | 5 | 0 |
WP: Yuki Matsumoto (1–0) LP: Seishu Hatake (0–1) Sv: Yuito Mori (1); Home runs: YOM: None; SBH: Yuki Yanagita (1), Takuya Kai (2); Attendance: 19,679; Boxscore

In the top of first inning in Game 4, Akihiro Wakabayashi hit a leadoff double off of SoftBank starter Tsuyoshi Wada. Hayato Sakamoto followed with a double of his own, driving in Wakabayashi and giving the Giants their first lead of the series. The Hawks quickly took the lead back, however, in the bottom half of the inning when Yuki Yanagita hit a two-run home run off of Giants starter Seishu Hatake. Takuya Kai extended the Hawks' lead in the second inning with a two-out, two-run home run. The home run, Kai's second of the series, resulted in Hatake's removal from the game. Wada, likewise, had a short start for the Hawks, lasting only two innings. Yomiuri reliever Shosei Togo took the mound in the third inning and retired seven of eight batters faced. Yuki Matsumoto replaced Wada in the third and went on to strike out four over 2 2/3 innings and earned the win. Neither team allowed a runner past first base from the fifth inning until the ninth inning, when SoftBank closer Yuito Mori allowed a walk and a single with one out. The Giants did not capitalize on their final opportunity, however, as Mori struck out Shunta Tanaka and Yoshiyuki Kamei flied out.

Postgame, Ryoya Kurihara was named the Japan Series Most Valuable Player. The Hawks' win completed their second straight Japan Series sweep of the Giants. The Japan Series title was SoftBank's fourth straight, the first Pacific League team to achieve the feat and the first since the Giants, who won nine straight from 1965 to 1973. Through the end of the series, the Hawks had won their last 12 Japan Series games, their last 16 home games in the Japan Series, and their last 16 postseason games. The Giants' .132 batting average in the series was the lowest in Japan Series history and the loss was their ninth consecutive Japan Series loss, tying the record.

== See also ==
- 2020 Korean Series
- 2020 World Series
- Impact of the COVID-19 pandemic on sports
