= Kodai Senga =

Japanese baseball player (born 1993)

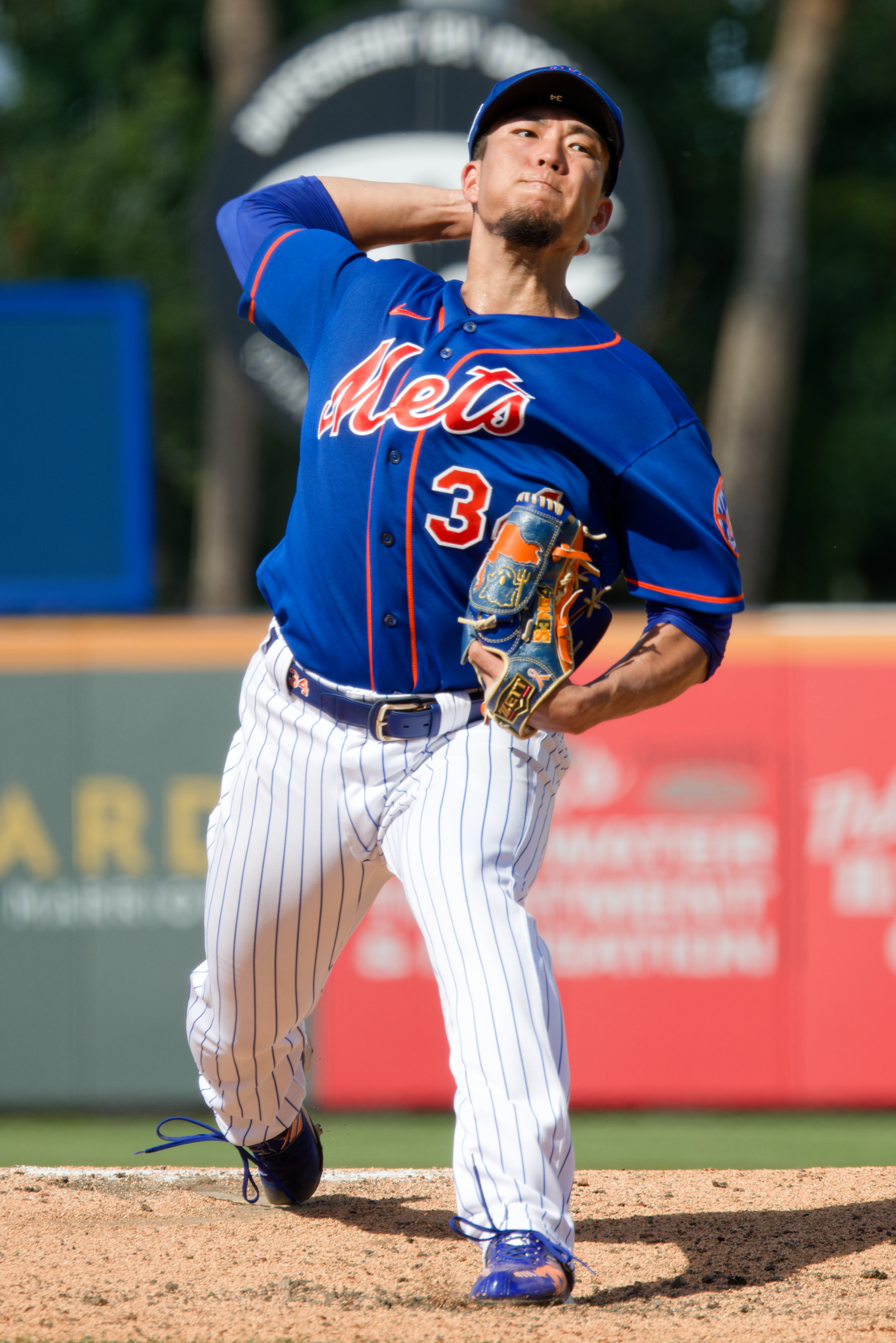
- Senga with the Mets in 2023

New York Mets – No. 34
- Pitcher
- Born: January 30, 1993 (age 33); Gamagōri, Aichi, Japan
- Bats: Left Throws: Right

Professional debut
- NPB: April 30, 2012, for the Fukuoka SoftBank Hawks
- MLB: April 2, 2023, for the New York Mets

NPB statistics (through 2022 season)
- Win–loss record: 87–44
- Earned run average: 2.59
- Strikeouts: 1,252

MLB statistics (through 2026 season)
- Win–loss record: 20–22
- Earned run average: 3.77
- Strikeouts: 395
- Stats at Baseball Reference

Teams
- Fukuoka SoftBank Hawks (2012–2022); New York Mets (2023–present)

Career highlights and awards
- NPB: 3× NPB All-Star (2013, 2017, 2019); 5× Japan Series champion (2015, 2017–2020); Japanese Triple Crown (2020); 2× Pacific League strikeout leader (2019, 2020); Pacific League ERA leader (2020); Pacific League winning percentage leader (2017); Pacific League wins champion (2020); 2× Pacific League Best Nine Award (2019, 2020); 2× Mitsui Golden Glove Award (2019, 2020); Pitched a no-hitter on September 6, 2019; Gamagōri City Sports Honor Award (2017); MLB: All-Star (2023)
Medals
Men's baseball
Representing Japan
Summer Olympics
Gold medal – first place	2020 Tokyo	Team

Kodai Senga (千賀 滉大, Senga Kōdai; born January 30, 1993) is a Japanese professional baseball pitcher for the New York Mets of Major League Baseball (MLB). He made his MLB debut in 2023 and Nippon Professional Baseball (NPB) debut in 2012 for the Fukuoka SoftBank Hawks. He is a three-time NPB All-Star and a one-time MLB All-Star. Internationally, Senga represents the Japanese national team.

== Early life ==
Senga was born in Gamagori, Aichi Prefecture, where he started playing rubber-ball baseball as a third baseman until he graduated from middle school, then switched from third baseman to pitcher due to the manager of Gamagori High School baseball club, who saw the quality of Senga's throwing fitting more as a pitcher. Although Senga and his team never made it to either Japanese High School Baseball Championship or Japanese High School Baseball Invitational Tournament in Koshien Stadium, the owner of a sporting goods store in Nagoya recommended Senga to Kazuo Ogawa, then-the scout manager of Fukuoka Softbank Hawks, as a potential player to be drafted.

== Professional career ==
=== Fukuoka SoftBank Hawks ===
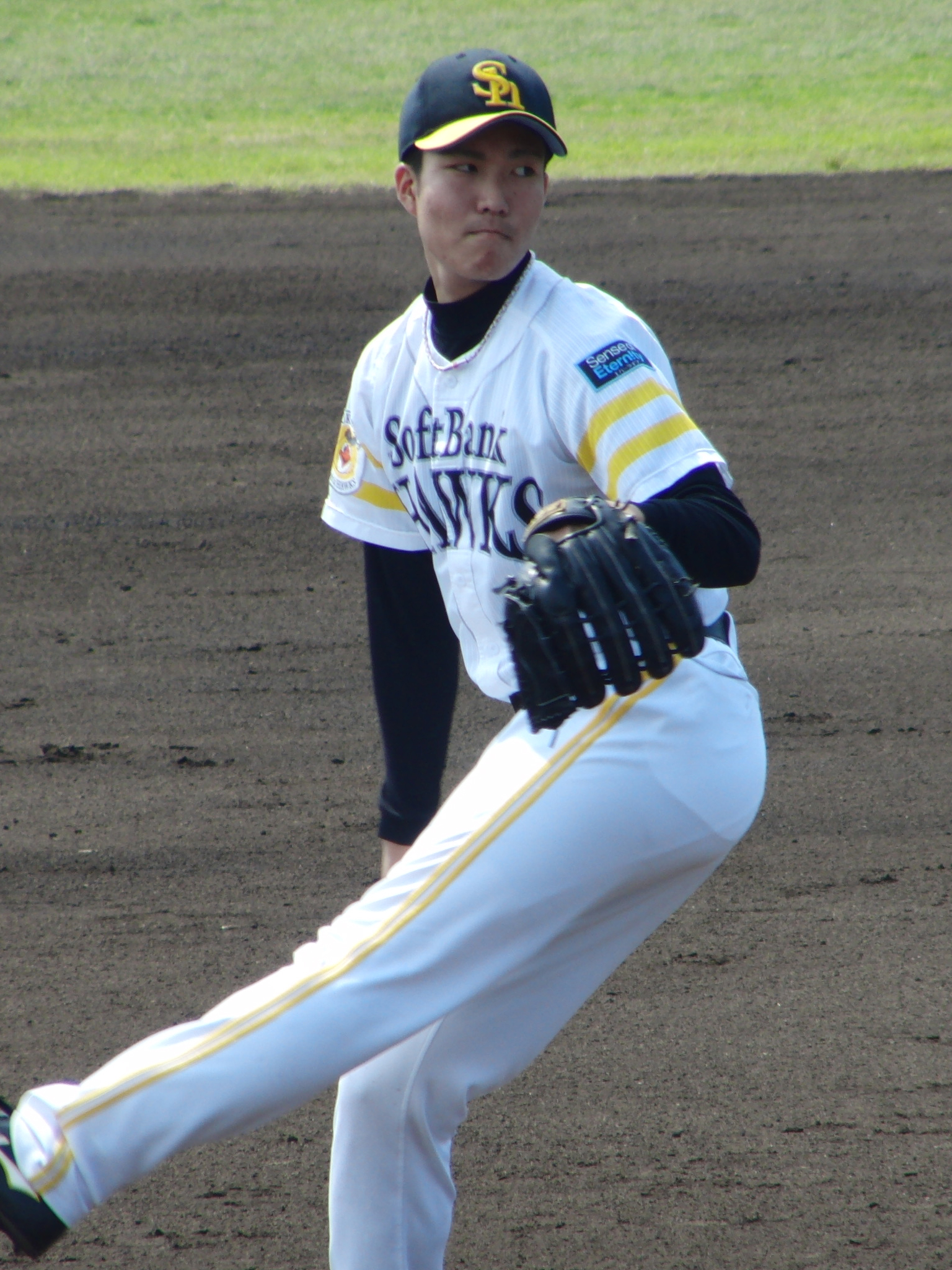
Senga with the Hawks in 2012

On October 28, 2010, Senga was drafted as a developmental player by the Fukuoka Softbank Hawks in the 2010 Nippon Professional Baseball draft with Takuya Kai and Taisei Makihara.

==== 2011–2015 ====
From 2011 to mid-2012, he played in informal matches against the Shikoku Island League Plus's teams, other amateur baseball teams, and played in the Western League of NPB's second league.

On April 23, 2012, he signed a 4.4 million yen contract with the Fukuoka SoftBank Hawks as a registered player under control. On April 30, Senga debuted in the Pacific League against the Chiba Lotte Marines as a starter. In 2012 season, he pitched two games in the Pacific League.

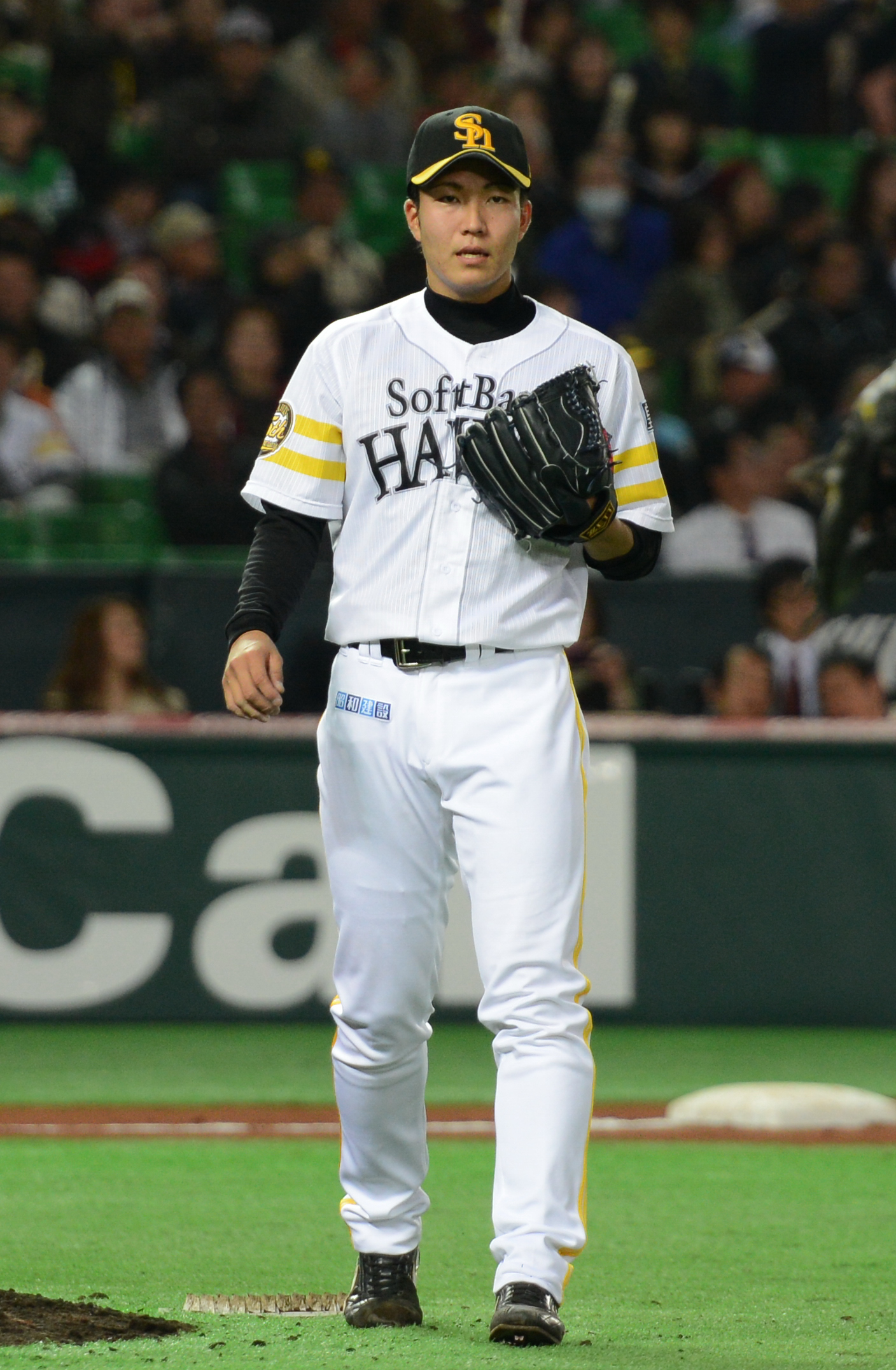
Senga in 2013

In a game against the Saitama Seibu Lions on May 12, 2013, Senga pitched as a relief pitcher and obtained his first win as a pitcher. In the 2013 season, he tied the Pacific League record of consecutive no-Run innings (34 1/3 innings) by a relief pitcher. On July 19, he participated in the All-Star Game for the first time in MAZADA All-Star Game 2013. On September 4, he left the team with a strain on his left flank and spent the rest of the season rehabilitating. Senga recorded 51 Games pitched, a 1–4 Win–loss record, a 2.40 ERA, 17 Holds, one save, and 85 strikeouts in 56.1 innings.

In the 2014 season, Senga pitched as a reliever, but on June 15 he hurt his right shoulder and spent the rest of the season rehabilitating his right shoulder. He finished the regular season with a 19 Games pitched, a 1–1 Win–loss record, a 1.99 ERA, 3 Holds, and 28 strikeouts in 22.2 innings.

In the 2015 season, Senga pitched in the Pacific League in August, partly due to the rehabilitation of his right shoulder. On August 19, he got his first win as a starting pitcher, finishing the regular season with 4 Games pitched, a 2–1 Win–loss record, a 0.40 ERA, and 21 strikeouts in 22.1 innings. In the 2015 Japan Series against the Tokyo Yakult Swallows, he relief pitched in Games 3 and 4.

==== 2016–2020 ====
In the 2016 season, Senga pitched as a starting pitcher and finished the regular season with 25 Games pitched, a 12–3 Win–loss record, a 2.61 ERA, and 181 strikeouts in 169 innings. The 12 wins in the regular season were the most wins for a pitcher drafted as a developmental squad player and became an NPB record.

On July 14, 2017, Senga participated in the mynavi All-Star Game for the 2nd time in his career. In the 2017 season, he finished the regular season with a 13–4 Win–loss record, a 2.64 ERA, 151 strikeouts in 143 innings and won the 2017 Pacific League Winning percentage Championship (.765 Winning percentage). In the 2017 Japan Series against the Yokohama DeNA BayStars, he was the first pitcher from the developmental player to pitch as a starting pitcher in the opening game. Senga and Kai's battery were the first to win the Japan Series as players who were drafted as developmental players.

In the opening game of the 2018 season against the Orix Buffaloes on March 30, 2018, Senga pitched his first Opening Day game as a starter. On August 17, in the match against the Orix Buffaloes, he achieved his first shutout game. Senga finished the regular season with 22 Games pitched, a 13–7 Win–loss record, a 3.51 ERA, and 163 strikeouts in 141 innings. In the 2018 Japan Series against the Hiroshima Toyo Carp, he pitched in Game 1 and Game 5 as a starting pitcher and contributed to the team's second consecutive Japan Series championship, as well as their 4th in 5 years.

In 2019, Senga attempted unsuccessfully to get the Hawks to post him to Major League Baseball. The Hawks are the only NPB team to have never posted a player since the posting system was implemented in 1998. On July 12, 2019, Senga participated in the mynavi All-Star Game 2019 for the 3rd time. On September 6, 2019, he pitched the second no-hitter in Hawks history, the first no-hitter for the Hawks since 1943. Senga finished the regular season with 26 Games pitched, a 13–8 Win–loss record, a 2.79 ERA, and 227 strikeouts in 180.1 innings. In the 2019 Japan Series against the Yomiuri Giants, he became the winning pitcher in Game 1 and contributed to the team's third consecutive Japan Series championship. On November 26, Senga was honored for the Pacific League strikeout leader Award, Mitsui Golden Glove Award, and Pacific League Best Nine Award at the NPB AWARD 2019.

In the match against the Chiba Lotte Marines on November 4, 2020, Senga recorded a total of 1,000 strikeouts. In the 2020 season, Senga finished the regular season with 18 Games pitched, an 11–6 Win–loss record, a 2.16 ERA, and 149 strikeouts in 121 innings. In the 2020 Japan Series against the Yomiuri Giants, he has pitched as a starting pitcher in the opening game of the Japan Series for the fourth consecutive year, being the first pitcher to do so since Tsuneo Horiuchi, and became the winning pitcher with no runs in seven innings, contributing to the team's fourth consecutive Japan Series championship. Senga topped the Pacific League in Win–loss record, ERA and strikeouts and was honored at the Pacific League for the Most Wins Champion Award, Pacific League ERA leader Award and Pacific League strikeout leader Award, earning him a pitching triple crown, at the NPB Awards 2020 on December 17. He also won his second Best Nine Award and Golden Glove Award for the second consecutive year. Despite the triple crown performance, his 11 wins (tied for most in Pacific League in 2020 between him, Shuta Ishikawa, and Hideaki Wakui), 2.16 ERA (which was beaten by Yūdai Ōno with a 1.82 ERA), and 149 strikeouts (most in NPB) were not enough to receive the Eiji Sawamura Award. Following the conclusion of the 2020 season, Senga once again failed to get the Hawks to post him, instead obtaining a 100 million yen raise for the 2021 season.

==== 2021–2022 ====
Senga was once again marred by injuries in 2021 as the Hawks failed to make the postseason for the first time since 2013. However, he still managed a 10-3 record in 13 games pitched, a 2.66 ERA, and 90 strikeouts in 84.2 innings pitched. In the offseason, he signed a 5-year extension with an opt-out clause after the first season of the contract, as Senga would obtain International Free Agent rights following the conclusion of the 2022 season.

In 2022, Senga went 11-6 in 22 games pitched, a personal best 1.94 ERA (as a starter), and 156 strikeouts in 144 innings pitched as the Hawks returned to the postseason but lost the Pacific League pennant to the Orix Buffaloes via tiebreaker. In the 2022 Pacific League Climax Series, Senga pitched 12 scoreless innings in two starts, helping propel the Hawks past the Lions in the First Stage and preventing the Hawks from getting swept by the Buffaloes in the Final Stage. Following the Pacific League Climax Series, Senga formally announced his intentions to exercise his international free agent rights and play in Major League Baseball in 2023.

=== New York Mets ===
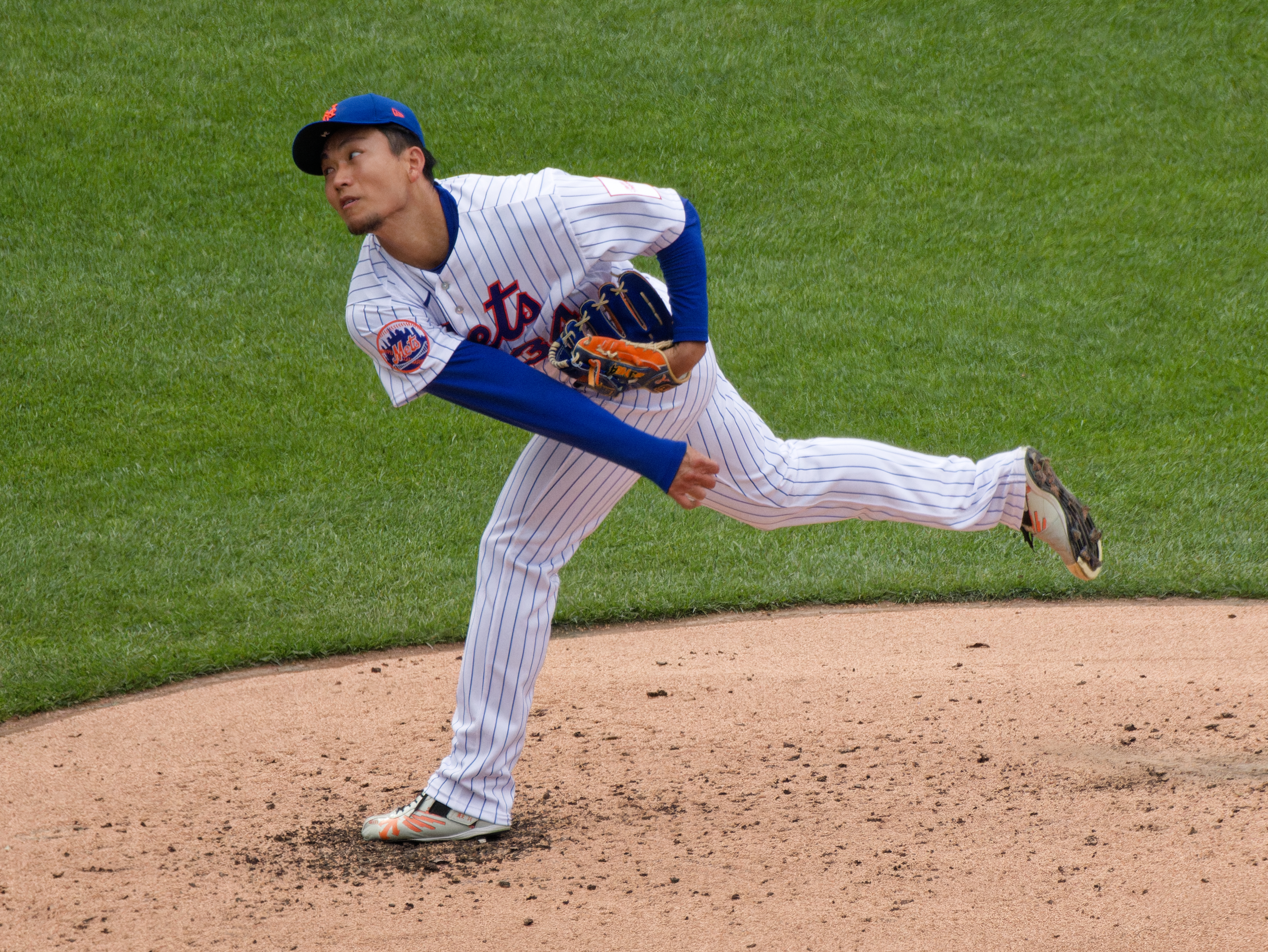
Senga with the Mets in 2023

On December 17, 2022, Senga signed a five-year, $75 million contract with the New York Mets.

==== 2023 ====
On April 2, 2023, Senga made his major league debut against the Miami Marlins. He earned his first career victory after pitching 5^{1}/_{3} innings, giving up one run and striking out eight in a 5–1 Mets win. On May 17, Senga struck out 12 batters in a game against the Tampa Bay Rays, setting a new Mets franchise record in strikeouts by a Japanese pitcher. He was named to the 2023 National League All-Star team on July 8, replacing Marcus Stroman of the Chicago Cubs. On September 27, during a game against the Marlins, Senga recorded his 200th strikeout of the season, becoming the first Mets rookie since Dwight Gooden to accomplish the feat. In Senga's stellar rookie season, he made 29 starts for the Mets, posting a 12–7 record, a 2.98 ERA, and 202 strikeouts across 166^{1}/_{3} innings pitched.

Senga finished second in voting for the 2023 National League Rookie of the Year Award. He also finished seventh in voting for the National League Cy Young Award.

==== 2024 ====
On February 22, 2024, the Mets announced that Senga had been diagnosed with a moderate posterior capsule strain in his throwing shoulder and would begin the season on the injured list. He was transferred to the 60-day IL on April 10. Senga was activated from the injured list on July 26 and made his first start of the season that evening against the Atlanta Braves. He pitched 5 1/3 innings, allowing two runs and striking out nine batters, but suffered a high grade calf strain in the fifth inning, forcing his return to the injured list. On September 22, Mets manager Carlos Mendoza announced that Senga would be officially shut down for the remainder of the season. However, on October 4, it was announced that he would be the Game 1 starter in the 2024 National League Division Series against the Philadelphia Phillies, scheduled for the following night. Senga struggled in the 2024 MLB postseason, as he posted a 12.60 ERA with 4 strikeouts across 5 innings pitched in 3 appearances.

==== 2025 ====
Senga was put on the 15-day injured list on June 12, 2025, after suffering from a hamstring injury during a 4–3 home victory over the Washington Nationals. Before landing on the IL, Senga was leading the majors with a 1.47 ERA across 13 starts, and was well on his way to a second career All-Star appearance. However, Senga struggled to a 6.56 ERA upon his return, before being sent to Triple-A on September 5. Across 22 games started in 2025, Senga posted a 7–6 record, a 3.02 ERA, and 109 strikeouts across 113^{1}/_{3} innings pitched.

==== 2026 ====
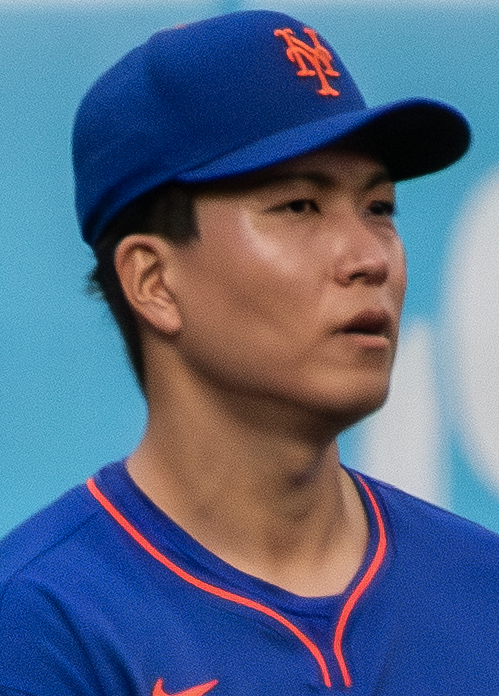
Senga with the Mets in 2026

On April 28, 2026, Senga was placed back on the injured list with spine inflammation after posting a 17.28 ERA on his prior three starts. He was reinstated on June 16. On June 24, the Mets announced that Senga would be moving to the bullpen after posting a 10.08 ERA across his first seven starts of the season.

On August 10, Senga earned his first save of his career in an 8–5 victory over the Atlanta Braves. Overall in 2026, Senga recorded an 0–9 record with a 7.34 ERA and 75 strikeouts across 31 games. As a starter, Senga pitched to an 0-7 record and a 9.66 ERA, but after moving to the bullpen he improved to a 3.78 ERA and recorded eight saves.

== International career ==
Senga represented the Japan national baseball team in the 2016 exhibition games against Mexico and Netherlands and 2017 World Baseball Classic.

In the 2017 World Baseball Classic, following the conclusion of the tournament, he was named to the 2017 All-World Baseball Classic team.

On October 1, 2019, he was selected at the 2019 WBSC Premier12. But he canceled his participation because of the accumulation of fatigue in the regular season.

On July 5, 2020, he was selected to play for the Japanese national baseball team at the 2020 Summer Olympics. He became a gold medalist by beating the United States in the final round, allowing no runs in two games.

== Playing style ==
Senga is a 6 ft 1 in, 202 lb right-handed pitcher. With a three-quarters delivery he throws a fastball averaging nearly 96 mph (tops out at 164 kph/101.9 mph in NPB), a deceptive forkball, a cutter, a slider, and an occasional curveball. Due to the effectiveness of his forkball, the pitch has been nicknamed "ghost fork(ball)" in Japan. His forkball is also referenced in his pitching glove, which features a graphic of a ghost holding a pitchfork.
