= Ryoya Kurihara =

Japanese baseball player (born 1996)

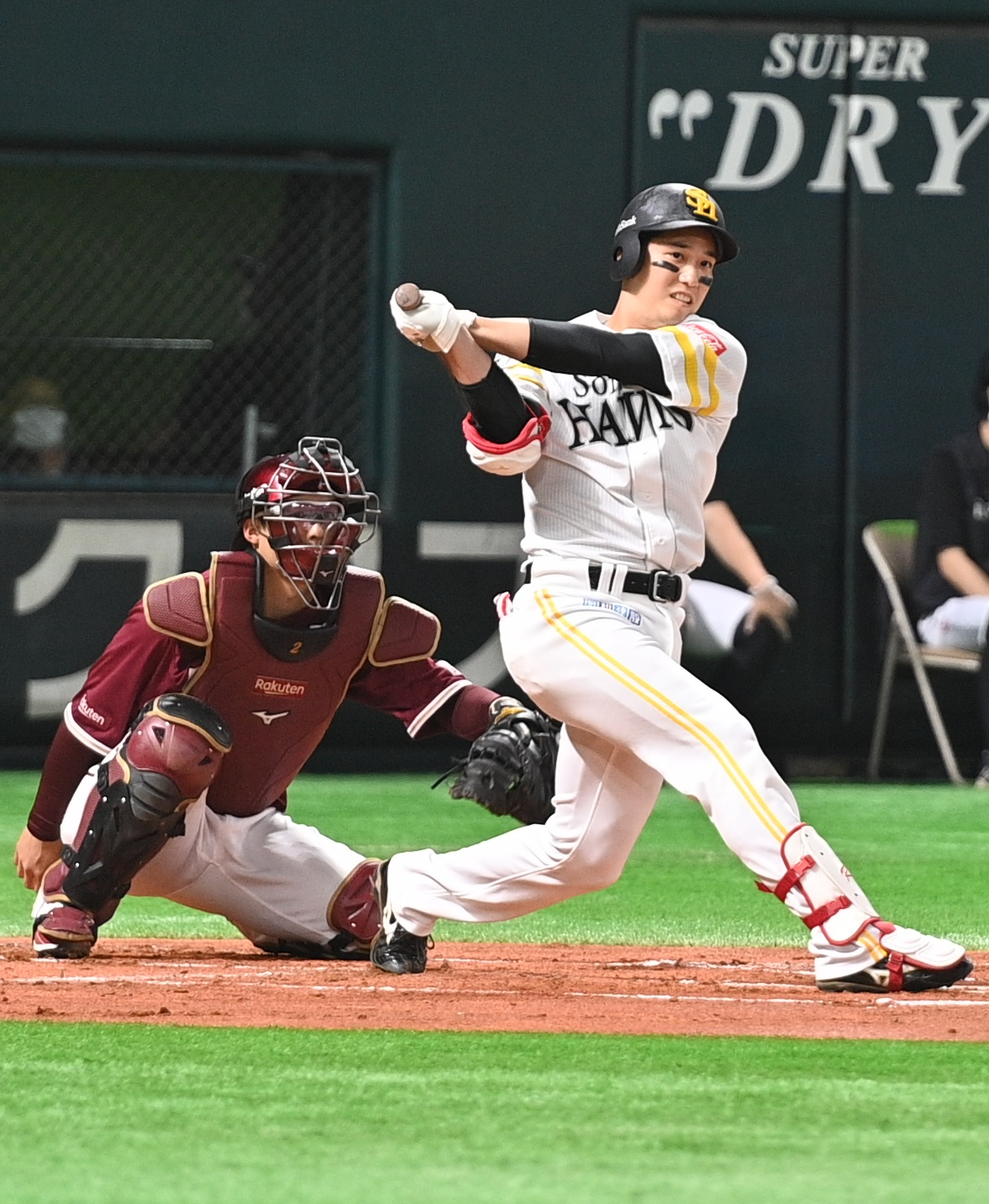
- Kurihara with the Fukuoka SoftBank Hawks

Fukuoka SoftBank Hawks – No. 24
- Catcher / Infielder / Outfielder
- Born: July 4, 1996 (age 29); Fukui, Fukui, Japan
- Bats: Left Throws: Right

NPB debut
- June 13, 2017, for the Fukuoka SoftBank Hawks

NPB statistics (through 2025 season)
- Batting average: .260
- Home runs: 83
- Runs batted in: 338
- Stats at Baseball Reference

Teams
- Fukuoka SoftBank Hawks (2017–present)

Career highlights and awards
- 5× Japan Series champion (2017–2020, 2025); Japan Series MVP (2020); Pacific League Best Nine Award (2024); Pacific League Golden Glove Award (2024); 3× NPB All-Star (2021, 2023, 2024)
Medals
Men's baseball
Representing Japan
Summer Olympics
Gold medal – first place	2020 Tokyo	Team
WBSC Premier12
Silver medal – second place	2024	Team
Asian Junior Baseball Championship
Silver medal – second place	2014, Bangkok, Thailand	Team

Ryoya Kurihara (栗原 陵矢, Kurihara Ryōya; born July 4, 1996) is a Japanese professional baseball catcher, infielder, and outfielder for the Fukuoka SoftBank Hawks of Nippon Professional Baseball (NPB).

== Early baseball career ==
As a catcher at Fukui Prefectural Harue Technical High School, Ryoya Kurihara participated in the 1st grade autumn 43rd Meiji Jingu Baseball Championship and in the 2nd grade spring 85th Japanese High School Baseball Invitational Tournament. In 2014, he was selected to the Japan national baseball team in the 2014 Asian Junior Baseball Championship.

== Professional career ==
=== 2015-2020 season ===
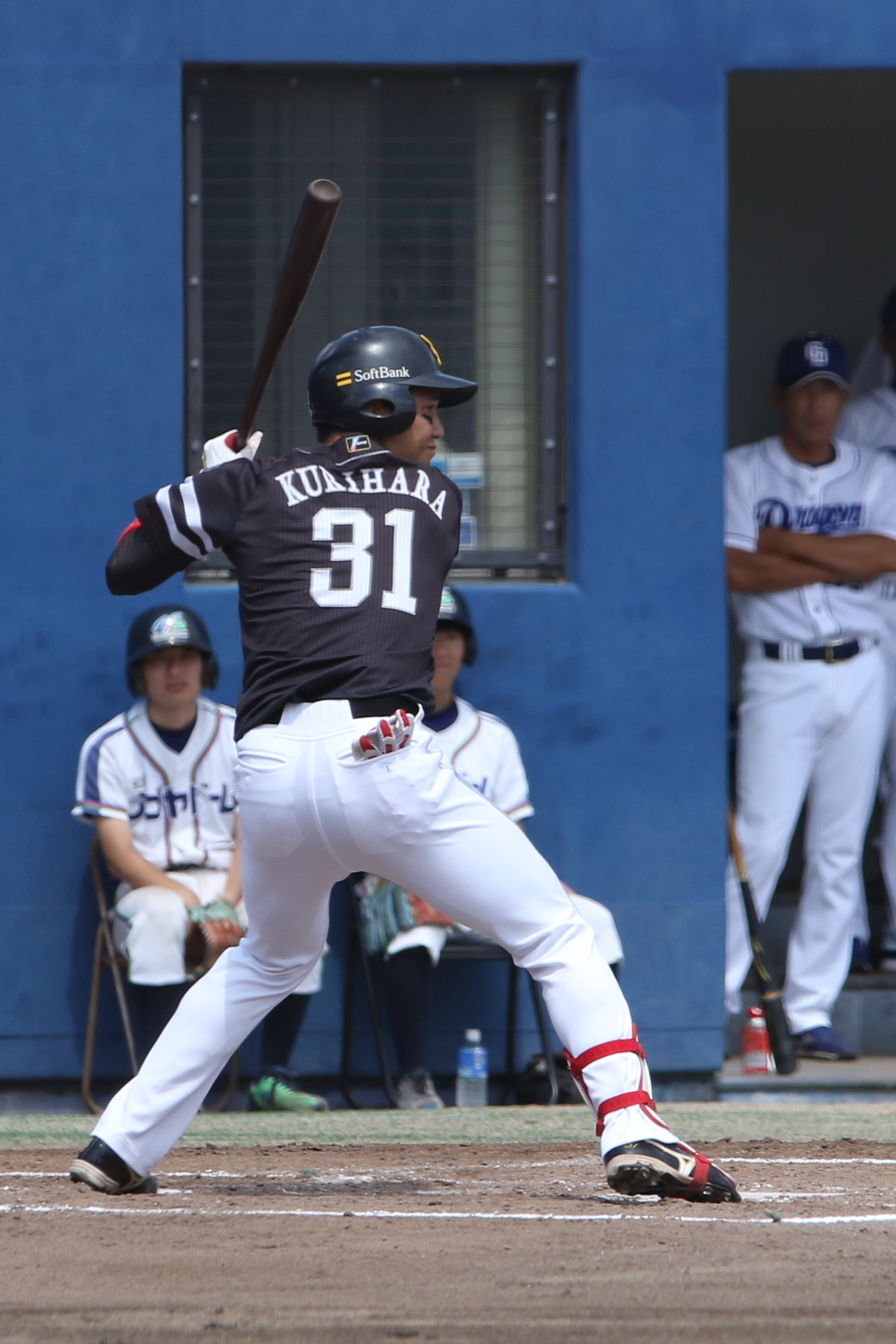
Kurihara in the 2019 uniform number 31 era

Kurihara was drafted in the second round by the Fukuoka SoftBank Hawks in the 2014 draft. He and the Hawks agreed to a ¥7 million annual salary. From 2015 to 2016 he played on SoftBank's minor league teams in NPB's Western League.

He made his Hawks debut in an interleague game against the Yomiuri Giants on June 13, 2017. And he was selected as the Japan Series roster in the 2017 Japan Series, however he did not play. In February 2018, Kurihara dislocated his left shoulder during spring training. He returned from the injury on August 10 and recorded his first hit on September 5. He was again selected to the Japan Series roster in 2018 in which he recorded a sacrifice bunt as a pinch hitter. On July 23, 2019, Kurihara recorded his first home run. Again, he was selected as roster in the 2019 Japan Series.

Kurihara played in 118 of 120 games in the 2020 season. In the Japan Series, he went 3-for-3 with a home run and four RBIs in Game 1 and 4-for-5 in Game 2, becoming only the 23rd player to record four hits in a Japan Series game. After the Hawks swept the Giants to win the series, Kurihara was named Japan Series MVP.

=== 2021 season-present ===
In 2021 season, Kurihara had been on a roll since the opening game, and as of May 2, he was third in the league with a .319 batting average. On June 30, He hit his 10th home run of the season against the Saitama Seibu Lions. He was selected for the NPB All-Star Game for the first time and became the first player in NPB All-Star history to play four positions in one game: third baseman, left fielder, catcher, and first baseman in the Mynavi All-Star Game 2021 Game 2 on July 17 On October 24, he hit his first 20 homers in a season against the Tohoku Rakuten Golden Eagles. In his second year as a regular, he played in 143 full games, ranked third in the league in runs batted in with 247, fifth in runs batted in with 77, batted .275 with 21 home runs, and played both right fielder, left fielder and third base on defense.

In 2022 season, Kurihara changed the Uniform number from 31 to 24. Kurihara had batted .353 with two home runs and five runs batted in in the first five games of the season, but on March 30, while playing left field against the Chiba Lotte Marines, he injured his left knee in a collision with center fielder Seiji Uebayashi. He was diagnosed with a suspected left anterior cruciate ligament tear and left lateral meniscus injury, which will take six to seven months to heal and will prevent him from returning for the season. On October 30, he joined the team's fall training camp, although he was not ready for the season.

In 2023 season, Kurihara was the starting third baseman in the opening game against the Chiba Lotte Marines on March 31, and hit home runs in two consecutive games. However, during his at-bat against the Chiba Lotte Marines on July 29, the inflammation in his left knee that he injured last season recurred, and he required rehabilitation. Kurihara returned to action against the Chiba Lotte Marines on August 23, but fractured the hamate bone in his right hand in that game, ending his season. He finished the regular season with a .239 batting average, a 13 home runs, and a 49 RBIs batted in in 96 games.

== International career ==
On June 16, 2021, Kurihara was selected as the Japan national baseball team in the Baseball at the 2020 Summer Olympics.
