= Nobutaka Imamura =

Japanese baseball player (born 1994)

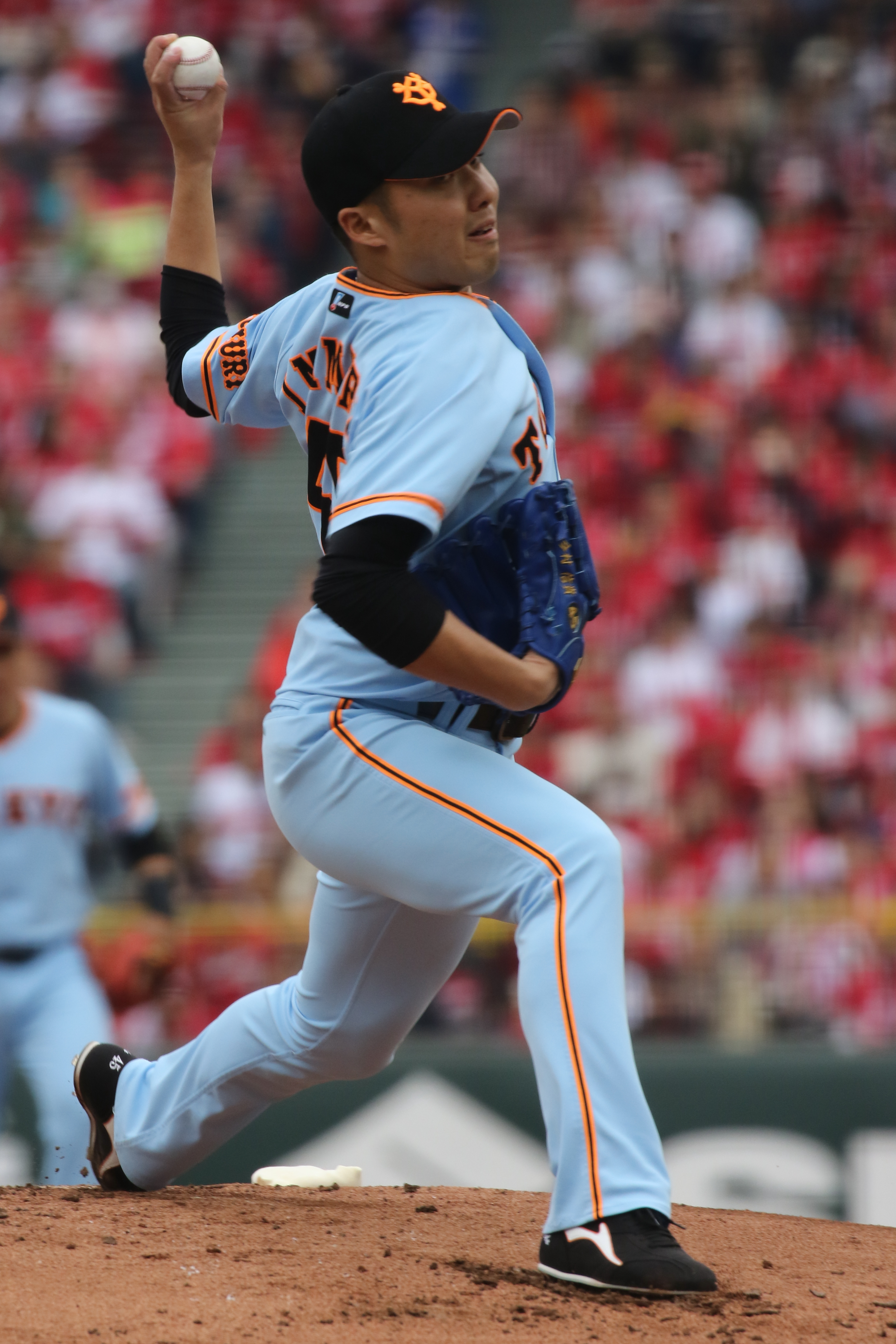
- Imamura with the Yomiuri Giants
- Pitcher
- Born: March 15, 1994 (age 32); Shijōnawate, Osaka, Japan
- Batted: Left Threw: Left

debut
- September 16, 2013, for the Yomiuri Giants

Last appearance
- August 23, 2024, for the Yomiuri Giants

Career statistics
- Win–loss record: 25-22
- Earned run average: 4.00
- Strikeouts: 372
- Saves: 0
- Holds: 24
- Stats at Baseball Reference

Teams
- Yomiuri Giants (2012–2025)

Nobutaka Imamura (今村 信貴, Imamura Nobutaka; born March 2, 1994 in Shijōnawate, Osaka, Japan) is a professional Japanese baseball player. He plays pitcher for the Yomiuri Giants.
