= Yuki Matsumoto (baseball) =

Japanese baseball player (born 1996)

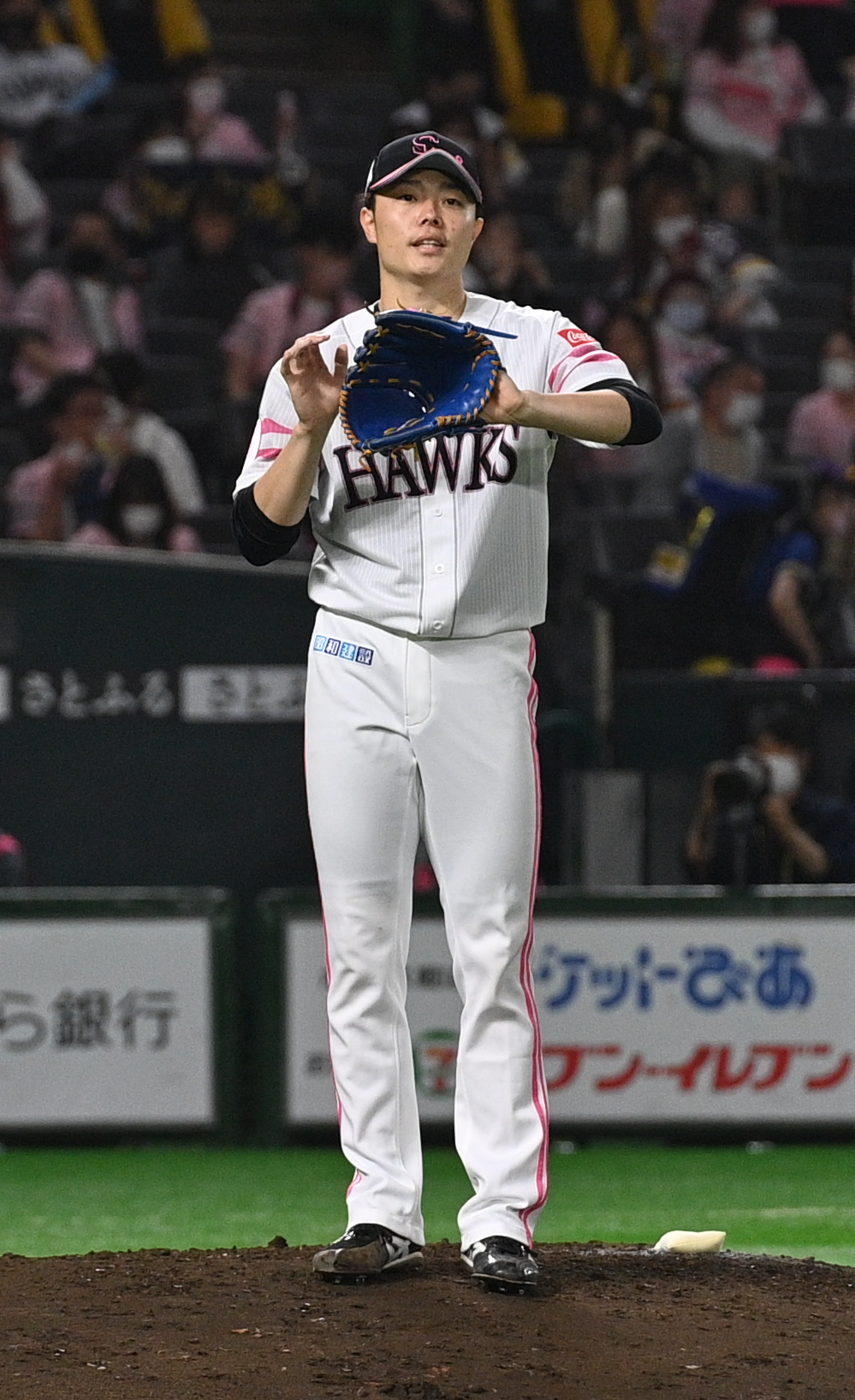
- Matsumoto with the Fukuoka SoftBank Hawks

Fukuoka SoftBank Hawks – No. 66
- Pitcher
- Born: April 14, 1996 (age 30); Yokohama, Kanagawa, Japan
- Bats: Left Throws: Right

NPB debut
- September 30, 2016, for the Fukuoka SoftBank Hawks

NPB statistics (through 2025 season)
- Win–loss record: 22–18
- Earned run average: 3.22
- Strikeouts: 405
- Stats at Baseball Reference

Teams
- Fukuoka SoftBank Hawks (2015–present)

Career highlights and awards
- 2x Japan Series champion (2020, 2025); NPB All-Star (2024)

Yuki Matsumoto (松本 裕樹, Matsumoto Yūki; born April 14, 1996 in Yokohama, Kanagawa Prefecture) is a Japanese professional baseball pitcher for the Fukuoka SoftBank Hawks of Nippon Professional Baseball (NPB).

== Early baseball career ==
Matsumoto participated in the 2nd grade spring 85th Japanese High School Baseball Invitational Tournament and the 3rd grade summer 96th Japanese High School Baseball Championship as a pitcher at the University of Morioka Affiliated High School.

== Professional career ==
On October 23, 2014, Matsumoto was drafted by the Fukuoka SoftBank Hawks first overall pick in the 2014 Nippon Professional Baseball draft.

He spent the 2015 season on right elbow rehabilitation.

On September 30, 2016, he pitched his debut game against the Tohoku Rakuten Golden Eagles.

From 2016 season to 2019 season, he recorded with a 29 Games pitched, a 4–7 Win–loss record, a 4.29 ERA, a 96 strikeouts in 121 2/3 innings.

Matsumoto recorded the Hold for the first time in the match against the Hokkaido Nippon-Ham Fighters on August 29. In 2020 season, he recorded with a 25 Games pitched, a 0–1 Win–loss record, a 3.49 ERA, a 6 Holds, a 27 strikeouts in 28.1 innings. In the 2020 Japan Series against the Yomiuri Giants, Matsumoto pitched after starter Tsuyoshi Wada in Game 4, became the first Winning pitcher in the Japan Series, and contributed to the team's fourth consecutive Japan Series champion. On December 16, Matsumoto underwent surgery for a Spinal disc herniation.

In 2021 season, he pitched in a career-high 33 games, going 3–3 with a 3.79 ERA, four holds, and 59 strikeouts in 73.2 innings.

In 2022 season, Matsumoto was undergoing acupuncture treatment on March 23 when the treatment needle broke and the procedure caused him to miss the opening game. However, he won as a relief pitcher on May 25, and from then on he contributed to the team as a setup man who pitched in the 7th inning. In 44 appearances, he went 5–1 with a 2.66 ERA, 15 holds, and 60 strikeouts in 50.2 innings pitched.

In 2023 season, Matsumoto was used as a setup man midway through the season when Liván Moinelo left the team to undergo surgery on his left elbow. He continued to contribute to the team as a setup man and finished the regular season with a career-high 53 games pitched, a 2–2 Win–loss record, a 2.68 ERA, a 25 holds, and a 60 strikeouts in 47 innings.
