= Seishu Hatake =

Japanese baseball player (born 1994)

Seishū Hatake
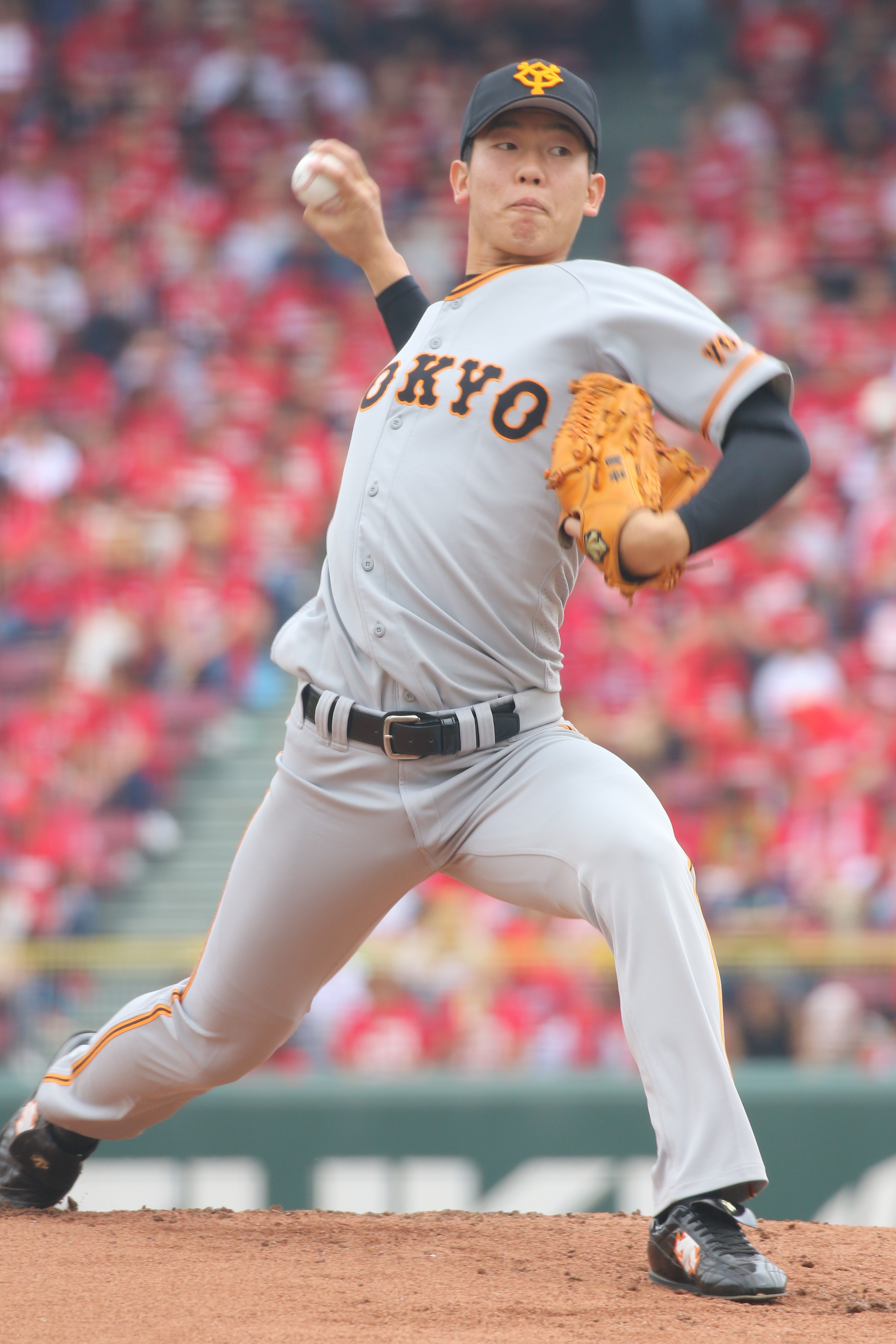
- Hatake with the Yomiuri Giants

Hanshin Tigers – No. 36
- Pitcher
- Born: May 31, 1994 (age 31); Kure, Hiroshima, Japan
- Bats: Left Throws: Right

NPB debut
- July 6, 2017, for the Yomiuri Giants

Career statistics (through 2025 season)
- Win–loss record: 19-12
- Earned Run Average: 3.08
- Strikeouts: 270
- Saves: 2
- Holds: 23
- Stats at Baseball Reference

Teams
- Yomiuri Giants (2017–2024); Hanshin Tigers (2025-present)

Seishū Hatake (畠 世周, Hatake Seishū; born May 31, 1994 in Kure, Hiroshima, Japan) is a professional Japanese baseball player. He plays pitcher for the Hanshin Tigers.
