= Seiya Inoue (baseball) =

Japanese baseball player (born 1989)

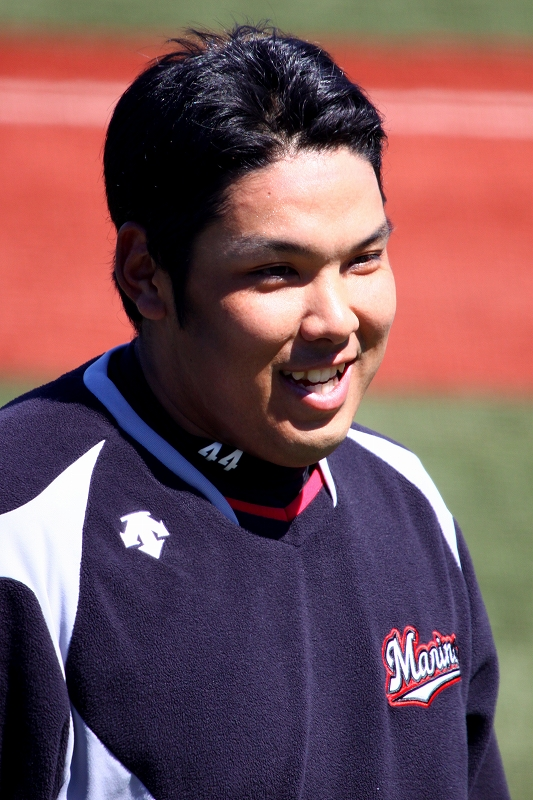
- Inoue with the Chiba Lotte Marines
- Infielder
- Born: July 3, 1989 (age 36); Hiroshima, Hiroshima, Japan
- Batted: Right Threw: Right

NPB debut
- March 28, 2014, for the Chiba Lotte Marines

Last NPB appearance
- September 25, 2023, for the Chiba Lotte Marines

NPB statistics
- Batting average: .250
- Home runs: 76
- RBI: 313
- Stats at Baseball Reference

Teams
- Chiba Lotte Marines (2014–2024)

Seiya Inoue (井上 晴哉, Inoue Seiya; born July 3, 1989), nicknamed "Aja", is a Japanese former professional baseball infielder. He played in Nippon Professional Baseball (NPB) from 2014 to 2024 for the Chiba Lotte Marines.

== Career ==
Inoue played parts of 10 seasons in Nippon Professional Baseball from 2014 to 2014 for the Chiba Lotte Marines. Playing in 601 total games, he batted .250/.340/.417 with 76 home runs and 313 RBI. On October 22, 2024, Inoue announced his retirement from professional baseball.
