= Shuta Ishikawa =

Japanese baseball player (born 1991)

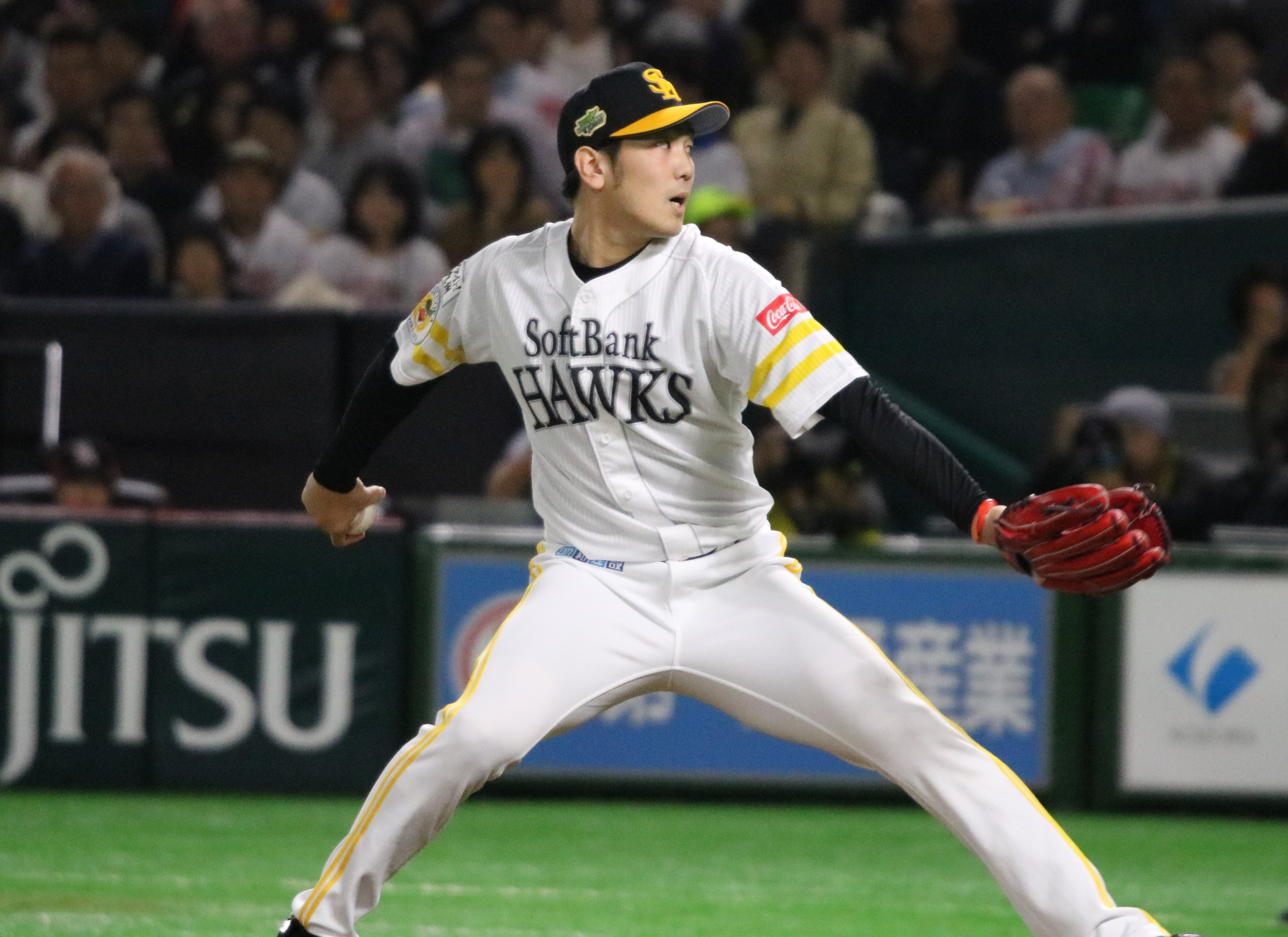

Chiba Lotte Marines – No. 21
- pitcher
- Born: December 27, 1991 (age 34); Shinagawa, Tokyo, Japan
- Bats: Right Throws: Right

NPB debut
- April 4, 2017, for the Fukuoka SoftBank Hawks

NPB statistics (through 2024 season)
- Win–loss record: 56–41
- ERA: 3.32
- Strikeouts: 712
- Stats at Baseball Reference

Teams
- Fukuoka SoftBank Hawks (2014–2024); Chiba Lotte Marines (2025–present)

Career highlights and awards
- 1× Pacific League winning percentage leader (2020); 1× Pacific League the most wins Champion (2020); 1× Pacific League Speed Up Award (2020); 4× Japan Series Champion (2017–2020); Pitched a no-hitter on August 18, 2023

Shuta Ishikawa (石川 柊太, Ishikawa Shūta; born December 27, 1991) is a Japanese professional baseball pitcher for the Chiba Lotte Marines of Nippon Professional Baseball (NPB).

He pitched a no-hitter in the Pacific League on August 18, 2023.

== Professional career ==
On October 24, 2013, Ishikawa was drafted as a developmental player by the Fukuoka Softbank Hawks in the 2013 Nippon Professional Baseball draft.

=== 2014–2020 season ===
From 2014 to 2016, he played in informal matches against the Shikoku Island League Plus's teams and amateur baseball teams, and played in the Western League of NPB second leagues.

On July 1, 2016, he signed a 5 million yen contract with the Fukuoka SoftBank Hawks as a registered player under control

On April 4, 2017, Ishikawa pitched his debut game against the Tohoku Rakuten Golden Eagles as a relief pitcher. On May 31, he won the game as a starting pitcher for the first time. In 2017 season, he finished the regular season with a 34 Games pitched, a 8–3 Win–loss record, a 3.29 ERA, a one Holds, a 99 strikeouts in 98 1/3 innings. In post season, he pitched against the Yokohama DeNA BayStars as a relief pitcher in the 2017 Japan Series, and won the game for the first time in the Japan Series on October 31.

In the 2018 season, Ishikawa finished the regular season with 42 games pitched, a 13–6 win–loss record, a 3.60 ERA, 6 holds, and 96 strikeouts in 127 1/3 innings. On October 10, he was selected for the Japan national baseball team to play at the 2018 MLB Japan All-Star Series, but on November 2, he canceled his participation. And he pitched against the Hiroshima Toyo Carp as a relief pitcher in the 2018 Japan Series, but he felt uncomfortable on his right elbow and left the bench on October 31.

Ishikawa developed right elbow pain in April and spent most of the 2019 season in rehabilitation. He made a comeback on September 23, but only pitched two games in the 2019 season. However, he pitched as a relief pitcher and won in the 2019 Japan Series against the Yomiuri Giants, contributing to the team's third consecutive victory.

In the match against the Saitama Seibu Lions on August 1, 2020, Ishikawa recorded his first shutout game. In 2020 season, he finished the regular season with a 18 Games pitched, a 11–3 Win–loss record (Pacific League the most wins Champion, Winning percentage leader .786), a 2.42 ERA, a 103 strikeouts in 111.2 innings. In the 2020 Japan Series against the Yomiuri Giants, He pitched in Game 2 as a starting pitcher, becoming the first starting pitcher in his career to win the Japan Series and contributing to the team's fourth consecutive Japan Series champion. On December 17, Ishikawa was honored for the Pacific League most wins Champion Award, the Pacific League winning percentage leader Award, and the Pacific League Speed Up Award at the NPB AWARD 2020.

=== 2021 season–present ===
On March 26, 2021, Ishikawa pitched against Chiba Lotte Marines in the opening game of the season and collected a win for the first time as a pitcher from the developmental squad. In 2021 season, he recorded a 6–9 win–loss record, a 3.40 ERA, and 134 strikeouts in 156 1/3 innings.

In the 2022 season, he suffered from an ankle injury. Despite the ailment, he finished the regular season with 23 appearances, a 7–10 Win–loss record, a 3.37 ERA, and 106 strikeouts in 136 1/3 innings.

On August 18, 2023, Ishikawa threw a no-hitter against the Saitama Seibu Lions at Fukuoka PayPay Dome. In 2023 season, he finished the regular season with a 23 Games pitched, a 4-8 Win–loss record, a 4.15 ERA, and a 119 strikeouts in 125.2 innings.

== International career ==
Ishikawa represented the Japan national baseball team in the Samurai Japan Series 2022.

== Personal life ==
On January 28, 2023, Ishikawa married former SKE48 member Mina Oba.
