= 2016 Central League Climax Series =

First stage
Team (Wins)		Manager	Season
Yokohama DeNA BayStars (2)		Alex Ramírez	69–71–3 (.493), 19.5 GB
Yomiuri Giants (1)		Yoshinobu Takahashi	71–69–3 (.507), 17.5 GB
- Dates: October 8–10

Final stage
Team (Wins)		Manager	Season
Hiroshima Toyo Carp (4)		Koichi Ogata	89–52–2 (.631), 17.5 GA
Yokohama DeNA BayStars (1)		Alex Ramírez	69–71–3 (.493), 19.5 GB
- Dates: October 12–16
- MVP: Kosuke Tanaka (Hiroshima)

The 2016 Central League Climax Series (CLCS) was a post-season playoff consisting of two consecutive series that determined who would represent the Central League in the Japan Series. The First Stage was a best-of-three series and the Final Stage was a best-of-six with the top seed being awarded a one-win advantage. The winner of the series advanced to the 2016 Japan Series, where they competed against the 2016 Pacific League Climax Series winner. The top three regular-season finishers played in the two series. The CLCS began with the first game of the First Stage on October 8 and ended with the final game of the Final Stage on October 16.

== First stage ==
=== Summary ===
Yokohama DeNA BayStars won the series, 2–1.

Game	Date	Score	Location	Time	Attendance
1	October 8	Yokohama DeNA BayStars – 5, Yomiuri Giants – 3	Tokyo Dome	3:19	45,633
2	October 9	Yokohama DeNA BayStars – 1, Yomiuri Giants – 2	Tokyo Dome	2:47	45,683
3	October 10	Yokohama DeNA BayStars – 4, Yomiuri Giants – 3 (11)	Tokyo Dome	4:21	45,477

=== Game 1 ===
Saturday, October 8, 2016, 2:00 pm (JST) at Tokyo Dome in Bunkyō, Tokyo
Team	1	2	3	4	5	6	7	8	9	R	H	E
DeNA	0	0	1	0	0	2	0	0	2	5	8	0
Yomiuri	1	0	0	0	1	0	0	0	1	3	9	0
WP: Shoichi Ino (1–0) LP: Miles Mikolas (0–1) Sv: Yasuaki Yamasaki (1); Home runs: DEN: Takayuki Kajitani (1), Yoshitomo Tsutsugo (1), José López(1); YOM: Hayato Sakamoto (1); Attendance: 45,633

=== Game 2 ===
Sunday, October 9, 2016, 2:00 pm (JST) at Tokyo Dome in Bunkyō, Tokyo
Team	1	2	3	4	5	6	7	8	9	R	H	E
DeNA	0	1	0	0	0	0	0	0	0	1	5	0
Yomiuri	0	0	1	0	0	0	0	1	X	2	4	0
WP: Scott Mathieson (1–0) LP: Tomoya Mikami (0–1); Home runs: DEN: None; YOM: Hayato Sakamoto (2); Attendance: 45,683

=== Game 3 ===
Monday, October 10, 2016, 2:01 pm (JST) at Tokyo Dome in Bunkyō, Tokyo
Team	1	2	3	4	5	6	7	8	9	10	11	R	H	E
DeNA	2	1	0	0	0	0	0	0	0	0	1	4	10	0
Yomiuri	2	0	0	0	0	1	0	0	0	0	0	3	6	0
WP: Kenjiro Tanaka (1–0) LP: Hirokazu Sawamura (0–1) Sv: Yasuaki Yamasaki (2); Home runs: DEN: José López (2); YOM: Shinnosuke Abe (1), Shuichi Murata (1); Attendance: 45,477

== Final stage ==
=== Summary ===
Hiroshima Toyo Carp won the series, 4–1*.

Game	Date	Score	Location	Time	Attendance
1	October 12	Yokohama DeNA BayStars – 0, Hiroshima Toyo Carp – 5	Mazda Stadium	2:48	31,276
2	October 13	Yokohama DeNA BayStars – 0, Hiroshima Toyo Carp – 3	Mazda Stadium	2:58	31,264
3	October 14	Yokohama DeNA BayStars – 3, Hiroshima Toyo Carp – 0	Mazda Stadium	3:19	31,291
4	October 15	Yokohama DeNA BayStars – 7, Hiroshima Toyo Carp – 8	Mazda Stadium	3:26	31,313

* The Central League regular season champion is given a one-game advantage in the Final Stage.

=== Game 1 ===
Wednesday, October 12, 2016, 6:02 pm (JST) at Mazda Zoom-Zoom Stadium Hiroshima in Hiroshima, Hiroshima Prefecture
Team	1	2	3	4	5	6	7	8	9	R	H	E
DeNA	0	0	0	0	0	0	0	0	0	0	3	1
Hiroshima	0	0	2	0	0	0	2	1	X	5	9	0
WP: Kris Johnson (1–0) LP: Guillermo Moscoso (0–1); Attendance: 31,276

=== Game 2 ===
Thursday, October 13, 2016, 6:00 pm (JST) at Mazda Zoom-Zoom Stadium Hiroshima in Hiroshima, Hiroshima Prefecture
Team	1	2	3	4	5	6	7	8	9	R	H	E
DeNA	0	0	0	0	0	0	0	0	0	0	5	0
Hiroshima	1	0	1	0	0	0	0	1	X	3	4	1
WP: Yusuke Nomura (1–0) LP: Kazuki Mishima (0–1) Sv: Shota Nakazaki (1); Home runs: DEN: None; HIR: Kosuke Tanaka (1); Attendance: 31,264

=== Game 3 ===
Friday, October 14, 2016, 6:00 pm (JST) at Mazda Zoom-Zoom Stadium Hiroshima in Hiroshima, Hiroshima Prefecture
Team	1	2	3	4	5	6	7	8	9	R	H	E
DeNA	0	0	0	2	1	0	0	0	0	3	9	0
Hiroshima	0	0	0	0	0	0	0	0	0	0	5	1
WP: Shoichi Ino (1–0) LP: Hiroki Kuroda (0–1) Sv: Yasuaki Yamasaki (1); Home runs: DEN: Elián Herrera (1); HIR: None; Attendance: 31,291

=== Game 4 ===
Saturday, October 15, 2016, 1:31 pm (JST) at Mazda Zoom-Zoom Stadium Hiroshima in Hiroshima, Hiroshima Prefecture
Team	1	2	3	4	5	6	7	8	9	R	H	E
DeNA	0	2	2	0	0	2	1	0	0	7	10	0
Hiroshima	6	0	1	0	1	0	0	0	X	8	11	2
WP: Akitake Okada (1–0) LP: Shota Imanaga (0–1) Sv: Shota Nakazaki (2); Home runs: DEN: Takayuki Kajitani (1), José López (1); HIR: Brad Eldred (1); Attendance: 31,313
