= 2018 Japan Series =

69th edition of Nippon Professional Baseball's championship series

Team (Wins)	Managers	Season
Fukuoka SoftBank Hawks (4)	Kimiyasu Kudo	82–60–1 (.577), 6.5 GB
Hiroshima Toyo Carp (1)	Koichi Ogata	82–59–2 (.582), 7 GA
- Dates: October 27 – November 3
- MVP: Takuya Kai (Fukuoka)
- FSA: Seiya Suzuki (Hiroshima)

Broadcast
- Television: TV Asahi (Games 1, 5); Fuji TV (Game 2); TBS (Games 3, 6); NTV (Games 4); NHK BS-1 (Games 3–5)
- Radio: RCC, RKB Mainichi, Kyushu Asahi, JOLF, NHK Radio 1

The 2018 Japan Series (known as the SMBC Nippon Series 2018 for sponsorship reasons) was the championship series of Nippon Professional Baseball's (NPB) 2018 season. The 69th edition of the Japan Series, it was a best-of-seven playoff between the Fukuoka SoftBank Hawks, the Pacific League's (PL) Climax Series champion and defending Japan Series champions, and the Hiroshima Toyo Carp, the Central League's (CL) Climax Series champion. The Hawks defeated the Carp, 4–1–1, in six games, to win their second consecutive Japan Series championship and their fifth in eight years.

The Hawks finished the 2018 regular season in second place in the Pacific League. They advanced to the Japan Series after defeating the Hokkaido Nippon-Ham Fighters and the Saitama Seibu Lions in the Climax Series. The Carp finished in first place in the Central League for the third consecutive year, earning a bye in the first stage of the Climax Series. They defeated the Yomiuri Giants in Climax Series to reach the Japan Series.

At Mazda Stadium in Hiroshima, the Hawks and Carp tied in Game 1, and the Carp won Game 2. The Hawks then won the next four games, including Games 3 through 5 at Fukuoka Yahuoku! Dome in Fukuoka, to win the series. Takuya Kai won the Japan Series Most Valuable Player Award.

== Climax Series ==
The Fukuoka SoftBank Hawks finished the 2018 regular season in second place behind the Saitama Seibu Lions, securing them a place as host team for the First Stage of the Climax Series, a best-of-three series against the Hokkaido Nippon-Ham Fighters. After defeating the Fighters 2–1, SoftBank advanced to the Final Stage where they competed against the PL pennant winning Lions. The series is best-of-six and the Lions were awarded a one-win advantage as well as home field advantage for the entire series. The Hawks defeated the Lions 4–2 to advance to the Japan Series. Since the Climax Series' creation in 2007, it was only the second time a Pacific League team that didn't win the pennant advanced to the Japan Series and only the fourth time between both leagues. For the third year in a row, the Hiroshima Toyo Carp won the Central League, giving them a First Stage bye and advancing them directly to the Final Stage. They swept the third place Yomiuri Giants in three games securing them a place in the Japan Series.

First Stage
Central League
2	Tokyo Yakult Swallows	0
3	Yomiuri Giants	2
Pacific League
2	Fukuoka SoftBank Hawks	2
3	Hokkaido Nippon-Ham Fighters	1

Final Stage
1	Hiroshima Toyo Carp	4
3	Yomiuri Giants	0
1	Saitama Seibu Lions	2
2	Fukuoka SoftBank Hawks	4

Japan Series
CL1	Hiroshima Toyo Carp	1
PL2	Fukuoka SoftBank Hawks	4

== Series notes ==
The Fukuoka SoftBank Hawks won the 2017 Japan Series and defeated the Saitama Seibu Lions in the 2018 Pacific League Climax Series to return to the Japan Series in 2018. The Hiroshima Toyo Carp won their third consecutive Central League pennant. They lost in the 2016 Japan Series to the Hokkaido Nippon-Ham Fighters and lost in the 2017 Central League Climax Series.

During the annual managers' meeting where Japan Series rules are discussed and set, managers Koichi Ogata and Kimiyasu Kudo agreed to announce who their starting pitcher would be the day before each game. Starters are announced early during the regular season, however both teams need to agree to the practice in the Japan Series. Additionally, it was decided that games in the series would only last through 12 innings and if a game was still even after that, it would result in a tie game. Previously, Japan Series games would last through 15 innings before resulting in a tie, however this change brought the series in line with the format used during both the regular season and the Climax Series. For the fifth year in a row, Sumitomo Mitsui Banking Corporation (SMBC) is sponsoring the event and it is officially known as the "2018 SMBC Japan Series".

== Series overview ==
Fukuoka SoftBank Hawks won the series, 4–1–1.

Game	Date	Score	Location	Time	Attendance
1	October 27	Fukuoka SoftBank Hawks – 2, Hiroshima Toyo Carp – 2 (12)	Mazda Stadium	4:38	30,727
2	October 28	Fukuoka SoftBank Hawks – 1, Hiroshima Toyo Carp – 5	Mazda Stadium	2:55	30,724
3	October 30	Hiroshima Toyo Carp – 8, Fukuoka SoftBank Hawks – 9	Fukuoka Yahuoku! Dome	3:57	35,746
4	October 31	Hiroshima Toyo Carp – 1, Fukuoka SoftBank Hawks – 4	Fukuoka Yahuoku! Dome	3:21	35,796
5	November 1	Hiroshima Toyo Carp – 4, Fukuoka SoftBank Hawks – 5 (10)	Fukuoka Yahuoku! Dome	4:25	35,917
6	November 3	Fukuoka SoftBank Hawks – 2, Hiroshima Toyo Carp – 0	Mazda Stadium	3:14	30,723

== Game summaries ==
=== Game 1 ===
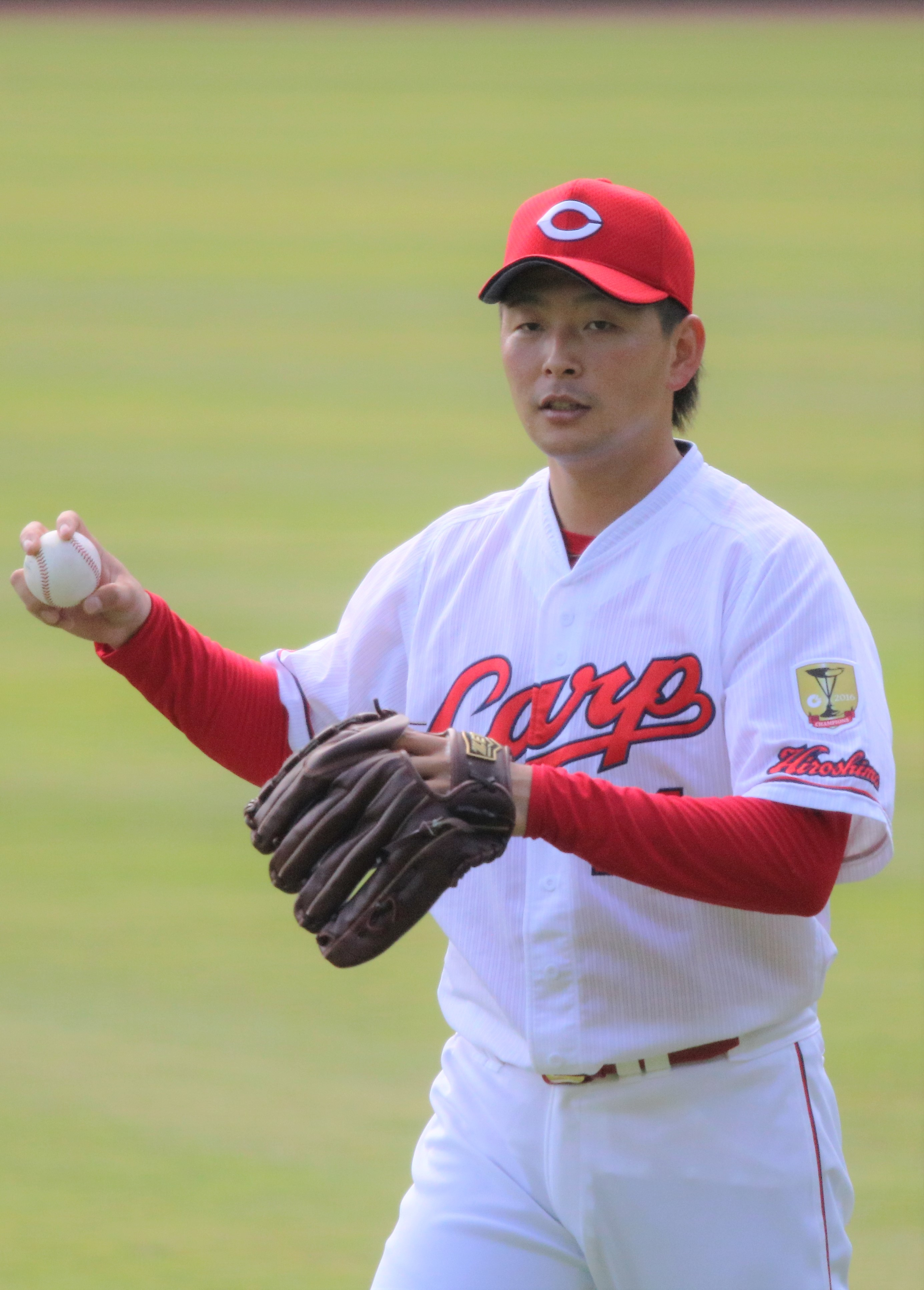
Daichi Osera didn't allow a hit through the first four innings of Game 1.

Saturday, October 27, 2018, 6:33 pm (JST) at Mazda Zoom-Zoom Stadium Hiroshima in Hiroshima, Hiroshima Prefecture
Team	1	2	3	4	5	6	7	8	9	10	11	12	R	H	E
SoftBank	0	0	0	0	2	0	0	0	0	0	0	0	2	6	1
Hiroshima	2	0	0	0	0	0	0	0	0	0	0	0	2	8	1
Home runs: SBH: None; HIR: Ryosuke Kikuchi (1); Attendance: 30,727; Boxscore

Daichi Osera started Game 1 for the Carp and Kodai Senga started for the Hawks. Hiroshima scored two runs in the first inning on a home run by Ryosuke Kikuchi and a run batted in (RBI) single by Ryuhei Matsuyama. Osera then went on to strike out six of the first thirteen batters he faced and did not give up a hit until the fifth inning. SoftBank capitalized and scored two in the inning when pinch hitter Alfredo Despaigne drove in a run by singling to second baseman Kikuchi. Kikuchi's throw to first base was off target and resulted in a throwing error that allowed a second runner to score. Both teams had scoring chances during the remainder of the game, including a bases-loaded opportunity in the eleventh inning for the Hawks, but each team's relief pitchers kept the game tied through the twelfth. With the postseason now using the same innings limit as the regular season (after 12 innings instead of 15 in the past), the game ended in a 2–2 tie after twelve innings. This Japan Series tie game was the first since the 2010 Japan Series and the first to open a Japan Series since 1986.

=== Game 2 ===
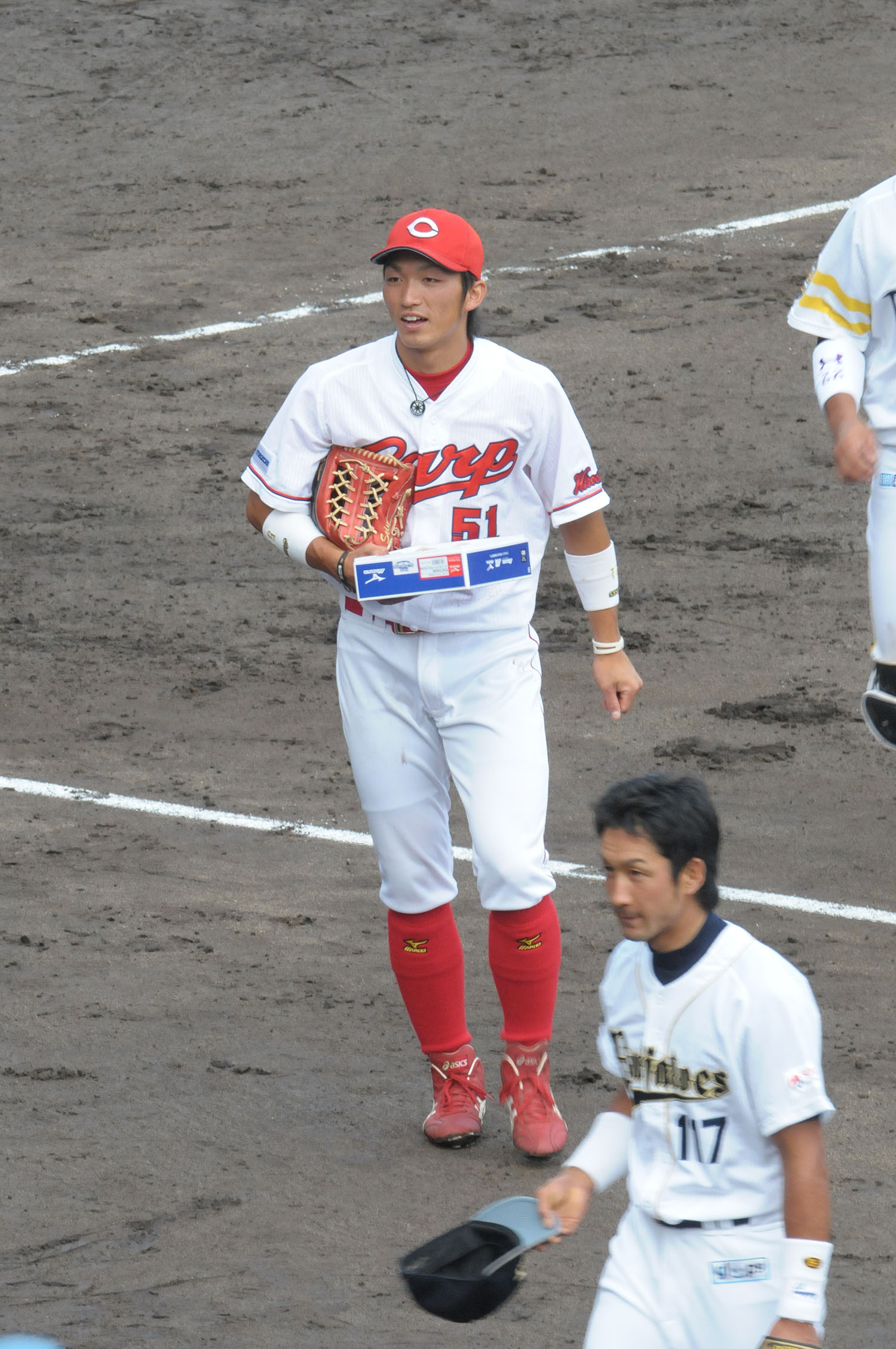
Seiya Suzuki had three hits and three runs batted in in Game 2.

Sunday, October 28, 2018, 6:34 pm (JST) at Mazda Zoom-Zoom Stadium Hiroshima in Hiroshima, Hiroshima Prefecture
Team	1	2	3	4	5	6	7	8	9	R	H	E
SoftBank	0	0	0	0	0	0	1	0	0	1	4	1
Hiroshima	1	0	2	0	2	0	0	0	X	5	10	1
WP: Kris Johnson (1–0) LP: Rick van den Hurk (0–1); Attendance: 30,724; Boxscore

In Game 2, the Hawks started Rick van den Hurk. For the second straight game, the Carp scored in the first inning. With no designated hitter, Despaigne was playing left field for only the fifth time all season when leadoff hitter Kosuke Tanaka hit a ball his way. Tanaka was able to stretch a single into a double due to questionable fielding by Despaigne. Tanaka went on to score after a sacrifice bunt moved him to third base and Seiya Suzuki' single drove him home. Hiroshima added to their run total when they scored two unearned runs in the third inning. After a throwing error by Keizo Kawashima allowed runners to safely reach second and third base, Yoshihiro Maru drove one in on a sacrifice fly while the second run scored on an RBI single by Ryuhei Matsuyama. In the fifth inning, the Carp scored twice from a two-run single by Suzuki. Hiroshima starter Kris Johnson allowed only one run on four singles and a walk through seven innings. He struck out seven batters. SoftBank's only run of the night came from a Nobuhiro Matsuda RBI single in the seventh inning.

=== Game 3 ===
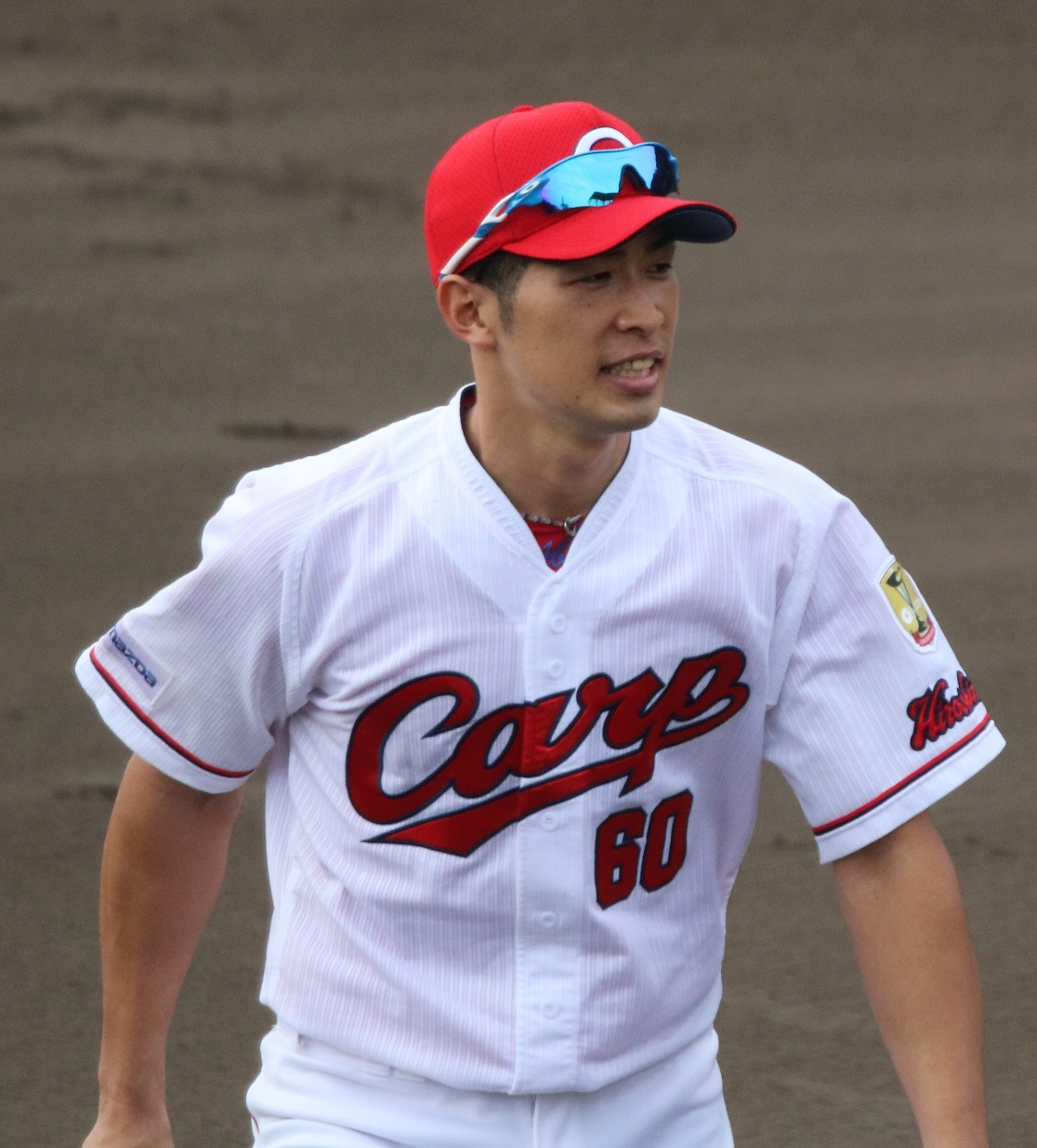
Tomohiro Abe hit two home runs, including a grand slam, in a Game 3 loss.

Tuesday, October 30, 2018, 6:33 pm (JST) at Fukuoka Yahuoku! Dome in Fukuoka, Fukuoka Prefecture
Team	1	2	3	4	5	6	7	8	9	R	H	E
Hiroshima	0	0	0	0	1	2	0	5	0	8	16	1
SoftBank	0	0	0	2	2	4	1	0	X	9	12	0
WP: Ariel Miranda (1–0) LP: Aren Kuri (0–1) Sv: Yuito Mori (1); Home runs: HIR: Tomohiro Abe 2 (2), Seiya Suzuki 2 (2); SBH: Alfredo Despaigne (1), Hiroaki Takaya (1); Attendance: 35,746; Boxscore

With the series moving to Fukuoka for Game 3, the Hawks started Ariel Miranda while the Carp started Aren Kuri. The Hawks scored first; in the fourth inning, Kuri issued two walks and then allowed Akira Nakamura and Kenta Imamiya to each single in a run, giving the Hawks their first lead of the series. After pitching four scoreless innings, Miranda gave up a solo home run to Tomohiro Abe, cutting the lead in half. In the bottom half of the same inning, however, the Hawks scored a run scored off of a throwing error by Alejandro Mejía and scored again after Kuri was taken out of the game. The Carp scored two runs in the next inning, one from a solo home run by Seiya Suzuki. After Akitake Okada retired the first two batters in the bottom half of the inning, three consecutive Hawks' singles gave them another run before Alfredo Despaigne opened up a five-run lead with a three-run home run. A solo home run by Hiroaki Takaya in the seventh inning gave the Hawks just enough runs to fend off a Carp comeback in the eighth inning. Suzuki led off the inning with his second solo home run of the game and then two singles and a walk set the stage for a grand slam by Abe, also his second home run of the game. Hawks reliever Yuito Mori worked a scoreless inning to preserve the win and earn a save. The win was the Hawks' tenth straight victory at home in the Japan Series, dating back to 2011. The Carp lost the game with 16 hits, the biggest number of hits made by the losing team in a single match, although it was also the biggest number of hits ever made in a single match by the Carp in the Japan Series history .

=== Game 4 ===
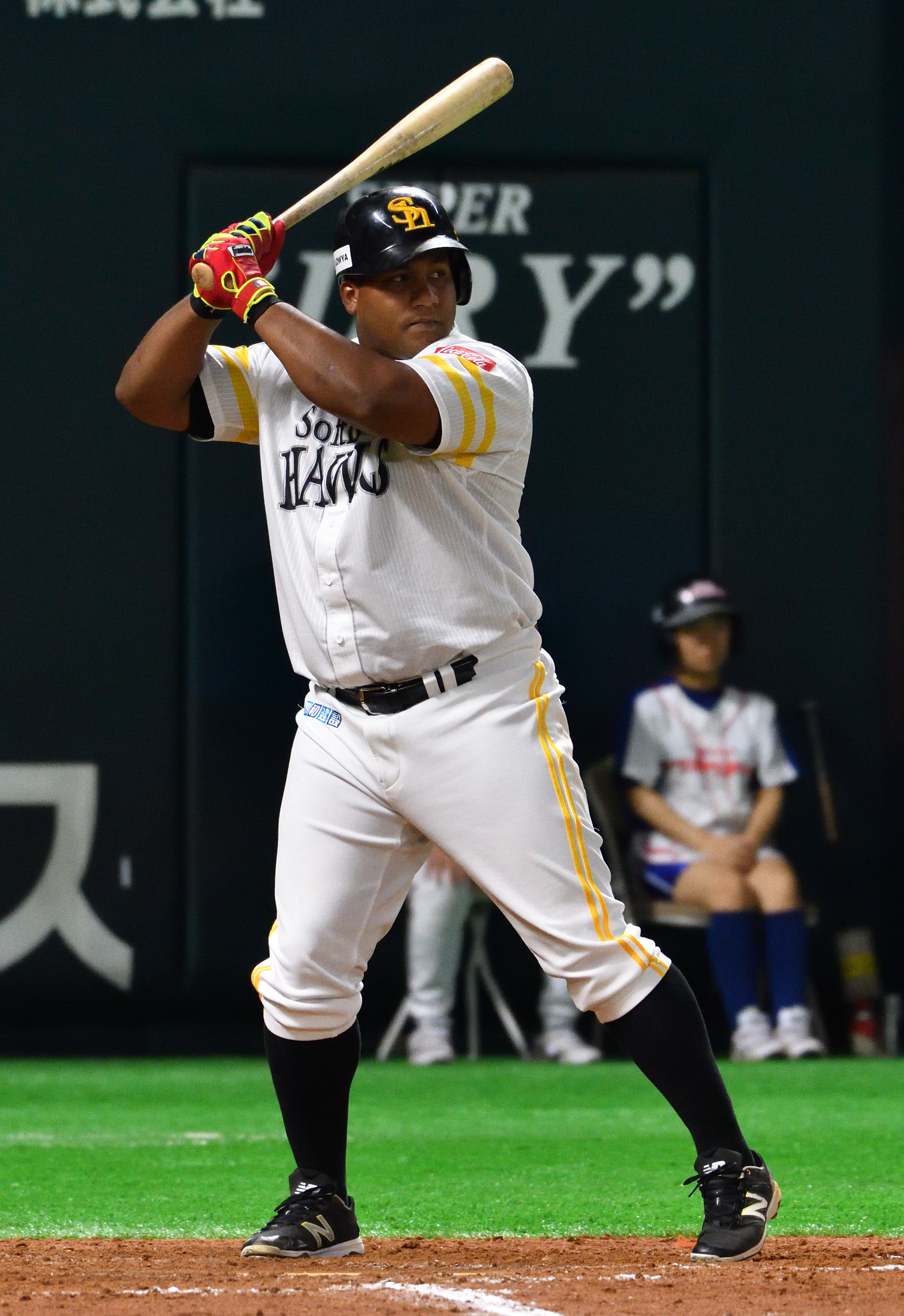
Alfredo Despaigne hit his second home run of the series in Game 4.

Wednesday, October 31, 2018, 6:34 pm (JST) at Fukuoka Yahuoku! Dome in Fukuoka, Fukuoka Prefecture
Team	1	2	3	4	5	6	7	8	9	R	H	E
Hiroshima	0	0	0	1	0	0	0	0	0	1	4	0
SoftBank	0	0	2	1	0	1	0	0	X	4	9	0
WP: Nao Higashihama (1–0) LP: Yusuke Nomura (0–1) Sv: Yuito Mori (2); Home runs: HIR: Seiya Suzuki (3); SBH: Seiji Uebayashi (1), Alfredo Despaigne (2); Attendance: 35,796; Boxscore

The starting pitchers for Game 4 were Nao Higashihama for the Hawks and Yusuke Nomura for the Carp. In the first inning, SoftBank prevented an early lead by Hiroshima when Ryosuke Kikuchi was thrown out at home plate. Kikuchi attempted to score from first base on a double by Yoshihiro Maru, but was thrown out on a relay throw from center field. Higashihama went on to pitch through five innings and allowed only one run on four hits. The sole run scored by the Carp came from a home run in the fourth inning by Suzuki, his third of the series. Nomura was charged with the loss for the Hawks. He lasted 4 1/3 innings and gave up a two-run home run to Seiji Uebayashi in the third and allowed Despaigne to hit his second home run of the series in the fourth. The Hawks closed out their scoring with pinch hitter Yuya Hasegawa driving in a run with a hit in the sixth inning. With the win, SoftBank extended their consecutive wins-at-home streak in the Japan Series to eleven, breaking the previous record of ten held by the 1970–73 Yomiuri Giants.

=== Game 5 ===
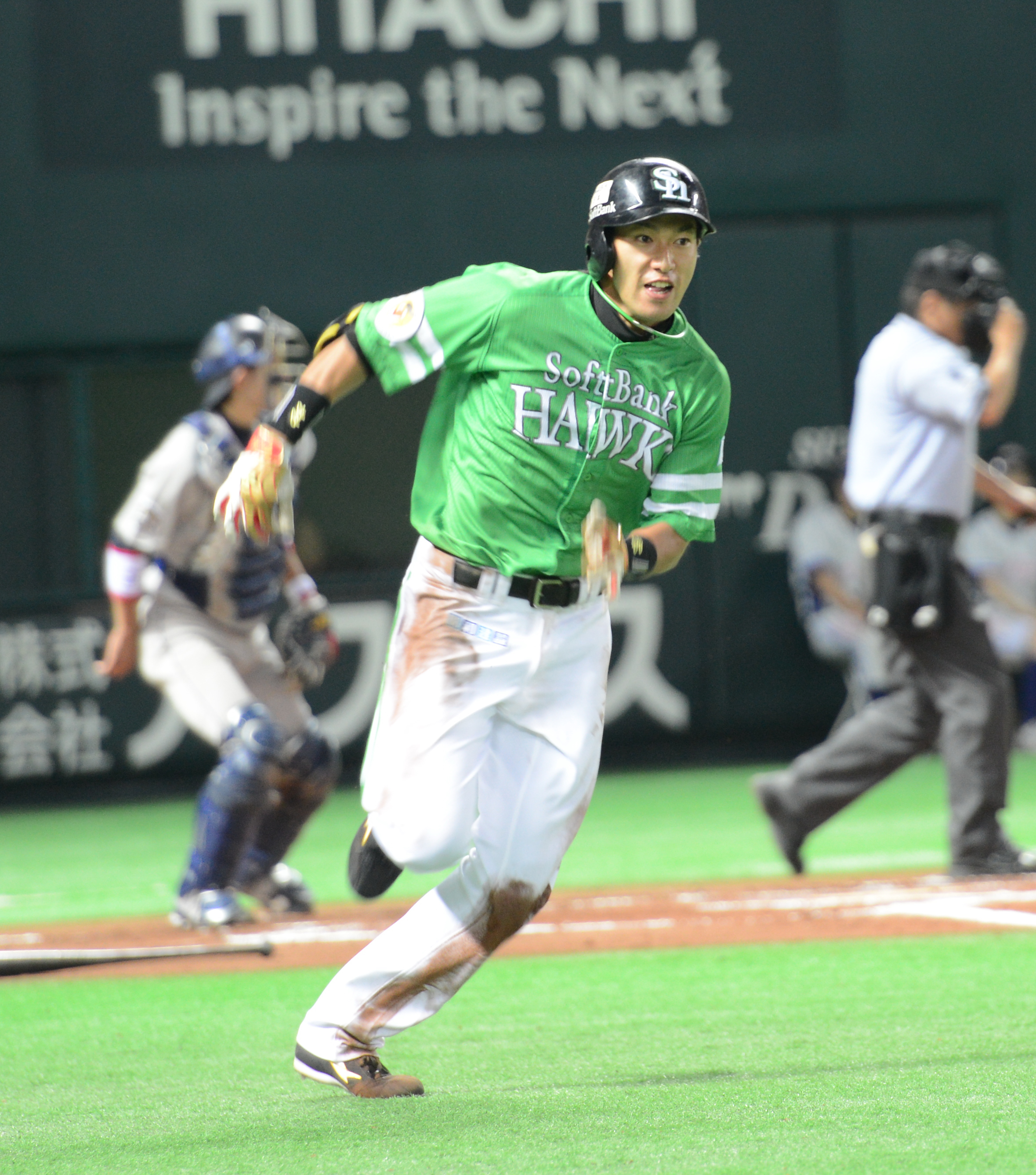
Yuki Yanagita hit a walk-off home run in extra innings to win Game 5.

Thursday, November 1, 2018, 6:33 pm (JST) at Fukuoka Yahuoku! Dome in Fukuoka, Fukuoka Prefecture
Team	1	2	3	4	5	6	7	8	9	10	R	H	E
Hiroshima	0	1	0	0	2	1	0	0	0	0	4	8	0
SoftBank	0	0	0	2	1	0	1	0	0	1	5	9	0
WP: Ren Kajiya (1–0) LP: Shota Nakazaki (0–1); Home runs: HIR: Yoshihiro Maru (1), Tsubasa Aizawa (1); SBH: Kenji Akashi (1), Yuki Yanagita (1); Attendance: 35,917; Boxscore

Osera and Senga started Game 5, in a rematch of the opening game of the series. For the first time since Game 2, Hiroshima scored first when Tsubasa Aizawa's single scored Ryuhei Matsuyama. SoftBank pulled ahead in the fourth inning on a two-run single by Nakamura and went on to load the bases that same inning, however Osera was able to pitch out of the inning with no further runs being scored. The next inning, Liván Moinelo relieved Senga and promptly gave up a two-run home run to Maru, once again giving the Carp the lead. The Hawks started the bottom half of the same inning with two singles, one of which was upheld on a replay review. After the runners being bunted over to second and third base, Johnny Hellweg was brought out of the bullpen to relieve Osera. The next batter, Yurisbel Gracial, was hit by pitch to load the bases setting the stage to allow a run to score on a groundout by Yanagita. Aizawa broke the tie and gave the Carp the lead in the sixth inning but the Hawks tied it up again in the seventh when Akashi hit a solo home run. In the bottom of the tenth inning, Yuki Yanagita won the game with a walk-off home run off of Carp closing pitcher Shota Nakazaki. The win extended the Hawks' record-setting home winning streak to twelve, and the Pacific League's home winning streak in the Japan Series to fifteen.

=== Game 6 ===
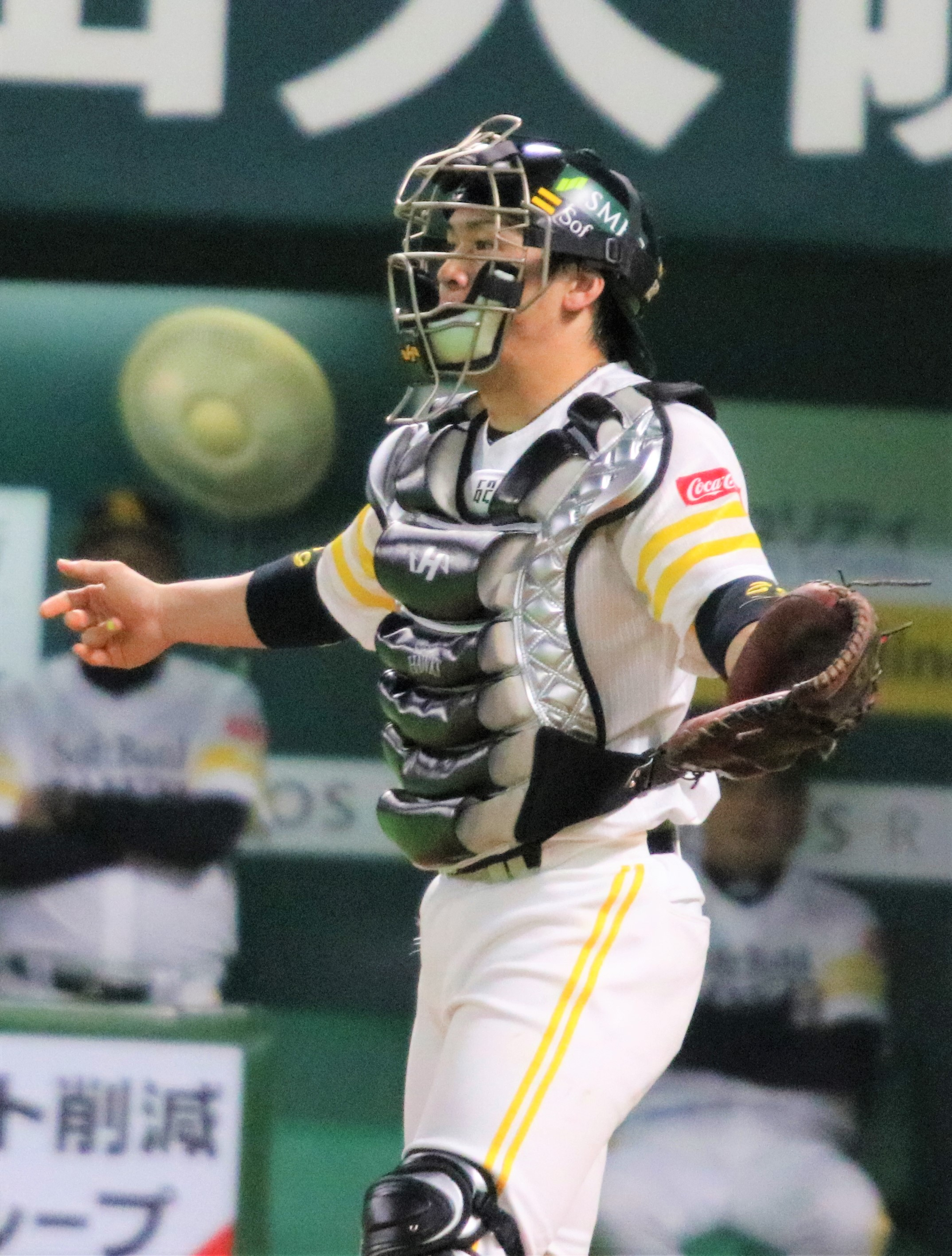
Takuya Kai won the Japan Series Most Valuable Player Award.

Saturday, November 3, 2018, 6:33 PM (JST) at Mazda Zoom-Zoom Stadium Hiroshima in Hiroshima, Hiroshima Prefecture
Team	1	2	3	4	5	6	7	8	9	R	H	E
SoftBank	0	0	0	1	1	0	0	0	0	2	3	0
Hiroshima	0	0	0	0	0	0	0	0	0	0	4	0
WP: Rick van den Hurk (1–1) LP: Kris Johnson (1–1) Sv: Yuito Mori (3); Home runs: SBH: Yurisbel Gracial (1); HIR: None; Attendance: 30,723

The series shifted back to Hiroshima for Game 6. Rick van den Hurk shut out the Carp for six innings. Tetsuro Nishida drove in a run for SoftBank in the fourth inning with a squeeze bunt that scored Yuki Yanagita. Yurisbel Gracial hit a solo home run in the fifth inning. Relief pitchers Shota Takeda, Shinya Kayama, and Yuito Mori completed the shutout of the Carp, as SoftBank repeated as Japan Series champs. Hawks' catcher Takuya Kai, who set a Japan Series record with six consecutive caught stealings, won the Japan Series Most Valuable Player Award.

== See also ==
- 2018 Korean Series
- 2018 World Series
