= 2016 Japan Series =

Team (Wins)	Managers	Season
Hokkaido Nippon-Ham Fighters (4)	Hideki Kuriyama	87–53–3 (.621), 2.5 GA
Hiroshima Toyo Carp (2)	Koichi Ogata	89–52–2 (.631), 17.5 GA
- Dates: October 22–29
- MVP: Brandon Laird (Hokkaido)
- FSA: Brad Eldred (Hiroshima)

Broadcast
- Television: TBS (Games 1, 4); Fuji TV (Game 2); TV Asahi (Games 3, 5); Nippon TV (Game 6)

The 2016 Japan Series was the 67th edition of Nippon Professional Baseball's postseason championship series for the 2016 season. The Hiroshima Toyo Carp, champions of the Central League, played the Hokkaido Nippon-Ham Fighters, champions of the Pacific League, in a best-of-seven series beginning on October 22. The Japan Series was sponsored by the Sumitomo Mitsui Banking Corporation (SMBC) and was officially known as the SMBC Nippon Series 2016.

The Fighters defeated the Carp in six games. Hiroshima took the first two games, and Hokkaido won the next four games to take the series. Hokkaido's Brandon Laird won the Japan Series Most Valuable Player Award, and Hiroshima's Brad Eldred won the Fighting Spirit Award, given to the best player on the losing team; it was the first time two foreign players won both awards. Anthony Bass, Sho Nakata, and Haruki Nishikawa won outstanding player honors.

== Climax Series ==
First Stage
Central League
2	Yomiuri Giants	1
3	Yokohama DeNA BayStars	2
Pacific League
2	Fukuoka SoftBank Hawks	2
3	Chiba Lotte Marines	0

Final Stage
1	Hiroshima Toyo Carp	4
3	Yokohama DeNA BayStars	1
1	Hokkaido Nippon-Ham Fighters	4
2	Fukuoka SoftBank Hawks	2

Japan Series
CL1	Hiroshima Toyo Carp	2
PL1	Hokkaido Nippon-Ham Fighters	4

== Series notes ==
The Hokkaido Nippon-Ham Fighters defeated the Fukuoka SoftBank Hawks in the Pacific League Climax Series, four games to two. Sho Nakata was named the most valuable player of the series. The Fighters last won the Japan Series in 2006. They lost the Japan Series in 2007, 2009, and 2012.

The Hiroshima Toyo Carp defeated the Yokohama DeNA BayStars in the Central League Climax Series, four games to one. Kosuke Tanaka was named the series' most valuable player. Hiroshima had not appeared in the Japan Series since 1991. Hiroshima pitcher Hiroki Kuroda announced that he would retire following the series.

== Summary ==
Hokkaido Nippon-Ham Fighters won the series, 4–2.

Game	Date	Score	Location	Time	Attendance
1	October 22	Hokkaido Nippon-Ham Fighters – 1, Hiroshima Toyo Carp – 5	Mazda Stadium	3:39	30,619
2	October 23	Hokkaido Nippon-Ham Fighters – 1, Hiroshima Toyo Carp – 5	Mazda Stadium	3:18	30,638
3	October 25	Hiroshima Toyo Carp – 3, Hokkaido Nippon-Ham Fighters – 4 (10)	Sapporo Dome	3:51	40,503
4	October 26	Hiroshima Toyo Carp – 1, Hokkaido Nippon-Ham Fighters – 3	Sapporo Dome	3:30	40,599
5	October 27	Hiroshima Toyo Carp – 1, Hokkaido Nippon-Ham Fighters – 5	Sapporo Dome	3:32	40,633
6	October 29	Hokkaido Nippon-Ham Fighters – 10, Hiroshima Toyo Carp – 4	Mazda Stadium	4:01	30,693

== Game summaries ==
=== Game 1 ===
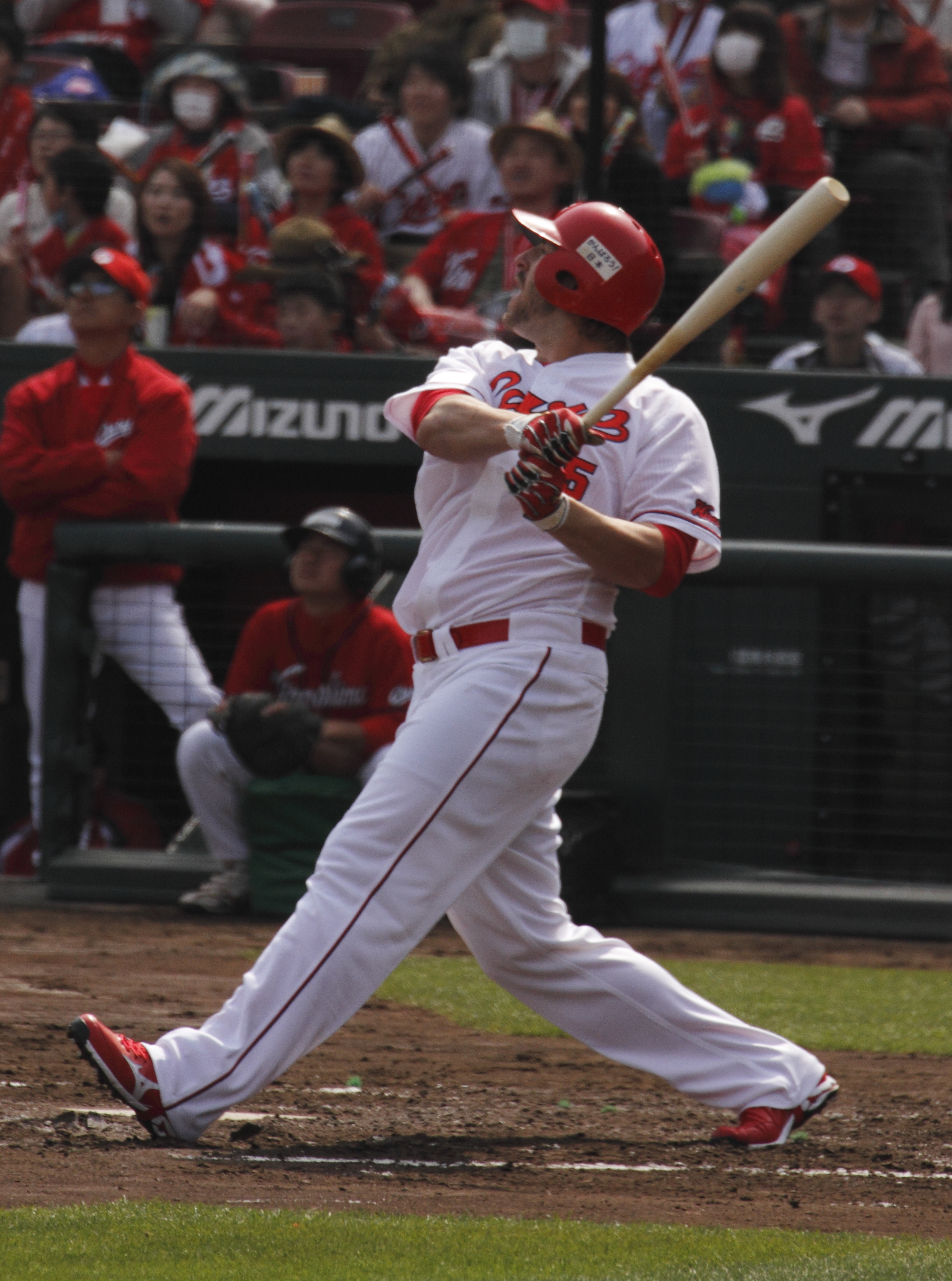
Brad Eldred hit home runs for Hiroshima in Games 1, 2, and 3

Saturday, October 22, 2016, 6:35 pm (JST) at Mazda Zoom-Zoom Stadium Hiroshima in Hiroshima, Hiroshima Prefecture
Team	1	2	3	4	5	6	7	8	9	R	H	E
Nippon-Ham	0	0	0	0	0	0	1	0	0	1	10	0
Hiroshima	0	1	0	2	0	0	2	0	X	5	7	0
WP: Kris Johnson (1–0) LP: Shohei Ohtani (0–1); Home runs: NHF: Brandon Laird (1); HIR: Ryuhei Matsuyama (1), Brad Eldred (1); Attendance: 30,619; Boxscore

Kris Johnson, the Carp's starting pitcher, allowed one run in 6 2/3 innings pitched, while Hokkaido's Shohei Ohtani allowed three runs in six innings. Hiroshima's Ryuhei Matsuyama and Brad Eldred both hit home runs off of Ohtani in the fourth inning, while Hokkaido's Brandon Laird hit a home run in the seventh inning. Hiroshima responded in the seventh inning with a run batted in (RBI) single by Yoshihiro Maru and a RBI sacrifice fly by Eldred.

=== Game 2 ===
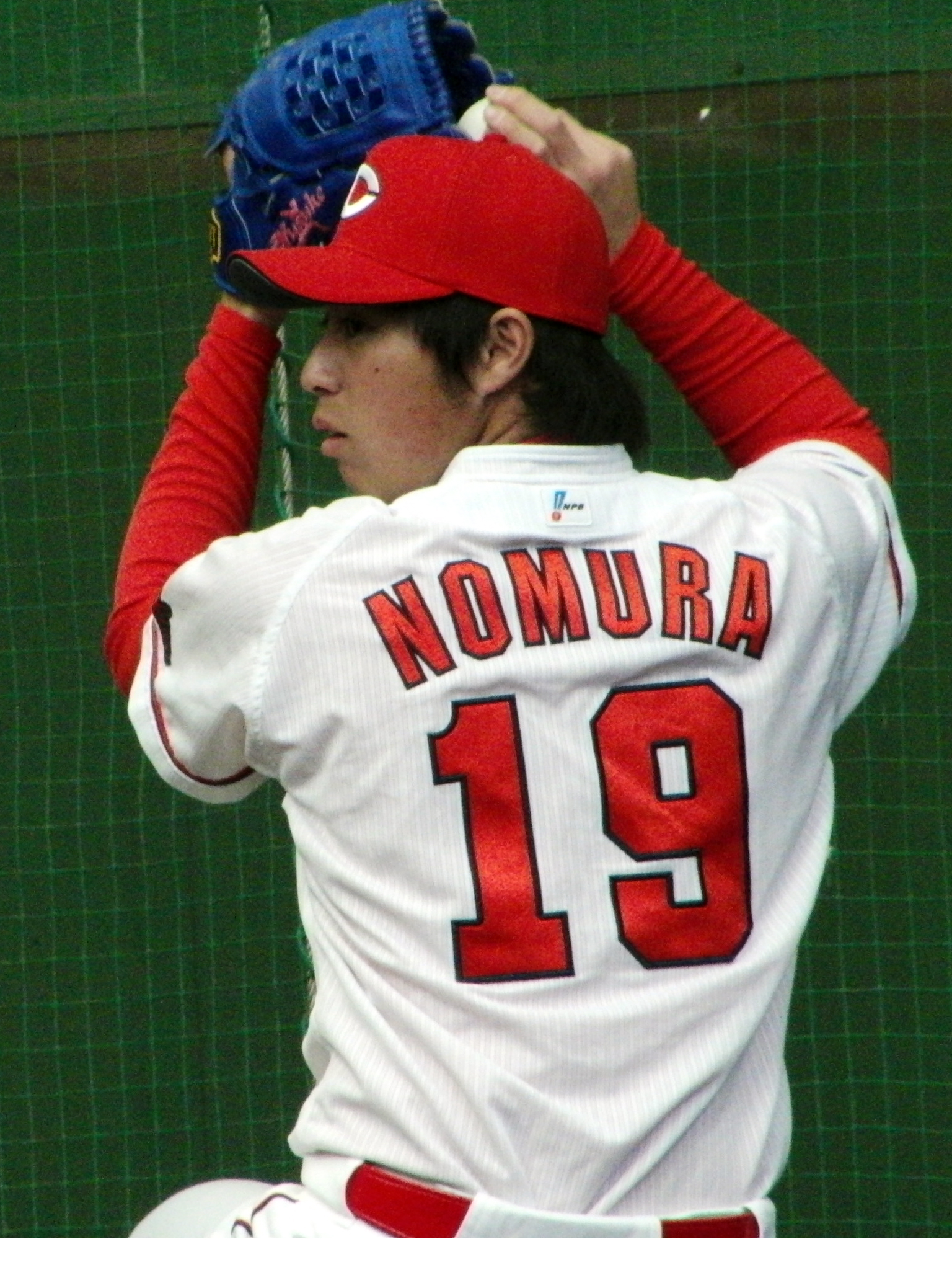
Yusuke Nomura earned the win for Hiroshima in Game 2

Sunday, October 23, 2016, 6:34 pm (JST) at Mazda Zoom-Zoom Stadium Hiroshima in Hiroshima, Hiroshima Prefecture
Team	1	2	3	4	5	6	7	8	9	R	H	E
Nippon-Ham	0	0	0	1	0	0	0	0	0	1	4	1
Hiroshima	0	1	0	0	0	4	0	0	X	5	7	1
WP: Yusuke Nomura (1–0) LP: Hirotoshi Masui (0–1); Home runs: NHF: None; HIR: Brad Eldred (2); Attendance: 30,638; Boxscore

Yui Kamiji threw the ceremonial first pitch. The Carp broke the game open with a four-run sixth inning, which included Eldred's second home run of the series. Yusuke Nomura, who led the Central League with 16 wins during the regular season, allowed one unearned run in six innings pitched for Hiroshima.

=== Game 3 ===
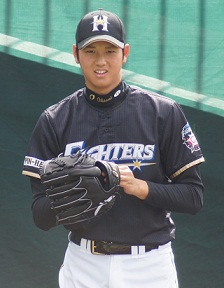
Shohei Ohtani drove in the game-winning run in Game 3

Tuesday, October 25, 2016, 6:33 pm (JST) at Sapporo Dome in Sapporo, Hokkaido
Team	1	2	3	4	5	6	7	8	9	10	R	H	E
Hiroshima	0	2	0	0	0	0	0	0	1	0	3	8	1
Nippon-Ham	1	0	0	0	0	0	0	2	0	1	4	6	0
WP: Anthony Bass (1–0) LP: Daichi Osera (0–1); Home runs: HIR: Brad Eldred (3); NHF: None; Attendance: 40,503; Boxscore

Kuroda allowed one run in 5 2/3 innings for the Carp, leaving the game due to a leg injury. Eldred hit a two-run home run, his third of the series. Hokkaido took the lead with a two RBI double by Sho Nakata in the eighth inning, and Tomohiro Abe tied the game for Hiroshima with an RBI single in the ninth inning. Ohtani, playing as Hokkaido's designated hitter, hit two doubles earlier in the game and drove in the game-winning run with an RBI single in the tenth inning, scoring Haruki Nishikawa.

=== Game 4 ===
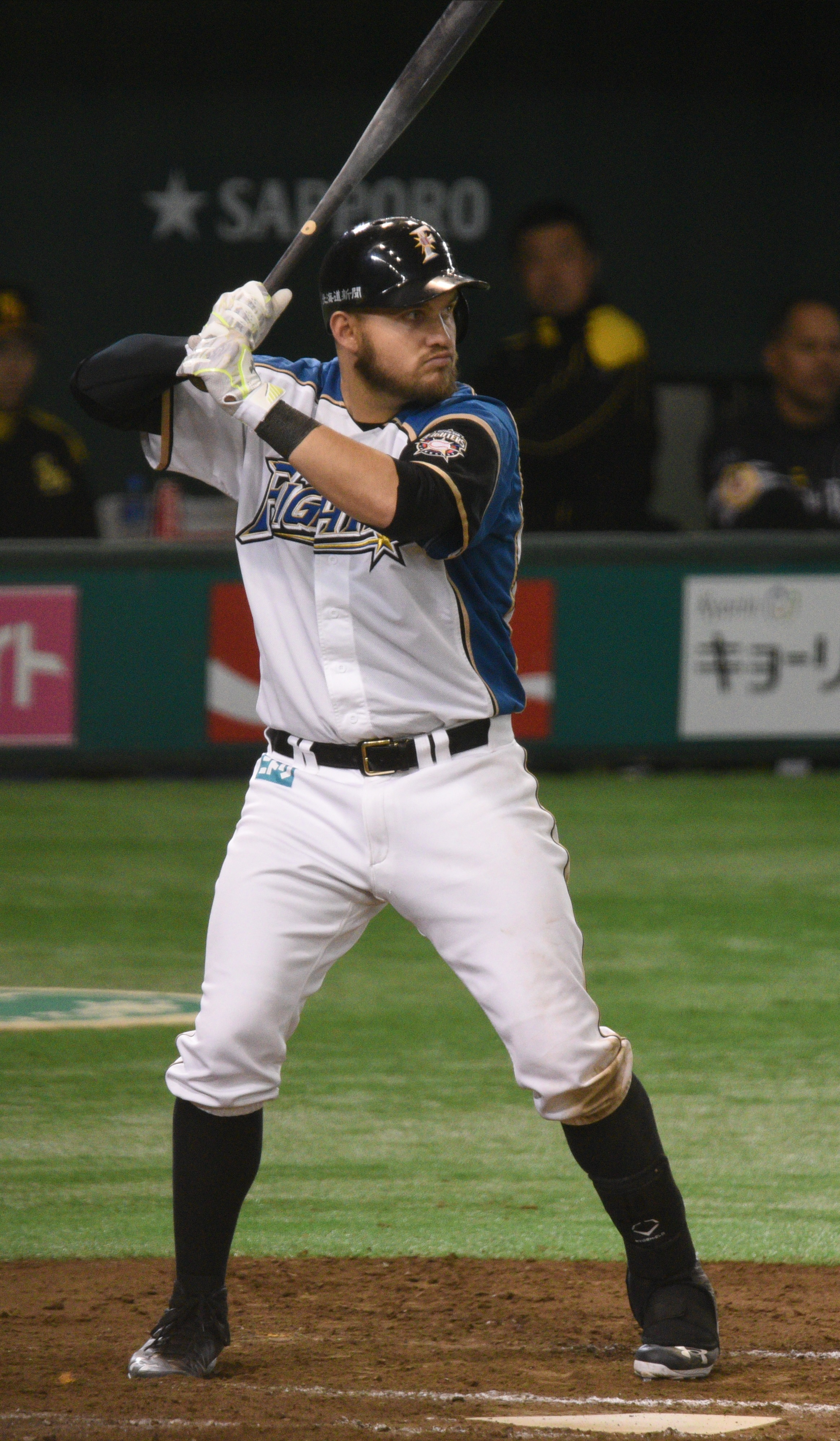
Brandon Laird hit the game-winning home run in Game 4

Wednesday, October 26, 2016, 6:31 pm (JST) at Sapporo Dome in Sapporo, Hokkaido
Team	1	2	3	4	5	6	7	8	9	R	H	E
Hiroshima	0	0	0	1	0	0	0	0	0	1	6	1
Nippon-Ham	0	0	0	0	0	1	0	2	X	3	5	1
WP: Keisuke Tanimoto (1–0) LP: Jay Jackson (0–1) Sv: Naoki Miyanishi (1); Home runs: HIR: None; NHF: Sho Nakata (1), Brandon Laird (2); Attendance: 40,599; Boxscore

Hiroshima took a 1–0 lead in the fourth inning, when Takahiro Arai scored on an error committed by Kensuke Kondo. Hokkaido's Sho Nakata hit a home run to tie the game in the sixth inning. Brandon Laird broke the tie with a two-run home run in the eighth inning for Hokkaido. Hiroshima had the bases loaded in the ninth inning, but Naoki Miyanishi recorded the save by striking out Yoshihiro Maru.

=== Game 5 ===
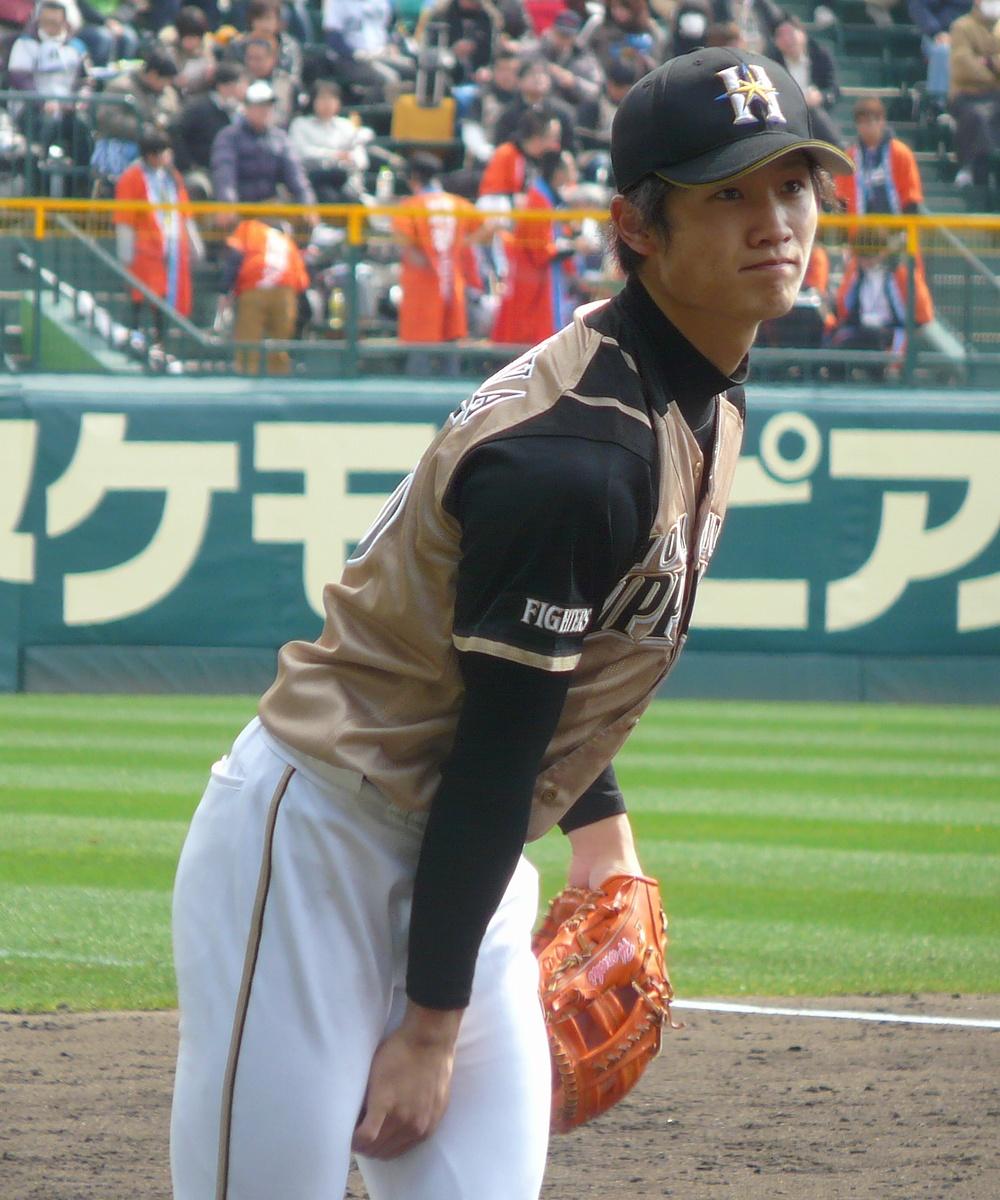
Haruki Nishikawa hit a walk-off grand slam in the ninth inning of Game 5.

Thursday, October 27, 2016, 6:03 pm (JST) at Sapporo Dome in Sapporo, Hokkaido
Team	1	2	3	4	5	6	7	8	9	R	H	E
Hiroshima	1	0	0	0	0	0	0	0	0	1	7	0
Nippon-Ham	0	0	0	0	0	0	1	0	4	5	7	0
WP: Anthony Bass (2–0) LP: Shota Nakazaki (0–1); Home runs: HIR: None; NHF: Haruki Nishikawa; Attendance: 40,633; Boxscore

Johnson started Game 5 for Hiroshima, while Takayuki Kato started for Hokkaido. Seiya Suzuki had an RBI single in the first inning for Hiroshima. Kato failed to complete the second inning, and Luis Mendoza threw 5 2/3 scoreless innings for the Fighters. Johnson did not allow a run in six innings pitched. Takuya Nakashima had an RBI single to tie the game for Hokkaido in the seventh inning. Nishikawa hit a walk-off grand slam in the bottom of the ninth inning for Hokkaido.

=== Game 6 ===
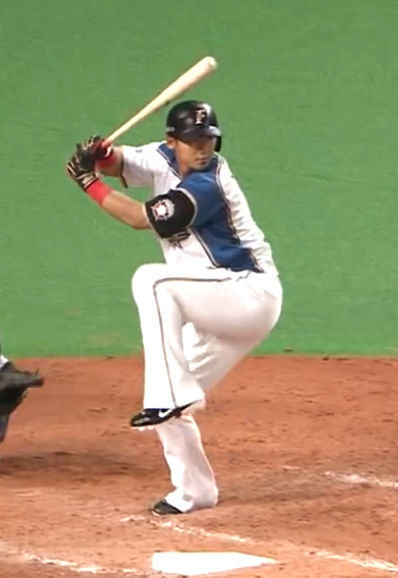
Sho Nakata earned outstanding player honors.

Saturday, October 29, 2016, 6:33 pm (JST) at Mazda Zoom-Zoom Stadium Hiroshima in Hiroshima, Hiroshima Prefecture
Team	1	2	3	4	5	6	7	8	9	R	H	E
Nippon-Ham	1	0	0	3	0	0	0	6	0	10	12	2
Hiroshima	0	2	0	0	1	1	0	0	0	4	7	1
WP: Anthony Bass (3–0) LP: Jay Jackson (0–2); Home runs: NHF: Brandon Laird (3); HIR: Yoshihiro Maru (1); Attendance: 30,693; Boxscore

With the game tied 4–4 in the eighth inning, Nakata drew a bases loaded walk, Anthony Bass hit an RBI single, and Laird hit a grand slam. Laird, who hit three home runs in the series, won the Japan Series Most Valuable Player Award, while Eldred won the Fighting Spirit Award, given to the best player on the losing team. Bass, Nakata, and Nishikawa earned outstanding player honors for the series.

== See also ==
- 2016 Korean Series
- 2016 World Series
