= Toshitake Yokoo =

Japanese baseball player (born 1993)

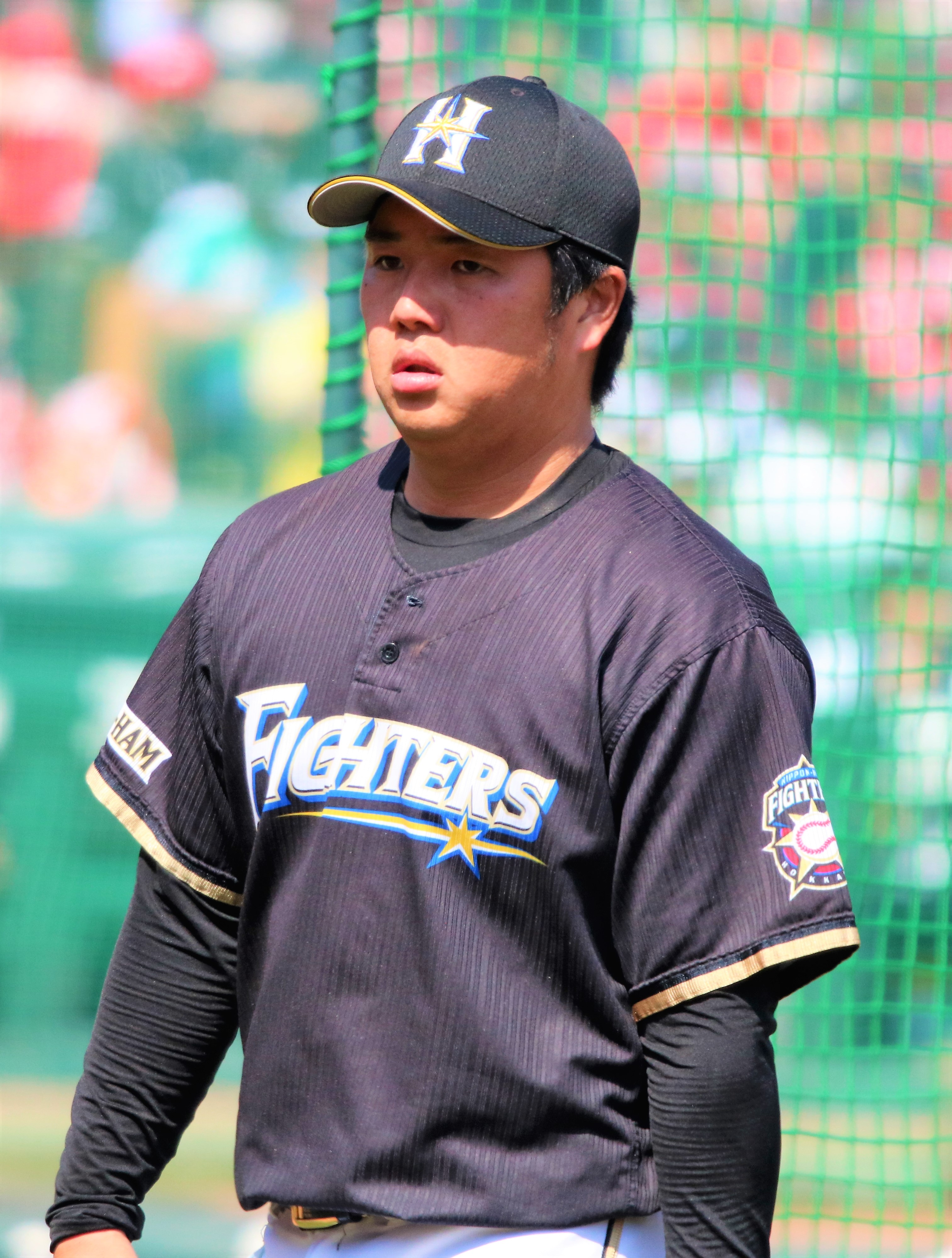

Hokkaido Nippon Ham Fighters – No. 81
- Infielder / Coach
- Born: May 27, 1993 (age 33)
- Batted: Right Threw: Right

NPB debut
- March 25, 2016, for the Hokkaido Nippon-Ham Fighters

Last appearance
- October 23, 2021, for the Tohoku Rakuten Golden Eagles

NPB statistics
- Batting average: .211
- Hits: 144
- Home runs: 21
- Runs batted in: 71
- Stolen base: 0

Teams
- As player: Hokkaido Nippon-Ham Fighters (2016–2021); Tohoku Rakuten Golden Eagles (2021–2023); As coach: Tohoku Rakuten Golden Eagles (2024); Hokkaido Nippon-Ham Fighters (2025–present)

Career highlights and awards
- 1× Japan Series champion (2016)

Toshitake Yokoo (横尾 俊建, Yokoo Toshitake; born May 27, 1993 in Tama, Tokyo) is a Japanese retired professional baseball infielder.
