= Takuya Nakashima =

Japanese baseball player (born 1991)

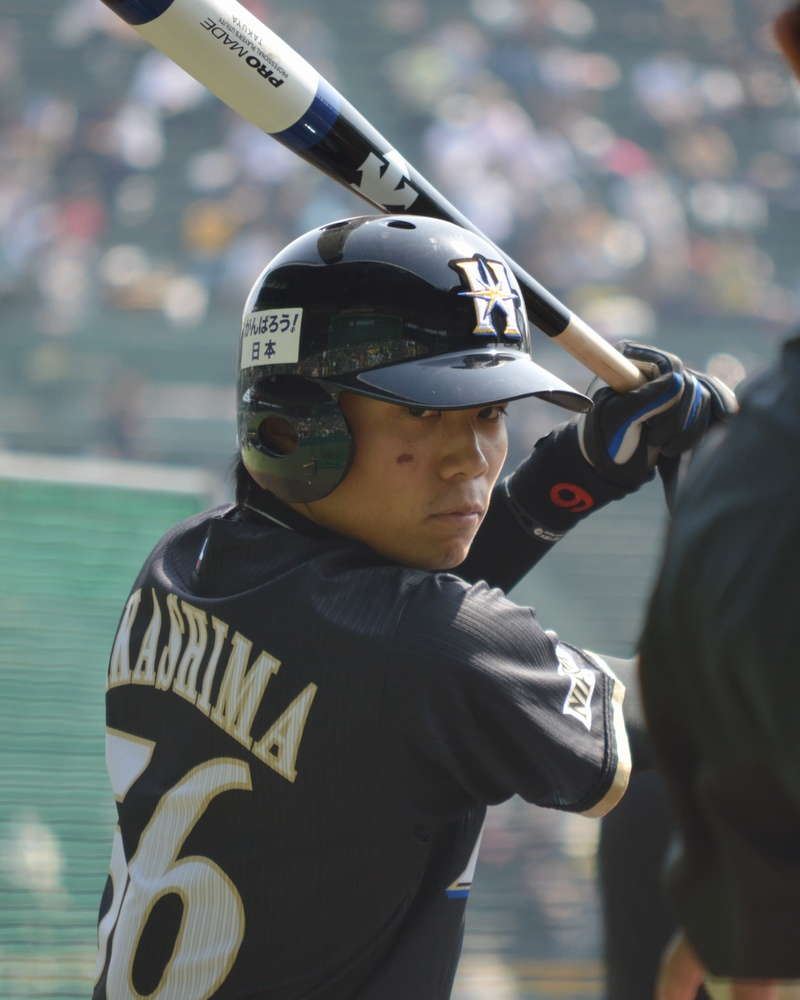
- Nakashima with the Hokkaido Nippon Ham Fighters

Hokkaido Nippon Ham Fighters – No. 9
- Infielder
- Born: January 11, 1991 (age 35); Fukuoka Prefecture, Japan
- Bats: Left Throws: Right

debut
- April 20, 2011, for the Hokkaido Nippon-Ham Fighters

NPB statistics (through 2023 season)
- Batting average: .237
- Hits: 721
- Home runs: 2
- Runs batted in: 178
- Stolen bases: 200
- Stats at Baseball Reference

Teams
- Hokkaido Nippon-Ham Fighters (2009–present)

Career highlights and awards
- 1× Pacific League stolen base champion (2015); 1× Pacific League Best Nine Award (2015); 1× NPB All-Star (2015); 1× Japan Series champion (2016)
Medals
Men's baseball
Representing Japan
2015 WBSC Premier12
Bronze medal – third place	2015 Tokyo	Team

Takuya Nakashima (中島 卓也, Nakashima Takuya; born January 11, 1991) is a Japanese professional baseball player for the Hokkaido Nippon-Ham Fighters of Nippon Professional Baseball (NPB).

== Career ==
He had 23 stolen bases in 2013.
