= Haruki Nishikawa =

Japanese baseball player (born 1992)

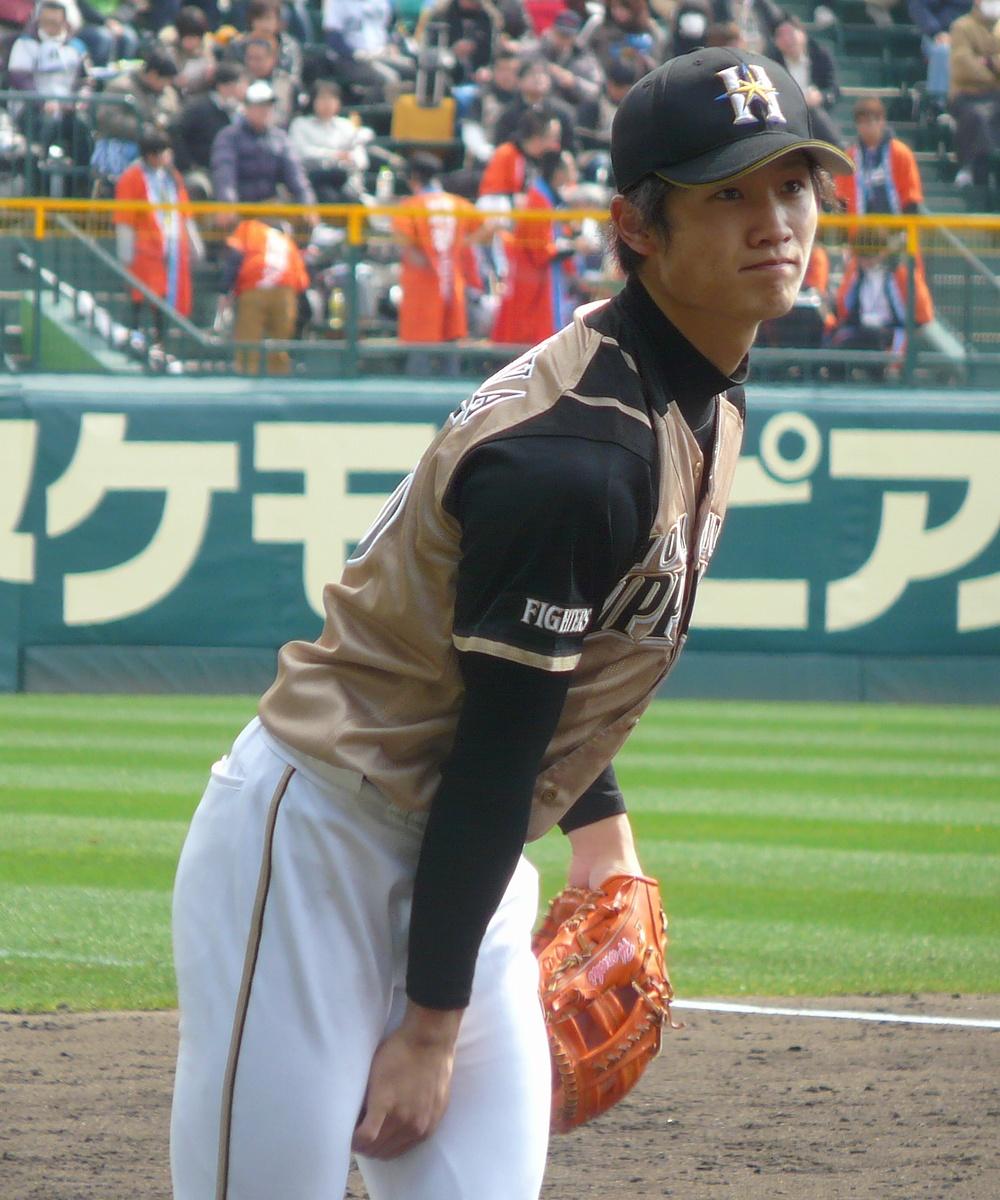
- Nishikawa with the Hokkaido Nippon Ham Fighters

Hokkaido Nippon-Ham Fighters – No. 7
- Infielder / Outfielder
- Born: April 16, 1992 (age 33); Wakayama Prefecture, Japan
- Bats: Left Throws: Right

NPB debut
- March 30, 2012, for the Hokkaido Nippon-Ham Fighters

NPB statistics (through 2025 season)
- Batting average: .271
- Hits: 1,426
- Home runs: 63
- Runs batted in: 452
- Stolen Bases: 343
- Stats at Baseball Reference

Teams
- Hokkaido Nippon-Ham Fighters (2011–2021); Tohoku Rakuten Golden Eagles (2022–2023); Tokyo Yakult Swallows (2024–2025); Hokkaido Nippon-Ham Fighters (2026–)

Career highlights and awards
- 4× Pacific League stolen base champion (2014, 2017, 2018, 2021); 2× Pacific League Best Nine Award (2016, 2017); 4× Pacific League Golden Glove Award (2017–2020); Japan Series champion (2016); 2× NPB All-Star (2017, 2019)

Haruki Nishikawa (西川 遥輝, Nishikawa Haruki; born April 16, 1992) is a Japanese professional baseball infielder and outfielder for the Hokkaido Nippon-Ham Fighters of Nippon Professional Baseball (NPB). He has previously played in Nippon Professional Baseball (NPB) for the Tokyo Yakult Swallows.

== Career ==
=== Hokkaido Nippon-Ham Fighters ===
Hokkaido Nippon-Ham Fighters selected Nishikawa in the second round of the 2010 Nippon Professional Baseball draft.

On March 30, 2012, Nishikawa made his NPB debut as a pinch runner against the Saitama Seibu Lions.

Nishikawa hit a walk-off grand slam in the bottom of the ninth inning of Game 5 of the 2016 Japan Series, which Nishikawa would go on to win.

On February 27, 2019, Nishikawa was selected for the first time for Japan national baseball team at the 2019 exhibition games against Mexico.

In 2020, Nishikawa hit .296/.419/.388 with 5 home runs, 15 doubles, and 3 triples to go along with 37 stolen bases. After the 2020 season, on December 3, 2020, the Fighters announced it was allowing Nishikawa to enter the posting system to play in Major League Baseball (MLB). On January 3, 2021, Nishikawa failed to secure a deal with any of the MLB teams. Nishikawa became a free agent following the 2021 season.

=== Tohoku Rakuten Golden Eagles ===
On December 22, 2021, Nishikawa signed with the Tohoku Rakuten Golden Eagles of Nippon Professional Baseball.

=== Tokyo Yakult Swallows ===
On November 17, 2023, Nishikawa signed with the Tokyo Yakult Swallows of Nippon Professional Baseball.

Nishikawa made 49 appearances for Yakult in 2025, batting .174/.280/.217 with six RBI and one stolen base. On September 29, 2025, the Swallows announced that they would be releasing Nishikawa.

=== Hokkaido Nippon-Ham Fighters (second stint) ===
In November 2025, Nishikawa signed with the Hokkaido Nippon-Ham Fighters of Nippon Professional Baseball.
