= Kenjiro Tanaka =

Japanese baseball player

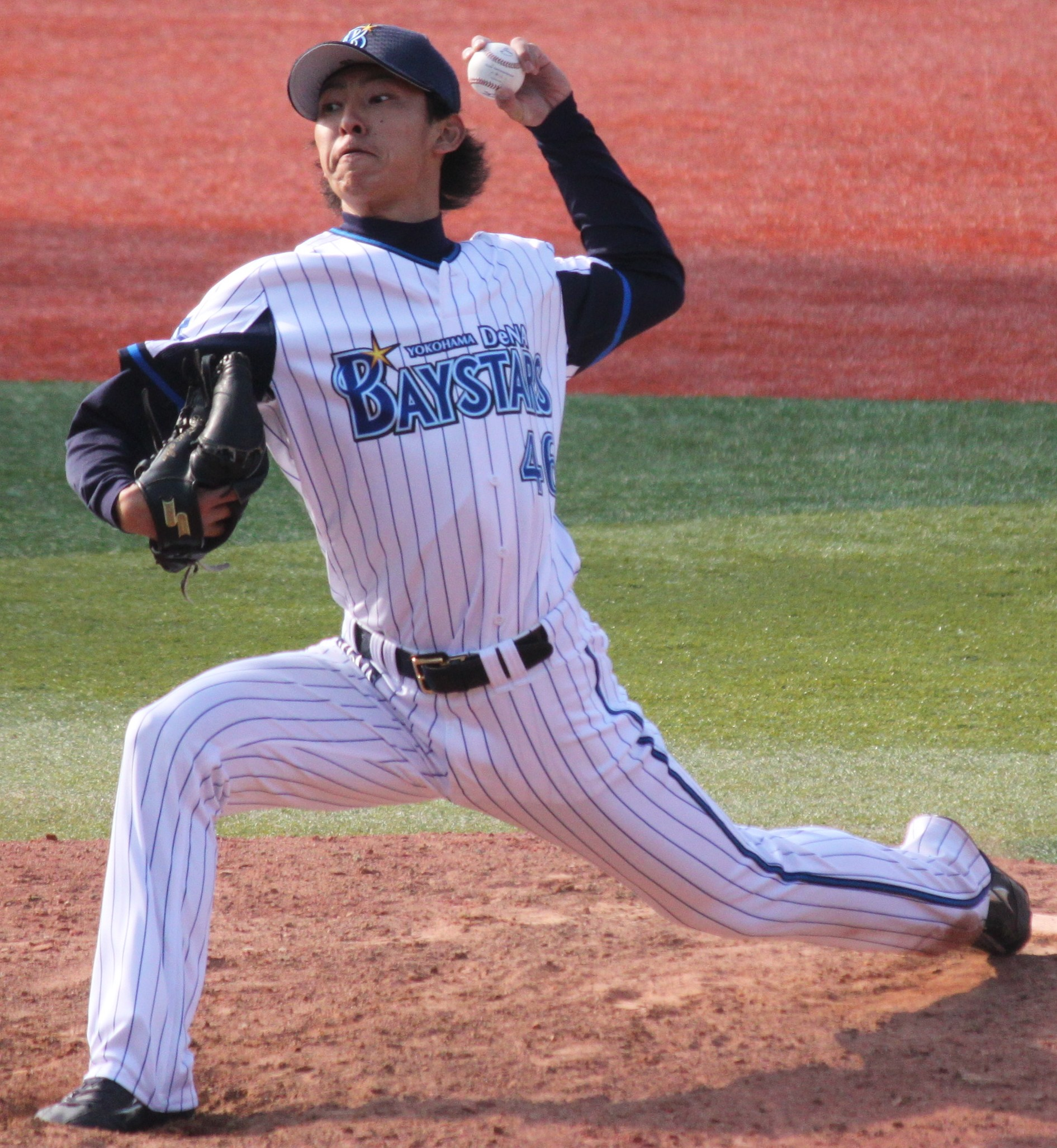
- Tanaka with the Yokohama DeNA BayStars

Kufu HAYATE Ventures Shizuoka – No. 46
- Pitcher
- Born: September 18, 1989 (age 36); Shinshiro, Aichi, Japan
- Bats: Left Throws: Left

debut
- September 11, 2010, for the Yokohama BayStars

Career statistics (through April 6, 2022)
- Win–loss record: 11–13
- Earned Run Average: 3.77
- Strikeouts: 197
- Stats at Baseball Reference

Teams
- Yokohama BayStars/Yokohama DeNA BayStars (2008–2023); Kufu HAYATE Ventures Shizuoka (2024-2025)

Career highlights and awards
- 1× NPB All-Star (2015)

Kenjiro Tanaka (田中 健二朗, Tanaka Kenjirō; born September 18, 1989) is a professional Japanese baseball player. He plays pitcher for the Kufu HAYATE Ventures Shizuoka.
