= Seiya Suzuki =

Japanese baseball player (born 1994)

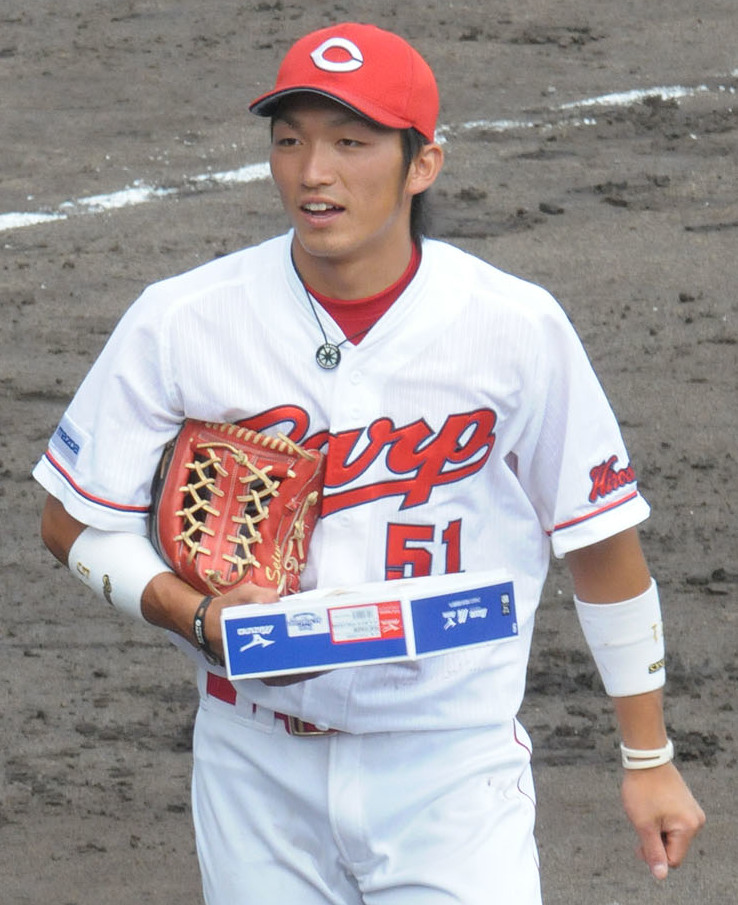
- Suzuki with the Hiroshima Toyo Carp in 2013

Free agent
- Right fielder / Designated Hitter
- Born: August 18, 1994 (age 32); Arakawa, Tokyo, Japan
- Bats: Right Throws: Right

Professional debut
- NPB: September 14, 2013, for the Hiroshima Toyo Carp
- MLB: April 7, 2022, for the Chicago Cubs

NPB statistics (through 2021 season)
- Batting average: .315
- Hits: 937
- Home runs: 182
- Runs batted in: 562

MLB statistics (through 2026 season)
- Batting average: .269
- Hits: 683
- Home runs: 113
- Runs batted in: 382
- Stats at Baseball Reference

Teams
- Hiroshima Toyo Carp (2013–2021); Chicago Cubs (2022–2026)

Career highlights and awards
- 5× NPB All-Star (2016–2019, 2021); 6× Best Nine Award (2016–2021); 5× Golden Glove Award (2016, 2017, 2019–2021); 2× CL batting champion (2019, 2021)
Medals
Men's baseball
Representing Japan
Summer Olympics
Gold medal – first place	2020 Tokyo	Team
WBSC Premier12
Gold medal – first place	2019 Tokyo	Team
21U Baseball World Cup
Silver medal – second place	2014 Taichung	Team

Seiya Suzuki (鈴木 誠也, Suzuki Seiya; Japanese pronunciation: [sɯ̥dzɯꜜkʲi̥ seːꜜja], born August 18, 1994) is a Japanese professional baseball right fielder and designated hitter who is a free agent. He has played in Major League Baseball (MLB) for the Chicago Cubs and in Nippon Professional Baseball (NPB) for the Hiroshima Toyo Carp. Suzuki is a five-time NPB All-Star, six-time NPB Best Nine Award winner, and a five-time winner of the NPB Golden Glove Award. Internationally, Suzuki represents Japan.

Seiya Suzuki is the third Cubs player in the last 100 seasons to start his career with an eight-game hitting streak, joining Andy Pafko (nine in 1943) and Joe Munson (nine in 1925). He is the second Japanese player with an eight-game hit streak to begin his MLB career.

== Professional career ==
=== Hiroshima Toyo Carp (2013–2021) ===
==== 2013–2014: Minor leagues ====
The Hiroshima Toyo Carp drafted Suzuki in the second round of the 2012 NPB draft. He was mainly a pitcher during his high school career and was drafted as such, but switched to an infielder upon joining the team. Suzuki was given #51 as his uniform number.

Suzuki made his NPB debut on September 14, 2013, at the age of 19 and appeared in 11 games, spending most of the season in the farm system.

Suzuki continued to spend most of the 2014 season in the farm system, playing 36 games with a batting average of .344, an on-base percentage of .382, and a slugging percentage of .500.

==== 2015: Switch to outfield ====
Before the 2015 season, the Carp changed Suzuki's position designation from an infielder to an outfielder. Suzuki started the season with a spot on the opening day starting lineup, and eventually played in 97 games, hitting five home runs with a batting average of .275, an on-base percentage of .329, and a slugging percentage of .403.

==== 2016: Emergence ====
Suzuki could not make the 2016 opening day roster due to a hamstring strain he suffered during spring training, and returned to the team on April 5. Suzuki made his first NPB All-Star Series appearance this year, recording his first hit on the 1st game of the series, and his first RBI on the 2nd. Suzuki led the team in batting average (.335), home runs (29) and OPS (1.016), winning the Gold Glove Award and the Best Nine Award. He had also helped drive the Carp to their first pennant in twenty five years.

==== 2017: Continued success ====
Suzuki made his second consecutive All-Star appearance, receiving the most votes among Central League outfielders. On August 23, Suzuki left the game due to an ankle injury. Six days later, the Carp announced that he underwent surgery to treat a malleolar fracture on his right tibia and a deltoid ligament injury, ending his 2017 season. He finished the season batting .300/.389/.547 with 26 home runs, 90 RBIs and 16 stolen bases, and led the Central League with a .936 OPS.

End of the season awards for Suzuki included his second consecutive Gold Glove Award and Best Nine Award.

==== 2018: Face of the Carp ====
On April 4, 2018, Suzuki was removed from the roster after experiencing muscle stiffness in his lower body. He was reactivated on the 18th. Suzuki was named for his third consecutive NPB All-Star Series, and marked his first All-Star game home run off of Yusei Kikuchi.

Suzuki finished the season batting .320/.438/.618, with 30 home runs and 94 RBIs. The Carp won their third consecutive Central League pennant that year, and went on to face the Fukuoka Softbank Hawks in the Japan Series. While his team lost the series, Suzuki hit 10-for-22 (.455) with three home runs and six RBIs during the Japan Series.

Suzuki won his third consecutive Best Nine Award. On November 19, the team announced that Suzuki's uniform number would be changed to #1.

==== 2019: First CL batting title ====
Suzuki was named for his fourth consecutive NPB All-Star Series after receiving the most votes among all Central League players. On July 13, he won the 2019 NPB Home Run Derby, defeating Orix Buffaloes outfielder Masataka Yoshida 4–3 in the final round.

For the season, Suzuki appeared in a career-high 140 games, leading the NPB in batting average (.335), OBP (.453), OPS (1.018) with 112 runs scored (first in the Central League), 28 home runs (ninth), 87 RBIs (ninth), 25 stolen bases (fourth). After the season, Suzuki was awarded his fourth consecutive Best Nine Award and his third Gold Glove.

==== 2020: COVID-19 season ====
In the COVID-19-affected 2020 season, Suzuki played in 118 games for Hiroshima, slashing .300/.409/.544 with 25 home runs and 75 RBI. Following the season, Suzuki was awarded his fourth career Central League Golden Glove Award and his fifth career Best Nine Award.

==== 2021: Second CL batting title ====
In 2021, Suzuki played in 132 games for the Carp, setting a career-high in home runs, with 38, to go along with 88 RBI and a .317/.433/.636 slash line. Suzuki was the Central League batting champion and on-base percentage leader and was named a NPB All-Star for the fifth time in his career. He was also awarded his fifth career Central League Golden Glove Award and sixth career, and sixth straight Best Nine Award.

=== Chicago Cubs (2022–present) ===
==== 2022: First season in MLB ====
Following the 2021 season, on November 22, 2021, Suzuki was posted by Hiroshima and made available to all 30 Major League Baseball (MLB) teams, opening a 30-day period to negotiate a contract. However, due to the 2021–22 MLB lockout, Suzuki's 30-day posting window was paused. On March 18, 2022, Suzuki officially agreed to a five-year contract with the Chicago Cubs worth $85 million. He went .235/.350/.558 with two home runs, four hits, and 10 total bases during the 2022 Spring Training. Suzuki made his Cubs debut on April 7, 2022, working a full-count walk against Corbin Burnes in his first MLB plate appearance. He was the first Cub to make their MLB debut as an Opening Day starter since Kosuke Fukudome in 2008. Suzuki collected his first major league hit in the 5th inning of that game, a line drive single to shallow left field off of Burnes. On April 10, he hit his first major league home run, a three-run shot off of Milwaukee starter Freddy Peralta. Suzuki was awarded the National League Player of the Week award for April 11–17, a span in which he batted .412 (7-17) with five runs, three home runs, five RBI, and an OPS of 1.604. Suzuki was also named the NL Rookie of the Month for April. He injured his left ring finger while stealing second base on May 26 against the Cincinnati Reds and was placed on the 10-day injured list (IL). After three injury rehabilitation games with Iowa, he returned for the first time in 39 days on July 4 against the Milwaukee Brewers. On September 30, 2022, he hit his 100th career hit, a single off Cincinnati starter Graham Ashcraft in the bottom of the third inning. Suzuki finished the season batting .262/.336/.433 in 111 games with 14 home runs and 46 runs batted in.

==== 2023 ====
In 2023, Suzuki suffered left oblique tightness before the 2023 World Baseball Classic and because of that, he withdrew from Japan's roster for the World Baseball Classic. Due to that same tightness, Suzuki missed the first 11 games of the 2023 season. He made his 2023 debut against the Los Angeles Dodgers on April 14 where he went 1-for-5 with a solo home run in the top of the 8th inning off Andre Jackson. On August 21, he recorded his 200th career major hit when he hit a single to left field off starting pitcher Alex Faedo. On September 15, Suzuki collected his 100 career RBI against the Arizona Diamondbacks when he hit a two-run home run in the top of the 9th inning. On September 27, 2023, against the Atlanta Braves, Suzuki missed a routine fly ball off the bat of catcher Sean Murphy, allowing the tying and eventual winning runs to score. Afterward, Suzuki said the lights at Truist Park played a part in the error, but he refused to use that as an excuse. "I was seeing it pretty well until the very last second," Suzuki said through his interpreter. "I honestly thought it went into my glove. So it was just that split second where I blurred my vision. Ever since I was playing in Japan you do have to take that [the lights] into consideration...If I do say that, then it's an excuse, so I'm not going to say that." Suzuki finished the season batting .285/.357/.485 in 138 games with 20 home runs and 74 runs batted in.

==== 2024 ====
On April 15, 2024, Suzuki was placed on the 10-day injured list with a right oblique strain after tweaking his oblique running to first base against the Seattle Mariners. He didn't play for 23 games due to the injury but got activated from the injured list on May 10 prior before the Cubs start a three-game road series against the Pittsburgh Pirates. On June 22 versus the New York Mets, Suzuki recorded his 300th career major hit off starting pitcher Tylor Megill in the bottom of the first inning by hitting a RBI single, scoring Michael Busch. On August 24, 2024, against the Miami Marlins, Suzuki hit his 50th career home run as he went for 3-for-5 with two home runs, a triple, four RBI, and three runs scored as the Cubs powered the Marlins with 14-2. Suzuki finished the season batting .283/.366/.482 in 132 games with 21 home runs and 73 runs batted in.

==== 2025 ====
On May 26, 2025, Suzuki was awarded the National League Player of the Week award for May 19–25, a span in which he batted .480 (12–25) with nine runs, three home runs, 10 RBI, and an OPS of 1.552. At the time of the All-Star selections, Suzuki led the MLB with 77 RBIs, becoming only the second player to enter the break with at least 25 home runs, 75 RBIs and 20 doubles to not be named an All-Star with the other being Hank Greenberg 90 years prior. Suzuki finished the season batting .245/.326/.478 in 151 games with 32 home runs and 103 runs batted in.

== International career ==
Suzuki represented the Japan national baseball team in the 2017 World Baseball Classic and 2019 WBSC Premier12.

On October 1, 2019, he was selected at the 2019 WBSC Premier12. He was named the tournament MVP, after leading the tournament with a .478 batting average, .567 OBP, 1.130 slugging percentage, two triples, nine runs, and 12 RBIs and tying for the lead with 11 hits and three home runs.

On June 16, 2021, he was selected to Team Japan for the 2020 Summer Olympics.

== Player profile ==
Suzuki is a 5 ft 11 in (1.80 m), 182 lb (83 kg) outfielder that is considered a five-tool player due to his high batting averages, home run totals, baserunning, fielding abilities, and throwing abilities. He posted a career .315 batting average in NPB and won the league's batting title in 2019 with a .335 average. In his final five seasons with Hiroshima, Suzuki hit at least 25 home runs each year, including a career-high 38 in 2021. A month into his rookie season with Chicago, Suzuki averaged a 28.6 feet per second sprint speed, ranking 12th in the major leagues at the time and first among right fielders. His swing speed, hard-hit, and chase rates are in the higher percentiles in the MLB; showing that he has power-hitter ability while still being a disciplined hitter. Suzuki also pitched while in high school, reaching 92 miles per hour (148 km/h) on his fastball.

Suzuki has received player comparisons to A. J. Pollock as well as Mike Trout, the latter of which he chose his jersey number 27 in honor of.

== Personal life ==
Suzuki married former Olympic rhythmic gymnast Airi Hatakeyama on December 7, 2019.

He went to the same middle school as Japanese actress Seika Furuhata and knew each other through a mutual friend.

== Career statistics ==
=== Hitting ===
Year	Team	G	PA	AB	R	H	2B	3B	HR	TB	RBI	SB	CS	SAC	SF	BB	IBB	HBP	SO	GIDP	AVG	OBP	SLG	OPS
2013	Hiroshima	11	14	12	0	1	0	0	0	1	1	0	0	0	0	1	0	1	1	1	.083	.214	.083	.298
2014	Hiroshima	36	68	64	6	22	7	0	1	32	7	0	0	0	0	4	0	0	13	2	.344	.382	.500	.882
2015	Hiroshima	97	238	211	21	58	6	3	5	85	25	6	7	7	2	16	0	2	38	3	.275	.329	.403	.742
2016	Hiroshima	129	528	466	76	156	26	8	29	285	95	16	11	3	3	53	1	3	79	10	.335	.404	.612	1.015
2017	Hiroshima	115	512	437	85	131	28	1	26	239	90	16	6	0	7	62	0	6	80	12	.300	.389	.547	.936
2018	Hiroshima	124	520	422	86	135	32	2	30	261	94	4	4	0	5	88	2	5	116	4	.320	.438	.618	1.057
2019	Hiroshima	140	612	499	112	167	31	0	28	282	87	25	16	0	3	103	12	7	81	3	.335	.453	.565	1.018
2020	Hiroshima	118	514	430	85	129	26	2	25	234	75	6	4	0	3	72	9	9	73	15	.300	.409	.544	.953
2021	Hiroshima	132	533	435	77	138	26	0	38	278	88	9	4	0	5	87	11	6	88	7	.317	.433	.639	1.072
2022	CHC	111	446	397	54	104	22	2	14	172	46	9	5	0	3	42	3	4	110	8	.262	.336	.433	.770
2023	CHC	138	583	515	75	147	31	6	20	250	74	6	7	0	7	59	3	2	130	8	.285	.357	.485	.842
2024	CHC	132	585	512	74	145	27	6	21	247	73	16	6	0	4	63	3	6	160	6	.283	.351	.479	.830
2025	CHC	135	588	517	69	126	29	3	27	242	89	5	2	0	7	64	1	0	150	12	.244	.323	.468	.791
NPB totals		902	3,539	2,976	548	937	182	16	182	1,697	562	82	52	10	28	486	35	39	569	57	.283	.366	.482	.822
MLB totals		516	2,202	1,941	272	522	109	17	82	911	282	36	20	0	21	228	10	12	550	34	.269	.346	.469	.815

=== Fielding ===
Year	Team	3B						Outfielder						RF						LF					
Year	Team	G	PO	A	E	DP	FPCT	G	PO	A	E	DP	FPCT	G	PO	A	E	DP	FPCT	G	PO	A	E	DP	FPCT
2013	Hiroshima	-						4	4	0	0	0	1.000	-						-					
2014	Hiroshima	3	0	2	1	0	.667	21	11	1	0	0	1.000	-						-					
2015	Hiroshima	-						77	91	2	1	0	.989	-						-					
2016	Hiroshima	-						127	211	3	2	1	.991	-						-					
2017	Hiroshima	-						115	209	10	6	2	.973	-						-					
2018	Hiroshima	-						116	180	8	4	3	.979	-						-					
2019	Hiroshima	-						139	242	6	3	1	.988	-						-					
2020	Hiroshima	-						118	210	8	2	0	.991	-						-					
2021	Hiroshima	-						125	254	13	3	4	.989	-						-					
2022	CHC	-						106	201	3	4	2	.981	106	201	3	4	2	.981	-					
2023	CHC	-						132	221	2	3	1	.987	132	221	2	3	1	.987	-					
2024	CHC	-						73	150	5	3	3	.981	72	150	5	3	3	.981	1	0	0	0	0	.000
2025	CHC	-						35	67	1	3	1	.958	19	34	0	3	0	.919	15	29	1	0	1	1.000
NPB totals		3	0	2	1	0	.667	842	1,412	51	21	11	.986	-						-					
MLB totals		-						346	663	11	13	7	.980	329	606	10	13	6	.979	16	29	1	0	1	1.000
