= Takayuki Kajitani =

Japanese baseball player (born 1988)

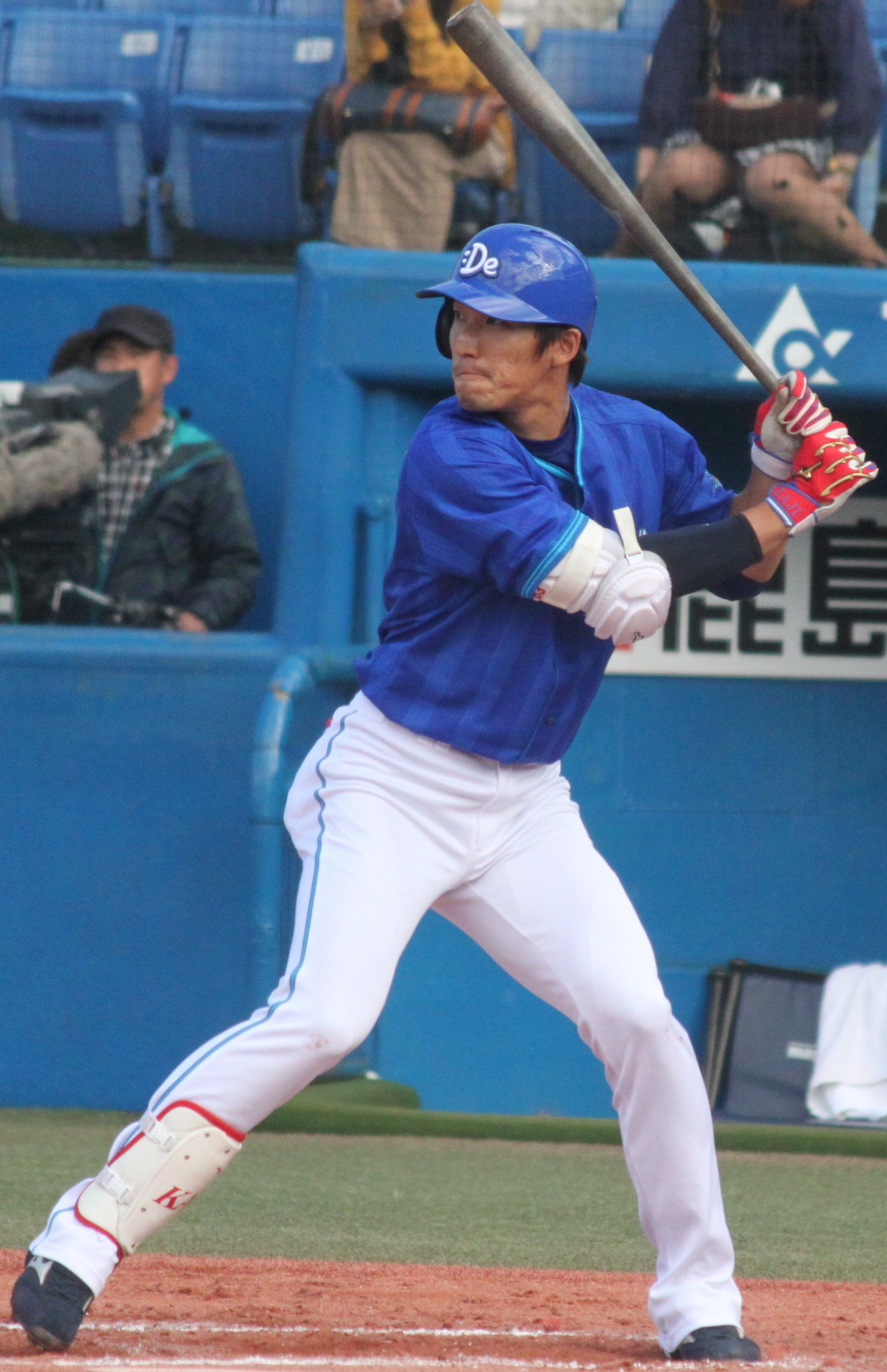
- Kajitani with the Yokohama DeNA BayStars
- Outfielder
- Born: August 28, 1988 (age 37); Matsue, Shimane, Japan
- Batted: Left Threw: Right

NPB debut
- April 9, 2009, for the Yokohama BayStars

Last NPB appearance
- May 4, 2024, for the Yomiuri Giants

NPB statistics
- Batting average: .270
- Home runs: 126
- Runs batted in: 441
- Stolen bases: 162
- Stats at Baseball Reference

Teams
- Yokohama BayStars/Yokohama DeNA BayStars (2007–2020); Yomiuri Giants (2021–2024)

Career highlights and awards
- 1× Central League stolen base champion (2014); 1× NPB All-Star (2015)

Takayuki Kajitani (梶谷 隆幸, Kajitani Takayuki; born August 28, 1988) is a Japanese former professional baseball outfielder. He played in Nippon Professional Baseball (NPB) from 2007 to 2024 for the Yokohama BayStars/Yokohama DeNA BayStars and Yomiuri Giants.

== Career ==
=== Yokohama DeNA BayStars ===
On September 25, 2006, Kajitani was drafted by the Yokohama BayStars in the 2006 Nippon Professional Baseball draft.

In 2007–2008 season, he played in the Eastern League of NPB's minor leagues.

On April 9, 2009, Kajitani debuted in the Central League against the Yomiuri Giants.

=== Yomiuri Giants ===
During the 2020 offseason, Kajitani exercised his free agent option, and he decided to sign a four–year contract with the Yomiuri Giants worth up to 800 million yen.

Kajitani played in 6 games for Yomiuri in 2024, going 3–for–16 (.188) with 1 home run and 2 RBI. On October 23, 2024, Kajitani announced his retirement from professional baseball.
