= Ryuhei Matsuyama =

Japanese baseball player (born 1985)

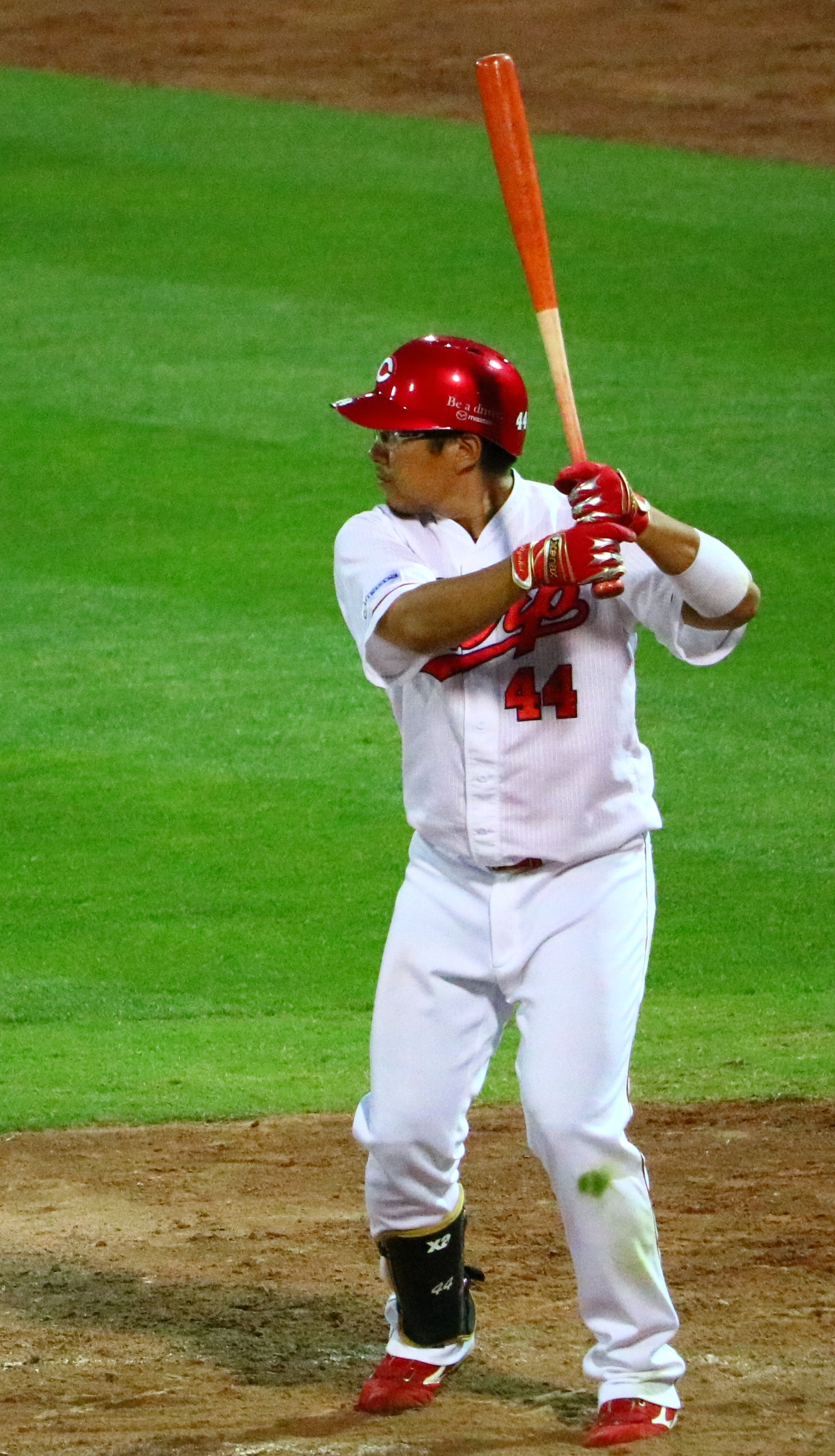
- Outfielder
- Born: September 18, 1985 (age 40); Soo District, Kagoshima, Japan
- Batted: Left Threw: Right

NPB debut
- April 24, 2008, for the Hiroshima Toyo Carp

Last NPB appearance
- 2025, for the Hiroshima Toyo Carp

NPB statistics
- Batting average: .278
- Home runs: 83
- Runs batted in: 535
- Stats at Baseball Reference

Teams
- Hiroshima Toyo Carp (2008, 2011–2025)

Ryuhei Matsuyama (松山 竜平, Matsuyama Ryuhei; born September 18, 1985 in Soo District, Kagoshima, Japan) is a professional Japanese baseball player. He plays outfielder for the Hiroshima Toyo Carp.
