= Tomohiro Abe =

Japanese baseball player (born 1989)

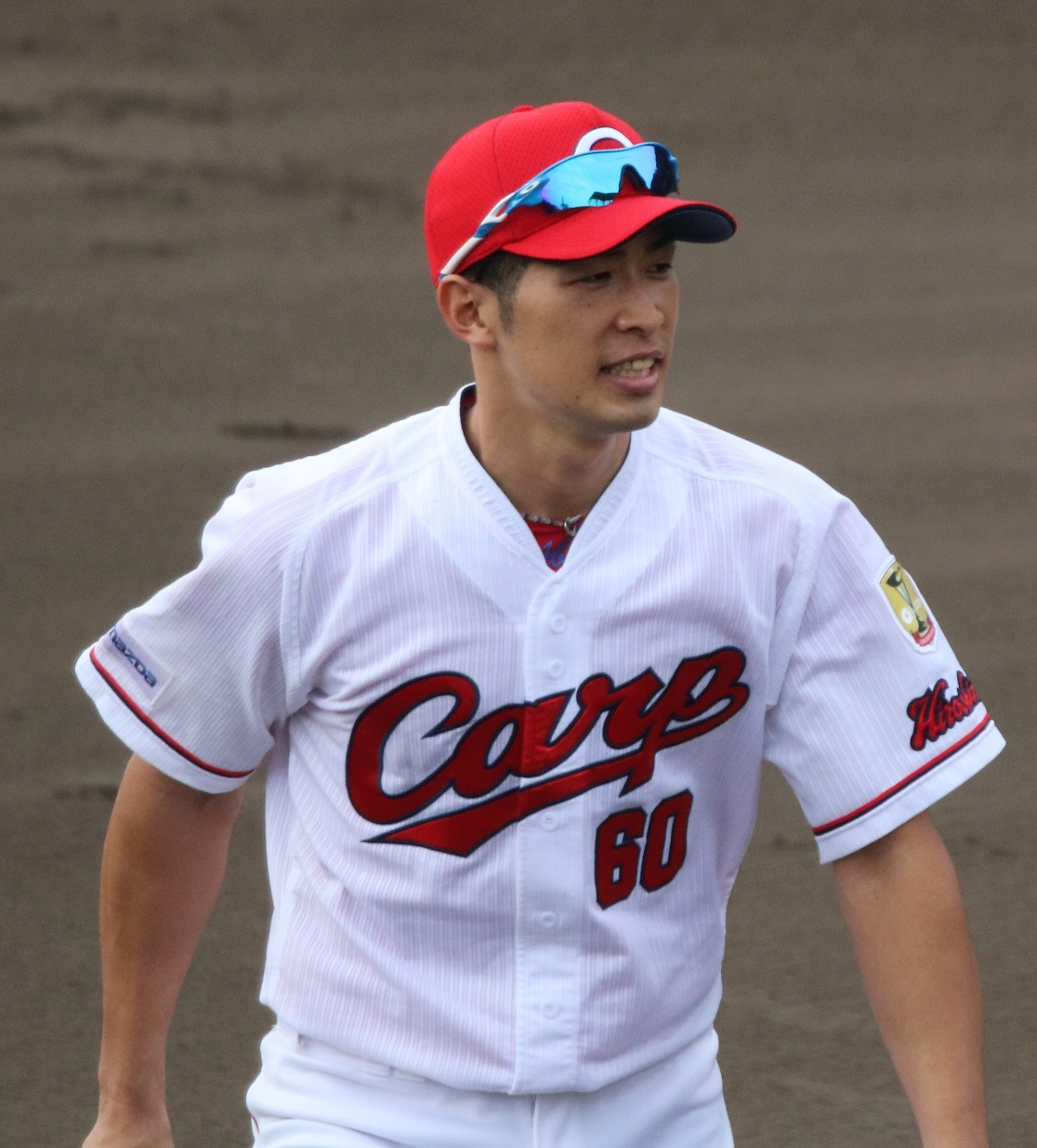
- Abe with the Hiroshima Toyo Carp
- Infielder
- Born: June 24, 1989 (age 36); Kitakyushu, Fukuoka, Japan
- Batted: Left Threw: Right

debut
- June 6, 2011, for the Hiroshima Toyo Carp

Last appearance
- October 9, 2021, for the Hiroshima Toyo Carp

NPB statistics (through 2021 season)
- Batting average: .264
- Home runs: 25
- RBI: 160
- Stats at Baseball Reference

Teams
- Hiroshima Toyo Carp (2008–2022)

Tomohiro Abe (安部 友裕, Abe Tomohiro; born June 24, 1989 in Kitakyushu, Fukuoka, Japan) is a professional Japanese baseball player. He plays infielder for the Hiroshima Toyo Carp.
