= Kosuke Tanaka =

Japanese baseball player (born 1989)

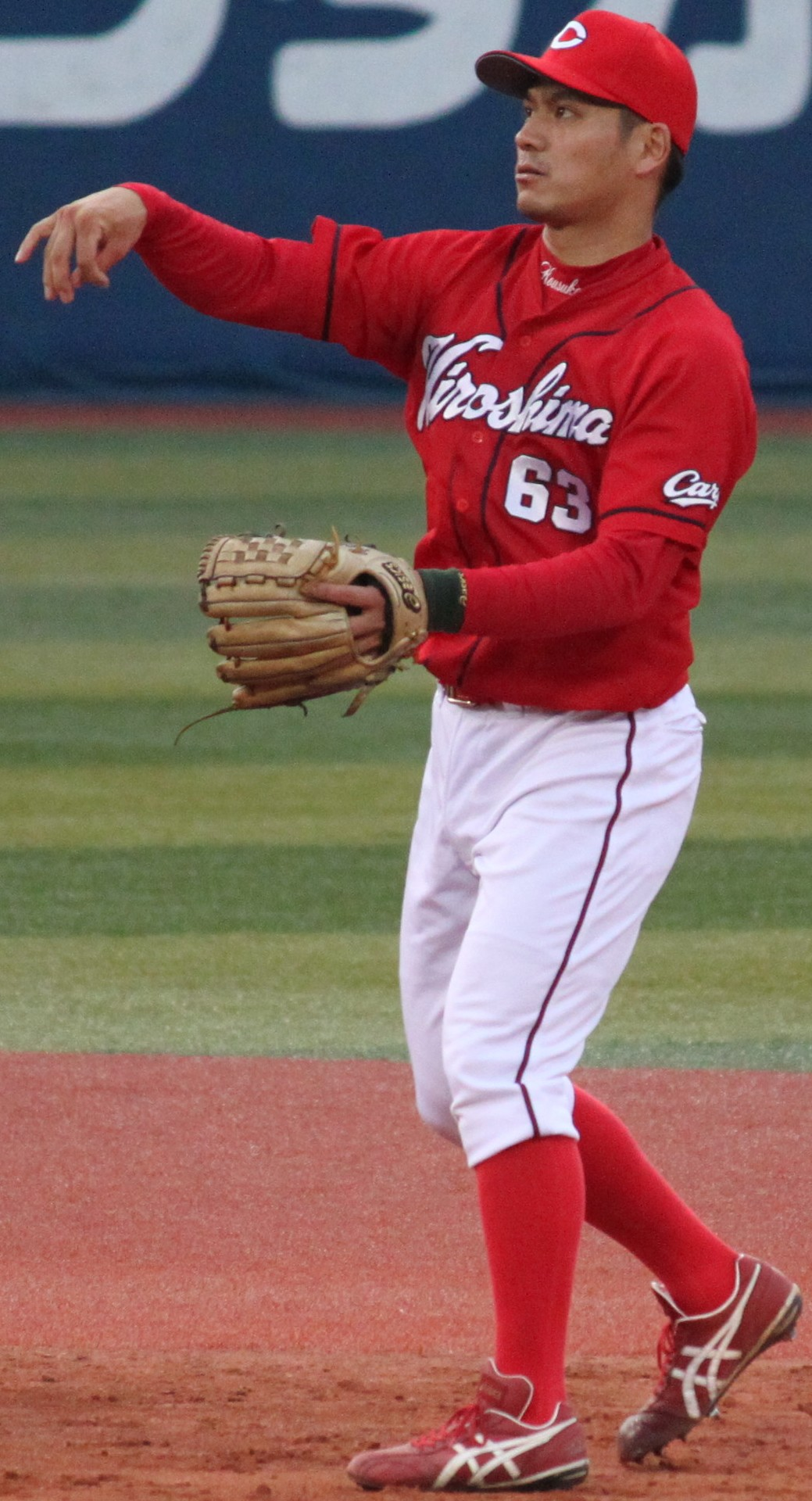
- Tanaka with the Hiroshima Toyo Carp
- Infielder
- Born: July 3, 1989 (age 37); Atsugi, Kanagawa, Japan
- Batted: Left Threw: Right

NPB debut
- March 29, 2014, for the Hiroshima Toyo Carp

Last NPB appearance
- October 4, 2025, for the Hiroshima Toyo Carp

NPB statistics
- Batting average: .256
- Hits: 965
- Home runs: 69
- Runs batted in: 348
- Stolen bases: 131
- Stats at Baseball Reference

Teams
- Hiroshima Toyo Carp (2014–2025)

Career highlights and awards
- 2016 CLCS MVP; Central League Golden Glove Award (2018); Central League Best Nine Award (2017); Central League stolen base champion (2017); 3× NPB All-Star (2015, 2017, 2018)

Kosuke Tanaka (田中 広輔, Tanaka Kōsuke; born July 3, 1989) is a professional Japanese baseball player. He plays infielder for the Hiroshima Toyo Carp.

== Career ==
Tanaka was the most valuable player of the 2016 Central League Climax Series.

He was selected 2018 NPB All-Star game. On October 10, 2018, he was selected Japan national baseball team at the 2018 MLB Japan All-Star Series.
