= Yusuke Nomura =

Japanese baseball player (born 1989)

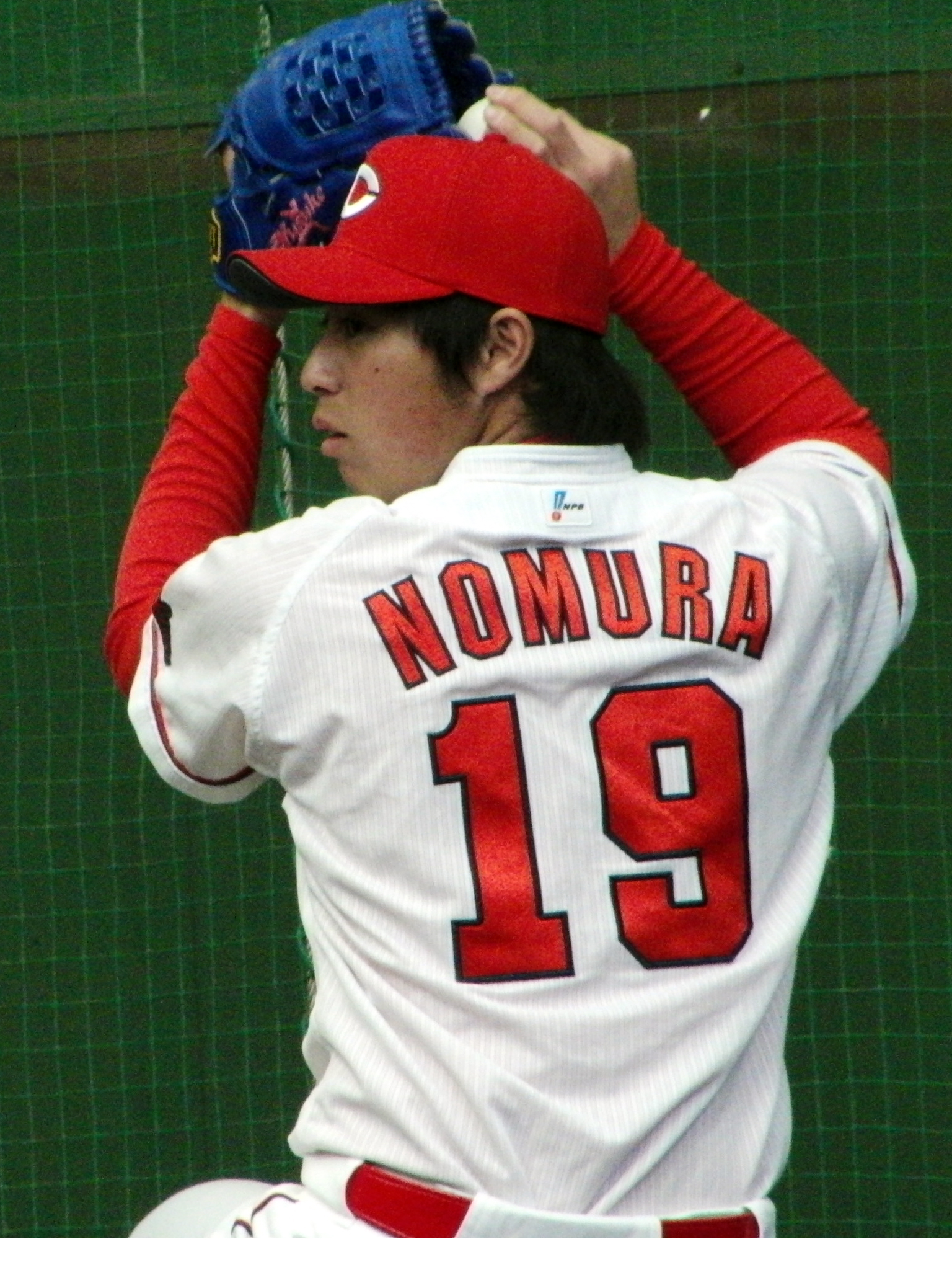
- Nomura with the Hiroshima Toyo Carp

Hiroshima Toyo Carp – No. 92
- Pitcher / Coach
- Born: June 24, 1989 (age 37); Kurashiki, Okayama, Japan
- Batted: Right Threw: Right

NPB debut
- April 1, 2012, for the Hiroshima Toyo Carp

Last NPB appearance
- October 5, 2024, for the Hiroshima Toyo Carp

NPB statistics
- Win–loss record: 80–64
- Earned run average: 3.53
- Strikeouts: 758
- Stats at Baseball Reference

Teams
- As player: Hiroshima Toyo Carp (2012–2024); As coach: Hiroshima Toyo Carp (2025-)

Career highlights and awards
- 2012 Central League Rookie of the Year; 1× NPB Win Champion (2016); 1× NPB Best Nine Award (2016); 2× NPB All-Star (2012, 2016)

Yusuke Nomura (野村 祐輔, Nomura Yusuke; born June 24, 1989) is a Japanese former professional baseball pitcher. He played in Nippon Professional Baseball (NPB) for the Hiroshima Toyo Carp.

== Playing career ==
Nomura played in 13 seasons in Nippon Professional Baseball, compiling an 80–64 record and 3.53 ERA with 758 strikeouts across 1,226 1/3 innings pitched. On September 27, 2024, Nomura announced that he would retire following the conclusion of the season.

== Coaching career ==
After his retirement as a player, Nomura remained with the team in a staff position, becoming the third team pitching coach.

== Personal life ==
In January 2025, Nomura announced that he had recently married a non-celebrity woman.
