= Shota Nakazaki =

Japanese baseball player (born 1992)

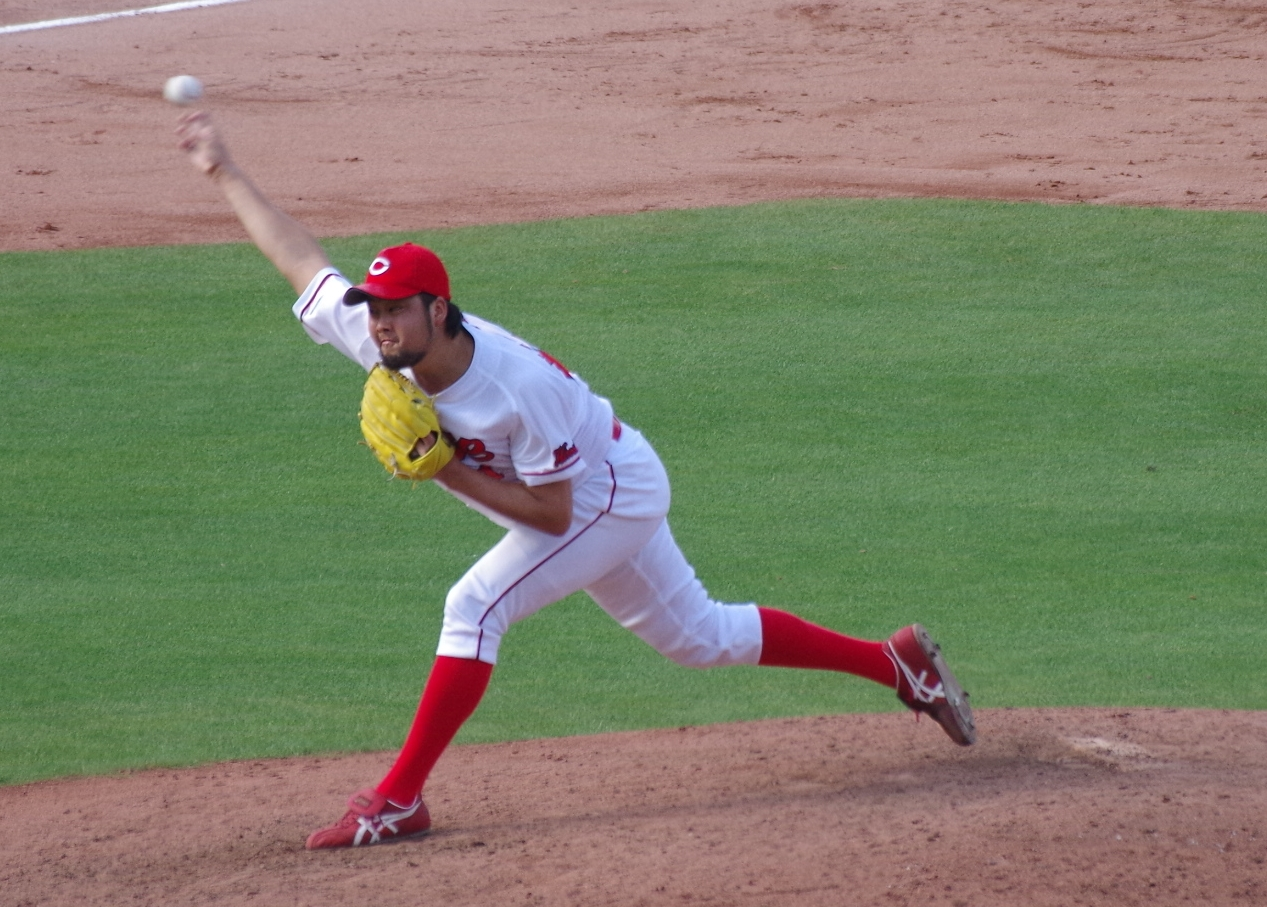

Hiroshima Toyo Carp – No. 21
- Pitcher
- Born: August 10, 1992 (age 33); Takarabe, Kagoshima, Japan
- Bats: Right Throws: Right

NPB debut
- March 30, 2012, for the Hiroshima Toyo Carp

NPB statistics (through 2025 season)
- Win–loss record: 26-35
- Earned run average: 3.13
- Strikeouts: 407
- Saves: 115
- Holds: 97
- Stats at Baseball Reference

Teams
- Hiroshima Toyo Carp (2011–present)

Career highlights and awards
- 2× NPB All-Star (2016, 2018)

Shota Nakazaki (中﨑 翔太, Nakazaki Shota; born August 10, 1992 in Takarabe, Kagoshima, Japan) is a professional Japanese baseball player. He plays pitcher for the Hiroshima Toyo Carp.

He was selected for the 2018 NPB All-Star game.

== Personal ==
His elder brother Yuta Nakazaki is a former professional baseball player. He played for Saitama Seibu Lions from 2008 to 2016.
