= Hiroaki Takaya =

Japanese baseball player (born 1981)

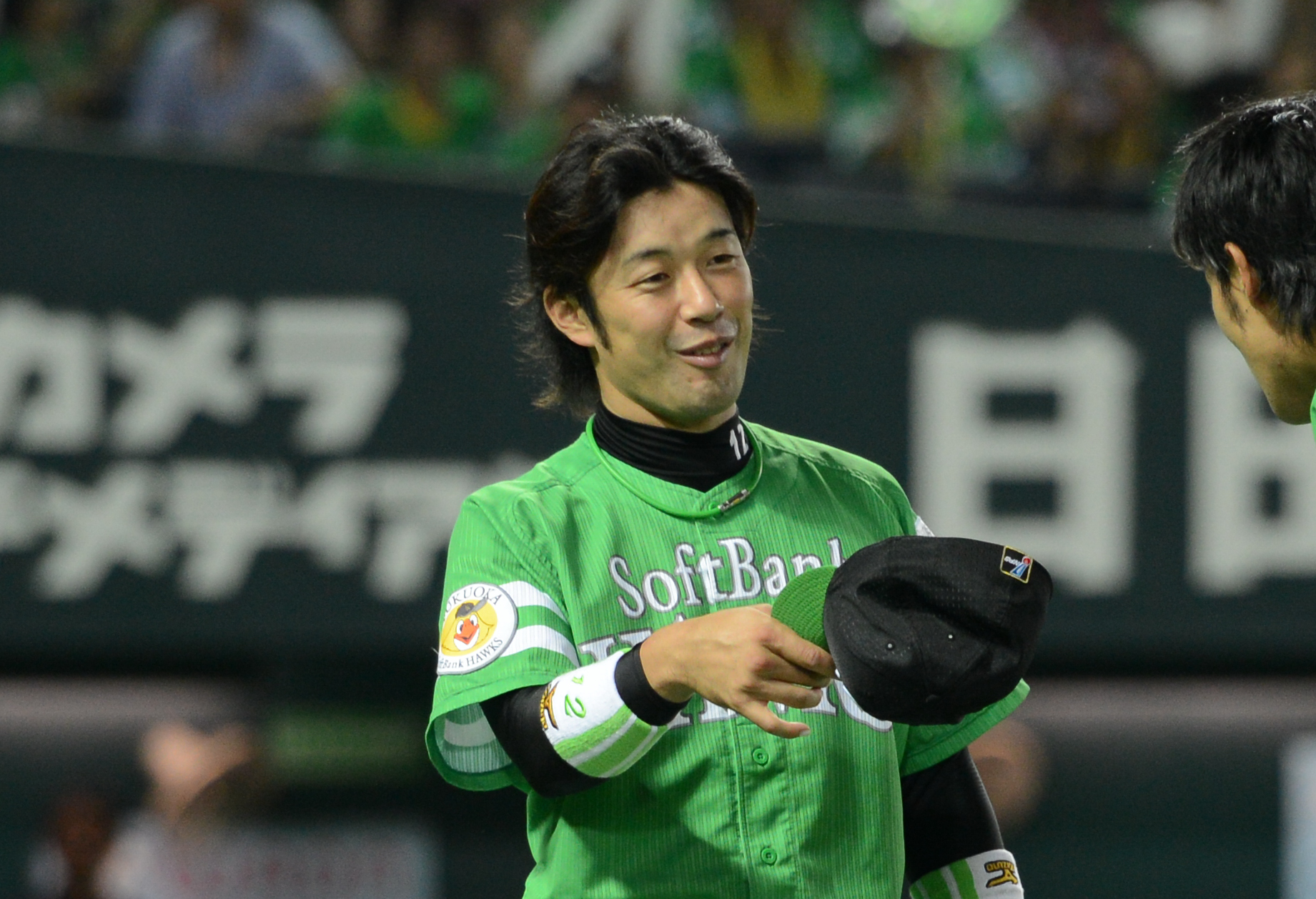
- Takaya with the Fukuoka SoftBank Hawks

Fukuoka SoftBank Hawks – No. 84
- Catcher / Coach
- Born: November 13, 1981 (age 44); Oyama, Tochigi, Japan
- Batted: Right Threw: Right

NPB debut
- April 17, 2007, for the Fukuoka SoftBank Hawks

Last NPB appearance
- October 25, 2021, for the Fukuoka SoftBank Hawks

NPB statistics
- Batting average: .194
- Home runs: 10
- RBI: 101
- Stats at Baseball Reference

Teams
- As player: Fukuoka SoftBank Hawks (2007–2021); As coach: Fukuoka SoftBank Hawks (2022–present)

Career highlights and awards
- As player: 6× Japan Series champion (2011, 2014, 2015, 2017, 2018, 2019); As coach: Japan Series champion (2025)

Hiroaki Takaya (高谷 裕亮, born November 13, 1981) is a Japanese former professional baseball catcher, and the current first squad battery coach for the Fukuoka SoftBank Hawks of Nippon Professional Baseball (NPB). He played in NPB for the Hawks from 2007 to 2021.

== Professional career ==
On November 21, 2006, Takaya was drafted by the Fukuoka SoftBank Hawks in the 2006 Nippon Professional Baseball draft.

=== 2007–2010 season ===
On April 17, 2007, he debuted in the Pacific League against the Tohoku Rakuten Golden Eagles. In 2007 season, he finished the regular season in 12 games with a Batting average of .130 and a RBI of 5.

In the 2008 season, he played as a starting member from July 8 in the second half of the season. On July 17, he recorded his first Home run and walk-off hit. And he finished the regular season in 62 games with a batting average of .180, 2 home runs and a RBI of 13.

On April 3, 2009, he played as a starting member in the opening game for the first time.

=== 2011–2015 season ===
In the 2011 season, Takaya was selected as the Japan Series roster in the 2011 Japan Series.

In the 2012 season, he finished the regular season in 64 games with a batting average of .211 and a RBI of 10.

In the 2014 season, he joined the First squad as a reserve catcher, but played only 20 games. But he was selected as the Japan Series roster in the 2014 Japan Series.

On May 31, 2015, Takaya recorded a home run for the first time in seven years. In 2015 season, he finished the regular season in 93 games with a batting average of .234, one home runs and a RBI of 16. And he played as a starting member in the 2015 Japan Series.

=== 2016–2021 season ===
On July 6, 2016, Takaya had surgery on the left knee meniscus. In the 2016 season, he played only in 37 games due to his left knee injury.

In the 2017 season, he mainly teamed up with mainstay and veteran starter pitchers such as Tsuyoshi Wada, Rick van den Hurk, Shota Takeda and Kenichi Nakata. On June 10, he broke his right middle finger but returned in July. he finished the regular season in 92 games with a batting average of .206, one home runs and a RBI of 20. In the 2017 Japan Series, he recorded a block of Stolen base twice in 1 inning, a Japan Series record alongside Toru Hosokawa, and contributed to the 2017 Japan Series champion.

On February 27, 2018, Takaya had surgery on the right elbow. He was diagnosed with 3 months of complete cure, but he returned on April 17. he finished the regular season in 73 games with a batting average of .173, one home runs and a RBI of 4. In the 2018 Japan Series, he recorded his first home run in the Japan series.

In the 2019 season, he started the bench mainly to support young catcher Takuya Kai and Relief pitchers, and contributed to the team as a relief catcher. And he also played as a relief catcher in the 2019 Japan Series.

In the 2020 season, Takaya mainly supported the pitcher as a relief catcher and finished the regular season with a batting average of .250, 2 home runs and 10 RBIs in 33 games. On October 13, he left the team for treatment given the condition of his left knee, which had been injured in the past.

In the 2021 season, he was forced to adjust from April to July due to last year's left knee surgery, which meant he played only 20 games. Takaya decided to retire after the 2021 season.

=== After retirement ===
After his retirement, Takaya has served as the second squad battery coach for the Fukuoka Softbank Hawks since the 2022 season.

On December 2, 2023, he was transferred to the first squad battery coach.

== Personal ==
Takaya has close friends with foreign players, and when they return to their home countries, he goes to the Fukuoka Airport to see them off.
