= 2015 Japan Series =

Team (Wins)	Managers	Season
Fukuoka SoftBank Hawks (4)	Kimiyasu Kudo	90–49–4, (.647), 12 GA
Tokyo Yakult Swallows (1)	Mitsuru Manaka	76–65–2, (.539), 1.5 GA
- Dates: October 24–29
- MVP: Lee Dae-ho (Fukuoka)
- FSA: Tetsuto Yamada (Tokyo)

Broadcast
- Television: TBS/RKB (Game 1); TV Tokyo/TVQ (Game 2); Fuji TV (Games 3–5)

The 2015 Japan Series was the 66th edition of Nippon Professional Baseball's postseason championship series. The Fukuoka SoftBank Hawks, champions of the Pacific League, played the Tokyo Yakult Swallows, champions of the Central League. The Hawks were the defending Japan Series champions, having beaten the Hanshin Tigers in 2014. The series was sponsored by the Sumitomo Mitsui Banking Corporation (SMBC) and was officially known as the SMBC Nippon Series 2015.

The Hawks defeated the Swallows in five games. Lee Dae-ho won the Japan Series Most Valuable Player Award. Kenji Akashi, Shota Takeda, and Rick van den Hurk (all of the Hawks) won outstanding player awards, while Tetsuto Yamada of the Swallows won the Fighting Spirit Award.

== Climax Series ==
First Stage
Central League
2	Yomiuri Giants	2
3	Hanshin Tigers	1
Pacific League
2	Hokkaido Nippon-Ham Fighters	1
3	Chiba Lotte Marines	2

Final Stage
1	Tokyo Yakult Swallows	4
2	Yomiuri Giants	1
1	Fukuoka SoftBank Hawks	4
3	Chiba Lotte Marines	0

Japan Series
CL1	Tokyo Yakult Swallows	1
PL1	Fukuoka SoftBank Hawks	4

== Summary ==
Fukuoka SoftBank Hawks won the series, 4–1.

Game	Date	Score	Location	Time	Attendance
1	October 24	Tokyo Yakult Swallows – 2, Fukuoka SoftBank Hawks – 4	Fukuoka Dome	3:04	35,732
2	October 25	Tokyo Yakult Swallows – 0, Fukuoka SoftBank Hawks – 4	Fukuoka Dome	3:35	35,764
3	October 27	Fukuoka SoftBank Hawks – 4, Tokyo Yakult Swallows – 8	Meiji Jingu Stadium	3:38	31,037
4	October 28	Fukuoka SoftBank Hawks – 6, Tokyo Yakult Swallows – 4	Meiji Jingu Stadium	4:06	31,288
5	October 29	Fukuoka SoftBank Hawks – 5, Tokyo Yakult Swallows – 0	Meiji Jingu Stadium	3:36	31,239

== Series notes ==
This was the fourth time in Japan Series history that two rookie managers met, with Mitsuru Manaka managing Yakult and Kimiyasu Kudoh managing SoftBank. The other occurrences were in 1986 (Masaaki Mori for the Seibu Lions and Junro Anan for the Hiroshima Carp), 2002 (Tatsunori Hara for the Yomiuri Giants and Haruki Ihara for Seibu) and 2004 (Tsutomu Ito for Seibu and Hiromitsu Ochiai for the Chunichi Dragons). In addition, Manaka is the first rookie manager of a Central League team to qualify for the Japan Series through the Climax Series playoff system. (Note: SoftBank's Kudoh is the 5th rookie manager to win the Pacific League Climax Series. Tsutomu Ito (2004) and Hisanobu Watanabe (2008) of the Seibu Lions, Norifumi Nishimura of the Chiba Lotte Marines (2010) and Hideki Kuriyama of the Hokkaido Nippon Ham Fighters (2012) have all been successful rookie managers since the Pacific League introduced a post-season playoff series in 2004. The Central League introduced a playoff series in 2007, which is when the name "Climax Series" was adopted.)

Yakult won the Central League pennant and defeated the Yomiuri Giants in the Central League Climax Series, making this their first Japan Series appearance since 2001, when they defeated the Osaka Kintetsu Buffaloes four games to one. The defending champion Hawks won the Pacific League pennant and defeated the Chiba Lotte Marines in the Pacific League Climax Series.

== Game summaries ==
=== Game 1 ===
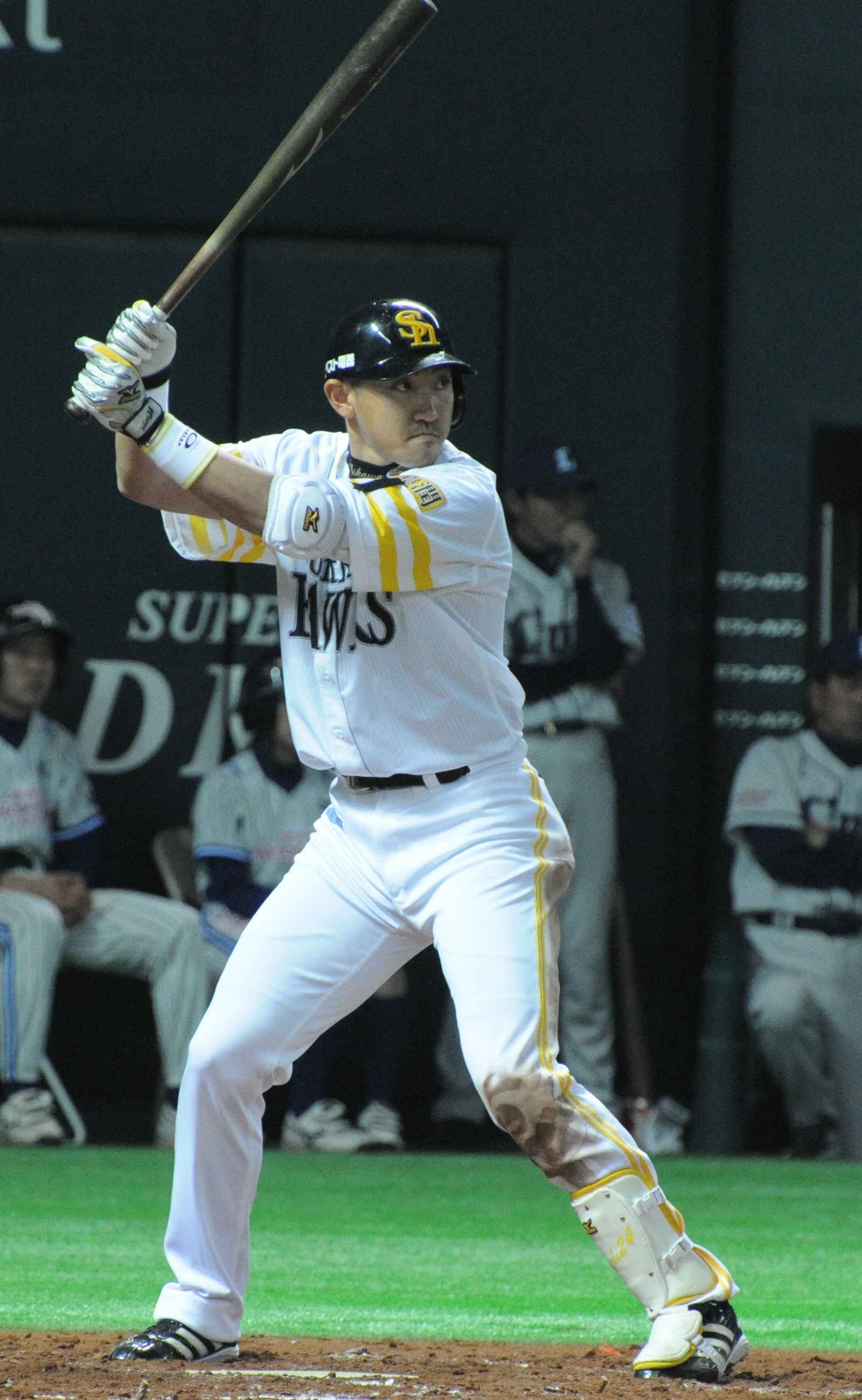
The Hawks played the series without Seiichi Uchikawa, who suffered broken ribs in the Climax Series.

Saturday, October 24, 2015, 6:30 pm (JST) at Fukuoka Yahuoku! Dome in Fukuoka, Fukuoka Prefecture
Team	1	2	3	4	5	6	7	8	9	R	H	E
Yakult	0	0	0	0	0	0	0	0	2	2	4	0
SoftBank	0	0	0	3	0	1	0	0	X	4	15	1
WP: Shota Takeda (1–0) LP: Masanori Ishikawa (0–1); Home runs: YAK: Kazuhiro Hatakeyama (1); SBH: Nobuhiro Matsuda (1); Attendance: 35,732

Before the start of the game, Seiichi Uchikawa, the Hawks' cleanup hitter, was ruled out for the Japan Series due to broken ribs suffered during the Climax Series victory.

Shota Takeda, the starting pitcher for the Hawks, pitched a complete game victory against the Swallows. Nobuhiro Matsuda, the Hawks' captain, scored the game's first run with a home run in the fourth inning. Swallows' starting pitcher Masanori Ishikawa allowed three earned runs.

=== Game 2 ===
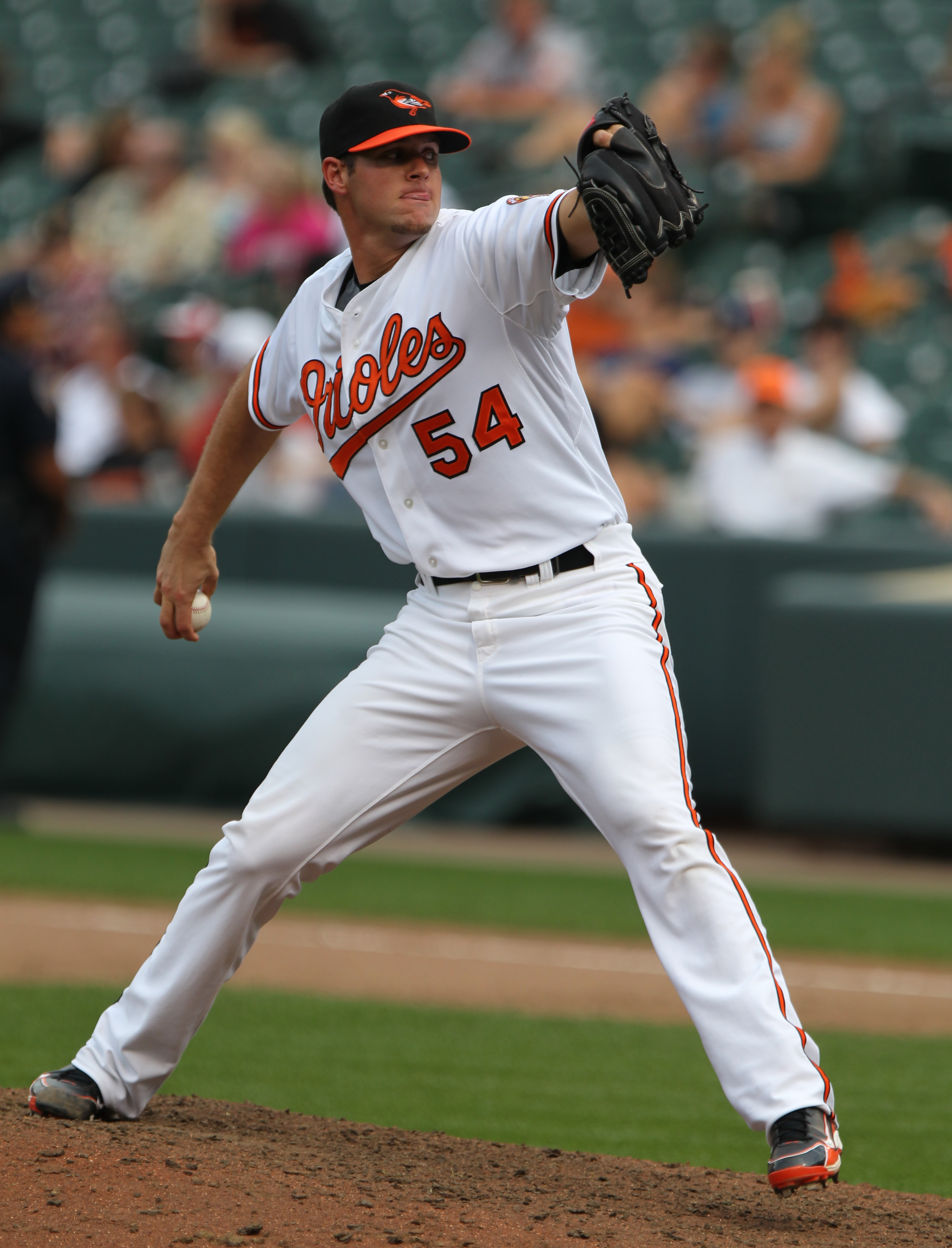
Rick van den Hurk pitched eight shutout innings against the Swallows in Game 2.

Sunday, October 25, 2015, 6:30 pm (JST) at Fukuoka Yahuoku! Dome in Fukuoka, Fukuoka Prefecture
Team	1	2	3	4	5	6	7	8	9	R	H	E
Yakult	0	0	0	0	0	0	0	0	0	0	3	0
SoftBank	0	0	0	2	0	2	0	0	X	4	8	0
WP: Rick van den Hurk (1–0) LP: Yasuhiro Ogawa (0–1); Home runs: YAK: None; SBH: Lee Dae-ho (1), Akira Nakamura (1); Attendance: 35,764

The Hawks shut out the Swallows, with Hawks starting pitcher Rick van den Hurk pitching eight innings, allowing only three hits while striking out seven and issuing no walks. Closer Dennis Sarfate pitched the ninth inning for the Hawks. On offense, Lee Dae-ho and Akira Nakamura hit home runs for the Hawks.

=== Game 3 ===
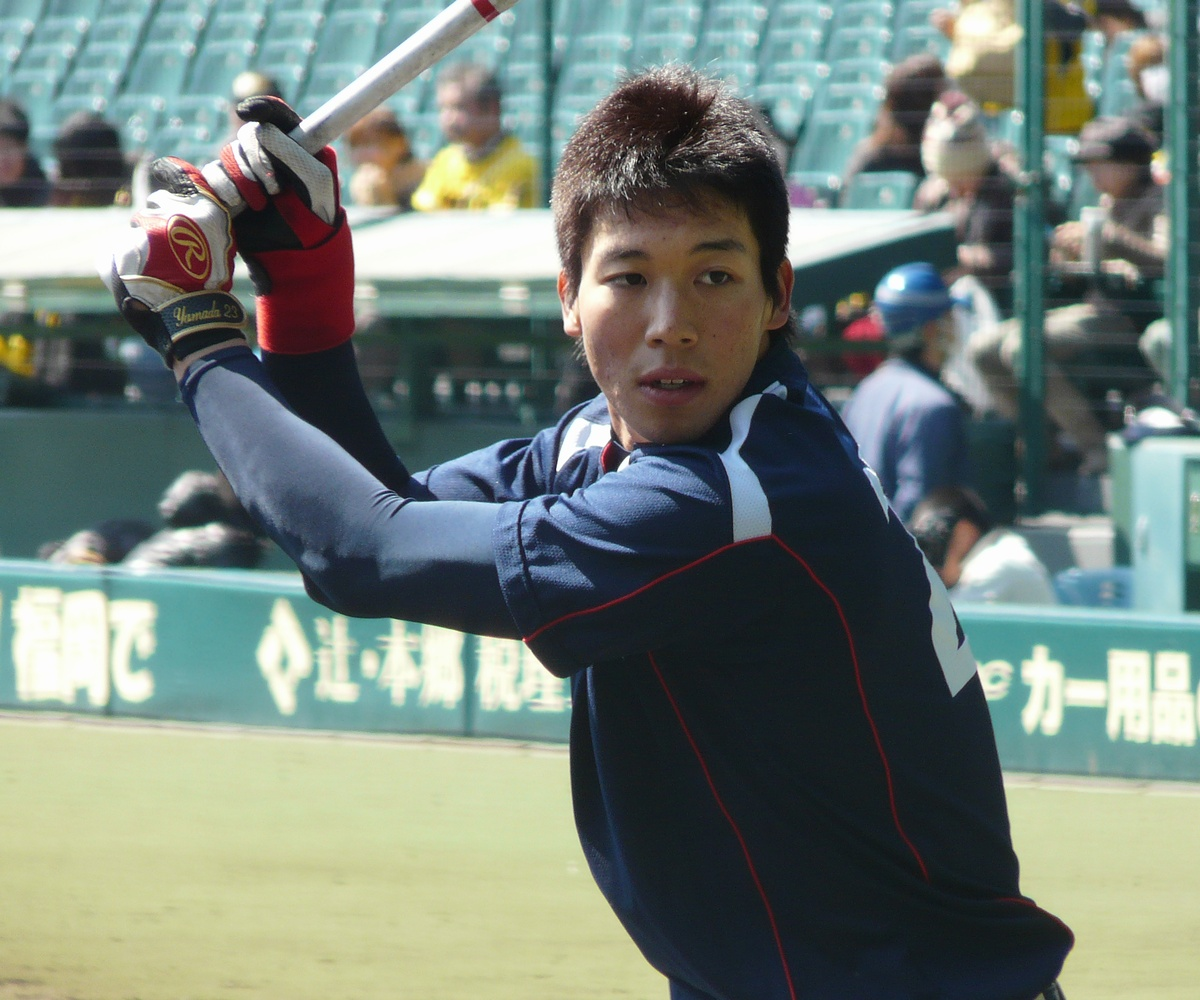
Tetsuto Yamada became the first player to hit three home runs in a Japan Series game.

Tuesday, October 27, 2015, 6:15 pm (JST) at Meiji Jingu Stadium in Shinjuku, Tokyo
Team	1	2	3	4	5	6	7	8	9	R	H	E
SoftBank	0	2	0	1	1	0	0	0	0	4	8	0
Yakult	2	0	1	0	2	0	0	3	X	8	8	0
WP: Orlando Román (1–0) LP: Kodai Senga (0–1); Home runs: SBH: Kenta Imamiya (1), Kenji Akashi (1); YAK: Tetsuto Yamada 3 (3), Kazuhiro Hatakeyama (2); Attendance: 31,037

Tetsuto Yamada hit three home runs in three consecutive plate appearances during Game 3 for the Swallows, becoming the first player to hit three home runs in a Japan Series game. Shigeo Nagashima hit home runs in three consecutive plate appearances spread across two games during the 1970 Japan Series. Kazuhiro Hatakeyama also hit a home run for Yakult, while Kenji Akashi and Kenta Imamiya hit home runs for the Hawks.

=== Game 4 ===
Wednesday, October 28, 2015, 6:15 pm (JST) at Meiji Jingu Stadium in Shinjuku, Tokyo
Team	1	2	3	4	5	6	7	8	9	R	H	E
SoftBank	1	0	4	0	0	1	0	0	0	6	6	1
Yakult	0	0	0	1	0	3	0	0	0	4	8	1
WP: Tadashi Settsu (1–0) LP: Shohei Tateyama (0–1) Sv: Dennis Sarfate (1); Home runs: SBH: Toru Hosokawa (1); YAK: None; Attendance: 31,288

Dae-ho, who assumed the cleanup hitter role from Uchikawa, batted 3-for-4 and recorded four runs batted in during Game 4. He had an RBI single in the first inning, and hit a double that scored three runs in the third inning. Toru Hosokawa recorded an RBI double in the third inning and hit a home run in the sixth inning. Wladimir Balentien scored the Swallows' first run on a fielder's choice in the fourth inning, and the Swallows scored three more runs in the sixth inning. Though he allowed four runs in five innings and left the game with the bases loaded and no outs in the sixth inning, Tadashi Settsu was the winning pitcher. Shohei Tateyama took the loss in the game for the Swallows, as he walked too many Hawks' batters. Sarfate ended a potential ninth inning rally by Yakult to record the save.

=== Game 5 ===
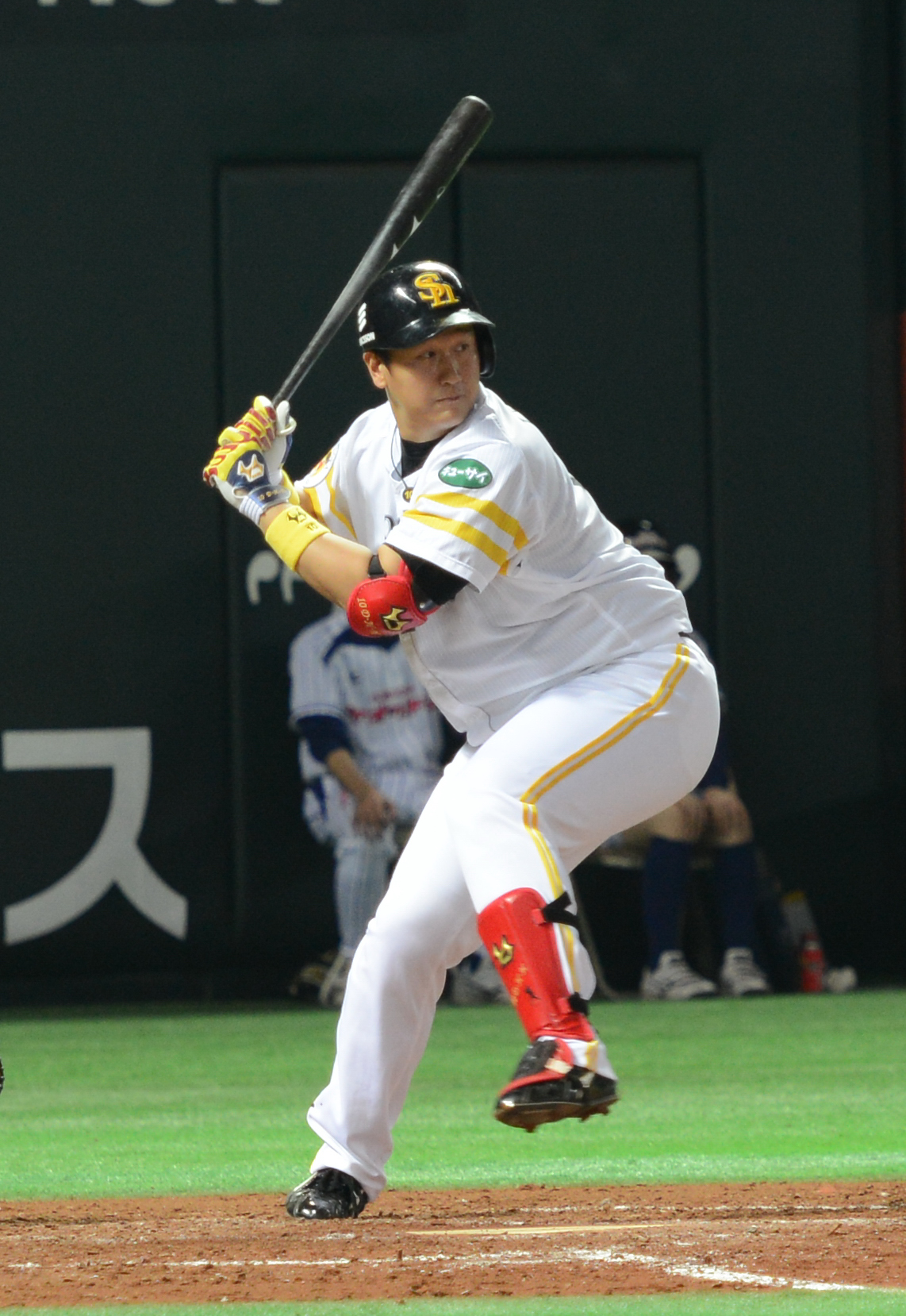
Lee Dae-ho, the Series MVP

Thursday, October 29, 2015, 6:15 pm (JST) at Meiji Jingu Stadium in Shinjuku, Tokyo
Team	1	2	3	4	5	6	7	8	9	R	H	E
SoftBank	0	0	0	2	2	0	0	0	1	5	10	0
Yakult	0	0	0	0	0	0	0	0	0	0	5	1
WP: Jason Standridge (1–0) LP: Masanori Ishikawa (0–2); Home runs: SBH: Lee Dae-ho (2); YAK: None; Attendance: 31,239

Dae-ho hit a two-run home run in the fourth inning for the Hawks' first runs of the game. They scored two more runs in the fourth inning and one run in the ninth inning. Meanwhile, the Hawks pitchers, led by starting pitcher Jason Standridge, who pitched six innings, recorded another shutout of the Swallows to win the series in five games.

Dae-ho, who batted 8-for-16 (.500) with two home runs and eight RBIs in the five game series was named the Japan Series Most Valuable Player (MVP). He became the first Korean player to win the Japan Series MVP Award, and the first foreign player since Troy Neel in the 1996 Japan Series. Kenji Akashi, Shota Takeda, and Rick van den Hurk of the Hawks won outstanding player awards. The Fighting Spirit Award, given to the best player on the losing team of the series, went to Tetsuto Yamada of the Swallows.

Masayoshi Son, the owner of the Hawks who also owns the Sprint Corporation, based in Kansas City, Missouri, joked that he would like the Hawks to play against the Kansas City Royals of Major League Baseball, if they won the 2015 World Series, to determine a true champion of baseball. Interestingly, the Royals did win the World Series by the same count of four games to one over the New York Mets. However, no series happened between SoftBank and the Royals.

== See also ==
- 2015 Korean Series
- 2015 World Series
