= Kenji Akashi =

Japanese baseball player (born 1986)

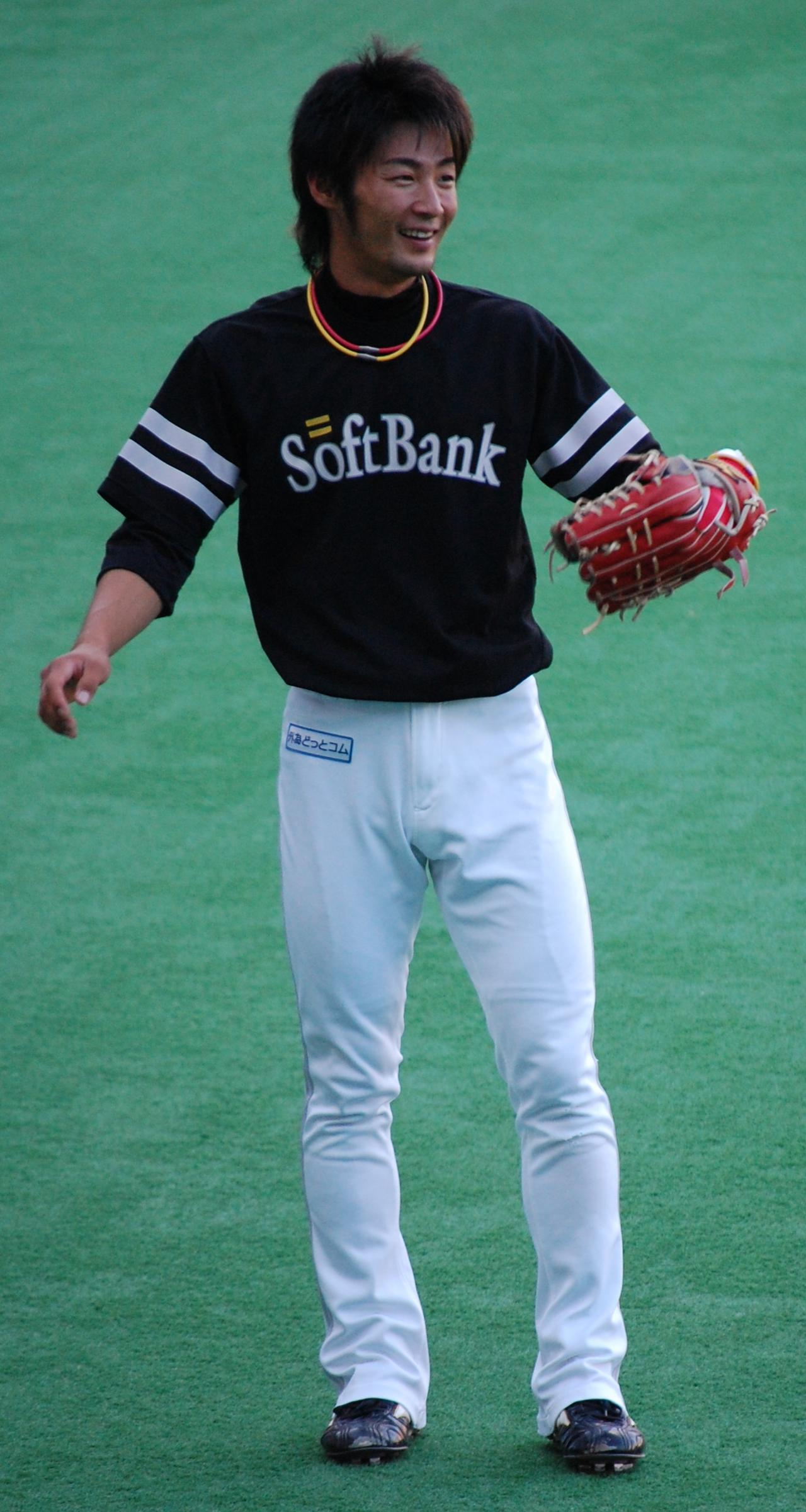
- Akashi with the Fukuoka SoftBank Hawks

Fukuoka SoftBank Hawks – No. 026
- Infielder / Coach
- Born: January 9, 1986 (age 40); Hokkaido, Japan
- Batted: Left Threw: Right

NPB debut
- May 2, 2004, for the Fukuoka Daiei Hawks

Last NPB appearance
- September 24, 2022, for the Fukuoka SoftBank Hawks

NPB statistics
- Batting average: .252
- Home runs: 17
- Runs batted in: 213
- Hits: 648
- Stolen bases: 93
- Stats at Baseball Reference

Teams
- As player: Fukuoka Daiei Hawks/Fukuoka SoftBank Hawks (2004–2022); As coach: Fukuoka SoftBank Hawks (2023–present)

Career highlights and awards
- NPB All-Star (2012); MAZDA All-Star Game 2012 Fighting Player Award (2012); 7× Japan Series Champion (2011, 2014–2015, 2017–2020); Japan Series Outstanding Player Award (2015)

Kenji Akashi (明石 健志, Akashi Kenji; born January 9, 1986) is a Japanese former professional baseball infielder, and current second squad hitting coach for the Fukuoka SoftBank Hawks of Nippon Professional Baseball (NPB). He played his entire 19-year NPB career with Fukuoka.

He was an active player for the Fukuoka Daiei/SoftBank Hawks until 2022 season. He was the last active position player for the Hawks who played during the Daiei era at the time of his retirement.

== Professional career ==
On November 19, 2003, Akashi was drafted by the Fukuoka Daiei Hawks in the 2003 Nippon Professional Baseball draft.

=== 2004–2010 season ===
On May 2, 2004, Akashi debuted in the Pacific League against the Osaka Kintetsu Buffaloes, and he recorded his first hit. In 2004 season, he played 7 games in the Pacific League.

In 2005 - 2006 season, Akashi was unable to compete in the Pacific League due to an injury in 2004 and surgery on his right shoulder in 2005.

In 2007 season, he played 15 games in the Pacific League.

In 2008 season, Akashi was playing as a shortstop Starter in place of Munenori Kawasaki, who participated in the Japan national baseball team at the Beijing Olympics, but on August 27, he received a hit by pitch in and broke his right hand. As a result, he left the team and participated in the Pacific League in only 29 games.

On August 26, 2009, Akashi recorded his first home run. In 2009 season, he finished the regular season in 48 games with a batting average of .291, a one home runs, a RBI of 9, and a 6 stolen bases.

In 2010 season, Akashi played 39 games in the Pacific League. He injured his right leg in a practice match for autumn training and underwent surgery.

=== 2011–2015 season ===
In 2011 season, Akashi's return to the team was delayed in June due to the effects of surgical ankle rehabilitation. Akashi finished the regular season in 58 games with a batting average of .278, a one home runs, a RBI of 15, and a 5 stolen bases. And he was selected as the Japan Series roster in the 2011 Japan Series, played in Game 3 with a pinch runner.

On July 7, 2012, Akashi made an Equal NPB Record by choosing walk with 19 pitches per turn at bat. He was elected to the MAZDA All-Star Game 2012 and recorded a hit. He also won the Fighting Player Award for his good defense. In 2012 season, Akashi finished the regular season in 135 games with a batting average of .254, a one home runs, a RBI of 27, and a 25 stolen bases.

In 2013 season, Akashi has played only 33 games in the Pacific League due to an injury to his right knee.

In 2014 season, Akashi finished the regular season in 93 games with a batting average of .252, a one home runs, a RBI of 21, and a 17 stolen bases. In the 2014 Japan Series against the Hanshin Tigers, he recorded his first hit in the Japan Series in Game 3.

On April 29, 2015, Akashi hit his first reversal Grand Slam against the Hokkaido Nippon-Ham Fighters. In 2015 season, Akashi finished the regular season in 115 games with a batting average of .263, a 3 home runs, a RBI of 30, and a 11 stolen bases. In the 2015 Japan Series against the Tokyo Yakult Swallows, Akashi He won the Japan Series Outstanding Player Award with a batting average of .438 (7 hits in 16 at bats), 1 home run, 7 4 dead balls, and an OBP of .609.

=== 2016–2020 season ===
On March 28, 2016, Akashi left the team for treatment without recovering his right shoulder, which he had injured in spring training. He returned to the team on July 29, but his participation in the Pacific League for the 2016 season dropped to 47 games.

In 2017 season, Akashi changed his uniform number from 36 to 8. Akashi finished the regular season in 103 games with a batting average of .279, a one home runs, a RBI of 23, and a 5 stolen bases. In the 2017 Japan Series against the Yokohama DeNA BayStars, he contributed to the team's Japan Series champion by hitting a double in Game 2 that led to a come-from-behind victory.

On February 27, 2018, Akashi was hospitalized with acute low back pain. In 2018 season, he played only 45 games due to back pain, but his batting average was .282, up from the previous year. In the 2018 Japan Series against the Hiroshima Toyo Carp, Akashi hit a home run in Game 5 and contributed to the team's second consecutive Japan Series champion.

On February 21, 2019, Akashi underwent total spinal endoscopic herniation surgery. On April 24, he returned to the team. On April 25, Akashi hit his first Walk-off home run against the Orix Buffaloes, and he did somersaults at home base. In 2019 season, Akashi finished the regular season in 99 games with a batting average of .248, a 5 home runs, a RBI of 21, and a 6 stolen bases. In the 2019 Japan Series against the Yomiuri Giants, Akashi He participated in defensive and pinch runners and contributed to the team's third consecutive Japan Series champion.

In the match against Saitama Seibu Lions on October 31, Akashi recorded 4 hits per game for the first time in 3 years. In 2020 season, Akashi finished the regular season in 63 games with a batting average of .253, a 2 home runs, and a RBI of 17, and a 4 stolen bases. In the 2020 Japan Series against the Yomiuri Giants, He participated in game 2.

=== 2021–2022 season ===
In 2021 season, Akashi finished the regular season in 57 games with a batting average of .202, and a RBI of 7, and a one stolen bases.

On June 24 2022, Akashi recorded 1000 games appearances against the Hokkaido Nippon-Ham Fighters. On September 23, he announced his retirement after the 2022 season.

=== After retirement ===
On October 31 2022, The Fukuoka SoftBank Hawks have announced that he will be their coach from the 2023 season.
