= Kenichi Nakata =

Japanese baseball player (born 1982)

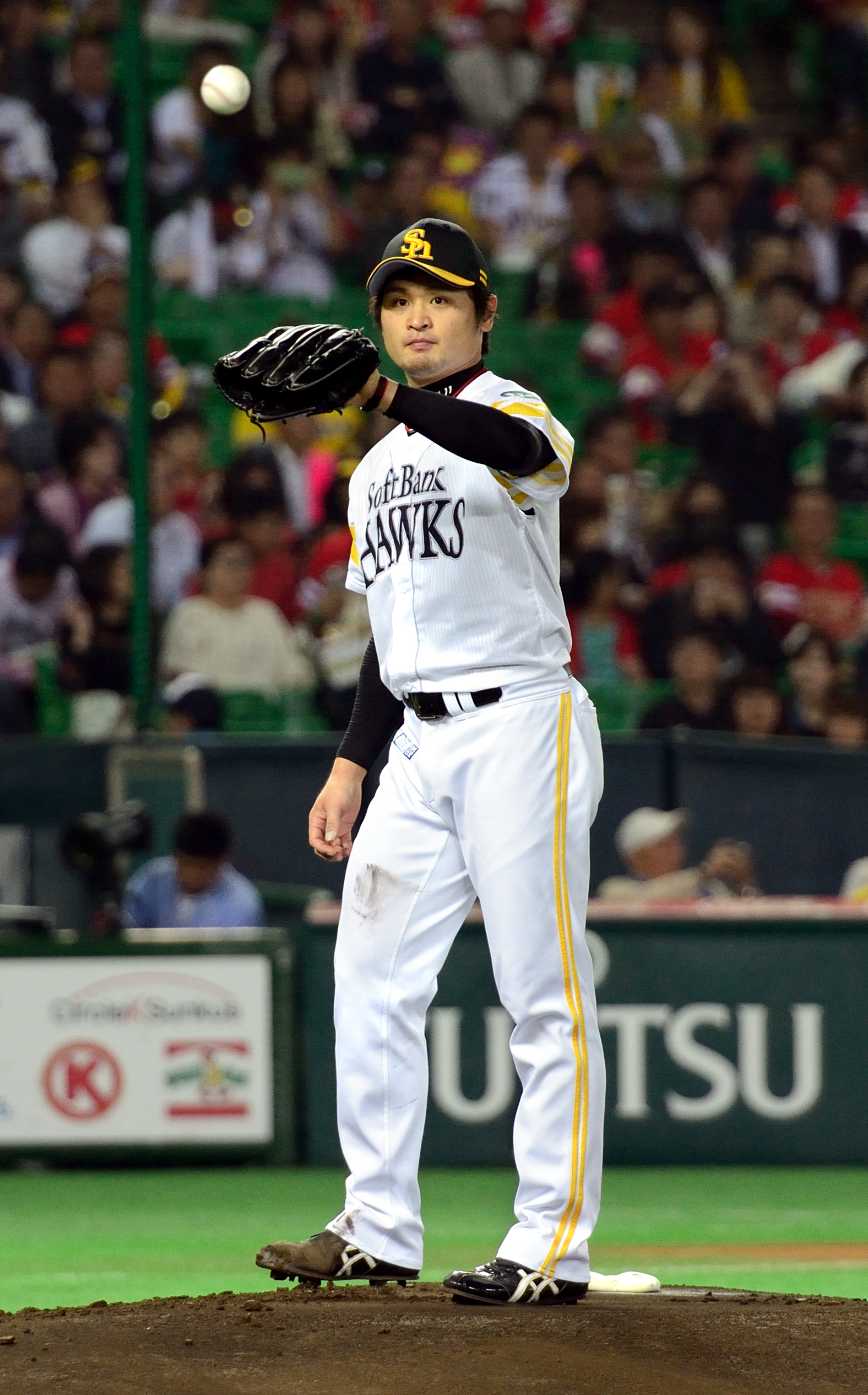
- Nakata with the Fukuoka SoftBank Hawks

Fukuoka SoftBank Hawks – No. 71
- Pitcher / Coach
- Born: November 5, 1982 (age 43)
- Batted: Right Threw: Right

NPB debut
- April 3, 2005, for the Chunichi Dragons

Last NPB appearance
- September 19, 2020, for the Hanshin Tigers

NPB statistics
- Win–loss record: 100–79
- Earned run average: 3.75
- Strikeouts: 1,350
- Stats at Baseball Reference

Teams
- As player: Chunichi Dragons (2005–2013); Fukuoka SoftBank Hawks (2014–2019); Hanshin Tigers (2020–2021); As coach: Fukuoka SoftBank Hawks (2022–present)

Career highlights and awards
- As player: NPB All-Star (2007); 5× Japan Series champion (2007, 2014, 2015, 2017, 2018); As coach: Japan Series champion (2025)

Kenichi Nakata (中田 賢一, born November 5, 1982) is a Japanese former professional baseball pitcher, and current first squad pitching coach for the Fukuoka SoftBank Hawks of Nippon Professional Baseball (NPB). He played in NPB for the Chunichi Dragons, the Hawks, and the Hanshin Tigers.

== Early baseball career ==
Nakata was selected as the Japan national baseball team for the 33rd USA VS Japan Collegiate All-Star Series attending University of Kitakyushu.

== Professional career ==
=== Chunichi Dragons ===
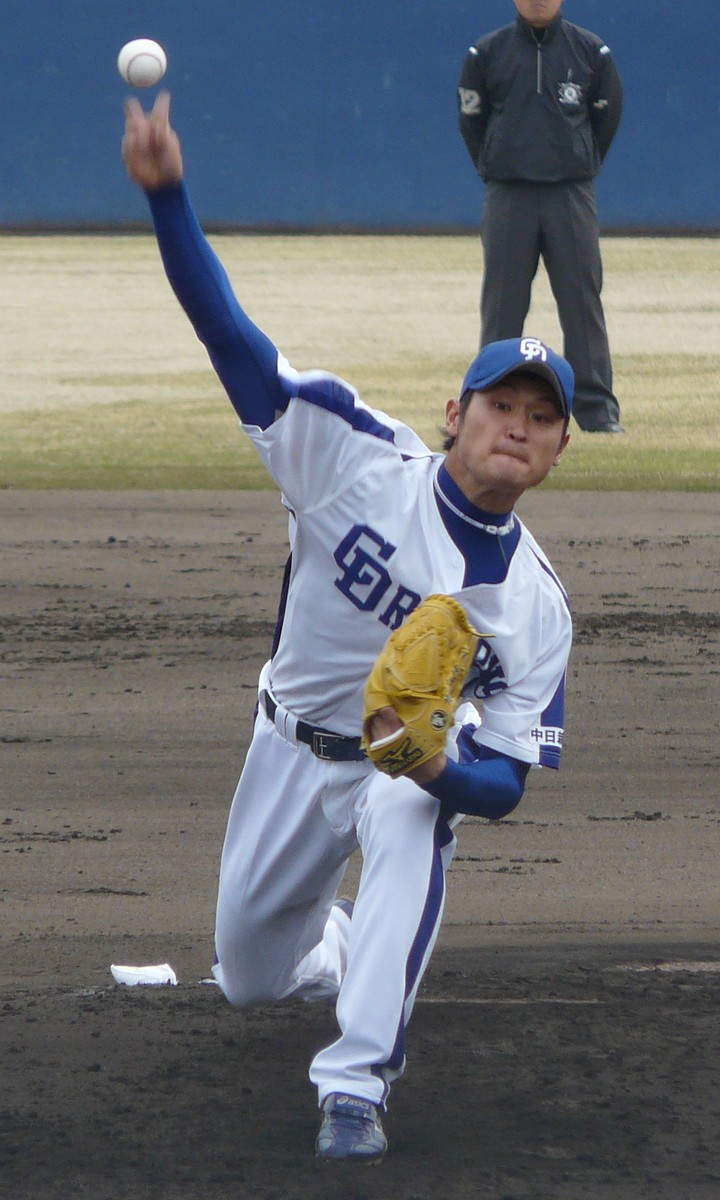
Nakata with the Chunichi Dragons

On November 17, 2004, Nakata was drafted by the Chunichi Dragons in the 2004 Nippon Professional Baseball draft.

In 2007 season, he selected 2007 NPB All-Star game. He pitched in the 2007 Japan Series and became the winning pitcher.

In 2010 season, he finished the regular season with a 7–4 Win–loss record, a 2.90 ERA, 105 strikeouts in 118 innings. He pitched in the 2010 Japan Series.

From 2005 season to 2013 season, he recorded a 61-51 Win–loss record, 16 Holds, and 1 saves in the Chunichi Dragons.

=== Fukuoka SoftBank Hawks ===
On November 28, 2013, Nakata agreed to a four-year contract for 70 million yen and Incentive with the Fukuoka SoftBank Hawks.

In 2014 season, he finished the regular season with a 11–7 Win–loss record, a 4.34 ERA, 116 strikeouts in 139 innings. He pitched in the 2014 Japan Series.

In 2015 season, he finished the regular season with a 9–7 Win–loss record, a 3.24 ERA, 130 strikeouts in 155 1/3 innings. He pitched in the 2015 Japan Series.

On August 26, 2018, he records his 100 wins as a relief pitcher.

=== Hanshin Tigers ===
On October 26, 2019, he joined the Hanshin Tigers.

On September 28, 2021, Nakata announced he would retire from professional baseball after 17 seasons in NPB.

=== After retirement ===
After his retirement, Nakata was appointed as the third squad pitching coach of the Fukuoka Softbank Hawks in the 2022 season.

He will serve as the fourth squad pitching coach beginning with the 2023 season.

On December 2, 2023, he was transferred to the first squad pitching coach.
