= Dennis Sarfate =

American baseball player (born 1981)

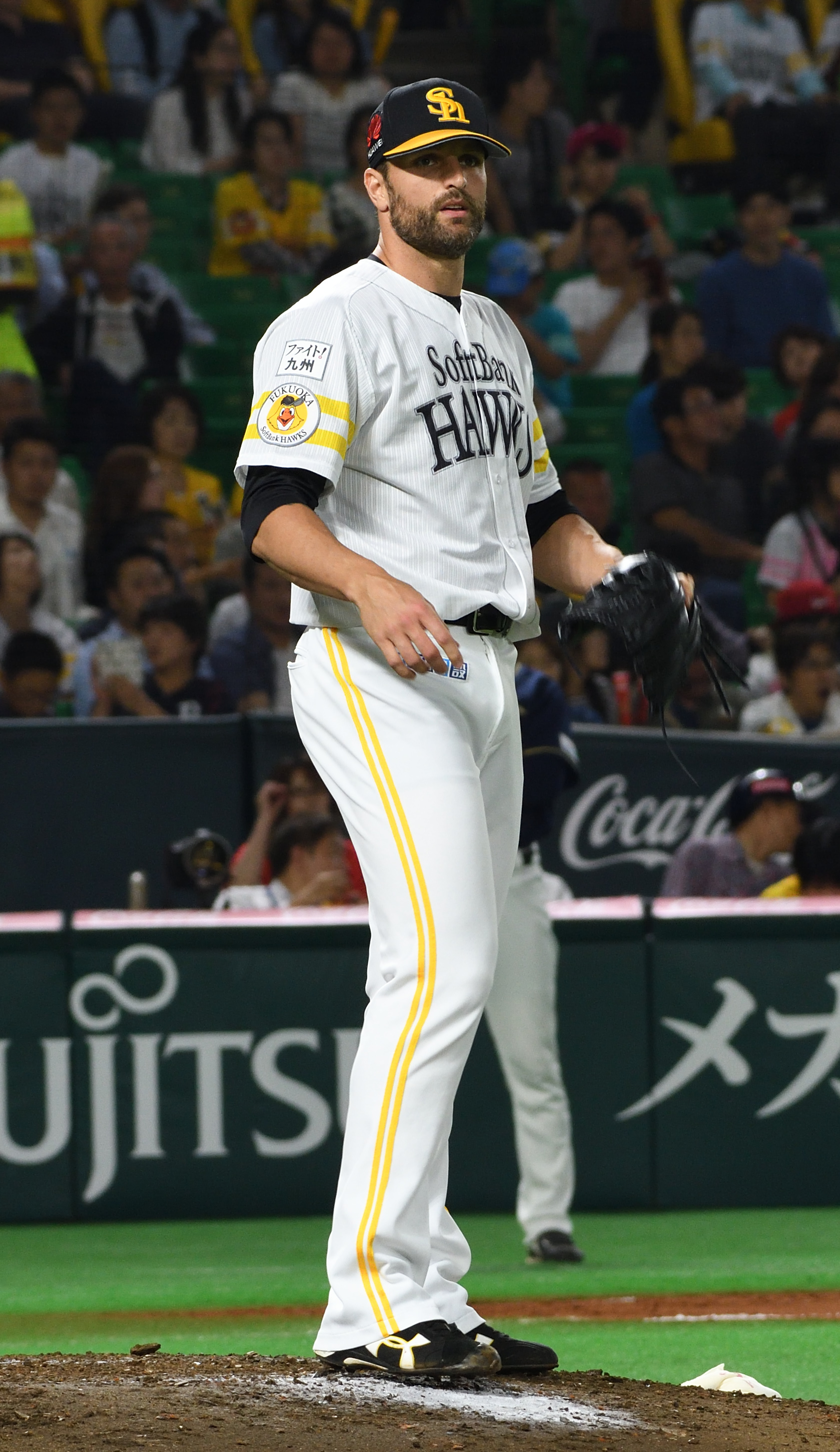
- Sarfate with the Fukuoka SoftBank Hawks
- Pitcher
- Born: April 9, 1981 (age 44); Queens, New York, U.S.
- Batted: Right Threw: Right

Professional debut
- MLB: September 3, 2006, for the Milwaukee Brewers
- NPB: April 14, 2011, for the Hiroshima Toyo Carp

Last appearance
- MLB: October 4, 2009, for the Baltimore Orioles
- NPB: April, 2018, for the Fukuoka SoftBank Hawks

MLB statistics
- Win–loss record: 5–4
- Earned run average: 4.53
- Strikeouts: 131

NPB statistics
- Win–loss record: 27–20
- Earned run average: 1.57
- Strikeouts: 574
- Saves: 234
- Stats at Baseball Reference

Teams
- Milwaukee Brewers (2006); Houston Astros (2007); Baltimore Orioles (2008–2009); Hiroshima Toyo Carp (2011–2012); Saitama Seibu Lions (2013); Fukuoka SoftBank Hawks (2014–2021)

Career highlights and awards
- 3× NPB All-Star (2011, 2014, 2016); 5× Japan Series Champion (2014, 2015, 2017-2019); Pacific League MVP (2017); Japan Series Most Valuable Player Award (2017); Matsutaro Shoriki Award (2017); 3× Pacific League Saves Leader (2015, 2016, 2017)

Dennis Scott Sarfate (born April 9, 1981) is an American former professional baseball pitcher. He played for the Milwaukee Brewers, Houston Astros, and Baltimore Orioles of Major League Baseball (MLB) and the Hiroshima Toyo Carp, Saitama Seibu Lions, and Fukuoka SoftBank Hawks of Nippon Professional Baseball (NPB). While an average reliever in MLB, Sarfate became one of the greatest closers in NPB history after moving his career overseas. Sarfate holds several NPB records, including most saves in a season and most by a foreign-born pitcher. As of 2020, his 234 career saves rank fifth-most in NPB history. He is a 3× NPB All-Star, a 3× Pacific League saves leader, a 5× Japan Series Champion, won the Japan Series Most Valuable Player Award, won the Pacific League MVP Award, and won the Matsutaro Shoriki Award.

== Early life ==
Sarfate was born in Queens, New York, to Dennis Sarfate and Linda Williams. He has two sisters, Jaime and Jennifer.

== Amateur career ==
Sarfate graduated from Gilbert High School in Gilbert, Arizona in 1999. He was an All-American and First Team All-State, after going 10–2 with a 1.75 ERA and 110 strikeouts in 81 innings in his senior year. He was the Scottsdale Tribune Pitcher of the Year in 1999.

The Texas Rangers selected Sarfate in the 15th round (465th overall) of the 1999 MLB draft. He did not sign, enrolling in college. He attended Arizona State University in 2000, majoring in sports psychology, and Chandler-Gilbert Community College in 2001.

== Professional career ==
=== Milwaukee Brewers ===
The Milwaukee Brewers selected Sarfate in the ninth round (268th overall) of the 2001 MLB draft. In 2003, while pitching for the Single-A Beloit Snappers in the Midwest League, he was 12–2 with a 2.84 ERA in 26 starts, and 140 strikeouts (second in the league) in 139.2 innings.

He made his MLB debut on September 3, 2006, striking out three batters in 1.1 scoreless innings against the Florida Marlins. Sarfate pitched in eight games for the Brewers, with a 4.32 earned run average (ERA), and 11 strikeouts in 8.1 innings.

=== Houston Astros ===
The Brewers traded Sarfate to the Houston Astros on September 11, 2007, for cash considerations. After beginning his professional career as a starter, Sarfate spent 2007 as a relief pitcher. He made seven relief appearances for Houston, and was 1–0 with a 1.08 ERA and 14 strikeouts in 8.1 innings.

=== Baltimore Orioles ===
On December 12, 2007, the Astros traded Sarfate along with designated hitter/left fielder Luke Scott, pitchers Matt Albers and Troy Patton, and third baseman Michael Costanzo to the Baltimore Orioles in exchange for shortstop Miguel Tejada.

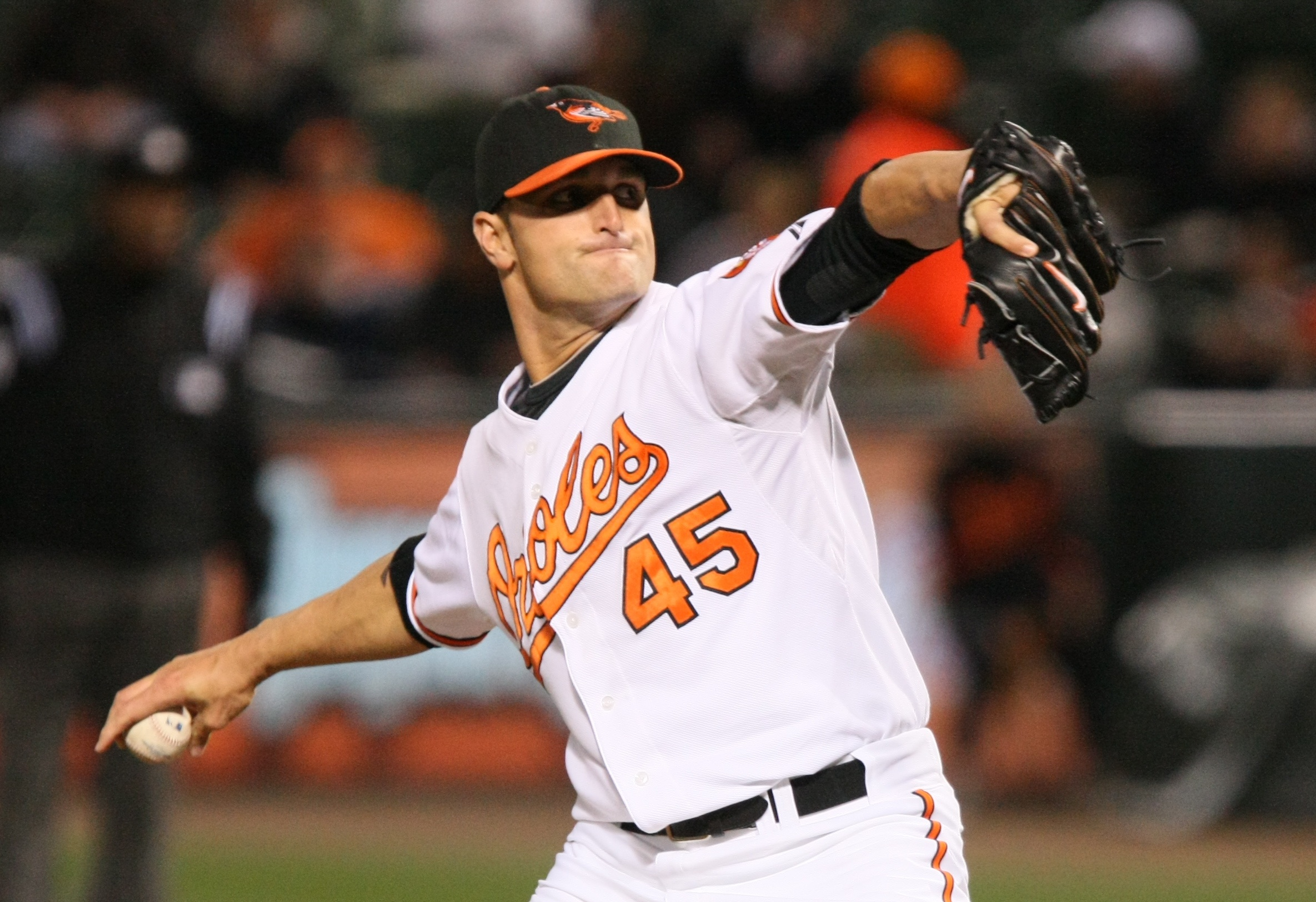
Sarfate pitching for the Baltimore Orioles in 2009

Sarfate also began 2008 as a relief pitcher. On July 28, 2008, he was moved to the Orioles' starting rotation. He returned to the bullpen after just four starts, in which he went 0–2 while allowing 18 runs in just 15 2/3 innings. Overall, in 57 games, he was 4–3 with a 4.74 ERA and 85 strikeouts in 79.2 innings.

Sarfate began 2009 in the Orioles' bullpen, but was placed on the disabled list in May after posting a 6.39 ERA in eight appearances. He was activated in September, and pitched much better, posting a 3.48 ERA over 12 relief appearances. Overall, he was 0–1 in 20 relief appearances with a 5.09 ERA and 20 strikeouts in 23 innings.

In 2010, Sarfate pitched with the Triple-A Norfolk Tides, where he was 2–2 with 20 saves (tied for seventh in the International League) and a 2.73 ERA in 47 games, as he struck out 72 batters in 56 innings. He was named an MiLB Organization All Star.

=== Hiroshima Toyo Carp ===
In 2011, Sarfate signed with the Hiroshima Toyo Carp of Japan's Central League. Sarfate quickly became one of the top closers in Japanese baseball. He was a 2011 All Star. In 2011 he was 1–3 with 35 saves (second in the Japan Central League) and a 1.34 ERA in 57 games. In 2012, he was 2–5 with nine saves (ninth in the league) and a 2.90 ERA in 47 games.

=== Saitama Seibu Lions ===
He spent one season with the Saitama Seibu Lions in 2013. Sarfate was 9–1 with 10 saves (seventh in the Japan Pacific League) and a 1.87 ERA (eighth) in 58 games (seventh).

=== Fukuoka SoftBank Hawks ===
In 2014, Sarfate joined the Fukuoka SoftBank Hawks, and got the final save of the 2014 Japan Series. He was a 2014 All Star. For the season he was 7–1 with 37 saves (second in the Japan Pacific League) and a 1.05 ERA (third) in 64 games (third).

In 2015, Sarfate closed out the 2015 Japan Series as well, as the Hawks won their second championship in a row. For the season he was 5–1 with 41 saves (leading the league) and a 1.11 ERA (fourth) in 65 games (third).

During the 2016 season, Sarfate recorded 43 saves, a new record for most single-season saves in the Pacific League. He was named a 2016 All Star. For the season he was 0–7 with a 1.88 ERA (seventh in the league) in 64 games (second).

On April 2, 2017, Sarfate recorded his 178th save in Japan, setting a new record for most saves by a foreign pitcher in Nippon Professional Baseball history. The record was previously held by Marc Kroon of the Yomiuri Giants (177). On July 4, 2017, Sarfate recorded his 200th save, becoming the sixth pitcher in NPB history to reach that threshold and the first foreign pitcher. On September 5, 2017, Sarfate earned his 47th save of the season, breaking the record for most single-season saves in Japanese baseball history. He finished the season leading the league with 54 saves, as he was 2–2 with a 1.09 ERA (fourth in the league) in 66 games (second). Sarfate earned two saves and a win in the 2017 Japan Series, and won the Japan Series Most Valuable Player Award. He won the Pacific League MVP. He also received the Matsutaro Shoriki Award, for the year's greatest contribution to Japanese professional baseball.

Sarfate had season-ending surgery on his right hip in April 2018, after pitching six innings. He missed the 2019 season as well. His 234 career saves rank seventh-most in NPB history.

On October 14, 2020, Sarfate underwent hip reoperation and spent the 2020 season in rehabilitation. On November 30, 2021, Sarfate announced his retirement from professional baseball, having missed the past three seasons due to injury.
