= Dae-ho Lee =

South Korean baseball player (born 1982)

Lee Dae-ho
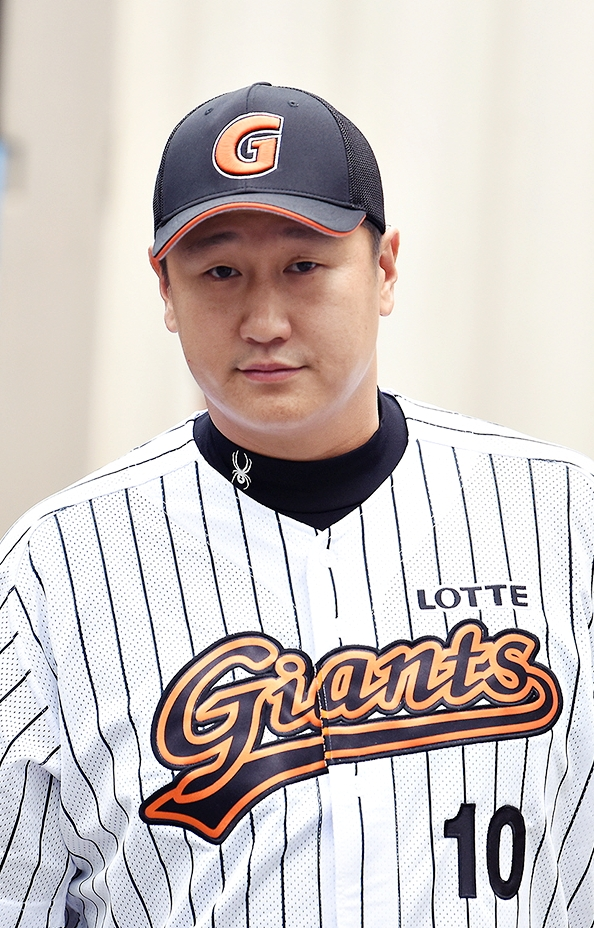
- Lee with the Lotte Giants
- First baseman
- Born: June 21, 1982 (age 44); Busan, South Korea
- Batted: Right Threw: Right

Professional debut
- KBO: September 19, 2001, for the Lotte Giants
- NPB: March 30, 2012, for the Orix Buffaloes
- MLB: April 4, 2016, for the Seattle Mariners

Last appearance
- KBO: October 8, 2022, for the Lotte Giants
- NPB: October 29, 2015, for the Fukuoka SoftBank Hawks
- MLB: October 3, 2016, for the Seattle Mariners

KBO statistics
- Batting average: .309
- Home runs: 374
- Runs batted in: 1,425

NPB statistics
- Batting average: .293
- Home runs: 98
- Runs batted in: 348

MLB statistics
- Batting average: .253
- Home runs: 14
- Runs batted in: 49
- Stats at Baseball Reference

Teams
- Lotte Giants (2001–2011); Orix Buffaloes (2012–2013); Fukuoka SoftBank Hawks (2014–2015); Seattle Mariners (2016); Lotte Giants (2017–2022)

Career highlights and awards
- KBO: KBO MVP (2010); 7× KBO Golden Glove Award (2006–2007, 2010–2011, 2017–2018, 2022); 2× KBO Triple Crown (2006, 2010); NPB: RBI leader of PL (2012); Pacific League Best Nine Award (2012); 3× NPB All-Star (2012–2014); 2× Japan Series Champion (2014, 2015); Japan Series MVP (2015); International: WBSC Premier12 All-World Team (2015)
Medals
Men's baseball
Representing South Korea
Olympic Games
Gold medal – first place	2008 Beijing	Team
World Baseball Classic
Silver medal – second place	2009 Los Angeles	Team
2015 WBSC Premier12
Gold medal – first place	2015 Tokyo	Team
World Junior Baseball Championship
Gold medal – first place	2000 Edmonton	Team

- Dae-ho Lee
- Hangul: 이대호
- Hanja: 李大浩
- RR: I Daeho
- MR: I Taeho

Lee Dae-ho (Korean: 이대호; Korean pronunciation: [i.tɛ.ɦo]; born June 21, 1982) is a South Korean professional baseball player who played as a first baseman. During his career, he played for the Lotte Giants of the KBO League, Orix Buffaloes and Fukuoka SoftBank Hawks of Nippon Professional Baseball (NPB), and the Seattle Mariners of Major League Baseball (MLB).

Lee batted and threw right-handed. He hit home runs in nine consecutive games for the first time in world baseball history. According to a Gallup Korea's survey conducted in 2011, Lee was chosen as the most popular player in the KBO League.

== Amateur career ==
Lee started baseball because of his childhood friendship with Shin-soo Choo. Lee attended Kyungnam High School in Busan, South Korea. At Kyungnam High School, Lee batted fourth and could throw a mid-90s mph fastball as a pitcher. In 2000, he was selected for the South Korean Junior National Team as a pitcher. The team won the 2000 World Junior Baseball Championship in Edmonton, Alberta, Canada, and Lee led the attack alongside Kim Tae-kyun, Choo Shin-soo (the eventual MVP of this event) and Jeong Keun-woo as a cleanup hitter by racking up 3 home runs. He also finished runner-up behind Joe Mauer of Team USA in batting average (.500).

=== Notable international careers ===
Year	Venue	Competition	Team	Individual note
2000	Canada	World Junior Baseball Championship	Gold medal	.500 BA (15-for-30), 3 HR

== Professional career ==
=== KBO League ===
==== 2001 season ====
As a rookie, Lee joined the Lotte Giants as a pitcher in 2001. However, following an injury, he was officially changed to a position player for the second half of the 2001 season.

==== 2006 season ====
In the 2006 season, Lee won the league's Triple Crown with a .336 batting average, 26 home runs, and 88 RBIs. This is the second time a hitter has won the Batting Triple Crown in the Korea Professional Baseball league. He finished second in voting for the 2006 MVP behind the Hanhwa Eagles pitcher Ryu Hyun-jin, also the winner of the Triple Crown for pitchers in 2006.

==== 2008 season ====
In 2008, Lee was a member of the South Korea national baseball team that won the gold medal at the 2008 Summer Olympics, while he had an average of .360 (9-for-36), 3 home runs, 10 RBIs, 5 runs, and .760 slugging percentage, playing as the designated hitter.

==== 2010 season ====
On August 13, 2010, Lee wrote a new chapter in Korean baseball by hitting a home run in eight straight games in the league. The eighth home run was hit at an away match against the Kia Tigers in Gwangju in the top of the seventh inning when he sent former Major Leaguer Aquilino López's fifth pitch over the left fence of Moodeung Stadium. This tied the existing record in world professional baseball shared by Ken Griffey Jr. in 1993, Don Mattingly in 1987 and Dale Long in 1956. On August 14, 2010, Lee set a world record by hitting a home run in his ninth straight game when, in the second inning of Giants' second away match against the Tigers, he blasted a three-run homer off Tigers reliever Kim Hee-girl over the center fence of Moodeung Stadium. It was his 38th home run of the season. With his 83rd run that year, he set a new Korean League record with a run in 16 consecutive games. In the 2010 season, Lee enjoyed one of the most dominant offensive seasons in world professional baseball history, leading the KBO in seven offensive categories (batting average, HRs, RBIs, runs scored, on-base percentage, slugging percentage and hits), which made him a Septuple Crown winner (7관왕).

==== 2011 season ====
Lee led the KBO League in batting average (.357), hits (176), and on-base percentage (.433). After the season, he declared free agency and sought out a new challenge.

=== Nippon Professional Baseball ===
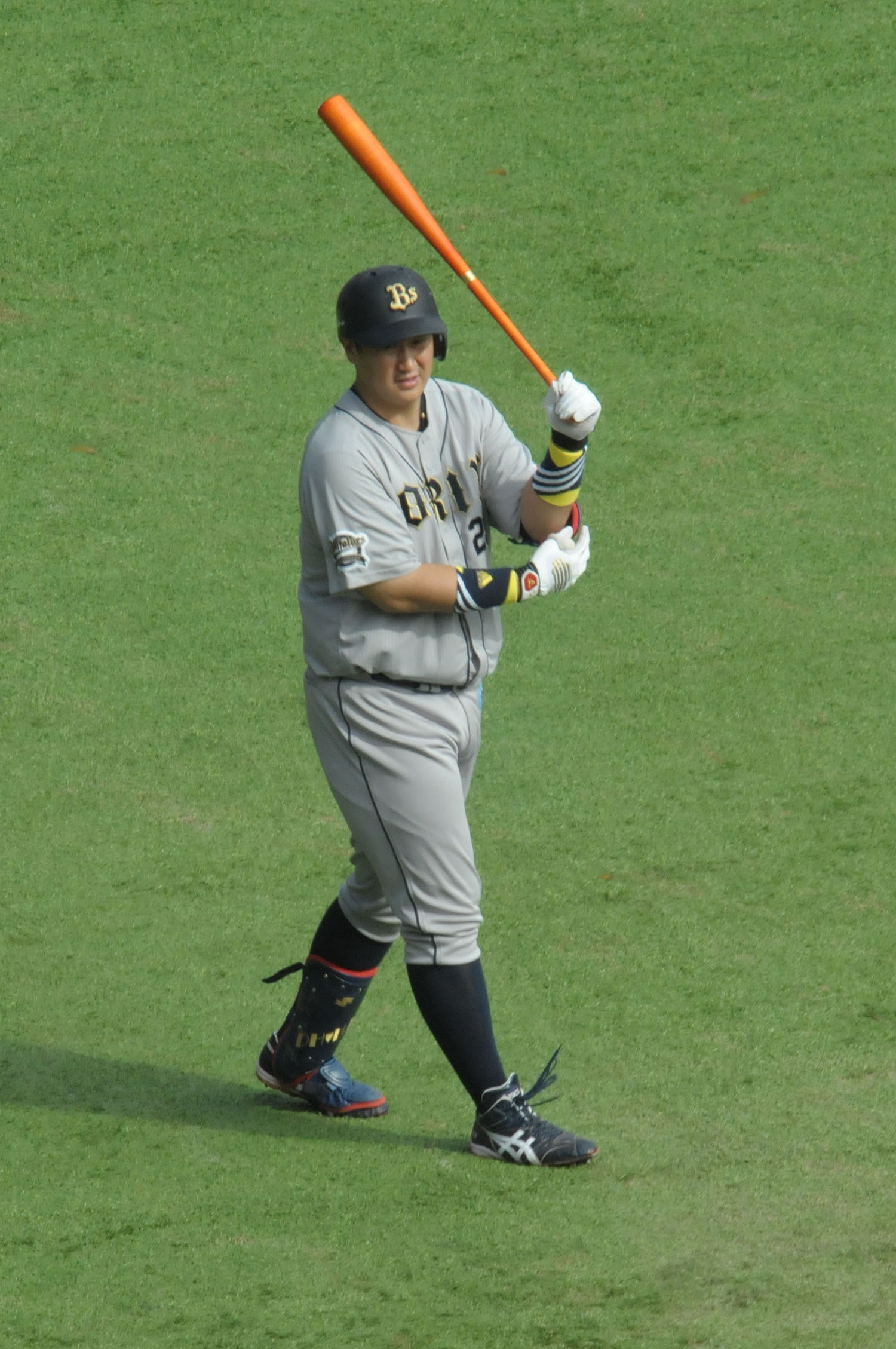
The Buffaloes' Lee Dae-ho at QVC Marine Field.

In December 2011, Lee signed a two-year contract worth 760 million yen ($9.78 million) with the Orix Buffaloes of the Nippon Professional Baseball.

==== 2012 season ====
On July 20, 2012, at the Osaka Dome, Lee won the NPB Home Run Derby against Wladimir Balentien of the Tokyo Yakult Swallows. Lee hit 6 home runs while Balentien made no home runs and received a 500,000 yen ($6,400) award. He ended his season with a .286 average, 24 home runs, and 91 RBI. In this season, he led the Pacific League in OPS.

=== Major League Baseball ===
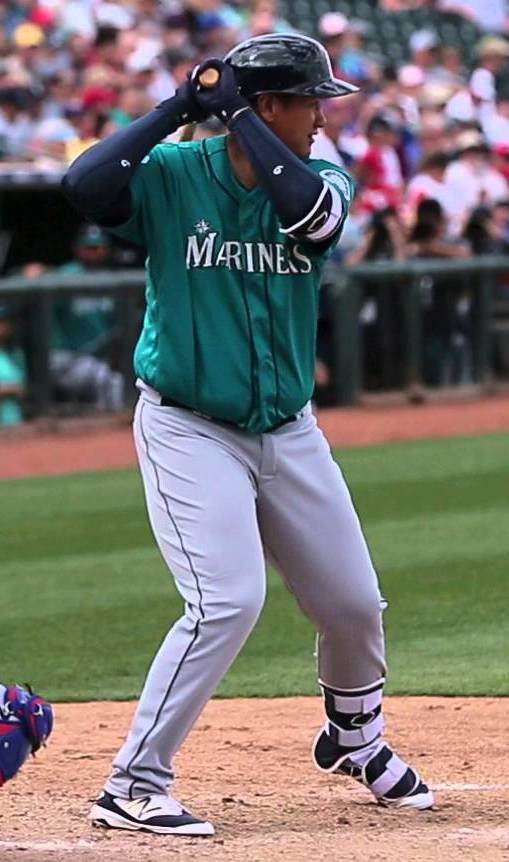
Lee with the Mariners in 2016

On February 3, 2016, Lee signed a minor league contract with the Seattle Mariners of Major League Baseball. The Mariners added Lee to the 40-man roster on March 27.

On April 8, Lee recorded his first MLB hit, a home run off Eric Surkamp of the Oakland Athletics. On April 13, Lee hit a pinch-hit walk-off home run to beat the Texas Rangers. This was the first rookie pinch-hit walk-off in Mariners history. On May 4, Lee hit two home runs in a 9–8 victory over Oakland.

On June 10, Lee hit home runs in consecutive plate appearances against Derek Holland, totaling 4 RBI to propel the Mariners to a 7–5 victory over the Texas Rangers.

Lee finished his one season in MLB with a .253 average and 14 home runs.

=== KBO League (second stint) ===
On January 24, 2017, Lee signed a four-year, $12.9 million contract with the Lotte Giants. The contract was the largest for a free agent in KBO history. He said his last wish as a player was to win a championship with the Giants. Lee's 2017 season was a success, as he hit .320 with 34 home runs and 111 RBIs. He helped Lotte return to the postseason for the first time in five years.

In 2018, he hit .333 with 37 home runs and 125 RBIs. However, in 2019, Lee failed to reach 20 home runs for the first time in 10 years and was sent to the second division due to injuries.

Lee re-signed with the Giants ahead of the 2021 season.

On October 8, 2022, Lee's final professional game, he made his first career appearance as a pitcher. In the outing, he got LG Twins closer Go Woo-suk to ground out to him on a comebacker to the mound.

== Post-playing career ==
Currently, Lee is working as a broadcaster who appears on various broadcasts after his retirement.

"A Clean Sweep", a broadcast program in which retired legendary baseball players gather to play against high school, university, and social baseball teams, is currently his core broadcast activity.

In addition to broadcasting activities, Lee has started a YouTube channel (이대호 [RE:DAEHO]), steadily producing baseball-related contents.

== Awards and honors ==
=== KBO League ===
- 2005 KBO All-Star MVP
- 2008 KBO All-Star MVP
- 2006 KBO Golden Glove Award (1B)
- 2007 KBO Golden Glove Award (1B)
- 2010 KBO MVP (regular season MVP)
- 2010 KBO Golden Glove Award (3B)
- 2011 KBO Golden Glove Award (1B)
- 2017 KBO Golden Glove Award (1B)
- 2018 KBO Golden Glove Award (DH)

=== Nippon Professional Baseball ===
- 2012 Pacific League Best Nine Award (1B)

=== Local & Media ===
- 2000 Busan Baseball MVP
- 2004 Sports Chosun Player of the Year Achievement Award
- 2006 KPBPA Player of the Year
- 2006 Jeil Fire Insurance Pro Baseball MVP
- 2006 11th ILGOO MVP
- 2006 Sports Toto Hitter of the Year
- 2007 Jeil Fire Insurance Pro Baseball Best Hitter
- 2009 CJ Magumagu Pro Baseball Charity Golden Glove Award
- 2010 Choa Pharm Pro Baseball Grand Prize
- 2010 Sports Toto Player of the Year
- 2010 Sports Toto Record of the Year
- 2010 CJ Magumagu ILGOO Best Hitter
- 2012 ILGOO Special Contribution Award
- 2012 Choa Pharm Pro Baseball Special Award
- 2014 Choa Pharm Pro Baseball Special Award

=== Achievements ===
==== KBO League ====
- 2006 Batting title
- 2006 Home run title
- 2006 RBI title
- 2006 Slugging percentage leader
- 2006 Triple Crown (BA, HR, RBI title)
- 2007 Slugging percentage leader
- 2010 Batting title
- 2010 Home run title
- 2010 RBI title
- 2010 Hits leader
- 2010 Runs scored leader
- 2010 Slugging percentage leader
- 2010 On-base percentage leader
- 2010 OPS (on-base plus slugging) leader
- 2010 Triple Crown (BA, HR, RBI title)
- 2010 Nine consecutive home runs (world record)
- 2011 Batting title
- 2011 Hits leader
- 2011 On-base percentage leader

==== Nippon Professional Baseball ====
- 2012 RBI title

=== Notable international careers ===
Year	Venue	Competition	Team	Individual note
2006	Qatar	Asian Games	Bronze medal	.409 BA (9-for-22), 2 HR, 10 RBI, 4 R
2007	Chinese Taipei	Asian Baseball Championship	Silver medal	.000 BA (0-for-4)
2008	Chinese Taipei	Final Olympic Qualification Tournament	Silver medal	.393 BA (11-for-28), 8 RBI, 4 R
2008	China	Olympic Games	Gold medal	.360 BA (9-for-25), 3 HR, 10 RBI, 5 R
2009	United States	World Baseball Classic	Silver medal	.278 BA (5-for-18), 5 RBI, 1 R
2010	China	Asian Games	Gold medal	.368 BA (7-for-19), 1 HR

== Media appearances ==
Year	Channel	Program	Episode(s) / Air Date
2010	KBS	2 Days & 1 Night	2010.12.12
2011	MBC	Golden Fishery	EP 214 & 215
2012	KNN	Delicious Asian Food Hunter	2012.09.04
2012	KBS	KBS Special	2012.11.04
2012	KBS	Win Win	2012.11.11
2015	MBC	Radio Star	EP 407
2016	KBS N Sports	The Legend: Dream of Chosun's No.4 Hitter	2016.05.02
2016	JTBC	Please Take Care of My Refrigerator	EP 106 & 107
2016	SBS	Flower Crew	2016.11.27
2016	KBS	Happy Together	EP 477
2018	SBS	Master in the House	EP 4 & 5
2021	SBS	Law of the Jungle	2021.01.16
2022	MBC	DNA Mate	2022.06.07
2022	tvN	You Quiz on the Block	EP 166
2022	MBC	Radio Star	2022.10.26
2022	MBN	Hi Bye	2022.11.21
2022	JTBC	Mukja Go	2022.11.22
2022	SBS	Team Up 072 Season 4	2022.12.07
2022	Channel S	Attack of the Sisters	2022.12.07
2023	SBS	Master in the House S2	2023.01.01
2023	MBC	Buddy into the Wild	EP 106,107,112,113,140,141
2023	Channel A	City Fisherman	2023.01.14
2023	SBS	Team Up 072 Season 5	2023.03.22
2023	JTBC	A Clean Sweep S2	2023.04.10
2023	MBC	Where Is My Home	2023.11.23
2024	MBC	A Clean Sweep S3	2024.04.15

== See also ==
- List of KBO career home run leaders
- List of KBO career RBI leaders
- List of KBO career hits leaders
