= Jason Standridge =

American baseball player (born 1978)

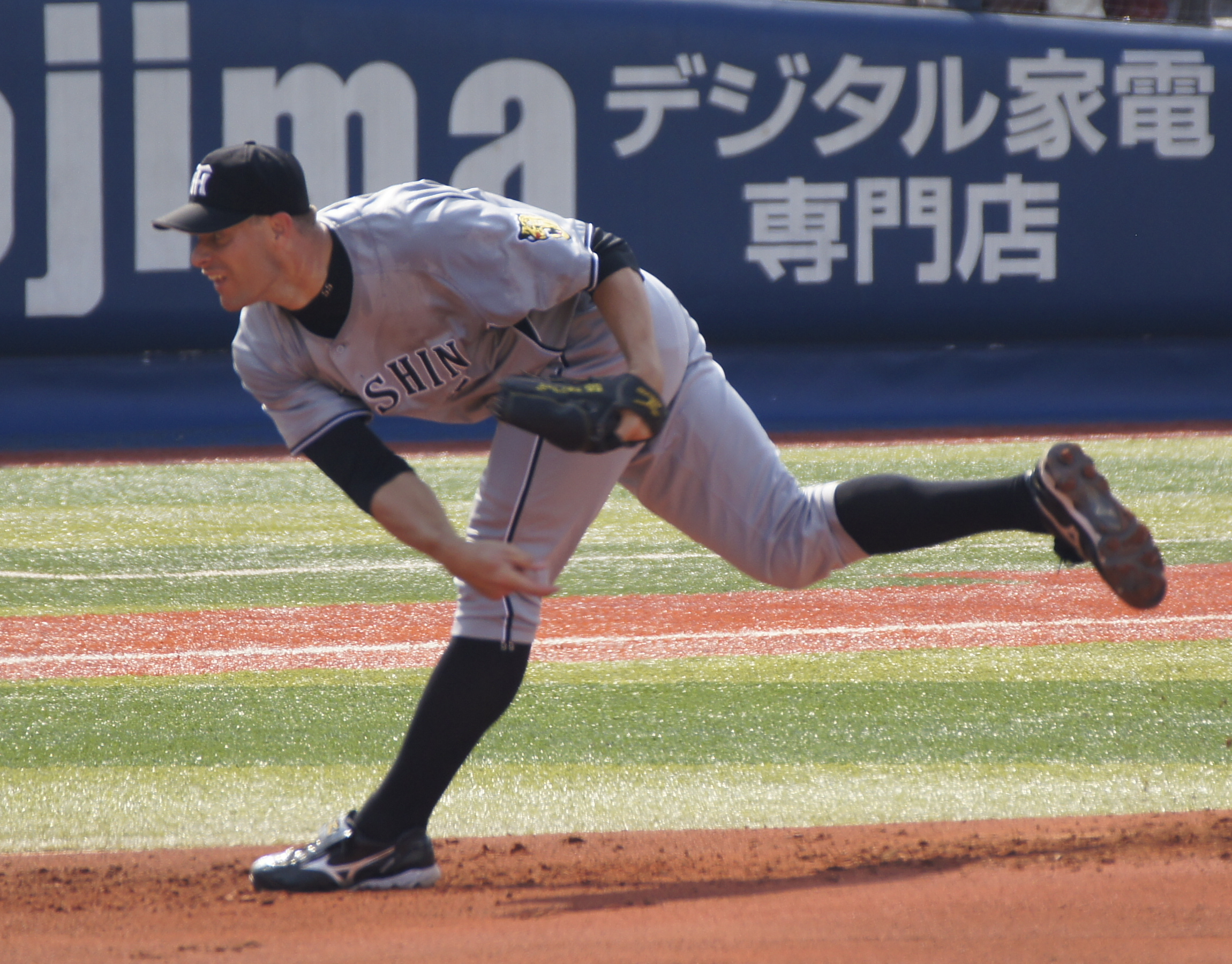
- Standridge with the Hanshin Tigers
- Pitcher
- Born: November 9, 1978 (age 47); Birmingham, Alabama, U.S.
- Batted: Right Threw: Right

Professional debut
- MLB: July 29, 2001, for the Tampa Bay Devil Rays
- NPB: June 23, 2007, for the Fukuoka SoftBank Hawks

Last appearance
- MLB: May 19, 2007, for the Kansas City Royals
- NPB: 2017, for the Chiba Lotte Marines

MLB statistics
- Win–loss record: 3–9
- Earned run average: 5.80
- Strikeoutss: 80

NPB statistics
- Win–loss record: 72–65
- Earned run average: 3.31
- Strikeouts: 814
- Stats at Baseball Reference

Teams
- Tampa Bay Devil Rays (2001–2004); Texas Rangers (2005); Cincinnati Reds (2005–2006); Kansas City Royals (2007); Fukuoka SoftBank Hawks (2007–2008); Hanshin Tigers (2010–2013); Fukuoka SoftBank Hawks (2014–2015); Chiba Lotte Marines (2016–2017)

Career highlights and awards
- 2× Japan Series champion (2014, 2015)

Jason Wayne Standridge (born November 9, 1978) is an American former professional baseball pitcher. He played in Major League Baseball (MLB) and in Nippon Professional Baseball (NPB).

== Career ==
Standridge made his major league debut with the Tampa Bay Rays in 2001. He played parts of seven seasons in MLB, appearing in 80 games, while compiling an overall 3–9 record with a 5.80 ERA.

Standridge signed with the Fukuoka SoftBank Hawks on June 3, 2007. After a 7–1 record in 17 games for the Hawks in 2007, he struggled with injuries in 2008, posting an 0–2 record in three games, and was subsequently released.

In January 2009, Standridge inked a minor league contract with the Florida Marlins. He was assigned to the Marlins' AAA affiliate, the New Orleans Zephyrs, but was released by the team in late April after a lackluster showing.

On January 14, 2010, Standridge signed a minor league contract with the Philadelphia Phillies, but was released after spring training. He signed a contract on April 5 to return to Nippon Professional Baseball with the Hanshin Tigers. Standridge played four seasons with the Tigers and had an overall record of 35–36.

Standridge returned to Fukuoka as a key starter for SoftBank's 2014 and 2015 Nippon Series championship teams, making a combined 49 regular season starts, with an overall 21–15 record.

Standridge signed with the Chiba Lotte Marines of NPB's Pacific League for the 2016 season. In his first year with the Marines, he made 26 starts and had a 7–8 record with a 4.12 ERA. He was released on January 15, 2018.

Standridge retired after the 2018 season.

Standridge featured a fastball, curveball, slider, and changeup.

== Personal life ==
Standridge graduated from Hewitt-Trussville High School in suburban Birmingham.
