= Toru Hosokawa =

Japanese baseball player (born 1980)

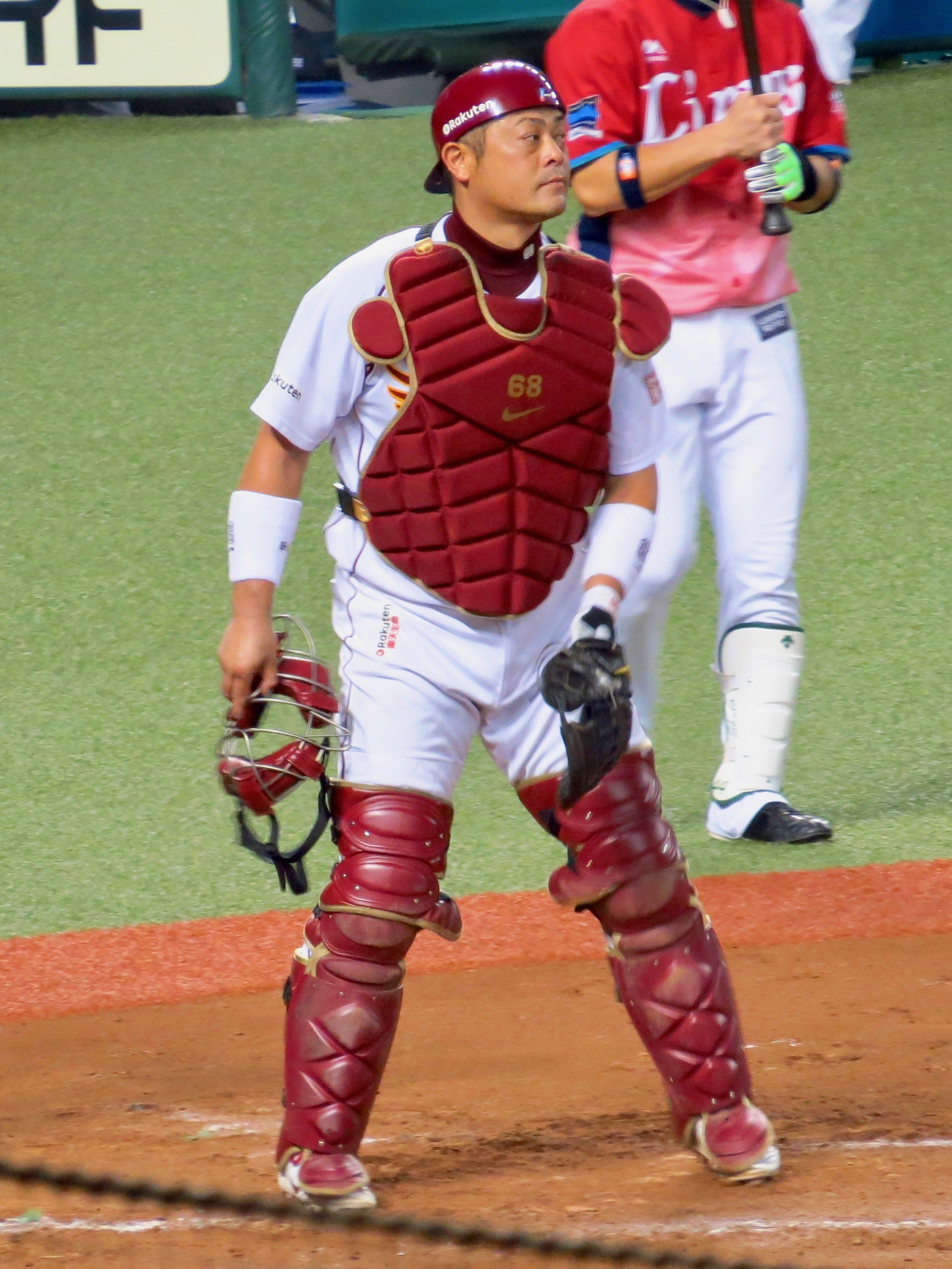
- Hosokawa with the Tohoku Rakuten Golden Eagles in 2017

Fukuoka SoftBank Hawks – No. 87
- Catcher / Manager / Coach
- Born: January 4, 1980 (age 46); Hiranai, Aomori, Japan
- Batted: Right Threw: Right

NPB debut
- September 22, 2002, for the Seibu Lions

Last NPB appearance
- November 9, 2020, for the Chiba Lotte Marines

NPB statistics
- Batting average: .203
- Home runs: 84
- Runs batted in: 367
- Stats at Baseball Reference

Teams
- As player: Seibu Lions/Saitama Seibu Lions (2002–2010); Fukuoka SoftBank Hawks (2011–2016); Tohoku Rakuten Golden Eagles (2017–2018); Chiba Lotte Marines (2019–2020); As manager: Hinokuni Salamanders (2021); As coach: Rokitechno Toyama (2022–2024); Fukuoka SoftBank Hawks (2025–present)

Career highlights and awards
- As player: NPB All-Star (2008); 2× Pacific League Best Nine Award (2008, 2011); 2× Pacific League Golden Glove Award (2008, 2011); 5× Japan Series champion (2004, 2008, 2011, 2014, 2015); As coach: Japan Series champion (2025)

Toru Hosokawa (細川 亨, Hosokawa Tōru; born in Hiranai, Aomori, Japan) is a Japanese former professional baseball catcher. He played in Nippon Professional Baseball (NPB) for the Seibu Lions/Saitama Seibu Lions, Fukuoka SoftBank Hawks, Tohoku Rakuten Golden Eagles, and Chiba Lotte Marines.

== Career ==
=== Playing career ===
Hosokawa selected Seibu Lions in the 2001 NPB draft.

On September 22, 2002, Hosokawa made his NPB debut.

On November 9, 2020, Hosokawa announced his retirement.

=== Managing career ===
On December 8, 2020, Hosoya become manager for the Hinokuni Salamanders of Kyusyu Independence professional baseball league.
