= Shota Takeda =

Japanese baseball player (born 1993)

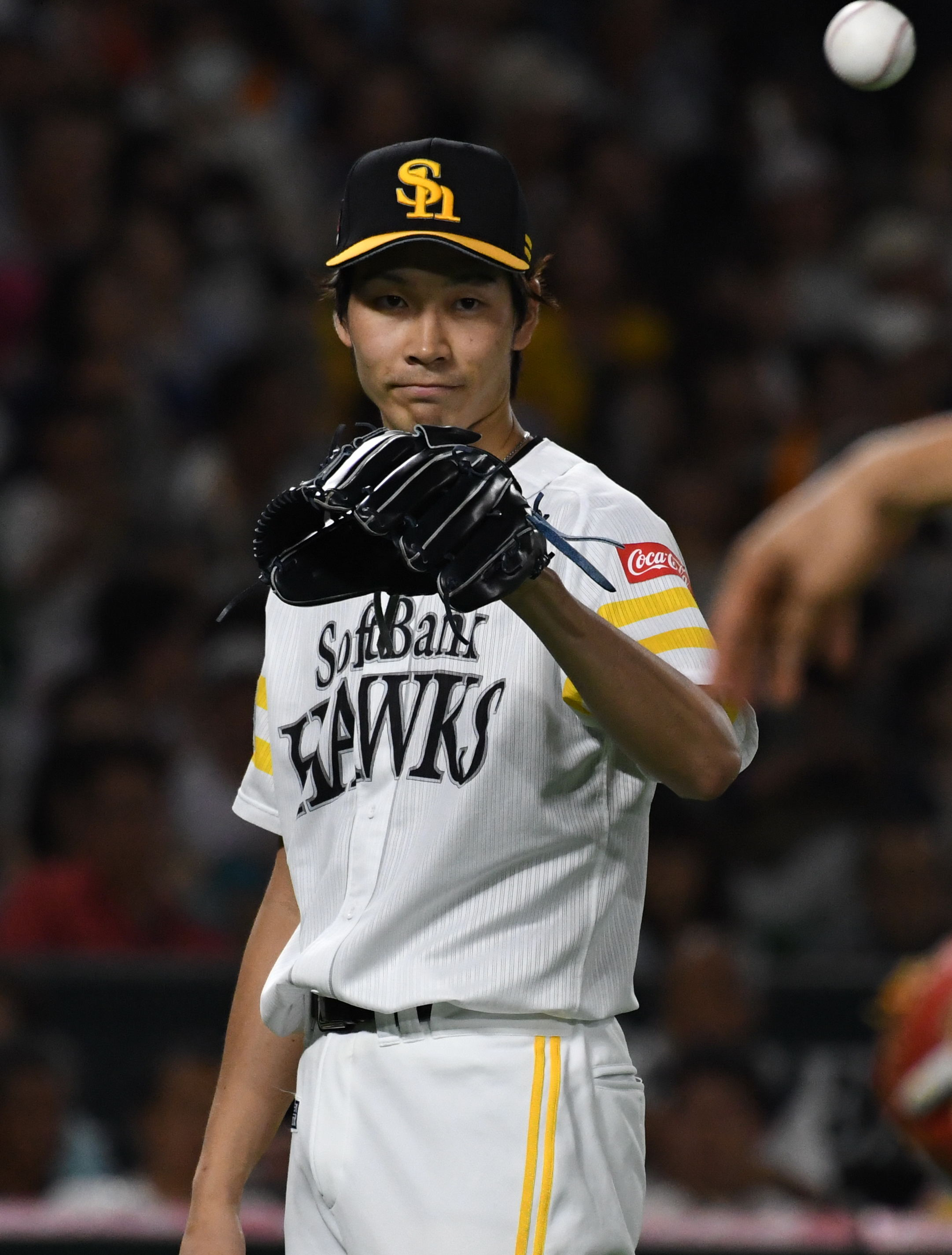
- Takeda with the Fukuoka SoftBank Hawks

SSG Landers – No. 23
- Pitcher
- Born: April 3, 1993 (age 33); Miyazaki, Miyazaki, Japan
- Bats: Right Throws: Right

Professional debut
- NPB: July 7, 2012, for the Fukuoka SoftBank Hawks
- KBO: April 1, 2026, for the SSG Landers

NPB statistics (through 2023 season)
- Win–loss record: 66–48
- Earned run average: 3.34
- Strikeouts: 858

KBO statistics (through August 19, 2026)
- Win–loss record: 2-10
- Earned run average: 7.86
- Strikeouts: 69
- Stats at Baseball Reference

Teams
- Fukuoka SoftBank Hawks (2012–2025); SSG Landers (2026–present)

Career highlights and awards
- Pacific League Excellent rookie award (2012); NPB All-Star (2014); 7× Japan Series Champion (2014–2015, 2017–2020, 2025); 2× Japan Series Excellent Player Award (2014, 2015)
Medals
Men's baseball
Representing Japan
2015 WBSC Premier12
Bronze medal – third place	2015 Tokyo	Team
2017 World Baseball Classic
Bronze medal – third place	2017	Team

Shota Takeda (武田 翔太, Takeda Shota; born April 3, 1993) is a Japanese professional baseball pitcher for the SSG Landers of the KBO League. He has previously played in Nippon Professional Baseball (NPB) for the Fukuoka SoftBank Hawks.

== Professional career ==
=== Fukuoka SoftBank Hawks ===
On October 27, 2011, Takeda was drafted by the Fukuoka SoftBank Hawks with the first overall pick in the 2011 Nippon Professional Baseball draft.

==== 2012–2015 ====
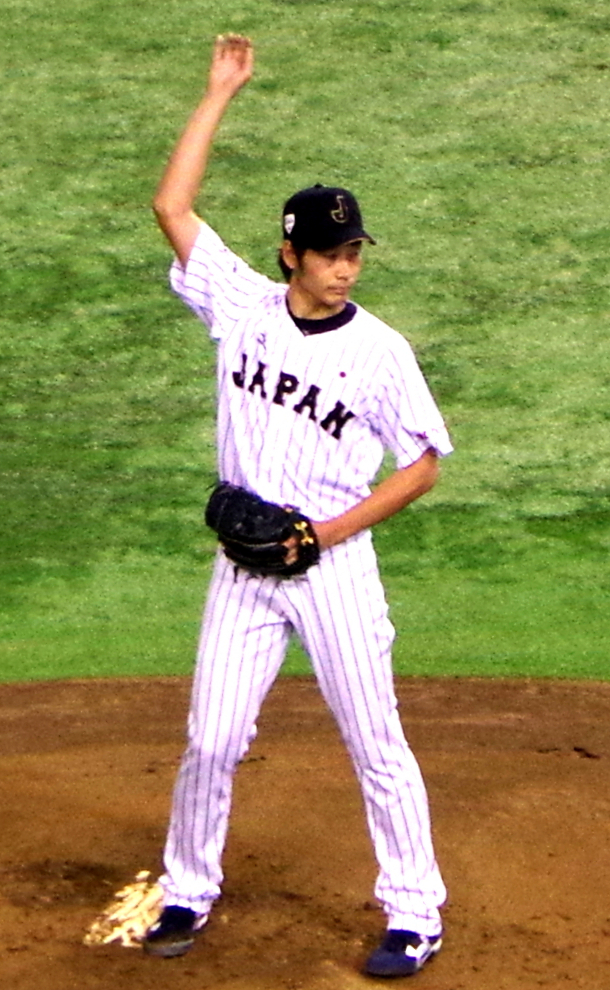
Takeda with the Japan national baseball team in 2015.

On July 7, 2012, Takeda pitched his debut game against the Hokkaido Nippon-Ham Fighters as a starting pitcher, and won the game for the first time in the Pacific League. He finished the 2012 season appearing in 11 games and posting a 8–1 record, 1.07 ERA, and 67 strikeouts across 67 innings. On November 20, he was honored with the 2012 Pacific League Excellent rookie award.

In 2013, Takeda finished the regular season with 17 appearances, a 4–4 record, 3.48 ERA, and 56 strikeouts across 93 innings.

In 2014, Takeda developed pain in his right shoulder during spring camp and spent half of the year in rehabilitation. On August 6, he made his return from injury and pitched against the Saitama Seibu Lions. He finished the regular season making 7 outings and logging a 3–3 record, 1.87 ERA, and 43 strikeouts in 43 1/3 innings of work. On October 26, he started against the Hanshin Tigers during the Japan Series, and recorded the win. Takeda was later honored with the 2014 Japan Series Excellent Player Award.

On November 7, Takeda was selected as the Japan national baseball team for 2014 MLB Japan All-Star Series. On November 20, he pitched against the MLB All-Stars as a starting pitcher. He would record the win as Japan won for the first time in the MLB Japan All-Star Series.

In 2015, Takeda finished the regular season appearing in 25 games and registering a 13–6 record, 3.17 ERA, and 163 strikeouts in 164 2/3 innings pitched. On October 24, he pitched against the Tokyo Yakult Swallows in the 2015 Japan Series as the starting pitcher, and won the game. He was honored with the 2015 Japan Series Excellent Player Award for the second time in his career.

==== 2016–2020 ====
In 2016, Takeda finished the regular season with 27 games pitched, a 14–8 record, 2.95 ERA, and 144 strikeouts across 183 innings.

On February 4, 2017, Takeda was selected to the Japan national baseball team for 2017 World Baseball Classic. On April 14, he developed inflammation in his right shoulder and spent time rehabilitating until the summer. He finished the 2017 season with 13 appearances, a 6–4 record, 3.68 ERA, and 60 strikeouts in 71 innings of work. On October 31, Takeda started against the Yokohama DeNA BayStars in the 2017 Japan Series.

In 2018, Takeda finished the regular season with 27 appearances, a 4–9 record, 4.48 ERA, one save, and 87 strikeouts across 124 2/3 innings pitched. He additionally pitched as a relief pitcher against the Hiroshima Toyo Carp in the 2018 Japan Series.

In 2019, Takeda finished the regular season appearing in 32 contests, and posted a 5–3 record, 4.55 ERA, one save, and 70 strikeouts in 83 innings of work. He was also selected to the Japan Series roster in the 2019 Japan Series.

In the COVID-19–affected 2020 season, Takeda pitched in only 7 contests, logging a 2–2 record, 6.48 ERA, and 23 strikeouts in 25 innings. The Hawks would go on to appear in the 2020 Japan Series against the Yomiuri Giants.

==== 2021–2025 ====
In 2021, Takeda began the year pitching out of Fukuoka's rotation, but developed tenosynovitis in his right hand during an interleague game and spent the remainder of the season in rehabilitation. In 12 games, he had logged a 4–5 record, 2.68 ERA, and 73 strikeouts across 77 1/3 innings pitched.

Takeda began the 2022 season on the injured list with enthesitis of the latissimus dorsi muscle before being activated in July. He would return to the injured list in August with inflammation of the ligaments in his right elbow. He finished the regular season making 10 appearances for the Hawks and pitching to a 2–1 record, 2.57 ERA, and 34 strikeouts across 28 innings of work. In 2023, Takeda made 29 appearances for Fukuoka, registering a 1–2 record, 3.91 ERA, and 38 strikeouts across 46 innings pitched.

On April 9, 2024, Takeda underwent Tommy John surgery, prematurely ending his season. He did not appear for the main team during the 2025 campaign as well.

=== SSG Landers ===
On November 16, 2025, Takeda signed a one-year, $200,000 contract with the SSG Landers of the KBO League.

== International career ==
On October 9, Takeda was selected as the Japan national baseball team for 2015 WBSC Premier12.

February 2, 2017, Takeda was elected to the Japan national baseball team at the 2017 World Baseball Classic.
