= Shohei Tateyama =

Japanese baseball player and coach

Fukushima RedHopes – No. 25
- Starting pitcher / Coach
- Born: March 17, 1981 (age 45); Atsugi, Japan
- Batted: Right Threw: Right

NPB debut
- July 20, 2003, for the Yakult Swallows

Last NPB appearance
- September 21, 2019, for the Tokyo Yakult Swallows

NPB statistics (through 2018)
- Win–loss record: 85–67
- Earned run average: 3.31
- Strikeouts: 995
- Stats at Baseball Reference

Teams
- As player: Yakult Swallows/Tokyo Yakult Swallows (2003–2019); As coach: Tohoku Rakuten Golden Eagles (2020–2021); Fukushima RedHopes (2022-present)

Career highlights and awards
- Led Central League in winning percentage (2008); Led Central League in wins (2009); Led Central League in shutouts (2010 and 2011); Comeback Player of the Year (2015)

Shohei Tateyama (館山 昌平, Tateyama Shōhei; born March 3, 1981) is a former Japanese professional baseball pitcher and currently pitting coach for the Tohoku Rakuten Golden Eagles of the Nippon Professional Baseball (NPB). He played for the Tokyo Yakult Swallows of the NPB.

== Background ==
Tateyama began his professional career in 2003 with the Yakult Swallows and became a regular pitcher from the 2004 season and from 2008, a regular starter for the team. At this time his performances improved and he led the Central League in winning percentage with 0.800 (12-3). The next year, he led the league in victories, with 16, despite a 3.39 ERA, and in 2010 and 2011 he led the league in shutouts, becoming monthly MVP in August 2010. He was the monthly MVP again in April and September 2012.

On September 13, 2019, he held press conference with Kazuhiro Hatakeyama about his retirement. On October 14, 2019, Tateyama become second squad pitting coach for the Tohoku Rakuten Golden Eagles of NPB.
