= Kazuhiro Hatakeyama =

Japanese baseball player and coach (born 1982)

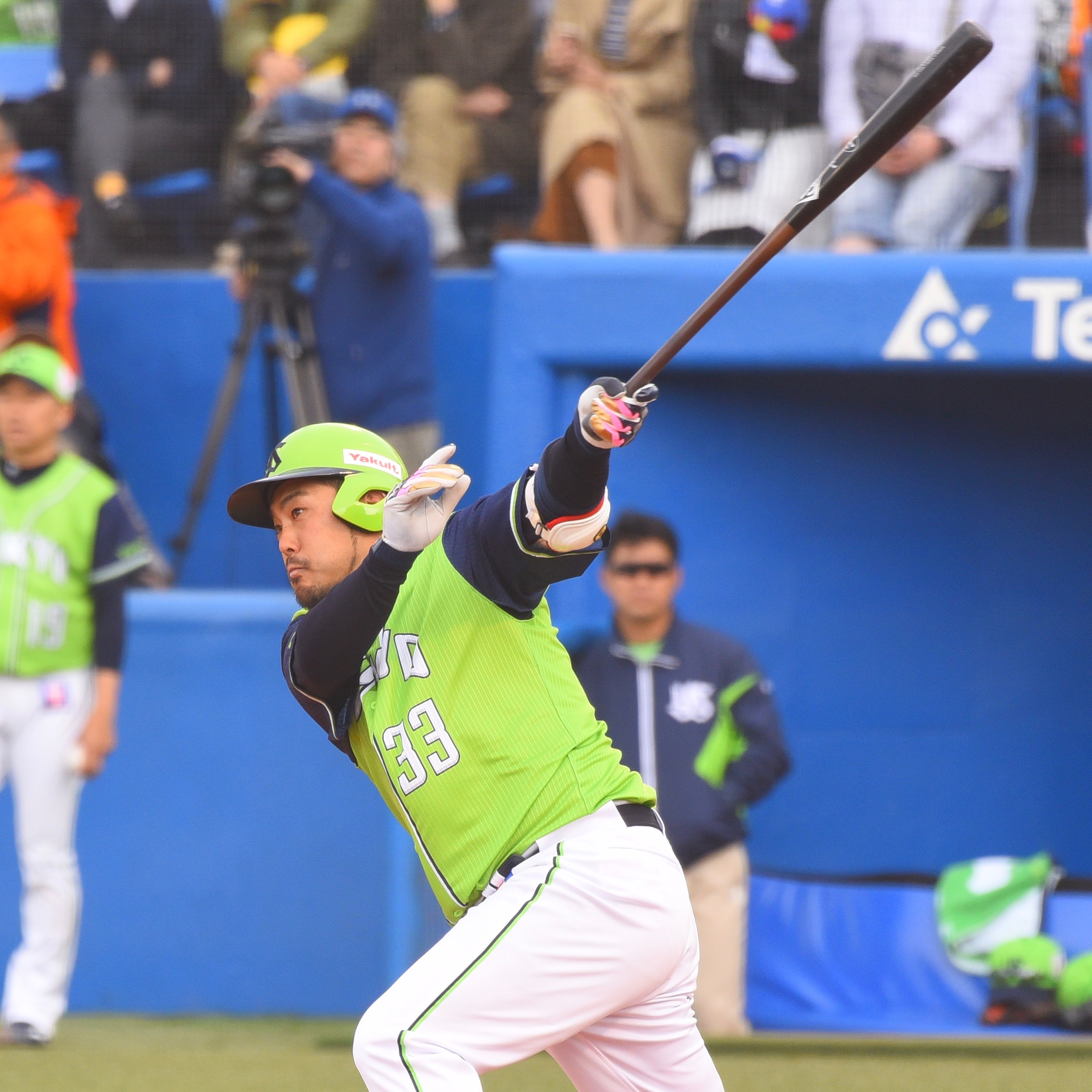
- infielder / Coach
- Born: September 13, 1982 (age 43); Hanamaki, Iwate, Japan
- Batted: Right Threw: Right

NPB debut
- August 6, 2004, for the Yakult Swallows

Last NPB appearance
- September 21, 2019, for the Tokyo Yakult Swallows

NPB statistics
- Batting average: .266
- Home runs: 128
- Runs batted in: 567

Teams
- As player: Yakult Swallows/Tokyo Yakult Swallows (2001–2019); As coach: Tokyo Yakult Swallows (2020–2024)

Career highlights and awards
- 2× Central League Golden Glove Award (2012, 2015); 2× NPB All-Star (2011-2012); 1× Central League RBI champions (2015); 1× Central League Best Nine Award (2015); 1× NPB All-Star Game MVP (2011 Game 1)

Kazuhiro Hatakeyama (畠山 和洋, Hatakeyama Kazuhiro; born September 13, 1982) is a Japanese former professional baseball infielder and current hitting coach for the Tokyo Yakult Swallows of Nippon Professional Baseball (NPB). He played in NPB for the Swallows from 2001 to 2019. Hatakeyama was the 2015 Central League leader in runs batted in, with 105. His retirement ceremony was conducted on September 21, 2019.

== Career ==
On September 13, 2019, Hatakeyama held a press conference with Shohei Tateyama confirming his retirement.
