= 2014 Japan Series =

65th edition of Nippon Professional Baseball's championship series

Team (Wins)	Managers	Season
Fukuoka SoftBank Hawks (4)	Koji Akiyama	78–60–6, (.565), GA: 6.5
Hanshin Tigers (1)	Yutaka Wada	75–68–1, (.524), GB: 7
- Dates: October 25–30
- MVP: Seiichi Uchikawa (Fukuoka)
- FSA: Randy Messenger (Hanshin)

The 2014 Japan Series (known as the SMBC Nippon Series 2014 for sponsorship reasons) was the 65th edition of Nippon Professional Baseball's (NPB) championship series known colloquially as the Japan Series. The best-of-seven playoff was won by the Pacific League champion Fukuoka SoftBank Hawks in five games over the Central League champion Hanshin Tigers. The series began on Saturday, October 25, 2014, and ended on Thursday, October 30, 2014, at the Fukuoka Dome in Fukuoka, Fukuoka Prefecture.

== Climax Series ==
First Stage
Central League
2	Hanshin Tigers	1
3	Hiroshima Toyo Carp	0
Pacific League
2	Orix Buffaloes	1
3	Hokkaido Nippon-Ham Fighters	2

Final Stage
1	Yomiuri Giants	1
2	Hanshin Tigers	4
1	Fukuoka SoftBank Hawks	4
3	Hokkaido Nippon-Ham Fighters	3

Japan Series
CL2	Hanshin Tigers	1
PL1	Fukuoka SoftBank Hawks	4

== Summary ==
Fukuoka SoftBank Hawks won the series, 4–1.

Game	Date	Score	Location	Time	Attendance
1	October 25	Fukuoka SoftBank Hawks – 2, Hanshin Tigers – 6	Koshien Stadium	3:26	45,293
2	October 26	Fukuoka SoftBank Hawks – 2, Hanshin Tigers – 1	Koshien Stadium	2:57	45,259
3	October 28	Hanshin Tigers – 1, Fukuoka SoftBank Hawks – 5	Fukuoka Dome	3:30	35,527
4	October 29	Hanshin Tigers – 2, Fukuoka SoftBank Hawks – 5 (10)	Fukuoka Dome	3:56	35,861
5	October 30	Hanshin Tigers – 0, Fukuoka SoftBank Hawks – 1	Fukuoka Dome	3:31	36,068

== Game summaries ==
=== Game 1 ===
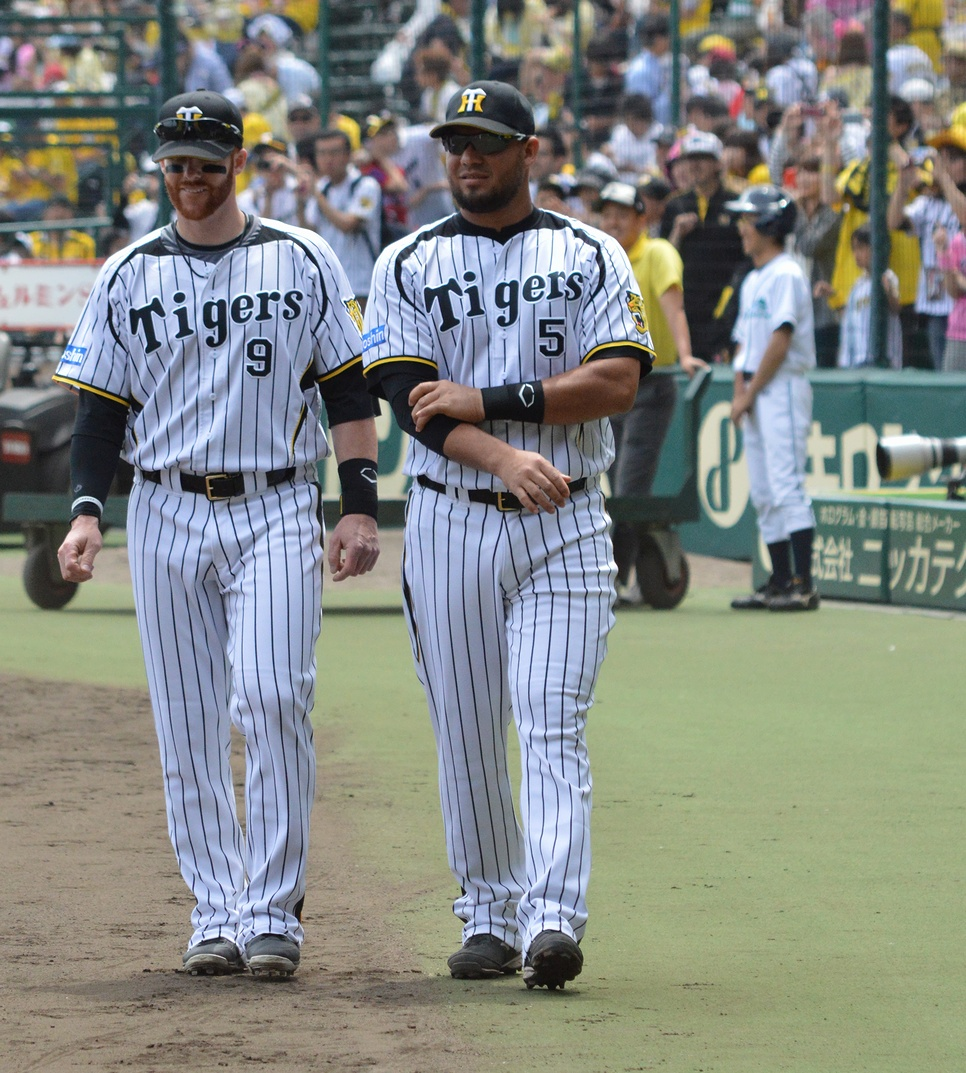
Matt Murton (left) and Mauro Gómez drove in two and three, respectively, of the Tigers' five runs in their Game 1 victory.

Saturday, October 25, 2014, 6:17 pm (JST) at Koshien Stadium in Nishinomiya, Hyōgo Prefecture
Team	1	2	3	4	5	6	7	8	9	R	H	E
SoftBank	0	0	0	0	0	1	1	0	0	2	6	0
Hanshin	0	0	0	1	5	0	0	0	X	6	9	1
WP: Randy Messenger (1–0) LP: Jason Standridge (0–1)

After three scoreless innings, the Hanshin Tigers took the lead in the bottom of the fourth inning. Hiroki Uemoto hit a single into center field then moved to second on a groundout by Takashi Toritani. Mauro Gómez then drove Uemoto in with an RBI double off of Fukuoka SoftBank Hawks' starting pitcher Jason Standridge. Standridge lasted until the fifth inning where he loaded the bases with two outs. Gómez, Matt Murton and Kosuke Fukudome then connected for three consecutive hits scoring the Tigers' remaining five runs.

Tigers' starting pitcher Randy Messenger pitched through the seventh inning and got the win. Messenger loaded the bases twice in the sixth inning but was able to hold them to only one run on a Lee Dae-ho sacrifice fly. He was touched up again in the seventh innings for one run on a Yuki Yanagita RBI single but the two runs weren't enough to overcome the Hawks' six-run deficit.

=== Game 2 ===
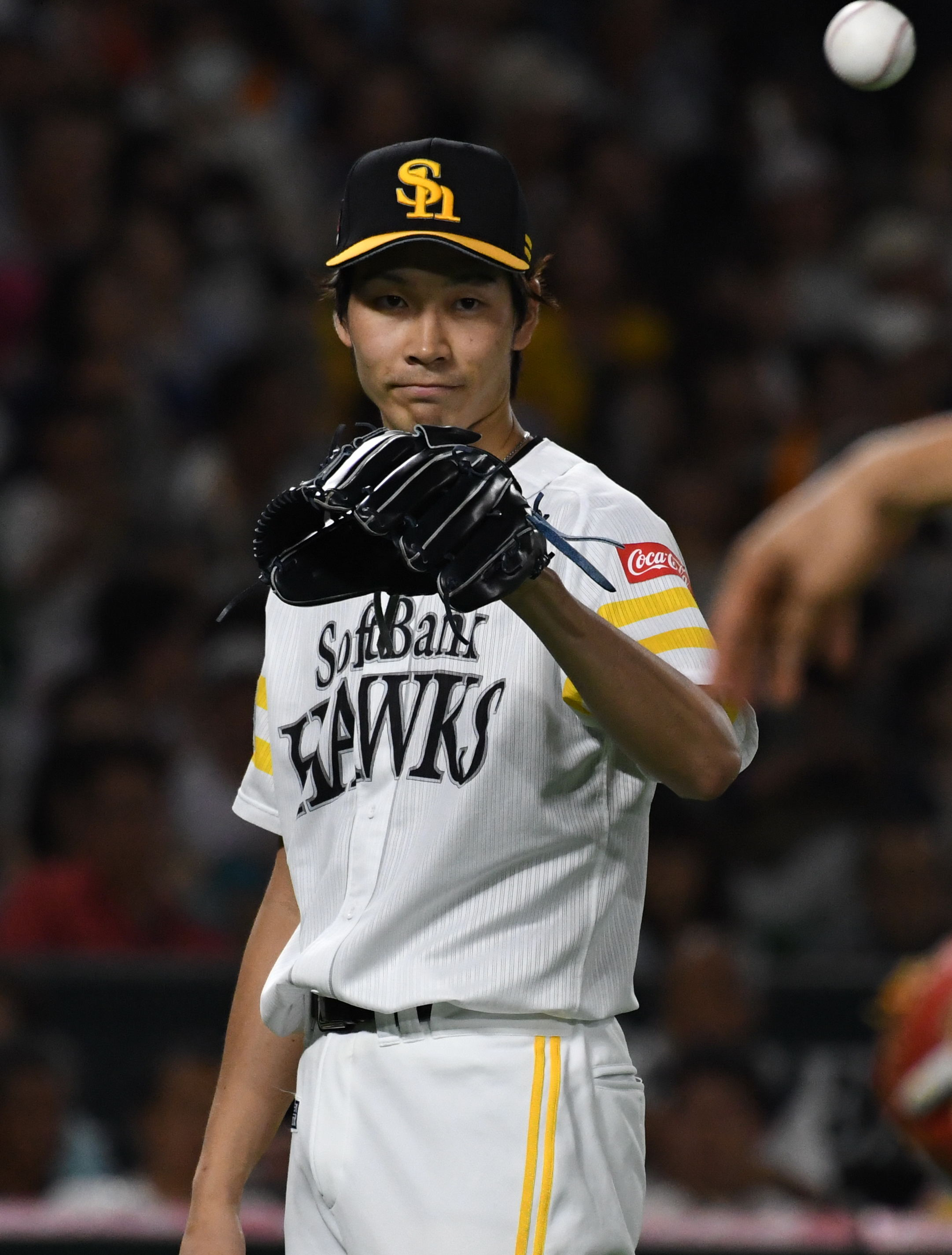
Hawks' starter Shota Takeda pitched seven innings of one-run ball to earn a win in Game 2.

Sunday, October 26, 2014, 6:18 pm (JST) at Koshien Stadium in Nishinomiya, Hyōgo Prefecture
Team	1	2	3	4	5	6	7	8	9	R	H	E
SoftBank	1	0	0	1	0	0	0	0	0	2	7	0
Hanshin	0	0	0	0	0	1	0	0	0	1	5	0
WP: Shota Takeda (1–0) LP: Atsushi Nomi (0–1) Sv: Dennis Sarfate (1); Home runs: SBH: Lee Dae-ho (1); HAN: None

In Game 2, Hawks' starter Shota Takeda earned a win by giving up only one run in seven innings pitched. Retiring the first 17 batters he faced, Takeda had a perfect game going into the sixth inning until he gave up a two-out single. Also in that inning, Tsuyoshi Nishioka's double drove in the Tigers only run of the game. Relief pitchers Ryota Igarashi and Dennis Sarfate followed up Takeda by pitching scoreless eighth and ninth innings, respectively.

The scoring began in the top of the first inning when the Hawks' Yuki Yanagita singled to center and reached second on a Kenta Imamiya sacrifice bunt. A double by Seiichi Uchikawa then drove in Yanagita giving the Hawks the lead before Takeda ever took the mound. The Hawks got an important insurance run in the fourth inning when Lee Dae-ho hit a home run to score what would prove to be the game-winning run.

=== Game 3 ===
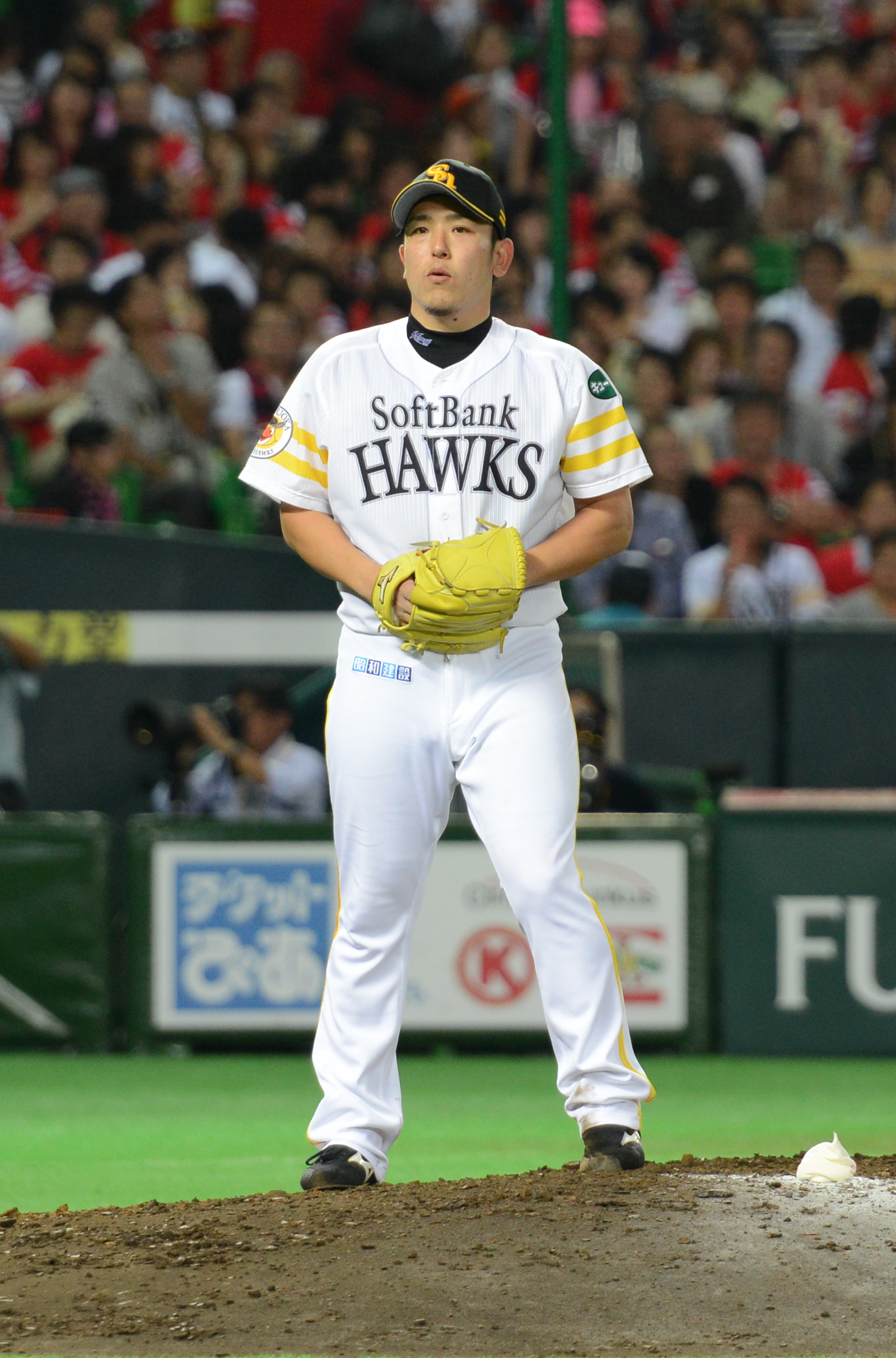
Kenji Otonari pitched seven shutout innings to earn a Game 3 win for the Hawks.

Tuesday, October 28, 2014, 6:32 pm (JST) at Fukuoka Yahuoku! Dome in Fukuoka, Fukuoka Prefecture
Team	1	2	3	4	5	6	7	8	9	R	H	E
Hanshin	0	0	0	0	0	0	0	0	1	1	5	0
SoftBank	1	0	0	1	0	3	0	0	X	5	10	0
WP: Kenji Otonari (1–0) LP: Shintaro Fujinami (0–1)

The Hawks took a two-games-to-one lead in the Series behind a dominant pitching performance by starter Kenji Otonari. Pitching seven shutout innings, Otonari gave up only three hits, while striking out six and walking one. For the second straight game the Hawks scored a run in the first inning. Just like in Game 2, Yanagita led off the first inning with a hit, was moved ahead by a sacrifice bunt, and then was driven in by a double from Uchikawa. Later, when Yuki Yoshimura drew a walk to start the bottom of the fourth inning, he was bunted to second and then scored from there on a wild pitch thrown by Shintaro Fujinami. The scoring continued in the sixth when Uchikawa collected another RBI along with two more from Lee. The only scoring for the Tigers occurred in the ninth inning when Toritani drove in a run on an RBI single off of reliever Sarfate.

=== Game 4 ===
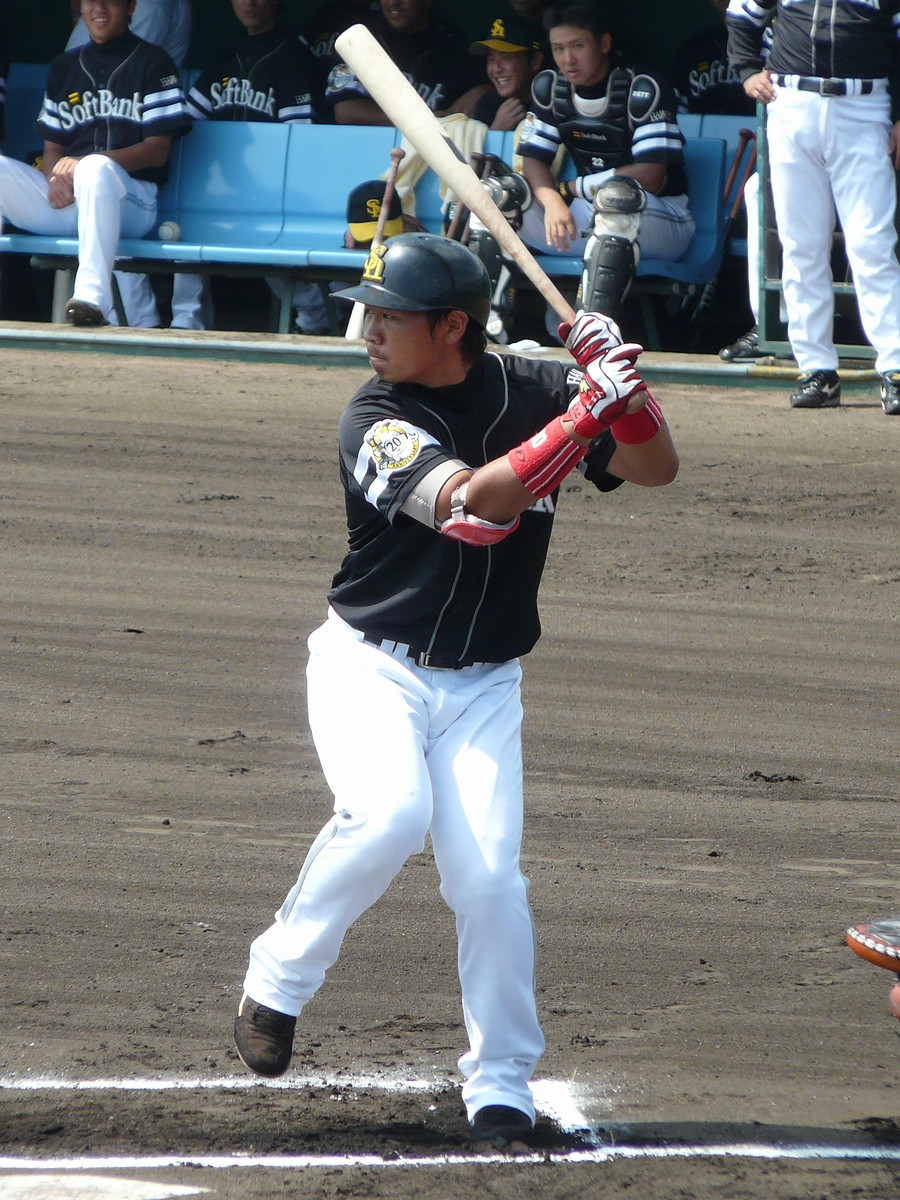
Akira Nakamura hit a three-run walk-off home run in the tenth inning to give the Hawks a Game 4 win.

Wednesday, October 29, 2014, 6:30 pm (JST) at Fukuoka Yahuoku! Dome in Fukuoka, Fukuoka Prefecture
Team	1	2	3	4	5	6	7	8	9	10	R	H	E
Hanshin	0	0	2	0	0	0	0	0	0	0	2	4	0
SoftBank	2	0	0	0	0	0	0	0	0	3X	5	7	0
WP: Dennis Sarfate (1–0) LP: Yuya Ando (0–1); Home runs: HAN: None; SBH: Akira Nakamura (1)

=== Game 5 ===
Thursday, October 30, 2014, 6:33 pm (JST) at Fukuoka Yahuoku! Dome in Fukuoka, Fukuoka Prefecture
Team	1	2	3	4	5	6	7	8	9	R	H	E
Hanshin	0	0	0	0	0	0	0	0	0	0	5	0
SoftBank	0	0	0	0	0	0	0	1	X	1	9	0
WP: Ryota Igarashi (1–0) LP: Randy Messenger (1–1) Sv: Dennis Sarfate (2)

The game remained scoreless until the 8th inning. With tiring Hanshin starter Randy Messenger still in the game, runners were on 1st and 3rd with two out and SoftBank 3rd baseman Nobuhiro Matsuda at the plate. With a full count and runners off with the pitch, Matsuda lined a single to center field on the 8th pitch of the at-bat, which scored Yuki Yanagita.

In the top of the 9th, SoftBank closer Sarfate loaded the bases with 1 out and Hanshin shortstop Tsuyoshi Nishioka at-bat. Nishioka hit a ground ball to first. The ball was cleanly fielded and thrown to SoftBank catcher Toru Hosokawa for the force out at home. Hosokawa then quickly threw back to first to try and complete the double play that would end the game. However, his throw went wide. The error allowed Hanshin to score the tying run, but the umpires convened after Hosokawa protested the play. Nishioka was called out on interference, which completed the double play and ended the game with a 1–0 score line.

== See also ==
- 2014 Korean Series
- 2014 World Series
